= 1970 Detroit Tigers season =

Major League Baseball season

1970 Detroit Tigers
- League: American League
- Division: East
- Ballpark: Tiger Stadium
- City: Detroit, Michigan
- Owners: John Fetzer
- General managers: Jim Campbell
- Managers: Mayo Smith
- Television: WJBK (George Kell, Larry Osterman)
- Radio: WJR (Ernie Harwell, Ray Lane)

The 1970 Detroit Tigers season was the team's 70th season and the 59th season at Tiger Stadium. The team finished fourth in the American League East with a record of 79–83, 29 games behind the Baltimore Orioles.

== Offseason ==
- December 13, 1969: Tom Matchick was traded by the Tigers to the Boston Red Sox for Dalton Jones.
- February 19, 1970: The Tigers' Cy Young Award winning pitcher, Denny McLain, was suspended from baseball "indefinitely" by MLB Commissioner Bowie Kuhn.
- April 1, 1970: Kuhn announced that McLain's suspension would last until July 1, 1970. McLain missed the first 71 games of the 162-game season.

== Regular season ==
=== Season standings ===
AL East
Team	W	L	Pct.	GB	Home	Road
Baltimore Orioles	108	54	.667	—	59‍–‍22	49‍–‍32
New York Yankees	93	69	.574	15	53‍–‍28	40‍–‍41
Boston Red Sox	87	75	.537	21	52‍–‍29	35‍–‍46
Detroit Tigers	79	83	.488	29	42‍–‍39	37‍–‍44
Cleveland Indians	76	86	.469	32	43‍–‍38	33‍–‍48
Washington Senators	70	92	.432	38	40‍–‍41	30‍–‍51

=== Record vs. opponents ===
1970 American League record Sources:
Team	BAL	BOS	CAL	CWS	CLE	DET	KC	MIL	MIN	NYY	OAK	WAS
Baltimore	—	13–5	7–5	9–3	14–4	11–7	12–0	7–5	5–7	11–7	7–5	12–6
Boston	5–13	—	5–7	8–4	12–6	9–9	7–5	5–7	7–5	10–8	7–5	12–6
California	5–7	7–5	—	12–6	6–6	6–6	10–8	12–6	8–10	5–7	8–10	7–5
Chicago	3–9	4–8	6–12	—	6–6	6–6	7–11	7–11	6–12	5–7	2–16	4–8
Cleveland	4–14	6–12	6–6	6–6	—	7–11	8–4	7–5	6–6	8–10	7–5	11–7
Detroit	7–11	9–9	6–6	6–6	11–7	—	6–6	8–4	4–8	7–11	6–6	9–9
Kansas City	0–12	5–7	8–10	11–7	4–8	6–6	—	12–6	5–13	1–11	7–11	6–6
Milwaukee	5–7	7–5	6–12	11–7	5–7	4–8	6–12	—	5–13	3–9–1	8–10	5–7
Minnesota	7–5	5–7	10–8	12–6	6–6	8–4	13–5	13–5	—	5–7	13–5	6–6
New York	7–11	8–10	7–5	7–5	10–8	11–7	11–1	9–3–1	7–5	—	6–6	10–8
Oakland	5–7	5–7	10–8	16–2	5–7	6–6	11–7	10–8	5–13	6–6	—	10–2
Washington	6–12	6–12	5–7	8–4	7–11	9–9	6–6	7–5	6–6	8–10	2–10	—

=== Notable transactions ===
- April 8, 1970: Tom Tresh was released by the Tigers.
- August 2, 1970: Kevin Collins was purchased by the Tigers from the Montreal Expos.

=== Roster ===
1970 Detroit Tigers
Roster
Pitchers: 38 Les Cain; 18 John Hiller; 35 Mike Kilkenny; 30 Lerrin LaGrow; 15 Fred Lasher; 29 Mickey Lolich; 17 Denny McLain; 36 Norm McRae; 19 Joe Niekro; 43 Daryl Patterson; 20 Bob Reed; 27 Jerry Robertson; 46 Dennis Saunders; 39 Fred Scherman; 28 Tom Timmermann; 16 Earl Wilson	Catchers: 11 Bill Freehan; 34 Tim Hosley; 33 Gene Lamont; 12 Jim Price; Infielders: 9 Ike Brown; 25 Norm Cash; 4 Kevin Collins; 7 César Gutiérrez; 2 Dalton Jones; 41 Elliott Maddox; 3 Dick McAuliffe; 42 Ken Szotkiewicz; 8 Don Wert	Outfielders: 26 Gates Brown; 23 Willie Horton; 6 Al Kaline; 31 Russ Nagelson; 5 Jim Northrup; 24 Mickey Stanley	Manager: 10 Mayo Smith; Coaches: 51 Wally Moses (First base/Hitting); 52 Len Okrie (Bullpen); 50 Grover Resinger (Third base); 53 Mike Roarke (Pitching)

== Player stats ==
=== Batting ===
= Indicates team leader

==== Starters by position ====
Note: G = Games played; AB = At bats; H = Hits; Avg. = Batting average; HR = Home runs; RBI = Runs batted in

Pos	Player	G	AB	H	Avg.	HR	RBI
C	Bill Freehan	117	395	95	.241	16	52
1B	Norm Cash	130	370	96	.259	15	53
2B	Dick McAuliffe	146	530	124	.234	12	50
SS	César Gutiérrez	135	415	101	.243	0	22
3B	Don Wert	128	363	79	.218	6	33
LF	Willie Horton	96	371	113	.305	17	69
CF	Mickey Stanley	142	568	143	.252	13	47
RF	Al Kaline	131	467	130	.278	16	71

==== Other batters ====
Note: G = Games played; AB = At bats; H = Hits; Avg. = Batting average; HR = Home runs; RBI = Runs batted in

Player	G	AB	H	Avg.	HR	RBI
Jim Northrup	139	504	132	.262	24	80
Elliott Maddox	109	258	64	.248	3	24
Dalton Jones	89	191	42	.220	6	21
Jim Price	52	132	24	.182	5	15
Gates Brown	81	124	28	.226	3	24
Ike Brown	56	94	27	.287	4	15
Ken Szotkiewicz	47	84	9	.107	3	9
Gene Lamont	15	44	13	.295	1	4
Russ Nagelson	28	32	6	.188	0	2
Kevin Collins	25	24	5	.208	1	3
Tim Hosley	7	12	2	.167	1	2

=== Pitching ===
= Indicates league leader

==== Starting pitchers ====
Note: G = Games pitched; IP = Innings pitched; W = Wins; L = Losses; ERA = Earned run average; SO = Strikeouts

Player	G	IP	W	L	ERA	SO
Mickey Lolich	40	272.2	14	19	3.80	230
Joe Niekro	38	213.0	12	13	4.06	101
Les Cain	29	180.2	12	7	3.84	156
Earl Wilson	18	96.0	4	6	4.41	74
Denny McLain	14	91.1	3	5	4.63	52

==== Other pitchers ====
Note: G = Games pitched; IP = Innings pitched; W = Wins; L = Losses; ERA = Earned run average; SO = Strikeouts

Player	G	IP	W	L	ERA	SO
Mike Kilkenny	36	129.0	7	6	5.16	105
Bob Reed	16	46.1	2	4	4.86	26

==== Relief pitchers ====
Note: G = Games pitched; W = Wins; L = Losses; SV = Saves; ERA = Earned run average; SO = Strikeouts

Player	G	W	L	SV	ERA	SO
Tom Timmermann	61	6	7	27	4.11	49
Fred Scherman	48	4	4	1	3.23	58
John Hiller	47	6	6	3	3.03	89
Daryl Patterson	43	7	1	2	4.85	55
Norm McRae	19	0	0	0	2.87	16
Fred Lasher	12	1	3	3	5.00	8
Jerry Robertson	11	0	0	0	3.68	11
Lerrin LaGrow	10	0	1	0	7.30	7
Dennis Saunders	8	1	1	1	3.21	8

== Farm system ==
Level	Team	League	Manager
AAA	Toledo Mud Hens	International League	Frank Carswell
AA	Montgomery Rebels	Southern League	Stubby Overmire
A	Rocky Mount Leafs	Carolina League	Max Lanier
A	Lakeland Tigers	Florida State League	Dick Tracewski
A-Short Season	Batavia Trojans	New York–Penn League	Joe Lewis
Rookie	Bristol Tigers	Appalachian League	Al Lakeman
