= 1968 Detroit Tigers season =

Major League Baseball season

1968 Detroit Tigers
- World Series champions American League champions
- League: American League
- Ballpark: Tiger Stadium
- City: Detroit, Michigan
- Record: 103–59 (.636)
- League place: 1st
- Owners: John Fetzer
- General managers: Jim Campbell
- Managers: Mayo Smith
- Television: WJBK (George Kell, Larry Osterman)
- Radio: WJR (Ernie Harwell, Ray Lane)

The 1968 Detroit Tigers season was the team's 68th season and the 57th season at Tiger Stadium. The Tigers won the 1968 World Series, defeating the St. Louis Cardinals four games to three. The 1968 baseball season, known as the "Year of the Pitcher," was the Detroit Tigers' 68th since they entered the American League in 1901, their eighth pennant, and third World Series championship. Detroit pitcher Denny McLain won the Cy Young Award and was named the American League's Most Valuable Player after winning 31 games. Mickey Lolich pitched three complete games in the World Series – and won all three – to win World Series MVP honors.

== Players ==
=== Pitching: McLain, Lolich, Wilson and Sparma ===
Denny McLain had a remarkable season in 1968, as he went 31–6 with a 1.96 earned run average (ERA), was an All-Star, won the Cy Young Award, won the AL Most Valuable Player Award, and won Game 6 of the World Series. He is the only pitcher since 1934 to win 30 games in a season. Beleaguered by legal and financial troubles in later years, McLain was at his best in 1968. Perhaps worn down by pitching 336 innings during the regular season, McLain's 1968 World Series performance was not as stellar. He lost Games 1 and 4 to NL Cy Young Award winner, Bob Gibson. McLain did, however, win the crucial Game 6 on just two days rest, holding the Cardinals to one run in a 13–1 victory.

The Tigers No. 2 starter, Mickey Lolich, allowed just five World Series runs in three complete games, winning all three including the final and decisive game. Lolich also helped himself at the plate in Game 2 when he hit the only home run of his 16-year career. Lolich was given the World Series MVP Award for his performance. During the regular season, Lolich went 17–9 with 197 strikeouts and a 3.19 ERA. He was actually moved to bullpen briefly in August after a few poor starts, but returned to pitch well down the stretch.

Earl Wilson was the team's No. 3 pitcher, going 13–12 for the season with a 2.85 ERA. Known as one of the best power hitters of all time among major league pitchers, Wilson hit seven home runs in 88 at-bats in 1968. Wilson's at bat-to-home run ratio of 12.57 was higher than any player in the major leagues in 1968 — higher even than home run leaders Frank Howard and Willie Horton. Wilson was the losing pitcher in Game 3 of the World Series, allowing 10 baserunners and three earned runs in 4 1/3 innings pitched.

The Tigers No. 4 starter, Joe Sparma, was the starting quarterback of the undefeated 1961 Ohio State football team. In 1968, Sparma lost his spot in the rotation after a run-in with manager Mayo Smith. Sparma was pulled from a game and made critical comments about Smith to sportswriter Joe Falls. When Falls asked Smith for a response, Smith said he "didn't want to get into a spitting contest with a skunk." Smith refused to start Sparma for several weeks afterward. When Sparma finally got another start on September 17, 1968, he pitched a one-run complete game against the Yankees to clinch the pennant. The Sparma–Smith feud continued, and Sparma pitched only 1/3 of an inning in the 1968 World Series, giving up two earned runs for a 54.00 ERA in postseason play.

The Tigers bullpen in 1968 included Daryl Patterson, Fred Lasher, John Hiller (who also made 12 starts during the season) and Pat Dobson (who made 10 starts during the season).

=== Catcher: Bill Freehan ===
Catcher Bill Freehan posted career highs with 25 home runs (fifth in the AL) and 84 runs batted in (RBIs) (sixth in the AL) and broke his own records with 971 putouts and 1,050 total chances, marks which remained AL records until Dan Wilson topped them with the 1997 Seattle Mariners. Freehan was hit by a pitch 24 times in 1968 – at that time an AL record. Freehan was the starting catcher for the AL All Star team in 1968 (and every other year from 1966 to 1972) and finished second in the 1968 American League MVP voting, behind McLain.

=== Infield: Cash, McAuliffe, Oyler and Wert ===
First baseman Norm Cash, known as "Stormin' Norman", was one of the most popular players on the team. In 1968, he hit .268 with 25 home runs despite being limited to 127 games. In the 1968 World Series, Cash hit .385 (10-for-26). Cash singled to start a three-run rally in the seventh inning of Game 7. The rally broke a scoreless tie in a pitching duel between Lolich and Gibson.

Second baseman Dick McAuliffe had a .344 on-base percentage, led the AL with 95 runs scored, and showed power with 50 extra base hits, including 16 home runs. He also tied a Major League record by going the entire 1968 season without grounding into a double play. A converted shortstop, McAuliffe also improved defensively, reducing his error total from 28 in 1967 to nine in 1968. He finished No. 7 in the 1968 AL MVP voting. On August 22, 1968, McAuliffe was involved in a brawl in which he drove his knee into pitcher Tommy John's shoulder after almost being hit in the head by a pitch. McAuliffe played well in the 1968 World Series, with five runs, six hits, four walks, three RBIs, and a home run in Game 3, a colossal solo shot into the top of the upper deck in right at Tiger Stadium.

Shortstop Ray Oyler managed only 29 hits (21 of them singles) in 1968 for a career-low batting average of .135. However, his glove remained valuable as he had a .977 fielding percentage – 15 points above the league average for shortstops. Late in the season, and in the World Series, Oyler was replaced at shortstop by outfielder Mickey Stanley in a historic gamble by manager Mayo Smith. In the offseason, Oyler was drafted by the expansion Seattle Pilots.

Third baseman Don Wert was hit in the head by a pitch that shattered his batting helmet on June 26, 1968. He was carried off on a stretcher, spent two nights in the hospital, missed several games, and was never the same hitter again. He had never hit lower than .257 in five prior seasons, but his 1968 batting average dropped to a career-low .200. Wert was selected for the AL All Star team in 1968 and is remembered for his ninth inning, game-winning hit on September 17 to clinch the American League pennant. Ernie Harwell described the scene as follows in his radio broadcast of the game:

- This big crowd here ready to break loose. Three men on, two men out. Game tied, 1–1, in the ninth inning. McDaniel checkin' his sign with Jake Gibbs. The tall right-hander ready to go to work again, and the windup, and the pitch...He swings, a line shot, base hit, right field, the Tigers win it! Here comes Kaline to score and it's all over! Don Wert singles, the Tigers mob Don, Kaline has scored...The fans are streaming on the field...And the Tigers have won their first pennant since nineteen hundred and forty-five! Let's listen to the bedlam here at Tiger Stadium!

=== Outfield: Kaline, Northrup, Horton and Stanley ===
Left fielder Willie Horton led the way among the outfielders in 1968. His 36 home runs, 278 total bases and .543 slugging percentage all ranked second in the American League behind Frank Howard. In a year in which the league batting average was .230, Horton's .285 average was good for fourth in the AL, and he also finished fourth in the AL MVP voting. In the World Series, Horton batted .304 and had a solo home run to give the Tigers an early lead in Game 2. He also made a pivotal defensive play in the fifth inning of Game 5. When Lou Brock tried to score from second base on a single to left field, Brock was tagged out on a throw from Horton that hit Freehan's glove on the fly. Horton was the only African American position player to start for the team.

Mickey Stanley covered center field for the 1968 Tigers, won a Gold Glove Award at the position and led all American League outfielders with a perfect 1.000 fielding percentage. Prior to 1968, Stanley had been used mostly as a backup outfielder, but an injury to Al Kaline expanded his playing time, as Jim Northrup moved to right field to sub for Kaline. When shortstop Ray Oyler went "0 for August", and his batting average fell to .135, manager Mayo Smith made one of the most talked-about managerial moves in baseball history, moving Stanley to shortstop for the last 9 games of the regular season and for all 7 games of the 1968 World Series. The move also allowed Smith to play both Kaline and Northrup in the outfield. Stanley had not played the shortstop position before the 1968 season, but was a talented athlete with a good glove. Though Stanley made 2 errors in the World Series, neither error led to a run being scored. In its "The End of the Century" series, ESPN rated Mayo Smith's decision to move Stanley to shortstop for the World Series as one of the 10 greatest coaching decisions of the 20th Century in any sport.

Jim Northrup was the Tigers' right fielder for most of the 1968 season, and was among the American League leaders with 90 RBIs (3rd in the AL), 57 extra base hits (4th in the AL), 259 total bases (5th in the AL), and 29 doubles (5th in the AL). Northrup also hit four grand slams during the 1968 regular season, plus one more in the World Series. He hit two in consecutive at bats on June 24, 1968, and then hit another five days later, becoming the first major league player to hit three grand slams in a single week. Northrup's fifth grand slam came in Game 6 of the World Series. With Stanley moving to shortstop, Northrup started in center field during the World Series. Northrup also had the Series-clinching hit in Game 7 off Cardinals ace Bob Gibson. After Gibson held the Tigers scoreless through the first six innings, Northrup hit a triple over center fielder Curt Flood's head, driving in Norm Cash and Willie Horton. In the 7-game series, Northrup had a .536 slugging percentage, with 8 RBIs, 7 hits, 4 runs scored, and 2 home runs. Northrup placed 13th in the 1968 AL MVP voting.

The only future Hall of Fame member who played regularly for the 1968 Tigers was Al Kaline. (Hall of Famer Eddie Mathews played in 31 games for the 1968 Tigers.) However, Kaline broke his arm after being hit by a pitch in May and missed part of the season. He played 70 games at his usual spot in right field and another 22 games at first base. His .287 batting average would have placed him 4th in the league, but he did not have enough at bats to qualify. Kaline excelled in his only World Series appearance by batting .379 with 2 home runs and 8 RBIs.

=== The Pinch-hitter: Gates Brown ===
Pinch-hitter Gates Brown also had a huge year for the Tigers in 1968. Signed by the Tigers while serving time in an Ohio prison, Brown led the team with a .370 batting average (34-for-92) and .685 slugging percentage in the "year of the pitcher" when the league batting average was only .230. He also led the American League in pinch hits and came off the bench with clutch hits to spark a number of dramatic ninth inning come-back victories. In a doubleheader against the Boston Red Sox on August 11, 1968, Brown had a clutch game-winning home run off Lee Stange in the 14th inning of the first game, then had a game-winning single off Sparky Lyle in the ninth inning of the second game.

== Offseason ==
- October 20, 1967: Jerry Lumpe was released by the Tigers.
- November 28, 1967: Dave Wickersham was traded by the Tigers to the Pittsburgh Pirates for Dennis Ribant.
- January 27, 1968: 1968 Major League Baseball draft secondary phase
  - Ken Szotkiewicz was drafted by the Tigers in the 1st round (3rd pick).
  - Chuck Scrivener was drafted by the Tigers in the 2nd round.

== Regular season ==
=== Season standings ===
American League
Team	W	L	Pct.	GB	Home	Road
Detroit Tigers	103	59	.636	—	56‍–‍25	47‍–‍34
Baltimore Orioles	91	71	.562	12	47‍–‍33	44‍–‍38
Cleveland Indians	86	75	.534	16½	43‍–‍37	43‍–‍38
Boston Red Sox	86	76	.531	17	46‍–‍35	40‍–‍41
New York Yankees	83	79	.512	20	39‍–‍42	44‍–‍37
Oakland Athletics	82	80	.506	21	44‍–‍38	38‍–‍42
Minnesota Twins	79	83	.488	24	41‍–‍40	38‍–‍43
California Angels	67	95	.414	36	32‍–‍49	35‍–‍46
Chicago White Sox	67	95	.414	36	36‍–‍45	31‍–‍50
Washington Senators	65	96	.404	37½	34‍–‍47	31‍–‍49

=== Record vs. opponents ===
1968 American League record Sources:
Team	BAL	BOS	CAL	CWS	CLE	DET	MIN	NYY	OAK	WAS
Baltimore	—	9–9	10–8	11–7	7–11	8–10	10–8	13–5	9–9	14–4
Boston	9–9	—	9–9	14–4	10–8	6–12	9–9	10–8	8–10	11–7
California	8–10	9–9	—	8–10	7–11	5–13	7–11	6–12	5–13	12–6
Chicago	7–11	4–14	10–8	—	5–13	5–13	10–8	6–12	10–8	10–8
Cleveland	11–7	8–10	11–7	13–5	—	6–12	14–4	10–8–1	6–12	7–10
Detroit	10–8	12–6	13–5	13–5	12–6	—	10–8	10–8–1	13–5–1	10–8
Minnesota	8–10	9–9	11–7	8–10	4–14	8–10	—	12–6	8–10	11–7
New York	5–13	8–10	12–6	12–6	8–10–1	8–10–1	6–12	—	10–8	14–4
Oakland	9–9	10–8	13–5	8–10	12–6	5–13–1	10–8	8–10	—	7–11
Washington	4–14	7–11	6–12	8–10	10–7	8–10	7–11	4–14	11–7	—

=== Roster ===
1968 Detroit Tigers
Roster
Pitchers: 38 Les Cain; 22 Pat Dobson; 30 Roy Face; 18 John Hiller; 15 Fred Lasher; 29 Mickey Lolich; 17 Denny McLain; 47 Don McMahon; 43 Daryl Patterson; 14 Dennis Ribant; 34 Jim Rooker; 21 Joe Sparma; 39 Jon Warden; 16 Earl Wilson; 37 John Wyatt	Catchers: 11 Bill Freehan; 12 Jim Price; Infielders: 33 Dave Campbell; 25 Norm Cash; 46 Bob Christian; 2 Tom Matchick; 7 Eddie Mathews; 3 Dick McAuliffe; 1 Ray Oyler; 44 Dick Tracewski; 8 Don Wert	Outfielders: 26 Gates Brown; 27 Wayne Comer; 30 Lenny Green; 23 Willie Horton; 6 Al Kaline; 5 Jim Northrup; 24 Mickey Stanley	Manager: 10 Mayo Smith; Coaches: 50 Tony Cuccinello (third base); 51 Wally Moses (hitting/first base); 52 Hal Naragon (bullpen); 53 Johnny Sain (pitching)

=== Summary ===
After losing the 1967 American League pennant by one game to the Red Sox, the Tigers got off to a 9–1 start in 1968. By April 29, they were 12–4. On May 10, the Tigers moved into first place and remained there for the rest of the season. In baseball's final season before the leagues each split into two divisions, the Tigers finished with a record of 103–59 and outscored their opponents 671 to 492. The Orioles stayed close through much of the season, but the Tigers wound up winning the pennant with a 12-game lead over Baltimore. The 1968 Tigers also won the season series against all nine league opponents‚ the first team to accomplish that since the 1955 Dodgers. The 1968 Tigers developed a reputation for dramatic comebacks, often with winning late-inning home runs. The Tigers led the major leagues with 185 home runs in 1968, which was 52 more than the next closest team (Baltimore with 133). They won 40 games from the 7th inning forward, and won 30 games in their last at bat. In each game, there seemed to be a new hero, with even the light-hitting Don Wert, Ray Oyler and Tom Matchick providing clutch hits to win ballgames. The 1968 Tigers were also known for their esprit de corps. The starting lineup had been intact since 1965, and several of those starters had grown up in Michigan as Detroit Tigers fans: Willie Horton in Detroit's inner city, Bill Freehan in suburban Royal Oak, Jim Northrup in a small town 25 miles (40 km) west of Saginaw, and Mickey Stanley from the west of the state in Grand Rapids.

The 1968 Tigers' winning percentage ranks as the fifth-best in team history, as follows:

Best Seasons in Detroit Tigers History
Rank	Year	Wins	Losses	Win %	Finish
1	1934	101	53	.656	Lost 1934 World Series to Cardinals
2	1915	100	54	.649	2nd in AL behind Red Sox
3	1909	98	54	.645	Lost 1909 World Series to Pirates
4	1984	104	58	.642	Won 1984 World Series over Padres
5	1968	103	59	.636	Won 1968 World Series over Cardinals

=== Chronology ===
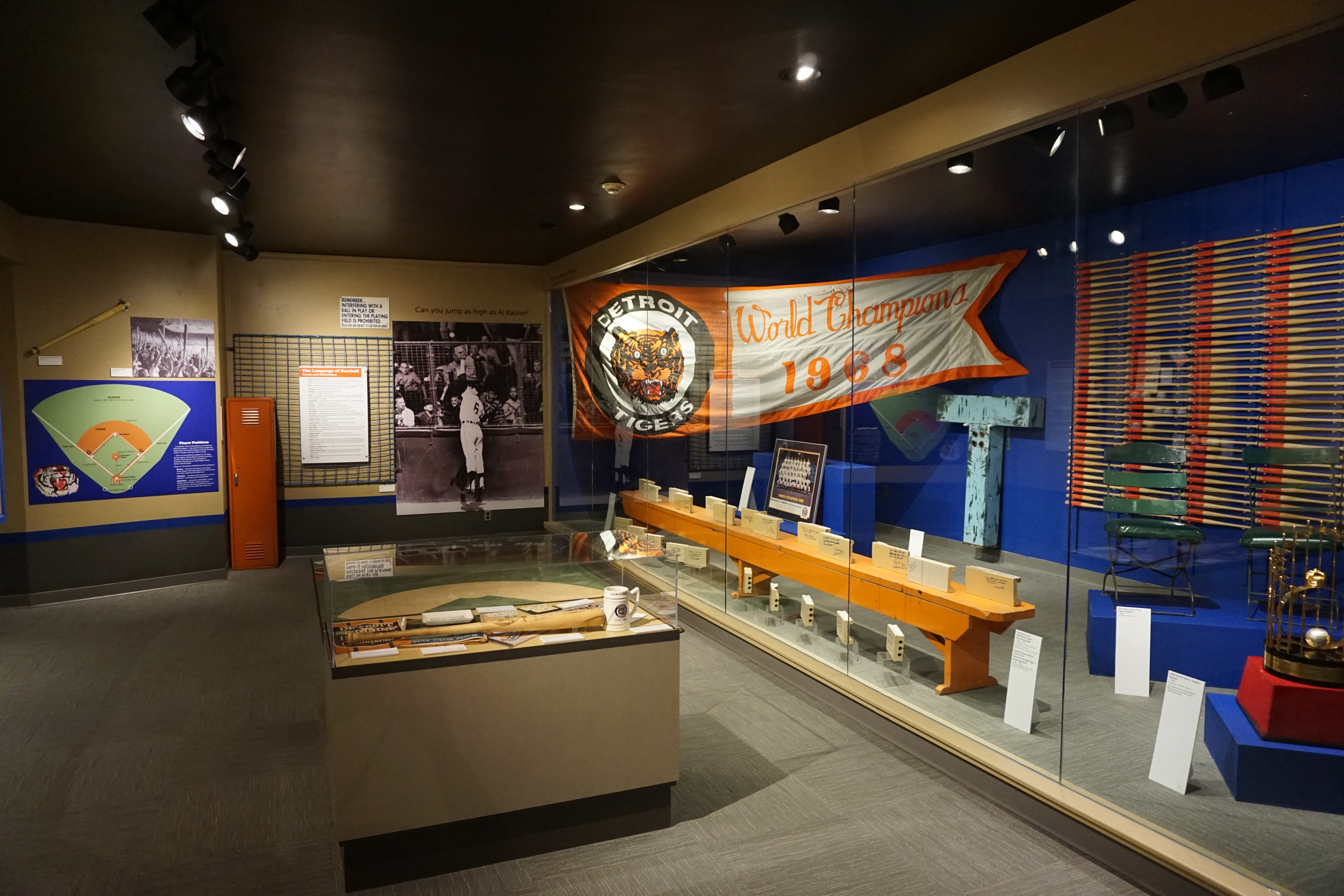
The Year of the Tiger: 1968 exhibit at the Detroit Historical Museum

- April 9: Opening Day in Major League Baseball was postponed for the funeral of Martin Luther King Jr.
- April 10: The Tigers lost to the Red Sox on Opening Day in Detroit. Detroit pitcher Earl Wilson hit a home run but allowed 5 earned runs in 5 innings.
- April 11: The Tigers got their first win, 4–3, over the Red Sox, as Dick McAuliffe, Bill Freehan and Gates Brown hit home runs.
- April 21: Denny McLain won his first game, 2–1, in the second game of a double-header. After losing on Opening Day, the Tigers had won 9 straight games.
- April 27: The Tigers shut out the Yankees, 7–0, behind a 5-hitter by Denny McLain. Dick McAuliffe and Jim Northrup hit home runs off Jim Bouton.
- April 29: Mickey Lolich got his first win of the season, 2–1, over the A's. Don Wert went 3-for-4, and the Tigers were 12–4 in their first 16 games.
- May 6: The Tigers lost to the Orioles, 4–0. Baltimore's Dave Leonhard threw a one-hitter, and the Tigers had 32 plate appearances in the game (seven batters safely reached base via a walk and two batters were awarded first base upon being hit by pitch), but only 23 at-bats, as the Orioles turned 3 double plays, and Mickey Stanley, Jim Northrup, and Al Kaline were all caught stealing.
- May 10: The Tigers won their 3rd straight game, 12–1, over the Senators, to move past the Orioles into first place. Detroit would remain in first place for the rest of the season. Denny McLain got the win, and Al Kaline, Don Wert and Bill Freehan hit home runs.
- May 17: Detroit led 2–1 going into the 9th inning. Frank Howard hit a 2-run home run in the top of the 9th to put the Senators in the lead, but Jim Northrup hit a walk-off grand slam in the bottom of the 9th. The Tigers won, 7–3.
- May 19: Detroit rookie Les Cain threw 6 2/3 scoreless innings for his first major league win. The Tigers beat the Senators, 7–0, as Eddie Mathews, Al Kaline, and Dick McAuliffe hit home runs. Kaline's home run was his 307th as a Tiger, making him the all-time leader in home runs by a Detroit Tiger.
- May 25: The Tigers beat the A's 2–1 behind Denny McLain, but Al Kaline's arm was broken when he was hit by a pitch. Kaline was out of action until June 30.
- May 26: A's pitcher Jack Aker beaned Jim Northrup on the batting helmet, and a 15-minute fight erupted. The A's won‚ 7–6.
- May 31: Mickey Lolich shut out the Yankees on a 1-hitter in front of 31,115 fans on a Friday night in Detroit. Willie Horton hit a home run in the 7th inning for the game's only run.
- June 5: Denny McLain won his 9th game in Boston.
- June 14: The Tigers beat the White Sox, 6–5, in 14 innings. Pitcher Earl Wilson hit a home run in the 2nd inning, and shortstop Don Wert won it with a home run in the 14th inning.
- June 15: Chicago's Tommy John hit 4 Detroit batters: Willie Horton (twice), Don Wert and Ray Oyler. The Tigers lost, 7–4. (See also August 22)
- June 24: Jim Northrup hit grand slams in consecutive at bats in the 5th and 6th innings. Shortstop Don Wert was hit in the head by a pitch that shattered his batting helmet. Wert was carried off the field on a stretcher and spent two nights in the hospital. The Tigers beat the Indians, 14–3.
- June 29: Jim Northrup hit his third grand slam of the week in a 5–2 victory over Chicago. Denny McLain notched his 14th win. The Tigers were 22 games over .500 at 48–26.
- July 4: There were fireworks on the July 4, as the Tigers and Angels combined for 8 home runs. The Tigers won, 13–10.
- July 5: Detroit beat Oakland, 8–5. Bill Freehan hit 2 home runs and tallied 6 RBIs.
- July 7: Denny McLain beat the A's, 7–6. Al Kaline hit a 3-run home run to help the Tigers sweep the A's in the second game of a double-header. At the All Star break, McLain was 16–2, and the Tigers led the AL by 9 1/2 games.
- July 19: With two outs in the bottom of the ninth and Bill Freehan on first base, reserve infielder Tom Matchick hit a walk-off home run to right field to give the Tigers a 5–4 win over Baltimore. It was one of only four home runs that Matchick hit in his entire career.
- July 26: Detroit beat Baltimore, 4–1, but Earl Wilson left the game after 5 innings with a strained knee. Daryl Patterson came into the game with the bases loaded and nobody out, and struck out the side.
- July 26, 1968: Dennis Ribant was traded by the Tigers to the Chicago White Sox for Don McMahon.
- July 27: Denny McLain pitched a 3-hit shutout over the Orioles for his 20th win. Norm Cash had 4 hits, and Willie Horton hit 2 home runs. The Tigers won, 9–0.
- August 8: Detroit scored 13 runs to beat the Indians, 14–1. Bill Freehan hit 2 home runs, walked twice, and drove in 4 runs. McLain won his 23rd.
- August 11: Gates Brown got clutch hits to win both games of a double-header against the Red Sox. Gates had a pinch-hit home run in the 14th inning of the opener for a 5–4 win. In the second game, he had a single to drive home the winning run, as the Tigers scored 4 runs in the 9th inning.
- August 12: The Tigers beat the Indians, 6–3, and the team was now 75–42.
- August 16: Denny McLain beat the Red Sox at Fenway Park for his 25th win. He was now 16–0 on the road. Bill Freehan was hit by pitches in 3 consecutive at bats.
- August 22: After hitting 4 Tigers in a game earlier in the year, Chicago pitcher Tommy John narrowly missed Dick McAuliffe's head. After another brushback pitch, words are exchanged, and McAuliffe charged the mound. McAuliffe kneed John in the shoulder, resulting in a season-ending injury to John. McAuliffe was suspended for five games.
- August 23: The Tigers lost to the Yankees, 2–1, in the first game of a double-header. In the second game, the score was tied 3–3 after 19 innings. Lindy McDaniel retired 21 straight Tiger batters‚ six on strikeouts.
- August 25: After taking a 5–0 lead, the Tigers lost to the Yankees‚ 6–5. The surprise winning pitcher for the Yankees was outfielder Rocky Colavito. The former Tiger slugger pitched 2 2/3 innings in relief and retired Al Kaline and Willie Horton. Adding to the insult, Colavito scored the winning run in the 8th inning.
- August 26: The Tigers beat the White Sox 3–0. Earl Wilson was hit by a pitch in the 2nd inning with the bases loaded to drive in the first run. One of nine White Sox home games played at Milwaukee County Stadium that season, it coincided with the first night of the Democratic National Convention.
- August 27: The Tiger lost to the White Sox, 2–1, as the series moved back to Comiskey Park.
- August 28: Back in Detroit, Denny McLain won his 26th game.
- August 30: In the first game of a 3-game series with second place Baltimore, the Tigers won 9–1 in front of 53,575 fans at Tiger Stadium. In one of the best performances of the year by any Tiger player, Earl Wilson pitched a 4-hitter, went 2-for-4 at the plate, hit his 5th home run of the year, and collected 4 RBIs.
- September 1: Almost 42,000 fans were on hand at Tiger Stadium as Denny McLain won his 27th game, beating the Orioles 7–3. The Tigers had a triple play in the 3rd inning, McLain to Tom Matchick to Norm Cash. Jim Northrup was 3-for-5 with 3 RBIs.
- September 6: The Tigers beat the Twins, 8–3, and Denny McLain got win number 28. Rookie Graig Nettles hit his first major league home run off McLain. Willie Horton hit his 32nd home run and had 5 RBIs.
- September 14: In front of 33,688 fans on a Saturday in Detroit, with Denny McLain seeking his 30th win, Reggie Jackson hit a home run in the 4th inning to put the A's on top. Norm Cash responded with a 3-run home run in the 4th. Reggie Jackson hit his second home run of the day in the 6th inning to put the A's back in the lead. In the bottom of the 9th inning, Al Kaline pinch hit for McLain. Kaline drew a walk and later scored on an error. Willie Horton then drove in Mickey Stanley for the winning run. McLain struck out 10 batters and beat the A's, 5–4, to become the first 30-game winner since Dizzy Dean in 1934.
- September 15: The Tigers destroyed the A's, 13–0. Mickey Lolich went the distance, allowing only 3 hits. Jim Northrup and Bill Freehan hit two home runs each.
- September 17: The Tigers beat the Yankees, 2–1, to clinch the American League pennant. Joe Sparma threw a complete game and gave up 5 hits. Don Wert had the pennant-clinching hit in the bottom of the 9th inning, driving in Al Kaline. Many of the 46,512 fans on hand stormed the field in celebration of the Tigers' first pennant in 23 years.
- September 19: Denny McLain won his 31st game against the Yankees. In the 8th inning, with the Tigers safely in the lead, McLain called catcher Jim Price to the mound and told him to inform Mickey Mantle that he's throwing nothing but fastballs. McLain tossed up a fat one, and Mantle hit a home run to move into 3rd place on the all-time home run list. Mantle, who was planning to retire at the end of the season, tipped his cap to McLain as he rounded third base. Joe Pepitone‚ the next batter‚ signaled where he would like the ball‚ and McLain "dusted" him. Outfielder Mickey Stanley made his major-league debut at shortstop in this game, as Mayo Smith was preparing to use him at that position in the World Series.
- September 21: The Tigers won their 11th straight game, a 4–3 victory over the Senators. The team was now 47 games over .500 with a record of 101–54.
- September 23: Going for his 32nd win, Denny McLain surrendered just 2 runs, but lost a 2–1 decision to Baltimore.
- September 28: In his second attempt at win number 32‚ McLain pitched 7 scoreless innings against Washington and left with a 1–0 lead, but the Senators scored 2 in the 9th to win‚ 2–1.
- September 29: The Tigers lost the final game of the regular season, 3–2. The Tigers finished the season with a record of 103–59.

== Game log ==
Past games legend
Tigers Win (#bfb)	Tigers Loss (#fbb)	Game postponed (#bbb)	All-Star Game (#bbcaff)	Clinched Pennant (#039)
Bold denotes a Tigers pitcher

=== Regular season ===
1968 Game Log (103–59)
April (12–5)

#	Date	Opponent	Score	Win	Loss	Save	Crowd	Record	Streak
—	April 9	Red Sox	Postponed (Funeral of Martin Luther King Jr.); Makeup: April 10						
1	April 10	Red Sox	3–7	Ellsworth (1–0)	**Wilson** (0–1)		41,429	0–1	L1
2	April 11	Red Sox	4–3	**Warden** (1–0)	Wyatt (0–1)		6,142	1–1	W1
3	April 13	White Sox	5–2	**Patterson** (1–0)	Peters (0–1)	**Lasher** (1)	10,147	2–1	W2
4	April 14	White Sox	5–4 (10)	**Lasher** (1–0)	Locker (0–1)		8,744	3–1	W3
—	April 15	@ Red Sox	Postponed (rain); Makeup: June 4						
5	April 16	@ Red Sox	9–2	**Wilson** (1–1)	Culp (0–1)		32,849	4–1	W4
6	April 17	Indians	4–3 (10)	**Warden** (2–0)	Fisher (0–1)		9,970	5–1	W5
7	April 18	Indians	5–0	**Sparma** (1–0)	Hargan (0–2)		9,753	6–1	W6
—	April 19	@ White Sox	Postponed (cold); Makeup: April 21						
8	April 20	@ White Sox	4–1 (10)	**Warden** (3–0)	Wood (0–1)	**Ribant** (1)	4,067	7–1	W7
9	April 21	@ White Sox	4–1	**Wilson** (2–1)	Horlen (0–3)		–	8–1	W8
10	April 21	@ White Sox	4–2	**McLain** (1–0)	Carlos (0–2)		11,543	9–1	W9
—	April 23	@ Indians	Postponed (rain); Makeup: June 24						
11	April 24	@ Indians	0–2	Hargan (1–2)	**Sparma** (1–1)		4,636	9–2	L1
12	April 26	@ Yankees	0–5	Stottlemyre (3–1)	**Wilson** (2–2)		12,836	9–3	L2
13	April 27	@ Yankees	7–0	**McLain** (2–0)	Peterson (1–1)		11,078	10–3	W1
14	April 28	@ Yankees	1–2	Monbouquette (3–1)	**Sparma** (1–2)	Hamilton (1)	–	10–4	L1
15	April 28	@ Yankees	3–2	**Hiller** (1–0)	Womack (0–3)	**Lasher** (2)	38,734	11–4	W1
16	April 29	Athletics	2–1	**Lolich** (1–0)	Aker (1–1)		9,125	12–4	W2
17	April 30	Athletics	1–3	Lindblad (2–0)	**Wilson** (2–3)		8,791	12–5	L1

May (16–11)

#	Date	Opponent	Score	Win	Loss	Save	Crowd	Record	Streak
18	May 1	Twins	3–2	**McLain** (3–0)	Merritt (3–2)		17,523	13–5	W1
19	May 2	Twins	2–3 (10)	Chance (3–3)	**Ribant** (0–1)	Worthington (4)	16,801	13–6	L1
20	May 3	Angels	5–6	Hamilton (3–1)	**Lolich** (1–1)	Ellis (1)	16,242	13–7	L2
21	May 4	Angels	2–7	McGlothlin (2–2)	**Wilson** (2–4)		8,997	13–8	L3
22	May 5	Angels	5–2	**McLain** (4–0)	Brunet (2–3)		14,125	14–8	W1
23	May 6	@ Orioles	0–4	Leonhard (2–0)	**Sparma** (1–3)		8,000	14–9	L1
24	May 7	@ Orioles	2–1	**Lolich** (2–1)	Phoebus (4–2)	**Warden** (1)	15,215	15–9	W1
25	May 8	@ Orioles	3–1	**Wilson** (3–4)	McNally (3–2)	**Warden** (2)	12,031	16–9	W2
26	May 10	@ Senators	12–1	**McLain** (5–0)	Moore (0–3)		9,504	17–9	W3
27	May 11	@ Senators	12–2	**Sparma** (2–3)	Bertaina (1–2)		3,435	18–9	W4
28	May 12	@ Senators	3–6	Coleman (2–2)	**Patterson** (1–1)		13,200	18–10	L1
29	May 14	Orioles	4–0	**Wilson** (4–4)	McNally (3–3)		18,123	19–10	W1
30	May 15	Orioles	8–10	Watt (1–2)	**McLain** (5–1)		20,358	19–11	L1
31	May 17	Senators	7–3	**Sparma** (3–3)	Jones (0–1)		18,168	20–11	W1
32	May 18	Senators	4–8	Bertaina (2–2)	**Lolich** (2–2)		13,887	20–12	L1
33	May 19	Senators	5–4	**Lasher** (2–0)	Jones (0–2)	**Hiller** (1)	–	21–12	W1
34	May 19	Senators	7–0	**Cain** (1–0)	Pascual (3–3)	**Lasher** (3)	45,491	22–12	W2
35	May 20	@ Twins	4–3 (10)	**McLain** (6–1)	Merritt (3–4)		10,007	23–12	W3
36	May 21	@ Twins	1–3	Chance (4–4)	**Sparma** (3–4)		9,024	23–13	L1
37	May 22	@ Twins	3–4	Perranoski (4–0)	**Lasher** (2–1)	Worthington (9)	13,972	23–14	L2
38	May 24	@ Athletics	2–2 (7)				9,378	23–14	
39	May 25	@ Athletics	2–1	**McLain** (7–1)	Krausse (1–6)		29,484	24–14	W1
40	May 26	@ Athletics	6–7 (10)	Lindblad (3–0)	**Hiller** (1–1)		14,587	24–15	L1
41	May 27	@ Angels	6–7 (12)	Wright (4–1)	**Patterson** (1–2)		8,712	24–16	L2
42	May 28	@ Angels	4–1	**Hiller** (2–1)	Brunet (5–4)		19,601	25–16	W1
43	May 29	@ Angels	3–0	**McLain** (8–1)	McGlothlin (4–3)		13,840	26–16	W2
44	May 30	@ Angels	7–3	**Sparma** (4–4)	Clark (0–4)	**Lasher** (4)	14,890	27–16	W3
45	May 31	Yankees	1–0	**Lolich** (3–2)	Stottlemyre (6–4)		31,155	28–16	W4

June (20–11)

#	Date	Opponent	Score	Win	Loss	Save	Crowd	Record	Streak
46	June 1	Yankees	5–4	**Lasher** (3–1)	Womack (0–4)		11,237	29–16	W5
47	June 2	Yankees	3–4	Verbanic (3–2)	**Warden** (3–1)		–	29–17	L1
48	June 2	Yankees	8–1	**Hiller** (3–1)	Barber (0–1)		43,912	30–17	W1
49	June 3	@ Red Sox	3–4	Santiago (6–3)	**Sparma** (4–5)	Lyle (2)	17,552	30–18	L1
50	June 4	@ Red Sox	0–2	Bell (5–1)	**Lolich** (3–3)	Lyle (3)	–	30–19	L2
51	June 4	@ Red Sox	2–0	**Dobson** (1–0)	Waslewski (2–7)		31,698	31–19	W1
52	June 5	@ Red Sox	5–4	**McLain** (9–1)	Landis (0–1)	**Patterson** (1)	22,385	32–19	W2
53	June 6	@ Red Sox	5–3	**Sparma** (5–5)	Stange (2–2)	**Lasher** (5)	16,513	33–19	W3
54	June 7	Indians	5–4	**Lasher** (4–1)	Paul (0–1)		31,646	34–19	W4
55	June 8	Indians	3–1	**Lolich** (4–3)	McDowell (6–4)		28,100	35–19	W5
56	June 9	Indians	0–2	Tiant (9–4)	**McLain** (9–2)		52,938	35–20	L1
57	June 11	Twins	3–1	**Dobson** (2–0)	Chance (4–8)	**Patterson** (2)	–	36–20	W1
58	June 11	Twins	3–2	**Hiller** (4–1)	Worthington (2–2)		26,662	37–20	W2
59	June 12	Twins	2–1	**Lolich** (5–3)	Kaat (3–3)		20,082	38–20	W3
60	June 13	Twins	3–1	**McLain** (10–2)	Merritt (4–6)		13,880	39–20	W4
61	June 14	@ White Sox	6–5 (14)	**Hiller** (5–1)	Priddy (0–3)		18,520	40–20	W5
62	June 15	@ White Sox	4–7	John (5–0)	**Sparma** (5–6)	Wood (7)	9,326	40–21	L1
63	June 16	@ White Sox	2–3	Wilhelm (2–1)	**Lolich** (5–4)	Wood (8)	–	40–22	L2
64	June 16	@ White Sox	6–1	**McLain** (11–2)	Carlos (2–7)	**Dobson** (1)	21,853	41–22	W1
65	June 18	Red Sox	2–1	**Wilson** (5–4)	Santiago (7–4)	**Dobson** (2)	25,140	42–22	W2
66	June 19	Red Sox	5–8	Landis (2–1)	**Sparma** (5–7)	Stange (5)	30,573	42–23	L1
67	June 20	Red Sox	5–1	**McLain** (12–2)	Ellsworth (5–5)		30,977	43–23	W1
68	June 21	@ Indians	3–4 (13)	Fisher (2–2)	**Dobson** (2–1)		20,341	43–24	L1
69	June 22	@ Indians	0–2	Hargan (5–7)	**Wilson** (5–5)	Williams (3)	11,433	43–25	L2
70	June 23	@ Indians	0–3	Tiant (11–5)	**Hiller** (5–2)		–	43–26	L3
71	June 23	@ Indians	4–1	**Sparma** (6–7)	McDowell (7–6)	**Dobson** (3)	44,245	44–26	W1
72	June 24	@ Indians	14–3	**McLain** (13–2)	Paul (0–4)		12,808	45–26	W2
73	June 25	@ Yankees	8–5	**Ribant** (1–1)	Monbouquette (5–6)	**Dobson** (4)	17,117	46–26	W3
—	June 26	@ Yankees	Postponed (rain); Makeup: August 23						
—	June 28	White Sox	Postponed (rain); Makeup: August 20						
74	June 28	White Sox	5–4	**Lasher** (5–1)	Wood (5–3)		37,433	47–26	W4
75	June 29	White Sox	5–2	**McLain** (14–2)	Carlos (3–8)		34,001	48–26	W5
76	June 30	White Sox	0–12	John (7–0)	**Sparma** (6–8)		45,114	48–27	L1

July (17–12)

#	Date	Opponent	Score	Win	Loss	Save	Crowd	Record	Streak
77	July 1	Angels	5–1	**Lolich** (6–4)	Brunet (6–9)		24,659	49–27	W1
78	July 2	Angels	3–1	**Wilson** (6–5)	Murphy (2–1)		17,892	50–27	W2
79	July 3	Angels	5–2	**McLain** (15–2)	McGlothlin (6–5)		23,109	51–27	W3
80	July 4	Angels	13–10	**Ribant** (2–1)	Burgmeier (1–3)	**Hiller** (2)	18,186	52–27	W4
81	July 5	Athletics	8–5	**Lolich** (7–4)	Hunter (6–7)	**Dobson** (5)	24,434	53–27	W5
82	July 6	Athletics	1–4	Dobson (6–8)	**Wilson** (6–6)		26,008	53–28	L1
83	July 7	Athletics	5–4	**McLain** (16–2)	Sprague (3–2)		–	54–28	W1
84	July 7	Athletics	7–6	**Sparma** (7–8)	Nash (6–6)	**Lolich** (1)	36,685	55–28	W2
ASG	July 9	AL @ NL	0–1	Drysdale (1–0)	Tiant (0–1)	Koosman (1)	48,321	—	N/A
85	July 11	@ Twins	4–5	Perranoski (6–2)	**Hiller** (5–3)		25,330	55–29	L1
86	July 12	@ Twins	5–1	**McLain** (17–2)	Kaat (6–6)		27,342	56–29	W1
87	July 13	@ Twins	6–7 (14)	Roland (2–0)	**Ribant** (2–2)		26,079	56–30	L1
88	July 14	@ Angels	3–7	Ellis (7–6)	**Wilson** (6–7)	Locke (1)	19,971	56–31	L2
89	July 15	@ Angels	0–4	Brunet (9–9)	**Lolich** (7–5)		22,098	56–32	L3
90	July 16	@ Athletics	4–0	**McLain** (18–2)	Dobson (7–9)		15,587	57–32	W1
91	July 17	@ Athletics	2–3	Hunter (7–8)	**Sparma** (7–9)		12,130	57–33	L1
92	July 18	@ Athletics	3–1	**Wilson** (7–7)	Krausse (6–8)		11,856	58–33	W1
93	July 19	Orioles	5–4	**Dobson** (3–1)	Drabowsky (2–3)		53,208	59–33	W2
94	July 20	Orioles	3–5	McNally (11–8)	**McLain** (18–3)	O'Donoghue (2)	31,748	59–34	L1
95	July 21	Orioles	2–5	Hardin (12–5)	**Wilson** (7–8)		–	59–35	L2
96	July 21	Orioles	1–4	Phoebus (10–9)	**Dobson** (3–2)	Brabender (1)	48,568	59–36	L3
97	July 23	@ Senators	6–4	**McLain** (19–3)	Ortega (4–9)	**Warden** (3)	12,368	60–36	W1
98	July 24	@ Senators	3–6	Hannan (4–2)	**Lolich** (7–6)	Moore (2)	7,065	60–37	L1
99	July 25	@ Senators	4–1 (7)	**Sparma** (8–9)	B. Howard (1–5)		6,754	61–37	W1
100	July 26	@ Orioles	4–1	**Wilson** (8–8)	Hardin (12–6)	**Patterson** (3)	35,627	62–37	W2
101	July 27	@ Orioles	9–0	**McLain** (20–3)	Phoebus (10–10)		45,729	63–37	W3
102	July 28	@ Orioles	1–5	McNally (13–8)	**Lolich** (7–7)		25,872	63–38	L1
103	July 29	Yankees	2–7	Verbanic (4–4)	**Sparma** (8–10)	McDaniel (4)	31,231	63–39	L2
104	July 30	Yankees	5–0	**Wilson** (9–8)	Stottlemyre (13–8)	**Patterson** (4)	33,308	64–39	W1
105	July 31	Senators	4–0	**McLain** (21–3)	Bertaina (4–9)		37,453	65–39	W2

August (20–12)

#	Date	Opponent	Score	Win	Loss	Save	Crowd	Record	Streak
106	August 1	Senators	3–9	Coleman (7–12)	**Dobson** (3–3)		18,278	65–40	L1
107	August 2	@ Twins	6–5	**McMahon** (3–1)	Miller (0–2)	**Patterson** (5)	24,514	66–40	W1
108	August 3	@ Twins	0–4	Chance (10–10)	**Wilson** (9–9)		22,828	66–41	L1
109	August 4	@ Twins	2–1	**McLain** (22–3)	Kaat (8–7)		28,911	67–41	W1
110	August 6	Indians	2–1 (17)	**Wyatt** (2–4)	Paul (0–6)		–	68–41	W2
111	August 6	Indians	5–2	**Lolich** (8–7)	Williams (8–7)	**Wyatt** (1)	48,413	69–41	W3
112	August 7	Indians	6–1	**Wilson** (10–9)	McDowell (12–10)	**Patterson** (6)	30,402	70–41	W4
113	August 8	Indians	13–1	**McLain** (23–3)	Siebert (11–9)		23,904	71–41	W5
114	August 9	Red Sox	3–5	Stange (4–3)	**Dobson** (3–4)		41,674	71–42	L1
115	August 10	Red Sox	4–3	**Lolich** (9–7)	Landis (3–3)		27,964	72–42	W1
116	August 11	Red Sox	5–4 (14)	**Lolich** (10–7)	Stange (4–4)		–	73–42	W2
117	August 11	Red Sox	6–5	**Warden** (4–1)	Stephenson (1–7)		49,087	74–42	W3
118	August 12	@ Indians	6–3	**McLain** (24–3)	Romo (1–3)		15,919	75–42	W4
119	August 13	@ Indians	0–1	Siebert (12–9)	**Dobson** (3–5)		16,319	75–43	L1
120	August 14	@ Indians	3–0	**Lolich** (11–7)	Tiant (18–8)		17,312	76–43	W1
121	August 16	@ Red Sox	4–0	**McLain** (25–3)	Lonborg (3–4)		35,323	77–43	W2
122	August 17	@ Red Sox	10–9 (11)	**McMahon** (4–1)	Stange (4–5)	**Wyatt** (2)	28,778	78–43	W3
123	August 18	@ Red Sox	1–4	Pizarro (5–4)	**Wilson** (10–10)		31,428	78–44	L1
124	August 20	White Sox	7–0	**Hiller** (6–3)	Fisher (6–8)		–	79–44	W1
125	August 20	White Sox	2–10	Peters (4–10)	**McLain** (25–4)		48,814	79–45	L1
126	August 21	White Sox	3–2 (10)	**Patterson** (2–2)	Wood (8–9)		29,540	80–45	W1
127	August 22	White Sox	4–2	**Lolich** (12–7)	Ribant (2–3)	**McMahon** (1)	25,931	81–45	W2
128	August 23	@ Yankees	1–2	Bahnsen (12–9)	**Wilson** (10–11)		–	81–46	L1
129	August 23	@ Yankees	3–3 (19)				33,880	81–46	
130	August 24	@ Yankees	1–2	Stottlemyre (17–10)	**McLain** (25–5)		28,840	81–47	L2
131	August 25	@ Yankees	5–6	Colavito (1–0)	**Patterson** (2–3)	McDaniel (8)	–	81–48	L3
132	August 25	@ Yankees	4–5	Hamilton (2–1)	**Lolich** (12–8)		31,291	81–49	L4
133	August 26	@ White Sox	3–0	**Wilson** (11–11)	Carlos (4–12)		42,808	82–49	W1
134	August 27	@ White Sox	1–2	Wood (10–9)	**Hiller** (6–4)		10,656	82–50	L1
135	August 28	Angels	6–1	**McLain** (26–5)	Burgmeier (1–4)		35,740	83–50	W1
136	August 29	Angels	2–0	**Lolich** (13–8)	Brunet (13–13)		23,964	84–50	W2
137	August 30	Orioles	9–1	**Wilson** (12–11)	Phoebus (13–13)		53,575	85–50	W3
138	August 31	Orioles	1–5	McNally (18–8)	**Hiller** (6–5)		28,974	85–51	L1

September (18–8)

#	Date	Opponent	Score	Win	Loss	Save	Crowd	Record	Streak
139	September 1	Orioles	7–3	**McLain** (27–5)	Hardin (17–10)		41,698	86–51	W1
140	September 2	@ Athletics	0–4	Nash (11–11)	**Lolich** (13–9)		–	86–52	L1
141	September 2	@ Athletics	4–3 (10)	**Dobson** (4–5)	Seguí (5–3)		20,464	87–52	W1
142	September 3	@ Athletics	6–3	**Dobson** (5–5)	Sprague (3–4)		5,955	88–52	W2
143	September 4	@ Athletics	4–2	**Hiller** (7–5)	Dobson (11–13)	**Dobson** (6)	3,388	89–52	W3
144	September 6	Twins	8–3	**McLain** (28–5)	Kaat (12–11)		42,269	90–52	W4
145	September 7	Twins	1–2	Worthington (4–5)	**Dobson** (5–6)		35,814	90–53	L1
146	September 8	Twins	1–3	Chance (14–14)	**Wilson** (12–12)		27,777	90–54	L2
147	September 9	@ Angels	6–0	**Lolich** (14–9)	Bennett (0–4)		10,299	91–54	W1
148	September 10	@ Angels	7–2	**McLain** (29–5)	Messersmith (3–1)		22,618	92–54	W2
149	September 11	@ Angels	8–2	**Hiller** (8–5)	Brunet (13–16)		9,261	93–54	W3
150	September 13	Athletics	3–0	**Wilson** (13–12)	Hunter (12–13)		25,455	94–54	W4
151	September 14	Athletics	5–4	**McLain** (30–5)	Seguí (5–5)		33,688	95–54	W5
152	September 15	Athletics	13–0	**Lolich** (15–9)	Krausse (10–11)		23,260	96–54	W6
153	September 16	Yankees	9–1	**Hiller** (9–5)	Verbanic (6–6)		28,354	97–54	W7
154	September 17	Yankees	2–1	**Sparma** (9–10)	Hamilton (2–2)		46,512	98–54	W8
—	September 18	Yankees	Postponed (rain); Makeup: September 19						
155	September 19	Yankees	6–2	**McLain** (31–5)	Stottlemyre (20–12)		9,063	99–54	W9
156	September 20	@ Senators	6–3	**Lolich** (16–9)	Humphreys (4–7)	**Dobson** (7)	5,929	100–54	W10
157	September 21	@ Senators	4–3	**Sparma** (10–10)	Cox (0–1)		4,075	101–54	W11
158	September 22	@ Senators	0–6	Pascual (13–12)	**Hiller** (9–6)		7,327	101–55	L1
159	September 23	@ Orioles	1–2	Nelson (6–3)	**McLain** (31–6)	Richert (6)	7,559	101–56	L2
160	September 24	@ Orioles	5–3	**Lolich** (17–9)	Hardin (18–13)	**Patterson** (7)	6,943	102–56	W1
161	September 25	@ Orioles	4–3	**McMahon** (5–1)	Phoebus (15–15)		6,344	103–56	W2
162	September 27	Senators	1–3	Coleman (12–16)	**Dobson** (5–7)		26,361	103–57	L1
163	September 28	Senators	1–2	Humphreys (5–7)	**McMahon** (5–2)		18,393	103–58	L2
164	September 29	Senators	2–3	Moore (4–6)	**Dobson** (5–8)	Higgins (13)	24,198	103–59	L3

=== Postseason ===
1968 Postseason game log (4–3)
World Series vs. St. Louis Cardinals

#	Date	Opponent	Score	Win	Loss	Save	Crowd	Series
1	October 2	@ Cardinals	0–4	Gibson (1–0)	**McLain** (0–1)		54,692	0–1
2	October 3	@ Cardinals	8–1	**Lolich** (1–0)	Briles (0–1)		54,692	1–1
3	October 5	Cardinals	3–7	Washburn (1–0)	**Wilson** (0–1)	Hoerner (1)	53,634	1–2
4	October 6	Cardinals	1–10	Gibson (2–0)	**McLain** (0–2)		53,634	1–3
5	October 7	Cardinals	5–3	**Lolich** (2–0)	Hoerner (0–1)		53,634	2–3
6	October 9	@ Cardinals	10–1	**McLain** (1–2)	Washburn (1–1)		54,692	3–3
7	October 10	@ Cardinals	4–1	**Lolich** (3–0)	Gibson (2–1)		54,692	4–3

== Player stats ==
= Indicates team leader

= Indicates league leader

=== Batting ===
==== Starters by position ====
Note: Pos = Position; G = Games played; AB = At bats; H = Hits; Avg. = Batting average; HR = Home runs; RBI = Runs batted in

Pos	Player	G	AB	H	Avg.	HR	RBI
C	Bill Freehan	155	540	142	.263	25	84
1B	Norm Cash	127	411	108	.263	25	63
2B	Dick McAuliffe	151	570	142	.249	16	56
3B	Don Wert	150	536	107	.200	12	37
SS	Ray Oyler	111	215	29	.135	1	12
LF	Willie Horton	143	512	146	.285	36	85
CF	Mickey Stanley	153	583	151	.259	11	60
RF	Jim Northrup	154	580	153	.264	21	90

==== Other batters ====
Note: G = Games played; AB = At bats; H = Hits; Avg. = Batting average; HR = Home runs; RBI = Runs batted in

Player	G	AB	H	Avg.	HR	RBI
Al Kaline	102	327	94	.287	10	53
Tom Matchick	80	227	46	.203	3	14
Dick Tracewski	90	212	33	.156	4	15
Jim Price	64	132	23	.174	3	13
Gates Brown	67	92	34	.370	6	15
Eddie Mathews	31	52	11	.212	3	8
Wayne Comer	48	48	6	.125	1	3
Dave Campbell	9	8	1	.125	1	2
Lenny Green	6	4	1	.250	0	0
Bob Christian	3	3	1	.333	0	0

Note: Pitchers' batting statistics not included

=== Pitching ===
==== Starting pitchers ====
Note: G = Games pitched; IP = Innings pitched; W = Wins; L = Losses; ERA = Earned run average; SO = Strikeouts

Player	G	IP	W	L	ERA	SO
Denny McLain	41	336.0	31	6	1.96	280
Earl Wilson	34	224.1	13	12	2.85	168
Mickey Lolich	39	220.0	17	9	3.19	197
Joe Sparma	34	182.1	10	10	3.70	110

==== Other pitchers ====
Note: G = Games pitched; IP = Innings pitched; W = Wins; L = Losses; ERA = Earned run average; SO = Strikeouts

Player	G	IP	W	L	ERA	SO
John Hiller	39	128.0	9	6	2.39	78
Pat Dobson	47	125.0	5	8	2.66	93
Les Cain	8	24.0	1	0	3.00	13

Note: Pat Dobson was tied with Darryl Patterson in saves with 7.

==== Relief pitchers ====
Note: G = Games pitched; W = Wins; L = Losses; SV = Saves; GF = Games finished; ERA = Earned run average; SO = Strikeouts

Player	G	W	L	SV	GF	ERA	SO
Daryl Patterson	38	2	3	7	22	2.12	49
Fred Lasher	34	5	1	5	14	3.33	32
Jon Warden	28	4	1	3	11	3.62	25
John Wyatt	22	1	0	2	10	2.37	25
Don McMahon	20	3	1	1	9	2.02	33
Dennis Ribant	14	2	2	1	4	2.22	7
Jim Rooker	2	0	0	0	0	3.86	4
Roy Face	2	0	0	0	0	0.00	1

== 1968 World Series ==
=== Summary ===
The 1968 World Series featured the Detroit Tigers and the St. Louis Cardinals, with the Tigers winning in seven games for their third championship in seven World Series appearances.

In Game 1, the Cardinals' ace Bob Gibson threw a shutout, striking out 17 batters, as St. Louis won 4–0. As of 2011, Gibson's 17 strikeouts is still the record in a World Series game. The only positive the Tigers could take away from Game 1 was that Mickey Stanley, having moved from center field to shortstop at the end of the season, handled five chances without an error.

In Game 2, Mickey Lolich hit a home run and pitched the first of his three complete game victories, as Detroit won, 8–1. Norm Cash and Willie Horton both homered, and perennial Gold Glove winner, Al Kaline, made two sensational catches in right field.

The Cardinals followed with wins in Games 3 and 4, including another victory by Bob Gibson over Denny McLain in Game 4. Lou Brock stole three bases in Game 3 and had six steals in the first three games. In Game 4, McLain pitched poorly, giving up six runs in three innings. Game 4 also saw one of the most bizarre strategic battles in World Series history. The Cardinals led 4–0 in the third inning, when the game was delayed by rain for over an hour. When play resumed, the Tigers began to stall, hoping to have the game called before it became official. The Cardinals responded by intentionally trying to make outs to move the game forward. As a result of the tactics, Game 4 of the 1968 series was criticized as one of the worst games in World Series history.

After Game 4, with the Cardinals up 3 games to 1, a Detroit team that had made dramatic comebacks all year was forced to make its biggest comeback yet.

Game 5 began with the unconventional, soulful singing of the national anthem by José Feliciano, drawing boos from some Detroit fans. When the game got underway, the Cardinals immediately scored three runs in the first inning off Mickey Lolich. In the fifth inning, Lou Brock doubled, and the Cardinals had a chance to break the game open, but Brock tried to score from second base on a single to left field. Brock was out in a collision with Bill Freehan at home plate, as Willie Horton's throw hit Bill Freehan's glove on the fly, and Brock elected not to slide. Brock later remarked that he never slid because no one had ever tried to throw him out at home. In the 7th inning, the Cardinals led, 3–2. Mickey Lolich led off for the Tigers in the 7th inning with a bloop single, and the Tigers loaded the bases for Al Kaline to slap a single into right field, driving in two runs. Cash drove in another run, and the Tigers led, 5–3, which proved to be the final score. Mickey Lolich pitched his second complete game victory.

In Game 6, Mayo Smith passed over Earl Wilson and elected to start Denny McLain on two days' rest. McLain held the Cardinals to one run, and the Tigers scored 13 times. The Tigers scored ten runs in the 3rd inning, capped by Jim Northrup's grand slam.

Game 7 was a pitching duel between Bob Gibson and Mickey Lolich, pitching on only two days' rest. In a pre-game pep talk, Mayo Smith told his team that Gibson was not Superman, prompting Norm Cash to ask: "What was he doing in a telephone booth changing his clothes?" The game was scoreless after six innings, as the two pitchers dominated. In the 7th inning, the Tigers broke through on a triple by Jim Northrup that went over center fielder Curt Flood's head, driving in Norm Cash and Willie Horton. Curt Flood initially misread Northrup's hit, taking a step in, and then slipping as he chased the ball over his head. Flood was tagged a "goat" for having misplayed the ball. The Tigers won Game 7 by a score of 4–1.

Mickey Lolich, who pitched three complete game victories, was named the MVP of the World Series. On the plane ride back to Detroit after Game 7 of the World Series, Lolich turned to newspaper columnist, Pete Waldmeir, and said: "I guess I'm an unlikely hero. Pot belly. Big ears. Just a guy who shows up every day and gets the job done as best as he knows how." But it was precisely those "average man" qualities that made Lolich one of the most popular sports figures in a working man's city. As the Detroit News put it, "He didn't act like a big shot superstar, he was one of us."

=== The Tigers' role in healing a city ===
The 1968 baseball season occurred in a year of upheaval. The Tet Offensive earlier in the year increased opposition to the Vietnam War. The City of Detroit had suffered through one of the worst riots in American history during the summer of 1967. Less than a week before Opening Day, the assassination of Martin Luther King Jr. took place in Memphis, triggering civil unrest in over 100 American cities, including in Detroit. The assassination of Robert F. Kennedy followed in June. And in late August, the Tigers played a series in Chicago, as Chicago police had violent confrontations with thousands of anti-war protesters during the Democratic National Convention. Yet, through the summer of 1968, the people of Detroit were united by their passion for the Tigers and the calming radio voice of Tigers broadcaster, Ernie Harwell. When the Tigers won the World Series, the headline in the Detroit Free Press read: "WE WIN!" The headline told the story. Amidst all the turmoil, the people of Detroit came together behind their baseball team.

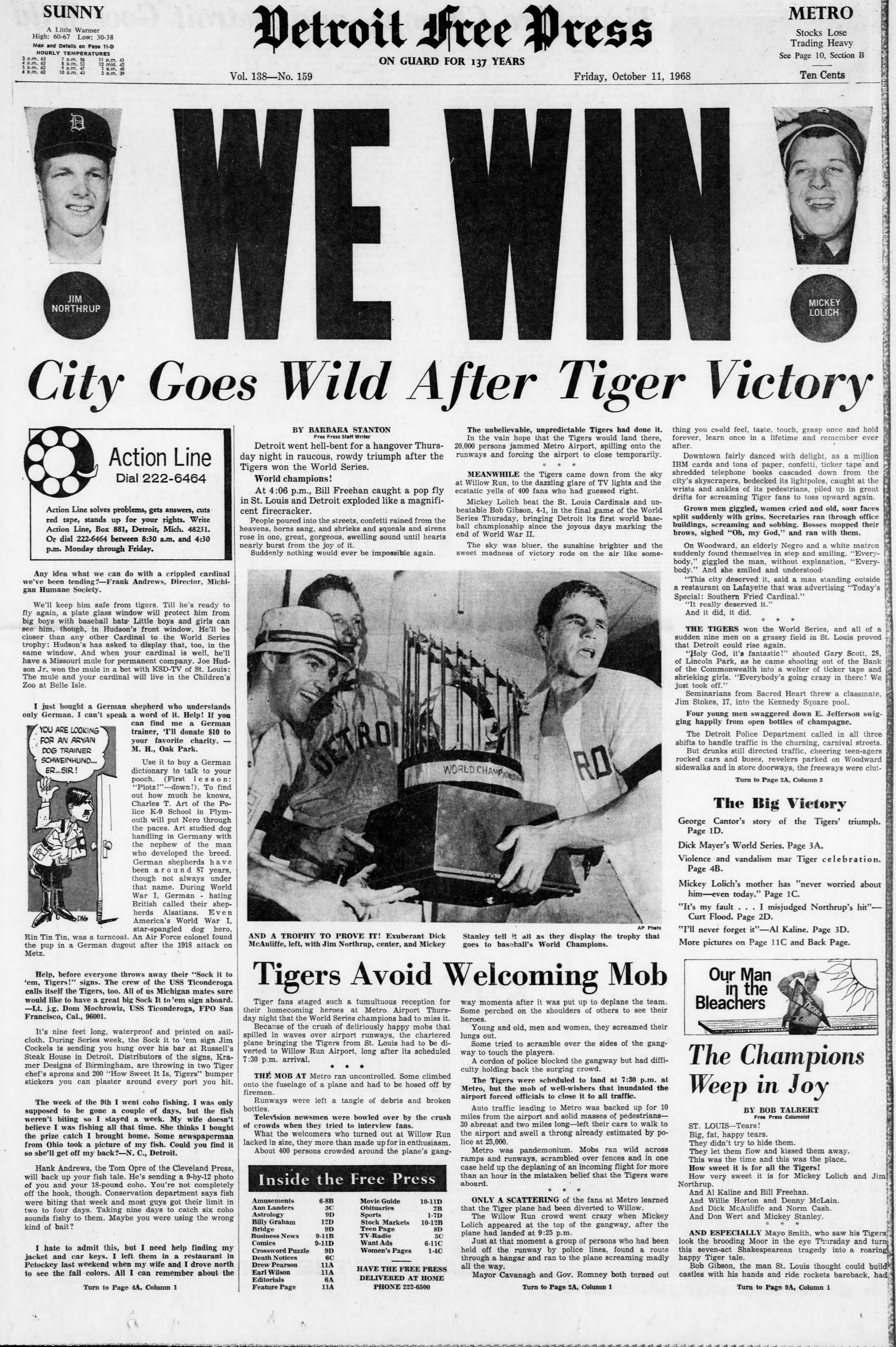
Tigers Win the Series

In a column published on October 11, 1968, Detroit's senior baseball writer, Joe Falls, described the impact of the Tigers championship on the city.

- My town, as you know, had the worst riot in our nation's history in the summer of 1967, and it left scars which may never fully heal. . . . And so, as 1968 dawned and we all started thinking ahead to the hot summer nights in Detroit, the mood of our city was taut. It was apprehensive. . . . But then something started happening in the middle of 1968. You could pull up to a light at the corner of Clairmount and 12th, which was the hub of last year's riot, and the guy in the next car would have his radio turned up: ' .... McLain looks in for the sign, he's set – here's the pitch' ... It was a year when an entire community, an entire city, was caught up in a wild, wonderful frenzy.

Even the Governor of Michigan, George Romney, credited the Tigers with helping calm the city. In a letter to owner John Fetzer, Romney wrote: "The deepest meaning of this victory extends beyond the sports pages, radio broadcasts, and the telecasts that have consumed our attention for several months. This championship occurred when all of us in Detroit and Michigan needed a great lift. At a time of unusual tensions, when many good men lost their perspective toward others, the Tigers set an example of what human relations should really be."

World Series vs St. Louis Cardinals (Tigers win series 4–3)

#	Date	Opponent	Score	Win	Loss	Save	Crowd	Record
1	October 2	@ Cardinals	L 0–4	Gibson (1–0)	McLain (0–1)		54,692	0–1
2	October 3	@ Cardinals	W 8–1	Lolich (1–0)	Briles (0–1)		54,692	1–1
3	October 5	Cardinals	L 3–7	Washburn (1–0)	Wilson (0–1)	Hoerner (1)	53,634	1–2
4	October 6	Cardinals	L 1–10	Gibson (2–0)	McLain (0–2)		53,634	1–3
5	October 7	Cardinals	W 5–3	Lolich (2–0)	Hoerner (0–1)		53,634	2–3
6	October 9	@ Cardinals	W 13–1	McLain (1–2)	Washburn (1–1)		54,692	3–3
7	October 10	@ Cardinals	W 4–1	Lolich (3–0)	Gibson (2–1)		54,692	4–3

== Awards and honors ==
- Gold Glove Awards
  - Bill Freehan, catcher
  - Mickey Stanley, outfield
- Al Kaline, Lou Gehrig Memorial Award
- Mickey Lolich, Babe Ruth Award
- Mickey Lolich, World Series Most Valuable Player
- Denny McLain, American League Most Valuable Player
- Denny McLain, American League Cy Young Award
- Denny McLain, Associated Press Athlete of the Year
- Mayo Smith, Associated Press AL Manager of the Year

=== League leaders ===
Bill Freehan

- AL hit by pitch leader (24)
- AL innings at catcher leader (1180.1)
- AL leader in assists at catcher (971)
- AL leader in double plays at catcher (15)
- AL leader in runners caught stealing (38)

Dick McAuliffe

- AL runs scored leader (95)
- AL leader in innings at second base (1277.2)

Denny McLain

- AL wins leader (31)
- AL win percentage leader (.838)
- AL innings pitched leader (336)
- AL games started leader (41)
- AL complete games leader (28)
- AL home runs allowed leader (31)
- AL leader in strikeout to walk ratio (4.44)
- AL batters faced leader (1288)
- AL sacrifice hits leader (16)

Mickey Stanley

- AL leader in fielding percentage by outfielder (1.000)
- AL grounded into double plays leader (22)

=== All-Stars ===
1968 Major League Baseball All-Star Game

- Bill Freehan, C, starter
- Willie Horton, OF, starter
- Denny McLain, P
- Don Wert, 3B

=== Players ranking among top 100 of all time at position ===
The following members of the 1968 Tigers have been ranked among the Top 100 of all time at their position in The New Bill James Historical Baseball Abstract in 2001:

- Bill Freehan: 12th best catcher of all time
- Norm Cash: 20th best first baseman of all time
- Dick McAuliffe: 22nd best second baseman of all time
- Eddie Mathews: 3rd best third baseman of all time (Mathews appeared in only six games at third base for the 1968 Tigers)
- Willie Horton: 55th best left fielder of all time
- Al Kaline: 11th best right fielder of all time
- Mickey Lolich: 72nd best pitcher of all time

== Farm system ==
Level	Team	League	Manager
AAA	Toledo Mud Hens	International League	Jack Tighe
AA	Montgomery Rebels	Southern League	Frank Carswell
A	Rocky Mount Leafs	Carolina League	Al Federoff
A	Lakeland Tigers	Florida State League	Len Okrie
A-Short Season	Batavia Trojans	New York–Penn League	Bob Dustal
Rookie	GCL Tigers	Gulf Coast League	Wayne Blackburn
