= Bob Christian =

Bob Christian may refer to:

- Bob Christian (American football)
- Bob Christian (baseball)
- Bob Christian (basketball)
