= 1968 Boston Red Sox season =

Major League Baseball season

1968 Boston Red Sox
- League: American League
- Ballpark: Fenway Park
- City: Boston, Massachusetts
- Record: 86–76 (.531)
- League place: 4th
- Owners: Tom Yawkey
- President: Tom Yawkey
- General managers: Dick O'Connell
- Managers: Dick Williams
- Television: WHDH-TV, Ch, 5
- Radio: WHDH-AM 850 (Ken Coleman, Ned Martin, Mel Parnell)
- Stats: ESPN.com; Baseball Reference

The 1968 Boston Red Sox season was the 68th season in the franchise's Major League Baseball history. The Red Sox finished fourth in the American League (AL) with a record of 86 wins and 76 losses, 17 games behind the AL and World Series champion Detroit Tigers.

== Offseason ==
- October 29, 1968: Elston Howard was released by the Red Sox.

== Regular season ==
Carl Yastrzemski set an American League record by having the lowest batting average to win a batting title. Yaz hit .301 to claim the batting title.

=== Season standings ===
American League
Team	W	L	Pct.	GB	Home	Road
Detroit Tigers	103	59	.636	—	56‍–‍25	47‍–‍34
Baltimore Orioles	91	71	.562	12	47‍–‍33	44‍–‍38
Cleveland Indians	86	75	.534	16½	43‍–‍37	43‍–‍38
Boston Red Sox	86	76	.531	17	46‍–‍35	40‍–‍41
New York Yankees	83	79	.512	20	39‍–‍42	44‍–‍37
Oakland Athletics	82	80	.506	21	44‍–‍38	38‍–‍42
Minnesota Twins	79	83	.488	24	41‍–‍40	38‍–‍43
California Angels	67	95	.414	36	32‍–‍49	35‍–‍46
Chicago White Sox	67	95	.414	36	36‍–‍45	31‍–‍50
Washington Senators	65	96	.404	37½	34‍–‍47	31‍–‍49

=== Record vs. opponents ===
1968 American League record Sources:
Team	BAL	BOS	CAL	CWS	CLE	DET	MIN	NYY	OAK	WAS
Baltimore	—	9–9	10–8	11–7	7–11	8–10	10–8	13–5	9–9	14–4
Boston	9–9	—	9–9	14–4	10–8	6–12	9–9	10–8	8–10	11–7
California	8–10	9–9	—	8–10	7–11	5–13	7–11	6–12	5–13	12–6
Chicago	7–11	4–14	10–8	—	5–13	5–13	10–8	6–12	10–8	10–8
Cleveland	11–7	8–10	11–7	13–5	—	6–12	14–4	10–8–1	6–12	7–10
Detroit	10–8	12–6	13–5	13–5	12–6	—	10–8	10–8–1	13–5–1	10–8
Minnesota	8–10	9–9	11–7	8–10	4–14	8–10	—	12–6	8–10	11–7
New York	5–13	8–10	12–6	12–6	8–10–1	8–10–1	6–12	—	10–8	14–4
Oakland	9–9	10–8	13–5	8–10	12–6	5–13–1	10–8	8–10	—	7–11
Washington	4–14	7–11	6–12	8–10	10–7	8–10	7–11	4–14	11–7	—

=== Opening Day lineup ===
2	Mike Andrews	2B
3	Dalton Jones	3B
8	Carl Yastrzemski	LF
7	Reggie Smith	CF
5	George Scott	1B
15	Joe Lahoud	RF
6	Rico Petrocelli	SS
18	Elston Howard	C
36	Dick Ellsworth	P

=== Notable transactions ===
- August 7, 1968: Norm Siebern was released by the Red Sox.
- August 14, 1968: Galen Cisco was purchased from the Red Sox by the Kansas City Royals.

=== Roster ===
1968 Boston Red Sox
Roster
Pitchers: 39 Gary Bell; 27 Bucky Brandon; 21 Ray Culp; 36 Dick Ellsworth; 29 Bill Landis; 16 Jim Lonborg; 28 Sparky Lyle; 37 Dave Morehead; 24 Juan Pizarro; 17 Garry Roggenburk; 30 José Santiago; 20 Lee Stange; 38 Jerry Stephenson; 19 Gary Waslewski; 24 Fred Wenz; 26 John Wyatt	Catchers: 35 Russ Gibson; 18 Elston Howard; 10 Jerry Moses; 15 Russ Nixon; 22 Gene Oliver; Infielders: 14 Jerry Adair; 41 Luis Alvarado; 2 Mike Andrews; 1 Joe Foy; 3 Dalton Jones; 6 Rico Petrocelli; 5 George Scott; 4 Norm Siebern	Outfielders: 40 Ken Harrelson; 15 Joe Lahoud; 11 Floyd Robinson; 7 Reggie Smith; 12 José Tartabull; 17 George Thomas; 8 Carl Yastrzemski	Manager: 23 Dick Williams; Coaches: 31 Bobby Doerr (First base & Hitting); 33 Darrell Johnson (Pitching); 34 Al Lakeman (Bullpen); 32 Eddie Popowski (Third base)

== Player stats ==
=== Batting ===
==== Starters by position ====
Note: Pos = Position; G = Games played; AB = At bats; H = Hits; Avg. = Batting average; HR = Home runs; RBI = Runs batted in

Pos	Player	G	AB	H	Avg.	HR	RBI
C	Russ Gibson	76	231	52	.225	3	20
1B	George Scott	124	350	60	.171	3	25
2B	Mike Andrews	147	536	145	.271	7	45
SS	Rico Petrocelli	123	406	95	.234	12	46
3B	Joe Foy	150	515	116	.225	10	60
LF	Carl Yastrzemski	157	539	162	.301	23	74
CF	Reggie Smith	155	558	148	.265	15	69
RF	Ken Harrelson	150	535	147	.275	35	109

==== Other batters ====
Note: G = Games played; AB = At bats; H = Hits; Avg. = Batting average; HR = Home runs; RBI = Runs batted in

Player	G	AB	H	Avg.	HR	RBI
Dalton Jones	111	354	83	.234	5	29
Jerry Adair	74	208	45	.216	2	12
Elston Howard	71	203	49	.241	5	18
José Tartabull	72	139	39	.281	0	6
Russ Nixon	29	85	13	.153	0	6
Joe Lahoud	29	78	15	.192	1	6
Luis Alvarado	11	46	6	.130	0	1
Gene Oliver	16	35	5	.143	0	1
Norm Siebern	27	30	2	.067	0	0
Floyd Robinson	23	24	3	.125	0	2
Jerry Moses	6	18	6	.333	2	4
George Thomas	12	10	2	.200	1	1

=== Pitching ===
==== Starting pitchers ====
Note: G = Games pitched; IP = Innings pitched; W = Wins; L = Losses; ERA = Earned run average; SO = Strikeouts

Player	G	IP	W	L	ERA	SO
Ray Culp	35	216.1	16	6	2.91	190
Gary Bell	35	199.1	11	11	3.12	102
Dick Ellsworth	31	196.0	16	7	3.03	106
José Santiago	18	124.0	9	4	2.25	86
Jim Lonborg	23	113.1	6	10	4.29	73
Juan Pizarro	19	107.2	6	8	3.59	84
Dave Morehead	11	55.0	1	4	2.45	78

==== Other pitchers ====
Note: G = Games pitched; IP = Innings pitched; W = Wins; L = Losses; ERA = Earned run average; SO = Strikeouts

Player	G	IP	W	L	ERA	SO
Gary Waslewski	34	105.1	4	7	3.67	59
Jerry Stephenson	23	68.2	2	8	5.64	51

==== Relief pitchers ====
Note: G = Games pitched; W = Wins; L = Losses; SV = Saves; ERA = Earned run average; SO = Strikeouts

Player	G	W	L	SV	ERA	SO
Lee Stange	50	5	5	12	3.93	53
Sparky Lyle	49	6	1	11	2.74	52
Bill Landis	38	3	3	3	3.15	59
Bucky Brandon	8	0	0	0	6.39	10
John Wyatt	8	1	2	0	4.22	11
Garry Roggenburk	4	0	0	0	2.16	4
Fred Wenz	1	0	0	0	0.00	3

== Awards and honors ==
- George Scott, Gold Glove Award (1B)
- Reggie Smith, Gold Glove Award (OF)
- Carl Yastrzemski, Gold Glove Award (OF)

== Farm system ==
Level	Team	League	Manager
AAA	Louisville Colonels	International League	Eddie Kasko
AA	Pittsfield Red Sox	Eastern League	Billy Gardner
A	Winston-Salem Red Sox	Carolina League	Bill Slack
A	Waterloo Hawks	Midwest League	Rac Slider
A	Greenville Red Sox	Western Carolinas League	Matt Sczesny
A-Short Season	Jamestown Falcons	New York–Penn League	Jackie Moore
