= Don Wert =

American baseball player (1938–2024)

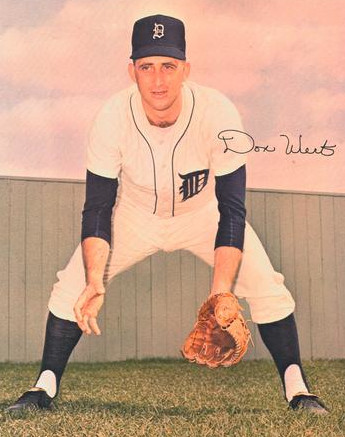
- Wert in 1966
- Third baseman
- Born: July 29, 1938; Strasburg, Pennsylvania, U.S.
- Died: August 24, 2024 (aged 86); Strasburg, Pennsylvania, U.S.
- Batted: Right Threw: Right

MLB debut
- May 11, 1963, for the Detroit Tigers

Last MLB appearance
- June 11, 1971, for the Washington Senators

MLB statistics
- Batting average: .242
- Home runs: 77
- Runs batted in: 365
- Stats at Baseball Reference

Teams
- Detroit Tigers (1963–1970); Washington Senators (1971)

Career highlights and awards
- All-Star (1968); World Series champion (1968)

Donald Ralph Wert (July 29, 1938 – August 24, 2024), nicknamed "Coyote", was an American professional baseball player. He played in Major League Baseball from 1963 to 1971 as a third baseman, most prominently as a member of the Detroit Tigers where he was an All-Star player and was a member of the 1968 World Series winning team.

Although he was overshadowed by his contemporary, Hall of Fame third baseman Brooks Robinson, Wert earned a reputation as one of the best fielding third basemen in Major League Baseball. He played his final season with the Washington Senators in 1971.

== Early life and education ==
Wert was born in Strasburg, Pennsylvania, in Lancaster County on July 29, 1938. He attended Franklin & Marshall College in Lancaster, Pennsylvania, where he played baseball for the Diplomats. He was signed by the Detroit Tigers as an amateur free agent in 1958 and played several years in the minor leagues.

== Career in Major League Baseball ==
=== 1963–1967 ===
Wert reached the major leagues in 1963 at the age of 24 and became the Tigers' regular third baseman in 1964. He remained their starting third baseman through the 1970 season. Though never a strong hitter, Wert earned a reputation as one of the best fielding third basemen. In 1965, Wert played all 162 games for the Tigers and led all American League third basemen with a .976 fielding percentage, marking the only year in the 1960s that a third baseman other than Brooks Robinson had led the league in fielding. He also led the team with 159 hits, had a .341 on-base percentage fueled by a career-high 73 walks, and even showed some power with hit 12 home runs. With his performance in 1965, Wert was selected for the first annual "Tiger of the Year" by the Detroit chapter of the Baseball Writers' Association of America, and also finished No. 10 in the American League Most Valuable Player voting. Wert had his best season as a batter in 1966, when he had a .268 batting average, .342 on-base percentage, 20 doubles, 11 home runs, and 70 runs batted in.

=== 1968–1971 ===
On June 24, 1968, during a game in which Jim Northrup hit two grand slams, Wert was struck in the head by a pitch from Hal Kurtz of the Cleveland Indians. The pitch split Wert's batting helmet. He was carried off on a stretcher, spent two nights in the hospital, missed several games, and "was never the same hitter after that". He had never hit lower than .257 in five prior seasons, but his batting average dropped to a career-low .200 in 1968, as he managed only 107 hits in 536 at bats.

Despite his low average, Wert was selected to the roster of the 1968 American League All Star Team by American League manager Dick Williams and doubled off Tom Seaver in the eighth inning, but was stranded in a 1–0 loss. He recorded a ninth inning, game-winning hit on September 17 to clinch the American League pennant. Wert also singled in Detroit's final run of the 1968 World Series, driving in Dick Tracewski with two out in the top of the ninth inning in St. Louis, completing the Tigers' comeback to top the defending Series champs, 4–1, winning the series, 4 games to 3.

On July 15, 1969, with President Richard Nixon attending the game in Washington, Wert started a triple play on a ground ball hit by Ed Brinkman. On July 9, 1970, Wert was involved in a bizarre play when Dalton Jones hit a fly ball into the upper deck with the bases loaded. What should have been a grand slam ended up being three-RBI single, as Jones passed Wert between first and second base. Jones was called out. Jones later blamed Wert, noting that Wert should have been halfway to second base, prepared to advance if it was a home run, and prepared to return to first if it was caught. Instead, Jones recalled that Wert was returning to first to tag up, and Jones passed Wert one or two steps past first base.

On October 9, 1970, the Tigers traded Wert and Denny McLain to the Washington Senators in an eight-player deal that brought Ed Brinkman, Aurelio Rodríguez, and Joe Coleman to the Tigers. Wert played 20 games for the Senators in 1971. He was batting .050 (two hits in 40 at bats) when he was released on June 24, 1971.

Over nine seasons in the major leagues, Wert played in 1,100 games and had a .242 batting average, 929 hits, 417 runs scored, 389 walks, 366 runs batted in, 129 doubles, and 77 home runs. Wert played 1,043 of his games at third base and collected 914 putouts, 1,987 assists, and 173 double plays.

== Death ==
Wert died at his Strasburg home on August 24, 2024, at the age of 86.
