= Leo Pinsky =

American baseball player (1926–2018)

Leo Pinsky (28 September 1926 in Hartford, Connecticut - 12 April 2018 in West Hartford, Connecticut) was a member of the Connecticut High School Coaches Hall of Fame and was the first Connecticut coach to win three state baseball championships (1957, 1965, 1978). He won 411 games and 12 league titles in 31 seasons coaching the Farmington Indians, holding a losing record only once.

Pinsky coached Dick McAuliffe, who played with the Detroit Tigers.

Pinsky was named the outstanding coach for the year 1965 by the Connecticut High School Coaches Association after winning his second state title that year. In 1986, Pinsky was named to the Hall of Fame for Greater Hartford Jewish Athletes. In 1988 he received the Baseball Coach Gold Award from Scholastic Coach Magazine, and in 1989 he was inducted into the Connecticut High School Coaches Association's Hall of Fame.

In 2003 he was unanimously voted to receive the Red O'Neill Award from the University of Connecticut, citing his character, leadership, athletic ability and successful career. Also in 2003 he was inducted into the Hartford Public High School Sports Hall of Fame.

Pinsky was a three-sport athlete at Hartford High School (C '44) and played both baseball and football at the University of Connecticut (C '50). In five years he never had a punt blocked. Until recently Leo, along with his brothers Jules, David, and Albert held a national collegiate record for the most football letters by a single family (13 from 1933 to 1949).

Pinsky was drafted into the United States Marine Corps in the fall of his freshman year of college. He went through basic training at Parris Island and also trained at Camp Lejeune under the legendary Marine officer Lewis "Chesty" Puller. Pinsky later served on the South Pacific island of Guam where he played baseball and famously hit two grand slams in an 8-7 win over the Navy.
