= 1968 New York Yankees season =

Season for the Major League Baseball team the New York Yankees

1968 New York Yankees
- League: American League
- Ballpark: Yankee Stadium
- City: New York City
- Record: 83–75 (.525)
- League place: 5th
- Owners: CBS
- General managers: Lee MacPhail
- Managers: Ralph Houk
- Television: WPIX (Phil Rizzuto, Jerry Coleman, Frank Messer)
- Radio: WHN (Frank Messer, Phil Rizzuto, Jerry Coleman)

The 1968 New York Yankees season was the 66th season for the team. The team finished above .500 for the first time since 1964, with a record of 83–79, finishing 20 games behind the Detroit Tigers. New York was managed by Ralph Houk. The Yankees played at Yankee Stadium. The 1968 season was notable for being Mickey Mantle's final season before he announced his retirement the following spring. The Yankees batted .214 as a team, the lowest total ever for a team in a full season in the live-ball era (as of 2025).

== Offseason ==
- November 28, 1967: Andy Kosco was drafted by the Yankees from the Oakland Athletics in the 1967 rule 5 draft.
- November 30, 1967: Gene Michael was purchased by the Yankees from the Los Angeles Dodgers.
- December 7, 1967: Bob Tillman and Dale Roberts were traded by the Yankees to the Atlanta Braves for Bobby Cox.
- Prior to 1968 season: Merritt Ranew was acquired by the Yankees from the California Angels.

== Regular season ==
In 1968, Yankees executive E. Michael Burke was a candidate to become Commissioner of Baseball. Bowie Kuhn would eventually get the appointment.

=== Season standings ===
American League
Team	W	L	Pct.	GB	Home	Road
Detroit Tigers	103	59	.636	—	56‍–‍25	47‍–‍34
Baltimore Orioles	91	71	.562	12	47‍–‍33	44‍–‍38
Cleveland Indians	86	75	.534	16½	43‍–‍37	43‍–‍38
Boston Red Sox	86	76	.531	17	46‍–‍35	40‍–‍41
New York Yankees	83	79	.512	20	39‍–‍42	44‍–‍37
Oakland Athletics	82	80	.506	21	44‍–‍38	38‍–‍42
Minnesota Twins	79	83	.488	24	41‍–‍40	38‍–‍43
California Angels	67	95	.414	36	32‍–‍49	35‍–‍46
Chicago White Sox	67	95	.414	36	36‍–‍45	31‍–‍50
Washington Senators	65	96	.404	37½	34‍–‍47	31‍–‍49

=== Record vs. opponents ===
1968 American League record Sources:
Team	BAL	BOS	CAL	CWS	CLE	DET	MIN	NYY	OAK	WAS
Baltimore	—	9–9	10–8	11–7	7–11	8–10	10–8	13–5	9–9	14–4
Boston	9–9	—	9–9	14–4	10–8	6–12	9–9	10–8	8–10	11–7
California	8–10	9–9	—	8–10	7–11	5–13	7–11	6–12	5–13	12–6
Chicago	7–11	4–14	10–8	—	5–13	5–13	10–8	6–12	10–8	10–8
Cleveland	11–7	8–10	11–7	13–5	—	6–12	14–4	10–8–1	6–12	7–10
Detroit	10–8	12–6	13–5	13–5	12–6	—	10–8	10–8–1	13–5–1	10–8
Minnesota	8–10	9–9	11–7	8–10	4–14	8–10	—	12–6	8–10	11–7
New York	5–13	8–10	12–6	12–6	8–10–1	8–10–1	6–12	—	10–8	14–4
Oakland	9–9	10–8	13–5	8–10	12–6	5–13–1	10–8	8–10	—	7–11
Washington	4–14	7–11	6–12	8–10	10–7	8–10	7–11	4–14	11–7	—

=== Notable transactions ===
- June 7, 1968: 1968 Major League Baseball draft
  - Thurman Munson was drafted by the Yankees in the 1st round (4th pick).
  - Wayne Nordhagen was drafted by the Yankees in the 7th round.
- July 15, 1968: Rocky Colavito was signed as a free agent by the Yankees.
- September 30, 1968: Rocky Colavito was released by the Yankees.

=== Roster ===
1968 New York Yankees
Roster
Pitchers: 45 Stan Bahnsen; 18 Steve Barber; 56 Jim Bouton; 56 John Cumberland; 24 Al Downing; 39 Steve Hamilton; 40 Lindy McDaniel; 40 Bill Monbouquette; 19 Fritz Peterson; 30 Mel Stottlemyre; 22 Fred Talbot; 54 Thad Tillotson; 52 Joe Verbanic; 58 Dooley Womack; 51 John Wyatt	Catchers: 38 Frank Fernández; 41 Jake Gibbs; 23 Ellie Rodríguez; Infielders: 12 Rubén Amaro; 20 Horace Clarke; 14 Bobby Cox; 26 Mike Ferraro; 10 Dick Howser; 7 Mickey Mantle; 17 Gene Michael; 6 Charley Smith; 51 Tony Solaita; 15 Tom Tresh	Outfielders: 29 Rocky Colavito; 28 Andy Kosco; 25 Joe Pepitone; 11 Bill Robinson; 9 Steve Whitaker; 21,48 Roy White	Manager: 35 Ralph Houk; Coaches: 2 Frankie Crosetti; 16 Whitey Ford; 44 Jim Hegan; 55 Spud Murray; 31 Jim Turner

== Player stats ==
= Indicates team leader

=== Batting ===
==== Starters by position ====
Note: Pos = Position; G = Games played; AB = At bats; R= Runs; H = Hits; Avg. = Batting average; HR = Home runs; RBI = Runs batted in; SB = Stolen bases

Pos	Player	G	AB	R	H	Avg.	HR	RBI	SB
C	Jake Gibbs	124	423	31	90	.213	3	29	9
1B	Mickey Mantle	144	435	57	103	.237	18	54	6
2B	Horace Clarke	148	579	52	133	.230	2	26	20
3B	Bobby Cox	135	437	33	100	.229	7	41	3
SS	Tom Tresh	152	507	60	99	.195	11	52	10
LF	Roy White	159	577	89	154	.267	17	62	20
CF	Joe Pepitone	108	380	41	93	.245	15	56	8
RF	Andy Kosco	131	466	47	112	.240	15	59	2

==== Other batters ====
Note: G = Games played; AB = At bats; R= Runs; H = Hits; Avg. = Batting average; HR = Home runs; RBI = Runs batted in; SB = Stolen bases

Player	G	AB	R	H	Avg.	HR	RBI	SB
Bill Robinson	107	342	34	82	.240	6	40	7
Dick Howser	85	150	24	23	.153	0	3	0
Frank Fernández	51	135	15	23	.170	7	30	1
Gene Michael	61	116	8	23	.198	1	8	3
Rocky Colavito	39	91	13	20	.220	5	13	0
Mike Ferraro	23	87	5	14	.161	0	1	0
Charley Smith	46	70	2	16	.229	1	7	0
Steve Whitaker	28	60	3	7	.117	0	3	0
Rubén Amaro	47	41	3	5	.122	0	0	0
Ellie Rodríguez	9	24	1	5	.208	0	1	0
Tony Solaita	1	1	0	0	.000	0	0	0

=== Pitching ===
==== Starting pitchers ====
Note: G = Games pitched; IP = Innings pitched; W = Wins; L = Losses; ERA = Earned run average; SO = Strikeouts

Player	G	IP	W	L	ERA	SO
Mel Stottlemyre	36	278.2	21	12	2.45	140
Stan Bahnsen	37	267.1	17	12	2.05	162
Fritz Peterson	36	212.1	12	11	2.63	115
Steve Barber	20	128.1	6	5	3.23	87
Bill Monbouquette	17	89.1	5	7	4.43	32
Al Downing	15	61.1	3	3	3.52	40

==== Other pitchers ====
Note: G = Games pitched; IP = Innings pitched; W = Wins; L = Losses; ERA = Earned run average; SO = Strikeouts

Player	G	IP	W	L	ERA	SO
Fred Talbot	29	99.0	1	9	3.36	67
Joe Verbanic	40	97.0	6	7	3.15	40
Jim Bouton	12	44.0	1	1	3.68	24

==== Relief pitchers ====
Note: G = Games pitched; W = Wins; L = Losses; SV = Saves; ERA = Earned run average; SO = Strikeouts

Player	G	W	L	SV	ERA	SO
Steve Hamilton	40	2	2	11	2.13	42
Dooley Womack	45	3	7	2	3.21	27
Lindy McDaniel	24	4	1	10	1.75	43
Thad Tillotson	7	1	0	0	4.35	1
John Wyatt	7	0	2	0	2.16	6
Gene Michael	1	0	0	0	0.00	3
Rocky Colavito	1	1	0	0	0.00	1
John Cumberland	1	0	0	0	9.00	1

== Farm system ==
Level	Team	League	Manager
AAA	Syracuse Chiefs	International League	Gary Blaylock and Frank Verdi
AA	Binghamton Triplets	Eastern League	Frank Verdi, Cloyd Boyer and Jim Gleeson
A	Kinston Eagles	Carolina League	Bob Bauer
A	Fort Lauderdale Yankees	Florida State League	Billy Shantz
A-Short Season	Oneonta Yankees	New York–Penn League	Jerry Walker
Rookie	Johnson City Yankees	Appalachian League	Gene Hassell

LEAGUE CHAMPIONS: Oneonta
