= Jon Warden =

American baseball player (born 1946)

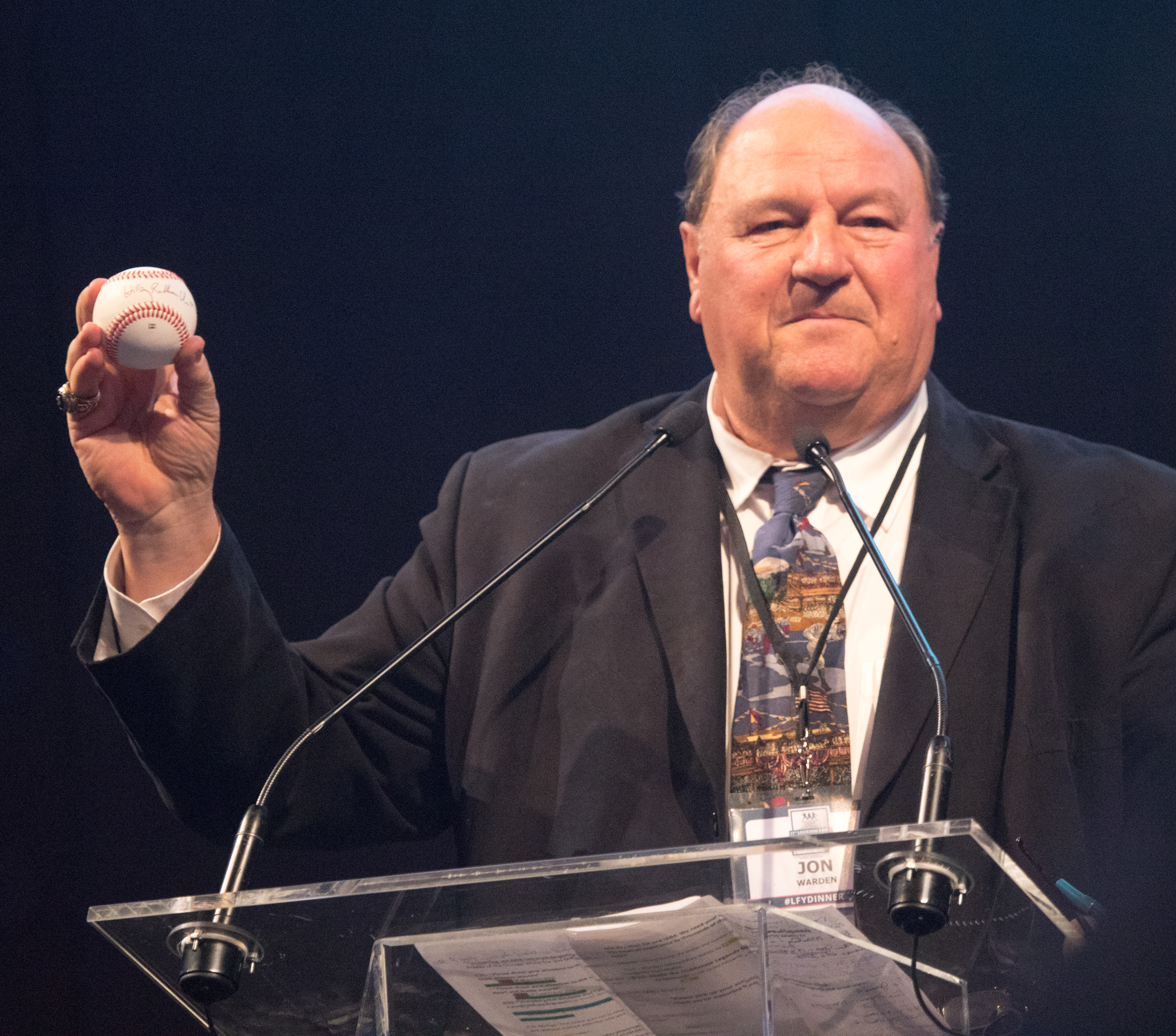
- Warden in 2016
- Pitcher
- Born: October 1, 1946 (age 79); Columbus, Ohio, U.S.
- Batted: Both Threw: Left

MLB debut
- April 11, 1968, for the Detroit Tigers

Last MLB appearance
- September 28, 1968, for the Detroit Tigers

MLB statistics
- Earned run average: 3.62
- Record: 4-1
- Strikeouts: 25
- Stats at Baseball Reference

Teams
- Detroit Tigers (1968)

Jon Warden (born October 1, 1946) is an American baseball player originally from Columbus, Ohio. A left-handed pitcher, he was selected by the Detroit Tigers in the fourth round of the 1966 amateur draft. In the 1968 season, he played 28 games and 37 1/3 innings for the Tigers, ending with a 4-1 record, 3 saves, 11 games finished, and an ERA of 3.62. After the conclusion of the 1968 season, he was selected in the expansion draft by the Kansas City Royals, but did not play any games for that team.
