= Dick McAuliffe =

American baseball player (1939–2016)

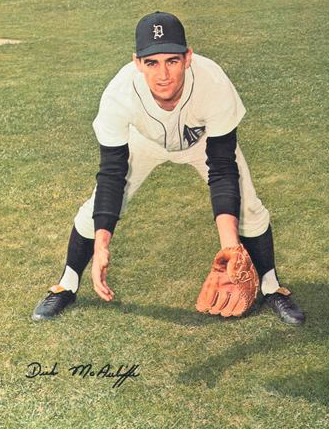
- McAuliffe with the Detroit Tigers in 1966
- Second baseman / Shortstop
- Born: November 29, 1939; Hartford, Connecticut, U.S.
- Died: May 13, 2016 (aged 76); Farmington, Connecticut, U.S.
- Batted: Left Threw: Right

MLB debut
- September 17, 1960, for the Detroit Tigers

Last MLB appearance
- September 1, 1975, for the Boston Red Sox

MLB statistics
- Batting average: .247
- Home runs: 197
- Runs batted in: 697
- Stats at Baseball Reference

Teams
- Detroit Tigers (1960–1973); Boston Red Sox (1974–1975)

Career highlights and awards
- 3× All-Star (1965–1967); World Series champion (1968)

Richard John McAuliffe (November 29, 1939 – May 13, 2016) was an American professional baseball shortstop and second baseman who played in Major League Baseball (MLB) for the Detroit Tigers (1960–73) and Boston Red Sox (1974–75). He was a part of the Tigers' 1968 World Series championship and was known for his unusual batting stance. A left-handed hitter, McAuliffe held his hands very high with an open stance that faced the pitcher. As the pitcher delivered to home plate, he moved his forward (right) foot to a more conventional position before swinging.

== Early years ==
McAuliffe graduated from Farmington High School in Farmington, Connecticut, where he was coached by Leo Pinsky and won the state championship in 1957. McAuliffe signed with the Detroit Tigers as a free agent out of high school and spent three seasons in the Tigers' farm system. In 1960, he led the Sally League in runs (109), triples (21), and shortstop assists (430) while playing for the Knoxville Smokies. He was called up to the big leagues at the end of the 1960 season and made his major league debut on September 17, 1960.

== Detroit Tigers ==
In the 1961 and 1962 seasons, McAuliffe shifted between shortstop and second base before replacing Chico Fernandez as the Tigers starting shortstop from 1963–1966. Known for his wide-open batting stance and leg kick, McAuliffe never hit higher than .274 but was a significant contributor to the Tigers' offensive output in the 1960s. In 1964, he hit a career-high 24 home runs, which led the team. In 1965, he was the American League's starting shortstop in the All-Star Game, and he went 2-for-3 with a home run and two runs batted in. In 1966, he finished the season ranked fourth in the league with a .373 on-base percentage and fifth with a .509 slugging percentage.

After making the American League All-Star team again in 1966 at shortstop, McAuliffe agreed to move to second base in 1967 to make room for Ray Oyler to take over at shortstop. Even with the move, McAuliffe was selected for his third consecutive All-Star team in 1967. The 1967 season was memorable for the tight four-way pennant race between the Tigers, Boston Red Sox, Minnesota Twins, and Chicago White Sox, with all four teams still in contention entering the final week of the season. The Tigers needed to win the final game of the season against the California Angels, to force a one-game playoff with the Red Sox for the American League championship. However, the Tigers lost, finishing one game behind the Red Sox. Along with Al Kaline and Bill Freehan, McAuliffe played an integral role for the Tigers during the 1967 season, finishing among the American League leaders in walks with 105 (3rd), 245 times on base (3rd), 7 triples (3rd), 92 runs (5th), 118 strikeouts (5th), 22 home runs (8th), and a .364 on-base percentage (9th).

McAuliffe played a key role in the Tigers' 1968 World Championship season. He had a .344 on-base percentage, led the American League with 95 runs scored, and showed power with 50 extra base hits. He also tied a major league record by going the entire 1968 season without grounding into a double play and was the first American League player to do so. McAuliffe also improved defensively in 1968, reducing his error total from 28 in 1967 to 9 in 1968 and finished second among American League second basemen in fielding percentage. He finished seventh in the American League Most Valuable Player Award voting, behind teammates Denny McLain (1st), Bill Freehan (2nd), and Willie Horton (4th).

On August 22, McAuliffe was involved in a brawl with Chicago White Sox pitcher Tommy John. After one pitch barely missed McAuliffe's head and another was thrown behind him, McAuliffe charged the mound, drove his knee into John's shoulder and separated it. John was out for the season, and McAuliffe was suspended for five games. Interviewed 30 years later, McAuliffe was still convinced John was throwing at his head: "The first pitch at me was right at my head, and I mean right at my head. The catcher never laid any leather on it, and it hit the backstop. The next pitch, he spun me down, threw it behind me." White Sox general manager Ed Short took a different view, pointing out the pitch before the fight came on a 3–2 count, resulting in a runner reaching base.

In the 1968 World Series, McAuliffe played all seven games at second base, scored 5 runs, and 6 hits, 4 walks, 3 runs batted in, and one home run. His steadying influence in the middle infield helped make it possible for manager Mayo Smith to take the radical step of playing center fielder Mickey Stanley at shortstop in the World Series in order to get a better bat in the lineup against the St. Louis Cardinals, led by Bob Gibson.

McAuliffe continued as the Tigers' starting second baseman through the 1973 season.

== Boston Red Sox ==
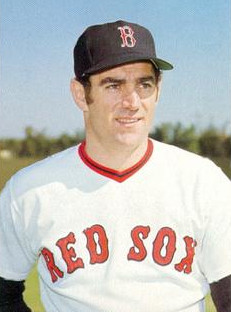
McAuliffe in 1974

McAullife was traded by the Tigers to the Boston Red Sox for Ben Oglivie on October 23, 1973. McAuliffe hit .210 in 100 games for the Red Sox in 1974. He began 1975 as the manager of Boston's Double-A farm team, the Bristol Red Sox, located in McAuliffe's home state of Connecticut. He guided Bristol into first place in the Eastern League but was recalled to Boston in August to resume his playing career as a utility infielder. However, McAuliffe was released after playing seven more games. His career ended on September 1, 1975, in a Yankees–Red Sox game. McAuliffe dropped an easy popup for an error. Later in the inning, McAuliffe's throw pulled Carl Yastrzemski off first base. Though the play was scored a single, Boston fans booed McAuliffe. He was left off Boston's postseason roster, and his major league career was over.

== Career statistics ==
Seasons	G	PA	AB	R	H	2B	3B	HR	RBI	SB	BB	K	BA	OBP	SLG	Fld%
16	1763	7161	6185	888	1530	231	71	197	696	63	882	974	.247	.343	.403	.966

McAuliffe was among the American League leaders in triples eight times, and his ability to draw walks also increased his offensive output, ending his career with a .343 on-base percentage. Bill James ranked McAuliffe 22nd all-time among second baseman in his New Historical Baseball Abstract.

== Post-baseball career ==
After retiring from baseball, McAuliffe owned a business that repaired and installed coin-operated washing machines and dryers for ten years and also ran baseball schools. McAuliffe also played professional softball for the New England Pilgrims of the American Professional Slo-Pitch League (APSPL) in their 1979 season.

== Death ==
After a battle with Alzheimer's disease, McAuliffe died on May 13, 2016, at the age of 76, after suffering a stroke.

== See also ==
- List of Major League Baseball annual runs scored leaders
