= Tom Matchick =

American baseball player (1943–2022)

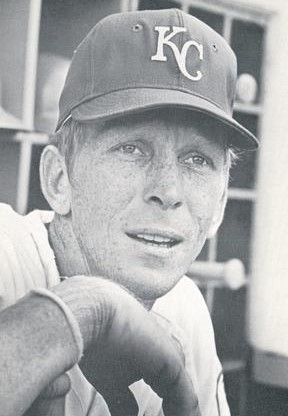
- Matchick in 1970
- Infielder
- Born: September 7, 1943; Hazleton, Pennsylvania, U.S.
- Died: January 4, 2022 (aged 78); Sylvania, Ohio, U.S.
- Batted: Left Threw: Right

MLB debut
- September 2, 1967, for the Detroit Tigers

Last MLB appearance
- October 3, 1972, for the Baltimore Orioles

MLB statistics
- Batting average: .215
- Home runs: 4
- Runs batted in: 64
- Stats at Baseball Reference

Teams
- Detroit Tigers (1967–1969); Boston Red Sox (1970); Kansas City Royals (1970); Milwaukee Brewers (1971); Baltimore Orioles (1972)

Career highlights and awards
- World Series champion (1968)

John Thomas Matchick (September 7, 1943 – January 4, 2022) was an American professional baseball infielder who played six seasons in Major League Baseball (MLB). He played for the Detroit Tigers, Boston Red Sox, Kansas City Royals, Milwaukee Brewers, and Baltimore Orioles from 1967 to 1972. He compiled a .215 batting average with four home runs and 64 runs batted in 292 major league games. He was also named the top all-star in the International League on four occasions.

Matchick appeared in 80 games for the Detroit Tigers team that won the World Series in 1968. The UPI wrote in July 1968 that his two-run walk-off home run against the Baltimore Orioles "looms as the biggest blow so far in the 1968 pennant races" and called him the Tigers' most unlikely hero since Floyd Giebell in 1940.

== Early life ==
Matchick was born on September 7, 1943, in Hazleton, Pennsylvania. His father, John Wesley Matchick, was a crane operator for Bethlehem Steel Corporation. He attended Hazleton-Freeland High School where he played football. Matchick did not play baseball in high school but was discovered playing Junior American Legion baseball.

== Professional career ==
=== St. Louis Cardinals ===
In 1962, Matchick was signed by scout Ollie Vanek to a contract with the St. Louis Cardinals and received a $17,000 signing bonus. He began his professional career with the Brunswick Cardinals in Brunswick, Georgia. He appeared in 71 games for Brunswick and compiled a .311 batting average and a .372 on-base percentage. He finished the 1962 season with the Winnipeg Goldeyes of the Northern League.

=== Detroit Tigers ===
==== Minor leagues ====
In November 1962, Matchick was drafted by the Detroit Tigers from the Cardinals in the 1962 first-year draft. He spent five years in the Tigers' farm system before making his debut with the Tigers. In the spring of 1963, his first with the Tigers organization, Matchick was assigned to the Lakeland Tigers where he was described as a "flashy fielder" who had good range and a powerful throwing arm.

Matchick next played for the Knoxville Smokies in 1963 and 1964. By the end of the 1964 season, Matchick had been promoted to the Syracuse Chiefs, the Tigers' Triple-A team in the International League. He spent the 1965 and 1966 seasons in Syracuse, appearing in 277 games and accumulating 41 doubles, 10 triples, 19 home runs, and 115 RBIs.

==== 1967 season ====
Prior to the 1967 season, the Tigers swapped Triple-A farm teams with the New York Yankees, resulting in Matchick's move to the Toledo Mud Hens. During the 1967 season, Matchick appeared in 120 games for the Mud Hens, compiling a .289 batting average and a .329 on-base percentage with 38 extra base hits, 11 home runs, and 55 RBIs. Matchick was a Triple A all-star and won a Rawlings Silver Glove Award (the minor league equivalent to the Rawlings Gold Glove Award) for his fielding during the 1967 season.

Matchick was called up by the Tigers late in the 1967 season. He made his Major League Baseball debut with the Tigers on September 2, 1967. He appeared in eight games at the end of the 1967 season, tallying one hit and one run in six at bats.

==== 1968 season ====
In 1968, Matchick appeared in 80 games for the Detroit Tigers team that won the 1968 World Series. While Matchick hit only four home runs in his entire major league career, three of them were hit in 1968. He compiled a .203 batting average with 14 RBIs in 227 at bats.

On July 19, 1968, Matchick hit a walk-off home run against the Baltimore Orioles to give the Tigers a 5–4 victory. The home run came with two outs in the bottom of the ninth inning, a full count, Bill Freehan on first base, Moe Drabowsky pitching, and the Tigers trailing, 4–3. Matchick was greeted at home plate by the entire Tigers team as a capacity crowd of 53,208 "roared its approval." At the time, the UPI referred to Matchick as the Tigers' most unlikely hero since Floyd Giebell (who pitched the pennant-clinching game for the 1940 Tigers in just his third major league start), and wrote that Tommy's walk-off home run "looms as the biggest blow so far in the 1968 pennant races and could be the blow the Tigers look back on as the one that put them 'home free'."

Matchick also participated in a triple play for the Tigers on September 1, 1968. Detroit pitcher Denny McLain caught a line drive off the bat of Baltimore slugger Boog Powell, threw to Matchick who forced out Curt Blefary at second, and Matchick completed the play by throwing to Norm Cash who forced out Frank Robinson at first base. McLain recorded his 27th win of the season in the game. The play was the Tigers' first triple play since 1965.

==== 1969 season ====
During the 1969 MLB season, Matchick played at all four infield positions for the Tigers, appearing in 94 games, and compiling a .242 batting average with 32 RBIs. In 16 pinch hit appearances in 1969, he had eight hits for a .500 batting average as a pinch hitter.

=== Boston Red Sox ===
In December 1969, the Tigers traded Matchick to the Boston Red Sox for infielder Dalton Jones. Matchick appeared in only 10 games for the Red Sox during the first month of the 1969 season. He had one hit and two bases on balls and scored two runs in 16 plate appearances.

=== Kansas City Royals ===
In May 1970, the Red Sox traded Matchick to the Kansas City Royals in exchange for first baseman Mike Fiore. Matchick appeared in 55 games for the Royals, including 37 as the team's starting shortstop and five as the starting second baseman. He compiled a .196 batting average in 158 at bats with the 1970 Royals.

=== Milwaukee Brewers ===
In May 1971, Matchick was traded by the Royals to the Milwaukee Brewers in exchange for outfielder Ted Savage. He was assigned by the Brewers to their Evansville farm club where he played at third base, shortstop, and second base, and compiled a .332 batting average in 85 games. He was called up by the Brewers in late July 1971. He appeared in 42 games for the Brewers, including 32 games as the team's starting third baseman. He compiled a .219 batting average and a .254 on-base percentage in 122 plate appearances with the Brewers.

=== Baltimore Orioles ===
On October 22, 1971, the Brewers traded Matchick and Bruce Look to the Baltimore Orioles in exchange for Mike Ferraro and a prospect. Matchick spent most of the 1972 season with the Orioles' Rochester Red Wings farm club in the International League. He appeared in 126 games with the Red Wings, primarily at third base, committed only four errors, and compiled a .251 batting average with 11 home runs and 60 RBIs. He received an award as the top third baseman in the minor leagues in 1972.

In September 1972, the Orioles called up Matchick from their Rochester farm club. He appeared in only three games for the Orioles, totalling two hits in nine at bats. His final Major League game was on October 3, 1972, as a member of the Orioles.

=== New York Yankees ===
In March 1973, the Orioles traded Matchick to the New York Yankees in exchange for infielder Frank Baker. Matchick was assigned by the Yankees to the Syracuse Chiefs in the International League where he appeared in 87 games, compiling a .271 batting average and .341 on-base percentage. Matchick remained active in the minor leagues through the 1976 season.

== Personal life and death ==
Matchick married Linda Lang, a native of Toledo, Ohio. They had a son, Brian Thomas Matchick, on February 5, 1969. They had a daughter, Heather, the following year. Matchick and his wife settled in Holland, Ohio, where they served as foster parents to more than 30 children. Matchick worked over the years as a car salesman, in the sporting goods business, and later as an executive with Great Lakes Aerocam, an aerial photography business in Woodville, Ohio.

Matchick died at Regency Hospital of Toledo, on January 4, 2022, after a two month battle with COVID-19. He was 78 years old.
