= Dennis Saunders =

American baseball player (born 1949)

- Pitcher
- Born: January 4, 1949 (age 77); Alhambra, California, U.S.
- Batted: Right Threw: Right

MLB debut
- May 21, 1970, for the Detroit Tigers

Last MLB appearance
- June 12, 1970, for the Detroit Tigers

MLB statistics
- Win–loss record: 1–1
- Earned run average: 3.21
- Innings: 14
- Stats at Baseball Reference

Teams
- Detroit Tigers (1970)

Dennis James Saunders (born January 4, 1949) is an American former professional baseball player, a right-handed pitcher who worked in eight Major League games for the 1970 Detroit Tigers, strictly in relief. He stood 6 feet 3 inches (1.91 m) tall and weighed 195 pounds (88 kg) as an active player.

Saunders allowed 16 hits, five bases on balls and one home run — with eight strikeouts — in 14 innings pitched for Detroit. In his finest performance, his second Major League game on May 24, he relieved starter Mickey Lolich in the third inning and hurled 5 2/3 innings of scoreless ball, allowing only three hits, against the Washington Senators. He earned his only Major League save (on May 29) and victory (on June 10) against the Milwaukee Brewers.

His professional career concluded after the 1972 season, his sixth year in minor league baseball, where he appeared in 142 games, 63 as a starting pitcher.
