= John Wyatt (baseball) =

American baseball player (1934–1998)

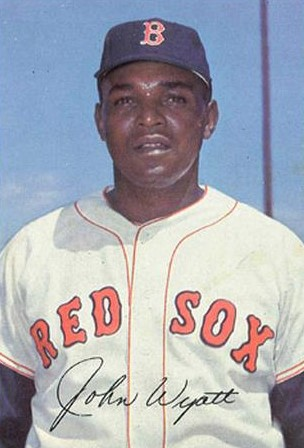
- Pitcher
- Born: April 19, 1934; Chicago, Illinois, U.S.
- Died: April 6, 1998 (aged 63); Omaha, Nebraska, U.S.
- Batted: Right Threw: Right

MLB debut
- September 8, 1961, for the Kansas City Athletics

Last MLB appearance
- May 1, 1969, for the Oakland Athletics

MLB statistics
- Win–loss record: 42–44
- Earned run average: 3.47
- Strikeouts: 540
- Saves: 103
- Stats at Baseball Reference

Teams
- Kansas City Athletics (1961–1966); Boston Red Sox (1966–1968); New York Yankees (1968); Detroit Tigers (1968); Oakland Athletics (1969)

Career highlights and awards
- All-Star (1964)

John Thomas Wyatt (April 19, 1934 – April 6, 1998) was an American professional baseball pitcher. He played all or part of nine seasons in Major League Baseball (MLB), primarily as a relief pitcher. From 1961 through 1969, he played for the Kansas City Athletics (1961–66), Boston Red Sox (1966–68), New York Yankees (1968), Detroit Tigers (1968) and Oakland Athletics (1969). In the Negro leagues, he played for the Indianapolis Clowns (1953–55). Wyatt batted and threw right-handed.

== Life and career ==
Wyatt was born in Chicago, Illinois, a son of Claudette (née Watkins) and John Wyatt Sr. He grew up in Buffalo, New York, where he attended Fosdick-Masten Park High School.

His contract was sold to the Tigers from the Yankees on June 15, 1968.

In his major league career, Wyatt posted a 42–44 record with a 3.72 ERA and 103 saves in 435 games pitched. He was selected to the 1964 American League All-Star Team, and pitched for the Red Sox in the 1967 World Series, as the winning pitcher in Game Six.

Wyatt died from a heart attack in Omaha, Nebraska, at the age of 63.
