= Dennis Ribant =

American baseball player (1941–2023)

- Pitcher
- Born: September 20, 1941; Detroit, Michigan, U.S.
- Died: April 24, 2023 (aged 81); Newport Beach, California, U.S.
- Batted: Right Threw: Right

MLB debut
- August 9, 1964, for the New York Mets

Last MLB appearance
- September 27, 1969, for the Cincinnati Reds

MLB statistics
- Win–loss record: 24–29
- Earned run average: 3.87
- Strikeouts: 241
- Stats at Baseball Reference

Teams
- New York Mets (1964–1966); Pittsburgh Pirates (1967); Detroit Tigers (1968); Chicago White Sox (1968); St. Louis Cardinals (1969); Cincinnati Reds (1969)

Dennis Joseph Ribant (/ˈraɪbænt/ RY-bant; September 20, 1941 – April 24, 2023) was an American pitcher in Major League Baseball who played for the New York Mets, Pittsburgh Pirates, Detroit Tigers, Chicago White Sox, St. Louis Cardinals, and Cincinnati Reds. He was traded by the Pirates to the Tigers for Dave Wickersham on November 28, 1967.

Ribant died in Newport Beach, California, on April 24, 2023, at the age of 81.
