= Bob Christian (baseball) =

American baseball player (1945–1974)

- Left fielder
- Born: October 17, 1945; Chicago, Illinois, U.S.
- Died: February 20, 1974 (aged 28); San Diego, California, U.S.
- Batted: Right Threw: Right

MLB debut
- September 2, 1968, for the Detroit Tigers

Last MLB appearance
- May 24, 1970, for the Chicago White Sox

MLB statistics
- Batting average: .224
- Home runs: 4
- Runs batted in: 19
- Stats at Baseball Reference

Teams
- Detroit Tigers (1968); Chicago White Sox (1969–1970)

Robert Charles Christian (October 17, 1945 – February 20, 1974) was an American professional baseball player who played seven seasons (1964–1970) in North America — including parts of three seasons in the Major Leagues with the Detroit Tigers and Chicago White Sox — and two more years (1971–1972) in Japan. A third baseman and outfielder, he threw and batted right-handed, stood 5 feet 10 inches (1.78 m) tall and weighed 180 pounds (82 kg).

Christian was born in Chicago, but his family moved to El Cajon, California, when he was a boy. After attending El Cajon Valley High School and Grossmont College, he signed his first baseball contract with the New York Yankees before the 1964 season. But Christian spent only one season in the Yankee farm system, with the Rookie-level Johnson City Yankees, before he was selected by Detroit in the first-year player draft, and he would play the next four seasons in the Tiger organization.

After collecting a career-high 151 hits and batting .319 for the 1968 Toledo Mud Hens, Christian was recalled for his first taste of Major League action after the September 1 roster expansion. The Tigers were breezing to an American League pennant and, ultimately, the 1968 World Series championship, and used Christian in three games as an outfielder, first baseman and pinch hitter. In his second MLB game, he collected his first Major League hit, a double off Camilo Pascual of the Washington Senators. Those three games constituted Christian's entire Tiger career; on September 30, he was sent to the White Sox as part payment for relief pitcher Don McMahon, who had been acquired by Detroit on July 26.

Christian then spent parts of the 1969–1970 seasons with the MLB White Sox (and the remainder with the Triple-A Tucson Toros). He appeared in 39 games played and recorded 143 plate appearances with the 1969 ChiSox, batting .217. Called up in June, he hit his first Major League home run on June 14 against a future Baseball Hall of Fame pitcher, Jim Palmer, and was Chicago's starting left fielder for much of September. He began 1970 with the White Sox and stayed with the club into May as a pinch hitter and occasional left fielder. On May 20, his ninth-inning, two-run pinch home run against the California Angels' Tom Murphy was a key hit in a game-winning rally, as Chicago scored three times in the final frame to win, 3–2, at Comiskey Park. Christian spent most of that season with Tucson, batting .335 before drawing his release to play in Japan.

All told, he collected 33 hits during a 54-game Major League tenure, including four home runs and five doubles. In two seasons (1971–1972) with the Toei Flyers of the Japan Pacific League, he appeared in 232 games and collected 199 hits, with 25 doubles, two triples, 27 homers and 90 runs batted in, batting .263.

However, illness curtailed both his playing career and his life. Diagnosed with leukemia, Christian died in San Diego, California, at the age of 28. He was survived by his wife and two children.
