= Mickey Stanley =

American baseball player (born 1942)

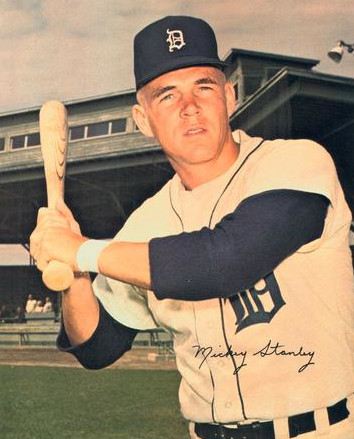
- Center fielder
- Born: July 20, 1942 (age 83); Grand Rapids, Michigan, U.S.
- Batted: Right Threw: Right

MLB debut
- September 13, 1964, for the Detroit Tigers

Last MLB appearance
- September 28, 1978, for the Detroit Tigers

MLB statistics
- Batting average: .248
- Home runs: 117
- Runs batted in: 500
- Stats at Baseball Reference

Teams
- Detroit Tigers (1964–1978)

Career highlights and awards
- 4× Gold Glove Award (1968–1970, 1973); World Series champion (1968)

Mitchell Jack "Mickey" Stanley (born July 20, 1942) is an American former professional baseball player.

A native of Grand Rapids, Michigan, Stanley signed with the Detroit Tigers organization in 1960. After four years in the Tigers' minor league organization, he made his major league debut in September 1964. He remained with the Tigers for 15 years from 1964 to 1978. He appeared in 1,516 games with the Tigers, 1,175 of them as a center fielder. He won four American League Gold Glove Awards (1968, 1969, 1970, and 1973) and ranked among baseball's all-time leaders in career fielding percentage by an outfielder.

While generally a center fielder, when it came time for the games leading up to the 1968 World Series, Detroit manager Mayo Smith moved Stanley to shortstop, which ultimately paid off in a world championship.

After retiring from baseball, Stanley became a builder and real estate developer in Livingston County, Michigan. He was inducted into the Michigan Sports Hall of Fame in 1994 and the Grand Rapids Sports Hall of Fame in 1996.

== Early life ==
Stanley was born in Grand Rapids, Michigan, in 1942. His father, James, drove a truck at night for the Oven Fresh Bakery. He attended Ottawa Hills High School in Grand Rapids where he played baseball, basketball, and football. He played in the infield and pitched for Ottawa Hills. He led the Grand Rapids city league with a .524 batting average in 1959, and compiled a .373 batting average as a senior in 1960. In football, he played at the halfback and end positions.

== Professional baseball ==
=== Minor leagues ===
In June 1960, Stanley signed for a reported $12,000 to play for the Detroit Tigers organization during the 1961 season.

Stanley spent four years in the Tigers' minor league organization. In 1962, he played for the Duluth Dukes in the outfield with Jim Northrup and Willie Horton—a trio that later played together in Detroit for more than a decade. Stanley's speed and fielding talents impressed, but his failure to hit for average delayed his progress to the big league roster. He hit .252 with the Knoxville Smokies at Double-A level in 1963. He began the 1964 with the Triple-A Syracuse Chiefs, but he hit only .160 in 19 games and was sent back to Knoxville 50 at bats with Syracuse where he hit a career high .304 in 90 games.

In mid-September 1964, Stanley was called up by the Tigers, making his major league debut on September 13, playing in left field in place of Gates Brown. At the time, Al Kaline called Stanley "the best young outfielder we have had in the minors since I started here." Stanley appeared in four major league games in 1964, compiling a .273 batting average in 11 at bats.

Stanley returned to the minors in 1965. He appeared in 144 games at Syracuse and compiled .281 batting average with 10 home runs and 73 RBIs. He was also named to the International League all-star team and led the league's outfielders with a .992 fielding percentage.

=== 1965–1967 ===
In late August 1965, Stanley returned to Tigers—this time to stay. He appeared in 30 games, 29 of them in center field, with a .239 batting average and hit his first major league home run on September 3, 1965.

In 1966, Stanley made the big league roster and began the season as the team's starting center fielder. In mid-May, he broke a bone in his left little finger when he fell at his home after washing his car. He returned to the lineup in mid-June and appeared in a total of 92 games, 82 in center field. He ended up leading the team with a .289 batting average and finished the season with a perfect 1.000 fielding percentage in 174 chances in center field. Stanley credited his improved batting in 1966 to acting manager Frank Skaff giving him more playing time in the second half of the season and boosting his confidence.

In 1967, the Tigers were in the running for the American League pennant, ultimately finishing one game behind the Boston Red Sox. Stanley appeared in 145 games, 129 in center field. However, his batting average plummeted by 79 points to .210, just three points higher than shortstop Ray Oyler.

=== 1968 season ===
During the Tigers' 1968 season, Stanley helped the team win the American League pennant with a 103–59 record. He appeared in 153 games, including 131 in center field, 15 at first base, nine at shortstop, and one inning at second base. He compiled a perfect 1.000 fielding percentage in center field and won his first American League Glove Award. At the plate, he posted a .259 batting average with 11 home runs and 60 RBIs.

Late in the 1968 season, manager Mayo Smith moved Stanley to shortstop, a position Stanley had never played professionally, not even in the minor leagues. His debut at short came on August 23 in Yankee Stadium, moving from center to shortstop in the seventh inning of the first game of a doubleheader, then starting at short in the second game. Stanley would again start at shortstop in six of the last nine games of the season in preparation for the 1968 World Series, replacing regular shortstop Ray Oyler, who hit just .135 that year. The move allowed Smith to play all three of his power-hitting Tiger outfielders (Willie Horton, Jim Northrup, and Al Kaline) for every game of the World Series. Despite his inexperience at shortstop, Stanley played the position adequately, committing only two errors in 34 chances with neither miscue leading to a run. As the starting shortstop for the entire 1968 World Series, Stanley hit a modest .214 in the Fall Classic, but did notch a triple and scored twice in a pivotal Game 5 comeback win for the Tigers. ESPN.com has ranked Smith's decision to move Stanley to shortstop as the third or fourth "gutsiest call" in sports history, and one of the Ten Greatest Coaching Decisions of the 20th Century in any sport. The Boston Globe rated it as "the gutsiest move in history."

=== 1969–1974 ===
In 1969, Mayo Smith continued his experiment playing Stanley at shortstop. That year, Stanley played 58 games at shortstop. However, Stanley's batting average dropped precipitously while playing at shortstop, and he returned to center field for 99 games. His batting average recovered when he was returned to center field, and he finished the 1969 season with a .235 batting average, 16 home runs, and a career-high 70 RBIs. Stanley also won his second Gold Glove Award in 1969 after compiling a .985 fielding percentage in 101 games in the outfield.

From 1970 to 1974, Stanley remained a mainstay in center field for Detroit. His excellent defensive play won him a third Gold Glove Award in 1970. That year, he appeared in 132 games in center field with a perfect 1.000 fielding percentage in 331 chances. He hit .252 with 13 home runs and 47 RBIs and ranked second in the American League with 11 triples.

During the 1971 season, Stanley hit for a career-high .292 batting average, second only to Al Kaline among the Tigers' starters. He remained a fixture in center field for the 1971 Tigers, appearing in 139 games at the position with a .983 fielding percentage.

In 1972, Stanley helped lead the Tigers to the American League East divisional title. He appeared in 139 games in center field and compiled a .987 fielding percentage. His batting average dropped to .234 with 14 home runs and 55 RBIs.

Stanley had one of his best all-around seasons in 1973. He appeared in a career-high 157 games, including 151 games as the team's starting center fielder. He compiled a .993 fielding percentage, a 2.74 range factor (well above the league average of 2.02), and won his fourth Gold Glove Award. He hit a career-high 17 home runs during the 1973 season. After being struck out by Nolan Ryan in a 1973 no-hitter, Stanley told reporters: "Those were the best pitches I ever heard."

In 1974, Stanley played 90 games at center field and compiled a .986 fielding percentage. However, his batting average dropped to .221, the lowest by Stanley since 1967. On July 30, 1974, Stanley broke a bone in his right hand, making room for Ron LeFlore to take over as the Tigers' center fielder. As LeFlore performed well, Stanley conceded in late August, "It's going to be pretty hard to move him out. He's an exciting player."

=== 1975–1978 ===
With LeFlore taking over in center field, Stanley in February 1975 said, "For the first time I feel like I'm on the outside looking in", while adding, "I want to stay in Detroit. I want to stay in Michigan. This is my home and this is where I want to play." He became a utility player and late-inning defense replacement during the 1975 season, appearing in 15 games in center field, 14 in left field, 14 at first base, seven at third base, and one as the team's designated hitter.

He continued in the utility role through the 1978 season, playing at least two games at every position except pitcher and catcher. By April 1977, Stanley and John Hiller were the only two players remaining on the roster from the 1968 World Series championship team. At the end of the 1978 season, Stanley's contract with the Tigers expired, though Stanley expressed his desire to continue playing.

During the 1978 season, Stanley was a bridge between the Tigers 1968 and 1984 World Series teams. Having been a mainstay on the 1968 team, he was an aging veteran playing alongside rookies Alan Trammell, Lou Whitaker, Lance Parrish, and Jack Morris. He was released by the Tigers in December 1978.

=== Career statistics ===
In 15 major league seasons, all with the Tigers, Stanley appeared in 1,516 games, including 1,175 in center field, 94 at first base, 79 in right field, 74 at shortstop, 42 in left field, 18 at third base, five as designated hitter, and four at second base.

He posted a .248 career batting average (1,243-for-5,022) with 641 runs, 201 doubles, 48 triples, 117 home runs, 500 RBIs, 44 stolen bases, 371 bases on balls, .298 on-base percentage and .377 slugging percentage.

Stanley's greatest talents were on defense. He finished his career with four Gold Glove Awards and a .991 fielding percentage as an outfielder. As of 2006, he ranked 12th all-time in fielding percentage by outfielders

== Family and later years ==
Stanley married his high school girlfriend, Ellen Ann Terrell, in 1961. They had three children: Steven Scott, born 1963; Karen Michele, born 1966; and Pamela Ann, born 1970.

After being released by the Tigers, Stanley played two seasons of professional softball, for the Detroit Caesars in 1979 and for the Detroit Auto Kings in 1980.

In 1978, Stanley moved to Green Oak Township in Livingston County, Michigan, and later to Genoa Township in Livingston County. He became a builder and developer. In 2005, he led an effort to build 12,000-square-foot homes on 64 lots covering 28 acres near Howell, Michigan. He also served on the board of directors of Brighton Commerce Bank.

He was inducted into the Michigan Sports Hall of Fame in 1994 and the Grand Rapids Sports Hall of Fame in 1996.

== See also ==
- List of Major League Baseball players who spent their entire career with one franchise
