= Daryl Patterson =

American baseball player (1943–2025)

- Pitcher
- Born: November 21, 1943; Coalinga, California, U.S.
- Died: August 28, 2025 (aged 81); Clovis, California, U.S.
- Batted: Left Threw: Right

MLB debut
- April 10, 1968, for the Detroit Tigers

Last MLB appearance
- September 14, 1974, for the Pittsburgh Pirates

MLB statistics
- Win–loss record: 11–9
- Earned run average: 4.09
- Strikeouts: 142
- Stats at Baseball Reference

Teams
- Detroit Tigers (1968–1971); Oakland Athletics (1971); St. Louis Cardinals (1971); Pittsburgh Pirates (1974)

Career highlights and awards
- World Series champion (1968)

Daryl Alan Patterson (November 21, 1943 – August 28, 2025) was an American right-handed baseball pitcher. He played professional baseball for 12 years from 1965 to 1975, including parts of five seasons in Major League Baseball with the Detroit Tigers (1968–1971), Oakland Athletics (1971), St. Louis Cardinals (1971), and Pittsburgh Pirates (1974).

== Early life ==
Patterson was born in Coalinga, California, on November 21, 1943. He was part Mono, a Native American people from the Sierra Nevada region. He attended College of the Sequoias in Visalia, California, where he played baseball and basketball.

== Professional baseball ==
=== Minor leagues ===
Prior to the 1964 season, Patterson was signed as an amateur free agent by the Los Angeles Dodgers. He spent the 1964 season with the Santa Barbara Dodgers in the California League. He appeared in 22 games and compiled a 1–6 win–loss record with a 6.60 earned run average (ERA) for Santa Barbara.

On November 30, 1964, the Detroit Tigers drafted Patterson in the 1964 first-year draft. He spent the next three years in the Tigers' minor league organization, including stints with the Rocky Mount Leafs (3.30 ERA and 138 strikeouts in 161 innings pitched in 1965), Montgomery Rebels (4.78 ERA and 117 strikeouts in 128 innings pitched in 1966), and Toledo Mud Hens (3.23 ERA and 98 strikeouts in 156 innings pitched in 1967).

=== Detroit Tigers ===
Patterson made his Major League Baseball debut with the Detroit Tigers on April 10, 1968. During the 1968 season, he appeared in 38 games, 37 as a relief pitcher, and compiled a 2.12 ERA, 49 strikeouts, and seven saves in 68 innings pitched. On July 27, 1968, he came into the game with the bases loaded and nobody out, and struck out the side. In the 1968 World Series, he pitched a total of three innings in Games 3 and 4 and did not allow an earned run.

Patterson remained with the Tigers, though his ERA climbed to 2.82 in 22 1/3 innings pitched in 1969 and 4.85 in 78 innings pitched in 1970. In parts of four seasons with the Tigers, he compiled a 9–7 win–loss records with a 3.55 ERA and 121 strikeouts in 177 2/3 innings pitched.

Early in the 1971 season, Patterson balked in a run. The Tigers' new manager Billy Martin accused Patterson of doing it on purpose, an accusation that Patterson called "the craziest thing I’d ever heard." Patterson later recalled that Martin "just didn't like me" and arranged to have him traded on May 22.

=== Athletics and Cardinals ===
On May 22, 1971, the Tigers traded Patterson to the Oakland Athletics for John Donaldson. He appeared in only four games for the Athletics, compiling a 7.94 ERA in 5 2/3 innings pitched. On June 25, 1971, the Athletics sold Patterson to the St. Louis Cardinals. He appeared in 13 games for the Cardinals, compiling a 4.39 ERA in 26 2/3 innings pitched.

=== Return to the minors ===
Patterson spent the next two seasons in the minor leagues with the Iowa Oaks (5.37 ERA in 52 innings pitched in 1972) and Charleston Charlies (3.07 ERA in 82 innings pitched in 1973).

=== Pittsburgh Pirates ===
Patterson was acquired by the Pittsburgh Pirates before the 1973 season. He was brought up to the Pirates in 1974, compiled a 7.29 ERA in 21 innings pitched, and appeared in his last major league game on September 14, 1974. On July 14, 1974, Patterson was involved in a brawl during a game with the Cincinnati Reds where he was bitten and had his hair pulled by Reds pitcher Pedro Borbón. Patterson received a tetanus shot after the incident.

Patterson concluded his playing career playing in the Pirates' minor league organization with the Charleston Charlies in 1974 and 1975. In five major league seasons, he compiled an 11–9 record with a 4.09 ERA and 142 strikeouts in 231 innings pitched. He appeared in 142 major league games, only three of them as a starting pitcher.

Patterson had 35 at-bats without a hit in his major league career, with one run batted in and two bases on balls in 37 plate appearances.

== Later life and death ==
After retiring from baseball, Patterson worked for 20 years for Pacific Gas & Electric.

Patterson lived near Clovis, California. He died on August 28, 2025, at the age of 81.
