= Les Cain =

American baseball player (born 1948)

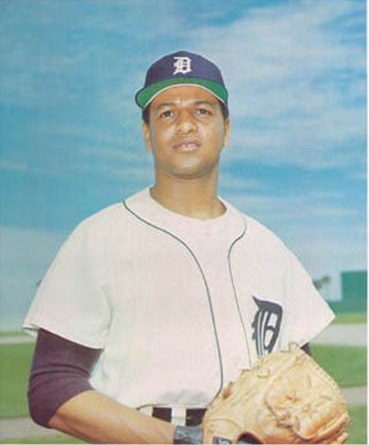
- Pitcher
- Born: January 13, 1948 (age 77); San Luis Obispo, California, U.S.
- Batted: Left Threw: Left

MLB debut
- April 28, 1968, for the Detroit Tigers

Last MLB appearance
- May 28, 1972, for the Detroit Tigers

MLB statistics
- Win–loss record: 23–19
- Earned run average: 3.98
- Strikeouts: 303
- Stats at Baseball Reference

Teams
- Detroit Tigers (1968, 1970–1972)

Leslie Cain (born January 13, 1948) is an American former starting pitcher in Major League Baseball who played for the Detroit Tigers. He batted and threw left-handed. In a four-season career, Cain posted a 23–19 record with 303 strikeouts and a 3.98 earned run average (ERA) in 373 innings. Cain was a promising pitcher who had his career cut short by an arm injury.

== Baseball career ==
In his 1968 rookie season with the Detroit Tigers, he went 1–0 with a 3.00 earned run average (ERA) in eight appearances, including four starts, but he was out the following season after developing arm problems.

In 1970 Cain recorded 12 victories and 156 strikeouts in 180 2/3 innings pitched, and finished 1971 with a 10–9 mark in 145 innings.

On August 28, 1971, Cain hit the last home run by a Tigers pitcher before the American League adopted the designated hitter rule in 1973. A Tiger pitcher did not hit a home run again until 2005.

== Workman's compensation case ==
Cain contended he was forced to pitch by Detroit manager Billy Martin while he had a sore arm. Cain later claimed that it did permanent damage to his arm and he sued the Tigers. In a landmark decision, the Michigan Bureau of Workman's Compensation ordered the Tigers to pay Cain $111 a week for the rest of his life.

== Personal life ==
Cain married Vera Nell Washington in 1968. He has a son, Brian Earl Cain, and a grandson, Brian Earl Cain, Jr.
