= Fred Lasher =

American baseball player (1941–2022)

- Pitcher
- Born: August 19, 1941; Poughkeepsie, New York, U.S.
- Died: February 27, 2022 (aged 80); Altoona, Wisconsin, U.S.
- Batted: Right Threw: Right

MLB debut
- April 12, 1963, for the Minnesota Twins

Last MLB appearance
- July 1, 1971, for the California Angels

MLB statistics
- Win–loss record: 11–13
- Earned run average: 3.88
- Strikeouts: 148
- Saves: 22
- Stats at Baseball Reference

Teams
- Minnesota Twins (1963); Detroit Tigers (1967–1970); Cleveland Indians (1970); California Angels (1971)

Career highlights and awards
- World Series Champion (1968)

Frederick Walter Lasher (August 19, 1941 – February 27, 2022) was an American Major League Baseball pitcher who played six seasons with the Minnesota Twins (1963), Detroit Tigers (1967–1970), Cleveland Indians (1970), and California Angels (1971). A sidewinder, Lasher was listed as 6 feet 3 inches (1.91 m) tall and 190 pounds (86 kg).

Lasher signed with the Twins' forebears, the American League's first Washington Senators franchise, in 1960 and debuted in the major leagues at age 21 in 1963. Over six major league seasons, he appeared in 151 games (all but one as a relief pitcher) and had a won–lost record of 11–13 with 22 saves and a 3.88 earned run average; in 202 innings pitched, he permitted 179 hits and 110 bases on balls; he struck out 148.

In 1968, Lasher appeared in 34 games for the pennant-winning and world champion Tigers, finishing with a 5–1 record and a 3.33 earned run average. He also pitched two scoreless innings in the 1968 World Series to help the Tigers beat the St. Louis Cardinals, four games to three. In 1970, Lasher appeared in a career-high 55 games for the Tigers and Indians. His major league career ended in 1971, when he worked in two games for the Angels and gave up four earned runs in 1 1/3 innings for a 27.00 earned run average.

In his only MLB starting pitcher assignment, on July 12, 1970, at Cleveland Stadium against the Boston Red Sox, Lasher recorded two outs in the first inning before permitting a single to Carl Yastrzemski. Lasher then threw a pitch that hit the next Boston batter, Tony Conigliaro, on his left forearm. An enraged Conigliaro charged Lasher on the mound, and, in the ensuing melee, he kicked Lasher in the hip (inflicting a spike wound), and punched him in the nose. Conigliaro was ejected from the game, but Lasher was allowed to continue on the mound. In the second inning, however, he surrendered back-to-back home runs to Conigliaro's brother and teammate, Billy, and Boston catcher Tom Satriano, and was removed from the game for a relief pitcher. Lasher then required a tetanus shot from a local hospital because of the spike wound he suffered in the first-inning brawl. Lasher was also charged with the 8–2 loss.

Lasher died on February 27, 2022, at the age of 80.
