= 1972 Boston Red Sox season =

Major League Baseball season

1972 Boston Red Sox
- League: American League
- Division: East
- Ballpark: Fenway Park
- City: Boston, Massachusetts
- Record: 85–70 (.548)
- Divisional place: 2nd
- Owner: Tom Yawkey
- President: Tom Yawkey
- General manager: Dick O'Connell
- Manager: Eddie Kasko
- Television: WBZ-TV, Ch. 4 (Ken Coleman, Johnny Pesky)
- Radio: WHDH-AM 850 (Ned Martin, Dave Martin, John MacLean)
- Stats: ESPN.com; Baseball Reference

The 1972 Boston Red Sox season was the 72nd season in the franchise's Major League Baseball history. The Red Sox finished second in the American League East with a record of 85 wins and 70 losses, one-half game behind the Detroit Tigers. Due to the cancellation of games missed during the 1972 Major League Baseball strike, Detroit played (and won) one more game than Boston, allowing them to finish with a record of 86–70, winning the division by a half-game.

== Offseason ==
- October 10, 1971: Jim Lonborg, Ken Brett, Billy Conigliaro, Joe Lahoud, Don Pavletich, and George Scott were traded by the Red Sox to the Milwaukee Brewers for Marty Pattin, Lew Krausse Jr., Tommy Harper, and Pat Skrable (minors).
- March 22, 1972: Sparky Lyle was traded by the Red Sox to the New York Yankees for Danny Cater and a player to be named later. The Yankees completed the deal by sending Mario Guerrero to the Red Sox on June 30.

=== A bad trade ===
After the 1971 season, the Red Sox management decided on drastic changes. First there was a trade with the Milwaukee Brewers. George Scott, who had fallen out of favor with the Red Sox management, was packaged with Billy Conigliaro (younger brother of former Red Sox star Tony Conigliaro), outfielders Joe Lahoud and Don Pavletich, pitchers Ken Brett (George Brett's older brother) and Jim Lonborg and exchanged for pitchers Marty Pattin and Lew Krausse Jr. and outfielders Tommy Harper and Pat Skrable. It was a big deal and, as it turned out, a bad one for Boston. Lonborg won 14 games for Milwaukee in 1972, with a 2.83 ERA, and later was traded to the Philadelphia Phillies, where he won 13, 17, 18, 8 and 11 games during five seasons. Scott batted .263, .266, .306, .281 and .285 in his five seasons with the Brewers, driving in 88, 107, 82, 109, and 77 runs during those same years and clouting an average of 23 homers a season, with 36 in 1975 alone. Meanwhile, although Pattin was 17–13 for Boston in 1972 a 15–15 in 1973, he was then traded away. Harper batted .254 and .281 in his two years with the Sox before being traded. Skrable, a Triple-A player, did not play professionally after the 1971 season. He refused to report to Boston, and the Red Sox received infielder Bobby Pfeil as compensation; Pfeil finished his career with Boston's Triple-A affiliate in 1972.

== Regular season ==
Record by month
Month	Record		Cumulative		AL East		Ref.
Month	Won	Lost	Won	Lost	Position	GB	Ref.
April	4	7	4	7	4th	3	
May	11	12	15	19	5th	4 1/2	
June	12	15	27	34	4th	7 1/2	
July	20	12	47	46	4th	7	
August	17	12	64	58	4th	2	
September	20	9	84	67	1st	+1 1/2	
October	1	3	85	70	2nd	1/2	

Following the 1972 Major League Baseball strike, Commissioner of Baseball Bowie Kuhn ruled that no games cancelled due to the April strike would be made up. The Red Sox played a total of 155 games of their original 162-game schedule, and finished with a record of 85–70. Meanwhile, the Detroit Tigers played 156 games, and finished with a record of 86–70. Thus, the Tigers were winners of the AL East, by a half-game over the Red Sox.

Boston and Detroit finished their regular-season schedules with a three-game series against each other, played at Tiger Stadium in Detroit. Entering the series, Boston held a half-game lead over Detroit, but Detroit won two of the three games, and the AL East title.

Final series, Boston at Detroit
Date	Game result	Boston record	Detroit record	AL East leader (GA)	Ref.
Entering the series		84–68 (.553)	84–69 (.549)	Boston (+0.5)	
October 2	Detroit 4–1	84–69 (.549)	85–69 (.552)	Detroit (+0.5)	
October 3	Detroit 3–1	84–70 (.545)	86–69 (.555)	Detroit (+1.5)	
October 4	Boston 4–1	85–70 (.548)	86–70 (.551)	Detroit (+0.5)	

The first game of the series included a notable play. In the top of the third inning, Boston trailed, 1–0, and had one out with Tommy Harper at third base and Luis Aparicio at first base. Carl Yastrzemski hit a ball that looked to be a triple; Harper scored, but Aparicio fell as he rounded third base. Aparicio got up and retreated to third, but Yastrzemski was already there, causing Yastrzemski to try to return to second, resulting in Yastrzemski being tagged out. Thus, instead of having a 2–1 lead with one out and a runner at third, Boston had only tied the game and had two outs (albeit still with a runner at third). The next batter, Reggie Smith, struck out to end the inning. Boston was unable to score again, and Detroit went on to win the game, 4–1. Aparicio falling as he rounded third base is looked back upon as a key play that could have made a difference.

=== Season standings ===
AL East
Team	W	L	Pct.	GB	Home	Road
Detroit Tigers	86	70	.551	—	44‍–‍34	42‍–‍36
Boston Red Sox	85	70	.548	½	52‍–‍26	33‍–‍44
Baltimore Orioles	80	74	.519	5	38‍–‍39	42‍–‍35
New York Yankees	79	76	.510	6½	46‍–‍31	33‍–‍45
Cleveland Indians	72	84	.462	14	43‍–‍34	29‍–‍50
Milwaukee Brewers	65	91	.417	21	37‍–‍42	28‍–‍49

=== Record vs. opponents ===
1972 American League records Sources:
Team	BAL	BOS	CAL	CWS	CLE	DET	KC	MIL	MIN	NYY	OAK	TEX
Baltimore	—	7–11	6–6	8–4	8–10	10–8	6–6	10–5	6–6	7–6	6–6	6–6
Boston	11–7	—	8–4	6–6	8–7	5–9	6–6	11–7	4–8	9–9	9–3	8–4
California	6–6	4–8	—	7–11	8–4	5–7	9–6	7–5	7–8	4–8	8–10	10–7
Chicago	4–8	6–6	11–7	—	8–4	5–7	8–9	9–3	8–6	7–5	7–8	14–4
Cleveland	10–8	7–8	4–8	4–8	—	10–8	6–6	5–10	8–4	7–11	2–10	9–3
Detroit	8–10	9–5	7–5	7–5	8–10	—	7–5	10–8	9–3	7–9	4–8	10–2
Kansas City	6–6	6–6	6–9	9–8	6–6	5–7	—	7–5	9–9	7–5	7–11	8–6
Milwaukee	5–10	7–11	5–7	3–9	10–5	8–10	5–7	—	4–8	9–9	4–8	5–7
Minnesota	6–6	8–4	8–7	6–8	4–8	3–9	9–9	8–4	—	6–6	8–9	11–7
New York	6–7	9–9	8–4	5–7	11–7	9–7	5–7	9–9	6–6	—	3–9	8–4
Oakland	6–6	3–9	10–8	8–7	10–2	8–4	11–7	8–4	9–8	9–3	—	11–4
Texas	6–6	4–8	7–10	4–14	3–9	2–10	6–8	7–5	7–11	4–8	4–11	—

=== Notable transactions ===
- June 6, 1972: Don Aase was drafted by the Red Sox in the 6th round of the 1972 Major League Baseball draft.
- August 15, 1972: Chris Coletta was traded by the Red Sox to the California Angels for Andy Kosco.

=== Opening Day lineup ===
4	Tommy Harper	CF
11	Luis Aparicio	SS
8	Carl Yastrzemski	LF
7	Reggie Smith	RF
6	Rico Petrocelli	3B
5	Danny Cater	1B
2	Doug Griffin	2B
24	Duane Josephson	C
33	Marty Pattin	P

=== Roster ===
1972 Boston Red Sox
Roster
Pitchers: 26 Bobby Bolin; 21 Ray Culp; 22 John Curtis; 39 Mike Garman; 18 Lew Krausse; 37 Bill Lee; 36 Lynn McGlothen; 29 Roger Moret; 15 Mike Nagy; 28 Don Newhauser; 33 Marty Pattin; 43 Gary Peters; 42 Sonny Siebert; 19 Ken Tatum; 23 Luis Tiant; 55 Bob Veale; 25 Stan Williams	Catchers: 48 Vic Correll; 27 Carlton Fisk; 10 Bob Montgomery; Infielders: 11 Luis Aparicio; 20 Juan Beníquez; 3 Bob Burda; 5 Danny Cater; 17 Cecil Cooper; 2 Doug Griffin; 24 Duane Josephson; 38 Buddy Hunter; 12 John Kennedy; 6 Rico Petrocelli	Outfielders: 24,40 Dwight Evans; 1 Phil Gagliano; 4 Tommy Harper; 44 Andy Kosco; 16 Rick Miller; 14 Ben Oglivie; 7 Reggie Smith; 8 Carl Yastrzemski; Other batters: 44 Bob Gallagher	Manager: 30 Eddie Kasko; Coaches: 34 Doug Camilli (Bullpen); 31 Don Lenhardt (First base); 32 Eddie Popowski (Third base); 35 Lee Stange (Pitching)

== Player stats ==
=== Batting ===
Note: G = Games played; AB = At bats; R = Runs; H = Hits; 2B = Doubles; 3B = Triples; HR = Home runs; RBI = Runs batted in; SB = Stolen bases; BB = Walks; AVG = Batting average; SLG = Slugging average

Player	G	AB	R	H	2B	3B	HR	RBI	SB	BB	AVG	SLG
Tommy Harper	144	556	92	141	29	2	14	49	25	67	.254	.388
Rico Petrocelli	147	521	62	125	15	2	15	75	0	78	.240	.363
Doug Griffin	129	470	43	122	12	1	2	35	9	45	.260	.302
Reggie Smith	131	467	75	126	25	4	21	74	15	68	.270	.475
Carlton Fisk	131	457	74	134	28	9	22	61	5	52	.293	.538
Carl Yastrzemski	125	455	70	120	18	2	12	68	5	67	.264	.391
Luis Aparicio	110	436	47	112	26	3	3	39	3	26	.257	.351
Danny Cater	92	317	32	75	17	1	8	39	0	15	.237	.372
Ben Oglivie	94	253	27	61	10	2	8	30	1	18	.241	.391
John Kennedy	71	212	22	52	11	1	2	22	0	18	.245	.335
Juan Beníquez	33	99	10	24	4	1	1	8	2	7	.242	.333
Rick Miller	89	98	13	21	4	1	3	15	0	11	.214	.367
Phil Gagliano	52	82	9	21	4	1	0	10	1	10	.256	.329
Duane Josephson	26	82	11	22	4	1	1	7	0	4	.268	.378
Bob Montgomery	24	77	7	22	1	0	2	7	0	3	.286	.377
Bob Burda	45	73	4	12	1	0	2	9	0	8	.164	.260
Dwight Evans	18	57	2	15	3	1	1	6	0	7	.263	.404
Andy Kosco	17	47	5	10	2	1	3	6	0	2	.213	.489
Cecil Cooper	12	17	0	4	1	0	0	2	0	2	.235	.294
Bob Gallagher	7	5	0	0	0	0	0	0	0	0	.000	.000
Vic Correll	1	4	1	2	0	0	0	1	0	0	.500	.500
Pitcher totals	155	423	34	68	14	1	4	31	0	14	.161	.227
Team totals	155	5208	640	1289	229	34	124	594	66	522	.248	.376

=== Pitching ===
Note: W = Wins; L = Losses; ERA = Earned run average; G = Games pitched; GS = Games started; SV = Saves; IP = Innings pitched; H = Hits allowed; R = Runs allowed; ER = Earned runs allowed; BB = Walks allowed; SO = Strikeouts

Player	W	L	ERA	G	GS	SV	IP	H	R	ER	BB	SO
Marty Pattin	17	13	3.24	38	35	0	253.0	232	102	91	65	168
Sonny Siebert	12	12	3.80	32	30	0	196.1	204	105	83	59	123
Luis Tiant	15	6	1.91	43	19	3	179.0	128	45	38	65	123
John Curtis	11	8	3.73	26	21	0	154.1	161	69	64	50	106
Lynn McGlothen	8	7	3.41	22	22	0	145.0	135	66	55	59	112
Ray Culp	5	8	4.46	16	16	0	105.0	104	60	52	53	52
Gary Peters	3	3	4.32	33	4	1	85.1	91	48	41	38	67
Bill Lee	7	4	3.20	47	0	5	84.1	75	31	30	32	43
Lew Krausse Jr.	1	3	6.38	24	7	1	60.2	74	48	43	28	35
Don Newhauser	4	2	2.43	31	0	4	37.0	30	11	10	25	27
Bobby Bolin	0	1	2.93	21	0	5	30.2	24	11	10	11	27
Ken Tatum	0	2	3.07	22	0	4	29.1	32	12	10	15	15
Bob Veale	2	0	0.00	6	0	2	8.0	2	0	0	3	10
Roger Moret	0	0	3.60	3	0	0	5.0	5	3	2	6	4
Stan Williams	0	0	6.23	3	0	0	4.1	5	3	3	1	3
Mike Garman	0	1	10.80	3	1	0	3.1	4	4	4	2	1
Mike Nagy	0	0	9.00	1	0	0	2.0	3	2	2	0	2
Team totals	85	70	3.47	155	155	25	1382.2	1309	620	533	512	918

== Statistical leaders ==
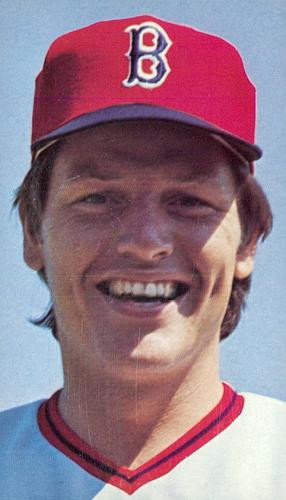
Carlton Fisk

Category	Player	Statistic
Youngest player	Dwight Evans	20
Oldest player	Luis Aparicio	38
Wins Above Replacement	Carlton Fisk	7.3

=== Batting ===
Abbr.	Category	Player	Statistic
G	Games played	Rico Petrocelli	147
PA	Plate appearances	Tommy Harper	641
AB	At bats	Tommy Harper	556
R	Runs scored	Tommy Harper	92
H	Hits	Tommy Harper	141
2B	Doubles	Tommy Harper	29
3B	Triples	Carlton Fisk	9
HR	Home runs	Carlton Fisk	22
RBI	Runs batted in	Rico Petrocelli	75
SB	Stolen bases	Tommy Harper	25
CS	Caught stealing	Tommy Harper	7
BB	Base on balls	Rico Petrocelli	78
SO	Strikeouts	Tommy Harper	104
BA	Batting average	Carlton Fisk	.293
OBP	On-base percentage	Carlton Fisk	.370
SLG	Slugging percentage	Carlton Fisk	.538
OPS	On-base plus slugging	Carlton Fisk	.909
OPS+	Adjusted OPS	Carlton Fisk	162
TB	Total bases	Carlton Fisk	246
GIDP	Grounded into double play	Danny Cater	16
HBP	Hit by pitch	Tommy Harper	9
SH	Sacrifice hits	Doug Griffin	15
SF	Sacrifice flies	Carl Yastrzemski	9
IBB	Intentional base on balls	Reggie Smith	12

=== Pitching ===
Abbr.	Category	Player	Statistic
W	Wins	Marty Pattin	17
L	Losses	Marty Pattin	13
W-L %	Winning percentage	Luis Tiant	.714 (15–6)
ERA	Earned run average	Luis Tiant	1.91
G	Games pitched	Bill Lee	47
GS	Games started	Marty Pattin	35
GF	Games finished	Don Newhauser	17
GF	Games finished	Gary Peters	17
CG	Complete games	Marty Pattin	13
SHO	Shutouts	Luis Tiant	6
SV	Saves	Bob Bolin	5
SV	Saves	Bill Lee	5
IP	Innings pitched	Marty Pattin	253
SO	Strikeouts	Marty Pattin	168
WHIP	Walks plus hits per inning pitched	Luis Tiant	1.078

== Awards and honors ==
- Carlton Fisk, Gold Glove Award (C)

== Farm system ==
Level	Team	League	Manager
AAA	Louisville Colonels	International League	Darrell Johnson
AA	Pawtucket Red Sox	Eastern League	Don Lock
A	Winston-Salem Red Sox	Carolina League	Rac Slider
A	Winter Haven Red Sox	Florida State League	John Butler
A-Short Season	Williamsport Red Sox	New York–Penn League	Dick Berardino
