= 1971 Boston Red Sox season =

Major League Baseball season

1971 Boston Red Sox
- League: American League
- Division: East
- Ballpark: Fenway Park
- City: Boston, Massachusetts
- Record: 85–77 (.525)
- Divisional place: 3rd
- Owner: Tom Yawkey
- President: Tom Yawkey
- General manager: Dick O'Connell
- Manager: Eddie Kasko
- Television: WHDH-TV, Ch. 5
- Radio: WHDH-AM 850 (Ken Coleman, Ned Martin, Johnny Pesky)
- Stats: ESPN.com; Baseball Reference

The 1971 Boston Red Sox season was the 71st season in the franchise's Major League Baseball history. The Red Sox finished third in the American League East with a record of 85 wins and 77 losses, 18 games behind the Baltimore Orioles, who went on to win the AL championship.

== Offseason ==
- December 3, 1970: Carmen Fanzone was traded by the Red Sox to the Chicago Cubs for Phil Gagliano.
- December 31, 1970: Chuck Hartenstein was purchased from the Red Sox by the Chicago White Sox.
- January 13, 1971: John Tamargo was drafted by the Red Sox in the 3rd round of the 1971 Major League Baseball draft (secondary phase), but did not sign.
- March 31, 1971: Tony Muser and Vicente Romo were traded by the Red Sox to the Chicago White Sox for Duane Josephson and Danny Murphy.

== Regular season ==
Record by month
Month	Record		Cumulative		AL East		Ref.
Month	Won	Lost	Won	Lost	Position	GB	Ref.
April	12	7	12	7	1st	+1/2	
May	17	11	29	18	1st	+1 1/2	
June	14	13	43	31	2nd	3 1/2	
July	16	14	59	45	2nd	6 1/2	
August	11	19	70	64	3rd	13 1/2	
September	15	13	85	77	3rd	18	

=== Highlights ===
In the second year of Eddie Kasko's management, the Red Sox finished 16 games behind the eventual American League champions Baltimore Orioles. The Sox did not have a .300 hitter in 1971, with Reggie Smith's .283 batting average being the best among their regulars. Tony Conigliaro, his health still a question, had been traded the previous October to the California Angels for reliever Ken Tatum and rookie infielder Doug Griffin. Conigliaro played in 74 games for the Angels in 1971 but then had to give up baseball, his sight having deteriorated greatly. Tatum was 2–4 with the Red Sox, and Griffin batted .244, while becoming the regular second baseman.

Highlights of an otherwise forgettable season included the late arrival of a big catcher from Bellows Falls, Vermont, Carlton Fisk, who got into 14 games for the 1971 Sox and hit two home runs. Making a bigger splash was a utility fielder who had been acquired in 1970 from the New York Yankees but came into his own in 1971. John Kennedy hit .272, with five homers and 22 RBIs, and was nicknamed "Super Sub".

Another bright spot for the Sox in '71 was Jim Lonborg's winning 10 games (and losing 7). But Sonny Siebert, a pitcher acquired in a deal with the Cleveland Indians in 1969, was the top hurler for Boston, winning 16 games. A feisty left-hander, Sparky Lyle was 6–4, with 16 saves and a 2.75 ERA.

=== Season standings ===
AL East
Team	W	L	Pct.	GB	Home	Road
Baltimore Orioles	101	57	.639	—	53‍–‍24	48‍–‍33
Detroit Tigers	91	71	.562	12	54‍–‍27	37‍–‍44
Boston Red Sox	85	77	.525	18	47‍–‍33	38‍–‍44
New York Yankees	82	80	.506	21	44‍–‍37	38‍–‍43
Washington Senators	63	96	.396	38½	35‍–‍46	28‍–‍50
Cleveland Indians	60	102	.370	43	29‍–‍52	31‍–‍50

=== Record vs. opponents ===
1971 American League record Sources:
Team	BAL	BOS	CAL	CWS	CLE	DET	KC	MIL	MIN	NYY	OAK	WAS
Baltimore	—	9–9	7–5	8–4	13–5	8–10	6–5	9–3	10–2	11–7	7–4	13–3
Boston	9–9	—	6–6	10–2	11–7	12–6	1–11	6–6	8–4	7–11	3–9	12–6
California	5–7	6–6	—	8–10	8–4	6–6	8–10	6–12	12–6	6–6	7–11	4–8
Chicago	4–8	2–10	10–8	—	3–9	7–5	9–9	11–7	7–11	5–7	11–7	10–2
Cleveland	5–13	7–11	4–8	9–3	—	6–12	2–10	4–8	4–8	8–10	4–8	7–11
Detroit	10–8	6–12	6–6	5–7	12–6	—	8–4	10–2	6–6	10–8	4–8	14–4
Kansas City	5–6	11–1	10–8	9–9	10–2	4–8	—	8–10	9–9	5–7	5–13	9–3
Milwaukee	3–9	6–6	12–6	7–11	8–4	2–10	10–8	—	10–7	2–10	3–15	6–6
Minnesota	2–10	4–8	6–12	11–7	8–4	6–6	9–9	7–10	—	8–4	8–10	5–6
New York	7–11	11–7	6–6	7–5	10–8	8–10	7–5	10–2	4–8	—	5–7	7–11
Oakland	4–7	9–3	11–7	7–11	8–4	8–4	13–5	15–3	10–8	7–5	—	9–3
Washington	3–13	6–12	8–4	2–10	11–7	4–14	3–9	6–6	6–5	11–7	3–9	—

=== Notable transactions ===
- April 7, 1971: Tom Satriano was released by the Red Sox.
- May 17, 1971: Luis Tiant was signed as a free agent by the Red Sox.

=== Opening Day lineup ===
11	Luis Aparicio	SS
7	Reggie Smith	CF
8	Carl Yastrzemski	LF
6	Rico Petrocelli	3B
5	George Scott	1B
24	Duane Josephson	C
40	Billy Conigliaro	CF
2	Doug Griffin	2B
21	Ray Culp	P

=== Roster ===
1971 Boston Red Sox
Roster
Pitchers: 26 Bobby Bolin; 18 Ken Brett; 21 Ray Culp; 22 John Curtis; 39 Mike Garman; 17 Cal Koonce; 37 Bill Lee; 16 Jim Lonborg; 28 Sparky Lyle; 29 Roger Moret; 15 Mike Nagy; 43 Gary Peters; 42 Sonny Siebert; 25 Ken Tatum; 23 Luis Tiant	Catchers: 27 Carlton Fisk; 24 Duane Josephson; 10 Bob Montgomery; 19 Don Pavletich; Infielders: 11 Luis Aparicio; 20 Juan Beníquez; 17 Cecil Cooper; 3 Mike Fiore; 2 Doug Griffin; 38 Buddy Hunter; 12 John Kennedy; 6 Rico Petrocelli; 5 George Scott	Outfielders: 40 Billy Conigliaro; 1 Phil Gagliano; 14 Joe Lahoud; 35 Rick Miller; 4 Ben Oglivie; 7 Reggie Smith; 22 George Thomas; 8 Carl Yastrzemski	Manager: 30 Eddie Kasko; Coaches: 34 Doug Camilli (Bullpen); 33 Harvey Haddix (Pitching); 31 Don Lenhardt (First base); 32 Eddie Popowski (Third base)

== Player stats ==
=== Batting ===
Note: G = Games played; AB = At bats; R = Runs; H = Hits; 2B = Doubles; 3B = Triples; HR = Home runs; RBI = Runs batted in; SB = Stolen bases; BB = Walks; AVG = Batting average; SLG = Slugging average

Player	G	AB	R	H	2B	3B	HR	RBI	SB	BB	AVG	SLG
Reggie Smith	159	618	85	175	33	2	30	96	11	63	.283	.489
Rico Petrocelli	158	553	82	139	24	4	28	89	2	91	.251	.461
George Scott	146	537	72	141	16	4	24	78	0	41	.263	.441
Carl Yastrzemski	148	508	75	129	21	2	15	70	8	106	.254	.392
Luis Aparicio	125	491	56	114	23	0	4	45	6	35	.232	.303
Doug Griffin	125	483	51	118	23	2	3	27	11	31	.244	.319
Billy Conigliaro	101	351	42	92	26	1	11	33	3	25	.262	.436
Duane Josephson	91	306	38	75	14	1	10	39	2	22	.245	.395
John Kennedy	74	272	41	75	12	5	5	22	1	14	.276	.412
Joe Lahoud	107	256	39	55	9	3	14	32	2	40	.215	.438
Bob Montgomery	67	205	19	49	11	2	2	24	1	16	.239	.341
Phil Gagliano	47	68	11	22	5	0	0	13	0	11	.324	.397
Mike Fiore	51	62	9	11	2	0	1	6	0	12	.177	.258
Juan Beníquez	16	57	8	17	2	0	0	4	3	3	.298	.333
Carlton Fisk	14	48	7	15	2	1	2	6	0	1	.313	.521
Cecil Cooper	14	42	9	13	4	1	0	3	1	5	.310	.452
Ben Oglivie	14	38	2	10	3	0	0	4	0	0	.263	.342
Rick Miller	15	33	9	11	5	0	1	7	0	8	.333	.576
Don Pavletich	14	27	5	7	1	0	1	3	0	5	.259	.407
George Thomas	9	13	0	1	0	0	0	1	0	1	.077	.077
Buddy Hunter	8	9	2	2	1	0	0	0	0	2	.222	.333
Pitcher totals	162	424	29	89	9	0	10	48	0	20	.210	.302
Team totals	162	5401	691	1360	246	28	161	650	51	552	.252	.397

=== Pitching ===
Note: W = Wins; L = Losses; ERA = Earned run average; G = Games pitched; GS = Games started; SV = Saves; IP = Innings pitched; H = Hits allowed; R = Runs allowed; ER = Earned runs allowed; BB = Walks allowed; SO = Strikeouts

Player	W	L	ERA	G	GS	SV	IP	H	R	ER	BB	SO
Ray Culp	14	16	3.60	35	35	0	242.1	236	108	97	67	151
Sonny Siebert	16	10	2.91	32	32	0	235.1	220	84	76	60	131
Gary Peters	14	11	4.37	34	32	1	214.0	241	111	104	70	100
Jim Lonborg	10	7	4.13	27	26	0	167.2	167	86	77	67	100
Bill Lee	9	2	2.74	47	3	2	102.0	102	35	31	46	74
Luis Tiant	1	7	4.85	21	10	0	72.1	73	42	39	32	59
Roger Moret	4	3	2.92	13	7	0	71.0	50	24	23	40	47
Bobby Bolin	5	3	4.26	52	0	6	69.2	74	34	33	24	51
Ken Brett	0	3	5.34	29	2	1	59.0	57	38	35	35	57
Ken Tatum	2	4	4.19	36	1	9	53.2	50	27	25	25	21
Sparky Lyle	6	4	2.75	50	0	16	52.1	41	16	16	23	37
Mike Nagy	1	3	6.63	12	7	0	38.0	46	29	28	20	9
John Curtis	2	2	3.12	5	3	0	26.0	30	9	9	6	19
Cal Koonce	0	1	5.57	13	1	0	21.0	22	16	13	11	9
Mike Garman	1	1	3.86	3	3	0	18.2	15	8	8	9	6
Team totals	85	77	3.80	162	162	35	1443.0	1424	667	610	535	871

== Statistical leaders ==
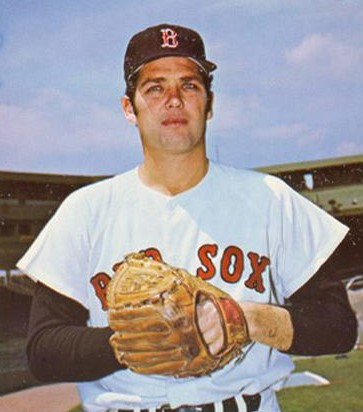
Sonny Siebert

Category	Player	Statistic
Youngest player	Juan Beníquez; Cecil Cooper; Mike Garman; Roger Moret	21
Oldest player	Luis Aparicio	37
Wins Above Replacement	Sonny Siebert	6.6

=== Batting ===
Abbr.	Category	Player	Statistic
G	Games played	Reggie Smith	159
PA	Plate appearances	Reggie Smith	692
AB	At bats	Reggie Smith	618
R	Runs scored	Reggie Smith	85
H	Hits	Reggie Smith	175
2B	Doubles	Reggie Smith	33
3B	Triples	John Kennedy	5
HR	Home runs	Reggie Smith	30
RBI	Runs batted in	Reggie Smith	96
SB	Stolen bases	Doug Griffin	11
SB	Stolen bases	Reggie Smith	11
CS	Caught stealing	Carl Yastrzemski	7
BB	Base on balls	Carl Yastrzemski	106
SO	Strikeouts	Rico Petrocelli	108
BA	Batting average	Reggie Smith	.283
OBP	On-base percentage	Carl Yastrzemski	.381
SLG	Slugging percentage	Reggie Smith	.489
OPS	On-base plus slugging	Reggie Smith	.840
OPS+	Adjusted OPS	Reggie Smith	129
TB	Total bases	Reggie Smith	302
GIDP	Grounded into double play	George Scott	23
HBP	Hit by pitch	George Scott	5
HBP	Hit by pitch	Reggie Smith	5
SH	Sacrifice hits	Ray Culp	17
SF	Sacrifice flies	Rico Petrocelli	9
IBB	Intentional base on balls	Carl Yastrzemski	12

=== Pitching ===
Abbr.	Category	Player	Statistic
W	Wins	Sonny Siebert	16
L	Losses	Ray Culp	16
W-L %	Winning percentage	Bill Lee	.818 (9–2)
ERA	Earned run average	Sonny Siebert	2.91
G	Games pitched	Bob Bolin	52
GS	Games started	Ray Culp	35
GF	Games finished	Sparky Lyle	36
CG	Complete games	Ray Culp	12
CG	Complete games	Sonny Siebert	12
SHO	Shutouts	Sonny Siebert	4
SV	Saves	Sparky Lyle	16
IP	Innings pitched	Ray Culp	242 1/3
SO	Strikeouts	Ray Culp	151
WHIP	Walks plus hits per inning pitched	Sonny Siebert	1.190

== Awards and honors ==
- George Scott, Gold Glove Award (1B)
- Carl Yastrzemski, Gold Glove Award (OF)

== Farm system ==
Level	Team	League	Manager
AAA	Louisville Colonels	International League	Darrell Johnson
AA	Pawtucket Red Sox	Eastern League	Billy Gardner
A	Winston-Salem Red Sox	Carolina League	Don Lock
A	Winter Haven Red Sox	Florida State League	John Butler
A	Greenville Red Sox	Western Carolinas League	Rac Slider
A-Short Season	Williamsport Red Sox	New York–Penn League	Dick Berardino
