= 1970 Boston Red Sox season =

Major League Baseball season

1970 Boston Red Sox
- League: American League
- Division: East
- Ballpark: Fenway Park
- City: Boston, Massachusetts
- Record: 87–75 (.537)
- Divisional place: 3rd
- Owner: Tom Yawkey
- President: Tom Yawkey
- General manager: Dick O'Connell
- Manager: Eddie Kasko
- Television: WHDH-TV, Ch. 5
- Radio: WHDH-AM 850 (Ken Coleman, Ned Martin, Johnny Pesky)
- Stats: ESPN.com; Baseball Reference

The 1970 Boston Red Sox season was the 70th season in the franchise's Major League Baseball history. The Red Sox finished third in the American League East with a record of 87 wins and 75 losses, 21 games behind the Baltimore Orioles, who went on to win the AL championship and the 1970 World Series.

== Offseason ==
- December 13, 1969: Dalton Jones was traded by the Red Sox to the Detroit Tigers for Tom Matchick.

== Regular season ==
The 1970s began with a new manager for the Red Sox. After the firing of Dick Williams near the end of the 1969 season, general manager Dick O'Connell reached down into the farm system again for a replacement and came up with Eddie Kasko, who had managed the Red Sox Triple-A farm team, the Louisville Colonels, to a second-place finish in 1969. Kasko had been a major league infielder from 1957 to 1966, with the St. Louis Cardinals, Cincinnati Reds, Houston Astros, and the Red Sox.

Record by month
| Month | Record | | Cumulative | | AL East | | Ref. |
| Month | Won | Lost | Won | Lost | Position | GB | Ref. |
|---|---|---|---|---|---|---|---|
| April | 11 | 8 | 11 | 8 | 3rd (tie) | 2 | |
| May | 9 | 17 | 20 | 25 | 5th | 11 1/2 | |
| June | 14 | 11 | 34 | 36 | 4th | 10 1/2 | |
| July | 18 | 13 | 52 | 49 | 4th | 11 | |
| August | 16 | 14 | 68 | 63 | 4th | 17 | |
| September | 19 | 12 | 87 | 75 | 3rd | 20 1/2 | |
| October† | 0 | 0 | 87 | 75 | 3rd | 21 | |

† Several other teams finished their season on October 1.

Kasko took over a team in transition in 1970. Its leading pitcher was Ray Culp, with 17 wins. Jim Lonborg, the superstar of 1967, still was not back in form and went 4–1. Carl Yastrzemski led the American League with a .329 batting average, and Tony Conigliaro appeared to have recovered from the horrible beaning of 1967, hitting .266, with 36 home runs and 116 RBIs. Reggie Smith hit .303, and George Scott had a banner year at .296, with 16 homers and 63 RBIs. Unfortunately, the Red Sox finished 21 games behind the rampaging Baltimore Orioles, who won 108 games and then went on to defeat the Cincinnati Reds in the 1970 World Series.

There were no scheduled doubleheaders this season at Fenway Park.

=== Season standings ===
AL East
| Team | W | L | Pct. | GB | Home | Road |
|---|---|---|---|---|---|---|
| Baltimore Orioles | 108 | 54 | .667 | — | 59‍–‍22 | 49‍–‍32 |
| New York Yankees | 93 | 69 | .574 | 15 | 53‍–‍28 | 40‍–‍41 |
| Boston Red Sox | 87 | 75 | .537 | 21 | 52‍–‍29 | 35‍–‍46 |
| Detroit Tigers | 79 | 83 | .488 | 29 | 42‍–‍39 | 37‍–‍44 |
| Cleveland Indians | 76 | 86 | .469 | 32 | 43‍–‍38 | 33‍–‍48 |
| Washington Senators | 70 | 92 | .432 | 38 | 40‍–‍41 | 30‍–‍51 |

=== Record vs. opponents ===
1970 American League record Sources:
| Team | BAL | BOS | CAL | CWS | CLE | DET | KC | MIL | MIN | NYY | OAK | WAS |
|---|---|---|---|---|---|---|---|---|---|---|---|---|
| Baltimore | — | 13–5 | 7–5 | 9–3 | 14–4 | 11–7 | 12–0 | 7–5 | 5–7 | 11–7 | 7–5 | 12–6 |
| Boston | 5–13 | — | 5–7 | 8–4 | 12–6 | 9–9 | 7–5 | 5–7 | 7–5 | 10–8 | 7–5 | 12–6 |
| California | 5–7 | 7–5 | — | 12–6 | 6–6 | 6–6 | 10–8 | 12–6 | 8–10 | 5–7 | 8–10 | 7–5 |
| Chicago | 3–9 | 4–8 | 6–12 | — | 6–6 | 6–6 | 7–11 | 7–11 | 6–12 | 5–7 | 2–16 | 4–8 |
| Cleveland | 4–14 | 6–12 | 6–6 | 6–6 | — | 7–11 | 8–4 | 7–5 | 6–6 | 8–10 | 7–5 | 11–7 |
| Detroit | 7–11 | 9–9 | 6–6 | 6–6 | 11–7 | — | 6–6 | 8–4 | 4–8 | 7–11 | 6–6 | 9–9 |
| Kansas City | 0–12 | 5–7 | 8–10 | 11–7 | 4–8 | 6–6 | — | 12–6 | 5–13 | 1–11 | 7–11 | 6–6 |
| Milwaukee | 5–7 | 7–5 | 6–12 | 11–7 | 5–7 | 4–8 | 6–12 | — | 5–13 | 3–9–1 | 8–10 | 5–7 |
| Minnesota | 7–5 | 5–7 | 10–8 | 12–6 | 6–6 | 8–4 | 13–5 | 13–5 | — | 5–7 | 13–5 | 6–6 |
| New York | 7–11 | 8–10 | 7–5 | 7–5 | 10–8 | 11–7 | 11–1 | 9–3–1 | 7–5 | — | 6–6 | 10–8 |
| Oakland | 5–7 | 5–7 | 10–8 | 16–2 | 5–7 | 6–6 | 11–7 | 10–8 | 5–13 | 6–6 | — | 10–2 |
| Washington | 6–12 | 6–12 | 5–7 | 8–4 | 7–11 | 9–9 | 6–6 | 7–5 | 6–6 | 8–10 | 2–10 | — |

=== Notable transactions ===
- May 28, 1970: Tom Matchick was traded by the Red Sox to the Kansas City Royals for Mike Fiore.
- July 14, 1970: Chuck Hartenstein was acquired by the Red Sox from the St. Louis Cardinals as part of a conditional deal.

=== Opening Day lineup ===
| 2 | Mike Andrews | 2B |
| 7 | Reggie Smith | CF |
| 8 | Carl Yastrzemski | LF |
| 5 | George Scott | 1B |
| 6 | Rico Petrocelli | SS |
| 25 | Tony Conigliaro | RF |
| 1 | Luis Alvarado | 3B |
| 10 | Jerry Moses | C |
| 43 | Gary Peters | P |

=== Roster ===
1970 Boston Red Sox
Roster
| Pitchers: 16 Bobby Bolin; 18 Ken Brett; 21 Ray Culp; 44 John Curtis; 23 Chuck Hartenstein; 17 Ray Jarvis; 17 Cal Koonce; 37 Bill Lee; 16 Jim Lonborg; 28 Sparky Lyle; 36 Dick Mills; 29 Roger Moret; 15 Mike Nagy; 43 Gary Peters; 27 Ed Phillips; 24 Vicente Romo; 36 José Santiago; 42 Sonny Siebert; 20 Lee Stange; 35 Gary Wagner | Catchers: 39 Bob Montgomery; 10 Jerry Moses; 4 Tom Satriano; Infielders: 1 Luis Alvarado; 2 Mike Andrews; 20 Carmen Fanzone; 3 Mike Fiore; 12 John Kennedy; 3 Tom Matchick; 19 Don Pavletich; 6 Rico Petrocelli; 11 Dick Schofield; 5 George Scott; 8 Carl Yastrzemski | Outfielders: 40 Billy Conigliaro; 25 Tony Conigliaro; 23 Mike Derrick; 14 Joe Lahoud; 7 Reggie Smith; 22 George Thomas | Manager: 30 Eddie Kasko; Coaches: 34 Doug Camilli (Bullpen); 31 Don Lenhardt (First base); 32 Eddie Popowski (Third base); 22 George Thomas; 33 Charlie Wagner (Pitching) |

== Player stats ==
=== Batting ===
Note: G = Games played; AB = At bats; R = Runs; H = Hits; 2B = Doubles; 3B = Triples; HR = Home runs; RBI = Runs batted in; SB = Stolen bases; BB = Walks; AVG = Batting average; SLG = Slugging average

| Player | G | AB | R | H | 2B | 3B | HR | RBI | SB | BB | AVG | SLG |
|---|---|---|---|---|---|---|---|---|---|---|---|---|
| Mike Andrews | 151 | 589 | 91 | 149 | 28 | 1 | 17 | 65 | 2 | 81 | .253 | .390 |
| Rico Petrocelli | 157 | 583 | 82 | 152 | 31 | 3 | 29 | 103 | 1 | 67 | .261 | .473 |
| Reggie Smith | 147 | 580 | 109 | 176 | 32 | 7 | 22 | 74 | 10 | 51 | .303 | .497 |
| Carl Yastrzemski | 161 | 566 | 125 | 186 | 29 | 0 | 40 | 102 | 23 | 128 | .329 | .592 |
| Tony Conigliaro | 146 | 560 | 89 | 149 | 20 | 1 | 36 | 116 | 4 | 43 | .266 | .498 |
| George Scott | 127 | 480 | 50 | 142 | 24 | 5 | 16 | 63 | 4 | 44 | .296 | .467 |
| Billy Conigliaro | 114 | 398 | 59 | 108 | 16 | 3 | 18 | 58 | 3 | 35 | .271 | .462 |
| Jerry Moses | 92 | 315 | 26 | 83 | 18 | 1 | 6 | 35 | 1 | 21 | .263 | .384 |
| Luis Alvarado | 59 | 183 | 19 | 41 | 11 | 0 | 1 | 10 | 1 | 9 | .224 | .301 |
| Tom Satriano | 59 | 165 | 21 | 39 | 9 | 1 | 3 | 13 | 0 | 21 | .236 | .358 |
| Ducky Schofield | 76 | 139 | 16 | 26 | 1 | 2 | 1 | 14 | 0 | 21 | .187 | .245 |
| John Kennedy | 43 | 129 | 15 | 33 | 7 | 1 | 4 | 17 | 0 | 6 | .256 | .419 |
| George Thomas | 38 | 99 | 13 | 34 | 8 | 0 | 2 | 13 | 0 | 11 | .343 | .485 |
| Bob Montgomery | 22 | 78 | 8 | 14 | 2 | 0 | 1 | 4 | 0 | 6 | .179 | .244 |
| Don Pavletich | 32 | 65 | 4 | 9 | 1 | 1 | 0 | 6 | 1 | 10 | .138 | .185 |
| Mike Fiore | 41 | 50 | 5 | 7 | 0 | 0 | 0 | 4 | 0 | 8 | .140 | .140 |
| Joe Lahoud | 17 | 49 | 6 | 12 | 1 | 0 | 2 | 5 | 0 | 7 | .245 | .388 |
| Mike Derrick | 24 | 33 | 3 | 7 | 1 | 0 | 0 | 5 | 0 | 0 | .212 | .242 |
| Carmen Fanzone | 10 | 15 | 0 | 3 | 1 | 0 | 0 | 3 | 0 | 2 | .200 | .267 |
| Tommy Matchick | 10 | 14 | 2 | 1 | 0 | 0 | 0 | 0 | 0 | 2 | .071 | .071 |
| Pitcher totals | 162 | 445 | 43 | 79 | 12 | 2 | 5 | 33 | 0 | 21 | .178 | .247 |
| Team totals | 162 | 5535 | 786 | 1450 | 252 | 28 | 203 | 743 | 50 | 594 | .262 | .428 |

=== Pitching ===
Note: W = Wins; L = Losses; ERA = Earned run average; G = Games pitched; GS = Games started; SV = Saves; IP = Innings pitched; H = Hits allowed; R = Runs allowed; ER = Earned runs allowed; BB = Walks allowed; SO = Strikeouts

| Player | W | L | ERA | G | GS | SV | IP | H | R | ER | BB | SO |
|---|---|---|---|---|---|---|---|---|---|---|---|---|
| Ray Culp | 17 | 14 | 3.04 | 33 | 33 | 0 | 251.1 | 211 | 104 | 85 | 91 | 197 |
| Sonny Siebert | 15 | 8 | 3.44 | 33 | 33 | 0 | 222.2 | 207 | 98 | 85 | 60 | 142 |
| Gary Peters | 16 | 11 | 4.06 | 34 | 34 | 0 | 221.2 | 221 | 114 | 100 | 83 | 155 |
| Ken Brett | 8 | 9 | 4.07 | 41 | 14 | 2 | 139.1 | 118 | 71 | 63 | 79 | 155 |
| Mike Nagy | 6 | 5 | 4.48 | 23 | 20 | 0 | 128.2 | 138 | 71 | 64 | 64 | 56 |
| Vicente Romo | 7 | 3 | 4.08 | 48 | 10 | 6 | 108.0 | 115 | 51 | 49 | 43 | 71 |
| Cal Koonce | 3 | 4 | 3.54 | 23 | 8 | 2 | 76.1 | 64 | 32 | 30 | 29 | 37 |
| Sparky Lyle | 1 | 7 | 3.88 | 63 | 0 | 20 | 67.1 | 62 | 37 | 29 | 34 | 51 |
| Gary Wagner | 3 | 1 | 3.35 | 38 | 0 | 7 | 40.0 | 36 | 21 | 15 | 19 | 20 |
| Bill Lee | 2 | 2 | 4.62 | 11 | 5 | 1 | 37.0 | 48 | 20 | 19 | 14 | 19 |
| Jim Lonborg | 4 | 1 | 3.18 | 9 | 4 | 0 | 34.0 | 33 | 12 | 12 | 9 | 21 |
| Lee Stange | 2 | 2 | 5.60 | 20 | 0 | 2 | 27.1 | 34 | 24 | 17 | 12 | 14 |
| Ed Phillips | 0 | 2 | 5.32 | 18 | 0 | 0 | 23.2 | 29 | 14 | 14 | 10 | 23 |
| Chuck Hartenstein | 0 | 3 | 8.05 | 17 | 0 | 1 | 19.0 | 21 | 17 | 17 | 12 | 12 |
| Ray Jarvis | 0 | 1 | 3.94 | 15 | 0 | 0 | 16.0 | 17 | 12 | 7 | 14 | 8 |
| José Santiago | 0 | 2 | 10.32 | 8 | 0 | 1 | 11.1 | 18 | 13 | 13 | 8 | 8 |
| Roger Moret | 1 | 0 | 3.24 | 3 | 1 | 0 | 8.1 | 7 | 3 | 3 | 4 | 2 |
| Bobby Bolin | 2 | 0 | 0.00 | 6 | 0 | 2 | 8.0 | 2 | 0 | 0 | 5 | 8 |
| Dick Mills | 0 | 0 | 2.45 | 2 | 0 | 0 | 3.2 | 6 | 4 | 1 | 3 | 3 |
| John Curtis | 0 | 0 | 11.57 | 1 | 0 | 0 | 2.1 | 4 | 4 | 3 | 1 | 1 |
| Team totals | 87 | 75 | 3.87 | 162 | 162 | 44 | 1446.1 | 1391 | 722 | 622 | 594 | 1003 |

== Statistical leaders ==
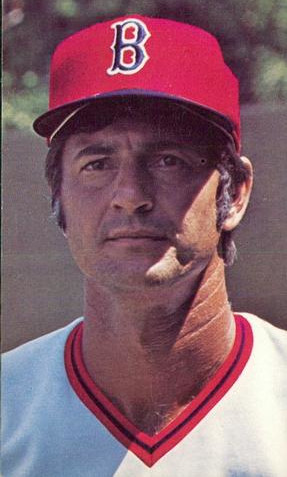
Carl Yastrzemski

| Category | Player | Statistic |
|---|---|---|
| Youngest player | Roger Moret | 20 |
| Oldest player | Ducky Schofield | 35 |
| Wins Above Replacement | Carl Yastrzemski | 9.5 |

=== Batting ===
| Abbr. | Category | Player | Statistic |
|---|---|---|---|
| G | Games played | Carl Yastrzemski | 161 |
| PA | Plate appearances | Carl Yastrzemski | 698 |
| AB | At bats | Mike Andrews | 589 |
| R | Runs scored | Carl Yastrzemski | 125 |
| H | Hits | Carl Yastrzemski | 186 |
| 2B | Doubles | Reggie Smith | 32 |
| 3B | Triples | Reggie Smith | 7 |
| HR | Home runs | Carl Yastrzemski | 40 |
| RBI | Runs batted in | Tony Conigliaro | 116 |
| SB | Stolen bases | Carl Yastrzemski | 23 |
| CS | Caught stealing | Carl Yastrzemski | 13 |
| BB | Base on balls | Carl Yastrzemski | 128 |
| SO | Strikeouts | George Scott | 95 |
| BA | Batting average | Carl Yastrzemski | .329 |
| OBP | On-base percentage | Carl Yastrzemski | .452 |
| SLG | Slugging percentage | Carl Yastrzemski | .592 |
| OPS | On-base plus slugging | Carl Yastrzemski | 1.044 |
| OPS+ | Adjusted OPS | Carl Yastrzemski | 177 |
| TB | Total bases | Carl Yastrzemski | 335 |
| GIDP | Grounded into double play | Rico Petrocelli | 16 |
| HBP | Hit by pitch | Tony Conigliaro | 8 |
| SH | Sacrifice hits | Ray Culp | 5 |
| SF | Sacrifice flies | Rico Petrocelli | 10 |
| IBB | Intentional base on balls | Carl Yastrzemski | 12 |

=== Pitching ===
| Abbr. | Category | Player | Statistic |
|---|---|---|---|
| W | Wins | Ray Culp | 17 |
| L | Losses | Ray Culp | 14 |
| W-L % | Winning percentage | Vicente Romo | .700 (7–3) |
| ERA | Earned run average | Ray Culp | 3.04 |
| G | Games pitched | Sparky Lyle | 63 |
| GS | Games started | Gary Peters | 34 |
| GF | Games finished | Sparky Lyle | 40 |
| CG | Complete games | Ray Culp | 15 |
| SHO | Shutouts | Gary Peters | 4 |
| SV | Saves | Sparky Lyle | 20 |
| IP | Innings pitched | Ray Culp | 251 1/3 |
| SO | Strikeouts | Ray Culp | 197 |
| WHIP | Walks plus hits per inning pitched | Sonny Siebert | 1.199 |

== Awards and honors ==
- Tony Conigliaro, Hutch Award

== Farm system ==
| Level | Team | League | Manager |
|---|---|---|---|
| AAA | Louisville Colonels | International League | Billy Gardner |
| AA | Pawtucket Red Sox | Eastern League | Matt Sczesny |
| A | Winston-Salem Red Sox | Carolina League | Bill Slack |
| A | Winter Haven Red Sox | Florida State League | John Butler |
| A | Greenville Red Sox | Western Carolinas League | Rac Slider |
| A-Short Season | Jamestown Falcons | New York–Penn League | Jackie Jensen |

LEAGUE CHAMPIONS: Winston-Salem, Greenville
