= 1973 Boston Red Sox season =

Major League Baseball season

1973 Boston Red Sox
- League: American League
- Division: East
- Ballpark: Fenway Park
- City: Boston, Massachusetts
- Record: 89–73 (.549)
- Divisional place: 2nd
- Owner: Tom Yawkey
- President: Tom Yawkey
- General manager: Dick O'Connell
- Managers: Eddie Kasko (88–73); Eddie Popowski (1–0)
- Television: WBZ-TV, Ch. 4 (Ken Coleman, Johnny Pesky)
- Radio: WHDH-AM 850 (Ned Martin, Dave Martin)
- Stats: ESPN.com; Baseball Reference

The 1973 Boston Red Sox season was the 73rd season in the franchise's Major League Baseball history. The Red Sox finished second in the American League East with a record of 89 wins and 73 losses, eight games behind the Baltimore Orioles. The team was managed by Eddie Kasko until he was reassigned at the end of September; third-base coach Eddie Popowski managed the team in their final contest of the season.

== Offseason ==
- January 18, 1973: Orlando Cepeda was signed as a free agent by the Red Sox.
- March 27, 1973: Phil Gagliano and Andy Kosco were traded by the Red Sox to the Cincinnati Reds for Mel Behney.

== Regular season ==
Record by month
Month	Record		Cumulative		AL East		Ref.
Month	Won	Lost	Won	Lost	Position	GB	Ref.
April	7	10	7	10	6th	2	
May	13	13	20	23	4th	3 1/2	
June	15	12	35	35	4th	5	
July	19	14	54	49	4th	3 1/2	
August	18	13	72	62	2nd	6	
September	17	11	89	73	2nd	8	

=== Season standings ===
AL East
Team	W	L	Pct.	GB	Home	Road
Baltimore Orioles	97	65	.599	—	50‍–‍31	47‍–‍34
Boston Red Sox	89	73	.549	8	48‍–‍33	41‍–‍40
Detroit Tigers	85	77	.525	12	47‍–‍34	38‍–‍43
New York Yankees	80	82	.494	17	50‍–‍31	30‍–‍51
Milwaukee Brewers	74	88	.457	23	40‍–‍41	34‍–‍47
Cleveland Indians	71	91	.438	26	34‍–‍47	37‍–‍44

=== Record vs. opponents ===
1973 American League record Sources:
Team	BAL	BOS	CAL	CWS	CLE	DET	KC	MIL	MIN	NYY	OAK	TEX
Baltimore	—	7–11	6–6	8–4	12–6	9–9	8–4	15–3	8–4	9–9	5–7	10–2
Boston	11–7	—	7–5	6–6	9–9	3–15	8–4	12–6	6–6	14–4	4–8	9–3
California	6–6	5–7	—	8–10	5–7	7–5	10–8	5–7	10–8	6–6	6–12	11–7
Chicago	4–8	6–6	10–8	—	7–5	5–7	6–12	3–9	9–9	8–4	6–12	13–5
Cleveland	6–12	9–9	7–5	5–7	—	9–9	2–10	9–9	7–5	7–11	3–9	7–5
Detroit	9–9	15–3	5–7	7–5	9–9	—	4–8	12–6	5–7	7–11	7–5	5–7
Kansas City	4–8	4–8	8–10	12–6	10–2	8–4	—	8–4	9–9	6–6	8–10	11–7
Milwaukee	3–15	6–12	7–5	9–3	9–9	6–12	4–8	—	8–4	10–8	4–8	8–4
Minnesota	4–8	6–6	8–10	9–9	5–7	7–5	9–9	4–8	—	3–9	14–4	12–6
New York	9–9	4–14	6–6	4–8	11–7	11–7	6–6	8–10	9–3	—	4–8	8–4
Oakland	7–5	8–4	12–6	12–6	9–3	5–7	10–8	8–4	4–14	8–4	—	11–7
Texas	2–10	3–9	7–11	5–13	5–7	7–5	7–11	4–8	6–12	4–8	7–11	—

=== Opening Day lineup ===
4	Tommy Harper	CF
11	Luis Aparicio	SS
8	Carl Yastrzemski	1B
7	Reggie Smith	CF
25	Orlando Cepeda	DH
6	Rico Petrocelli	3B
27	Carlton Fisk	C
2	Doug Griffin	2B
40	Dwight Evans	RF
23	Luis Tiant	P

=== Roster ===
1973 Boston Red Sox
Roster
Pitchers: 26 Bobby Bolin; 21 Ray Culp; 22 John Curtis; 39 Mike Garman; 37 Bill Lee; 36 Lynn McGlothen; 29 Roger Moret; 28 Don Newhauser; 33 Marty Pattin; 45 Dick Pole; 42 Sonny Siebert; 49 Craig Skok; 19 Ken Tatum; 23 Luis Tiant; 55 Bob Veale	Catchers: 27 Carlton Fisk; 10 Bob Montgomery; Infielders: 11 Luis Aparicio; 5 Danny Cater; 17 Cecil Cooper; 2 Doug Griffin; 18,41 Mario Guerrero; 3,38 Buddy Hunter; 12 John Kennedy; 6 Rico Petrocelli; 8 Carl Yastrzemski	Outfielders: 24,40 Dwight Evans; 4 Tommy Harper; 16 Rick Miller; 14 Ben Oglivie; 7 Reggie Smith; Other batters: 25 Orlando Cepeda	Manager: 30 Eddie Kasko; Coaches: 34 Doug Camilli (Bullpen); 31 Don Lenhardt (First base); 32 Eddie Popowski (Third base); 35 Lee Stange (Pitching)

== Player statistics ==
=== Batting ===
==== Starters by position ====
Note: Pos = Position; G = Games played; AB = At bats; H = Hits; Avg. = Batting average; HR = Home runs; RBI = Runs batted in

Pos	Player	G	AB	H	Avg.	HR	RBI
C	Carlton Fisk	135	508	125	.246	26	71
1B	Carl Yastrzemski	152	540	160	.296	19	95
2B	Doug Griffin	113	396	101	.255	1	33
SS	Luis Aparicio	132	499	135	.271	0	49
3B	Rico Petrocelli	100	356	87	.244	13	45
LF	Tommy Harper	147	566	159	.281	17	71
CF	Reggie Smith	115	423	128	.303	21	69
RF	Dwight Evans	119	282	63	.223	10	32
DH	Orlando Cepeda	142	550	159	.289	20	86

==== Other batters ====
Note: G = Games played; AB = At bats; H = Hits; Avg. = Batting average; HR = Home runs; RBI = Runs batted in

Player	G	AB	H	Avg.	HR	RBI
Rick Miller	143	441	115	.261	6	43
Mario Guerrero	66	219	51	.233	0	11
Danny Cater	63	195	61	.313	1	24
John Kennedy	67	155	28	.181	1	16
Ben Oglivie	58	147	32	.218	2	9
Bob Montgomery	34	128	41	.320	7	25
Cecil Cooper	30	101	24	.238	3	11
Buddy Hunter	13	7	3	.429	0	2

=== Pitching ===
==== Starting pitchers ====
Note: G = Games pitched; IP = Innings pitched; W = Wins; L = Losses; ERA = Earned run average; SO = Strikeouts

Player	G	IP	W	L	ERA	SO
Bill Lee	38	284.2	17	11	2.75	120
Luis Tiant	35	272.0	20	13	3.34	206
John Curtis	35	221.1	13	13	3.58	101
Marty Pattin	34	219.1	15	15	4.31	119
Ray Culp	10	50.1	2	6	4.47	32

==== Other pitchers ====
Note: G = Games pitched; IP = Innings pitched; W = Wins; L = Losses; ERA = Earned run average; SO = Strikeouts

Player	G	IP	W	L	ERA	SO
Roger Moret	30	156.1	13	2	3.17	90
Dick Pole	12	54.2	3	2	5.60	24
Lynn McGlothen	6	23.0	1	2	8.22	16

==== Relief pitchers ====
Note: G = Games pitched; W = Wins; L = Losses; SV = Saves; ERA = Earned run average; SO = Strikeouts

Player	G	W	L	SV	ERA	SO
Bobby Bolin	39	3	4	15	2.70	31
Bob Veale	32	2	3	11	3.47	25
Mike Garman	12	0	0	0	5.32	9
Craig Skok	11	0	1	1	6.28	22
Don Newhauser	9	0	0	1	0.00	8
Sonny Siebert	2	0	1	0	7.71	5
Ken Tatum	1	0	0	0	9.00	0

== Statistical leaders ==
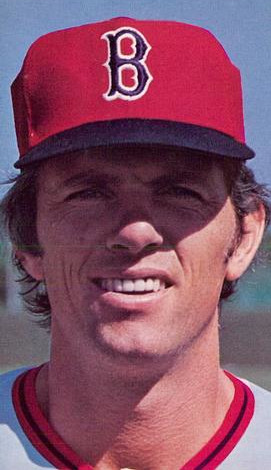
Bill Lee

Category	Player	Statistic
Youngest player	Dwight Evans	21
Oldest player	Luis Aparicio	39
Wins Above Replacement	Bill Lee	6.1

=== Batting ===
Abbr.	Category	Player	Statistic
G	Games played	Carl Yastrzemski	152
PA	Plate appearances	Carl Yastrzemski	652
AB	At bats	Tommy Harper	566
R	Runs scored	Tommy Harper	92
H	Hits	Carl Yastrzemski	160
2B	Doubles	Orlando Cepeda	25
2B	Doubles	Carl Yastrzemski	25
3B	Triples	Rick Miller	7
HR	Home runs	Carlton Fisk	26
RBI	Runs batted in	Carl Yastrzemski	95
SB	Stolen bases	Tommy Harper	54
CS	Caught stealing	Tommy Harper	14
BB	Base on balls	Carl Yastrzemski	105
SO	Strikeouts	Carlton Fisk	99
BA	Batting average	Carl Yastrzemski	.296
OBP	On-base percentage	Carl Yastrzemski	.407
SLG	Slugging percentage	Reggie Smith	.515
OPS	On-base plus slugging	Reggie Smith	.913
OPS+	Adjusted OPS	Reggie Smith	150
TB	Total bases	Carl Yastrzemski	250
GIDP	Grounded into double play	Orlando Cepeda	24
HBP	Hit by pitch	Carlton Fisk	10
SH	Sacrifice hits	Doug Griffin	13
SF	Sacrifice flies	Luis Aparicio	7
IBB	Intentional base on balls	Orlando Cepeda	13
IBB	Intentional base on balls	Carl Yastrzemski	13

=== Pitching ===
Abbr.	Category	Player	Statistic
W	Wins	Luis Tiant	20
L	Losses	Marty Pattin	15
W-L %	Winning percentage	Roger Moret	.867 (13–2)
ERA	Earned run average	Bob Bolin	2.70
G	Games pitched	Bob Bolin	39
GS	Games started	Luis Tiant	35
GF	Games finished	Bob Bolin	29
CG	Complete games	Luis Tiant	23
SHO	Shutouts	John Curtis	4
SV	Saves	Bob Bolin	15
IP	Innings pitched	Bill Lee	284 2/3
SO	Strikeouts	Luis Tiant	206
WHIP	Walks plus hits per inning pitched	Luis Tiant	1.085

== Farm system ==
Level	Team	League	Manager
AAA	Pawtucket Red Sox	International League	Darrell Johnson
AA	Bristol Red Sox	Eastern League	Rac Slider
A	Winston-Salem Red Sox	Carolina League	Bill Slack
A	Winter Haven Red Sox	Florida State League	Al Lehrer
A-Short Season	Elmira Pioneers	New York–Penn League	Dick Berardino

LEAGUE CHAMPIONS: Pawtucket, Winston-Salem
