= 1969 Boston Red Sox season =

Major League Baseball season

1969 Boston Red Sox
- League: American League
- Division: East
- Ballpark: Fenway Park
- City: Boston, Massachusetts
- Record: 87–75 (.537)
- Divisional place: 3rd
- Owner: Tom Yawkey
- President: Tom Yawkey
- General manager: Dick O'Connell
- Managers: Dick Williams (82–71); Eddie Popowski (5–4)
- Television: WHDH-TV, Ch. 5
- Radio: WHDH-AM 850 (Ken Coleman, Ned Martin, Johnny Pesky)
- Stats: ESPN.com; Baseball Reference

The 1969 Boston Red Sox season was the 69th season in the franchise's Major League Baseball history. With the American League (AL) now split into two divisions, the Red Sox finished third in the newly established American League East with a record of 87 wins and 75 losses, 22 games behind the Baltimore Orioles, who went on to win the AL championship.

Dick Williams, who had managed the team to the 1967 AL pennant, was fired on September 23; coach Eddie Popowski led the team for the final nine games of the season.

== Offseason ==
- October 15, 1968: Joe Foy was drafted by the Kansas City Royals from the Boston Red Sox as the 4th pick in the 1968 expansion draft.
- March 18, 1969: Bill Kelso was purchased by the Red Sox from the Cincinnati Reds.
- March 29, 1969: Bill Kelso was returned to the Reds by the Red Sox.

== Regular season ==
Record by month
Month	Record		Cumulative		AL East		Ref.
Month	Won	Lost	Won	Lost	Position	GB	Ref.
April	11	9	11	9	2nd	3 1/2	
May	18	7	29	16	2nd	3	
June	14	15	43	31	2nd	11	
July	14	15	57	46	3rd	15	
August	13	15	70	61	3rd	19 1/2	
September	17	13	87	74	3rd	21	
October	0	1	87	75	3rd	22	

=== Season standings ===
AL East
Team	W	L	Pct.	GB	Home	Road
Baltimore Orioles	109	53	.673	—	60‍–‍21	49‍–‍32
Detroit Tigers	90	72	.556	19	46‍–‍35	44‍–‍37
Boston Red Sox	87	75	.537	22	46‍–‍35	41‍–‍40
Washington Senators	86	76	.531	23	47‍–‍34	39‍–‍42
New York Yankees	80	81	.497	28½	48‍–‍32	32‍–‍49
Cleveland Indians	62	99	.385	46½	33‍–‍48	29‍–‍51

=== Record vs. opponents ===
1969 American League records Sources:
Team	BAL	BOS	CAL	CWS	CLE	DET	KC	MIN	NYY	OAK	SEA	WAS
Baltimore	—	10–8	6–6	9–3	13–5	11–7	11–1	8–4	11–7	8–4	9–3	13–5
Boston	8–10	—	8–4	5–7	12–6	10–8	10–2	7–5	11–7	4–8	6–6	6–12
California	6–6	4–8	—	9–9	8–4	5–7	9–9	7–11	3–9	6–12	9–9–1	5–7
Chicago	3–9	7–5	9–9	—	8–4	3–9	8–10	5–13	3–9	8–10	10–8	4–8
Cleveland	5–13	6–12	4–8	4–8	—	7–11	7–5	5–7	9–8	5–7	7–5	3–15
Detroit	7–11	8–10	7–5	9–3	11–7	—	8–4	6–6	10–8	7–5	10–2	7–11
Kansas City	1–11	2–10	9–9	10–8	5–7	4–8	—	8–10	5–7–1	8–10	10–8	7–5
Minnesota	4–8	5–7	11–7	13–5	7–5	6–6	10–8	—	10–2	13–5	12–6	6–6
New York	7–11	7–11	9–3	9–3	8–9	8–10	7–5–1	2–10	—	6–6	7–5	10–8
Oakland	4–8	8–4	12–6	10–8	7–5	5–7	10–8	5–13	6–6	—	13–5	8–4
Seattle	3–9	6–6	9–9–1	8–10	5–7	2–10	8–10	6–12	5–7	5–13	—	7–5
Washington	5–13	12–6	7–5	8–4	15–3	11–7	5–7	6–6	8–10	4–8	5–7	—

=== Notable transactions ===
- April 19, 1969: Dick Ellsworth, Ken Harrelson and Juan Pizarro were traded by the Red Sox to the Cleveland Indians for Joe Azcue, Vicente Romo and Sonny Siebert.
- June 15, 1969: Joe Azcue was traded by the Red Sox to the California Angels for Tom Satriano.

=== Opening Day lineup ===
7	Reggie Smith	CF
2	Mike Andrews	2B
8	Carl Yastrzemski	LF
40	Ken Harrelson	1B
25	Tony Conigliaro	RF
5	George Scott	3B
6	Rico Petrocelli	SS
35	Russ Gibson	C
16	Jim Lonborg	P

=== Roster ===
1969 Boston Red Sox
Roster
Pitchers: 15 Ken Brett; 21 Ray Culp; 36 Dick Ellsworth; 39 Mike Garman; 17 Ray Jarvis; 26 Ron Kline; 29 Bill Landis; 37 Bill Lee; 16 Jim Lonborg; 28 Sparky Lyle; 15 Mike Nagy; 24 Juan Pizarro; 37 Garry Roggenburk; 24 Vicente Romo; 30 José Santiago; 27 Sonny Siebert; 20 Lee Stange; 41 Gary Wagner; 24 Fred Wenz	Catchers: 1 Joe Azcue; 40 Carlton Fisk; 35 Russ Gibson; 10 Jerry Moses; 4 Tom Satriano; Infielders: 1 Luis Alvarado; 2 Mike Andrews; 40 Ken Harrelson; 3 Dalton Jones; 43 Tony Muser; 19 Syd O'Brien; 6 Rico Petrocelli; 11 Ducky Schofield; 5 George Scott	Outfielders: 4 Billy Conigliaro; 25 Tony Conigliaro; 14 Joe Lahoud; 18 Don Lock; 7 Reggie Smith; 22 George Thomas; 8 Carl Yastrzemski	Managers: 32 Eddie Popowski; 23 Dick Williams; Coaches: 31 Bobby Doerr (First base & Hitting); 33 Darrell Johnson (Pitching); 34 Al Lakeman (Bullpen); 32 Eddie Popowski (Third base); 22 George Thomas (Bullpen)

== Player stats ==
=== Batting ===
Note: G = Games played; AB = At bats; R = Runs; H = Hits; 2B = Doubles; 3B = Triples; HR = Home runs; RBI = Runs batted in; SB = Stolen bases; BB = Walks; AVG = Batting average; SLG = Slugging average

Player	G	AB	R	H	2B	3B	HR	RBI	SB	BB	AVG	SLG
Carl Yastrzemski	162	603	96	154	28	2	40	111	15	101	.255	.507
George Scott	152	549	63	139	14	5	16	52	4	61	.253	.384
Reggie Smith	143	543	87	168	29	7	25	93	7	54	.309	.527
Rico Petrocelli	154	535	92	159	32	2	40	97	3	98	.297	.589
Tony Conigliaro	141	506	57	129	21	3	20	82	2	48	.255	.427
Mike Andrews	121	464	79	136	26	2	15	59	1	71	.293	.455
Dalton Jones	111	336	50	74	18	3	3	33	1	39	.220	.318
Russ Gibson	85	287	21	72	9	1	3	27	1	15	.251	.321
Syd O'Brien	100	263	47	64	10	5	9	29	2	15	.243	.422
Ducky Schofield	94	226	30	58	9	3	2	20	0	29	.257	.350
Joe Lahoud	101	218	32	41	5	0	9	21	2	40	.188	.335
Jerry Moses	53	135	13	41	9	1	4	17	0	5	.304	.474
Tom Satriano	47	127	9	24	2	0	0	11	0	22	.189	.205
Billy Conigliaro	32	80	14	23	6	2	4	7	1	9	.288	.563
Don Lock	53	58	8	13	1	0	1	2	0	11	.224	.293
George Thomas	29	51	9	18	3	1	0	8	0	3	.353	.451
Joe Azcue	19	51	7	11	2	0	0	3	0	4	.216	.255
Ken Harrelson	10	46	6	10	1	0	3	8	0	4	.217	.435
Tony Muser	2	9	0	1	0	0	0	1	0	1	.111	.111
Carlton Fisk	2	5	0	0	0	0	0	0	0	0	.000	.000
Luis Alvarado	6	5	0	0	0	0	0	0	0	0	.000	.000
Pitcher totals	162	397	23	46	9	0	3	20	2	28	.116	.161
Team totals	162	5494	743	1381	234	37	197	701	41	658	.251	.415

=== Pitching ===
Note: W = Wins; L = Losses; ERA = Earned run average; G = Games pitched; GS = Games started; SV = Saves; IP = Innings pitched; H = Hits allowed; R = Runs allowed; ER = Earned runs allowed; BB = Walks allowed; SO = Strikeouts

Player	W	L	ERA	G	GS	SV	IP	H	R	ER	BB	SO
Ray Culp	17	8	3.81	32	32	0	227.0	195	103	96	79	172
Mike Nagy	12	2	3.11	33	28	0	196.2	183	84	68	106	84
Sonny Siebert	14	10	3.80	43	22	5	163.1	151	93	69	68	127
Jim Lonborg	7	11	4.51	29	23	0	143.2	148	78	72	65	100
Lee Stange	6	9	3.68	41	15	3	137.0	137	70	56	56	59
Vicente Romo	7	9	3.18	52	11	11	127.1	116	51	45	50	89
Sparky Lyle	8	3	2.54	71	0	17	102.2	91	33	29	48	93
Ray Jarvis	5	6	4.75	29	12	1	100.1	105	59	53	43	36
Bill Landis	5	5	5.25	45	5	1	82.1	82	53	48	49	50
Bill Lee	1	3	4.50	20	1	0	52.0	56	27	26	28	45
Ken Brett	2	3	5.26	8	8	0	39.1	41	24	23	22	23
Ron Kline	0	1	4.76	16	0	1	17.0	24	11	9	17	7
Gary Wagner	1	3	6.06	6	1	0	16.1	18	11	11	15	9
Mike Garman	1	0	4.38	2	2	0	12.1	13	6	6	10	10
Dick Ellsworth	0	0	3.75	2	2	0	12.0	16	5	5	4	4
Fred Wenz	1	0	5.73	8	0	0	11.0	9	7	7	10	11
Garry Roggenburk	0	1	8.38	7	0	0	9.2	13	9	9	5	8
Juan Pizarro	0	1	6.00	6	0	2	9.0	14	7	6	6	4
José Santiago	0	0	3.52	10	0	0	7.2	11	5	3	4	4
Team totals	87	75	3.92	162	162	41	1466.2	1423	736	639	685	935

== Statistical leaders ==
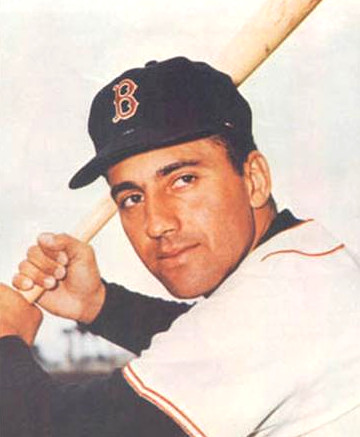
Rico Petrocelli

Category	Player	Statistic
Youngest player	Mike Garman	19
Oldest player	Ron Kline	37
Wins Above Replacement	Rico Petrocelli	10.0

=== Batting ===
Abbr.	Category	Player	Statistic
G	Games played	Carl Yastrzemski	162
PA	Plate appearances	Carl Yastrzemski	707
AB	At bats	Carl Yastrzemski	603
R	Runs scored	Carl Yastrzemski	96
H	Hits	Reggie Smith	168
2B	Doubles	Rico Petrocelli	32
3B	Triples	Reggie Smith	7
HR	Home runs	Rico Petrocelli	40
HR	Home runs	Carl Yastrzemski	40
RBI	Runs batted in	Carl Yastrzemski	111
SB	Stolen bases	Carl Yastrzemski	15
CS	Caught stealing	Reggie Smith	13
BB	Base on balls	Carl Yastrzemski	101
SO	Strikeouts	Tony Conigliaro	111
BA	Batting average	Reggie Smith	.309
OBP	On-base percentage	Rico Petrocelli	.403
SLG	Slugging percentage	Rico Petrocelli	.589
OPS	On-base plus slugging	Rico Petrocelli	.992
OPS+	Adjusted OPS	Rico Petrocelli	168
TB	Total bases	Rico Petrocelli	315
GIDP	Grounded into double play	George Scott	15
HBP	Hit by pitch	Mike Andrews	5
SH	Sacrifice hits	Mike Andrews	10
SF	Sacrifice flies	Reggie Smith	8
IBB	Intentional base on balls	Rico Petrocelli	13

=== Pitching ===
Abbr.	Category	Player	Statistic
W	Wins	Ray Culp	17
L	Losses	Jim Lonborg	11
W-L %	Winning percentage	Mike Nagy	.857 (12–2)
ERA	Earned run average	Mike Nagy	3.11
G	Games pitched	Sparky Lyle	71
GS	Games started	Ray Culp	32
GF	Games finished	Sparky Lyle	44
CG	Complete games	Ray Culp	9
SHO	Shutouts	Ray Culp	2
SV	Saves	Sparky Lyle	17
IP	Innings pitched	Ray Culp	227
SO	Strikeouts	Ray Culp	172
WHIP	Walks plus hits per inning pitched	Ray Culp	1.207

== Awards and honors ==
- Carl Yastrzemski, Gold Glove Award (OF)

== Farm system ==
Level	Team	League	Manager
AAA	Louisville Colonels	International League	Eddie Kasko
AA	Pittsfield Red Sox	Eastern League	Billy Gardner
A	Winston-Salem Red Sox	Carolina League	Matt Sczesny
A	Winter Haven Red Sox	Florida State League	Rac Slider
A	Greenville Red Sox	Western Carolinas League	Bill Slack
A-Short Season	Jamestown Falcons	New York–Penn League	Jackie Moore
