= Greenville Red Sox =

The Greenville Red Sox was the name of an American minor league baseball franchise representing Greenville, South Carolina, that played for five seasons, 1967–1971, in the Class A Western Carolinas League. It played its home games at Meadowbrook Park.

Greenville was represented in the WCL from 1963–1972, taking its nicknames from its various parent organizations. When the New York Mets vacated Greenville after the 1966 season, the Boston Red Sox, seeking to replace the Oneonta Red Sox as its third full-season Class A farm club, took the Mets' place. The Greenville Red Sox produced future Major League Baseball players such as Rick Burleson, Cecil Cooper, Billy Conigliaro, John Curtis, Bo Díaz, Dwight Evans, Mike Garman, Mike Nagy, Don Newhauser, Ben Oglivie and Dick Pole during their five years of existence. The team won one league championship, in 1970. Attendance ranged between 41,000 and 59,000 — in the middle to lower tier of WCL franchises of the time.

When Red Sox decided to trim their farm system for 1972 — they had two other full-season Class A affiliates, the Winston-Salem Red Sox and the Winter Haven Red Sox — the Texas Rangers replaced them in Greenville, and renamed the team to the Greenville Rangers. The Boston club returned to Greenville in 2005 and has a Player Development Contract with the Greenville Drive, which plays in the South Atlantic League, the successor to the WCL.

Year	Record	Finish	Attendance	Manager
1967	59-61	Third	43,053	Matt Sczesny
1968	68-54	Third	59,368	Matt Sczesny
1969	56-68	Sixth	52,991	Bill Slack
1970	77-52	First	46,245	Rac Slider
1971	62-63	Third	41,402	Rac Slider
