= 1972 Major League Baseball strike =

First players' strike in Major League Baseball history

The 1972 Major League Baseball strike was the first players' strike in Major League Baseball history. The strike occurred from April 1 to 13, 1972.

Baseball resumed when the owners and players agreed on a $500,000 increase in pension fund payments. Owners agreed to add salary arbitration to the Collective Bargaining Agreement. The 86 total games that were missed over the 13-day period were not rescheduled because the league refused to pay the players for the time they were on strike. As a result, the Houston Astros and San Diego Padres each played only 153 games, nine fewer than normal, and no team played more than 156 games.

One major effect of the uneven schedule was that the Detroit Tigers played one more game than the Boston Red Sox, which enabled Detroit (with a record of 86–70) to win the American League East as Boston (with a record of 85–70) finished 1/2 game behind. Detroit won the division on the next-to-last day of the season when they beat Boston, 3–1, at Tiger Stadium.

== See also ==
- 1972 Major League Baseball season
