= Don Newhauser =

American baseball player (born 1947)

- Pitcher
- Born: November 7, 1947 (age 78); Miami, Florida, U.S.
- Batted: Right Threw: Right

MLB debut
- June 15, 1972, for the Boston Red Sox

Last MLB appearance
- July 13, 1974, for the Boston Red Sox

MLB statistics
- Win–loss record: 4–3
- Earned run average: 2.39
- Strikeouts: 37
- Stats at Baseball Reference

Teams
- Boston Red Sox (1972–1974)

Donald Louis Newhauser (born November 7, 1947) is an American former professional baseball pitcher. He played in Major League Baseball (MLB) for the Boston Red Sox from 1972 to 1974. Listed at 6 feet 4 inches (1.93 m) and 200 pounds (91 kg), he threw and batted right-handed.

== Biography ==
Newhauser played high school baseball for Monsignor Edward Pace High School in Miami Gardens, Florida. He then played college baseball at Broward Community College. He was selected by the Boston Red Sox in the second round of the 1967 MLB draft.

Newhauser began his professional baseball career in 1967 with the Greenville Red Sox, a Red Sox farm team in the Western Carolinas League. He reached the Triple-A level in 1971, with the Louisville Colonels.

The following season, Newhauser made his MLB debut in June, and appeared 31 games (all in relief) with the 1972 Red Sox, compiling a 4–2 record with a 2.43 earned run average (ERA) while recording 27 strikeouts in 37 innings pitched. Newhauser only made 11 more major league appearances; nine games in 1973 and two games in 1974. Overall, he made 42 major league appearances, all in relief with the Red Sox, registering a 2.39 ERA and 37 strikeouts in 52 2/3 innings pitched with a 4–3 record.

Newhauser pitched in Minor League Baseball for the Red Sox organization through 1975, then finished his career in 1976 with the Charleston Charlies, a Triple-A affiliate of the Pittsburgh Pirates. He appeared in a total of 321 minor league games in parts of 10 seasons.
