= Lew Krausse Jr. =

American baseball player (1943–2021)

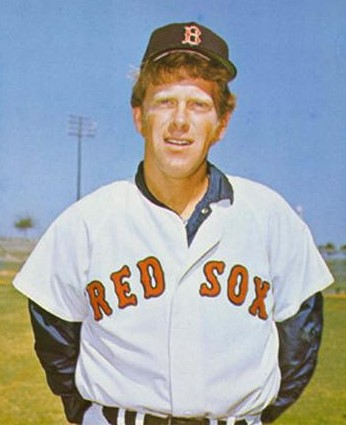
- Pitcher
- Born: April 25, 1943; Media, Pennsylvania, U.S.
- Died: February 16, 2021 (aged 77); Kansas City, Missouri, U.S.
- Batted: Right Threw: Right

MLB debut
- June 16, 1961, for the Kansas City Athletics

Last MLB appearance
- September 23, 1974, for the Atlanta Braves

MLB statistics
- Win–loss record: 68–91
- Earned run average: 4.00
- Strikeouts: 721
- Stats at Baseball Reference

Teams
- Kansas City / Oakland Athletics (1961, 1964–1969); Milwaukee Brewers (1970–1971); Boston Red Sox (1972); St. Louis Cardinals (1973); Atlanta Braves (1974)

Lewis Bernard Krausse Jr. (April 25, 1943 – February 16, 2021) was an American professional baseball pitcher who played 12 seasons in Major League Baseball (MLB). He played for the Kansas City / Oakland Athletics, Milwaukee Brewers, Boston Red Sox, St. Louis Cardinals, and Atlanta Braves from 1961 to 1974. He batted and threw right-handed and served primarily as a starting pitcher. Once a highly touted prospect, he had to overcome arm trouble early in his career and spent most of his career with teams that offered low run support.

Krausse was the son of a former Philadelphia Athletics pitcher who remained with the organization as a scout after it moved to Kansas City. Signed to a $125,000 contract following his graduation from high school in 1961, he pitched a shutout in his first MLB start on June 16 of that year. Arm trouble threatened his career after that, and it was not until 1966 that he became a regular in the major leagues. He won 14 games with the Athletics that year, the most he would ever win in a season. In 1967, he had a bitter disagreement with team owner Charlie Finley concerning the pitcher's activities on a team flight; the rift led to the firing of manager Alvin Dark and the release of first baseman Ken Harrelson. In 1968, he started the first game at the Oakland-Alameda County Coliseum after the Athletics moved to California. Two years later, he started the first game in Milwaukee Brewers history, pitching the team's first shutout in the same year. He pitched for Boston in 1972, St. Louis in 1973, and Atlanta in 1974, then spent a year in the minor leagues before retiring. Following his baseball career, Krausse and partners started a metal business in the Kansas City area, which Krausse remained involved in from 1983 to 1997.

== Early life ==
Krausse was born in Media, Pennsylvania, on April 25, 1943. His father, Lew Sr., pitched for the Philadelphia Athletics from 1931 until 1932, and became a scout for the organization in 1957, after they had moved to Kansas City. Krausse Jr. attended Chester High School in Pennsylvania, graduating in 1961. He pitched 18 no-hitters while playing in amateur baseball, piquing the interest of several teams across the country. He was signed as an amateur free agent by the Kansas City Athletics on June 8, 1961, several hours after graduating from high school. The Athletics gave him a $125,000 bonus contract that also included a guarantee that the young pitcher would have a chance to pitch in the majors that season.

== Career ==
=== Kansas City / Oakland Athletics (1961–1969) ===
==== High school phenom (1961) ====
Just over a week after signing, at the age of 18, Krausse made his major league debut when he started a game against the expansion Los Angeles Angels in Kansas City's Municipal Stadium on June 16. He pitched a three-hit shutout in his major league debut, defeating Los Angeles 4–0. Krausse was the youngest player in the major leagues that season. Though the Athletics were on their way to losing 100 games, Krausse stimulated their attendance. "We packed the park the first four times [Lew] pitched for us and probably got our money back," recalled team owner Charlie Finley.

Krausse was less successful in his next starts for Kansas City, partly because he was walking too many batters. After the shutout, he lost five starts in a row. He did not win again until his final outing of the year, when he held the Washington Senators to two runs in a complete game, 3–2 victory on September 17. In 12 games (eight starts), he had a 2–5 record, a 4.85 earned run average (ERA), 32 strikeouts, 46 walks, and 49 hits allowed in 55 2/3 innings.

==== Minor leagues, arm trouble (1962–1965) ====
In 1962, Krausse was assigned to the Binghamton Triplets of the Class A Eastern League. Facing the Elmira Pioneers in his first start on April 25, he struck out 16 batters in a 4–3 victory. However, he was bothered for most of the season by a sore right elbow, which caused the team to shut him down in July, with two months remaining in the minor league season. In 12 starts, he had a 6–4 record, a 3.81 ERA, 78 strikeouts, 38 walks, and 73 hits allowed in 78 innings. That November, Krausse had his elbow examined at the Mayo Clinic, as it was uncertain whether he would ever be able to pitch again. He had to undergo offseason surgery but was able to return to pitching in 1963.

Assigned to the Class AAA Portland Beavers of the Pacific Coast League (PCL) in 1963, Krausse struggled in the first part of the season but pitched very well in the second half, showing better command of his pitches. In 28 games (27 starts), he had a 13–12 record, a 4.22 ERA, 115 strikeouts, 87 walks, and 180 hits allowed in 177 innings. His 13 wins led the Beavers.

Krausse opened 1964 with the Athletics but did not make his first appearance until two weeks into the season, when he allowed three runs and failed to get out of the first inning, taking the loss in a 7–4 loss to the Senators on April 26. The next day, he was sent back to Class AAA with Kansas City's new affiliate, the PCL's Dallas Rangers. In 31 games (27 starts), he had a 7–19 record, a 3.94 ERA, 135 strikeouts, 74 walks, and 201 hits allowed in 192 innings pitched. His 19 losses led the PCL, but this was partly due to low run support from the Dallas hitters. The Rangers were the lowest-scoring team in the league; sportswriter Bob Franklin quipped that "The Texans at times couldn't have bought a run if Billy Sol Estes was the plate umpire". Krausse rejoined the Athletics in September and appeared in four more games before the end of the year. In five games (four starts), he had an 0–2 record, 7.36 ERA, nine strikeouts, nine walks, and 22 hits allowed in 14 2/3 innings.

The Athletics used their final option on Krausse before the 1965 season, sending him to the PCL's Vancouver Mounties. In 23 starts, he had a 12–7 record, a 3.22 ERA, 116 strikeouts, 46 walks, and 153 hits allowed in 162 innings. Kansas City recalled him on August 14, and he started for them on August 17, allowing two runs in 6 2/3 innings and earning the victory in a 3–2 triumph over the Cleveland Indians. On September 3, he held the California Angels scoreless for 7 1/3 innings in a 1–0 victory in the second game of a doubleheader. In seven games (five starts), he had a 2–4 record, a 5.04 ERA, 22 strikeouts, eight walks, and 29 hits allowed in 25 innings. After the season, he played winter ball for the Leones del Caracas, where he struck out 21 players in a single game, setting the Venezuelan Winter League record. Encouraged by his performance, Athletics general manager Eddie Lopat remarked, "He has shown a lot more maturity … [and] has a chance to be an outstanding pitcher."

==== Career high in wins (1966) ====
During 1966 spring training, Athletics manager Alvin Dark encouraged Krausse to throw his changeup when a batter had more balls than strikes, an approach Krausse credited with improving his confidence in the pitch. He began the season as a relief pitcher. On May 27, he was the victim of a practical joke pulled by ex-teammate Moe Drabowsky. Now pitching for the Baltimore Orioles, Drabowsky phoned the bullpen at Municipal Stadium, imitating Dark's voice. He ordered Krausse to warm up, then sit down again. Not until the third call did someone recognize his voice. "You should've seen them scramble, trying to get Lew Krausse warmed up in a hurry," Drabowsky said. "It was really funny." In 14 games through June 11, Krausse recorded three saves in five opportunities and posted a 3.07 ERA. When Rollie Sheldon was traded to the Boston Red Sox on June 13, Krausse took his spot in the starting rotation. Two days later, in his first start of the year, Krausse held the Chicago White Sox to three runs over seven innings, earning the victory in a 5–4 triumph. Four days after that, he held the Angels to six hits and no runs in a complete game, 1–0 victory. Krausse won five of his first six starts, posting a 2.56 ERA in that span.

Facing the Yankees in the second start of a doubleheader on August 19, Krausse held them scoreless for eight innings and earned the win in a 1–0 victory. On September 2, he held the Red Sox to one run (unearned) in a complete game, 5–1 victory. He was pitching a scoreless game against the Senators on September 16 when a transformer fire caused half of the D. C. Stadium lights to go out, suspending the game for two days. Resuming his spot on the mound on Sunday, Krausse left with 7 1/3 scoreless innings pitched, earning the win in the 1–0 triumph. In 36 games (22 starts), he had a 14–9 record with a 2.99 ERA, setting a career high in wins despite pitching for a team with one of the poorest offenses in the AL. That season, his victory total was tied with four other pitchers for sixth best in the AL, and his 2.99 ERA was ninth best. He had 87 strikeouts, 63 walks, and 144 hits allowed in 177 2/3 innings.

==== Disagreement with Finley (1967) ====
Krausse did not have a good year in 1967, partly due to personal problems. After a 2–7 start to the season, he was moved to the bullpen following his May 27 outing. He rejoined the rotation on June 6 but was used exclusively out of the bullpen after a July 30 start. During the season, Krausse's mother suffered a fatal heart attack. On July 7, Krausse allegedly fired a .38 caliber pistol from Kansas City's Bellerive Hotel into an empty office in the Phillips Petroleum building, though the police never filed charges because of insufficient evidence.

On August 18, Finley fined Krausse $500 for his behavior on a team flight, suspending him as well. Dark believed, after talking to several of the other players, that Krausse had been playing pranks on Athletics broadcaster Monte Moore, who then falsely reported to Finley that Krausse used "deplorable language" when speaking to a pregnant woman on the flight. When Dark refused to enforce the suspension, Finley summoned him to his Washington, D.C. hotel room during an Athletics road series against the Senators. In a seven-hour meeting, Finley fired his manager, decided to rehire him, then fired him again when he was presented with a player's statement backing Dark and criticizing Finley's use of spies to keep tabs on the players. Finley also released first baseman Ken Harrelson, who had stood up for Krausse, prompting Harrelson to dub Finley "a menace to the sport". The suspension was quickly lifted, and Krausse was back to pitching for the Athletics on August 23. He said that the suspension had been justified, then later claimed that Finley had intimidated him into voicing his support for the suspension. Players' Association director Marvin Miller lodged a complaint with the National Labor Relations Board, but the complaint was withdrawn when the Athletics agreed to cancel Krausse's suspension. Still forced to pay the fine, Krausse demanded a trade, as did fellow pitchers Jack Aker and Jim Nash. However, Krausse would remain with the Athletics for two more seasons. In a career-high 48 games (19 starts), he had a 7–17 record, six saves, a 4.28 ERA, 96 strikeouts, 67 walks, and 140 hits allowed in 160 inning pitched. His 17 losses tied with teammates Catfish Hunter and Jim Nash for third in the AL, behind George Brunet's 19 and Steve Barber's 18.

==== Oakland (1968–1969) ====
Despite his disagreements with Finley, Krausse became the first Athletic to sign his 1968 contract that January. He said his offseason job as a dockworker in Chester influenced his decision. "[It] just made me realize how good a life baseball is. … [i]t gave me a different outlook." Former teammate Bill Stafford taught him a slider, which Krausse started throwing that year. He began the year in the starting rotation. The Athletics had moved to Oakland, California, following the 1967 season, and Krausse started the first game at the Oakland-Alameda County Coliseum on April 17, allowing four runs in 5 1/3 innings and taking the loss in a 4–1 defeat to the Orioles. He lost six of his first seven starts and was 2–7 through June 16, but he followed that by winning four straight decisions through July 13. After the month of July, he was moved to the bullpen as the Athletics went from a five-man rotation to a four-man rotation. "I was mad," Krausse described his initial reaction to the demotion, but he cheered up after winning three of his first five relief appearances and saving the other two. Beginning August 23, he was used mainly as a starter the rest of the season. In 36 games (25 starts), he had a 10–11 record, four saves, a 3.11 ERA, 105 strikeouts, 62 walks, and 147 hits allowed in 185 innings.

In 1969, Krausse became the team's closer, as the team sought to give prospect Rollie Fingers a spot in the starting rotation. Krausse's spring training was interrupted when his father had a non-fatal heart attack. Because the Athletics starters threw several complete games early in the year, Krausse was seldom used. He requested a trade in June, saying "I want to be traded. I could be a starter for any other team in the league. Minneapolis, Cleveland, Boston – these are the teams I'd like to go to." In 23 games through June, he had a 1–3 record and a 5.59 ERA.

Krausse returned to the rotation in July when Nash was moved to the bullpen to regain his strength after suffering arm trouble. After going 1–1 in his first two starts, he won four consecutive starts, beginning with a shutout of the Angels on July 11. He threw another shutout on August 15, holding the Detroit Tigers to four hits in a 4–0 victory. However, Krausse won no more games that season and was moved back to the bullpen in mid-September. In 43 games (16 starts), he had a 7–7 record, a career-high seven saves, a 4.44 ERA, 85 strikeouts, 48 walks, and 134 hits in 140 innings. Offensively, he hit four home runs during the season.

=== Milwaukee Brewers (1970–1971) ===
On January 15, 1970, Krausse was dealt to the Seattle Pilots with Ken Sanders, Phil Roof, and Mike Hershberger in exchange for Don Mincher and Ron Clark. He initially threatened not to report, but he changed his mind when he realized he was more likely to start games for the organization. Ultimately, he never pitched in Seattle, as the team became the Milwaukee Brewers prior to the start of the regular season. On April 7, he started the first game in Brewers history, allowing four runs in three innings and taking the loss in a 12–0 defeat to the Angels at Milwaukee County Stadium. On July 7, he pitched the first shutout in Brewers' history, defeating the White Sox 1–0. The shutout was part of six straight wins Krausse recorded from June 25 through July 24, as he improved his record to 10–10. However, he was only 3–8 for the rest of the season. Run support did not aid Krausse, as the Brewers scored just 613 runs, two away from being the lowest total in the AL. He set career highs in several categories, such as games started (35), innings (216), and strikeouts (130). However, his 18 losses were second only to Mickey Lolich's 19 in the AL. Krausse's ERA was 4.75.

Krausse opened 1971 as the number two starter in the Brewers' rotation, behind Marty Pattin. On May 1, he allowed five hits and no runs in eight innings, earning his first win of the season in a 1–0 victory over the Yankees. With only a 2–8 record in June, Krausse said, "I'm sick and tired of this. I can't take pitching like this any longer getting no runs." He threatened retirement and said that he and his fellow Brewers starters would have more wins than the pitchers for the Orioles were they members of the eventual World Series champions. He was moved to the bullpen in mid-June, though he made occasional starts for the Brewers during the rest of the season and returned to the rotation just before September started. On September 11, he pitched seven shutout innings and allowed only three hits, earning the win in a 3–0 triumph over the Angels. In 43 games (22 starts), he had an 8–12 record, a career-best 2.94 ERA, 92 strikeouts, 62 walks, and 164 hits allowed in 180 1/3 innings.

=== Boston Red Sox (1972) ===
Ten days after the 1971 season ended, on October 10, Krausse was part of a ten-player trade that sent him, Pattin, Tommy Harper, and minor-league outfielder Pat Skrable from the Brewers to the Red Sox for George Scott, Jim Lonborg, Ken Brett, Billy Conigliaro, Joe Lahoud and Don Pavletich. He was excited about his new team, pointing out that "This is the first time I've been with a contender. It's easily the best shot I've ever had at a pennant." Still trying to earn a starting spot with the Red Sox after the season began, he pitched nine scoreless innings against the Texas Rangers in his first start on April 30, earning the win in Boston's 10-inning, 3–0 triumph. He continued making starts after that but lost his only three decisions, posted a 4.81 ERA through June 2, and was moved to the bullpen thereafter. After August 20, though Krausse remained on the roster and the Red Sox had 42 games remaining in their season, he was not used at all. In 24 games (seven starts), he had a 1–3 record, a 6.38 ERA, 35 strikeouts, 28 walks, and 74 hits allowed in 60 2/3 innings.

=== St. Louis Cardinals (1973) ===
The Red Sox released Krausse towards the end of 1973 spring training, on March 27. Four days later, he was re-signed by the Athletics, but only to a minor league contract. He spent most of the season with the PCL's Tucson Toros, posting a 6–4 record, 12 saves, a 2.49 ERA, 54 strikeouts, 43 walks, and 110 hits allowed in 105 innings over 45 games (three starts). The St. Louis Cardinals purchased his contract on September 1 when rosters expanded, but he only made one appearance for them. After the season, the Cardinals released him.

=== Atlanta Braves (1974) ===
On December 17, 1973, the Atlanta Braves signed Krausse. Failing to make their roster out of spring training, he had his contract sold to the Athletics again on April 11. After he posted a 1.08 ERA in 11 games with Tucson, the Braves repurchased his contract on May 16, adding him to their bullpen when Ron Reed went on the disabled list with a broken finger. Krausse won his first outing with the Braves, pitching scoreless 10th and 11th innings in a 5–3 triumph over the Los Angeles Dodgers on May 17. His longest relief outings of the year came in back-to-back 4 1/3-inning outings on July 12 and 20. In the second game of a doubleheader against the New York Mets on August 23, he started and allowed one hit in six innings, earning the victory in a 6–0 triumph. He played his final game of the season on September 23, allowing two runs in 1/3 of an inning during a 4–3 loss to the Dodgers. In 29 games (four starts), he had a 4–3 record, a 4.19 ERA, 27 strikeouts, 32 walks, and 65 hits allowed in 66 2/3 innings. The Braves released him on December 16.

In 1975, Krausse returned to Tucson with the Athletics organization. Making 44 appearances (four starts), he had an 8–4 record but a 5.40 ERA, worse than the PCL average by about a run. Following the season, he retired.

== Career statistics, pitching style ==
Krausse pitched in a total of 321 games in his career, 167 as a starting pitcher. His career win–loss record was 68–91; he pitched 1,284 total innings, with 1,205 hits allowed, 721 strikeouts and 493 walks allowed. His ERA was 4.00.

Originally a fastball-curveball pitcher, Krausse added a changeup and a slider as his career progressed. Dark said of Krausse in 1966, "His curve is exceptional. He reminds me a lot of Carl Erskine." Both Dark and Cot Deal, the Athletics' pitching coach, helped Krausse develop his changeup that same year.

== Personal life ==
Krausse married Susan Wickersham, a flight attendant, in November 1969. They remained married for the rest of his life. The couple had two sons, Kurt and Chad, who lived in Kansas City after they grew up. During offseasons, he held a number of different jobs. He once was employed with former major leaguers Mickey Vernon and Danny Murtaugh at a Chester clothing shop. Other fields he labored in included dock work, real estate, season ticket salesman, and hotel public relations. He was inducted into the Delaware County Sports Hall of Fame in 1981, joining his father, who had been inducted in 1963. Continuing to serve as a salesman after his career, in 1983, Krausse took on a larger role when he partnered with Fred Paulsen and Bill Drummond to start a metals service center in Kansas City. The business expanded to serve six states by 1997, when Krausse and Drummond sold it to a larger corporation. Following his baseball career, he became an avid golfer. He lived in rural Holt, Missouri, and enjoyed travelling to Las Vegas and Churchill Downs. He died of cancer on February 16, 2021, at the age of 77.

== See also ==
- List of second-generation Major League Baseball players
