= Duane Josephson =

American baseball player (1942–1997)

- Topps baseball card - 1970 Series, #263
- Catcher
- Born: June 3, 1942; New Hampton, Iowa, U.S.
- Died: January 30, 1997 (aged 54); New Hampton, Iowa, U.S.
- Batted: Right Threw: Right

MLB debut
- September 15, 1965, for the Chicago White Sox

Last MLB appearance
- July 2, 1972, for the Boston Red Sox

MLB statistics
- Batting average: .258
- Home runs: 23
- Runs batted in: 164
- Stats at Baseball Reference

Teams
- Chicago White Sox (1965–1970); Boston Red Sox (1971–1972)

Career highlights and awards
- All-Star (1968)

Duane Charles Josephson (June 3, 1942 – January 30, 1997) was an American catcher who played in Major League Baseball for the Chicago White Sox and Boston Red Sox in parts of eight seasons spanning 1965–1972. Listed at 6' 0", 190 lb., he batted and threw right-handed.

Josephson was born in New Hampton, Iowa, where he attended New Hampton High School. Josephson then attended University of Northern Iowa.

His most productive season came in 1968, when he posted career-highs in hits (107), doubles (16), triples (six), RBI (45), games (128), and was selected to the All-Star Game.

In an eight-season career, Josephson posted a .258 batting average with 23 home runs and 164 RBI in 470 games played.

In between, Josephson appeared in four Minor League seasons from 1964–1967, and also played winter ball with the Navegantes del Magallanes club of the Venezuelan League during the 1966-67 tournament.

Additionally, he earned the Pacific Coast League MVP Award in 1966, after hitting a slash line of .324/.369/.446 with 237 total bases and 77 RBI in 146 games for the Indianapolis Indians.

Josephson was forced to retire from baseball at the age of 30 due to pericarditis. He died in 1997 in his hometown of New Hampton, Iowa, at the age of 54.
