= Dave Martin (sportscaster) =

Dave Martin is a former American sportscaster who spent seven seasons as a play-by-play announcer in Major League Baseball.

== Career ==
Martin called Chicago White Sox games on WFLD in 1968. He spent the next three seasons on WJW-TV calling Cleveland Indians games before being replaced by Rocky Colavito in 1972. Martin began the 1972 season without a broadcasting job; however, in June he replaced the ailing John MacLean on WHDH radio in Boston, calling Boston Red Sox games with Ned Martin (no relation). Martin also called the first season of New England Whalers hockey for WHDH. His final major announcing job was with the Pittsburgh Pirates in 1980. Martin also served as a play-by-play announcer for the NFL on NBC in 1970 and College Football on ABC in 1967.
