= Marty Pattin =

American baseball player (1943–2018)

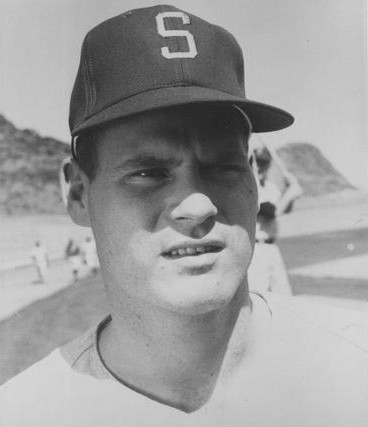
- Pattin in 1969
- Pitcher
- Born: April 6, 1943; Charleston, Illinois, U.S.
- Died: October 3, 2018 (aged 75); Charleston, Illinois, U.S.
- Batted: Right Threw: Right

MLB debut
- May 14, 1968, for the California Angels

Last MLB appearance
- October 1, 1980, for the Kansas City Royals

MLB statistics
- Win–loss record: 114–109
- Earned run average: 3.62
- Strikeouts: 1,179
- Stats at Baseball Reference

Teams
- California Angels (1968); Seattle Pilots / Milwaukee Brewers (1969–1971); Boston Red Sox (1972–1973); Kansas City Royals (1974–1980)

Career highlights and awards
- All-Star (1971)

Martin William Pattin (April 6, 1943 – October 3, 2018) was an American professional baseball player who appeared in 475 games in Major League Baseball as a right-handed pitcher. He pitched for the California Angels (1968), Seattle Pilots / Milwaukee Brewers (1969–1971), Boston Red Sox (1972–1973), and the Kansas City Royals (1974–1980). During a 13-year MLB career, Pattin compiled 114 wins, 1,179 strikeouts, and a 3.62 earned run average (ERA).

== Biography ==
Pattin was born in Charleston, Illinois, where he attended high school; he earned his bachelor's and master's degrees at Eastern Illinois University. A member of the Eastern Illinois Panthers baseball team, Pattin struck out 22 batters in a game.

Pattin was selected in the seventh round (127th overall) by the California Angels 1965 Major League Baseball draft. He played in the minor leagues with the Seattle Rainiers for two seasons before being promoted to the majors. He left the Angels via the 1968 Major League Baseball expansion draft and joined the Seattle Pilots, which later became the Milwaukee Brewers in 1970. In Milwaukee, Pattin finished with a 14–12 record and a 3.39 ERA in 37 games (29 starts) in 1970, and was named an All-Star in 1971, when he finished with a 14–14 record and a 3.13 ERA in 36 starts.

Pattin was part of a ten-player blockbuster trade that sent him, Tommy Harper, Lew Krausse and minor-league outfielder Pat Skrable to the Red Sox for George Scott, Jim Lonborg, Ken Brett, Billy Conigliaro, Joe Lahoud and Don Pavletich on October 10, 1971. He won 32 games in two seasons with the Red Sox, including a no-hit bid foiled in 1972, when A's Reggie Jackson hit a single off him with one out in the ninth inning. According to fellow pitcher Bill "Spaceman" Lee, Pattin had a habit of throwing up after the first inning of nearly every game he pitched with the Red Sox.

Sent to the Kansas City Royals in exchange for Dick Drago on October 24, 1973, Pattin divided his playing time between starting and relieving. The Kansas City Star named Pattin as the Royals' pitcher of the month twice during the 1975 campaign, in June as a starter and in September as a reliever. He retired after being granted free agency following the 1980 season.

After Pattin's retirement as a player, he remained involved with the sport as a coach. He was the head coach of the University of Kansas baseball team from 1982 to 1987. Pattin died in his sleep while visiting friends in his hometown of Charleston, Illinois on October 3, 2018.
