= Ned Martin =

American sportscaster (1923–2002)

- Martin on "Yaz Day" at Fenway Park in 1983
- Born: Edwin Martin III; August 9, 1923; Wayne, Pennsylvania, U.S.
- Died: July 23, 2002 (aged 78); Raleigh, North Carolina, U.S.
- Education: Duke University
- Sports commentary career
- Team: Boston Red Sox (1961–92)
- Genre: Play-by-play
- Sport: Major League Baseball

Edwin Martin III (August 9, 1923 – July 23, 2002) was an American sportscaster, known primarily as a play-by-play announcer for Major League Baseball's Boston Red Sox from 1961 to 1992.

== Broadcasting career ==
Martin was born in Wayne, Pennsylvania, and grew up in Upper Merion Township, where as a youth he was a passionate follower of Philadelphia's two major-league teams, the Athletics and the Phillies. He attended Duke University and played varsity baseball until World War II interrupted his education. Martin joined the United States Marine Corps, where he was a combat veteran and took part in the Battle of Iwo Jima. After the war, he returned to Duke to earn a degree in English literature in 1948.

He worked in advertising before beginning his baseball broadcasting career as the play-by-play voice of the Charleston Senators of the Triple-A American Association for WCHS (AM) in West Virginia in 1956. After five years with Charleston, Martin was hired in the autumn of 1960 to succeed Bill Crowley as a member of the Red Sox' radio/TV team; he had filled in with the Bosox' broadcasting crew during a series in Baltimore during the 1960 campaign, effectively a successful audition for a permanent role.

=== Boston Red Sox ===
Martin called Boston Red Sox games on both WHDH radio and WHDH-TV from 1961 to 1971, on WHDH radio only from 1972 to 1975, on WMEX/WITS radio from 1976 to 1978, on WSBK-TV from 1979 to 1987, and on New England Sports Network cable from 1985 to 1992. He worked alongside fellow announcers or analysts Curt Gowdy, Art Gleeson, Mel Parnell, Ken Coleman, Johnny Pesky, John MacLean, Dave Martin (no relation), Jim Woods, Ken Harrelson, Bob Montgomery, and Jerry Remy.

He began his Boston career in a supporting role for #1 announcers Gowdy (through 1965) and Coleman (1966–1971). But, after the 1971 season, when WHDH-TV's owner, the Boston Herald-Traveler, lost its television license, the Red Sox split their TV and radio crews, with Coleman and analyst Pesky working strictly on television with the Red Sox' new flagship, WBZ-TV.

Martin remained with the Red Sox' radio team as its new lead announcer, initially working with MacLean, briefly, then Dave Martin in 1972 and 1973. Then, in 1974, he established a memorable collaboration with longtime MLB announcer Woods. Their five-year partnership included the Red Sox' 1975 pennant-winning season, and concluded with the 1978 American League East tie-breaker game, which Boston famously lost on Bucky Dent's home run. Despite their relatively short time together, their chemistry and rapport were noted by national observers such as Roger Angell of The New Yorker and Bill Littlefield of National Public Radio.

"The familiar quiet tones and effortless precision of the veteran Red Sox announcers, Ned Martin and Jim Woods, invited me to share with them the profound New England seriousness of Following the Sox," wrote Angell, owner of a summer home in Maine, in 1978. With Martin and Woods "on the radio, I was in the company of two favorite uncles, at once knowledgeable and mischievous. When they were on the job, I didn't mind rain delays. Sometimes I hoped for them," wrote Littlefield in 2013.

However, the team of Martin and Woods was broken up after the 1978 campaign, when the Bosox' flagship radio station, WITS-AM, fired them, seeking more sponsor-friendly on-air talent. Both men moved to television: Martin to WSBK-TV as the television voice of the Red Sox, replacing Dick Stockton, and Woods to national games on USA Network.

During Martin's three decades with the Red Sox, he called the entire career of Hall-of-Famer Carl Yastrzemski, and was behind the microphone for some of baseball's most memorable moments, including the final win of the Red Sox "Impossible Dream" season of 1967, Carlton Fisk's game-winning home run off the foul pole in Game 6 of the 1975 World Series, Yastrzemski's 400th home run and 3,000th base hit in 1979, and Roger Clemens' first 20-strikeout game on April 29, 1986. Martin was known for his erudition and literary references during broadcasts (quotations from Shakespeare were not uncommon) and for his signature exclamation, "Mercy!", after an exciting play.

Having spent 32 seasons with the club's broadcast team calling games on radio and television, he described as many as 5,130 regular and postseason Red Sox games.

=== Legacy ===
Martin was inducted into the Boston Red Sox Hall of Fame in 2000. On November 1, 2019, Martin was named as a finalist for the Ford C. Frick Award as part of 2020 Baseball Hall of Fame balloting.

=== Other assignments ===
Martin also was a football announcer, covering the American Football League's Boston Patriots in 1965, and college football games for Harvard, Yale, and Dartmouth.

Nationally, Martin helped broadcast the 1975 World Series on NBC television, four American League Championship Series on CBS Radio, and the 1977 Sun Bowl on CBS Radio.

== Death ==
Ned Martin attended a memorial service for Ted Williams at Boston's Fenway Park on July 22, 2002, and was returning to his home in Clarksville, Virginia, the following day when he was stricken with a massive coronary on a shuttle bus at Raleigh-Durham International Airport; he died there.

== Quotes ==
The pitch is looped toward shortstop. Petrocelli's back. He's got it! The Red Sox win! And there's pandemonium on the field! Listen! – Ned Martin on WHDH radio, calling the final out of the final game of the Red Sox' "Impossible Dream" season at Fenway Park, October 1, 1967, with Jim Lonborg pitching for the Red Sox, and batter Rich Rollins of the Minnesota Twins popping up to Rico Petrocelli to end the game.

The 1-0 delivery to Fisk. He swings...long drive, left field...if it stays fair, it's gone...HOME RUN! The Red Sox win! And the series is tied, three games apiece! – Martin on NBC Radio, calling Carlton Fisk's 12th inning game-winning home run at Fenway Park, October 21, 1975, off Pat Darcy of the Cincinnati Reds. (Audio)

Long drive, right field...way back...near the wall...and there it is! Home run number 400, Carl Yastrzemski! Now...listen and watch! – Martin on WSBK-TV, calling Carl Yastrzemski's 400th home run at Fenway Park, July 24, 1979, off Mike Morgan of the Oakland Athletics.

There goes a ground ball...base hit! Number 3000...Yastrzemski's got it! And all hell breaks loose at Fenway Park! – Martin on WSBK-TV, calling Yastrzemski's 3000th base hit at Fenway Park, September 12, 1979, off Jim Beattie of the New York Yankees.

A new record! Clemens has set a major league record for strikeouts in a game...20! – Martin on NESN, calling Roger Clemens' record-setting 20th strikeout in one game at Fenway Park, April 29, 1986, against Phil Bradley of the Seattle Mariners.
