= Ben Oglivie =

Panamanian baseball player (born 1949)

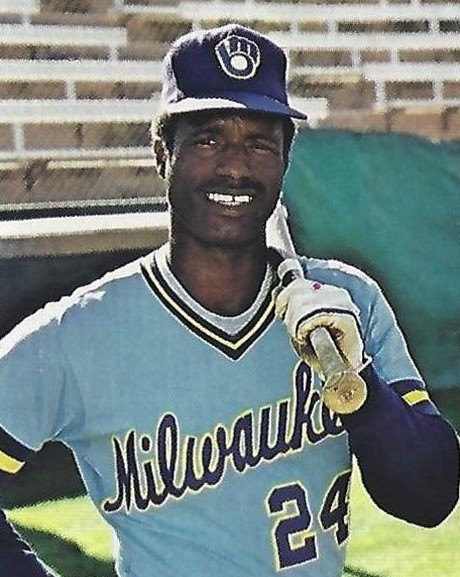
- Left fielder
- Born: February 11, 1949 (age 77); Colón, Panama
- Batted: Left Threw: Left

Professional debut
- MLB: September 4, 1971, for the Boston Red Sox
- NPB: April 14, 1987, for the Kintetsu Buffaloes

Last appearance
- MLB: October 5, 1986, for the Milwaukee Brewers
- NPB: October 19, 1988, for the Kintetsu Buffaloes

MLB statistics
- Batting average: .273
- Home runs: 235
- Runs batted in: 901

NPB statistics
- Batting average: .306
- Home runs: 46
- Runs batted in: 139
- Stats at Baseball Reference

Teams
- Boston Red Sox (1971–1973); Detroit Tigers (1974–1977); Milwaukee Brewers (1978–1986); Kintetsu Buffaloes (1987–1988)

Career highlights and awards
- 3× All-Star (1980, 1982, 1983); Silver Slugger Award (1980); AL home run leader (1980); Milwaukee Brewers Wall of Honor

Benjamin Ambrosio Oglivie Palmer (/ˈoʊɡlɪviː/ OH-glih-vee; born February 11, 1949) is a Panamanian former professional baseball left fielder, who played in Major League Baseball (MLB) for the Boston Red Sox (1971–1973), Detroit Tigers (1974–1977), and Milwaukee Brewers (1978–1986). He also played two seasons in Nippon Professional Baseball (NPB) for the Kintetsu Buffaloes (1987–1988). Oglivie batted and threw left-handed.

Oglivie made his MLB debut on September 4, 1971, for the Red Sox and played his final big league game on October 5, 1986, for the Brewers. He hit for power fairly well, breaking the 40-home run mark in 1980 with 41, which was good for a tie (with Reggie Jackson) for the American League (AL) lead. Oglivie hit three home runs in a game three times. In the process, he became the first non-U.S. born player to lead the AL in home runs. He also finished second in the AL with 118 RBIs and 333 total bases.

Oglivie batted .241 with eight homers and 30 runs batted in (RBI) and led the Red Sox in pinch hitting with a .375 average in his first full MLB season in 1972. After slumping to .218 with two homers in 58 games, he was traded from the Red Sox to the Tigers for Dick McAuliffe on October 23, 1973. Oglivie was acquired by the Brewers from the Tigers for Jim Slaton and Rich Folkers at the Winter Meetings on December 9, 1977.

In a 16-year Major League career, Oglivie posted a .273 batting average, with 277 doubles, 560 bases on balls, 235 home runs and 901 runs batted in (RBI), in 1,754 games. He had 87 career stolen bases and 784 runs scored. Oglivie picked up 1,615 hits in 5,913 at bats. He was also a prolific defender in left field despite never winning a Gold Glove Award, ranking fifth all-time (since 1969) in range factor per inning, an advanced stat that tracks the number of outs made (putouts plus assists) divided by inning.

Oglivie was known for his gentlemanly character and was respected by his teammates. On one occasion, after the team had suffered a loss and he was disappointed by a mistake, he had made his teammates playfully throw him into the clubhouse bathtub and he took a bath together with everyone else. Oglivie was moved, saying that they had accepted him without discrimination and had shared the bath with him.

He then returned to attempt a comeback in American minor league baseball (MiLB); although Oglivie posted great offensive numbers in only two Double-A games, it proved to be the end of his pro baseball playing journey.

Oglivie has coached at various levels for a number of different organizations, including Milwaukee, Pittsburgh, San Diego, Tampa Bay, and Detroit. In 2000, he joined the Padres’ MLB staff for one season.

The Colón, Panama, native was one of six post-1959 players selected as part of the 2012 class inducted in the Latino Baseball Hall of Fame. Each Latin-American country (Puerto Rico, Cuba, Dominican Republic, Mexico, and Venezuela) had one player chosen for enshrinement, which took place in February 2012.

== See also ==
- List of Major League Baseball career home run leaders
- List of Major League Baseball annual home run leaders
