= Don Pavletich =

American baseball player (1938–2020)

- Catcher / First baseman
- Born: July 13, 1938; Milwaukee, Wisconsin, U.S.
- Died: March 5, 2020 (aged 81); Brookfield, Wisconsin, U.S.
- Batted: Right Threw: Right

MLB debut
- April 20, 1957, for the Cincinnati Redlegs

Last MLB appearance
- September 1, 1971, for the Boston Red Sox

MLB statistics
- Batting average: .254
- Home runs: 46
- Runs batted in: 193
- Stats at Baseball Reference

Teams
- Cincinnati Redlegs / Reds (1957; 1959; 1962–1968); Chicago White Sox (1969); Boston Red Sox (1970–1971)
Medals
Representing United States
Global World Series
Gold medal – first place	1956 Milwaukee	Team

Donald Stephen Pavletich (/pævˈlɛtɪk/ pav-LET-ik; July 13, 1938 – March 5, 2020) was an American professional baseball player. He was a catcher and first baseman for the Cincinnati Redlegs / Reds (1957, 1959 and 1962–68), Chicago White Sox (1969) and Boston Red Sox (1970–71).

Pavletich was a graduate of Nathan Hale High School in West Allis, Wisconsin, and was signed as an amateur free agent in 1956 by the Reds.

Pavletich made his Major League debut at the young age of 18 on April 20, 1957, in a 5–4 loss to the Milwaukee Braves at County Stadium, grounding out as a pinch-hitter for Hal Jeffcoat against Ray Crone. It was his only Major League appearance and at-bat of the season, and he also made one hitless at bat in one appearance in the 1959 season.

Pavletich served in the U.S. Army from May 1957 to February 1959.

Pavletich's first Major League hit was in the first game of a doubleheader on April 29, 1962, in a 16–3 Reds loss to the St. Louis Cardinals. Replacing Reds catcher Johnny Edwards midway through the fourth inning, in the next inning Pavletich singled off the Cardinals' Larry Jackson.

Pavletich spent much of his career with the Reds as a backup catcher to all-stars Ed Bailey, Johnny Edwards and Baseball Hall of Fame legend Johnny Bench.

Pavletich was part of a ten-player trade that sent him, George Scott, Jim Lonborg, Ken Brett, Billy Conigliaro and Joe Lahoud from the Boston Red Sox to the Milwaukee Brewers for Tommy Harper, Marty Pattin, Lew Krausse and minor-league outfielder Pat Skrable on October 10, 1971.

In 12 Major League seasons Pavletich played in 536 games with 1,373 at bats, 163 runs, 349 hits, 46 home runs, 193 RBI and a .254 batting average. He recorded an overall .987 fielding percentage.

Pavletich died at the age of 81 on March 5, 2020, and was interred in Wisconsin Memorial Park, Brookfield, Waukesha County, Wisconsin.
