= Matt Sczesny =

American baseball player and scout (1932–2009)

- Infielder / Manager / Scout
- Born: September 7, 1932; Flushing, New York, US
- Died: January 4, 2009 (aged 76); West Islip, New York, US
- Batted: Right Threw: Right
- Stats at Baseball Reference

Matthew John Sczesny [says'-nee] (September 7, 1932 – January 4, 2009) was an American infielder and manager in minor league baseball, and a longtime scout for the Boston Red Sox of the American League. Sczesny, a native of Flushing, New York, spent 55 years in baseball, all of them in the Red Sox organization.

Sczesny graduated from Bishop Loughlin Memorial High School in Brooklyn, New York, and attended St. John's University. He signed with the Red Sox in 1954 and played in their farm system through 1959, except for the 1957 campaign, which he missed while performing military service. He was named a member of the 1955 Sally League All-Star team as an infielder, while a member of the Montgomery Rebels.

In 1960, Sczesny became a manager in the Boston system with the Waterloo Hawks of the Class D Midwest League, and he promptly led the Hawks to the MWL championship—the only league title he would win as a manager. However, he handled many future Major Leaguers as a skipper of Class A farm clubs in the Red Sox chain, until 1970, his final season in uniform, when he served as the first manager in the history of the Pawtucket Red Sox, then Boston's Double-A Eastern League affiliate.

In 1971, he became a scout for the Red Sox, based in Deer Park on Long Island. Sczesny scouted and signed future Red Sox stars Mo Vaughn, Bob Stanley and John Valentin, among others. In 2003, he switched from being an "area scout" tracking amateur high school and college talent to a member of the Red Sox' professional scouting corps, serving through the 2008 campaign.

He died at age 76 from cancer in West Islip, New York, on January 3, 2009.

Preceded by Franchise established	Pawtucket Red Sox (Eastern League) manager 1970	Succeeded by Billy Gardner
