= Buddy Hunter =

American baseball player (born 1947)

- Utility infielder
- Born: August 9, 1947 (age 78); Omaha, Nebraska, U.S.
- Batted: Right Threw: Right

MLB debut
- July 1, 1971, for the Boston Red Sox

Last MLB appearance
- June 1, 1975, for the Boston Red Sox

MLB statistics
- Batting average: .294
- Runs batted in: 2
- Runs scored: 5
- Stats at Baseball Reference

Teams
- Boston Red Sox (1971–1973, 1975)

Harold James Hunter (born August 9, 1947) is an American former utility infielder in Major League Baseball who played for the Boston Red Sox in part of three seasons spanning 1971–1975. Listed at 5' 10", 170 lb., Hunter batted and threw right-handed.

The Red Sox selected Hunter in the third round, 61st pick of the 1969 MLB draft out of the University of Nebraska–Lincoln. A dependable handyman, Hunter was used in pinch hitting, pinch running, DH, and late defensive replacement duties. He hit .294 (5-for-17) with five runs and two RBI in 22 career games, including two doubles and a .478 on-base percentage. In 12 infield appearances at second base (9) and third (3), he compiled a .969 fielding percentage while committing an error in 31 chances.

Following his career in the majors, Hunter played with Triple-A Pawtucket Red Sox (1978–1979) and later managed the Winston-Salem Red Sox (1980–1981).
