= Billy Conigliaro =

American baseball player (1947–2021)

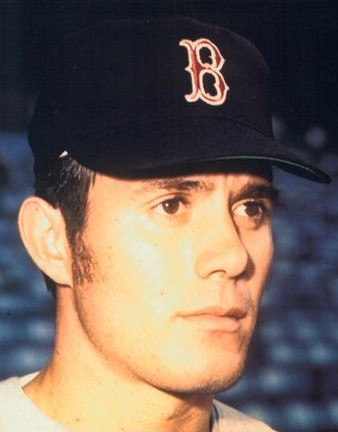
- Conigliaro in 1971
- Outfielder
- Born: August 15, 1947; Revere, Massachusetts, U.S.
- Died: February 10, 2021 (aged 73); Beverly, Massachusetts, U.S.
- Batted: Right Threw: Right

MLB debut
- April 11, 1969, for the Boston Red Sox

Last MLB appearance
- September 30, 1973, for the Oakland Athletics

MLB statistics
- Batting average: .256
- Home runs: 40
- Runs batted in: 128
- Stats at Baseball Reference

Teams
- Boston Red Sox (1969–1971); Milwaukee Brewers (1972); Oakland Athletics (1973)

Career highlights and awards
- World Series champion (1973)

William Michael Conigliaro (August 15, 1947 – February 10, 2021) was an American baseball outfielder who played five seasons in Major League Baseball (MLB). He played for the Boston Red Sox, Milwaukee Brewers, and Oakland Athletics from 1969 to 1973. He batted and threw right-handed, and was the younger brother of Tony Conigliaro, with whom he was teammates on the Red Sox from 1969 until 1970.

== Early life ==
Conigliaro was born in Revere, Massachusetts, on August 15, 1947. His father, Sal, was employed at a tool and die shop and was eventually promoted to plant manager. Both he and his wife, Teresa, inspired their sons to pursue baseball. Conigliaro attended Swampscott High School, where he graduated as a three-sport star. He threw a no-hitter against Winthrop High School in April 1964, several days after his brother Tony made his major league debut. Conigliaro was subsequently drafted by the Boston Red Sox in the first round (fifth overall pick) of the inaugural MLB draft in 1965.

== Professional career ==
Conigliaro played in the minor leagues from the 1965 to 1968 seasons. He made his Major League Baseball debut on April 11, 1969, at the age of 21, entering as a pinch runner and stealing a base in a 2–1 extra-innings win over the Cleveland Indians. He made his first start five days later, hitting two home runs in that game. Although he was sent back to the minors in May, he was called back up by the Red Sox during the September roster expansion. He finished his first year in the majors with a .288 batting average, four home runs, and seven runs batted in (RBIs) in 32 games played.

Conigliaro's best performance came during the 1970 season. He recorded career-highs in hits (108), runs scored (59), home runs (18), RBIs (58), and games played (114). He also had the fifth-most assists as a left fielder in the American League (AL) with seven. In order to fit Conigliaro into their lineup that year, the Red Sox moved Carl Yastrzemski to first base. Billy Conigliaro reportedly became "very emotional" when his brother Tony was traded to the California Angels at the end of the season. He subsequently batted .262 with 11 home runs and 33 RBIs in 1971, finishing eighth in the AL in doubles (26).

Conigliaro was part of a ten-player trade that sent him, George Scott, Jim Lonborg, Ken Brett, Joe Lahoud, and Don Pavletich from the Red Sox to the Milwaukee Brewers for Tommy Harper, Marty Pattin, Lew Krausse, and minor-league outfielder Pat Skrable on October 10, 1971.

Unhappy in Milwaukee, Conigliaro announced his retirement from baseball in the middle of the 1972 season. He applied for reinstatement in 1973, and the Brewers sold Conigliaro to the Oakland Athletics for an undisclosed amount of money. He appeared with the Athletics in that season's American League Championship Series and the World Series, where he was hitless in seven at bats. He had knee surgery during the offseason, and was waived by Oakland in March 1974. He attempted a comeback with the Athletics in 1977, but declined an assignment to the minor leagues. He finished his career with a .256 batting average, 40 home runs, and 128 RBIs in 347 games played.

== Personal life ==
Conigliaro was an early pupil of Shotokan karate grandmaster Kazumi Tabata, who acknowledged Conigliaro in his book. He was married to Keisha on October 19, 2002, until his death. Conigliaro died, age 73, on February 10, 2021, of a heart attack at his home in Beverly, Massachusetts.
