= Mike Nagy =

American baseball player (born 1948)

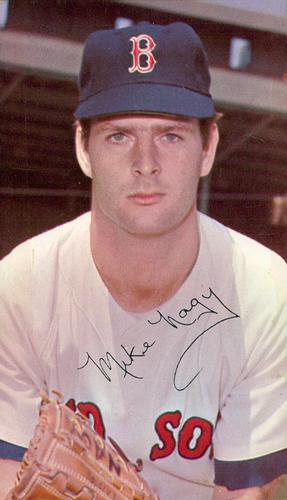
- Pitcher
- Born: March 25, 1948 (age 78); The Bronx, New York, U.S.
- Batted: Right Threw: Right

MLB debut
- April 21, 1969, for the Boston Red Sox

Last MLB appearance
- May 19, 1974, for the Houston Astros

MLB statistics
- Win–loss record: 20–13
- Earned run average: 4.15
- Strikeouts: 170
- Stats at Baseball Reference

Teams
- Boston Red Sox (1969–1972); St. Louis Cardinals (1973); Texas Rangers (1973); Houston Astros (1974)

Michael Timothy Nagy (born March 25, 1948) is an American former professional baseball pitcher who played for the Boston Red Sox, St. Louis Cardinals, Texas Rangers and Houston Astros of Major League Baseball (MLB). He batted and threw right-handed, stood 6 feet 3 inches (1.91 m) tall and weighed 195 pounds (88 kg). Nagy played professionally from 1966 to 1974, and was traded five times throughout his career.

== Career ==
Nagy was born in The Bronx but raised in Lebanon, Pennsylvania by a Jewish family originally from New Jersey. He was drafted in the 6th round (104th overall) of the 1966 Major League Baseball draft by the Boston Red Sox out of St Helena's High School for Boys now called Monsignor Scanlan High School in Bronx, NY. He played three years in the minor leagues, and made his major league debut in 1969. Nagy had a very good year in his first major league season, with 12 wins, and only 2 losses. He also had a 3.11 earned run average. This season led to him being selected as American League Rookie pitcher of the Year.

Nagy's pitching career never was as good as his rookie season was. Due to major arm injuries, he never pitched an entire season in the Major Leagues without being placed on the disabled list with an arm injury. He spent the next three years with the Red Sox before being traded to the St. Louis Cardinals for a player to be named later. The Red Sox were later sent pitcher Lance Clemons. Just a little more than two months later on March 31, 1973, he was traded to the Texas Rangers. This trade was to complete a deal between the Cardinals and Rangers that had been made on February 1, 1973. The Cardinals originally sent pitcher Charlie Hudson and a player to be named later to the Rangers for Mike Thompson. Nagy was sent to the Rangers to complete the trade. He was again sent to the Cardinals, where he played for one season. After that, he played for the Houston Astros for one year and retired in 1975.

From 1976 to 1979 he played in the Mexican League.
