= Sonny Siebert =

American baseball player (born 1937)

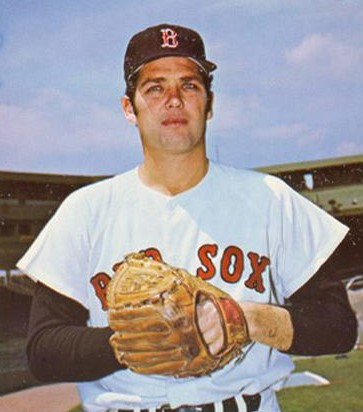
- Pitcher
- Born: January 14, 1937 (age 89); St. Mary, Missouri, U.S.
- Batted: Right Threw: Right

MLB debut
- April 26, 1964, for the Cleveland Indians

Last MLB appearance
- September 25, 1975, for the Oakland Athletics

MLB statistics
- Win–loss record: 140–114
- Earned run average: 3.21
- Strikeouts: 1,512
- Stats at Baseball Reference

Teams
- Cleveland Indians (1964–1969); Boston Red Sox (1969–1973); Texas Rangers (1973); St. Louis Cardinals (1974); San Diego Padres (1975); Oakland Athletics (1975)

Career highlights and awards
- 2× All-Star (1966, 1971); Pitched a No-hitter on June 10, 1966

Wilfred Charles "Sonny" Siebert (born January 14, 1937) is an American former Major League Baseball right-handed pitcher from 1964 to 1975. He finished with a record of 140-114 and a 3.21 ERA. He threw a no-hitter on June 10, 1966, against the Washington Senators. He was drafted simultaneously by the Cleveland Indians and the St. Louis Hawks of the NBA.

== Early life ==
Siebert was born on January 14, 1937, in St. Mary, Missouri. He attended Bayless Senior High School, and the University of Missouri. At Missouri, he played basketball for three years (1956-1958), leading the team in scoring his final year. He played baseball for one year, playing first base and leading the team in home runs (1958). He played on the 1958 team, along with future major league pitcher John O'Donoghue, that lost in the College World Series (CWS) finals in 12 innings to the University of Southern California (whose roster included, among others, future major league players Don Buford and Ron Fairly, and major league Hall of Fame executive Pat Gillick). He was first-team All-Big 8 and third-team All-American. He was selected to the CWS All- Tournament Team that year.

Siebert was named to the All-Time CWS Team for the 1950s. He was inducted into the University of Missouri Athletics Hall of Fame in 2004. In 2017, he was inducted into the St. Louis Sports Hall of Fame. He was also drafted by the St. Louis Hawks of the National Basketball Association.

== Professional career ==
=== Minor leagues ===
In 1958, Siebert signed with the Cleveland Indians as a free agent outfielder. He played in lower-level minor leagues and suffered an injury in 1959, causing him to miss considerable time. Two years into his minor league career, Indians minor league pitching coach Spud Chandler convinced Siebert to try pitching. Chandler himself had been an All-Star pitcher for the New York Yankees, with a lifetime 109-43 record and 2.84 earned run average (ERA). Earlier in Siebert's life, his father told Siebert not to become a pitcher. His father had been a hard throwing pitcher as a young man and injured his arm preparing for a major league tryout, losing the opportunity to audition for Rogers Hornsby and the St. Louis Cardinals years earlier.

During this period, the NBA's St. Louis Hawks asked Siebert to try out for the team for the 1959-60 season. Siebert participated in the Hawks training camp for two-three weeks, but chose baseball.

Siebert was in the Indians minor league system from 1958 to 1963. His best year was 1962, pitching for Charleston in the Eastern League, Single-A baseball, where he had a record of 15-8 with a 2.91 ERA.

=== Major leagues ===
==== Cleveland Indians ====
Siebert made his major league debut in 1964, pitching in 41 games for Cleveland, starting in 14 games. He had a 7–9 record with a 3.23 ERA. In 1965 and 1966 he had identical 16–8 win–loss records, with 2.43 and 2.80 ERAs respectively. Not long after conferring with pitching coach Early Wynn (himself a Hall of Fame pitcher), on June 10, 1966, Siebert pitched a no-hitter against the Washington Senators.

In those years with Cleveland, the starting pitching staff also included lifetime 229 game winner and Hall of Fame candidate Luis Tiant and "Sudden" Sam McDowell, who was considered to be the most talented pitcher in baseball (though not the winningest). In 1965, McDowell and Siebert ranked 1st and 3rd in ERA for the American League (Tiant was 25th); in 1966, Siebert and McDowell ranked 7th and 8th in ERA for the American League (their teammates Steve Hargan and Gary Bell being 3rd and 14th); and in 1967, Siebert and Tiant ranked 3rd and 10th.

==== Boston Red Sox ====
Although ranking third in ERA for the second time in three years, Siebert's 1967 record was 10-12. In 1968, he had a 12–10 record. This was his final full year in Cleveland. He was traded along with Joe Azcue and Vicente Romo from the Indians to the Boston Red Sox for Ken Harrelson, Dick Ellsworth, and Juan Pizarro on April 19, 1969. Siebert spent all or part of five seasons with the Red Sox and was named an All-Star in 1971. Siebert was the most recent American League pitcher to hit two home runs in one game, until July 27, 2023, when Shohei Ohtani matched him. Siebert accomplished the feat for the Red Sox on September 2, 1971, against the Baltimore Orioles, before the introduction of the designated hitter.

==== Final playing years ====
He was traded in 1973 to the Texas Rangers, and then played for the St. Louis Cardinals, San Diego Padres, and Oakland Athletics. The Rangers traded him to the Cardinals for Tommy Cruz and cash on October 26, 1973. On September 11, 1974, he was credited with the win in a 25-inning Cardinal win over the New York Mets. It is the second longest game in innings played in National League history.

He was involved in a three-team deal on November 18, 1974, in which he was dealt along with Alan Foster and Rich Folkers from the Cardinals to the Padres for Ed Brinkman who had been sent to San Diego with Bob Strampe and Dick Sharon from the Detroit Tigers for Nate Colbert. Danny Breeden went from the Padres to the Cardinals to subsequently complete the transactions. He split the 1975 season, his final year as a player, between the Padres and the Oakland Athletics, after being traded for Ted Kubiak on May 16, 1975. He finished the season with a combined 7–6 record and 3.90 ERA.

=== Career ===
For his career, Siebert had a 140–114 record, with a 3.21 ERA and 29.3 WAR (wins above replacement). He started 307 games and had 16 saves, with 1,512 strikeouts and only 692 bases on balls in 2,152 innings pitched, averaging 2.9 bases on balls per nine innings, 6.8 strikeouts per nine innings, .8 home runs per nine innings, with a 2.18 strikeout to walk ratio.

As a hitter, Siebert was an occasional home run threat. He posted a .173 batting average (114-for-660) with 52 runs, 12 home runs and 57 RBIs. In 1971, as a member of the Red Sox, he batted a career-high .266 (21-for-79) with 6 home runs and 15 RBIs, also career highs. Two of his home runs came in a game against the Baltimore Orioles in September of 1971 against Pat Dobson, in which he also pitched a three-hit shutout.

== Pitching coach ==
From 1984-95, Siebert was a pitching coach for the San Diego Padres' franchise. In 1994-95, Siebert was the pitching coach for the National League's San Diego Padres. He was the pitching coach for the Padres Double-A affiliate in the Texas League, the Wichita Wranglers, in 1992-93. In 1991, he was pitching coach for the Single-A Waterloo Diamonds, the Padres affiliate in the Midwest League. In 1985 and 1987-88, he served as pitching coach for the Las Vegas Stars of the Pacific Coast League, the Padres Triple-A affiliate. In 1986, he was pitching coach for the Spokane Indians, the Padres affiliate in the lower Single-A Northwest League. In 1984, Siebert was a pitching coach for Padres affiliate Miami Marlins in the Single-A Florida State League.

He also served as a coach for the Colorado Springs Sky Sox in 1997-98, the Colorado Rockies' affiliate in the Pacific Coast League. Between his playing retirement in 1975 and coaching Miami, Siebert resided in St. Louis, working in business; but also coached college baseball with the Southern Illinois-Edwardsville baseball team, and the St. Louis University teams.

== See also ==
- List of Major League Baseball no-hitters

Preceded by Dave Morehead	No-hitter pitcher June 10, 1966	Succeeded by Steve Barber & Stu Miller
