= Bob Montgomery (baseball) =

American baseball player (born 1944)

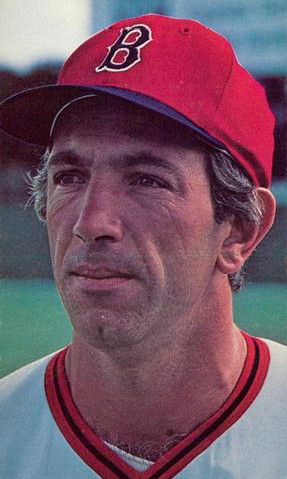
- Montgomery with the Red Sox in 1976
- Catcher
- Born: April 16, 1944 (age 81); Nashville, Tennessee, U.S.
- Batted: Right Threw: Right

MLB debut
- September 6, 1970, for the Boston Red Sox

Last MLB appearance
- September 9, 1979, for the Boston Red Sox

MLB statistics
- Batting average: .258
- Home runs: 23
- Runs batted in: 156
- Stats at Baseball Reference

Teams
- Boston Red Sox (1970–1979)

Robert Edward Montgomery (born April 16, 1944) is an American former professional baseball player and television sports commentator. Nicknamed "Monty", he played his entire career in Major League Baseball (MLB) as a catcher and occasional first baseman for the Boston Red Sox from 1970 to 1979.

Montgomery signed with the Red Sox as an amateur free agent in 1962 and played for seven of their minor league affiliates until 1970, when the Red Sox promoted him to the major leagues. There, he was the team's backup catcher behind future Hall of Famer Carlton Fisk. Montgomery spent the next nine years with the Red Sox and played his last game on September 9, 1979. He is notable for being the last major league player to bat without wearing a helmet.

== Personal life ==
Montgomery was born on April 16, 1944, in Nashville, Tennessee. Baseball played a huge role in his family; his father frequently took part in sandlot ball, while his brother Gerald played for several minor league affiliates of the Boston Red Sox. Montgomery attended Nashville's Central High School. Although he actively participated in three sports, he was most inclined to baseball, playing in the outfield, at first base and pitching.

Upon his graduation from high school. Montgomery was signed by George J. Digby, a renowned scout who worked for the Boston Red Sox organization.

== Professional career ==
=== Minor leagues ===
Montgomery began his professional baseball career for the Olean Red Sox, a minor league baseball team that were members of the New York–Penn League. Playing both third base and the outfield, he batted .273, enough to earn him a promotion to the Class-A Waterloo Hawks of the Midwest League in the following season. It was here that Montgomery was encouraged by manager Len Okrie to switch positions to catcher, in order to improve his chances of being promoted into the major leagues.

=== Boston Red Sox (1970–1979) ===
In 1971, Major League Baseball made it compulsory for all players to wear batting helmets, although active players like Montgomery were allowed to continue batting without one per a grandfather clause. Montgomery used this privilege, choosing to strengthen the inside of his cap with protective plastic lining instead. Consequently, Montgomery was the last major league player to bat without wearing a helmet when he played his final game on September 9, 1979.

In 387 career games, he compiled a .258 batting average with 23 home runs and 156 runs batted in.

== Post-playing career ==
After his playing career, Montgomery spent fourteen seasons (1982–1995) as the color commentator for Red Sox telecasts on WSBK-TV and NESN (1985–1987). Montgomery now owns and operates Big League Promotions which manufactures game boards using professional sports licensing. He has also served as a color analyst for telecasts of the minor-league Pawtucket Red Sox and Portland Sea Dogs on NESN and Cox Sports.

== See also ==
- List of Major League Baseball players who spent their entire career with one franchise
