= Rico Petrocelli =

American baseball player (born 1943)

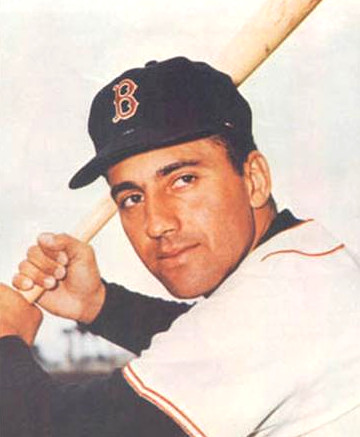
- Petrocelli in 1969
- Shortstop / Third baseman
- Born: June 27, 1943 (age 83); Brooklyn, New York, U.S.
- Batted: Right Threw: Right

MLB debut
- September 21, 1963, for the Boston Red Sox

Last MLB appearance
- September 14, 1976, for the Boston Red Sox

MLB statistics
- Batting average: .251
- Home runs: 210
- Runs batted in: 773
- Stats at Baseball Reference

Teams
- Boston Red Sox (1963, 1965–1976)

Career highlights and awards
- 2× All-Star (1967, 1969); Boston Red Sox Hall of Fame

Americo Peter "Rico" Petrocelli (born June 27, 1943) is an American former professional baseball player and minor league manager. He played his entire Major League Baseball (MLB) career as a shortstop and third baseman for the Boston Red Sox, where he established himself as a fan favorite. A two-time All-Star shortstop, Petrocelli appeared in two World Series with the Red Sox (1967, 1975). He was inducted into the Boston Red Sox Hall of Fame in 1997.

== Early life ==
Petrocelli was born to Italian immigrant parents in Coney Island, Brooklyn, New York City. His father was a garment worker in Manhattan. He was the youngest of seven children. He graduated from Sheepshead Bay High School in 1961.

== Playing career ==
Petrocelli was signed by the Boston Red Sox as an amateur free agent in July 1961.

=== Minor leagues ===
Petrocelli spent the 1962 season with Boston's Class B farm team, the Winston-Salem Red Sox, batting .277 with 17 home runs and 80 RBIs in 137 games played. In 1963, he played for the Double-A Reading Red Sox, again playing 137 games, with 19 home runs and 78 RBIs with a .239 average.

Petrocelli was a September call-up with Boston in 1963, playing a single MLB game, on September 21 against the Minnesota Twins. He was the starting shortstop and was 1-for-4 at the plate, with his first major league hit being a double off of Lee Stange. In 1964, Petrocelli played 134 games for the Triple-A Seattle Rainiers, batting .231 with 10 home runs and 48 RBIs.

=== Boston Red Sox ===
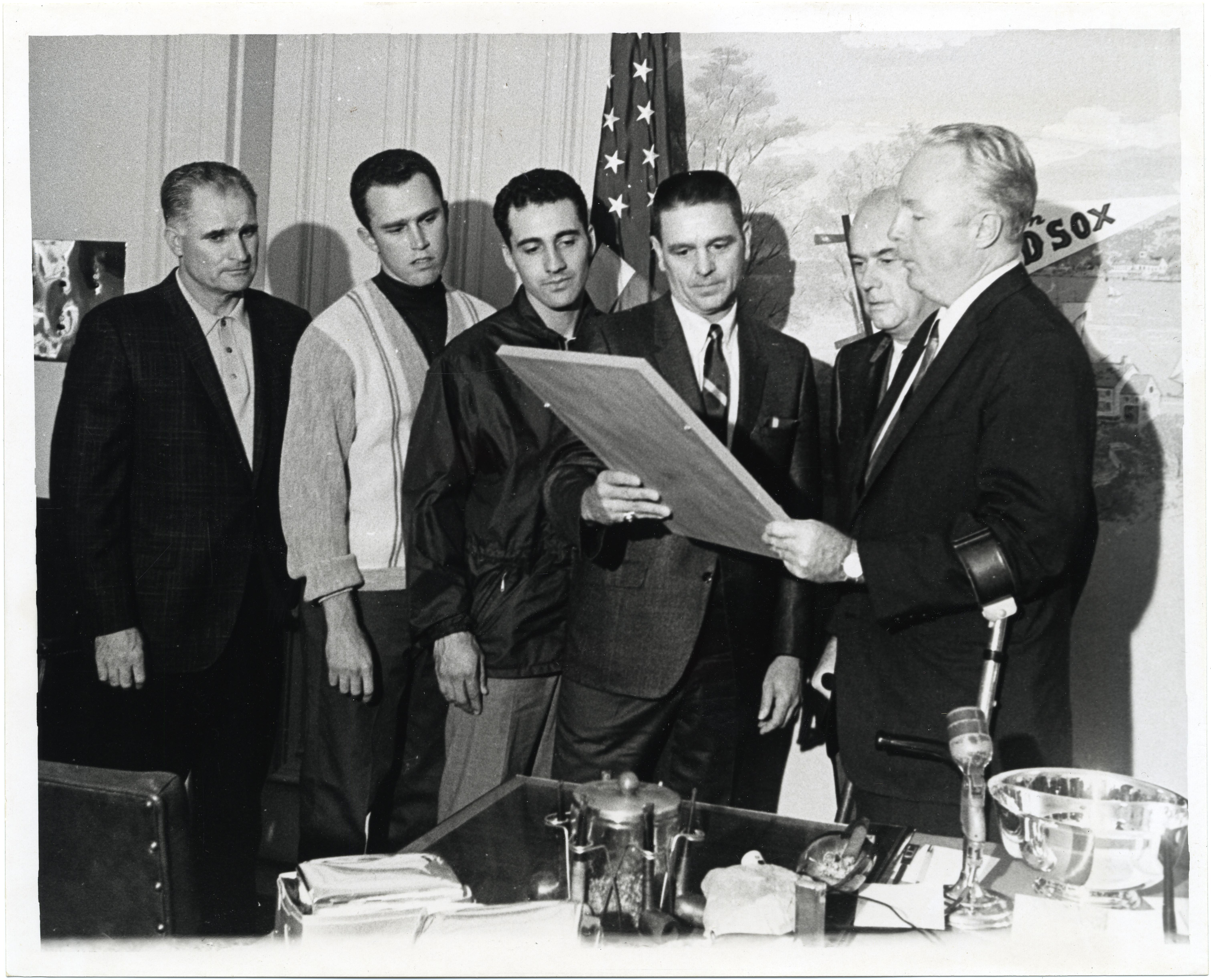
Petrocelli (third from left), Bobby Doerr, Dalton Jones, Dick Williams and Dick O'Connell with Mayor of Boston John F. Collins (at right) in October 1967.

Petrocelli spent all of the 1965 season with Boston, playing in 103 games and making 93 starts at shortstop. Early in his rookie campaign, he experimented with switch hitting, but after batting only .174 with no home runs through 20 games, he returned to his exclusively right-handed stroke on June 6. For the season, he batted .232 with 13 home runs and 33 RBIs. In 1966, Petrocelli batted .238 with 18 home runs and 59 RBIs in 139 games played.

In 1967, Boston's "Impossible Dream" year, Petrocelli was selected to the All-Star game; he was the starting shortstop for the American League team, and went hitless in his one at bat. Petrocelli played in 142 regular season games, with 17 home runs, 66 RBIs, and a .259 average. In the 1967 World Series, he started all seven games, batting 4-for-20 (.200) with two home runs and three RBIs. Both of his home runs came in Game 6, off of Dick Hughes of the St. Louis Cardinals. Boston ultimately lost the series, four games to three.

In 1968, Petrocelli played 123 games while batting .234 with 12 home runs and 46 RBIs. In 1969, he set a record (since broken) for home runs by a shortstop with 40; he had 97 RBIs and a career-high .297 average while playing 154 games. He also played in his second All-Star game, starting at shortstop for the American League squad and going 1-for-3 at the plate, with a double off of Jerry Koosman. Petrocelli led American League shortstops in fielding percentage in both 1968 and 1969, at .978 and .981, respectively.

Petrocelli hit 29 home runs and had a career-high 103 RBIs in 1970, while batting .261 in 157 games. In 1971, the Red Sox acquired shortstop Luis Aparicio and Petrocelli moved to third base. He led American League third basemen in fielding percentage (.976), making only 11 errors in 463 total chances. He batted .251 in a career-high 158 games, with 28 home runs and 89 RBIs.

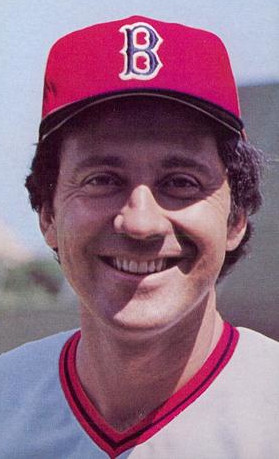
Petrocelli in 1976

In 1972, Petrocelli batted .240 with 15 home runs and 75 RBIs, while playing in 147 games. In 1973, Petrocelli did not play after August 11 due to a calcium deposit in his right elbow, which required surgery. For the season, he appeared in 100 games, batting .244 with 13 home runs and 45 RBIs. He returned in 1974 to play 129 games with 15 home runs, 76 RBIs, and a .267 average. He did not play after September 15, when he was hit in the head by a pitch from Jim Slaton of the Milwaukee Brewers.

During the 1975 regular season, Petrocelli batted .239 in 115 games, with seven home runs and 59 RBIs. He missed the second half of August due to an inner ear problem, likely related to his 1974 beaning. Boston won the American League East, and faced the Oakland Athletics in the American League Championship Series. Petrocelli started all three games at third base, as the Red Sox swept the A's, while batting 2-for-12 (.167) with a home run and two RBIs. In the 1975 World Series, which Boston lost to the Cincinnati Reds, Petrocelli hit .308 (8-for-26) with four RBIs, starting all seven games at third base. He did not commit an error during the 1975 postseason.

In 1976, Petrocelli was placed on the disabled list on August 20, due to further inner ear problems; he played in only three more games that year. For the season, he batted a career-low .213 with three home runs and 24 RBIs in 85 games played. Supplanted by Butch Hobson as the team's regular third baseman, Petrocelli was released by the Red Sox during spring training on March 26, 1977.

During his career with the Red Sox, Petrocelli hit 210 home runs with 773 RBIs and 653 runs scored in 1553 games played, with a .251 average. As of 2018, Petrocelli holds MLB's eighth-best all-time fielding percentage for third basemen (.970). He was inducted to the Boston Red Sox Hall of Fame in 1997.

== Post-playing career ==
Following his playing career, Petrocelli worked in broadcasting and was a minor league manager. He later wrote a book about the 1967 Boston Red Sox season, Rico Petrocelli's Tales from the Impossible Dream Red Sox.

=== Broadcasting ===
For the 1979 Boston Red Sox season, Petrocelli was color commentator for local radio broadcasts on WITS-AM 1510, working with Ken Coleman. In 1980, he began hosting the game show Candlepins for Cash on WXNE-TV, Channel 25 in Boston; he hosted the show through 1982. Also on April 17, 1980, Petrocelli teamed with Jim Woods to call a game between the Kansas City Royals and Baltimore Orioles for the USA Network.

=== Managing ===
Petrocelli managed within the farm systems of the Chicago White Sox and the Boston Red Sox.

Year	Level	Team	League	Record	MLB team	Ref.
1986	Class A	Appleton Foxes	Midwest League	56–83	Chicago White Sox	
1987	Double-A	Birmingham Barons	Southern League	68–75	Chicago White Sox	
1988	Double-A	Birmingham Barons	Southern League	62–82	Chicago White Sox	
1992	Triple-A	Pawtucket Red Sox	International League	71–72	Boston Red Sox	

Notes:

- In 1986, Petrocelli took over as manager of the Appleton Foxes in June.
- The 1987 Birmingham Barons, despite their overall losing record, won the Southern League playoffs.
- The 1992 Pawtucket Red Sox lost in the first round of the International League playoffs.

=== Political activity ===
Petrocelli endorsed Republican Karoline Leavitt, a candidate for New Hampshire's 1st congressional district, in the 2022 election. In 2023, Petrocelli announced his support for former U.S. Senator Kelly Ayotte in the 2024 New Hampshire gubernatorial election, describing her as "the tough conservative we need in Concord".

== Works ==
- Petrocelli, Rico; Scroggins, Chaz (2007). Rico Petrocelli's Tales from the Impossible Dream Red Sox. Sports Publishing LLC. ISBN 978-1596701915.
- Petrocelli, Rico; Scroggins, Chaz (2017). Tales from the 1967 Red Sox: A Collection of the Greatest Stories Ever Told. Sports Publishing LLC. ISBN 978-1683580508.

== See also ==
- List of Major League Baseball players who spent their entire career with one franchise

Preceded by Butch Hobson	Pawtucket Red Sox manager 1992	Succeeded by Buddy Bailey
