= 1967 Boston Red Sox season =

Major League Baseball season

1967 Boston Red Sox
- American League champions
- League: American League
- Ballpark: Fenway Park
- City: Boston, Massachusetts
- Record: 92–70 (.568)
- League place: 1st
- Owners: Tom Yawkey
- President: Tom Yawkey
- General managers: Dick O'Connell
- Managers: Dick Williams
- Television: WHDH-TV 5 (Ken Coleman, Ned Martin, Mel Parnell)
- Radio: WHDH-AM 850 (Ken Coleman, Ned Martin, Mel Parnell)
- Stats: ESPN.com; Baseball Reference

The 1967 Boston Red Sox season was the 67th season in the franchise's Major League Baseball history. The Red Sox finished first in the American League (AL) with a record of 92 wins and 70 losses. The team then faced the National League champion St. Louis Cardinals in the 1967 World Series, which the Red Sox lost in 7 games.

The regular season had one of the most memorable finishes in baseball history, as the AL pennant race went to the last game, with the Red Sox finishing one game ahead of both the Detroit Tigers and Minnesota Twins in the final AL standings. Red Sox left fielder Carl Yastrzemski won the Triple Crown, tying Harmon Killebrew for the AL lead in home runs (44) while leading the league in runs batted in (121) and batting average (.326).

Often referred to as "The Impossible Dream", this was the team's first winning season since 1958, as the Red Sox shocked all of New England and the rest of the baseball world by reaching the World Series for the first time since 1946.

== Offseason ==
=== Transactions ===
- October 21, 1966: The Red Sox release infielder Eddie Kasko and outfielder Lenny Green, 33. Kasko, 35, will succeed Dick Williams as manager of Triple-A Toronto.
- November 28, 1966: The Red Sox select left-hander Bill Landis, 24, from the Kansas City Athletics in the Rule 5 draft.
- November 29, 1966: During the Minor League Draft, Ed Connolly Jr. is drafted from the Red Sox by the Cleveland Indians and Amos Otis was drafted from the Red Sox by the New York Mets.
- December 7, 1966: Ed Rakow and Julio Navarro are traded to the Atlanta Braves for Chris Cannizzaro and John Herrnstein.
- December 17, 1966: Dick Stigman and Roland Sheldon are traded to the Reds to complete the deal made to acquire Hank Fischer.
- January 28, 1967: Geoff Zahn was drafted by the Red Sox in the 5th round of the 1967 Major League Baseball draft (secondary phase), but did not sign.
- February 4, 1967: The Red Sox announce that they have signed Carlton Fisk.
- Prior to 1967 season: Tony Muser was signed as an amateur free agent by the Red Sox.

=== Preseason: Low expectations ===
The Red Sox entered the 1967 season as "doormats" of the American League, with low expectations, low attendance to begin the season, and little known talent outside of team captain Carl Yastrzemski. They had had losing seasons for each of the previous eight years. Two years earlier, the Red Sox had finished the 1965 season with 100 losses. In addition, the team posted ninth-place finishes in 1965 and 1966. Low expectations for the season were demonstrated by the measly 8,324 fans who attended Opening Day, which about matched their average attendance throughout the 1960s.

== Regular season ==
Boston historians consider the 1967 Red Sox season as the "re-invention" of Boston Red Sox baseball. Every aspect of Boston baseball was transformed at the hands of this club. For instance, in 1966, the Red Sox ranked eighth out of ten American League teams in home attendance (811,172). The 1967 season set a Fenway Park record and the Sox finished first in the league in home attendance (1,727,832). Jerry Remy (former Red Sox television broadcaster for NESN) is quoted as saying, "1967 created the Red Sox craze and Red Sox Nation we have today. They re-invented baseball in New England."

=== Major personnel moves ===
In 1967, Dick Williams became the manager of the Red Sox. Previously, he had coached the Red Sox' farm club in Toronto. Williams was a stern disciplinarian and enacted a get tough policy. He stressed the fundamentals. In spring training, he had called George Scott "Bomboclaat Scott".

The Red Sox also made two major acquisitions down the stretch. The first came on August 3, when the Red Sox acquired catcher Elston Howard from the New York Yankees. Howard would hit just .147 while replacing Mike Ryan as the starting catcher, forcing the Red Sox to turn to third-stringer Russ Gibson more and more often down the stretch. While Gibson hit just .203, it was better than either Howard or Ryan (who hit .199) had managed during the season. The acquisition was more about Howard's experience: the Red Sox had a very young team, and Howard was a good influence on their pitching staff. The second was on August 28, when they signed outfielder Ken Harrelson after the Kansas City Athletics released him. Harrelson replaced José Tartabull as the starting right fielder. Tartabull himself had replaced the injured Tony Conigliaro, who was out for the season after a brutal beaning, detailed below.

With the players on their roster averaging 25.4 years of age, the 1967 Red Sox were the second-youngest team in Major League Baseball that season; only the cellar-dwelling Athletics (24.8) were younger.

=== Setback: Tony Conigliaro ===
Throughout the season of 1967, the Red Sox were clicking offensively and defensively right from Opening Day. One of the keys to the Red Sox instant success was young, fan-favorite Tony Conigliaro. Entering his fourth season in 1967, Conigliaro set the bar for his personal success very high, as he achieved immediate success his first three years in the major leagues. In fact, Conigliaro slugged an amazing 24 home runs his rookie season in 1964, followed by an AL leading 32 home runs his sophomore season in 1965 and 28 in 1966. As the Red Sox showed promise in the early part of the 1967 season, Conigliaro's expectations from the fans rose exponentially.

Throughout Conigliaro's first three seasons, minor and typical baseball injuries struck the young player. He had broken his left arm his rookie season, broken his left wrist his sophomore season after being hit by a pitch, and missed day-to-day action on other various minor injuries. Nothing serious had prevented Conigliaro from bouncing back and continuing to see offensive success at an unparalleled rapid pace. Some Red Sox die-hards in fact predicted Conigliaro would finish his career with better numbers than the great Ted Williams.

On August 18, 1967, in the fifth inning of a mid-summer game between Boston and the California Angels at Fenway Park, Conigliaro was beaned by a pitch from Angels pitcher Jack Hamilton right above the left cheek bone. Conigliaro was immediately knocked unconscious and was taken off the field on a stretcher. It was later announced that the slugger had sustained severe damage to his cheek bone and the retina of his eye. Conigliaro missed the remainder of the 1967 season and, as Boston held its breath for their young phenom, memories of the long drought of being a winning team in baseball had crept over the Fenway crowd. (No mentions of a curse, however. The idea of the "Curse of the Bambino" would not be entertained for another 20 years.)

Though their young All-Star was out indefinitely, the Red Sox won the game and continued on to win the American League Championship. However, faith from Red Sox fans had to be found without Conigliaro. He would return a year later, and earn Comeback Player of the Year Award in 1969. In 1970, he would reach career-high numbers in HRs (36) and RBI (116). Problems with Conigliaro's eyesight returned in 1971 and he had to retire from major league baseball following a stint with the California Angels that year. His eyesight improved to the point that he attempted—and briefly succeeded—in a comeback attempt with the Red Sox during the spring of 1975. However following an early season injury he was replaced in the lineup by rookie and future Hall-of-Famer Jim Rice, and was released shortly thereafter, never to return to professional baseball.

=== Carl Yastrzemski ===
During the "impossible dream" of 1967, Red Sox slugger and the 1963 batting champion, Carl Yastrzemski, led the Red Sox in his break-out season, transforming his young career and elevating himself from All-Star to Most Valuable Player. "Yaz" led the Red Sox in batting average, hits, home runs, runs batted in, on-base percentage, slugging percentage, on-base + slugging, games played, at bat appearances, runs scored, total bases, doubles, base on balls (walks) and extra base hits. He was also named to his fourth All-Star Game, which was the third straight year he received this honor.

All of these team categories in which he led the club were overshadowed by his accomplishments in offensive statistics league-wide. Yastrzemski batted .326 on the season, slugged 44 home runs, and drove in 121 RBIs, which led the American League in all three of these main offensive categories (Yastrzemski was actually tied in the home run category with Harmon Killebrew of the Minnesota Twins). In leading the league in home runs, RBIs, and batting average, Yastrzemski achieved the Triple Crown. Only one Red Sox player in history had reached this milestone—Ted Williams, who did it twice, in 1942 and 1947. It was the second consecutive year that the Triple Crown was achieved in the American League, Frank Robinson having won the honor in 1966 during his first year with the Baltimore Orioles. It took 45 years before another triple crown was won, by Miguel Cabrera of the Detroit Tigers in 2012. In the scope of this season that had begun with low expectations for the Boston Red Sox, the leadership and outstanding batting by Yastrzemski added to the "impossible" feeling that the season overall had overwhelmed the New England region.

Yastrzemski ended the season with numerous awards and honors: 1967 All-Star, 1967 Most Valuable Player, 1967 Outfield Gold Glove, 1967 Major League Player of the Year. Statistically, Yastrzemski dominated the American League, as he had his own team. He led the league in: batting average, runs batted in, home runs, runs, slugging percentage, on-base plus slugging, hits, on-base percentage, and total bases.

=== The setting ===
Red Sox second baseman Mike Andrews says of the times: "This chaotic war was going on while we were playing baseball. To think that baseball could be meaningful to these wounded soldiers was unbelievable." Four Red Sox players—All-Stars Jim Lonborg and Tony Conigliaro, along with Dalton Jones and Bill Landis—were drafted for military service. The four served two-week stints in the military reserve.

=== Season summary ===
==== Early games ====
As a 21-year-old rookie, Billy Rohr made his first start on April 14 at Yankee Stadium facing Whitey Ford. He was one strike away from a no-hitter when Elston Howard, who would join the Red Sox later that season, hit a soft single into right-center field. Yastrzemski had saved Rohr's no-hit bid earlier in the game when he made an over-the-shoulder running-away catch deep in left field off the bat of Tom Tresh. Following Howard's single, Rohr proceeded to retire the next batter for a 3–0 shutout. Four days later at Fenway Park, he beat the Yankees again, 6–1. Mel Stottlemyre was charged with the loss. However Rohr only won one more major league game and was out of the majors after the 1968 season.

==== August ====
Right out of the gate, the Red Sox showed contender capabilities and entering August, were only two and a half games behind the league-leading Chicago White Sox and were eight games over .500. By month's end, the White Sox lost hold of first-place and on August 26, the Red Sox sat atop the American League at 72–56. A five-way race between the Red Sox, White Sox, Detroit Tigers, Minnesota Twins, and the California Angels developed for the American League pennant. The Angels slumped in early September to fall out of the race, and the White Sox slumped in the next to last week of the season.

==== Down the stretch ====
Starting September—the last month of the season—the Red Sox sat atop of the American League, but were caught in a dog-fight with Chicago, Minnesota and Detroit. The four teams were separated by half a game and all jumped between first to fourth sporadically. The pennant race was coming down to the last weekend of the season. Unfortunately for the White Sox, a three-game sweep at the hands of the Washington Senators left Chicago three games out of first place and the pennant scramble became a three-team race. The Red Sox faced the Twins in a two-game series at Fenway Park on that last weekend. The Twins were in first place, ahead by one game over the Red Sox. To win the pennant, the Red Sox had to sweep the Twins while the Detroit Tigers, playing the California Angels, would have to lose at least one more game.

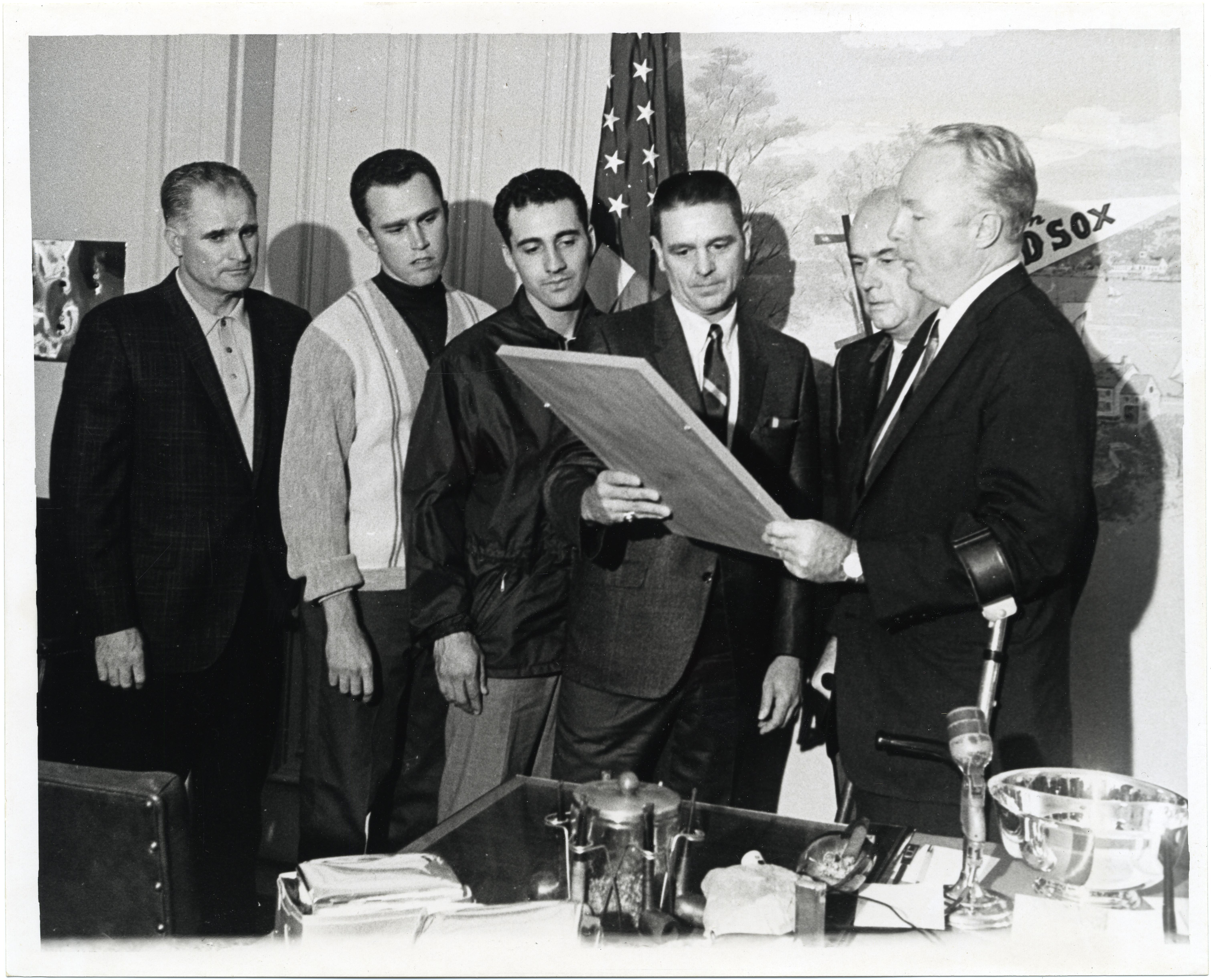
From left: Coach Bobby Doerr, Dalton Jones, Rico Petrocelli, Manager Dick Williams, Red Sox VP Dick O'Connell, Mayor John F. Collins

Carl Yastrzemski, vying for the triple crown, led the American League in batting average and RBI, and shared the home run lead with Harmon Killebrew of the Twins. Both players hit one home run in the series, so Yastrzemski won the triple crown. Yastrzemski went 7 for 8 with a home run and 6 RBI in the two-game series. In the last game of the season, 21-game winner Jim Lonborg got the start for the Red Sox vs. the Twins' 20-game winner Dean Chance. The Red Sox won the game 5–3 with a five-run sixth inning, and Lonborg finished the season with 22 victories. Afterwards, the Red Sox were forced to watch the second game of the Tigers-Angels doubleheader in the clubhouse. In Detroit, the Tigers won the first game of a double header vs. the Angels, and needed to win the second game to tie the Red Sox for first place. But their bullpen failed, and the Angels' Rick Reichardt hit a home run in an 8–5 Angel win. The Red Sox had won their first American League pennant in 21 years. Mayor of Boston John F. Collins declared October 3, the day before the start of the World Series, as "Boston Red Sox Day".

==== Aftermath ====
Although the Red Sox did not complete the unbelievable task and lost to the St. Louis Cardinals in the 1967 World Series, the overachieving club is considered among the greatest Red Sox teams in club history. Beyond Yastrzemski completing one of the best single season offensive campaigns, Red Sox players dominated the American League across the board. Pitcher Jim Lonborg won the Cy Young Award. The two Sox All-Stars, joined by Tony Conigliaro and Rico Petrocelli, comprised the four Red Sox named to the American League All-Star team.

=== Season standings ===
American League
Team	W	L	Pct.	GB	Home	Road
Boston Red Sox	92	70	.568	—	49‍–‍32	43‍–‍38
Detroit Tigers	91	71	.562	1	52‍–‍29	39‍–‍42
Minnesota Twins	91	71	.562	1	52‍–‍29	39‍–‍42
Chicago White Sox	89	73	.549	3	49‍–‍33	40‍–‍40
California Angels	84	77	.522	7½	53‍–‍30	31‍–‍47
Washington Senators	76	85	.472	15½	40‍–‍40	36‍–‍45
Baltimore Orioles	76	85	.472	15½	35‍–‍42	41‍–‍43
Cleveland Indians	75	87	.463	17	36‍–‍45	39‍–‍42
New York Yankees	72	90	.444	20	43‍–‍38	29‍–‍52
Kansas City Athletics	62	99	.385	29½	37‍–‍44	25‍–‍55

=== Record vs. opponents ===
1967 American League record Sources:
Team	BAL	BOS	CAL	CWS	CLE	DET	KCA	MIN	NYY	WAS
Baltimore	—	10–8	6–11	7–11	9–9	3–15	10–8	8–10	13–5	10–8
Boston	8–10	—	10–8	8–10	13–5	11–7	12–6	7–11	12–6	11–7
California	11–6	8–10	—	7–11	14–4	8–10	14–4	7–11	9–9	6–12
Chicago	11–7	10–8	11–7	—	12–6	8–10	8–10	9–9	12–6	8–10
Cleveland	9–9	5–13	4–14	6–12	—	8–10	11–7	10–8	9–9	13–5
Detroit	15–3	7–11	10–8	10–8	10–8	—	12–6	8–10–1	10–8	9–9
Kansas City	8–10	6–12	4–14	10–8	7–11	6–12	—	8–10	7–11	6–11
Minnesota	10–8	11–7	11–7	9–9	8–10	10–8–1	10–8	—	12–6–1	10–8
New York	5–13	6–12	9–9	6–12	9–9	8–10	11–7	6–12–1	—	12–6
Washington	8–10	7–11	12–6	10–8	5–13	9–9	11–6	8–10	6–12	—

=== Opening Day lineup ===
12	José Tartabull	CF
1	Joe Foy	3B
8	Carl Yastrzemski	LF
25	Tony Conigliaro	RF
5	George Scott	1B
7	Reggie Smith	2B
6	Rico Petrocelli	SS
22	Mike Ryan	C
16	Jim Lonborg	P

=== Notable transactions ===
- June 2, 1967: Don McMahon and minor leaguer Bob Snow were traded by the Red Sox to the Chicago White Sox for Jerry Adair.
- June 4, 1967: Don Demeter and Tony Horton were traded by the Red Sox to the Cleveland Indians for Gary Bell.
- June 6, 1967: Mike Garman was drafted by the Red Sox in the 1st round (3rd pick) of the 1967 Major League Baseball draft. Player signed June 9, 1967.
- June 28, 1967: Left-hander Dennis Bennett is traded to the New York Mets for outfielder Al Yates (assigned to Triple-A Toronto) and cash. The Red Sox use Bennett's roster spot to recall rookie southpaw Sparky Lyle from Toronto.
- July 15, 1967: Norm Siebern was purchased by the Red Sox from the San Francisco Giants.
- August 3, 1967: Pete Magrini and a player to be named later were traded by the Red Sox to the New York Yankees for Elston Howard. The Red Sox completed the deal by sending Ron Klimkowski to the Yankees on August 8.
- August 22, 1967: Outfielder Jim Landis, 33, released by the Detroit Tigers four days earlier, is signed as an emergency replacement for the injured Tony Conigliaro, placed on the disabled list for the remainder of the season.
- August 25, 1967: Outfielder Ken Harrelson is signed as a free agent and Jim Landis is released. Harrelson, 25, was summarily released by the Kansas City Athletics on August 22 for publicly calling owner Charles O. Finley a "menace to baseball".

=== Roster ===
1967 Boston Red Sox
Roster
Pitchers: 39 Gary Bell; 28 Dennis Bennett; 27 Bucky Brandon; 36 Ken Brett; 39, 40 Galen Cisco; 21, 38 Hank Fischer; 29 Bill Landis; 16 Jim Lonborg; 15, 28 Sparky Lyle; 44 Don McMahon; 17 Dave Morehead; 37 Dan Osinski; 15 Billy Rohr; 30 José Santiago; 20 Lee Stange; 18, 38 Jerry Stephenson; 19 Gary Waslewski; 26 John Wyatt	Catchers: 35 Russ Gibson; 18 Elston Howard; 22 Mike Ryan; 10 Bob Tillman; Infielders: 14 Jerry Adair; 2 Mike Andrews; 1 Joe Foy; 11 Tony Horton; 3 Dalton Jones; 6 Rico Petrocelli; 17 Ken Poulsen; 5 George Scott; 4 Norm Siebern	Outfielders: 25 Tony Conigliaro; 4 Don Demeter; 40 Ken Harrelson; 15 Jim Landis; 7 Reggie Smith; 12 José Tartabull; 24 George Thomas; 8 Carl Yastrzemski	Manager: 23 Dick Williams; Coaches: 31 Bobby Doerr (First base & Hitting); 34 Al Lakeman (Bullpen); 33 Sal Maglie (Pitching); 32 Eddie Popowski (Third base)

== Game log ==
=== Regular season ===
Legend
	Red Sox win
	Red Sox loss
	Postponement
	Clinched pennant
**Bold**	Red Sox team member

1967 regular season game log: 92–70 (Home: 49–32; Away: 43–38)
April: 8–6 (Home: 5–3; Away: 3–3)

#	Date	Time (ET)	Opponent	Score	Win	Loss	Save	Time of Game	Attendance	Record	Box/ Streak
—	April 11		White Sox	Postponed (cold); Makeup: April 13							
	April 12	1:30 p.m. EST	White Sox	**W** 5–4	**Lonborg** (1–0)	Buzhardt (0–1)	**McMahon** (1)	3:14	8,324	1–0	W1
2	April 13	1:30 p.m. EST	White Sox	L 5–8	Lamabe (1–0)	**Fischer** (0–1)	Locker (1)	3:00	3,607	1–1	L1
3	April 14		@ Yankees	3–0	**Rohr** (1–0)	Ford (0–1)			14,375	2–1	
4	April 15		@ Yankees	1–0	Stottlemyre (2–0)	**Bennett** (0–1)			12,035	2–2	
5	April 16		@ Yankees	7–6 (18)	Downing (1–0)	**Stange** (0–1)			19,290	2–3	
6	April 18	2:15 p.m. EST	@ White Sox	L 2–5	Howard (1–0)	**Brandon** (0–1)	—	2:18	1,613	2–4	L3
7	April 21		Yankees	6–1	**Rohr** (2–0)	Stottlemyre (2–1)			25,603	3–4	
8	April 22		Yankees	5–4	**Santiago** (1–0)	Womack (0–1)	**McMahon** (2)		8,189	4–4	
9	April 23		Yankees	7–5	Downing (2–0)	**Santiago** (1–1)			18,041	4–5	
10	April 24		@ Senators	7–4	**Wyatt** (1–0)	Lines (0–1)			2,235	5–5	
11	April 25		@ Senators	9–3	**Fischer** (1–1)	Richert (0–3)			3,367	6–5	
12	April 28		Athletics	3–0	**Lonborg** (2–0)	Hunter (2–1)			9,026	7–5	
13	April 29		Athletics	11–10 (15)	**McMahon** (1–0)	Aker (2–1)			9,724	8–5	
14	April 30		Athletics	1–0	Nash (2–2)	**Brandon** (0–2)			31,450	8–6	

May: 14–14 (Home: 8–5; Away: 6–9)

#	Date	Time (ET)	Opponent	Score	Win	Loss	Save	Time of Game	Attendance	Record	Box/ Streak
15	May 1	11:00 p.m. EDT	@ Angels	**W** 4–0	**Bennett** (1–1)	Rubio (0–2)	—	2:18	8,956	9–6	W1
16	May 2	11:00 p.m. EDT	@ Angels	L 2–3	McGlothlin (1–0)	**Fischer** (1–2)	—	1:57	8,167	9–7	L1
17	May 3	11:00 p.m. EDT	@ Angels	L 1–2	Kelso (2–0)	**Lonborg** (2–1)	—	2:13	8,880	9–8	L2
18	May 5	9:00 p.m. EDT	@ Twins	L 2–5	Grant (1–3)	**Rohr** (2–1)	Worthington (3)	2:29	9,893	9–9	L3
19	May 6	2:30 p.m. EDT	@ Twins	L 2–4	Chance (4–1)	**Brandon** (0–3)	—	2:06	11,595	9–10	L4
20	May 7	2:30 p.m. EDT	@ Twins	**W** 9–6	**Osinski** (1–0)	Perry (0–2)	**Wyatt** (1)	3:03	11,864	10–10	W1
21	May 9		@ Athletics	4–3	Krausse (1–4)	**McMahon** (1–1)	Aker (4)			10–11	
22	May 9		@ Athletics	5–2	**Wyatt** (2–0)	Aker (2–2)	**Osinski** (1)		7,708	11–11	
23	May 10		@ Athletics	7–4	Lindblad (1–0)	**Stange** (0–2)			4,996	11–12	
24	May 12	7:30 p.m. EDT	Tigers	4–5	Wilson (4–2)	**Brandon** (0–4)	Gladding (5)	2:44	15,564	11–13	L2
25	May 13	2:00 p.m. EDT	Tigers	8–10	Korince (1–0)	**Wyatt** (2–1)	Wickersham (2)	3:13	9,606	11–14	L3
26	May 14 (1)	1:00 p.m. EDT	Tigers	8–5	**Lonborg** (3–1)	McLain (3–4)	**Fischer** (1)	2:29	—	12–14	W1
27	May 14 (2)	4:04 p.m. EDT	Tigers	13–9	**Santiago** (2–1)	Lolich (4–2)	**Cisco** (1)	3:03	16,436	13–14	W2
28	May 16		Orioles	8–5	Fisher (2–1)	**Wyatt** (2–2)	Miller (4)		9,510	13–15	
29	May 17		Orioles	12–8	Dillman (2–0)	**Cisco** (0–1)	Drabowsky (2)		8,714	13–16	
30	May 19		Indians	3–2	**Lonborg** (4–1)	Bell (1–3)			15,534	14–16	
31	May 20		Indians	5–3 (10)	Bailey (1–0)	**McMahon** (1–2)			8,994	14–17	
32	May 21		Indians	4–3	**Wyatt** (3–2)	Siebert (3–3)	**Stange** (1)			15–17	
33	May 21		Indians	6–2	**Brandon** (1–4)	McDowell (2–2)			24,976	16–17	
34	May 23	8:00 p.m. EDT	@ Tigers	5–2	**Bennett** (2–1)	Lolich (5–3)	**Wyatt** (2)	2:36	7,570	17–17	W3
35	May 24	8:00 p.m. EDT	@ Tigers	1–0	**Lonborg** (5–1)	McLain (4–5)	—	2:31	9,890	18–17	W4
36	May 25	8:00 p.m. EDT	@ Tigers	3–9	Wilson (6–3)	**Santiago** (2–2)	—	2:20	8,782	18–18	L1
37	May 26		@ Orioles	4–3	Drabowsky (3–0)	**Rohr** (2–2)			13,786	18–19	
38	May 27		@ Orioles	10–0	Phoebus (3–1)	**Brandon** (1–5)			26,488	18–20	
39	May 28		@ Orioles	4–3	**Lonborg** (6–1)	Barber (3–5)	**Wyatt** (3)		14,071	19–20	
40	May 30 (1)	1:00 p.m. EDT	Angels	**W** 5–4	**Osinski** (2–0)	Kelso (2–1)	**Wyatt** (4)	2:45	—	20–20	W2
41	May 30 (2)	4:20 p.m. EDT	Angels	**W** 6–1	**Bennett** (3–1)	Brunet (1–8)	—	2:06	32,012	21–20	W3
42	May 31	7:30 p.m. EDT	Twins	**W** 3–2	**Brandon** (2–5)	Perry (0–3)	**Wyatt** (5)	2:11	12,335	22–20	W4

June: 15–14 (Home: 7–6; Away: 8–8)

#	Date	Time (ET)	Opponent	Score	Win	Loss	Save	Time of Game	Attendance	Record	Box/ Streak
43	June 1	1:30 p.m. EDT	Twins	L 0–4	Chance (9–2)	**Rohr** (2–3)	—	2:09	12,233	22–21	L1
44	June 2		@ Indians	2–1	**Lonborg** (7–1)	Siebert (4–4)			8,809	23–21	
45	June 3		@ Indians	6–2	**Bennett** (4–1)	Bell (1–5)	**Santiago** (1)		5,816	24–21	
46	June 4		@ Indians	3–0	Hargan (7–4)	**Stange** (0–3)			27,395	24–22	
47	June 6	9:00 p.m. EDT	@ White Sox	L 3–5	Wilhelm (3–1)	**Brandon** (2–6)	Wood (1)	2:52	White Sox Park	24–23	L2
—	June 7		@ White Sox	Postponed (rain); Makeup: June 8							
—	June 7		@ White Sox	Postponed (rain); Makeup: August 25							
48	June 8 (1)	2:15 p.m. EDT	@ White Sox	L 2–5	Horlen (7–0)	**Bennett** (4–2)	—	2:18	—	24–24	L3
49	June 8 (2)	5:08 p.m. EDT	@ White Sox	**W** 7–3	**Bell** (2–5)	Howard (1–4)	—	2:40	4,748	25–24	W1
50	June 9		Senators	8–7	**Santiago** (3–2)	Humphreys (1–1)	**Wyatt** (6)		25,326	26–24	
51	June 10		Senators	7–3	Pascual (6–3)	**Stange** (0–4)	Baldwin (5)		15,634	26–25	
52	June 11		Senators	4–3	**Santiago** (4–2)	Baldwin (0–1)	**Wyatt** (7)			27–25	
53	June 11		Senators	8–7	Cox (1–0)	**Osinski** (2–1)	Priddy (2)		16,599	27–26	
54	June 12		Yankees	3–1	**Bell** (3–5)	Verbanic (2–1)			18,939	28–26	
55	June 13		Yankees	5–3	Talbot (3–2)	**Lonborg** (7–2)	Womack (5)		17,190	28–27	
56	June 14 (1)	5:00 p.m. EDT	White Sox	L 7–8	Peters (8–3)	**Bennett** (4–3)	Wood (3)	3:03	—	28–28	L2
57	June 14 (2)	8:38 p.m. EDT	White Sox	**W** 6–1	**Stange** (1–4)	Klages (0–1)	**Santiago** (2)	2:30	22,178	29–28	W1
58	June 15	7:30 p.m. EDT	White Sox	**W** 2–1 (11)	**Wyatt** (4–2)	Buzhardt (2–6)	—	3:22	16,775	30–28	W2
59	June 16		@ Senators	1–0	Priddy (1–3)	**Bell** (3–6)	Baldwin (6)			30–29	
60	June 16		@ Senators	4–3	Cox (2–0)	**Wyatt** (4–3)			8,820	30–30	
61	June 17		@ Senators	5–1	**Lonborg** (8–2)	Moore (3–4)			3,944	31–30	
62	June 18		@ Senators	3–2 (10)	Knowles (4–5)	**Santiago** (4–3)			28,776	31–31	
63	June 20		@ Yankees	7–1	**Bell** (4–6)	Stottlemyre (6–7)			8,739	32–31	
64	June 21		@ Yankees	8–1	**Lonborg** (9–2)	Tillotson (3–3)			13,061	33–31	
65	June 23		Indians	8–4	**Stange** (2–4)	Siebert (6–7)			30,233	34–31	
66	June 24		Indians	3–2	Hargan (9–6)	**Brandon** (2–7)			30,027	34–32	
67	June 25		Indians	8–3	**Bell** (5–6)	Tiant (6–2)	**Santiago** (3)		23,719	35–32	
68	June 26	9:00 p.m. EDT	@ Twins	L 1–2	Kaat (5–8)	**Lonborg** (9–3)	Worthington (10)	2:39	13,701	35–33	L1
69	June 27	9:00 p.m. EDT	@ Twins	**W** 3–2	**Waslewski** (1–0)	Chance (10–6)	**Wyatt** (8)	2:16	18,711	36–33	W1
70	June 28	9:00 p.m. EDT	@ Twins	L 2–3	Boswell (5–5)	**Stange** (2–5)	—	2:25	11,940	36–34	L1
71	June 30		@ Athletics	5–3	**Bell** (6–6)	Nash (8–7)	**Wyatt** (9)		8,629	37–34	

July: 19–10 (Home: 9–5; Away: 10–5)

#	Date	Time (ET)	Opponent	Score	Win	Loss	Save	Time of Game	Attendance	Record	Box/ Streak
72	July 1		@ Athletics	10–2	**Lonborg** (10–3)	Dobson (4–5)	**Santiago** (4)		12,951	38–34	
73	July 2		@ Athletics	2–1	**Waslewski** (2–0)	Hunter (8–6)	**Wyatt** (10)		9,264	39–34	
74	July 3	11:00 p.m. EDT	@ Angels	**W** 9–3	**Stange** (3–5)	Hamilton (1–1)	—	2:36	17,005	40–34	W4
75	July 4	4:00 p.m. EDT	@ Angels	L 3–4	Clark (6–6)	**Bell** (6–7)	Rojas (13)	2:51	39,673	40–35	L1 Archived December 23, 2024, at the Wayback Machine
76	July 5	11:00 p.m. EDT	@ Angels	L 3–4	Brunet (6–11)	**Santiago** (4–4)	—	2:24	12,080	40–36	L2
77	July 7	8:00 p.m. EDT	@ Tigers	4–5 (11)	Marshall (1–1)	**Wyatt** (4–4)	—	3:44	27,213	40–37	L3
78	July 8	1:15 p.m. EDT	@ Tigers	0–2	McLain (10–9)	**Stange** (3–6)	—	2:14	19,481	40–38	L4
79	July 9 (1)	1:30 p.m. EDT	@ Tigers	4–10	Wilson (10–7)	**Bell** (6–8)	Marshall (4)	2:48	—	40–39	L5
80	July 9 (2)	4:53 p.m. EDT	@ Tigers	3–0	**Lonborg** (11–3)	Wickersham (4–2)	**Wyatt** (11)	2:10	48,266	41–39	W1
ASG	July 11	7:15 p.m. EDT	All-Star Game in Anaheim, CA	NL 2 – 1 AL (15)	—	—	—	3:41	46,309	—	ASG
81	July 13		Orioles	4–2	**Stange** (4–6)	Phoebus (7–4)	**Wyatt** (12)		19,171	42–39	
82	July 13		Orioles	10–0	McNally (6–5)	**Bell** (6–9)			23,111	42–40	
83	July 14		Orioles	11–5	**Lonborg** (12–3)	Adamson (0–1)	**Wyatt** (13)		27,787	43–40	
84	July 15		Orioles	5–1	**Santiago** (5–4)	Richert (5–10)	**Bell** (1)		16,025	44–40	
85	July 16	2:00 p.m. EDT	Tigers	9–5	**Brandon** (3–7)	Sparma (9–3)	**Lyle** (1)	2:28	28,237	45–40	W3
86	July 17	7:30 p.m. EDT	Tigers	7–1	**Stange** (5–6)	McLain (10–11)	—	2:08	28,991	46–40	W4
87	July 18		@ Orioles	6–2	**Lonborg** (13–3)	McNally (6–6)			14,409	47–40	
88	July 19		@ Orioles	6–4	**Santiago** (6–4)	Richert (6–11)			12,154	48–40	
89	July 21		@ Indians	6–2	**Brandon** (4–7)	Tiant (7–5)			10,893	49–40	
90	July 22		@ Indians	4–0	**Stange** (6–6)	Hargan (9–8)			7,990	50–40	
91	July 23		@ Indians	8–5	**Lonborg** (14–3)	O'Donoghue (5–3)				51–40	
92	July 23		@ Indians	5–1	**Bell** (7–9)	Tiant (7–6)			13,786	52–40	
93	July 25	7:30 p.m. EDT	Angels	L 4–6	Newman (1–0)	**Waslewski** (2–1)	—	3:10	21,527	52–41	L1
94	July 26	7:30 p.m. EDT	Angels	**W** 9–6	**Landis** (1–0)	Rojas (7–6)	**Wyatt** (14)	2:40	32,403	53–41	W1
95	July 27	1:30 p.m. EDT	Angels	**W** 6–5 (10)	**Lyle** (1–0)	Kelso (4–3)	—	2:38	34,193	54–41	W2 Archived December 23, 2024, at the Wayback Machine
96	July 28	7:30 p.m. EDT	Twins	L 2–9	Chance (12–8)	**Lonborg** (14–4)	—	2:20	33,075	54–42	L1
97	July 29 (1)	5:00 p.m. EDT	Twins	**W** 6–3	**Wyatt** (5–4)	Worthington (6–6)	**Santiago** (5)	2:35	—	55–42	W1
98	July 29 (2)	8:10 p.m. EDT	Twins	L 3–10	Perry (3–5)	**Waslewski** (2–2)	—	2:39	35,469	55–43	L1
99	July 30	2:00 p.m. EDT	Twins	L 5–7	Merritt (7–3)	**Brandon** (4–8)	Roland (2)	2:45	24,459	55–44	L2
100	July 31	1:30 p.m. EDT	Twins	**W** 4–0	**Stange** (7–6)	Boswell (8–8)	—	2:15	22,605	56–44	W1

August: 20–15 (Home: 12–5; Away: 8–10)

#	Date	Time (ET)	Opponent	Score	Win	Loss	Save	Time of Game	Attendance	Record	Box/ Streak
101	August 1		Athletics	4–3	Dobson (7–6)	**Morehead** (0–1)				56–45	
102	August 1		Athletics	8–3	**Lonborg** (15–4)	Sanford (4–4)	**Lyle** (2)		26,750	57–45	
103	August 2		Athletics	8–6	Segui (2–3)	**Wyatt** (5–5)	Krausse (2)		24,581	57–46	
104	August 3		Athletics	5–3	**Morehead** (1–1)	Hunter (9–11)	**Wyatt** (15)		18,920	58–46	
105	August 4	9:00 p.m. EDT	@ Twins	0–3	Merritt (8–3)	**Brandon** (4–9)	—	2:30	31,645	58–47	L1
106	August 5	2:30 p.m. EDT	@ Twins	1–2	Boswell (9–8)	**Stange** (7–7)	—	2:11	26,003	58–48	L2
107	August 6	2:30 p.m. EDT	@ Twins	0–2 (5)	Chance (14–8)	**Lonborg** (15–5)	—	2:11	26,003	58–49	L3
108	August 7		@ Athletics	5–3	Hunter (10–11)	**Morehead** (1–2)	Aker (12)			58–50	
109	August 8		@ Athletics	7–5	**Wyatt** (6–5)	Stafford (0–1)	**Brandon** (1)		13,125	59–50	
110	August 9		@ Athletics	5–1	**Lonborg** (16–5)	Nash (10–11)	**Lyle** (3)		7,313	60–50	
111	August 11	11:00 p.m. EDT	@ Angels	L 0–1	McGlothlin (10–4)	**Stange** (7–8)	—	2:14	26,773	60–51	L1
112	August 12	11:00 p.m. EDT	@ Angels	L 1–2	Hamilton (6–2)	**Bell** (7–10)	Rojas (21)	2:16	32,821	60–52	L2
113	August 13	4:00 p.m. EDT	@ Angels	L 2–3	Clark (9–8)	**Lonborg** (16–6)	Kelso (9)	2:34	22,008	60–53	L3
114	August 15	7:30 p.m. EDT	Tigers	4–0	**Morehead** (2–2)	Sparma (12–5)	—	2:08	27,125	61–53	W1
115	August 16	7:30 p.m. EDT	Tigers	8–3	**Brandon** (5–9)	McLain (15–13)	—	2:43	32,051	62–53	W2
116	August 17	1:30 p.m. EDT	Tigers	4–7 (10)	Gladding (4–4)	**Lyle** (1–1)	—	3:20	28,653	62–54	L1
117	August 18	7:30 p.m. EDT	Angels	**W** 3–2	**Bell** (8–10)	Hamilton (6–3)	—	2:16	31,027	63–54	W1
118	August 19	2:00 p.m. EDT	Angels	**W** 12–11	**Osinski** (3–1)	Coates (0–2)	**Stephenson** (1)	3:35	24,117	64–54	W2
119	August 20 (1)	1:00 p.m. EDT	Angels	**W** 12–2	**Stange** (8–8)	Brunet (11–15)	—	3:14	—	65–54	W3
120	August 20 (2)	4:49 p.m. EDT	Angels	**W** 9–8	**Santiago** (7–4)	Rojas (9–8)	—	3:19	33,840	66–54	W4
121	August 21		Senators	6–5	**Wyatt** (7–5)	Knowles (5–7)			26,018	67–54	
122	August 22		Senators	2–1	**Stephenson** (1–0)	Ortega (9–6)	**Wyatt** (16)			68–54	
123	August 22		Senators	5–3	**Bell** (9–10)	Cox (6–2)	**Brandon** (2)		30,994	69–54	
124	August 23		Senators	3–2	Priddy (2–5)	**Lyle** (1–2)			33,680	69–55	
125	August 24		Senators	7–5	**Morehead** (3–2)	Nold (0–2)	**Wyatt** (17)		31,283	70–55	
126	August 25 (1)	7:00 p.m. EDT	@ White Sox	**W** 7–1	**Lonborg** (17–6)	Peters (14–7)	—	2:25	—	71–55	W2
127	August 25 (2)	10:00 p.m. EDT	@ White Sox	L 1–2	Locker (6–3)	**Wyatt** (7–6)	—	2:40	34,580	71–56	L1
128	August 26	7:30 p.m. EDT	@ White Sox	**W** 6–2	**Stephenson** (2–0)	Horlen (14–5)	**Brandon** (3)	2:51	12,391	72–56	W1
129	August 27 (1)	2:15 p.m. EDT	@ White Sox	**W** 4–3	**Bell** (10–10)	Klages (2–3)	**Wyatt** (18)	2:45	—	73–56	W2
130	August 27 (2)	5:35 p.m. EDT	@ White Sox	L 0–1 (11)	Peters (15–7)	**Brandon** (5–10)	—	2:36	22,352	73–57	L1
131	August 28		@ Yankees	3–0	**Morehead** (4–2)	Talbot (5–7)	**Lyle** (4)		27,296	74–57	
132	August 29		@ Yankees	2–1	**Lonborg** (18–6)	Stottlemyre (13–11)				75–57	
133	August 29		@ Yankees	4–3 (20)	Bouton (1–0)	**Brandon** (5–11)			40,314	75–58	
134	August 30		@ Yankees	2–1 (11)	**Wyatt** (8–6)	Downing (12–8)			22,766	76–58	
135	August 31	7:30 p.m. EDT	White Sox	L 2–4	McMahon (4–2)	**Bell** (10–11)	—	2:34	35,138	76–59	L1

September: 15–11 (Home: 7–8; Away: 8–3)

#	Date	Time (ET)	Opponent	Score	Win	Loss	Save	Time of Game	Attendance	Record	Box/ Streak
136	September 1	7:30 p.m. EDT	White Sox	**W** 10–2	**Santiago** (8–4)	Peters (15–8)	—	2:30	34,054	77–59	W1
137	September 2	2:00 p.m. EDT	White Sox	L 1–4	Horlen (15–6)	**Lonborg** (18–7)	—	2:46	28,222	77–60	L1
138	September 3	2:00 p.m. EDT	White Sox	L 0–4	John (9–9)	**Stange** (8–9)	—	2:28	29,818	77–61	L2
139	September 4		@ Senators	5–2	Pascual (12–10)	**Morehead** (4–3)	Knowles (12)			77–62	
140	September 4		@ Senators	6–4	**Stephenson** (3–0)	Lines (1–5)	**Wyatt** (19)		32,355	78–62	
141	September 5		@ Senators	8–2	**Bell** (11–11)	Bertaina (4–5)			9,093	79–62	
142	September 7		Yankees	3–1	**Lonborg** (19–7)	Stottlemyre (14–12)			28,738	80–62	
143	September 8		Yankees	5–2	Monbouquette (4–4)	**Stange** (8–10)	Verbanic (2)		33,534	80–63	
144	September 9		Yankees	7–1	**Morehead** (5–3)	Barber (9–16)	**Lyle** (5)		32,119	81–63	
145	September 10		Yankees	9–1	**Bell** (12–11)	Downing (13–9)			26,341	82–63	
146	September 12		Athletics	3–1	**Lonborg** (20–7)	Hunter (11–15)			27,976	83–63	
147	September 13		Athletics	4–2	**Wyatt** (9–6)	Aker (3–8)			12,257	84–63	
148	September 15		Orioles	6–2	Phoebus (13–8)	**Morehead** (5–4)	Drabowsky (11)		32,489	84–64	
149	September 16		Orioles	4–1	Hardin (7–2)	**Lonborg** (20–8)			27,219	84–65	
150	September 17		Orioles	5–2	Brabender (5–4)	**Bell** (12–12)	Miller (8)		30,301	84–66	
151	September 18	8:00 p.m. EDT	@ Tigers	6–5 (10)	**Santiago** (9–4)	Marshall (1–3)	—	3:22	42,674	85–66	W1
152	September 19	8:00 p.m. EDT	@ Tigers	4–2	**Santiago** (10–4)	Lolich (11–13)	**Bell** (2)	3:00	43,004	86–66	W2
153	September 20		@ Indians	5–4	**Wyatt** (10–6)	Culver (7–3)			6,603	87–66	
154	September 21		@ Indians	6–5	**Bell** (13–12)	Hargan (14–13)	**Wyatt** (20)		4,492	88–66	
155	September 22		@ Orioles	10–0	Hardin (8–2)	**Stephenson** (3–1)				88–67	
156	September 22		@ Orioles	10–3	**Santiago** (11–4)	Richert (9–16)			14,714	89–67	
157	September 23		@ Orioles	7–5	Miller (3–10)	**Wyatt** (10–7)			10,251	89–68	
158	September 24		@ Orioles	11–7	**Lonborg** (21–8)	Phoebus (14–9)	**Osinski** (2)		5,609	90–68	
159	September 26		Indians	6–3	Tiant (12–9)	**Bell** (13–13)			16,652	90–69	
160	September 27		Indians	6–0	Siebert (10–12)	**Lonborg** (21–9)	Williams (1)		18,415	90–70	
161	September 30	2:00 p.m. EDT	Twins	**W** 6–4	**Santiago** (12–4)	Kline (7–1)	**Bell** (3)	3:03	32,909	91–70	W1

October 1–0 (Home: 1–0; Away: 0–0)

#	Date	Time (ET)	Opponent	Score	Win	Loss	Save	Time of Game	Attendance	Record	Box/ Streak
162	October 1	2:00 p.m. EDT	Twins	**W** 5–3	**Lonborg** (22–9)	Chance (20–14)	—	2:25	35,770	92–70	W2

=== Detailed records ===
**American League**
Opponent	Home	Away	Total	Pct.	Runs scored	Runs allowed
Baltimore Orioles	3–6	5–4	8–10	.444	83	103
**Boston Red Sox**	—	—	—	—	—	—
California Angels	8–1	2–7	10–8	.556	91	67
Chicago White Sox	4–5	4–5	8–10	.444	70	63
Cleveland Indians	5–4	8–1	13–5	.722	79	57
Detroit Tigers	6–3	5–4	11–7	.611	95	80
Kansas City Athletics	6–3	6–3	12–6	.667	87	62
Minnesota Twins	5–4	2–7	7–11	.389	54	71
New York Yankees	6–3	6–3	12–6	.667	77	42
Washington Senators	6–3	5–4	11–7	.611	86	69
	**49–32**	**43–38**	**92–70**	**.568**	**722**	**614**

==== Month-by-Month ====
Month	Games	Won	Lost	Win %	RS	RA
April	14	8	6	0.571	67	55
May	28	14	14	0.500	124	129
June	29	15	14	0.517	117	95
July	29	19	10	0.655	148	115
August	35	20	15	0.571	145	111
September	26	15	11	0.577	116	106
October	1	1	0	1.000	5	3
Total	162	92	70	0.568	722	614

	Games	Won	Lost	Win %	RS	RA
Home	81	49	32	0.605	408	355
Road	81	43	39	0.524	314	259
Total	162	92	70	0.568	722	614

=== Composite Box ===
1967 Boston Red Sox Inning–by–Inning Boxscore
Team	1	2	3	4	5	6	7	8	9	10	11	12	13	14	15	16	17	18	19	20	R	H	E
Opponents	76	64	66	65	83	56	65	65	61	6	4	0	0	0	1	0	0	1	0	1	614	1333	149
Red Sox	88	77	71	66	95	90	95	67	65	2	4	0	0	0	2	0	0	0	0	0	722	1394	142

=== Postseason ===
Legend
	Red Sox win
	Red Sox loss
**Bold**	Red Sox team member

1967 Postseason game log: 3–4 (Home: 2–2; Away: 1–2)
World Series vs. St. Louis Cardinals 3–4 (Home: 2–2; Away 1–2)

#	Date	Time (ET)	Opponent	Score	Win	Loss	Save	Attendance	Time of Game	Series	Streak
1	October 4	1:00 p.m. EDT	Cardinals	1–2	Gibson (1–0)	**Santiago** (0–1)	—	34,796	2:22	STL 1–0	L1
2	October 5	1:00 p.m. EDT	Cardinals	5–0	**Lonborg** (1–0)	Hughes (0–1)	—	35,188	2:24	TIE 1–1	W1
3	October 7	2:00 p.m. EDT	@ Cardinals	2–5	Briles (1–0)	**Bell** (0–1)	—	54,575	2:15	STL 2–1	L1
4	October 8	2:00 p.m. EDT	@ Cardinals	0–6	Gibson (2–0)	**Santiago** (0–2)	—	54,575	2:05	STL 3–1	L2
5	October 9	2:00 p.m. EDT	@ Cardinals	3–1	**Lonborg** (2–0)	Carlton (0–1)	—	54,575	2:20	STL 3–2	W1
6	October 11	1:00 p.m. EDT	Cardinals	8–4	**Wyatt** (1–0)	Lamabe (0–1)	**Bell** (1)	35,188	2:48	TIE 3–3	W2
7	October 12	1:00 p.m. EDT	Cardinals	2–7	Gibson (3–0)	**Lonborg** (2–1)	—	35,188	2:23	STL 4–3	L1

== Starting Lineups ==
=== Regular Season ===
==== Batting Order ====
1967 Regular Season Batting Order game log
April

#	Date	Opponent	1st	2nd	3rd	4th	5th	6th	7th	8th	9th

May

#	Date	Opponent	1st	2nd	3rd	4th	5th	6th	7th	8th	9th
24	May 12	DET	#12; Tartabull (CF)	#1; Foy (3B)	#8; Yastrzemski (LF)	#5; Scott (1B)	#25; Conigliaro (RF)	#6; Petrocelli (SS)	#2; Andrews (2B)	#10; Tillman (C)	#27; Brandon (SP)
25	May 13	DET	#12; Tartabull (CF)	#1; Foy (3B)	#8; Yastrzemski (LF)	#5; Scott (1B)	#25; Conigliaro (RF)	#6; Petrocelli (SS)	#2; Andrews (2B)	#22; Ryan (C)	#28; Bennett (SP)
26	May 14	DET	#12; Tartabull (CF)	#1; Foy (3B)	#8; Yastrzemski (LF)	#5; Scott (1B)	#25; Conigliaro (RF)	#6; Petrocelli (SS)	#2; Andrews (2B)	#22; Ryan (C)	#16; Lonborg (SP)
27	May 14	DET	#12; Tartabull (CF)	#1; Foy (3B)	#8; Yastrzemski (LF)	#5; Scott (1B)	#25; Conigliaro (RF)	#6; Petrocelli (SS)	#4; Demeter (C)	#22; Ryan (C)	#30; Santiago (SP)
34	May 23	@ DET	#7; Smith (CF)	#2; Andrews (2B)	#8; Yastrzemski (LF)	#5; Scott (1B)	#4; Demeter (RF)	#6; Petrocelli (SS)	#1; Foy (3B)	#22; Ryan (C)	#28; Bennett (SP)
35	May 24	@ DET	#12; Tartabull (RF)	#7; Smith (CF)	#8; Yastrzemski (LF)	#5; Scott (1B)	#3; Jones (3B)	#6; Petrocelli (SS)	#2; Andrews (2B)	#22; Ryan (C)	#16; Lonborg (SP)
36	May 25	@ DET	#12; Tartabull (RF)	#7; Smith (CF)	#8; Yastrzemski (LF)	#5; Scott (1B)	#3; Jones (3B)	#6; Petrocelli (SS)	#2; Andrews (2B)	#22; Ryan (C)	#30; Santiago (SP)

June

#	Date	Opponent	1st	2nd	3rd	4th	5th	6th	7th	8th	9th

July

#	Date	Opponent	1st	2nd	3rd	4th	5th	6th	7th	8th	9th
77	July 7	@ DET	#2; Andrews (2B)	#1; Foy (3B)	#8; Yastrzemski (LF)	#25; Conigliaro (RF)	#5; Scott (1B)	#6; Petrocelli (SS)	#7; Smith (CF)	#10; Tillman (C)	#19; Waslewski (SP)
78	July 8	@ DET	#2; Andrews (2B)	#1; Foy (3B)	#8; Yastrzemski (LF)	#25; Conigliaro (RF)	#5; Scott (1B)	#6; Petrocelli (SS)	#7; Smith (CF)	#22; Ryan (C)	#20; Stange (SP)
79	July 9	@ DET	#2; Andrews (2B)	#1; Foy (3B)	#8; Yastrzemski (LF)	#25; Conigliaro (RF)	#5; Scott (1B)	#6; Petrocelli (SS)	#7; Smith (CF)	#22; Ryan (C)	#39; Bell (SP)
80	July 9	@ DET	#2; Andrews (2B)	#1; Foy (3B)	#8; Yastrzemski (LF)	#25; Conigliaro (RF)	#5; Scott (1B)	#14; Adair (SS)	#7; Smith (CF)	#35; Gibson (C)	#16; Lonborg (SP)
85	July 16	DET	#2; Andrews (2B)	#1; Foy (3B)	#8; Yastrzemski (LF)	#25; Conigliaro (RF)	#5; Scott (1B)	#14; Adair (SS)	#7; Smith (CF)	#22; Ryan (C)	#27; Brandon (SP)
86	July 17	DET	#2; Andrews (2B)	#1; Foy (3B)	#8; Yastrzemski (LF)	#25; Conigliaro (RF)	#5; Scott (1B)	#14; Adair (SS)	#7; Smith (CF)	#22; Ryan (C)	#20; Stange (SP)

August

#	Date	Opponent	1st	2nd	3rd	4th	5th	6th	7th	8th	9th
114	August 15	DET	#7; Smith (CF)	#1; Foy (3B)	#8; Yastrzemski (LF)	#5; Scott (1B)	#25; Conigliaro (RF)	#6; Petrocelli (SS)	#14; Adair (2B)	#18; Howard (C)	#17; Morehead (SP)
115	August 16	DET	#12; Tartabull (RF)	#1; Foy (3B)	#8; Yastrzemski (LF)	#5; Scott (1B)	#7; Smith (CF)	#6; Petrocelli (SS)	#14; Adair (2B)	#18; Howard (C)	#20; Stange (SP)
116	August 17	DET	#7; Smith (CF)	#1; Foy (3B)	#8; Yastrzemski (LF)	#5; Scott (1B)	#25; Conigliaro (RF)	#6; Petrocelli (SS)	#14; Adair (2B)	#22; Ryan (C)	#16; Lonborg (SP)

September

#	Date	Opponent	1st	2nd	3rd	4th	5th	6th	7th	8th	9th
151	September 18	@ DET	#12; Tartabull (RF)	#2; Andrews (2B)	#8; Yastrzemski (LF)	#7; Smith (CF)	#5; Scott (1B)	#3; Jones (3B)	#6; Petrocelli (SS)	#35; Gibson (C)	#38; Stephenson (SP)
152	September 19	@ DET	#2; Andrews (2B)	#3; Jones (3B)	#8; Yastrzemski (LF)	#5; Scott (1B)	#7; Smith (CF)	#40; Harrelson (RF)	#6; Petrocelli (SS)	#35; Gibson (C)	#20; Stange (SP)

October

#	Date	Opponent	1st	2nd	3rd	4th	5th	6th	7th	8th	9th

==== Defensive Lineup ====
1967 Regular Season Defensive Lineup game log
April

#	Date	Opponent	C	1B	2B	3B	SS	LF	CF	RF	P

May

#	Date	Opponent	C	1B	2B	3B	SS	LF	CF	RF	P
24	May 12	DET	#10; Tillman	#5; Scott	#2; Andrews	#1; Foy	#6; Petrocelli	#8; Yastrzemski	#12; Tartabull	#25; Conigliaro	#27; Brandon
25	May 13	DET	#22; Ryan	#5; Scott	#2; Andrews	#1; Foy	#6; Petrocelli	#8; Yastrzemski	#12; Tartabull	#25; Conigliaro	#28; Bennett
26	May 14	DET	#22; Ryan	#5; Scott	#2; Andrews	#1; Foy	#6; Petrocelli	#8; Yastrzemski	#12; Tartabull	#25; Conigliaro	#16; Lonborg
27	May 14	DET	#22; Ryan	#5; Scott	#4; Demeter	#1; Foy	#6; Petrocelli	#8; Yastrzemski	#12; Tartabull	#25; Conigliaro	#30; Santiago
34	May 23	@ DET	#22; Ryan	#5; Scott	#2; Andrews	#1; Foy	#6; Petrocelli	#8; Yastrzemski	#7; Smith	#4; Demeter	#28; Bennett
35	May 24	@ DET	#22; Ryan	#5; Scott	#2; Andrews	#3; Jones	#6; Petrocelli	#8; Yastrzemski	#7; Smith	#12; Tartabull	#16; Lonborg
36	May 25	@ DET	#22; Ryan	#5; Scott	#2; Andrews	#3; Jones	#6; Petrocelli	#8; Yastrzemski	#7; Smith	#12; Tartabull	#30; Santiago

June

#	Date	Opponent	C	1B	2B	3B	SS	LF	CF	RF	P

July

#	Date	Opponent	C	1B	2B	3B	SS	LF	CF	RF	P
77	July 7	@ DET	#10; Tillman	#5; Scott	#2; Andrews	#1; Foy	#6; Petrocelli	#8; Yastrzemski	#7; Smith	#25; Conigliaro	#19; Waslewski
78	July 8	@ DET	#22; Ryan	#5; Scott	#2; Andrews	#1; Foy	#6; Petrocelli	#8; Yastrzemski	#7; Smith	#25; Conigliaro	#20; Stange
79	July 9	@ DET	#22; Ryan	#5; Scott	#2; Andrews	#1; Foy	#6; Petrocelli	#8; Yastrzemski	#7; Smith	#25; Conigliaro	#39; Bell
80	July 9	@ DET	#35; Gibson	#5; Scott	#2; Andrews	#5; Scott	#14; Adair	#8; Yastrzemski	#7; Smith	#25; Conigliaro	#16; Lonborg
85	July 16	DET	#22; Ryan	#5; Scott	#2; Andrews	#5; Scott	#14; Adair	#8; Yastrzemski	#7; Smith	#25; Conigliaro	#27; Brandon
86	July 17	DET	#22; Ryan	#5; Scott	#2; Andrews	#5; Scott	#14; Adair	#8; Yastrzemski	#7; Smith	#25; Conigliaro	#20; Stange

August

#	Date	Opponent	C	1B	2B	3B	SS	LF	CF	RF	P
114	August 15	DET	#18; Howard	#5; Scott	#14; Adair	#1; Foy	#6; Petrocelli	#8; Yastrzemski	#7; Smith	#25; Conigliaro	#17; Morehead
115	August 16	DET	#18; Howard	#5; Scott	#14; Adair	#1; Foy	#6; Petrocelli	#8; Yastrzemski	#7; Smith	#12; Tartabull	#20; Stange
116	August 17	DET	#22; Ryan	#5; Scott	#14; Adair	#1; Foy	#6; Petrocelli	#8; Yastrzemski	#7; Smith	#25; Conigliaro	#16; Lonborg

September

#	Date	Opponent	C	1B	2B	3B	SS	LF	CF	RF	P
151	September 18	@ DET	#35; Gibson	#5; Scott	#2; Andrews	#3; Jones	#6; Petrocelli	#8; Yastrzemski	#7; Smith	#12; Tartabull	#38; Stephenson
152	September 19	@ DET	#35; Gibson	#5; Scott	#2; Andrews	#3; Jones	#6; Petrocelli	#8; Yastrzemski	#7; Smith	#40; Harrelson	#20; Stange

October

#	Date	Opponent	C	1B	2B	3B	SS	LF	CF	RF	P

=== Postseason ===
==== Batting Order ====
1967 Postseason Batting Order game log
World Series vs. St. Louis Cardinals

#	Date	Opponent	1st	2nd	3rd	4th	5th	6th	7th	8th	9th
1	October 4	STL	#14; Adair (2B)	#3; Jones (3B)	#8; Yastrzemski (LF)	#40; Harrelson (RF)	#5; Scott (1B)	#6; Petrocelli (SS)	#7; Smith (CF)	#35; Gibson (C)	#30; Santiago (SP)
2	October 5	STL	#12; Tartabull (RF)	#3; Jones (3B)	#8; Yastrzemski (LF)	#5; Scott (1B)	#7; Smith (CF)	#14; Adair (2B)	#6; Petrocelli (SS)	#18; Howard (C)	#16; Lonborg (SP)
3	October 7	@ STL	#12; Tartabull (RF)	#3; Jones (3B)	#8; Yastrzemski (LF)	#5; Scott (1B)	#7; Smith (CF)	#14; Adair (2B)	#6; Petrocelli (SS)	#18; Howard (C)	#39; Bell (SP)
4	October 8	@ STL	#12; Tartabull (RF)	#3; Jones (3B)	#8; Yastrzemski (LF)	#5; Scott (1B)	#7; Smith (CF)	#14; Adair (2B)	#6; Petrocelli (SS)	#18; Howard (C)	#30; Santiago (SP)
5	October 9	@ STL	#1; Foy (3B)	#2; Andrews (2B)	#8; Yastrzemski (LF)	#40; Harrelson (RF)	#5; Scott (1B)	#7; Smith (CF)	#6; Petrocelli (SS)	#18; Howard (C)	#16; Lonborg (SP)
6	October 11	STL	#1; Foy (3B)	#2; Andrews (2B)	#8; Yastrzemski (LF)	#40; Harrelson (RF)	#5; Scott (1B)	#7; Smith (CF)	#6; Petrocelli (SS)	#18; Howard (C)	#19; Waslewski (SP)
7	October 12	STL	#1; Foy (3B)	#2; Andrews (2B)	#8; Yastrzemski (LF)	#40; Harrelson (RF)	#5; Scott (1B)	#7; Smith (CF)	#6; Petrocelli (SS)	#18; Howard (C)	#16; Lonborg (SP)

==== Defensive Lineup ====
1967 Postseason Defensive Lineup game log
World Series vs. St. Louis Cardinals

#	Date	Opponent	C	1B	2B	3B	SS	LF	CF	RF	P
1	October 4	STL	#35; Gibson	#5; Scott	#14; Adair	#3; Jones	#6; Petrocelli	#8; Yastrzemski	#7; Smith	#40; Harrelson	#30; Santiago
2	October 5	STL	#18; Howard	#5; Scott	#14; Adair	#3; Jones	#6; Petrocelli	#8; Yastrzemski	#7; Smith	#12; Tartabull	#16; Lonborg
3	October 7	@ STL	#18; Howard	#5; Scott	#14; Adair	#3; Jones	#6; Petrocelli	#8; Yastrzemski	#7; Smith	#12; Tartabull	#39; Bell
4	October 8	@ STL	#18; Howard	#5; Scott	#14; Adair	#3; Jones	#6; Petrocelli	#8; Yastrzemski	#7; Smith	#12; Tartabull	#30; Santiago
5	October 9	@ STL	#18; Howard	#5; Scott	#2; Andrews	#1; Foy	#6; Petrocelli	#8; Yastrzemski	#7; Smith	#40; Harrelson	#16; Lonborg
6	October 11	STL	#18; Howard	#5; Scott	#2; Andrews	#1; Foy	#6; Petrocelli	#8; Yastrzemski	#7; Smith	#40; Harrelson	#19; Waslewski
7	October 12	STL	#18; Howard	#5; Scott	#2; Andrews	#1; Foy	#6; Petrocelli	#8; Yastrzemski	#7; Smith	#40; Harrelson	#16; Lonborg

== Game Umpires ==
=== Regular Season ===
1967 Regular Season Umpire game log
April

#	Date	Opponent	HP	1B	2B	3B

May

#	Date	Opponent	HP	1B	2B	3B
24	May 12	DET	Johnny Stevens (crew chief)	Marty Springstead	Bob Stewart	Bill Valentine
25	May 13	DET	Marty Springstead	Bob Stewart	Bill Valentine	Johnny Stevens (crew chief)
26	May 14	DET	Bob Stewart	Bill Valentine	Johnny Stevens (crew chief)	Marty Springstead
27	May 14	DET	Bill Valentine	Johnny Stevens (crew chief)	Marty Springstead	Bob Stewart
34	May 23	@ DET	Nestor Chylak	Cal Drummond	Bill Haller	Jim Honochick (crew chief)
35	May 24	@ DET	Cal Drummond	Bill Haller	Jim Honochick (crew chief)	Nestor Chylak
36	May 25	@ DET	Bill Haller	Jim Honochick (crew chief)	Nestor Chylak	Cal Drummond

June

#	Date	Opponent	HP	1B	2B	3B

July

#	Date	Opponent	HP	1B	2B	3B
77	July 7	@ DET	Bob Stewart	Bill Valentine	Marty Springstead	Johnny Stevens (crew chief)
78	July 8	@ DET	Bill Valentine	Marty Springstead	Johnny Stevens (crew chief)	Bob Stewart
79	July 9	@ DET	Marty Springstead	Johnny Stevens (crew chief)	Bob Stewart	Bill Valentine
80	July 9	@ DET	Johnny Stevens (crew chief)	Bob Stewart	Bill Valentine	Marty Springstead
85	July 16	DET	Nestor Chylak	Cal Drummond	Bill Haller	Jim Honochick (crew chief)
86	July 17	DET	Cal Drummond	Bill Haller	Jim Honochick (crew chief)	Nestor Chylak

August

#	Date	Opponent	HP	1B	2B	3B
114	August 15	DET	Bill Kinnamon	Larry Napp (crew chief)	Frank Umont	Bill Valentine
115	August 16	DET	Larry Napp (crew chief)	Frank Umont	Bill Valentine	Bill Kinnamon
116	August 17	DET	Frank Umont	Bill Valentine	Bill Kinnamon	Larry Napp (crew chief)

September

#	Date	Opponent	HP	1B	2B	3B
151	September 18	@ DET	Hank Soar (crew chief)	Ed Runge	Bill Haller	Jim Odom
152	September 19	@ DET	Ed Runge	Bill Haller	Jim Odom	Hank Soar (crew chief)

October

#	Date	Opponent	HP	1B	2B	3B

=== Postseason ===
1967 Postseason Umpire game log
World Series vs. St. Louis Cardinals

#	Date	Opponent	HP	1B	2B	3B	LF	RF
1	October 4	STL	Johnny Stevens (AL) (crew chief)	Al Barlick (NL)	Frank Umont (AL)	Augie Donatelli (NL)	Ed Runge (AL)	Paul Pryor (NL)
2	October 5	STL	Al Barlick (NL)	Frank Umont (AL)	Augie Donatelli (NL)	Ed Runge (AL)	Paul Pryor (NL)	Johnny Stevens (AL) (crew chief)
3	October 7	@ STL	Frank Umont (AL)	Augie Donatelli (NL)	Ed Runge (AL)	Paul Pryor (NL)	Johnny Stevens (AL) (crew chief)	Al Barlick (NL)
4	October 8	@ STL	Augie Donatelli (NL)	Ed Runge (AL)	Paul Pryor (NL)	Johnny Stevens (AL) (crew chief)	Al Barlick (NL)	Frank Umont (AL)
5	October 9	@ STL	Ed Runge (AL)	Paul Pryor (NL)	Johnny Stevens (AL) (crew chief)	Al Barlick (NL)	Frank Umont (AL)	Augie Donatelli (NL)
6	October 11	STL	Paul Pryor (NL)	Johnny Stevens (AL) (crew chief)	Al Barlick (NL)	Frank Umont (AL)	Augie Donatelli (NL)	Ed Runge (AL)
7	October 12	STL	Johnny Stevens (AL) (crew chief)	Al Barlick (NL)	Frank Umont (AL)	Augie Donatelli (NL)	Ed Runge (AL)	Paul Pryor (NL)

== Player stats ==
=== Batting ===
==== Fielders ====
Note: Pos=Position; GP=Games played; AB=At bats; R=Runs; H=Hits; 2B=Doubles; 3B=Triples; HR=Home runs; RBI=Runs batted in; BB=Walks; AVG=Batting average; OBP=On base percentage; SLG=Slugging percentage

Player	GP	AB	R	H	2B	3B	HR	RBI	BB	AVG	OBP	SLG	Reference
Mike Ryan	79	226	21	45	4	2	2	27	27	.199	.285	.261	
George Scott	159	565	74	171	21	7	19	82	63	.303	.373	.465	
Mike Andrews	142	494	79	130	20	0	8	40	62	.263	.346	.352	
Joe Foy	130	446	70	112	22	4	16	49	46	.251	.325	.426	
Rico Petrocelli	142	491	53	127	24	2	17	66	49	.259	.330	.420	
Carl Yastrzemski	161	579	112	189	31	4	44	121	91	.326	.418	.622	
Reggie Smith	158	565	78	139	24	6	15	61	58	.246	.316	.389	
Tony Conigliaro	95	349	59	100	11	5	20	67	27	.287	.341	.519	
Jerry Adair	89	316	41	92	13	1	3	26	13	.291	.321	.367	
José Tartabull	115	247	36	55	1	2	0	10	22	.223	.284	.243	
Dalton Jones	89	159	18	46	6	2	3	25	11	.289	.333	.409	
Russ Gibson	50	138	8	28	7	0	1	15	12	.203	.263	.275	
Elston Howard	42	116	9	17	3	0	1	11	9	.147	.211	.198	
George Thomas	65	89	10	19	2	0	1	6	3	.213	.255	.270	
Ken Harrelson	23	80	9	16	4	1	3	14	5	.200	.247	.388	
Bob Tillman	30	64	4	12	1	0	1	4	3	.188	.224	.250	
Norm Siebern	33	44	2	9	0	2	0	7	6	.205	.300	.295	
Don Demeter	20	42	7	12	5	0	1	4	3	.286	.333	.476	
Tony Horton	21	39	2	12	3	0	0	9	0	.308	.300	.385	
Jim Landis	5	7	1	1	0	0	1	1	1	.143	.250	.571	
Ken Poulsen	5	5	0	1	1	0	0	0	0	.200	.200	.400	

==== Pitchers ====
Note: GP=Games played; AB=At bats; R=Runs; H=Hits; 2B=Doubles; 3B=Triples; HR=Home runs; RBI=Runs batted in; BB=Walks; AVG=Batting average; OBP=On base percentage; SLG=Slugging percentage

Player	GP	AB	R	H	2B	3B	HR	RBI	BB	AVG	OBP	SLG	Reference
Jim Lonborg	39	99	7	14	1	1	0	8	3	.141	.167	.172	
Gary Bell	29	59	7	12	3	0	0	2	0	.203	.203	.254	
Lee Stange	35	50	2	3	1	0	0	1	2	.060	.094	.080	
Bucky Brandon	39	43	4	8	3	0	0	1	1	.186	.205	.256	
José Santiago	50	42	5	8	3	0	1	3	1	.190	.205	.333	
Dennis Bennett	13	25	1	3	0	0	1	4	0	.120	.115	.240	
Jerry Stephenson	8	16	0	4	0	0	0	0	0	.250	.250	.250	
John Wyatt	60	12	0	1	0	0	0	0	1	.083	.214	.083	
Dave Morehead	10	12	1	1	0	0	0	0	1	.083	.154	.083	
Gary Waslewski	12	11	0	1	0	0	0	0	0	.091	.091	.091	
Billy Rohr	10	10	0	0	0	0	0	0	2	.000	.167	.000	
Dan Osinski	34	9	0	3	1	0	0	1	0	.333	.333	.444	
Sparky Lyle	27	8	1	2	1	0	0	0	0	.250	.250	.375	
Hank Fischer	9	7	0	1	0	0	0	1	0	.143	.143	.143	
Galen Cisco	11	3	0	0	0	0	0	0	0	.000	.000	.000	
Bill Landis	21	2	1	0	0	0	0	0	0	.000	.000	.000	
Don McMahon	11	2	0	0	0	0	0	0	0	.000	.000	.000	
Ken Brett	1	0	0	0	0	0	0	0	0	─	─	─	

=== Pitching ===
Note: G=Games Played; GS=Games Started; IP=Innings Pitched; H=Hits; BB=Walks; R=Runs; ER=Earned Runs; SO=Strikeouts; W=Wins; L=Losses; SV=Saves; ERA=Earned Run Average

Player	G	GS	IP	H	BB	R	ER	SO	W	L	SV	ERA	Reference
Jim Lonborg	39	39	273 1/3	228	83	102	96	246	22	9	0	3.16	
Lee Strange	35	24	181 2/3	171	32	64	56	101	8	10	1	2.77	
Gary Bell	29	24	165 1/3	143	47	70	58	115	12	8	3	3.16	
Bucky Brandon	39	19	157 2/3	147	59	86	73	96	5	11	3	4.17	
José Santiago	50	11	145 1/3	138	46	61	58	109	12	4	5	3.59	
John Wyatt	60	0	93 1/3	71	39	30	27	68	10	7	20	2.60	
Dennis Bennett	13	11	69 2/3	72	22	32	30	34	4	3	0	3.88	
Dan Osinski	34	0	63 2/3	61	14	19	18	38	3	1	2	2.54	
Dave Morehead	10	9	47 2/3	48	22	24	23	40	5	4	0	4.34	
Billy Rohr	10	8	42 1/3	43	22	27	24	16	2	3	0	5.10	
Gary Waslewski	12	8	42	34	20	18	15	20	2	2	0	3.21	
Jerry Stephenson	8	6	39 2/3	32	16	18	17	24	3	1	1	3.86	
Hank Fischer	9	2	26 2/3	24	8	15	7	18	1	2	1	2.36	
Bill Landis	18	1	25 2/3	24	11	16	15	23	1	0	0	5.26	
Galen Cisco	11	0	22 1/3	21	8	10	9	8	0	1	1	3.63	
Don McMahon	11	0	17 2/3	14	13	8	8	10	1	2	2	4.08	
Ken Brett	1	0	2	3	0	1	1	2	0	0	0	4.50	

== 1967 World Series ==
NL St. Louis Cardinals (4) vs. AL Boston Red Sox (3)
Game	Score	Date	Location	Attendance	Time of Game
1	Cardinals: 2, Red Sox: 1	October 4	Fenway Park	34,796	2:22
2	Cardinals: 0, Red Sox: 5	October 5	Fenway Park	35,188	2:24
3	Red Sox: 2, Cardinals: 5	October 7	Busch Memorial Stadium	54,575	2:15
4	Red Sox: 0, Cardinals: 6	October 8	Busch Memorial Stadium	54,575	2:05
5	Red Sox: 3, Cardinals: 1	October 9	Busch Memorial Stadium	54,575	2:20
6	Cardinals: 4, Red Sox: 8	October 11	Fenway Park	35,188	2:48
7	Cardinals: 7, Red Sox: 2	October 12	Fenway Park	35,188	2:23

== Awards and honors ==
=== Individual awards and leaders ===
- American League Most Valuable Player: Carl Yastrzemski.
- American League Cy Young Award: Jim Lonborg.
- American League Gold Glove Awards: George Scott (first base), Carl Yastrzemski (outfield).
- American League Batting Champion: Carl Yastrzemski (.326).
- American League Hits Leader: Carl Yastrzemski (189).
- American League Home Run Champion: Carl Yastrzemski (44).
- American League RBI Leader: Carl Yastrzemski (121).
- American League Runs Leader: Carl Yastrzemski (112).
- American League Total Bases Leader: Carl Yastrzemski (360).
- American League On Base Percentage Leader: Carl Yastrzemski (.418).
- American League Slugging Percentage Leader: Carl Yastrzemski (.622).
- American League Strikeouts Leader: Jim Lonborg (246).
- American League Wins Leader: Jim Lonborg (22).
- American League All-Stars: Carl Yastrzemski, Rico Petrocelli, Tony Conigliaro, Jim Lonborg.
- Associated Press Athlete of the Year: Carl Yastrzemski.
- Associated Press AL Manager of the Year: Dick Williams.
- Hutch Award: Carl Yastrzemski.

=== Team statistics ===
- Batting average: 1st (.255)
- Runs/game: 1st (4.46)
- Hits: 1st (1394)
- Home runs: 1st (158)

=== Commemoration ===
The 2007 season marked the 40th anniversary of The Impossible Dream, which was honored and marked with Opening Day ceremonies featuring members of the 1967 Red Sox team and an hour-long documentary on NESN (a regional sports network part-owned by the Red Sox) called Impossible to Forget. The Red Sox went on to win the 2007 World Series, a four-game sweep over the Colorado Rockies as well, to earn their second title in four years.

In October 2023, nine members of the team met at TD Garden in Boston to commemorate the season. Of the 39 players who appeared in a game for the 1967 Red Sox, 20 were known to still be living. Attending the reunion were: Gary Bell, Darrell "Bucky" Brandon, Jim Lonborg, Dave Morehead, Rico Petrocelli, Billy Rohr, José Santiago, George Thomas, and Carl Yastrzemski.

== Farm system ==
Level	Team	League	Manager
AAA	Toronto Maple Leafs	International League	Eddie Kasko
AA	Pittsfield Red Sox	Eastern League	Billy Gardner
A	Winston-Salem Red Sox	Carolina League	Bill Slack
A	Waterloo Hawks	Midwest League	Rac Slider
A	Greenville Red Sox	Western Carolinas League	Matt Sczesny
