= Kinnamon =

Kinnamon is a surname. Notable people with the surname include:

- Bill Kinnamon (1919–2011), American umpire in Major League Baseball
- Don Kinnamon (1937–2025), American politician in Oklahoma

== See also ==
- Gerry Cinnamon (born 1984), Scottish singer-songwriter and acoustic guitarist
- John Kinnamos (1140s–after 1185), Byzantine historian
