= Ken Poulsen =

American baseball player (1947–2017)

- Third baseman/Shortstop
- Born: August 4, 1947; Van Nuys, California, U.S.
- Died: December 28, 2017 (aged 70); Fresno, California, U.S.
- Batted: Left Threw: Right

MLB debut
- July 3, 1967, for the Boston Red Sox

Last MLB appearance
- July 14, 1967, for the Boston Red Sox

MLB statistics
- Games played: 5
- At bats: 5
- Hits: 1
- Stats at Baseball Reference

Teams
- Boston Red Sox (1967)

Ken Sterling Poulsen (August 4, 1947 – December 28, 2017) was a professional baseball utility player who played for the Boston Red Sox of Major League Baseball (MLB) during the 1967 season. Listed at 6 feet 1 inch (1.85 m) and 190 pounds (86 kg), he batted left-handed and threw right-handed.

== Biography ==
Poulsen played three years of varsity baseball at Birmingham High School in Los Angeles, where he helped his team win the championship of the West Valley League in 1963, 1964, and 1965, being named a first-team all-star in the league and third-team all-star on the All-City team. He was selected by the Boston Red Sox in the third round of the 1965 MLB draft, and played in the minor leagues in 1966 for the Winston-Salem Red Sox in the Class A Carolina League, batting .238 in 110 games with 11 home runs and 49 RBIs.

In 1967, Poulsen played 73 games with Winston-Salem, and 19 games for the Double-A Pittsfield Red Sox. He gained a promotion to Boston as a replacement for infielder Dalton Jones.

Poulsen made his major league debut on July 3, 1967, and appeared in five games with the Red Sox. He had one hit (a double) in five at-bats for a .200 average. He also made three fielding appearances; twice at third base and once at shortstop, recording a .667 fielding percentage (one error in three chances). He played his final MLB game on July 14, 1967. The Red Sox would go on to win the American League title, in a season known as "The Impossible Dream".

Following his brief stint in the majors, Poulsen returned to the minor leagues. From 1968 through 1973, he played in the farm system of the New York Yankees, where he experienced some success as a pitcher, posting two seasons with a winning record; 1971 with the Class A Kinston Indians (10–8) and 1972 with the Double-A West Haven Yankees (9–8). Overall as a minor league pitcher, Poulsen had a 33–34 record in 109 games (56 starts) with a 3.02 ERA. As a minor league hitter, he had a .233 average with 37 home runs and 153 RBIs, recorded in 497 games played during eight seasons.

Poulsen died in Fresno, California, on December 28, 2017. In July 2019, the Red Sox recognized Poulsen's contribution, albeit only during five games, to their 1967 pennant-winning season by presenting his family with a commemorative ring in a ceremony at Fenway Park.
