= Russ Gibson =

American baseball player (1939–2008)

- Catcher
- Born: May 6, 1939; Fall River, Massachusetts, U.S.
- Died: July 27, 2008 (aged 69); Swansea, Massachusetts, U.S.
- Batted: Right Threw: Right

MLB debut
- April 14, 1967, for the Boston Red Sox

Last MLB appearance
- September 6, 1972, for the San Francisco Giants

MLB statistics
- Batting average: .228
- Home runs: 8
- Run batted in: 78
- Stats at Baseball Reference

Teams
- Boston Red Sox (1967–1969); San Francisco Giants (1970–1972)

John Russell Gibson (May 6, 1939 – July 27, 2008) was an American professional baseball catcher who played for the Boston Red Sox and San Francisco Giants of Major League Baseball (MLB) between 1967 and 1972. Listed at 6 feet 1 inch (1.85 m) and 195 pounds (88 kg), he batted and threw right-handed.

== Early years ==
Gibson was born and raised in Fall River, Massachusetts, and was a graduate of B.M.C. Durfee High School, where he was a three-sport star, including playing forward for the 1956 New England championship basketball team.

Gibson played briefly for the Falmouth All-Stars of the Cape Cod Baseball League in 1957, just prior to being signed by the Red Sox. In his only game with Falmouth, he hit two home runs.

== Career ==
In June 1957, Red Sox scout Joe Dugan signed Gibson to a contract with the Oklahoma City Indians of the Texas League, although Gibson never played for them. Gibson played for ten years in Minor League Baseball, spending seasons in the Class D Midwest League and New York–Penn League (1957–1958), Class B Carolina League (1959–1961), Class A Eastern League (1962), Triple-A Pacific Coast League (1963–1964), and Triple-A International League (1965–1966). After the 1966 season, when he hit .292 with Triple-A Toronto, Gibson was added to Boston's major league roster.

=== Boston Red Sox ===
1967

As a 27-year-old rookie, Gibson made his major league debut with the Red Sox at Yankee Stadium on April 14, 1967, catching fellow rookie Billy Rohr, starting pitcher against Whitey Ford and the New York Yankees. Rohr was one strike away from a no-hitter when Yankees' catcher Elston Howard looped a two-out, ninth inning single to right-center field. Coincidentally, Howard would be traded to Boston later that season, sharing catching duties with Gibson through the next season. Gibson also contributed offensively to Rohr's 3–0 one-hit victory, going 2-for-4 and scoring a run.

In early May, Gibson was optioned to the Pittsfield Red Sox of the Eastern League (then at the Double-A level); he was recalled to Boston later in the month. On June 12, Gibson hit a two-run home run at Fenway Park off of Joe Verbanic to help defeat the Yankees, 3–1; it was his first major league homer. During the regular season, Gibson appeared in 49 major league games, batting .203 with one home run and 15 RBIs.

A member of the pennant-winning 1967 Red Sox "Impossible Dream" team, Gibson caught the first game of that year's World Series against the St. Louis Cardinals; he was 0-for-2 before being lifted for a pinch hitter in the seventh inning. His only other appearance in the series was defensively in the ninth inning of Game 7, which the Cardinals won, 7–2.

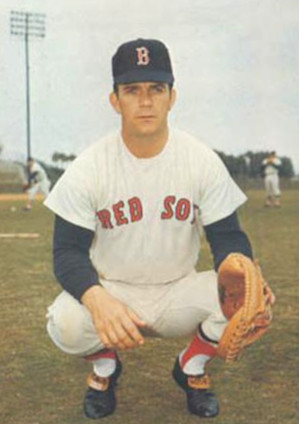
Gibson in 1969

1968

On June 23, 1968, Gibson went 4-for-4 against the Chicago White Sox at Comiskey Park. All four hits came against two of baseball's greatest knuckleball pitchers, Wilbur Wood and Hoyt Wilhelm. On August 3, Gibson played two innings at first base, the only defensive appearance of his MLB career at a position other than catcher. For the season, Gibson batted .225 with three home runs and 20 RBIs in 76 games played.

1969

Gibson enjoyed his best season in 1969, when he posted career highs in games played (85), batting average (.251), hits (72), runs (21), home runs (3) and RBIs (27), as he platooned with Jerry Moses and Tom Satriano.

During spring training prior to the 1970 season, Gibson's contract was sold to the San Francisco Giants. In his three seasons with the Red Sox, Gibson batted .232 with seven home runs and 62 RBIs in 210 MLB games played.

=== San Francisco Giants ===
Gibson spent all of 1970 and 1971 with San Francisco in a backup role, along with five games in 1972 when he also played for the Triple-A Phoenix Giants. In his three seasons with San Francisco, Gibson batted .210 with one home run and 16 RBIs in 54 MLB games played. Prior to the start of the 1973 season, Gibson retired.

Overall, in a six-season MLB career, Gibson was a .228 hitter (181-for-794) with eight home runs and 78 RBI in 264 games played, including 49 runs, 34 doubles, four triples, and two stolen bases.

== Later years ==
Gibson had resided in Swansea, Massachusetts, since 1982, and died there at age 69 after a long illness, on the same day that his 1967 Red Sox manager, Dick Williams, was inducted into the Baseball Hall of Fame.
