= Joe Stephenson =

American baseball player (1921–2001)

- Catcher
- Born: June 30, 1921; Detroit, Michigan, U.S.
- Died: September 20, 2001 (aged 80); Fullerton, California, U.S.
- Batted: Right Threw: Right

MLB debut
- September 19, 1943, for the New York Giants

Last MLB appearance
- July 11, 1947, for the Chicago White Sox

MLB statistics
- Batting average: .179
- Home runs: 0
- Runs batted in: 4
- Stats at Baseball Reference

Teams
- New York Giants (1943); Chicago Cubs (1944); Chicago White Sox (1947)

Joseph Chester Stephenson (June 30, 1921 – September 20, 2001) was an American catcher in Major League Baseball who played for the New York Giants (1943), Chicago Cubs (1944) and Chicago White Sox (1947). Following his retirement as a player, Stephenson gained most of his fame as a scout for the Boston Red Sox based in Orange County, California, signing future All-Stars Rick Burleson, Dwight Evans, Bill Lee and Fred Lynn during his tenure of nearly 50 years as a scout in the Boston organization.

Stephenson batted and threw right-handed, and was listed as 6 feet 2 inches (1.88 m) tall and 185 pounds (84 kg). A native of Detroit, Michigan, and an alumnus of Michigan State University and Western Michigan University, Stephenson's minor league career extended from 1941 through 1951. He caught in part of three big-league seasons in the 1940s. He posted a .179 batting average (12-for-67) with eight runs and four RBI in 29 games played.

He was the father of Jerry Stephenson (1944–2010), like Joe a former MLB player (as a pitcher) who became a longtime scout.

== See also ==
- List of second-generation Major League Baseball players
