= Bill Landis =

American baseball player (born 1942)

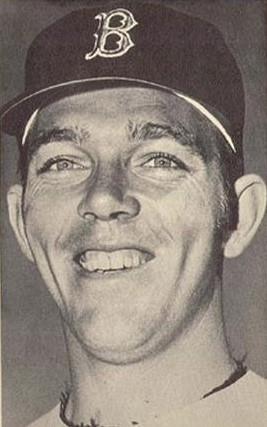
- Pitcher
- Born: October 8, 1942 (age 84); Hanford, California, U.S.
- Batted: Left Threw: Left

MLB debut
- September 28, 1963, for the Kansas City Athletics

Last MLB appearance
- September 30, 1969, for the Boston Red Sox

MLB statistics
- Win–loss record: 9–8
- Earned run average: 4.46
- Strikeouts: 135
- Stats at Baseball Reference

Teams
- Kansas City Athletics (1963); Boston Red Sox (1967–1969)

William Henry Landis (born October 8, 1942) is an American former professional baseball pitcher. A left-hander, he appeared in 102 games pitched in Major League Baseball (MLB) in 1963 and from 1967–1969 for the Kansas City Athletics and Boston Red Sox. Landis was born in Hanford, California; he was listed as 6 feet 2 inches (1.88 m) tall and 178 pounds (81 kg).

Landis signed with the Athletics in 1961 and appeared in one game for them two years later, a late-season relief assignment against the Cleveland Indians. In the minor leagues, he was known for his wildness, issuing over 100 bases on balls during three of his first four seasons as a professional. The Red Sox selected him in the 1966 Rule 5 Draft and he pitched for them for the next three full MLB seasons. During his rookie campaign, the 1967 "Impossible Dream" Red Sox unexpectedly won the American League pennant. Still struggling with his control, Landis worked in only 18 games that year and missed the 1967 World Series due to U.S. Army Reserve commitments.

In 1968, Landis enjoyed his finest season in the majors. Working in 38 games, 37 in relief, he compiled a strong 3.15 earned run average and a career-high three saves. He also struck out twice as many hitters (59) as he walked (30). In 1969, Landis was used more frequently, setting career bests in appearances (45) and innings pitched (821/3), but he was plagued by a sore arm and his effectiveness diminished. Boston shipped him to Triple-A Louisville in 1970, and Landis left baseball after a brief Triple-A trial in 1971 with the St. Louis Cardinals.

For his MLB career, Landis posted a 9–8 record with a 4.46 ERA in 102 appearances. In six starts, he failed to register a complete game. He was credited with four saves. In 1692/3 innings pitched, he allowed 154 hits and 91 bases on balls, with 135 strikeouts.
