= Al Salerno =

American baseball umpire (1931-2007)

- Born: Alexander Joseph Salerno; March 19, 1931; Utica, New York, U.S.
- Died: August 5, 2007 (aged 76); Utica, New York, U.S.
- Occupation: Umpire
- Years active: 1961–1968
- Employer: American League
- Spouse: Joan Marie Nole
- Children: Nicholas

Alexander Joseph Salerno (March 19, 1931 – August 5, 2007) was an American professional baseball umpire who worked in the American League from 1961 to 1968. Salerno worked as the right field umpire in the 1964 Major League Baseball All-Star Game. In his career, he umpired 1,110 Major League games.

== Early career ==
Before his baseball umpiring career began, Salerno was a pitcher in the Boston Red Sox organization. He was drafted out of high school, being able to throw a 95 mph fastball. He only had one loss in his high school career, which resulted when he threw a no-hitter. He played for the Marion Red Sox of the Ohio–Indiana League in 1950.

He was drafted into the United States Army and by the Boston Red Sox a couple of days apart. Unfortunately, he broke both his arms after falling out of a jeep during his time in the service and was unable to ever pitch again. After this relatively short-lived playing career, Salerno became a New York state police officer, and spent time as both a trooper and a motor vehicle licensing examiner. He also umpired local baseball and softball games, and eventually enrolled in the Al Somers Umpire School in Daytona Beach, Florida.

== Major league career ==
After spending time in various levels of the minor leagues, Salerno joined the American League staff in September 1961 at the age of 30.

Salerno was the third base umpire when Roger Maris hit his record-breaking 61st home run in Yankee Stadium.

On September 16, 1968, Salerno received a call from American League president Joe Cronin, informing Salerno both he and crewmate Bill Valentine were being fired, effective immediately. Cronin told Salerno and the press he was fired for being a poor umpire. However, Salerno and Valentine had in fact been working to form a union of American League umpires, with the hopes they could join their National League counterparts to form one union of Major League umpires.

Bill Kunkel, a former Major League pitcher, and Jake O'Donnell, who was already a referee in the NBA, were called up to replace Salerno and Valentine.

After the 1968 season, Salerno and Valentine filed a $4 million lawsuit against the American League and Major League Baseball, alleging defamation of character and federal antitrust violations. In 1970, as a settlement, the American League offered the umpires full reinstatement, back pay, and $20,000 in salary, but Salerno refused the deal because of a provision which stated the umpires would have to spend time in the minor leagues to improve their skills. Salerno and Valentine lost both cases, and Salerno returned to Utica.

== Later life ==
Although disappointed he would never umpire again, Salerno was also bitter, stating, "If every baseball stadium in the country blew up tomorrow, I’d be happy." Salerno continued to fight the case for the rest of his life, writing letters to lawyers the commissioner's office, and even Chief Justice John Roberts. Due to health problems, he never held a steady job after his firing. He died in Utica on August 5, 2007.

== See also ==
- List of Major League Baseball umpires (disambiguation)
