= Bucky Brandon =

American baseball player (born 1940)

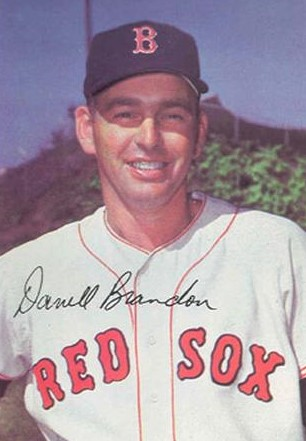
- Pitcher
- Born: July 8, 1940 (age 86); Nacogdoches, Texas, U.S.
- Batted: Right Threw: Right

MLB debut
- April 19, 1966, for the Boston Red Sox

Last MLB appearance
- September 30, 1973, for the Philadelphia Phillies

MLB statistics
- Win–loss record: 28–37
- Earned run average: 4.04
- Strikeouts: 354
- Stats at Baseball Reference

Teams
- Boston Red Sox (1966–1968); Seattle Pilots (1969); Minnesota Twins (1969); Philadelphia Phillies (1971–1973)

Darrell G "Bucky" Brandon (born July 8, 1940), is an American former professional baseball right-handed pitcher, who played in Major League Baseball (MLB) for the Boston Red Sox, Seattle Pilots, Minnesota Twins and Philadelphia Phillies. During a seven-year MLB career, Brandon compiled 28 wins, 354 strikeouts, and a 4.04 earned run average (ERA).

Brandon attended Nacogdoches High School in Texas and was signed as a free agent in 1959 by the Pittsburgh Pirates.

Once a heralded pitching prospect, Brandon was an undistinguished reliever throughout most of his career. In 1966, his rookie season, he made 40 appearances (17 starts) for Boston and finished 8–8 with a 3.31 ERA, a career-high 101 strikeouts, five complete games and two shutouts. On July 20, 1966, Brandon tossed a complete game, allowing one earned run on just two hits in a win over the California Angels. However, Brandon developed arm problems at this early stage of his career and slumped to a 5–11 record in 1967, then pitched only 12 2/3 innings in 1968. A year later, he divided his playing time between the expansion Seattle Pilots and Minnesota, and then spent the entire 1970 season with the Triple-A Tucson Toros, in the Chicago White Sox farm system. From 1971 to 1973, Brandon collected 15 wins and eight saves for the Phillies, as a reliever and spot starter.
