= Bill Valentine =

American baseball umpire and executive (1932-2015)

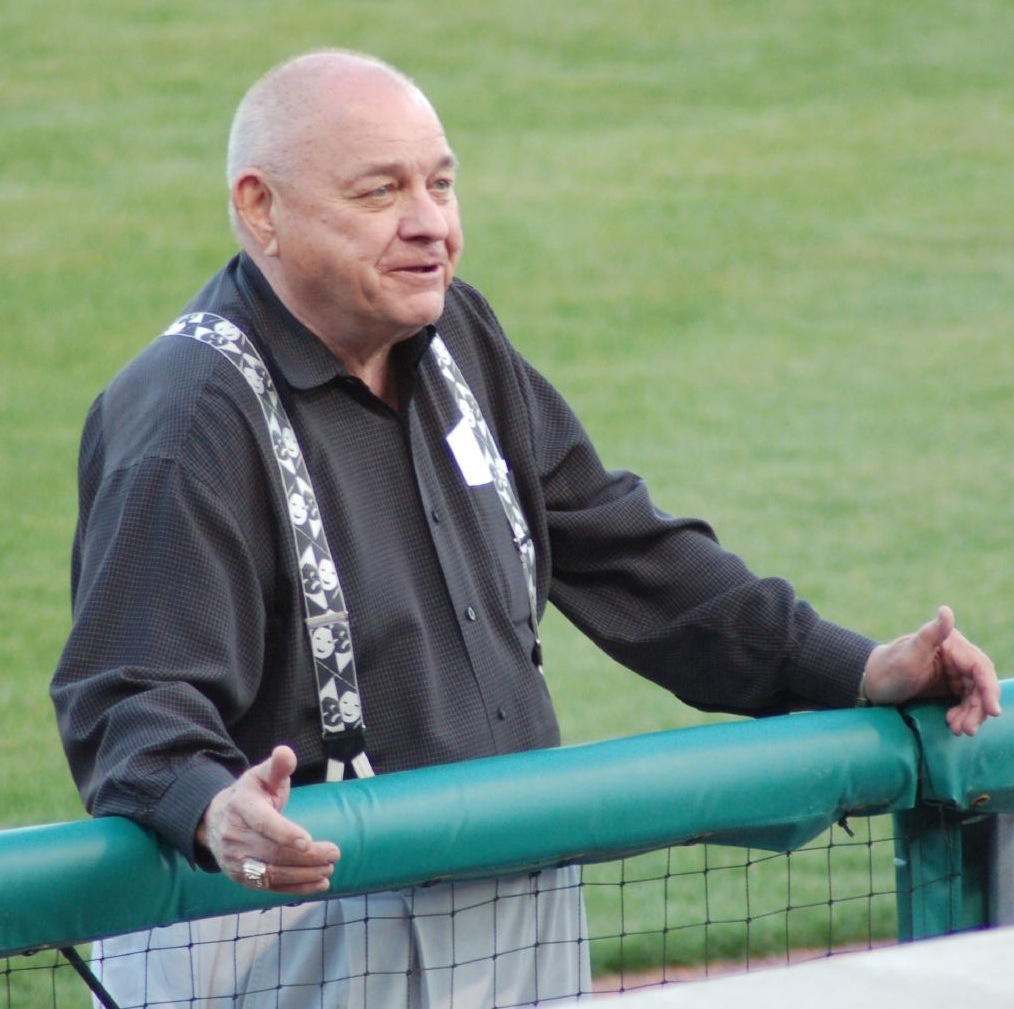
- Valentine in 2007
- Born: William Terry Valentine, Jr. November 21, 1932; Little Rock, Arkansas, U.S.
- Died: April 26, 2015 (aged 82); Little Rock, Arkansas, U.S.
- Occupation: Umpire
- Years active: 1963–1968
- Employer: American League
- Height: 5' 11''
- Spouse(s): Mary Ellouise Pefferly (1951–1989; her death); Nena Duncan (1991–2015; his death)

William Terry Valentine, Jr. (November 21, 1932 – April 26, 2015) was an American professional baseball umpire who worked in the American League from 1963 to 1968. Valentine was an umpire in the 1965 Major League Baseball All-Star Game. In his career, he umpired 947 Major League games.

== Early life ==
Valentine was born in Little Rock, Arkansas, to William Valentine Sr., a railroad worker, and Margaret Kremer Valentine. Valentine grew up a short distance from Travelers Field, the home stadium of the Arkansas Travelers minor league team. Valentine worked odd jobs at the stadium, including sorting soft drink bottles before games, retrieving seat cushions after games, and shagging foul balls and returning them during games.

Valentine began umpiring in amateur and semi-pro games as a teenager. Valentine graduated from North Little Rock High School in 1950, and received a scholarship from the Arkansas State Teachers College to study journalism. However, Valentine continued to umpire, and in 1951 he attended the Bill McGowan umpiring school in West Palm Beach, Florida. He received an offer to umpire in the Class D Ohio–Indiana League, and became the youngest professional umpire in baseball history, at the age of 18.

== Career ==
Valentine spent several years in the lower minors, but was promoted to the Double-A Texas League in 1954. After seven seasons in the Texas League, Valentine was promoted to the Pacific Coast League in 1960, and was hired to the American League staff two seasons later in 1963.

Valentine spent six years as an AL umpire, and was chosen as an umpire for the 1965 All-Star Game at Metropolitan Stadium. A few days after the All-Star game, in the same ballpark, Valentine got into an argument with Minnesota Twins manager Sam Mele, in which Mele appeared to throw a punch at Valentine. Mele was suspended five games for his actions. Valentine was also the home plate umpire when Tony Conigliaro was hit by a pitched ball at Fenway Park on August 18, 1967.

== Firing ==
On September 16, 1968, Valentine received a call from American League president Joe Cronin, informing both Valentine and fellow umpire Al Salerno were being fired, effective immediately. Cronin told Valentine and the press he was fired for being a poor umpire. However, Valentine and Salerno had in fact been working to form a union of American League umpires, who were receiving a lower salary than the National League umpires, who were unionized.

After the 1968 season, Valentine and Salerno filed a $4 million lawsuit against the American League and Major League Baseball, alleging federal antitrust violations and defamation of character. In addition, the newly formed Major League Umpires Association filed an unfair-labor-practice claim with the National Labor Relations Board. However, Valentine and Salerno lost both cases. In 1970, as a settlement, the American League offered the umpires full reinstatement, back pay, and $20,000 in salary, however Salerno refused the deal because of a provision which stated the umpires would have to spend time in the minor leagues to improve their skills.

== After umpiring ==
Salerno's refusal of the settlement ended his and Valentine's careers, and Valentine returned to Little Rock. He worked as a referee for basketball games. He was for a time the executive director of the Arkansas Republican Party, a position originally held from 1970 to 1973 by Neal Sox Johnson. Valentine worked as an announcer for the Arkansas Travelers for eight years. In 1976, Valentine became general manager of the Travelers. In his first season as general manager, the team saw a 34 percent increase in attendance, due in part to Valentine's stunts including giving away tens of thousands of tickets to kids, hoping they would bring their parents to the game with them, and holding midget wrestling and amateur boxing at the stadium. The Travelers' attendance continued to increase over the years, and also saw on-field success, winning five league titles while Valentine was GM. Valentine was inducted into the Arkansas Sports Hall of Fame, the Arkansas Officials Association Hall of Fame, the Texas League Hall of Fame, and the North Little Rock Boys Club Hall of Fame.

Even though Valentine stepped down as general manager in 2007, after thirty-one years, he remained executive vice president for two more seasons before totally retiring in March 2009.

He died on April 26, 2015, in Little Rock, Arkansas.

== See also ==
- List of Major League Baseball umpires (disambiguation)
