= Cal Drummond =

American baseball umpire (1917–1970)

- Born: Calvin Troy Drummond; June 29, 1917; Ninety Six, South Carolina, U.S.
- Died: May 3, 1970 (aged 52); Des Moines, Iowa, U.S.
- Occupation: Umpire
- Years active: 1960–1969
- Employer: American League

Calvin Troy Drummond (June 29, 1917 – May 3, 1970) was an American professional baseball umpire who worked in the American League (AL) from 1960 to 1969.

== Biography ==
Drummond was born in 1917 in Ninety Six, South Carolina. He attended the Al Somers Umpire School. Drummond umpired 1,357 Major League Baseball (MLB) games in his ten-year career. He umpired in the 1966 World Series and the 1961 Major League Baseball All-Star Game.

During a 1969 game, Drummond was struck in the head with a foul ball. He underwent surgery to remove a blood clot from his brain. After the procedure, Drummond was unconscious for around two weeks. Merle Anthony was hired by AL president Joe Cronin as his replacement. He recovered, but he was unable to obtain medical clearance in time for the beginning of the 1970 MLB season.

On May 1, 1970, Drummond returned to umpiring in the Class AAA American Association, working a game in Des Moines. He was later said to have experienced dizziness and numbness on the side of his head during that game. The following night, Drummond returned to the field but stopped the game in the seventh inning and went to the dugout complaining of dizziness. He collapsed in the dugout and an ambulance took him to a Des Moines hospital, where he died early in the morning of May 3. His death was later determined to have resulted from a cerebral infarction, a stroke caused by decreased blood flow to an area of the brain.

Drummond and his wife Elizabeth had been married since 1938.

== See also ==
- List of Major League Baseball umpires (disambiguation)
