= John Stevens (baseball umpire) =

American baseball umpire (1912-1981)

John William Stevens (May 14, 1912 – September 9, 1981) was an American umpire in Major League Baseball who worked in the American League from 1948 to 1971. He umpired in four World Series and five All-Star Games. Stevens also refereed college basketball.

== Biography ==
Born in Duquesne, Pennsylvania, he officiated in the World Series in 1951 (outfield only), 1954, 1960 and 1967, serving as crew chief in 1967, and in the All-Star Game in 1950, 1953, 1957, 1960 (both games) and 1965, working behind the plate in 1965 and for the second half of the 1957 game; he also worked behind the plate for Game 1 of the 1970 American League Championship Series during a labor strike, after having begun working primarily as an assistant league supervisor and substitute umpire in 1968.

Stevens was behind the plate on August 20, 1957 when Bob Keegan of the Chicago White Sox pitched a 6–0 no-hitter against the Washington Senators, missing a perfect game only due to walks in the fifth and sixth innings. Stevens was again behind the plate on April 30, 1967 when Steve Barber and Stu Miller of the Baltimore Orioles combined on a no-hitter against the Detroit Tigers, only to lose 2–1 after issuing ten walks and hitting two batsmen. Detroit won with two runs in the ninth inning, tying the game on a Barber wild pitch after he had issued two walks, and then bringing in the lead run on an infield error by normally sure-handed second baseman Mark Belanger, who dropped a perfect throw from shortstop Luis Aparicio. It was the first time in Major League Baseball history multiple pitchers combined on a nine-inning no-hitter only to lose.

Stevens was also working the plate on September 10, 1967, when Joel Horlen threw his no-hitter for the Chicago White Sox against the visiting Detroit Tigers at Comiskey Park before a crowd of 23,625.

Stevens also worked as a basketball referee, officiating in the NIT and NCAA tournaments. He was the godfather of National Basketball Association referee Steve Javie. Stevens died at age 69 in Philadelphia.

== See also ==
- List of Major League Baseball umpires (disambiguation)
