= Dave Baldwin (baseball) =

American baseball player (born 1938)

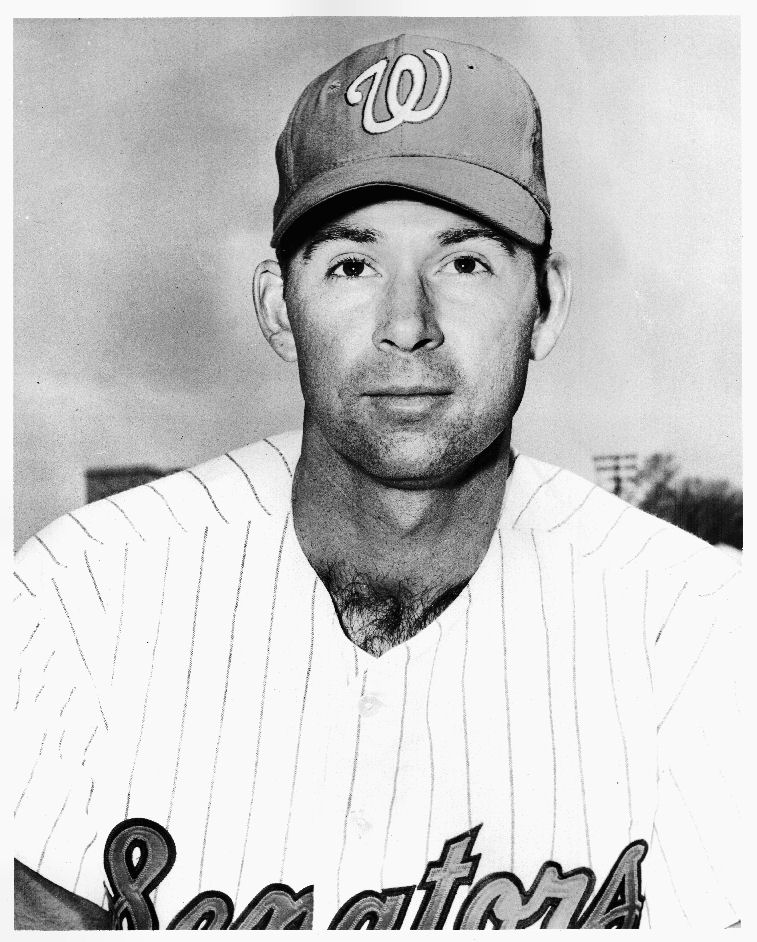
- Baldwin in 1968
- Pitcher
- Born: March 30, 1938 (age 88); Tucson, Arizona, U.S.
- Batted: Right Threw: Right

MLB debut
- September 6, 1966, for the Washington Senators

Last MLB appearance
- August 7, 1973, for the Chicago White Sox

MLB statistics
- Win–loss record: 6–11
- Earned run average: 3.08
- Strikeouts: 164
- Saves: 23
- Stats at Baseball Reference

Teams
- Washington Senators (1966–1969); Milwaukee Brewers (1970); Chicago White Sox (1973)

David George Baldwin (born March 30, 1938) is an American former professional baseball pitcher.

== Life and career ==
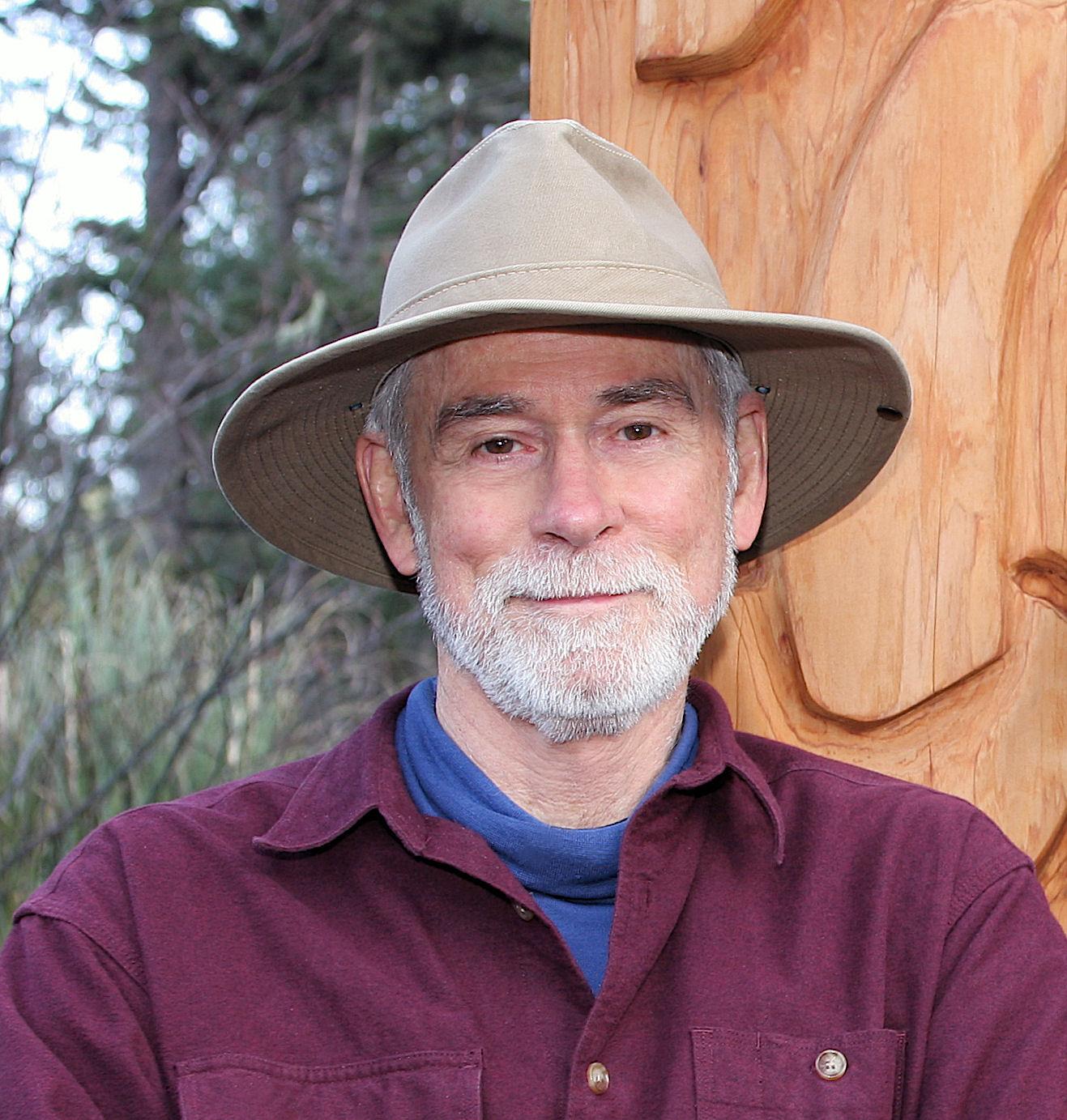
Dave Baldwin in 2007

Born in Tucson, Arizona, on March 30, 1938, Baldwin pitched for three years for the University of Arizona. In the 1959 College World Series, he beat Fresno State 5 to 1 on a two-hitter and lost the final game of the series 5 to 3 to Oklahoma State. He signed with the Philadelphia Phillies in 1959 and pitched on three pennant winners in his first four years of pro ball.

Later, he was a relief specialist for the Washington Senators (1966–69), Milwaukee Brewers (1970), and Chicago White Sox (1973). In 176 games he compiled a record of 6 wins and 11 losses, with 23 saves and an ERA of 3.08. The combined batting average of opponents against him was .234 In 1967, he ranked 3rd in the American League and 5th in the major leagues (of pitchers with 10 or more appearances) with an ERA of 1.70. That season he ranked 5th in the American League for relief runs saved (11.8), ranked 7th in saves (12), and ranked 9th in pitching appearances (58). In 1970, Baldwin led major league pitchers in range factor per nine innings (a measure of fielding proficiency) with a value of 5.094, the seventh highest value ever compiled.

In 1974, Baldwin, at age 36, was the second oldest player in both the Pacific Coast League and the American Association. Baldwin did not commit an error during his six-year major league career, handling 64 total chances (15 putouts, 49 assists) and committed only three errors throughout the 16 years he played professional baseball.

After he retired from baseball in 1974 he earned a Ph.D. in genetics and an M.S. in systems engineering from the University of Arizona. He worked as a geneticist, engineer, and artist until his retirement in 2003. Subsequently, he has collaborated with other researchers studying the physics, physiology, and psychology of baseball. In addition, he has published his baseball memoir, Snake Jazz, and (under the pen name "DGB Featherkile") a collection of his poetry, Limbic Hurly-Burly. Many of his poems have appeared in such journals as American Poetry Journal, Blue Unicorn, and Evansville Review. His poetry won the Atlanta Review's 2007 International Publication Prize and the 2009 Fluvanna Prize from The Lyric.

Baldwin's painting "Fugue for the Pepper Players" is in the collection of the Baseball Hall of Fame in Cooperstown, New York, and was featured in Treasures of the Baseball Hall of Fame by John Thorn (1998) pp. 188–189.

Baldwin has been inducted into the University of Arizona Sports Hall of Fame (class of 2015) and the Pima County, Arizona, Sports Hall of Fame (class of 2011). He received the Professional Achievement Award from the University of Arizona Alumni Association in 2009.

== Selected publications ==
- Bahill, A. T. & Baldwin, D. G. (2007) "Describing baseball pitch movement with right-hand rules", Computers in Biology and Medicine, 37:1001–1008.
- Bahill, A.T. & Baldwin, D. G. (2004) "The rising fastball and other perceptual illusions of batters." In Biomedical Engineering Principles in Sports. G. K. Hung and J. M. Pallis, eds. NY: Kluwer Academic / Plenum. pp. 257–287.
- Bahill, A. T., Baldwin, D. G., & Venkateswaran, J. (2005) "Predicting a baseball's path", American Scientist, 93(3): 218–225.
- Baldwin, D. (2008) Snake Jazz. Philadelphia: Xlibris (self-published).
- Baldwin, D. G. (2001) "How to win the blame game", Harvard Business Review, 79(7): 55–62.
- Baldwin, D. G. and Bahill, A.T. (2004) "A model of the bat's vertical sweetness gradient." In The Engineering of Sport (5). M. Hubbard, R.D. Mehta, and J. M. Pallis, eds. Proceedings of the 5th International Engineering of Sport Conference, September 13–16, 2004, Davis, California, International Sports Engineering Association (ISEA), Sheffield, UK, 2:305–311.
- Baldwin, D. G., Bahill, A.T., and Nathan, A. (2007) "Nickel and dime pitches", Baseball Research Journal, 35: 25–29.
- Featherkile, DGB. (2009) Limbic Hurly-Burly: Poems of Humor and Paradox. Yachats, Oregon: Stillman & Hyla.
- Mangan, R. L. and Baldwin, D. (1986) "A new cryptic species of Odontoloxozus (Neriidae: Diptera) from the cape region of Baja California Sur (Mexico)." Proceedings of the Entomological Society of Washington (D.C.), 88: 110–121.
- McBeath, M. K., Nathan, A. M., Bahill, A. T., and Baldwin, D.G. (2008) "Paradoxical pop-ups: Why are they difficult to catch?" American Journal of Physics, 76(8): 723–729.

== Selected solo art exhibits ==
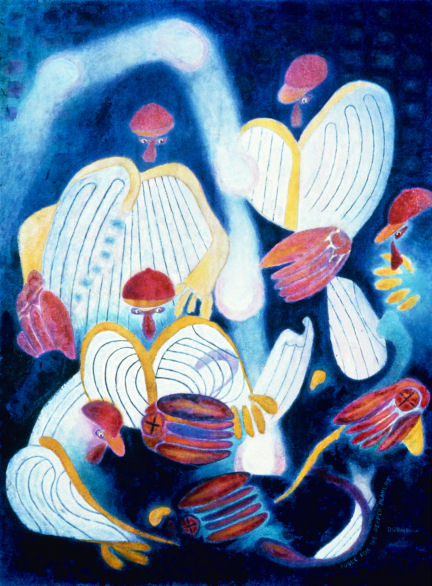
Dave Baldwin's painting "Fugue for the Pepper Players"

- Thousand Oaks Civic Arts Plaza, Thousand Oaks, California (April–May 1997).
- Grants Pass Museum of Art, Grants Pass, Oregon (June–July 1997).
- R. Howard Dobbs University Center, Emory University, Atlanta (November 1997).
- Sarratt Gallery, Vanderbilt University, Nashville, Tennessee (January–February 1998).
- Randall L. Jones Theatre, Utah Shakespearean Festival, Southern Utah University, Cedar City, Utah (June–August 1998).
