= Gary Waslewski =

American baseball player (born 1941)

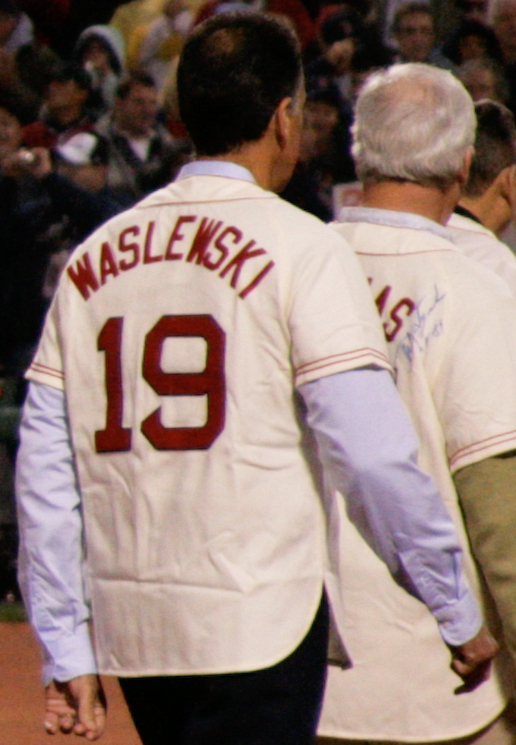
- Waslewski at the 2007 World Series
- Pitcher
- Born: July 21, 1941 (age 85); Meriden, Connecticut, U.S.
- Batted: Right Threw: Right

MLB debut
- June 11, 1967, for the Boston Red Sox

Last MLB appearance
- September 28, 1972, for the Oakland Athletics

MLB statistics
- Win–loss record: 11–26
- Earned run average: 3.44
- Strikeouts: 229
- Stats at Baseball Reference

Teams
- Boston Red Sox (1967–1968); St. Louis Cardinals (1969); Montreal Expos (1969–1970); New York Yankees (1970–1971); Oakland Athletics (1972)

Gary Lee Waslewski (born July 21, 1941) is an American former professional baseball player who played as a pitcher from 1967 to 1972. He accrued an 11–26 win–loss record, plus 5 saves in his career, with an ERA of 3.44.

== Career ==
Waslewski made his major league debut in 1967 with the Boston Red Sox. In 1968, he was one of 10 pitchers who led the American League (AL) with a perfect 1.000 fielding percentage. He started Game 6 of the 1967 World Series for the Red Sox. On December 3, 1968, he was traded by the Red Sox to the St. Louis Cardinals for Ducky Schofield. On June 3 the following season, he was traded by the Cardinals to the Montreal Expos for Mudcat Grant. On May 15, 1970, he was traded by the Expos to the New York Yankees for Dave McDonald. Released by the Yankees on April 3, 1972, he signed as a free agent on May 15, 1972, with the Oakland Athletics.

Waslewski also played winter baseball with the Navegantes del Magallanes club of the Venezuelan League in the 1965-66 season. There he hurled a 16-inning, 3–2 victory, the third-most innings pitched in a game in league history, behind Johnny Hetki (18, in 1951-52) and Alex Carrasquel (17, in 1946).

== Personal life ==
Waslewski attended Berlin High School in Berlin, Connecticut and the University of Connecticut.

His elder son, Gary Jr., was a pitcher at Princeton University before becoming an orthopedic surgeon in the Arizona area, specializing in sports medicine.
