= Jerry Stephenson =

American baseball player (1943–2010)

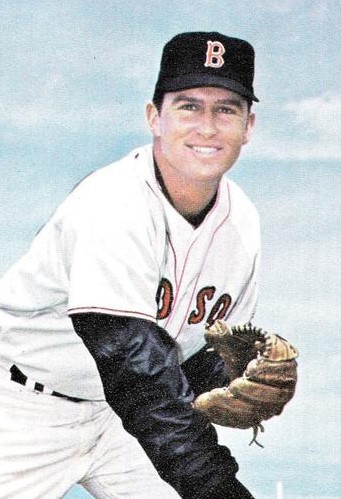
- Pitcher
- Born: October 6, 1943; Detroit, Michigan, U.S.
- Died: June 6, 2010 (aged 66); Anaheim, California, U.S.
- Batted: Left Threw: Right

MLB debut
- April 14, 1963, for the Boston Red Sox

Last MLB appearance
- September 21, 1970, for the Los Angeles Dodgers

MLB statistics
- Win–loss record: 8–19
- Earned run average: 5.70
- Strikeouts: 184
- Stats at Baseball Reference

Teams
- Boston Red Sox (1963, 1965–1968); Seattle Pilots (1969); Los Angeles Dodgers (1970)

Jerry Joseph Stephenson (October 6, 1943 – June 6, 2010) was an American Major League Baseball pitcher and longtime scout. As a player, he appeared for all or parts of seven seasons for the Boston Red Sox (1963; 1965–68), Seattle Pilots (1969) and Los Angeles Dodgers (1970). Born in Detroit, Michigan, and raised in Hermosa Beach and Anaheim, California, Stephenson was a graduate of Anaheim High School and California State University, Fullerton. He threw right-handed, batted left-handed, and was listed as 6 feet 2 inches (1.88 m) tall and 185 pounds (84 kg).

The son of former MLB catcher and longtime Boston scout Joe Stephenson, Jerry Stephenson signed a bonus contract with the Red Sox upon his high school graduation in June 1961. He was regarded as a top prospect until he hurt his elbow while pitching for the 1964 Seattle Rainiers of the Triple-A Pacific Coast League; until he was injured, he had posted a 6–4 record and an ERA of 1.57 in 14 starts, along with 97 strikeouts and only 61 hits allowed in 92 innings pitched. Six years later, as a veteran, he went 18–5 with a 2.82 ERA in 28 starts for the Triple-A Spokane Indians, the Dodgers' top affiliate, pitching for manager Tommy Lasorda.

During his MLB career, Stephenson compiled a won–lost record of 8–19, 184 strikeouts, three complete games, one save, and a 5.70 earned run average in 67 games (33 as a starting pitcher) and 238 1/3 innings pitched. He allowed 265 hits and 145 bases on balls. His one save came on August 19, 1967, during the Red Sox "Impossible Dream" season. Stephenson got the last two outs against the California Angels to close out a wild 12–11 Red Sox victory at Fenway Park. He also pitched in relief during Game 4 of the 1967 World Series.

Following in his father's footsteps, Stephenson spent 36 years as a Major League scout, working with the Dodgers (1974–94) and Red Sox (1995–2009) before his retirement to part-time status after the 2009 season. His son Brian Stephenson, a former minor league pitcher, is a regional crosschecker for the Dodgers — the third generation of the family to serve as an MLB scout.

Stephenson died from cancer at his home in Anaheim on Sunday, June 6, 2010, at the age of 66.

== See also ==
- List of second-generation Major League Baseball players
