= Hank Fischer =

American baseball player (born 1940)

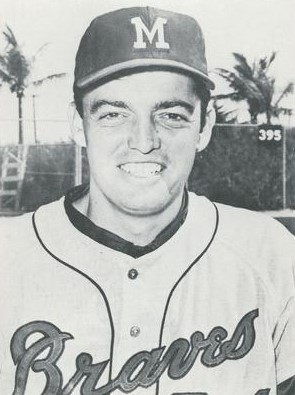
- Pitcher
- Born: January 11, 1940 (age 86); Yonkers, New York, U.S.
- Batted: Right Threw: Right

MLB debut
- April 16, 1962, for the Milwaukee Braves

Last MLB appearance
- August 8, 1967, for the Boston Red Sox

MLB statistics
- Win–loss record: 30–39
- Earned run average: 4.23
- Strikeouts: 369
- Stats at Baseball Reference

Teams
- Milwaukee / Atlanta Braves (1962–1966); Cincinnati Reds (1966); Boston Red Sox (1966–1967)

Henry William Fischer (born January 11, 1940) is an American former pitcher in Major League Baseball who played with three different teams between 1962 and 1967. Listed at 6 feet (1.83 m) tall and 190 pounds (86 kg), he batted and threw right-handed.

Fischer was signed by the Milwaukee Braves as a free agent in 1959 out of the Seton Hall University. He entered the majors in 1962 with the Braves, playing for them for four full seasons in Milwaukee and a half-season in Atlanta, before joining the Cincinnati Reds (1966) and Boston Red Sox (1966–1967). With the 1964 Braves, he posted career-highs in wins (11), starts (28), complete games (9), and innings pitched (168 1/3).

In a six-season career, Fischer posted a 30–39 record with 369 strikeouts and a 4.23 ERA in 168 appearances, including 77 starts, 14 complete games, five shutouts, seven saves, and 546 2/3 innings of work.

Fischer currently lives in Florida. He stated that one of his favorite memories from baseball is the 1964 season, when he threw 5 shutout games.
