= Frank Umont =

American baseball umpire (1917–1991)

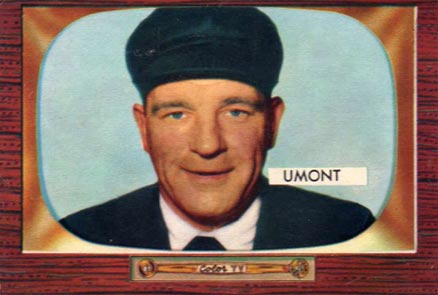
- Born: November 21, 1917; Staten Island, New York, U.S.
- Died: June 20, 1991 (aged 73); Fort Lauderdale, Florida, U.S.
- Occupation: American League Umpire
- Years active: 1954 – 1973
- Employer: American League
- Height: 6 ft 0 in (183 cm)

Frank William Umont (November 21, 1917 – June 20, 1991) was an American umpire in the American League of Major League Baseball from 1954 to 1973. He was the first major league umpire to wear spectacles while officiating.

== Career ==
=== Early career ===
Umont played guard for the New York Giants from 1944–1948. He began umpiring two years later.

=== Notable games ===
He called balls and strikes for the 1971 All-Star Game in which Reggie Jackson's mammoth home run off Dock Ellis struck a transformer on the right-center field roof of Tiger Stadium. The American League went on to a 6–4 victory, the junior circuit's only triumph in a 20-year period between 1963 and 1982. Umpires on that crew included eventual Hall of Fame inductee Doug Harvey from the National League; Don Denkinger, who would go on to work in the AL for 29 seasons and is best remembered for his missed call in Game 6 of the 1985 World Series; and Jake O'Donnell, who left umpiring after that season to focus on his NBA officiating career, which would see him work the NBA Finals in every season from 1972 through 1994.

Umont was the home plate umpire for the final game in the original Yankee Stadium prior to its two-year closure for renovations. The Detroit Tigers defeated the New York Yankees 8–5 on September 30, 1973. He was also the home plate umpire for Tom Phoebus' no-hitter on April 27, 1968.

== Later life and death ==
Umont faced mandatory retirement in 1973. He died in 1991 following a heart attack at his Florida home. He had continued to umpire in baseball fantasy camps until the previous year.

== See also ==
- List of Major League Baseball umpires (disambiguation)
