= José Santiago (1960s pitcher) =

Puerto Rican baseball player (born 1940)

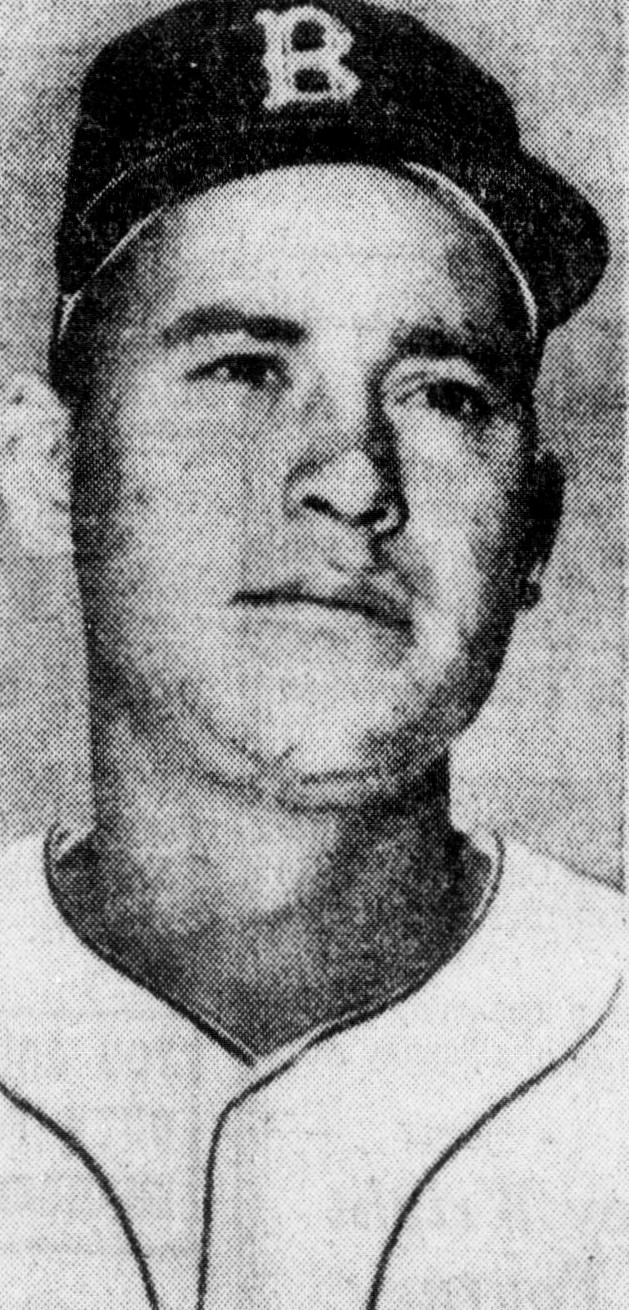
- Santiago, circa 1967
- Pitcher
- Born: August 15, 1940 (age 85); Juana Díaz, Puerto Rico
- Batted: Right Threw: Right

MLB debut
- September 9, 1963, for the Kansas City Athletics

Last MLB appearance
- July 6, 1970, for the Boston Red Sox

MLB statistics
- Win–loss record: 34–29
- Earned run average: 3.74
- Strikeouts: 404
- Stats at Baseball Reference

Teams
- Kansas City Athletics (1963–1965); Boston Red Sox (1966–1970)

Career highlights and awards
- All-Star (1968)

José Rafael Santiago Alfonso (born August 15, 1940) is a Puerto Rican former right-handed professional baseball pitcher. He played in Major League Baseball (MLB) from 1963 to 1970 for the Kansas City Athletics and Boston Red Sox. In the LBPPR, Santiago won 100 games in 13 seasons. He also played in the minor leagues, the Negro League, Cuba and the Dominican Republic.

== Early life ==
Santiago was born on August 15, 1940, in Juana Díaz, Puerto Rico, one of three children born to Alejandro Santiago and Mérida Alfonso. Alejandro played amateur baseball. Santiago's nickname was "Palillo" (toothpick). He played the outfield in high school, but became a pitcher in college at Pontificia Universidad Católica de Puerto Rico, which he attended for two years.

== Professional baseball ==
=== Kansas City Athletics ===
Santiago was originally scouted by the New York Giants, and went to spring training with them. However, the Giants had not paid Santiago the money agreed to under their contract, while promising it was forthcoming. When the Giants assigned him to pitch for their minor league Class D team, still promising his unpaid bonus was coming, Santiago returned to Puerto Rico and to college. He later signed with the Kansas City Athletics for $15,000, which was paid up-front.

Santiago was in the Athletics' minor league system from 1959 to 1963, and for most of 1965. Possessor of an outstanding curveball, Santiago was called up to Kansas City in 1963, pitching in four games. His first game was in September 1963 against the reigning world champion New York Yankees. He pitched one inning, retiring all three batters he faced, and he was the official winning pitcher in the game.

In 1964, he pitched 34 games for the Athletics, mostly as a relief pitcher, with six losses and a 4.73 earned run average (ERA). In 1965, he pitched almost the whole season for the Vancouver Mounties of the Triple-A Pacific Coast League, with a 6–3 win-loss record, 2.19 ERA, and 135 strikeouts in 119 innings pitched. At the end of the 1965 season, his contract rights were sold to the Boston Red Sox. The Athletics were managed by Haywood Sullivan in 1965, and he moved to Boston as player personnel director in 1966, and he was the one who wanted Santiago to join the Red Sox.

=== Boston Red Sox ===
The 1966 Red Sox finished with a record of 72–90, and were in second-to-last place in the standings, 26 games behind the eventual world champion Baltimore Orioles. Santiago had a 12–13 record (the most wins on the Red Sox) and 3.66 ERA. In 1967, the Red Sox won the American League (AL) title, and played in a seven-game World Series, under manager Dick Williams, losing to the St. Louis Cardinals.

Santiago was a key member of the Red Sox pitching staff in 1967, posting a 12–4 record with a 3.59 ERA in 50 games. His .750 winning percentage was highest in the league. His final eight wins were consecutive, at the end of the season, including a September 30, 1967 game he started and won against the Twins that created a tie for first place. As he walked off the field after seven innings of pitching, the Boston fans gave him a standing ovation for his performance that day. The Red Sox won the pennant the next day.

Santiago was largely a middle relief pitcher that season, starting only 11 games, and compiled an 8–3 mark in relief with five saves. However, he also made several important starts, including Game 1 of the 1967 World Series, which he lost to Hall of Famer Bob Gibson, 2–1, accounting for the only Boston run with a home run in his first World Series plate appearance. He was the first Latin pitcher to start Game 1 of a World Series.

Although Santiago lost both of his World Series decisions to the St. Louis Cardinals and compiled an ERA of 5.59, he began the 1968 campaign in the Boston rotation. He compiled a 9–4 record with a 2.25 ERA in 18 starts before an elbow injury, resulting from a collision with his catcher Mike Ryan, ended his season and derailed his career.

In 1969, he reinjured his elbow in spring training and had elbow surgery. He began 1969 with the Triple-A Louisville Colonels, going 7–4 with a 3.62 ERA. After that, however, he appeared in only 18 more major league games with the Red Sox during 1969 and 1970, pitching only 19 innings, and never won another major league game. He did not play for the Red Sox in 1971, but played in 32 games at Louisville, going 7–6 with a 4.08 ERA.

Santiago ended his major league career with 163 appearances, 34 victories and 29 losses and an ERA of 3.74. He also was selected to the 1968 MLB All-Star Game.

=== Winter baseball and manager ===
From 1972 to 1975, he played winter baseball in Puerto Rico, and played Mexican League baseball in 1976. In 1979, Santiago managed in a short-lived Triple-A circuit, the Inter-American League, as skipper of the San Juan Boricuas. His club won 16 of 55 games (.291), ending sixth and last in the six-team league, and folded June 17. Thirteen days later, the entire league shut down.

== Personal life ==
In 1980, he founded a boys baseball school in Puerto Rico, the Academia Beisbol Palillo Santiago, which he ran for 10–15 years; and was highly involved in Little League baseball in Puerto Rico. Santiago was inducted into the Puerto Rico Sports Hall of Fame in 1987. He was also inducted into the Puerto Rican Baseball Hall of Fame and the Caribbean Series Hall of Fame. In 1999, the LBPPR included him in its 20th century team.

After he retired, Santiago became a longtime play-by-play announcer, and general manager, for the Cangrejeros de Santurce of the Liga de Béisbol Profesional Roberto Clemente (the Santurce Crabbers), and was also the voice of the Senadores de San Juan (five years) and the Gigantes de Carolina (2004–2006). For some time during the 1980s, Santiago was also a boxing promoter in Puerto Rico; several of his boxing promotions were televised locally. He was also a professional wrestling announcer during the 1980s.

== Sources ==
- Bucek, Jeanine, editorial director, The Baseball Encyclopedia: 10th Edition. New York: Macmillan USA, 1996.
