= Billy Rohr =

American baseball player (born 1945)

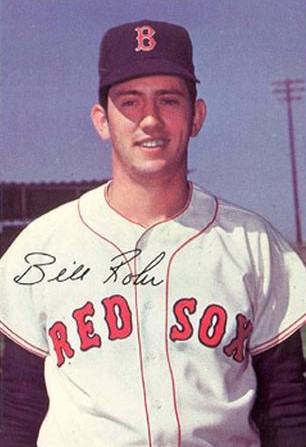
- Pitcher
- Born: July 1, 1945 (age 80); San Diego, California, U.S.
- Batted: Left Threw: Left

MLB debut
- April 14, 1967, for the Boston Red Sox

Last MLB appearance
- June 26, 1968, for the Cleveland Indians

MLB statistics
- Win–loss record: 3–3
- Earned run average: 5.64
- Strikeouts: 21
- Stats at Baseball Reference

Teams
- Boston Red Sox (1967); Cleveland Indians (1968)

William Joseph Rohr (born July 1, 1945) is an American attorney and former professional baseball starting pitcher. He played in Major League Baseball (MLB) for the Boston Red Sox and Cleveland Indians in 1967 and 1968, respectively. Listed at 6 feet 3 inches (1.91 m) and 170 pounds (77 kg), he batted and threw left-handed.

== Biography ==
Rohr was originally signed by the Pittsburgh Pirates in 1963 out of Bellflower High School, but was selected by the Red Sox a year later in the Rule 5 draft. He spent the 1964 season playing for Boston teams in the New York–Penn League and Florida Instructional League. He reached Triple-A with the Toronto Maple Leafs of the International League in 1965.

As a 21-year-old rookie, Rohr made his first MLB start at the New York Yankees' home opener on April 14, 1967. The slim left-hander faced future Hall of Famer Whitey Ford, and was one strike away from a no-hitter when Elston Howard hit a soft single into right-center field. Rohr proceeded to retire the next batter for a 3–0 shutout. His no-hit bid is also remembered for an over-the-shoulder diving catch made by left fielder Carl Yastrzemski to record the first out of the ninth inning. In his next start, Rohr beat the Yankees again, this time 6–1, but only won one more game in the majors after that.

In a two-season major league career, Rohr posted a 3–3 record with a 5.64 ERA in 27 appearances spanning 60 2/3 innings of work, including eight starts, two complete games, one shutout, 21 strikeouts, and 32 walks.

Rohr spent 1969 with the Portland Beavers, and had an 11–9 record in 23 games. Before the 1970 season, Rohr was traded by the Indians to the Detroit Tigers organization. He pitched for the Toledo Mud Hens from 1970 to 1971, and was converted to a relief pitcher in his second season. He spent the 1972 season in the Tigers and Montreal Expos organizations before retiring from the game.

Rohr became a medical malpractice attorney in California, close to his hometown and to where he went to law school at Western State University after his career ended.
