= Bill Kinnamon =

American baseball umpire (1919–2011)

Kinnamon

William Ervin Kinnamon (May 13, 1919 – April 16, 2011) was an American umpire in Major League Baseball who worked in the American League from 1960 to 1969. Kinnamon officiated in the 1968 World Series, and in the All-Star Game in 1962 (second game) and 1968. He went on to become an umpiring instructor, and he operated one of the two principal umpiring schools for several years.

== Early life ==
Born in Lincoln, Nebraska, Kinnamon graduated from Lincoln High School and the University of Nebraska, where he earned a degree in business administration. He played fullback on the football team and catcher on the baseball team at Nebraska. He was stationed in Alaska while with the US Army during World War II. After the war, he worked for the Internal Revenue Service before attending umpire school.

Kinnamon began his umpiring career in the Sooner State League in 1953, moving up to the Pioneer League (1954), the Eastern League (1955–56) and the American Association (1956–60) before joining the American League staff in September 1960. He married Anneliese Brown in 1959.

== Major league umpiring ==
During the 1961 season, Kinnamon became a part of history as the home plate umpire during Roger Maris' record-breaking single-season 61st home run, which was hit on October 1 to break Babe Ruth's single-season record.

Through the course of his career, Kinnamon worked roughly 1,500 games including the 1962 and 1968 All-Star Games and the 1968 World Series. He later founded his own umpiring school. After retiring from field duties due to a June 1969 injury, he became an umpiring supervisor, and then the chief instructor in the major leagues' new Umpire Specialization Course, which later became the Umpire Development Program. He eventually began running the training program independently, operating one of the two principal umpiring schools from 1974 to 1981 in San Bernardino, California and St. Petersburg, Florida before selling the school to umpire Joe Brinkman, who had been an instructor in Kinnamon's program since 1973. A resident of Daytona Beach, Florida throughout his major league career, he later relocated to Largo, Florida.

== Death ==
Kinnamon died in Clearwater, Florida, at the age of 91.
