= Dalton Jones =

American baseball player (born 1943)

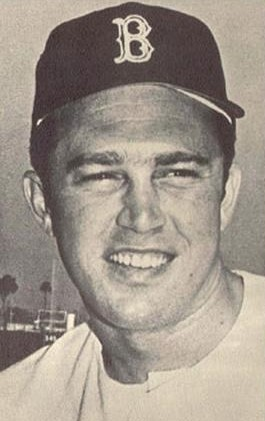
- Infielder
- Born: December 10, 1943 (age 82); McComb, Mississippi, U.S.
- Batted: Left Threw: Right

MLB debut
- April 17, 1964, for the Boston Red Sox

Last MLB appearance
- October 4, 1972, for the Texas Rangers

MLB statistics
- Batting average: .235
- Home runs: 41
- Runs batted in: 237
- Stats at Baseball Reference

Teams
- Boston Red Sox (1964–1969); Detroit Tigers (1970–1972); Texas Rangers (1972)

James Dalton Jones (born December 10, 1943) is an American former professional baseball player who played nine seasons in Major League Baseball for the Boston Red Sox (1964–1969), Detroit Tigers (1970–1972), and Texas Rangers (1972).

== Biography ==
Born in McComb, Mississippi, Jones was principally a utility infielder and pinch-hitter. He played 262 games at second base, 186 at third base, 158 at 1st base, 18 in the outfield, and 1 at shortstop. In 907 major league games, he compiled a .235 batting average with 548 hits, 268 runs scored, 237 runs batted in, 91 doubles, 19 triples, 41 home runs, and 20 stolen bases.

Jones was a highly recruited prospect while playing at Baton Rouge High School. To gain the edge in recruiting, the Red Sox involved Jones' boyhood hero Ted Williams in the effort, and Jones ended up signing with Boston.

== The Red Sox ==
Jones played for the Red Sox from 1964 to 1969. He had his best season in 1967, the Red Sox "Impossible Dream" season. Jones led the American League with 13 pinch hits and had a career-high .289 batting average. He also had several key hits for the Red Sox during the pennant drive. On September 18, 1967, he hit a 10th-inning home run in Detroit to beat the Tigers. In the last two games of the season, Jones went 3-for-5 and scored the game-winning run in the final regular season game. Jones also gave a tremendous performance in the 1967 World Series. He was Boston's starting third baseman in Games 1–4 and served as a pinch hitter in two other games. He was 7-for-18 with a .389 batting average and .421 on-base percentage in the World Series—second only to Carl Yastrzemski (who hit .400 for the Series) among the Red Sox.

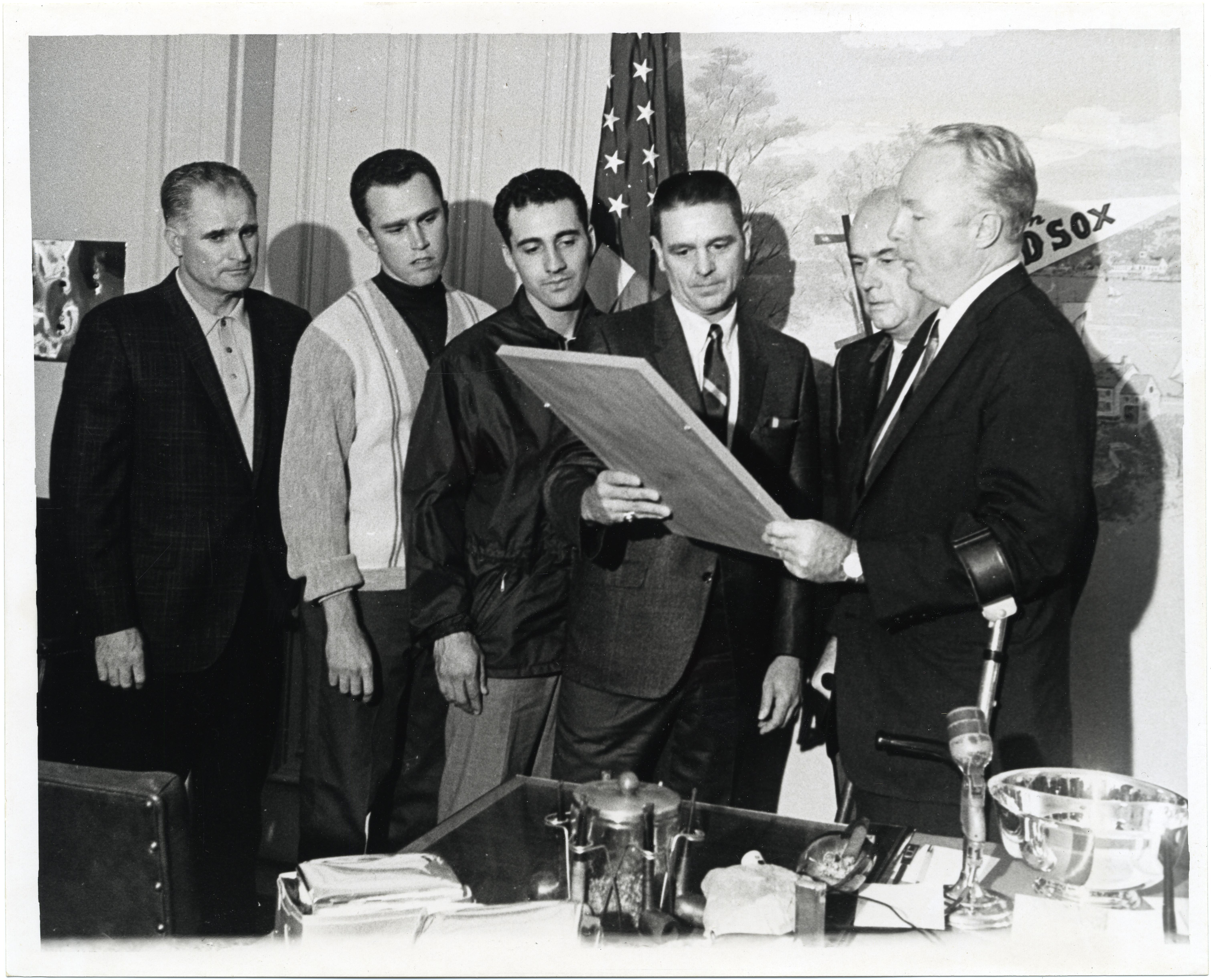
Jones (second from left) and other Red Sox personnel with Mayor of Boston John F. Collins (at right) in October 1967

== Detroit Tigers ==
Jones was traded to the Detroit Tigers before the 1970 season. He played two seasons with the Tigers. On July 9, 1970, Jones hit a towering fly ball into the right field upper deck in Detroit with the bases loaded. What should have been a grand slam ended up being a three-RBI single, as Jones passed teammate Don Wert between first and second base. Jones was called out but the three baserunners scored. Interviewed in July 2006, Jones blamed Wert for the embarrassing incident that Jones is now best remembered for. The ball was a towering fly ball, which may or may not have had the distance to make it into the right field overhang at old Tiger Stadium. Jones felt that Wert should have been halfway to second base, prepared to advance if it was a home run, and prepared to return to first if it was caught. Instead, Jones recalled that Wert was returning to first to tag up. Jones says he was already at first when the ball landed in the upper deck, and he passed Wert just 1 or 2 steps past first base.

== Texas Rangers ==
Jones' major league career ended in 1972 with the Texas Rangers managed by his boyhood hero, Ted Williams, who had helped scout and sign Jones for the Red Sox when Jones was a high school senior.

== Peninsula Whips ==
In 1973, Jones played with the Peninsula Whips, the Triple-A team in the Montreal Expos organization. After that effort, Jones realized he would not be making a comeback and retired from baseball. He made a comeback of sorts in 1989 in the Senior Professional Baseball League wherein as a member of the Winter Haven Super Sox, his most significant contribution was to introduce teammate Bernie Carbo to Jesus Christ. As Bernie Carbo recounts, "I met a former major leaguer, Dalton Jones, at a swimming pool in Winter Haven, Florida. he told me about Jesus and explained the difference Jesus could make in a life as troubled as mine. I prayed that day, and I believe Jesus began to work within my heart."

After his playing career ended, Jones worked for a time at a bank and spent five years working for Exxon.
