= 1966 Boston Red Sox season =

Major League Baseball season

1966 Boston Red Sox
- League: American League
- Ballpark: Fenway Park
- City: Boston, Massachusetts
- Record: 72–90 (.444)
- League place: 9th
- Owners: Tom Yawkey
- President: Tom Yawkey
- General managers: Dick O'Connell
- Managers: Billy Herman (64–82); Pete Runnels (8–8)
- Television: WHDH-TV, Ch. 5
- Radio: WHDH-AM 850 (Ken Coleman, Ned Martin, Mel Parnell)
- Stats: ESPN.com; Baseball Reference

The 1966 Boston Red Sox season was the 66th season in the franchise's Major League Baseball history. The Red Sox finished ninth in the American League (AL) with a record of 72 wins and 90 losses, 26 games behind the AL and World Series champion Baltimore Orioles. After this season, the Red Sox would not lose 90 games again until 2012.

The Red Sox drew 811,172 fans to Fenway Park, eighth in the ten-team Junior Circuit and 16th among the 20 MLB franchises. The team's home schedule ended September 18 so that Fenway Park could be converted for use by the Boston Patriots of the American Football League, whose first home game was September 25. The Red Sox' full 162-game season also concluded early, on Tuesday, September 27, five days before the other 19 MLB clubs.

The 1966 season saw the debut of two rookies, first baseman George Scott, 22, who had captured the Triple Crown of the Double-A Eastern League in 1965, and third baseman Joe Foy, 23, who the previous year had won The Sporting News Minor League Player of the Year Award as a member of the Triple-A Toronto Maple Leafs. Both won regular jobs and Scott was selected to the 1966 AL All-Star squad. Fellow rookies Mike Andrews, 23, and Reggie Smith, 21, got their first taste of MLB action as September call-ups from Toronto.

The Red Sox were also active in the trade market, acquiring players such as John Wyatt, Lee Stange and José Tartabull who, with Scott, Foy, Smith and Andrews, will play key roles on their 1967 team.

After a terrible three months (27–47, .365) from April through June, the club was able to win 45 of its final 88 games (.511). Eventual Hall of Fame second baseman Billy Herman did not survive a second full season as the Red Sox' manager. He was fired September 8 with his 64–82 team in ninth place. Coach Pete Runnels filled in as interim manager for Boston's final 16 games, winning half of them. Then, on September 28, the day after their season ended, the Red Sox promoted Dick Williams, 37, from two-time Governors Cup champion Toronto and signed him to a one-year contract as their skipper for 1967.

== Offseason ==
- October 4, 1965: The Red Sox trade eight-year veteran starting pitcher, former 20-game winner (1963) and 4x AL All-Star Bill Monbouquette, 29, to the Detroit Tigers for catcher Jackie Moore (player to be named later), 26, second baseman George Smith, 28, and centerfielder George Thomas, 27.
- October 15, 1965: The Red Sox purchase the contract of right-handed pitcher José Santiago, 25, from the Kansas City Athletics.
- November 29, 1965:
  - In the Rule 5 draft, the Red Sox select relief pitcher Ken Sanders, 24, from the Athletics; they lose veteran outfielder Gary Geiger, 28, to the Atlanta Braves, and pitcher Bob Heffner, 27, to the Cleveland Indians.
  - Infielder Jimy Williams is drafted from the Red Sox by the St. Louis Cardinals in the 1965 first-year draft.
- November 30, 1965: The Red Sox begin to remake their infield when they unconditionally release eight-time All-Star and 2x Gold Glove Award-winning third baseman Frank Malzone, 35, and trade former starting shortstop Eddie Bressoud, 33, to the New York Mets for reserve outfielder Joe Christopher, 29.
- December 15, 1965: The Red Sox trade starting first baseman Lee Thomas, 29, to the Atlanta Braves, along with relief pitchers Arnold Earley, 32, and Jay Ritchie (PTBNL), 29, for pitchers Dan Osinski, 32, and Bob Sadowski, 27.

== Regular season ==
=== Season standings ===
American League
Team	W	L	Pct.	GB	Home	Road
Baltimore Orioles	97	63	.606	—	48‍–‍31	49‍–‍32
Minnesota Twins	89	73	.549	9	49‍–‍32	40‍–‍41
Detroit Tigers	88	74	.543	10	42‍–‍39	46‍–‍35
Chicago White Sox	83	79	.512	15	45‍–‍36	38‍–‍43
Cleveland Indians	81	81	.500	17	41‍–‍40	40‍–‍41
California Angels	80	82	.494	18	42‍–‍39	38‍–‍43
Kansas City Athletics	74	86	.463	23	42‍–‍39	32‍–‍47
Washington Senators	71	88	.447	25½	42‍–‍36	29‍–‍52
Boston Red Sox	72	90	.444	26	40‍–‍41	32‍–‍49
New York Yankees	70	89	.440	26½	35‍–‍46	35‍–‍43

=== Record vs. opponents ===
1966 American League record Sources:
Team	BAL	BOS	CAL	CWS	CLE	DET	KCA	MIN	NYY	WAS
Baltimore	—	12–6	12–6	9–9	8–10	9–9	11–5	10–8	15–3	11–7
Boston	6–12	—	9–9	11–7	7–11	8–10	9–9	6–12	8–10	8–10
California	6–12	9–9	—	8–10	10–8	9–9	9–9	11–7	11–7	7–11
Chicago	9–9	7–11	10–8	—	11–7	8–10	13–5	4–14	9–9–1	12–6
Cleveland	10–8	11–7	8–10	7–11	—	9–9	6–12	9–9	12–6	9–9
Detroit	9–9	10–8	9–9	10–8	9–9	—	6–12	11–7	11–7	13–5
Kansas City	5–11	9–9	9–9	5–13	12–6	12–6	—	8–10	5–13	9–9
Minnesota	8–10	12–6	7–11	14–4	9–9	7–11	10–8	—	8–10	14–4
New York	3–15	10–8	7–11	9–9–1	6–12	7–11	13–5	10–8	—	5–10
Washington	7–11	10–8	11–7	6–12	9–9	5–13	9–9	4–14	10–5	—

=== Opening Day lineup ===
14	George Smith	2B
24	George Thomas	CF
8	Carl Yastrzemski	LF
25	Tony Conigliaro	RF
5	George Scott	3B
11	Tony Horton	1B
6	Rico Petrocelli	SS
22	Mike Ryan	C
26	Earl Wilson	P

=== Notable transactions ===
- April 3, 1966: The Red Sox trade former All-Star second baseman Félix Mantilla, 31, to the Houston Astros for utility infielder Eddie Kasko, 34.
- April 6, 1966: The Red Sox trade catcher Russ Nixon, 31, and second baseman Chuck Schilling, 28, to the Minnesota Twins for left-hander Dick Stigman, 30, and a minor-league player to be named later, first baseman José Calero.
- June 2, 1966: The Red Sox trade "The Monster," two-time AL All-Star relief pitcher Dick Radatz, 29, to the Cleveland Indians for pitchers Don McMahon, 36, and Lee Stange, 29.
- June 7, 1966: The Red Sox select left-hander Ken Brett, 17, from El Segundo High School, as their first pick (fourth overall) in the 1966 Major League Baseball draft.
- June 13, 1966: The Red Sox trade pitchers Guido Grilli, 27, and Ken Sanders, 24, and outfielder Jim Gosger, 23, to the Kansas City Athletics for pitchers Rollie Sheldon, 29, and John Wyatt, 31, and outfielder José Tartabull, 27.
- June 14, 1966: The Red Sox trade starting pitcher Earl Wilson, 31, and reserve outfielder Joe Christopher, 30, to the Detroit Tigers for outfielder Don Demeter, 30, and pitcher Julio Navarro, 32 (PTBNL).
- August 15, 1966: The Red Sox acquire two pitchers: Hank Fischer, 26, from the Cincinnati Reds for two players to be named later (pitchers Rollie Sheldon and Dick Stigman), and Bill Short, 28, from the Baltimore Orioles for cash considerations. The Red Sox also announce that they have sold pitcher Bob Sadowski to the Toronto Maple Leafs. On October 17, they will sell Short's contract to the Pittsburgh Pirates.

=== Roster ===
1966 Boston Red Sox
Roster
Pitchers: 28 Dennis Bennett; 27 Bucky Brandon; 38 Hank Fischer; 37 Guido Grilli; 16 Jim Lonborg; 36 Pete Magrini; 44 Don McMahon; 23 Dave Morehead; 19 Dan Osinski; 17 Dick Radatz; 18 Garry Roggenburk; 21 Bob Sadowski; 29 Ken Sanders; 30 José Santiago; 40 Rollie Sheldon; 15 Bill Short; 37 Lee Stange; 18 Jerry Stephenson; 42 Dick Stigman; 26 Earl Wilson; 26 John Wyatt	Catchers: 22 Mike Ryan; 10 Bob Tillman; Infielders: 39 Mike Andrews; 1 Joe Foy; 11 Tony Horton; 3 Dalton Jones; 2 Eddie Kasko; 6 Rico Petrocelli; 5 George Scott; 14 George Smith	Outfielders: 20 Joe Christopher; 25 Tony Conigliaro; 4 Don Demeter; 4 Jim Gosger; 7 Lenny Green; 41 Reggie Smith; 12 José Tartabull; 24 George Thomas; 8 Carl Yastrzemski	Managers: 35 Billy Herman; 32 Pete Runnels; Coaches: 31 Billy Gardner (Third base); 33 Sal Maglie (Pitching); 34 Len Okrie (Bullpen); 32 Pete Runnels (First base)

== Player stats ==
= Indicates team leader

=== Batting ===
==== Starters by position ====
Note: Pos = Position; G = Games played; AB = At bats; H = Hits; Avg. = Batting average; HR = Home runs; RBI = Runs batted in

Pos	Player	G	AB	H	Avg.	HR	RBI
C	Mike Ryan	116	369	79	.214	2	32
1B	George Scott	162	601	147	.245	27	90
2B	George Smith	128	403	86	.213	8	37
3B	Joe Foy	151	554	145	.262	15	63
SS	Rico Petrocelli	139	522	124	.238	18	59
LF	Carl Yastrzemski	160	594	165	.278	16	80
CF	Don Demeter	73	226	66	.292	9	29
RF	Tony Conigliaro	150	558	148	.265	28	93

==== Other batters ====
Note: G = Games played; AB = At bats; H = Hits; Avg. = Batting average; HR = Home runs; RBI = Runs batted in

Player	G	AB	H	Avg.	HR	RBI
Dalton Jones	115	252	59	.234	4	23
Bob Tillman	78	204	47	.230	3	24
Jose Tartabull	68	195	54	.277	0	11
George Thomas	61	173	41	.237	5	20
Eddie Kasko	58	136	29	.213	1	12
Lenny Green	85	133	32	.241	1	12
Jim Gosger	40	126	32	.254	5	17
Reggie Smith	6	26	4	.154	0	0
Tony Horton	6	22	3	.136	0	2
Mike Andrews	5	18	3	.167	0	0
Joe Christopher	12	13	1	.077	0	0

=== Pitching ===
==== Starting pitchers ====
Note: G = Games pitched; IP = Innings pitched; W = Wins; L = Losses; ERA = Earned run average; SO = Strikeouts

Player	G	IP	W	L	ERA	SO
Jose Santiago	35	172.0	12	13	3.66	119
Lee Stange	28	153.1	7	9	3.35	77
Earl Wilson	15	100.2	5	5	3.84	67
Dennis Bennett	16	75.0	3	3	3.24	77
Jerry Stephenson	15	66.1	2	5	5.83	50
Hank Fischer	6	31.0	2	3	2.90	26

==== Other pitchers ====
Note: G = Games pitched; IP = Innings pitched; W = Wins; L = Losses; ERA = Earned run average; SO = Strikeouts

Player	G	IP	W	L	ERA	SO
Jim Lonborg	45	181.2	10	10	3.86	131
Bucky Brandon	40	157.2	8	8	3.31	101
Dick Stigman	34	81.0	2	1	5.44	65
Rollie Sheldon	23	79.2	1	6	4.97	38
Bob Sadowski	11	33.1	1	1	5.40	11
Dave Morehead	12	28.0	1	2	5.46	20
Pete Magrini	3	7.1	0	1	9.82	3

==== Relief pitchers ====
Note: G = Games pitched; W = Wins; L = Losses; SV = Saves; ERA = Earned run average; SO = Strikeouts

Player	G	W	L	SV	ERA	SO
Don McMahon	49	8	7	9	2.65	57
Dan Osinski	44	4	3	2	3.61	44
John Wyatt	42	3	4	9	3.14	63
Ken Sanders	24	3	6	2	3.80	33
Dick Radatz	16	0	2	4	4.74	19
Bill Short	8	0	0	0	4.32	2
Guido Grilli	6	0	1	0	7.71	4
Garry Roggenburk	1	0	0	0	0.00	0

== Farm system ==
Level	Team	League	Manager
AAA	Toronto Maple Leafs	International League	Dick Williams
AA	Pittsfield Red Sox	Eastern League	Eddie Popowski
A	Winston-Salem Red Sox	Carolina League	Bill Slack
A	Waterloo Hawks	Midwest League	Dave Philley
A	Oneonta Red Sox	New York–Penn League	Matt Sczesny
Rookie	Covington Red Sox	Appalachian League	Rac Slider

LEAGUE CHAMPIONS: Toronto
