= Don Demeter =

American baseball player (1935–2021)

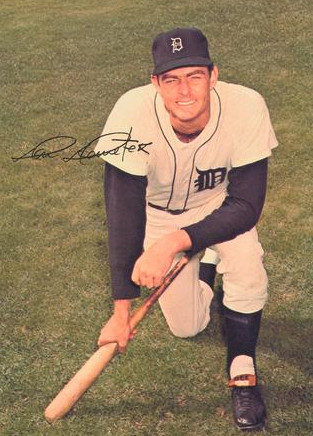
- Demeter in 1966
- Outfielder
- Born: June 25, 1935; Oklahoma City, Oklahoma, U.S.
- Died: November 29, 2021 (aged 86); Oklahoma City, Oklahoma, U.S.
- Batted: Right Threw: Right

MLB debut
- September 18, 1956, for the Brooklyn Dodgers

Last MLB appearance
- August 28, 1967, for the Cleveland Indians

MLB statistics
- Batting average: .265
- Home runs: 163
- Runs batted in: 563
- Stats at Baseball Reference

Teams
- Brooklyn / Los Angeles Dodgers (1956, 1958–1961); Philadelphia Phillies (1961–1963); Detroit Tigers (1964–1966); Boston Red Sox (1966–1967); Cleveland Indians (1967)

Career highlights and awards
- World Series champion (1959)

Donald Lee Demeter (June 25, 1935 – November 29, 2021) was an American professional baseball outfielder, third baseman, and first baseman, who played in Major League Baseball (MLB) over all or parts of 11 seasons for the Brooklyn / Los Angeles Dodgers, Philadelphia Phillies, Detroit Tigers, Boston Red Sox, and Cleveland Indians. He batted and threw right-handed and was listed as 6 feet 4 inches (1.93 m) tall and 190 pounds (86 kg).

Born and raised in Oklahoma City, Oklahoma, Demeter attended Capitol Hill High School, where he was one of 11 players signed by MLB teams. After a few years of minor league ball, he debuted with the Brooklyn Dodgers in 1956. After spending 1957 in the minor leagues, he played 43 games for the Dodgers (now in Los Angeles) in 1958, then became the regular center fielder for much of the 1959 season, helping the team defeat the Chicago White Sox in the 1959 World Series. A broken wrist limited him in 1960, and he was traded to the Phillies shortly after the start of the 1961 season. With Philadelphia, Demeter never failed to hit 20 home runs in a season, hitting a career-high 29 in 1962, a season in which he became the first Phillie in seven years to record 100 runs batted in (RBI) and finished ninth in the National League (NL) in hitting. September 1962 was the start of 266 consecutive errorless games for Demeter in the outfield, a Major League record that would stand for almost 30 years, until Darren Lewis broke the mark in 1994. In 1962 and 1963, he finished 12th and 21st in NL Most Valuable Player Award voting.

Before the 1964 season, Demeter was traded to the Tigers as part of a deal that sent future Hall of Famer Jim Bunning to Philadelphia. He batted .256 with 22 home runs his first year with the Tigers, then hit 16 home runs his next year, batting .278. In 1966, he lost playing time to Mickey Stanley and Jim Northrup, appearing in only 32 games before getting traded to the Boston Red Sox on June 14. He played center field regularly for Boston the rest of the year but lost the role to Reggie Smith in 1967 spring training. Demeter was traded midseason to the Cleveland Indians, where he batted .207. The Tigers almost reacquired him in late August, but the discovery of heart issues led to a void in his trade, and Demeter retired before the 1968 season.

Following his career, Demeter lived in Oklahoma City, where he started a swimming pool business, served as president of the Oklahoma City 89ers, and ran (unsuccessfully) for a seat in the Oklahoma House of Representatives as a Republican in 1976. In 2002, he started Grace Community Baptist Church in Oklahoma City, which he pastored for over 16 years. He is a member of the Oklahoma Sports Hall of Fame.

== Early life ==
Demeter was born in Oklahoma City, Oklahoma, on June 25, 1935. He was the third of four children of Lewis and Aileen Demeter. His father was a painting contractor. The family lived in Oklahoma City until Demeter was about 10, when they moved to Denver. His parents divorced about a year after the move, and Demeter returned to Oklahoma City to live with his grandparents. After his mother remarried, he lived briefly in Keene, New Hampshire, before returning to Oklahoma City to live with a foster family. His foster father, George Stevens, was a Sunday school superintendent at the Exchange Avenue Baptist Church in Oklahoma City.

In fifth grade, Demeter became interested in baseball, as this was the first time his school had organized baseball teams. "It never dawned on me that I wouldn’t play in the major leagues" he later recalled. "If I’d known the odds…” In 1945, he played in the Oklahoma City Young Men's Christian Association (YMCA) Junior League. Players for this team received free passes to see the Oklahoma City Indians of the Class AA Texas League, and Demeter and his uncle Leland were often present at Texas League Park for the games. At one of these games, Don Hoak signed an autograph for him; the two would later be roommates while they both played for the Philadelphia Phillies. He played basketball and football as well, but baseball was his favorite sport.

Demeter attended Capitol Hill High School, where, as a center fielder, he helped the baseball team win the state championship in both his junior (1952) and senior (1953) year. In his senior year, his team won 59 games of 60. He was the only member of the Capitol Hill High School starting varsity team that was never chosen to be on the Oklahoma City All-Star prep team, yet he would be the only one to experience success in Major League Baseball (MLB). Besides playing for the school team, in the early 1950s Demeter played ball for the American Legion's Mosier's Tiremen of Oklahoma City.

After graduation, the New York Yankees signed two Capitol Hill players, while the Brooklyn Dodgers signed Demeter and eight of his teammates. This was partly due to the influence of John Pryor, the Capitol Hill coach as well as a scout for the Dodgers. However, Bert Wells was the Dodger scout who signed him. While each of his classmates received a $3,000 signing bonus, Demeter was given only $800.

== Minor league career ==
After signing with the Dodgers, Demeter was assigned to the Minor League Class D Sooner State League Shawnee Hawks. For his first season of professional baseball, he was paid a salary of $150 a month. In 104 games for the Hawks, Demeter had a .223 batting average to go with nine home runs, six triples, and 42 runs batted in (RBI). For the 1954 season, Demeter was promoted to the Class C California League Bakersfield Indians, where he hit .267 with 26 home runs and 89 RBI. After the season, he complained, "I don't enjoy baseball. I'm not sure I should continue it", feeling that he could live a more useful life. However, his passion for the game was reinvigorated after the 1954 World Series. "When I saw Alvin Dark tithed the church from his 1954 World Series share, I realized that baseball could have a very real meaning."

In December 1954, Demeter decided to put in some extra playing time and experience by going to Venezuela and playing for Cabimas of the Venezuelan Occidental League. Over 33 games, he hit .306 with 15 RBI, more than half of which came from two grand slams.

He began the 1955 season with the Class A Pueblo Dodgers of the Western League. Demeter hit .262 with 5 home runs and 23 RBI in 39 games before being promoted to the Class AA Southern Association Mobile Bears. In 92 games at Mobile, he hit .251 with 11 home runs and 36 RBI.

Rejoining Cabimas for winter league play in 1955–56, Demeter batted .433 with seven home runs and 12 RBI in his first 60 at bats. On January 21, 1956, he tied the Venezuelan record of 16 home runs in a season, hitting two in the game. He finished the winter-ball season second in the league in batting average with a .369 mark and tied for first in home runs with 17, compiling 73 hits and 38 runs scored in 52 games.

Back in the United States, Demeter was assigned to Texas League's Fort Worth Cats for the 1956 season. He hit home runs on four consecutive days from April 24 to 27, and six in his last seven games, a new league record. On May 20, he had a five-hit day that included his 10th home run of the season in a 17–4 victory over San Antonio. Demeter finished the year with 41 home runs and 128 RBI, both second only to minor league journeyman Ken Guettler, who had 143 RBI and shattered the Texas League record for home runs with 62. Demeter also was very busy in center field for the Cats, leading the league in putouts with 442. He was selected to the Texas League All-Star Team, receiving a scroll and a $100 check. Fort Worth General Manager Spencer Harris said, "He's ahead of Duke Snider at a similar stage in Duke's development."

After the minor league season, Demeter was a September call-up by the Dodgers. He played his first major league game on September 18 against the St. Louis Cardinals, pinch-hitting in the bottom of the 3rd inning for pitcher Roger Craig. He struck out against Vinegar Bend Mizell, taking all three strikes looking. The next day against the Cardinals, Demeter recorded his first major league hit and home run, driving a 2–1 pitch from Don Liddle into the left field stands to contribute to a 17–2 victory. He finished the season with one hit in three at bats.

Left off the Dodgers' 1956 World Series roster, Demeter did join the team for an exhibition tour in Japan following the season. In the 18 game series, the Dodgers went 14–4 as he batted over .300 with five home runs, one behind Snider and Gil Hodges for the team lead. During the tour, Dodgers Vice President Buzzie Bavasi claimed that the prospect looked ready for the majors. National League (NL) president Warren Giles gave him very high praise, saying that he "should make the grade as a regular with the Dodgers next season. He played outstanding ball in Japan." On November 2, Bavasi announced that he would be one of the prospects invited to an early tryout training camp at Vero Beach, Florida the next February. Brooklyn President Walter O'Malley announced during the Japan tour his plans to move Snider over to left field to make room for Demeter in center.

Before the 1957 season, Demeter was rated as one of the top eight rookie prospects in February in a poll of 12 major league organizations. In a preseason exhibition rematch of the previous year's World Series, the Dodgers beat the Yankees 1–0 in 11 innings. In the game, Demeter hit a double, then later scored on a wild throw by Gil McDougald as he ran to third. Overall, Demeter failed to impress during spring training. Cut from major league camp by the Dodgers on March 31, he was optioned to the Class AAA St. Paul Saints of the American Association.

Demeter started the season with St. Paul very strong, hitting .350 with 35 RBI and a league-leading 12 home runs through June 5. On July 4, he helped his team overcome an 8–1 deficit by hitting three home runs to help the Saints beat the Minneapolis Millers 9–8. Two days later, he was selected to the American Association All-Star team on July 6, 1957. He was one of only four unanimous picks by the league's broadcasters and writers.

On July 14, Demeter had to leave a game after severely pulling a tendon in his left hand. He returned on August 2 to pinch hit a game-winning double in the 10th inning to beat Louisville 3–2. However, the injury severely limited his play all the way to September.

Demeter finished the season among the league leaders in several categories. He was third in the league with 28 home runs, fifth in on-base plus slugging (OPS) with a mark of .940, third in stolen bases with 13, and third in slugging percentage with a mark of .562. Demeter recorded 86 RBI and a .309 batting average in 134 games. He was not called up by the Dodgers at the end of the year partly because, by the time St. Paul was eliminated from the playoffs, Brooklyn had only five games remaining on their schedule. Demeter was selected to the All-AAA team and appeared on The Ed Sullivan Show with the rest of the honorees on September 29.

== Los Angeles Dodgers ==
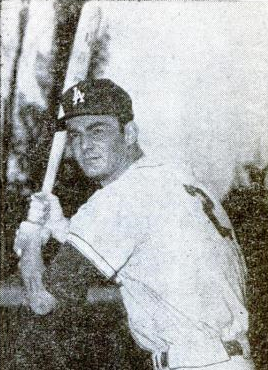
Demeter in 1959

=== 1958 season ===
At the start of the 1958 season, The Sporting News listed Demeter as the "kid with greatest potential" and the "best bet for batting title" in the Dodgers' organization. The team had relocated to Los Angeles, California, following the 1957 campaign. After serving a six-month term with the Army in San Antonio, Texas, Demeter was discharged on April 17, 1958 and left to immediately join the major league Dodgers in Los Angeles. Playing time was scarce for him, as he only appeared in six games before being optioned back to St. Paul on May 9. In 80 games with St. Paul, he hit .283 with 14 home runs and 48 RBI.

Demeter was recalled by the Dodgers on July 30, when Randy Jackson's rights were sold to the Cleveland Indians for $20,000. In the month of August, Demeter hit .148 with one home run and two RBI in 54 at bats. His numbers went up in mid-September, as he batted .263 with four home runs in his final 12 games. He finished 1958 with a .189 batting average, five home runs, and eight RBI in 43 games for Los Angeles.

=== 1959 season ===
On February 16, 1959, Demeter signed a new contract with the Dodgers for $8,500. By that year, he was the only one of the Capitol Hill alumni signed after his senior year who was still in professional organized baseball in any capacity. At the Dodgers camp in Vero Beach, Florida, he took the time to try to reinvent himself as a hitter. Previously, he had always tried for home runs, which resulted in 32 strikeouts in 106 at bats in 1958. Manager Walter Alston and new coach Pee Wee Reese worked with him on his swing. Believing Demeter was upper-cutting at the ball, Reese had him cut down on his swing. Alston had Demeter stand outside the batting cage and hit ground balls to the infielders while waiting for his turn in the cage. Demeter and Alston agreed that the simple exercise helped level off Demeter's swing. While adapting his new batting style, Demeter pulled a muscle in his right leg on February 27. It was not serious, and he returned to spring training play in less than a week. On March 12, he had a game-winning single with the bases loaded against the Cincinnati Reds in the 9th inning to give the Dodgers the 7–6 win.

The Dodgers finally carried out their plan to make Demeter their center fielder, though they shifted Snider over to right field instead of left. He did not play on Opening Day, as Snider played center and the left-handed hitting Ron Fairly got the start in right field against the right-handed pitching Bob Anderson of the Chicago Cubs. The next day, Demeter was given his first start of the season with the temperature around 40 degrees Fahrenheit. He made the best early impression he could, hitting a home run and a single while driving in two runs as the Dodgers prevailed by a score of 5–3. After pinch-hitting in the third game of the year, he hit back-to-back home runs in games four and five. Snider's lingering knee problems helped cement Demeter's place as the team's starting center fielder.

On April 21 against the San Francisco Giants, Demeter hit three home runs and had six RBI. In the third inning off Giants pitcher Dom Zanni, he hit the first ever inside-the-park home run at the Los Angeles Memorial Coliseum. The next inning saw another home run, this time to deep left off of Mike McCormick. He capped off the performance by hitting a game winning walk-off two-run home run in the bottom of the 11th inning off Al Worthington to win the game 9–7. As of July 2009, only 22 players in the history of the majors since 1900 had three home runs in a single game during their rookie season. Demeter was the first Dodger and ninth overall to accomplish the feat, sharing the accomplishment with Hall of Famers Eddie Mathews and Mickey Cochrane. The next morning, a photographer got Demeter out of bed at five o'clock in the morning to take photos for an afternoon Los Angeles newspaper. In his first 15 games, he hit .345 with six home runs and 21 RBI. Phillies manager Eddie Sawyer remarked, "Seldom have I seen a player come so far so fast. When I saw him for the first time late last season, he was just another journeyman. Now he's a real good-looking ball player."

Demeter had another multiple home run game in an 11–0 win over the Phillies on June 11. In May and June, he batted a combined .278 with 10 home runs and 34 RBI. In July and August, he batted below .160 in both months and hit only two home runs. Snider was moved back to center field on August 12, and Demeter was mainly used as a pinch hitter or defensive replacement for the rest of the year. On August 18, he dropped an "easy" pop fly against the Milwaukee Braves in the bottom of the ninth inning. Seeing that Bill Bruton was attempting to score, he fired the ball to home plate. "It was a perfect strike," Demeter described the throw. "But there was nobody there to catch it, because (John) Roseboro was out at the mound congratulating (Don) Drysdale on the victory." The Braves tied the game on his error, but the Dodgers later won 7-6 in 13 innings. On the bus ride to the hotel, Demeter shook every one of his teammate's hands, showing his appreciation for "the team's win". At season's end, the Dodgers were tied with the Braves for the NL pennant, forcing the teams to play a tie-breaker series, which the Dodgers won in two games. Reflecting on what might have happened had they lost the series, Demeter said, "My error could have lost us the World Championship."

In 139 games, Demeter hit 18 home runs and 70 RBI in 139 games. He was hit by six pitches, tied with Richie Ashburn and Tony Taylor for the fourth-highest total in the NL. However, he finished seventh in the NL with 87 strikeouts. Defensively, he had the fifth-highest fielding percentage among NL center fielders with a mark of .983.

Demeter played in all six games of the 1959 World Series for the Dodgers. He replaced Snider late in the first two games, started the next three, and came off the bench once more in the decisive game six. In 12 at bats, he hit .250, scoring two runs as the Dodgers defeated the Chicago White Sox in six games for their first World Series championship in Los Angeles. Following the example Dark had impressed him with five years earlier, Demeter tithed his World Series earnings to his church.

Early in the offseason, there were talks of trading Demeter. Near the end of November, there was a six-player deal proposed between Los Angeles and the Washington Senators, involving Washington replacing Sandy Amorós with Demeter. The Dodgers were reluctant to lose their 24-year-old hitter, offering outfielder Ron Fairly to the Senators instead. Washington continued to insist on Demeter until Los Angeles officially killed the deal on December 2. The Dodgers had confidence in Don, believing that his offense was improving.

=== 1960 and early 1961 seasons ===
Demeter signed a $14,000 one-year contract with Los Angeles on February 11, 1960. Coming into training camp, team management was pleased that he had gained 12 pounds in the offseason, raising his total weight to 185 pounds. In an intrasquad game on March 11 at Vero Beach, he hit a home run off eventual Hall of Famer Sandy Koufax.

On April 12, Demeter had his first Opening Day start in the Major Leagues. He started the majority of the team's games in center field until July 3, where he fractured his wrist on the road against the Pittsburgh Pirates after colliding with Los Angeles shortstop Maury Wills. The injury prematurely ended his season. In 64 games, he hit .274 with nine home runs and 29 RBI.

In a November interview, Bavasi expressed his belief that the ballplayer would help the 1961 Dodgers hit more home runs. "If Don can show us the Demeter of early 1959, we won't have to look for added power. We'll have all we need." It was announced on February 14, 1961, that Demeter had signed his new contract with the Dodgers for around $16,000. However, the ballplayer would have stiff competition to regain his starting role in center field. Newcomer Willie Davis, coming off a huge season in the Pacific Coast League and last season's number one player of the year as named by The Sporting News, was considered a serious threat to take his job. Davis won the role in spring training, and Demeter began the year as a reserve player.

== Philadelphia Phillies ==
=== 1961 season ===
Before Opening Day in 1961, talks had already started between the Dodgers and the Phillies about a potential trade, in which the Phillies would send reliever Turk Farrell to Los Angeles for Demeter. The trade became a reality on May 4, as Los Angeles sent Demeter and Charley Smith to Philadelphia for Farrell and Joe Koppe. Phillies manager Gene Mauch was glad about the deal, announcing after the trade that Demeter would be a starter immediately. Mauch remarked, "There aren't many better center fielders around than he is, and you can put it in the book right now that he'll hit more than 20 home runs any year he plays a full season in our park." Demeter would prove his manager correct, hitting 21, 29, and 22 home runs in his three seasons with Philadelphia.

After batting .219 for the Phillies in May, Demeter hit .337 in June, with four home runs and 21 RBI. In August 1961, the Phillies began experimenting with moving him to first base. From August 15 through 25, he racked up six home runs and 13 RBI, including three consecutive games in which he hit a home run. However, as the season dragged on, his nagging injuries caught up with him. Over the course of the year, he had to sit out for a week in May with a pulled groin muscle, several more days in June after a jammed middle finger on his right hand, and four times with a left knee injury, with the fourth occurrence shutting him down for the short remainder of the season.

On September 12, Demeter faced his old team. With the Phillies at 50 games under .500 and the Dodgers trying to stay in contention for the NL Pennant, Demeter hit three home runs and drove in seven runs en route to a 19–10 win, hurting Los Angeles's pennant chances. He finished the season with a .257 average to go along with 68 RBI and a 20 home runs. Adding his totals from Los Angeles, he batted .251 with 21 home runs and 70 RBI.

=== 1962 season ===
At the end of 1961, the Phillies had expected Demeter to be their Opening Day first baseman in 1962. Plans changed in March when Andy Carey, who the team had traded for with the expectation that he would play third base, announced his retirement. This caused the Phillies to become interested in making Demeter the third baseman. Mauch had high expectations, predicting that Demeter and Roy Sievers would be the two catalysts to help the team successfully improve upon its 47–107 record from 1961. This marked the first season where Demeter knew he would have regular playing time for the Phillies no matter what, whether it be at third base or in the outfield. "We have to have Don's bat in the lineup somewhere", said his manager.

On Opening Day, against the Reds, Demeter hit a home run and had three RBI to contribute to a 12–4 win. He had three multiple home run games throughout the season. On May 11, he had two hits and six RBI, including a third-inning grand slam against Dick Ellsworth, in a 12–2 win over the Cubs. In August, he hit .398 with a .669 slugging percentage, eight home runs, and 31 RBI in 32 games. On August 15 against the New York Mets, he attained a unique feat, hitting two home runs that day off two separate players named Bob Miller. In the third inning, he hit a homer against Bob Lane Miller, and in the ninth, he hit another against Bob Gerald Miller. Demeter's stellar play down the stretch helped the Phillies win 30 of their final 44 games, giving them a final record of 81-80.

The 1962 season was a breakout season for Demeter. He led his team in all triple crown categories and more. His home runs, RBI, and batting average were all top marks, as were his slugging percentage, OPS, and sacrifice flies. He became the first Phillie to drive in over 100 runs since Del Ennis in 1955. Against other NL players, he placed eighth in home runs with 29 (tied with Eddie Mathews and Joe Adcock), seventh in RBI with 107, ninth in batting average with a .307 mark, sixth in slugging percentage with a .520 mark, ninth in OPS with an .879 mark, 10th in at bats per home run with 19, second in times hit by a pitch with 10 (tied with Curt Flood, and first with 11 sacrifice flies (also a major league best). Demeter carried an offensive wins above replacement (WAR) mark of 5.4, seventh-best in the NL. He finished 12th in the voting for the NL Most Valuable Player Award.

Defensively, his errors were way up from last season. In 1961, Demeter had only four errors. Playing a new position in 1962, his 18 errors were fifth-worst in the NL, and his .937 fielding percentage in 105 games at third base was the worst in the NL for all players that played 60 or more games at the position. Regular centerfielder Tony González suffered a back injury in mid-August that left him hospitalized for three weeks, forcing Demeter back into his old position in the outfield for the remainder of the season. On September 1, he committed an error in a 7–6 loss to the Pirates; it would be a few years before he made another as an outfielder. After season's end, Demeter played in an October 21 exhibition game for an NL squad managed by Cardinals manager Johnny Keane in an All-Star game sponsored by the Houston Professional Baseball Players Association against a team of American League (AL) All-Stars.

=== 1963 season ===
In a move to potentially get Demeter playing left field on a regular basis, the Phillies acquired Hoak from Pittsburgh in November 1962. However, Demeter began the season playing first base, as Sievers had a broken rib. He started the season hitting .455 with four home runs and 12 RBI in an 11-game hit streak. The Cardinals finally brought his streak to a close in the second game of a doubleheader on April 21, but he had two hits in his next game.

On May 5, Demeter was involved in a dramatic play to end a game against the Houston Colt .45's. Phillies pinch hitter Wayne Graham hit a ground ball back toward Houston pitcher Hal Woodeshick, who threw the ball back to catcher John Bateman. Demeter attempted to run towards home plate from third base and collided with Bateman, knocking the ball loose and scoring the final run in a 6–5 win. On May 17, he became one of the select few in MLB history to score a run in a game against a pitcher that ended up throwing a no-hitter. Don Nottebart of Houston held the Phillies hitless, but in the fifth inning, Demeter hit a ground ball past J. C. Hartman, resulting in what was recorded as a two-base error. Clay Dalrymple dropped a bunt to successfully move Demeter to third, and he later scored on a sacrifice fly from Hoak to tie the game at 1–1. Houston went on to win the game 4–1. Demeter missed several games in May against the Colts after taking a pitch that hit his right hand on the middle and index fingers, and two more in June when he jammed his right ankle while sliding back into first base against the Cardinals on June 12. Beginning on the day of Nottebart's no-hitter, Demeter was platooned to third base. Hoak was not living up to expectations at third, hitting just .197 before being benched.

In the last half of June, Demeter had six home runs over a period of nine games. He had his second multi-homer outing of the year on June 19 at Cincinnati in a 6–5, 10-inning loss, but had 10th-inning heroics of his own on June 25 at Pittsburgh when he launched a home run against Harvey Haddix. Demeter suffered another minor injury on July 28 when Drysdale of the Dodgers hit him on his right forearm, resulting in several more missed games.

Despite the injuries, Demeter finished the season as the team leader in RBI with 83, one ahead of Sievers. He was also second in home runs with 22, behind right fielder Johnny Callison's 26. Demeter ranked sixth in the NL in at bats per home run with a mark of 23.4. His 10 intentional walks were tied with Ken Boyer for eighth in the league. Despite committing seven errors at third base, Demeter was the only MLB outfielder to finish with a perfect 1.000 fielding percentage. He tallied 63 runs scored, 20 doubles, and a .258 batting average, finishing 21st in the MVP balloting.

After the 1963 season, the Phillies began entertaining trade offers on Demeter. Pittsburgh expressed interest, but Mauch said he'd only consider the offer if Bill Mazeroski or Roberto Clemente were involved in the deal. On December 5, 1963, the Phillies traded Demeter and reliever Jack Hamilton to the Detroit Tigers for catcher Gus Triandos and eventual Hall of Famer Jim Bunning.

In a 1965 interview, Demeter alleged that when the Phillies put him at third base, they would sometimes alter the dynamics of the infield. He said, "They used to let the grass grow for me whenever I played third base over in Philly. And whenever Cal McLish pitched, they'd be out there in the afternoon wetting down the grass in front of the plate." This was designed to make ground balls to the ballplayer roll slower.

== Detroit Tigers ==
=== 1964 season ===
Tigers manager Charlie Dressen assigned Demeter to center field, moving previous starter Bruton to left. Commenting on the trade, Dressen remarked, "Demeter is a better all-around player than Rocky Colavito." Dressen's plan early on was to have Demeter bat third in the lineup against right-handed pitchers and fifth against lefties. The ballplayer was excited to perform alongside right fielder Al Kaline, saying, "I've always thought he was the greatest thing to put on a uniform." In spring training, Demeter hit .364 in his first eight games as a Tiger, including a bases-loaded three-RBI triple against the Cardinals on March 18. In 27 spring training games, he recorded 12 RBI, second only to Norm Cash.

Demeter injured his ankle in the first game of a doubleheader against the Minnesota Twins on April 19, hitting two foul balls off of it. After X-rays came back negative, he rejoined the team on April 22 against the Los Angeles Angels with a special guard for the ankle. The setback resulted in a .138 batting average in his first seven games in the AL. However, on April 26, he hit his first home run as a Tiger off Jim Kaat. On April 29, he hit a decisive home run in the top of the 10th inning against John Wyatt of the Kansas City Athletics, leading the Tigers to a 5–4 win.

On May 23, against the Indians, Demeter went back to catch a long fly ball from Leon Wagner. As he tried to catch the ball, he hit his head on a padded metal bar on top of the outfield fence. The ball bounced off his glove and over the fence, resulting in a three-run home run for the Indians. Dressen remarked that he had seen the same incident occur with Bruton on a three-run home run by Tommie Reynolds at Kansas City on April 30.

For the first two months of the season, Demeter recorded two home runs and 14 RBI in 37 games to go along with a batting average of .238. On June 8 and 9, he hit a combined two home runs and recorded nine RBI in two games against the Twins. He homered again on June 13 against the Angels, and he delivered a game-winning double on June 14 to complete a sweep of the three-game series. On July 14, Demeter hit a home run and drove in two runs, also making what was described as a "spectacular" diving catch that denied the Angels an opportunity to score the tying run in the ninth inning. He commented that the game was his best since joining the Tigers.

On July 31, Demeter set an MLB record with 206 consecutive errorless games in the outfield, passing former Phillies teammate Tony González's mark of 205. The streak began two seasons prior on September 3, 1962. The player deemphasized the record, citing it as "deceptive." He remarked, "With the Phillies, I started quite a few games at third base and went to the outfield in the late innings." He claimed that he thought he made two errors throughout the 1964 season. "I lost one ball in the sun. Another one I didn't play very well in the wind. They were scored as hits. In my mind, they are errors." At season's end, he had extended his streak to 228 games.

From August 25 to 27, against the Boston Red Sox, Demeter had game-winning hits in all three games of a Tiger sweep. In the September 7, 1964 issue of Sports Illustrated, he was named the Player of the Week for his clutch performances.

Demeter finished the 1964 season with similar numbers to the prior season with the Phillies. He had 22 home runs and 80 RBI, batting .256. The ballplayer led all MLB outfielders with a perfect 1.000 fielding percentage. He finished second on the Tigers in RBI to Cash's 83; eight of these tied games for the Tigers, and 28 gave the Tigers the go ahead run.

=== 1965 and early 1966 seasons ===
In January 1965, Demeter signed a new contract with the Tigers for the amount of $30,000. He joined Dressen on an annual press-radio-television tour that went to Toledo and outstate Michigan in late January. Demeter was cited by sportswriter Allen Lewis as the Tigers most clutch hitter, but he still was unsatisfied with his power output. He trained in Oklahoma during the winter, chopping wood and gaining 12 pounds to raise his total weight to 202. On February 5 in Tulsa, Oklahoma, Demeter was given the Art Griggs Award, presented annually to Oklahomans with the most outstanding performance at the major league level. He remarked, "I would have to thank Mickey Mantle for moving out of the state, Allie Reynolds for retiring and Warren Spahn for just getting old."

In spring training, Demeter had a two homer outing against the Washington Senators on April 2, followed by another solo home run against the Reds on April 4. He later admitted after his two-homer outing, in which he hit one over the left field wall and another over the right, that he wanted to try for a third home run over the wall in center field. However, he didn't get the chance as he was walked and subsequently pulled for a pinch runner. "It tears me up to walk when I'm swinging that good", Demeter said.

Demeter was the Opening Day starter in center field on April 12, 1965, in Kansas City. Though hit by a pitch from Moe Drabowsky in the first inning, he finished the game with hits in all three of his at bats, including a triple. He scored two runs as well. Although he began the year in the outfield, he started playing first base in May due to struggles by Cash. Later that month, Demeter sat out several games with a minor case of whiplash sustained from a head-first slide into third base.

Demeter played at first for almost every game for two months before returning to the outfield full time in July to resume his record errorless streak, only for it to abruptly come to an end at 266 games on July 15 in improbable fashion against Kansas City. Charlie Finley, the Athletics owner, had some trained dogs serving on the grounds crew at Municipal Stadium, and one of these ran onto the field as Demeter fielded a ball hit to him. The dog and the throw arrived at shortstop at about the same time, Dick McAuliffe was unable to handle the ball, and Demeter was charged with the error.

On August 12 against the Athletics, Demeter hit a grand slam and had seven RBI, tying a career high. Against the Angels the next evening, in the fifth inning, a pitch from Dean Chance struck Demeter in the head. Carried off the field in a stretcher, Demeter was hospitalized overnight, and he would miss two games. He suffered another injury against the Angels on August 27, damaging his left wrist while trying to make a diving catch on a line drive hit by Jimmy Piersall. After 12 X-rays, it was finally determined to be a sprain and not a broken wrist as originally diagnosed. It was the same wrist he broke in 1961 during his tenure with the Dodgers. Several key players were injured at the time, leading Demeter to remark, "I really feel sick for Charlie (Dressen). The poor guy gets his team where it can make a move and then injuries hit him."

Injuries limited Demeter to 122 games, in which he had 16 home runs and 58 RBI. His batting average improved over last season, jumping from .256 to .278, second to Kaline's .281 on the Tigers. He was hit by six pitches on the year, tied with Pete Ward and Willie Horton for sixth in the AL. As a pinch hitter, he batted .400, furthering his reputation as the most clutch hitter for the Tigers.

Demeter was one of the last players to sign his contract for the 1966 season, receiving a raise to $33,000 in March. Unlike years past, Demeter's spot as everyday starter in center field was not guaranteed. By March, it was already being predicted that Demeter was going to lose his position to a young Mickey Stanley, who was described by Baseball Digest as a defensive ace. Demeter had trouble with a sore right shoulder during spring training, requiring a cortisone shot. Eventually, it was officially announced that he had lost his slot in center field to Stanley.

After Stanley batted .143 in his first six games, Demeter began getting most of the starts in center field on April 19. However, from April 25 through May 3, Demeter had an 0-for-23 slump, the worst of his career. It got to the point where Dressen told him to "not pick up a bat," benching him for six games. A broken finger suffered by Stanley helped ensure Demeter's return to the lineup. On May 17 against the Yankees, he broke a 2–2 tie with a two-run homer off New York pitcher Fritz Peterson. Demeter remarked that the day was his wedding anniversary. "I've hit home runs six of the last seven years for her." Later, against the Baltimore Orioles on May 21, Demeter started a six-run rally in the fourth inning with a three-run home run off pitcher John Miller to tie the game 4–4. He again lost the starting job on May 4, as Kaline was shifted to center and Jim Northrup began getting the starts in right field. In 32 games through June 14, Demeter batted .212 with five home runs and 12 RBI.

== Boston Red Sox ==
On June 14, 1966, Demeter and Julio Navarro were traded by the Tigers to the Boston Red Sox for outfielder Joe Christopher and pitcher Earl Wilson. The Red Sox had been attempting anywhere from several weeks to several months to obtain Demeter, offering a combination of catcher Bob Tillman and an infielder, but the Tigers continually rejected the offers. Boston manager Billy Herman had known Demeter ever since he was a coach for the Dodgers several years prior, and he had wanted Demeter for the Red Sox since becoming Boston's manager in September 1964. "He is a good hitter with power. I know he will take good advantage of our left field wall." Herman went on to say, "One of the things I like best about Demeter is that I can use him at five positions. He can play anywhere in the outfield, and he can play both first and third base. Don will shake up a few people on this club." Though he planned to put Demeter in center field, he was also considering using the player at third base, where Joe Foy had been struggling offensively. Herman also said he could use Demeter at first base should rookie George Scott need any sort of rest.

Demeter went from a benchwarmer in Detroit to being an everyday starter once again in Boston. In his first game for the Sox on June 17, he hit a home run off Orioles pitcher Steve Barber to tie the game at 2–2, though Boston would go on to lose 5–3. From his opening performance through the end of the month, he raised his batting average over 40 points by batting .348 with three home runs and eight RBI. However, various ailments would diminish his playing time. In July, a foul tip hit him on the knee, costing him a few games. Later that month, he had back problems that forced him to sit out intermittently.

On August 3 at Minnesota, the Metropolitan Stadium scoreboard flashed a message as Demeter walked to the plate saying, "Demeter a Dad." His first daughter had been born that night in Newton-Wellesley Hospital earlier in the day. After the message flashed, the ballplayer launched the first pitch from Twins pitcher Dave Boswell into the left field bleachers for a home run. While Demeter ran around the bases, the organist played the theme, "Rock-a-bye Baby."

Demeter returned to Detroit for a four-game series in early August. On August 6, he hit a home run off former teammate Denny McLain. In seven games against his old team, he recorded two home runs, seven RBI, a .381 batting average and a .762 slugging percentage.

In 73 games with the Red Sox, Demeter batted .292, the highest batting average of players with more than 10 at bats. His .478 slugging percentage was second to Tony Conigliaro, and his .783 OPS ranked just behind Conigliaro (.817) and Carl Yastrzemski (.799). In the 23 games in which he batted fifth in the lineup, he posted a .372 batting average with four home runs, 14 RBI, and a .991 OPS. For the overall season, he hit .268 with 14 home runs and 41 RBI, playing in 105 games.

Coming into the 1967 season, Demeter again found himself faced with competition in center field. Rookie Reggie Smith looked to be the new starting center fielder, with Jose Tartabull to be his backup, leaving Demeter as the odd man out. Talks of trading Demeter surfaced in December, with The Sporting News theorizing that Boston might try to trade him back to Detroit to retrieve Wilson. By the end of spring training, George Thomas had also passed him on the depth chart. In the regular season, Demeter served as a reserve player, not getting a start until May 7, Boston's 20th game of the season. He went 2-for-5 in the game with a double and a run scored, as well as two notedly hard line drive outs. After Demeter's successful first start, manager Dick Williams told the Boston press that he would likely start in right field for Conigliaro, but come the night of May 8, Conigliaro was starting in right and Demeter was once again riding the bench, much to Demeter's reported chagrin. He had only 43 at bats for Boston in 20 games through June 4, batting .279 with one home run. On June 4, the Red Sox traded him and Tony Horton to the Cleveland Indians for pitcher Gary Bell on June 4, 1967.

== Cleveland Indians ==
With Cleveland, Demeter got several starts in centerfield, though he would play each outfield position as well as a game at first base. Against Kansas City on June 19, with two men out in the bottom of the ninth and one man on base, he pinch-hit for pitcher Sonny Siebert, hitting a game-tying home run in an eventual 2–1 victory for Cleveland. He missed several games towards the end of the month with a pulled leg muscle.

On August 31, the Tigers announced that they had purchased Demeter's contract from Cleveland. He was going to be their first baseman, but the deal was called off as it was found out that he had circulatory problems around the heart area. Bothered by chest pains, he underwent several examinations. Doctors originally diagnosed him with a minor muscle strain, but an EKG on September 5 showed "changes which indicate a disturbance in his coronary artery circulation." He did not play again after the transaction fell through.

Demeter played in 51 games for Cleveland, batting .207 with five home runs and 12 RBI. For the 1967 season overall, he appeared in 71 games, hitting six home runs, driving in 16 runners, and batting .226. In August, he batted .313 with six RBI and two home runs over 19 games. In his last appearance of the season, he was used as a pinch-hitter in an 8–7 victory over Kansas City on August 28.

In early January 1968, Demeter was still listed on the Indians roster, but he was heavily considering retirement. On February 29, he officially announced he was finished playing Major League Baseball. He had already reported for spring training in Tucson, Arizona and successfully passed a complete physical examination, but he decided to end his career anyway due to the potential for future heart trouble. Though he had not suffered damage to his heart, Demeter said, "The doctor added that there was the possibility that I'd be running down the line some day and have an attack."

Demeter would play another game in 1971, however, when he participated in the first ever Old-Timer's Game hosted by the Dodgers. He started in center field for the 1960s Dodgers. The 1950s Dodgers won the game 1–0 in front of a crowd of 48,227. In subsequent years, he appeared in other Old-Timer's Games for Los Angeles.

== Legacy and career statistics ==
Demeter's errorless game streak would stand as a record for outfielders for almost 28 years, until on July 16, 1993, Darren Lewis would play in his 267th consecutive error-less game. Following his career, he was inducted into the Oklahoma Sports Hall of Fame. In 1999, he became part of the Brooklyn Dodgers Hall of Fame. Writing for the Society for American Baseball Research in 2007, Jonathan Arnold said Demeter was "a very highly regarded player during his career, [though] he is largely a forgotten man now."

Demeter holds the bizarre distinction of being the only major leaguer on record to field an apple. There was a game during his tenure with the Phillies where Demeter had missed several defensive plays at third base. The fans were upset and booing loudly, even prompting one overzealous fan to throw an apple onto the field. Demeter recalled, "I'd made two errors and here came an apple sailing out of the stands." He continued, "So I just picked it up, took a bite out of it and the booing stopped."

In an 11-season career, Demeter posted a .265 batting average with 163 home runs and 563 RBI in 1109 games played.

| G | AB | R | H | 2B | 3B | HR | RBI | SB | CS | BB | SO | BA | OBP | SLG | TB | SH | SF | HBP | FLD% |
| 1,109 | 3,443 | 467 | 912 | 147 | 17 | 163 | 563 | 22 | 25 | 180 | 658 | .265 | .307 | .459 | 1,582 | 33 | 32 | 42 | .980 |

== Personal life ==
As a junior in high school in 1950, Demeter met his future wife, Betty Jo Madole, at the Exchange Avenue Baptist Church during a social event. They married on May 17, 1957 and had a son, Russell Don Demeter, on January 26, 1959. They had another son, Todd, in 1962, and their daughter Jill was born during Demeter's time with the Red Sox in 1966. Todd was a second round draft pick of the Yankees in 1979. He played four seasons for the Yankees' farm system and two with Cardinals' minor league teams, but he never advanced past Class AA. In 1996, Todd died of Hodgkin's Disease. Two of Don's grandchildren, Cole and Caden Cleveland, were All-State ballplayers at Christian Heritage Academy in Del City, Oklahoma before playing National Collegiate Athletic Association (NCAA) Division 1 college baseball at Morehead State University in Kentucky.

After winning the World Series with the Dodgers in 1959, Demeter returned home to Oklahoma City to spend the winter as a youth director at a Baptist church. In the aftermath of his career-best 1962 season, Demeter toured on an exhibition team put together by Willie Mays, spoke at church functions across five states, and went on a church-sponsored tour of Japan along with Yankees second baseman Bobby Richardson. The tour was sponsored by the Texas Baptist Convention as part of its "New Life Campaign." "We are two Christians from the United States. We are here to present our witness for Christ," Demeter and Richardson described the purpose for their trip. They gave Christian testimonies to locals and spoke to Japanese professional baseball players.

Demeter did not drink, smoke, or curse during his baseball career. He also rejected endorsement deals for advertising alcohol and tobacco products. Mizell, the pitcher who struck him out in his first at bat and a fellow Christian, later became a close friend of his. Demeter was also friends with Washington Senators catcher Mike Brumley, his neighbor in Oklahoma City. Brumley accompanied Demeter to church appearances several nights a week throughout Oklahoma and Texas throughout the years, and the two gave a series of church meetings in Alaska in 1966. Demeter was a member of the Fellowship of Christian Athletes.

Once his baseball career was over, Demeter returned home to Oklahoma to start a swimming pool business. In 1973, he became president of the minor league Oklahoma City 89ers. He entered a political race in 1976 as a Republican, losing a bid for a seat in the Oklahoma House of Representatives. In September 2002, Demeter started Grace Community Baptist Church, a Southern Baptist church in Oklahoma City. He served as the church's pastor for slightly more than 16 years before his grandson, Cole Cleveland, succeeded him. Demeter remained on staff as pastor emeritus until his death. Tom Sturdivant, the former pitcher for the Yankees, was one of the members.

Demeter died on November 29, 2021, at the age of 86.
