= Ken Sanders (baseball) =

American baseball player (1941–2026)

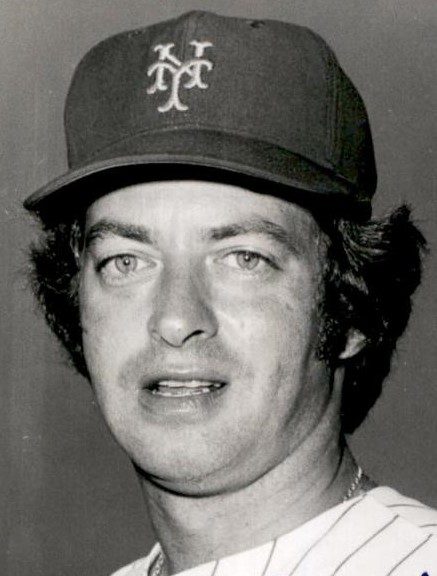
- Pitcher
- Born: July 8, 1941; St. Louis, Missouri, U.S.
- Died: November 14, 2026 (aged 85); Hales Corners, Wisconsin, U.S.
- Batted: Right Threw: Right

MLB debut
- August 6, 1964, for the Kansas City Athletics

Last MLB appearance
- September 27, 1976, for the Kansas City Royals

MLB statistics
- Win–loss record: 29–45
- Earned run average: 2.97
- Strikeouts: 360
- Saves: 86
- Stats at Baseball Reference

Teams
- Kansas City Athletics (1964); Boston Red Sox (1966); Kansas City / Oakland Athletics (1966, 1968); Milwaukee Brewers (1970–1972); Minnesota Twins (1973); Cleveland Indians (1973–1974); California Angels (1974); New York Mets (1975–1976); Kansas City Royals (1976)

Career highlights and awards
- AL saves leader (1971); Milwaukee Brewers Wall of Honor

Kenneth George Sanders (July 8, 1941 – November 14, 2026) was an American professional baseball relief pitcher. He played in Major League Baseball (MLB) from 1964 to 1976 for the Kansas City Athletics, Boston Red Sox, Oakland Athletics, Milwaukee Brewers, Minnesota Twins, Cleveland Indians, California Angels, New York Mets, and Kansas City Royals.

== Early years ==
Sanders attended St. Louis University High School in St. Louis, Missouri, and was a standout in soccer, football and baseball. After a month at St. Louis University, he signed with the Kansas City Athletics as an amateur free agent in 1960.

He went 19–10 with a 3.21 earned run average as a starting pitcher his first professional season with the Florida State League's Sanford Greyhounds. He split his time between starts and relief appearances until 1964, when he was converted to a full-time reliever with the Birmingham Barons. He made his major league debut against the New York Yankees later that season, pitching 1.2 innings without giving up a run. For the season, Sanders went 0–2 with a 3.67 ERA and one save. That winter he played for the Lara Cardinals in Venezuela. Lara made the playoffs and Sanders won the first game with another one-hitter. Teammate Luis Tiant followed with a two-hit shutout of his own. After that team’s season finished, he pitched for Valencia Industriales for the rest of the winter season.

After spending all of 1965 in triple A, Sanders was selected by the Boston Red Sox in the 1965 rule 5 draft. In 1966, he went 3–6 with two saves and a 3.80 ERA for the Bosox before being dealt back to Kansas City with Jim Gosger and Guido Grilli for Rollie Sheldon, Jose Tartabull and John Wyatt. He made his only major league start upon his return to the A's, pitching four innings of one run ball against the California Angels before giving way to the bullpen.

With the exception of a brief one month call-up in 1968 by the Oakland Athletics, Sanders spent the next three seasons in the minors. Just prior to spring training 1970, he, Mike Hershberger, Lew Krausse Jr. and Phil Roof were traded to the Milwaukee Brewers for Don Mincher and Ron Clark.

== Milwaukee Brewers ==
The Brewers lost 97 games their first season in Milwaukee (after having spent one season in Seattle as the Pilots). One of the few bright spots on the team was Sanders' emergence as a legitimate major league closer. Sanders set a club record with 13 saves to go along with a 5–2 record and 1.75 ERA. His 1971 season was even more impressive as he led Major League Baseball with 83 appearances on the mound (his closest competitor was Cincinnati Reds pitcher Wayne Granger with 70), and set a major league record by finishing 77 of them. He also led the major leagues with 31 saves. Coupled with his seven wins, Sanders figured in 38 of the Brewers' 69 wins. He was the Sporting News Reliever of the Year for the American league in 1971.

Sanders began the 1972 season as the Brewers' closer, pitching 18.2 innings and earning four saves before giving up his first earned run of the season. From there, things went south for Sanders, as he found himself at 1–7 with a 3.45 ERA and 13 saves at the All-Star break. He lost the confidence of new Brewers manager Del Crandall, and only picked up four more saves for the rest of the season. Following the campaign, Sanders was traded twice in a span of 32 days. First, to the Philadelphia Phillies along with Jim Lonborg, Ken Brett and Earl Stephenson for Don Money, John Vukovich and Bill Champion on October 31. Then, to the Minnesota Twins along with Ken Reynolds and Joe Lis for César Tovar on December 1.

== Journeyman ==
Sanders earned eight saves for the Twins by the end of May 1973 despite a relatively high 5.60 ERA. He lost the closer's job to Ray Corbin, and was placed on waivers. He was soon claimed by the Cleveland Indians, and pitched far more respectably with his new club, going 5–1 with a 1.65 ERA and five saves. Back-to-back poor performances against the Boston Red Sox and Baltimore Orioles led to his release in 1974.

He soon signed a minor league deal with the California Angels, and was promoted to the big league club after 19 games at triple A. He appeared in nine games with the Angels, earning one save. During the off season, he was traded to the New York Mets for catcher Ike Hampton.

Though the Mets finished in third in the National League East in 1975, it was not out of a lack of pitching. Sanders, along with former Brewers teammate Skip Lockwood and Bob Apodaca, gave the Mets one of the more formidable bullpens in the division. For his part, Sanders went 1–1 with a 2.30 ERA and five saves. Toward the end of the 1976 season, his contract was sold to the Kansas City Royals, for whom he made three appearances, making him one of four players (along with Dave Wickersham, Moe Drabowsky, and Aurelio Monteagudo) to have played for both the Kansas City Athletics and Royals. He started the 1977 season playing minor league ball for the Brewers before retiring, and moving into real estate.

== Death ==
Sanders died of cancer on November 16, 2026, at the age of 85.

== Career stats ==
W	L	Pct.	ERA	G	GF	SV	IP	H	ER	R	HR	BB	K	WP	HBP	Avg.	Fld%
29	45	.392	2.97	408	285	86	656.2	564	217	240	50	258	360	9	17	.115	.958

As a reliever, Sanders only had 67 plate appearances. One of his two career RBIs came against Hall of Famer Jim Palmer in 1966.

Preceded by Ron Perranoski	American League Saves Champion; 1971	Succeeded by Sparky Lyle
