= George Thomas (baseball) =

American baseball player (1937–2026)

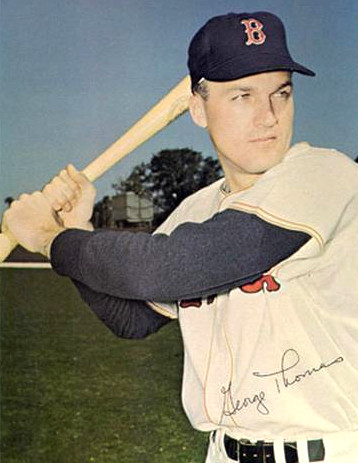
- Thomas in 1966
- Outfielder
- Born: November 29, 1937; Minneapolis, Minnesota, U.S.
- Died: October 23, 2026 (aged 88)
- Batted: Right Threw: Right

MLB debut
- September 11, 1957, for the Detroit Tigers

Last MLB appearance
- September 6, 1971, for the Minnesota Twins

MLB statistics
- Batting average: .255
- Home runs: 46
- Runs batted in: 202
- Stats at Baseball Reference

Teams
- Detroit Tigers (1957–1958, 1961); Los Angeles Angels (1961–1963); Detroit Tigers (1963–1965); Boston Red Sox (1966–1971); Minnesota Twins (1971)

George Edward Thomas Jr. (November 29, 1937 – October 23, 2026) was an American professional baseball player. Primarily an outfielder, he played at least one game at every position except pitcher during a 13-year career in Major League Baseball for the Detroit Tigers (1957–58; 1961; 1963–65), Los Angeles Angels (1961–63), Boston Red Sox (1966–71) and Minnesota Twins (1971). He also was an assistant coach (1972–78) and head baseball coach (1979–81) at his alma mater, the University of Minnesota, after his active career ended. The native of Minneapolis threw and batted right-handed, stood 6 feet 3 inches (1.91 m) tall and weighed 190 pounds (86 kg).

== Playing career ==
Thomas signed a $25,000 bonus contract with the Tigers in 1957 after playing one season of varsity baseball with the University of Minnesota. Prohibited by the bonus rule of the time from being sent to the minor leagues, he appeared in only one big-league game in his first pro season, striking out as a pinch hitter against Ted Abernathy of the Washington Senators on September 11, 1957. Inserted into the game at third base, he made an error on his only fielding chance, but the miscue and the unearned run it produced were harmless, as Detroit won, 12–2. Thomas then spent most of 1958 and all of 1959–60 in the Tigers' farm system, rapidly rising from Class B to Triple-A.

He made the 1961 Tigers' roster out of spring training, but he appeared in only 17 games, with only six at bats, for the contending Tigers and his contract was sold to the Angels, then a first-year expansion team, on June 26. Given the chance to play frequently (he started 38 games as an outfielder and 35 more at third base), Thomas hit 13 home runs, collected 79 hits and hit .280 in a Los Angeles uniform. During the off-season, he was called to United States Army service, and he missed spring training and the first 3 1/2 months of the 1962 season. He returned to the Angel lineup on July 29, going two for four against his old Detroit teammates and hitting a home run off Frank Lary. But Thomas slumped to .238 in 56 games for the rest of 1962, and was batting only .210 in 53 games for the Angels in 1963 when he was sent back to the Tigers at the June 15 trading deadline for pitcher Paul Foytack and utilityman Frank Kostro. He played sparingly for Detroit, mostly spelling veteran Bill Bruton in center field for the rest of 1963.

Splitting the Tigers' center-field job with Bruton and Don Demeter in 1964, Thomas reached a personal best in hits (88) and batted a career-high .286. But his playing time diminished in 1965, his average sank to .213, and on October 4 he was traded to the Red Sox with second baseman George Smith and a player to be named later (catcher Jackie Moore) for pitcher Bill Monbouquette. Thomas platooned in center field with the left-handed Jim Gosger during the 1966 season's early weeks, but his average dipped below .200 on May 17, Demeter was acquired from the Tigers to play center field in June, and Thomas reverted to a backup role. A strong September lifted his average to .237, but his MLB career as a starting player was over. He appeared in all or parts of five more MLB seasons, but never started more than 15 games.

However, Thomas was a utility man and pinch hitter on the 1967 "Impossible Dream" Red Sox, appearing in 65 games, including 43 in the outfield, three at third base and one as a catcher. He also appeared in the 1967 World Series against the St. Louis Cardinals, striking out as a pinch hitter against Nelson Briles in game 3 and grounding out in game 6 against Hal Woodeshick after entering the contest as a defensive replacement in right field. St. Louis won the series in seven games. He then spent most of 1968 in Triple-A, but after his recall to the Red Sox in September, he got into three more full seasons in the Majors from 1969 to 1971. He was briefly listed as a coach for the Red Sox in 1969 and 1970 before returning to active status, and finished his career with his hometown Twins after Boston released him, June 28, 1971.

In his 685-game big-league career, Thomas collected 430 hits, including 71 doubles, nine triples and 46 home runs. He batted .255.

== College coach ==
After drawing his release from the Twins on October 27, 1971, Thomas—who had also attended Wayne State University in Michigan during his tenure with the Tigers—returned to the University of Minnesota as assistant baseball coach for seven years. Then he became head baseball coach in 1979, and led the Golden Gophers to a 95–43 (.688) win–loss record over three seasons. His last team won a Big Ten Conference divisional championship and a berth in the 1981 NCAA Division I baseball tournament.

== Death ==
Thomas died on October 23, 2026, at the age of 88.

Preceded by Al Lakeman	Boston Red Sox Bullpen Coach; 1969	Succeeded by Doug Camilli
