= Hal Woodeshick =

American baseball player (1932–2009)

- Pitcher
- Born: August 24, 1932; Wilkes-Barre, Pennsylvania, U.S.
- Died: June 14, 2009 (aged 76); Houston, Texas, U.S.
- Batted: Right Threw: Left

MLB debut
- September 14, 1956, for the Detroit Tigers

Last MLB appearance
- August 28, 1967, for the St. Louis Cardinals

MLB statistics
- Win–loss record: 44–62
- Earned run average: 3.56
- Strikeouts: 484
- Saves: 61
- Stats at Baseball Reference

Teams
- Detroit Tigers (1956); Cleveland Indians (1958); Washington Senators (1959–1960); Washington Senators (1961); Detroit Tigers (1961); Houston Colt .45s / Astros (1962–1965); St. Louis Cardinals (1965–1967)

Career highlights and awards
- All-Star (1963); World Series champion (1967)

Harold Joseph Woodeshick (August 24, 1932 – June 14, 2009) was an American left-handed pitcher who spent eleven seasons in Major League Baseball (MLB) with the Detroit Tigers (1956 and 1961), Cleveland Indians (1958), the original modern Washington Senators franchise (1959–60), the expansion Washington Senators club (1961), Houston Colt .45s / Astros (1962–65), and St. Louis Cardinals (1965–67). He was the first closer in the history of the Astros' franchise. He was also a member of the Cardinals' 1967 World Series Championship team. He was nicknamed "The Switchman" for his ability to "turn out the lights" on opposing batters.

== Playing career ==
=== Baseball nomad ===
Born on August 24, 1932, in Wilkes-Barre, Pennsylvania, Woodeshick signed with the Philadelphia Phillies as an amateur free agent in 1950. His time with them consisted of only one inning pitched for the Carbondale Pioneers, the Phillies' North Atlantic League team. He split his 1951 campaign with a pair of independent minor league clubs: the Duluth Dukes of the Northern League (three games) and the Youngstown A's of the Middle Atlantic League (two innings). He joined the New York Giants organization in 1952, winning 13 decisions that year with the Kingsport Cherokees of the Appalachian League and 14 in 1955 with the Danville Leafs of the Carolina League. He served in the United States Army during the two years between those seasons.

He was selected by Detroit in the minor league draft on November 27, 1955. A 12-game winner with the Charleston Senators in 1956, he made his major league debut later that year on September 14 in a 5–1 defeat to the eventual World Series Champion New York Yankees at Briggs Stadium. He picked up the loss after surrendering four runs in three innings as the starter. His only other appearance with the Tigers came ten days later on September 24 in another start at home which resulted in him yielding four runs again and earning his second straight loss. This time his outing lasted 2 1/3 innings in the Chicago White Sox's 14–11 triumph. He returned to the minors in 1957, dividing his time between Charleston and the Augusta Tigers.

He was traded with Jay Porter to Cleveland for Hank Aguirre and Jim Hegan on February 18, 1958. Woodeshick split the 1958 campaign between the Indians and its top farm team in San Diego where he won ten contests, and began the next one with the Toronto Maple Leafs. He was dealt to the Washington Senators along with Hal Naragon for Ed Fitz Gerald on May 25, 1959. After that franchise moved west and became the Minnesota Twins, he was picked in the 1960 Major League Baseball expansion draft by the second Washington Senators on December 14, 1960. He returned to the Detroit Tigers just under six months later on June 5, 1961, in exchange for Chuck Cottier. Woodeshick was also loaned to the Charleston (WV) Marlins for part of the 1961 season.

He once reflected on the nomadic nature of the early years of his baseball career, saying, "People talk about pressure now, but pressure was driving a wife and child across the country with no contract, a bad back, and not knowing whether you're going to have a job next year."

=== Houston Colt .45s/Astros ===
Woodeshick was on the Houston Colt .45s roster for the expansion team's inaugural Opening Day in 1962. His contract had been purchased on October 12, 1961, from the Denver Bears, the Tigers' American Association affiliate at the time. General manager Paul Richards, who had previously managed the Baltimore Orioles, was impressed with several of his qualities such as his six-foot-four-inch (1.93 meters) height, work ethic and an ability to throw an effective sinker. The most important one was Woodeshick having his best performances against Richards' old ballclub. In the fifteen games he pitched versus the Orioles, he was 4–1 with a 1.80 earned run average (ERA).

The acquisition was a big risk because Woodeshick was prone to wildness with his pitches and had problems with his fielding. He spent most of his first Colt .45s spring training working with Richards and pitching coach Cot Deal to correct his inability to make accurate throws to the first baseman after cleanly fielding ground balls. The solution was for Woodeshick to jog toward the first baseman and lob an overhand soft toss to him. Under Richards' tutelage, he improved his curveball and learned how to throw the slip pitch.

Woodeshick started in 26 of his 31 appearances in 1962. In the Colt .45s' second-ever regular season contest on April 11, its first at night, he pitched eight innings and endured a one-hour rain delay in the fourth to earn a 2–0 victory over the Chicago Cubs. He finished the campaign with a 5–16 record due to a pair of nagging injuries. A slow-healing throat infection had left him out of playing shape at midseason. By the time he was released at year's end, his back pain was so debilitating that his wife had to drive him back to their Pennsylvania home. After two spinal taps failed to provide a cure, his problem was remedied by a chiropractor who prescribed an exercise regimen.

He returned to the Colt .45s as its first-ever legitimate closer in 1963, winning eleven games with a team-leading ten saves and a 1.97 ERA. His success was based largely on having picked up the slider from Rusty Staub. Woodeshick pitched two scoreless innings in relief of Ray Culp for the National League in the 1963 Major League Baseball All-Star Game, striking out Joe Pepitone in the sixth and Bob Allison and Harmon Killebrew in the seventh. The only two baserunners he allowed were Zoilo Versalles (walk) and Brooks Robinson (single), both in the sixth. His best year in the majors was 1964 when he led the senior circuit in saves with 23.

=== Later career ===
A trade deadline deal on June 15, 1965, sent him, along with Chuck Taylor, to the Cardinals for Mike Cuellar and Ron Taylor. Used exclusively out of the bullpen, Woodeshick led the team in saves with 15 in 1965. He was replaced as the closer by Joe Hoerner the following year. As a member of the 1967 World Series Champions, Woodeshick's only appearance in the Fall Classic was a scoreless bottom half of the eighth inning in relief of Ray Washburn in Game Six. After getting both George Thomas and Joe Foy each to ground out, he surrendered a single to Mike Andrews, who was retired when the next batter, Carl Yastrzemski, hit into a fielder's choice. Woodeshick's professional baseball career ended when he was released by the Cardinals on October 20, 1967, only eight days after The Series concluded.

=== Overview ===
In 11 major league seasons he had a 44–62 win–loss record, 427 games, 62 games started, 7 complete games, 1 shutout, 197 games finished, 61 saves, 847.1 innings pitched, 816 hits allowed, 400 runs allowed (335 earned), 40 home runs allowed, 389 walks allowed (61 intentional), 484 strikeouts, 35 hit batsmen, 55 wild pitches, 3,717 batters faced, 5 balks and a 3.56 ERA.

== Death ==
He died on June 14, 2009, at age 76 after a long illness.

== See also ==
- Houston Astros award winners and league leaders
- List of Major League Baseball annual saves leaders
