= 1967 World Series =

64th edition of Major League Baseball's championship series

Team (Wins)	Managers	Season
St. Louis Cardinals (4)	Red Schoendienst	101–60, .627, GA: 10 1/2
Boston Red Sox (3)	Dick Williams	92–70, .568, GA: 1
- Dates: October 4–12
- Venue(s): Fenway Park (Boston); Busch Memorial Stadium (St. Louis)
- MVP: Bob Gibson (St. Louis)
- Umpires: Johnny Stevens (AL), Al Barlick (NL), Ed Runge (AL), Augie Donatelli (NL), Frank Umont (AL), Paul Pryor (NL)
- Hall of Famers: Umpire: Al Barlick; Cardinals: Red Schoendienst‡ (manager); Lou Brock; Steve Carlton; Orlando Cepeda; Bob Gibson; Red Sox: Dick Williams (manager); Carl Yastrzemski ‡ Elected as a player

Broadcast
- Television: NBC
- TV announcers: Curt Gowdy; Ken Coleman (in Boston); Harry Caray (in St. Louis)
- Radio: NBC
- Radio announcers: Pee Wee Reese; Harry Caray (in Boston); Ken Coleman (in St. Louis); Jim Simpson (Game 7)

The 1967 World Series was the championship series of Major League Baseball's (MLB) 1967 season. The 64th edition of the World Series, it was a best-of-seven playoff between the American League (AL) champion Boston Red Sox and the National League (NL) champion St. Louis Cardinals. In a rematch of the 1946 World Series, the Cardinals won in seven games for their second championship in four years and their eighth overall. The Series was played from October 4 to 12 at Fenway Park and Busch Memorial Stadium. It was the first World Series since 1948 that did not feature the Yankees, Dodgers, or Giants. This was the first World Series where the winning team was presented the Commissioner's Trophy.

As of 2026, this is the last time the Cardinals won the World Series on the road.

== Background ==
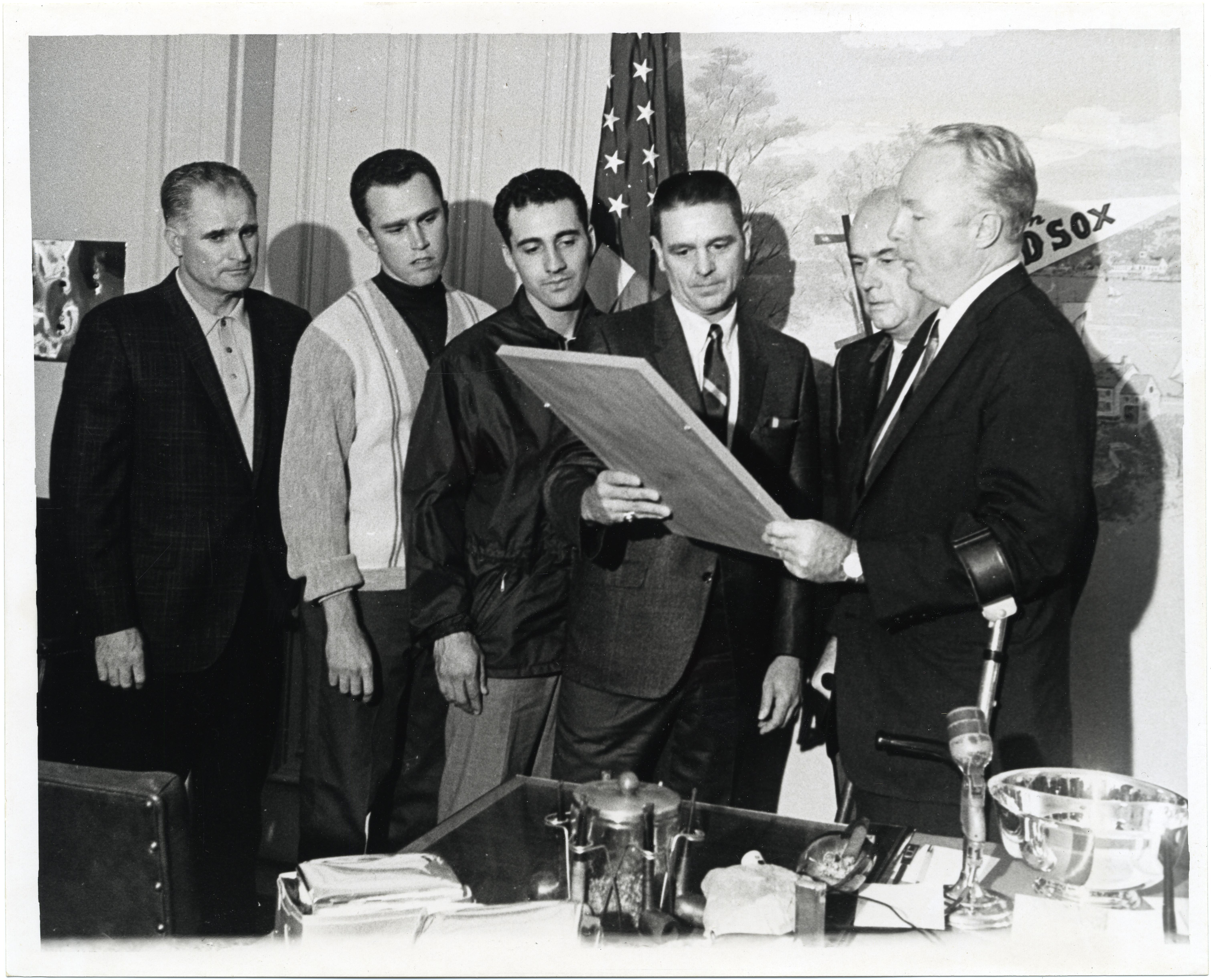
Red Sox personnel with Mayor of Boston John F. Collins (at right) in October 1967. From left: coach Bobby Doerr, infielders Dalton Jones and Rico Petrocelli, manager Dick Williams, and executive Dick O'Connell.

This was the sixth meeting between teams from Boston and St. Louis for a major professional sports championship.

=== Boston Red Sox ===
The "Impossible Dream" Red Sox were led by triple crown winner Carl Yastrzemski (who won the Most Valuable Player award for his 1967 performance) and ace pitcher Jim Lonborg, who won the American League Cy Young Award. The Red Sox reached the World Series by emerging victorious from a dramatic four-team pennant race that revitalized interest in the team after eight straight losing seasons. Going into the last week of the season, the Red Sox, Detroit Tigers, Minnesota Twins, and Chicago White Sox were all within one game of each other in the standings. The White Sox lost their last five games (two to the lowly Kansas City Athletics and three to the similarly inept Washington Senators) to fall out of the race. Meanwhile, the Red Sox and Twins met in Boston for the final two games of the season, with Minnesota—who won the AL Pennant two years earlier—holding a one-game lead. Boston swept the Twins, but needed to wait out the result of the Tigers' doubleheader with the California Angels in Detroit. A Detroit sweep would have enabled them to tie the Red Sox for first place. The Tigers won the first game but the Angels won the nightcap, enabling the Red Sox to claim their first pennant since 1946.

=== St. Louis Cardinals ===
The Cardinals won 101 games en route to the National League pennant, with a team featuring All-Stars Orlando Cepeda (selected as the National League Most Valuable Player), Lou Brock, Tim McCarver, and 1964 World Series MVP Bob Gibson, as well as former two-time American League MVP Roger Maris and Curt Flood. Twenty-two-year-old Steve Carlton won 14 games in his first full major league season, beginning what was to be a lengthy and very successful career. The Cardinals overcame the absence of Bob Gibson, who missed almost one-third of the season with a broken leg on July 15 (on disabled list, July 16 – September 6) suffered when he was struck by a ball hit by Pittsburgh's Roberto Clemente. Gibson still managed to win 13 games, and while he was out, Nelson Briles filled his spot in the rotation brilliantly, winning nine consecutive games as the Cardinals led the N.L. comfortably for most of the season, eventually winning by 10 1/2 games over the San Francisco Giants.

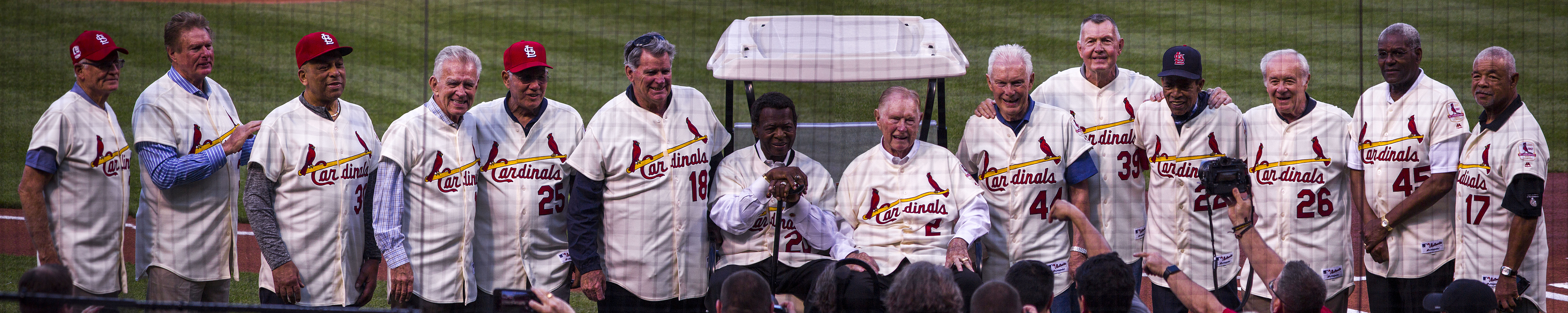
Members of the 1967 Cardinals team in May 2017

== Summary ==
Pitching dominated this World Series, with Bob Gibson leading the Cardinals. Lonborg pitched the decisive final game of the regular season for Boston, so he was unable to start Game 1. Facing José Santiago, Gibson and St. Louis won the Series opener, 2–1. Maris (obtained from the New York Yankees in December 1966) knocked in both of St. Louis' runs with third and seventh-inning grounders. Santiago pitched brilliantly and homered in the third inning off Gibson for the Red Sox' only run.

Gibson cemented his reputation as an unhittable postseason pitcher in this series, allowing only three total runs over three complete games. His efforts allowed the Cardinals to triumph despite the hitting of Yastrzemski (.500 OBP, .840 SLG), and pitching of Lonborg, who allowed only one run total in his complete-game wins in Games 2 and 5. In Game 2, Yastrzemski belted two homers but the story was Lonborg. The Boston ace retired the first 19 Cardinals he faced until he walked Curt Flood with one out in the seventh inning. He had a no-hitter until Julián Javier doubled down the left field line with two out in the eighth. Lonborg settled for a one-hit shutout in which he faced only 29 batters.

In St. Louis, the El Birdos (as Cepeda had nicknamed them) took Games 3 and 4, with Briles pitching the home team to a 5–2 victory (a two-run homer by Mike Shannon proved to be the decisive factor), and Gibson tossing a 6–0 whitewashing (with two RBIs apiece by Maris and McCarver). With the Cardinals leading 3 games to 1, Lonborg kept the Bosox in the series with a 3–1 victory in Game 5. The 25-year-old righthander tossed two-hit shutout ball over 8 2/3 innings, then finally gave up a run when Maris homered to right.

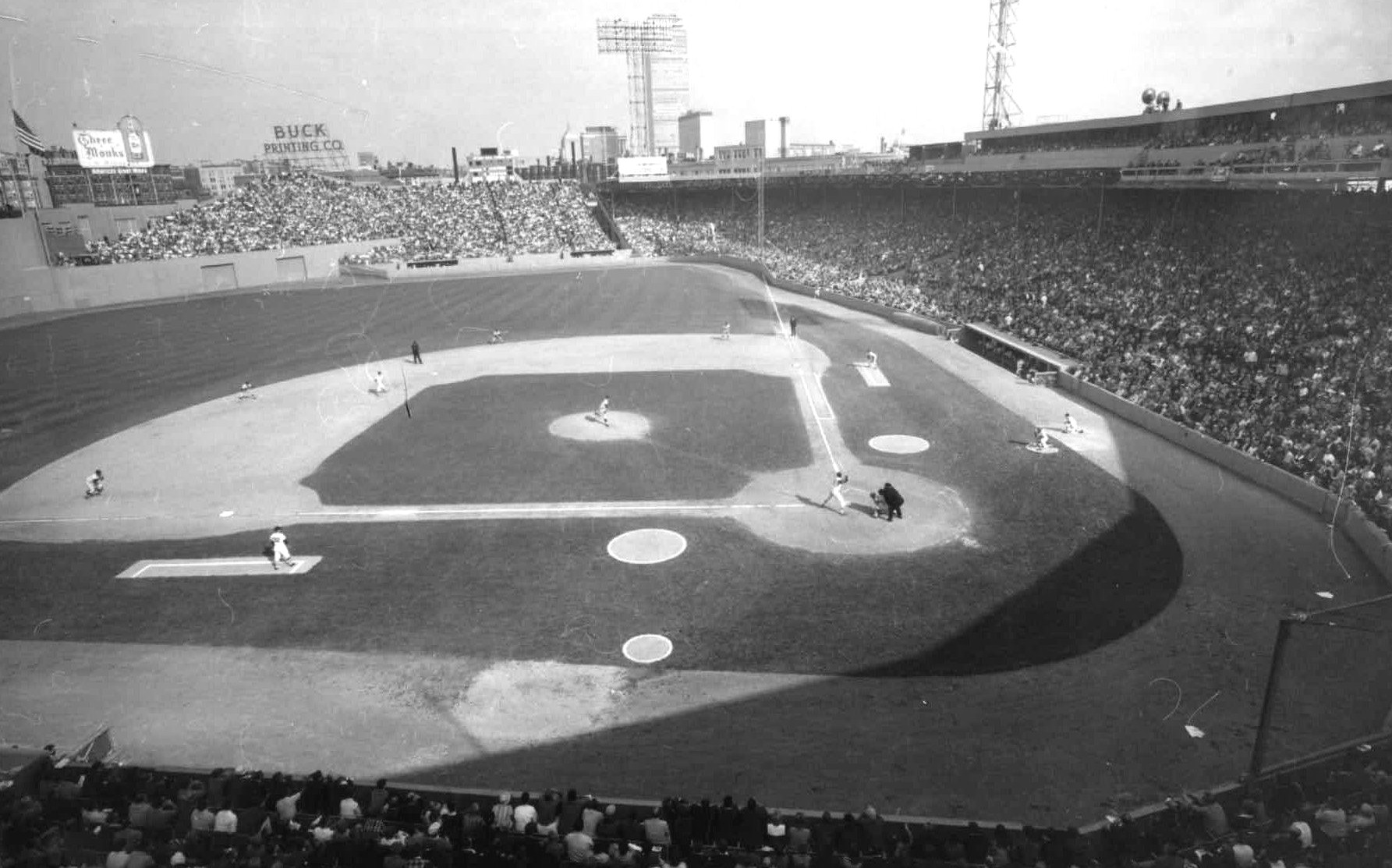
Fenway Park during the World Series

Going for the clincher at Fenway Park in Game 6, the visiting team took a 2–1 lead going into the fourth inning when Dick Hughes (who led the National League with a .727 winning percentage and won 16 games during the regular season) gave up a record three homers in a single inning. Yastrzemski led off the inning with a long drive over the wall in left center and, two outs later, rookie Reggie Smith and Rico Petrocelli hammered consecutive shots. Brock tied the game with a two-run homer in the seventh, but Boston responded with four runs of their own in the bottom of that inning and went on for the 8–4 triumph to tie the series at three games all. The Cardinals set a World Series record using eight pitchers.

The decisive Game 7 featured Gibson and Lonborg facing each other for the first time in the series, but Lonborg was starting on only two days' rest and was unable to compete with Gibson, who allowed only three hits over the course of a complete game. Going into Game 7, both pitchers were 2–0 in the series with Gibson giving up four hits in 18 innings and Lonborg surrendering a single run and four hits in his 18. Something had to give—and it was Lonborg. The Cardinal ace clearly dominated the finale, allowing only three hits, striking out 10 batters and even adding a home run blast of his own in the fifth. Javier added a three-run shot off Lonborg in the sixth and Gibson cruised to the decisive 7–2 victory. He now boasted a 5–1 record and a 2.00 ERA in two World Series, with 57 strikeouts in 54 innings and only 37 hits allowed.

NL St. Louis Cardinals (4) vs. AL Boston Red Sox (3)

Game	Date	Score	Location	Time	Attendance
1	October 4	St. Louis Cardinals – 2, Boston Red Sox – 1	Fenway Park	2:22	34,796
2	October 5	St. Louis Cardinals – 0, Boston Red Sox – 5	Fenway Park	2:24	35,188
3	October 7	Boston Red Sox – 2, St. Louis Cardinals – 5	Busch Memorial Stadium	2:15	54,575
4	October 8	Boston Red Sox – 0, St. Louis Cardinals – 6	Busch Memorial Stadium	2:05	54,575
5	October 9	Boston Red Sox – 3, St. Louis Cardinals – 1	Busch Memorial Stadium	2:20	54,575
6	October 11	St. Louis Cardinals – 4, Boston Red Sox – 8	Fenway Park	2:48	35,188
7	October 12	St. Louis Cardinals – 7, Boston Red Sox – 2	Fenway Park	2:23	35,188

== Matchups ==
=== Game 1 ===
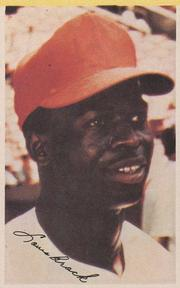
Lou Brock

Wednesday, October 4, 1967 1:00 pm (ET) at Fenway Park in Boston, Massachusetts
Team	1	2	3	4	5	6	7	8	9	R	H	E
St. Louis	0	0	1	0	0	0	1	0	0	2	10	0
Boston	0	0	1	0	0	0	0	0	0	1	6	0
WP: Bob Gibson (1–0) LP: José Santiago (0–1); Home runs: STL: None; BOS: José Santiago (1); Boxscore

In attendance for the opening match-up were Senators Robert F. Kennedy and Ted Kennedy, both Massachusetts natives and supporters of the Red Sox.

Ace Bob Gibson (13–7, 2.98), who sat out July and August with a broken leg, started Game 1 for the Cardinals while 21-year-old José Santiago (12–4, 3.59) started for the Red Sox. Santiago, starting because Sox ace Jim Lonborg had pitched the final day of the regular season, won seven straight second-half games helping Boston stave off the Detroit Tigers and Minnesota Twins to win the pennant by one game in a tightly fought race.

Pitching was prime as Gibson and Santiago seemed to have their best stuff for this afternoon game at Fenway. The Cards got on the board in the top of the third on a leadoff single to center by Lou Brock, a double by Curt Flood, and a Roger Maris groundout to first scoring Brock from third. The Sox came right back to tie the score in the bottom of the same inning. After Bob Gibson struck out Red Sox catcher Russ Gibson, Santiago helped his own cause by homering to left center field.

However, Bob Gibson was masterful the rest of the way finishing with ten strikeouts, allowing just six hits with one walk. Santiago matched Gibson until the top of the seventh when Brock again led off with a single to right (his fourth hit), promptly stole second base, and eventually scored on back-to-back groundouts by Flood and Maris. That run would hold up for a 2–1 Cardinal win, but Lonborg was waiting in the wings to start Game 2.

=== Game 2 ===
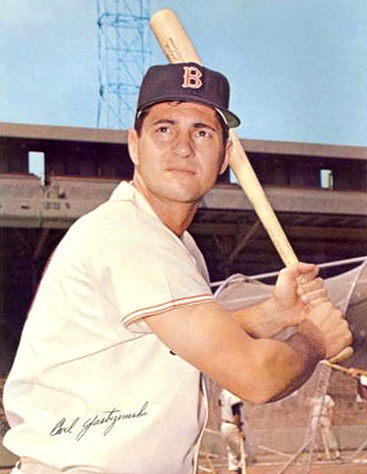
Carl Yastrzemski

Thursday, October 5, 1967 1:00 pm (ET) at Fenway Park in Boston, Massachusetts
Team	1	2	3	4	5	6	7	8	9	R	H	E
St. Louis	0	0	0	0	0	0	0	0	0	0	1	1
Boston	0	0	0	1	0	1	3	0	X	5	9	0
WP: Jim Lonborg (1–0) LP: Dick Hughes (0–1); Home runs: STL: None; BOS: Carl Yastrzemski 2 (2); Boxscore

Jim Lonborg enjoyed his best season as a professional in 1967 capturing the Cy Young Award with an A.L. best 22 wins (against nine losses), was tops with 246 strikeouts, and had an impressive earned run average of 3.16. Lonborg continued his superb pitching starting Game 2 for the Red Sox and for 7 2/3 innings, the Cardinals could only manage one baserunner, a seventh inning walk by Curt Flood. After Tim McCarver and Mike Shannon led off the eighth with groundouts, Julián Javier turned a Lonborg fastball around, lining a double into the left-field corner breaking up his no-hitter. Bobby Tolan, pinch-hitting for weak-hitting Dal Maxvill, ended the inning by grounding out to second-base. Lonborg retired the side in order in the ninth ending the game as close to perfect, giving up just one hit and one walk while striking out four.

Carl Yastrzemski provided more than enough offense by homering in the fourth and adding a three-run shot in the seventh (scoring Jose Tartabull and Dalton Jones.) The other Red Sox run came in the sixth inning on walks to George Scott and Reggie Smith and a sacrifice-fly by shortstop Rico Petrocelli. The final score was 5–0 to even up the series at one game apiece with an upcoming journey to St. Louis for Game 3.

=== Game 3 ===
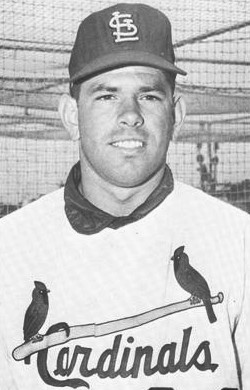
Nelson Briles

Saturday, October 7, 1967 1:00 pm (CT) at Busch Memorial Stadium in St. Louis, Missouri
Team	1	2	3	4	5	6	7	8	9	R	H	E
Boston	0	0	0	0	0	1	1	0	0	2	7	1
St. Louis	1	2	0	0	0	1	0	1	X	5	10	0
WP: Nelson Briles (1–0) LP: Gary Bell (0–1); Home runs: BOS: Reggie Smith (1); STL: Mike Shannon (1); Boxscore

After "Sleepwalking in Boston", the St. Louis Cardinals came out of their hitting slumber and tagged Boston starter Gary Bell for three runs on five hits in the first two innings of Game 3. A former 16-game winner for the Cleveland Indians, Bell was an early-season pickup who pitched well in 29 games for the Sox going 12–8 with an ERA of 3.16. But he didn't have his best stuff against the Cardinals' starter, 23-year-old Nelson Briles. Briles, after losing 15 games in 1966, alternated between middle-relief and starting pitching in '67, and finished with a neat 14-win, five-loss record (.737 winning percentage—best in the N.L.) and an even neater 2.43 ERA.

The great table-setter Lou Brock started things rolling in the first with a triple to left-center. Curt Flood followed with a single to center scoring Brock for the game's first run. In the second, Tim McCarver led off with a single to center followed by a Mike Shannon home run to left. Ineffective Gary Bell was pinch-hit for in the third inning, replaced by Gary Waslewski. Waslewski pitched three perfect innings, striking out three before leaving in the sixth for relief pitcher Lee Stange.

Boston scored their first run in the sixth with Mike Andrews, (pinch-hitting for Bell), singling to center. Andrews took second on a Tartabull sacrifice, immediately scoring on a Dalton Jones base hit to right. But the Cards added some insurance in the bottom of the frame with the disconcerting Brock bunting for a hit, eventually going to third when Stange, attempting a pick-off, threw wild into right-field. Roger Maris, in his next-to-last season, would have a good Series with ten hits and a home run, scored Brock with a single to right-center.

In the seventh Reggie Smith hit a lead-off home run for Boston, trimming the score to 4–2 but the Cards stifled any further Sox comeback scoring their fifth run in the bottom of the eighth when Maris beat out an infield tap for a single and Orlando Cepeda muscled a double off the wall in right-center making the score 5–2. Briles would finish his complete-game victory with a 1–2–3 ninth, the second out recorded when Reggie Smith would interfere with McCarver who was trying to catch his pop-up foul down the first-base line. Up two games to one, St. Louis would send Bob Gibson back to the mound, a championship within reach.

=== Game 4 ===
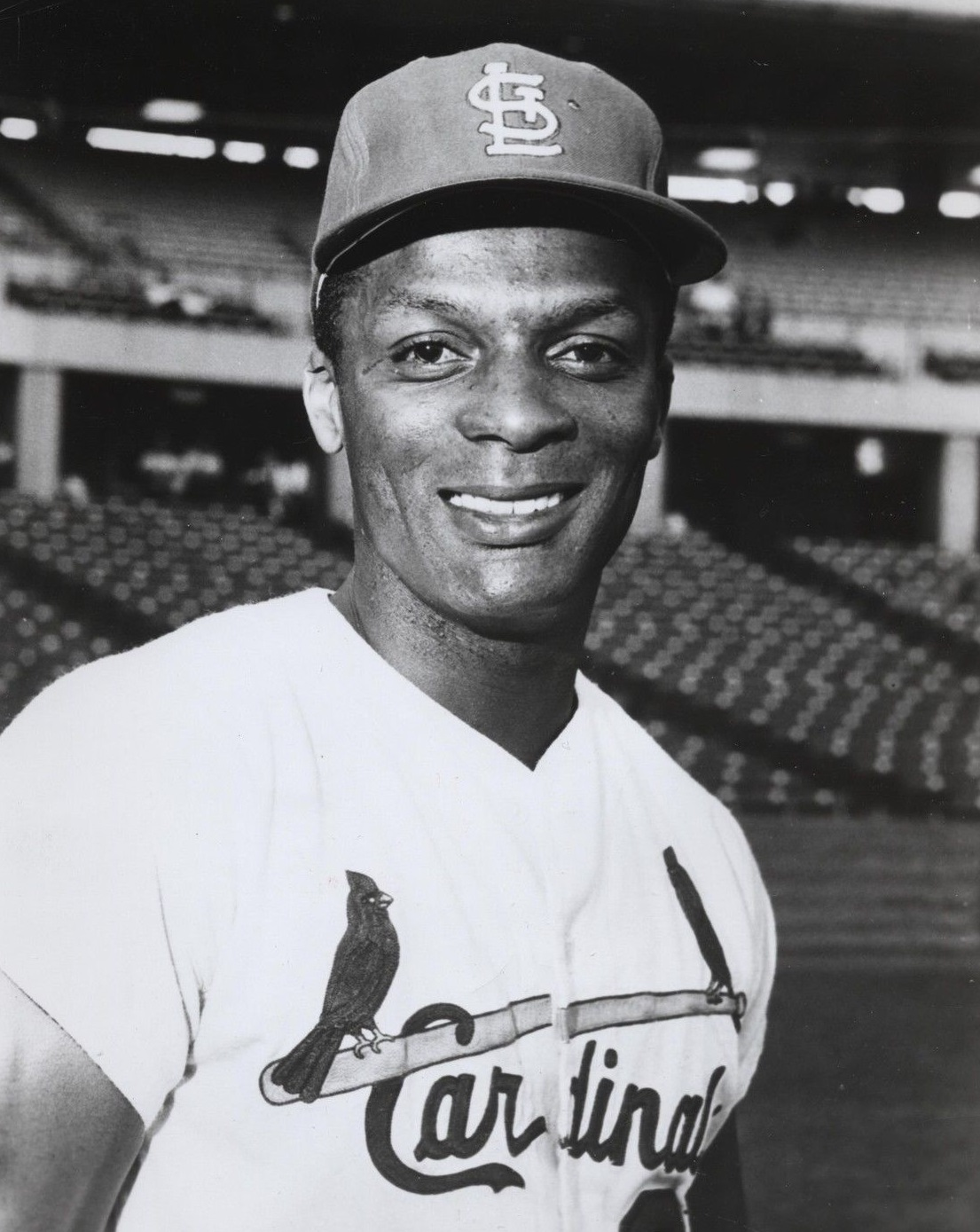
Curt Flood

Sunday, October 8, 1967 1:00 pm (CT) at Busch Memorial Stadium in St. Louis, Missouri
Team	1	2	3	4	5	6	7	8	9	R	H	E
Boston	0	0	0	0	0	0	0	0	0	0	5	0
St. Louis	4	0	2	0	0	0	0	0	X	6	9	0
WP: Bob Gibson (2–0) LP: José Santiago (0–2); Boxscore

54,000 plus fans packed Busch Memorial Stadium in anticipation of yet another Bob Gibson post-season, pitching gem. Again, all St. Louis needed was a spark from Lou Brock and this time four runs crossed the plate in the first inning. Brock started things rolling with a slow-roller to third—nothing Dalton Jones could do could match Brock's speed, for an infield-hit. Curt Flood singled to shallow left and Roger Maris powered-up going the other way, doubling into the left-field corner scoring both base-runners. Orlando Cepeda then flied out, Maris advancing to third. Tim McCarver hit a clutch single to right to score Maris. After Mike Shannon fouled out to Rico Petrocelli for the second out, Julián Javier would single in the hole between short and third followed by .217 lifetime hitter Dal Maxvill's run-scoring single to left for the Cardinals' fourth run. That would be it for Game 1 starter José Santiago who would only last two-thirds of an inning this time out. Gary Bell would relieve, getting the ninth batter of the inning, Bob Gibson to fly out to left.

Gibson would be on cruise-control the remainder of the game while the Cards would add two more runs off reliever Jerry Stephenson in the third. Cepeda would double into the left-field corner and move to third on a wild pitch. McCarver would add a second RBI on a sac-fly to center scoring Cepeda. Shannon would walk and score on a Julián Javier double just inside the third-base line. That would be it for the scoring as Gibson would win his second Series game, a five-hit complete-game that put his Cardinals up, three games to one.

=== Game 5 ===
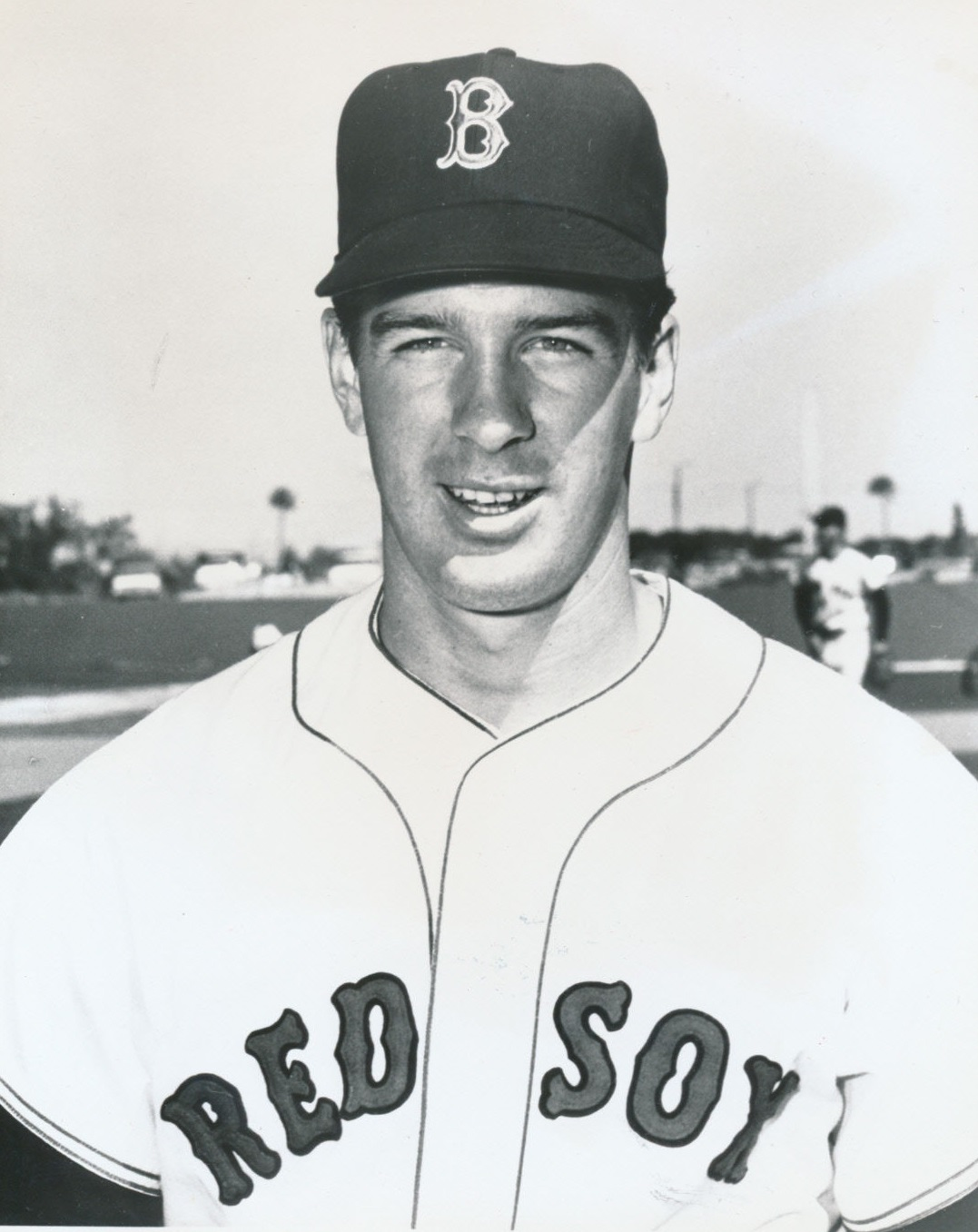
Jim Lonborg

Monday, October 9, 1967 1:00 pm (CT) at Busch Memorial Stadium in St. Louis, Missouri
Team	1	2	3	4	5	6	7	8	9	R	H	E
Boston	0	0	1	0	0	0	0	0	2	3	6	1
St. Louis	0	0	0	0	0	0	0	0	1	1	3	2
WP: Jim Lonborg (2–0) LP: Steve Carlton (0–1); Home runs: BOS: None; STL: Roger Maris (1); Boxscore

With their backs up against the wall, manager Dick Williams again put his trust in the dependable Jim Lonborg. The 25-year-old righty was faced by Steve "Lefty" Carlton. Carlton was 14–9 in 30 games with a 2.98 ERA, striking out 168 in 193 innings during the regular season.

The game played out very tentatively, with just one early run scored by Boston in the top of the third. After Lonborg struck out leading off the inning, Joe Foy struck a single to left field. Mike Andrews reached safely at first after a sacrifice attempt was fumbled by Cardinal third-baseman Mike Shannon for an error. With two on and one out, team hero Carl Yastrzemski looked at a third strike for the second out, but Ken Harrelson followed with a clutch single to left, scoring Foy. This would be enough to saddle Carlton with the loss.

Pitching with a slight cold (and a paper horseshoe in his back pocket) Lonborg again sparkled, at one point retiring 12 straight. After a Roger Maris single in the fourth, the next batter to reach base was Julián Javier, who got on base in the eighth on an error by Rico Petrocelli. Carlton was just as good but left after six innings of work and would take the loss despite having no earned runs (the run in the third was unearned). He was replaced by Ray Washburn, who then pitched two scoreless innings.

St. Louis Manager Red Schoendienst brought in Ron Willis to pitch the ninth. The Red Sox greeted Willis by loading the bases on a George Scott walk, a Reggie Smith double, and an intentional walk to Petrocelli. Jack Lamabe relieved Willis after a 1–0 count on Elston Howard who promptly popped a single to right scoring Scott. Maris threw high to the plate, allowing Smith to score the second run. With the score 3–0, St. Louis came to bat in the last of the ninth in a last attempt comeback bid. But Lonborg's luck continued, getting Brock and Flood to ground out to second and third respectively. Maris spoiled the shutout bid by homering over the right-field fence but Orlando Cepeda ended the game on a ground-out to third. The Red Sox were now back in the Series, although still down three games to two.

=== Game 6 ===
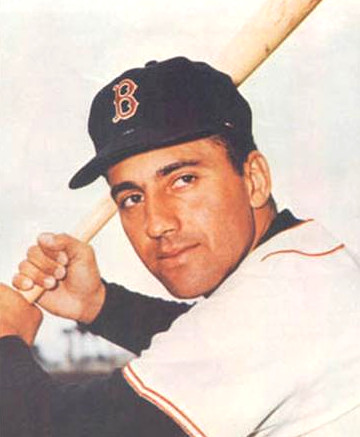
Rico Petrocelli

Wednesday, October 11, 1967 1:00 pm (ET) at Fenway Park in Boston, Massachusetts
Team	1	2	3	4	5	6	7	8	9	R	H	E
St. Louis	0	0	2	0	0	0	2	0	0	4	8	0
Boston	0	1	0	3	0	0	4	0	X	8	12	1
WP: John Wyatt (1–0) LP: Jack Lamabe (0–1) Sv: Gary Bell (1); Home runs: STL: Lou Brock (1); BOS: Rico Petrocelli 2 (2), Carl Yastrzemski (3), Reggie Smith (2); Boxscore

Pivotal Game 6 matched rookie Gary Waslewski (2–2, 3.21) who had only pitched in 12 regular season games, versus one-year wonder Dick Hughes (16–6, 2.67) who pitched three seasons, winning only twice more in 1968 before retiring due to arm problems.

Rico Petrocelli gave the Red Sox an early lead with a second inning blast over the Green Monster in left field. St. Louis came back with two runs in the top of the third when Julián Javier hit a lead-off double off that same Green Monster. After retiring the next two batters, Waslewski gave up a single to Lou Brock, scoring Javier. Then after a Brock steal, Curt Flood singled to left, scoring Brock.

In the Sox half of the fourth, Carl Yastrzemski, Reggie Smith, and Rico Petrocelli would all go deep setting a new World Series record with three home runs in the same inning. A demoralized Hughes wouldn't finish the inning and Ron Willis would be summoned from the bullpen to get the last out, an Elston Howard groundout to third.

Waslewski was very workmanlike, but started to tire in the sixth inning when, after giving up two walks, was replaced by John Wyatt who would get out of the jam retiring Mike Shannon on a popup to short and Javier on a fly to short right. The Cards would come back and hit Wyatt hard in the seventh. After pinch-hitter Bobby Tolan walked, Lou Brock hit a homer into the right-center field bleachers. Flood and Maris hit long fly-outs to center but their hits stayed in the park to end the inning, St. Louis had tied the score at four apiece.

The Red Sox would send ten batters to the plate in the bottom of the seventh inning and regain the lead. Elston Howard would lead off making both the first and last outs but four runs would cross the plate in-between. After all was said and done, the Cardinals would send four pitchers to the mound in the inning and when Hal Woodeshick would come into pitch the eighth, a Series record would be tied with eight (8) pitchers used also setting a two team record of 11 pitchers used. St. Louis had one more good chance to win the game loading the bases in the eighth, but highlighted by a great Yastrzemski catch in left-center, the Cards couldn't push one across and wouldn't score again going quietly in the ninth; with Gary Bell pitching the last two innings for the save. The Red Sox survived to play another day and the Series was now tied at three games apiece. Wyatt took the win and Jack Lamabe, who was the first pitcher for the Cardinals in the eighth, would be given the loss.

=== Game 7 ===
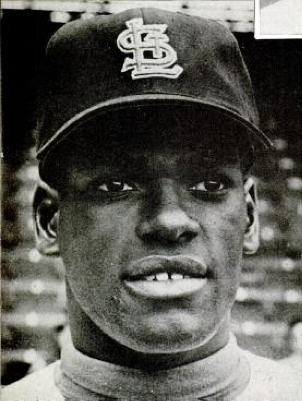
Bob Gibson

Thursday, October 12, 1967 1:00 pm (ET) at Fenway Park in Boston, Massachusetts
Team	1	2	3	4	5	6	7	8	9	R	H	E
St. Louis	0	0	2	0	2	3	0	0	0	7	10	1
Boston	0	0	0	0	1	0	0	1	0	2	3	1
WP: Bob Gibson (3–0) LP: Jim Lonborg (2–1); Home runs: STL: Bob Gibson (1), Julián Javier (1); BOS: None; Boxscore

The seventh game finally matched up the aces, Bob Gibson against Jim Lonborg. Lonborg was pitching on two-days rest, while Gibson had rested an extra day since his last outing. Only once before had a seventh game of a Series brought together starting pitchers who both had 2–0 records in the Series—in 1925, when the Washington Senators' Walter Johnson pitched against the Pittsburgh Pirates' Vic Aldridge. The Cardinals players were angered by the quip "Lonborg and Champagne" which was Dick Williams' response when asked after Game 6 who was to be the Red Sox starting pitcher for the Series-deciding contest and the headline dominating the front page of Boston's Record American the morning of Game 7.

From the start, it was apparent that Lonborg was struggling. Three Cardinal hits and a wild pitch put St. Louis ahead 2–0 in the third inning. Two more scored in the fifth on a home run by Gibson, Lou Brock's single and two stolen bases (his seventh steal—a new Series record), and a Roger Maris sacrifice-fly to right. A Boston run in the fifth cut the score to 4–1, but the Red Sox dream was abruptly halted in the sixth on a three-run homer by Julián Javier off the arm-weary Lonborg to end his night in the sixth inning. Gibson allowed only one other Boston run for another complete game, striking out 10. With the 7–2 defeat, Boston's "Impossible Dream" ended one win short, and the St. Louis Cardinals were World Series Champions for the second time in the 1960s, and eighth overall.

== Composite box ==
1967 World Series (4–3): St. Louis Cardinals (N.L.) over Boston Red Sox (A.L.)

Team	1	2	3	4	5	6	7	8	9	R	H	E
St. Louis Cardinals	5	2	7	0	2	4	3	1	1	25	51	4
Boston Red Sox	0	1	2	4	1	2	8	1	2	21	48	4
Total attendance: 304,085 Average attendance: 43,441; Winning player's share: $8,315 Losing player's share: $5,115

=== Records and notables ===
- This series marked the first time that the Commissioner's Trophy was presented to the World Series-winning team.
- Lou Brock stole three bases in Game 7 for a record seven thefts in a seven-game series, surpassing the mark set by Honus Wagner in 1909.
- The Cardinals tied a World Series record by using eight pitchers in their Game 6 loss.
- Ken Brett, the older brother of George Brett, became the youngest pitcher in World Series history. Aged 19 years, 20 days, when he pitched one inning of relief at the end of Game 4. He also pitched 1/3 of an inning at the end of Game 7. He gave up no hits or runs in either appearance. He was the only left-hander on the Boston pitching staff.
- Bob Gibson gave up only 14 hits in his three complete games, tying Christy Mathewson's record for fewest hits given up in winning three complete World Series games.
- The Cardinals became just the fourth team to play a Game 7 after having a 3–1 World Series lead and just the second to win after the Boston Red Sox in the 1912 World Series. The next team to play a Game 7 after having a 3-1 series lead would be the Cardinals the following year, which they lost. Since 1967, only the Oakland Athletics in the 1972 World Series has managed to win Game 7 after having a 3-1 series lead.

== Series statistics ==
=== Boston Red Sox ===
==== Batting ====
Note: GP=Games played; AB=At bats; R=Runs; H=Hits; 2B=Doubles; 3B=Triples; HR=Home runs; RBI=Runs batted in; BB=Walks; AVG=Batting average; OBP=On base percentage; SLG=Slugging percentage

Player	GP	AB	R	H	2B	3B	HR	RBI	BB	AVG	OBP	SLG	Reference
Elston Howard	7	18	0	2	0	0	0	1	1	.111	.158	.111	
George Scott	7	26	3	6	1	1	0	0	3	.231	.310	.346	
Jerry Adair	5	16	0	2	0	0	0	1	0	.125	.118	.125	
Dalton Jones	6	18	2	7	0	0	0	1	1	.389	.421	.389	
Rico Petrocelli	7	20	3	4	1	0	2	3	3	.200	.292	.550	
Carl Yastrzemski	7	25	4	10	2	0	3	5	4	.400	.500	.840	
Reggie Smith	7	24	3	6	1	0	2	3	2	.250	.308	.542	
José Tartabull	7	13	1	2	0	0	0	0	1	.154	.214	.154	
Joe Foy	6	15	2	2	1	0	0	1	1	.133	.188	.200	
Mike Andrews	5	13	2	4	0	0	0	1	0	.308	.308	.308	
Ken Harrelson	4	13	0	1	0	0	0	1	1	.077	.143	.077	
Norm Siebern	3	3	0	1	0	0	0	1	0	.333	.333	.333	
Russ Gibson	2	2	0	0	0	0	0	0	0	.000	.000	.000	
Mike Ryan	1	2	0	0	0	0	0	0	0	.000	.000	.000	
George Thomas	2	2	0	0	0	0	0	0	0	.000	.000	.000	
Jim Lonborg	3	9	0	0	0	0	0	0	0	.000	.000	.000	
José Santiago	3	2	1	1	0	0	1	1	0	.500	.500	2.000	
Gary Waslewski	2	1	0	0	0	0	0	0	0	.000	.500	.000	

==== Pitching ====
Note: G=Games Played; GS=Games Started; IP=Innings Pitched; H=Hits; BB=Walks; R=Runs; ER=Earned Runs; SO=Strikeouts; W=Wins; L=Losses; SV=Saves; ERA=Earned Run Average

Player	G	GS	IP	H	BB	R	ER	SO	W	L	SV	ERA	Reference
Jim Lonborg	3	3	24	14	2	8	7	11	2	1	0	2.62	
José Santiago	3	2	9 2/3	16	3	6	6	6	0	2	0	5.59	
Gary Waslewski	2	1	8 1/3	4	2	2	2	7	0	0	0	2.16	
Gary Bell	3	1	5 1/3	8	1	3	3	1	0	1	1	5.06	
John Wyatt	2	0	3 2/3	1	3	2	2	1	1	0	0	4.91	
Dave Morehead	2	0	3 1/3	0	4	0	0	3	0	0	0	0.00	
Lee Stange	1	0	2	3	0	1	0	0	0	0	0	0.00	
Jerry Stephenson	1	0	2	3	1	2	2	0	0	0	0	9.00	
Ken Brett	2	0	1 1/3	0	1	0	0	1	0	0	0	0.00	
Dan Osinski	2	0	1 1/3	2	0	1	1	0	0	0	0	6.75	

=== St. Louis Cardinals ===
==== Batting ====
Note: GP=Games played; AB=At bats; R=Runs; H=Hits; 2B=Doubles; 3B=Triples; HR=Home runs; RBI=Runs batted in; BB=Walks; AVG=Batting average; OBP=On base percentage; SLG=Slugging percentage

Player	GP	AB	R	H	2B	3B	HR	RBI	BB	AVG	OBP	SLG	Reference
Tim McCarver	7	24	3	3	1	0	0	2	2	.125	.185	.167	
Orlando Cepeda	7	29	1	3	2	0	0	1	0	.103	.103	.172	
Julián Javier	7	25	2	9	3	0	1	4	0	.360	.360	.600	
Mike Shannon	7	24	3	5	1	0	1	2	1	.208	.240	.375	
Dal Maxvill	7	19	1	3	0	1	0	1	4	.158	.304	.263	
Lou Brock	7	29	8	12	2	1	1	3	2	.414	.452	.655	
Curt Flood	7	28	2	5	1	0	0	3	3	.179	.258	.214	
Roger Maris	7	26	3	10	1	0	1	7	3	.385	.433	.538	
Dave Ricketts	3	3	0	0	0	0	0	0	0	.000	.000	.000	
Bobby Tolan	3	2	1	0	0	0	0	0	1	.000	.333	.000	
Phil Gagliano	1	1	0	0	0	0	0	0	0	.000	.000	.000	
Ed Spiezio	1	1	0	0	0	0	0	0	0	.000	.000	.000	
Bob Gibson	3	11	1	1	0	0	1	1	1	.091	.167	.364	
Nelson Briles	2	3	0	0	0	0	0	0	0	.000	.000	.000	
Dick Hughes	2	3	0	0	0	0	0	0	0	.000	.000	.000	
Steve Carlton	1	1	0	0	0	0	0	0	0	.000	.000	.000	

==== Pitching ====
Note: G=Games Played; GS=Games Started; IP=Innings Pitched; H=Hits; BB=Walks; R=Runs; ER=Earned Runs; SO=Strikeouts; W=Wins; L=Losses; SV=Saves; ERA=Earned Run Average

Player	G	GS	IP	H	BB	R	ER	SO	W	L	SV	ERA	Reference
Bob Gibson	3	3	27	14	5	3	3	26	3	0	0	1.00	
Nelson Briles	2	1	11	7	1	2	2	4	1	0	0	1.64	
Dick Hughes	2	2	9	9	3	6	5	7	0	1	0	5.00	
Steve Carlton	1	1	6	3	2	1	0	5	0	1	0	0.00	
Jack Lamabe	3	0	2 2/3	5	0	2	2	4	0	1	0	6.75	
Ray Washburn	2	0	2 1/3	1	1	0	0	2	0	0	0	0.00	
Ron Willis	3	0	1	2	4	4	3	1	0	0	0	27.00	
Hal Woodeshick	1	0	1	1	0	0	0	0	0	0	0	0.00	
Joe Hoerner	2	0	0 2/3	4	1	3	3	0	0	0	0	40.50	
Larry Jaster	1	0	0 1/3	2	0	0	0	0	0	0	0	0.00	

== Aftermath ==
The 1967 World Series was the first non-exhibition meeting between Major League Baseball teams from St. Louis and Boston since the departures of the Boston Braves and St. Louis Browns following (respectively) the 1952 and 1953 seasons ended regular season meetings between teams from those cities (Braves vs Cardinals, Browns vs Red Sox). It also marked the last time that a St. Louis-based team defeated a Boston-based team in the championship round of any professional sport until 2019 when the St. Louis Blues defeated the Boston Bruins in the 2019 Stanley Cup Final.

This was the Cardinals' first World Series that was not played in Sportsman's Park, which had closed partway through the 1966 season. It was the first of six played in Busch Memorial Stadium, also known as Busch Stadium II, which opened in 1966 to replace Sportsman's Park (which had been renamed Busch Stadium in 1953).

The Cardinals returned to the World Series the next year, where they blew a 3–1 series lead and lost to the Detroit Tigers in seven games after being nine outs away from repeating as champions in Game 5. The Cardinals would win their next championship in 1982 over the Milwaukee Brewers in seven games after being eleven outs away from elimination in Game 7.

The Red Sox would return to the World Series in 1975, but they lost to the Cincinnati Reds in seven games after being seven outs away from the championship in Game 7. They also returned to the World Series in 1986, but lost to the New York Mets, also in seven games after being a strike away from the championship twice in Game 6 and ten outs away from the championship in Game 7.

The Red Sox and Cardinals would meet again in the 2004 World Series, where the Red Sox swept the Cardinals to break the Curse of the Bambino. The Red Sox bested them again in six games nine years later.

== See also ==
- 1967 Japan Series
- Curse of the Bambino
- Cardinals–Red Sox rivalry

== Sources ==
- Cohen, Richard M.; Neft, David S. (1990). The World Series: Complete Play-By-Play of Every Game, 1903–1989. New York: St. Martin's Press. ISBN 0-312-03960-3.
- Reichler, Joseph (1982). The Baseball Encyclopedia (5th ed.). Macmillan Publishing. p. 2175. ISBN 0-02-579010-2.
- Forman, Sean L. "1967 World Series". Baseball-Reference.com – Major League Statistics and Information. Archived from the original on November 26, 2007.
