= José Tartabull =

Cuban baseball player (born 1938)

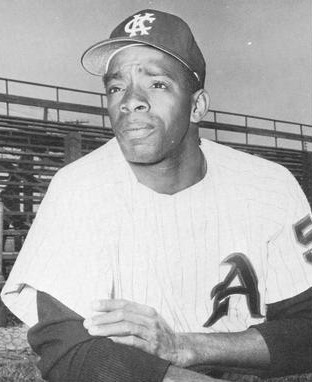
- Tartabull in 1963
- Outfielder
- Born: November 27, 1938 (age 87); Cienfuegos, Cuba
- Batted: Left Threw: Left

MLB debut
- April 10, 1962, for the Kansas City Athletics

Last MLB appearance
- July 7, 1970, for the Oakland Athletics

MLB statistics
- Batting average: .261
- Home runs: 2
- Runs batted in: 107
- Stats at Baseball Reference

Teams
- Kansas City Athletics (1962–1966); Boston Red Sox (1966–1968); Oakland Athletics (1969–1970)

José Milages Tartabull Guzmán (born November 27, 1938) is a Cuban former professional baseball outfielder. He played in Major League Baseball (MLB) from 1962 to 1970 for the Kansas City / Oakland Athletics and Boston Red Sox.

== Career ==
Tartabull started his major career with the Kansas City Athletics. He made his first major appearance on April 10, 1962, in the ninth inning of the Opening Day against the Minnesota Twins, taking over for Leo Posada in centerfield (had the Twins rallied to force the bottom of the inning, he would have batted). Tartabull would makes appearances in 107 games for the Athletics, playing in center field (either for the whole game or near the end) or as a pinch hitter/runner. He batted .277 while stealing 19 bases on 24 attempts. He made it to the Opening Day roster the following year and started the whole game at center field. He hit his first ever home run on August 11 off Barry Latman in a 2–1 loss at Cleveland Stadium. He played in just 79 games (mostly in the field with a few pinch appearances), batting .240 while stealing 16 bases on 17 attempts.

He played in 104 games the next year, but he struggled to what would be his career-low in batting average with .200 while stealing four bases (he played 59 games in the outfield while pinch hitting 44 times and running 14 times). He played 54 games in the outfield in 1965 while pinch hitting 16 times in what was the first of only two years where he did not pinch-run the whole year; in 68 games, he batted .312 with eleven stolen bases on sixteen attempts. He hit his second (and last) career home run on August 1, doing so off Phil Ortega of the Washington Senators at Municipal Stadium. He stated that it was his short stroke of the bat as the reason he did not hit many home runs, since he utilized the slapped stroke to hit line drives or "hoppers" in the holes between the fielders.

He received a bit of change in 1966, as he played just 37 games with the Athletics before being traded to the Boston Red Sox on June 13 (going alongside Rollie Sheldon and John Wyatt) for Jim Gosger, Guido Grilli, and Ken Sanders. He played in 68 games for the team, mostly playing centerfield with a few pinch appearances. In a total of 105 games in the year, Tartabull batted .261 with 19 stolen bases on 23 attempts. The 1967 year proved to be a fruitful one for both Tartabull and the team. He played in 115 games, which was the most he ever played in his major league career. He played 82 games in the outfield (54 in right) while pinch hitting 35 times and pinch running 17 times. He batted .223 while stealing six bases on 12 attempts; his highest walk and strikeout total came here, walking 23 times and striking out 26 times.

A play he made at the plate on August 27 became his most memorable play among his career and with Red Sox fans. Playing the first game of a double-header against the Chicago White Sox, Duane Josephson was up to bat with one out in a 4–3 lead for Boston, with Ken Berry at third base in Comiskey Park. He lofted a fly ball to Tartabull in medium right field — a probable sacrifice fly that could have tied the game once Berry tagged third before running for home on the catch. When Tartabull caught the flyball, he lofted a high throw that Elston Howard managed to field in time, landing on his feet and blocking the plate while sweeping a tag on Berry just before he could slide in, clinching a double play and winning it for Boston. The win was the 73rd for the Red Sox, which kept them firmly locked into a tie with the Twins for first place in the American League (while Chicago was a game back). The Red Sox ultimately won the pennant (the second-to-last held before division play) by one game over Detroit and Minnesota.

The play is the subject of a novel, Tartabull's Throw, by Henry Garfield, published by Simon & Schuster in 2001. Tartabull appeared in all seven games of the classic 1967 World Series, with three as the starting right fielder and the other four in one-inning stints. He went 2-for-14 (collecting both hits in the Game 4 loss) while striking out twice with one walk.

He played in 72 games for the Red Sox in 1968, which turned out to be his last with the team. He batted .281 while stealing two bases on five attempts. On May 7, 1969, he was purchased by the Oakland Athletics. He played in 75 games that year (63 in the outfield while pinch hitting/running in 15). He batted .267 while stealing three bases on seven attempts. The following year was his last in the majors. He played just 24 games (six in the outfield while pinch-playing in 20 games) while collecting three hits in fourteen plate appearances. His career ended the way it had started: making a late appearance against the Minnesota Twins. On July 7, he pinch ran for Tommy Davis in the eighth inning and played left field for the last inning in a 4–2 loss.

He moved to playing for minor league teams after his major league career ended, and he soon became a minor league coach after he stopped playing entirely. He once served as the manager for a team in Sarasota in the Florida State League in the 1980s while seeing two of his sons try to make it to the majors.

== Career statistics ==
In 749 games over nine major league seasons, Tartabull posted a .261 batting average (484-for-1857) scoring 247 runs, with two home runs and 107 RBI. As an outfielder, he recorded a .986 fielding percentage at all three outfield positions, committing only 14 errors in 980 total chances. "Tartabull had great speed but no throwing arm," observed Tommy John.

== Personal life ==
Tartabull was born in Cienfuegos, Cuba. He and his wife lived in Puerto Rico before moving to the United States mainland. Their son, Danny Tartabull, was an All-Star major league baseball player, primarily with the Seattle Mariners, Kansas City Royals, and New York Yankees.
