= Guido Grilli =

American baseball player (born 1939)

- Pitcher
- Born: January 9, 1939 (age 86); Memphis, Tennessee, U.S.
- Batted: Left Threw: Left

MLB debut
- April 12, 1966, for the Boston Red Sox

Last MLB appearance
- July 16, 1966, for the Kansas City Athletics

MLB statistics
- Win–loss record: 0–2
- Earned run average: 7.08
- Strikeouts: 12
- Stats at Baseball Reference

Teams
- Boston Red Sox (1966); Kansas City Athletics (1966)

Guido John Grilli (born January 9, 1939) is an American former professional baseball pitcher. A left-hander, he appeared in Major League Baseball for the Boston Red Sox and Kansas City Athletics during the 1966 season. Grilli was born in Memphis, Tennessee, where he attended the University of Memphis. He was listed as 6 feet (1.8 m) tall and 188 pounds (85 kg).

Grilli signed with the Red Sox in 1959 and spent seven seasons working his way through their farm system. In 1965, a stellar season as a relief pitcher for the Toronto Maple Leafs, champions of the Triple-A International League, earned him a spot on Boston's 40-man winter roster. He started 1966 with the Red Sox, making his MLB debut on Opening Day (he issued a base on balls to the only hitter he faced, Curt Blefary of the Baltimore Orioles). But he struggled in six appearances and was sent back to Toronto during the May roster cutdown. Then, on June 13, Boston recalled Grilli and shipped him to the Athletics in a six-player trade that yielded relief pitcher John Wyatt and outfielder José Tartabull.

Grilli then worked in 16 games for Kansas City. Through June 29 and his first eight games pitched, his earned run average was a sparkling 1.42. But he was treated roughly three times in his next eight appearances—twice by the Orioles, en route to their 1966 World Series championship—and by July 16, his ERA in an Athletics' uniform had deteriorated to 6.89. He was sent to Triple-A Vancouver, and left baseball after that season.

In his 22-game MLB career, all in relief, Grilli posted a 0–2 won–lost record with a 7.08 ERA and one save in 20 1/3 innings of work. He gave up 24 hits and 20 bases on balls, with 12 strikeouts. His lone save came July 3 against the Detroit Tigers, when he preserved a 10–4 Kansas City triumph.
