= George Smith (second baseman) =

American baseball player (1937–1987)

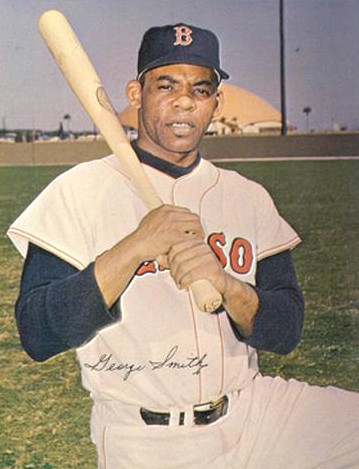
- Second baseman
- Born: July 7, 1937; St. Petersburg, Florida, U.S.
- Died: June 15, 1987 (aged 49); St. Petersburg, Florida, U.S.
- Batted: Right Threw: Right

MLB debut
- August 4, 1963, for the Detroit Tigers

Last MLB appearance
- September 17, 1966, for the Boston Red Sox

MLB statistics
- Batting average: .205
- Home runs: 9
- Runs batted in: 57
- Stats at Baseball Reference

Teams
- Detroit Tigers (1963–1965); Boston Red Sox (1966)

George Cornelius Smith (July 7, 1937 – June 15, 1987) was an American second baseman in Major League Baseball who played from 1963 through 1966 for the Detroit Tigers (1963–1965) and Boston Red Sox (1966). Listed at 5 ft 10 in (1.78 m), 170 lb., Smith batted and threw right-handed. A native of St. Petersburg, Florida, he attended Michigan State University.

In a four-season career, Smith was a .205 hitter (130-for-634) with nine home runs and 57 RBI in 217 games, including 64 runs, 27 doubles, six triples and nine stolen bases.

Smith played in the Negro leagues for the Indianapolis Clowns (1952) and the Chicago American Giants (1956–1957). In between, he had a brief trial with the unaffiliated St. Petersburg Saints of the Class D Florida State League in 1955. Then, in 1958, he signed with the Tigers' organization as a free agent. Smith was the Red Sox' semi-regular second baseman in 1966, starting 101 games at the position, but he batted only .213. He also played winter ball with the Navegantes del Magallanes club of the Venezuelan League in the 1966–67 season.

In 1967, Smith was hobbled by injuries and was replaced as Boston's second baseman by rookie Mike Andrews. He was sent to the San Francisco Giants' Triple-A Phoenix club and finished his career in the minors in 1968.

Smith died in 1987 in his hometown of St. Petersburg, Florida from cancer, at the age of 49.
