= Joe Foy =

American baseball player (1943–1989)

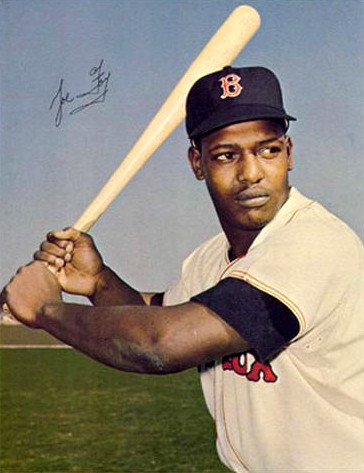
- Third baseman
- Born: February 21, 1943; New York City, U.S.
- Died: October 12, 1989 (aged 46); The Bronx, New York, U.S.
- Batted: Right Threw: Right

MLB debut
- April 13, 1966, for the Boston Red Sox

Last MLB appearance
- May 27, 1971, for the Washington Senators

MLB statistics
- Batting average: .248
- Home runs: 58
- Runs batted in: 291
- Stats at Baseball Reference

Teams
- Boston Red Sox (1966–1968); Kansas City Royals (1969); New York Mets (1970); Washington Senators (1971)

Joseph Anthony Foy (February 21, 1943 – October 12, 1989) was an American professional baseball player who played third base in Major League Baseball.

== Early life ==
Foy was born on February 21, 1943, in New York City, just seven blocks from Yankee Stadium, though he became a Brooklyn Dodgers fan. He attended Evander Childs High School in the Bronx, where he starred in baseball.

Foy was not signed by any professional baseball teams after graduating, and played for an amateur team, the New York Billikens. The Minnesota Twins then signed him for a $5,000 bonus in 1962.

== Professional baseball career ==
=== Minor leagues ===
The Twins assigned Foy to the Class D Erie Sailors, where he had a .285 batting average, 109 bases on balls, 9 home runs and 76 runs batted in (RBI) in 113 games.

Foy was later selected in 1962's minor league draft by the Boston Red Sox. In 1963, the Red Sox sent him to the Class A Wellsville Red Sox of the New York-Pennsylvania League and then the Winston-Salem Red Sox of the Carolina League, after hitting .350 in 28 games for Wellsville. Over the next three years, he played Double-A or Triple-A minor league baseball for the Seattle Rainiers, Reading Red Sox, and Toronto Maple Leafs of the International League (IL).

In 140 games with Toronto, Foy had a league leading .302 batting average with 77 runs scored, 73 RBIs,14 homeruns, 64 walks, and an .839 OPS. The Sporting News made him its Minor League Player of the Year, and he was chosen the third baseman on the IL's All-Star Team. He also was named IL Rookie-of-the-Year and Most Valuable Player. He did commit 26 (mostly throwing) errors, and had a .941 fielding percentage.

=== Boston Red Sox ===
In his first year in the major leagues, with the Boston Red Sox in 1966, Foy batted a solid .262, drew the second-most walks in the American League (91), had a .364 on-base percentage, good for eighth in the junior circuit, and .413 slugging percentage. He also scored 97 runs, fifth in the league. He had 21 errors and a .953 fielding percentage at third base.

As pitching became more dominant in the late 1960s, Foy's numbers dropped. In 1967, while receiving over 100 fewer at-bats, Foy batted slightly worse with a .251 batting average, .325 on base percentage, and .426 slugging percentage; and his walk total halved. The league itself dropped by 4 batting points, 2 on-base points, and 18 slugging points. Foy set a career-high for home runs with 16. He only batted 15 times in the Red Sox seven game loss to the St. Louis Cardinals in the 1967 World Series, with two hits, starting in three games and pinch hitting in three others.

In 1968, the "Year Of The Pitcher" (when Carl Yastrzemski led the league with a .301 batting average, and the American League batted just .230), Foy had a .225 average, .336 on-base percentage and .326 slugging percentage. His on-base percentage was 39 points above the league average, and his slugging and batting averages were roughly the same as the league average. He stole 26 bases that year and drew 84 walks.

=== Kansas City Royals ===
The Red Sox left Foy unprotected in the 1968 expansion draft where the Kansas City Royals selected him with the fourth pick. He had a fine season in 1969. While the league still only batted .246–.321–.369, Foy's numbers were .262–.354–.370. He also had 71 runs batted in, his career-high.

Then, in a move considered by some to be one of the best trades in Royals history, Kansas City traded Foy to the third baseman-hungry Mets for Amos Otis and Bob Johnson. Otis developed into an All-Star, and an occasional MVP candidate. The Royals then traded Johnson the following year, after a 200 strikeout season, to the Pittsburgh Pirates for shortstop Fred Patek, who became another cornerstone of their rising franchise.

=== New York Mets ===
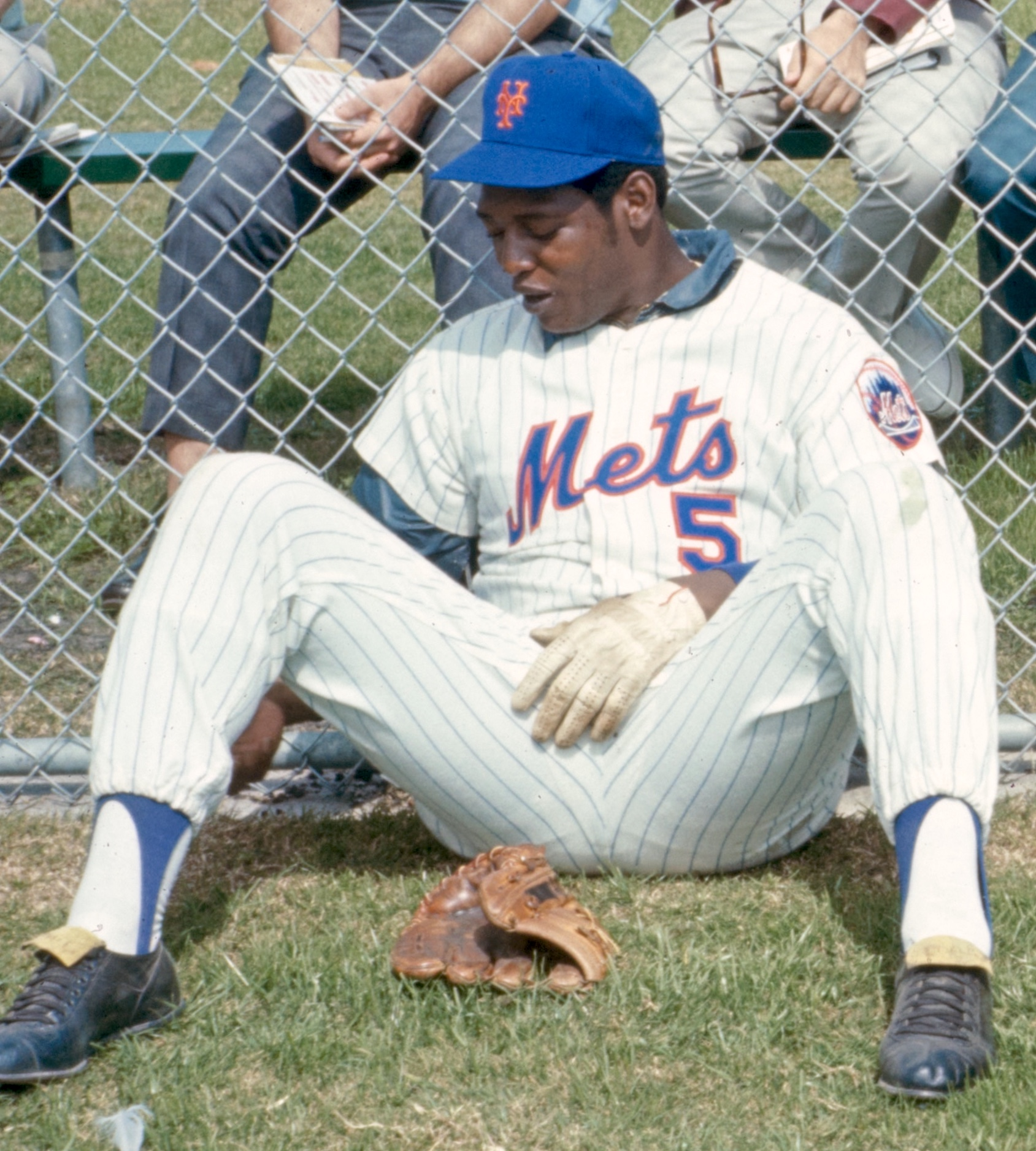
Foy with the Mets during spring training in 1970

Foy posted a career-best .373 OBP while hitting .236–.373–.329 with 6 home runs and 37 RBIs in 322 at-bats with New York.

His best day with the Mets, and perhaps of his entire career, came on July 19, 1970 when he went 5-for-5 with a double, two home runs, and five runs batted in as the Mets edged the Giants, 7–6, in 10 innings at San Francisco.

Although his averages were not that far off from his career average, Foy was considered a disappointment to Mets fans. Additionally, according to Mets pitcher Jerry Koosman, Foy fell under the influence of his old friends in the Bronx. In the first game of one doubleheader, Koosman and others thought he was high on some kind of drug (eventually confirmed to be marijuana), especially when he walked in front of manager Gil Hodges in the dugout during a pitch and started cheering. Still, Hodges started him at third base in the second game. The first batter hit a hard ground ball by Foy. He never even saw it, but even after it went by him, he kept punching his glove and yelling, "Hit it to me, hit it to me." Koosman and others all wanted Foy out right then, but according to Koosman, Hodges left Foy in the game just a little longer to show that he didn't fit on the team.

After the season, the Mets left him off the roster, and the Washington Senators drafted him in the Rule 5 draft.

=== Washington Senators ===
Foy was only an average batter with the Senators batting .234–.363–.297 in 128 at-bats. He was sent to the minors in May. After batting .191 in 15 games, he was released on July 16, 1971 at age 28, and never played in another professional baseball game.

Towards the end of his career his performance was hindered by substance abuse, which continued after his retirement.

== Personal life ==
After his career ended, Foy overcame his substance abuse issues and went to school at Lehman College in the Bronx to become a counselor. He became a counselor for troubled youth in his native New York-area, and a youth baseball coach.

== Death ==
He died as the result of a massive heart attack at his home in New York on October 12, 1989, at the age of 46. He had suffered from diabetes and heart issues.
