= Jim Gosger =

American baseball player (born 1942)

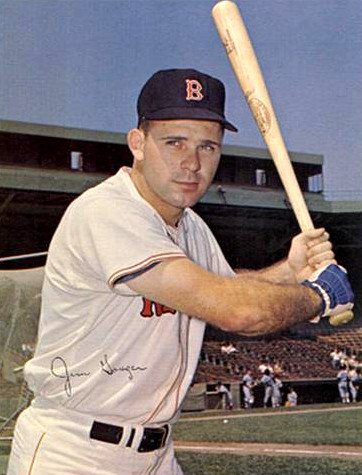
- Gosger in 1966
- Outfielder
- Born: November 6, 1942 (age 82); Port Huron, Michigan, U.S.
- Batted: Left Threw: Left

MLB debut
- May 4, 1963, for the Boston Red Sox

Last MLB appearance
- September 22, 1974, for the New York Mets

MLB statistics
- Batting average: .226
- Home runs: 30
- Runs batted in: 177
- Stats at Baseball Reference

Teams
- Boston Red Sox (1963, 1965–1966); Kansas City/Oakland Athletics (1966–1968); Seattle Pilots (1969); New York Mets (1969); Montreal Expos (1970–1971); New York Mets (1973–1974)

James Charles Gosger (born November 6, 1942) is an American former professional baseball player. He played in the major leagues for 10 seasons between 1963 and 1974, for five different teams, primarily as an outfielder. He was listed at 5 feet 11 inches (1.80 m) and 185 pounds (84 kg); he batted and threw left-handed.

== Career ==
Gosger attended St. Stephen High School in Port Huron, Michigan, where he played baseball, basketball and football. He attended St. Clair County Community College and played for their basketball team, before signing a contract with a large signing bonus with the Boston Red Sox in January 1962. He spent the 1962 season in Minor League Baseball with the Winston-Salem Red Sox, but was then subjected to baseball's bonus rule for the 1963 season. The rule required teams to carry players who received large bonuses on their major-league rosters.

Gosger spent 1963 with the Red Sox, appearing in 19 games. He also played for the Red Sox during 1965–1966, then played for the Kansas City/Oakland Athletics (1966–1968), Seattle Pilots (1969), New York Mets (1969), Montreal Expos (1970–1971), and then returned to the Mets (1973–1974). In 1966 with Boston and Kansas City, he posted career-highs in at bats (398), hits (93), doubles (18), home runs (10) and RBIs (44) while batting .234 in 128 combined games. He was traded along with Bob Heise from the Mets to the San Francisco Giants for Ray Sadecki and Dave Marshall on December 12, 1969.

Overall, in 705 major-league games, he batted .226 with 30 home runs and 177 RBIs. He played primarily as an outfielder, while also making some appearances as a first baseman.

In June 2019, the Mets accidentally included Gosger in a video meant to honor deceased members of their 1969 championship team; the Mets later apologized to Gosger.

As of 2024, Gosger was still living in Port Huron.

The 2025 Preakness Stakes featured a colt named Gosger; the Preakness represented the third start for the colt, Gosger finished 2nd. The colt won the Lexington Stakes in April 2025.
