= 1971 Major League Baseball postseason =

1971 Major League Baseball playoffs

Tournament details
- Dates: October 2–17, 1971
- Teams: 4

Final positions
- Champions: Pittsburgh Pirates (4th title)
- Runners-up: Baltimore Orioles

Tournament statistics
- Games played: 14
- Attendance: 619,139 (44,224 per game)
- Most HRs: Bob Robertson (PIT) (3)
- Most SBs: Manny Sanguillén (PIT) (3)
- Most Ks (as pitcher): Steve Blass (PIT) (24)

Awards
- MVP: Roberto Clemente (PIT)

The 1971 Major League Baseball postseason was the playoff tournament of Major League Baseball for the 1971 season. The winners of each division advance to the postseason and face each other in a League Championship Series to determine the pennant winners that face each other in the World Series.

In the American League, the Baltimore Orioles were making their third straight postseason appearance, and the Oakland Athletics made their first postseason appearance since 1931, when the team was still based out of Philadelphia, ending what was the longest active playoff appearance drought in the majors and all four major North American leagues. This was the first of five consecutive postseason appearances for the Athletics from 1971 to 1975.

In the National League, the Pittsburgh Pirates made their second straight postseason appearance. Joining them were the San Francisco Giants, who made their first postseason appearance since 1962. This marked the first time that both teams from the San Francisco Bay Area made the postseason. This was San Francisco’s last postseason appearance until 1987.

The playoffs began on October 2, 1971, and concluded on October 17, 1971, with the Pittsburgh Pirates defeating the Baltimore Orioles in seven games in the 1971 World Series. It was the Pirates' fourth championship in franchise history and their first since 1960.

== Teams ==
American League Teams National League Teams

The following teams qualified for the postseason:

=== American League ===
- Baltimore Orioles – 101–57, AL East champions
- Oakland Athletics – 101–60, AL West champions

=== National League ===
- Pittsburgh Pirates – 97–65, NL East champions
- San Francisco Giants – 90–72, NL West champions

== Playoff bracket ==
League Championship Series (ALCS, NLCS)
East	Baltimore	3
West	Oakland	0
East	Pittsburgh	3
West	San Francisco	1

World Series
AL	Baltimore	3
NL	Pittsburgh	4

== American League Championship Series ==
=== Baltimore Orioles vs. Oakland Athletics ===
Baltimore won the series, 3–0.

Game	Date	Score	Location	Time	Attendance
1	October 3	Oakland Athletics – 3, Baltimore Orioles – 5	Memorial Stadium	2:23	42,621
2	October 4	Oakland Athletics – 1, Baltimore Orioles – 5	Memorial Stadium	2:04	35,003
3	October 5	Baltimore Orioles – 5, Oakland Athletics – 3	Oakland-Alameda County Coliseum	2:49	33,176

This was the first postseason meeting between the Orioles and Athletics. This was also the first of ten ALCS series between 1971 and 1981 to feature either the Athletics or the Kansas City Royals. The Orioles swept the Athletics to return to the World Series for the third year in a row.

In Game 1, the Athletics held a 3–1 lead after six innings, until the Orioles rallied with four unanswered runs in the bottom of the seventh thanks to Curt Motton and Paul Blair, and took Game 1 by a 5–3 score. Mike Cuellar pitched a complete game in Game 2, holding the Athletics to just six hits as the Orioles won by a 5–1 score to go up 2–0 in the series headed to Oakland. In the Athletics first postseason game during their time in Oakland, Jim Palmer pitched yet another complete game as the Orioles clinched their third straight pennant despite giving up three home runs. The Athletics became the third 100+ win team to be eliminated from the postseason in a sweep, joining the 1954 Cleveland Indians and the 1963 New York Yankees.

This was the first of five straight ALCS appearances for the Athletics. They would return to the ALCS the following year, and defeated the Detroit Tigers in five games en route to starting a World Series three-peat.

The Orioles would win their next pennant in 1979 over the California Angels in four games before falling in the World Series.

The Orioles and Athletics would meet in the ALCS two more times in 1973 and 1974, which were both won by the Athletics en route to World Series titles.

== National League Championship Series ==
=== Pittsburgh Pirates vs. San Francisco Giants ===
Pittsburgh won the series, 3–1.

Game	Date	Score	Location	Time	Attendance
1	October 2	Pittsburgh Pirates – 4, San Francisco Giants – 5	Candlestick Park	2:44	40,977
2	October 3	Pittsburgh Pirates – 9, San Francisco Giants – 4	Candlestick Park	3:23	42,562
3	October 5	San Francisco Giants – 1, Pittsburgh Pirates – 2	Three Rivers Stadium	2:26	38,222
4	October 6	San Francisco Giants – 5, Pittsburgh Pirates – 9	Three Rivers Stadium	3:00	35,487

This was the first postseason meeting between the Pirates and Giants. The Pirates defeated the Giants in four games to return to the World Series for the first time since 1960.

In San Francisco, the Giants took Game 1 at home, thanks to dual two-run home runs from Tito Fuentes and Willie McCovey in the fifth inning. In Game 2, the Pirates blew out the Giants to even the series headed to Pittsburgh, in part thanks to three home runs from Bob Robertson, who became the first to hit three home runs in a single postseason game. Game 3 was a pitchers duel that lasted seven and a half innings, until Richie Hebner hit a solo homer that put the Pirates in the lead for good in the bottom of the eighth, giving the Pirates the series lead. Game 4 was a back-and-forth slugfest that was won by the Pirates as they clinched the pennant. This is the fifth-most recent playoff series won by the Pirates. This was the first LCS to not end in a sweep, as both the ALCS and NLCS in 1969 and 1970 ended in sweeps.

The Pirates would return to the NLCS the next year, but they narrowly lost to their archrival in the Cincinnati Reds in five games after being three outs away from a second straight pennant in Game 5. The Pirates would go on to lose in the NLCS two more times after that before finally winning the pennant again in 1979 over the Reds in a sweep en route to their most recent championship.

The Giants would return to the NLCS in 1987, but they lost to the St. Louis Cardinals in seven games. They would win the pennant again in 1989 over the Chicago Cubs in five games before falling in the World Series.

Both teams would meet again in the Wild Card Game in 2014, which the Giants won 8–0 en route to a World Series title.

== 1971 World Series ==
=== Baltimore Orioles (AL) vs. Pittsburgh Pirates (NL) ===
Pittsburgh won the series, 4–3.

Game	Date	Score	Location	Time	Attendance
1	October 9	Pittsburgh Pirates – 3, Baltimore Orioles – 5	Memorial Stadium	2:06	53,229
2	October 11†	Pittsburgh Pirates – 3, Baltimore Orioles – 11	Memorial Stadium	2:55	53,239
3	October 12	Baltimore Orioles – 1, Pittsburgh Pirates – 5	Three Rivers Stadium	2:20	50,403
4	October 13	Baltimore Orioles – 3, Pittsburgh Pirates – 4	Three Rivers Stadium	2:48	51,378
5	October 14	Baltimore Orioles – 0, Pittsburgh Pirates – 4	Three Rivers Stadium	2:16	51,377
6	October 16	Pittsburgh Pirates – 2, Baltimore Orioles – 3 (10)	Memorial Stadium	2:59	44,174
7	October 17	Pittsburgh Pirates – 2, Baltimore Orioles – 1	Memorial Stadium	2:10	47,291

†: postponed from October 10 due to rain

This was the first of two World Series during the decade to feature the Pirates and Orioles. The Pirates overcame a two-games-to-none series deficit to defeat the defending World Series champion Orioles in seven games, claiming their first title since 1960.

The Orioles seemed on track for a sweep at first - Dave McNally pitched a complete game as the Orioles took Game 1 by a 5–3 score. Game 1 was Bill Mazeroski’s final postseason game. In Game 2, Jim Palmer pitched eight solid innings as the Orioles blew out the Pirates to go up 2–0 in the series. However, when the series shifted to Pittsburgh, the Pirates responded. They took Game 3 off a complete game performance from Steve Blass. In Game 4, the first night game in World Series history, the score was tied at three until the bottom of the seventh, when Pittsburgh's Milt May hit an RBI single which scored Bob Robertson, and the Pirates held on to even the series at two games each. Nelson Briles then pitched a two-hit complete game shutout in Game 5 as the Pirates won 4–0 and took a 3–2 series lead. Back in Baltimore, the Orioles rallied to defeat the Pirates in extra innings to force a seventh game. However, the Pirates would take Game 7 by a 2–1 score, as Blass defeated Baltimore's Mike Cuellar in a pitchers duel, securing his second complete game victory of the series. Roberto Clemente was named World Series MVP.

This is the Pirates’ fourth-most recent victory in a postseason series. Both the Pirates and Orioles would meet again in the 1979 World Series, which the Pirates also won in seven games after trailing 3–1 in the series and being twelve outs away from elimination in Game 7, and it remains the Pirates’ last championship to date.

The Orioles would eventually win the championship again in 1983 over the Philadelphia Phillies in five games.

== Broadcasting ==
NBC televised all postseason games nationally in the United States. Each team's local broadcaster also televised coverage of LCS games.
