= 1971 National League Championship Series =

3rd edition of Major League Baseball's National League Championship Series

Team (Wins)	Managers	Season
Pittsburgh Pirates (3)	Danny Murtaugh	97–65, .599, GA: 7
San Francisco Giants (1)	Charlie Fox	90–72, .556, GA: 1
- Dates: October 2–6
- Umpires: Tom Gorman (crew chief); Shag Crawford; Lee Weyer; Andy Olsen; Dick Stello; Satch Davidson

Broadcast
- Television: NBC; KDKA-TV (PIT); KTVU (SF)
- TV announcers: NBC: Curt Gowdy and Tony Kubek (in San Francisco); Jim Simpson and Sandy Koufax (in Pittsburgh); KDKA-TV: Nellie King and Bob Prince; KTVU: Lon Simmons and Bill Thompson

The 1971 National League Championship Series was a best-of-five series in Major League Baseball’s 1971 postseason that pitted the East Division champion Pittsburgh Pirates against the West Division champion San Francisco Giants. The Pirates won the Series three games to one and won the 1971 World Series against the Baltimore Orioles. The Giants did not return to the postseason until 1987.

This was the third National League Championship Series in all. It was the first League Championship Series in either league that was not a sweep for the winning team (Baltimore swept Oakland in the 1971 ALCS).

== Summary ==
=== Pittsburgh Pirates vs. San Francisco Giants ===
Pittsburgh won the series, 3–1.

Game	Date	Score	Location	Time	Attendance
1	October 2	Pittsburgh Pirates – 4, San Francisco Giants – 5	Candlestick Park	2:44	40,977
2	October 3	Pittsburgh Pirates – 9, San Francisco Giants – 4	Candlestick Park	3:23	42,562
3	October 5	San Francisco Giants – 1, Pittsburgh Pirates – 2	Three Rivers Stadium	2:26	38,222
4	October 6	San Francisco Giants – 5, Pittsburgh Pirates – 9	Three Rivers Stadium	3:00	35,487

== Game summaries ==
=== Game 1 ===
October 2, 1971 1:00 pm (PT) at Candlestick Park in San Francisco, California
Team	1	2	3	4	5	6	7	8	9	R	H	E
Pittsburgh	0	0	2	0	0	0	2	0	0	4	9	0
San Francisco	0	0	1	0	4	0	0	0	X	5	7	2
WP: Gaylord Perry (1–0) LP: Steve Blass (0–1); Home runs: PIT: None; SF: Tito Fuentes (1), Willie McCovey (1)

With aces Gaylord Perry and Steve Blass taking the mound for their respective teams, Game 1 looked to be a pitchers' duel. But the offenses were effective. The Pirates struck for two in the top of the third when Dave Cash doubled home Jackie Hernández. Cash scored the second run when Richie Hebner grounded to Tito Fuentes at second, but Willie McCovey dropped Fuentes' throw when he attempted to field the ball after having to scramble back to first because Perry didn't cover the bag. The Giants halved the lead in their half of the third when Chris Speier singled, went to second on a Perry sacrifice bunt, and scored on a Ken Henderson single.

Fuentes and McCovey would redeem themselves in the fifth by each slamming two-run homers off Blass for a 5–2 lead. Al Oliver cut the deficit to 5–4 for the Pirates with two-run single in the seventh, but that was it as Perry went the distance for a complete game win.

=== Game 2 ===
October 3, 1971 1:00 pm (PT) at Candlestick Park in San Francisco, California
Team	1	2	3	4	5	6	7	8	9	R	H	E
Pittsburgh	0	1	0	2	1	0	4	0	1	9	15	0
San Francisco	1	1	0	0	0	0	0	0	2	4	9	0
WP: Dock Ellis (1–0) LP: John Cumberland (0–1); Home runs: PIT: Bob Robertson 3 (3), Gene Clines (1); SF: Willie Mays (1)

In front of an NBC-TV audience, Pirate first baseman Bob Robertson grew into a star in Game 2. Robertson smashed three homers, becoming the first to do so in a playoff game. The Giants struck first in the bottom of the first when Tito Fuentes singled off Dock Ellis and scored on a double by Willie Mays. After the Pirates tied the game in the second off John Cumberland when Robertson hit a leadoff double and scored on Manny Sanguillén's single, the Giants retook the lead in the bottom half when Chris Speier hit a leadoff double and scored on Ken Henderson's single. Robertson's first home run of the game tied the score again in the fourth. Sanguillén's single then knocked Cumberland out of the game. After a stolen base, Jackie Hernández's RBI single off Jim Barr put the Pirates up 3–2. Gene Clines's home run next inning extended their lead to 4–2. A pivotal play occurred just prior to the Pirates' 4-run seventh, when Mays, batting in the bottom of the sixth with two out and his team trailing, 4–2, saw his bid for a bases-clearing double grabbed by right fielder Roberto Clemente. After a leadoff double and single, Clemente's RBI single off Don Carrithers made it 5–2 Pirates. One out later, Robertsons' three-run home run off Ron Bryant extended their lead to 8–2. Robertson's third home run in the ninth off of Steve Hamilton made it 9–2. A two-run home run from Mays off Bob Miller in the bottom half made it 9–4, but Dave Giusti in relief retired all three batters he faced as the Pirates tied the series heading to Pittsburgh.

=== Game 3 ===
October 5, 1971 1:30 pm (ET) at Three Rivers Stadium in Pittsburgh, Pennsylvania
Team	1	2	3	4	5	6	7	8	9	R	H	E
San Francisco	0	0	0	0	0	1	0	0	0	1	5	2
Pittsburgh	0	1	0	0	0	0	0	1	X	2	4	1
WP: Bob Johnson (1–0) LP: Juan Marichal (0–1) Sv: Dave Giusti (1); Home runs: SF: None; PIT: Bob Robertson (4), Richie Hebner (1)

The Pirates' Bob Johnson and the Giants' Juan Marichal locked into a tight pitcher's duel for eight innings. Bob Robertson hit a homer in the second, his then-record fourth of the series. The Giants tied it in the sixth when Ken Henderson singled and scored when third baseman Richie Hebner threw wildly past Robertson at first after fielding a bunt by Tito Fuentes.

Hebner would atone for the error, however, by slamming a game-winning homer in the eighth off Marichal. Dave Giusti came on in the ninth and saved it for Johnson and the Pirates.

=== Game 4 ===
October 6, 1971 1:30 pm (ET) at Three Rivers Stadium in Pittsburgh, Pennsylvania
Team	1	2	3	4	5	6	7	8	9	R	H	E
San Francisco	1	4	0	0	0	0	0	0	0	5	10	0
Pittsburgh	2	3	0	0	0	4	0	0	X	9	11	2
WP: Bruce Kison (1–0) LP: Gaylord Perry (1–1); Home runs: SF: Chris Speier (1), Willie McCovey (2); PIT: Richie Hebner (2), Al Oliver (1)

Another anticipated pitching duel between Giants' Gaylord Perry and Pirates' Steve Blass quickly went by the wayside. Blass lasted only two innings, giving up five runs. Willie McCovey's RBI single with two on in the first gave the Giants a 1–0 lead, but they left the bases loaded. In the bottom half, after a leadoff single and double, Roberto Clemente's two-run single put the Pirates up 2–1, but in the second, Chris Speier's leadoff home run tied the game. After two singles and two outs, Willie McCovey's three-run home run put the Giants up 5–2, but the Pirates, however, got Blass off the hook in the bottom of the inning. Manny Sanguillen singled and 1960 World Series hero Bill Mazeroski, hitting for Blass, also singled. Richie Hebner then tied the game with a three-run home run. The score stayed at 5–5 until the sixth when Dave Cash singled, moved to second on a groundout, and scored on a Roberto Clemente RBI single. Jerry Johnson relieved Perry and after intentionally walking Willie Stargell, Al Oliver's three-run home run made it 9–5 Pirates. Meanwhile, Bruce Kison and Dave Giusti pitched the last seven innings of shutout baseball to close out the series and win the pennant for the first time in 11 years. It is Pittsburgh’s fifth-most recent victory in a postseason series.

== Composite box ==
1971 NLCS (3–1): Pittsburgh Pirates over San Francisco Giants

Team	1	2	3	4	5	6	7	8	9	R	H	E
Pittsburgh Pirates	2	5	2	2	1	4	6	1	1	24	39	3
San Francisco Giants	2	5	1	0	4	1	0	0	2	15	31	4
Total attendance: 157,248 Average attendance: 39,312
