= 1971 American League Championship Series =

3rd edition of Major League Baseball's American League Championship Series

Team (Wins)	Managers	Season
Baltimore Orioles (3)	Earl Weaver	101–57, .639, GA: 12
Oakland Athletics (0)	Dick Williams	101–60, .627, GA: 16
- Dates: October 3–5
- Umpires: Hank Soar; Larry Napp; Lou DiMuro; Jake O'Donnell; Ron Luciano; Bill Kunkel

Broadcast
- Television: NBC; KBHK-TV (OAK; Game 1 only); WJZ-TV (BAL)
- TV announcers: NBC: Jim Simpson and Sandy Koufax (Game 2); Curt Gowdy and Tony Kubek (Game 3) (NBC did not televise Game 1 due to conflicts with its NFL coverage.); KBHK-TV: Monte Moore and Bob Elson (Game 1 only); WJZ-TV: Chuck Thompson, Bill O'Donnell and John Gordon

The 1971 American League Championship Series was a semifinal matchup in Major League Baseball's 1971 postseason between the East Division Champion Baltimore Orioles and the West Division Champion Oakland Athletics. The Orioles swept the A's in three games, despite the fact that each team had won 101 games. The Orioles won their third consecutive pennant in the process, but lost the 1971 World Series to the Pittsburgh Pirates.

This was the first of ten AL Championship series between 1971 and 1981 that featured either the Oakland Athletics or the Kansas City Royals.

The only time neither team appeared in the ALCS during that period was in 1979 when the Angels won the AL West.

== Summary ==
=== Oakland Athletics vs. Baltimore Orioles ===
Baltimore won the series, 3–0.

Game	Date	Score	Location	Time	Attendance
1	October 3	Oakland A's – 3, Baltimore Orioles – 5	Memorial Stadium	2:23	42,621
2	October 4	Oakland A's – 1, Baltimore Orioles – 5	Memorial Stadium	2:04	35,003
3	October 5	Baltimore Orioles – 5, Oakland A's – 3	Oakland-Alameda County Coliseum	2:49	33,176

== Game summaries ==
=== Game 1 ===
October 3, 1971 2:00 pm (ET) at Memorial Stadium in Baltimore, Maryland
Team	1	2	3	4	5	6	7	8	9	R	H	E
Oakland	0	2	0	1	0	0	0	0	0	3	9	0
Baltimore	0	0	0	1	0	0	4	0	X	5	7	1
WP: Dave McNally (1–0) LP: Vida Blue (0–1) Sv: Eddie Watt (1)

Dave McNally, a 20-game winner for the fourth season in a row, survived a rocky start to win the opener, which was delayed one day by rain. He trailed, 3–0, after four innings pitched, giving up three doubles and a triple. The Athletics had McNally tottering in the second inning. With two runs home, a runner on second and none out, second baseman Dick Green came to bat. It was at this point that Athletics manager Dick Williams made the first of several ultra-cautious moves which were to fuel criticism of his playoff strategy. He ordered Green to sacrifice, which put runner Dave Duncan on third with one out.

The next batter was Blue, whose bunting ability is well known, Vida tried to squeeze the run home, But the Orioles had guessed correctly on what was coming. McNally pitched out and Duncan was nailed in a rundown. Blue proceeded to strike out, and the Athletics' splurge was over. McNally gave up another run in the fourth, but that ended the A's scoring forays. Meanwhile, 24-game winner Blue yielded just one run and three hits during the first six innings.

However, disaster overtook Vida in the very next frame. Frank Robinson led off with a walk and Boog Powell struck out. Brooks Robinson's single sent Frank Robinson to second, after which Andy Etchebarren's fly to right advanced Frank Robinson to third. Now there were runners on first and third with two down, and Blue appeared likely to quell the flurry without damage. After all, he had beaten the Orioles twice in two tries during the season. And the next hitter was shortstop Mark Belanger, hardly a nemesis to any pitcher. But Belanger rifled a single to center to score Frank Robinson and ignite thunderous cheering from the crowd of 42,621.

Then Curt Motton, pinch-hitter hero of a 1969 Orioles playoff victory (Game 2) over Minnesota, stepped up to bat for McNally. Curt slammed a double to the left-field corner, plating Brooks Robinson and tying the score. Center fielder Paul Blair followed with the blow that doomed Blue, a two-run double to left. Reliever Eddie Watt blanked the Athletics the last two innings and Oakland was one game down. Skipper Williams was subjected to further sharpshooting for his failure to remove Blue, or even visit the mound, during the seventh-inning barrage.

Dave Johnson's error in the sixth inning was the only miscue between both teams in the series.

=== Game 2 ===
October 4, 1971 1:00 pm (ET) at Memorial Stadium in Baltimore, Maryland
Team	1	2	3	4	5	6	7	8	9	R	H	E
Oakland	0	0	0	1	0	0	0	0	0	1	6	0
Baltimore	0	1	1	0	0	0	1	2	X	5	7	0
WP: Mike Cuellar (1–0) LP: Catfish Hunter (0–1); Home runs: OAK: None; BAL: Brooks Robinson (1), Boog Powell 2 (2), Elrod Hendricks (1)

Catfish Hunter held Baltimore to seven hits, but four of them were home runs. Boog Powell walloped two, Brooks Robinson and Elrod Hendricks the others. Cuellar displayed his usual pitching artistry, a baffling assortment of curves and change-ups which the Athletics solved for a mere six hits.

Typical of the Athletics' super-cautious approach to their task was an incident in the sixth inning when they were trailing, 2–1. Reggie Jackson led off against Cuellar with a double. Cleanup hitter Tommy Davis was up next and to the surprise of everyone in the park, he bunted. The next two hitters were easy outs. Davis' sacrifice, it turned out, was not ordered by Williams.

=== Game 3 ===
October 5, 1971 12:00 pm (PT) at Oakland-Alameda County Coliseum in Oakland, California
Team	1	2	3	4	5	6	7	8	9	R	H	E
Baltimore	1	0	0	0	2	0	2	0	0	5	12	0
Oakland	0	0	1	0	0	1	0	1	0	3	7	0
WP: Jim Palmer (1–0) LP: Diego Segui (0–1); Home runs: BAL: None; OAK: Reggie Jackson 2 (2), Sal Bando (1)

Jim Palmer's performance in the deciding game was not among his most noteworthy—he permitted three home runs, two of them by the slugging Jackson and the other by Sal Bando. But all three shots were struck with the bases empty, and Palmer had more than enough to pitch Baltimore's pennant clincher for the third straight year. Loser of his only two starts against Baltimore during the season, Diego Segui reached the fifth inning of Game 3 with the score 1–1. Then he met his "Waterloo". The crusher was Brooks Robinson's two-run single. It came after Williams ordered an intentional pass to Hendricks. loading the bases.

Bando's homer cut the Athletics' deficit to 3–2 in the sixth. But in the seventh, Frank Robinson's double and Darold Knowles' wild pitch put Baltimore out of danger. The Orioles collected 12 hits off Segui and his four successors, with Don Buford's triple and two singles leading the way.

== Composite box ==
1971 ALCS (3–0): Baltimore Orioles over Oakland Athletics

Team	1	2	3	4	5	6	7	8	9	R	H	E
Baltimore Orioles	1	1	1	1	2	0	7	2	0	15	26	1
Oakland Athletics	0	2	1	2	0	1	0	1	0	7	22	0
Total attendance: 110,800 Average attendance: 36,933
