= 1971 Oakland Athletics season =

1971 Oakland Athletics
- American League West champions
- League: American League
- Division: West
- Ballpark: Oakland-Alameda County Coliseum
- City: Oakland, California
- Record: 101–60 (.627)
- Owners: Charles O. Finley
- Managers: Dick Williams
- Television: KBHK-TV
- Radio: KEST (Monte Moore, Bob Elson, Red Rush)

The 1971 Oakland Athletics season was the 71st season for the Oakland Athletics franchise, all as members of the American League, and their 4th season in Oakland. The Athletics finished first in the American League West with a record of 101 wins and 60 losses (their best record in the Swingin' A's era). In their first postseason appearance of any kind since 1931, the A's were swept in three games by the Baltimore Orioles in the American League Championship Series. This would be the final season that the team wore the vest-style uniforms, they would switch to their Swingin' A's era uniforms the next year.

== Offseason ==
- January 13, 1971: 1971 Major League Baseball draft (January draft) notable picks:

Round 5: Rich Dauer (did not sign)

Secondary Phase

Round 1: Phil Garner
Round 3: Steve Staggs (did not sign)

== Regular season ==
Vida Blue became the first black player in the history of the American League to win the American League Cy Young Award. He was also the youngest AL player in the 20th century to win the MVP Award. During the year, Vida Blue was on the cover of Sports Illustrated and Time magazine.

=== Season standings ===
AL West
Team	W	L	Pct.	GB	Home	Road
Oakland Athletics	101	60	.627	—	46‍–‍35	55‍–‍25
Kansas City Royals	85	76	.528	16	44‍–‍37	41‍–‍39
Chicago White Sox	79	83	.488	22½	39‍–‍42	40‍–‍41
California Angels	76	86	.469	25½	35‍–‍46	41‍–‍40
Minnesota Twins	74	86	.463	26½	37‍–‍42	37‍–‍44
Milwaukee Brewers	69	92	.429	32	34‍–‍48	35‍–‍44

=== Record vs. opponents ===
1971 American League record Sources:
Team	BAL	BOS	CAL	CWS	CLE	DET	KC	MIL	MIN	NYY	OAK	WAS
Baltimore	—	9–9	7–5	8–4	13–5	8–10	6–5	9–3	10–2	11–7	7–4	13–3
Boston	9–9	—	6–6	10–2	11–7	12–6	1–11	6–6	8–4	7–11	3–9	12–6
California	5–7	6–6	—	8–10	8–4	6–6	8–10	6–12	12–6	6–6	7–11	4–8
Chicago	4–8	2–10	10–8	—	3–9	7–5	9–9	11–7	7–11	5–7	11–7	10–2
Cleveland	5–13	7–11	4–8	9–3	—	6–12	2–10	4–8	4–8	8–10	4–8	7–11
Detroit	10–8	6–12	6–6	5–7	12–6	—	8–4	10–2	6–6	10–8	4–8	14–4
Kansas City	5–6	11–1	10–8	9–9	10–2	4–8	—	8–10	9–9	5–7	5–13	9–3
Milwaukee	3–9	6–6	12–6	7–11	8–4	2–10	10–8	—	10–7	2–10	3–15	6–6
Minnesota	2–10	4–8	6–12	11–7	8–4	6–6	9–9	7–10	—	8–4	8–10	5–6
New York	7–11	11–7	6–6	7–5	10–8	8–10	7–5	10–2	4–8	—	5–7	7–11
Oakland	4–7	9–3	11–7	7–11	8–4	8–4	13–5	15–3	10–8	7–5	—	9–3
Washington	3–13	6–12	8–4	2–10	11–7	4–14	3–9	6–6	6–5	11–7	3–9	—

=== Opening day starters ===
- 1B Don Mincher
- 2B Dick Green
- 3B Sal Bando
- SS Bert Campaneris
- LF Felipe Alou
- CF Rick Monday
- RF Reggie Jackson
- C Dave Duncan
- P Vida Blue

=== Notable transactions ===
- May 8, 1971: Frank Fernández, Don Mincher, Paul Lindblad, and cash were traded by the Athletics to the Washington Senators for Darold Knowles and Mike Epstein.
- May 26, 1971: Rob Gardner was traded by the Athletics to the New York Yankees for Curt Blefary.
- June 12, 1971: Champ Summers was signed by the Athletics as an amateur free agent.

=== Roster ===
1971 Oakland Athletics
Roster
Pitchers: 35 Vida Blue; 29 Chuck Dobson; 34 Rollie Fingers; 56 Rob Gardner; 16,56 Mudcat Grant; 27 Catfish Hunter; 17 Ron Klimkowski; 32 Darold Knowles; 14 Marcel Lachemann; 25 Paul Lindblad; 36 Bob Locker; 13 Blue Moon Odom; 16 Jim Panther; 58 Daryl Patterson; 33 Jim Roland; 24 Diego Seguí	Catchers: 39 Curt Blefary; 10 Dave Duncan; 16,39 Frank Fernández; 38 Gene Tenace; Infielders: 11 Dwain Anderson; 6 Sal Bando; 8 Larry Brown; 19 Bert Campaneris; 12 Tommy Davis; 5 Mike Epstein; 1 Dick Green; 20 Mike Hegan; 42 Tony La Russa; 5 Don Mincher; 52 Ray Webster	Outfielders: 8 Felipe Alou; 3 Adrian Garrett; 25 George Hendrick; 28 Steve Hovley; 9 Reggie Jackson; 2 Ángel Mangual; 7 Rick Monday; 26 Joe Rudi; Other batters: 3 Ron Clark	Manager: 23 Dick Williams; Coaches: 44 Vern Hoscheit; 41 Jerry Lumpe; 43 Irv Noren; 40 Bill Posedel

== Player stats ==
= Indicates team leader

=== Batting ===
==== Starters by position ====
Note: Pos = Position; G = Games played; AB = At bats; H = Hits; Avg. = Batting average; HR = Home runs; RBI = Runs batted in

Pos	Player	G	AB	H	Avg.	HR	RBI
C	Dave Duncan	103	363	92	.253	15	40
1B	Mike Epstein	104	329	77	.234	18	51
2B	Dick Green	144	475	116	.244	12	49
3B	Sal Bando	153	538	146	.271	24	74
SS	Bert Campaneris	134	569	143	.251	5	47
LF	Joe Rudi	127	513	137	.267	10	52
CF	Rick Monday	116	355	87	.245	18	56
RF	Reggie Jackson	150	567	157	.277	32	80

==== Other batters ====
Note: G = Games played; AB = At bats; H = Hits; Avg. = Batting average; HR = Home runs; RBI = Runs batted in

Player	G	AB	H	Avg.	HR	RBI
Ángel Mangual	94	287	82	.286	4	30
Tommy Davis	79	219	71	.324	3	42
Larry Brown	70	189	37	.196	1	9
Gene Tenace	65	179	49	.274	7	25
George Hendrick	42	114	27	.237	0	8
Curt Blefary	50	101	22	.218	5	12
Don Mincher	28	98	22	.239	2	8
Mike Hegan	65	55	13	.236	0	3
Dwain Anderson	16	37	10	.270	0	3
Steve Hovley	24	27	3	.111	0	3
Adrian Garrett	14	21	3	.143	1	2
Frank Fernández	4	9	1	.111	0	1
Felipe Alou	2	8	2	.250	0	0
Tony LaRussa	23	8	0	.000	0	0
Ramon Webster	7	5	0	.000	0	0
Ron Clark	2	2	0	.000	0	0

=== Pitching ===
==== Starting pitchers ====
Note: G = Games pitched; IP = Innings pitched; W = Wins; L = Losses; ERA = Earned run average; SO = Strikeouts

Player	G	IP	W	L	ERA	SO
Vida Blue	39	312.0	24	8	1.82	301
Catfish Hunter	37	273.2	21	11	2.96	181
Chuck Dobson	30	189.0	15	5	3.81	100
Diego Seguí	26	146.1	10	8	3.14	81
Blue Moon Odom	25	140.2	10	12	4.29	69

==== Other pitchers ====
Note: G = Games pitched; IP = Innings pitched; W = Wins; L = Losses; ERA = Earned run average; SO = Strikeouts

Player	G	IP	W	L	ERA	SO
Rob Gardner	4	7.2	0	0	2.35	5

==== Relief pitchers ====
Note: G = Games pitched; W = Wins; L = Losses; SV = Saves; ERA = Earned run average; SO = Strikeouts

Player	G	W	L	SV	ERA	SO
Rollie Fingers	48	4	6	17	2.99	98
Bob Locker	47	7	2	6	2.86	46
Darold Knowles	43	5	2	7	3.59	40
Jim Roland	31	1	3	1	3.18	30
Ron Klimkowski	26	2	2	2	3.38	25
Mudcat Grant	15	1	0	3	1.98	13
Paul Lindblad	8	1	0	0	3.94	4
Daryl Patterson	4	0	0	0	7.94	2
Jim Panther	4	0	1	0	11.12	4
Marcel Lachemann	1	0	0	0	54.00	0

== Awards and honors ==
- Vida Blue, P, American League Cy Young Award
- Vida Blue, P, American League Most Valuable Player Award. Sal Bando, second in American League MVP voting
- Dick Williams, Associated Press AL Manager of the Year

=== All-Stars ===
1971 Major League Baseball All-Star Game

- Vida Blue, pitcher, starter
- Dave Duncan, reserve
- Reggie Jackson, reserve

== 1971 American League Championship Series ==
=== Game 1 ===
Sunday, October 3, 1971, at Memorial Stadium in Baltimore, Maryland

Team	1	2	3	4	5	6	7	8	9	R	H	E
Oakland	0	2	0	1	0	0	0	0	0	3	9	0
Baltimore	0	0	0	1	0	0	4	0	X	5	7	1
WP: Dave McNally (1–0) LP: Vida Blue (0–1) Sv: Eddie Watt (1)

=== Game 2 ===
Monday, October 4, 1971, at Memorial Stadium in Baltimore, Maryland

Team	1	2	3	4	5	6	7	8	9	R	H	E
Oakland	0	0	0	1	0	0	0	0	0	1	6	0
Baltimore	0	1	1	0	0	0	1	2	X	5	7	0
WP: Mike Cuellar (1–0) LP: Catfish Hunter (0–1); Home runs: OAK: None; BAL: Brooks Robinson (1), Boog Powell 2 (2), Elrod Hendricks (1)

=== Game 3 ===
Tuesday, October 5, 1971, at Oakland-Alameda County Coliseum in Oakland, California

Team	1	2	3	4	5	6	7	8	9	R	H	E
Baltimore	1	0	0	0	2	0	2	0	0	5	12	0
Oakland	0	0	1	0	0	1	0	1	0	3	7	0
WP: Jim Palmer (1–0) LP: Diego Seguí (0–1); Home runs: BAL: None; OAK: Reggie Jackson 2 (2), Sal Bando (1)

== Farm system ==
Level	Team	League	Manager
AAA	Iowa Oaks	American Association	Sherm Lollar
AA	Birmingham A's	Southern League	Phil Cavarretta
A	Burlington Bees	Midwest League	Harry Bright
A-Short Season	Coos Bay-North Bend A's	Northwest League	Jim Reinebold
