= 1971 Baltimore Orioles season =

Major League Baseball season

1971 Baltimore Orioles
- American League champions American League East champions
- League: American League
- Division: East
- Ballpark: Memorial Stadium
- City: Baltimore, Maryland
- Record: 101–57 (.639)
- Divisional place: 1st
- Owners: Jerold Hoffberger
- General managers: Harry Dalton
- Managers: Earl Weaver
- Television: WJZ-TV
- Radio: WBAL (AM) (Chuck Thompson, John Gordon, Bill O'Donnell)

The 1971 Baltimore Orioles season finished first in the American League East, with a record of 101 wins and 57 losses. They returned to the World Series for the third consecutive season, but were defeated by the Pittsburgh Pirates in seven games at home. As of 2026, the 1971 Orioles are one of only two Major League Baseball clubs (the 1920 Chicago White Sox being the other) to have four 20-game winners in a season: Jim Palmer, Dave McNally, Mike Cuellar, and Pat Dobson.

== Offseason ==
- December 16, 1970: Roger Freed was traded by the Orioles to the Philadelphia Phillies for Grant Jackson, Jim Hutto and Sam Parrilla

== Regular season ==
=== Season standings ===
AL East
Team	W	L	Pct.	GB	Home	Road
Baltimore Orioles	101	57	.639	—	53‍–‍24	48‍–‍33
Detroit Tigers	91	71	.562	12	54‍–‍27	37‍–‍44
Boston Red Sox	85	77	.525	18	47‍–‍33	38‍–‍44
New York Yankees	82	80	.506	21	44‍–‍37	38‍–‍43
Washington Senators	63	96	.396	38½	35‍–‍46	28‍–‍50
Cleveland Indians	60	102	.370	43	29‍–‍52	31‍–‍50

=== Record vs. opponents ===
1971 American League record Sources:
Team	BAL	BOS	CAL	CWS	CLE	DET	KC	MIL	MIN	NYY	OAK	WAS
Baltimore	—	9–9	7–5	8–4	13–5	8–10	6–5	9–3	10–2	11–7	7–4	13–3
Boston	9–9	—	6–6	10–2	11–7	12–6	1–11	6–6	8–4	7–11	3–9	12–6
California	5–7	6–6	—	8–10	8–4	6–6	8–10	6–12	12–6	6–6	7–11	4–8
Chicago	4–8	2–10	10–8	—	3–9	7–5	9–9	11–7	7–11	5–7	11–7	10–2
Cleveland	5–13	7–11	4–8	9–3	—	6–12	2–10	4–8	4–8	8–10	4–8	7–11
Detroit	10–8	6–12	6–6	5–7	12–6	—	8–4	10–2	6–6	10–8	4–8	14–4
Kansas City	5–6	11–1	10–8	9–9	10–2	4–8	—	8–10	9–9	5–7	5–13	9–3
Milwaukee	3–9	6–6	12–6	7–11	8–4	2–10	10–8	—	10–7	2–10	3–15	6–6
Minnesota	2–10	4–8	6–12	11–7	8–4	6–6	9–9	7–10	—	8–4	8–10	5–6
New York	7–11	11–7	6–6	7–5	10–8	8–10	7–5	10–2	4–8	—	5–7	7–11
Oakland	4–7	9–3	11–7	7–11	8–4	8–4	13–5	15–3	10–8	7–5	—	9–3
Washington	3–13	6–12	8–4	2–10	11–7	4–14	3–9	6–6	6–5	11–7	3–9	—

=== Opening Day starters ===
- Mark Belanger (SS)
- Paul Blair (CF)
- Elrod Hendricks (C)
- Davey Johnson (2B)
- Dave McNally (P)
- Boog Powell (1B)
- Merv Rettenmund (LF)
- Brooks Robinson (3B)
- Frank Robinson (RF)

=== Notable transactions ===
- May 28, 1971: Jim Hardin was traded by the Orioles to the New York Yankees for Bill Burbach.
- May 28, 1971: Dave Boswell was signed as a free agent by the Orioles.

==== Draft picks ====
- June 8, 1971: 1971 Major League Baseball draft
  - Randy Stein was drafted by the Orioles in the 1st round (23rd pick).
  - Kiko Garcia was drafted by the Orioles in the 3rd round. Player signed June 27, 1971.

=== Roster ===
1971 Baltimore Orioles
Roster
Pitchers: 32 Dave Boswell; 35 Mike Cuellar; 37 Pat Dobson; 36 Tom Dukes; 29 Dick Hall; 44 Jim Hardin; 23 Grant Jackson; 40 Dave Leonhard; 19 Dave McNally; 22 Jim Palmer; 27 Orlando Peña; 24 Pete Richert; 39 Eddie Watt	Catchers: 3 Clay Dalrymple; 8 Andy Etchebarren; 10 Elrod Hendricks; Infielders: 7 Mark Belanger; 2 Jerry DaVanon; 16 Bobby Grich; 15 Davey Johnson; 26 Boog Powell; 5 Brooks Robinson; 30 Chico Salmon	Outfielders: 25 Don Baylor; 6 Paul Blair; 9 Don Buford; 11 Terry Crowley; 21 Curt Motton; 14 Merv Rettenmund; 20 Frank Robinson; 28 Tom Shopay	Manager: 4 Earl Weaver; Coaches: 31 George Bamberger; 41 Jim Frey; 55 Billy Hunter; 48 George Staller

== Player stats ==
= Indicates team leader

=== Batting ===
==== Starters by position ====
Note: Pos = Position; G = Games played; AB = At bats; H = Hits; Avg. = Batting average; HR = Home runs; RBI = Runs batted in

Pos	Player	G	AB	H	Avg.	HR	RBI
C	Elrod Hendricks	101	316	79	.250	9	42
1B	Boog Powell	128	418	107	.256	22	92
2B	Davey Johnson	142	510	144	.282	18	72
3B	Brooks Robinson	156	589	160	.272	20	92
SS	Mark Belanger	150	500	133	.266	0	35
LF	Don Buford	122	449	130	.290	19	54
CF	Paul Blair	141	516	135	.262	10	44
RF	Frank Robinson	133	455	128	.281	28	99

==== Other batters ====
Note: G = Games played; AB = At bats; H = Hits; Avg. = Batting average; HR = Home runs; RBI = Runs batted in

Player	G	AB	H	Avg.	HR	RBI
Merv Rettenmund	141	491	156	.318	11	75
Andy Etchebarren	70	222	60	.270	9	29
Chico Salmon	42	84	15	.179	2	7
Jerry DaVanon	38	81	19	.235	0	4
Tom Shopay	47	74	19	.257	0	5
Curt Motton	38	53	10	.189	4	8
Clay Dalrymple	23	49	10	.204	1	6
Bobby Grich	7	30	9	.300	1	6
Terry Crowley	18	23	4	.174	0	1
Don Baylor	1	2	0	.000	0	1

=== Pitching ===
==== Starting pitchers ====
Note: G = Games pitched; IP = Innings pitched; W = Wins; L = Losses; ERA = Earned run average; SO = Strikeouts

Player	G	IP	W	L	ERA	SO
Mike Cuellar	38	292.1	20	9	3.08	124
Pat Dobson	38	282.1	20	8	2.90	187
Jim Palmer	37	282.0	20	9	2.68	184
Dave McNally	30	224.1	21	5	2.89	91

==== Other pitchers ====
Note: G = Games pitched; IP = Innings pitched; W = Wins; L = Losses; ERA = Earned run average; SO = Strikeouts

Player	G	IP	W	L	ERA	SO
Grant Jackson	29	77.2	4	3	3.13	51
Dave Leonhard	12	54.0	2	3	2.83	18

==== Relief pitchers ====
Note: G = Games pitched; IP = Innings pitched; W = Wins; L = Losses; SV = Saves; ERA = Earned run average; SO = Strikeouts

Player	G	IP	W	L	SV	ERA	SO
Eddie Watt	35	39.2	3	1	11	1.82	26
Pete Richert	35	36.1	3	5	4	3.47	35
Tom Dukes	28	38.1	1	5	4	3.52	30
Dick Hall	27	43.1	6	6	1	4.98	26
Dave Boswell	16	24.2	1	2	0	4.38	14
Jim Hardin	6	5.2	0	0	0	4.76	3
Orlando Peña	5	14.2	0	1	0	3.07	4

== Postseason ==
=== ALCS ===
Baltimore Orioles defeat the Oakland Athletics, 3–0

Game	Score	Date	Location	Attendance
1	Oakland – 3, Baltimore – 5	October 3	Memorial Stadium	42,641
2	Oakland – 1, Baltimore – 5	October 4	Memorial Stadium	35,003
3	Baltimore – 5, Oakland – 3	October 5	Oakland Coliseum	33,176

=== World Series ===
NL Pittsburgh Pirates (4) vs. AL Baltimore Orioles (3)

Game	Score	Date	Location	Attendance	Time of Game
1	Pirates – 3, Orioles – 5	October 9	Memorial Stadium	53,229	2:06
2	Pirates – 3, Orioles – 11	October 11	Memorial Stadium	53,239	2:55
3	Orioles – 1, Pirates – 5	October 12	Three Rivers Stadium	50,403	2:20
4	Orioles – 3, Pirates – 4	October 13	Three Rivers Stadium	51,378	2:48
5	Orioles – 0, Pirates – 4	October 14	Three Rivers Stadium	51,377	2:16
6	Pirates – 2, Orioles – 3 (10 inns)	October 16	Memorial Stadium	44,174	2:59
7	Pirates – 2, Orioles – 1	October 17	Memorial Stadium	47,291	2:10

== Farm system ==
Level	Team	League	Manager
AAA	Rochester Red Wings	International League	Joe Altobelli
AA	Dallas-Fort Worth Spurs	Texas League	Cal Ripken Sr.
A	Stockton Ports	California League	Ray Malgradi
A	Miami Orioles	Florida State League	Woody Smith
A-Short Season	Aberdeen Pheasants	Northern League	Ken Rowe
Rookie	Bluefield Orioles	Appalachian League	Jimmie Schaffer

LEAGUE CHAMPIONS: Rochester, Miami, Bluefield

== Japan tour ==
Three days after the conclusion of the World Series, the Orioles embarked on a tour of Japan to play 18 games against Nippon Professional Baseball competition beginning on October 23. The team had accepted the invitation to participate in the Yomiuri Shimbun-sponsored event at the start of the calendar year on January 1. Included in the 12–2–4 overall record was the Orioles going undefeated at 8–0–3 in head-to-head competition against the Yomiuri Giants which was owned by the tour's sponsor and had recently captured its seventh consecutive Japan Series championship.

The Japanese point of view of high hopes entering the exhibitions and the disappointment with the unfavorably lopsided results is chronicled in Robert Whiting's 1977 book The Chrysanthemum and the Bat.

Game	Month	Date	Day	Place	Opponent	W/L/D	Score	Orioles Pitcher of Record	Notes
1	OCT	23	SA	Tokyo	Yomiuri Giants	W	8–4	Jim Palmer	
2	OCT	24	SU	Tokyo	Yomiuri Giants	W	8–2	Mike Cuellar	
3	OCT	27	W	Sendai	Yomiuri Giants	W	10–1	Pat Dobson	Dobson three-hitter; two triples and four RBI for Mark Belanger.
4	OCT	28	TH	Kōriyama	Yomiuri Giants	D	3–3 (10)	–	
5	OCT	31	SU	Osaka	Japan All-Stars	W	4–1	Mike Cuellar	
6	NOV	1	M	Nishinomiya	Yomiuri Giants/Nankai Hawks	W	2–0	Dave McNally	Scheduled OCT 30 (rain); consecutive homers by Brooks Robinson and Davey Johnson in the fifth.
7	NOV	2	TU	Toyama	Yomiuri Giants	W	2–0	Pat Dobson	Dobson pitches a no-hit, no-run game.
8	NOV	3	W	Tokyo	Japan All-Stars	W	7–0	Jim Palmer	
9	NOV	5	F	Niigata	Yomiuri Giants	D	4–4 (10)	–	
10	NOV	6	SA	Tokyo	Yomiuri Giants	D	9–9 (10)	–	
11	NOV	7	SU	Tokyo	Yomiuri Giants	W	7–0 (5)	Pat Dobson	Game abbreviated by rain.
12	NOV	9	TU	Kyoto	Yomiuri Giants/Hankyu Braves	L	2–8	Jim Palmer	Palmer loses to Hisashi Yamada in a duel between two 20-game winners.
13	NOV	10	W	Hiroshima	Yomiuri Giants/Hiroshima Toyo Carp	W	4–2	Mike Cuellar	
14	NOV	11	TH	Matsuyama	Yomiuri Giants	W	2–0 (11)	Eddie Watt	
15	NOV	13	SA	Fukuoka	Yomiuri Giants/Nishitetsu Lions	D	9–9 (10)	–	
16	NOV	14	SU	Kitakyushu	Yomiuri Giants	W	8–7	Pete Richert	
17	NOV	16	TU	Nagoya	Yomiuri Giants/Chunichi Dragons	L	1–9	Grant Jackson	
18	NOV	20	SA	Tokyo	Yomiuri Giants	W	5–0	Tom Dukes	Scheduled OCT 26 in Sapporo, then NOV 18 in Tokyo (rain both times).

Source: Baltimore Orioles 1972 Media Guide (scroll down to pages 25 and 26).

== Bibliography ==
- Johnson, Lloyd; Wolff, Miles, eds. (1997). The Encyclopedia of Minor League Baseball (2nd ed.). Durham, North Carolina: Baseball America. ISBN 978-0-9637189-8-3.
