= 1971 Major League Baseball season =

1971 MLB season
- League: American League (AL); National League (NL)
- Sport: Baseball
- Duration: Regular season: April 5 – September 30, 1971; Postseason: October 2–17, 1971
- Games: 162
- Teams: 24 (12 per league)
- TV partner: NBC

Draft
- Top draft pick: Danny Goodwin
- Picked by: Chicago White Sox

Regular season
- Season MVP: AL: Vida Blue (OAK); NL: Joe Torre (STL)

Postseason
- AL champions: Baltimore Orioles
- AL runners-up: Oakland Athletics
- NL champions: Pittsburgh Pirates
- NL runners-up: San Francisco Giants

World Series
- Champions: Pittsburgh Pirates
- Runners-up: Baltimore Orioles
- World Series MVP: Roberto Clemente (PIT)

MLB seasons
- ← 1970 1972 →

Locations of teams for the 1970–1971 American League seasons
West East
Locations of teams for the 1971–1976 National League seasons
West East

The 1971 major league baseball season began on April 5, 1971, while the regular season ended on September 30. The postseason began on October 2. The 68th World Series began with Game 1 on October 9 and ended with Game 7 on October 17, with the Pittsburgh Pirates of the National League defeating the Baltimore Orioles of the American League, four games to three, capturing their fourth championship in franchise history and first since 1960. The Orioles won their third consecutive pennant (ALCS) in 1971 and were the defending World Series champions.

The 42nd All-Star Game was held on July 13 at Tiger Stadium in Detroit, Michigan, home of the Detroit Tigers. The American League won 6–4 for their first victory in nine years, since the second game of 1962, and their last until 1983.

This was the final year for the Washington Senators in Washington, D.C.; they relocated to Texas after the season, to the Dallas–Fort Worth metroplex city of Arlington, and became the Texas Rangers. Washington went without a major league team for 33 seasons until the Montreal Expos relocated there as the Washington Nationals in 2005.

This was the final season the majority of MLB teams wore wool flannel uniforms. The Pirates and Cardinals wore double knit uniforms of nylon and rayon throughout 1971, and the Orioles gradually phased out flannels, going all-double knit in time for the ALCS. By 1973, flannel uniforms completely disappeared from the MLB scene.

== Schedule ==
The 1971 schedule consisted of 162 games for all teams in the American League and National League, each of which had 12 teams. Each league was split into two six-team divisions. Each team was scheduled to play 18 games against their five division rivals, totaling 90 games, and 12 games against six interdivision opponents, totaling 72 games. This continued the format put in place since the 1969 and would be used until 1977 in the American League and 1993 in the National League.

Opening Day took place on April 5, featuring six teams. The final day of the regular season was on September 30, featuring 18 teams. The National League Championship Series took place between October 2 and October 6, while the American League Championship Series took place between October 3 and October 5. The World Series took place between October 9 and October 17.

== Rule changes ==
The 1971 season saw the following rule changes:

- Players on the current hitting team are now required to wear a batting helmet. Players who previously used a cap liner in 1970 could continue to do so.
- Rules regarding players interacting with fans were relaxed, as previously, players could not talk or give autographs once batting practice started. Now, players could interact with players up to 30 minutes before the start of a game.
- Rule 5.09B was amended to prohibit baserunners from advancing if the home-plate umpire interfered with a catcher.
- The disabled list was expanded. Previously, a team could have as many as three players disabled at a time — two for 21 days and one for 60. Now, a team could also disable a nonpitcher for 15 days, making it permissible to have a total of four at a time.

== Teams ==
League	Division	Team	City	Ballpark	Capacity	Manager
American League	East	Baltimore Orioles	Baltimore, Maryland	Baltimore Memorial Stadium	53,208	Earl Weaver
American League	East	Boston Red Sox	Boston, Massachusetts	Fenway Park	33,368	Eddie Kasko
American League	East	Cleveland Indians	Cleveland, Ohio	Cleveland Stadium	74,483	Alvin Dark
American League	East	Cleveland Indians	Cleveland, Ohio	Cleveland Stadium	74,483	Johnny Lipon
American League	East	Detroit Tigers	Detroit, Michigan	Tiger Stadium	52,806	Billy Martin
American League	East	New York Yankees	New York, New York	Yankee Stadium	65,010	Ralph Houk
American League	East	Washington Senators	Washington, D.C.	Robert F. Kennedy Memorial Stadium	45,016	Ted Williams
American League	West	California Angels	Anaheim, California	Anaheim Stadium	43,500	Lefty Phillips
American League	West	Chicago White Sox	Chicago, Illinois	White Sox Park	44,492	Chuck Tanner
American League	West	Kansas City Royals	Kansas City, Missouri	Municipal Stadium	35,561	Bob Lemon
American League	West	Milwaukee Brewers	Milwaukee, Wisconsin	Milwaukee County Stadium	53,192	Dave Bristol
American League	West	Minnesota Twins	Bloomington, Minnesota	Metropolitan Stadium	45,919	Bill Rigney
American League	West	Oakland Athletics	Oakland, California	Oakland–Alameda County Coliseum	50,000	Dick Williams
National League	East	Chicago Cubs	Chicago, Illinois	Wrigley Field	36,755	Leo Durocher
National League	East	Montreal Expos	Montreal, Quebec	Jarry Park Stadium	29,125	Gene Mauch
National League	East	New York Mets	New York, New York	Shea Stadium	55,300	Gil Hodges
National League	East	Philadelphia Phillies	Philadelphia, Pennsylvania	Veterans Stadium	56,371	Frank Lucchesi
National League	East	Pittsburgh Pirates	Pittsburgh, Pennsylvania	Three Rivers Stadium	58,722	Danny Murtaugh
National League	East	St. Louis Cardinals	St. Louis, Missouri	Civic Center Busch Memorial Stadium	53,138	Red Schoendienst
National League	West	Atlanta Braves	Atlanta, Georgia	Atlanta Stadium	51,383	Lum Harris
National League	West	Cincinnati Reds	Cincinnati, Ohio	Riverfront Stadium	52,953	Sparky Anderson
National League	West	Houston Astros	Houston, Texas	Houston Astrodome	47,000	Harry Walker
National League	West	Los Angeles Dodgers	Los Angeles, California	Dodger Stadium	56,000	Walter Alston
National League	West	San Diego Padres	San Diego, California	San Diego Stadium	50,000	Preston Gómez
National League	West	San Francisco Giants	San Francisco, California	Candlestick Park	58,945	Charlie Fox

== Standings ==
=== American League ===
AL East
Team	W	L	Pct.	GB	Home	Road
Baltimore Orioles	101	57	.639	—	53‍–‍24	48‍–‍33
Detroit Tigers	91	71	.562	12	54‍–‍27	37‍–‍44
Boston Red Sox	85	77	.525	18	47‍–‍33	38‍–‍44
New York Yankees	82	80	.506	21	44‍–‍37	38‍–‍43
Washington Senators	63	96	.396	38½	35‍–‍46	28‍–‍50
Cleveland Indians	60	102	.370	43	29‍–‍52	31‍–‍50

AL West
Team	W	L	Pct.	GB	Home	Road
Oakland Athletics	101	60	.627	—	46‍–‍35	55‍–‍25
Kansas City Royals	85	76	.528	16	44‍–‍37	41‍–‍39
Chicago White Sox	79	83	.488	22½	39‍–‍42	40‍–‍41
California Angels	76	86	.469	25½	35‍–‍46	41‍–‍40
Minnesota Twins	74	86	.463	26½	37‍–‍42	37‍–‍44
Milwaukee Brewers	69	92	.429	32	34‍–‍48	35‍–‍44

=== National League ===
NL East
Team	W	L	Pct.	GB	Home	Road
Pittsburgh Pirates	97	65	.599	—	52‍–‍28	45‍–‍37
St. Louis Cardinals	90	72	.556	7	45‍–‍36	45‍–‍36
Chicago Cubs	83	79	.512	14	44‍–‍37	39‍–‍42
New York Mets	83	79	.512	14	44‍–‍37	39‍–‍42
Montreal Expos	71	90	.441	25½	36‍–‍44	35‍–‍46
Philadelphia Phillies	67	95	.414	30	34‍–‍47	33‍–‍48

NL West
Team	W	L	Pct.	GB	Home	Road
San Francisco Giants	90	72	.556	—	51‍–‍30	39‍–‍42
Los Angeles Dodgers	89	73	.549	1	42‍–‍39	47‍–‍34
Atlanta Braves	82	80	.506	8	43‍–‍39	39‍–‍41
Cincinnati Reds	79	83	.488	11	46‍–‍35	33‍–‍48
Houston Astros	79	83	.488	11	39‍–‍42	40‍–‍41
San Diego Padres	61	100	.379	28½	33‍–‍48	28‍–‍52

=== Tie game ===
1 tie game (0 in AL, 1 in NL), which is not factored into winning percentage or games behind (and was replayed again) occurred during the season.

==== National League ====
- May 1, St. Louis Cardinals vs. Montreal Expos, tied at 2 after a shortened seven innings due to rain.

== Postseason ==
The postseason began on October 2 and ended on October 17 with the Pittsburgh Pirates defeating the Baltimore Orioles in the 1971 World Series in seven games.

=== Bracket ===
League Championship Series (ALCS, NLCS)
East	Baltimore	3
West	Oakland	0
East	Pittsburgh	3
West	San Francisco	1

World Series
AL	Baltimore	3
NL	Pittsburgh	4

== Managerial changes ==
=== Off-season ===
Team	Former Manager	New Manager
Detroit Tigers	Mayo Smith	Billy Martin
Oakland Athletics	John McNamara	Dick Williams

=== In-season ===
Team	Former Manager	New Manager
Cleveland Indians	Alvin Dark	Johnny Lipon

== League leaders ==
=== American League ===
Hitting leaders
Stat	Player	Total
AVG	Tony Oliva (MIN)	.337
OPS	Bobby Murcer (NYY)	.969
HR	Bill Melton (CWS)	33
RBI	Harmon Killebrew (MIN)	119
R	Don Buford (BAL)	99
H	César Tovar (MIN)	204
SB	Amos Otis (KC)	52

Pitching leaders
Stat	Player	Total
W	Mickey Lolich (DET)	25
L	Denny McLain (WAS)	22
ERA	Vida Blue (OAK)	1.82
K	Mickey Lolich (DET)	308
IP	Mickey Lolich (DET)	376.0
SV	Ken Sanders (MIL)	31
WHIP	Vida Blue (OAK)	0.952

=== National League ===
Hitting leaders
Stat	Player	Total
AVG	Joe Torre (STL)	.363
OPS	Hank Aaron (ATL)	1.079
HR	Willie Stargell (PIT)	48
RBI	Joe Torre (STL)	137
R	Lou Brock (STL)	126
H	Joe Torre (STL)	230
SB	Lou Brock (STL)	64

Pitching leaders
Stat	Player	Total
W	Ferguson Jenkins (CHC)	24
L	Steve Arlin (SD)	19
ERA	Tom Seaver (NYM)	1.76
K	Tom Seaver (NYM)	289
IP	Ferguson Jenkins (CHC)	325.0
SV	Dave Giusti (PIT)	30
WHIP	Tom Seaver (NYM)	0.946

== Regular season recap ==
Three of the four division races were anticlimactic; the only race was in the NL West between old rivals Los Angeles Dodgers and San Francisco Giants. The Giants led by 8.5 games on September 1 but the Dodgers chipped away. In mid September, the Dodgers won 8 in a row, including 5 over the Giants to narrow the gap to one game. But they could get no closer; ultimately both teams won on the final day of the season and the Giants won the division by 1 game.

== Milestones ==
=== Batters ===
==== Cycles ====
- Freddie Patek (KC):
  - Patek hit for his first cycle and first in franchise history, on July 9 against the Minnesota Twins.

==== Other batting accomplishments ====
- Willie Mays (SF):
  - Became the first player to hit a home run in each of his four games of a season, when he hits his fourth home run of the season against the St. Louis Cardinals on April 10.
  - Broke the National League record for most career runs scored previously set by Stan Musial in 1963 who had 1,949 runs scored with a home run against the Montreal Expos on May 30.
- Hank Aaron (ATL):
  - Became the third player in Major League history to hit 600 home runs in the third inning against the San Francisco Giants on April 27.
- Harmon Killebrew (MIN):
  - Became the 10th player in Major League history to hit 500 home runs in the first inning against the Baltimore Orioles on August 10.
- Frank Robinson (BAL):
  - Became the 11th player in Major League history to hit 500 home runs in the ninth inning in game two of a doubleheader against the Detroit Tigers on September 13.
- Lou Brock (STL):
  - Recorded his 500th career stolen base in the first inning against the Montreal Expos on September 18. He became the 21st player to reach this mark.

=== Pitchers ===
==== No-hitters ====
- Ken Holtzman (CHC):
  - Holtzman threw his second career no-hitter and 10th no-hitter in franchise history, by defeating the Cincinnati Reds 1–0 on June 3. He walked four and struck out six.
- Rick Wise (PHI):
  - Wise threw his first career no-hitter and sixth no-hitter in franchise history, by defeating the Cincinnati Reds 4–0 on June 23. He walked one and struck out three.
- Bob Gibson (STL):
  - Gibson threw his first career no-hitter and sixth no-hitter in franchise history, by defeating the Pittsburgh Pirates 11–0 on August 14. He walked three and struck out 10.

=== Miscellaneous ===
- Oakland Athletics / California Angels:
  - Play the longest shutout in American League history, when the Athletics defeat the Angels 1–0 in the 20th inning.

== Awards and honors ==
=== Regular season ===
Baseball Writers' Association of America Awards
BBWAA Award	National League	American League
Rookie of the Year	Earl Williams (ATL)	Chris Chambliss (CLE)
Cy Young Award	Ferguson Jenkins (CHC)	Vida Blue (OAK)
Most Valuable Player	Joe Torre (STL)	Vida Blue (OAK)
Babe Ruth Award (World Series MVP)	Roberto Clemente (PIT)	—
Gold Glove Awards
Position	National League	American League
Pitcher	Bob Gibson (STL)	Jim Kaat (MIN)
Catcher	Johnny Bench (CIN)	Ray Fosse (CLE)
1st Base	Wes Parker (LAD)	George Scott (BOS)
2nd Base	Tommy Helms (CIN)	Davey Johnson (BAL)
3rd Base	Doug Rader (HOU)	Brooks Robinson (BAL)
Shortstop	Bud Harrelson (NYM)	Mark Belanger (BAL)
Outfield	Bobby Bonds (SF)	Paul Blair (BAL)
Outfield	Roberto Clemente (PIT)	Amos Otis (KC)
Outfield	Willie Davis (LAD)	Carl Yastrzemski (BOS)

=== Other awards ===
- Commissioner's Award (Humanitarian): Willie Mays (SF)
- Hutch Award: Joe Torre (STL)
- Sport Magazine's World Series Most Valuable Player Award: Roberto Clemente (PIT)

The Sporting News Awards
Award	National League	American League
Player of the Year	Joe Torre (STL)	—
Pitcher of the Year	Ferguson Jenkins (CHC)	Vida Blue (OAK)
Fireman of the Year (Relief pitcher)	Dave Giusti (PIT)	Ken Sanders (MIL)
Rookie Player of the Year	Earl Williams (ATL)	Chris Chambliss (CLE)
Rookie Pitcher of the Year	Reggie Cleveland (STL)	Bill Parsons (MIL)
Comeback Player of the Year	Al Downing (LAD)	Norm Cash (DET)
Manager of the Year	Charlie Fox (SF)	—
Executive of the Year	—	Cedric Tallis (KC)

=== Monthly awards ===
==== Player of the Month ====
Month	National League
April	Willie Stargell (PIT)
May	Lou Brock (STL)
June	Willie Stargell (PIT)
July	Ferguson Jenkins (CHC)
August	Joe Torre (STL)

=== Baseball Hall of Fame ===
- Dave Bancroft
- Jake Beckley
- Chick Hafey
- Harry Hooper
- Joe Kelley
- Rube Marquard
- Satchel Paige
- George Weiss (executive)

== Home field attendance ==
Team name	Wins	%±	Home attendance	%±	Per game
New York Mets	83	0.0%	2,266,680	−16.0%	27,984
Los Angeles Dodgers	89	2.3%	2,064,594	21.7%	25,489
Boston Red Sox	85	−2.3%	1,678,732	5.2%	20,984
Chicago Cubs	83	−1.2%	1,653,007	0.6%	20,407
St. Louis Cardinals	90	18.4%	1,604,671	−1.5%	19,569
Detroit Tigers	91	15.2%	1,591,073	6.0%	19,643
Philadelphia Phillies	67	−8.2%	1,511,223	113.4%	18,657
Pittsburgh Pirates	97	9.0%	1,501,132	11.9%	18,764
Cincinnati Reds	79	−22.5%	1,501,122	−16.8%	18,532
Montreal Expos	71	−2.7%	1,290,963	−9.4%	16,137
Houston Astros	79	0.0%	1,261,589	0.6%	15,575
San Francisco Giants	90	4.7%	1,106,043	49.3%	13,655
New York Yankees	82	−11.8%	1,070,771	−5.8%	13,219
Baltimore Orioles	101	−6.5%	1,023,037	−3.2%	13,286
Atlanta Braves	82	7.9%	1,006,320	−6.7%	12,272
Minnesota Twins	74	−24.5%	940,858	−25.4%	11,910
California Angels	76	−11.6%	926,373	−14.0%	11,437
Oakland Athletics	101	13.5%	914,993	17.6%	11,296
Kansas City Royals	85	30.8%	910,784	31.4%	11,244
Chicago White Sox	79	41.1%	833,891	68.3%	10,295
Milwaukee Brewers	69	6.2%	731,531	−21.7%	8,921
Washington Senators	63	−10.0%	655,156	−20.6%	8,088
Cleveland Indians	60	−21.1%	591,361	−19.0%	7,301
San Diego Padres	61	−3.2%	557,513	−13.4%	6,883

== Venues ==
The Philadelphia Phillies leave Connie Mack Stadium from which they played 33 seasons and opened Veterans Stadium (with the NFL's Philadelphia Eagles), where they would go on to play for 33 seasons through 2003.

The Washington Senators would play their final game at Robert F. Kennedy Memorial Stadium on September 30 against the New York Yankees, relocating to Arlington, Texas at Arlington Stadium as the Texas Rangers for the start of the 1972 season. The game was even more notable in that, with the Senators leading the Yankees 7–5 in the top of the 9th inning with one out, fans proceeded to storm and vandalize the field, preventing the game from continuing. The Senators were forced to forfeit the game to the Yankees.

== Media ==
=== Television ===
NBC was the exclusive national TV broadcaster of MLB, airing the weekend Game of the Week, the All-Star Game, both League Championship Series, and the World Series.

== See also ==
- 1971 in baseball (Events, Births, Deaths)
- 1971 Nippon Professional Baseball season
