= Elrod Hendricks =

American baseball player (1940–2005)

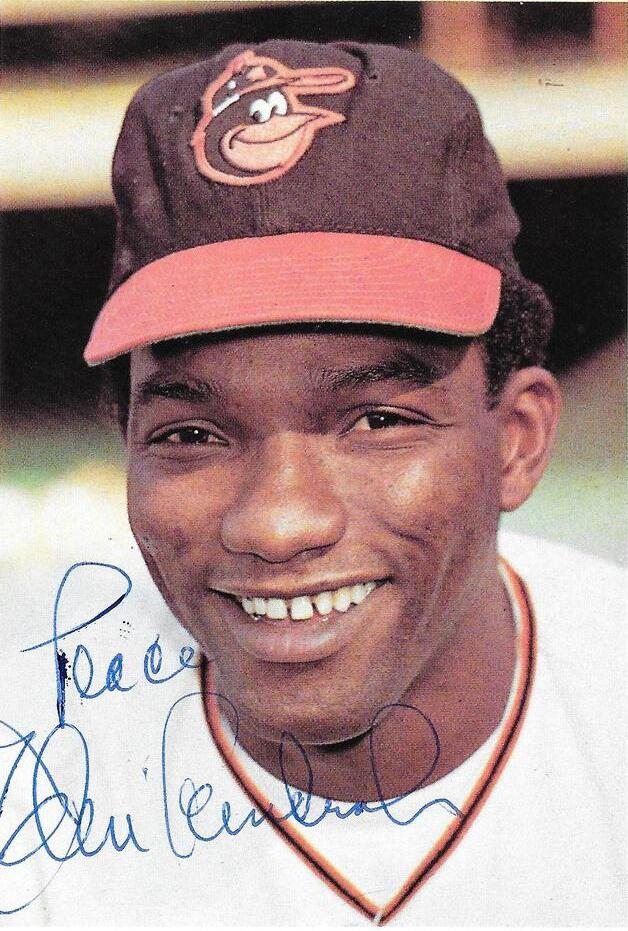
- Hendricks in 1972
- Catcher
- Born: December 22, 1940; Charlotte Amalie, United States Virgin Islands
- Died: December 21, 2005 (aged 64); Glen Burnie, Maryland, U.S.
- Batted: Left Threw: Right

MLB debut
- April 13, 1968, for the Baltimore Orioles

Last MLB appearance
- September 19, 1979, for the Baltimore Orioles

MLB statistics
- Batting average: .220
- Home runs: 62
- Runs batted in: 230
- Stats at Baseball Reference

Teams
- As player: Baltimore Orioles (1968–1972); Chicago Cubs (1972); Baltimore Orioles (1973–1976); New York Yankees (1976–1977); Baltimore Orioles (1978–1979); As coach: Baltimore Orioles (1978–2005)

Career highlights and awards
- 3× World Series champion (1970, 1977, 1983); Baltimore Orioles Hall of Fame

Elrod Gerome "Ellie" Hendricks (December 22, 1940 – December 21, 2005) was a U.S. Virgin Islander professional baseball player and coach. He played in Major League Baseball as a catcher from 1968 through 1979, primarily as a member of the Baltimore Orioles, where he contributed to three consecutive American League pennants from 1969 to 1971 and a World Series win in 1970. He also played for the Chicago Cubs (1972) and New York Yankees (1976–1977). In 2001, he was inducted into the Baltimore Orioles Hall of Fame.

== Biography ==
A native of Charlotte Amalie, United States Virgin Islands, Hendricks was selected by the Baltimore Orioles from the California Angels in the Rule 5 draft on November 28, 1967. He was regarded as a strong defensive catcher and effectively worked with Orioles pitchers such as Mike Cuellar, Pat Dobson, Dave McNally, Jim Palmer and Tom Phoebus.

Hendricks spent most of his playing career with the Orioles, regularly with the winning teams of manager Earl Weaver. They went to three consecutive World Series from 1969–71, as Hendricks shared catching duties with Andy Etchebarren. Hendricks led all American League catchers in fielding percentage in 1969 and 1975.

He was at bat in a pivotal play during the 1969 World Series. With the New York Mets leading 3–0 and two Orioles on base with two outs in the fourth inning of Game 3, Hendricks hit a line drive into the left-center field gap that most thought would go for extra bases, scoring two runs and putting the Orioles back in the game. But center fielder Tommie Agee, who was playing the left-handed Hendricks to pull in right-center, chased down the ball on a dead sprint, extending his left arm for a backhanded over-the-shoulder catch in the webbing of his glove.

His most productive season came in 1970 with the World Champion Orioles, when he hit 12 home runs with 41 runs batted in. Hendricks went 4-for-11 (.364), hit a solo home run in Game 1, decided Game 2 with a two-run opposite-field double and had four runs batted in to help Baltimore defeat the Cincinnati Reds in the 1970 World Series. He also appeared in the 1976 World Series for the Yankees against Cincinnati, returned to the Orioles as a bullpen coach following the 1977 season, and served as a player-coach in 1978 and 1979.

He was involved in the most controversial play of the 1970 World Series when the Cincinnati Reds were batting against the Orioles with one out and the score tied at three in the sixth inning of Game 1. With runners Tommy Helms at first base and Bernie Carbo at third, pinch hitter Ty Cline hit a Baltimore chop off Jim Palmer who, while running towards home plate, immediately signaled to Hendricks that Carbo was trying to score from third. Hendricks fielded the ball barehanded, spun around to his left and lunged at an oncoming Carbo in an attempt to tag him out, but collided with umpire Ken Burkhart who, while positioning himself to judge whether the batted ball was fair, accidentally blocked the runner's path to the plate. Carbo slid around Burkhart on the outside but missed touching home plate. With his back to the play and after being knocked down, Burkhart ruled Carbo out even though Hendricks made the tag with his mitt while holding the ball in his bare hand. Having not been properly tagged out, Carbo unknowingly stepped on the plate as he was arguing, but the play was dead once Burkhart made his call. Hendricks also had tied the game at 3–3 with a solo home run one inning earlier in the fifth.

Hendricks also played briefly for the Chicago Cubs and New York Yankees, earning a World Series ring with the latter club in 1977. Playing for the Cubs on September 16, 1972, against the Mets at Wrigley Field, Hendricks received five bases on balls, equaling the league mark at that moment. He had been traded along with Ken Holtzman, Doyle Alexander, Grant Jackson and Jimmy Freeman from the Orioles to the Yankees for Rick Dempsey, Scott McGregor, Tippy Martinez, Rudy May and Dave Pagan at the trade deadline on June 15, 1976.

Hendricks made the only pitching appearance in his MLB career in a 24–10 loss to the Toronto Blue Jays at Exhibition Stadium on June 26, 1978. He was the second consecutive position player used as a relief pitcher after Larry Harlow when he entered the game with two outs and the Orioles losing 24–6 in the fifth inning. He allowed only a hit and a walk over 2 1/3 scoreless innings.

In 711 games played, including 658 with Baltimore, Hendricks was a .220 hitter with 62 home runs (still the all-time record for a United States Virgin Islands native) and 230 runs batted in. In nine postseason games, he had .273, 2 home runs, and 10 runs batted in. In 602 games as a catcher, Hendricks collected 2783 outs, 228 assists, 31 double plays, and committed 29 errors for a .990 fielding percentage.

Hendricks played 17 seasons with the Cangrejeros de Santurce in Puerto Rico. He occupies third place on the all-time list in homers with 105.

=== Coaching career ===
Hendricks became a fixture in Baltimore by holding the position of bullpen coach for 28 years, the longest coaching tenure in Orioles history. Hendricks was noted for consistently wearing shin guards in the Orioles bullpen, even when he wasn’t actually catching a potential relief pitcher.

His contract was not renewed for that position as of October 2005, in part because he had a mild stroke in April. The 2005 season marked the 37th that Hendricks served in a Baltimore uniform as a player or coach, another club record. He also had the longest active coaching streak with one club among all major league coaches.

Following the 2005 season, Hendricks was set to be reassigned to another position within the organization based on his popularity within the Baltimore community. He frequently signed autographs prior to the games along with his loyalty to the "Oriole Way".

He was slated to be the host for the 2006 Baltimore Baseball Cruise aboard The Golden Princess.

=== Death ===
Hendricks died of a heart attack on December 21, 2005, in Glen Burnie, Maryland, one day shy of his 65th birthday.

The Orioles wore the number 44 on the sleeves of their jerseys in 2006, to honor Hendricks. Although the number has not been officially retired, no Oriole player has worn it since Hendricks died.

In 2007, St. Frances Academy in Baltimore started an annual baseball tournament in his name.

Sporting positions
Preceded by Cal Ripken Sr.	Baltimore Orioles Bullpen Coach; 1978–2005	Succeeded by Rick Dempsey
