= Dave McNally =

American baseball player (1942–2002)

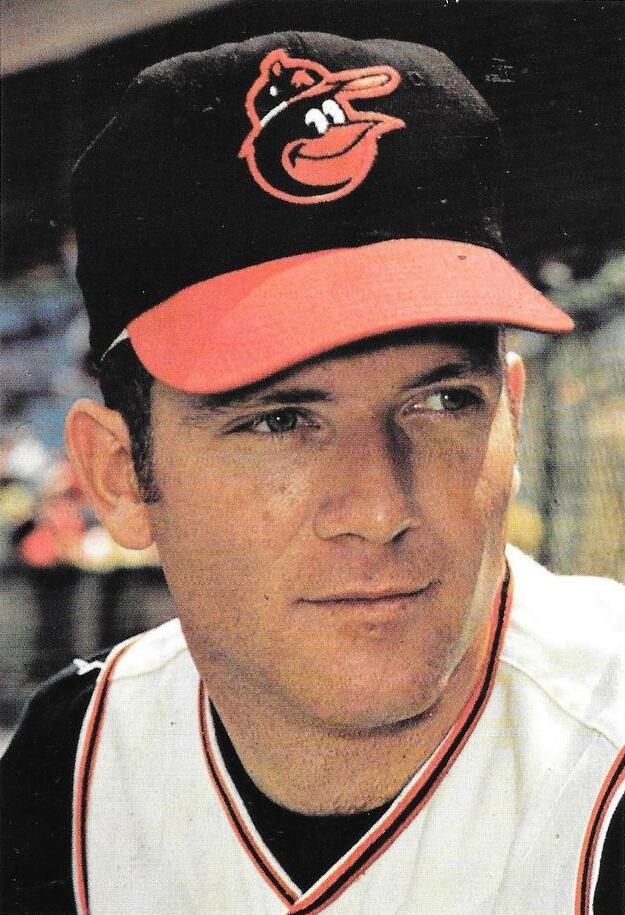
- McNally in 1971
- Pitcher
- Born: October 31, 1942; Billings, Montana, U.S.
- Died: December 1, 2002 (aged 60); Billings, Montana, U.S.
- Batted: Right Threw: Left

MLB debut
- September 26, 1962, for the Baltimore Orioles

Last MLB appearance
- June 8, 1975, for the Montreal Expos

MLB statistics
- Win–loss record: 184–119
- Earned run average: 3.24
- Strikeouts: 1,512
- Stats at Baseball Reference

Teams
- Baltimore Orioles (1962–1974); Montreal Expos (1975)

Career highlights and awards
- 3× All-Star (1969, 1970, 1972); 2× World Series champion (1966, 1970); AL wins leader (1970); Baltimore Orioles Hall of Fame

David Arthur McNally (October 31, 1942 – December 1, 2002) was an American professional baseball player. He played in Major League Baseball as a left-handed pitcher from 1962 through 1975, most notably as a member of the Baltimore Orioles dynasty that won four American League pennants and two World Series championships between 1966 and 1971. A three-time All-Star, McNally won 20 or more games for four consecutive seasons from 1968 through 1971. He was one of four 20-game winners for the 1971 Orioles (Pat Dobson, Jim Palmer, and Mike Cuellar were the other three), the last team as of 2025 to have four 20-win pitchers on the same roster.

Born in Billings, Montana, McNally was raised by his mother after his father died in the Battle of Okinawa. He was signed by the Orioles out of high school in 1960 and made his major league debut two years later, throwing a shutout in his first game in the major leagues. From 1963 through 1965, he continued to refine his pitches while securing his grip on a starting spot in the Orioles' rotation. He made two starts in the 1966 World Series, the second of which was a shutout that gave the Orioles a 4–0 victory over the Los Angeles Dodgers. McNally was bothered by a calcium deposit in his elbow in 1967; the injury limited his playing time in the second half of the season. He was named the Comeback Player of the Year in 1968 as he finished second in the American League with 22 wins.

McNally was selected to the All-Star Game for the first time in 1969, finishing the season with 20 wins. He threw 11 shutout innings to beat the Minnesota Twins in Game 2 of the first AL Championship Series, then faced the New York Mets twice in the 1969 World Series. He hit a home run against Jerry Koosman in one of the games, but the Orioles were defeated in five games. In 1970, McNally tied for the AL lead with 24 wins. He hit a grand slam in Game 3 of the 1970 World Series against the Cincinnati Reds, becoming a World Series victor for the second time as the Orioles won the World Series in five games. He missed six weeks with an injury in 1971 but still pitched enough to be one of four Orioles to win 20 games that season. McNally beat the Pittsburgh Pirates in Game 1 of the 1971 World Series, lost Game 5, and won Game 6 in relief, but the Orioles were defeated in seven games.

In 1972, McNally was named to the All-Star Game for the third time. He finished the year with his first losing record since 1964, though this was partly due to the Orioles scoring fewer runs than they had the previous year. In 1973 and 1974, he faced the Oakland Athletics in the playoffs but lost both games he pitched. Thinking he needed a change of scenery, McNally requested a trade after the 1974 season; the Orioles obliged, sending him to the Montreal Expos, with whom he played one final year before retiring halfway through 1975, citing an inability to throw the fastball. After the 1975 season, he added his name to a grievance filed against the reserve clause, which resulted in the historic Seitz decision that created free agency in baseball. McNally returned to his hometown Billings and worked as a car dealer until his death from cancer in 2002. A member of the Baltimore Orioles Hall of Fame, he is among the franchise's leaders in many statistical categories.

== Early life ==
McNally was born on October 31, 1942, in Billings, Montana. Before his third birthday, his father, James, died in the Battle of Okinawa. Betsy, his widow, worked in a welfare office to support the family; Dave was the youngest of four children. He attended Billings Central Catholic High School, but since the school did not field a baseball team, his baseball experience in his young adult years came with the Billings Royals, an American Legion team. The Royals were in the midst of winning 14 straight state championships when McNally played with them, and the team reached the Legion World Series in two of his years with them. In 1960, McNally had an 18–1 record as a pitcher. Both the Baltimore Orioles and the Los Angeles Dodgers recruited him; McNally signed with the Orioles a month before his 18th birthday, in September 1960. He later quipped that, had he known how many young pitching prospects the Orioles had, he would have signed with the Dodgers instead. Jim Russo, the scout who signed him, also signed Jim Palmer and Boog Powell for the Orioles.

== Minor league career ==
The Orioles had McNally pitch in an instructional league in fall of 1960, then assigned him to the Victoria Rosebuds of the Class AA Texas League in 1961. McNally struggled against the competition, losing three of his four starts and posting a 6.16 earned run average (ERA) before the Orioles reassigned him to the Fox Cities Foxes of the Class B Illinois-Indiana-Iowa League. At Fox Cities, McNally still had a losing record (8–10) but his ERA dropped to 4.18 in 25 games.

With the Class A Elmira Pioneers of the Eastern League in 1962, McNally was the team's best player. He tied with Wilbur Wood and Sonny Siebert for second in the league with 15 wins (behind Paul Seitz, who had 16), ranked second with 195 strikeouts (behind Bob Heffner with 234), tied John Pregenzer for eighth with 196 innings pitched, tied Bill Hands and Pregenzer for third with four shutouts (behind Steve Dalkowski with six and Richard Slomkowski with five), and had a 3.08 ERA.

== Major league career ==
=== Baltimore Orioles (1962–74) ===
==== Cementing a spot in the Major Leagues (1962–65) ====
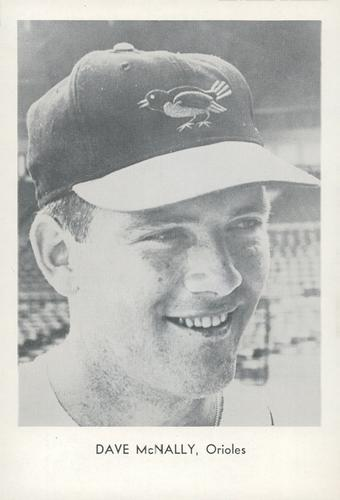
McNally in 1966.

Following his season with Elmira, McNally was a September callup by the Orioles in 1962; he got one start with the team. On September 26, he pitched the first game of a doubleheader against the Kansas City Athletics. "I was scared to death," McNally later recalled, but he threw a shutout, limiting the Athletics to two hits in nine innings.

In an interview prior to the start of the 1963 season, Baltimore manager Billy Hitchcock listed McNally among a group of prospects that could provide "whatever else is needed" for Baltimore's pitching staff. An injury to Dalkowski helped McNally make the team as a left-handed reliever. After one game out of the bullpen, he made an emergency start for an injured Chuck Estrada on April 20, limiting the Cleveland Indians to one run in a complete game, 7–1 victory. He won his first two starts, but after giving up seven runs and five runs in his next two, respectively, he was moved back to the bullpen, where he was used as a reliever through the beginning of June. Then, Estrada was placed on the disabled list on June 8 due to a bone spur and calcium deposits in his elbow. McNally replaced him in the rotation on June 12 and was used as a starter the rest of the year. He took a no decision on June 12 but held the New York Yankees to two runs (one earned) over 7 1/3 innings in a 3–2 loss. On August 22, he threw a complete game against the California Angels, striking out eight while giving up one run in a 5–1 victory. In 29 games (20 starts) his rookie year, McNally had a 7–8 record, a 4.58 ERA, 78 strikeouts, 55 walks, and 133 hits allowed in 125 2/3 innings pitched. Following the 1963 season, McNally furthered his development by pitching winter ball in Puerto Rico.

McNally was used as a starter through most of 1964. On May 12, he threw a shutout and allowed just two hits in a 5–0 victory over the Washington Senators. He also threw a shutout against Kansas City on June 2 in a 4–0 victory. Through August 15, he had a 7–10 record and a 3.89 ERA in 22 games, all but one of which were starts. Thereafter, he was mostly used out of the bullpen, starting just two more games the rest of the year. One of them, the second game of a September 7 doubleheader against Kansas City, was one of the shortest starts of his career; he faced four batters, all of whom scored in the Orioles' 6–1 defeat. In the other, on October 1, he threw a shutout against the Senators, throwing a no-hitter until Don Lock hit a double in the seventh inning. In 30 games (23 starts), he had a 9–11 record, a 3.67 ERA, 88 strikeouts, 51 walks, and 157 hits allowed in 159 1/3 innings. His three shutouts tied with five other pitchers for ninth in the American League (AL).

During 1965 spring training, the Orioles figured out that McNally's body language was giving away to the hitters which pitch he was going to throw. He worked on the problem and had it corrected before the season started. Though he made a few relief appearances throughout the year, he was mainly used as the team's fifth starter. Through the end of May, he had a 4.19 ERA, but he pitched better in the succeeding months. He quit smoking midseason and gained about twenty pounds, which he credited to his improvement, though after the season he would resume smoking again. In the second game of a doubleheader on August 4, he threw a shutout as the Orioles defeated the Angels 8–0. For the second year in a row, he threw a shutout on October 1, limiting Cleveland to two hits in a 2–0 victory in the first game of a doubleheader. McNally topped the 10-win mark for the first time in his career, finishing the season with an 11–6 record. In 35 games (29 starts), he had a 2.85 ERA, 116 strikeouts, 73 walks, and 163 hits allowed in 198 2/3 innings.

==== World Series victor, struggles, comeback (1966–68) ====
McNally held the Yankees to two runs over 7 1/3 innings on April 16, 1966, in a 7–2 victory over the Yankees. On July 21, he was one out away from a complete game against the Detroit Tigers, but with the Orioles leading 6–2, Davey Johnson made an error, allowing a third run to score. When Don Wert followed with a run-scoring double, manager Hank Bauer replaced McNally with Eddie Fisher. McNally was credited with allowing four runs (two earned), but he still got the win as the Orioles held on and won 6–4. McNally had a 10–3 record through the end of July, but had an equal number of wins and losses (three) in the final two months of the season. One of those three wins was a shutout of the Senators on August 6, in a 4–0 victory. Mark Armour of the Society for American Baseball Research called him "the team's most consistent starter" for 1966. In 34 games (33 starts), he had a 13–6 record, a 3.17 ERA, 158 strikeouts, 64 walks, and 212 hits allowed in 213 innings. As a hitter, he kept his average close to .250 by midseason (uncharacteristically high for a pitcher) and finished the year hitting .195. When asked about his hitting midseason, he said, "I don't have to explain my hitting. I mean, did Ted Williams have to explain?"

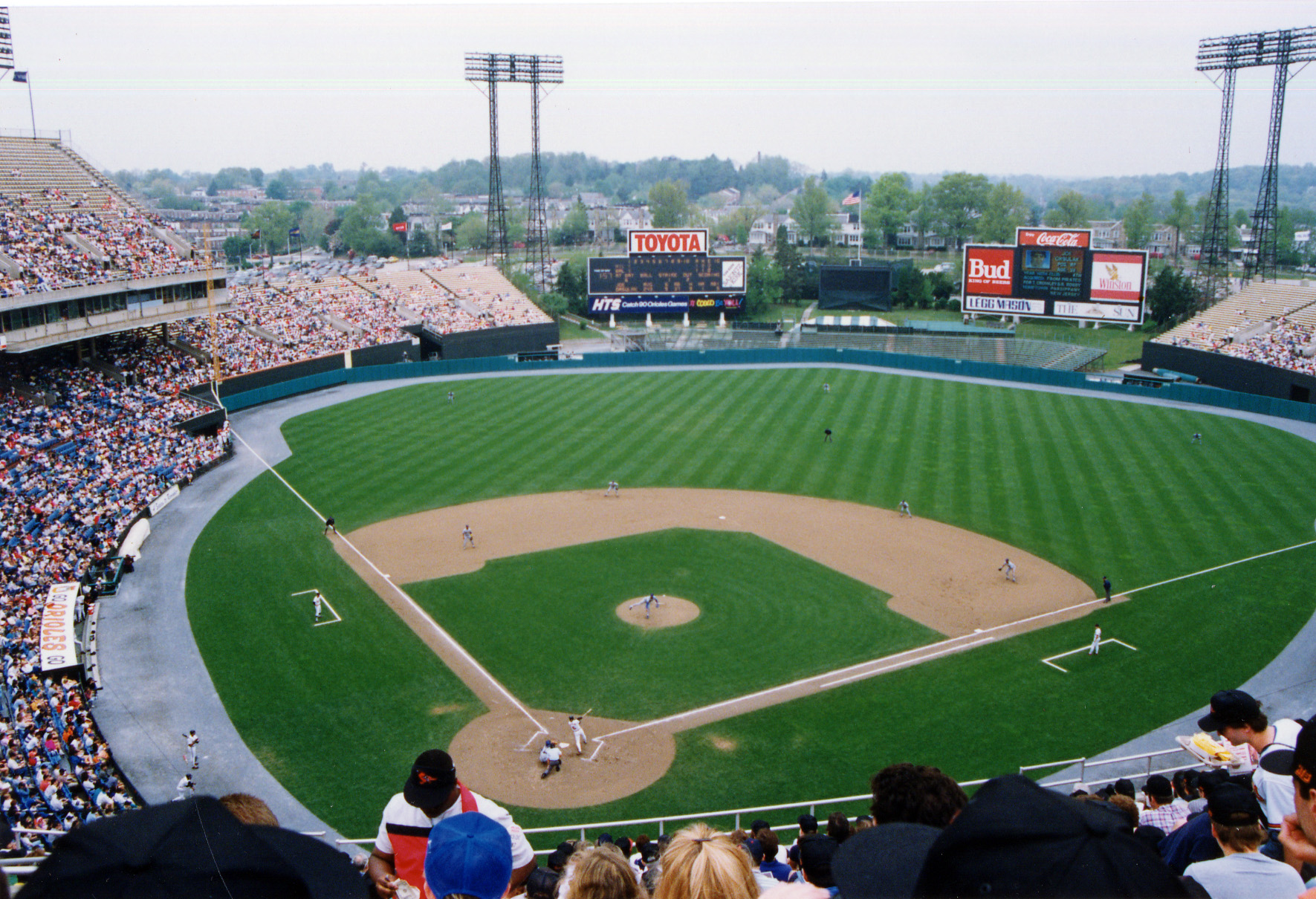
Memorial Stadium was McNally's home ballpark during his time with the Orioles.

The Orioles won the AL pennant in 1966, earning them a meeting with the defending-champion Los Angeles Dodgers in the 1966 World Series. In the fourth game, McNally and Don Drysdale matched four-hitters; one of Baltimore's hits was Frank Robinson's fourth-inning home run for a 1–0 Oriole victory. "I had a lot of things going for me that day," McNally later said. "The movement on my fastball was sufficient, and I had a pretty good curveball and changeup." His shutout capped a World Series in which Baltimore pitchers set a Fall Classic record by pitching 33 1/3 consecutive shutout innings, beginning with Moe Drabowsky's 6 2/3 scoreless innings in relief of McNally (Drabowsky entered the game in the third inning and issued a bases-loaded walk that scored Lou Johnson—the Dodgers' second and last run of this Series) in Game One, followed by shutouts from Jim Palmer and Wally Bunker. The trio of McNally, Bunker, and Palmer had pitched one shutout total during the regular season—that by McNally on August 6 against the Senators. It was the Orioles' first ever World Series championship, and a picture of third baseman Brooks Robinson leaping into the air as he ran to the pitcher's mound to congratulate McNally after the game remains one of the most iconic Oriole photos.

In 1967, McNally was the Opening Day starter for Baltimore. He was throwing a shutout against the Angels in the first game of a doubleheader on April 16, 1967, but he allowed two runs in the eighth inning. In the ninth, with the Orioles up 4–2, McNally retired the first two Angel hitters he faced but surrendered the lead when he gave up back-to-back home runs to José Cardenal and Don Mincher. He was removed from the game, and the Orioles lost 5–4 in 10 innings. After losing just six games in 1965 and 1966, McNally had five losses through June 18 of 1967, with a 5.71 ERA to go along with them. In June, doctors discovered a calcium deposit in his left elbow. They treated the injury through draining fluid and injecting cortisone. Following his first cortisone shot, McNally limited the Chicago White Sox to one run and five hits on July 6 in a complete-game, 5–1 victory. One week later, in the second game of a doubleheader against the Boston Red Sox, he threw a shutout as the Orioles won 10–0. However, the injury restricted him to four games after July 21. In 24 games (22 starts), he had a 7–7 record, a 4.54 ERA, 70 strikeouts, 39 walks, and 134 hits allowed in 119 innings.

McNally's first 1968 start did not come until the season's fifth game, but he held the Oakland Athletics to one run in a complete game, 4–1 victory on April 17. Despite a 2.23 ERA, he had an 8–8 record through his first two starts of July when Earl Weaver became the manager of the Orioles; starting Weaver's first game on July 11, he threw a two-hit shutout against the Senators, taking only two hours and 12 minutes to do so. That shutout was the first of 12 straight wins for McNally. He held Detroit to one run over 6 1/3 innings on July 20 and hit his first major league home run against Denny McLain (who would win 31 games that year) in the Orioles' 5–3 victory. In the last game of the streak, on September 28, he became a 20-game winner for the first time as the Orioles defeated the White Sox 4–2; McNally pitched the whole game, and the two runs he allowed were unearned. McNally finished the season among the AL leaders with 22 wins (second to McLain's 31), a 1.95 ERA (third behind Luis Tiant's 1.60 and Sam McDowell's 1.81), 202 strikeouts (fifth), five shutouts (tied with George Brunet for seventh), and 273 innings pitched (fourth). He broke Barney Pelty's franchise season record of walks plus hits per innings pitched that had been set in 1906, establishing the new franchise record of 0.852 and leading the AL. At the plate, McNally hit three home runs during the 1968 season; he would hit at least one each of the following seasons until the AL adopted the designated hitter rule in 1973. For his successful return from injury, McNally won the Major League Baseball Comeback Player of the Year Award. He finished fifth in AL Most Valuable Player (MVP) voting and was named Baltimore's MVP.

==== In the World Series every year (1969–71) ====
After winning the last two decisions of the 1968 season, McNally opened 1969 with a 15–0 record; his first loss of the season came when he allowed a grand slam to Rich Reese in a loss to the Minnesota Twins on August 3, and he ended the regular season with a 20–7 record. His 17 straight wins were an AL record at the time, and his 15 consecutive wins to open the season tied an AL record. He threw a four-hit shutout in a 9–0 victory over the Senators on April 12. On May 5, he had a no-hitter going until one out in the ninth inning, when Cesar Tovar singled; McNally got Rod Carew to hit into a double play to preserve the shutout. He threw back-to-back shutouts against the White Sox on June 15 and the Senators on June 19. He was named to the All-Star Game for the first time in his career. Though his record was only 5–7 in the season's final two months, he returned to the playoffs as the Orioles won the AL East. McNally's 20 wins tied Mel Stottlemyre and Dave Boswell for third in the league behind McLain's 24 and teammate Mike Cuellar's 23, his four shutouts tied with five other pitchers for fourth in the league, his 166 strikeouts ranked ninth, and he was second to McLain with 40 starts. He finished 13th in AL MVP voting and ranked fourth in AL Cy Young Award voting.

In the postseason, the Orioles faced the Twins in the newly created best-of-five AL Championship Series, the winner of which would play in the World Series. McNally threw nine shutout innings in Game 2, limiting the Twins to three hits, but the Orioles were unable to score, and the game continued. Still on the mound, McNally threw a hitless 10th inning. With two outs in the top of the eleventh, he walked Harmon Killebrew and Tony Oliva to put a runner in scoring position before getting Bob Allison to line out to Don Buford in left field. Curt Motton finally drove in a run in the bottom of the inning, and the Orioles prevailed 1–0. McNally's shutout is the longest by a pitcher in the postseason, and Will Leitch of MLB.com called the game the Orioles' most exciting playoff victory in 2018. The Orioles faced the New York Mets in the 1969 World Series. In Game 2, the Orioles and Mets were tied at one in the ninth when McNally, with two outs, gave up three singles in a row to give the Mets a 2–1 lead. The two runs were all he allowed in the ballgame, but the Mets prevailed 2–1. He hit a two-run home run against Jerry Koosman in Game 5 and left the game after seven innings with the score tied at three. However, the Orioles lost the game 5–3, and the Mets won the World Series in five games.

McNally hit a home run against Tom Murphy on June 9, 1970, and held the Angels to three runs over seven innings, but the bullpen gave up some additional runs as the Orioles lost 7–5. On June 21, McNally pitched into the ninth inning before being replaced by Pete Richert, limited Washington to two runs, and won his 100th career game as the Orioles defeated the Senators 4–2. He made the All-Star team for the second year in a row, picked by Weaver, who was managing the team. McNally had a 12–7 record and a 4.38 ERA on July 18, but he posted a 1.96 ERA for the remainder of the season and went 12–2, with the Orioles winning 14 of the 17 games he appeared in thereafter. From July 26 through August 29, he won nine consecutive games. On August 21, 1970, McNally threw a shutout in a 5–0 victory over the Angels. Four days later, he allowed 10 hits in a complete game against the Athletics, but only one run, and he picked up his 20th win of the season as Baltimore defeated Oakland by a score of 5–1. On August 29, he gave up only one run in a complete game, 6–1 victory over the Milwaukee Brewers; the run was unearned. During the 1970 season, the Orioles never lost more than two straight games in which Palmer, Cuellar, and McNally started. The two times they lost two games in a row, it was McNally who ended the streak. McNally's 24 wins at the end of the year tied with teammate Cuellar and Jim Perry for the AL lead. McNally ranked seventh with 185 strikeouts, tied with four others for the lead with 40 starts, and ranked fourth with 296 innings pitched. After the season, he finished second to Jim Perry in AL Cy Young Award voting and ranked 16th in AL MVP voting.

For the second year in a row in 1970, the Orioles faced the Twins in the ALCS. Starting Game 2 for the Orioles, McNally held the Twins hitless for the first three innings as the Orioles scored three runs. In the fourth inning, McNally made the score 4–0 with an RBI single against Tom Hall. After walking Leo Cárdenas to lead off the bottom of the inning, he allowed back-to-back home runs to Killebrew and Oliva to make it 4–3. McNally never let the Twins score again, and the Orioles cruised to an 11–3 victory before ultimately sweeping the ALCS. This year in the World Series, the Orioles faced the Cincinnati Reds. Starting Game 3 of the series, McNally gave up a run in the second inning but held the Reds to just that through the first six innings of the game; meanwhile, Baltimore gave him for runs of support. After Tony Cloninger of the Reds walked Paul Blair with one out in the sixth, Cloninger was replaced with Wayne Granger, who allowed a double to Brooks Robinson and intentionally walked Davey Johnson before striking out Andy Etchebarren, bringing McNally to the plate with the bases loaded and two outs. McNally helped his own cause, depositing a pitch from Granger in the left field seats and becoming the only pitcher in major league history to hit a grand slam in a World Series. He went on to allow two more runs, but the Orioles led by more than enough in their 9–3 victory. After losing Game 4, the Orioles defeated the Reds in Game 5, making McNally a World Series champion for the second time in his career. The bat McNally hit the grand slam with (lent to him by Motton) is at the Baseball Hall of Fame in Cooperstown.

Entering the 1971 season, the Orioles raised McNally's salary to $85,000. He held the Senators to two runs on Opening Day (April 7) in a complete-game, 3–2 victory. On April 23, he and Clyde Wright of the California Angels held each other's teams to two runs until the ninth, when the Orioles scored six times to give McNally an 8–2 victory. On September 7, he limited Cleveland to one run over nine innings and hit a two-run home run against McDowell in a 3–1 victory. A sore arm kept McNally from pitching for six weeks in July and August, but he was still the first Oriole to win 20 games when he threw a shutout against the Yankees on September 21. McNally was one of four 20-game winners for the 1971 Orioles (Pat Dobson, Palmer, and Mike Cuellar were the other three). They were the first quartet of pitchers to each win 20 games for the same team since four members of the 1920 Chicago White Sox each won 20. McNally led the Orioles with 21 wins, tying with Catfish Hunter for fourth in the AL; his 2.89 ERA ranked seventh; and he led the AL with a .808 winning percentage. In 30 starts, his record was 21–5, and he struck out 91 batters in 224 1/3 innings. He finished 4th in AL Cy Young Award voting and 11th in AL MVP balloting. His streak of four 20-win seasons in a row was the first in the AL since Red Ruffing did so from 1936 through 1939.

The Orioles won the AL East for the third straight year in 1971 and faced the Oakland Athletics in the ALCS. Used as the Game 1 starter, McNally gave up three runs over seven innings, saying after the game he did not have his best stuff. However, Baltimore scored four runs in the seventh inning to rally from a 3–1 deficit, giving McNally the win in a 5–3 victory. After sweeping Oakland, the Orioles faced the Pittsburgh Pirates in the 1971 World Series. McNally again started Game 1, prompting Pirates' manager Danny Murtaugh to bench Richie Hebner and Al Oliver (left-handed batters) in favor of Jose Pagan and Gene Clines (less productive right-handed batters). In the second inning, errors by Mark Belanger and Elrod Hendricks led to three unearned runs scoring for Pittsburgh. However, McNally would not allow any other runs, limiting Pittsburgh to three hits and retiring 19 straight hitters at one point in a complete game, 5–3 victory for Baltimore. He was less effective in Game 5, allowing four runs (three earned) in four innings as the Orioles lost 4–0. In Game 6, with the score tied 2–2 and two outs in the 10th inning, he entered the game, walked Willie Stargell to load the bases, then retired Oliver on a fly ball to keep the game tied. Brooks Robinson hit a sacrifice fly in the bottom of the inning; McNally earned the win as the Orioles prevailed 3–2. He was brought in to face Stargell with two runners on base in Game 7, but McNally got Stargell to ground out to end the inning; however, the Orioles lost that game 2–1, as the Pirates won the series in seven games.

==== Salary increase, fewer runs (1972–74) ====
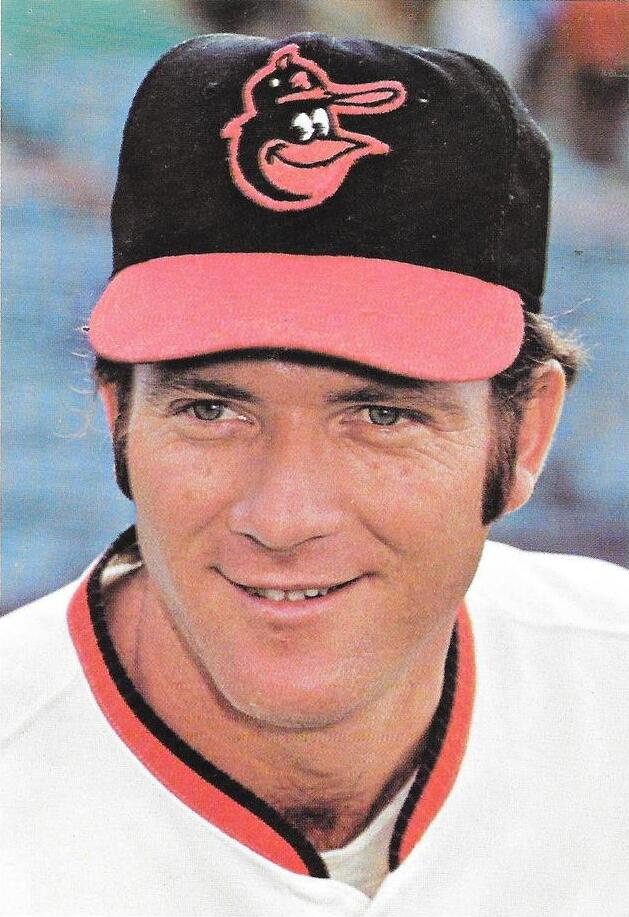
McNally in 1973.

In 1972, the Orioles raised McNally's salary once again, this time to $105,000. In the Orioles' second game of the year on April 17, he threw a shutout in a 4–0 victory over the Yankees. In fact, four of his first five starts were shutouts. The Orioles only scored one run for him on July 5, but that was enough for a win as McNally shut out the White Sox. McNally was selected to his third All-Star team in 1972, though he lost the game for the AL in the 10th inning when Joe Morgan drove in a run with a single. Through July 22, McNally had a 10–7 record, but he would win only three of his remaining 13 decisions. This was due in part to struggles by the Oriole offense. McNally's 2.95 ERA was lower than it had been in 1971, but the Orioles only scored 3.3 runs per game after scoring 4.7 the year before. Consequently, McNally finished with a losing record (13–17) for the first time since 1964, and his 17 losses tied with four other pitchers for third in the AL (behind Stottlemyre's and teammate Dobson's 18). He did manage to tie Tiant and Roger Nelson for fourth in the AL with six shutouts.

McNally started the 1973 season with a shutout of the Brewers on April 6. Six days later, he pitched shutout ball for 9 2/3 innings, limiting Detroit to three hits in the Orioles' 1–0 win in 10 innings. On May 10, he threw 10 innings against Oakland, but Joe Rudi's RBI double in the 10th provided the winning margin in Oakland's 4–3 victory. He gave up 10 hits to the Yankees on June 27 but no runs in the Orioles' 4–0 victory. On September 1, he shut out the Yankees again as the Orioles prevailed 1–0. McNally's record was 9–12 after his start on August 3. He brought it to 17–16, moving his winning percentage over .500 with a victory over the Brewers on September 23, but he lost his last game of the year six days later to finish the season at 17–17. In 38 starts, he had a 3.21 ERA, 87 strikeouts, 81 walks, and 247 hits allowed in 266 innings. His 17 losses tied with Bert Blyleven and Rudy May for fifth in the AL, but his 3.21 ERA ranked ninth in the league.

The Orioles won the AL East again in 1973 and faced Oakland in the ALCS. McNally started Game 2, allowing four home runs and five runs total in 7 2/3 innings as the Orioles lost 6–3. It was his only appearance of the series, which Oakland won in five games.

On June 15, 1974, McNally pitched 11 innings, holding the White Sox to three runs and getting the win when Boog Powell hit a game-winning home run in the bottom of the 11th. Exactly two weeks later, he held the Yankees to two hits in a shutout as the Orioles won 2–0. Baltimore faced the Red Sox for a doubleheader on July 3. Starting the first game, McNally was called for two balks in the first inning. He and Weaver spent 10 minutes arguing the calls, and McNally was ejected from the game. The Orioles won the game 9–2, and in the ninth inning of Game 2, McNally came in and recorded the save in the Orioles' 6–4 win. His record was 8–8 on July 28, but McNally won eight of his last 10 decisions to up it to 16–10 by season's end. He held the Kansas City Royals scoreless on August 18, enabling the Orioles to win 1–0. On September 24, McNally gave up Al Kaline's 3,000th career hit in Baltimore; he got a no-decision in the game, but the Orioles won 5–4. In 39 games (37 starts) with the Orioles in 1974, McNally had a 16–10 record, 111 strikeouts, 81 walks, and 260 hits allowed in 259 innings. He had four shutouts, tying with five other pitchers for sixth in the league. His 3.58 ERA was 0.04 under the league average, but it was his highest since his injury-riddled 1967 season. Following the season, he requested a trade, thinking he might be helped by going to a new team.

=== Montreal Expos (1975) ===
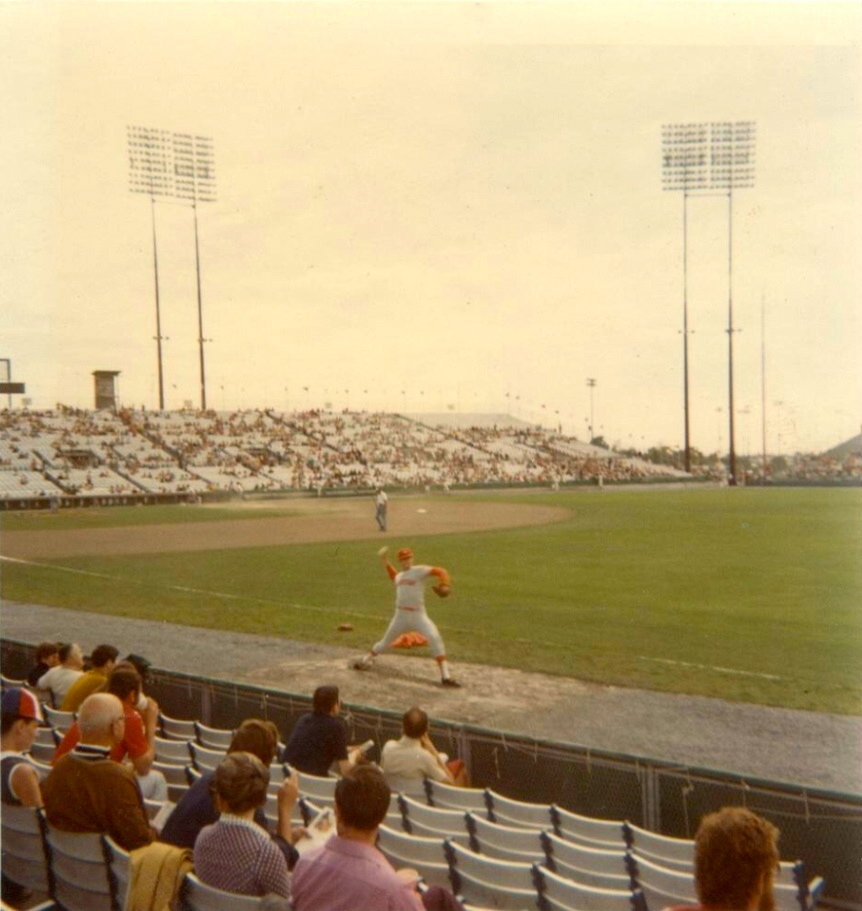
The Expos played home games at Jarry Park Stadium in 1975.

McNally's 13-year tenure with the Orioles ended when he was traded along with Rich Coggins and minor-league right-handed pitcher Bill Kirkpatrick to the Expos for Ken Singleton and Mike Torrez at the Winter Meetings on December 4, 1974. Along with Woodie Fryman from the Detroit Tigers, he was one of two left-handed pitchers acquired that day by the Expos which was devoid of southpaws for all but three weeks of the 1974 campaign.

He was the Opening Day starter for the Expos in 1975, limiting the St. Louis Cardinals to four runs (two earned) over seven innings in an 8–4 victory on April 7. He posted a 3.19 ERA in his first four starts, winning three of them. He limited the Pirates to three runs while pitching into the ninth inning on April 22, earning his third win of the year. Thereafter, he lost six straight decisions in his last eight games, posting a 6.60 ERA. In the first game of a doubleheader on June 8 against the San Diego Padres, he gave up five runs (four earned) over six innings in what would be his last major league appearance. The next day, he retired. "I'm not throwing the [fastball]. I have no oomph on it, and there's no ray of hope that it'll get better. There's no chance I can do a decent job, and I'm not paid to do that." In 12 starts with the Expos, he had a 3–6 record, a 5.24 ERA, 36 strikeouts, 36 walks, and 88 hits allowed in 77 1/3 innings. Expos sportscaster Jacques Doucet called the trade for McNally the Expos' most "lopsided," noting that Kirkpatrick never reached the major leagues and Coggins appeared in only 13 games for the ballclub.

== 1975 free agent labor grievance ==
McNally is known for his role in the historic 1975 Seitz decision which led to the downfall of Major League Baseball's (MLB) reserve clause, ushering in the current era of free agency. McNally and Andy Messersmith were the only two players in 1975 playing on the one-year reserve clause in effect at the time. Neither had signed a contract, but both were held with their teams under the rule. The two challenged the rule and won free agency.

McNally retired in June 1975, and he had no intention of actually claiming free agency. According to John Helyar's book The Lords of the Realm, players' union executive director Marvin Miller asked McNally to add his name to the grievance filed in opposition to the reserve clause, and he agreed. Miller thought of McNally, Helyar wrote, as "insurance" in the event that Messersmith decided to sign a new contract. The MLB wanted McNally's name off the grievance, so the Expos offered him a $25,000 ($149,583 today) signing bonus and a $125,000 ($747,913 today) contract if he made the team. McNally declined. The MLB hoped that Messersmith would also sign a contract, eliminating the challenge.

Miller corroborated Helyar's account in his 1991 memoir, A Whole Different Ballgame. Miller explained that while Messersmith was the primary test case, as he was still in the prime of his career in 1975, he wanted McNally to add his name to the grievance because he was under the assumption that Dodgers owner Walter O'Malley would end up signing Messersmith to a contract before the grievance could be decided under binding arbitration. McNally, who had been a Major League Baseball Players Association (MLBPA) player rep during his time with the Orioles, was working as a Ford dealer in Billings, when Miller contacted him about joining the Messersmith grievance. McNally agreed, which meant that even if the Dodgers signed Messersmith to a contract, the grievance would go forward. As Miller wrote ironically, "McNally had been a starter for fourteen years, but the last act of his career was to serve in arbitration as a reliever."

== Career statistics ==
W	L	PCT	ERA	G	GS	CG	SHO	BF	IP	H	R	ER	HR	K	BB	BB/9	WP	HBP	Fld%	AVG	SH
184	119	.607	3.24	424	396	120	33	11229	2730	2488	1070	982	230	1512	826	2.7	59	72	.961	.133	58

== Pitching style ==
McNally threw the three basic pitches: a fastball, a curveball, and a slider. He was very good at controlling the fastball. Palmer praised his other two pitches, calling them "a great curve and a killer of a slider." The slider did not come along until later; McNally had used it in the minor leagues but relied on his two other pitches until after his injury-plagued 1967 campaign. He tried throwing it in a bullpen session in 1968, impressed catcher Etchebarren with it, and added it to his repertoire for the rest of his career. Weaver said it was his ability to mix his pitches that made him successful: "[McNally] did it with cunning and intelligence. He loved to set you up with a change, fool you with that tremendous curve and then throw that fastball by you." Pitching coach Bamberger concurred: "There are pitchers who are faster and maybe have better curveballs, but the difference is McNally knows exactly how to use what he has." Powell remembered how little time McNally took between pitches during a game: "It was 'Let's go boys; let's get it over with and get out of here; we've got better things to do.' He didn't have overpowering anything, but he was a magician with the stuff he had." Ken McMullen, a hitter for the Angels who faced McNally, called his curveball "great" and said he could throw it "anytime" during an at bat. Washington star Frank Howard was one of the hitters who gave McNally the most trouble throughout his career. He and Willie Horton were the only hitters with more than six home runs against McNally in their careers; Howard hit 13 and batted .336 against him. However, McNally enjoyed a great deal of success against Howard's Senators, whom he defeated 13 times in a row before they moved to Texas after the 1971 season.

== Personal life ==
Jean Hoffer, McNally's high school sweetheart, married him in 1961. The couple had two sons (Jeff and Mike) and three daughters (Pam, Susan, and Anne). They purchased a home in Lutherville, Maryland in 1966. Jerry Hoffberger, who owned the Orioles, employed McNally at his brewery during offseasons. In his last active season with the Expos and shortly after he retired, McNally kept his family in Lutherville so his children could finish the school year. Just before the family moved, in late June 1975, McNally checked in to Sinai Hospital in Baltimore with a case of chronic hiccups that had irritated him for nine days. After three more days, they went away.

After retiring from baseball, McNally moved back to Billings, where he joined his brother, Jim, in the automotive industry. Dave had purchased a car dealership in 1973 which Jim was running. Upon his return to Billings, Dave purchased a second dealership which he ran, later opening a third dealership as well. "I follow baseball casually, but I follow the automobile business more carefully," he told writer Maury Allen. Golf was a hobby of his; he had a handicap of eight in the sport. His son Jeff was drafted by the Brewers out of high school in 1980, but he never played professionally, opting instead to earn a degree at Stanford University. Diagnosed with lung and prostate cancer in 1997, McNally lived for another five years until his death in 2002.

== Legacy ==
McNally, along with Palmer and Cuellar, gave the Orioles one of the best starting rotations in history during the 1960s and early 1970s. "Dave was an unbelievable competitor," Weaver said of him, also praising McNally's personality in general. "He was 100 percent gentleman. He was the kind of guy you wanted your son to be." In fact, McNally and his wife, Jean, served as the godparents for Palmer's youngest daughter.

His 13 seasons with the Orioles left McNally's name among the team leaders in many statistics. His 181 wins were the team record when he departed in 1974 and are still second in franchise history to Palmer's 268. His 33 shutouts rank second to Palmer's 53, and his 2652 2/3 innings pitched rank second to Palmer's 3948. In strikeouts, he ranks third with 1476, behind Palmer's 2212 and Mike Mussina's 1535. He is fourth in games pitched with 412 and second to Palmer in games started, with 384. He is among the Orioles' single-season records in many other categories, as well. His 24 wins in 1970 are tied for third, and his 22 wins in 1968 are tied for ninth. His 202 strikeouts in 1968 are the seventh-most in a season by an Oriole. The six shutouts he had in 1972 are tied for the fourth-most in a season by an Oriole, and his 1.95 ERA in 1968 is the ninth-lowest in a season in franchise history (tied with Bob Reynolds's 1.95 mark in 1973). Excluding players who were with the organization before 1954 (when the Orioles were still the St. Louis Browns), Stu Miller (1.89 ERA in 1965) is the only Oriole to have a lower ERA than McNally and Reynolds in a season.

In 1978, McNally was inducted into the Baltimore Orioles Hall of Fame. Sports Illustrated named him Montana's Athlete of the Century in 1999, and he was named to the Orioles' All-Century team that same year. In a 2004 Sports Illustrated poll asking Montanans to name the "greatest athlete who ever lived in or played for a team in your state," McNally finished third with 9% of the vote, behind Dave Dickenson (19%) and Jan Stenerud (18%).
