= Mike Cuellar =

Cuban baseball player (1937–2010)

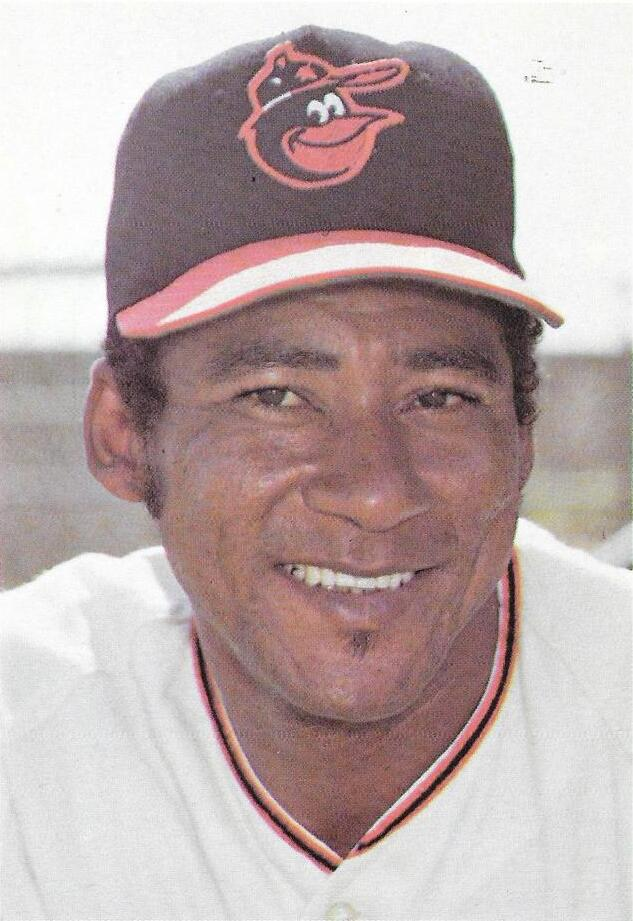
- Cuellar in 1972
- Pitcher
- Born: May 8, 1937; Santa Clara, Cuba
- Died: April 2, 2010 (aged 72); Orlando, Florida, U.S.
- Batted: Left Threw: Left

MLB debut
- April 18, 1959, for the Cincinnati Reds

Last MLB appearance
- May 3, 1977, for the California Angels

MLB statistics
- Win–loss record: 185–130
- Earned run average: 3.14
- Strikeouts: 1,632
- Stats at Baseball Reference

Teams
- Cincinnati Reds (1959); St. Louis Cardinals (1964); Houston Astros (1965–1968); Baltimore Orioles (1969–1976); California Angels (1977)

Career highlights and awards
- 4× All-Star (1967, 1970, 1971, 1974); 2× World Series champion (1964, 1970); AL Cy Young Award (1969); MLB wins leader (1970); Baltimore Orioles Hall of Fame

Miguel Ángel Cuellar Santana (KWAY-ar; May 8, 1937 – April 2, 2010) was a Cuban professional baseball player. He played for 15 seasons in Major League Baseball as a left-handed pitcher in 1959 and from 1964 through 1977, most prominently as a member of the Baltimore Orioles who won the American League (AL) pennant in each of Cuellar's first three seasons with the team. During that time, Cuellar and the Orioles won the 1970 World Series. Cuellar also played for the Cincinnati Reds, St. Louis Cardinals, Houston Astros and California Angels.

Cuellar and Denny McLain each won the AL Cy Young Award in 1969, due to a tie in the voting. For the Orioles, Cuellar won 20-or-more games in a season four times from 1969 through 1974. Along with Jim Palmer, Dave McNally, and Pat Dobson, he was one of four Oriole starters to win at least 20 games in 1971. Cuellar, nicknamed "Crazy Horse" because of his superstitious nature, ranks among Baltimore's top five career leaders in wins (143), strikeouts (1,011), shutouts (30) and innings pitched (2,028). In 1982, Cuellar was inducted into the Baltimore Orioles Hall of Fame.

== Life and career ==
=== Early life and first stints in the majors ===
Miguel Angel Cuellar Santana was born in Santa Clara, Cuba, on May 8, 1937. One of four brothers, Cuellar's family made their living working in Cuban sugar mills. Not interested in pursuing that as a career, Cuellar joined the Cuban Army, which allowed him to play baseball on weekends. He threw a no-hitter for an army team in 1955, drawing attention from scouts. Following his army service, he pitched for Cinco Estrellas in the Nicaraguan league in 1956, then joined Almendares of the Cuban Winter League over the offseason.

In the 1950s, the Cincinnati Reds executed a working agreement with the Havana Sugar Kings of the Triple-A International League (IL), helping them acquire many Cuban players, including Cuellar. Cuellar struck out seven Montreal Royals in just over two innings of work in his first game with Havana in 1957. Used as a starting pitcher and as a relief pitcher (44 games, 16 starts), he posted an 8–7 record and led the IL in earned run average (ERA) with a 2.44 mark. The next season, he had a 2.77 ERA and a 13–12 record, pitching 220 innings.

Entering the 1959 season, Cuellar was featured on a baseball card in a Topps set for the very first time, though the company misspelled his name as "Cueller." Part of Cincinnati's roster to begin the season, Cuellar made his major league debut with Cincinnati against the Philadelphia Phillies at Crosley Field on April 18, 1959. He entered the contest in relief of Don Newcombe in the second inning with the Reds losing 4–2. In his two innings of work, Cuellar surrendered a grand slam to Gene Freese in the third and a two-run double to Al Schroll in the fourth. The Reds went on to lose 14–9. His only other appearance with the Reds came three days later against the Milwaukee Braves. Again he pitched two innings in relief, giving up two runs as the Reds lost 7–4. After that, he was returned to Havana; it would be several years before he pitched in the major leagues again.

For the rest of 1959, Cuellar had a 10–11 record and 111 strikeouts. Though his 11 losses were tied with four others for eighth in the league, he ranked eighth with a 2.80 ERA and fifth with 220 innings pitched. Havana won the IL championship and defeated the Minneapolis Millers in the Junior World Series.

The Sugar Kings moved to Jersey City, New Jersey, in the middle of the 1960 season in response to Fidel Castro's nationalization of American businesses in Cuba. In 33 games (21 starts) for the franchise, Cuellar had a 6–9 record, a 3.53 ERA, and 74 strikeouts in 148 innings pitched. He split the 1961 season between three Triple-A teams: Jersey City of the IL and the Indianapolis Indians of the American Association (both Reds affiliates) and the Syracuse Chiefs of the IL (an affiliate of the Minnesota Twins). Exact statistics for this year are unknown.

Cuellar spent the 1962 season with the Sultanes de Monterrey of the Triple-A Mexican League, appearing in 37 games. He split the 1963 minor league season between affiliates of the Detroit Tigers and Cleveland Indians. For the Knoxville Smokies (Detroit) of the Double-A South Atlantic League, he had a 1–1 record, a 2.54 ERA, and 39 strikeouts. With the IL's Jacksonville Suns (Cleveland), he had a 6–7 record, a 3.79 ERA, and 85 strikeouts in 24 games (16 starts).

After being stuck in the minors for five years, Cuellar experienced improvement in 1964. During the offseason, while he had been playing winter ball, teammate Ruben Gomez had suggested he start throwing a screwball. Signed by the St. Louis Cardinals in 1964, Cuellar used the pitch about 30 percent of the time while pitching for Jacksonville, now an affiliate of the Cardinals. He made 10 starts for Jacksonville, posting a 1.78 ERA while winning six of seven decisions. Seeing his success, the Cardinals decided to promote him in mid-June.

Cuellar was used primarily as a relief pitcher for the rest of the year, though he also made seven starts. One of these came in the second game of a doubleheader against the Pittsburgh Pirates; Cuellar allowed five runs in 7 1/3 innings but earned the win (his first) in a 12–5 Cardinal victory. Cuellar also beat the Pirates on August 26, this time allowing just two runs in a complete game, 4–2 victory. Freese, who had hit a grand slam off of Cuellar five years earlier, made the last out. The hitter said that "he's a lot faster and has come with quite a scroogie". In 32 games (seven starts), Cuellar had a 5–5 record, a 4.50 ERA, 56 strikeouts, 33 walks, and 80 hits allowed in 72 innings pitched. The Cardinals made a late-season surge as the Phillies collapsed in September. This took the Cardinals and Cuellar to the 1964 World Series. Though Cuellar did not pitch in any of the games, he became a World Series champion for the first time as the Cardinals defeated the New York Yankees in seven games.

In 1965, Cuellar failed to make the Cardinals roster and was assigned to Jacksonville to begin the year. With the Suns, he posted a 2.51 ERA and a 9–1 record. At the June 15 trade deadline, Cuellar and Ron Taylor were traded to the Houston Astros for Hal Woodeshick and Chuck Taylor.

=== Houston Astros (1965–68) ===
Cuellar spent the rest of 1965 in the major leagues with the Astros, mainly as a relief pitcher, though he also made four starts. He posted a 5.81 ERA in his first 15 games, then posted an 0.72 ERA in his last 10. Twice in September, he had relief outings in which he pitched more than five scoreless innings. His record for the season was 1–4, and he struck out 46 batters in 56 innings, posting a 3.54 ERA.

After beginning the 1966 season as a relief pitcher, Cuellar was added to the starting rotation on April 25. Facing the Reds, Cuellar held his old team to five hits and one unearned run in a 2–1 victory. After Cuellar posted a 1.29 ERA in his first four starts, manager Grady Hatton said: "I've created a monster". Hatton explained: "For a while, all Cuellar wanted to do was throw screwballs. But this year, he's mixing 'em up with fast balls and curves, and making the batters hit the ball. He's got good control and a good fast ball, and he's finally making use of them." Cuellar had learned the curveball from Astro pitching coach Gordon Jones, and he was also throwing his screwball on 50-60 percent of his pitches. He strained a muscle in his side and had to leave a game on May 21 but was back to action by June 2. Cuellar ultimately won his first six decisions, the last a 3–2 complete game over the Cardinals at the Astrodome on June 25, in which he recorded a career-high 15 strikeouts. He suffered two close losses during the campaign. On August 12, he held the San Francisco Giants to four hits and one run in eight innings, but Gaylord Perry of the Giants threw a 92-pitch shutout. On September 10, he and Don Drysdale of the Dodgers held each other's teams scoreless through nine innings; Cuellar took the loss when he gave up a run in the 10th. Cuellar threw his first major league shutout on August 29, defeating the Pirates by a score of 2–0. In Cuellar's final start of the campaign, a 4–3 road win over Cincinnati in the second match of a September 28 twi-night doubleheader, he hit his first major-league home run, off Sammy Ellis, to lead off the top of the fifth. Cuellar finished with a 12–10 record, 175 strikeouts, and a 2.22 ERA, (second in the National League (NL) to Sandy Koufax' 1.73).

Following a loss on May 17, 1967, Cuellar won six straight games, posting a 1.18 ERA over the span. The first of these was a 2–0 shutout of the Giants on May 21. He made the first of four All-Star Game appearances at Anaheim Stadium on July 11. He came into the contest in relief of Chris Short in the 11th. Of the seven batters he faced, the only baserunner he allowed in the two shutout innings he pitched was Carl Yastrzemski, who recorded a 12th-inning single. The NL eventually won 2–1 in 15 innings. On July 24, Cuellar had held the Phillies to one hit and no runs through eight innings, as Houston led 1–0. During the ninth, Philadelphia manager Gene Mauch called him a name from the dugout, hoping to start a fight and get both players ejected. Eddie Mathews of Houston acted as a peacemaker, but Cuellar would allow an unearned run in the inning (due to a Mathews error). However, he finished the game, allowing only two hits total as Houston prevailed 2–1 in 11 innings. He threw back-to-back shutouts on September 22 and 27 against the New York Mets and Philadelphia; the latter of these was an 11-inning game in which he struck out 12. Five times Cuellar struck out 10 or more batters in a game in 1967, the most coming on June 6, when he struck out 13 in a 3–2 win over the Cardinals. Cuellar improved his record to 16–11 in 1967, with a 3.03 ERA. He tied with four other pitchers for fifth in the NL in wins and ranked fifth in strikeouts (203, the most he would ever record in a season).

After the major league seasons, Cuellar had typically played winter baseball in Latin America over the offseasons. However, the Astros asked him not to do so in the 1967-68 offseason because they thought he was pitching too much. When he returned to the team in 1968, he complained of arm soreness. He pitched only once in April and did not make a start until May 19. Cuellar won his first three starts. On May 30, he threw a seven-hit shutout against the Braves in an 11–0 victory. He struck out a season-high 12 on June 21 and held the Phillies to one unearned run in a complete game, 2–1 victory. With a four-hit shutout of the Dodgers on July 29, Cuellar's record improved to 6–5. However, he lost five straight decisions, not winning again until September 17. In 28 games (24 starts), he had an 8–11 record, though his ERA was 2.74. He struck out 133 batters in 170 2/3 innings. On December 4, the Astros traded Cuellar, Enzo Hernández, and Tom Johnson to the Baltimore Orioles for Curt Blefary and John Mason.

=== Baltimore Orioles (1969–76) ===
==== 1969–71 ====
With Baltimore, Cuellar "blossomed into a star," according to reporter Matt Schudel. As the pitcher joined fellow starters Jim Palmer and Dave McNally, and sluggers Frank Robinson, Brooks Robinson and Boog Powell, the Orioles began a three-year run atop the American League (AL) in 1969. In his Baltimore debut on April 10, he pitched 10 innings and allowed just one unearned run against the Boston Red Sox. Though he did not get a decision, the Orioles prevailed 2–1 in 13 innings. He threw 10 innings in another game on April 23 (this one a 3–2 win over the Tigers), then threw a shutout against the Yankees four days later. Facing the Kansas City Royals on May 10, he threw a two-hit shutout in a 5–0 victory. On June 17 and 21, Cuellar pitched a pair of complete-game four-hit, one-run victories, striking out 12 and nine batters respectively. He held the Red Sox to three hits on July 12 in a 4–0 shutout. In August, Cuellar retired 35 batters in a row. The streak was ended on August 10 by César Tovar of the Minnesota Twins, as Cuellar was three outs away from recording his first career no-hitter; Tovar's hit, which came in the top of ninth inning, was the only one the Twins would manage against Cuellar in his complete-game shutout (a 2–0 victory). He won seven straight games from July 24 through August 19 (the last of which was a shutout of the California Angels), then won six straight from August 27 to September 18.

During the 1969 season, Cuellar achieved a win–loss record of 23–11, struck out 182 batters, and recorded a 2.38 ERA, as Baltimore won a club-record 109 games and the very first AL East Division title. (Note: Prior to the season, both the American League and National League had added two teams and been divided into six-team East and West Divisions.) Cuellar's 23 wins ranked second in the AL to Denny McLain's 24, his 2.38 ERA ranked third (behind Dick Bosman's 2.19 and Palmer's 2.34), and his 182 strikeouts tied Joe Coleman for fifth. His five shutouts were third behind McLain's nine and Palmer's six. For his outstanding year, Cuellar tied McLain for the AL Cy Young Award. (Note: Note that following this tie in the voting, the system for voting was changed in a way that made ties in the voting far more unlikely. No two pitchers have tied for the Cy Young Award in either Major League since.) Cuellar became the first pitcher born in Latin America to win the Cy Young Award. He also finished eighth in AL Most Valuable Player (MVP) voting.

The Orioles faced the Minnesota Twins in the American League Championship Series. In Game 1, Cuellar allowed three runs (two earned) in eight innings, leaving with his team trailing 3–2. Baltimore tied it in the ninth on a Boog Powell home run, then scored the winning run in the 12th on a Paul Blair RBI single to win the game 4–3. The Orioles went on to sweep the Twins three games to none en route to winning the American League Pennant and earning a berth in the World Series against the New York Mets. Cuellar again got the start in Game 1, allowing one run over four innings and outpitching Tom Seaver in a 4–1 victory. The two faced off again in Game 4; Cuellar pitched seven innings, allowing just a home run to Donn Clendenon, but the Orioles were losing 1–0 when Cuellar exited the game. Brooks Robinson tied the game with a sacrifice fly in the ninth, taking Cuellar off the hook for the loss, but the Orioles lost the game 2–1 in 10 innings. In the next game, the Mets completed one of the biggest World Series upsets ever, winning the 1969 Series four games to one against the heavily favored Orioles. Cuellar's triumph in Game One wound up being the only Baltimore victory.

On May 29, 1970, Cuellar struck out 10 batters, including four in the same inning, as he threw a four-hit shutout against the Angels. Twice in the first half of the season, he allowed only two hits in a game, on May 24 and June 11 (both Oriole wins). He threw a four-hit shutout against the Tigers on July 3, then pitched all 10 innings of a 6–2 victory over the Yankees four days later. Cuellar made the All-Star team for the second time, picked by Weaver, who was managing the team. Through June, his ERA was 4.34 (though his record was 8–5), but Cuellar only lost three times for the rest of the season while winning 16 more games and posting a 2.78 ERA. On August 11, he threw a four-hit shutout against the Angels for the second time that season. On August 27, Cuellar became the second pitcher in the AL (after teammate McNally) to win 20 games, allowing 10 hits but earning the win in a 6–4 victory over the Athletics. He threw his fourth shutout of the season on September 9, necessary for Baltimore's 1–0 victory over the Yankees. Cuellar's win–loss record was 24–8 in 1970; he recorded a 3.48 ERA and 190 strikeouts. Cuellar's 24 wins tied with McNally and Jim Perry for the major league lead. He led the AL in games started (40, tied with four others), and complete games (21), also ranking among the AL leaders in strikeouts (fifth), shutouts (four, tied with two others for third), and innings pitched (297 2/3, third, behind Palmer and Sam McDowell's 305). However, Cuellar finished in fourth place in the voting for the American League Cy Young Award. "He should have won the Cy that year, but not doing so never affected his performance," teammate Palmer opined. In the AL MVP voting, Cuellar finished 11th. Cuellar, Palmer, and McNally combined for 68 wins, the most for a starting trio since three Detroit Tigers did so in 1944.

The Orioles faced the Twins again in the ALCS, and Cuellar started Game 1. Struggling on the mound in the cold weather at Metropolitan Stadium, he surrendered six runs in 4 1/3 innings. However, he contributed offensively in the fourth inning, when he hit a pitch from Jim Perry that barely stayed fair as it passed over the right field fence for a grand slam. The Orioles won 10–6, then went on to sweep the Twins for the second year in a row.

Cuellar had a rocky start in Game 2 of the 1970 World Series against the Reds, lasting only 2 1/3 innings and giving up four runs (though only one was earned). However, Baltimore rallied to win the game 6–5. In Game 5, Cuellar was hit hard early, giving up three runs to the Reds in the first inning. It was then that his pitching coach, George Bamberger, advised Cuellar to stop throwing his screwball for the rest of the game. Cuellar settled himself down and followed Bamberger's advice by relying on his fastball, curveball, and changeup, to shut out the Reds for the next eight innings for an impressive 9-3 complete game victory that clinched the World Series title for the Orioles. Forty years later, reporter Mike Klingaman wrote, "Of his 185 big league victories, none meant more than that World Series win to Cuellar."

Facing the Indians in his second start of the year on April 14, 1971, Cuellar only struck out two batters but only allowed four hits in a 3–0 shutout win. He took pleasure in a complete game, 3–2 win over the Indians on May 26. Earlier in the year, Cleveland manager Alvin Dark had said that Cuellar's fastball "couldn't blacken an eye." He won 11 decisions in a row from May 12 through July 8, posting a 2.17 ERA in that span. The first of these was a 6–0 shutout of the Kansas City Royals on May 12 in which Jerry May had the only hit off of him, a third-inning single. He shut out the Milwaukee Brewers on June 4, then held the Minnesota Twins to one run in a complete game, 2–1 victory five days later. Teammate Pat Dobson was so impressed with Cuellar's success, he started wearing his socks for good luck. With a 13–1 record and a 2.88 ERA in the first half, Cuellar was selected to his third All-Star Game. In the second half, he was only 7–8, but his ERA was 3.34. Against the Twins on August 10, he gave up Harmon Killebrew's 500th home run. He held the White Sox to four hits on August 24 in a 1–0 shutout. In 1971, Cuellar's regular-season win–loss record was 20–9, and he had a 3.08 ERA and 124 strikeouts. His 20 wins tied with four others for sixth in the AL, his four shutouts were tied with 10 others for seventh, his 292 1/3 innings pitched were fourth in the AL (behind Mickey Lolich's 376, Wilbur Wood's 334, and Vida Blue's 312), and his 21 complete games were also fourth (behind Lolich's 29, Blue's 24, and Wood's 22). Palmer and McNally each won 20 games again, and newcomer Dobson did so as well, making the Orioles the first team to have four twenty-game winners since the 1921 Chicago White Sox. Though Cuellar did not get any Cy Young votes, he finished 24th in AL MVP voting.

This year in the ALCS, the Orioles faced the Athletics instead of the Twins. Cuellar started Game 2, allowing just one run and six hits in a complete game, 5–1 victory. The Orioles swept the ALCS for the third year in a row and earned a berth in the World Series against the Pirates. In Game 3, Cuellar allowed five runs (four earned) in six innings, suffering the defeat in the 5–1 loss. He allowed just two runs over eight innings in Game 7, but Steve Blass of the Pirates allowed only one run, and Pittsburgh won the series as Cuellar suffered a difficult loss.

==== 1972–76 ====
On May 26, 1972, Cuellar threw a four-hit shutout in a 2–0 victory over the Indians. He won only two of his first nine games in 1972, though his ERA was 3.50. After June 4, he posted a 16–7 record for the rest of the year, with a 2.36 ERA. Though striking out only two Yankees on June 28, he allowed five hits and no runs in a 4–0 shutout. A little over a month later, he allowed just three hits in a 5–0 shutout of the Yankees on July 30. On August 11, he struck out a season-high 13 batters in a 2–1 win over Boston. From August 25 through September 16, he won five straight decisions for the Orioles. Nine shutout innings on September 3 were not enough for a win as the Angels scored a run against Eddie Watt in the 10th to win 1–0, but Cuellar threw nine more shutout innings four days later, getting credit for the win this time in a 9–0 victory over the Tigers. In 35 starts, he had an 18–12 record, a 2.57 ERA, and 132 strikeouts in 248 1/3 innings pitched. His 18 wins were tied with Clyde Wright for 10th in the AL.

Cuellar got off to a 2–6 start in 1973, posting a 5.00 ERA through June 9. Afterwards, he went 16–7, posting a 2.56 ERA. He held the Texas Rangers to three hits on June 15 in a 1–0 shutout. Ten days later, he pitched all 12 innings of a 4–3 win over the Brewers. On July 19, he struck out 12 batters and pitched all 11 innings of a 3–1 victory over the Angels. He threw a five-hit shutout against the White Sox on August 18 in a 3–0 victory. From August 9 through September 1, he won six starts in a row; after losing on September 5, he won his last four decisions of the year. On September 17, he allowed four runs (two earned) and struck out nine as he pitched all 10 innings of a 5–4 win over the Yankees. In 38 starts, he had an 18–13 record, a 3.27 ERA, and 140 strikeouts in 267 innings. After a one-year absence from the playoffs, the Orioles won the AL East again, facing the defending World Series Champion Athletics in the ALCS. The starter for Game 3, Cuellar pitched every inning of an 11-inning game, matching pace with Ken Holtzman of the Athletics for 10 innings before finally giving up a game-ending home run to Bert Campaneris in a 2–1 loss. The Athletics won the series in five games.

During 1974 spring training, Cuellar began parking in a special spot in the reporters-only parking lot, perhaps thinking that The Cuban Star referred to him. "Who else is Cuban star on this club?" he asked. Despite a broken toe, he was ready for the start of the season. After losing all three of his April decisions, he won nine straight decisions before finally suffering another loss on June 21. Included in that streak were two shutouts: a rain-shortened seven-inning game against Boston on May 17 and a 1–0 victory over the Twins on June 17. Against the Yankees on June 30, Cuellar struck out only one batter but threw a six-hit shutout in a June 30. He was selected to the All-Star Game for the fourth time in his career. On August 15, he struck out a season-high 10 batters and held the White Sox to six hits and one run in a complete game, 2–1 victory. After a loss on August 24, Cuellar won seven of his last nine games, and the two he did not get the decision in were also Oriole victories. In early September, Cuellar, Palmer, McNally, and Ross Grimsley set an AL record with five consecutive shutouts. Cuellar threw two in the streak, both 1–0 victories. Cuellar had a great season in 1974, finishing with a win–loss record of 22–10, a 3.11 ERA, and 106 strikeouts. He led the AL in winning percentage with a .688 mark, and his 22 wins were third in the league behind Hunter's and Fergie Jenkins's 25. Cuellar pitched 20 complete games (tied with Steve Busby for eighth), including five shutouts (tied with Jim Bibby for fourth), as he earned a sixth-place finish in the Cy Young Award voting. From 1969 through 1974, Cuellar's .665 winning percentage was the best in the major leagues.

Again, the Orioles won the Eastern Division and faced the Athletics in the ALCS. In Game 1, Cuellar gave up three runs over eight innings, pitching craftily and earning the victory as the Orioles won 6–3. He allowed just one hit in Game 4, but his control was not good; he walked nine hitters and was lifted in the fifth inning after walking in a run. The Athletics only scored one more all game, but that was enough for a series-clinching, 2–1 win. It would be Cuellar's final postseason start; in playoff games, he had gone 4–4 and posted a 2.85 ERA.

In Cuellar's second start of 1975 on April 16, he allowed just three hits in a 2–0 shutout of the Brewers. On May 31, a third-inning single by Bruce Bochte was the only hit Cuellar allowed in a 1–0, shutout victory over the Angels. He gave up six hits in a shutout of the Red Sox on June 22, a 6–0 victory in the first game of a doubleheader. After the Tigers knocked Cuellar out in the second inning of a game on June 26, 1975, he returned three days later and held Detroit to five hits and one run in a complete game, 2–1 victory. On July 26, he took a no-hitter into the seventh inning against the Brewers and finished with one hit allowed (a single to George Scott) and 10 strikeouts in a 4–0 victory over the Brewers. He allowed just two hits on August 11 in a 4–0 shutout of the Royals. On September 2, in the first game of a doubleheader against Cleveland, he pitched all 10 innings, allowing 11 hits but just two runs as the Orioles won 3–2. Cuellar's ERA in 1975 was 3.66, the highest it had been since 1964-though his five shutouts tied his career high, his pitching was not as consistent as usual. He had a 14–12 record and struck out 105 batters in 256 innings. The five shutouts tied with three others for third in the AL, behind Palmer's 10 and Hunter's seven.

By 1976, Cuellar was 39 years old, and his age negatively impacted his performance. He did shut out the Rangers on June 20, limiting Texas to three hits in a 2–0 victory. After posting a 4–12 record and a 5.14 ERA through the end of July, he was moved to the bullpen. He made five relief appearances for the Orioles in August, then did not pitch at all once the Orioles made their September call-ups. In 26 games (19 starts), he had a 4–13 record, a 4.96 ERA, and 32 strikeouts in 107 innings pitched. He was released on December 21, ending his eight-year tenure with the Orioles. With the Orioles, Cuellar would enjoy three consecutive 20-win seasons.

=== California Angels (1977), later career ===
On January 25, 1977, Cuellar was signed by the California Angels. Harry Dalton, their general manager (GM), was friends with Cuellar from his time as the Orioles' GM previously. However, Cuellar struggled in spring training and did not even appear in a regular season game until April 26, California's 19th game of the season. In a start against the Yankees on May 3, Cuellar allowed seven hits and six runs in 3 1/3 innings, taking the loss in an 8–1 defeat. He was released on May 16, having only appeared in two games. That would be the end of his major league career.

In 1979, Cuellar joined the San Juan Boricuas of the newly created independent Inter-American League. He suffered a pulled hamstring in his third start but continued to appear in games despite the injury. Plagued by financial troubles and visa issues, the league folded on June 30. Cuellar continued to play in Puerto Rican winter leagues and the Mexican League through 1983 before retiring for good. While in Puerto Rico in 1983, he taught Willie Hernández how to throw a screwball. Hernández would win the AL Cy Young and MVP Awards in 1984.

During his 15-season career, Cuellar had a win–loss record of 185–130 with a 3.14 ERA, 1,632 strikeouts, 172 complete games, 36 shutouts, and 11 saves in 453 games and 2,808 innings pitched. In five American League Championship Series and three World Series appearances, Cuellar pitched in 12 games, winning four games and losing four with a 2.85 ERA while recording 56 strikeouts.

== Pitching style ==
Cuellar was a "junkball" pitcher, relying heavily on his excellent screwball and change-up rather than a hard fastball, according to Baltimore Sun reporter Mike Klingaman. Klingaman observed that by cleverly selecting which pitches to throw, Cuellar set up hitters for strikeouts. Fellow Oriole pitcher Dick Hall recalled: "To watch him pitch was amazing. It seemed like every time hitters took a pitch, it was right at the knees for a strike, and if they swung, it wasn't." Sports Illustrated said he had "the trickiest screwball since Carl Hubbell." In 2016, they said he had the fifth-best screwball of all time. Ken McMullen of the Angels said: "Cuellar's screwball is a pitch nobody else in baseball throws, and he can change speeds on it". "Miguel was a magician out there," said Oriole first baseman Boog Powell. "He made hitters look comical, like they could have swung three times before the ball got there. A couple of times, I almost had to call time-out because I was laughing my head off." He tended to struggle early in a season, then pitch better as the weather got warmer. "Cold weather no good for baseball or me," he said. Usually he displayed a quiet personality and worked quickly on the mound, but struggles could occasionally cause him to lose his temper.

== Personal life ==
When Cuellar joined the Orioles, he was in the process of breaking up with his wife, and he was struggling with debt. He divorced soon after he joined the team, leaving his wife and 2 children, and the Orioles helped rectify his financial issues. Shortly after joining Baltimore, he married Myriam, who would be his wife for the rest of his life. He had two additional children: Lydia and Mike, Jr. The Toronto Blue Jays signed Mike Jr. his first son, as a minor league pitcher in 1978, and he spent five years in their organization, advancing as far as Double-A with the Knoxville Blue Jays.

After his baseball career ended, Cuellar resided in the Orlando, Florida, metropolitan area. He worked at a golf course, also helping out during Orioles' spring training each year. For a while, he was a pitching coach in Puerto Rico, and he served as an instructor for the Orioles in the latter years of his life. He also was a frequent attendee when the Orioles had team reunions.

On April 2, 2010, Cuellar died of stomach cancer at the Orlando Regional Medical Center. He was the third of the Orioles' four 20-game winners in 1971 to perish, following Dave McNally in 2002 and Pat Dobson in 2006. Only Jim Palmer survives them.

== Legacy ==
Along with Palmer and McNally, Cuellar gave the Orioles one of the best starting rotations in history during the late 1960s and early 1970s. Blair recalled that "With Cuellar, McNally, and Palmer, you could almost ring up 60 wins for us when the season started because each of them was going to win 20. And with Cuellar and McNally, you never knew they were winning 10-0 or losing 0-10. They were the same guys. They were two really great left-handers, and the reason they were so great was they didn't have the talent Palmer had. They didn't have the 95-mile-per-hour fastball Palmer had. They had to learn to pitch, know the hitters, hit corners, and they did it. And they never complained. Those kind of guys, you just die for. You break your neck to go out there and win for them.” Palmer remembered him as "like an artist. He could paint a different picture every time he went out there. He could finesse you. He could curveball you to death or screwball you to death. From 1969 to ’74, he was probably the best left-hander in the American League.”

Cuellar ranks among Baltimore's top five career leaders in wins (143, fourth behind Palmer's 268, McNally's 181, and Mike Mussina's 147), strikeouts (1,011, fifth), shutouts (30, third behind Palmer's 53 and McNally's 33) and innings pitched (fifth, 2,028). He trails only Dave McNally among left-handers in wins and shutouts. He is among the Orioles' single-season records in other categories, as well. His 24 wins in 1970 are tied for second-most behind Steve Stone's 25 in 1981, and Cuellar holds two of the other top 10 win seasons as well (his 23 in 1969 are tied for sixth, and his 22 in 1974 are tied for ninth). He is one of four Orioles to make 40 starts in a season.

"Crazy Horse" was a nickname given Cuellar by his Oriole teammates because of his superstitious nature. Each game, he would sit in the same place on the team bench. He stayed in the dugout until his catcher put his gear on, refused to step on the foul line, and refrained from signing autographs on days he was pitching. In 1969, early success in games in which coach Jim Frey caught his pregame warmup pitches caused Cuellar to insist that Frey catch his pregame warmups for the rest of the year. During a game against the Indians on May 26, 1972, Cuellar twice refused to catch a baseball thrown to him. When Boog Powell finally got him to catch it on a third try, Cuellar asked for a new ball, which he also refused to catch until Bobby Grich finally rolled it to the mound. When he forgot his lucky cap on a road trip to Milwaukee, the Orioles had it airmailed to him before Cuellar's start.

In 1982, Cuellar was inducted into the Baltimore Orioles Hall of Fame.

== See also ==
- List of Houston Astros team records
- List of Major League Baseball annual wins leaders
- List of Major League Baseball single-inning strikeout leaders
