= 1973 Baltimore Orioles season =

Major League Baseball season

1973 Baltimore Orioles
- American League East champions
- League: American League
- Division: East
- Ballpark: Memorial Stadium
- City: Baltimore, Maryland
- Record: 97–65 (.599)
- Divisional place: 1st
- Owners: Jerold Hoffberger
- General managers: Frank Cashen
- Managers: Earl Weaver
- Television: WJZ-TV
- Radio: WBAL (AM) (Chuck Thompson, Bill O'Donnell)

The 1973 Baltimore Orioles season was the 73rd season in Baltimore Orioles franchise history, the 20th in Baltimore, and the 20th at Memorial Stadium. The Orioles finished first in the American League East with a record of 97 wins and 65 losses. They went on to lose to the Oakland Athletics in the 1973 American League Championship Series, three games to two.

The Orioles sustained a net operating loss of $700,000.

== Offseason ==
- October 27, 1972: Frank Estrada was traded by the Orioles to the Chicago Cubs for Elrod Hendricks.
- November 30, 1972: Johnny Oates, Pat Dobson, Roric Harrison, and Davey Johnson were traded by the Orioles to the Atlanta Braves for Earl Williams and Taylor Duncan.
- January 10, 1973: John Flinn was drafted by the Orioles in the 2nd round of the 1973 Major League Baseball draft, secondary phase.
- February 2, 1973: Don Buford was released by the Orioles.

== Regular season ==
=== Season standings ===
AL East
Team	W	L	Pct.	GB	Home	Road
Baltimore Orioles	97	65	.599	—	50‍–‍31	47‍–‍34
Boston Red Sox	89	73	.549	8	48‍–‍33	41‍–‍40
Detroit Tigers	85	77	.525	12	47‍–‍34	38‍–‍43
New York Yankees	80	82	.494	17	50‍–‍31	30‍–‍51
Milwaukee Brewers	74	88	.457	23	40‍–‍41	34‍–‍47
Cleveland Indians	71	91	.438	26	34‍–‍47	37‍–‍44

=== Record vs. opponents ===
1973 American League record Sources:
Team	BAL	BOS	CAL	CWS	CLE	DET	KC	MIL	MIN	NYY	OAK	TEX
Baltimore	—	7–11	6–6	8–4	12–6	9–9	8–4	15–3	8–4	9–9	5–7	10–2
Boston	11–7	—	7–5	6–6	9–9	3–15	8–4	12–6	6–6	14–4	4–8	9–3
California	6–6	5–7	—	8–10	5–7	7–5	10–8	5–7	10–8	6–6	6–12	11–7
Chicago	4–8	6–6	10–8	—	7–5	5–7	6–12	3–9	9–9	8–4	6–12	13–5
Cleveland	6–12	9–9	7–5	5–7	—	9–9	2–10	9–9	7–5	7–11	3–9	7–5
Detroit	9–9	15–3	5–7	7–5	9–9	—	4–8	12–6	5–7	7–11	7–5	5–7
Kansas City	4–8	4–8	8–10	12–6	10–2	8–4	—	8–4	9–9	6–6	8–10	11–7
Milwaukee	3–15	6–12	7–5	9–3	9–9	6–12	4–8	—	8–4	10–8	4–8	8–4
Minnesota	4–8	6–6	8–10	9–9	5–7	7–5	9–9	4–8	—	3–9	14–4	12–6
New York	9–9	4–14	6–6	4–8	11–7	11–7	6–6	8–10	9–3	—	4–8	8–4
Oakland	7–5	8–4	12–6	12–6	9–3	5–7	10–8	8–4	4–14	8–4	—	11–7
Texas	2–10	3–9	7–11	5–13	5–7	7–5	7–11	4–8	6–12	4–8	7–11	—

=== Notable transactions ===
- April 5, 1973: Tom Matchick was traded by the Orioles to the New York Yankees for Frank Baker.
- June 5, 1973: Mike Flanagan was drafted by the Orioles in the 7th round of the 1973 Major League Baseball draft.
- July 18, 1973: Curt Motton was signed as a free agent by the Orioles.

=== Roster ===
1973 Baltimore Orioles
Roster
Pitchers: 13 Doyle Alexander; 35 Mike Cuellar; 17 Wayne Garland; 44 Don Hood; 23 Grant Jackson; 38 Jesse Jefferson; 19 Dave McNally; 22 Jim Palmer; 27 Orlando Peña; 34 Bob Reynolds; 16 Mickey Scott; 39 Eddie Watt	Catchers: 8 Andy Etchebarren; 10 Elrod Hendricks; 10 Sergio Robles; 32 Earl Williams; Infielders: 15 Frank Baker; 7 Mark Belanger; 21 Larry Brown; 24 Enos Cabell; 12 Tommy Davis; 37 Doug DeCinces; 3 Bobby Grich; 26 Boog Powell; 5 Brooks Robinson	Outfielders: 25 Don Baylor; 6 Paul Blair; 1 Al Bumbry; 2 Rich Coggins; 11 Terry Crowley; 18 Jim Fuller; 21 Curt Motton; 14 Merv Rettenmund	Manager: 4 Earl Weaver; Coaches: 31 George Bamberger; 41 Jim Frey; 55 Billy Hunter; 48 George Staller

== Player stats ==
= Indicates team leader

=== Batting ===
==== Starters by position ====
Note: Pos = Position; G = Games played; AB = At bats; H = Hits; Avg. = Batting average; HR = Home runs; RBI = Runs batted in

Pos	Player	G	AB	H	Avg.	HR	RBI
C	Earl Williams	132	459	109	.237	22	83
1B	Boog Powell	114	370	98	.265	11	54
2B	Bobby Grich	162	581	146	.251	12	50
3B	Brooks Robinson	155	549	141	.257	9	72
SS	Mark Belanger	154	470	106	.226	0	27
LF	Don Baylor	118	405	116	.286	11	51
CF	Paul Blair	144	500	140	.280	10	64
RF	Merv Rettenmund	95	321	84	.262	9	44
DH	Tommy Davis	137	552	169	.306	7	89

==== Other batters ====
Note: G = Games played; AB = At bats; H = Hits; Avg. = Batting average; HR = Home runs; RBI = Runs batted in

Player	G	AB	H	Avg.	HR	RBI
Rich Coggins	110	389	124	.319	7	41
Al Bumbry	110	356	120	.337	7	34
Andy Etchebarren	54	152	39	.257	2	23
Terry Crowley	54	131	27	.206	3	15
Elrod Hendricks	41	101	18	.178	3	15
Frank Baker	44	63	12	.190	1	11
Enos Cabell	32	47	10	.213	1	3
Larry Brown	17	28	7	.250	1	5
Jim Fuller	9	26	3	.115	2	4
Doug DeCinces	10	18	2	.111	0	3
Sergio Robles	8	13	1	.077	0	0
Curt Motton	5	6	2	.333	1	4

=== Pitching ===
==== Starting pitchers ====
Note: G = Games pitched; IP = Innings pitched; W = Wins; L = Losses; ERA = Earned run average; SO = Strikeouts

Player	G	IP	W	L	ERA	SO
Jim Palmer	38	296.1	22	9	2.40	158
Mike Cuellar	38	267.0	18	13	3.27	140
Dave McNally	38	266.0	17	17	3.21	87
Doyle Alexander	29	174.2	12	8	3.86	63
Jesse Jefferson	18	100.2	6	5	4.11	52

==== Other pitchers ====
Note: G = Games pitched; IP = Innings pitched; W = Wins; L = Losses; ERA = Earned run average; SO = Strikeouts

Player	G	IP	W	L	ERA	SO
Orlando Peña	11	44.2	1	1	4.03	23
Don Hood	8	32.1	3	2	3.90	18
Wayne Garland	4	16.0	0	1	3.94	10

==== Relief pitchers ====
Note: G = Games pitched; W = Wins; L = Losses; SV = Saves; ERA = Earned run average; SO = Strikeouts

Player	G	W	L	SV	ERA	SO
Grant Jackson	45	8	0	9	1.90	47
Bob Reynolds	42	7	5	9	1.95	77
Eddie Watt	30	3	4	5	3.30	38
Mickey Scott	1	0	0	0	5.40	2

== Postseason ==
=== ALCS ===
==== Game 1 ====
October 6, 1973, at Memorial Stadium

Team	1	2	3	4	5	6	7	8	9	R	H	E
Oakland	0	0	0	0	0	0	0	0	0	0	5	1
Baltimore	4	0	0	0	0	0	1	1	X	6	12	0
W: Jim Palmer (1–0) L: Vida Blue (0–1)
HR: None

==== Game 2 ====
October 7, 1973, at Memorial Stadium

Team	1	2	3	4	5	6	7	8	9	R	H	E
Oakland	1	0	0	0	0	2	0	2	1	6	9	0
Baltimore	1	0	0	0	0	1	0	1	0	3	8	0
W: Catfish Hunter (1–0) L: Dave McNally (0–1) S: Rollie Fingers (1)
HR: OAK – Bert Campaneris (1), Joe Rudi (1), Sal Bando 2 (2)

==== Game 3 ====
October 9, 1973, at Oakland Coliseum

Team	1	2	3	4	5	6	7	8	9	10	11	R	H	E
Baltimore	0	1	0	0	0	0	0	0	0	0	0	1	3	0
Oakland	0	0	0	0	0	0	0	1	0	0	1	2	4	3
W: Ken Holtzman (1–0) L: Mike Cuellar (0–1)
HR: OAK – Bert Campaneris (2) BAL – Earl Williams (1)

==== Game 4 ====
October 10, 1973, at Oakland Coliseum

Team	1	2	3	4	5	6	7	8	9	R	H	E
Baltimore	0	0	0	0	0	0	4	1	0	5	8	0
Oakland	0	3	0	0	0	1	0	0	0	4	7	0
W: Grant Jackson (1–0) L: Rollie Fingers (0–1)
HR: BAL – Andy Etchebarren (1), Bobby Grich (1)

==== Game 5 ====
October 11, 1973, at Oakland Coliseum

Team	1	2	3	4	5	6	7	8	9	R	H	E
Baltimore	0	0	0	0	0	0	0	0	0	0	5	2
Oakland	0	0	1	2	0	0	0	0	X	3	7	0
W: Catfish Hunter (2–0) L: Doyle Alexander (0–1)
HR: None

== Farm system ==
Level	Team	League	Manager
AAA	Rochester Red Wings	International League	Joe Altobelli
AA	Asheville Orioles	Southern League	Cal Ripken Sr.
A	Lodi Orioles	California League	Jimmie Schaffer
A	Miami Orioles	Florida State League	Bobby Malkmus
Rookie	Bluefield Orioles	Appalachian League	George Farson

LEAGUE CHAMPIONS: Lodi
