= 1973 Major League Baseball postseason =

1973 Major League Baseball playoffs

Tournament details
- Dates: October 6–21, 1973
- Teams: 4

Final positions
- Champions: Oakland Athletics (7th title)
- Runners-up: New York Mets

Tournament statistics
- Games played: 17
- Attendance: 796,670 (46,863 per game)
- Most HRs: Rusty Staub (NYM) (4)
- Most SBs: Bert Campaneris (OAK) (6)
- Best ERA: Rollie Fingers (OAK) (0.93)
- Most Ks (as pitcher): Tom Seaver (NYM) (35)

Awards
- MVP: Reggie Jackson (OAK)

The 1973 Major League Baseball postseason was the playoff tournament of Major League Baseball for the 1973 season. The winners of each division advance to the postseason and face each other in a League Championship Series to determine the pennant winners that face each other in the World Series.

In the American League, the Baltimore Orioles returned to the postseason for the fourth time in the past five seasons, and the Oakland Athletics made their third straight appearance.

In the National League, the Cincinnati Reds returned for the third time in the past four seasons, and the New York Mets returned for the second time in the past five seasons. This was the Mets’ last postseason appearance until 1986.

The playoffs began on October 6, 1973, and concluded on October 21, 1973, with the Athletics defeating the Mets in seven games in the 1973 World Series. The Athletics repeated as World Series champions.

== Teams ==
American League Teams National League Teams

The following teams qualified for the postseason:

=== American League ===
- Baltimore Orioles – 97–65, AL East champions
- Oakland Athletics – 94–68, AL West champions

=== National League ===
- New York Mets – 82–79, NL East champions
- Cincinnati Reds – 99–63, NL West champions

== Playoff bracket ==
League Championship Series (ALCS, NLCS)
East	Baltimore	2
West	Oakland	3
East	NY Mets	3
West	Cincinnati	2

World Series
AL	Oakland	4
NL	NY Mets	3

== American League Championship Series ==
=== Baltimore Orioles vs. Oakland Athletics ===
Oakland won the series, 3–2.

Game	Date	Score	Location	Time	Attendance
1	October 6	Oakland Athletics – 0, Baltimore Orioles – 6	Memorial Stadium	2:51	41,279
2	October 7	Oakland Athletics – 6, Baltimore Orioles – 3	Memorial Stadium	2:42	48,425
3	October 9	Baltimore Orioles – 1, Oakland Athletics – 2 (11)	Oakland-Alameda County Coliseum	2:23	34,367
4	October 10	Baltimore Orioles – 5, Oakland Athletics – 4	Oakland-Alameda County Coliseum	2:31	27,497
5	October 11	Baltimore Orioles – 0, Oakland Athletics – 3	Oakland-Alameda County Coliseum	2:11	24,265

This was the second postseason meeting between the Orioles and Athletics. They previously met in the ALCS in 1971, which the Orioles won in a sweep before falling in the World Series. This time, the Athletics returned the favor, defeating the Orioles in five games to advance to the World Series for the second year in a row (in the process denying a rematch of the 1969 World Series between the Mets and Orioles).

Jim Palmer pitched a five-hit complete-game shutout as the Orioles took Game 1. Catfish Hunter threw seven solid innings as the Athletics took Game 2 to even the series heading to Oakland. The Athletics prevailed in an long extra-inning Game 3 as Bert Campaneris hit a walk-off home run in the bottom of the eleventh. In Game 4, the Athletics led 4-0 and were nine outs away from the pennant, then the Orioles rallied - in the top of the seventh, Brooks Robinson got the Orioles on the board with an RBI single, then Andy Etchebarren hit a three-run home run to tie the game at four, and then Bobby Grich hit a solo homer in the top of the eighth to put the Orioles in the lead for good, capping off an improbable comeback to force a fifth game. However, Hunter pitched a five-hit complete-game shutout as the Athletics won 3–0 in Game 5 to secure the pennant. Game 5 was the least attended winner-take-all game in postseason history, drawing only 24,265 fans - half the capacity of Oakland Coliseum.

Both teams would meet one more time in the ALCS the next year, which the Athletics won in four games en route to completing a World Series three-peat.

The Orioles would eventually win the pennant again in 1979 over the California Angels in four games before falling in the World Series.

== National League Championship Series ==
=== New York Mets vs. Cincinnati Reds ===
New York won the series, 3–2.

Game	Date	Score	Location	Time	Attendance
1	October 6	New York Mets – 1, Cincinnati Reds – 2	Riverfront Stadium	2:00	53,431
2	October 7	New York Mets – 5, Cincinnati Reds – 0	Riverfront Stadium	2:19	54,041
3	October 8	Cincinnati Reds – 2, New York Mets – 9	Shea Stadium	2:48	53,967
4	October 9	Cincinnati Reds – 2, New York Mets – 1 (12)	Shea Stadium	3:07	50,786
5	October 10	Cincinnati Reds – 2, New York Mets – 7	Shea Stadium	2:40	50,323

This was the only NLCS between 1970 and 1980 to not feature either team from Pennsylvania.

In one of the most shocking upsets in postseason history, the 82-win Mets defeated the defending National League champions, the 99-win Reds, in five games to advance to the World Series for the second time in five years.

The Reds narrowly took Game 1 thanks to a walk-off home run from catcher Johnny Bench. In Game 2, Jon Matlack pitched a two-hit complete game shutout as the Mets won 5–0 to even the series headed to Queens. Game 3 was marred by a fight that broke out in the fifth inning, beginning with a tussle between Cincinnati's Pete Rose and New York's Bud Harrelson at second base. Players from both sides joined in a brawl that lasted for several minutes and set off rowdy fan behavior at Shea Stadium. Photographs of the fight, autographed by Rose and Harrelson, are now available at a number of Internet sites. The Mets blew out the Reds in Game 3 to take a 2–1 series lead. The Reds prevailed in a long and frustrating Game 4, thanks to a solo home run from Rose in the top of the twelfth. In Game 5, the Mets blew out the Reds again to clinch the pennant, completing a massive upset. The 1973 Mets' 82-wins remains the lowest of any pennant winner in MLB history.

The Reds would return to the NLCS two years later, where they swept their archrival in the Pittsburgh Pirates en route to a World Series title.

In 2023, the Mets’ upset of the Reds in the 1973 NLCS was ranked as the fifth biggest upset in postseason history by MLB.com. The Mets would win their next pennant in 1986 over the Houston Astros in six games en route to a World Series title.

== 1973 World Series ==
=== Oakland Athletics (AL) vs. New York Mets (NL) ===
Oakland won the series, 4–3.

Game	Date	Score	Location	Time	Attendance
1	October 13	New York Mets – 1, Oakland Athletics – 2	Oakland–Alameda County Coliseum	2:26	46,021
2	October 14	New York Mets – 10, Oakland Athletics – 7 (12)	Oakland–Alameda County Coliseum	4:13	49,151
3	October 16	Oakland Athletics – 3, New York Mets – 2 (11)	Shea Stadium	3:15	54,817
4	October 17	Oakland Athletics – 1, New York Mets – 6	Shea Stadium	2:41	54,817
5	October 18	Oakland Athletics – 0, New York Mets – 2	Shea Stadium	2:39	54,817
6	October 20	New York Mets – 1, Oakland Athletics – 3	Oakland–Alameda County Coliseum	2:07	49,333
7	October 21	New York Mets – 2, Oakland Athletics – 5	Oakland–Alameda County Coliseum	2:37	49,333

This was the third New York–California matchup in the World Series (1962, 1963). The Athletics defeated the Mets in seven games to win their second straight World Series title and seventh overall.

Game 1 was a pitchers' duel between Oakland's Ken Holtzman and New York's Jon Matlack, which was won by the former as the Athletics prevailed by a 2–1 score. Game 2 was an offensive slugfest which went into extra innings - the game remained tied at six until the top of the twelfth, when the Mets put up four runs to take the lead for good. The Athletics put up one more run in the bottom of the twelfth, but could manage no more as George Stone earned a save and helped the Mets even the series headed home to Queens. Game 3 would be another extra-innings contest, but this time the Athletics would prevail as Bert Campaneris scored Ted Kubiak with a go-ahead RBI single in the top of the eleventh. Game 3 was Willie Mays’ final postseason game. In Game 4, the Mets jumped out to a big lead early and did not relinquish it, as Matlack held the Athletics' offense to just one run scored after eight innings, evening the series at two games each. Jerry Koosman and Tug McGraw helped the Mets shutout the Athletics in Game 5 to take a 3–2 series lead headed back to Oakland, now one win away from pulling off an even bigger upset than what they accomplished in 1969. However, their lead would not hold. Catfish Hunter outdueled the Mets' Tom Seaver as the Athletics won Game 6 by a 3–1 score, forcing a seventh game. Game 7 was yet another pitcher's duel between Holtzman and Matlack, who were both on three-days rest, and once again Holtzman prevailed as he and closer Darold Knowles helped the Athletics win by a 5–2 score to repeat as World Series champions.

This was the second of four championships the Athletics won during their time in Oakland. The Athletics would successfully pull off a three-peat the next year, defeating their cross-state rivals in the Los Angeles Dodgers in five games.

The Mets would return to the World Series in 1986, and defeated the Boston Red Sox in seven games after being a strike away from elimination twice in Game 6 and ten outs away from elimination in Game 7.

== Broadcasting ==
NBC televised all postseason games nationally in the United States. Each team's local broadcaster also televised coverage of LCS games.
