= 1973 American League Championship Series =

5th edition of Major League Baseball's American League Championship Series

Team (Wins)	Managers	Season
Oakland Athletics (3)	Dick Williams	94–68, .580, GA: 6
Baltimore Orioles (2)	Earl Weaver	97–65, .599, GA: 8
- Dates: October 6–11
- Umpires: Nestor Chylak (crew chief); Bill Haller; George Maloney; Jim Odom; Merle Anthony; Larry McCoy

Broadcast
- Television: NBC; KTVU (OAK); WJZ-TV (BAL)
- TV announcers: NBC: Jim Simpson and Maury Wills (Game 1); Curt Gowdy and Tony Kubek (in Oakland) (NBC did not televise Game 2 due to conflicts with its NFL coverage.); KTVU: Monte Moore and Jim Woods; WJZ-TV: Chuck Thompson and Bill O'Donnell

The 1973 American League Championship Series was a semifinal matchup in Major League Baseball's 1973 postseason which took place between October 6 and 11, 1973. The Oakland Athletics defeated the Baltimore Orioles, three games to two. Games 1 and 2 were played in Memorial Stadium in Baltimore; Games 3–5 were played at the Oakland Coliseum. It was the second match-up between the two teams in the ALCS.

== Summary ==
=== Oakland Athletics vs. Baltimore Orioles ===
Oakland won the series, 3–2.

Game	Date	Score	Location	Time	Attendance
1	October 6	Oakland Athletics – 0, Baltimore Orioles – 6	Memorial Stadium	2:51	41,279
2	October 7	Oakland Athletics – 6, Baltimore Orioles – 3	Memorial Stadium	2:42	48,425
3	October 9	Baltimore Orioles – 1, Oakland Athletics – 2 (11)	Oakland-Alameda County Coliseum	2:23	34,367
4	October 10	Baltimore Orioles – 5, Oakland Athletics – 4	Oakland-Alameda County Coliseum	2:31	27,497
5	October 11	Baltimore Orioles – 0, Oakland Athletics – 3	Oakland-Alameda County Coliseum	2:11	24,265

== Game summaries ==
=== Game 1 ===
October 6, 1973 1:00 pm (ET) at Memorial Stadium in Baltimore, Maryland
Team	1	2	3	4	5	6	7	8	9	R	H	E
Oakland	0	0	0	0	0	0	0	0	0	0	5	1
Baltimore	4	0	0	0	0	0	1	1	X	6	12	0
WP: Jim Palmer (1–0) LP: Vida Blue (0–1)

In Game 1, Jim Palmer spent 16 minutes retiring the side in the top of the first inning. He walked the first two batters and struck out the next three. The Orioles went to work against lefty Vida Blue and his successor, Horacio Piña in the bottom half. Merv Rettenmund singled and Paul Blair walked before Tommy Davis's RBI double put the Orioles up 1–0. Don Baylor then walked and one out later, Earl Williams's two-run single knocked Pina out of the game. Andy Etchebarren was hit by a pitch to load the bases and Mark Belanger's RBI single made it 4–0 Orioles. They added to their lead on Etchebarren's RBI single in the seventh and Baylor's RBI single in the eighth, both with two on off Blue Moon Odom. It was more than they needed as Palmer pitched a five-hit shutout, striking out 12 Athletics along the way.

=== Game 2 ===
October 7, 1973 2:00 pm (ET) at Memorial Stadium in Baltimore, Maryland
Team	1	2	3	4	5	6	7	8	9	R	H	E
Oakland	1	0	0	0	0	2	0	2	1	6	9	0
Baltimore	1	0	0	0	0	1	0	1	0	3	8	0
WP: Catfish Hunter (1–0) LP: Dave McNally (0–1) Sv: Rollie Fingers (1); Home runs: OAK: Bert Campaneris (1), Joe Rudi (1), Sal Bando 2 (2); BAL: None

The Orioles' ALCS winning streak was snapped at 10 in Game 2. Bert Campaneris led off the game with a home run off Dave McNally, but the Orioles tied the game in the bottom of the first when Al Bumbry drew to leadoff walk, moved to third on a single and scored on Tommy Davis's groundout. Back-to-back home runs leading off the sixth by Joe Rudi and Sal Bando off McNally put the Athletics up 3–1. In the bottom half, the Orioles got back-to-back leadoff singles before Earl Williams's one-out RBI double cut Oakland's lead to 3–2. Bando's second home run of the game in the eighth off McNally padded Oakland's lead to 5–2. The Orioles hit two singles in the bottom half off Catfish Hunter, who was relieved by Rollie Fingers and Brooks Robinson's RBI single made it 5–3 Oakland, but they got that run back in the ninth when Angel Mangual hit a leadoff single off Bob Reynolds, moved to third on a sacrifice bunt and passed ball, and scored on Campaneris's single. Hunter, who served up so many during the season that he threatened an A.L. record, allowed none as the Athletics evened the series as the two teams headed to Oakland for Game 3.

=== Game 3 ===
October 9, 1973 12:30 pm (PT) at Oakland-Alameda County Coliseum in Oakland, California
Team	1	2	3	4	5	6	7	8	9	10	11	R	H	E
Baltimore	0	1	0	0	0	0	0	0	0	0	0	1	3	0
Oakland	0	0	0	0	0	0	0	1	0	0	1	2	4	3
WP: Ken Holtzman (1–0) LP: Mike Cuellar (0–1); Home runs: BAL: Earl Williams (1); OAK: Bert Campaneris (2)

The third game, postponed a day by inclement weather—the postponement trigged a rhubarb between American League President Joe Cronin and Athletics President Charlie Finley—was played at Oakland and produced a brilliant pitching battle between a pair of southpaws, Mike Cuellar of Baltimore and Ken Holtzman. Up to that point, Cuellar had allowed only three hits. he had a one-hit shutout for the first seven innings as he carefully nursed a 1–0 lead given him by Earl Williams' homer in the second inning. But in the eighth, pinch-hitter Jesús Alou singled and pinch-runner Allan Lewis was sacrificed to second by Mike Andrews. The play was controversial in that Cuellar appeared to have a force out at second base, but he ignored catcher Etchebarren's yells and took the safe out at first. This proved costly as, one out later, Joe Rudi singled home Lewis to tie the score. Bert Campaneris, first man up in the 11th, snapped a 1–1 tie by hitting Cuellar's second pitch over the left-field fence for a home run.

=== Game 4 ===
October 10, 1973 12:30 pm (PT) at Oakland-Alameda County Coliseum in Oakland, California
Team	1	2	3	4	5	6	7	8	9	R	H	E
Baltimore	0	0	0	0	0	0	4	1	0	5	8	0
Oakland	0	3	0	0	0	1	0	0	0	4	7	0
WP: Grant Jackson (1–0) LP: Rollie Fingers (0–1); Home runs: BAL: Andy Etchebarren (1), Bobby Grich (1); OAK: None

In Game 4, the Athletics knocked out Jim Palmer with a three-run outburst in the second inning. After a leadoff double and subsequent single, Ray Fosse's double scored two and Dick Green's double scored another. The Athletics made it 4–0 in the sixth on Fosse's bases-loaded sacrifice fly off Bob Reynolds. Vida Blue pitched six shutout innings before falling apart in the seventh. Earl Williams drew a base on balls with one out and Don Baylor followed with a single. Brooks Robinson came through with a run-producing single and Andy Etchebarren hit the next pitch for a home run, making the score 4–4. The next inning, Bobby Grich hit a home run off Rollie Fingers and that, coupled with Grant Jackson's stout relief pitching, gave the game to the Orioles.

=== Game 5 ===
October 11, 1973 12:30 pm (PT) at Oakland-Alameda County Coliseum in Oakland, California
Team	1	2	3	4	5	6	7	8	9	R	H	E
Baltimore	0	0	0	0	0	0	0	0	0	0	5	2
Oakland	0	0	1	2	0	0	0	0	X	3	7	0
WP: Catfish Hunter (2–0) LP: Doyle Alexander (0–1)

A surprisingly small crowd of 24,265 showed up for the final game - the lowest attendance mark ever for a winner-take-all postseason game, and they saw Catfish Hunter pitch a five-hit shutout, winning 3–0. The Athletics first run in the game come in the third inning when Ray Fosse reached first on an error by third baseman Brooks Robinson, moved to second on a sacrifice bunt, and scored on a single by Joe Rudi. Right-hander Doyle Alexander lasted only until the fourth inning. In that frame he was the victim of a single by Gene Tenace, who scored on a triple by Vic Davalillo before Jesus Alou added an RBI single. He was relieved by Palmer, who shut out Oakland the rest of the way, but the Orioles were helpless against Hunter's powerful pitching as the Athletics advanced to the World Series.

Pitching dominated the 5-game set, the victorious Athletics batting only .200 while the O's hit just .211. This was the last year both League Championship Series went to a winner-take-all game in the five-game format era (1969–1984). The day before the New York Mets upset the Cincinnati Reds to advance to their second World Series appearance in franchise history.

== Composite box ==
1973 ALCS (3–2): Oakland Athletics over Baltimore Orioles

Team	1	2	3	4	5	6	7	8	9	10	11	R	H	E
Oakland Athletics	1	3	1	2	0	3	0	3	1	0	1	15	32	4
Baltimore Orioles	5	1	0	0	0	1	5	3	0	0	0	15	36	2
Total attendance: 175,833 Average attendance: 35,167
