= Ray Fosse =

American baseball player and broadcast commentator (1947–2021)

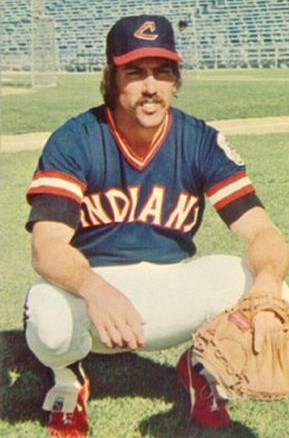
- Catcher
- Born: April 4, 1947; Marion, Illinois, U.S.
- Died: October 13, 2021 (aged 74); Oakland, California, U.S.
- Batted: Right Threw: Right

MLB debut
- September 8, 1967, for the Cleveland Indians

Last MLB appearance
- September 30, 1979, for the Milwaukee Brewers

MLB statistics
- Batting average: .256
- Home runs: 61
- Runs batted in: 324
- Stats at Baseball Reference

Teams
- Cleveland Indians (1967–1972); Oakland Athletics (1973–1975); Cleveland Indians (1976–1977); Seattle Mariners (1977); Milwaukee Brewers (1979)

Career highlights and awards
- 2× All-Star (1970, 1971); 2× World Series champion (1973, 1974); 2× Gold Glove Award (1970, 1971); Athletics Hall of Fame

Raymond Earl Fosse (/ˈfɔːsiː/ FAW-see; April 4, 1947 – October 13, 2021) was an American professional baseball player and television sports color commentator. He played in Major League Baseball (MLB) as a catcher from 1967 to 1979, most prominently as an All-Star player for the Cleveland Indians, and then as a two-time World Series champion with the Oakland Athletics dynasty of the early 1970s. He also played for the Seattle Mariners and the Milwaukee Brewers. After his playing career, Fosse was a popular television and radio color commentator for the Athletics.

Fosse was selected by the Indians to become the team's first draft pick when MLB implemented its first amateur draft in 1965. Fosse was a two-time All-Star and won two Gold Glove Awards in a playing career that was marred by numerous injuries. In 2001, Fosse was voted one of the 100 greatest players in Cleveland Indians' history by a panel of veteran baseball writers, executives and historians. He was named to the Oakland Athletics' 50th-anniversary team in 2018. In 2022, Fosse was posthumously inducted into the Athletics Hall of Fame.

== Early life and career ==
Fosse was born in Marion, Illinois, where he grew up listening to the St. Louis Cardinals on the radio. He considered Stan Musial to be his favorite player. Fosse played as a catcher for the Marion High School baseball team and was named the team's Most Valuable Player three consecutive years. He also played football and basketball in high school. After high school, Fosse attended Southern Illinois University.

== Professional career ==
=== Cleveland Indians ===
The Cleveland Indians selected Fosse in the first round of the 1965 MLB draft. Fosse played three seasons in the minor leagues before making his major-league debut with the Indians on September 8, 1967, at the age of 20. He returned to the minor leagues for the 1968 season, where he posted a .301 batting average in 103 games for the Portland Beavers of the Pacific Coast League.

Returning to the Indians in 1970, he platooned alongside Duke Sims. In the first half of 1970, he posted a .313 batting average with 16 home runs and 45 runs batted in. He hit in 23 consecutive games beginning June 9, the longest American League (AL) hitting streak since 1961, and was chosen as a reserve for the 1970 All-Star Game by Earl Weaver, the American League manager.

In the final play of the 1970 All-Star Game, Fosse was injured in a collision with Pete Rose at home plate. Initial X-rays revealed no fractures or other damage, although a re-examination the following year found Fosse had sustained a fractured and separated shoulder, which healed incorrectly, causing chronic pain that was never entirely resolved. Rose asserted that he was simply trying to win the game, and that Fosse — who had moved a few feet up the third-base line to receive the throw — was blocking the plate, but Rose was widely criticized for over-aggressive play in an exhibition game. Fosse went on to play 42 games in the second half of the season, hitting .297 and winning the AL Gold Glove Award, but said that he was never as good a batter after the injury.

Fosse continued to be plagued by injuries in 1971 when he was kicked in his right hand during a brawl against the Detroit Tigers on June 18, sustaining a gash that required five stitches and sidelined him for more than a week. When he returned, he tore a ligament in his left hand during an at-bat against Denny McLain, forcing him to miss the 1971 All-Star Game. Despite these injuries, Fosse appeared in 133 games and led the league's catchers in assists and in double plays to win his second consecutive Gold Glove Award. He also posted a .276 batting average and contributed 12 home runs and a career-high 62 runs batted in for the last place Indians.

Fosse's contributions at calling pitches was evident when Indians pitcher Gaylord Perry won the American League Cy Young Award in 1972. Perry gave Fosse credit for his success: "I've got to split it up and give part, a big part, to my catcher, Ray Fosse. He kept pushing me in games when I didn't have good stuff. He'd come out and show me that big fist of his when I wasn't bearing down the way he thought I should."

=== Oakland Athletics ===
Fosse was acquired along with Jack Heidemann by the Oakland Athletics from the Indians for Dave Duncan and George Hendrick on March 24, 1973. He played in 143 games that season, the most of his career, on a team with three 20-game-winning pitchers: Ken Holtzman, Vida Blue, and Catfish Hunter. Fosse guided the Athletics pitching staff to the second best team earned run average as well the second most shutouts in the American League as, the Athletics won the AL Western Division pennant by six games over the Kansas City Royals. The Athletics then defeated the Baltimore Orioles in the AL Championship Series. Fosse made his mark in the series, throwing out five would-be base stealers. The Athletics went on to win the World Series against the New York Mets.

The Athletics repeated as world champions in 1974, defeating the Los Angeles Dodgers in the World Series, but injuries once again plagued Fosse. On June 5, he suffered a crushed disc in his neck attempting to break up a locker room fight between teammates Reggie Jackson and Billy North, and spent three months on the disabled list. The Athletics won a fifth consecutive division title in 1975, but by then, Gene Tenace had replaced Fosse as the starting catcher. Fosse did participate in a combined no-hitter in the final game of the season, catching for Paul Lindblad and Rollie Fingers in the final three innings.

=== Later career ===
Fosse returned to the Indians when his contract was sold by the Athletics at the Winter Meetings on December 9, 1975. He again became the starting catcher, only to return to the disabled list after a home-plate collision with Jim Rice. When he returned he was platooned with Alan Ashby. Fosse ended the year with a .301 batting average. On May 30, 1977, he caught Dennis Eckersley's no-hitter versus the California Angels. Eckersley acknowledged Fosse's contribution to the no-hitter: "Give Fosse a lot of credit too," he said. "He called a helluva game. I think I only shook him off three times." When Jeff Torborg replaced Frank Robinson as manager of the Indians in June 1977, he again placed Fosse in a platoon role with Fred Kendall. In September, he was traded to the new Seattle Mariners.

After finishing the year with the Mariners, he signed a contract to play for the Milwaukee Brewers, but during spring training, he tripped in a hole while running down the first base line and sustained injuries to his right leg. The most serious injury required the reconstruction of a knee ligament, forcing him to miss the entire season. He came back in 1979, but played in only 19 games; in 1980, he was released at the close of spring training.

== Career statistics ==
In a 12-year MLB career, Fosse played in 924 games, accumulating 758 hits in 2,957 at bats for a .256 career batting average along with 61 home runs, 324 runs batted in, and a .301 on-base percentage. He ended his career with a .986 fielding percentage. Fosse led AL catchers in 1970 with 854 putouts and 48 baserunners caught stealing, and in range factor (7.81). In 1971 he led the league with 73 assists, and in 1973, he led AL catchers in baserunners caught stealing and in caught stealing percentage.

Fosse was a member of two World Series Champion clubs: the 1973 and 1974 A's, and also a member of the inaugural Seattle Mariners team of 1977. He won Gold Glove Awards in 1970 and 1971. Fosse was named to the 100 Greatest Cleveland Indians in 2001.

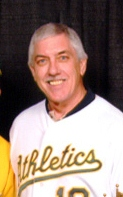
Fosse in 2012

== Television and radio career ==
From 1986 to 2021, Fosse was a color commentator for the Oakland Athletics on NBC Sports California and occasionally on Athletics radio broadcasts when a game was not on local television. In 2004, he was nominated for a Ford C. Frick Award.

== Personal life and death ==
Fosse married his wife Carol in April 1970. They maintained residences in Oakland, California, and Scottsdale, Arizona.

On August 5, 2021, Fosse revealed that he had been battling cancer for the past 16 years, and needed to step away from his job as an announcer to focus on his treatment. Fosse died of cancer on October 13, 2021, at the age of 74.
