= 1973 Oakland Athletics season =

Major League Baseball season

1973 Oakland Athletics
- World Series champions American League champions American League West champions
- League: American League
- Division: West
- Ballpark: Oakland-Alameda County Coliseum
- City: Oakland, California
- Record: 94–68 (.580)
- Owners: Charles O. Finley
- Managers: Dick Williams
- Television: KTVU
- Radio: KEEN (Monte Moore, Jim Woods, Bill Rigney)

The 1973 Oakland Athletics season was the 73rd season for the Oakland Athletics franchise, all as members of the American League, and their 6th season in Oakland. The Athletics won their third consecutive American League West title with a record of 94 wins and 68 losses. The A's went on to defeat the Baltimore Orioles in the ALCS for their second straight AL Championship, and won the World Series in seven games over the New York Mets to take their second consecutive World Championship. Before the season, the numbers on the front of the jersey were removed and wouldn't return until 1987.

== Offseason ==
- November 24, 1972: Matty Alou was traded by the Athletics to the New York Yankees for Rob Gardner and a player to be named later. The Yankees completed the deal by sending Rich McKinney to the Athletics on December 1.
- November 30, 1972: Mike Epstein was traded by the Athletics to the Texas Rangers for Horacio Piña.
- December 18, 1972: Orlando Cepeda was released by the Athletics.
- January 10, 1973: 1973 Major League Baseball draft (January Draft) notable picks:

Round 1: Mike Norris (24th pick).

Secondary Phase

Round 1: Warren Cromartie (10th pick) (did not sign).

- January 23, 1973: Jerry McNertney was signed as a free agent by the Athletics.
- March 24, 1973: Dave Duncan and George Hendrick were traded by the Athletics to the Cleveland Indians for Ray Fosse and Jack Heidemann.
- March 31, 1973: Jay Johnstone signed as a free agent with the Athletics.

== Regular season ==
The 1973 A's had three 20-game winners in Jim (Catfish) Hunter, Ken Holtzman and Vida Blue.

The A's were on the receiving end of some milestones as well. On July 3, Nolan Ryan struck out Sal Bando of the Athletics for the 1000th strikeout in his career. On July 30, Jim Bibby threw the first no-hitter in Texas Rangers history as he no-hit the Athletics. The Rangers won the game 6–0.

=== Opening Day starters ===
- Billy North, DH
- Dal Maxvill, SS
- Joe Rudi, LF
- Reggie Jackson, RF
- Sal Bando, 3B
- Gene Tenace, 1B
- Billy Conigliaro, CF
- Ray Fosse, C
- Dick Green, 2B
- Catfish Hunter, P

=== Season standings ===
AL West
Team	W	L	Pct.	GB	Home	Road
Oakland Athletics	94	68	.580	—	50‍–‍31	44‍–‍37
Kansas City Royals	88	74	.543	6	48‍–‍33	40‍–‍41
Minnesota Twins	81	81	.500	13	37‍–‍44	44‍–‍37
California Angels	79	83	.488	15	43‍–‍38	36‍–‍45
Chicago White Sox	77	85	.475	17	40‍–‍41	37‍–‍44
Texas Rangers	57	105	.352	37	35‍–‍46	22‍–‍59

=== Record vs. opponents ===
1973 American League record Sources:
Team	BAL	BOS	CAL	CWS	CLE	DET	KC	MIL	MIN	NYY	OAK	TEX
Baltimore	—	7–11	6–6	8–4	12–6	9–9	8–4	15–3	8–4	9–9	5–7	10–2
Boston	11–7	—	7–5	6–6	9–9	3–15	8–4	12–6	6–6	14–4	4–8	9–3
California	6–6	5–7	—	8–10	5–7	7–5	10–8	5–7	10–8	6–6	6–12	11–7
Chicago	4–8	6–6	10–8	—	7–5	5–7	6–12	3–9	9–9	8–4	6–12	13–5
Cleveland	6–12	9–9	7–5	5–7	—	9–9	2–10	9–9	7–5	7–11	3–9	7–5
Detroit	9–9	15–3	5–7	7–5	9–9	—	4–8	12–6	5–7	7–11	7–5	5–7
Kansas City	4–8	4–8	8–10	12–6	10–2	8–4	—	8–4	9–9	6–6	8–10	11–7
Milwaukee	3–15	6–12	7–5	9–3	9–9	6–12	4–8	—	8–4	10–8	4–8	8–4
Minnesota	4–8	6–6	8–10	9–9	5–7	7–5	9–9	4–8	—	3–9	14–4	12–6
New York	9–9	4–14	6–6	4–8	11–7	11–7	6–6	8–10	9–3	—	4–8	8–4
Oakland	7–5	8–4	12–6	12–6	9–3	5–7	10–8	8–4	4–14	8–4	—	11–7
Texas	2–10	3–9	7–11	5–13	5–7	7–5	7–11	4–8	6–12	4–8	7–11	—

=== Notable transactions ===
- April 3, 1973: Don Shaw was traded by the Athletics to the Detroit Tigers for Tim Hosley.
- May 4, 1973: Jerry McNertney was purchased from the Athletics by the Pittsburgh Pirates.
- May 11, 1973: Mark Budaska was signed as an amateur free agent by the Athletics.
- June 24, 1973: Steve McCatty was signed by the Athletics as an amateur free agent.
- July 7, 1973: Dal Maxvill was purchased from the Athletics by the Pittsburgh Pirates.
- July 31, 1973: Jesús Alou was purchased by the Athletics from the Houston Astros.
- August 29, 1973: Gonzalo Márquez was traded by the Athletics to the Chicago Cubs for Pat Bourque.
- September 11, 1973: Rico Carty was purchased by the Athletics from the Chicago Cubs.

==== Draft picks ====
- June 5, 1973: 1973 Major League Baseball draft
  - Floyd Bannister was drafted by the Athletics in the 3rd round, but did not sign.
  - Matt Keough was drafted by the Athletics in the 7th round.
  - Derek Bryant was drafted by the Athletics in the 8th round.
  - Craig Mitchell was drafted by the Athletics in the 1st round (1st pick) of the secondary phase.

=== Roster ===
1973 Oakland Athletics
Roster
Pitchers: 36 Glenn Abbott; 14 Vida Blue; 29 Chuck Dobson; 34 Rollie Fingers; 22 Rob Gardner; 33 Dave Hamilton; 30 Ken Holtzman; 27 Catfish Hunter; 32 Darold Knowles; 25 Paul Lindblad; 13 Blue Moon Odom; 7,28 Horacio Piña	Catchers: 10 Ray Fosse; 15 Larry Haney; 15 Tim Hosley; Infielders: 17 Mike Andrews; 6 Sal Bando; 38 Pat Bourque; 19 Bert Campaneris; 16 Billy Conigliaro; 3 Phil Garner; 1 Dick Green; 20 Mike Hegan; 11 Ted Kubiak; 7 Deron Johnson; 12 Gonzalo Márquez; 21 Dal Maxvill; 5 Rich McKinney; 18 Gene Tenace; 8 Manny Trillo	Outfielders: 22 Jesús Alou; 37 Vic Davalillo; 9 Reggie Jackson; 3 Jay Johnstone; 24 Allan Lewis; 2 Ángel Mangual; 4 Billy North; 26 Joe Rudi; Other batters: 12 Rico Carty; 35 José Morales	Manager: 23 Dick Williams; Coaches: 41 Jerry Adair; 44 Vern Hoscheit; 43 Irv Noren; 42 Wes Stock

== Player stats ==
= Indicates team leader

=== Batting ===
==== Starters by position ====
Note: Pos = Position; G = Games played; AB = At bats; R = Runs scored; H = Hits; Avg. = Batting average; HR = Home runs; RBI = Runs batted in; SB = Stolen bases

Pos	Player	G	AB	R	H	Avg.	HR	RBI	SB
C	Ray Fosse	143	492	37	126	.256	7	52	2
1B	Gene Tenace	160	510	83	132	.259	24	84	2
2B	Dick Green	133	332	33	87	.262	3	42	0
3B	Sal Bando	162	592	97	170	.287	29	98	4
SS	Bert Campaneris	151	601	89	150	.250	4	46	34
LF	Joe Rudi	120	437	53	118	.270	12	66	0
CF	Billy North	146	554	98	158	.285	5	34	53
RF	Reggie Jackson	151	539	99	158	.293	32	117	22
DH	Deron Johnson	131	464	61	114	.246	19	81	0

==== Other batters ====
Note: G = Games played; AB = At bats; R = Runs scored; H = Hits; Avg. = Batting average; HR = Home runs; RBI = Runs batted in; SB = Stolen bases

Player	G	AB	R	H	Avg.	HR	RBI	SB
Ángel Mangual	74	192	20	43	.224	3	13	1
Ted Kubiak	106	182	15	40	.220	3	17	1
Billy Conigliaro	48	110	5	22	.200	0	14	1
Jesús Alou	36	108	10	33	.306	1	11	0
Mike Hegan	75	71	8	13	.183	1	5	0
Rich McKinney	48	65	9	16	.246	1	7	0
Vic Davalillo	38	64	5	12	.188	0	4	0
Pat Bourque	23	42	8	8	.190	2	9	0
Jay Johnstone	23	28	1	3	.107	0	3	0
Gonzalo Márquez	23	25	1	6	.240	0	2	0
Mike Andrews	18	21	1	4	.190	0	0	0
Dal Maxvill	29	19	0	4	.211	0	1	0
Tim Hosley	13	14	3	3	.214	0	2	0
José Morales	6	14	0	4	.286	0	1	0
Manny Trillo	17	12	0	3	.250	0	3	0
Rico Carty	7	8	1	2	.250	1	1	0
Phil Garner	9	5	0	0	.000	0	0	0
Larry Haney	2	2	0	1	.500	0	0	0
Allan Lewis	35	0	16	0	----	0	0	7

=== Pitching ===
==== Starting pitchers ====
Note: G = Games pitched; IP = Innings pitched; W = Wins; L = Losses; ERA = Earned run average; BB = Bases on balls; SO = Strikeouts

Player	G	IP	W	L	ERA	BB	SO
Ken Holtzman	40	297.1	21	13	2.97	66	157
Vida Blue	37	263.2	20	9	3.28	105	158
Catfish Hunter	36	256.1	21	5	3.34	69	124
Blue Moon Odom	30	150.1	5	12	4.49	67	83
Dave Hamilton	16	69.2	6	4	4.39	24	34
Chuck Dobson	1	2.1	0	1	7.71	2	3

==== Other pitchers ====
Note: G = Games pitched; IP = Innings pitched; W = Wins; L = Losses; ERA = Earned run average; BB = Bases on balls; SO = Strikeouts

Player	G	IP	W	L	ERA	BB	SO
Glenn Abbott	5	18.2	1	0	3.86	7	6

==== Relief pitchers ====
Note: G = Games pitched; IP = Innings pitched; W = Wins; L = Losses; SV = Saves; ERA = Earned run average; BB = Bases on balls; SO = Strikeouts

Player	G	IP	W	L	SV	ERA	BB	SO
Rollie Fingers	62	126.2	7	8	22	1.92	39	110
Darold Knowles	52	99.0	6	8	9	3.09	49	46
Horacio Piña	47	88.0	6	3	8	2.76	34	41
Paul Lindblad	36	78.0	1	5	2	3.69	28	33
Rob Gardner	3	7.1	0	0	0	4.91	2	4

== Postseason ==
=== ALCS ===
==== Game 1 ====
October 6, 1973, at Memorial Stadium

In Game 1, the Orioles jumped on Oakland starter Vida Blue and reliever Horacio Piña for four runs in the bottom of the first inning. Jim Palmer pitched a 5-hit shutout as the Orioles won, 6–0.

Team	1	2	3	4	5	6	7	8	9	R	H	E
Oakland	0	0	0	0	0	0	0	0	0	0	5	1
Baltimore	4	0	0	0	0	0	1	1	X	6	12	0
W: Jim Palmer (1–0) L: Vida Blue (0–1)
HR: None

==== Game 2 ====
October 7, 1973, at Memorial Stadium

In Game 2, the Athletics hit three home runs off Baltimore starter Dave McNally, and won 6–3 behind Catfish Hunter.

Team	1	2	3	4	5	6	7	8	9	R	H	E
Oakland	1	0	0	0	0	2	0	2	1	6	9	0
Baltimore	1	0	0	0	0	1	0	1	0	3	8	0
W: Catfish Hunter (1–0) L: Dave McNally (0–1) S: Rollie Fingers (1)
HR: OAK – Bert Campaneris (1), Joe Rudi (1), Sal Bando 2 (2)

==== Game 3 ====
October 9, 1973, at Oakland-Alameda County Coliseum

In Game 3, the Athletics won 2–1 when shortstop Bert Campaneris homered to lead off the bottom of the 11th inning.

Team	1	2	3	4	5	6	7	8	9	10	11	R	H	E
Baltimore	0	1	0	0	0	0	0	0	0	0	0	1	3	0
Oakland	0	0	0	0	0	0	0	1	0	0	1	2	4	3
W: Ken Holtzman (1–0) L: Mike Cuellar (0–1)
HR: OAK – Bert Campaneris (2) BAL – Earl Williams (1)

==== Game 4 ====
October 10, 1973, at Oakland-Alameda County Coliseum

In Game 4, the Athletics held a 4–0 lead after six innings, but the Orioles scored four in the seventh off Blue to tie the game; the key blow was a three-run home run by catcher Andy Etchebarren. Baltimore second baseman Bobby Grich broke the tie with a solo home run in the 8th inning, and the Orioles went on to win, 5–4.

Team	1	2	3	4	5	6	7	8	9	R	H	E
Baltimore	0	0	0	0	0	0	4	1	0	5	8	0
Oakland	0	3	0	0	0	1	0	0	0	4	7	0
W: Grant Jackson (1–0) L: Rollie Fingers (0–1)
HR: BAL – Andy Etchebarren (1), Bobby Grich (1)

==== Game 5 ====
October 11, 1973, at Oakland-Alameda County Coliseum

In Game 5, Hunter pitched a 5-hit shutout as the Athletics won, 3–0, and took the series 3 games to 2.

Team	1	2	3	4	5	6	7	8	9	R	H	E
Baltimore	0	0	0	0	0	0	0	0	0	0	5	2
Oakland	0	0	1	2	0	0	0	0	X	3	7	0
W: Catfish Hunter (2–0) L: Doyle Alexander (0–1)
HR: None

=== World Series ===
The Athletics' victory over the New York Mets in the 1973 Series was marred by Charlie O. Finley's antics. Finley forced Mike Andrews to sign a false affidavit saying he was injured after the reserve second baseman committed two consecutive errors in the 12th inning of the A's Game Two loss to the Mets. This would allow Manny Trillo, ineligible because he was not a member of the team on Sep 1, to be activated.

By demeaning Mike Andrews, Finley brought on open rebellion, the logical progression for a team that has never deluded itself about being a happy ship. The A's worked out at Shea with Andrews' No. 17 taped to their uniforms as a sign of sympathy with him. By then he was back home in Peabody, Massachusetts. When other team members, manager Dick Williams, and virtually the entire viewing public rallied to Andrews' defense, commissioner Bowie Kuhn forced Finley to back down. Andrews entered Game 4 in the eighth inning as a pinch-hitter. As he walked to the on-deck circle the crowd of 54,817 at Shea Stadium spotted his No. 17 and commenced cheering. He promptly grounded out, and Finley ordered him benched for the remainder of the Series.

Andrews never played another major league game. Williams was so disgusted by the affair that he announced his resignation as manager while the series was still being played. Finley retaliated by vetoing Williams' attempt to become manager of the Yankees. Finley claimed that since Williams still owed Oakland the last year of his contract, he could not manage anywhere else. Finley relented later in 1974 and allowed Williams to take over as manager of the California Angels.

The A's won the World Series in seven games after rallying from a three games to two deficit.

==== Summary ====
AL Oakland Athletics (4) vs. NL New York Mets (3)

Game	Score	Date	Location	Attendance	Time of Game
1	Mets – 1, A's – 2	October 13	Oakland-Alameda County Coliseum	46,021	2:26
2	Mets – 10, A's – 7 (12 inns)	October 14	Oakland-Alameda County Coliseum	55,989	4:13
3	A's – 3, Mets – 2 (11 inns)	October 16	Shea Stadium	54,817	3:15
4	A's – 1, Mets – 6	October 17	Shea Stadium	54,817	2:41
5	A's – 0, Mets – 2	October 18	Shea Stadium	54,817	2:39
6	Mets – 1, A's – 3	October 20	Oakland-Alameda County Coliseum	49,333	2:07
7	Mets – 2, A's – 5	October 21	Oakland-Alameda County Coliseum	49,333	2:37

== Awards and honors ==
- Bert Campaneris, Babe Ruth Award
- Reggie Jackson, OF, American League RBI Champion
- Reggie Jackson, OF, World Series Most Valuable Player Award

== Farm system ==
Level	Team	League	Manager
AAA	Tucson Toros	Pacific Coast League	Sherm Lollar
AA	Birmingham A's	Southern League	Harry Bright
A	Burlington Bees	Midwest League	Rene Lachemann
A-Short Season	Lewiston Broncos	Northwest League	Mike Sgobba
