= Baseball strike =

A strike in baseball results when a batter swings at and misses a pitch, does not swing at a pitch in the strike zone, or hits a foul ball that is not caught by a fielder (unless he already has two strikes on him).

Baseball strike may also refer to:

- 1972 Major League Baseball strike
- 1973 Major League Baseball lockout
- 1976 Major League Baseball lockout
- 1980 Major League Baseball strike
- 1981 Major League Baseball strike
- 1985 Major League Baseball strike
- 1990 Major League Baseball lockout
- 1994–95 Major League Baseball strike
- 2004 Nippon Professional Baseball strike
