= 1973 Major League Baseball season =

1973 MLB season
- League: American League (AL); National League (NL)
- Sport: Baseball
- Duration: Regular season: April 6 – September 30, 1973 (AL); April 5 – October 1, 1973 (NL); Postseason: October 6–21, 1973
- Games: 162
- Teams: 24 (12 per league)
- TV partner: NBC

Draft
- Top draft pick: David Clyde
- Picked by: Texas Rangers

Regular season
- Season MVP: AL: Reggie Jackson (OAK); NL: Pete Rose (CIN)

Postseason
- AL champions: Oakland Athletics
- AL runners-up: Baltimore Orioles
- NL champions: New York Mets
- NL runners-up: Cincinnati Reds

World Series
- Champions: Oakland Athletics
- Runners-up: New York Mets
- World Series MVP: Reggie Jackson (OAK)

MLB seasons
- ← 1972 1974 →

Locations of teams for the 1973 American League season
West East
Locations of teams for the 1971–1976 National League seasons
West East

The 1973 major league baseball season began on April 5 while the regular season ended on October 1. The postseason began on October 6. The 70th World Series then began on began on October 13 and concluded on October 21 with the Oakland Athletics of the American League defeating the New York Mets of the National League in seven games to win their seventh title in franchise history, winning their second of three straight World Series titles, and their second since moving to Oakland in 1968.

The 44th All-Star Game was held on July 24 at Royals Stadium in Kansas City, Missouri, home of the Kansas City Royals. The National League won, 7–1, and was the second win in what would be an 11-game win streak that lasted until 1983.

This was the first season of the designated hitter rule in the American League.

American League umpires began wearing burgundy blazers with blue pants, a change from the navy blue coats and gray pants worn the previous five seasons (1968–1972). The burgundy blazers were worn through 1979.

A lockout in the offseason (February 8–25) did not result in any regular season games being canceled, but the start of spring training was delayed.

== Schedule ==
The 1973 schedule consisted of 162 games for all teams in the American League and National League, each of which had 12 teams. Each league was split into two six-team divisions. Each team was scheduled to play 18 games against their five division rivals, totaling 90 games, and 12 games against six interdivision opponents, totaling 72 games. This continued the format put in place since the 1969 and would be used until 1977 in the American League and 1993 in the National League.

National League Opening Day took place on April 5, featuring a game between the Cincinnati Reds and Houston Astros, while National League Opening Day took place the following day, featuring eight teams. In a scheduling oddity, April 30 saw all teams not play, the last time all teams would be off (aside from All-Star breaks and labor shortages) until June 29, 1998. The American League would see its final day of the regular season on September 30, featuring 10 teams, while the National League would see its final day of the regular season on October 1, featuring four teams. The National League Championship Series took place between October 6 and October 10, while the American League Championship Series took place between October 6 and October 11. The World Series took place between October 13 and October 21.

== Rule changes ==
The 1973 season saw the following rule changes:

- The American League instituted the designated hitter on an experimental basis. The position replaces the pitcher in the batting lineup. It would eventually be made permanent in 1976. It would not be until the 2020 season that the National League implemented the rule temporarily due to the COVID-19 pandemic, and permanently in 2022.
- Rules instituting maximum glove dimensions and uniform color on pitcher's gloves were standardized.
- Decisions regarding protested games shall be finalized by the League President.
- Guidelines for cumulative performance records were added:
  - Consecutive hitting streaks will continue if a base on balls, defensive interference, hit by pitch, or sacrifice bunt occurs, while a sacrifice fly will end the streak.
  - Consecutive-game hitting streaks will follow the same guidelines as individual hitting streaks mentioned above; if a player has a sacrifice fly and no hits, the streak ends.
  - Consecutive playing streaks end if a player misses an entire game or only appears as a pinch runner. The streak continues if a player has a full at bat or plays a half-inning of defense. If a player is ejected before reaching an of the aforementioned requirements, the streak continues.
  - All actions and performances taken place during the completion of a suspended game will count to the original starting date of the game.

== Teams ==
League	Division	Team	City	Ballpark	Capacity	Manager
American League	East	Baltimore Orioles	Baltimore, Maryland	Baltimore Memorial Stadium	53,208	Earl Weaver
American League	East	Boston Red Sox	Boston, Massachusetts	Fenway Park	33,368	Eddie Kasko
American League	East	Boston Red Sox	Boston, Massachusetts	Fenway Park	33,368	Eddie Popowski
American League	East	Cleveland Indians	Cleveland, Ohio	Cleveland Stadium	74,483	Ken Aspromonte
American League	East	Detroit Tigers	Detroit, Michigan	Tiger Stadium	52,806	Billy Martin
American League	East	Detroit Tigers	Detroit, Michigan	Tiger Stadium	52,806	Joe Schultz Jr.
American League	East	Milwaukee Brewers	Milwaukee, Wisconsin	Milwaukee County Stadium	53,192	Del Crandall
American League	East	New York Yankees	New York, New York	Yankee Stadium	65,010	Ralph Houk
American League	West	California Angels	Anaheim, California	Anaheim Stadium	43,500	Bobby Winkles
American League	West	Chicago White Sox	Chicago, Illinois	White Sox Park	44,492	Chuck Tanner
American League	West	Kansas City Royals	Kansas City, Missouri	Royals Stadium	40,613	Jack McKeon
American League	West	Minnesota Twins	Bloomington, Minnesota	Metropolitan Stadium	45,919	Frank Quilici
American League	West	Oakland Athletics	Oakland, California	Oakland–Alameda County Coliseum	50,000	Dick Williams
American League	West	Texas Rangers	Arlington, Texas	Arlington Stadium	35,649	Whitey Herzog
American League	West	Texas Rangers	Arlington, Texas	Arlington Stadium	35,649	Del Wilber
American League	West	Texas Rangers	Arlington, Texas	Arlington Stadium	35,649	Billy Martin
National League	East	Chicago Cubs	Chicago, Illinois	Wrigley Field	37,702	Whitey Lockman
National League	East	Montreal Expos	Montreal, Quebec	Jarry Park Stadium	29,125	Gene Mauch
National League	East	New York Mets	New York, New York	Shea Stadium	55,300	Yogi Berra
National League	East	Philadelphia Phillies	Philadelphia, Pennsylvania	Veterans Stadium	62,382	Danny Ozark
National League	East	Pittsburgh Pirates	Pittsburgh, Pennsylvania	Three Rivers Stadium	58,722	Bill Virdon
National League	East	Pittsburgh Pirates	Pittsburgh, Pennsylvania	Three Rivers Stadium	58,722	Danny Murtaugh
National League	East	St. Louis Cardinals	St. Louis, Missouri	Civic Center Busch Memorial Stadium	53,138	Red Schoendienst
National League	West	Atlanta Braves	Atlanta, Georgia	Atlanta Stadium	51,383	Eddie Mathews
National League	West	Cincinnati Reds	Cincinnati, Ohio	Riverfront Stadium	52,953	Sparky Anderson
National League	West	Houston Astros	Houston, Texas	Houston Astrodome	47,000	Leo Durocher
National League	West	Los Angeles Dodgers	Los Angeles, California	Dodger Stadium	56,000	Walter Alston
National League	West	San Diego Padres	San Diego, California	San Diego Stadium	50,000	Don Zimmer
National League	West	San Francisco Giants	San Francisco, California	Candlestick Park	58,945	Charlie Fox

== Standings ==
=== American League ===
AL East
Team	W	L	Pct.	GB	Home	Road
Baltimore Orioles	97	65	.599	—	50‍–‍31	47‍–‍34
Boston Red Sox	89	73	.549	8	48‍–‍33	41‍–‍40
Detroit Tigers	85	77	.525	12	47‍–‍34	38‍–‍43
New York Yankees	80	82	.494	17	50‍–‍31	30‍–‍51
Milwaukee Brewers	74	88	.457	23	40‍–‍41	34‍–‍47
Cleveland Indians	71	91	.438	26	34‍–‍47	37‍–‍44

AL West
Team	W	L	Pct.	GB	Home	Road
Oakland Athletics	94	68	.580	—	50‍–‍31	44‍–‍37
Kansas City Royals	88	74	.543	6	48‍–‍33	40‍–‍41
Minnesota Twins	81	81	.500	13	37‍–‍44	44‍–‍37
California Angels	79	83	.488	15	43‍–‍38	36‍–‍45
Chicago White Sox	77	85	.475	17	40‍–‍41	37‍–‍44
Texas Rangers	57	105	.352	37	35‍–‍46	22‍–‍59

=== National League ===
NL East
Team	W	L	Pct.	GB	Home	Road
New York Mets	82	79	.509	—	43‍–‍38	39‍–‍41
St. Louis Cardinals	81	81	.500	1½	43‍–‍38	38‍–‍43
Pittsburgh Pirates	80	82	.494	2½	41‍–‍40	39‍–‍42
Montreal Expos	79	83	.488	3½	43‍–‍38	36‍–‍45
Chicago Cubs	77	84	.478	5	41‍–‍39	36‍–‍45
Philadelphia Phillies	71	91	.438	11½	38‍–‍43	33‍–‍48

NL West
Team	W	L	Pct.	GB	Home	Road
Cincinnati Reds	99	63	.611	—	50‍–‍31	49‍–‍32
Los Angeles Dodgers	95	66	.590	3½	50‍–‍31	45‍–‍35
San Francisco Giants	88	74	.543	11	47‍–‍34	41‍–‍40
Houston Astros	82	80	.506	17	41‍–‍40	41‍–‍40
Atlanta Braves	76	85	.472	22½	40‍–‍40	36‍–‍45
San Diego Padres	60	102	.370	39	31‍–‍50	29‍–‍52

=== Tie game ===
1 tie game (0 in AL, 1 in NL), which is not factored into winning percentage or games behind (and was replayed again) occurred during the season.

==== National League ====
- May 19, Atlanta Braves vs. Los Angeles Dodgers, tied at 7 following one out in the top of the 13th inning due to rain.

== Postseason ==
The postseason began on October 6 and ended on October 21 with the Oakland Athletics defeating the New York Mets in the 1973 World Series in seven games.

=== Bracket ===
League Championship Series (ALCS, NLCS)
East	Baltimore	2
West	Oakland	3
East	NY Mets	3
West	Cincinnati	2

World Series
AL	Oakland	4
NL	NY Mets	3

== Managerial changes ==
=== Off-season ===
Team	Former Manager	New Manager
California Angels	Del Rice	Bobby Winkles
Kansas City Royals	Bob Lemon	Jack McKeon
Philadelphia Phillies	Paul Owens	Danny Ozark
Texas Rangers	Ted Williams	Whitey Herzog

=== In-season ===
Team	Former Manager	New Manager
Boston Red Sox	Eddie Kasko	Eddie Popowski
Detroit Tigers	Billy Martin	Joe Schultz Jr.
Pittsburgh Pirates	Bill Virdon	Danny Murtaugh
Texas Rangers	Whitey Herzog	Del Wilber
Texas Rangers	Del Wilber	Billy Martin

== League leaders ==
=== American League ===
Hitting leaders
Stat	Player	Total
AVG	Rod Carew (MIN)	.350
OPS	Reggie Jackson (OAK)	.914
HR	Reggie Jackson (OAK)	32
RBI	Reggie Jackson (OAK)	117
R	Reggie Jackson (OAK)	99
H	Rod Carew (MIN)	203
SB	Tommy Harper (BOS)	54

Pitching leaders
Stat	Player	Total
W	Wilbur Wood (CWS)	24
L	Stan Bahnsen (CWS)	21
ERA	Jim Palmer (BAL)	2.40
K	Nolan Ryan^{1} (CAL)	383
IP	Wilbur Wood (CWS)	359.1
SV	John Hiller (DET)	38
WHIP	Luis Tiant (BOS)	1.085

^{1} Modern (1901–present) single-season strikeout record

=== National League ===
Hitting leaders
Stat	Player	Total
AVG	Pete Rose (CIN)	.338
OPS	Willie Stargell (PIT)	1.038
HR	Willie Stargell (PIT)	44
RBI	Willie Stargell (PIT)	119
R	Bobby Bonds (SF)	131
H	Pete Rose (CIN)	230
SB	Lou Brock (STL)	70

Pitching leaders
Stat	Player	Total
W	Ron Bryant (SF)	24
L	Steve Carlton (PHI)	20
ERA	Tom Seaver (NYM)	2.08
K	Tom Seaver (NYM)	251
IP	Jack Billingham (CIN); Steve Carlton (PHI)	293.1
SV	Mike Marshall (MON)	31
WHIP	Tom Seaver (NYM)	0.976

== Milestones ==
=== Batters ===
==== Cycles ====
- Joe Torre (STL):
  - Torre hit for his first cycle and 14th in franchise history, on June 27 against the Pittsburgh Pirates.

==== Other batting accomplishments ====
- Willie Davis (LAD):
  - Hit his 2,000th career hit with a home run in the sixth inning against the Atlanta Braves on June 19.
- Pete Rose (CIN):
  - Hit his 2,000th career hit with a single in the sixth inning against the San Francisco Giants on June 19.
- Bobby Bonds (SF):
  - Breaks the National League record for most leadoff home runs previously set by Lou Brock, by hitting his 22nd leadoff home run against the Cincinnati Reds on June 20.
- Luis Aparicio (BOS):
  - Recorded his 500th career stolen base in the sixth inning against the Milwaukee Brewers in game one of a doubleheader on July 1. He became the 22nd player to reach this mark.
- Willie McCovey (SF):
  - Became the 15th player in Major League history to hit 400 home runs in the third inning against the Pittsburgh Pirates on July 15.
- Hank Aaron (ATL):
  - Became the second player in Major League history to hit 700 home runs in the third inning against the Philadelphia Phillies on July 21.
- Lou Brock (STL):
  - Recorded his 600th career stolen base in the first inning against the Chicago Cubs on July 30. He became the ninth player to reach this mark.
- Willie Mays (NYM):
  - Became the third player in major league history to play in 3,000 games on August 26 against the San Francisco Giants.

=== Pitchers ===
==== No-hitters ====
- Steve Busby (KC):
  - Busby threw his first career no-hitter and the first no-hitter in franchise history, by defeating the Detroit Tigers 3–0 on April 27. He walked six and struck out four.
- Nolan Ryan (CAL):
  - Ryan threw his first career no-hitter and the third no-hitter in franchise history, by defeating the Kansas City Royals 3–0 on May 15. He walked three and struck out 12.
  - Ryan threw his second career no-hitter and the fourth no-hitter in franchise history, by defeating the Detroit Tigers 6–0 on July 15. He walked four and struck out 17.
- Jim Bibby (TEX/STL):
  - Bibby threw his first career no-hitter and first no-hitter in franchise history as a part of the Texas Rangers, by defeating the Oakland Athletics 6–0 on July 30. He walked six and struck out 13.
- Phil Niekro (ATL):
  - Niekro threw his first career no-hitter and 12th no-hitter in franchise history, by defeating the San Diego Padres 9–0 on August 5. He walked three and struck out four.

==== Other pitching accomplishments ====
- Bob Gibson (STL):
  - Breaks the record for most consecutive starts previously set by Red Ruffing, by making his 242nd start against the San Francisco Giants.
- Nolan Ryan (CAL):
  - Simultaneously broke Sandy Koufax's 1965 strikeout record and set the Major League record when he struck out his 383rd batter of the season, Rich Reese of the Minnesota Twins, on September 27 in the 11th inning,

=== Miscellaneous ===
- Chicago White Sox:
  - Set a major league record for most runs scored in the 21st inning, by scoring four runs against the Cleveland Indians in a game that began on May 26 and ended in game one of a doubleheader on May 28.
- Montreal Expos / Cincinnati Reds:
  - Set a National League record for most combined walks in a single game at 25, previously set in 1910 and 1911 at 23, with the Montreal Expos walking 10 and Cincinnati Reds walking 15, on July 9 in a game that Cincinnati won 11–6.

== Awards and honors ==
=== Regular season ===
Baseball Writers' Association of America Awards
BBWAA Award	National League	American League
Rookie of the Year	Gary Matthews (SF)	Al Bumbry (BAL)
Cy Young Award	Tom Seaver (NYM)	Jim Palmer (BAL)
Most Valuable Player	Pete Rose (CIN)	Reggie Jackson (OAK)
Babe Ruth Award (World Series MVP)	—	Bert Campaneris (OAK)
Gold Glove Awards
Position	National League	American League
Pitcher	Bob Gibson (STL)	Jim Kaat (CWS/MIN)
Catcher	Johnny Bench (CIN)	Thurman Munson (NYY)
1st Base	Mike Jorgensen (MON)	George Scott (MIL)
2nd Base	Joe Morgan (CIN)	Bobby Grich (BAL)
3rd Base	Doug Rader (HOU)	Brooks Robinson (BAL)
Shortstop	Roger Metzger (HOU)	Mark Belanger (BAL)
Outfield	Bobby Bonds (SF)	Paul Blair (BAL)
Outfield	César Cedeño (HOU)	Amos Otis (KC)
Outfield	Willie Davis (LAD)	Mickey Stanley (DET)

=== Other awards ===
- Outstanding Designated Hitter Award: Orlando Cepeda (BOS)
- Roberto Clemente Award (Humanitarian): Al Kaline (DET)
- Hutch Award: John Hiller (DET)
- Sport Magazine's World Series Most Valuable Player Award: Reggie Jackson (OAK)

The Sporting News Awards
Award	National League	American League
Player of the Year	—	Reggie Jackson (OAK)
Pitcher of the Year	Ron Bryant (SF)	Jim Palmer (BAL)
Fireman of the Year (Relief pitcher)	Mike Marshall (MON)	John Hiller (DET)
Rookie Player of the Year	Gary Matthews (SF)	Al Bumbry (BAL)
Rookie Pitcher of the Year	Steve Rogers (MON)	Steve Busby (KC)
Comeback Player of the Year	Davey Johnson (ATL)	John Hiller (DET)
Manager of the Year	Gene Mauch (MON)	—
Executive of the Year	Bob Howsam (CIN)	—

=== Monthly awards ===
==== Player of the Month ====
Month	National League
April	Jerry Koosman (NYM)
May	Willie Crawford (LAD)
June	Greg Luzinski (PHI)
July	Pete Rose (CIN)
August	Davey Johnson (ATL)

=== Baseball Hall of Fame ===
- Roberto Clemente
- Monte Irvin
- George Kelly
- Warren Spahn
- Mickey Welch
- Billy Evans (umpire)

== Home field attendance ==
Team name	Wins	%±	Home attendance	%±	Per game
Los Angeles Dodgers	95	11.8%	2,136,192	14.8%	26,373
Cincinnati Reds	99	4.2%	2,017,601	25.2%	24,909
New York Mets	82	−1.2%	1,912,390	−10.4%	23,610
Detroit Tigers	85	−1.2%	1,724,146	−8.9%	21,286
St. Louis Cardinals	81	8.0%	1,574,046	31.5%	19,433
Boston Red Sox	89	4.7%	1,481,002	2.7%	18,284
Philadelphia Phillies	71	20.3%	1,475,934	9.9%	18,221
Houston Astros	82	−2.4%	1,394,004	−5.1%	17,210
Chicago Cubs	77	−9.4%	1,351,705	4.0%	16,896
Kansas City Royals	88	15.8%	1,345,341	90.1%	16,609
Pittsburgh Pirates	80	−16.7%	1,319,913	−7.5%	16,295
Chicago White Sox	77	−11.5%	1,302,527	10.6%	16,081
New York Yankees	80	1.3%	1,262,103	30.6%	15,582
Montreal Expos	79	12.9%	1,246,863	9.2%	15,393
Milwaukee Brewers	74	13.8%	1,092,158	81.9%	13,483
California Angels	79	5.3%	1,058,206	42.2%	13,064
Oakland Athletics	94	1.1%	1,000,763	8.6%	12,355
Baltimore Orioles	97	21.3%	958,667	6.5%	11,835
Minnesota Twins	81	5.2%	907,499	13.7%	11,204
San Francisco Giants	88	27.5%	834,193	28.8%	10,299
Atlanta Braves	76	8.6%	800,655	6.3%	9,885
Texas Rangers	57	5.6%	686,085	3.5%	8,470
Cleveland Indians	71	−1.4%	615,107	−1.8%	7,594
San Diego Padres	60	3.4%	611,826	−5.0%	7,553

== Venues ==
The Kansas City Royals leave Municipal Stadium from which they played four seasons and opened Royals Stadium, where they continue to play to the present day.

The New York Yankees would play their final game at Yankee Stadium on September 30, in what would be a two year hiatus caused by renovations. The team would play at Shea Stadium, the home of their cross-town rival New York Mets, before returning to a newly renovated Yankee Stadium in 1976.

== Media ==
=== Television ===
NBC was the exclusive national TV broadcaster of MLB, airing the weekend Game of the Week, Monday Night Baseball, the All-Star Game, both League Championship Series, and the World Series.

== Retired numbers ==
- Roberto Clemente had his No. 21 retired by the Pittsburgh Pirates on April 6. This was the fourth number retired by the team. The retirement of his number followed his untimely death following a plane crash at the end of 1972.
- Gil Hodges had his No. 14 retired by the New York Mets on June 9. This was the second number retired by the team.

== See also ==
- 1973 in baseball (Events, Movies, Births, Deaths)
- 1973 Nippon Professional Baseball season
