= Pat Bourque =

American baseball player (born 1947)

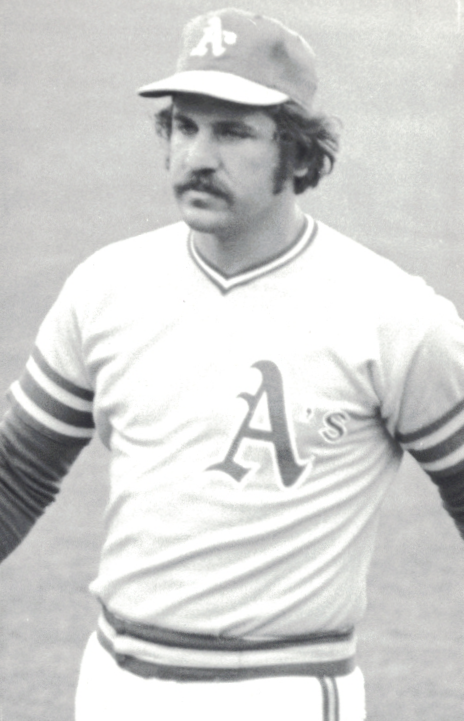
- First baseman
- Born: March 23, 1947 (age 79); Worcester, Massachusetts, U.S.
- Batted: Left Threw: Left

MLB debut
- September 6, 1971, for the Chicago Cubs

Last MLB appearance
- September 28, 1974, for the Minnesota Twins

MLB statistics
- Batting average: .215
- Home runs: 12
- Runs batted in: 61
- Stats at Baseball Reference

Teams
- Chicago Cubs (1971–1973); Oakland Athletics (1973–1974); Minnesota Twins (1974)

Career highlights and awards
- World Series champion (1973)

Patrick Daniel Bourque (born March 23, 1947) is an American former professional baseball player, a first baseman in Major League Baseball who played for three teams in a four-year MLB career. A left-handed batter and thrower, he stood 6 feet (1.8 m) tall and weighed 210 pounds (95 kg). Bourque hit a home run in his first at-bat against the Expos in Montreal while playing for the Cubs.

== Career ==
Bourque graduated from St. John's High School of Shrewsbury in 1965 and attended Holy Cross. In 1968 he played collegiate summer baseball with the Falmouth Commodores of the Cape Cod Baseball League and was named a league all-star. He was selected by the Chicago Cubs in the 33rd round of the 1969 MLB draft.

Bourque made his professional debut in 1971 with the Cubs, and went on to play parts of three seasons with the franchise. He had a successful minor league tenure, winning the American Association MVP in 1972 while playing with the Evansville Triplets. Midway through the 1973 season, Chicago traded Bourque to the Oakland Athletics for fellow first baseman Gonzalo Marquez. He spent a season with Oakland before being traded to the Minnesota Twins in another summer deal. Oakland received Jim Holt in return. Oakland reacquired Bourque following the 1974 season, trading Dan Ford and a minor leaguer to the Twins. Ford went on to play for eleven seasons in the majors, while Bourque didn't play another major league game.
