= Horacio Piña =

Mexican baseball player (born 1945)

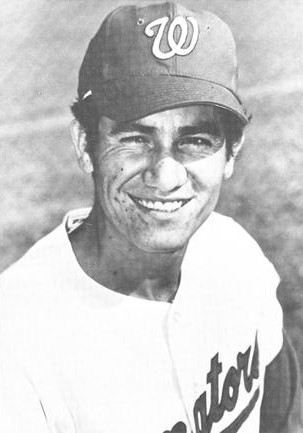
- Pitcher
- Born: March 12, 1945 (age 81); Matamoros, Coahuila, Mexico
- Batted: Right Threw: Right

MLB debut
- August 14, 1968, for the Cleveland Indians

Last MLB appearance
- October 1, 1978, for the Philadelphia Phillies

MLB statistics
- Win–loss record: 23–23
- Earned run average: 3.25
- Strikeouts: 278
- Stats at Baseball Reference

Teams
- Cleveland Indians (1968–1969); Washington Senators/Texas Rangers (1970–1972); Oakland Athletics (1973); Chicago Cubs (1974); California Angels (1974); Philadelphia Phillies (1978)

Career highlights and awards
- World Series champion (1973)

Member of the Mexican Professional

Baseball Hall of Fame
- Induction: 1988

Horacio Piña García [pee'-nyah] (born March 12, 1945) is a Mexican former relief pitcher who played in Major League Baseball over eight seasons between 1968 and 1978. Piña also played professionally in Mexico for all or portions of nine years. He batted and threw right-handed, and was listed as 6 feet 2 inches (1.88 m) tall and 177 pounds (80 kg).

Piña reached the major leagues in 1968 with the Cleveland Indians, spending two years with them before moving to the Washington Senators/Texas Rangers (1970–1972), Oakland Athletics (1973), Chicago Cubs (1974), California Angels (1974) and Philadelphia Phillies (1978). His most productive season came in 1972 with the last-place Rangers, when he posted career-numbers in saves (15), strikeouts (60) and games pitched (60). Traded to the Oakland Athletics for Mike Epstein on December 1, 1972, he responded with a 6–3 mark, eight saves and career-highs in ERA (2.76) and innings (88.0), helping them to clinch the ALCS and the World Series Championship. He was dealt from the Athletics to the Cubs for Bob Locker at the Winter Meetings on December 3, 1973. In an eight-season career, Piña posted a 23–23 record with a 3.25 ERA and 38 saves in 314 games. In three post-season games he had a perfect 0.00 ERA in five innings.

As a pitcher in the Mexican League, Piña threw a no-hitter in 1975 and a perfect game in 1978 while posting a 21–4 record with a 1.94 ERA that year. Piña gained induction in the Mexican Professional Baseball Hall of Fame in 1988.

== See also ==
- Players from Mexico in MLB
