= Paul Blair (baseball) =

American baseball player and coach (1944–2013)

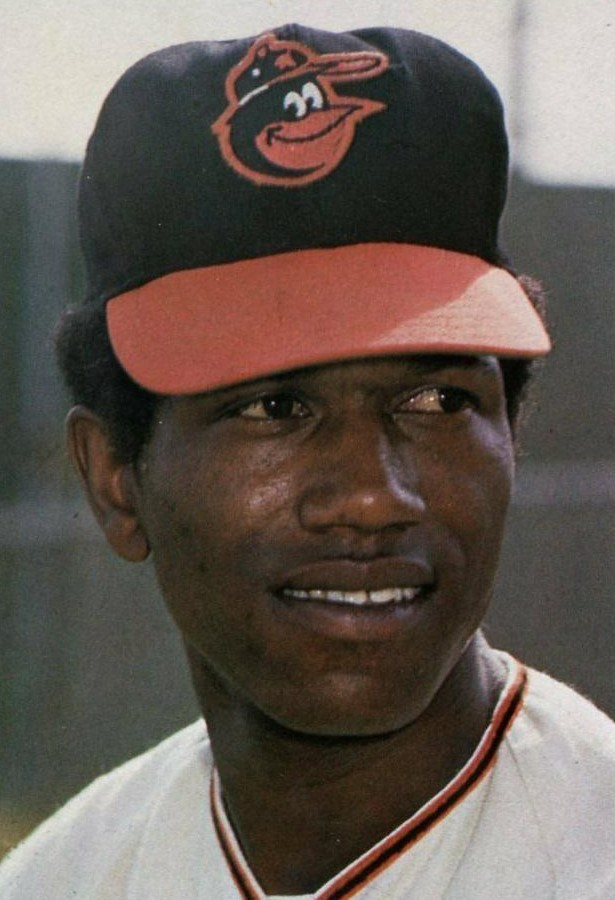
- Center fielder
- Born: February 1, 1944; Cushing, Oklahoma, U.S.
- Died: December 26, 2013 (aged 69); Baltimore, Maryland, U.S.
- Batted: Right Threw: Right

MLB debut
- September 9, 1964, for the Baltimore Orioles

Last MLB appearance
- June 20, 1980, for the New York Yankees

MLB statistics
- Batting average: .250
- Home runs: 134
- Runs batted in: 620
- Stats at Baseball Reference

Teams
- Baltimore Orioles (1964–1976); New York Yankees (1977–1979); Cincinnati Reds (1979); New York Yankees (1980)

Career highlights and awards
- 2× All-Star (1969, 1973); 4× World Series champion (1966, 1970, 1977, 1978); 8× Gold Glove Award (1967, 1969–1975); Baltimore Orioles Hall of Fame

Paul L. D. Blair (February 1, 1944 – December 26, 2013) was an American professional baseball player and coach. He played in Major League Baseball as an outfielder from 1964 through 1980, most notably as the center fielder for the Baltimore Orioles dynasty that won four American League pennants and two World Series championships between 1966 and 1970. He also played for the New York Yankees and the Cincinnati Reds.

A two-time All-Star player, Blair excelled as a defensive player, winning the Gold Glove Award eight times, including seven consecutive years from 1969 to 1975. One of the best defensive outfielders of his era, and "perhaps the finest" he had excellent range and was brilliant at tracking fly balls. He challenged hitters by playing shallow, then running down balls hit over his head. In 1984, Blair was inducted into the Baltimore Orioles Hall of Fame.

== Early life ==
Blair was born on February 1, 1944, in Cushing, Oklahoma but grew up in Los Angeles where he attended Manual Arts High School. An accomplished athlete, he played basketball, baseball and ran track and was a high jumper while a student. In 1961, he was selected Helms All-Southern California League as a second baseman.

== Minor league career ==
Blair was originally signed by the New York Mets as an amateur free agent in 1961 as a shortstop, but moved himself to the outfield. After spending the 1962 season in their farm system, he was selected by the Orioles in the 1962 first-year draft on November 26, 1962. He played in Baltimore's minor league system in 1963 and 1964, and came up to the Orioles for the first time on September 9, 1964, at only 20 years old.

In 1962, he played for the Mets Class C affiliate, the Santa Barbara Rancheros. He had a .228 batting average, with 17 home runs, 63 runs batted in (RBI), and 69 runs scored in 417 at bats. In 114 games in the outfield, he had a .963 fielding percentage, with 20 assists and seven double plays. In 1963, he played for the Single-A Stockton Ports in the Orioles' farm system, batting .324, with 126 runs scored, 60 stolen bases, 16 home runs, 77 RBI and a .906 OPS (on-base plus slugging). He was fourth in the California League in batting average among players with more than 450 at bats, tied for second in runs scored and was second in stolen bases.

Blair began the 1964 season with the Triple-A Rochester Red Wings, but played the majority of the season with the Double-A Elmira Pioneers. After hitting only .130 in Rochester, Blair had a .311 batting average in Elmira, leading the Eastern League in hitting. He also led the Eastern League with 34 stolen bases. He had a .981 fielding percentage in the outfield with 10 assists and only five errors. The Orioles called Blair up in September, and he played in his first Major League Game on September 9, 1964, appearing as a pinch runner. He appeared in eight games for the Orioles that September, with only one plate appearance.

== Major league career ==
=== Baltimore Orioles ===
He broke into the Orioles' lineup in 1965 and started in center field on opening day. Despite hitting only .234 in 364 at bats, with five home runs and 25 runs batted in, Blair impressed many with his defensive skills. He had the highest fielding percentage among all Major League center fielders and the second best fielding percentage among all outfielders (.992), behind only Rocky Colavito who had a perfect 1.000 in right field. The 21-year old Blair started 79 games in center field, with Jackie Brandt starting 32 and Russ Snyder starting 33.

The Orioles traded Brandt in December 1965, as a precursor to the Orioles acquiring future Hall of Fame right fielder Frank Robinson for the 1966 season. In 1966, the right-handed hitting Blair platooned in center field with the left-handed hitting Snyder. Blair batted .277, with six home runs, 33 RBIs, and 35 runs in 303 at bats. The Orioles team, led by 1966 AL Most Valuable Player and Triple Crown winner Frank Robinson, won the American League pennant by nine games, and then won the 1966 World Series in a four game sweep over the Los Angeles Dodgers. In Games 3 and 4 of that series, Blair played a major role in 1–0 shutouts by Wally Bunker and Dave McNally respectively. He hit a 430-foot home run off Claude Osteen in Game 3, and robbed Jim Lefebvre of an eighth-inning home run that would have tied Game 4. Blair also caught Lou Johnson's fly ball for the final out of the Series.

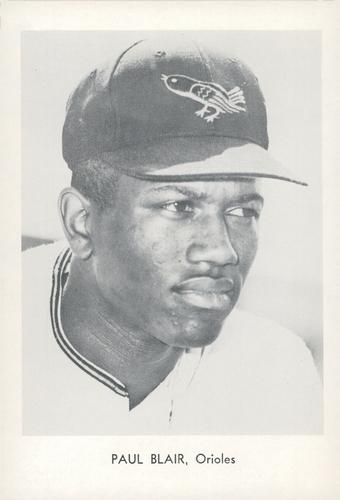
Blair in 1966

In 1967, Blair became the Orioles fulltime center fielder. He started 139 games in center field, and had a .985 fielding percentage. He led all Major League center fielders with 373 putouts and 13 assists. He also won the first of his eight Gold Glove Awards. As a hitter, Blair established a career high .293 batting average with 11 home runs and 64 RBIs, along with an American League-leading 12 triples. He was 16th in 1967 AL Most Valuable Player voting.

Blair slumped to .211 in 1968, and started in only 100 games; but still had a .993 fielding percentage in center field. Blair had perhaps his best season in 1969. Batting second behind Don Buford in the Orioles' lineup, he hit .285 with career highs in home runs (26), runs batted in (76) and runs (102). His 26 homers along with 20 stolen bases made him the first Orioles player to achieve at least 20 in each category in the same season. He also made the All-Star team for the first time; he would repeat this feat in 1973. In 1969, he had a .988 fielding percentage and led all Major League outfielders with 407 putouts. His five double plays tied for the Major League lead among center fielders with Clarence "Cito" Gaston. He was 11th in 1969 AL Most Valuable Player voting.

The 1969 Orioles won the pennant, with Blair becoming the first player to have 5 hits in a post-season game. He had five hits in six at-bats against the Minnesota Twins on October 6. The Orioles lost to the Miracle Mets in the World Series. Blair went 2-for-20 in that Series, including being the victim of one of Tommie Agee's two spectacular catches in Game 3 (Agee had also robbed Elrod Hendricks earlier in the game). On that Agee catch, Blair was the first batter Nolan Ryan faced in a World Series—the only World Series game the Hall of Fame pitcher would participate in. One of Blair's two hits came in the seventh inning of Game 2; it broke up Jerry Koosman's bid for a no-hitter.

Blair was beaned by Ken Tatum in the eighth inning of a 6–1 loss to the California Angels at Anaheim Stadium on May 31, 1970. He sustained a broken nose, orbital floor fractures below his left eye and a broken cheekbone. The beaning was unintentional. Tatum had grazed Boog Powell on the wrist immediately before hitting Blair, evidencing control problems that day. Tatum wrote a letter a few days later to the Orioles player representative Brooks Robinson apologizing for hitting Powell and Blair, telling the Orioles it was not intentional, and expressing how upset he was over hitting Blair and his deep concern for Blair. Blair returned to the starting lineup three weeks later, finishing the season batting .267.

On the season in 1970, Blair led the Orioles in stolen bases (24), tied for third on the team in home runs (18), and was fifth in runs (79) and RBIs (65). The Orioles went on to win the World Series that year. After going 1-for-13 in the 1970 American League Championship Series against the Minnesota Twins, he had the 1970 World Series' highest batting average and on-base percentage with .474 and .524 respectively, against the Cincinnati Reds. He also had a 1.050 OPS, five runs and three RBIs. He shared with Series MVP Brooks Robinson the five-game World Series record with nine hits apiece.

In 1971, Blair took up switch-hitting but stopped after batting only .193 (11-for-57); after having trouble hitting curveballs and changeups. He finished the season hitting .262, with 10 home runs, 44 RBIs and 75 runs. His Orioles won another pennant, but lost the World Series to the Pittsburgh Pirates in seven games. Blair started two of the three games (Games 1 and 3) in the Orioles three-game sweep of the Oakland Athletics in the 1971 American League Championship series. He was 3-for-9 in that series, and drove in the game-winning runs with a double in the seventh inning of Game 1 against Vida Blue.

During the 1971 World Series, Blair earned a place in baseball history in Game 4 by being the first man to bat in a World Series night game. Leading off the top of the first inning, Blair singled off Pittsburgh's Luke Walker. Oriole manager Earl Weaver started Merv Rettenmund in center field in Games 1-3 and 6-7, and Blair in Games 4 and 5. Blair appeared in four games total, going 3-for-9; while Rettenmund appeared in all seven games, hitting only .185. He led American League center fielders with a .991 fielding percentage.

The Orioles traded Frank Robinson before the 1972 season started. Robinson typically hit behind Blair in the Orioles batting order during their championship years. In 1972, Blair's average fell to .233, with 8 home runs, 49 RBIs and 47 runs. The Orioles missed the playoffs for the first time since 1968. Blair and the team rebounded in 1973. The Orioles came within one game of winning the 1973 American League Championship Series against the Oakland Athletics. On the season, Blair hit .280, with ten home runs, 64 RBIs, 73 runs and 18 stolen bases. He was selected to the AL All-Star team for the second time.

In 1974, Blair hit .261, with 17 home runs, 62 RBIs, 77 runs and 27 stolen bases. The Orioles again reached the American League Championship Series, losing to the A's in four games. Blair hit a team leading .286, with a home run, two RBIs and three runs. His home run came in the first inning of Game 1 off of future Hall of Fame pitcher Catfish Hunter, the only Orioles victory in the series. In 1975, Blair hit only .218, with five home runs, 31 RBIs and 51 runs, as the Orioles finished second to the Boston Red Sox in the East Division.

After starting over 100 games in center field from 1967 to 1975, Blair started only 89 games for the Orioles in 1976, and was used in a reserve role more frequently as a defensive replacement. He hit only .197 in 375 at bats, with three home runs and 16 RBIs. He said it was the toughest season he had as an Oriole.

=== New York Yankees ===
Blair was traded by the Orioles to the New York Yankees for Elliott Maddox and Rick Bladt on January 20, 1977. The transaction was driven by general manager Gabe Paul's desire to exile Maddox from the Yankees. Blair was primarily a defensive outfielder replacement in the late innings.

On June 18 of that year in a nationally televised game against the Boston Red Sox at Fenway Park, he was tangentially involved in one of the most bizarre scenes in baseball history. Yankee manager Billy Martin took right fielder Reggie Jackson out of the game and replaced him with Blair after Jackson had misplayed Jim Rice's fly ball for a double and/or failed to hustle defensively on the play. As the cameras watched, Jackson and Martin nearly came to blows. Yankees coaches Yogi Berra and Elston Howard prevented a physical confrontation.

In 1977, Blair started 38 games in the outfield for the Yankees (including five as a right fielder). He hit .262 in 164 at bats, with four home runs and 25 RBIs. In 1978, he started 20 games in the outfield for the Yankees, and hit .176. The Yankees won the World Series in both 1977 and 1978 over the Los Angeles Dodgers. Blair appeared in four games in the 1977 World Series, with four at bats and one hit. Blair's walk-off RBI single to left off Rick Rhoden won Game 1 of the 1977 World Series for the Yankees. In 1978, he appeared in six games, going 3-for-8 with two runs scored. With the Yankees down two games to one in 1978, Blair started Game 4 in center field, batting leadoff. He went 2-for-4.

=== Cincinnati Reds and second Yankees stint ===
Blair was released early in the 1979 season after appearing in only two games for the Yankees. The Cincinnati Reds signed him as a free agent less than a month later. He started 37 games as the Reds' center fielder, batting .150 in 140 at bats. Blair became a free agent in November 1979 and returned to the Yankees in May of 1980. He appeared in only 12 games for the Yankees, and was released on July 1.

== Legacy ==
In 1984, Blair was inducted into the Orioles Hall of Fame. In his 17-year career, Blair, whose nickname, "Motormouth", came from his talkative nature, batted .250 with 134 home runs and 620 RBI, 1513 hits and 171 stolen bases in 1947 games played. He had a .288 batting average, .347 on base percentage, and .379 slugging percentage over 28 World Series games. Three times he had more than 17 home runs and 20 stolen bases in a season.

He was also one of the top bunters in the game, recording at least 10 sacrifice hits four times in his career (1969, 1974-1976), including 17 during the 1975 season. In the very first playoff game in American League history, between the Orioles and Minnesota Twins on October 4, 1969, Blair's 11th inning bunt single off Ron Perranoski won the game for the Orioles. Twins manager Billy Martin said after the game, "'There’s no way to beat a perfect bunt.'"

Blair led the American League in putouts twice, and threw out 104 runners from center field over his career. His career "range factor" is superior to that of Hall of Fame center fielders Willie Mays and Ken Griffey, Jr. Blair's speed and quick reactions going back in the outfield enabled him to play shallow, and make catches à la Willie Mays. In each of the Orioles' three straight World Series seasons (1969-71), Blair won a Gold Glove, in addition to his 1967 Gold Glove. He also won a Gold Glove over each of the next four seasons, his last Gold Glove in 1975 coinciding with teammate Brooks Robinson winning his 16th consecutive — and last — Gold Glove at third base.

The 1969-73 Orioles have been ranked as the greatest fielding team in MLB history. The 1973 Orioles have the highest defensive wins above replacement (dWAR) in MLB history for a team, with four players in the top 100 lifetime (Mark Belanger/2, Brooks Robinson/3, Blair/63, Bobby Grich/86); followed by the 1969 Orioles. Among center fielders, Blair has the third highest career dWAR (18.8), just above Willie Mays (18.2).

Pro Baseball Hall of Fame Orioles’ pitcher Jim Palmer loved having Blair in the outfield because of his fielding ability. In his 1996 book Palmer and Weaver: Together We Were Eleven Foot Nine, he reminisced about the time the Orioles Hall of Fame manager Earl Weaver gave him three batting lineups to choose from for a game. "I'm looking basically for one thing," Palmer wrote. "Center field. We've got Paul Blair, who I personally think can field anything". According to Palmer, Blair caught 12 fly balls that night. Palmer also thought Blair "was worth two runs, defensively, every game". Weaver said that Blair never had to make great catches because he was always standing under the ball when it came down.

Palmer said at one point of Blair that "ever since he got hit by a pitch, he isn't the hitter he was." Blair himself rejected the notion that he was no longer the same quality player after being struck in the face. He pointed out late in his career that he had hit .280 in 1973, and was an All-Star; and that in 1975, he shared the Orioles Most Valuable Player Award with Mike Cuellar. Also, less than five months after his beaning, he hit over .400 in the World Series. Blair believed his home run and RBI numbers declined after 1970, not because of the beaning, but because the Orioles traded Frank Robinson who batted behind Blair in the lineup. Blair thought he did not get as many good pitches to hit after Robinson's departure before the 1972 season.

A fictional version of Blair makes a brief appearance in Laura Lippman’s 2019 novel Lady in the Lake, which is set in 1966. Author Stephen King describes Blair’s character in the book as uniquely optimistic. He hits a foul ball that lands near two of the main characters, and after the game has a short conversation with one of those characters.

== Coaching career ==
At the end of his playing career, Blair was hired as an outfield instructor for the Yankees in 1980. He did not like the travel and headed a baseball camp for high school players the following summer in Westchester, New York. In August 1982, he was named the head coach at Fordham University. Blair coached only one season at Fordham (1983) with the team finishing with a 14–19 record. In December 1983, the Houston Astros hired Blair as a base running and outfield instructor. After that, he was a third base coach for the Orioles Triple A team in Rochester until 1985.

In 1989, he played for the Gold Coast Suns in the newly formed Senior Professional Baseball Association, though the league folded after the season. Blair got his next shot at coaching in 1995 when he was named the manager of the Yonkers Hoot Owls in the newly formed Northeast League, an independent league of professional baseball. The team lasted just one season and finished a dismal 12–52.

Blair got his next, and last, shot at coaching in 1998, when he was named as the head coach for the Coppin State College baseball team. Blair coached the team from 1998–2002. Unfortunately, his overall record at Coppin State was a disappointing 30–185.

In the mid-1990s, Blair was named the assistant general manager of the yet-to-be named New Orleans franchise in the United Baseball League (UBL) (which was a planned third major league). When the league’s inaugural season was delayed, he became the assistant general manager for one of the planned New England teams.

While residing in Woodstock, Maryland, over the years Blair would work as a spring training instructor for the Orioles.

== Personal life and death ==
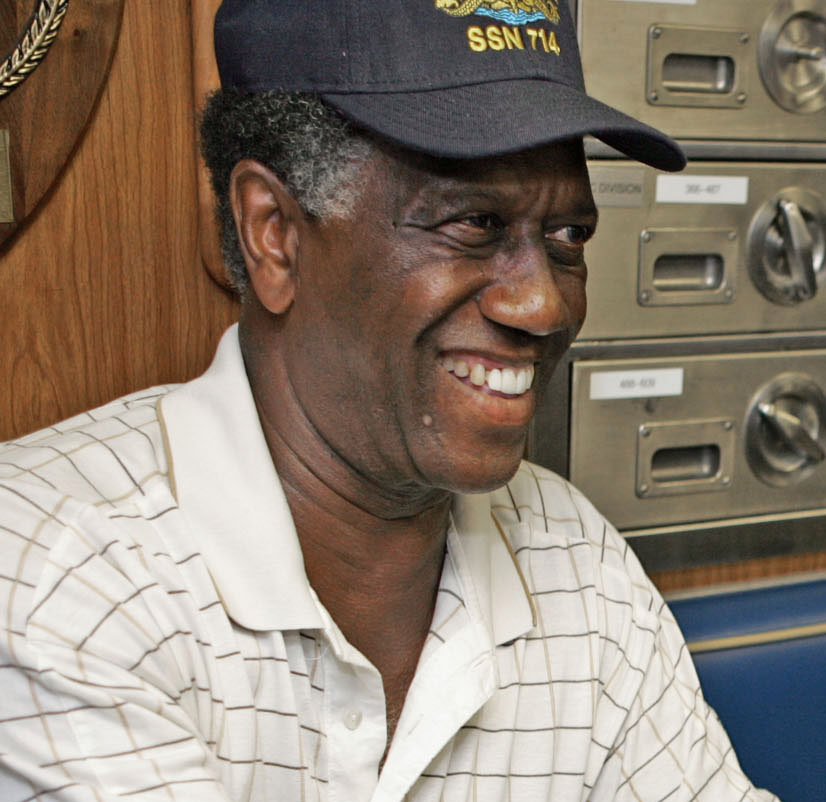
Blair in 2007

After his retirement from coaching, Blair lived in Woodstock, Maryland with his wife, Gloria. In his retirement, Blair often appeared in celebrity golf and bowling tournaments. At the time of his death, he was known for working out at Triangle Fitness in Eldersburg, Maryland and bowling at Kings Point Lanes in Reisterstown, Maryland. His son Paul Blair III played eight years in the minors for the San Francisco Giants and the Chicago Cubs.

Actor Seth Gilliam played Blair in one episode of the ESPN mini-series The Bronx Is Burning. The mini-series chronicled the 1977 Yankees season.

On December 26, 2013, Blair suffered a heart attack and lost consciousness while playing in a celebrity bowling tournament in Pikesville, Maryland. He was taken by ambulance to Sinai Hospital in Baltimore, where he was pronounced dead.

== See also ==
- List of Major League Baseball career stolen bases leaders
- List of Major League Baseball annual triples leaders
