= Frank Baker (shortstop) =

American baseball player (born 1946)

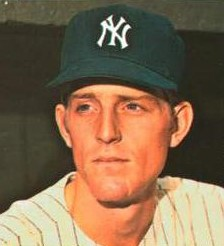
- Shortstop
- Born: October 29, 1946 (age 78); Meridian, Mississippi, U.S.
- Batted: Left Threw: Right

MLB debut
- August 9, 1970, for the New York Yankees

Last MLB appearance
- October 2, 1974, for the Baltimore Orioles

MLB statistics
- Batting average: .191
- Home runs: 1
- Runs batted in: 24
- Stats at Baseball Reference

Teams
- New York Yankees (1970–1971); Baltimore Orioles (1973–1974)

Frank Watts Baker (born October 29, 1946) is a former Major League Baseball shortstop. Baker attended school at the University of Southern Mississippi and was drafted by the New York Yankees in the 2nd round of the 1967 MLB draft.

Baker played 146 career games with the Yankees and Baltimore Orioles, with 55 hits and a .191 average.

Baker was battling cancer as of November 2018.
