= Bob Reynolds (baseball) =

American baseball player (born 1947)

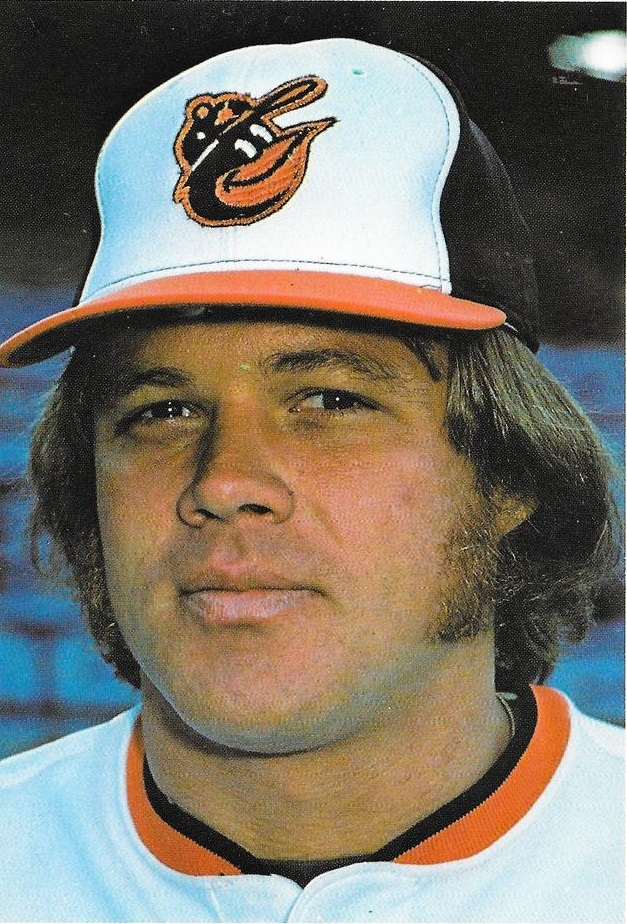
- Pitcher
- Born: January 21, 1947 (age 79); Seattle, Washington, U.S.
- Batted: Right Threw: Right

Professional debut
- MLB: September 19, 1969, for the Montreal Expos
- NPB: May 11, 1977, for the Taiyo Whales

Last appearance
- MLB: September 21, 1975, for the Cleveland Indians
- NPB: May 28, 1977, for the Taiyo Whales

MLB statistics
- Win–loss record: 14–16
- Earned run average: 3.15
- Strikeouts: 167
- Stats at Baseball Reference

Teams
- Montreal Expos (1969); St. Louis Cardinals (1971); Milwaukee Brewers (1971); Baltimore Orioles (1972–1975); Detroit Tigers (1975); Cleveland Indians (1975); Taiyo Whales (1977)

Robert Allen Reynolds (born January 21, 1947) is an American former middle-relief pitcher who played in Major League Baseball between 1969 and 1975. He batted and threw right-handed.

Listed at 6 ft 0 in (1.83 m), 205 lb., Reynolds was nicknamed "Bullet" as he could throw a baseball over 100 mph.

== Career ==
Reynolds was drafted out of Ingraham High School in Seattle, WA. He was a first round pick (18th overall) in the 1966 June amateur baseball draft, and spent 15 seasons in professional baseball. After being drafted by the San Francisco Giants, he was selected by the Montreal Expos in the 1968 MLB expansion draft.

Reynolds reached the majors in 1969 with the Expos, spending one year with them, appearing in only one MLB game in his big league debut, before moving on to the St. Louis Cardinals, Milwaukee Brewers, Baltimore Orioles, Detroit Tigers and Cleveland Indians.

His most productive season came in 1973 with Baltimore, when he recorded seven wins against five losses with a 1.95 ERA, nine saves, and had career-numbers in strikeouts (77) and innings pitched (111.0).

The next year he again went 7–5, recording seven saves and appearing in a career-high 54 games.

He also appeared in the 1973 and '74 American League Championship Series with the Orioles.

In a six-season major league career, Reynolds posted a 14–16 record with a 3.15 ERA and 21 saves in 140 games. Following his majors career, he played in Mexico and Japan with the Taiyo Whales in 1977.
