= 1973 Major League Baseball lockout =

Labor dispute in Major League Baseball history

The 1973 Major League Baseball lockout occurred from February 8 to February 25. The lockout did not result in any regular season games being canceled, but the start of spring training was delayed.

The lockout was initiated by Major League Baseball (MLB) team owners, who wanted an agreement with the Major League Baseball Players Association (MLBPA) on the use of arbitration in settling salary disputes. Resolution was reached via a three-year agreement between owners and the MLBPA, under which players with two years of consecutive major-league service (or three years of non-consecutive service) could use arbitration. Only "early" spring training (for pitchers and catchers) was impacted, as the dispute was settled before the contractual start of spring training, March 1.

== See also ==
- 1973 Major League Baseball season
