= Ken Holtzman =

American baseball pitcher (1945–2024)

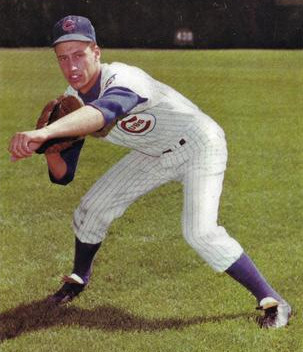
- Holtzman in 1969
- Pitcher
- Born: November 3, 1945; St. Louis, Missouri, U.S.
- Died: April 15, 2024 (aged 78); St. Louis, Missouri, U.S.
- Batted: Right Threw: Left

MLB debut
- September 4, 1965, for the Chicago Cubs

Last MLB appearance
- September 19, 1979, for the Chicago Cubs

MLB statistics
- Win–loss record: 174–150
- Earned run average: 3.49
- Strikeouts: 1,601
- Stats at Baseball Reference

Teams
- Chicago Cubs (1965–1971); Oakland Athletics (1972–1975); Baltimore Orioles (1976); New York Yankees (1976–1978); Chicago Cubs (1978–1979)

Career highlights and awards
- 2× All-Star (1972, 1973); 3× World Series champion (1972–1974); Pitched two no-hitters (1969, 1971); Chicago Cubs Hall of Fame

Kenneth Dale Holtzman (November 3, 1945 – April 15, 2024) was an American professional baseball player and coach. He was a left-handed pitcher in Major League Baseball from 1965 through 1979 for the Chicago Cubs, Oakland Athletics, Baltimore Orioles, and New York Yankees.

With the Cubs, Holtzman pitched two no-hitters. He played for the Athletics' dynasty that won three consecutive World Series championships between 1972 and 1974. A two-time All-Star, Holtzman was a 20-game-winner for the Athletics in 1973. He is a member of the Chicago Cubs Hall of Fame.

== Early life ==
Holtzman was born in St. Louis, Missouri, on November 3, 1945, to Henry and Jacqueline Holtzman. He was raised in an observant Jewish family and graduated from University City High School in St. Louis in 1963. He attended the University of Illinois Urbana-Champaign, where he played college baseball for the Illinois Fighting Illini. He graduated with a Bachelor of Arts in business administration and French.

== Career ==
=== Draft and minor leagues ===
The Chicago Cubs selected Holtzman in the fourth round of the 1965 Major League Baseball draft. At age 19, Holtzman pitched 12 games in the minor leagues in 1965, four with the Treasure Valley Cubs in the Pioneer League, and eight with the Wenatchee Chiefs in the Northwest League. He was 8–3 in the dozen starts, with a 1.99 earned run average and 114 strikeouts in 86 innings.

=== Chicago Cubs (1965–1971) ===
The Cubs promoted Holtzman to the major leagues in September 1965. After making three relief appearances in 1965, Holtzman joined the Cubs' starting rotation in 1966, and had an 11–16 rookie campaign as the team finished in last place.

As a promising Jewish left-hander, he was heralded as "the new Sandy Koufax." He pitched against Koufax in 1966 on September 25, and took the win by a 2–1 score, becoming the last pitcher to beat Koufax during the regular season. Koufax would make his last regular-season appearance a week later, on October 2. Holtzman served in the National Guard in 1967 and was available to play only on weekends. He appeared in 12 games and had a 9–0 record. After going 11–14 in 1968, he posted consecutive 17-win seasons. Holtzman was named NL Player of the Month in May 1969 with a 6–0 record, a 2.16 ERA, and 44 strikeouts.

That August 19, Holtzman pitched a no-hitter at Wrigley Field against the eventual Western Division champion Atlanta Braves, winning 3–0 on Ron Santo's three-run home run and outdueling the Braves' Phil Niekro. Holtzman had no strikeouts and three walks in the game. This was the first no-hitter by a Cub left-hander at Wrigley Field and the third no-hitter ever thrown without a strikeout (Earl Hamilton on August 30, 1912; Sad Sam Jones on September 4, 1923), a feat that has not been equaled since. In the seventh inning, Hank Aaron crushed a drive to left field that appeared to be a home run, but the wind held up the ball, enabling Billy Williams to catch the long fly ball in the recessed "well" at the wall in left field. Holtzman faced Aaron again in the ninth, and got him to ground out to second base to complete the no-hitter. The Cubs led the Eastern Division for much of the season before finishing in second place, eight games behind the eventual world champion New York Mets.

In 1970, had a 17–11 record and a 3.38 ERA, and finished third in the NL in starts (38), fifth in both strikeouts (202) and innings pitched (287 2/3), sixth in complete games (15) and ninth in wins. Baseball historian Bill James considers the Cubs' 1970 rotation of Holtzman, Ferguson Jenkins, Milt Pappas, and Bill Hands was the best of the 1970s.

On June 3, 1971, Holtzman pitched his second career no-hitter — the first ever at Riverfront Stadium — against the defending league champion Cincinnati Reds, winning the game, 1–0.

=== Oakland Athletics (1972–1975) ===
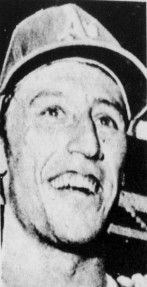
Holtzman in 1974

1975 card of Holtzman

Holtzman asked to be traded at the end of the 1971 season, so he was dealt to the Oakland Athletics in November in exchange for outfielder Rick Monday. Oakland had won the Western division in 1971 but were swept by the Baltimore Orioles in the American League Championship Series. This was just as Oakland began its run of three straight World Series titles.

Joining a staff that featured Vida Blue and Catfish Hunter, he won 19 games in 1972 (7th in the AL) and was named to the All-Star team for the first time. He lost Game 3 of the 1972 American League Championship Series against the Detroit Tigers as opposing pitcher Joe Coleman set an ALCS record with 14 strikeouts. After Oakland won the ALCS in five games, Holtzman won Game 1 of the World Series against the Reds. He started Game 4, but left in the eighth inning with a 1–0 lead and a runner on third base. The Reds scored twice to take the lead, but Oakland scored twice in the ninth inning to win 3–2. He relieved Hunter in the eighth inning of Game 7 with a 3–1 lead but after surrendering a double to Joe Morgan, he was replaced by Rollie Fingers. The A's hung on for a 3–2 win to win the series.

In 1973, Holtzman led the A's with a 2.97 ERA (6th best in the league) as each of their three top starters won 20 or more games. He was again an All-Star, going 21–13 in 40 starts (his 21 wins 4th-best in the AL) with 157 strikeouts. Over the next 33 years only two other left-handers had as many starts in a season. In the 1973 ALCS against the Baltimore Orioles, he won an 11-inning 2–1 duel against Mike Cuellar in Game 3 when Bert Campaneris homered to lead off the last inning. He started three times in the 1973 World Series against the Mets, winning Game 1 2–1. He lasted only 1/3 of an inning in Game 4, departing after a 3-run homer by Rusty Staub, which was followed by two more base runners. He recovered to win Game 7, leaving in the 6th inning with a 5–1 lead as the A's won the game 5–2 and their second straight title. In both his victories, he doubled and also scored the first run for the A's after not having batted all season due to the American League using the designated hitter for the first time in the 1973 season.

Holtzman again won 19 games in 1974, but this time endured 17 losses despite his 3.07 ERA, which ranked 11th in the League. Facing the Orioles in the 1974 ALCS, he pitched a 5–0 shutout in Game 2, taking a one-hitter into the eighth inning and allowing only five singles. Against the Los Angeles Dodgers in the World Series, he started Game 1 but was pulled in the fifth inning with a 2–1 lead; the A's went on to win 3–2. He won Game 4 5–2, hitting a home run off Andy Messersmith in the third inning for a 1–0 lead.

After losing in salary arbitration in February, Holtzman had an 18–14 record for the 1975 A's as they won their fifth straight American League Western Division title. On June 8, against the Detroit Tigers, he had what would have been his third career no-hitter broken up with two out in the ninth by a Tom Veryzer double. He would have become the third pitcher (after Cy Young and Jim Bunning) to pitch no-hitters in both leagues. Holtzman lost Games 1 and 3 of the ALCS to the Boston Red Sox as the A's were swept. He was fourth in the AL in games started (38), sixth in hits allowed per 9 innings pitched (7.33), and seventh in wins.

=== Later career ===
Paid $93,000 in 1975 and one of nine Oakland players refusing to sign 1976 contracts, Holtzman sought a three-year $460,000 pact. With free agency imminent after the season and the expectations of higher salaries for which Athletics owner Finley was unwilling to pay, he was acquired along with Reggie Jackson and minor-league right-handed pitcher Bill Van Bommel by the Orioles for Don Baylor, Mike Torrez, and Paul Mitchell on April 2, 1976. When Jackson received a $60,000 raise to end his season-opening holdout, Holtzman accused Orioles general manager Hank Peters of a "double standard" for continuing to impose an automatic 20% pay cut on him and eight other unsigned teammates. A proposed trade that would've sent him and Bobby Grich to the Kansas City Royals but was dependent on him signing a contract failed to materialize on June 13.

Holtzman was dealt along with Doyle Alexander, Elrod Hendricks, Grant Jackson, and Jimmy Freeman from the Orioles to the New York Yankees for Rick Dempsey, Scott McGregor, Tippy Martinez, Rudy May, and Dave Pagan just before the non-waiver trade deadline on June 15, 1976. He posted a 12–10 record for the Yankees over three years, but his playing time was increasingly limited. He did not appear in the 1976 or 1977 postseasons with New York. In June 1978, after making five appearances for the Yankees, they traded him to the Cubs for Ron Davis. He ended his career with Chicago in 1979, going 6–9 with a 4.59 ERA.

Over 15 years, he had a 174–150 record with a 3.49 ERA, 1,601 strikeouts, and 31 shutouts in 451 games and 2,867 1/3 innings. He held batters to a .220 batting average with 2 outs and runners in scoring position. His 80 victories with Chicago were the fourth most by a left-hander, behind Hippo Vaughn (151), Larry French (95), and Dick Ellsworth (84). He received four votes in Baseball Hall of Fame voting in 1985, and five in 1986.

Amongst Jewish pitchers, Holtzman's 174 career victories are the most in the major league baseball, nine more than Sandy Koufax's 165. As of 2010, Holtzman's 1,601 strikeouts were second (behind Koufax), and his 451 games were second (behind Scott Schoeneweis) amongst Jewish pitchers. He held the record for most pitching appearances by a Jewish pitcher until 1998, when Scott Radinsky passed him to become the major league leader in appearances. His 3.49 ERA was fifth (behind Koufax, Radinsky, Barney Pelty, and Erskine Mayer).

== Post-baseball career ==
Holtzman went on to attempt a career as an insurance salesman. He also worked for the St. Louis Jewish Community Center. He coached the St. Louis baseball team for the Maccabiah Games for a few years and is a member of the Chicagoland Sports Hall of Fame, St. Louis Sports Hall of Fame, St. Louis Jewish Sports Hall of Fame, and the University of Illinois Athletics Hall of Fame.

Holtzman managed the Petach Tikva Pioneers in the inaugural 2007 season of the Israel Baseball League, but left in the middle of the season, unhappy with the way the league was run.

== Personal life and death ==
Holtzman had three daughters with his ex-wife Michelle.

Ken Holtzman died in St. Louis on April 15, 2024, after battling heart issues. He was 78, and had been hospitalized for three weeks prior to his death. After a funeral service on April 17, his body was interred at Chesed Shel Emeth Cemetery in Chesterfield, Missouri.

== See also ==
- List of Jewish Major League Baseball players
- List of World Series starting pitchers

Awards and achievements
Preceded by Willie McCovey	Major League Player of the Month; May 1969	Succeeded by Ron Santo
Preceded by Jim Palmer; Vida Blue	No-hitter pitcher August 19, 1969; June 3, 1971	Succeeded by Bob Moose; Rick Wise
