= Mark Belanger =

American baseball player (1944–1998)

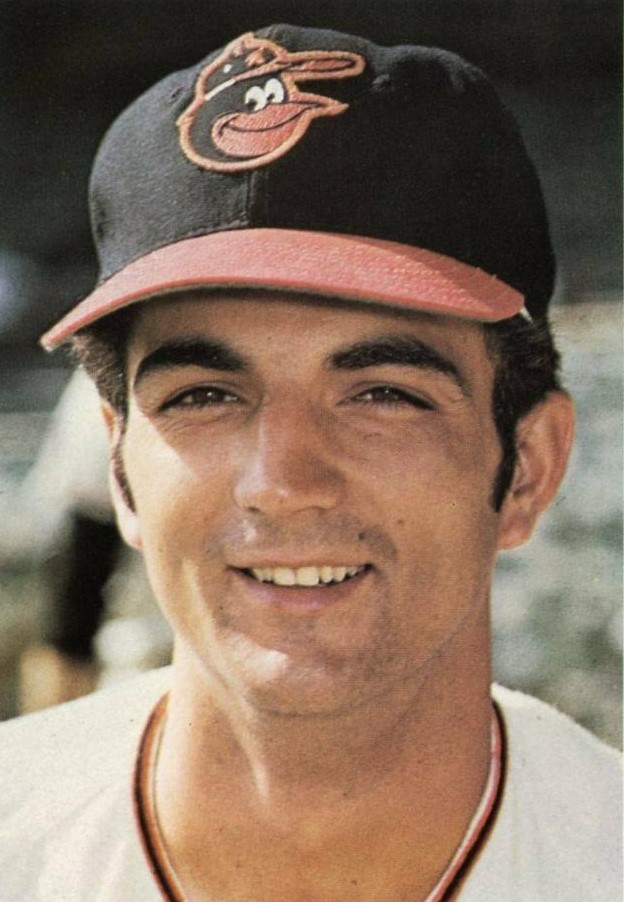
- Belanger with the Baltimore Orioles in 1972
- Shortstop
- Born: June 8, 1944; Pittsfield, Massachusetts, U.S.
- Died: October 6, 1998 (aged 54); New York, New York, U.S.
- Batted: Right Threw: Right

MLB debut
- August 7, 1965, for the Baltimore Orioles

Last MLB appearance
- October 2, 1982, for the Los Angeles Dodgers

MLB statistics
- Batting average: .228
- Home runs: 20
- Runs batted in: 389
- Stats at Baseball Reference

Teams
- Baltimore Orioles (1965–1981); Los Angeles Dodgers (1982)

Career highlights and awards
- All-Star (1976); World Series champion (1970); 8× Gold Glove Award (1969, 1971, 1973–1978); Baltimore Orioles Hall of Fame

Mark Henry Belanger (June 8, 1944 – October 6, 1998), nicknamed "the Blade", was an American professional baseball player and coach. He played 18 seasons in Major League Baseball as a shortstop from 1965 through 1982, most notably as a member of the Baltimore Orioles dynasty that won six American League East division titles, five American League pennants, and two World Series championships between 1966 and 1979.

A defensive standout, Belanger won eight Gold Glove Awards between 1969 and 1978, leading the American League in assists and fielding percentage three times each; he retired with the highest career fielding percentage by an AL shortstop (.977). In defensive Wins Above Replacement (WAR), Belanger is tied with Ozzie Smith and Joe Tinker for most times as league leader with six. Belanger set franchise records for career games, assists, and double plays as a shortstop, all of which were later broken by Cal Ripken Jr. After his playing career, he became an official with the Major League Baseball Players Association. In 1983, Belanger was inducted into the Baltimore Orioles Hall of Fame. He has been described as "the most electrifying defensive shortstop of his generation".

== Early life ==
Belanger was born on June 8, 1944, in Pittsfield, Massachusetts, of French-Canadian and Italian-American descent. He attended Pittsfield High School, where he played baseball and basketball. On the basketball court, he became the school's first 1,000-point scorer, scoring 1,455 points in three years. He led his team to the 1962 Western Massachusetts championship game and a 59-10 record over those three years.

== Career ==
=== Minor leagues ===
He was recruited by the Orioles as an amateur in 1962, and signed for $35,000 shortly after turning 18-years old. He was then assigned to the Class-D Bluefield Orioles, where he hit .298, while playing shortstop; also playing eight games that season for the Single-A Elmira Pioneers. His manager at Elmira was future Hall of Fame manager Earl Weaver, and included future Orioles Andy Etchebarren, Dave McNally and Darold Knowles. He spent 1963 in the U.S. Air National Guard, and returned to the Orioles minor league system in 1964, playing shortstop for the Single-A Aberdeen Pheasants, batting .226, with a .958 fielding percentage. He did go to Orioles spring training in 1963, where Orioles shortstop Ron Hansen gave Belanger fielding advice that would positively effect how Belanger played shortstop going forward.

Belanger spent the majority of the 1965 season with now Double-A Elmira, again managed by Weaver, where he had a .968 fielding percentage. He was called up for 11 games with the Orioles, making his debut with the club on August 7, 1965 as a pinch runner. In 1966, he played for the Triple-A Rochester Red Wings, also managed by Weaver, batting .262, with six home runs and a .974 fielding percentage; playing in eight games with the Orioles at the end of the season.

=== Major leagues ===
He took over as the Orioles' regular shortstop in late 1967 from future Hall of Famer Luis Aparicio, and held the position for more than a decade. He hit his first Major League home run at Yankee Stadium on May 14, 1967, off Yankees' ace Mel Stottlemyre. This was in the same game that Mickey Mantle hit his 500th home run.

Belanger was nicknamed "The Blade" because of his tall, narrow and angular frame—6 ft 1 in (1.85 m) and 170 pounds (77 kg). Belanger was a flashy fielder and won eight AL Gold Gloves (1969, 1971, and 1973–78). As of 2025, he was second all-time in defensive WAR, behind only Ozzie Smith and just above teammate third baseman Brooks Robinson. He was also named to the All-Star team in 1976.

Belanger joined a select group of shortstop-second baseman combinations who each won Gold Gloves in the same season while playing together (in 1969 and 1971 with Davey Johnson and again with Bobby Grich each year between 1973 and 1976). Because Brooks Robinson won the AL Gold Glove at third base each season during the 1960–1975 stretch, the left side of the Orioles' infield was seemingly impenetrable, described by Detroit Tigers manager Mayo Smith as like "'trying to throw a hamburger through a brick wall'". Along with eight-time gold glove center fielder Paul Blair, the Orioles defense from 1969-73 is considered among the greatest ever; and Belanger and Robinson are considered among the greatest fielders ever.

Despite his reputation as one of the best fielding shortstops in Major League history, Belanger was generally a poor hitter. In 1970, he finished last among qualifying AL players in all three Triple Crown categories. In his 18 seasons in the Major Leagues, Belanger hit only 20 home runs and had a lifetime batting average of .228, only topping the .230 mark over a full season three times. At the time he retired, he had been pinch-hit for 333 times, the most in American League history at the time.

His .228 lifetime batting average is the third-lowest of any Major League player with more than 5,000 career at bats, ahead of only George McBride (.218) and Ed Brinkman (.224; another gold glove shortstop of that era). His 1,316 hits is the lowest amount for all players to have played 2,000 games.

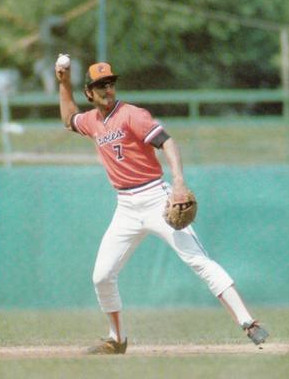
Belanger in 1977

He hit a rare home run in the first American League Championship Series game ever played in 1969. After hitting .333 in the 1970 ALCS, his contributions helped the Orioles to a 1970 World Series victory, the team's second title in five years. During the series, Belanger caught a line drive to end a 4–3 victory in Game 1 with the tying run on first base, and he had an assist to end Game 3. Belanger played in six ALCS series and set league playoff records for career games, putouts, assists, total chances, and double plays by a shortstop. His playoff records were later broken between 1998 and 2002 by Omar Vizquel and Derek Jeter.

In 1969, Belanger had his best offensive season, after instruction from Charlie Lau. He also won his first Gold Glove award. He hit .287 with 50 RBIs and 76 runs scored. He was 29th in the voting for the 1969 American League Most Valuable Player award. He finished 21st in the MVP voting in 1973 while hitting only .226 with no home runs and 27 RBIs, and 26th in 1974 with a .225 batting average, five home runs and 36 RBIs. Belanger won Gold Glove awards in both of those years.

On June 3, 1977, Belanger was part of what sportswriter Fred Rothenberg called "one of the strangest triple plays in baseball history." With the bases loaded for the Royals in the ninth inning, and Kansas City down 7–5, John Wathan hit a fly ball to right field that Pat Kelly caught for the first out. All the runners tagged to advance a base, but Kelly threw to Belanger, who caught Freddie Patek in a rundown between first and second base and tagged him out. While this was going on, Dave Nelson, who had successfully advanced to third base, attempted to score. Upon tagging out Patek, Belanger ran towards the third base line and caught up with Nelson ten feet from home plate, tagging him out to complete the triple play and end the game.

Belanger was granted free agency in 1981 and signed with the Los Angeles Dodgers for the 1982 season; he retired at the end of the season.

Following Belanger's departure from the Orioles, former teammate Rich Dauer said, "Anyone would miss Mark Belanger. You're talking about the greatest shortstop in the world. He never put you in a bad position with his double-play throws...He'd put you where you should be to make the play... I never had to think out there. If there was any question in my mind, I'd look at Blade, and he'd have a finger out, pointing which way I should move."

Hall of Fame manager Earl Weaver, who managed Belanger's minor league teams in Elmira and Rochester, and then managed him with the Orioles, once told Belanger, "'You’re my shortstop if you hit .0001.'" In the 1960s, future Hall of Fame manager Whitey Herzog, after seeing Belanger play in the minor leagues for only seven days, said Belanger was the best shortstop he had ever seen.

In 1983, Belanger was inducted into the Baltimore Orioles Hall of Fame. In 2019, he was inducted into the Western Massachusetts Baseball Hall of Fame.

== Later life ==
Belanger served as the Orioles' union representative for several years. He was one of the four players who led negotiations during the 1981 strike.

After Belanger's retirement as an active player and until his death, he was employed by the MLB Players Association as a liaison to its membership. He worked closely with its chief counsel Donald Fehr.

Belanger and his first wife, Daryl (Dee), had homes in Timonium, Maryland, and Key Biscayne, Florida. They had two sons, Richard and Robert. Belanger and his wife Dee frequently hosted Orioles players at their homes. He married his second wife, Virginia French, who survived him, in early 1997.

A long-time cigarette smoker, Belanger was diagnosed with lung cancer in the late 1990s and died in New York City at the age of 54. He was survived by his second wife, Virginia, his two sons, his parents, and three siblings. He is interred in St. Joseph Cemetery in Pittsfield, Massachusetts.

== See also ==
- List of Gold Glove middle infield duos
