= Andy Etchebarren =

American baseball player and manager (1943–2019)

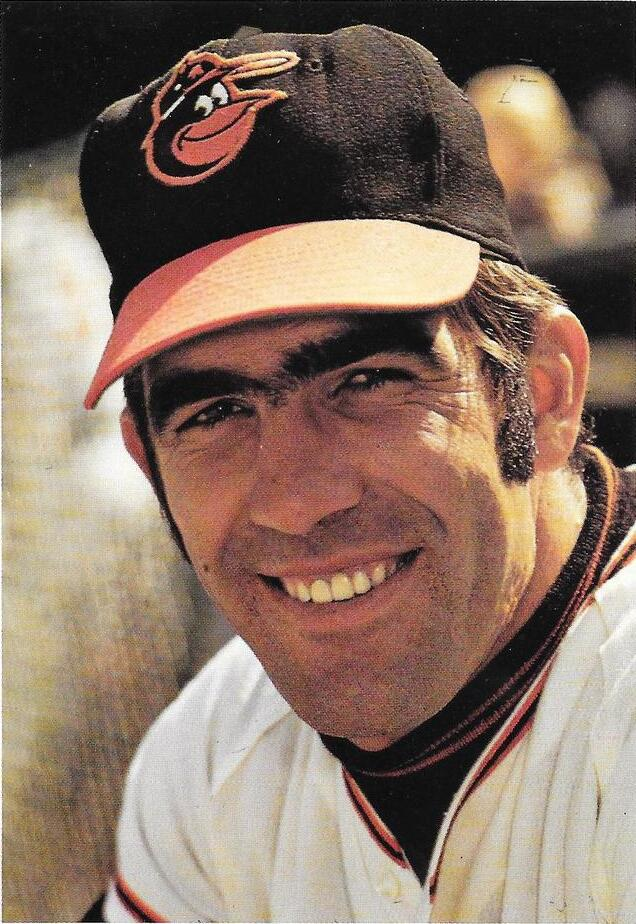
- Catcher
- Born: June 20, 1943; Whittier, California, U.S.
- Died: October 5, 2019 (aged 76); Santee, California, U.S.
- Batted: Right Threw: Right

MLB debut
- September 26, 1962, for the Baltimore Orioles

Last MLB appearance
- April 20, 1978, for the Milwaukee Brewers

MLB statistics
- Batting average: .235
- Home runs: 49
- Runs batted in: 309
- Stats at Baseball Reference

Teams
- Baltimore Orioles (1962, 1965–1975); California Angels (1975–1977); Milwaukee Brewers (1978)

Career highlights and awards
- 2× All-Star (1966, 1967); 2× World Series champion (1966, 1970)

Andrew Auguste Etchebarren (June 20, 1943 – October 5, 2019) was an American professional baseball player and minor league manager. He played for 15 seasons in Major League Baseball as a catcher in 1962 and then from 1965 through 1978, most notably as a member of the Baltimore Orioles dynasty that won four American League pennants and two World Series championships between 1966 and 1971. A two-time All-Star, Etchebarren also played for the California Angels and the Milwaukee Brewers. After his playing career, he became a coach and managed 16 seasons in the minor leagues.

== Early life ==
Etchebarren was born on June 20, 1943, in Whittier, California of Basque descent. He attended La Puente High School in La Puente, California, and was the first player from his high school to reach major league baseball. He was named to the first-team All-Montview League in 1959 at third base. As a high school football player, he was named to The Daily Report newspaper's All-Montview League team in 1958, and made honorable mention in 1959.

== Playing career ==
Etchebarren was signed by Harry Dalton of the Baltimore Orioles as an amateur free agent in 1961. He was assigned to the Class-C Aberdeen Pheasants in 1961, and then to the Single-A Elmira Pioneers in 1962. Elmira was managed by future Hall of Fame manager Earl Weaver, and Etchebarren's teammates included future Orioles stars Mark Belanger and pitcher Dave McNally. He and McNally played in their first major league game for the Orioles on September 26, 1962, with McNally the starting pitcher and Etchebarren the starting catcher. McNally threw a two-hit shutout and Etchebarren was one-for-three hitting.

Etchebarren spent all of 1963-64 in the minor leagues and played the majority of 1965 for the Triple-A Oriole affiliate, the Rochester Red Wings, his teammates including future Orioles Paul Blair, Davey Johnson, Darold Knowles, Tom Phoebus and Eddie Watt. He came up for five games with the Orioles, with only six at bats in 1965. He was a major league quality defensive catcher, but there were questions about his hitting ability.

Expected to be the Orioles' third-string catcher entering his MLB rookie season in 1966, he became the starter in spring training when Dick Brown underwent surgery to remove a brain tumor and Charley Lau injured an elbow in the same timeframe. He started 118 games at catcher, with a .989 fielding percentage. He had a strong start to the year, and was named to the All-Star team (as he would also be named in 1967). However, he was injured in July and missed playing time later in the year. The Orioles won the American League pennant and defeated the Los Angeles Dodgers 4–0 in the 1966 World Series. Etchebarren was the last man in major league baseball to bat against Sandy Koufax, when he hit into a double play during the sixth inning of Game 2 of the 1966 World Series.

Etchebarren finished 17th in voting for the 1966 American League Most Valuable Player Award for playing in 121 games, having 412 at bats, 49 runs, 91 hits, 14 doubles, 6 triples, 11 home runs, 50 runs batted in (RBI), 38 walks, a .221 batting average, a .293 on-base percentage, a .364 slugging percentage, 150 total bases, 3 sacrifice flies, and 12 intentional walks.

Etchebarren started 94 games in 1967 and 56 games in 1968. After 1967, Etchebarren never started more than 65 games for the Orioles. Earl Weaver became manager during 1968 and would continue as Etchebarren's manager through his remaining years with the Orioles. Under Weaver, the right-handed hitting Etchebarren would be platooned with left-handed hitting Elrod Hendricks from 1968-1971. He was platooned with left-handed hitting catcher Johnny Oates in 1972, and then played as a backup at catcher to Earl Williams in 1973-74.

After Etchebarren lost his starting catcher position to Dave Duncan due to injuries during the first week of the 1975 season, his contract was sold by the Orioles to the California Angels at the trade deadline on June 15. He had threatened to retire if he was not sent to his native state of California. Etchebarren finished the 1975 season with the Angels, and played there from 1976-77. His rights were sold to the Milwaukee Brewers in December 1977, and he finished his major league career playing four games for the Brewers in 1978.

In 15 seasons he played in 948 games and had 2,618 at-bats, 245 runs, 615 hits, 101 doubles, 17 triples, 49 home runs, 309 runs batted in, 13 stolen bases, 246 walks, a .235 batting average, a .306 on-base percentage, a .343 slugging percentage, 897 total bases, 20 sacrifice hits, 19 sacrifice flies and 41 intentional walks. Defensively, he recorded a .987 fielding percentage. Etchebarren helped the Orioles to win the 1966 and 1970 World Series, 1969 and 1971 American League pennants, and the 1973 and 1974 American League Eastern Division championships.

=== Saving Frank Robinson ===
It has been said that Etchebarren's most important contribution to the Orioles was in 1966, during a swimming pool party the players held on an off day in August. Frank Robinson, who would go on to win the triple crown and American League Most Valuable Player award in 1966, was drowning in the deep end of the pool. Unknown to the others, Robinson could not swim. Etchebarren and teammate Davey Johnson spotted Robinson struggling and dove into the pool and pulled Robinson to safety.

== Managerial and coaching career ==
Etchebarren became the Milwaukee Brewers’ minor league catching instructor in 1982. He was the Orioles bench coach from 1996 to 1997 under manager Davey Johnson. In 2000 Etchebarren was manager of the Bowie Baysox of the Eastern League, and in 2001 and 2002 manager of the Rochester Red Wings of the International League. He served as manager of the Aberdeen IronBirds of the New York–Penn League for three seasons until his dismissal from that position on October 22, 2007. He was the manager of the York Revolution of the Atlantic League, a team partly owned by Brooks Robinson, and led the team to a pair of league championships in 2010 and 2011. He was known for his passion in managing the team. He retired from baseball following the 2012 season.

== Death ==
Etchebarren died on October 5, 2019, at age 76.

Preceded by Chuck Cottier	Baltimore Orioles Bench Coach; 1996–1997	Succeeded by Eddie Murray
Preceded by Tommy Shields	Frederick Keys Manager; 1999	Succeeded by Dave Machemer
Preceded by Joe Ferguson	Bowie Baysox Manager; 2000	Succeeded by Dave Machemer
