= Bobby Grich =

American baseball player (born 1949)

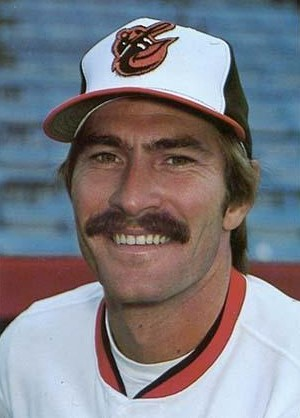
- Grich with the Baltimore Orioles in 1976
- Second baseman
- Born: January 15, 1949 (age 77); Muskegon, Michigan, U.S.
- Batted: Right Threw: Right

MLB debut
- June 29, 1970, for the Baltimore Orioles

Last MLB appearance
- October 2, 1986, for the California Angels

MLB statistics
- Batting average: .266
- Home runs: 224
- Runs batted in: 864
- Stats at Baseball Reference

Teams
- Baltimore Orioles (1970–1976); California Angels (1977–1986)

Career highlights and awards
- 6× All-Star (1972, 1974, 1976, 1979, 1980, 1982); 4× Gold Glove Award (1973–1976); Silver Slugger Award (1981); AL home run leader (1981); Baltimore Orioles Hall of Fame; Angels Hall of Fame

Robert Anthony Grich (born January 15, 1949) is an American former professional baseball player. He played in Major League Baseball (MLB) as a second baseman for the Baltimore Orioles (1970–1976) and the California Angels (1977–1986).

In 1981, Grich led the American League in home runs and won a Silver Slugger Award. A six-time All-Star, he also excelled as a defensive player, winning four consecutive Gold Glove Awards between 1973 and 1976.

In 1988, Grich became the first inductee into the California Angels Hall of Fame; he was inducted into the Baltimore Orioles Hall of Fame in 1998. Grich currently works in the Angels' front office.

== Early life ==
Grich attended Woodrow Wilson High School in Long Beach, California, and graduated in 1967. He was selected by the Baltimore Orioles in the first round (19th overall) of the 1967 Major League Baseball draft.

== Baseball career ==
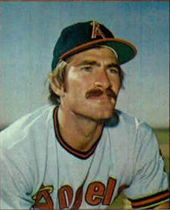
1978 card of Grich for California Angels

Grich made his major league debut with Baltimore midway through the 1970 season at the age of 21. He struggled early in his career and received "encouragement" from manager Earl Weaver, who would say "Home run in Rochester" to him each time he flied out; in Rochester, he batted .383. That October, the Orioles defeated the Cincinnati Reds to win the World Series, with him on the playoff roster but not seeing any action.

From 1969 through 1974, the Orioles featured a loaded roster that resulted in five AL East Division titles in six seasons. In 1971, he excelled when with the Rochester Red Wings, winning the International League Most Valuable Player Award of the International League; so important was Grich that, when he had obligations that didn't let him play (such as military service or a late promotion to Baltimore), the Red Wings went 1-11 without him. Grich's emergence was blocked by incumbent second baseman Davey Johnson, but the Orioles thought highly of Grich and traded Johnson to the Braves following the 1972 season, when the Orioles finished third in the division.

In 1973, Grich set the all-time major league fielding record at second base with a .995 fielding percentage, and 12 seasons later in 1985, he raised the record to .997. He won four consecutive Gold Glove Awards and made the American League All-Star squad six times. He was an excellent fielder, with good range, soft hands, and a good arm, and he was steady turning the double play. He credited Orioles hitting instructor Jim Frey for helping him improve his swing. He also learned infield defensive play from future Hall of Fame teammate Brooks Robinson, specifically, positioning his feet close together to get a better jump on a batted ball.

Grich became a free agent following the 1976 season and signed a multi-year contract with the California Angels. The Orioles offered him $1.2 million and the New York Yankees offered $2.2 million, but Grich accepted the Angels and their offer of $1.5 million due to a desire to play closer to home. The Angels originally planned to move Grich to shortstop, as they had Jerry Remy at second. However, Grich suffered a herniated disk in his back trying to move an air-conditioning unit during the 1977 season and played in only 52 games. The Angels traded Remy to the Boston Red Sox for Don Aase and moved Grich back to second for the 1978 season. Grich batted .294 in 1979, adding 30 homers and 101 RBI as the Angels made the postseason in 1979 for the first time ever as champions of the American League West. So happy was the team in celebration that when former President Richard Nixon came out to the clubhouse to congratulate them Grich dumped a can of beer over Nixon's head.

In the strike-shortened 1981 season, Grich tied for the league lead in home runs (22, along with Tony Armas, Dwight Evans, and Eddie Murray), led in slugging average (.543), and hit a career-high .304.

While with the Orioles, Grich appeared in the American League Championship Series (ALCS) in 1973 and 1974, when Baltimore lost to Oakland.

=== Retirement after 1986 ALCS ===
The Angels made their first three postseason appearances during Grich's tenure, but fell in the ALCS each time; losing to the Orioles in 1979 and to the Milwaukee Brewers in 1982. Grich came closest in his final MLB season (1986), when the Angels led the ALCS 3-1 and needed just one more win to advance to the World Series. They blew a 5–2 lead to the Boston Red Sox in the ninth inning of Game 5, then lost the next two and were eliminated. Grich hit a home run in Game 5 that deflected off center fielder Dave Henderson's glove, putting the Angels on top 3–2. But with the Red Sox down to their final strike, Henderson hit a home run to put Boston ahead. The Red Sox would go on to win the game in extra innings and take the final two games in Fenway Park to complete the comeback and win the AL pennant. In the post-game interviews following Game 7, Grich announced his retirement at the age of 37.

=== Career stats ===
Over 17 major league seasons, Grich batted .266, with 320 doubles, 47 triples, 224 home runs, 864 runs batted in (RBI), 1,033 runs, 1,833 hits, 1,087 bases on balls, 104 stolen bases, and a .371 on-base percentage in 2,008 games played.

Commenting on his baseball career, he stated: "I was short on talent so I had to be long on intensity."

== Career highlights ==
- 6-time All-Star (1972, 1974, 1976, 1979–80, 1982)
- 4-time Gold Glove (1973–1976)
- Twice top 10 in MVP voting (1974, 1979)
- Led league in slugging percentage (1981)
- Led league in home runs (1981)
- First second baseman to lead AL in home runs since Nap Lajoie (1901) and in either league since Rogers Hornsby (1929).
- Hit three consecutive home runs in a game (1974)
- Set an AL 2B record with 484 putouts in a season (1974)
- The first player elected to the Angels' Hall of Fame (1996)

== Hall of Fame candidacy ==
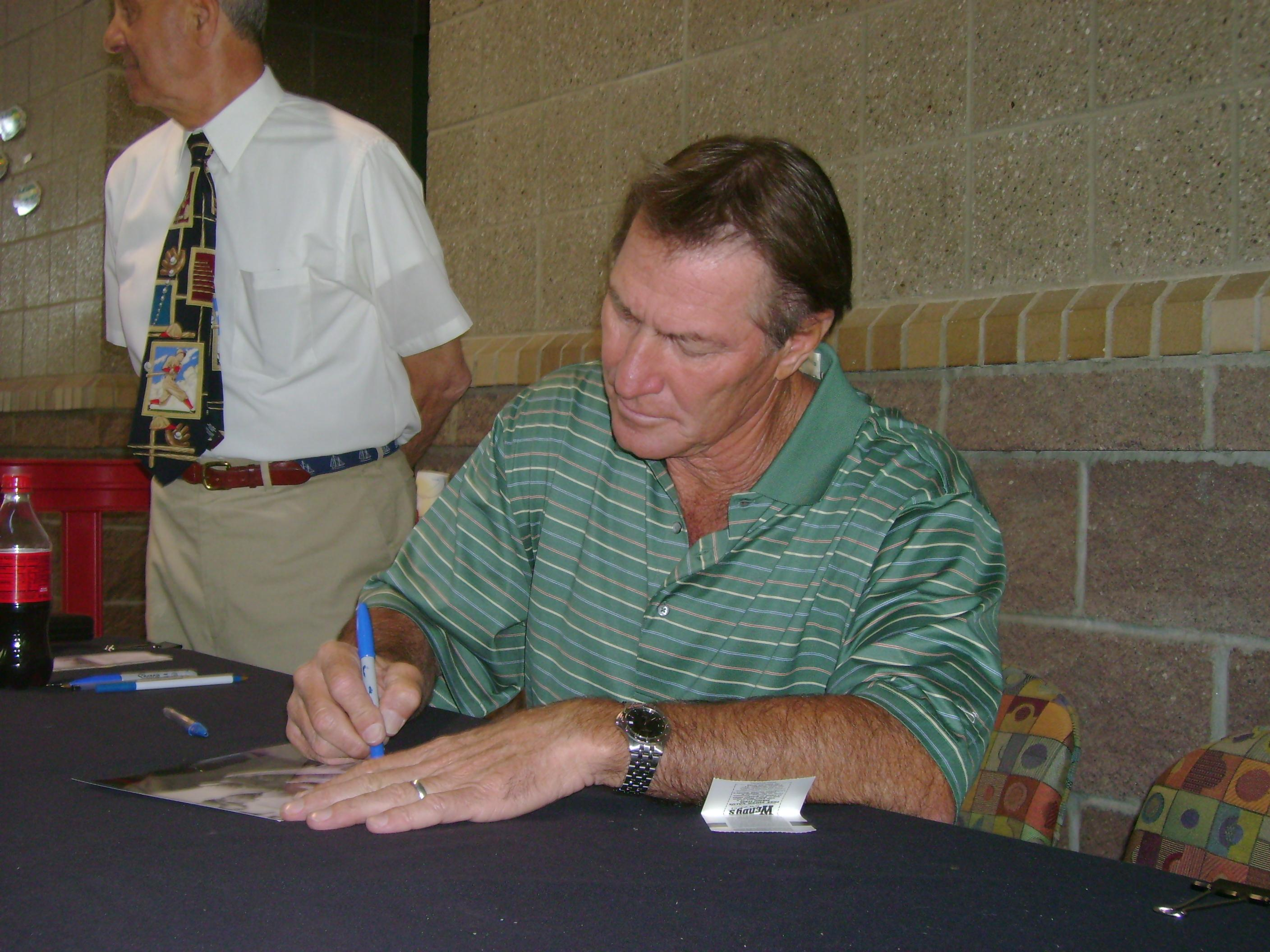
Grich in 2008

Grich became eligible for the National Baseball Hall of Fame in 1992. In the BBWAA election, he received 11 votes, or 2.6% of the vote of the baseball writers eligible to vote who saw him play, below the 5% threshold needed to stay on the ballot. He was therefore removed from future BBWAA ballots.

Using statistics alone a sabermetric case for Grich can be built to be in the Hall of Fame. As of 2017, he has the highest Jaffe Wins Above Replacement Score (JAWS) of any eligible position player not in the Hall of Fame, although his total WAR is lower than that of Bill Dahlen and fellow second baseman Lou Whitaker; of the three second basemen inducted into the Hall of Fame (excluding Veterans Committee picks) since 1992, Grich has a higher WAR than all three. There are more than ten Hall of Fame second basemen with a lower JAWS. The JAWS statistic is particularly compelling given that it incorporates both career and peak year statistics. His 224 home runs as a second baseman ranks highly among the Hall of Famers in the position, as he ranked fourth all-time upon his retirement. In fact, from 1970 to 1986 (the time in which Grich played his career), only Joe Morgan hit more than Grich (228), and Grich was second in additional categories such as RBI, runs scored, hits, doubles, and walks. In OPS+ for second basemen that played 80% percent at the position with at least 1,000 games played, Grich is tied for 6th best all-time with a 125 OPS+.

In the 2019 edition of the Bill James Handbook, James listed Grich as the 5th best position player missing from the Hall, and MLB historian John Thorn has called Grich the one player deserving being reconsidered for the Hall of Fame.
