= 1970 Baltimore Orioles season =

Major League Baseball season

1970 Baltimore Orioles
- World Series champions American League champions American League East champions
- League: American League
- Division: East
- Ballpark: Memorial Stadium
- City: Baltimore, Maryland
- Record: 108–54 (.667)
- Divisional place: 1st
- Owners: Jerold Hoffberger
- General managers: Harry Dalton
- Managers: Earl Weaver
- Television: WJZ-TV
- Radio: WBAL (AM) (Chuck Thompson, Bill O'Donnell)

The 1970 Baltimore Orioles season involved the Orioles finishing first in the American League East with a record of 108 wins and 54 losses, 15 games ahead of the runner-up New York Yankees. The Orioles put together one of the most dominant postseason runs of all time, scoring 60 runs in just eight games as they swept the Minnesota Twins for the second straight year in the American League Championship Series and then went on to win their second World Series title over the National League champion Cincinnati Reds in five games, thanks to the glove of third baseman Brooks Robinson.

The team was managed by Earl Weaver, and played their home games at Memorial Stadium.

== Offseason ==
- December 1, 1969: Tom Shopay was drafted by the Orioles from the New York Yankees in the 1969 rule 5 draft.
- January 17, 1970: Doug DeCinces was drafted by the Orioles in the 3rd round of the 1970 Major League Baseball draft (secondary phase).

== Regular season ==
=== Bouncing back from 1969 ===
Following their upset loss to the New York Mets in the 1969 World Series, the Orioles picked up where they left off in 1969. They opened the season with five wins and ran away with their second straight American League East title, beating back a challenge from the New York Yankees in June. They won 19 of their last 22 games to finish with a 108-win season, one win fewer than the previous year.

The team was mostly the same as 1969. Starting pitchers Mike Cuellar, Dave McNally, and Jim Palmer each won at least 20 games, and the veteran bullpen seldom faltered. On defense, Brooks Robinson, center fielder Paul Blair, and second baseman Davey Johnson won Gold Gloves. Offensively, first baseman Boog Powell was the AL's Most Valuable Player, leading the team with 35 home runs and 114 RBIs. Don Buford and Blair continued to get on base, and Frank Robinson (.306, 25 home runs), Brooks Robinson (94 RBIs), and Powell continued to drive them home. Elrod Hendricks led a catching platoon that produced 17 homers and 74 RBIs, and outfielder Merv Rettenmund, a product of the farm system, hit .322 with 18 home runs and 58 RBI. The Minnesota Twins were the only team in the American League to have a winning record in the regular season versus the Baltimore Orioles.

=== Injury to Paul Blair ===
There was a sobering moment early in the season when Blair was beaned on May 31 in Anaheim, California. The California Angels' Ken Tatum threw a pitch that hit Blair in the face. Blair was seemingly on his way to a second straight strong season after having 26 home runs and 76 RBIs in 1969. He missed three weeks after the beaning, coming back to finish with 18 home runs and 65 RBIs, but he seldom produced that well over the rest of his career, and some speculated he was never the same at the plate.

=== The return of Moe Drabowsky ===
One personnel change from '69 to '70 was the return of Moe Drabowsky, the eminent prankster relief pitcher who had been lost to the Kansas City Royals in the expansion draft before the '69 season. Now 34 and near the end of his career, he was reacquired during the '70 season and won four of six decisions, helping fill out a veteran bullpen.

=== Season standings ===
AL East
Team	W	L	Pct.	GB	Home	Road
Baltimore Orioles	108	54	.667	—	59‍–‍22	49‍–‍32
New York Yankees	93	69	.574	15	53‍–‍28	40‍–‍41
Boston Red Sox	87	75	.537	21	52‍–‍29	35‍–‍46
Detroit Tigers	79	83	.488	29	42‍–‍39	37‍–‍44
Cleveland Indians	76	86	.469	32	43‍–‍38	33‍–‍48
Washington Senators	70	92	.432	38	40‍–‍41	30‍–‍51

=== Record vs. opponents ===
1970 American League record Sources:
Team	BAL	BOS	CAL	CWS	CLE	DET	KC	MIL	MIN	NYY	OAK	WAS
Baltimore	—	13–5	7–5	9–3	14–4	11–7	12–0	7–5	5–7	11–7	7–5	12–6
Boston	5–13	—	5–7	8–4	12–6	9–9	7–5	5–7	7–5	10–8	7–5	12–6
California	5–7	7–5	—	12–6	6–6	6–6	10–8	12–6	8–10	5–7	8–10	7–5
Chicago	3–9	4–8	6–12	—	6–6	6–6	7–11	7–11	6–12	5–7	2–16	4–8
Cleveland	4–14	6–12	6–6	6–6	—	7–11	8–4	7–5	6–6	8–10	7–5	11–7
Detroit	7–11	9–9	6–6	6–6	11–7	—	6–6	8–4	4–8	7–11	6–6	9–9
Kansas City	0–12	5–7	8–10	11–7	4–8	6–6	—	12–6	5–13	1–11	7–11	6–6
Milwaukee	5–7	7–5	6–12	11–7	5–7	4–8	6–12	—	5–13	3–9–1	8–10	5–7
Minnesota	7–5	5–7	10–8	12–6	6–6	8–4	13–5	13–5	—	5–7	13–5	6–6
New York	7–11	8–10	7–5	7–5	10–8	11–7	11–1	9–3–1	7–5	—	6–6	10–8
Oakland	5–7	5–7	10–8	16–2	5–7	6–6	11–7	10–8	5–13	6–6	—	10–2
Washington	6–12	6–12	5–7	8–4	7–11	9–9	6–6	7–5	6–6	8–10	2–10	—

=== Notable transactions ===
- June 4, 1970: Rob Andrews was drafted by the Orioles in the 10th round of the 1970 Major League Baseball draft.

=== Roster ===
1970 Baltimore Orioles
Roster
Pitchers: 33 Fred Beene; 35 Mike Cuellar; 25 Moe Drabowsky; 29 Dick Hall; 44 Jim Hardin; 40 Dave Leonhard; 32 Marcelino López; 19 Dave McNally; 22 Jim Palmer; 36 Tom Phoebus; 24 Pete Richert; 39 Eddie Watt	Catchers: 3 Clay Dalrymple; 8 Andy Etchebarren; 10 Elrod Hendricks; 12 Johnny Oates; Infielders: 7 Mark Belanger; 2 Bobby Floyd; 13 Roger Freed; 16 Bobby Grich; 15 Davey Johnson; 26 Boog Powell; 5 Brooks Robinson; 30 Chico Salmon	Outfielders: 23 Don Baylor; 6 Paul Blair; 9 Don Buford; 37 Terry Crowley; 12 Dave May; 21 Curt Motton; 14 Merv Rettenmund; 20 Frank Robinson	Manager: 4 Earl Weaver; Coaches: 31 George Bamberger; 41 Jim Frey; 55 Billy Hunter; 48 George Staller

== Player stats ==
= Indicates team leader

=== Batting ===
==== Starters by position ====
Note: Pos = Position; G = Games played; AB = At bats; H = Hits; Avg. = Batting average; HR = Home runs; RBI = Runs batted in

Pos	Player	G	AB	H	Avg.	HR	RBI
C	Elrod Hendricks	106	322	79	.242	12	41
1B	Boog Powell	154	527	156	.297	35	114
2B	Davey Johnson	149	530	149	.281	10	53
3B	Brooks Robinson	158	608	168	.276	18	94
SS	Mark Belanger	145	459	100	.218	1	36
LF	Don Buford	144	504	137	.272	17	66
CF	Paul Blair	133	480	128	.267	18	65
RF	Frank Robinson	132	471	144	.306	25	78

==== Other batters ====
Note: G = Games played; AB = At bats; H = Hits; Avg. = Batting average; HR = Home runs; RBI = Runs batted in

Player	G	AB	H	Avg.	HR	RBI
Merv Rettenmund	106	338	109	.322	18	58
Andy Etchebarren	78	230	56	.243	4	28
Chico Salmon	63	172	43	.250	7	22
Terry Crowley	83	152	39	.257	5	20
Bobby Grich	30	95	20	.211	0	8
Curt Motton	52	84	19	.226	3	19
Clay Dalrymple	13	32	7	.219	1	3
Dave May	25	31	6	.194	1	6
Johnny Oates	5	18	5	.278	0	2
Don Baylor	8	17	4	.235	0	4
Roger Freed	4	13	2	.154	0	1
Bobby Floyd	3	2	0	.000	0	0

=== Pitching ===
= Indicates league leader

==== Starting pitchers ====
Note: G = Games pitched; IP = Innings pitched; W = Wins; L = Losses; ERA = Earned run average; SO = Strikeouts

Player	G	IP	W	L	ERA	SO
Jim Palmer	39	305.0	20	10	2.71	199
Mike Cuellar	40	297.2	24*	8	3.48	190
Dave McNally	40	296.0	24*	9	3.22	185
Tom Phoebus	27	135.0	5	5	3.07	72

- Tied with Jim Perry (Minnesota) for league lead

==== Other pitchers ====
Note: G = Games pitched; IP = Innings pitched; W = Wins; L = Losses; ERA = Earned run average; SO = Strikeouts

Player	G	IP	W	L	ERA	SO
Jim Hardin	36	145.1	6	5	3.53	78

==== Relief pitchers ====
Note: G = Games pitched; W = Wins; L = Losses; SV = Saves; ERA = Earned run average; SO = Strikeouts

Player	G	W	L	SV	ERA	SO
Pete Richert	50	7	2	13	1.98	66
Eddie Watt	53	7	7	12	3.25	33
Dick Hall	32	10	5	3	3.08	30
Marcelino López	25	1	1	0	2.08	49
Dave Leonhard	23	0	0	1	5.08	14
Moe Drabowsky	21	4	2	1	3.78	21
Fred Beene	4	0	0	0	6.00	4

== Postseason ==
=== ALCS ===
The Orioles win the series over the Minnesota Twins in three straight games.

Game	Score	Date	Location	Attendance
1	Baltimore – 10, Minnesota – 6	October 3	Metropolitan Stadium	26,847
2	Baltimore – 11, Minnesota – 3	October 4	Metropolitan Stadium	27,490
3	Minnesota – 1, Baltimore – 6	October 5	Memorial Stadium	27,608

=== World Series ===
AL Baltimore Orioles (4) vs. NL Cincinnati Reds (1)

Game	Score	Date	Location	Attendance	Time of Game
1	Orioles – 4, Reds – 3	October 10	Riverfront Stadium	51,351	2:24
2	Orioles – 6, Reds – 5	October 11	Riverfront Stadium	51,351	2:26
3	Reds – 3, Orioles – 9	October 13	Memorial Stadium	51,773	2:09
4	Reds – 6, Orioles – 5	October 14	Memorial Stadium	53,007	2:26
5	Reds – 3, Orioles – 9	October 15	Memorial Stadium	45,341	2:35

== Awards and honors ==
- Boog Powell, American League MVP
- Brooks Robinson, Babe Ruth Award
- Brooks Robinson, World Series MVP

== Farm system ==
Level	Team	League	Manager
AAA	Rochester Red Wings	International League	Cal Ripken Sr.
AA	Dallas-Fort Worth Spurs	Texas League	Joe Altobelli
A	Stockton Ports	California League	Bill Werle
A	Miami Marlins	Florida State League	Woody Smith
A-Short Season	Aberdeen Pheasants	Northern League	Ken Rowe
Rookie	Bluefield Orioles	Appalachian League	Ray Malgradi

LEAGUE CHAMPIONS: Miami, Bluefield
