= 1970 Major League Baseball postseason =

1970 Major League Baseball playoffs

Tournament details
- Dates: October 3–15, 1970
- Teams: 4

Final positions
- Champions: Baltimore Orioles (2nd title)
- Runners-up: Cincinnati Reds

Tournament statistics
- Games played: 11
- Attendance: 448,071 (40,734 per game)
- Best BA: Brooks Robinson (BAL) (.485)
- Most HRs: Boog Powell & Frank Robinson (BAL) (3)
- Most SBs: Bobby Tolan (CIN) (2)
- Best ERA: Dave McNally (BAL) (3.00)
- Most Ks (as pitcher): Jim Palmer (BAL) (21)

Awards
- MVP: Brooks Robinson (BAL)

The 1970 Major League Baseball postseason was the playoff tournament of Major League Baseball for the 1970 season. The winners of each division advance to the postseason and face each other in a League Championship Series to determine the pennant winners that face each other in the World Series.

In the American League, the Baltimore Orioles and Minnesota Twins returned to the postseason for the second straight year. This was Minnesota’s last postseason appearance until 1987.

In the National League, the Cincinnati Reds made their first postseason appearance since 1961, and the Pittsburgh Pirates made their first appearance since 1960. Both the Pirates and Reds would make five more postseason appearances throughout the decade.

The playoffs began on October 3, 1970, and concluded on October 15, 1970, with the Baltimore Orioles defeating the Cincinnati Reds in five games in the 1970 World Series. It was the Orioles' second championship in franchise history.

== Umpires strike ==
The Major League Umpires Association went on strike for Game 1 of each league's championship series on October 3. The dispute was over the pay scale for the playoffs and World Series. The umpires demanded an increase from $2,500 to $5,000 for the playoffs and $6,500 to $10,000 for the Series. American and National League management offered $3,000 and $7,000. Both sides had been in negotiations since July.

Harry Wendelstedt, Nick Colosi, Stan Landes, Bob Engel, Paul Pryor and Doug Harvey were assigned to the NLCS but picketed in full uniform outside Three Rivers Stadium. Their American League counterparts Bill Haller, Jim Odom, Jerry Neudecker, Jim Honochick, Russ Goetz and Marty Springstead did not picket outside Metropolitan Stadium.

Both leagues employed four replacement umpires instead of six, with each being paid $3,000. Four Triple-A umpires worked the NLCS, with the American Association's John Grimsley and Fred Blandford at home plate and first base respectively and the International League's Hank Morgenweck and George Grygiel at second and third. The ALCS had retired umpires John Stevens and Charlie Berry at home plate and third, the Southern League's Bill Deegan at first and the International League's Donald Stachell at second.

The one-day strike ended when the union reached a temporary agreement to be paid at the scale offered by management which agreed to bargain in good faith. A key factor was the unionized Three Rivers Stadium employees' threat to force the postponement of NLCS Game 2 by refusing to cross the umpires' picket line.

== Teams ==
American League Teams National League Teams

The following teams qualified for the postseason:

=== American League ===
- Baltimore Orioles – 108–54, AL East champions
- Minnesota Twins – 98–64, AL West champions

=== National League ===
- Pittsburgh Pirates – 89–73, NL East champions
- Cincinnati Reds – 102–60, NL West champions

== Playoff bracket ==
League Championship Series (ALCS, NLCS)
East	Baltimore	3
West	Minnesota	0
East	Pittsburgh	0
West	Cincinnati	3

World Series
AL	Baltimore	4
NL	Cincinnati	1

== American League Championship Series ==
=== Minnesota Twins vs. Baltimore Orioles ===
Baltimore won the series, 3–0.

Game	Date	Score	Location	Time	Attendance
1	October 3	Baltimore Orioles – 10, Minnesota Twins – 6	Metropolitan Stadium	2:36	26,847
2	October 4	Baltimore Orioles – 11, Minnesota Twins – 3	Metropolitan Stadium	2:59	27,490
3	October 5	Minnesota Twins – 1, Baltimore Orioles – 6	Memorial Stadium	2:20	27,608

This was a rematch of the previous year's series, which the Orioles won in a 3–0 sweep. Once again, the Orioles would sweep the Twins and advance to the World Series for the second consecutive year.

This ALCS was even more lopsided than the previous year's, as the Twins were once again outmatched by the Orioles. Game 1 was an offensive slugfest that was won by the Orioles. Dave McNally pitched a complete game in Game 2 as the Orioles blew out the Twins to go up 2–0 in the series headed to Baltimore. Game 2 of this ALCS was also the last postseason game ever played at Metropolitan Stadium. Jim Palmer pitched yet another complete game for the Orioles in Game 3 as they won by a 6–1 score to secure the pennant.

The Orioles would sweep the Oakland Athletics the next year for their third straight pennant before falling in the World Series.

After the loss, the Twins entered a slump. They would eventually win the pennant again in 1987 over the Detroit Tigers in five games en route to a World Series title.

== National League Championship Series ==
=== Pittsburgh Pirates vs. Cincinnati Reds ===
Cincinnati won the series, 3–0.

Game	Date	Score	Location	Time	Attendance
1	October 3	Cincinnati Reds – 3, Pittsburgh Pirates – 0 (10)	Three Rivers Stadium	2:23	33,088
2	October 4	Cincinnati Reds – 3, Pittsburgh Pirates – 1	Three Rivers Stadium	2:10	39,317
3	October 5	Pittsburgh Pirates – 2, Cincinnati Reds – 3	Riverfront Stadium	2:38	40,538

This was the first postseason meeting in the history of the Pirates-Reds rivalry, and the first of eleven straight NLCS series to feature either the Reds, Pirates, or Philadelphia Phillies. The Reds swept the Pirates to advance to the World Series for the first time since 1961.

Gary Nolan pitched nine innings of shutout ball, and in the top of the tenth, RBIs from Lee May and Pete Rose in his postseason debut would secure a 3-0 Reds win on the road in Game 1. The Pirates' offense was neutered yet again in Game 2 as the Reds won thanks to a solo homer and RBI single from Bobby Tolan, taking a 2–0 series lead heading to Cincinnati. In the first postseason game at the then-brand new Riverfront Stadium, Tolan was once again the hero for the Reds as he had an RBI single in the bottom of the eighth that put Cincinnati in the lead for good, securing the pennant. This was the first playoff series win by the Reds since the 1940 World Series.

The Pirates would return to the NLCS the next year, and defeated the San Francisco Giants in four games en route to a World Series title.

This was the first of four NL pennants won by the Reds during the 1970s. They would defeat the Pirates for the pennant again in 1972, then sweep them in 1975, and in 1976 they swept the Philadelphia Phillies en route to repeating as World Series champions.

The Pirates and Reds would meet again in the NLCS in 1972, 1975, 1979, and 1990, and the Wild Card round in 2013, with the Pirates winning in 1979 and 2013, and the Reds winning in 1972, 1975, and 1990.

== 1970 World Series ==
=== Baltimore Orioles (AL) vs. Cincinnati Reds (NL) ===
Baltimore won the series, 4–1.

Game	Date	Score	Location	Time	Attendance
1	October 10	Baltimore Orioles – 4, Cincinnati Reds – 3	Riverfront Stadium	2:24	51,531
2	October 11	Baltimore Orioles – 6, Cincinnati Reds – 5	Riverfront Stadium	2:26	51,531
3	October 13	Cincinnati Reds – 3, Baltimore Orioles – 9	Memorial Stadium	2:09	51,773
4	October 14	Cincinnati Reds – 6, Baltimore Orioles – 5	Memorial Stadium	2:26	53,007
5	October 15	Cincinnati Reds – 3, Baltimore Orioles – 9	Memorial Stadium	2:35	45,341

The Orioles defeated the Reds in five games to win their second World Series title in franchise history.

The Orioles stole Game 1 on the road in Cincinnati, as Brooks Robinson hit a solo home run in the top of the seventh to give the O's a 4–3 victory. Game 1 was marred by controversy during the sixth inning – The Reds had Bernie Carbo on third and Tommy Helms on first when Ty Cline, batting for Woody Woodward, hit a high chopper in front of the plate. Home plate umpire Ken Burkhart positioned himself in front of the plate to call the ball fair or foul as Carbo sped home. Baltimore catcher Elrod Hendricks fielded the ball and turned to tag Carbo with Burkhart blocking the way. Hendricks tagged the sliding Carbo with his glove hand while holding the ball in his bare right hand, and Burkhart was knocked to the ground as he had his back to the play. When Burkhart turned around, he saw Carbo out of the baseline because Burkhart was actually blocking Carbo's direct path to the plate as Hendricks held the ball. Burkhart signaled Carbo out without asking for help from the other umpires. Replays showed that Hendricks tagged Carbo with an empty mitt, but Carbo also missed the plate on the slide, although he stood on it when he argued the "out" call. Both Carbo and Sparky Anderson vehemently argued the call, to no avail.

In Game 2, the Reds jumped out to an early 4–0 lead after the first three innings, however the Orioles went on a 6–1 run through the next three innings to win by one run and go up 2–0 in the series headed to Baltimore. Dave McNally had yet another postseason complete game performance in Game 3 as the Orioles blew out the Reds to take a commanding three games to none series lead. In Game 4, with the Orioles six outs away from a World Series sweep, Lee May hit a three-run homer to put the Reds in the lead for good as they forced a fifth game, but it wasn’t enough. Mike Cuellar pitched another complete game for the Orioles as they blew out the Reds again to clinch the championship in Game 5. The Orioles were the last team to win the World Series in five games after failing to complete the sweep in Game 4 until the Los Angeles Dodgers did so in 2024.

After the World Series win by the Orioles, the NFL's Baltimore Colts went on to win Super Bowl V the next year, giving Baltimore both World Series and Super Bowl champions within the span of a year. The Orioles returned to the World Series the next year, as well as in 1979, but were defeated by the Pittsburgh Pirates in seven games both times. The Orioles would win their next and most recent championship in 1983 over the Philadelphia Phillies in five games. As of 2026, this is the last time the Orioles won the World Series at home.

The Reds returned to the World Series two years later, but fell to the Oakland Athletics in seven games, becoming the first victim of an Athletics three-peat from 1972 to 1974. They would eventually win their next title in 1975 against the Boston Red Sox in seven games after being seven outs away from elimination in Game 7.

== Broadcasting ==
NBC televised all postseason games nationally in the United States. Each team's local broadcaster also televised coverage of LCS games.
