= 1966 World Series =

63rd edition of Major League Baseball's championship series

Team (Wins)	Managers	Season
Baltimore Orioles (4)	Hank Bauer	97–63, .606, GA: 9
Los Angeles Dodgers (0)	Walter Alston	95–67, .586, GA: 1 1/2
- Dates: October 5–9
- Venue(s): Dodger Stadium (Los Angeles); Memorial Stadium (Baltimore)
- MVP: Frank Robinson (Baltimore)
- Umpires: Bill Jackowski (NL), Nestor Chylak (AL), Chris Pelekoudas (NL), Johnny Rice (AL), Mel Steiner (NL), Cal Drummond (AL)
- Hall of Famers: Umpire: Nestor Chylak; Orioles: Luis Aparicio; Jim Palmer; Brooks Robinson; Frank Robinson; Dodgers: Walt Alston (manager); Don Drysdale; Sandy Koufax

Broadcast
- Television: NBC
- TV announcers: Curt Gowdy; Vin Scully (in Los Angeles); Chuck Thompson (in Baltimore)
- Radio: NBC
- Radio announcers: Bob Prince; Chuck Thompson (in Los Angeles); Vin Scully (in Baltimore)

The 1966 World Series was the championship series of Major League Baseball's (MLB) 1966 season. The 63rd edition of the World Series, it was a best-of-seven playoff between the American League (AL) champion Baltimore Orioles and National League (NL) champion (and defending World Series champion) Los Angeles Dodgers. The Orioles swept the series in four games to capture their first championship in franchise history. It was the last World Series played before MLB introduced the Commissioner's Trophy the following year. The Dodgers suffered record low scoring, accumulating just two runs over the course of the series (both of which were in the first game), the lowest number of runs ever scored by any team in a World Series.

== Background ==
Despite the general consensus that the Orioles were short of pitching compared to the Dodgers and their star hurlers Don Drysdale and Sandy Koufax, Baltimore pitching allowed only two runs in the entire series and ended up with a 0.50 team earned run average (ERA), the second-lowest in World Series history. The Orioles scored more runs in the first inning of the first game than the Dodgers would score in the whole series.

The Orioles got a substantial assist from long-time scout Jim Russo, who spent the first two weeks of September following the Dodgers as they won 12 of 14 games. One of the observations in his 16-page scouting report was that Dodger batters had trouble with the fastball against Gaylord Perry and Larry Dierker. Other points included Maury Wills being the lone bunt threat; left-handed pitchers forcing switch hitters to bat right-handed and Ron Fairly out of the lineup, both to the detriment of the Dodgers; and that Orioles batters should avoid swinging at Koufax's rising fastball above the strike zone. Frank Robinson also added suggestions based on his experiences in the National League when the team went over the scouting report a day prior to the start of the Series.

Boog Powell from the Orioles and Jim Barbieri from the Dodgers were the first players to play in the Little League World Series and the World Series. Each played against the other in Game 1 of the 1954 Little League World Series. Barbieri pinch-hit for Dodger relief pitcher Joe Moeller in Game 1 of the series. Barbieri struck out in what would be the final appearance of his brief career.

== Route to the World Series ==
=== Orioles ===
After the 1965 season that saw the Orioles finish in third place, they acquired Hall of Famer Frank Robinson from the Cincinnati Reds in exchange for starting pitcher Milt Pappas. Robinson won the Triple Crown and A.L. MVP honors in leading the Orioles to the A.L. pennant by nine games over the Minnesota Twins.

=== Dodgers ===
The Dodgers were in a tight pennant race for the fourth time in five years. Going into a season ending double header in Philadelphia, the Dodgers led the San Francisco Giants by two games. The Giants were in Pittsburgh for a single game, and if they won that game and the Dodgers lost twice, the Giants would have headed to Cincinnati to play a make up game of an earlier rain-out; a win there would force a tie for first place.

In the first game of the double header, the Dodgers made two errors in the bottom of the eighth inning to turn a 3–2 win into a 4–3 loss. Meanwhile, in Pittsburgh, the Giants kept their slim hopes alive by getting a run in the ninth to tie, and four in the 11th to win, 7–3. The Dodgers needed to win the second game of the doubleheader. Sandy Koufax pitched the Dodgers to a 6–3 win to clinch the pennant (this appearance, which turned out to be Koufax' last in a regular season game, caused him not to be available for Game 1 of the World Series).

== Summary ==
AL Baltimore Orioles (4) vs. NL Los Angeles Dodgers (0)

Game	Date	Score	Location	Time	Attendance
1	October 5	Baltimore Orioles – 5, Los Angeles Dodgers – 2	Dodger Stadium	2:56	55,941
2	October 6	Baltimore Orioles – 6, Los Angeles Dodgers – 0	Dodger Stadium	2:26	55,947
3	October 8	Los Angeles Dodgers – 0, Baltimore Orioles – 1	Memorial Stadium	1:55	54,445
4	October 9	Los Angeles Dodgers – 0, Baltimore Orioles – 1	Memorial Stadium	1:45	54,458

== Matchups ==
=== Game 1 ===
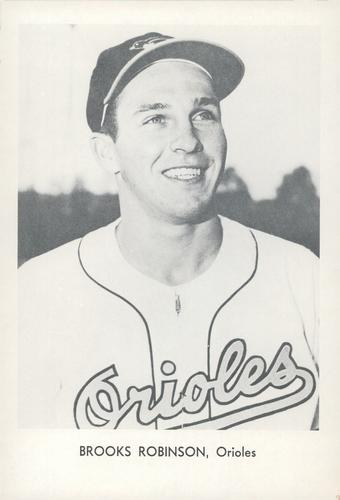
Brooks Robinson

Wednesday, October 5, 1966 1:00 pm (PT) at Dodger Stadium in Los Angeles, California
Team	1	2	3	4	5	6	7	8	9	R	H	E
Baltimore	3	1	0	1	0	0	0	0	0	5	9	0
Los Angeles	0	1	1	0	0	0	0	0	0	2	3	0
WP: Moe Drabowsky (1–0) LP: Don Drysdale (0–1); Home runs: BAL: Frank Robinson (1), Brooks Robinson (1); LAD: Jim Lefebvre (1)

In the top of the first inning, after Russ Snyder drew a one-out walk, Frank Robinson and Brooks Robinson hit back-to-back home runs off of Don Drysdale to give the Orioles an early 3–0 lead. In the bottom half of the frame, Dave McNally walked Dodger leadoff man Maury Wills, who subsequently stole second. However, the Dodgers failed to score. In the second inning, Andy Etchebarren drew a leadoff walk, advanced to second on a sacrifice bunt by McNally, and scored on a single by Snyder to widen the lead to 4–0.

However, McNally soon began to struggle with his command. In the bottom of the second inning, second baseman Jim Lefebvre hit a long home run to make it 4-1. First baseman Wes Parker then hit a fair ball down the right-field foul line, but a fan reached over the wall and picked the ball out of the dirt, turning a possible triple into a fan interference double. After McNally walked Jim Gilliam, John Roseboro hit a fly ball to right center, but Snyder saved at least a run with a lunging catch, and Baltimore escaped the inning without further damage.

McNally wouldn't last much longer, though, as he was taken out with one out in the bottom of the third inning after loading the bases on walks. Moe Drabowsky entered the game and struck out Parker, but then walked Gilliam, forcing in a run and making it 4-2. Drabowsky, however, got out of the jam when Roseboro popped out to Etchebarren in foul territory. This third-inning run would be the Dodgers' last run of 1966.

From there, the Orioles controlled the rest of the game. They added an insurance run in the fourth inning against Joe Moeller (who replaced Drysdale in the third inning), when Davey Johnson scored from second on a fielder's choice by Luis Aparicio. Meanwhile, Drabowsky struck out six consecutive batters in the next two innings, tying Hod Eller's record from Game 5 of the 1919 World Series. Drabowsky's total of 11 strikeouts in 6 2/3 innings of relief are a record for a relief pitcher in a World Series game. The Orioles won 5–2, and the Dodgers would not get another runner across the plate in the series.

=== Game 2 ===
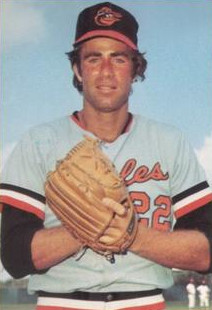
Jim Palmer

Thursday, October 6, 1966 1:00 pm (PT) at Dodger Stadium in Los Angeles, California
Team	1	2	3	4	5	6	7	8	9	R	H	E
Baltimore	0	0	0	0	3	1	0	2	0	6	8	0
Los Angeles	0	0	0	0	0	0	0	0	0	0	4	6
WP: Jim Palmer (1–0) LP: Sandy Koufax (0–1)

Game 2 was a matchup between two future Hall of Famers, one whose career was just beginning and the other making his final appearance. The Dodgers started left-handed ace Sandy Koufax, who was pitching in his last season but had won his third Cy Young Award in four years with 27 wins, 317 strikeouts, 5 shutouts, and his career best 1.73 ERA. The Orioles countered with 20-year-old Jim Palmer, who won 15 games with a 3.46 ERA in his first season in the starting rotation.

Despite the difference in experience, Palmer and Koufax traded zeroes on the scoreboard for four innings. Palmer got into trouble in the second inning when a double by Lou Johnson put runners on second and third with one out, but he got out of the jam by getting Roseboro to pop out to shortstop Aparicio, and then intentionally walking Parker to face Koufax, who popped out to second base. Surprisingly, Baltimore drew first blood against Koufax, although they were assisted by disastrous defense by Los Angeles center fielder Willie Davis.

Boog Powell led off with a single to left. Paul Blair then hit a routine fly ball to center, but Davis lost the ball in the sun and dropped it for an error, putting two runners on with one out. Etchebarren then hit another fly to center, but Davis, again battling the sun, bobbled the ball and then dropped it for another error. Powell scored on the misplay, while Blair attempted to advance to third base; Davis subsequently released a high, rushed throw over the head of third baseman Gilliam. The throwing error - Davis' third of the inning, a World Series record that still stands - allowed Blair to score and Etchebarren to advance to third. Aparicio then cracked a stand-up double to drive in Etchebarren. All three runs were unearned.

The O's then earned one from Koufax in the sixth as Frank Robinson hit a triple on a fly ball that could have been caught but fell in between Davis and Ron Fairly. Powell drove him in with a single to right-center. Johnson followed with a single to right, and the runners advanced on an error by Fairly. Koufax escaped the inning after walking Blair intentionally to load the bases and getting Etchebarren to ground into a double play. Etchebarren would be the final batter that Koufax ever faced in his career.

Koufax was replaced in the seventh by Ron Perranoski, who set the Orioles down in order. They would get two from him in the eighth, however, on a walk to Frank Robinson, a single by Brooks Robinson, a sacrifice bunt from Powell and a Johnson single off of Perranoski's glove. Perranoski threw the ball away in an attempt for an out at first, and Brooks scored on the error.

Meanwhile, Palmer was brilliant after escaping the second inning, allowing only one runner to reach second base in the final seven frames. He completed the shutout when Roseboro popped out to Aparicio, the Orioles' shortstop; Palmer, just nine days shy of his 21st birthday, became the youngest pitcher in World Series and MLB postseason history to throw a shutout, a record that still stands. Baltimore won 6–0 to take a 2–0 Series lead.

The Dodgers became the third team to make six errors in one game. The Chicago White Sox, both in Game 5 of the 1906 World Series and in Game 5 of the 1917 World Series were the others, although oddly, the White Sox won both of those games.

=== Game 3 ===
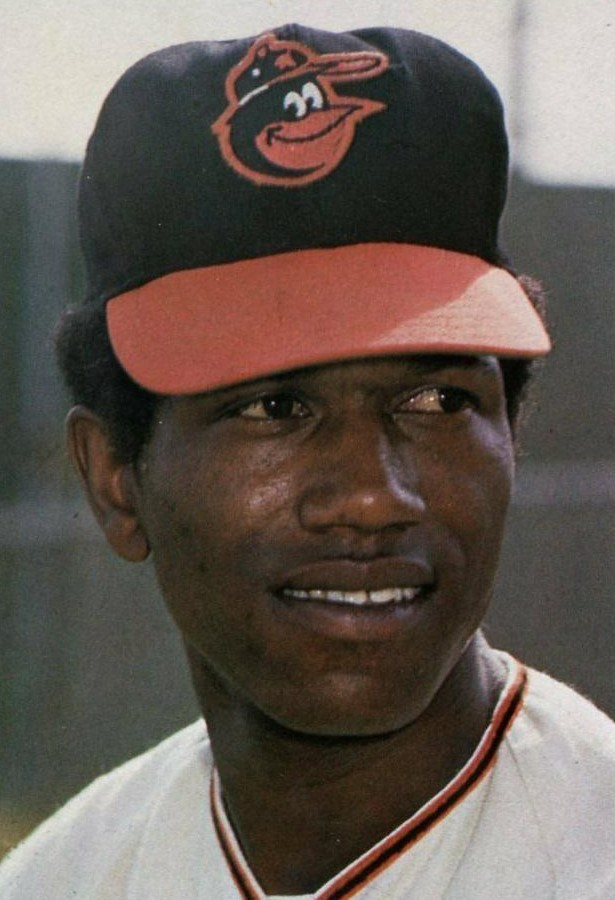
Paul Blair

Saturday, October 8, 1966 1:00 pm (ET) at Memorial Stadium in Baltimore, Maryland
Team	1	2	3	4	5	6	7	8	9	R	H	E
Los Angeles	0	0	0	0	0	0	0	0	0	0	6	0
Baltimore	0	0	0	0	1	0	0	0	X	1	3	0
WP: Wally Bunker (1–0) LP: Claude Osteen (0–1); Home runs: LAD: None; BAL: Paul Blair (1)

With the Orioles ahead in the series 2-0, the scene shifted to Baltimore's Memorial Stadium for Game 3, the first postseason game the city has hosted in the modern era of baseball. Wally Bunker of the Orioles faced Claude Osteen of the Dodgers.

Bunker, plagued with injuries in the regular season, pitched the game of his life, scattering six hits in a complete game gem. Although Osteen allowed only three hits in seven strong innings, one of those hits was a solo home run from Paul Blair in the fifth, which turned out to be the game's only run. The Dodgers' defense woke up after Game 2's six-error embarrassment, and they turned several excellent plays, most notably first baseman Wes Parker's spectacular jump to snare Curt Blefary's sixth inning line drive and rob him of a base hit. Nonetheless, Bunker, without a shutout in the regular season, completed the Orioles' second consecutive shutout in this World Series by retiring Lou Johnson on a grounder to Aparicio. The 1–0 win gave the Orioles a commanding 3–0 series lead, putting them on the cusp of their first title.

=== Game 4 ===
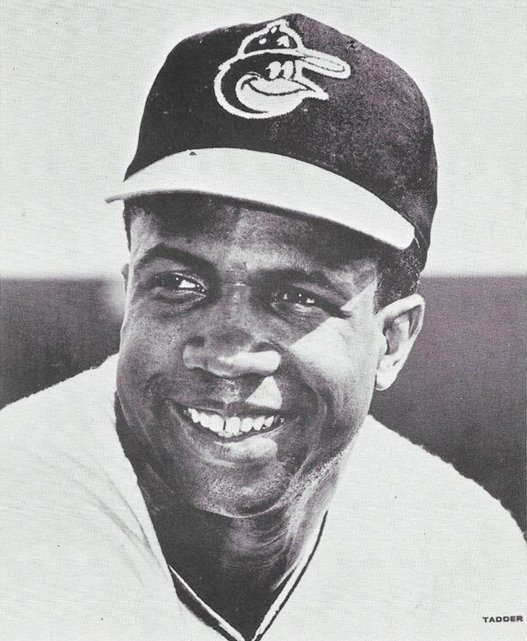
Frank Robinson scored the only run in the decisive Game 4, doing so on a home run in the fourth inning before being named World Series MVP.

Sunday, October 9, 1966 2:00 pm (ET) at Memorial Stadium in Baltimore, Maryland
Team	1	2	3	4	5	6	7	8	9	R	H	E
Los Angeles	0	0	0	0	0	0	0	0	0	0	4	0
Baltimore	0	0	0	1	0	0	0	0	X	1	4	0
WP: Dave McNally (1–0) LP: Don Drysdale (0–2); Home runs: LAD: None; BAL: Frank Robinson (2)

Game 4 was a rematch of Game 1, pitting the young pitcher Dave McNally against the veteran Don Drysdale, both of whom had struggled in their previous match-up. However, in this outing, both pitchers excelled as Drysdale and McNally each allowed only four hits. Again, the only run scored was on a home run, this one by Frank Robinson. Willie Davis redeemed himself from his miserable Game 2 defensive blunders by robbing Boog Powell of a home run in the fourth, but to no avail as Paul Blair did the same to Jim Lefebvre in the eighth, and the Dodgers were shut out for the third consecutive time and for 33 consecutive innings, a World Series record. With the 1–0 Game 4 victory, the Orioles swept the series and won their first World Series championship in franchise history.

The Orioles became the first American League team other than the Yankees to win the World Series since the 1948 Cleveland Indians. The Orioles also became the last of the original eight American League teams to win their first World Series title. The Orioles had played in the Fall Classic as the St. Louis Browns in the 1944 World Series, in which they were the last original AL team, and the last of the 16 teams that made up the major leagues from 1903 to 1960, to achieve participation in a World Series. They were also the second-to-last "Original 16" MLB team to win a World Series; the 1980 Philadelphia Phillies became the last team to do so 14 years later.

Ironically, despite the historic dominance of Baltimore's starting rotation throughout the series, outfielder Frank Robinson was named World Series MVP. He became the first position player from a winning World Series team to win World Series MVP honors. (Bobby Richardson was the first position player to win the award, doing so in the 1960 World Series, but his New York Yankees lost to the Pittsburgh Pirates.)

The Orioles became the second team in World Series history (the 1937 New York Yankees were the first), not to commit an error in a series of any length, handling 141 total chances (108 putouts, 33 assists).

As of 2026, this is the only time that the Dodgers have ever been swept in a World Series. This was the only time the Dodgers were swept in a best-of-seven series until the 2026 National League Championship Series. Game 4 was the shortest World Series contest since Game 4 of the 1948 series, as well as last Fall Classic game to date to be played in under two hours.

== Composite box ==
1966 World Series (4–0): Baltimore Orioles (A.L.) over Los Angeles Dodgers (N.L.)

Team	1	2	3	4	5	6	7	8	9	R	H	E
Baltimore Orioles	3	1	0	2	4	1	0	2	0	13	24	0
Los Angeles Dodgers	0	1	1	0	0	0	0	0	0	2	17	6
Total attendance: 220,791 Average attendance: 55,198; Winning player's share: $11,683 Losing player's share: $8,189

== Broadcasting ==
NBC broadcast the series on both television and radio. In prior years, the local announcers for both the home and away teams had split calling the play-by-play for the telecast of each World Series game; however, beginning this year and continuing through 1976, only the home-team announcer would do TV for each game, splitting play-by-play and color commentary with a neutral NBC announcer, while the visiting-team announcer would help call the radio broadcast. Thus, in 1966 NBC's Curt Gowdy (completing his first season as the network's lead baseball voice) worked the telecasts with the Dodgers' Vin Scully for the games in Los Angeles and with the Orioles' Chuck Thompson for the games in Baltimore. Bob Prince, in turn, worked the radio broadcasts with Thompson (in Los Angeles) and Scully (in Baltimore). The Nielsen ratings were as follows: Game 1 (23.3), Game 2 (22.8), Game 3 (23.1), and Game 4 (33.4)

== Aftermath ==
This was the last hurrah for the Dodgers of this era. In an eight-year span from 1959 to 1966, they played in four World Series, winning three of them. In addition, they finished second twice (once losing in a playoff) and fourth once. Sandy Koufax, though arguably at the peak of his career, announced his retirement following the World Series because of the chronic arthritis and bursitis in his pitching elbow. In addition, shortstop and 1962 Most Valuable Player Maury Wills was traded to the Pittsburgh Pirates in December. Tommy Davis, the 1962 and 1963 NL batting champion, still not fully recovered from a severely broken ankle suffered in 1965, was traded to the New York Mets after the 1966 season. Finally, third baseman/utility man Jim Gilliam announced his retirement. The Dodgers still had decent pitching, but their offense was among the worst in the majors. They finished in eighth place in 1967 and in seventh in 1968, before a new group of young players led the team back into contention in 1969. The Dodgers would return to the World Series in 1974, but lost in five games to the Oakland Athletics, becoming the last victim of an Athletics three-peat from 1972 to 1974. They also returned to the Fall Classic in 1977 and 1978, but lost both to their archrival in the New York Yankees in six games. They would eventually win their next championship in 1981 over the Yankees in six games.

Meanwhile, Baltimore became the dominant American League team in the late 1960s and most of the 1970s, making the postseason in 1969, 1970, 1971, 1973, 1974, and 1979. Injuries slowed the team down in 1967, and they finished second to the eventual World Series champion in the 103-win Detroit Tigers in 1968. They would reach the World Series three straight times afterward. Their first was in 1969, where they were shockingly upset by the New York Mets in five games. Then, they returned the following year, and defeated the Cincinnati Reds in five games for their second championship. After that, they returned in 1971, but blew a two-games-to-none series lead and lost to the Pittsburgh Pirates in seven games.

Orioles' second baseman Davey Johnson later briefly managed the Dodgers from 1999–2000.

The Dodgers would not successfully defend their championship from a previous until 2025, when they defeated the Toronto Blue Jays in seven games after being two outs away from elimination in Game 7. Coincidentally, the Dodgers posted the worst batting average for a champion since the 1966 Orioles team that denied their quest of back-to-back championships 59 years earlier.

== Record-low scoring ==
The 1966 series featured exceptionally low numbers of runs for all concerned, separately and jointly, and also set multiple records for other metrics related to low scoring.

- The series-losing Dodgers scored just 2 runs the entire series, the lowest number of runs ever scored by one team in a World Series, a record unique to 1966. The Orioles were far from productive themselves; scoring only 13 runs, they joined with the Dodgers to log the lowest combined number of runs, 15, ever scored by both teams in a World Series, another record unique to 1966.
- As for series-winning teams, just four other teams have managed to win a World Series while scoring fewer runs than the 1966 Orioles: The 1915 Boston Red Sox and 1963 Los Angeles Dodgers (12 runs each), the 1950 New York Yankees (11 runs), and the unique record holder for fewest runs scored in a World Series by the series winner, the 1918 Boston Red Sox (9 runs).
- Contributing to the series' low run count, Games 3 and 4 were both 1–0 games. The only other World Series to contain multiple 1–0 games was 1949.
- The Orioles shut the Dodgers out for a World Series record 33 consecutive innings – from the fourth inning of Game 1 to the end of the series (Game 4).
- Baltimore's pitching staff only allowed two earned runs and finished with a team ERA of 0.50, allowing a 4-game series low 17 hits and limiting the Dodgers to a team batting average of .142, the lowest team average in a series of any length. This topped the World Series team ERA mark of 1.00 set by the 1963 Dodgers in their 4-game sweep of the Yankees, and is second only to the unbreakable record team ERA of 0.00 set in 1905 by the New York Giants.
- The Orioles produced only 10 earned runs, including only 2 over the final 2 games. Their team batting average for the series was .200. Both teams combined to hit only .171, lowest in World Series history, and both teams combined for only 41 hits, lowest ever for a 4-game series.
- The Orioles scored more runs (3) in the first inning of Game 1 than the Dodgers did the whole series (2).

Top American League World Series pitching staffs through 1966:

Rank	A.L. Teams	ERA	Year
1	Baltimore Orioles	0.50	1966
2	Cleveland Indians	0.89	1920
3	New York Yankees	1.22	1939
4	Philadelphia Athletics	1.29	1911
5	Philadelphia Athletics	1.47	1905
	Boston Red Sox	1.47	1916
7	Chicago White Sox	1.50	1906
8	Boston Red Sox	1.70	1918
9	Philadelphia Athletics	1.73	1930
10	New York Yankees	1.80	1941

== See also ==
- 1966 Japan Series
- List of World Series sweeps
