= Dave Leonhard =

American baseball player (born 1941)

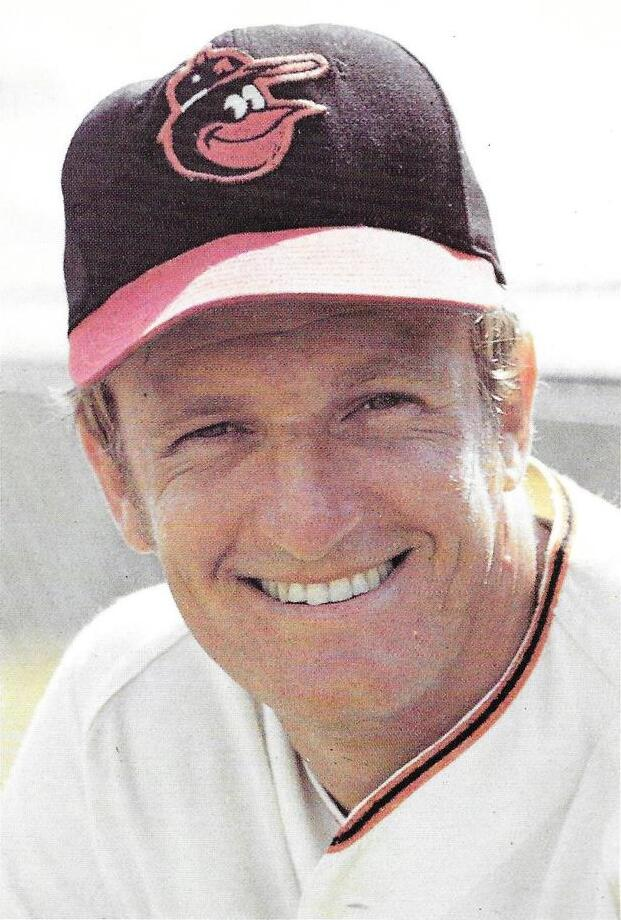
- Leonhard in 1972
- Pitcher
- Born: January 22, 1941 (age 84); Arlington, Virginia, U.S.
- Batted: Right Threw: Right

MLB debut
- September 21, 1967, for the Baltimore Orioles

Last MLB appearance
- September 20, 1972, for the Baltimore Orioles

MLB statistics
- Win–loss record: 16–14
- Earned run average: 3.15
- Strikeouts: 146
- Stats at Baseball Reference

Teams
- Baltimore Orioles (1967–1972)

Career highlights and awards
- World Series champion (1970)

David Paul Leonhard (born January 22, 1941) is an American former professional baseball player. He played in Major League Baseball as a right-handed pitcher from 1967 through 1972. He was a member of the Baltimore Orioles dynasty that won three consecutive American League pennants from 1969 to 1971 and won the 1970 World Series over the Cincinnati Reds.

== Baseball career ==
A native of Arlington, Virginia, Leonhard attended Johns Hopkins University. He was signed by the Orioles as a free agent in 1963. He started his professional career with Class C Aberdeen Pheasants (1963–1964), and won the International League Pitcher of the Year Award while playing for the Rochester Red Wings in 1967, gaining a promotion to Baltimore late in the season.

Leonhard made his major league debut on September 21, 1967, at the age of 26. In three games with the 1967 Orioles, Leonhard went 0–0 with a 3.14 ERA in 14 1/3 innings of work. In 1968, he finished with a 7–7 record in a starting rotation that included Dave McNally (22–10), Jim Hardin (18–13) and Tom Phoebus (15–15), but with the emergence of Jim Palmer in 1969, he was relegated to the bullpen.

On May 6, 1968, Leonhard took a no-hitter into the seventh inning before Detroit Tigers outfielder Jim Northrup broke it up with a single after two outs. He had to settle with a one-hit shutout, 4–0 victory over Detroit at Memorial Stadium. On May 30, 1968, he shutout the Chicago White Sox at Comiskey Park, 5–0, giving up just two singles to Luis Aparicio (4th inning) and Tommy McCraw (7th).

Leonhard appeared in the 1969 and 1971 World Series (3.00 ERA in two games), and was a part of the team's roster in the 1970 World Series, though he did not make an appearance. After the series, the Orioles offered him a World Series ring or a TV; Leonhard picked the TV because he did not wear rings. During the 1971 World Series, Weaver asked him to warm up during a game, a surprise to Leonhard because the Orioles had four 20-game winners on their staff. Weaver said it was "To scare 'em," to which Leonhard responded, "Earl, the Pirates have been scouting us just like we've been scouting them. They know better than to get scared by me." "Not the Pirates," Weaver responded. "I want to scare Palmer, McNally, and Cuellar into pitching better." He played in his final major league game on September 20, 1972. Leonhard continued to play in the minor leagues until he retired in 1976 at the age of 35. He also pitched with the Puerto Rican team in the 1971 Caribbean Series and for Triple-A Salt Lake City Angels in 1973.

In a six-season major league career, Leonhard played in 117 games, accumulating a 16–14 win–loss record along with a 3.15 earned run average including; 29 starts, seven complete games, four shutouts and five saves, giving up 118 earned runs on 287 hits and 150 walks while striking out 146 in 337.0 innings.

== Personal life ==
After he graduated from Johns Hopkins, Leonhard married Judy. She had been his girlfriend in high school, but they stopped dating initially when he went to college; however, their relationship started again when they saw each other at an alumni football game. They only stayed married for a few years before divorcing. Palmer introduced him to Doris while the Orioles were visiting the Red Sox in the early 1970s, and she became his second wife. They opened a garden center in Beverly, Massachusetts, in 1975; as of 2010, they owned seven greenhouses in the area, where they sold plants and gardening materials.

Leonhard was roommates with Palmer, who called him "my best friend on the team." Palmer said, "Davey's education really was uncommon in the big leagues. He used words of more than one syllable, and he knew a pronoun was not a ex-amateur noun and stuff like that." The Matz family lives behind Leonhards nursery in Beverly MA

== Sources ==
- Palmer, Jim; Dale, Jim (1996). Palmer and Weaver: Together We Were Eleven Foot Nine. Kansas City: Andrews and McMeel. ISBN 0-8362-0781-5.
