= Marcelino López =

Cuban baseball player (1943–2001)

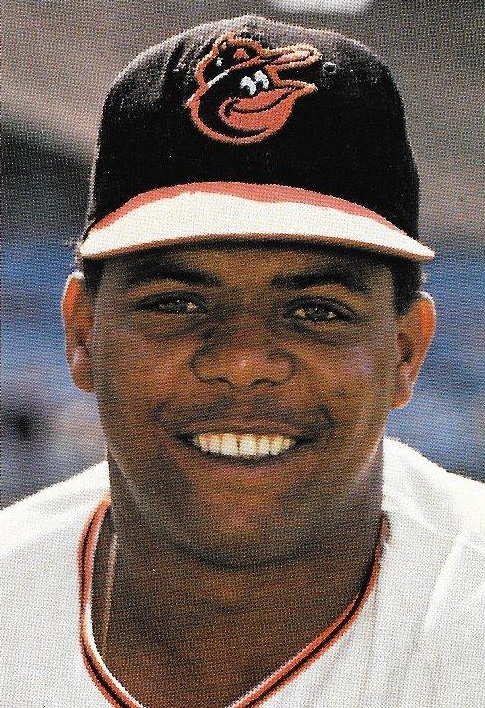
- Pitcher
- Born: September 23, 1943; Havana, Cuba
- Died: November 29, 2001 (aged 58); Hialeah, Florida, U.S.
- Batted: Right Threw: Left

MLB debut
- April 14, 1963, for the Philadelphia Phillies

Last MLB appearance
- September 24, 1972, for the Cleveland Indians

MLB statistics
- Win–loss record: 31–40
- Earned run average: 3.62
- Strikeouts: 426
- Stats at Baseball Reference

Teams
- Philadelphia Phillies (1963); Los Angeles/California Angels (1965–1967); Baltimore Orioles (1967–1970); Milwaukee Brewers (1971); Cleveland Indians (1972)

Career highlights and awards
- World Series champion (1970)

Marcelino Pons López (September 23, 1943 – November 29, 2001) was a Cuban professional baseball player. He played in Major League Baseball as a left-handed pitcher in 1963 and from 1965 through 1972, most notably as a member of the Baltimore Orioles dynasty that won two American League pennants and one World Series championship. He also played for the Milwaukee Brewers and the Cleveland Indians.

== Early years ==
López signed as an amateur free agent with the Philadelphia Phillies at just sixteen years old. He made his major league debut in 1963, but after just four appearances, was back in the minors by the end of April. He spent all of the 1964 season with Philadelphia's Triple-A affiliate, the Chattanooga Lookouts. After the Phillies acquired first baseman Vic Power from the Los Angeles Angels (September 9, 1964), López was selected as the “player to be named later,” the following month.

== California Angels ==
In 1965, López went 14–13 with a 2.93 earned run average and 122 strikeouts for the Angels to finish second to Curt Blefary in American League rookie of the year balloting.

His numbers fell off considerably in 1966, largely because he led AL starters in hit batsmen with nine, and was second in the league with twelve wild pitches (the Chicago White Sox's Joe Horlen had 14). Shoulder injuries limited López to just nine innings for the Angels in 1967. On June 15, he and minor leaguer Tom Arruda were sent to the Baltimore Orioles for Woodie Held.

== Baltimore Orioles ==
López spent all of 1968 in the minors before making his first major league appearance with the Orioles in 1969. At this point in his career, he was converted into a reliever, and was 4–2 with a 4.06 ERA out of the bullpen (he was 1–1 with a 5.40 ERA in his four starts).

The Orioles ran away with the American League East by nineteen games over the Detroit Tigers. López's only appearance in the 1969 American League Championship Series came in game one. In the twelfth inning, he faced four batters, retiring only one before manager Earl Weaver removed him in favor of Dick Hall. He did not make an appearance in the 1969 World Series against the New York Mets.

López became one of the most reliable relievers in Baltimore's bullpen in 1970, as he had a 1.65 ERA in relief. He was 1–0 with a 3.18 ERA as a starter. Baltimore returned to the post-season, and again, López made just one appearance. In the second game of the 1970 World Series, he faced just one batter, Bobby Tolan, and got him to fly out to Brooks Robinson in foul territory.

== Milwaukee Brewers ==
During spring training the following season, López was traded to the Milwaukee Brewers for Roric Harrison and minor leaguer Marion Jackson. He began the 1971 season as a reliever, but was added to the starting rotation midway through the season. He had a 1–5 record as a starter.

== Retirement ==
López's contract was purchased by the Cleveland Indians during spring training 1972. After spending the entire season with Cleveland's Triple-A affiliate, the Portland Beavers, López made four appearances with the Indians that September. He played minor league ball for the San Diego Padres, Pittsburgh Pirates and Houston Astros before retiring. He died in 2001 at age 58.
