= Tom Phoebus =

American baseball player (1942–2019)

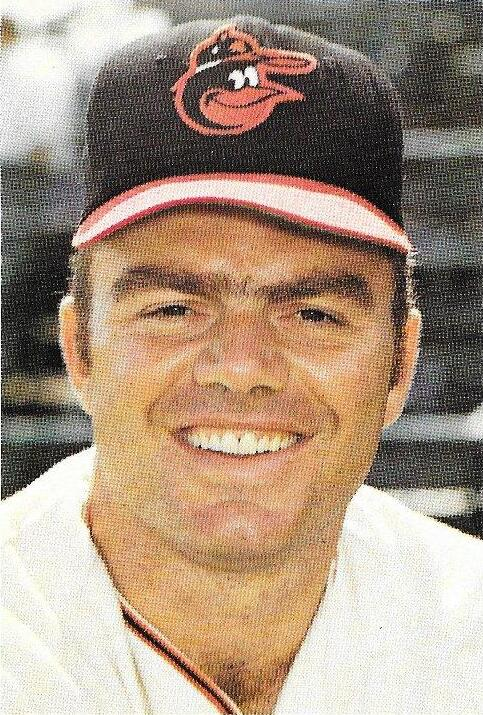
- Phoebus in 1970
- Pitcher
- Born: April 7, 1942; Baltimore, Maryland, U.S.
- Died: September 5, 2019 (aged 77); Palm City, Florida, U.S.
- Batted: Right Threw: Right

MLB debut
- September 15, 1966, for the Baltimore Orioles

Last MLB appearance
- October 2, 1972, for the Chicago Cubs

MLB statistics
- Win–loss record: 56–52
- Earned run average: 3.33
- Strikeouts: 725
- Stats at Baseball Reference

Teams
- Baltimore Orioles (1966–1970); San Diego Padres (1971–1972); Chicago Cubs (1972)

Career highlights and awards
- World Series champion (1970); Pitched no-hitter on April 27, 1968

Thomas Harold Stephen Phoebus (April 7, 1942 – September 5, 2019) was an American professional baseball player. He played in Major League Baseball as a right-handed pitcher from 1966 through 1972, most notably as a member of the Baltimore Orioles dynasty that won three American League pennants and two World Series championships between 1966 and 1970. He also played for the San Diego Padres and the Chicago Cubs.

== Education ==
Phoebus attended high school at Mount Saint Joseph College, a private high school in Baltimore. As a boy, he played baseball in Baltimore through the Mary Dobkin Athletic Clubs, as well as playing baseball and football in high school. He also went to Orioles games in the 1950s, sitting in the right field bleachers of Baltimore's old Memorial Stadium and dreaming of one day playing for the hometown team, he told a Baltimore Sun reporter in an interview almost a half-century later after signing with the Orioles in 1960 for a $10,000 bonus.

== Professional career ==
In minor league baseball, Phoebus led the Florida State League with 12 losses while playing for the Leesburg Orioles in 1961. In 1962, he was tops in the Northern League, with 195 strikeouts and 152 bases on balls while playing for the Aberdeen Pheasants. The next season, Phoebus led the Eastern League with 124 bases on balls while playing for the Elmira Pioneers. The minor leaguer's pitch count performance continued to be impressive in 1964, again leading the International League with 120 bases on balls while playing for the Rochester Red Wings. In 1966, Phoebus' walks were down and his Ks were still high, but he still managed to get the league lead in the International League with 208 strikeouts and 95 bases on balls while playing for the Rochester Red Wings.

Phoebus began his major league career with the Baltimore Orioles, pitching complete-game shutouts in his first two starts, on September 15 and 20, 1966, against the Angels and Kansas City A's. He thus became just the fourth American League pitcher ever to do so. In 1967, Phoebus finished 14–9 with 179 strikeouts and a 3.33 ERA, en route to being selected The Sporting News Rookie of the Year.

On April 27, 1968, Phoebus no-hit the Red Sox 6–0 at Memorial Stadium. Converted outfielder Curt Blefary was the catcher. Meanwhile, third baseman Brooks Robinson helped at bat and made a great catch to rob a hit from Rico Petrocelli in the eighth inning. Frank Robinson would contribute with three RBIs in the win.

Phoebus won a career-high 15 games in that season, and 14 in 1969, including the American League Eastern Division clincher over Cleveland. He also won Game Two of the 1970 World Series as a relief pitcher in the third and fourth innings. Orioles teammate Boog Powell recalled that Phoebus had such an impressively arced curveball that even though his pitching motion tipped batters that a curve ball was coming, "It didn't matter because they couldn't hit it anyway."

Phoebus was traded along with Enzo Hernández, Fred Beene and Al Severinsen from the Orioles to the San Diego Padres for Pat Dobson and Tom Dukes on December 1, 1970. He finished his career with the Cubs in 1972.

In a seven-year career, Phoebus compiled a 56–52 record with 725 strikeouts and a 3.33 ERA in 1,030 innings pitched.

== Later life and death ==
Following baseball, Phoebus earned an education degree and taught grade school physical education in Bradenton, Florida and Port St. Lucie, Florida. He was divorced and the father of two children. Phoebus died on September 5, 2019, at the age of 77.

== See also ==
- List of Major League Baseball no-hitters

| Preceded by Joe Horlen | No-hitter pitcher April 27, 1968 | Succeeded by Catfish Hunter |
