= 1970 American League Championship Series =

2nd edition of Major League Baseball's American League Championship Series

Team (Wins)	Managers	Season
Baltimore Orioles (3)	Earl Weaver	108–54, .667, GA: 15
Minnesota Twins (0)	Bill Rigney	98–64, .605, GA: 9
- Dates: October 3–5
- Umpires: Johnny Stevens, Bill Deegan, Darold Satchell, Charlie Berry (Game 1); Bill Haller, Jim Odom, Jerry Neudecker, Jim Honochick, Russ Goetz, Marty Springstead (Games 2–3)

Broadcast
- Television: NBC; WJZ-TV (BAL); WTCN-TV (MIN)
- TV announcers: NBC: Jim Simpson and Sandy Koufax (in Minnesota); Curt Gowdy and Tony Kubek (in Baltimore); WJZ-TV: Chuck Thompson, Bill O'Donnell and John Gordon; WTCN-TV: Herb Carneal, Halsey Hall and Ray Christensen

The 1970 American League Championship Series was a semifinal matchup of the 1970 MLB Postseason between the East Division champion Baltimore Orioles and the West Division champion Minnesota Twins. Like the year before, the Orioles swept the Twins three games to none, though unlike the year before, the Orioles went on to win the World Series against the Cincinnati Reds.

(Note: Owing to a one-day strike by major league umpires, the series was begun using AL supervisor Berry, veteran umpire Stevens—who had been used in a substitute capacity in 1970—and minor league umpires Deegan and Satchell, with the regularly assigned crew returning for Games 2 and 3.)

== Summary ==
=== Baltimore Orioles vs. Minnesota Twins ===
Baltimore won the series, 3–0.

Game	Date	Score	Location	Time	Attendance
1	October 3	Baltimore Orioles – 10, Minnesota Twins – 6	Metropolitan Stadium	2:36	26,847
2	October 4	Baltimore Orioles – 11, Minnesota Twins – 3	Metropolitan Stadium	2:59	27,490
3	October 5	Minnesota Twins – 1, Baltimore Orioles – 6	Memorial Stadium	2:20	27,608

== Game summaries ==
=== Game 1 ===
October 3, 1970 3:00 pm (CT) at Metropolitan Stadium in Bloomington, Minnesota
Team	1	2	3	4	5	6	7	8	9	R	H	E
Baltimore	0	2	0	7	0	1	0	0	0	10	13	0
Minnesota	1	1	0	1	3	0	0	0	0	6	11	2
WP: Dick Hall (1–0) LP: Jim Perry (0–1); Home runs: BAL: Mike Cuellar (1), Don Buford (1), Boog Powell (1); MIN: Harmon Killebrew (1)

Baltimore only had to use their bullpen once in the series when Dick Hall came on to relieve Mike Cuellar in Game 1. Dave McNally and Jim Palmer both pitched complete games in Games 2 and 3.

The Twins enjoyed the lead only once, a 1–0 edge in Game 1 when César Tovar hit a leadoff single in the first, moved to second on a sacrifice bunt, and scored on Harmon Killebrew's single. In the second, Mark Belanger's bases-loaded groundout aided by an error put the Orioles up 2–1. The Twins' tied the score in the bottom of the inning on Jim Perry's groundout with runners on first and third, but the Orioles put the game out of reach in the fourth inning, aided by Cuellar's bat and the lusty blasts of a strong wind blowing across Metropolitan Stadium. Two singles and Brooks Robinson's sacrifice fly produced one fourth-inning run off Jim Perry, the Twins' 24-game winner, and the Orioles loaded the bases with one out after two more singles.

The lefthanded-hitting Cuellar, with a .089 batting average and 7 RBIs to show for his season's efforts, then pulled a Perry pitch toward foul territory in right field. As the ball passed first base it was patently foul. Cuellar himself stood transfixed at the plate, watching the pellet transcribe a high parabola in the direction of the right-field seats. As the ball soared into the 29-mile-an-hour current, however, it started drifting toward fair territory. Cuellar started jogging from the plate. By the time he arrived at first base, the wind had worked its devilry against the home forces, depositing the ball over the fence in fair territory, and giving Cuellar a grand slam. Then Don Buford cuffed Perry for a knock-out home run and reliever Bill Zepp yielded a left-field round-tripper to southpaw-swinging Boog Powell to complete the seven-run outburst.

The Twins got a run in the bottom of the inning on Tovar's single with two on. Next inning, Killebrew's leadoff home run made it 9–4. After a double, walk, and groundout, George Mitterwald's two-run single cut the lead to 9–6 and knock Cueller out of the game. Hall, a 40-year-old relief specialist, allowed only one hit in the final 4 2/3 innings to pick up the victory. The Orioles got one more run in the sixth on Powell's RBI single off of Stan Williams with the run charged to Dick Woodson.

=== Game 2 ===
October 4, 1970 3:00 pm (CT) at Metropolitan Stadium in Bloomington, Minnesota
Team	1	2	3	4	5	6	7	8	9	R	H	E
Baltimore	1	0	2	1	0	0	0	0	7	11	13	0
Minnesota	0	0	0	3	0	0	0	0	0	3	6	2
WP: Dave McNally (1–0) LP: Tom Hall (0–1); Home runs: BAL: Frank Robinson (1), Davey Johnson (1); MIN: Harmon Killebrew (2), Tony Oliva (1)

Dave McNally received the second-game assignment and once again delivered another great pitching performance en route to another O's victory. The Orioles handed McNally a four-run cushion. Boog Powell doubled home Mark Belanger in the first inning after two leadoff walks, Frank Robinson homered with Belanger aboard in the third and McNally himself singled home Andy Etchebarren in the fourth. The Twins nearly erased the lead with two swings of the bat in the bottom half, Harmon Killebrew connecting for a home run after a walk to Leo Cárdenas followed by a Tony Oliva home run.

Stan Williams, following Tom Hall and Bill Zepp to the mound, blanked Baltimore the next three frames and Ron Perranoski zeroed the visitors in the eighth before the East Division champs soon erupted for another big rally of runs. They scored seven runs in the inning to tie the record for most runs scored in the ninth inning of a postseason game, which had been done once before in 1936. After a double, single and walk loaded the bases with one out, Boog Powell drove in two runs with a double to left, then Merv Rettenmund drove in another with a single. Luis Tiant relieved Perranoski as Brooks Robinson reached on an error that allowed Powell to score before Davey Johnson's three-run home run capped the scoring at 11–3 Orioles. McNally pitched a complete game to give the Orioles a 2–0 series lead.

=== Game 3 ===
October 5, 1970 1:00 pm (ET) at Memorial Stadium in Baltimore, Maryland
Team	1	2	3	4	5	6	7	8	9	R	H	E
Minnesota	0	0	0	0	1	0	0	0	0	1	7	2
Baltimore	1	1	3	0	0	0	1	0	X	6	10	0
WP: Jim Palmer (1–0) LP: Jim Kaat (0–1); Home runs: MIN: None; BAL: Davey Johnson (2)

When the series shifted to Baltimore, Earl Weaver called on his workhouse Jim Palmer to wrap it all up. The big righthander, just 10 days short of his 25th birthday and two years removed from an arm ailment that threatened his career, was razor sharp, scattering seven hits. In fairness, Palmer was entitled to a shutout. A brilliant sun blinded Frank Robinson while he was tracking down César Tovar's fifth-inning fly that fell for a single. Cardenas' single produced a run after a triple, but that was all for the Twins.

A 20-game winner with a 2.71 ERA in regular season, Palmer set a personal career high of 12 strikeouts and issued only three walks. He also laced a double and figured prominently in the second-inning Oriole run when his blooper to short center field was misplayed for a two-base error. Palmer subsequently scored on Buford's single. The Twins starting assignment went to Jim Kaat, a 14-game winner who had been handicapped by late-season arm miseries. The Orioles struck first when Don Buford singled to lead off the first, moved to second on a sacrifice bunt, then to third on a fly out before scoring on Boog Powell's single. The left-hander departed with two on and none out in the third after yielding six hits. Andy Etchebarren's fielder's choice off of Bert Blyleven aided by an error allowed one to score. After a force out, Palmer's RBI double and Buford's sacrifice fly made it 5–0 Orioles. The Orioles got one more run in the seventh on Davey Johnson's home run off of Jim Perry. By that time the trend of the game had been established and three successors, while more effective, were helpless to change the outcome, the Birds cruising to an easy victory and the AL pennant.

The Orioles played flawless defense in the series, handling 110 total chances (81 putouts, 29 assists) perfectly.

== Composite line score ==
1970 ALCS (3–0): Baltimore Orioles over Minnesota Twins

Team	1	2	3	4	5	6	7	8	9	R	H	E
Baltimore Orioles	2	3	5	8	0	1	1	0	7	27	36	0
Minnesota Twins	1	1	0	4	4	0	0	0	0	10	24	6
Total attendance: 81,945 Average attendance: 27,315

== Aftermath ==
The Orioles, who had made it to the inaugural ALCS held the previous year, would continue their run the following year to mark three consecutive ALCS appearances on their way to what ultimately became five appearances in six seasons (1969–71, 1973–74), with Baltimore winning three in a row (which was tied by three teams before being surpassed by the 1998–01 New York Yankees).

The Twins quickly fell to the middle of the standing in the American League West for many years following 1970. The team moved to the Hubert H. Humphrey Metrodome in 1982 and owner Calvin Griffith sold to the team to Carl Pohlad in the middle of the 1984 season. The Twins did not reach the postseason again until 1987, when they upset the Detroit Tigers in the ALCS and St. Louis Cardinals in the World Series, to win the city's first pro sports championship since the 1953–54 Lakers.
