= 1970 Major League Baseball season =

1970 MLB season
- League: American League (AL); National League (NL)
- Sport: Baseball
- Duration: Regular season: April 6 – October 1, 1970; Postseason: October 3–15, 1970
- Games: 162
- Teams: 24 (12 per league)
- TV partner: NBC

Draft
- Top draft pick: Mike Ivie
- Picked by: San Diego Padres

Regular season
- Season MVP: AL: Boog Powell (BAL); NL: Johnny Bench (CIN)

Postseason
- AL champions: Baltimore Orioles
- AL runners-up: Minnesota Twins
- NL champions: Cincinnati Reds
- NL runners-up: Pittsburgh Pirates

World Series
- Champions: Baltimore Orioles
- Runners-up: Cincinnati Reds
- World Series MVP: Brooks Robinson (BAL)

MLB seasons
- ← 1969 1971 →

Locations of teams for the 1970–1971 American League seasons
West East
Locations of teams for the 1970 National League season
West East

The 1970 major league baseball season began on April 6, 1970, while the regular season ended on October 1. The postseason began on October 3. The 67th World Series began with Game 1 on October 10 and ended with Game 5 on October 15, with the Baltimore Orioles of the American League defeating the Cincinnati Reds of the National League, four games to one, capturing their second championship in franchise history, since their previous in 1966. Going into the season, the defending World Series champions were the New York Mets from the 1969 season.

The 41st All-Star Game was held on July 14 at Riverfront Stadium in Cincinnati, Ohio, home of the Cincinnati Reds. The National League won in 12 innings, 5–4, concluding their eight-season win streak.

During spring training, the Seattle Pilots moved to Milwaukee, Wisconsin as the Milwaukee Brewers, being the ninth team since 1953 to relocate, and the fifth of American League teams since them. Due to stadium issues and the team declaring bankruptcy, the team was sold to a Milwaukee-based group and promptly relocated. After having a team for only a single season, Seattle would be without a major league team for seven seasons until the expansion in 1977, with the enfranchisement of the Seattle Mariners. The team was tied with the coincidentally named 1901 Milwaukee Brewers (modern-day Baltimore Orioles) as the shortest-tenured team of the American League.

National League umpires began wearing numbers on the sleeves of their blazers and the new short-sleeved light blue shirts they began wearing (to replace the long sleeved shirts of previous years). The numbers were in alphabetical order (Al Barlick wore #1, Ken Burkhart #2, etc.) and this remained the annual numbering system until the 1979 season when the numbers became permanent regardless of retirements/resignations/firings/etc.

== Schedule ==
The 1970 schedule consisted of 162 games for all teams in the American League and National League, each of which had 12 teams. Each league was split into two six-team divisions. Each team was scheduled to play 18 games against their five division rivals, totaling 90 games, and 12 games against six interdivision opponents, totaling 72 games. This continued the format put in place since the previous season and would be used until 1977 in the American League and 1993 in the National League.

Opening Day took place on April 6, featuring four teams. The final day of the regular season was on October 1, featuring 22 teams. Each League Championship Series took place between October 3 and October 5. The World Series took place between October 10 and October 15.

== Rule change ==
The 1970 season saw the following rule change:

- A "caveat emptor" amendment was approved by both leagues, regarding player trades. Under the new rule, all trades, once agreed upon, would stand, such that a player could not elect to retire and freeze/cancel a trade as a means to stop it. Now, the trade would occur, and it was up to a team themselves to persuade their players to report to work.

== Teams ==
An asterisk (*) denotes the ballpark a team played the minority of their home games at

| League | Division | Team | City | Ballpark | Capacity | Manager |
|---|---|---|---|---|---|---|
| American League | East | Baltimore Orioles | Baltimore, Maryland | Baltimore Memorial Stadium | 53,208 | Earl Weaver |
| American League | East | Boston Red Sox | Boston, Massachusetts | Fenway Park | 33,368 | Eddie Kasko |
| American League | East | Cleveland Indians | Cleveland, Ohio | Cleveland Stadium | 74,483 | Alvin Dark |
| American League | East | Detroit Tigers | Detroit, Michigan | Tiger Stadium | 52,806 | Mayo Smith |
| American League | East | New York Yankees | New York, New York | Yankee Stadium | 67,000 | Ralph Houk |
| American League | East | Washington Senators | Washington, D.C. | Robert F. Kennedy Memorial Stadium | 45,016 | Ted Williams |
| American League | West | California Angels | Anaheim, California | Anaheim Stadium | 43,500 | Lefty Phillips |
| American League | West | Chicago White Sox | Chicago, Illinois | White Sox Park | 44,492 | Don Gutteridge |
| American League | West | Chicago White Sox | Chicago, Illinois | White Sox Park | 44,492 | Bill Adair |
| American League | West | Chicago White Sox | Chicago, Illinois | White Sox Park | 44,492 | Chuck Tanner |
| American League | West | Kansas City Royals | Kansas City, Missouri | Municipal Stadium | 35,561 | Charlie Metro |
| American League | West | Kansas City Royals | Kansas City, Missouri | Municipal Stadium | 35,561 | Bob Lemon |
| American League | West | Milwaukee Brewers | Milwaukee, Wisconsin | Milwaukee County Stadium | 53,192 | Dave Bristol |
| American League | West | Minnesota Twins | Bloomington, Minnesota | Metropolitan Stadium | 45,919 | Bill Rigney |
| American League | West | Oakland Athletics | Oakland, California | Oakland–Alameda County Coliseum | 50,000 | John McNamara |
| National League | East | Chicago Cubs | Chicago, Illinois | Wrigley Field | 36,755 | Leo Durocher |
| National League | East | Montreal Expos | Montreal, Quebec | Jarry Park Stadium | 29,125 | Gene Mauch |
| National League | East | New York Mets | New York, New York | Shea Stadium | 55,300 | Gil Hodges |
| National League | East | Philadelphia Phillies | Philadelphia, Pennsylvania | Connie Mack Stadium | 33,608 | Frank Lucchesi |
| National League | East | Pittsburgh Pirates | Pittsburgh, Pennsylvania | Forbes Field | 35,000 | Danny Murtaugh |
| National League | East | Pittsburgh Pirates | Pittsburgh, Pennsylvania | Three Rivers Stadium* | 50,500* | Danny Murtaugh |
| National League | East | St. Louis Cardinals | St. Louis, Missouri | Civic Center Busch Memorial Stadium | 53,138 | Red Schoendienst |
| National League | West | Atlanta Braves | Atlanta, Georgia | Atlanta Stadium | 51,383 | Lum Harris |
| National League | West | Cincinnati Reds | Cincinnati, Ohio | Crosley Field* | 29,488* | Sparky Anderson |
| National League | West | Cincinnati Reds | Cincinnati, Ohio | Riverfront Stadium | 52,953 | Sparky Anderson |
| National League | West | Houston Astros | Houston, Texas | Houston Astrodome | 47,000 | Harry Walker |
| National League | West | Los Angeles Dodgers | Los Angeles, California | Dodger Stadium | 56,000 | Walter Alston |
| National League | West | San Diego Padres | San Diego, California | San Diego Stadium | 50,000 | Preston Gómez |
| National League | West | San Francisco Giants | San Francisco, California | Candlestick Park | 45,744 | Clyde King |
| National League | West | San Francisco Giants | San Francisco, California | Candlestick Park | 45,744 | Charlie Fox |

== Standings ==
=== American League ===
AL East
| Team | W | L | Pct. | GB | Home | Road |
|---|---|---|---|---|---|---|
| Baltimore Orioles | 108 | 54 | .667 | — | 59‍–‍22 | 49‍–‍32 |
| New York Yankees | 93 | 69 | .574 | 15 | 53‍–‍28 | 40‍–‍41 |
| Boston Red Sox | 87 | 75 | .537 | 21 | 52‍–‍29 | 35‍–‍46 |
| Detroit Tigers | 79 | 83 | .488 | 29 | 42‍–‍39 | 37‍–‍44 |
| Cleveland Indians | 76 | 86 | .469 | 32 | 43‍–‍38 | 33‍–‍48 |
| Washington Senators | 70 | 92 | .432 | 38 | 40‍–‍41 | 30‍–‍51 |

AL West
| Team | W | L | Pct. | GB | Home | Road |
|---|---|---|---|---|---|---|
| Minnesota Twins | 98 | 64 | .605 | — | 51‍–‍30 | 47‍–‍34 |
| Oakland Athletics | 89 | 73 | .549 | 9 | 49‍–‍32 | 40‍–‍41 |
| California Angels | 86 | 76 | .531 | 12 | 43‍–‍38 | 43‍–‍38 |
| Kansas City Royals | 65 | 97 | .401 | 33 | 35‍–‍44 | 30‍–‍53 |
| Milwaukee Brewers | 65 | 97 | .401 | 33 | 38‍–‍42 | 27‍–‍55 |
| Chicago White Sox | 56 | 106 | .346 | 42 | 31‍–‍53 | 25‍–‍53 |

=== National League ===
NL East
| Team | W | L | Pct. | GB | Home | Road |
|---|---|---|---|---|---|---|
| Pittsburgh Pirates | 89 | 73 | .549 | — | 50‍–‍32 | 39‍–‍41 |
| Chicago Cubs | 84 | 78 | .519 | 5 | 46‍–‍34 | 38‍–‍44 |
| New York Mets | 83 | 79 | .512 | 6 | 44‍–‍38 | 39‍–‍41 |
| St. Louis Cardinals | 76 | 86 | .469 | 13 | 34‍–‍47 | 42‍–‍39 |
| Philadelphia Phillies | 73 | 88 | .453 | 15½ | 40‍–‍40 | 33‍–‍48 |
| Montreal Expos | 73 | 89 | .451 | 16 | 39‍–‍41 | 34‍–‍48 |

NL West
| Team | W | L | Pct. | GB | Home | Road |
|---|---|---|---|---|---|---|
| Cincinnati Reds | 102 | 60 | .630 | — | 57‍–‍24 | 45‍–‍36 |
| Los Angeles Dodgers | 87 | 74 | .540 | 14½ | 39‍–‍42 | 48‍–‍32 |
| San Francisco Giants | 86 | 76 | .531 | 16 | 48‍–‍33 | 38‍–‍43 |
| Houston Astros | 79 | 83 | .488 | 23 | 44‍–‍37 | 35‍–‍46 |
| Atlanta Braves | 76 | 86 | .469 | 26 | 42‍–‍39 | 34‍–‍47 |
| San Diego Padres | 63 | 99 | .389 | 39 | 31‍–‍50 | 32‍–‍49 |

=== Tie game ===
1 tie game (1 in AL, 0 in NL), which is not factored into winning percentage or games behind (and was replayed again) occurred during the season.

==== American League ====
- May 11, Milwaukee Brewers vs. New York Yankees, tied at 5 in the top of the 10th inning after a 38 minute rain delay; game called at 11:43 p.m.

== Postseason ==
The postseason began on October 3 and ended on October 15 with the Baltimore Orioles defeating the Cincinnati Reds in the 1970 World Series in five games.

=== Bracket ===
League Championship Series (ALCS, NLCS)
East | Baltimore | 3
West | Minnesota | 0
East | Pittsburgh | 0
West | Cincinnati | 3

World Series
AL | Baltimore | 4
NL | Cincinnati | 1

== Managerial changes ==
=== Off-season ===
| Team | Former Manager | New Manager |
|---|---|---|
| Boston Red Sox | Eddie Popowski | Eddie Kasko |
| Cincinnati Reds | Dave Bristol | Sparky Anderson |
| Kansas City Royals | Joe Gordon | Charlie Metro |
| Milwaukee Brewers | Joe Schultz Jr. (Seattle Pilots) | Dave Bristol |
| Minnesota Twins | Billy Martin | Bill Rigney |
| Philadelphia Phillies | George Myatt | Frank Lucchesi |
| Pittsburgh Pirates | Alex Grammas | Danny Murtaugh |

=== In-season ===
| Team | Former Manager | New Manager |
|---|---|---|
| Chicago White Sox | Don Gutteridge | Bill Adair |
| Chicago White Sox | Bill Adair | Chuck Tanner |
| Kansas City Royals | Charlie Metro | Bob Lemon |
| San Francisco Giants | Clyde King | Charlie Fox |

== League leaders ==
=== American League ===
Hitting leaders
| Stat | Player | Total |
|---|---|---|
| AVG | Alex Johnson (CAL) | .329 |
| OPS | Carl Yastrzemski (BOS) | 1.044 |
| HR | Frank Howard (WAS) | 44 |
| RBI | Frank Howard (WAS) | 126 |
| R | Carl Yastrzemski (BOS) | 125 |
| H | Tony Oliva (MIN) | 204 |
| SB | Bert Campaneris (OAK) | 42 |

Pitching leaders
| Stat | Player | Total |
|---|---|---|
| W | Mike Cuellar (BAL); Dave McNally (BAL); Jim Perry (MIN) | 24 |
| L | Mickey Lolich (DET) | 19 |
| ERA | Diego Seguí (OAK) | 2.56 |
| K | Sam McDowell (CLE) | 304 |
| IP | Sam McDowell (CLE); Jim Palmer (BAL) | 305.0 |
| SV | Ron Perranoski (MIN) | 34 |
| WHIP | Fritz Peterson (NYY) | 1.102 |

=== National League ===
Hitting leaders
| Stat | Player | Total |
|---|---|---|
| AVG | Rico Carty (ATL) | .366 |
| OPS | Willie McCovey (SF) | 1.056 |
| HR | Johnny Bench (CIN) | 45 |
| RBI | Johnny Bench (CIN) | 148 |
| R | Billy Williams (CHC) | 137 |
| H | Pete Rose (CIN); Billy Williams (CHC) | 205 |
| SB | Bobby Tolan (CIN) | 57 |

Pitching leaders
| Stat | Player | Total |
|---|---|---|
| W | Bob Gibson (STL); Gaylord Perry (SF) | 23 |
| L | Steve Carlton (STL) | 19 |
| ERA | Tom Seaver (NYM) | 2.82 |
| K | Tom Seaver (NYM) | 283 |
| IP | Gaylord Perry (SF) | 328.2 |
| SV | Wayne Granger (CIN) | 35 |
| WHIP | Ferguson Jenkins (CHC) | 1.038 |

== Milestones ==
=== Batters ===
==== Cycles ====
- Wes Parker (LAD):
  - Parker hit for his first cycle and eighth in franchise history, on May 7 against the New York Mets.
- Rod Carew (MIN):
  - Carew hit for his first cycle and fifth in franchise history, on May 20 against the Kansas City Royals.
- Tony Horton (CLE):
  - Horton hit for his first cycle and fifth in franchise history, on July 2 against the Baltimore Orioles.
- Tommie Agee (NYM):
  - Agee hit for his first cycle and second in franchise history, on July 6 against the St. Louis Cardinals.
- Jim Ray Hart (SF):
  - Hart hit for his first cycle and 14th in franchise history, on July 8 against the Atlanta Braves.

==== Other batting accomplishments ====
- Ernie Banks (CHC):
  - Became the ninth player in Major League history to hit 500 home runs in the second inning against the Atlanta Braves on May 12.
- Hank Aaron (ATL):
  - Became the ninth member of the 3,000-hit club with a single in the first inning in game two of a doubleheader against the Cincinnati Reds on May 17.
- César Gutiérrez (DET):
  - Tied a major league record and set a modern major league record when he hit seven times in one nine inning game against the Cleveland Indians in game two of a doubleheader on June 21.
- Frank Robinson (BAL):
  - Became the seventh player to hit two grand slams in a single game, in a 12–2 win over the Washington Senators on June 26.
- Jim Ray Hart (SF):
  - Ties a major league record with six runs batted in during one inning, by hitting a three-run home run and a three-run triple in the fifth inning against the Atlanta Braves on July 8.
- Willie Mays (SF):
  - Became the 10th member of the 3,000-hit club with a single in the second inning against the Montreal Expos on July 18.
- Vic Davalillo (STL):
  - Breaks the National League single-season pinch hitting record and ties the Major League record with his 24th pinch hit of the year on October 1.

=== Pitchers ===
==== No-hitters ====
- Dock Ellis (PIT):
  - Ellis threw his first career no-hitter and fourth no-hitter in franchise history, by defeating the San Diego Padres 2–0 in game one of a doubleheader on June 12. He walked eight, hit one by pitch, and struck out six.
- Clyde Wright (CAL):
  - Wright threw his first career no-hitter and second no-hitter in franchise history, by defeating the Oakland Athletics 4–0 on July 3. He walked three and struck out one.
- Bill Singer (LAD):
  - Singer threw his first career no-hitter and 18th no-hitter in franchise history, by defeating the Philadelphia Phillies 5–0 on July 20. He walked none, hit one by pitch, and struck out 10.
- Vida Blue (OAK):
  - Blue threw his first career no-hitter and seventh no-hitter in franchise history, by defeating the Minnesota Twins 6–0 on September 21. He walked one and struck out nine.

==== Other pitching accomplishments ====
- Tom Seaver (NYM):
  - Became the fourth all-time and second modern Major League player to strike out 19 batters for most strikeouts in a single nine-inning game in a 2–1 win against the San Diego Padres on April 22.
- Hoyt Wilhelm (CHC/ATL):
  - Became the first pitcher to make 1,000 pitching appearances as a member of the Atlanta Braves on May 10.

=== Miscellaneous ===
- Billy Williams (CHC):
  - Set a National League record of 1,117 consecutive games played when he plays his final game of the streak on September 2.

== Awards and honors ==
=== Regular season ===
Baseball Writers' Association of America Awards
| BBWAA Award | National League | American League |
|---|---|---|
| Rookie of the Year | Carl Morton (MON) | Thurman Munson (NYY) |
| Cy Young Award | Bob Gibson (STL) | Jim Perry (MIN) |
| Most Valuable Player | Johnny Bench (CIN) | Boog Powell (BAL) |
| Babe Ruth Award (World Series MVP) | — | Brooks Robinson (BAL) |
Gold Glove Awards
| Position | National League | American League |
| Pitcher | Bob Gibson (STL) | Jim Kaat (MIN) |
| Catcher | Johnny Bench (CIN) | Ray Fosse (CLE) |
| 1st Base | Wes Parker (LAD) | Jim Spencer (CAL) |
| 2nd Base | Tommy Helms (CIN) | Davey Johnson (BAL) |
| 3rd Base | Doug Rader (HOU) | Brooks Robinson (BAL) |
| Shortstop | Don Kessinger (CHC) | Luis Aparicio (CWS) |
| Outfield | Tommie Agee (NYM) | Ken Berry (CWS) |
| Outfield | Roberto Clemente (PIT) | Paul Blair (BAL) |
| Outfield | Pete Rose (CIN) | Mickey Stanley (DET) |

=== Other awards ===
- Hutch Award: Tony Conigliaro (BOS)
- Sport Magazine's World Series Most Valuable Player Award: Brooks Robinson (BAL)

The Sporting News Awards
| Award | National League | American League |
|---|---|---|
| Player of the Year | Johnny Bench (CIN) | — |
| Pitcher of the Year | Bob Gibson (STL) | Sam McDowell (CLE) |
| Fireman of the Year (Relief pitcher) | Wayne Granger (CIN) | Ron Perranoski (MIN) |
| Rookie Player of the Year | Bernie Carbo (CIN) | Roy Foster (CLE) |
| Rookie Pitcher of the Year | Carl Morton (MON) | Bert Blyleven (MIN) |
| Comeback Player of the Year | Jim Hickman (CHC) | Clyde Wright (CAL) |
| Manager of the Year | Danny Murtaugh (PIT) | — |
| Executive of the Year | — | Harry Dalton (BAL) |

=== Monthly awards ===
==== Player of the Month ====
| Month | National League |
|---|---|
| May | Rico Carty (ATL) |
| June | Tommie Agee (NYM) |
| July | Bill Singer (LAD) |
| August | Bob Gibson (STL) |

=== Baseball Hall of Fame ===
- Lou Boudreau
- Earle Combs
- Jesse Haines
- Ford Frick (executive)

== Home field attendance ==
| Team name | Wins | %± | Home attendance | %± | Per game |
|---|---|---|---|---|---|
| New York Mets | 83 | −17.0% | 2,697,479 | 24.0% | 32,896 |
| Cincinnati Reds | 102 | 14.6% | 1,803,568 | 82.5% | 22,266 |
| Los Angeles Dodgers | 87 | 2.4% | 1,697,142 | −4.9% | 20,952 |
| Chicago Cubs | 84 | −8.7% | 1,642,705 | −1.9% | 20,534 |
| St. Louis Cardinals | 76 | −12.6% | 1,629,736 | −3.2% | 20,120 |
| Boston Red Sox | 87 | 0.0% | 1,595,278 | −13.0% | 19,695 |
| Detroit Tigers | 79 | −12.2% | 1,501,293 | −4.8% | 18,534 |
| Montreal Expos | 73 | 40.4% | 1,424,683 | 17.5% | 17,809 |
| Pittsburgh Pirates | 89 | 1.1% | 1,341,947 | 74.4% | 16,365 |
| Minnesota Twins | 98 | 1.0% | 1,261,887 | −6.5% | 15,579 |
| Houston Astros | 79 | −2.5% | 1,253,444 | −13.1% | 15,475 |
| New York Yankees | 93 | 16.3% | 1,136,879 | 6.4% | 14,036 |
| Atlanta Braves | 76 | −18.3% | 1,078,848 | −26.0% | 13,319 |
| California Angels | 86 | 21.1% | 1,077,741 | 42.1% | 13,305 |
| Baltimore Orioles | 108 | −0.9% | 1,057,069 | −0.5% | 13,050 |
| Milwaukee Brewers | 65 | 1.6% | 933,690 | 37.7% | 11,527 |
| Washington Senators | 70 | −18.6% | 824,789 | −10.2% | 10,183 |
| Oakland Athletics | 89 | 1.1% | 778,355 | 0.0% | 9,609 |
| San Francisco Giants | 86 | −4.4% | 740,720 | −15.2% | 9,145 |
| Cleveland Indians | 76 | 22.6% | 729,752 | 17.7% | 9,009 |
| Philadelphia Phillies | 73 | 15.9% | 708,247 | 36.4% | 8,853 |
| Kansas City Royals | 65 | −5.8% | 693,047 | −23.2% | 8,773 |
| San Diego Padres | 63 | 21.2% | 643,679 | 25.5% | 7,947 |
| Chicago White Sox | 56 | −17.6% | 495,355 | −16.0% | 5,897 |

== Venues ==
The 1970 season saw three teams move to three new venues.

- With the relocation of the Seattle Pilots from Seattle, Washington to Milwaukee, Wisconsin as the Milwaukee Brewers, they leave Sick's Stadium and move into the former home of the National League's Milwaukee Braves, Milwaukee County Stadium. They would go on to play there for 31 seasons through 2000.
- The Cincinnati Reds would play their last game at Crosley Field on June 24, having played 59 seasons there, and opened Riverfront Stadium on June 30, where they would go on to play for 33 seasons through 2002.
- The Pittsburgh Pirates would play their last game at Forbes Field on June 28, having played 62 seasons there, and opened Three Rivers Stadium (with the NFL's Pittsburgh Steelers) on July 16, where they would go on to play for 31 seasons through 2000.

The Philadelphia Phillies would play their final game at Connie Mack Stadium on October 1 against the Montreal Expos, moving into Veterans Stadium for the start of the 1971 season.

== Media ==
=== Television ===
NBC was the exclusive national TV broadcaster of MLB, airing the weekend Game of the Week, the All-Star Game, both League Championship Series, and the World Series.

== Retired numbers ==
- Lou Boudreau had his No. 5 retired by the Cleveland Indians on July 9. This was the second number retired by the team.
- Casey Stengel had his No. 37 retired by the New York Yankees on August 8. This was the fifth number retired by the team. Stengel previously had his No. 37 retired by the New York Mets in 1965.

== See also ==
- 1970 in baseball (Events, Births, Deaths)
- 1970 Nippon Professional Baseball season
