= Jim Hardin =

American baseball player (1943–1991)

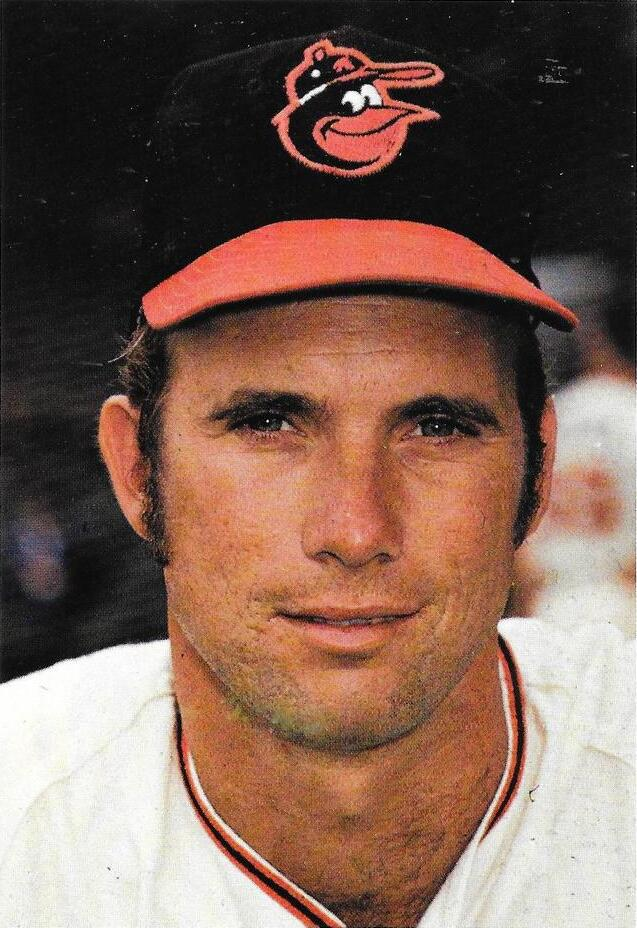
- Hardin in 1970
- Pitcher
- Born: August 6, 1943; Morris Chapel, Tennessee, U.S.
- Died: March 9, 1991 (aged 47); Key West, Florida, U.S.
- Batted: Right Threw: Right

MLB debut
- June 23, 1967, for the Baltimore Orioles

Last MLB appearance
- October 4, 1972, for the Atlanta Braves

MLB statistics
- Win–loss record: 43–32
- Earned run average: 3.18
- Strikeouts: 408
- Stats at Baseball Reference

Teams
- Baltimore Orioles (1967–1971); New York Yankees (1971); Atlanta Braves (1972)

Career highlights and awards
- World Series champion (1970)

James Warren Hardin (August 6, 1943 – March 9, 1991) was an American professional baseball player. He played in Major League Baseball as a right-handed pitcher from 1967 through 1972, most notably as a member of the Baltimore Orioles dynasty that won three consecutive American League pennants from 1969 to 1971, and won the World Series in 1970. He also played for the New York Yankees and the Atlanta Braves.

== Baseball career ==
Hardin attended Memphis State University to play baseball from 1961 to 1962. While at Memphis State, he turned down offers to go pro, and after only 14 college games, Hardin signed a contract with the New York Mets, which included a $10,000 bonus. Despite higher offers from other teams, Hardin picked the Mets, at the time a new expansion team with a lot of opportunities. Hardin spent three years in the Mets' minor league system before he drafted by the Baltimore Orioles in the 1965 minor league draft. In 1967, he was called up from the minor leagues to replace an injured Jim Palmer.

On May 10, 1969, in a relief appearance, Hardin hit a game-winning walk-off home run in the bottom of the ninth inning in Baltimore's Memorial Stadium. On July 27, 1969, Hardin starred in the Orioles' most dominant shut-out victory in their history, routing the Chicago White Sox, 17–0. Hardin took the win over Billy Wynne, allowing just two hits with five strikeouts and also hit a home run in the fourth inning off Gary Bell. He pitched a complete-game shutout on May 26, 1970, against the Cleveland Indians, allowing only five singles in the game. Three weeks later, Hardin pitched ten innings surrendering only six hits with zero walks versus the Washington Senators. The Orioles prevailed 3–2 in 13 innings with Pete Richert earning the win with three relief innings. In Cleveland on August 6, 1970, Hardin threw a complete game five-hitter in the second game of a doubleheader against the Indians. Hardin helped himself with a two-run triple in the second inning and also picked up another RBI by drawing a bases-loaded walk in the eighth inning. As a member of the Atlanta Braves on June 28, 1972, he hit a 2-out solo home run in the 4th inning off the Padres' Fred Norman in San Diego Stadium.

While Hardin was with the Orioles, Palmer reported that some of the players did not like him very much. "But Brooks Robinson and Davey Leonhard and me, we think he's a decent guy if you get to know him, which most of the others didn't do." "Hardin really was an impressive pitcher before he hurt his shoulder," Palmer described him. "He had great control."

== Death ==
Hardin, a pilot, died on March 9, 1991, when his Beech 35-C33A crashed in Key West, Florida. Shortly after taking off from Key West International Airport the propeller of his aircraft failed from fatigue. The aircraft stalled and the plane crashed while Hardin attempted to return to the airport to make an emergency landing. It was widely reported that, during the plane's descent, Hardin steered the plane away from a baseball field filled with young children. The plane crashed in a parking lot of a TGI Fridays restaurant, which was under construction at the time. Hardin was survived by his wife and three children.
