= Jim Odom =

American baseball umpire (1921-1989)

- Born: James Cecil Odom; July 16, 1921; Bennettsville, South Carolina, U.S.
- Died: January 18, 1989 (aged 67); Bennettsville, South Carolina, U.S.
- Occupation: Umpire
- Years active: 1965–1974
- Employer: American League

James Cecil Odom (July 16, 1921 – January 18, 1989) was an American professional baseball umpire who worked in the American League from 1965 to 1974. Odom umpired 1,597 major league games in his 10-year career. He umpired in the 1971 World Series, two League Championship Series (1970 and 1973) and the 1968 Major League Baseball All-Star Game.

== Minor leagues ==
Jim umpired for 18 years before being promoted to the major leagues. His minor league service included time in the West Texas–New Mexico League, Tobacco State League, Big State League, Sally League, Texas League and International League.

== Notable games ==
In 1971, Odom served as home plate umpire for the last game in Washington Senators history. With the Senators up by two runs in the ninth inning, Senators fans began to storm the field. With only one out needed to win the game, the crowd became uncontrollable and the game was forfeited to New York.

== Personal life ==
Odom attended high school in Bennettsville, South Carolina, where he played three sports. Early in his career, Odom spent the offseason working for Young Pecan Company of Florence, South Carolina.

Jim's younger brother Harvey was an umpire who worked in several minor league circuits.

== See also ==
- List of Major League Baseball umpires (disambiguation)
