= Boog Powell =

American baseball player (born 1941)

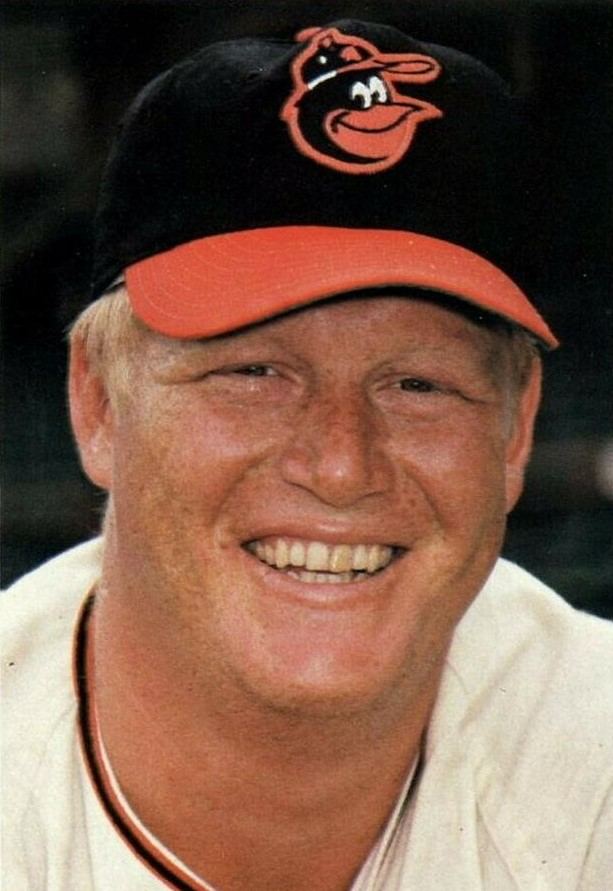
- Powell with the Baltimore Orioles in 1972
- First baseman
- Born: August 17, 1941 (age 85); Lakeland, Florida, U.S.
- Batted: Left Threw: Right

MLB debut
- September 26, 1961, for the Baltimore Orioles

Last MLB appearance
- August 24, 1977, for the Los Angeles Dodgers

MLB statistics
- Batting average: .266
- Home runs: 339
- Runs batted in: 1,187
- Stats at Baseball Reference

Teams
- Baltimore Orioles (1961–1974); Cleveland Indians (1975–1976); Los Angeles Dodgers (1977)

Career highlights and awards
- 4× All-Star (1968–1971); 2× World Series champion (1966, 1970); AL MVP (1970); Baltimore Orioles Hall of Fame

John Wesley "Boog" Powell (born August 17, 1941) is an American former professional baseball player. He played in Major League Baseball (MLB) as a first baseman and left fielder from 1961 through 1977, most prominently as a member of the Baltimore Orioles dynasty that won four American League pennants and two World Series championships between 1966 and 1971. The four-time All-Star led the American League in 1964 with a .606 slugging percentage and won the American League Most Valuable Player Award (MVP) in 1970. Has was second in MVP voting in 1969, and third in 1966. He also played for the Cleveland Indians, with whom he led all MLB first basemen in fielding percentage in 1975; and finished his career with the Los Angeles Dodgers. In 1979, Powell was inducted into the Baltimore Orioles Hall of Fame.

In a 17-season career, Powell posted a .266 batting average with 339 home runs, 1,187 runs batted in, a .462 slugging percentage and a .361 on-base percentage in 2,042 games. Powell hit three home runs in a game three times, and stands third only behind Eddie Murray and Cal Ripken Jr. on the all-time home run list of the Orioles.

Powell was the first player to play in the Little League World Series and appear in an MLB World Series (appearing three innings before the Los Angeles Dodgers’ Jim Barbieri in the 1966 World Series; they had faced each other in the 1954 Little League World Series).

== Early life ==
Powell was born in Lakeland, Florida on August 17, 1941. As a 13-year old he played for that city's team in the 1954 Little League World Series, as a pitcher. Powell won eight games in tournament play, but his team lost to a team from Schenectady, New York. After his family moved to Key West when he was 15, Powell played at Key West High School and graduated in 1959. He led Key West to a state championship. Powell received the nickname "Boog" from his father. As Powell explained, "In the South they call little kids who are often getting into mischief buggers (pronounced 'boogers'), and my dad shortened it to Boog".

== Career ==
=== Baltimore Orioles (signing and minor league career) ===
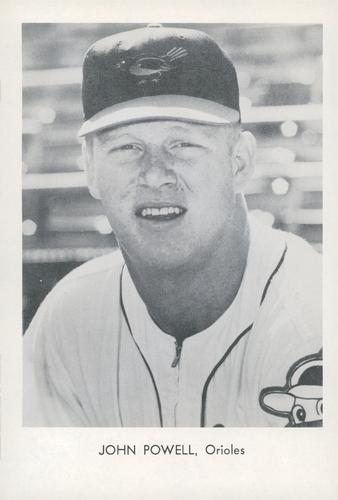
Powell in 1966

Powell signed with the Baltimore Orioles as an amateur free agent in 1959. He was originally scouted for the Orioles by Fred Hofmann, who had been a teammate of Babe Ruth; and thought he was seeing another Babe Ruth when he watched Powell playing high school baseball in Florida. Jim Russo, the scout who signed Powell with the Orioles, was also the scout who would sign Jim Palmer and Dave McNally with the Orioles, among others.

Powell's signing occurred at a time before the Major League Baseball draft. Both the Orioles and St. Louis Cardinals were pursuing the 18-year old Powell as a free agent. Jim McLauglin, the head of the Orioles' minor league system and scouting staff contacted Walter Shannon, the head of the Cardinals' minor league system. McLaughlin suggested that they flip a coin to determine who would approach Powell with a contract offer, rather than have a bidding war over Powell as a true free agent in a competitive market. McLauglin, Shannon, Russo and Cardinals' scout Whitey Reis met for the coin flip, with Russo successfully calling tails. Russo signed Powell for a $25,000 bonus, tens of thousands of dollars less than the Orioles or Cardinals would have paid Powell if they bid against each other.

In 1959, Powell played 56 games for the Bluefield Orioles of the Appalachian League, batting .351, with 14 home runs in 191 at bats. Defensively, he played in the outfield. The following season, he batted .312 with 13 home runs for the Fox Cities Foxes of the Class B Three-I League, playing in Appleton, Wisconsin. Among his Foxes' teammates were Powell's future Orioles manager Earl Weaver, Cal Ripken, Sr., future Orioles general manager Pat Gillick, and future Cy Young Award winner Dean Chance. The Orioles had him playing first base that season.

In 1961, the Orioles promoted Powell to the Triple-A Rochester Red Wings of the International League (IL). Powell joined the Orioles late in 1961, after leading the International League in home runs. At Rochester, he had a .321 batting average, with 32 home runs, 92 runs batted in (RBI), 86 runs scored, and a .981 OPS (on-base plus slugging). In addition to leading the IL in home runs, Powell was fifth in batting average, first in OPS, first in slugging percentage (.593), second in RBIs, and sixth in runs.

Defensively, Powell played 112 games at first base and 44 in the outfield for the Red Wings in 1961. Powell himself observed that he had signed as an outfielder and the Orioles had tried to convert him to a first baseman in 1960 and 1961, but "'Jim Gentile came along and it was pretty evident that I couldn't play first base for a couple of years. So they put me back in the outfield'". In 1961, Gentile was an All-Star first baseman for the Orioles, and hit .302, with 46 home runs and 141 RBIs; ranking third in American League Most Valuable Player voting.

=== Baltimore Orioles (MLB) ===
Powell joined the Orioles in 1962. He started 112 games in left field as a rookie in 1962, 121 games in left field and 14 at first base in 1963, and 114 in left field in 1964. In 1962, he hit .243 in 400 at bats as a rookie, with 15 home runs and 53 RBIs. He became the first player to hit a home run over the left-center field hedges in Baltimore's Memorial Stadium; going 469 feet. He was fifth among American League left fielders with a .969 fielding percentage; in a ten-team league. In 1963, Powell hit .265, with 25 home runs, 82 RBIs, 67 runs, and a .470 slugging percentage. He hit three home runs in a single game on August 10, 1963, against the Washington Senators. He was again fifth among American League left fielders, with a .970 fielding percentage.

Powell's breakout season as a batter came in 1964. He hit .290, led the American League in slugging percentage (.606), and had a career-high 39 home runs; despite missing several weeks because of a fractured wrist. On June 27, he again hit three home runs in a game against the Washington Senators. Powell was second in the American League to Harmon Killebrew in home runs. His 99 RBIs were eighth in the American League. Powell was second among American League left fielders, with a .976 fielding percentage. Powell slumped to .248 with 17 home runs in 1965, splitting time between the outfield (70 starts) and first base (58 starts) defensively.

The 6 ft 3 in (1.93 m) 240 lb (108.9 kg) Powell spent his first three seasons in Baltimore as a left fielder before playing a significant number of games at first base in 1965. The Orioles had All-Star first baseman Jim Gentile in 1962 and 1963, and Norm Siebern at first base in 1964 who was third in the AL in fielding percentage among first baseman. In 1962, Orioles manager Billy Hitchcock had said Powell would start in left field during his rookie season and was good defensively; running well for a person his size, with a fine throwing arm. In 1964, while playing left field in Boston's Fenway Park, Powell crashed into the outfield wall and broke his wrist; missing 15 games. Powell had been running so hard to catch a ball that he could not stop himself before hitting the wall.

Powell suffered from shin splints during Oriole spring training camps, but they were particularly bad before the start of the 1965 season, and the Orioles considered using him at first base. Orioles' business manager Herb Armstrong stated that Powell's shin difficulties while playing in the outfield where he would have to run, could manifest in different ways if he was moved to first base. He believed Powell was better off in the outfield; where he had improved and was now comparable to other left fielders defensively. However, with the development of rookie Paul Blair, Orioles' manager Hank Bauer used a platoon system with Powell in 1965; Powell playing left field against right-handed pitchers with Norm Siebern at first base, and playing first base against left-handed pitchers with Blair starting in center field and 1965 AL Rookie of the Year Curt Blefary in left field.

In 1966, Powell became the Orioles' full time first baseman, starting 132 games at first base. He hit .287, with 34 home runs, 109 RBIs, a .532 slugging percentage, and .372 on base percentage. He hit three home runs in a game against the Boston Red Sox on August 15, 1966. The Associated Press (AP) and The Sporting News selected Powell as the American League Comeback Player of the Year in 1966; and he was third in the American League Most Valuable Player voting, behind teammates Frank Robinson and Brooks Robinson. Powell was third in the American League in home runs and RBIs, fourth in batting average and slugging percentage, and fifth in on base percentage. He attained these achievements while being hampered by a chip fracture on the knuckle of his right ring finger after being hit by a Denny McLain pitch in late August.

Powell, along with players such as Hall of Famers Frank Robinson, Brooks Robinson, Luis Aparicio, and Jim Palmer, helped lead the Orioles to reach, and win, the 1966 World Series; where they surprised the baseball world by sweeping the Los Angeles Dodgers to become world champions. Leonard Koppett of the New York Times began his article on the Orioles' sweep, "As if predestined to produce the most astonishing result in modern baseball history, the 1966 World Series ended today with the Baltimore Orioles sweeping the Los Angeles Dodgers in four straight games". Powell had the highest batting average (.357) of any player in the series. Powell and the Dodgers' Jim Barbieri (who was in the Little League World Series in 1953 and 1954 for Schenectady) became the first players to have played in both the Little League World Series and MLB World Series. Powell was the Orioles' starting first baseman, and Barbieri only appeared in the 1966 World Series once; as a pinch hitter in the fourth inning of Game 1 (which would be his last at bat as an MLB player).

Before the 1967 season began, Powell stated "'Once, just once . . . I'd like to go through a whole season without an injury. I really mean put one together'". Powell had an off year in 1967, hitting only .234 with 13 home runs. He started only 109 games, as manager Hank Bauer used Curt Blefary at first base for much of the season's second half. From 1968 to 1970, however, Powell played in over 150 games each season.

Powell's batting average only improved to .249 in 1968, but he led the Orioles with 22 home runs and 85 RBIs that season. This was the "Year of the Pitcher"; when the MLB batting average was .237, the MLB earned run average was 2.98, and only one player in the American League had a batting average over .300. Powell was tied for fourth in the AL in RBIs and tied for eighth in home runs that season. He was selected to play in the 1968 All-Star Game. He was fifth among American League first basemen in fielding percentage (.990).

In 1969, Powell hit a career-high .304, with 37 home runs, 121 RBIs, a .559 slugging percentage and .383 on-base percentage. He was second in the American League in RBIs, fifth in batting average and slugging percentage, sixth in home runs, and seventh in OPS (.942). Has was third among American League first basemen in fielding percentage (.995) behind only Joe Pepitone and Don Mincher (both also .995).

Powell was the starting first baseman and cleanup hitter for the American League in the 1969 All-Star Game, playing the entire game and going one-for-four. The Orioles won the first ever American League Championship Series (ALCS) 3–0 over the Minnesota Twins (Powell hitting .385 with one home run), but lost to the New York Mets in the 1969 World Series in five games (Powell hitting .263). Powell was second in the American League Most Valuable Player voting in 1969, behind Harmon Killebrew, who played both third and first base that season.

In 1970, Powell was selected as the American League Most Valuable Player. A full-time first baseman had not been named an AL MVP since Jimmie Foxx in 1938. He hit 35 home runs with 114 RBIs, a .549 slugging percentage, .962 OPS, and a .297 batting average (falling below .300 during the last week of the season). He had career highs with 104 bases on balls and a .412 on base percentage. Powell was second in the AL in slugging percentage, third in RBIs, on base percentage and OPS, and fifth in home runs. Powell said the only time during the season he did not play well was during a period in August when he had a muscle tear in his right foot.

Powell was again the starting first baseman and cleanup hitter in the All-Star Game. The Orioles again defeated the Twins 3–0 in the 1970 ALCS. Powell hit .429 with a home run and six RBIs against the Twins. In the 1970 World Series, Powell hit home runs in the first two games as the Orioles defeated the Cincinnati Reds in five games. Powell hit .294 with five RBIs and a 1.160 OPS over the five game series.

Prior to the 1971 season, Powell appeared on the cover of Sports Illustrated for the 1971 baseball preview issue. He hit .256, with 22 home runs and 92 RBIs that season. He was second in the American League and third among all MLB first basemen with a .995 fielding percentage. He was selected to play in the All-Star Game for a fourth consecutive season. Powell helped Baltimore reach a third straight World Series that year, after defeating the Oakland Athletics 3–0 in the 1971 ALCS. He hit .300 in the ALCS and had a pair of home runs in Game 2 against future Hall of Fame pitcher Catfish Hunter, but he hit only .111 in the 1971 World Series as Baltimore lost to the Pittsburgh Pirates in seven games.

Powell had been an American League All-Star for four straight years (1968 through 1971). Before the 1972 season, the Orioles traded Frank Robinson and did not win the American League East Division for the first time since it had been created in 1969. Powell started 128 games at first base that season, hitting .252, with 21 home runs and 81 RBIs.

In 1973, Powell hit .265, but played in only 114 games, with 11 home runs and 54 RBIs, after his playing time was reduced by a sore shoulder. Powell injured his shoulder in mid-June while sliding, and aggravated the injury a number of times throughout the season; hampering his ability to play and his offensive production. The Orioles won the American League's East Division, but lost the ALCS to the A's, 3–2, with Powell only playing in one game. Orioles' manager Earl Weaver used a platoon system in 1973; and in the playoffs he did not play the left-handed hitting Powell against the A's left-handed pitchers Vida Blue and Ken Holtzman; but Weaver also did not play Powell in the decisive Game 5 against right-hander Jim "Catfish" Hunter, stating it was because of Powell's shoulder.

1973 was the first time in six seasons that Powell did not have at least 20 home runs and 80 RBIs, and he agreed to take a 20 percent pay reduction going into the 1974 season. Weaver continued to use Powell as part of a platoon system in 1974. Powell started only 94 games at first base in 1974, and hit .265 in 344 at bats, with 12 home runs and 45 RBIs. Weaver started right-handed hitting Earl Williams at first base in 43 games; Williams being principally a catcher otherwise (75 games catching in 1974). Weaver also replaced Powell for a stretch of games with a hot-hitting right-handed Enos Cabell during parts of August and September, starting Cabell in 14 games at first base. The Orioles lost the 1974 ALCS in four games to the A's, with Powell going 1-for-8 in two games.

=== Cleveland Indians and Los Angeles Dodgers ===
The Orioles' offer to sell Powell's contract to the Chicago Cubs at the Winter Meetings in early-December 1974 was rejected by Philip K. Wrigley who refused to take on Powell's $85,000 salary. Powell was eventually traded along with Don Hood to the Cleveland Indians for Dave Duncan and minor league outfielder Alvin McGrew on February 25, 1975.

Frank Robinson was Cleveland's manager at the time, and was very happy to obtain Powell. Powell, again a regular with the Indians, played in 134 games with 502 plate appearances in 1975. He batted .297 (with 129 hits) and 27 home runs (his best season since 1970). Powell had a .997 fielding percentage, which led all major league first basemen. In 1976, Powell hit only nine home runs in 95 games, with a .215 batting average. Cleveland waived Powell the following season during spring training, on March 30, 1977. Powell's final season was 1977, as a pinch-hitter for the Los Angeles Dodgers. He hit .244 with no home runs and five RBIs. He was released on August 31, 1977.

== Legacy and honors ==
Powell was named an All-Star by The Sporting News four times (1966, 1968 to 1970) and by the Associated Press twice (1966, 1970). In 1979, Powell was inducted into the Baltimore Orioles Hall of Fame. In 1983, Powell received five votes for the Hall of Fame (1.3% of all Baseball Writers' Association of America voters) in his only appearance on the ballot.

For his career, Powell hit .266, with 339 home runs and 1,187 RBIs in 2,042 games. He played 1,479 games at first base, with a career fielding percentage of .991. In 33 post-season games, he hit .262, with six home runs, 18 RBIs, 17 runs, and 12 bases on balls.

During Powell's time with the Orioles from 1961 to 1974, the team had only two seasons where they lost more games than they won. At the time his career ended with the Orioles he held the team's career home run record (303), and remains third on the Orioles' all-time home run list behind only Hall of Famers Cal Ripken Jr. and Eddie Murray (through 2026). He is fourth all-time for the Orioles in RBIs (1,063), behind only Ripken, Murray, and Hall of Fame third baseman Brooks Robinson. He is among the top-10 players all-time for the Orioles in games played, at bats, runs, hits, and bases on balls.

== In popular culture ==
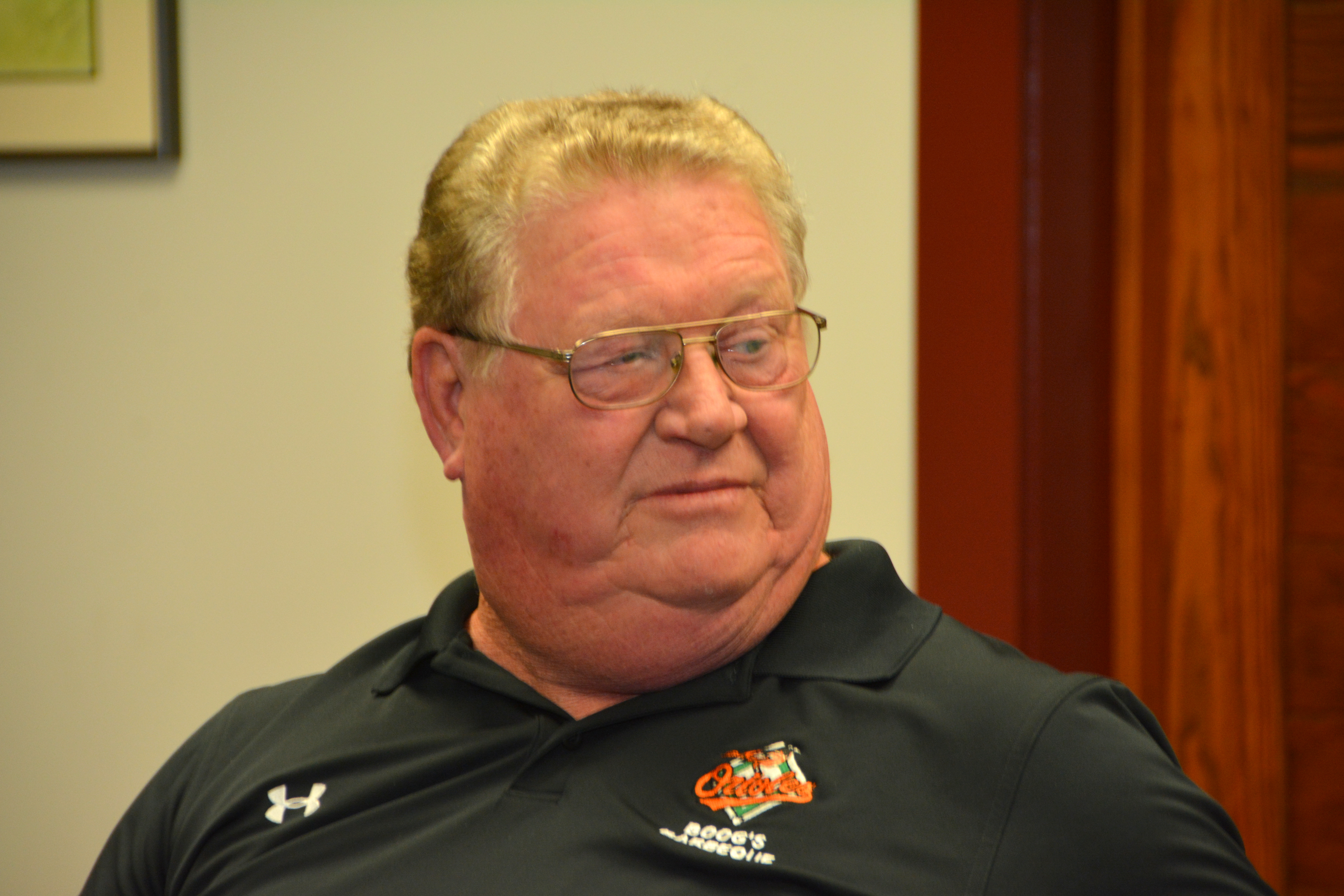
Powell at the Annapolis Book Festival in 2015

In the 1970s and 1980s Powell appeared in more than ten different television commercials for Miller Lite beer, including a memorable one with umpire Jim Honochick. Playing on the theme of mocking umpires who make bad calls, the ad featured Honochick trying unsuccessfully to read the label on a beer bottle as Powell did the voice-over. Borrowing Powell's glasses to bring the label into focus, and suddenly able to see who is standing next to him at the bar and providing the narration, Honochick exclaims, "Hey, you're Boog Powell!"

Powell is mentioned in an episode of Cheers entitled "Sam at Eleven". The fictional star of Cheers, ex-Red Sox reliever Sam Malone, relates his greatest moment in the Major Leagues: retiring Boog Powell in both games of a doubleheader.

Powell is also mentioned in an episode of Bill Burr's Netflix original show F Is for Family. While searching for his wife after having an argument, Frank Murphy drives past a batting cage and hears the crack of the bat hitting a pitch. He then quips to his daughter Maureen, "That's either your mother or Boog Powell".

Powell was very often referenced in episodes of Mystery Science Theater 3000. Example: when a giant hand bursts through a window, Servo exclaims, "Hey, it's Boog Powell!"

In Generation of Swine, Hunter S. Thompson worries his boat will be sold by Boog Powell to pay for overdue dock fees.

MLB play-by-play announcer and sportscaster Jon Sciambi acquired the nickname "Boog" early in his broadcasting career working at a radio station in Miami, when one of his co-workers said Sciambi looked like Boog Powell and taped the name Boog Powell on Sciambi's work mail slot.

== Personal life ==
Powell opened Boog's Barbecue at Camden Yards in April 1992. It was a pioneering and successful food vendor operating during Oriole games, which is still ongoing as of 2024.

In 1997, Powell was diagnosed with colon cancer, and had surgery rapidly after the diagnosis. Powell's surgery was performed by the same doctor, Keith Lillimoe, who had treated then Orioles outfielder Eric Davis for colon cancer, followed by six months of chemotherapy treatments. Powell became an advocate for early colonoscopy screening and did a series of public service announcements with Davis, who lent support to Powell after his diagnosis.

== See also ==
- List of Major League Baseball career home run leaders
- List of Major League Baseball career runs batted in leaders
