= 1970 World Series =

67th edition of Major League Baseball's championship series

Team (Wins)	Managers	Season
Baltimore Orioles (4)	Earl Weaver	108–54, .667, GA: 15
Cincinnati Reds (1)	Sparky Anderson	102–60, .630, GA: 14 1/2
- Dates: October 10–15
- Venue(s): Riverfront Stadium (Cincinnati); Memorial Stadium (Baltimore)
- MVP: Brooks Robinson (Baltimore)
- Umpires: Ken Burkhart (NL), Red Flaherty (AL), Tony Venzon (NL), Bob Stewart (AL), Billy Williams (NL), Emmett Ashford (AL)
- Hall of Famers: Orioles: Earl Weaver (manager); Jim Palmer; Brooks Robinson; Frank Robinson; Reds: Sparky Anderson (manager); Johnny Bench; Tony Pérez

Broadcast
- Television: NBC
- TV announcers: Curt Gowdy; Jim McIntyre (in Cincinnati); Chuck Thompson (in Baltimore)
- Radio: NBC
- Radio announcers: Jim Simpson; Chuck Thompson (in Cincinnati); Jim McIntyre (in Baltimore)
- ALCS: Baltimore Orioles over Minnesota Twins (3–0)
- NLCS: Cincinnati Reds over Pittsburgh Pirates (3–0)

The 1970 World Series was the championship series of Major League Baseball's (MLB) 1970 season. The 67th edition of the World Series, it was a best-of-seven playoff between the American League (AL) champion Baltimore Orioles (108–54 in the regular season) and the National League (NL) champion Cincinnati Reds (102–60). The Orioles defeated the Reds in five games for their second championship. As of 2026, this is the last time the Orioles won the World Series at home.

In this series Emmett Ashford became the first African American to umpire a World Series. It also featured the first World Series games to be played on artificial turf, as Games 1 and 2 took place at Cincinnati's first-year Riverfront Stadium.

This was the last World Series in which all games were played in the afternoon. It was also the third time in a World Series in which a team leading three games to none failed to complete the sweep by losing Game 4 but still won Game 5 to clinch the series; 1910 and 1937 were the others. It would later happen again in 2024 when the Los Angeles Dodgers failed to sweep the New York Yankees in Game 4, but won the series in Game 5. This was the last World Series until 2017 in which both participating teams won over 100 games during the regular season. This was also the first World Series to feature names on the back on both team uniforms, and the last in which teams wore wool flannel uniforms.

== Background ==
=== Baltimore Orioles ===
The Baltimore Orioles won the American League East division by 15 games over the New York Yankees. Coming into the World Series, the Orioles had won 14 straight including the final 11 during the regular season then defeated the Minnesota Twins, three games to none, in the American League Championship Series for the second straight year.

By contrast, pitching was a strength for the Baltimore Orioles as manager Earl Weaver had three, healthy 20-game winners. Mike Cuellar (24–8, 3.48 ERA), Dave McNally (24–9, 3.22) and future Hall of Famer Jim Palmer (20–10, 2.71) were all well-rested and ready for the Series. Weaver balanced good pitching with the hitting of 1970 AL MVP Boog Powell (35, 114, .297), Merv Rettenmund (18, 58, .322), as well as future Hall of Famers Frank Robinson (25, 78, .306) and Brooks Robinson (18, 94, .276). The Orioles led the AL in most runs scored (792), fewest runs allowed (574), complete games (60), lowest team ERA (3.15) and they were second in the AL in fielding percentage (.981) establishing themselves as the most dominant Orioles team in the modern era.

The 1970 World Series appearance by Baltimore was the second of what would be three-straight World Series appearances.

Of the four World Series Earl Weaver managed the Orioles to, the 1970 World Series was the only one that they won. They lost to the New York Mets in 1969, and to the Pittsburgh Pirates in 1971 and 1979.

=== Cincinnati Reds ===
The 1970 Cincinnati Reds squad was the first edition of the "Big Red Machine." Sparky Anderson's first year as a major league manager produced 102 wins and the first of four NL pennants in a seven-year stretch. They won the National League West division by 14 1/2 games over the Los Angeles Dodgers. The Reds went 32–30 in their last 62 regular season games, and swept the Pittsburgh Pirates, three games to none, in the National League Championship Series.

The Reds featured a heavy-hitting lineup that included future Hall of Famers in catcher Johnny Bench (45 home runs, 148 RBI and .293 batting average) and third baseman Tony Pérez (40, 129, .317), as well as all-time hits leader Pete Rose (15, 52, .316) in right field, NL stolen base leader Bobby Tolan (16, 80, .316) in center field and power-hitting first baseman Lee May (34, 94, .253). The Reds led the National League in batting average and finished third in runs scored. Cincinnati pitching, however, would be a weak spot throughout the Series. Two-time 20-game winner Jim Maloney could only make three starts during the regular season and was shelved with a ruptured tendon in his toe. Two 1970 All Star game representatives, Jim Merritt (20–12) and rookie Wayne Simpson (14–3), were suffering arm injuries. Merritt, who won 20 games by the end of August, pitched less than four regular season innings after September 4. Merritt started Game 5 against Baltimore, but was unable to get through the second inning. Simpson started 8–1 and had 14 wins by July 26, but was shelved thereafter. He did not pitch in the post season. Right-hander Gary Nolan (18–7, 3.26 ERA) would assume the ace role for the Reds.

The Reds would go on to amass four WS appearances in a seven-year stretch (1970, '72, '75 & '76, winning the last two).

== Summary ==
AL Baltimore Orioles (4) vs. NL Cincinnati Reds (1)

Game	Date	Score	Location	Time	Attendance
1	October 10	Baltimore Orioles – 4, Cincinnati Reds – 3	Riverfront Stadium	2:24	51,531
2	October 11	Baltimore Orioles – 6, Cincinnati Reds – 5	Riverfront Stadium	2:26	51,531
3	October 13	Cincinnati Reds – 3, Baltimore Orioles – 9	Memorial Stadium	2:09	51,773
4	October 14	Cincinnati Reds – 6, Baltimore Orioles – 5	Memorial Stadium	2:26	53,007
5	October 15	Cincinnati Reds – 3, Baltimore Orioles – 9	Memorial Stadium	2:35	45,341

== Matchups ==
=== Game 1 ===
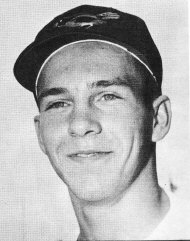
Brooks Robinson

October 10, 1970 1:00 pm (ET) at Riverfront Stadium in Cincinnati, Ohio
Team	1	2	3	4	5	6	7	8	9	R	H	E
Baltimore	0	0	0	2	1	0	1	0	0	4	7	2
Cincinnati	1	0	2	0	0	0	0	0	0	3	5	0
WP: Jim Palmer (1–0) LP: Gary Nolan (0–1) Sv: Pete Richert (1); Home runs: BAL: Boog Powell (1), Elrod Hendricks (1), Brooks Robinson (1); CIN: Lee May (1)

The Reds got off to a fast start, taking a 3–0 lead off Jim Palmer on a first-inning RBI single by Johnny Bench and a third-inning two-run homer by Lee May. The Orioles' offense answered with a two-run homer by Boog Powell in the fourth inning, off Reds starter Gary Nolan. Elrod Hendricks tied it with a homer in the fifth, and Brooks Robinson hit the game-winning homer in the seventh. In the sixth, Robinson made a spectacular backhanded grab of a hard grounder down the line by May before spinning to throw him out. It was one of several spectacular plays the Gold Glove third baseman would make in the series.

The game turned in the sixth inning on a controversial call by home-plate umpire Ken Burkhart. The Reds had Bernie Carbo on third and Tommy Helms on first when Ty Cline, batting for Woody Woodward, hit a high chopper in front of the plate. Burkhart positioned himself in front of the plate to call the ball fair or foul as Carbo sped home. Baltimore catcher Hendricks fielded the ball and turned to tag Carbo with Burkhart blocking the way. Hendricks tagged the sliding Carbo with his glove hand while holding the ball in his bare right hand; all the while, Burkhart was knocked to the ground and had his back to the play. When Burkhart turned around, he saw Carbo out of the baseline because Burkhart was actually blocking Carbo's direct path to the plate as Hendricks held the ball. Burkhart signaled Carbo out without asking for help from the other umpires. Replays showed that Hendricks tagged Carbo with an empty mitt, but Carbo also missed the plate on the slide, although, unwittingly, he stood on it when he argued the "out" call. Both Carbo and Sparky Anderson vehemently argued the call, to no avail.

Robinson's home run put the O's ahead for the first time, while Palmer settled into a groove on the mound. Palmer allowed no hits in his final 2 2/3 innings of work. After he walked Pete Rose with two outs in the ninth, Pete Richert relieved Palmer and got Bobby Tolan to line out to shortstop Mark Belanger to end the game.

The Jackson 5 performed "The Star-Spangled Banner" prior to the game, with the Lemon-Monroe High School Marching Band accompanying the group in the performance. The events were re-enacted in the 1992 miniseries The Jacksons: An American Dream, with the group performing the song a cappella.

=== Game 2 ===
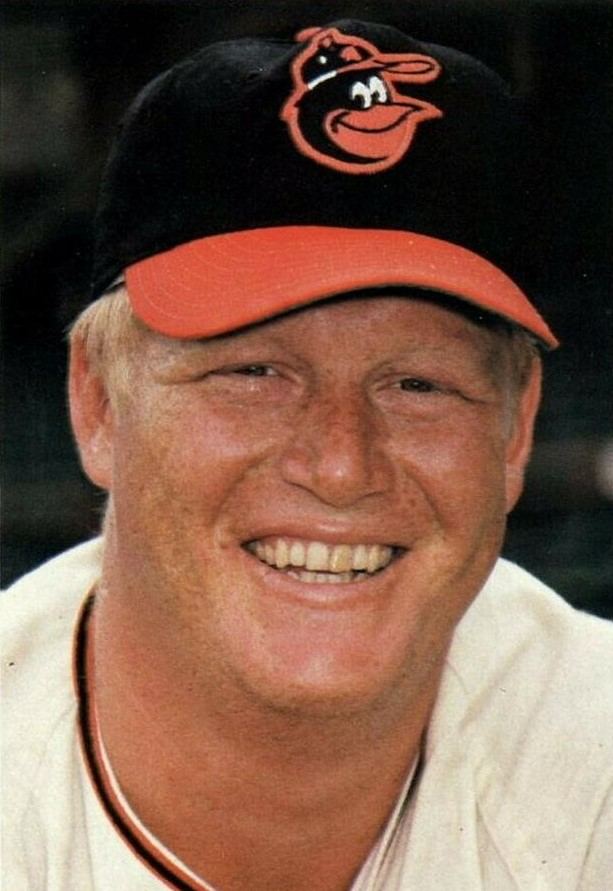
Boog Powell

October 11, 1970 1:00 pm (ET) at Riverfront Stadium in Cincinnati, Ohio
Team	1	2	3	4	5	6	7	8	9	R	H	E
Baltimore	0	0	0	1	5	0	0	0	0	6	10	2
Cincinnati	3	0	1	0	0	1	0	0	0	5	7	0
WP: Tom Phoebus (1–0) LP: Milt Wilcox (0–1) Sv: Dick Hall (1); Home runs: BAL: Boog Powell (2); CIN: Bobby Tolan (1), Johnny Bench (1)

Again, another fast start by the Reds fell by the wayside. The Reds scored three in the first on a two-run double by Lee May, who went to third when Orioles center fielder Paul Blair bobbled the ball. Hal McRae squeeze-bunted May home for the third run. They pushed the lead to 4–0 on a homer by Bobby Tolan in the third.

The Orioles began their comeback innocently enough on a Boog Powell solo homer in the fourth. In the fifth, the floodgates opened. With one out, Reds' starter Jim McGlothlin gave up successive singles to pinch-hitter Chico Salmon and Don Buford. Paul Blair singled home Salmon, chasing McGlothlin and bringing in Milt Wilcox. Wilcox gave up RBI singles to Powell and Brooks Robinson and the crushing blow, a two-run double to Elrod Hendricks.

The Reds would get back one run in the sixth on a Johnny Bench home run, but that was it.

American actor and singer Tony Martin sang the National Anthem prior to the first pitch, which was thrown out by former NL President Warren Giles.

=== Game 3 ===
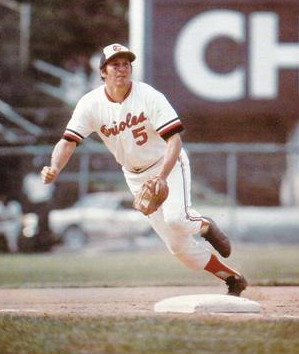
Brooks Robinson

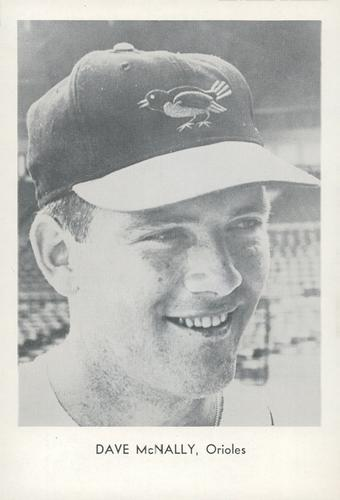
Dave McNally

October 13, 1970 1:00 pm (ET) at Memorial Stadium in Baltimore, Maryland
Team	1	2	3	4	5	6	7	8	9	R	H	E
Cincinnati	0	1	0	0	0	0	2	0	0	3	9	0
Baltimore	2	0	1	0	1	4	1	0	X	9	10	1
WP: Dave McNally (1–0) LP: Tony Cloninger (0–1); Home runs: CIN: None; BAL: Frank Robinson (1), Don Buford (1), Dave McNally (1)

Left-hander Dave McNally had a banner day, pitching a complete game and scattering nine hits, while also connecting for a grand slam in the sixth inning off reliever Wayne Granger to break the game open. McNally became the first pitcher to hit a World Series grand slam.

Baltimore third baseman Brooks Robinson added to his highlight reel with a spectacular display of fielding. After Pete Rose and Bobby Tolan led the game off with consecutive hits, Robinson made a sensational, leaping grab of Tony Pérez's hopper, stepped on third and fired to first for a double play. In the second inning, Robinson snagged a slow grounder hit by Tommy Helms and threw out the sprinting second baseman. And in the sixth, Robinson made a diving catch of a line drive by Johnny Bench. The Memorial Stadium fans gave Robinson a standing ovation as he came to bat in the bottom of the sixth. He responded by doubling to left.

The Orioles got two runs in the first on Brooks Robinson's bases-loaded double off of Tony Cloninger. The Reds cut it to 2–1 in the second when Hal McRae singled, moved to second on a groundout and scored on Dave Concepcion's single, but Frank Robinson's home run in the third gave the Orioles that run back. Don Buford's home run in the fifth extended their lead to 4–1. Next inning Dave McNally's grand slam off of Wayne Granger blew the game open and put the Orioles up 8–1. The Reds got two runs in the seventh on Dave Concepcion's sacrifice fly and Pete Rose's RBI single, but the Orioles got a run in the bottom half on Paul Blair's RBI double off of Don Gullett. The Orioles took a commanding 3–0 series lead with a 9–3 win.

=== Game 4 ===
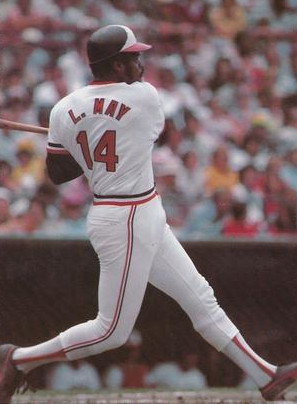
Lee May

October 14, 1970 1:00 pm (ET) at Memorial Stadium in Baltimore, Maryland
Team	1	2	3	4	5	6	7	8	9	R	H	E
Cincinnati	0	1	1	0	1	0	0	3	0	6	8	3
Baltimore	0	1	3	0	0	1	0	0	0	5	8	0
WP: Clay Carroll (1–0) LP: Eddie Watt (0–1); Home runs: CIN: Pete Rose (1), Lee May (2); BAL: Brooks Robinson (2)

The Reds staved off a Series sweep thanks to clutch hitting by Lee May and stellar relief pitching by rookie Don Gullett and veteran Clay Carroll.

With a 2–1 lead in the third, Reds' starter Gary Nolan gave up two-out RBI singles to Frank Robinson and Brooks Robinson. Gullett relieved Nolan and surrendered another RBI single to Elrod Hendricks. The Reds crept back in the fifth on a homer by Pete Rose.

Gullett gave up an unearned run in the sixth when Hendricks singled Brooks Robinson to third and Robinson scored when Rose's attempted throw from right field sailed past Tony Pérez at third.

In the eighth, Perez walked and Johnny Bench singled off Baltimore starter Jim Palmer, who was then relieved by Eddie Watt. Lee May then slammed a three-run homer on the first pitch he saw from Watt to put the Reds ahead. Carroll, who had entered in the seventh, made the lead stand. Gullett and Carroll combined to pitch 6 1/3 innings, allowing four hits and one unearned run. The Reds' victory snapped Baltimore's 17-game winning streak which included the final 11 regular-season games and a three-game sweep over Minnesota in the ALCS. It also ended Cincinnati's six-game World Series losing streak, including the last three games in the 1961 World Series.

=== Game 5 ===
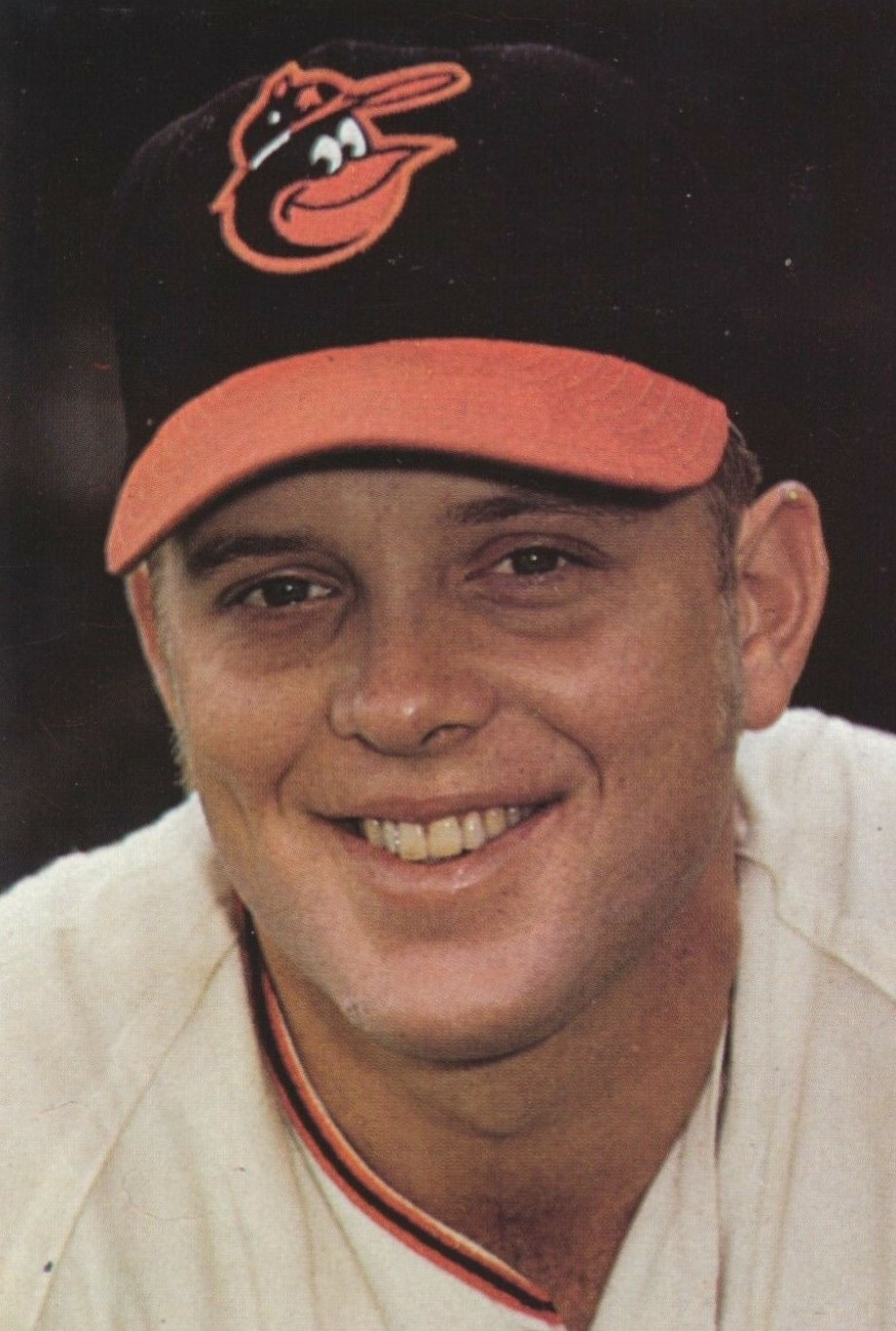
Merv Rettenmund

October 15, 1970 1:00 pm (ET) at Memorial Stadium in Baltimore, Maryland
Team	1	2	3	4	5	6	7	8	9	R	H	E
Cincinnati	3	0	0	0	0	0	0	0	0	3	6	0
Baltimore	2	2	2	0	1	0	0	2	X	9	15	0
WP: Mike Cuellar (1–0) LP: Jim Merritt (0–1); Home runs: CIN: None; BAL: Frank Robinson (2), Merv Rettenmund (1)

Rain showers threatened to delay Game 5, but it kept the Memorial Stadium crowd from being less than capacity. Seemingly re-energized from their Game 4 win, the Reds rocked Orioles starter Mike Cuellar for three runs in the first on an RBI single by Johnny Bench and a two-run double by Hal McRae. Cuellar stayed in the game and got Tommy Helms to ground out to Mark Belanger for the final out. The Orioles scored two runs in the bottom of the first against Reds' 20-game winner Jim Merritt, who had been battling a sore arm and had not pitched in 10 days. Merritt allowed two more runs in the second inning before being lifted.

Frank Robinson hit a two-run home run, Merv Rettenmund also had a homer and two RBI, and Davey Johnson had two RBI to pace the Orioles' attack. After the rocky first inning, Cuellar settled down and allowed no runs and two hits in the final eight innings for a complete-game victory.

Brooks Robinson won the World Series Most Valuable Player Award hitting .429, broke the record for total bases in a five-game series with 17, tied the record for most hits in one game with four, and tied teammate Paul Blair for most hits in a five-game Series with nine. Total Baseball described Brooks Robinson's fielding with, "other-worldly defense at third (which) gave Reds right-handed hitters nightmares through the Series." Upon hearing that Robinson won the MVP award and a new car from Toyota, Reds' catcher Johnny Bench said, "If we had known he wanted a car that badly, we'd all have chipped in and bought him one."

The victory was redemption for Baltimore, who had lost to the underdog New York Mets in the 1969 World Series.

The game was the last in the majors for Ashford, who became the first black umpire to work at the top level of baseball, when he was hired by the American League in 1966. Ashford reached MLB's then-mandatory retirement age of 55 in late 1969, but was allowed by AL president Joe Cronin to come back for 1970, giving him the opportunity to break the World Series color barrier for umpires. A black umpire did not call balls and strikes in a World Series game until 1993, when the NL's Charlie Williams worked the plate in Game 4.

This World Series was the first in which both teams wore their last names on the backs of their uniforms. It was also the last where either team wore wool flannel uniforms. The Orioles gradually switched to double-unit uniforms throughout 1971, then went to them full-time in the American League Championship Series; their World Series opponents, the Pittsburgh Pirates, were the first team to don double-knits when they moved to Three Rivers Stadium in July 1970. The Reds, along with 15 other teams, moved from flannels to knits to start 1972.

=== Composite line score ===
1970 World Series (4–1): Baltimore Orioles (A.L.) over Cincinnati Reds (N.L.)

Team	1	2	3	4	5	6	7	8	9	R	H	E
Baltimore Orioles	4	3	6	3	8	5	2	2	0	33	50	5
Cincinnati Reds	7	2	4	0	1	1	2	3	0	20	35	3
Total attendance: 253,183 Average attendance: 50,637; Winning player's share: $18,216 Losing player's share: $13,688

== Aftermath ==
This was the second of three consecutive appearances by the Orioles, who went on to lose the following year's World Series to the Pittsburgh Pirates in seven games. Baltimore won both the Super Bowl and the World Series in the same season as the Baltimore Colts won Super Bowl V over the Dallas Cowboys. However, the city fell short of winning MLB, NFL and NBA championships within a one-year span as the Baltimore Bullets were swept by the Milwaukee Bucks in the 1971 NBA Finals. Such a scenario is now unlikely as the Bullets have since relocated to Washington, D.C. and renamed the Wizards. As of 2026, this is the most recent championship won by a Baltimore-based team at their home venue, as the Orioles’ most recent World Series championship in 1983, which they won over the Philadelphia Phillies in five games, was won on the road, and the Baltimore Ravens’ two Super Bowl victories in 2001 and 2013 were won at neutral sites per NFL rules.

For the Reds, this was the first of four World Series appearances in the 1970s. After losing to the Oakland Athletics four games to three in 1972, they proceeded to win back-to-back championships in 1975 (4–3 vs. the Red Sox) and 1976 (4–0 vs. the Yankees).

Not until the 2024 World Series did a team down 3-0 in the series won Game 4 to avoid a sweep. Between 1970-2024, all nine teams that went up 3-0 in the World Series would finish off the sweep the next game.

== See also ==
- 1970 Japan Series

== Bibliography ==
- Cohen, Richard M.; Neft, David S. (1990). The World Series: Complete Play-By-Play of Every Game, 1903–1989. New York: St. Martin's Press. pp. 330–334. ISBN 0-312-03960-3.
- Reichler, Joseph (1982). The Baseball Encyclopedia (5th ed.). Macmillan Publishing. p. 2182. ISBN 0-02-579010-2.
- Forman, Sean L. "1970 World Series". Baseball-Reference.com – Major League Statistics and Information. Archived from the original on December 17, 2007.
