= Earl Weaver =

American baseball manager (1930–2013)

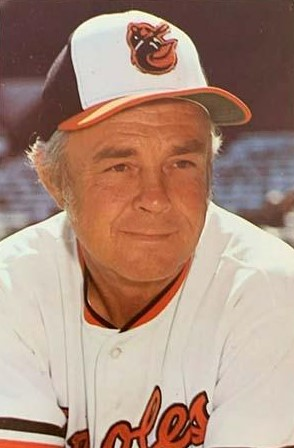
- Weaver in 1976
- Manager
- Born: August 14, 1930; St. Louis, Missouri, U.S.
- Died: January 19, 2013 (aged 82); Aboard Celebrity Silhouette, Caribbean Sea
- Batted: Right Threw: Right

MLB debut
- July 7, 1968, for the Baltimore Orioles

Last MLB appearance
- October 5, 1986, for the Baltimore Orioles

MLB statistics
- Games managed: 2,540
- Managerial record: 1,480–1,060–1
- Winning %: .583
- Stats at Baseball Reference
- Managerial record at Baseball Reference

Teams
- Baltimore Orioles (1968–1982, 1985–1986)

Career highlights and awards
- World Series champion (1970); Baltimore Orioles No. 4 retired; Baltimore Orioles Hall of Fame

Member of the National

Baseball Hall of Fame
- Induction: 1996
- Election method: Veterans Committee

Earl Sidney Weaver (August 14, 1930 – January 19, 2013) was an American professional baseball manager, author, and television color commentator. Weaver played in minor league baseball as a second baseman from 1948 to 1960. In 1956, he began his managerial career, serving as a player–manager for five seasons before he stopped playing to concentrate on managing, without ever having played in Major League Baseball (MLB). He progressed through the minor league system before going on to become a manager in the Major Leagues with the Baltimore Orioles in two separate stints (1968–1982, 1985–1986), winning a World Series championship in 1970.

A fiery manager that was famously quoted as having a philosophy of "pitching, defense, and the three-run homer", Weaver had just one losing season in 15 full seasons as a manager that oversaw six playoff appearances with four American League pennants, which included three in a row from 1969 to 1971 with 100-win seasons each time. He was a three-time Manager of the Year. In 1996, he was inducted into the Baseball Hall of Fame.

== Early life ==
Weaver was born on August 14, 1930, in St. Louis, Missouri. He was the son of Earl Milton Weaver, a dry cleaner who cleaned the uniforms of the St. Louis Cardinals and Browns (who would later become the Baltimore Orioles), and Ethel Genevieve Wakefield. Baseball Hall of Fame pitcher Jim Palmer, who pitched under Weaver for 14 seasons in the major leagues, wrote that his manager was "brought up in St. Louis on the bad side of a street where even the good side isn't too good." The Weavers lived in a crowded section of St. Louis, within a mile of Sportsman's Park, home to the Cardinals and Browns. As a child Weaver accompanied his father into the team's clubhouse to make pickups and deliveries of their uniforms.

Weaver was an avid baseball fan. His baseball hero was Cardinals' shortstop Leo Durocher, who would go on to become a Hall of Fame manager. He was fascinated with managers and studied them carefully, even as an adolescent and teenager. Among the managers he studied was Cardinals skipper and future Hall of Famer Billy Southworth (1940–45), whose teams won at least 105 games each season from 1942 to 1944. The next team to win over 100 games three consecutive years would be Weaver's Baltimore Orioles (1969–71).

In his teens, Weaver was a three-sport athlete at at Beaumont High School in St. Louis, also playing for its state championship basketball team and serving as a co-captain of its football team. He played on his father's St. Louis city league baseball team that went 53-2 and won three city titles and also played four years of American Legion baseball in St. Louis.

== Playing career ==
The St. Louis Cardinals signed the 17-year-old Weaver in 1948 as a second baseman. Playing for the Class D West Frankfurt Cardinals in 1948, he had a .268 batting average, with 92 bases on balls and 96 runs scored and only 24 strikeouts. He was named an All-Star. Playing for the Class C level St. Joseph Cardinals in 1949, his average improved to .282, with an on-base percentage of .382, 75 bases on balls, 101 runs batted in (RBI), 80 runs scored and 17 stolen bases. In 1950, he hit .276 playing Class B baseball for the Winston-Salem Cardinals of the Carolina League; though he had been hitting around .300 before a thumb injury. In 1951, he hit .279 with the Single-A Omaha Cardinals, and was again an All-star. He was known for his defensive ability and aggressive style of play. However, he did not hit with power, lacked speed, and had a weak throwing arm overall.

Weaver's opportunity to make the St. Louis Cardinals major league roster came in the Cardinals' spring training of 1952 when he was part of the team's 40-man roster. He performed well and many believed he could make the team as a backup second baseman. But his competition for backup second baseman was the Cardinals new manager, 35-year old Eddie Stanky, who had final decision making authority over who made the Cardinals final roster. Stanky ultimately chose himself over Weaver. Weaver became dispirited, falling into drink and depression. He spent the next nine seasons in the minor leagues, serving as a player-manager from 1956 to 1960.

Following the 1953 season, his rights were sold to the Denver Bears in the Pittsburgh Pirates organization. In 1956, he played for the independent Montgomery Rebels. By 1957, he was in the Orioles farm system.

== Managerial career ==
Two of Weaver's minor league managers influenced his own future as a manager: George Kissell at Winston-Salem and Andy Cohen in Denver. Kissell had worked with Branch Rickey in building the Cardinals' farm system and influenced the club's style of play. Cohen, who taught Weaver about the psychology of handling players, had played under Hall of Fame manager John McGraw. Weaver considered Kissell and Orioles manager Paul Richards to be his greatest managerial influences. In addition to Weaver, Kissell was a mentor to Hall of Fame managers Sparky Anderson, Joe Torre, and Tony La Russa.

=== Minor leagues ===
Weaver started his managerial career in 1956 with the unaffiliated Knoxville Smokies in the South Atlantic League. Baltimore Orioles' assistant farm system director Harry Dalton recommended to farm system director Jim McLaughlin that the Orioles consider Weaver as a potential manager for the Orioles' farm system. McLaughlin had seen Weaver play in high school, when McLaughlin held the same farm system position with the St. Louis Browns. McLaughlin sent Orioles' scout Jim Russo to observe Weaver managing in Knoxville. Russo only attended one game, and appreciated what he saw in Weaver; but he could not evaluate Weaver from observing a single game. Russo told McLaughlin that McLaughlin already knew about Weaver's determination and leadership qualities or he would not have bothered to send Russo, and McLaughlin decided to hire Weaver as a manager in the Orioles' farm system.

Weaver joined the Orioles in 1957 as player-manager of their Fitzgerald, Georgia club in the Class D Georgia–Florida League, finishing the season with a 65–74 record. In 1958, the Orioles' team in the Georgia-Florida League was now in Dublin, Georgia, and retained Weaver as player-manager; finishing the season 72–56. In 1959, the Orioles' moved Weaver up to manage the Class C Aberdeen (South Dakota) Pheasants of the Northern League. The Pheasants had a 69–55 record under Weaver, with Weaver still appearing in 13 games as a player.

In 1960, Weaver was promoted to manage the Class B Fox Cities Foxes in Appleton, Wisconsin, in the Three-I League (still as a player-manager). The team came in first place, with an 82–56 record. His players included future Orioles star Boog Powell, future Orioles manager Cal Ripken Sr., future Orioles and Hall of Fame general manager Pat Gillick, and future major leaguers Dean Chance and Pete Ward. He managed the Foxes again in 1961, as a full-time manager only. Weaver also became the director of the Orioles' minor league spring training camp in Thomasville, Georgia in 1961.

He was advanced to the Elmira Pioneers in 1962, part of the Single-A Eastern League. His players that season included, among others, future Baltimore Orioles starters Mark Belanger, Andy Etchebarren, and Dave McNally; and future 16-year Major League pitcher Darrold Knowles. Weaver coached at Elmira for three more years in the Eastern League (1963 to 1965), which had become a Double-A level league during those three years.

In 1963, Weaver managed future Orioles player and manager Davey Johnson, as well as Curt Blefary and Tom Phoebus, in addition to Knowles. Knowles was the Pioneers' best pitcher that season, with a 16–7 record and 2.73 earned run average (ERA). Years later, Weaver told Knowles that Knowles' success under Weaver that season was one of the reasons Weaver made it to the major leagues.

In 1964, Elmira had an 82–58 record under Weaver, finishing in first place in the Eastern League. His players now included future Orioles' gold glove center fielder Paul Blair and future Orioles' relief pitcher Eddie Watt. Weaver was named Eastern League Manager of the Year. In 1965, the Pioneers were 83–55, finishing in second place in the Eastern League, one game from first place.

In 1966, Weaver was promoted to the Triple-A Rochester Red Wings of the International League. The team had an 83–64 record, and finished the season in first place, losing in the playoffs to the Richmond Braves. Under Weaver in 1967, the Red Wings finished the season 80–60, tied with the Richmond Braves for first place. The Braves defeated the Red Wings in a one-game playoff for first place. The Columbus Jets then defeated the Red Wings in the playoffs that season.

Weaver was very popular among Rochester's fans during his two years there, both because of the team's success, and his frequent arguments with umpires (who ejected him 21 times in two years). The team's owner appreciated Weaver because he improved attendance and made the team financially viable. At the end of the 1967 season, the Orioles awarded Weaver their Fred Hofmann Award for his service in their minor league system. Weaver was not so popular among his players, however, as he could be harsh and demanding; but this was not a primary concern to Weaver so long as they played up to his standards and his teams were winning.

In eleven minor league seasons as a manager, he compiled a record of 884 wins and 760 defeats (.538).

==== Steve Dalkowski ====
Weaver also managed pitcher Steve Dalkowski in 1959 at Aberdeen and from 1962 to 1964 at Elmira. Dalkowski holds a significant place in baseball history because of the extraordinary velocity of his fastball when compared to all other pitchers to have ever played baseball; with debate over whether he threw the hardest fastball in baseball history. Dalkowski never played Major League Baseball, however, in significant part because of an equally extraordinary lack of control over his pitches during much of his career. Dalkowski had seasons where he would walk more batters than he would strike out in a season, and he would throw wild pitches that were far from home plate. In 1959 under Weaver, Dalkowski struck out 99 batters in 59 innings, but also walked 110 batters and had 13 wild pitches. He pitched the only no-hitter of his career under Weaver that year, with 21 strikeouts and eight walks in that game. Weaver considered Dalkowski the fastest pitcher he ever saw.

It has been reported that in 1962, the Orioles under Paul Richards had all of the players in their organization take an IQ test, and it was discovered that Dalkowski had a lower than normal IQ. In another telling, it was Weaver who had Dalkowski take an intelligence test along with the team's most intelligent player (Mickey McGuire), for comparison, and Dalkowski scored in the lowest percentile. Weaver concluded that Dalkowski's pitching control difficulties arose because of a limited mental capacity. Weaver simplified the game for Dalkowski by (1) reducing his pitching repertoire to a fastball and slider, and (2) telling Dalkowski to simply throw his fastball down the middle of home plate every time. Weaver was not worried if Dalkowski's fastball crossed the plate at a location that would normally allow a batter to hit the ball, because Dalkowski's fastball was typically unhittable. Weaver also believed that if Dalkowski missed the middle of home plate, he still might end up throwing it on the corners of the plate for a strike anyway.

Under Weaver's plan, Dalkowski had a breakthrough season in 1962, with career-bests in complete games and ERA. He also walked less than one batter an inning for the first time in his career (6.4 walks per nine innings), after averaging 17.1 walks per nine innings just a year earlier. His 3.04 ERA was over two runs lower than his previous best. In an extra-inning game that year, Dalkowski recorded 27 strikeouts (while walking 16 and throwing 283 pitches). Dalkowski was invited to spring training with the Orioles in 1963, and the Orioles were planning to give him an opportunity to play for them, but Dalkowski suffered a career-altering arm injury pitching that spring. The velocity on his fastball dropped significantly and his career ended after two more minor league seasons (1964 and 1965) playing in the Orioles', Pittsburgh Pirates' and Los Angeles Angels' farm systems. The Sporting News article reporting the end of Dalkowski's career was entitled "Living Legend Released".

Dalkowski himself said that Baltimore Orioles' pitching coach Harry Brecheen made adjustments to Dalkowski's pitching motion in 1962, by teaching Dalkowski not to throw across his body, and this improved his control. Dalkowski said of his pitching motion before this alteration, "I hit my left elbow on my right knee so often, they finally made me a pad to wear".

=== Baltimore Orioles ===
The Orioles had won the 1966 World Series under manager Hank Bauer, but had fallen to sixth place in 1967. Harry Dalton, now the head of Orioles' baseball operations, wanted Weaver to replace Bauer for the 1968 season, but Orioles' owner Jerold Hoffberger was reluctant to fire Bauer since Bauer still had to be paid in 1968. The Orioles re-signed Bauer in late September 1967, but fired pitching coach Harry Brecheen, first base coach Gene Woodling, and coach Sherm Lollar. Bauer's position remained tenuous going into the 1968 season. Shortly after re-signing Bauer, the Orioles offered Weaver the first-base coaching job. It was understood at the time that if the team did not improve in 1968 under Bauer, then Weaver would replace Bauer. Although the move from Rochester was presented as an offer to Weaver, he understood that this was something the Orioles and Dalton expected of him, and he was excited about finally reaching the major leagues.

Weaver formally replaced Woodling as the Orioles' first-base coach at the beginning of October 1967. On Weaver's recommendation to Dalton, George Bamberger replaced Brecheen as the team's pitching coach; holding that position with the Orioles from 1968 to 1977. Bauer was under pressure to succeed or be fired under this arrangement, with Weaver's presence constantly looming over him. Weaver was concerned about his presence potentially becoming divisive on the Orioles.

Weaver spent the first 80 games of the 1968 season as the Orioles' first base coach, going into the 1968 All-Star break (July 8 to 10). Bauer was fired on July 10, and Weaver succeeded Bauer as manager on July 11, to start the second half of the 1968 season. At the time, the Orioles had a 43–37 record and were in third place, 10½ games behind the first place Detroit Tigers. The Orioles finished the season with a record 48–34 under Weaver, ending in second place behind the 103–59 Tigers, who went on to win the 1968 World Series.

Weaver's contract was for one year, and he would continue to work under one-year contracts throughout his tenure with the team. During his time managing the Orioles from 1969 to 1982, he had a record of 1,306 wins to 885 losses; a .596 winning percentage. No team in Major League Baseball was within 70 wins of Weaver's total during that time. 1969 was the first year the American and National Leagues were split into two divisions, and held divisional playoffs to determine what teams would advance to the World Series. From 1969 to 1982, Weaver's Orioles won a World Series (1970) and four American League championships (1969, 1970, 1971 and 1979). The Orioles were also American League Eastern Division champions in 1973 (losing three games to two against eventual World Series Champion Oakland Athletics in the 1973 playoffs) and in 1974 (losing three games to one against the Athletics in the 1974 playoffs, who again won the World Series). Weaver's teams during this period won 100 games or more in a single season five times (109/1969, 108/1970, 102/1979, 101/1971 and 100/1980); won 90 or more games 11 times; and finished in second place six times.

The Associated Press selected Weaver as Manager of the Year three times (1973, 1977, 1979). The Sporting News named him American League Manager of the Year twice (1977, 1979).

==== 1969–1971 ====
In 1969, the Orioles were defeated in the World Series in five games by the New York Mets team known as the Miracle Mets. He was ejected in Game 4 of that series by umpire Shag Crawford for arguing balls and strikes. In 1970, the Orioles won the World Series by defeating the Cincinnati Reds (The "Big Red Machine") in five games. In 1971, the Orioles had four 20-game winners, swept the Oakland Athletics in the playoffs, but lost the World Series in seven games to the Pittsburgh Pirates.

==== Blair house rebellion ====
Before the 1972 season, the Orioles traded 36-year old team leader Frank Robinson, though they added rising stars Don Baylor and Bobby Grich. They had just one 20-game winner in 1972 (Jim Palmer) and missed the playoffs for the first time since Weaver became a full-time manager. The Orioles would return to the playoffs in 1973, losing to the Oakland Athletics in the American League Championship Series, 3–2.

Weaver had a particular preference for scoring via three-run home runs, which Palmer would later call "a great plan if you have Boog Powells and Frank Robinsons and Brooks Robinsons." Even so, in 1974, the club hit just 116 total home runs, with Powell and Robinson combining for 19. With the team eight games behind the Red Sox in late August, the Orioles held a secret player's-only meeting at gold glove center fielder Paul Blair's house.

Their new strategy, according to Palmer, was to "squeeze every hit and every base and every run you can out of every play." To accomplish this goal, the players came up with secret signs they would use in games. The new strategy worked, as Baltimore overcame the deficit to clinch the division at the end of the year. According to Brooks Robinson, "It took Earl about three or four games to finally figure out what the heck we were doing in that situation, and I think he ended up saying, 'well, you'd better be right.'...It worked out well. And Earl loved us all, anyway." The Orioles would finish first in the American League East but go on to lose to the A's in the ALCS.

==== 1975–81 ====
With the advent of free agency, the Orioles won just one division title, in 1979, from 1975 to 1981.

Weaver's 1,000th career managerial victory was a 5–3 Opening Day result over the Chicago White Sox at Memorial Stadium on April 6, 1979. That year, Weaver used 140 different lineups during the regular season, but the Orioles still reached the World Series again, this time losing in seven games to the Pittsburgh Pirates. He expressed plans to retire following the 1982 season prior to Game 6 of that World Series on October 16. He had originally targeted the expiration of his contract upon the conclusion of the 1980 campaign to step away from the sport.

==== Cal Ripken Jr. and the modern shortstop ====
In 1981, future Hall of Famer Cal Ripken Jr. joined the Orioles from the Orioles minor league system. Ripken's father, Cal Sr., had been a long time player, coach and manager in the Orioles farm system, and Weaver had known Ripken Jr. his entire life. Weaver had seen Ripken play shortstop as early as high school, knew Ripken was an excellent fielder as a shortstop, and saw shortstop as Ripken's best position on the Orioles. However, general manager Hank Peters insisted the 6 ft 4 in (1.93 m) 210 lb (99.4 kg) Ripken should play third base, as Ripken did not fit the prototypical lithe light-hitting, or at least non-power hitting, shortstop model of the time. In 1982, even after Peters had traded away Doug DeCinces to make room for Ripken at third base, Weaver moved Ripken to shortstop, where he went on to be named Rookie of the Year, and redefined the position to open the way for future power hitting shortstops.

==== 1982 and first retirement ====
In 1982, Weaver announced he would retire at the end of the season. The Orioles played poorly for the first half of the year before climbing in the standings to just three games behind, going into a season-ending four-game series against the division-leading Brewers at Memorial Stadium. The Orioles beat them handily in the first three games to pull into a first-place tie. The final game of the series, and the season, on October 3, would decide the AL East title. Televised nationally on ABC, the Orioles suffered a crushing 10–2 loss. After the game, the crowd called for Weaver to come out. This tribute to the retiring Weaver provided intense emotion against the backdrop of the season-ending defeat, as Weaver, in tears, stood on the field and applauded back to the fans, and shared words and an embrace with Brewers manager Harvey Kuenn. Joe Altobelli was appointed his successor on November 12, 1982.

==== Second managerial stint ====
Weaver finished his first stint as manager of the Orioles with a .596 winning percentage, never having had a losing season. The year following Weaver's retirement, Baltimore won the World Series under Altobelli, about which Palmer wrote, "we won with a team Earl put together."

Owner Edward Bennett Williams coaxed Weaver out of retirement midway through the 1985 season, but he retired for good after the 1986 season, the only full losing season of his major league career (73–89). Weaver's total major league managerial record is 1,480–1,060 (.583), including 100+ win seasons in 1969–71, 1979, and 1980. Weaver averaged 94.3 managerial wins per season, an all-time record at the time of his death.

In 1989, Weaver managed the Gold Coast Suns in the new Senior Professional Baseball Association. Less than a week into the season, Weaver was ejected from his first game. He later commented, "These umpires are high school rejects. The league went for the cheapest umpiring association. There should be no league if this continues." The Suns failed to make the playoffs in the 1989–90 season and folded after one season.

=== Disciplinary actions ===
Weaver was notorious for his conflicts with umpires and is estimated to have been ejected from 96 regular-season games, the fourth-most all-time according to Baseball Reference. He was ejected from both games in a doubleheader on three occasions and was twice ejected from games before they even started, both times by Ron Luciano. Luciano alone ejected him from all four games of a minor-league series and eight games in the majors. Sometimes, even after Weaver had been thrown out of a game, he would phone the Oriole dugout to tell the coaches what moves to make.

He was well known for the humor that often accompanied his ejections. During one particular tirade with an umpire, Weaver headed to the dugout screaming, "I'm going to check the rule-book on that" to which the umpire replied, "Here, use mine." Weaver shot back, "That's no good—I can't read Braille." He once told an umpire that he could appear on What's My Line? wearing his mask, chest protector, holding his ball/strike indicator and still nobody would guess he was an umpire.

Weaver had a penchant for kicking dirt on umpires, and for turning his cap backwards whenever he sparred with umpires in order to get as close to them as possible without actually touching them. His rivalry with Luciano was legendary, leading to the AL rearranging umpiring schedules for an entire year so that Luciano would not work Orioles games. Weaver would later publicly question Luciano's "integrity" after an August 26, 1979, ejection, for which he received a three-game suspension. Weaver once derisively called Luciano "one of the few umpires that people have paid their way into the park to see."

Marty Springstead was one of Weaver's least favorite umpires. On September 15, 1977, Weaver asked Springstead to have a tarpaulin covering the Toronto Blue Jays bullpen area removed; the tarp was weighted down by bricks and Earl argued his left fielder could be injured if he ran into the bricks while chasing a foul ball. When the umpire refused to order the Blue Jays to move the tarp, Weaver pulled the Orioles off the field. The umpire declared the move a forfeit, still the only one in Orioles history. On another occasion, in Cleveland, Weaver stormed to the dugout and returned to the field with a rulebook in his pocket. "Don't take that book out or you're outta here," Springstead warned. Weaver pulled it out anyway and was ejected. After that game, Weaver said of Springstead, "He's a terrific guy... he's just not a very good umpire."

One of Weaver's most infamous tirades came on September 17, 1980, in a game against the Detroit Tigers. First base umpire Bill Haller, who was wearing a microphone for a PM Magazine documentary on the daily life of an MLB umpire, called a balk on Oriole pitcher Mike Flanagan. Weaver charged out of the dugout and began screaming at Haller, who was already angry at Weaver for publicly questioning his integrity because his brother was the Tigers' backup catcher at the time. After Weaver was ejected, he launched into a profanity-filled argument in which he accused Haller of blatantly calling the game in the Tigers' favor. He also accused Haller of poking him in the chest, which Weaver demands that if he does it again, he'll "knock Haller right in his nose", and after Haller denied doing so, they called each other liars. Weaver's contempt for umpires was often mutual; one night in 1973, Weaver threw his cap to the ground and began a vehement argument with Luciano. Luciano's crew-mate Don Denkinger walked over to Weaver's cap, stepped on it with the sharp cleats of both shoes, and slowly twisted back and forth.

=== Philosophy ===
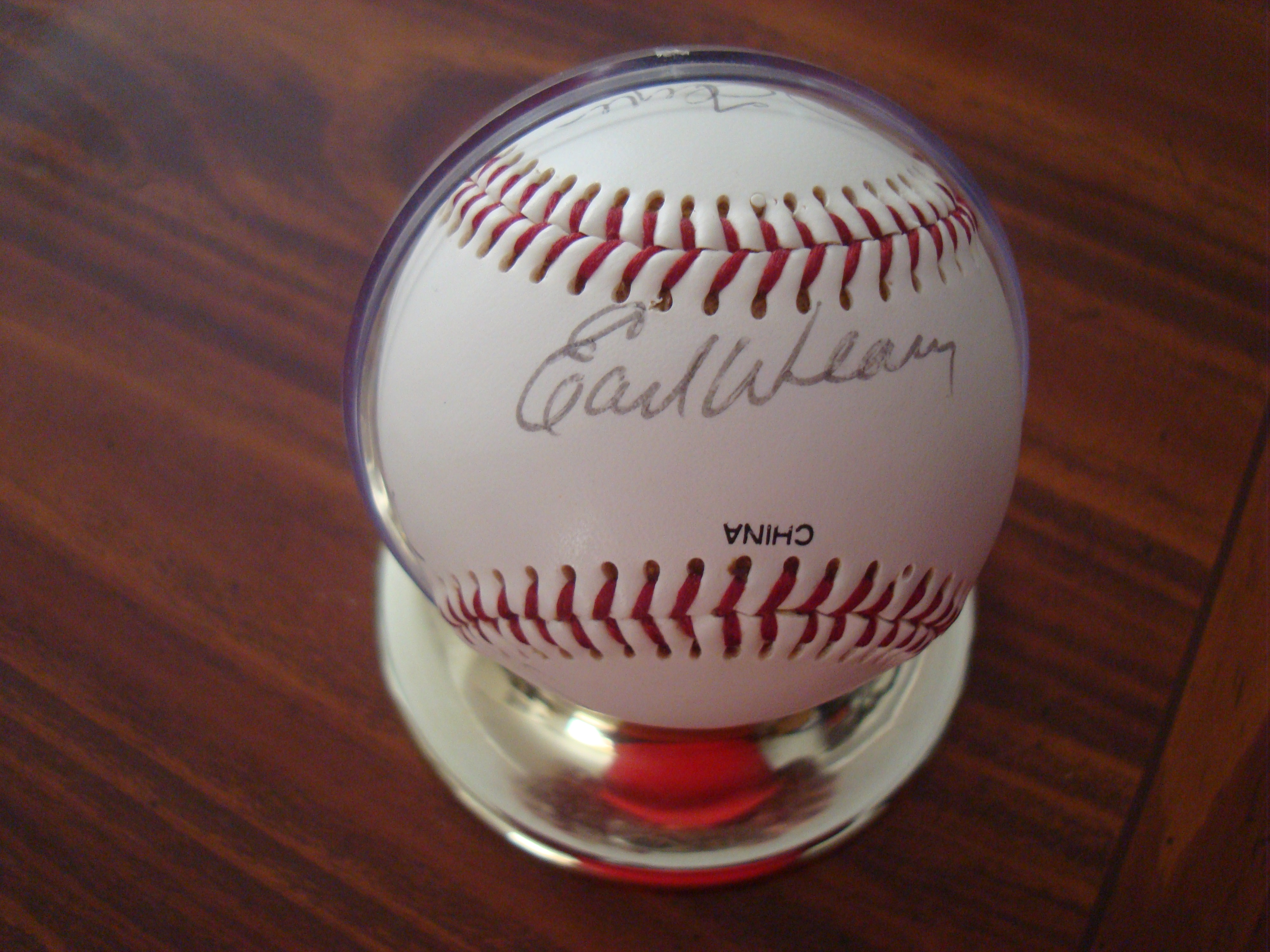
Weaver's signature, circa 1992–1993

Weaver's oft-quoted managerial philosophy was "pitching, defense, and the three-run homer." He eschewed the use of so-called "inside baseball" or "small ball" tactics such as the stolen base, the hit and run, or the sacrifice bunt, saying "if you play for one run, that's all you'll get" and "on offense, your most precious possessions are your 27 outs". Weaver claimed to have never even had a sign for the hit and run.

Weaver's philosophy had, however, evolved over time. From 1969 to 1982, Weaver's Orioles were fourth in stolen bases and had the third-highest success rate in baseball. From 1969 to 1975 his teams also averaged approximately 70 sacrifice bunts per year, and finished above league average five of those seven years. The Orioles were still among teams most commonly using the sacrifice bunt after the introduction of the designated hitter rule. It was only mid-career that he began reducing use of the sacrifice bunt, and from 1977 to 1981 his clubs never had more than 48 sacrifice bunts in a year and consistently ranked below the league average during that time.

Weaver insisted his players maintained a professional appearance at all times. He allowed mustaches, but not beards, and, as a rule, players had to wear a suit or jacket and tie on board an airplane for road trips. Weaver "was fiercely loyal to his players," said Palmer, who recalled that in 1976 the manager took his side when he was negotiating for a raise with the Orioles' owners. "He just never got to know them," Palmer remembered, observing that the first time Weaver ran into Dennis Martínez after retiring, all he had to say to Martínez was, "How's your curveball?" After he became the Orioles' manager, he hated being referred to as "Coach," complaining even when players mistakenly referred to him as that out of respect.

==== Use of statistics ====
Weaver made extensive use of statistics to create favorable matchups and kept various notebooks with splits and head-to-head numbers for his batters and against his pitchers. In 1984, Weaver was credited by sportscaster Craig Sager, then of CNN, with being the first major league manager to have used computerized statistical records as part of his decision-making process.

==== Use of the bench ====
In the Orioles teams of the late 1970s and early 1980s, Weaver made frequent use of platoons. He was also known for exploiting a loophole in the designated hitter rule by listing as the DH one of his starting pitchers who would not be appearing in that day's game, who would then be substituted before their first at-bat, allowing him to use a pinch-hitter in the case the opposing starting pitcher left the game early before it was the DH's turn in the batting order. This strategy was made illegal by a later rule change.

==== Lack of knowledge about pitching ====
In 1967, the Orioles sent Jim Palmer down to Rochester to rehabilitate a sore pitching arm. In his first game with the Red Wings Palmer was pitching with the bases loaded against 19-year old future Hall of Fame catcher Johnny Bench. Palmer recalled that Weaver said to him on how to pitch Bench, "Throw the ball over the middle of the plate. . . . This guy's nothing". Bench hit a grand slam home run, the only one Palmer gave up in his entire career. In light of that experience Palmer said, "I learned a lot from Earl Weaver. The first thing I learned was that he didn't know a thing about pitching." Dave McNally similarly said: "The only thing Earl Weaver knows about pitching is that he can't hit it."

Palmer did, however, credit Weaver's ability to recognize good pitchers. "He could spot them, trade for them, stick with them. He might have driven them crazy, but he knew which ones to drive crazy." Weaver would say that he'd "[given] Mike Cuellar more chances than [he] gave [his] first wife." Weaver was a fan of sliders; Mike Flanagan noted that Weaver got less angry when pitchers gave up hits on sliders than when they gave up hits on other pitches.

Weaver believed in the primary importance of throwing strikes and was known to demote pitchers who did not throw strikes. Within this overall philosophy, he placed full trust in his pitching coaches, George Bamberger (1968–77) and Ray Miller (1978–82), to guide and teach the pitching staff. During his initial tenure as manager (1968–82), Oriole pitchers won all six of the team's Cy Young Awards (Cuellar in 1969, Palmer in 1973,1975–76, Flanagan in 1979, and Steve Stone in 1980). His pitchers had 22 different 20-win seasons, the most for any manager in over a century (since 1920).

As a minor league manager with the Elmira Pioneers in 1962, Weaver had developed a successful pitching style for Steve Dalkowski, legendary for both the historically high velocity of his fastball and an extraordinary lack of control over that fastball. None of Dalkowski's prior managers or coaches, including Weaver in 1959, were effective in harnessing Dalkowski's potential. Following Weaver's directives to simplify his pitching to a very basic level, Dalkowski showed dramatic improvements over his control in 1962. Dalkowski was on his way to making the Orioles' major league roster the following year when an arm injury effectively ended his career.

=== Managerial record ===
Team	Year	Regular season					Postseason			
Team	Year	Games	Won	Lost	Win %	Finish	Won	Lost	Win %	Result
BAL	1968	82	48	34	.585	2nd in AL	–	–	–	–
BAL	1969	162	109	53	.673	1st in AL East	4	4	.500	Lost World Series (NYM)
BAL	1970	162	108	54	.667	1st in AL East	7	1	.875	Won World Series (CIN)
BAL	1971	158	101	57	.639	1st in AL East	6	4	.600	Lost World Series (PIT)
BAL	1972	154	80	74	.519	3rd in AL East	–	–	–	–
BAL	1973	162	97	65	.599	1st in AL East	2	3	.400	Lost ALCS (OAK)
BAL	1974	162	91	71	.562	1st in AL East	1	3	.250	Lost ALCS (OAK)
BAL	1975	159	90	69	.566	2nd in AL East	–	–	–	–
BAL	1976	162	88	74	.543	2nd in AL East	–	–	–	–
BAL	1977	161	97	64	.602	2nd in AL East	–	–	–	–
BAL	1978	161	90	71	.559	4th in AL East	–	–	–	–
BAL	1979	159	102	57	.642	1st in AL East	6	5	.545	Lost World Series (PIT)
BAL	1980	162	100	62	.617	2nd in AL East	–	–	–	–
BAL	1981	54	31	23	.574	2nd in AL East	–	–	–	–
BAL	1981	51	28	23	.549	4th in AL East	–	–	–	–
BAL	1982	162	94	68	.580	2nd in AL East	–	–	–	–
BAL	1985	105	53	52	.505	4th in AL East	–	–	–	–
BAL	1986	162	73	89	.451	7th in AL East	–	–	–	–
Total		2540	1480	1060	.583		26	20	.565	

== Broadcasting career ==
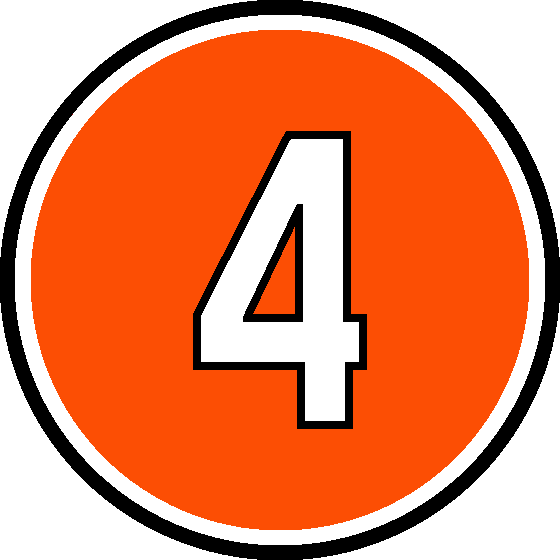
Earl Weaver's number 4 was retired by the Baltimore Orioles in 1982.

=== ABC ===
Between his stints as manager, Weaver served as a color commentator for ABC television, calling the 1983 World Series along with Al Michaels and Howard Cosell. Weaver was the lead ABC color commentator in 1983 (replacing Don Drysdale, who moved over to secondary play-by-play for ABC) but was also employed by the Baltimore Orioles as a consultant. At the time, ABC had a policy preventing an announcer who was employed by a team from working games involving that team. This policy forced Weaver to resign from the Orioles consulting position in October so that he could call the World Series for ABC. Weaver later called the 1984 National League Championship Series (between the San Diego Padres and Chicago Cubs) for ABC alongside fellow hall of famers Reggie Jackson, who played for Weaver in 1976, and Don Drysdale.

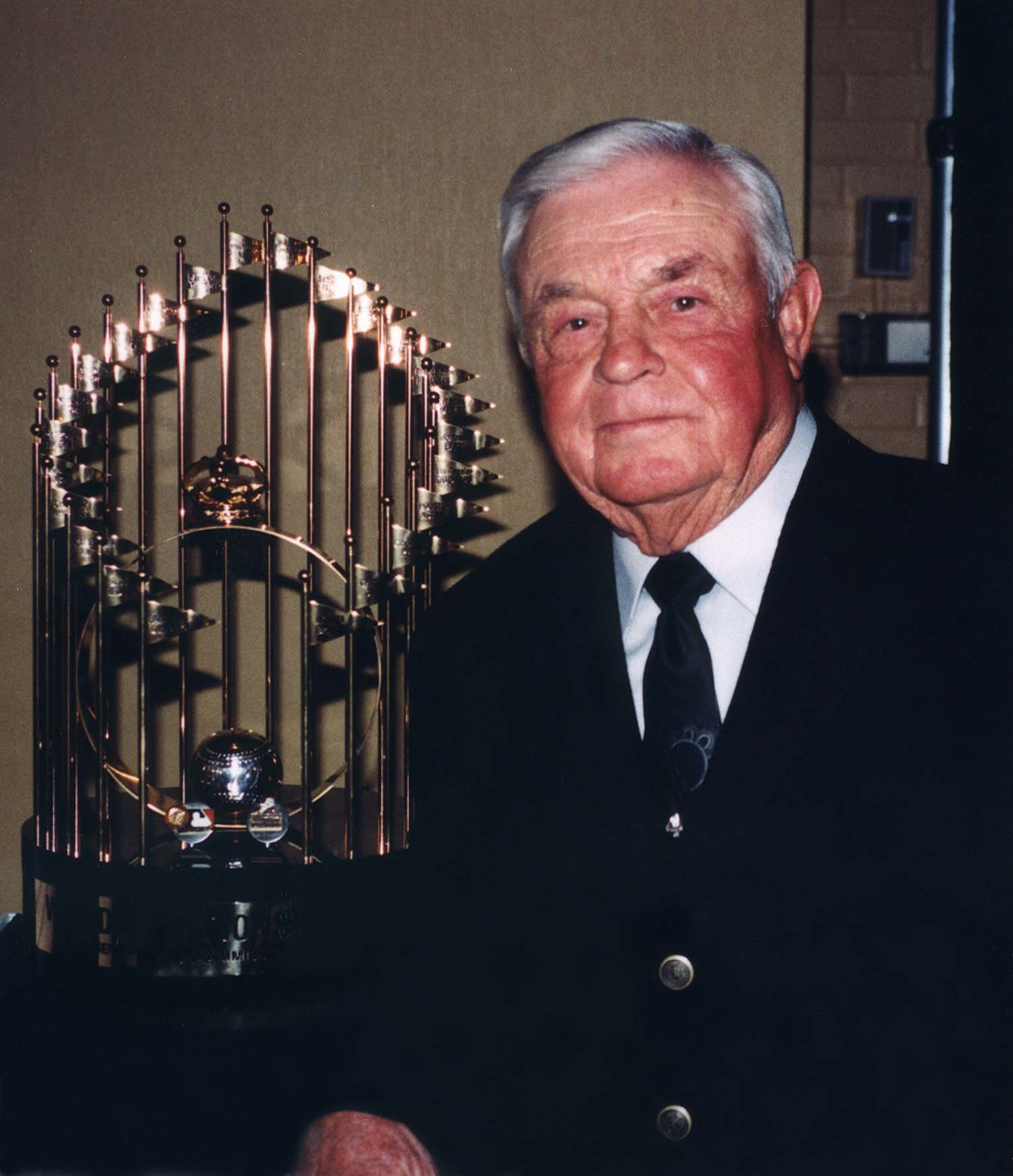
Weaver with the 1970 World Series Trophy in 2000

=== Manager's Corner ===
While managing the Orioles, Weaver hosted a radio show called Manager's Corner with Baltimore Oriole play-by-play announcer Tom Marr in which he would give his views on baseball and answer questions from fans. Weaver and Marr once recorded a prank version of the program, giving hilarious off-color answers to queries ranging from Terry Crowley, "team speed" and even growing tomatoes (Weaver and groundskeeper Pat Santarone had a friendly rivalry on this topic, and the latter had a fenced off tomato patch in left field foul territory at Memorial Stadium). The tape, which was not broadcast at the time, has since become legendary in Baltimore sports circles and has even been aired (in heavily edited fashion) on local sports radio.

== In media ==
Weaver wrote three books: Winning! (1972), Weaver on Strategy (1984), and It's What You Learn After You Know It All That Counts (1983).

In 1987, Weaver assisted in the development of the AI for the computer game Earl Weaver Baseball, which was published by Electronic Arts. The game was one of the precursors of the EA Sports line.

== Death ==
On January 19, 2013, Weaver died of an apparent heart attack while on an Orioles fantasy cruise in the Caribbean. He was 82 years old.

== Legacy and honors ==
Weaver was inducted into the Baltimore Orioles Hall of Fame in 1983 and the Professional Baseball Hall of Fame in 1996. Upon Weaver's death, Bud Selig, then-commissioner of Major League Baseball, released the following statement: "Earl Weaver was a brilliant baseball man, a true tactician in the dugout and one of the key figures in the rich history of the Baltimore Orioles, the club he led to four American League pennants and the 1970 World Series championship ... Having known Earl throughout my entire career in the game, I have many fond memories of the Orioles and the Brewers squaring off as American League East rivals. Earl's managerial style proved visionary, as many people in the game adopted his strategy and techniques years later. Earl was well known for being one of the game's most colorful characters with a memorable wit, but he was also amongst its most loyal. On behalf of Major League Baseball, I send my deepest condolences to his wife, Marianna, their family and all Orioles fans."

Orioles managing partner Peter Angelos added: "Earl Weaver stands alone as the greatest manager in the history of the Orioles organization and one of the greatest in the history of baseball ... This is a sad day for everyone who knew him and for all Orioles fans. Earl made his passion for the Orioles known both on and off the field."

== See also ==
- List of Major League Baseball managers with most career ejections
- List of Major League Baseball managerial wins and winning percentage leaders

Preceded by Gene Woodling	Baltimore Orioles First Base Coach; 1968	Succeeded by George Staller
