= George Bamberger =

American baseball player, coach, and manager (1923–2004)

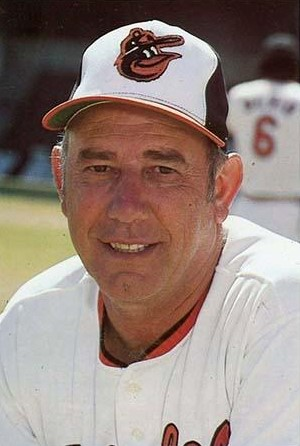
- Pitcher / Manager
- Born: August 1, 1923; Staten Island, New York City, New York, U.S.
- Died: April 4, 2004 (aged 80); North Redington Beach, Florida, U.S.
- Batted: Right Threw: Right

MLB debut
- April 19, 1951, for the New York Giants

Last MLB appearance
- April 22, 1959, for the Baltimore Orioles

MLB statistics
- Win–loss record: 0–0
- Earned run average: 9.42
- Strikeouts: 3
- Managerial record: 458–478
- Stats at Baseball Reference
- Managerial record at Baseball Reference

Teams
- As player: New York Giants (1951–1952); Baltimore Orioles (1959); As manager: Milwaukee Brewers (1978–1980); New York Mets (1982–1983); Milwaukee Brewers (1985–1986)

Career highlights and awards
- World Series champion (1970); Baltimore Orioles Hall of Fame

George Irvin Bamberger (August 1, 1923 – April 4, 2004) was an American professional baseball player, pitching coach and manager. In Major League Baseball, the right-handed pitcher appeared in ten games, nine in relief, for the 1951–52 New York Giants and the 1959 Baltimore Orioles. He later spent ten seasons (1968–77) as the Orioles' pitching coach and managed the Milwaukee Brewers (1978–80; 1985–86) and New York Mets (1982–83). During his playing career, he threw and batted right-handed, stood 6 feet (1.8 m) tall and weighed 175 pounds (79 kg).

== Early life ==
Bamberger was born on August 1, 1923, in Staten Island, New York City, New York, where he was raised. He attended McKee Vocational High School in Staten Island. He entered the military in February of 1943, and served in the United States Army during World War II in the Mediterranean and European theaters of operations.

== Playing career ==
Bamberger signed with the hometown New York Giants in 1946. He was assigned to the Erie Sailors of the Class C Middle Atlantic League, where he had a 13–3 record and 1.35 earned run average (ERA) with eight shutouts in 18 games started. Bamberger reached double digits in wins during four of his first five minor league seasons; he would record ten or more victories in 15 of his 18 years as a minor league pitcher, and win 213 total games during that span (1946–63), with a 3.72 ERA.

Bamberger made the Giants' 28-man roster at the outset of the 1951 season. In his big-league debut on April 19, 1951, during a Patriots' Day doubleheader against the Boston Braves at Braves Field, he gave up three hits (including a home run to Sam Jethroe) and two earned runs in two innings pitched. Nine days later, he struggled again, as he surrendered a base on balls and then a two-run home run to Jackie Robinson, while recording no outs, against the Brooklyn Dodgers.

Bamberger spent the rest of that season with the Triple-A Ottawa Giants of the International League. He pitched a no-hitter for Ottawa on Father’s Day in 1951, shortly after his daughter was born.

In 1952, Bamberger again was a member of the big-league Giants during the season's early weeks. He appeared in five more games, all as a relief pitcher, but was largely ineffective, allowing six hits, three walks, and four earned runs in four full innings of work. After June 1, he was sent to the Oakland Oaks of the top-level Pacific Coast League (PCL), going 14–6, with a 2.88 ERA. He would spend the bulk of the rest of his playing career in the PCL. The Oaks transferred to Vancouver, British Columbia, in 1956, and became affiliated with the Orioles.

Bamberger remained with the renamed Vancouver Mounties for another seven years until the franchise moved again, to Dallas, Texas, in 1963. (The Mounties ceased playing for 1963-64. In 1963, the already existing Dallas-Fort Worth Rangers moved from the Triple-A American Association to the PCL, and Bamberger played for that team in 1963.) In 1958, he had a 15–11 record with a 2.45 ERA. That year, he had a streak of 68.2 consecutive innings without giving up a base on balls, a league record. Later, as a pitching coach, he emphasized the need to throw strikes.

In the midst of his PCL tenure, however, in 1959, the 35-year-old Bamberger received his third and final major league trial with the Mounties' parent club, the Baltimore Orioles. In his American League debut on April 16, Bamberger was the starting pitcher against the defending World Champion New York Yankees at Memorial Stadium. He held the Yankees scoreless for five full innings, as Baltimore built a 2–0 lead. But in the sixth, he surrendered a two-run double to Norm Siebern, tying the game; and then, after the Orioles had gone ahead 3–2 in their half of the sixth, he gave up the lead in the seventh frame. He left after 6 1/3 innings, having allowed four earned runs on four hits, with Baltimore trailing by a run. (The Orioles eventually prevailed, 7–4, with Billy O'Dell getting the win in relief.)

After two relief appearances with the Orioles, Bamberger returned to the Pacific Coast League, where he went 11–7, with a 2.98 ERA. But that was his final chance in major league baseball, and he would spend the rest of his pitching career in the PCL, ending his career with the 1963 Dallas-Fort Worth Rangers, going 7–15, with a 4.53 ERA. He never recorded a decision in the Majors, and compiled a 9.42 earned run average with 25 hits and ten bases on balls allowed, and three strikeouts, over 14 1/3 innings.

== Coaching and managerial career ==
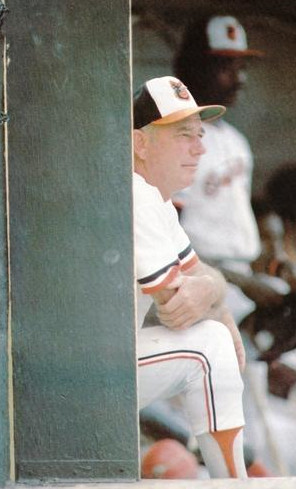
Bamberger in 1977

=== Baltimore Orioles pitching coach ===
As a pitching coach, Bamberger's pitching philosophy was to throw strikes. He thought it was not rational to try and pinpoint pitches, and the key to success was changing speeds and types of pitches, while throwing down the middle. He also would teach his famed illegal spitball pitch, "The Staten Island Sinker".

Hall of Fame pitcher Jim Palmer, who played over a decade for Bamberger in the minor and major leagues, said that Bamberger's strengths were in realizing each pitcher was unique, not overcoaching, remaining unflappable and never panicking. Bamberger's calm and level demeanor were an important counterbalance for Orioles pitchers in dealing with manager Earl Weaver's explosive and intense nature.

In 1960–63, Bamberger served as a player-coach for the Mounties and Dallas-Fort Worth Rangers while still pitching regularly (working in 135 games, 110 as a starter). While in Vancouver and Dallas-Fort Worth, he coached future major league pitchers such as Denny Lemaster, Claude Raymond, Ted Abernathy, John O'Donaghue, and Lee Stange. In 1960, the Mounties were affiliated with the Orioles, but in 1961 they changed affiliations to the Milwaukee Braves, and in 1962 to the Minnesota Twins. The 1963 Rangers were likewise affiliated with the Twins. Then, in 1964, he retired as a player and rejoined the Baltimore organization as its roving minor league pitching instructor.

The Orioles' farm system was then among the pioneers in standardizing player instruction, with career minor leaguers like Bamberger and future Orioles Hall of Fame manager Earl Weaver among those providing instruction in "the Oriole Way". Bamberger observed the Orioles looked for two things in players to join their system, talent and attitude. With Bamberger playing a key role, it was developing a corps of young pitchers that would help the club win the 1966 World Series. In 1964, the Orioles farm system included pitchers like Jim Palmer, Tom Phoebus, and Eddie Watt, and the Orioles had already brought up young pitchers like Dave McNally, Wally Bunker, and Steve Barber to the major league roster from its farm system; all of whom played on the 1966 world champion team.

He earned a promotion when general manager Harry Dalton appointed him to succeed Harry Brecheen as the Orioles' pitching coach on October 3, 1967; at the same time making Weaver the Orioles new first base coach. Bamberger took over a pitching staff that often saw young stars quickly lose their effectiveness due to sore arms. Dave McNally and Jim Palmer, two stars who recovered under Bamberger, credited a routine of regular exercises instituted by Bamberger for reversing the trend.

Bamberger believed that underuse, not overuse, created sore arms, thus he had both an exercise preparation regime between starts, and had his starters pitching long innings during the season . His pitchers ran every day, including sprints, believing that leg strength would improve stamina and coordination, which would maintain a pitcher's mechanics. He also had a throwing regime between starts. In the Orioles three consecutive 100-plus win seasons (1969-71), reaching the World Series each year, McNally threw 268.2, 296 and 224.1 innings; Mike Cuellar threw 290.2, 297.2 and 292.1 innings; Palmer threw 181 (in only 23 starts), 305, and 282 innings; and Pat Dobson threw 282.1 innings in 1971.

Serving under manager Hank Bauer and then Earl Weaver when Bauer was fired in 1968, Bamberger would remain with the ballclub through 1977 and five American League East Division championships, three American League pennants and the 1970 World Series championship. During that decade, he produced 18 twenty-game winners, including four for the 1971 American League champions: Jim Palmer, Mike Cuellar, Dave McNally and Pat Dobson, only the second time in baseball history a single team has had four twenty game winners in a season.

=== 1978–80: Manager of "Bambi's Bombers" in Milwaukee ===
Bamberger signed a two-year $120,000 contract to succeed Alex Grammas as manager of the Milwaukee Brewers on January 20, 1978. The appointment reunited him with Dalton, who had become the Brewers' new general manager two months earlier. Dalton said Bamberger “was the only man we considered” for the position. The Milwaukee franchise never had a winning record in its first nine seasons, prior to Bamberger's arrival. Stating that a major goal was instilling a winning attitude, he added, "Last year the feeling I got was that we (the Orioles) should not lose to the Milwaukee Brewers. We felt they did not care, that they felt we were going to win."

In his first managerial assignment, Bamberger led the 1978 Brewers to a 26-game turnaround. His club won 93 games and finished third behind the Yankees and Boston Red Sox in the AL East. Bamberger's influence on his pitching staff was reflected by a 30 percent decrease in walks allowed (566 vs. 398) and a 20 percent decline in home runs allowed (136 vs. 109). Team ERA dropped from 4.32 to 3.65, and both Mike Caldwell (22–9, 2.36) and Lary Sorensen (18–12, 3.21) enjoyed standout seasons. But a spike in offense would make an even larger mark on Bamberger's team. The 1978 Brewers hit 173 home runs (48 more than in 1977) and outscored their previous year's team by 165 runs, a 26 percent rise. Seven players hit double figures in home runs, and two (Larry Hisle, signed as a free agent, and Gorman Thomas) eclipsed the 30-homer mark. The Brewers became known as "Bambi's Bombers." The Sporting News named him its Manager of the Year.

Then, in 1979, Bamberger's Brewers hit 185 home runs, captured 95 victories and finished second, behind only Weaver's Orioles. However, in March 1980 during spring training, Bamberger was hospitalized with back and chest pains. He was diagnosed with a heart attack, underwent surgery and was sidelined until June 6. He re-took the reins from interim pilot Buck Rodgers, but did not finish the season, resigning on September 7 after compiling a disappointing 47–45 win–loss record. He stepped down with a 235–180 (.566) mark for his maiden managerial job, while turning Milwaukee into a contender for the American League pennant. The Brewers qualified for the playoffs in 1981 under Rodgers and won their only AL championship in 1982 with Harvey Kuenn at the helm. (The club moved to the National League Central Division in 1998.)

=== 1982–83: Struggles during Mets' rebuilding ===
Frank Cashen, another former Oriole executive, hired Bamberger as manager of the struggling New York Mets for 1982. The Mets had gone only 41–62 (.398) under Joe Torre during the strike-shortened 1981 season. The 1982 Mets—still in the early stages of a rebuilding process that would produce the 1986 world championship—played at almost an identical pace (.401), led the National League in bases on balls and finished second-worst in team ERA. Then the 1983 edition started even worse. They were 16–30 (.348) on June 3 when Bamberger resigned, saying, "I've probably suffered enough."

=== 1985–86: Second term in Milwaukee ===
A season and a half later, during the 1984–85 off-season, Dalton called Bamberger back into harness to attempt to revive the Brewers, who had plunged into the AL East basement in 1984. But this time, Bamberger was unable to turn the club around: they won only 71 games for him in 1985 (with the team ERA climbing by 0.33 to 4.39) and 71 more the following season. The bright spot on the Brewers' staff was left-handed starting pitcher Teddy Higuera, who won 15 games as a rookie in 1985 and 20 more the following season. Bamberger retired for a final time September 25, 1986, at age 63, turning the Brewers over to coach Tom Trebelhorn with nine games left in the season. He finished his managerial career with a record of 458–478 (.489).

== Death ==
George Bamberger died on April 4, 2004, from cancer at his home in North Redington Beach, Florida. He was 80 years old.

== See also ==
- Staten Island Sports Hall of Fame

Preceded by Harry Brecheen	Baltimore Orioles Pitching Coach; 1968–1977	Succeeded by Ray Miller
