= Steve Dalkowski =

American baseball player (1939–2020)

- Pitcher
- Born: June 3, 1939; New Britain, Connecticut, U.S.
- Died: April 19, 2020 (aged 80); New Britain, Connecticut, U.S.
- Batted: Left Threw: Left
- Stats at Baseball Reference

Stephen Louis Dalkowski Jr. (June 3, 1939 – April 19, 2020), nicknamed Dalko, was an American left-handed pitcher. He was sometimes called the fastest pitcher in baseball history and had a fastball that probably exceeded 100 mph (160 km/h). Some experts believed it went as fast as 110 mph (180 km/h), others that his pitches traveled at less than that speed. As no radar gun nor similar device was available at games to measure the speed of his pitches precisely, the actual top speed of his pitches remains unknown. Regardless of its actual speed, his fastball earned him the nickname "White Lightning". Such was his reputation that despite his never reaching Major League Baseball (MLB), and finishing his Minor League Baseball career in Class B baseball, a 1966 article in The Sporting News about the end of his career was headlined "Living Legend Released".

Dalkowski was also famous for his unpredictable performance and inability to control his pitches. His alcoholism and violent behavior off the field caused him problems during his career and after his retirement. After he retired from baseball, he spent many years as an alcoholic, making a meager living as a manual laborer. He recovered in the 1990s, but his alcoholism left him with dementia and he had difficulty remembering his life after the mid-1960s.

Screenwriter and film director Ron Shelton played in the Baltimore Orioles minor league organization soon after Dalkowski. His 1988 film Bull Durham features a character named Ebby Calvin "Nuke" LaLoosh (played by Tim Robbins) who is based loosely on the tales Shelton was told about Dalkowski. Brendan Fraser's character in the film The Scout is loosely based on him. In 1970, Sports Illustrated's Pat Jordan wrote, "Inevitably, the stories outgrew the man, until it was no longer possible to distinguish fact from fiction. But, no matter how embellished, one fact always remained: Dalkowski struck out more batters and walked more batters per nine-inning game than any professional pitcher in baseball history."

== Early life ==
Of Polish descent, Dalkowski was born on June 3, 1939, in New Britain, Connecticut, the son of Adele Zaleski, who worked in a ball bearing factory, and Stephen Dalkowski, a tool and die maker. He began playing baseball in high school. He also played football as a quarterback for New Britain High School. He is reputed to have been able to throw a football 100 yards (91.4 m). During his high school football career New Britain was undefeated, winning the division championship in 1955 and 1956.

Dalkowski excelled the most in baseball during high school. He still holds a Connecticut state record for striking out 24 batters in a single game. Dalkowski started the 1957 high school baseball season with consecutive no hitters. In three high school baseball seasons, he had 313 strikeouts in 154 innings, with 180 walks.

In 2001, he was inducted into the New Britain High School Sports Hall of Fame.

== Baseball career ==
External videos
- Far from Home: The Steve Dalkowski Story (27:07), produced by Good Sports Solutions, directed by Tom Chiappetta, October 11, 2020

After graduating from high school in 1957, scout Frank “Beauty” McGowan signed Dalkowski with the Baltimore Orioles for a $4,000 signing bonus, and allegedly other payments. He spent his entire career in Minor League Baseball (1957 to 1965), playing in nine different leagues during his nine-year career.

Dalkowski's claim to fame was the high velocity of his fastball. Accurate measurements at the time were difficult to make, but the consensus is that Dalkowski regularly threw well above 100 miles per hour (160 km/h). Dalkowski's raw speed was aided by his highly flexible left (pitching) arm, and by his unusual "buggy-whip" pitching motion, which ended in a cross-body arm swing. Teammate, and future Hall of Fame executive, Pat Gillick reported Dalkowski had hypermobility in his shoulder and wrists. Dalkowski disagreed with Gillick on that.

Dalkowski had extreme difficulty controlling his pitches. He often walked more batters than he struck out, and threw numerous wild pitches — sometimes so wild that they ended up in the stands. Batters found the combination of extreme velocity and lack of control intimidating. Oriole Paul Blair stated that "He threw the hardest I ever saw. He was the wildest I ever saw". During Dalkowski's 1960 season with the Stockton Ports in the California League, umpire Doug Harvey observed that Dalkowski was the fastest throwing pitcher in the league, even when throwing at only three-quarters speed. But as to Dalkowski's control, Harvey added, "You think he's going to throw the ball right through the catcher. When he finds the catcher".

Dalkowski initially played for the Orioles' Class D minor league affiliate in Kingsport, Tennessee, the Kingsport Orioles of the Appalachian League. In 1957 at Kingsport, Dalkowski pitched a total of 62 innings, giving up only 22 base hits (3.2 hits per nine innings pitched) and striking out 121 batters, averaging an extraordinary 17.6 strikeouts per nine innings pitched. However, he finished the season with a 1–8 won loss record and 8.13 earned run average (ERA) because he walked an equally extraordinary 129 batters (18.7 bases on ball per nine innings pitched) and threw 39 wild pitches. By comparison, in 1957 Bob Turley led all MLB pitchers averaging 6.125 hits per nine innings pitched and 7.758 strikeouts per nine innings pitched; Jack Sanford led all MLB pitchers with 188 strikeouts (in 236.2 innings); and among all Orioles' pitchers throwing more than 50 innings in 1957, Al Ceccarelli had the worst bases on balls per nine innings pitched at 4.8.

Pitching for the Kingsport on August 31, 1957, in Bluefield, West Virginia, Dalkowski struck out 24 Bluefield Dodgers hitters in a single game, while also issuing 18 walks, and throwing six wild pitches. Dalkowski had been unnerved early in the game when one of his pitches hit a batter in the head, sending him to the hospital. Orioles assistant farm director Harry Dalton attended the game, and stated the ball rebounded off the batter’s helmet like a pop up to second base. That player, Bob Beavers, was knocked unconscious and chose never to play baseball again.

In 1958, Dalkowski played for the Class A Knoxville Smokies, the Class B Wilson Tobs, and the Class C Aberdeen Pheasants of the Northern League. In 1959, he played for the Pheasants and the Class D Pensacola Dons. In 1957 and 1958, Dalkowski either struck out or walked almost three out of every four batters he faced. Overall in 1958, he gave up 81 earned runs on only 46 hits, but walked 207 batters in only 104 innings. He also had 203 strikeouts. While with Aberdeen he threw a one-hitter but lost, 9–8, on the strength of 17 walks. On May 17, 1959, he struck out 21 and walked eight for the Pheasants, in pitching his only no-hitter.

His only appearance for the MLB Baltimore Orioles came during the 1959 preseason in Memorial Stadium, during an exhibition game against the Cincinnati Reds. He pitched one inning and struck out the opposing side. After seeing Dalkowski come out to pitch, Reds' manager Birdie Tebbetts demanded that Orioles' manager Paul Richards not use Dalkowski or Tebbetts would not send his batters out to hit. Richards was amused and kept Dalkowski in the game. Tebbetts sent out his three batters, but told them they would be fined $100 if anyone stood close enough to the plate to be able to swing at Dalkowski's pitches.

In 1960, while pitching for the Stockton Ports in the Class C California League, Dalkowski struck out 262 batters and walked 262, averaging 13.81 strikeouts and walks per nine innings pitched. He had the lowest ERA of his career to date (5.14), a career-high 170 innings pitched and a career-low 11 wild pitches; but his record was 7–15. In separate games, Dalkowski struck out 21 batters, and walked 21 batters. In 1961, with the Class B Tri-City Atoms, Dalkowski was 3–12, with 150 strikeouts and 196 walks in 103 innings.

Because a pitcher is generally considered wild if he averages four walks per nine innings (a rate considered awful by Sabermetrics) a pitcher of average repertoire who consistently walked as many as nine men per nine innings would not normally be considered a prospect. But such was the allure of Dalkowski's explosive arm that the Orioles gave him chance after chance to harness his "stuff", knowing that if he ever managed to control it, he would be a great weapon.

=== Playing under Earl Weaver (1959, 1962 to 1964) ===
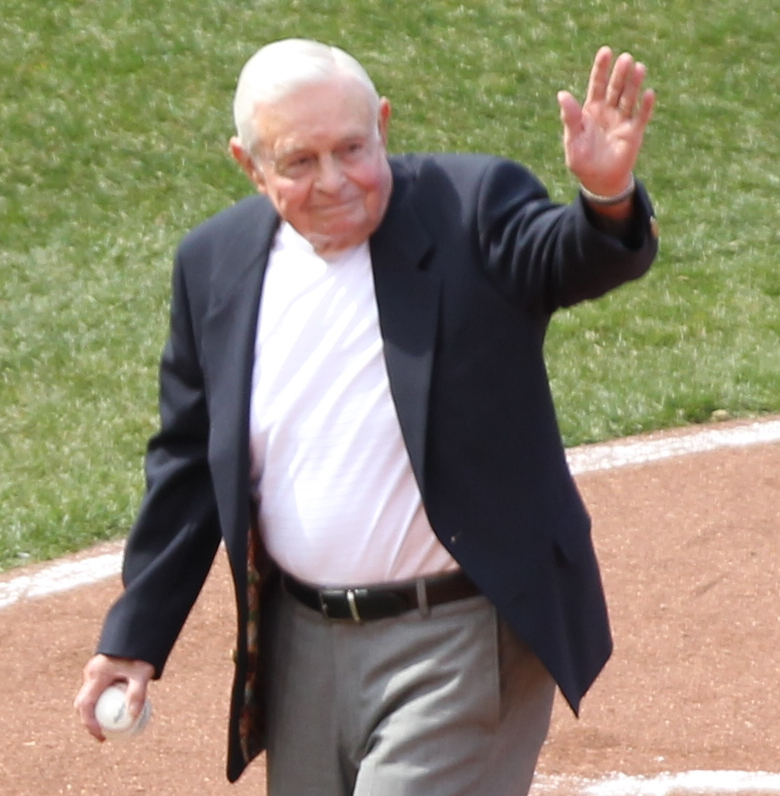
Earl Weaver managed Dalkowski with the Aberdeen Pheasants in 1959 and for several years with the Elmira Pioneers.

In 1959, Dalkowski played under future Hall of Fame manager Earl Weaver in Aberdeen. He played for Weaver again in the 1960s for the Orioles' Single-A (1962) and then Double-A (1963 to 1964) affiliate, the Elmira Pioneers, in Elmira, New York.

It has been reported that Dalkowski's pitching significantly improved under Weaver's guidance in 1962. The Orioles, under Paul Richards, had given all of the players in their organization IQ tests. It was discovered that Dalkowski had a lower than normal IQ. In another telling, it was Weaver who had Dalkowski take an intelligence test along with the team's most intelligent player (Mickey McGuire), for comparison. Weaver later said that Dalkowski scored in the lowest percentile of all the people who had taken that intelligence test. There is speculation that Dalkowski had a learning disability or behavioral disorder, but it is unquestioned that by this point in his life Dalkowski suffered from alcoholism. (Weaver himself had difficulties during his lifetime because of his own abuse of alcohol.)

Weaver reportedly believed that Dalkowski had experienced so much difficulty keeping his pitches under control because he did not have the mental capacity to weigh too many factors while pitching. Weaver made things simpler for Dalkowski by telling him to only throw the fastball and a slider, and to just aim the fastball down the middle of the plate. This allowed Dalkowski to concentrate on just throwing the ball for strikes. Weaver knew that Dalkowski's fastball was practically unhittable no matter where it was in the strike zone, and if Dalkowski missed his target, he might end up throwing it on the corners for a strike anyway.

Under Weaver's stewardship, Dalkowski had his best season in 1962, posting personal bests in complete games and earned run average (ERA), and walking less than a batter an inning for the first time in his career. Weaver got him down to 6.4 walks per nine innings, after never having been lower than 13.9, and after having been at 17.1 just a year earlier. His 3.04 ERA was over two runs lower than his previous best. In an extra-inning game that year, Dalkowski recorded 27 strikeouts (while walking 16 and throwing 283 pitches).

Dalkowski himself said that Baltimore Orioles' pitching coach Harry Brecheen made adjustments to Dalkowski's pitching motion in 1962, by teaching Dalkowski not to throw across his body, and this improved his control. Dalkowski said of his pitching motion before this alteration, “I hit my left elbow on my right knee so often, they finally made me a pad to wear". Brecheen later said of Dalkowski, "In 33 years in baseball I never saw anyone throw faster than he did".

York White Roses' player Dalton Jones hit well against Dalkowski. Weaver instructed Dalkowski to intentionally hit Jones with a pitch in a 1962 game between Elmira and York. Dalkowski did not want to do that, but Weaver persuaded him. Dalkowski's pitch hit Jones in the shin, with Jones falling to the ground; but Jones was not harmed because he was wearing a shin guard. The incident still lead to a brawl, where the White Rose players pummeled Weaver instead of Dalkowski, knowing it was Weaver's doing.

=== Final playing years ===
Dalkowski was invited to major league spring training in 1963, and the Orioles expected to call him up to the majors. On March 23, Dalkowski was used as a relief pitcher during a game against the New York Yankees. Most sources say that while throwing a slider to Phil Linz, he felt something pop in his left elbow, which turned out to be a severe muscle strain. Some uncertainty over the cause of his injury exists, however, with other sources contending that he damaged his elbow while throwing to first after fielding a bunt from Yankees pitcher Jim Bouton. Either way, his arm never fully recovered. He pitched only 41 innings in 1963, 12 of which were with the Triple-A Rochester Red Wings, the highest baseball level Dalkowski ever reached.

When he returned in 1964, Dalkowski's fastball had dropped to 90 miles per hour (140 km/h). He split time between Elmira and Stockton. He pitched poorly at Elmira that season in eight games, but had his best career season with any one team while playing in Stockton that year. Dalkowski was 8–4 at Stockton, with a 2.83 ERA while averaging 11.8 strikeouts per nine innings and only 5.2 bases on ball per nine innings.

He finished the 1964 season in the Pittsburgh Pirates’ farm system with the Columbus Jets. The Jets returned Dalkowski to the Orioles before the 1965 season. He started 15 games for Tri-City in the Orioles’ farm system, but was acquired by the Los Angeles Angels and finished the season, and his career, with the Class A San Jose Bees. He pitched a three-hit shutout during his time at San Jose, with six strikeouts and nine walks; but averaged over eight walks per game and less than eight strikeouts per game for the Bees. San Jose released him in May 1966, after not playing in any games.

Dalkowski had a lifetime win–loss record of 46–80 and an ERA of 5.57 in nine minor league seasons, striking out 1,396 and walking 1,354 in 995 innings. In MLB history, for pitchers throwing over 70 innings in a season, Shane Bieber holds the record with 14.2 strikeouts per nine innings in a season; and Gerrit Cole holds the record for those pitching over 200 innings, with 13.8 strikeouts per nine innings (through 2025). Dalkowski averaged over 17 strikeouts per nine innings with Kingsport in 1957, and Knoxville and Aberdeen in 1958; over 15 strikeouts per nine innings at Aberdeen in 1959; and 13.9 strikeouts per innings at Stockton in 1960. On the other hand, Al Hollingsworth is ranked 999th in MLB history in bases on balls per nine innings, averaging 3.5 (through 2025). Dalkowski averaged 20.4 walks per nine innings with Knoxville, 18.7 with Kingsport, 17.1 with Tri-City and 16.8 (1959) and 16.3 (1958) with Aberdeen.

=== Pitching speed ===
Dalkowski's wildness frightened even the bravest of hitters. Hall of Famer batter Ted Williams faced Dalkowski once in a spring training game. "Fastest ever", said Williams. "I never want to face him again". Davey Johnson played with Dalkowski at Elmira, was a Major League Baseball player for 13 years and MLB manager for 20 years, and saw hard throwing pitchers from Sandy Koufax to Aroldis Chapman. Johnson said no pitcher ever threw harder than Dalkowski. Longtime umpire Doug Harvey also cited Dalkowski as the fastest pitcher he ever had seen, faster than such pitchers as Hall of Famers Koufax, Tom Seaver and Bob Gibson, stating: "Nobody could bring it like he could." Harvey said "In one season he broke my bar mask, split my shinguards, split the plastic trim on my chest protector and knocked me back 18 feet (5.49 m)".

Former York White Roses and Boston Red Sox player Dalton Jones said the sound of Dalkowski's pitches while warming up put the fear of death in him should he ever be hit by one of those pitches. He considered Dalkowski's fastball noticeably faster than Nolan Ryan's or "Sudden" Sam McDowell's. Hall of Fame pitcher Nolan Ryan has the most strikeouts of any pitcher in baseball history, averaging over one strikeout per inning pitched; and during the 1960s McDowell led the American League in strikeouts five times (twice with over 300 in a season) and averaged nearly a strikeout per inning as a starter over his career. A full biography of Dalkowski was published in 2020, Dalko: The Untold Story of Baseball's Fastest Pitcher. In Sam McDowell's foreword to the book, he writes: "I will tell you this about Steve Dalkowski with absolute certainty, after seeing and listening to his fastball, and witnessing some very wild pitches: I truly believe he threw a lot harder than I did! It's likely he delivered the fastest pitch I ever saw!"

Estimates of Dalkowski's top pitching speed abound. Cal Ripken Sr., who was both Dalkowski's catcher for the Wilson Dobs in 1958 and Pensacola Dons in 1959, and his manager with the Tri-City Atoms in 1965, guessed that Dalkowski threw up to 115 miles per hour (185 km/h). Ripken said that Nolan Ryan's pitching speed did not compare to Dalkowski's. Most observers agree that he routinely threw well over 110 miles per hour (180 km/h), and sometimes reached 115 miles per hour (185 km/h). Radar guns, which were used for many years in professional baseball, did not exist when Dalkowski was playing, so the only evidence supporting this level of velocity is anecdotal. It is certain that with his high speed and penchant for throwing wild pitches, he would have been an intimidating opponent for any batter who faced him.

Andy Etchebarren, a catcher for Dalkowski at Elmira, described his fastball as "light" and fairly easy to catch. According to Etchebarren his wilder pitches usually went high, sometimes low; "Dalkowski would throw a fastball that looked like it was coming in at knee level, only to see it sail past the batter's eyes". One of Dalkowski's other catchers, Frank Zupo, said that "He was the fastest I've ever seen, but his ball was light as a feather to catch". Ripken Sr. said Dalkowski threw a low rising fastball that, when well thrown, would start as if it would hit the dirt but rose above the knees at the plate and "was light as a feather" when it reached him.

Dalkowski's greatest legacy may be the number of anecdotes (some more believable than others) surrounding his pitching ability. He was said to have thrown a pitch that tore off part of a batter's ear. Some observers believed that this incident made Dalkowski even more nervous and contributed further to his wildness. An apparently embellished version of umpire Harvey's story says that in a 1960 game at Stockton, California, Dalkowski threw a pitch that broke an umpire's mask in three places, knocked him back 18 ft (5.49 m) and sent him to a hospital for three days with a concussion. Dalkowski once won a $5 bet with teammate Herm Starrette who said that he could not throw a baseball through a wall. Dalkowski warmed up and then moved 15 ft (4.57 m) away from the wooden outfield fence. His first pitch went right through the boards. Dalkowski won other bets throwing the ball through wooden walls at the behest of his teammate Andy Etchebarren. Another teammate, Frank Zupo, saw Dalkowski win a bet by throwing a ball on the fly over 410 ft (125 m). On another bet, Dalkowski threw a ball over a fence 440 feet (134 m) away.

The only recorded evidence of his pitching speed stems from 1958, when Dalkowski was sent by the Orioles to Aberdeen Proving Ground, a military installation. Here, using a radar machine, he was clocked at 93.5 miles per hour (150.5 km/h), a fast but not outstanding speed for a professional pitcher. However, several factors worked against Dalkowski: he had pitched a game the day before, he was throwing from a flat surface instead of from a pitcher's mound, and he had to throw pitches for 40 minutes at a small target before the machine could capture an accurate measurement. Further, the device measured speed from a few feet away from the plate, instead of 10 feet from release as in modern times. This cost Dalkowski approximately 9 miles per hour (14 km/h), not even considering the other factors.

According to the Guinness Book of Records, a former record holder for fastest pitch is Nolan Ryan, with a pitch clocked at 100.9 mph (162.4 km/h) in 1974, though several pitchers have recorded faster pitches since then. Earl Weaver, who had years of exposure to both pitchers, said Dalkowski "was unbelievable . . . He threw a lot faster than Ryan. It's hard to believe, but he did". Aroldis Chapman is currently recognized as the hardest thrower in baseball, holding the record for the fastest pitch speed ever recorded (105.8 mph (170 km/h), thrown on September 24, 2010). Chapman also has thrown 9 of the 12 fastest piches on record, with Ben Joyce, Jordan Hicks, and Jacob Misiorowski being the only other pitchers who have reached 105 mph (169 km/h).

== Life after baseball ==
In 1965, Dalkowski married schoolteacher Linda Moore in Bakersfield, California, but they divorced two years later. Unable to find any gainful employment, he became a migrant worker. Dalkowski experienced problems with alcohol abuse. He drank heavily as a player and his drinking escalated after the end of his career. He received help from the Association of Professional Ball Players of America (APBPA) periodically from 1974 to 1992 and went through rehabilitation. He was able to find a job and stay sober for several months but soon went back to drinking. The APBPA stopped providing financial assistance to him because he was using the funds to purchase alcohol.

Former MLB pitcher Sam McDowell, who himself suffered from alcoholism, later became a consultant for B.A.T. (the Baseball Assistance Team) which worked with baseball players suffering from alcoholism, among many other services. Dalkowski participated in the BAT program, but was unable to control his drinking.

Poor health in the 1980s prevented Dalkowski from working altogether, and by the end of the decade he was living in a small apartment in California, penniless and suffering from alcohol-induced dementia. At some point during this time, Dalkowski married a motel clerk named Virginia, who moved him to Oklahoma City in 1993. She died of a brain aneurysm in 1994. Dalkowski had lived at a long-term care facility in New Britain for several years. In a 2003 interview, Dalkowski said that he was unable to remember life events that occurred from 1964 to 1994.

== Legacy ==
In 1998, Dalkowski's former teammate Pat Gillick was the Orioles' general manager. He had the Orioles honor Dalkowski by having him throw out the first pitch before a game at Camden Yards in Baltimore. For his contributions to baseball lore, Dalkowski was inducted into the Shrine of the Eternals on July 19, 2009. Sports Illustrated's 1970 profile of Dalkowski concluded, "His failure was not one of deficiency, but rather of excess. He was too fast. His ball moved too much. His talent was too superhuman... It mattered only that once, just once, Steve Dalkowski threw a fastball so hard that Ted Williams never even saw it. No one else could claim that". Billy DeMars, who managed Dalkowski in Aberdeen (1958) and Stockton (1960), had Dalkowski try psychiatry and hypnosis to overcome his excessive drinking, without success. When Dalkowsi was 44 years-old, in frail health and unable to work because of his alcoholism, DeMars said of him, "Sometimes you just sit and wonder what he might have been".

== Death ==
With complications from dementia, Dalkowski died from COVID-19 in New Britain, Connecticut, on April 19, 2020. He was one of many nursing home deaths during the COVID-19 pandemic in Connecticut.
