= American Family Field Walk of Fame =

Baseball exhibit in Milwaukee, Wisconsin

Coordinates: 43°01′45″N 87°58′21″W

A plaque commemorating former Milwaukee Brewers manager and hitting coach Harvey Kuenn on the Walk of Fame

The American Family Field Walk of Fame is an exhibit located at American Family Field in Milwaukee, Wisconsin, that commemorates baseball players, coaches, executives, and broadcasters who have made significant contributions to Major League Baseball (MLB) in Milwaukee. Established by the Milwaukee Brewers in 2001 with the opening of the stadium, it encompasses the entire history of the Brewers since 1970 and that of the Milwaukee Braves, who played in the city from 1953 to 1965. Twenty-three individuals have been inducted as of 2024.

Each inductee is honored with a home plate-shaped granite slab featuring their name, uniform number, signature, and years associated with Milwaukee baseball. The slabs are arranged around American Family Field, circling the stadium and culminating with the statues of Hall of Famers Hank Aaron and Robin Yount, former team owner and Commissioner of Baseball Bud Selig, and broadcaster Bob Uecker.

Unlike the Milwaukee Brewers Wall of Honor exhibit at American Family Field, which honors only former Brewers who meet set criteria regarding career milestones or service time, individuals are elected to the Walk of Fame by Wisconsin media members and Brewers executives. Annual ballots include Brewers and Braves who were members of either team for a minimum of three seasons and have been retired for at least three years. Anyone named on 65% or more of all ballots cast is elected. Individuals must receive at least 5% of the vote to remain eligible in future years.

== Inductees ==
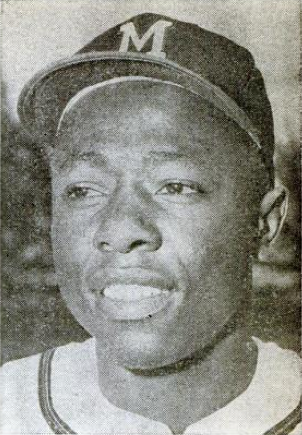
Hank Aaron, who was inducted in the Baseball Hall of Fame in 1982, won the 1957 National League MVP Award and was a 15-time All-Star during his Milwaukee Braves career.

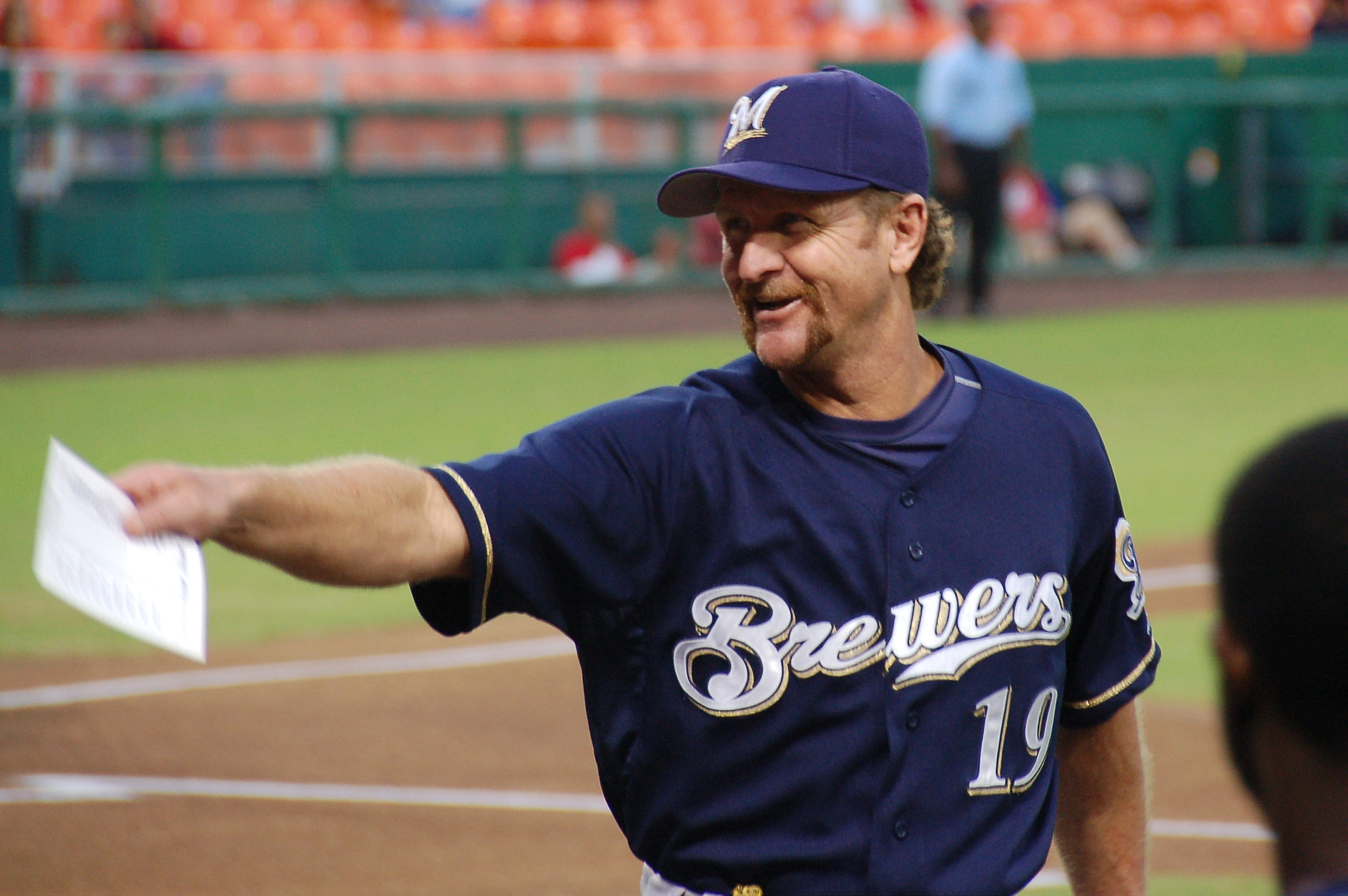
Robin Yount, who was inducted in the Baseball Hall of Fame in 1999, won two American League MVP Awards (1982 & 1989) and was a 3-time All-Star during his Milwaukee Brewers career.

Key
Position(s)	Indicates the inductee's primary position(s) or role(s)
†	Member of the National Baseball Hall of Fame
‡	Recipient of the Hall of Fame's Ford C. Frick Award
*	Indicates career with the Milwaukee Braves

Walk of Fame inductees
Inducted	Name	Position(s)	Career	Ref(s).
2001	Hank Aaron^{†}	Right fielder* / designated hitter	1954–1965,* 1975–1976	
2016	Joe Adcock*	First baseman	1953–1962	
2024	Ryan Braun	Left fielder	2007–2020	
2010	Lew Burdette*	Pitcher	1953–1963	
2002	Cecil Cooper	First baseman	1977–1987	
2003	Harry Dalton	General manager	1977–1991	
2022	Prince Fielder	First baseman	2005–2011	
2001	Rollie Fingers^{†}	Pitcher	1981–1982, 1984–1985	
2004	Jim Gantner	Second baseman	1976–1992	
2015	Teddy Higuera	Pitcher	1985–1991, 1993–1994	
2018	Geoff Jenkins	Outfielder	1998–2007	
2005	Harvey Kuenn	Hitting coach / manager	1971–1983	
2013	Johnny Logan*	Shortstop	1953–1961	
2007	Eddie Mathews*^{†}	Third baseman	1953–1965	
2001	Paul Molitor^{†}	Third baseman	1978–1992	
2005	Don Money	Third baseman	1973–1983	
2007	John Quinn*	General manager	1953–1959	
2002	Bud Selig^{†}	Owner	1970–1998	
2023	Ben Sheets	Pitcher	2001–2008	
2007	Warren Spahn*^{†}	Pitcher	1953–1964	
2004	Gorman Thomas	Outfielder	1973–1976, 1978–1983, 1986	
2003	Bob Uecker^{‡}	Catcher* / broadcaster	1962–1963,* 1971–2024	
2001	Robin Yount^{†}	Shortstop	1974–1993	
