= Mo Gaba =

American sports radio personality (2006–2020)

- Born: Mossila Kingsley Gaba; January 26, 2006; Baltimore, Maryland, U.S.
- Died: July 28, 2020 (aged 14); Glen Burnie, Maryland, U.S.
- Occupations: Sports superfan; radio personality
- Known for: First person to announce an NFL draft pick in braille
- Awards: Baltimore Orioles Hall of Fame

Mossila Kingsley Gaba (January 26, 2006 – July 28, 2020) was an American superfan of the Baltimore Orioles and Ravens and a sports radio personality. In 2019, he became the first person to announce an NFL draft pick written in braille. Gaba was inducted into the Baltimore Orioles Hall of Fame in July 2020. Gaba had battled four diagnoses of cancer.

== Life ==
Mossila Kingsley Gaba was born January 26, 2006, in Baltimore, Maryland, and raised in Glen Burnie. His first diagnosis of cancer occurred at the age of 9 months. He became blind soon thereafter. After two diagnoses of retinoblastoma, he was diagnosed with osteosarcoma at the age of 6. Gaba had to leave on-site classes at George Cromwell Elementary and attend virtual school from the hospital after his bone cancer diagnosis.

He graduated from Lindale Middle School in June 2020, by which point he had spent 75% of his life in hospitals. He was enrolled to attend North County High School when he died.

== Sports radio and legacy ==
In 2015, Gaba began secretly calling in to sports radio while his mother was at work. She learned of his calls after receiving an invitation from the radio hosts, written in Braille, to speak at Gaba's school. Gaba became a regular guest on radio programs. He generated a following from his calls to 105.7 The Fan, Mix 106.5 and CBS Sports Radio. Fundraising efforts by radio listeners raised thousands of dollars after his latest cancer diagnosis. In 2017, he threw a ceremonial first pitch for the Baltimore Orioles during a series against the New York Yankees. Gaba participated in a coin toss at a Baltimore Ravens game. In June 2017, Gaba graduated from elementary school. In 2019, Gaba became the first person to announce an NFL draft pick written in Braille.

Despite aggressive chemotherapy, radiation, operations, and a bone marrow transplant, Gaba's cancer metastasized to his neck, legs, brain, and lungs. Hours before his death on July 28, 2020, Gaba was inducted into the Baltimore Orioles Hall of Fame as the second recipient of the Wild Bill Hagy award. His Braille draft card is also on display at the Pro Football Hall of Fame. Since 2020, the letters "MO" of Baltimore Ravens in the M&T Bank Stadium endzone are painted either gold or white in his honor, while Section 146 during the 2020 season (played with reduced attendance due to the COVID-19 pandemic) was dedicated as "Mo's Rows" and filled with cardboard cutouts of Gaba and his mother.

On the second anniversary of Gaba's death, the Orioles celebrated the inaugural "Mo Gaba Day" on July 28, 2022, against the Tampa Bay Rays. The Orioles defeated the Rays 3-0, with an inside-the-park homer by Trey Mancini. Mancini and Gaba built a special bond when Mancini was diagnosed with colon cancer in March 2020. Mancini's inside-the-park homer ended up being his final at-bat for the Orioles at Oriole Park at Camden Yards, as he was traded to the Houston Astros the following week before the Orioles would have their next home game.
