= Jim Russo (baseball scout) =

American scout for professional baseball

James Joseph "Jim" Russo
- Born: April 22, 1922; Huntington, Indiana, U.S.
- Died: February 8, 2004 (aged 81); Grover/Wildwood, Missouri, U.S.
- Occupation: Baseball scout
- Years active: 1951-1986
- Employer(s): St. Louis Browns (1951-53); Baltimore Orioles (1954-1986)
- Known for: Baltimore Orioles Super Scout

James Joseph Russo (April 22, 1922 – February 8, 2004) was an American baseball scout for the St. Louis Browns and Baltimore Orioles. He has been called one of professional baseball's original "super scouts". He not only excelled in finding talented players to sign or acquire by trade, but also was a seminal modern pioneer of “advance scouting”, where the scout observes and reports on the tendencies of opposing teams to provide insight and strategy on how those teams could be more easily defeated. Most notably, his extensive three weeks of advance scouting of the Los Angeles Dodgers in 1966 is considered a watershed event in advance scouting and a key reason that the underdog Orioles defeated the Dodgers 4–0 in the 1966 World Series.

A New York Times article once referred to Russo as "baseball's secret weapon". In 2003, the Orioles established the Jim Russo Scout of the Year Award. In 2026, Russo was inducted into the Baltimore Orioles Hall of Fame. During most of his 33-year career with the Orioles, the team had the highest winning percentage of any team in Major League Baseball.

== Early life ==
Russo was born on April 22, 1922, in Huntington, Indiana. He was the child of Sicilian immigrants. Russo played semi-pro baseball in Huntington, but never professional baseball. At 17 years old, Russo also managed the semi-pro team that he organized. Russo worked as a school teacher. He served in the United States Army during World War II and was awarded a Bronze Star. He was a member of the Army Air Corps, stationed in the China-Burma-India theater.

After coming home from the war, Russo decided to pursue a career as a baseball broadcaster. He attended Huntington College for one year. Russo also took a course on radio broadcasting at Indiana University Fort Wayne. He next attended Columbia College Chicago that had a radio curriculum. Russo then was hired to work in Alma, Michigan, broadcasting Alma College football and basketball games, as well as high school basketball games.

== Baseball career ==
His first job in professional baseball was as a minor league announcer in Riverside, California, in the Class C Sunset League. His first scouting experience came in 1948, engaged by Jim McLaughlin of the St. Louis Browns as a bird dog scout (working on commission); on the recommendation of Browns' scout P. L. McCormick. (Years later, McLaughlin and his wife were godparents to the Russos’ youngest child.) Because of Russo's ability as a scout, the Browns and owner Bill Veeck made Russo a full-time scout in 1951.

Russo worked under McLaughlin, the Browns head of scouting and minor league system, who was ahead of his time in systematizing and analytically evaluating baseball prospects. When the Browns moved to Baltimore in 1954, as the Baltimore Orioles, McLaughlin maintained his roles on the new team, and kept Russo as one of his scouts. Russo was with the Orioles from 1954 to 1986. From 1966 until his retirement, Russo’s position was special assistant to the general manager.

McLaughlin taught Russo that a scout's worst sin was to be indecisive, and that with a good scout there was no "dancing". Russo always was direct with what he thought about a player. He also was trained by McLaughlin to consider a player's intangible qualities (such as intelligence, drive, handling pressure), as much as he considered a player's physical skills in evaluating a player. McLaughlin also wanted his scouts to gather as much information as possible about a prospect, and even brought in FBI agents to teach Russo and his fellow scouts intelligence gathering practices. Russo differed with McLaughlin concerning evaluating young pitchers. McLaughlin believed that a pitcher would never throw any faster than he threw at age 18, but Russo found this demonstrably inaccurate based upon his experience with, among others, Gary Bell and future Hall of Fame pitcher Nolan Ryan.

Another one of McLaughlin's innovations was to have the team's scouts crosscheck the reports of local area scouts before signing a player (and not simply taking the word of the local scout). In 1958, McLaughlin made Russo the Orioles national crosschecker scout, overseeing the reports of 14 local scouts over 26 midwestern and western states. Russo moved to St. Louis at the time with his family, and remained in the St. Louis area for the rest of his life.

McLaughlin and Russo were among the leading lights in establishing the Orioles future success. Along with other early Orioles leaders like Paul Richards, Harry Dalton, Earl Weaver and Cal Ripken Sr., they were integral to establishing "the Oriole Way". After McLaughlin left the team in 1961, replaced by his exceptional assistant Harry Dalton, Russo continued to be an important part of building the Orioles success. The team won American League titles in 1966, 1969 to 1971, 1979 and 1983; and had three World Series victories (1966, 1970, 1983).

=== Scouting and evaluating trades ===
Russo excelled in scouting players who would one day become stars for the Orioles. He played a leading role in the Orioles signing future Hall of Fame pitcher Jim Palmer, the Orioles all-time winningest pitcher. Russo said "A scout can spend a lifetime waiting to see a Jim Palmer". Russo was also integral in signing future American League All-Star and Most Valuable Player (MVP) Boog Powell, four-time 20-game winner Dave McNally, and Gold Glove second baseman Davey Johnson (also a future two-time Manager of the Year).

Johnson had been attending Texas A&M University when he signed with Russo and the Orioles. In signing Johnson, the Orioles paid him a bonus in addition to his salary, and also agreed to pay his tuition in completing college. As a scout signing players, Russo always agreed the Orioles would pay the player's tuition to finish college if they were giving up a college scholarship to join the Orioles. As the Orioles' national crosschecker scout, Russo also was involved in drafting or signing future Baltimore Orioles Hall of Fame players Mark Belanger, Rich Dauer, Doug DeCinces, Mike Flanagan, and Bobby Grich.

==== Johnny Bench ====
In 1965, Major League Baseball (MLB) established the free agent draft. The Orioles and the Cincinnati Reds had an arrangement to share scouting information that year. On the recommendation of the Orioles' scout in Oklahoma (Byron Humphrey), Russo went to Oklahoma to see 17-year old catcher Johnny Bench play. He recognized Bench's talent and wanted him for the Orioles, but when his old mentor Jim McLaughlin, at that time with the Reds, asked for player recommendations Russo told McLaughlin to send a scout to observe Bench; consistent with the teams' arrangement to share scouting information. In his autobiography, Russo states that he desperately wanted the Orioles to draft Bench in the first or second round of that first free agent draft, but his boss Harry Dalton, who lacked Russo's scouting experience, had other players he wanted.

Dalton drafted pitcher Scott McDonald (15th overall pick) and catcher Richard Horton from Dartmouth (35th overall pick) instead of Bench in the 1965 MLB draft. The Reds drafted Bench immediately after Horton with the 36th pick in the draft. McDonald and Horton did not go on to successful baseball careers. Horton played three years in the Orioles' minor league system, never getting above the Single-A level. McDonald played six years in the Orioles' minor league system, never getting above the Double-A level. After 17 years with the Reds, in which he was Rookie of the Year, a two-time National League Most Valuable Player, Gold Glove Award winner and multi-time All-Star, Johnny Bench went into the Baseball Hall of Fame and is often considered the greatest catcher in MLB history. Russo said that thinking of the Orioles' failure to draft Bench sickened him for years.

==== Frank Robinson trade ====
Russo was instrumental in acquiring Hall of Fame outfielder Frank Robinson from the Cincinnati Reds before the 1966 season; a trade that was instrumental in making the Orioles American League champions four times (1966, 1969 to 1971) and World Series champions twice (1966, 1970). The trade process for Robinson began when Jim McLauglin, still with the Reds, approached Russo on behalf of Reds' general manager Bill DeWitt (who co-owned the Browns when Russo originally worked for them at the start of his career). The Reds proposed trading Robinson for the Orioles best pitcher, Milt Pappas, rookie of the year Curt Blefary and pitcher Jack Baldschun.

Orioles' manager Hank Bauer did not want to lose Pappas and was against the trade. Russo knew Robinson was an extraordinarily talented player, and Russo became the one person who stood up to Bauer in favor of the trade, adamant that acquiring Robinson far outweighed losing Pappas. After Orioles' leadership stalled the trade over Blefary's inclusion, Russo was able to facilitate a new deal with the Reds that ultimately involved the Orioles receiving Robinson and the Reds receiving Pappas, Baldschun and outfielder Dick Simpson. In 1966, his first year with the Orioles, Robinson won the Triple Crown and led the Orioles to the American League pennant and World Series Championship. From the Orioles' perspective, it is considered one of the greatest trades in baseball history.

The trade's notoriety went beyond baseball into popular culture. In the film Bull Durham, the character Annie Savoy (played by Susan Sarandon) says "But bad trades are part of baseball; now who can forget Frank Robinson for Milt Pappas, for gosh sakes". In the film Trouble with the Curve, the character Mickey Lobel (played by Amy Adams) expounds on the trade's details and Robinson's prowess, in establishing her baseball expertise.

=== Other significant trades ===
Russo also was pivotal in the Orioles trading for Mike Cuellar before the 1969 season (for Blefary, among others). Russo had followed Cuellar for three years while Cuellar was pitching for the Houston Astros, and determined he would be an excellent candidate as another left-handed pitcher for the Orioles; even though he was nearly 32-years old. Cuellar's pitching style caused batters to hit ground balls, and the Orioles had three gold glove infielders in Brooks Robinson, Mark Belanger and Dave Johnson. Cuellar went on to win the Cy Young Award in his first Orioles season (1969), with a total career-Orioles record of 143–88 (1969 to 1976), four seasons of over 20 wins, and two seasons with 18 wins.

Russo was later involved with bringing pitcher Pat Dobson to the Orioles for the 1971 season. The 1971 Orioles are one of only two teams in major league history with four twenty-game winners (Cuellar, Dobson, McNally and Palmer) in a single season, and Russo was a key in the Orioles having each of those four pitchers. Other Orioles' trades in which Russo played a significant role included, among others, future Baltimore Orioles Hall of Fame members Lee May, Ken Singleton, Rick Dempsey, Scott McGregor, and Tippy Martinez.

=== Advance scouting ===
Russo was a pioneer in advance scouting. While Russo himself described Philadelphia Athletics pitcher Howard Ehmke as the first advance scout in 1929, the more common view is that Russo's advance scouting of the 1966 Los Angeles Dodgers is the watershed event of modern advance scouting. Starting in early September 1966, Harry Dalton, the Orioles director of player personnel, assigned Russo to attend the Dodgers' games and prepare a scouting report on the Dodgers; as Dalton correctly anticipated the Orioles would be meeting the Dodgers in the 1966 World Series. Russo attended 22 Dodgers' games.

While the Dodgers won the vast majority of the games Russo scouted, he observed weaknesses in the team's hitters, strategies that could limit the use of some of the Dodgers better players, and that future Hall of Fame pitcher Sandy Koufax had pitching tendencies that could be used against him if the Oriole batters were disciplined in their at bats. Along with two other Orioles scouts who later joined Russo in watching the Dodgers (Al Kubski and Harry Craft), Russo wrote up a 16-page single spaced report on the Dodgers' strengths and weaknesses. On the day before the World Series began, Russo spent two hours with the Orioles' players going over each point in his report on the Dodgers. The Orioles swept the 1966 World Series 4–0.

Russo considered his advance scouting on the Dodgers to be his career highlight. Jim Palmer, who pitched a shutout in Game 2 of the 1966 World Series, defeating Koufax, said that after hearing Russo's advance scouting report, "'I felt as if I had pitched against the Dodgers all year. That's how thorough Jim's report was'".

By 1977, Russo was regularly doing advance scouting for the Orioles. In 1983, his advance scouting reports on the Chicago White Sox and Philadelphia Phillies helped the Orioles win the American League pennant and World Series. Orioles Hall of Fame manager Earl Weaver, who had a tempestuous, but deeply close, relationship with Russo for well over a decade, said that "'Jimmy Russo helped us win a lot of ball games.'"

Others have been identified as developing advance scouting practices and/or as being advance scouts to some degree, before Russo. By at least the 2010s, some teams had replaced human advance scouts entirely with the use of video technology to study opponents.

== Legacy and honors ==
Orioles' executive Frank Cashen, who would later serve as the New York Mets general manager, gave Russo the nickname "super scout", and called Russo the best scout he ever saw. From 1954 to 1984, the Orioles won more games than any team in major league baseball. A 1984 New York Times article referred to Russo as "baseball's secret weapon". Orioles manager Joe Altobelli, who led the team to the 1983 World Series championship, said Russo was as important to the Orioles' success as any player.

In mentoring scouts, Russo would tell them "Trust what your experience and your heart tell you, because if you see a player that you really like, you'll not only see him with your eyes but feel it in your heart". Early in his career, Russo found himself overwhelmed and confused in how to scout a 60-team baseball tournament in Norman, Oklahoma. Wog Rice, an experienced scout with the Boston Red Sox, saw that Russo was confused and took the time to help him focus on who and how to scout in that situation. Russo not only became a loyal friend to Rice, but took the lesson with him into the future in guiding inexperienced scouts he encountered in learning their trade.

He co-authored with Bob Hammel SuperScout: Thirty-Five Years of Major League Scouting which was released by Bonus Books on 1 April 1992.

In 1991, he was inducted into the Greater St. Louis Baseball Scouts Hall of Fame. In 2003, the Orioles established the Jim Russo Scout of the Year Award. Huntington County (Indiana) Honors inducted Russo into its class of 2024. He was inducted into the Orioles' Hall of Fame in 2026.

== Personal life and death ==
Russo met his wife Betty while working as a minor league baseball announcer in Riverside, California.

Russo died on February 8, 2004, in Grover, Missouri, which is incorporated within Wildwood, Missouri.
