= Richie Bancells =

Richard L. Bancells
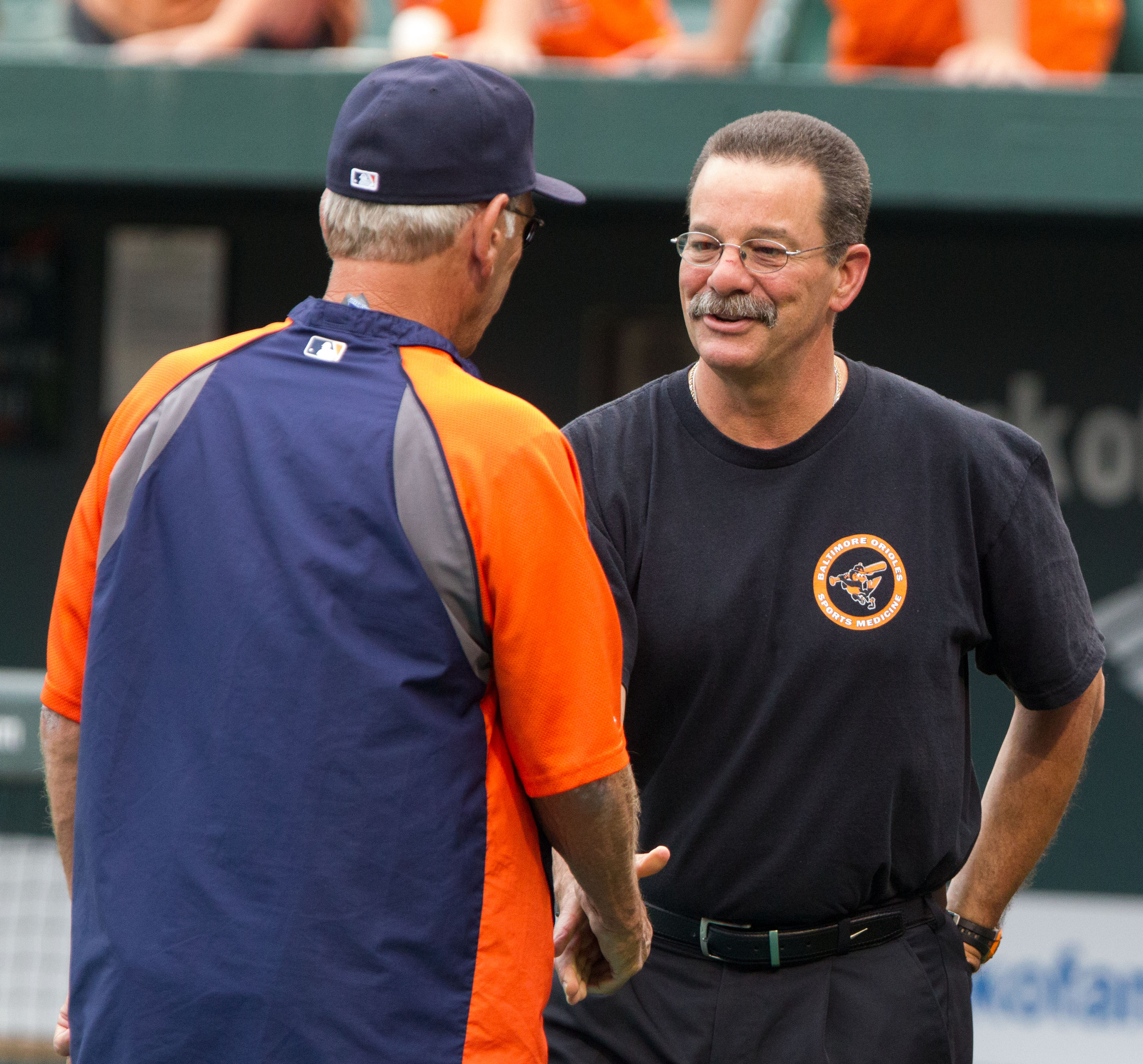
- Richie Bancells

Baltimore Orioles
- Head Athletic Trainer
- Born: November 11, 1955 (age 70); Key West, Florida

Teams
- Miami Orioles (1977); Bluefield Orioles (1978–1979); Rochester Red Wings (1980–1983); Baltimore Orioles (1984–2017)

Career highlights and awards
- Baltimore Orioles Hall of Fame (2011)

Richard L. Bancells (born November 11, 1955) is an athletic trainer who was the long-time Head Athletic Trainer for the Baltimore Orioles of Major League Baseball (MLB) from 1984 to 2017. Bancells has been widely credited with helping Cal Ripken Jr. achieve his record-breaking streak of 2,632 consecutive games played. In 2011, he was elected to the Baltimore Orioles Hall of Fame. On October 1, 2017, shortly before the Orioles final game of 2017, it was announced that Richie Bancells was retiring at the end of the season. At the time of his retirement, he was the longest-tenured member of the Orioles organization.

== Education ==
In 1978, Bancells graduated from Miami's Biscayne College (now St. Thomas University). Richie received his master's degree from Eastern Kentucky University in 1981.

== Professional career ==
Bancells started his professional athletic training career in 1978 with the Bluefield, West Virginia, Orioles, the major league team's single-A rookie club. His first day on the job coincided with Cal Ripken Jr.'s first day of playing professional Baseball. In 1980, he joined the staff of the Rochester Red Wings, then the Triple-A affiliate of the Baltimore Orioles located in Rochester, New York. In 1984, he was promoted to Assistant Athletic Trainer of the major league team and assumed the head athletic trainer position in 1988. His long-time assistant athletic trainer has been Brian Ebel. Bancells has served 3 terms as the President for the Professional Baseball Athletic Trainers Society, and currently serves on the executive committee as Past President.

== Marriage and children ==
Richie lives in Parkton, Maryland, with his wife, Carol. They have three children, Christopher, Andrea, and Timothy, and seven grandchildren.

== Awards ==
- 1995 Major League Training Staff of the Year
- 2011 Major League Training Staff of the Year
- 2011 Orioles Advocates Herbert E. Armstrong Award
- 2011 NATA Most Distinguished Athletic Trainer Award
