= Baltimore Orioles Hall of Fame =

Baseball team hall of fame

Orioles Hall of Fame
- Type: Hall of fame
- Awarded for: Professional baseball
- Sponsored by: Baltimore Orioles
- First award: 1977
- Website: Official website
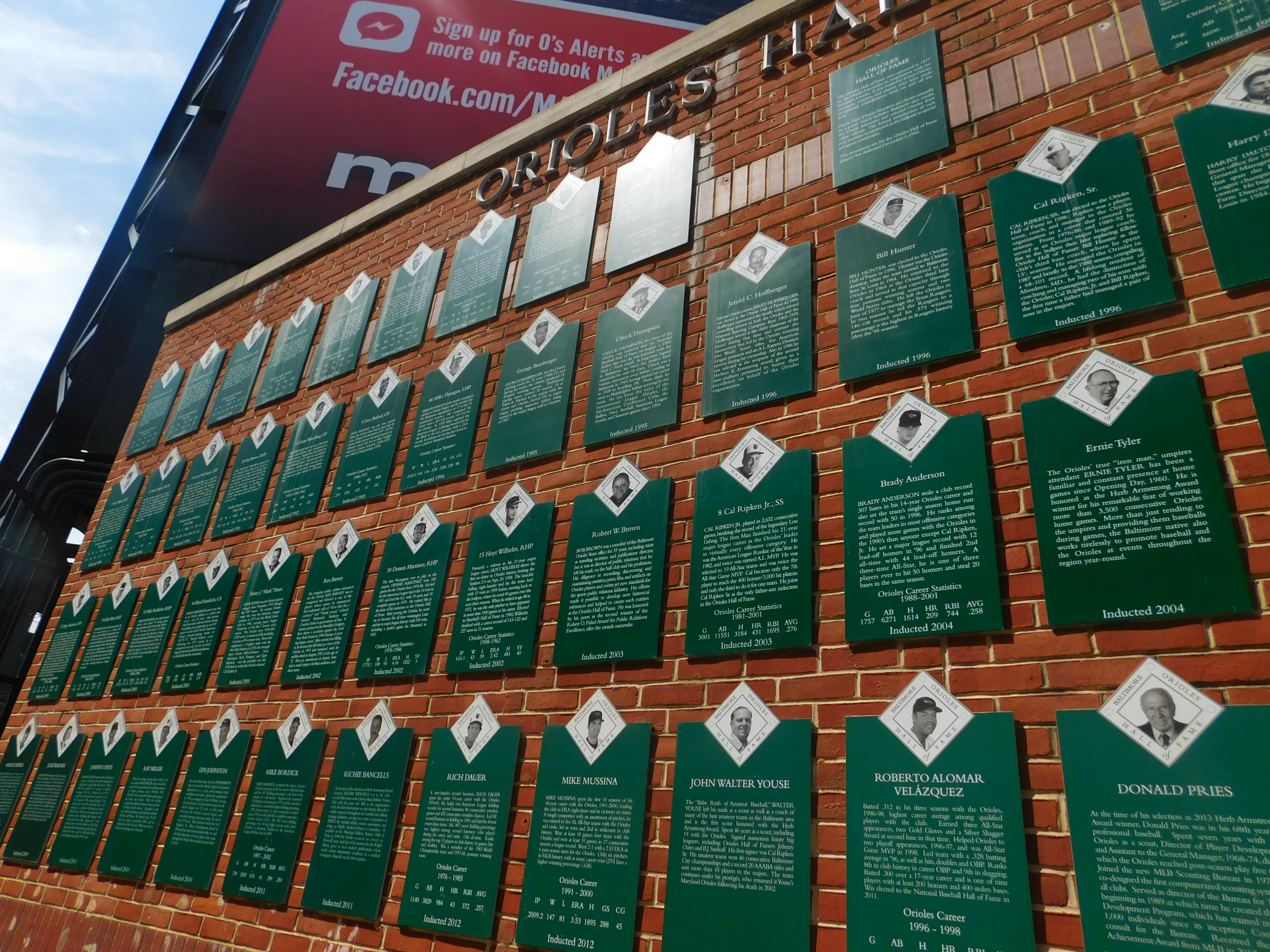
- Plaques at Oriole Park at Camden Yards

The Baltimore Orioles Hall of Fame is a team Hall of Fame dedicated to representing the most significant contributors to the history of the Baltimore Orioles professional baseball team since the first season of Baltimore baseball in 1954, which has inducted players, managers, staff, and other contributors. The Hall of Fame is on display at Oriole Park at Camden Yards in Baltimore, Maryland.

Key
Year	Year inducted
**Bold**	Member of the National Baseball Hall of Fame
†	Member of the Baseball Hall of Fame as an Oriole
**Bold**	Recipient of the Hall of Fame's Ford C. Frick Award

**Baltimore Orioles Hall of Fame**
Inducted	No.	Player	Position	Tenure
1977	5	**Brooks Robinson**†	3B	1955–1977
1977	20	**Frank Robinson**†	RF; Coach; Manager	1966–1971; 1978–1980, 1985–1987; 1988–1991
1978	19	Dave McNally	P	1962–1974
1979	8, 16, 26, 30	Boog Powell	1B	1961–1974
1981	11	Gus Triandos	C	1955–1962
1982	11	**Luis Aparicio**	SS	1963–1967
1982	35	Mike Cuellar	P	1969–1976
1983	7, 49	Mark Belanger	SS	1965–1981
1983	4	**Earl Weaver**†	Coach; Manager	1968; 1968–1982, 1985–1986
1984	6, 33	Paul Blair	CF	1964–1976
1984	12	Paul Richards	Manager/GM	1955–1961
1985	23, 32	Milt Pappas	P	1957–1965
1986	22	**Jim Palmer**†	P	1965–1984
1986	29	Ken Singleton	RF	1975–1984
1987	1	Al Bumbry	OF	1972–1984
1988	13, 29, 59	Steve Barber	P	1960–1967
1989	4	Jim Gentile	1B	1960–1963
1989	29	Dick Hall	P/OF	1961–1966, 1969–1971
1989	37	Stu Miller	P	1963–1967
1990	42	Hank Bauer	Manager	1964–1968
1990	16, 39	Scott McGregor	P	1976–1988
1991	28	Hal Brown	P	1955–1962
1992	14	Gene Woodling	LF	1955, 1958–1960
1993	9	Don Buford	LF/2B/3B	1968–1972
1994	46	Mike Flanagan	P	1975–1987, 1991–1992
1995	16	George Bamberger	P	1959
1995	—	**Chuck Thompson**†	Broadcaster	1955–1956; 1962–1987; 1991–2000
1996	—	Jerry Hoffberger	Owner	1954–1979
1996	6	Billy Hunter	SS; Coach	1954; 1964-1977
1996	7	Cal Ripken, Sr.	Coach/Manager	1976–1992
1997	—	Harry Dalton	GM	1965–1971
1997	24	Rick Dempsey	C	1976–1986, 1992
1997	6, 15	Davey Johnson	2B; Manager	1965–1972; 1996–1997
1998	3, 16	Bobby Grich	2B	1970–1976
1998	—	Lee MacPhail	GM	1958–1965
1998	14	Lee May	1B	1975–1980
1999	—	Frank Cashen	GM	1972–1975
1999	33	**Eddie Murray**†	1B/DH	1977–1988, 1996
2000	—	Jack Dunn III	Manager	1949
2000	23, 36	Tippy Martinez	P	1976–1986
2000	39	Eddie Watt	P	1966–1973
2001	52	Mike Boddicker	P	1980–1988
2001	44	Elrod Hendricks	C	1968–1972; 1973–1976; 1978–1979
2001	—	Hank Peters	GM	1975–1987
2002	—	Rex Barney	PA Announcer	1974–1997
2002	30, 61	Dennis Martínez	P	1976–1986
2002	15	**Hoyt Wilhelm**	P	1958–1962
2003	—	Bob Brown	Executive	
2003	8	**Cal Ripken Jr.**†	SS/3B	1981–2001
2004	9, 16	Brady Anderson	OF	1988–2001
2004	—	Ernie Tyler	Umpire Attendant	1960–2011
2006	11, 37	Doug DeCinces	3B	1973–1981
2006	17, 23, 28	Chris Hoiles	C	1989–1998
2006	—	Ralph Salvon	Trainer	1966–1988
2006	—	Eddie Weidner	Trainer	1954–1967
2007	—	Bill O'Donnell	Broadcaster	1966–1981
2007	17	B.J. Surhoff	LF/C/3B	1996–2000, 2003–2005
2008	—	"Wild Bill" Hagy	Fan	
2008	—	Phil Itzoe	Executive	1964–2008
2008	30	Gregg Olson	P	1988–1993
2009	3, 10	**Harold Baines**	DH/RF	1993–1995; 1997–1999; 2000
2009	—	Julie Wagner	Executive	1982–2005
2010	—	Lenny Johnston	Executive	1976–present
2010	31	Ray Miller	Coach/Manager	1978–1985; 1997–1999; 2004–2005
2010	12, 38	Johnny Oates	C Manager	1970, 1972; 1991–1994
2011	—	Richie Bancells	Trainer	1984–2017
2011	14	Mike Bordick	SS	1997–2000, 2001–2002
2012	25, 44	Rich Dauer	2B/3B	1976–1985
2012	35, 42	**Mike Mussina**	P	1991–2000
2012	—	Walter Youse	Scout	1957–1974
2013	12	**Roberto Alomar**	2B	1996–1998
2013	—	Don Pries	Scout/Executive	1968–1974
2015	38	John Lowenstein	LF	1979–1985
2015	35	Gary Roenicke	OF	1978–1985
2015	6, 13, 25, 56	Melvin Mora	3B	2000–2009
2015	—	Fred Uhlman, Sr.	Executive	1986–1997, 1999
2018	1	Brian Roberts	2B	2001–2013
2018	—	Fred Manfra	Broadcaster	1992–2017
2020	—	Mo Gaba	Fan	
2021	2	J.J. Hardy	SS	2011–2017
2021	10, 12	Mike Devereaux	OF	1989–1994, 1996
2021	—	Joe Angel	Broadcaster	1988–1990, 1992, 2004–2018
2024	21	Nick Markakis	RF	2006–2014
2024	10, 11, 37, 38	Terry Crowley	OF/DH; Coach	1969–1973, 1976-1982; 1985–1989, 1999–2010
2024	—	Dick Bowie	Scout	1958–1981
2025	10	Adam Jones	CF	2008–2018
2025	6	Joe Orsulak	OF	1988–1992
2025	—	Tom Davis	Broadcaster	1984–2002
2026	19	Chris Davis	1B	2011–2020
2026	39, 34	Storm Davis	P	1982–1986, 1992
2026	—	Jim Russo	Executive/Scout	1951–1986

== See also ==
- Sports Legends Museum at Camden Yards
- Babe Ruth Birthplace and Museum
