= Harry Dalton =

American baseball executive (1928-2005)

- Dalton in 1955
- General manager
- Born: August 23, 1928; West Springfield, Massachusetts, U.S.
- Died: October 23, 2005 (aged 77); Scottsdale, Arizona, U.S.

Teams
- As general manager: Baltimore Orioles (1966–1971); California Angels (1972–1977); Milwaukee Brewers (1978–1991)

Career highlights and awards
- 2× World Series champion (1966, 1970); 2× Sporting News Executive of the Year (1970, 1982); Baltimore Orioles Hall of Fame; Milwaukee Brewers Walk of Fame; Milwaukee Brewers Wall of Honor

Harry Inglis Dalton (August 23, 1928 – October 23, 2005) was an American front-office executive in Major League Baseball. He served as general manager of three American League (AL) teams, the Baltimore Orioles (1966–71), California Angels (1972–77) and Milwaukee Brewers (1978–91), and was a principal architect of the Orioles' dynasty of 1966–74 as well as the only AL championship the Brewers ever won (1982). He was twice named executive of the year.

Born in West Springfield, Massachusetts—also the hometown of Baseball Hall of Fame manager Leo Durocher—Dalton graduated from Amherst College and served in the United States Air Force during the Korean War, earning a Bronze Star.

== Early life ==
Dalton was born on April 23, 1928, in West Springfield Massachusetts. He graduated Amherst College in 1950 as an English major. He later worked as a sportswriter for the Springfield Daily News. Dalton served a three-year tour of duty in the Korean War with the Air Force, earning a Bronze Star as a combat press officer in Japan and Korea.

== Career ==
=== Baltimore Orioles ===
After a brief stint as a sportswriter in Springfield, he joined the Baltimore Orioles' front office in December 1953. The team was newly reborn from the relocated St. Louis Browns, and would begin their first season as the Orioles in 1954. He was originally looking to work in public relations, but was instead hired as an assistant to Jim McLaughlin, the Orioles' scouting and farm system director, who recognized Dalton's qualities and potential.

Under McLaughlin and Orioles manager Paul Richards, in the mid-to-late 1950s, the Orioles began to develop a uniform approach to creating a successful baseball organization, from the lowest minor league team up to the major leagues. Dalton, along with others such as "super scout" Jim Russo, and future Oriole Hall of Fame manager Earl Weaver, were part of Richards's and McLaughlin's early core group integral to the development of "the Oriole Way". This philosophy and practice led to the Orioles having the most wins of any major league team from the mid-late 1950s to the mid-1980s. From 1954-65, Dalton worked his way up the organizational ladder, rising to the position of director of the Orioles' successful farm system in 1961; replacing McLaughlin (who was fired because he and Richards could not get along). During these years, Dalton developed a mutual respect with the team's scouts that was essential to the Orioles success.

In 1956, Dalton had identified Weaver's potential as a manager, and recommended him to McLaughlin, who already knew Weaver as a teenage ballplayer from St. Louis. Dalton worked with, supervised and later promoted Weaver through the Orioles' minor league system. Weaver would later become key to the Orioles, and Dalton's, success as the team's major league manager.

In the autumn of 1965, Baltimore club president and general manager Lee MacPhail departed to become top aide to the new Commissioner of Baseball, William Eckert. Dalton was named director of player personnel—in reality, MacPhail's successor as head of baseball operations. His first order of business was to complete a trade McPhail was working on that brought Cincinnati Reds outfielder Frank Robinson to Baltimore for pitchers Milt Pappas and Jack Baldschun and outfielder Dick Simpson. Russo had been urging the Orioles to acquire Robinson for years, and had been key to engineering the trade that Dalton finalized.

Robinson, the 1961 National League Most Valuable Player, was one of the greatest stars in the game, but he had developed a strained relationship with the Cincinnati front office. In his first Baltimore season, Robinson won the Triple Crown and teamed with future Hall of Fame third baseman Brooks Robinson, future Hall of Fame pitcher Jim Palmer, future Hall of Fame shortstop Luis Aparicio, and future Most Valuable Player (MVP) Boog Powell, among others, to lead the Orioles to the 1966 World Series championship over the Los Angeles Dodgers in a four game sweep. The team was managed by Hank Bauer.

The Orioles were unsuccessful in 1967. In 1968, Dalton wanted the future Hall of Famer Weaver to manage the team, but the team owner wanted to keep Bauer. Dalton promoted Weaver from the Triple-A Rochester Red Wings to the Orioles first base coach for 1968. Dalton won approval to make Weaver manager midway through the season, as the Orioles were underperforming. Weaver had managed 15 of the team's 25 players in the minor leagues. Under Weaver, the Orioles finished the year with a strong 48–34 record (.585), finishing in second place behind the 103-win Detroit Tigers.

Over the next three years (1969-71), the Orioles won the American League title each season, sweeping every game of the first three American League championship series, and winning the 1970 World Series. The team won 109 games in 1969, 108 in 1970, and 101 in 1971. In 1970, The Sporting News selected Dalton as Major League Baseball's Executive of the Year.

The 1971 team had four pitchers who won at least 20 games, only the second time this has occurred in major league baseball history. Dalton traded for two of those pitchers, Mike Cuellar and Pat Dobson; and the other two, Jim Palmer and Dave McNally, joined the Orioles farm system when Dalton was its director. Cuellar won the Cy Young Award in his first year with the Orioles (1969), and won 18 or more games six times with them; McNally had four consecutive 20-win seasons as an Oriole; and Palmer became the winningest pitcher in Oriole history, as well as a Hall of Fame member.

In addition to Frank Robinson, Dalton had also traded for the team's leadoff hitter, Don Buford. Eight-time Gold Glove center fielder Paul Blair, eight-time Gold Glove shortstop Mark Belanger, and three-time Gold Glove second baseman Davey Johnson, all came into the Orioles minor league system when Dalton was its director. Future major league stars such as Bobby Grich and Don Baylor, joined the Oriole organization when Dalton was the organization's head of all baseball operations.

=== California Angels ===
Following the 1971 World Series loss to the Pittsburgh Pirates, on October 27, Dalton resigned as the Orioles' vice president and director of player personnel to accept a five-year contract to become executive vice president and general manager of the California Angels. He succeeded Dick Walsh, who had been dismissed one week prior on October 20. He acquired Nolan Ryan in a December 1971 trade with the New York Mets, ultimately considered one of the most uneven trades in baseball history (in the Angels favor), but during Dalton's six seasons in Anaheim the team never posted a winning record. He was stripped of his executive vice president position, which was assigned to Buzzie Bavasi, on October 24, 1977, when Gene Autry assumed a greater role in the team's baseball operations by naming himself president.

=== Milwaukee Brewers ===
One month later, on November 20, 1977, Dalton was hired as general manager of the Milwaukee Brewers. He succeeded Jim Baumer, who had resigned the previous night in a purge which also cost manager Alex Grammas and player development director Al Widmar their jobs. Dalton filled the managerial vacancy when he named Orioles' pitching coach George Bamberger the Brewers' new skipper two months later on January 20, 1978. Beginning the 1978 season, Milwaukee had a group of talented young players, such as Robin Yount (who had a .288 batting average with a .964 fielding percentage at shortstop in 1977), Cecil Cooper (who hit .300 with 20 home runs in 1977), and rookie Paul Molitor (who hit .347 in minor league play in 1977); but the nine-year-old franchise had never had a winning season, and finished the 1977 season with a 67–95 record.

But, under Dalton and Bamberger, the team quickly gelled into contenders in the American League East Division. From 1978-80, the Brewers won 93, 95 and 86 games respectively; finishing third, second and third in their division. In late 1980, Dalton and the St. Louis Cardinals' Whitey Herzog (both manager and general manager) engineered a trade that sent relief pitcher Rollie Fingers, catcher Ted Simmons, and starting pitcher Pete Vuckovich to the Brewers for David Green, Dave LaPoint, Sixto Lezcano and Lary Sorenson to the Cardinals. Fingers went on to win the American League Cy Young Award in 1981, and Vuckovich won the same award as the top American League pitcher the following year. Fingers and Simmons would also go on to be inducted into the Hall of Fame (as was Herzog).

By 1981, the Brewers made the playoffs in a strike-shortened season. In addition to winning the Cy Young Award, Fingers was named the league's most valuable player in 1981. Vuckovich tied for the league lead in wins (14). In 1982, the season did not start out auspiciously for the Brewers, and Dalton fired manager Buck Rodgers in early June, replacing him with Harvey Kuenn as interim manager. The move paid off for Dalton as the Brewers were 23–24 under Rodgers, but went on to finish the season 72–43 under Kuenn, winning the American League east title on the last day of the season over the Orioles, with whom they had been tied. In another move that helped the Brewers, Dalton had obtained future Hall of Fame starting pitcher Don Sutton in late August, who then went 4–1 for the Brewers. It was Sutton who defeated Jim Palmer and the Orioles in that final game to win the division for the Brewers.

After clinching the division title, Milwaukee won its first and only American League pennant (the Brewers moved to the National League Central Division in 1998). Not only did Vuckovich win the 1982 Cy Young Award with an 18–6 won-loss record, but Simmons had 23 home runs and 97 runs batted in (RBI), fifth best on the high scoring Brewers who hit .279 as a team, with 216 home runs and 891 runs scored. The offensively prodigious Brewers were nicknamed "Harvey's Wallbangers" after their manager.

In the 1982 World Series, the Brewers lost to Herzog's Cardinals in seven games. Fingers, who was selected as an All-Star in 1982 and had 29 saves during the regular season, was unavailable to pitch in the World Series due to an arm injury; while Green and LaPoint made important contributions for the Cardinals. Although they lost the World Series, for the second time in his career Dalton was selected as The Sporting News Executive of the Year.

The Brewers contended in 1983, with a record of 87–75 (finishing 5th in the division, 11 games behind the first place Orioles), but then began to struggle on the field with records below .500 from 1984-86. The team rebounded to third place in 1987 (91-71) and 1988 (87-75), but that was followed by fourth, sixth and fourth place finishes from 1989-91, and Dalton's position was weakened. He was relegated to a role as an advisor to Bud Selig (the Brewers owner and future baseball commissioner) on October 8, 1991. His special assistant Sal Bando was promoted to replace him under the title of senior vice president for baseball operations.

== Legacy ==
Dalton, who remained a consultant in the Milwaukee front office through his 1994 retirement, nevertheless was one of the most respected men in baseball, who had trained other successful general managers such as John Schuerholz, Lou Gorman and Dan Duquette, a fellow Amherst alumnus. Selig considered Dalton the best baseball mind of his generation. In the 2024 Dalton biography Leave While the Party's Good (a 2025 Seymour Medal finalist), author Lee Kluck provides a history of facts supporting the conclusion that Dalton's work as a general manager – reflecting a combination of respect for his players and staff, cutting edge use of analytics, focus on collective team building (which did not include the marketing and sales side of the business), and choosing players based on ability rather aiming to fill a specific position – was "groundbreaking and set the tone for modern GMs."

On July 24, 2003, Dalton was inducted into the Milwaukee Brewers Walk of Fame outside American Family Field, along with Brewers broadcaster Bob Uecker.

=== Record as general manager ===
Team	Year	Regular season					Postseason			
Team	Year	Games	Won	Lost	Win %	Finish	Won	Lost	Win %	Result
BAL	1966	160	97	63	.606	1st in AL	4	0	1.000	Won World Series (LAD)
BAL	1967	161	76	85	.472	6th in AL	—	—	—	—
BAL	1968	162	91	71	.562	2nd in AL	–	–	–	–
BAL	1969	162	109	53	.673	1st in AL East	4	4	.500	Lost World Series (NYM)
BAL	1970	162	108	54	.667	1st in AL East	7	1	.875	Won World Series (CIN)
BAL	1971	158	101	57	.639	1st in AL East	6	7	.462	Lost World Series (PIT)
BAL total		965	582	383	.603		21	12	.636	
CAL	1972	155	75	80	.484	5th in AL West	–	–	–	–
CAL	1973	162	79	83	.488	4th in AL West	–	–	–	–
CAL	1974	163	68	94	.420	6th in AL West	–	–	–	–
CAL	1975	161	72	89	.447	6th in AL West	–	–	–	–
CAL	1976	162	76	86	.469	4th in AL West	–	–	–	–
CAL	1977	162	74	88	.457	5th in AL West	–	–	–	–
CAL total		965	444	520	.461					
MIL	1978	162	93	69	.574	3rd in AL East	–	–	–	–
MIL	1979	161	95	66	.590	2nd in AL East	–	–	–	–
MIL	1980	162	86	76	.531	3rd in AL East	–	–	–	–
MIL	1981	56	31	25	.554	3rd in AL East	2	3	.400	Lost ALDS (NYY)
MIL	1981	53	31	22	.585	1st in AL East	2	3	.400	Lost ALDS (NYY)
MIL	1982	163	95	67	.586	1st in AL East	6	7	.462	Lost World Series (STL)
MIL	1983	162	87	75	.537	5th in AL East	–	–	–	–
MIL	1984	161	67	94	.416	7th in AL East	–	–	–	–
MIL	1985	161	71	90	.441	6th in AL East	–	–	–	–
MIL	1986	161	77	84	.478	6th in AL East	–	–	–	–
MIL	1987	162	91	71	.562	3rd in AL East	–	–	–	–
MIL	1988	162	87	75	.537	3rd in AL East	–	–	–	–
MIL	1989	162	81	81	.500	4th in AL East	–	–	–	–
MIL	1990	162	74	88	.457	6th in AL East	–	–	–	–
MIL	1991	162	83	79	.512	4th in AL East	–	–	–	
MIL total		2,212	1,149	1,062	.520		8	10	.444	
Total		4,142	2,175	1,965	.525		29	22	.569	

== Honors and awards ==
Dalton has received the following awards and honors, among others;

- The Sporting News executive of the year (1970 and 1982)
- Herb Armstrong Award (for contribution to the Orioles franchise by a non-uniform personnel making them worthy of inclusion in the Baltimore Orioles Hall of Fame) (1997)
- Inducted into the Milwaukee Brewers Walk of Fame (2003)
- Selected to the Milwaukee Brewers Wall of Honor (2018)

== Personal life ==
Dalton married Patricia Lyn Booker on July 9, 1960, with whom he had three daughters.

== Death ==
Harry Dalton died at age 77 in Scottsdale, Arizona, of complications from Lewy body disease, misdiagnosed as Parkinson's disease.
