= Harvey Kuenn =

American baseball player and manager (1930–1988)

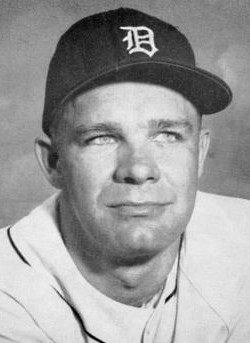
- Kuenn, circa 1959
- Outfielder / Shortstop
- Born: December 4, 1930; West Allis, Wisconsin, U.S.
- Died: February 28, 1988 (aged 57); Peoria, Arizona, U.S.
- Batted: Right Threw: Right

MLB debut
- September 6, 1952, for the Detroit Tigers

Last MLB appearance
- October 2, 1966, for the Philadelphia Phillies

MLB statistics
- Batting average: .303
- Hits: 2,092
- Home runs: 87
- Runs batted in: 671
- Managerial record: 160–118
- Winning %: .576
- Stats at Baseball Reference
- Managerial record at Baseball Reference

Teams
- As player: Detroit Tigers (1952–1959); Cleveland Indians (1960); San Francisco Giants (1961–1965); Chicago Cubs (1965–1966); Philadelphia Phillies (1966); As manager: Milwaukee Brewers (1975, 1982–1983); As coach: Milwaukee Brewers (1971–1982)

Career highlights and awards
- 10× All-Star (1953–1960²); AL Rookie of the Year (1953); AL batting champion (1959); Milwaukee Brewers Wall of Honor; American Family Field Walk of Fame

Harvey Edward Kuenn Jr. (/kiːn/ KEEN; December 4, 1930 – February 28, 1988) was an American professional baseball player, coach, manager and scout. He played in Major League Baseball (MLB) as a shortstop and outfielder, most prominently as a member of the Detroit Tigers where he won the 1953 American League Rookie of the Year Award and the 1959 American League batting championship. A ten-time All-Star, Kuenn also played for the Cleveland Indians, San Francisco Giants, Chicago Cubs, and Philadelphia Phillies. He retired as a player with over 2,000 hits and a lifetime batting average of .303.

After his playing career, he led his hometown team as the manager of the Milwaukee Brewers, winning the 1982 American League pennant and came within one game of winning the 1982 World Series. He later worked as a major league scout for the Brewers. Kuenn was inducted into the Milwaukee Brewers Walk of Fame in 2005, and the Milwaukee Brewers Wall of Honor in 2014.

== Early life ==
Kuenn was born on December 12, 1930, in West Allis, Wisconsin, but raised in neighboring Milwaukee and attended Lutheran High School. He was the only child born to German-Americans Harvey and Dorothy (Wrensch) Kuenn. He played baseball, football and basketball at Lutheran. He played quarterback, and once kicked (dropkicked) a 52-yard field goal for Lutheran in a football game, which is tied for the eighth-longest field goal in Wisconsin high school football history. He was also a star basketball player on teams that won three conference titles.

Kuenn played collegiate baseball at the University of Wisconsin–Madison, where he was a member of Delta Upsilon fraternity. As a junior in 1952, Kuenn was the Badgers captain and Most Valuable Player (MVP). In 1952, he was named an All-American and All-Big Ten at shortstop, leading the Big Ten conference with a .436 batting average and in five other offensive categories (runs batted in, runs, doubles, triples and hits). He had a .382 career batting average at Madison.

== Professional baseball ==
=== Detroit Tigers ===
Kuenn was signed by Detroit as an amateur free agent on June 9, 1952, after the collegiate baseball season ended. He was originally assigned to the Davenport Tigers of the Class B Illinois-Indiana-Iowa (Triple-I) League. The 21-year old Kuenn hit .340 in 63 games. This would be his only time spent in the minor leagues. Kuenn was named the starting shortstop after joining the Tigers late in the season, starting in 19 games and hitting .325 in 80 at bats, and had a .962 fielding percentage at shortstop.

In his first full season in 1953, he hit .308 with 94 runs and led the major leagues with 209 hits, setting a major league rookie record with 167 singles, leading the league in that category as well. Kuenn also led the league in at bats and plate appearances, and had the fourth best at bats per strikeout ratio. He received the American League Rookie of the Year and The Sporting News (TSN) Rookie of the Year awards. He received 23 of 24 possible votes from the Baseball Writers' Association of America. Also in that season, he received the first of his ten consecutive selections to the All-Star Game (with two All-Star Games in 1959 and 1960).

A line drive hitter who hit to all fields, Kuenn showed consistency in the next two seasons, compiling very similar numbers: he hit .306 with 81 runs and a league-leading 201 hits in 1954, then hit .306 with 101 runs and 190 hits in 1955. In 1954, he struck out only 13 times in a league-leading 656 at bats, second only to Nellie Fox in at bats to strikeout ratio (50.5). During his early years with the Tigers, he was mentored defensively at shortstop by Johnny Pesky and Joe Gordon. In 1956, he set career highs with 12 home runs and 88 runs batted in (RBI) and raised his average to .332, surpassed only by Mickey Mantle (.353) and Ted Williams (.345) in the batting race.

A year later, he slumped badly to .277; the only time he hit less than .300 for the Tigers. But he rebounded in 1958 with a .319 average, ending third in the league behind Williams (.328) and Pete Runnels (.322), and surpassing Al Kaline, Vic Power, Bob Cerv, Mantle, Rocky Colavito, Minnie Miñoso and Nellie Fox. In that season, he switched to the outfield, where he played all three positions over the remainder of his career.

=== Later playing career ===
After winning the American League batting crown in 1959 with a .353 average, being named to both all-star games, and coming in 8th in MVP voting, Kuenn was traded to Cleveland for Rocky Colavito before the 1960 season. Colavito had tied Harmon Killebrew for the 1959 American League home run title, with 42, and was 4th in MVP voting. (The trade is often referred to by Cleveland fans as "the curse of Rocky Colavito".). With the Indians, playing in right field, Kuenn hit .308 in the 1960 season, high average on the team. It was his last all-star season, and only year in Cleveland.

In December 1960, Cleveland traded Kuenn to the San Francisco Giants for Johnny Antonelli and Willie Kirkland. In 1961, he played right field, left field and third based for the Giants, hitting a then career low .265. In 1962, led by Willie Mays, the Giants won the National League pennant, and Kuenn rebounded with a .304 average. He would never hit above .300 again as a full-time player. Kuenn played principally in left field, though he also started 29 games at third base. The Giants lost to the Yankees 4–3 in the 1962 World Series.

Kuenn played two more years with the Giants (1963-64). He hit .290 in 1963, but had less than 500 plate appearances for the first time. In 1964, his average fell to .262 and his playing time again decreased. On May 29, 1965, the Giants traded Kuenn, Ed Bailey and Bob Hendley to the Chicago Cubs for Dick Bertell and Len Gabrielson. Kuenn played in only 54 games for the Cubs, with a .217 batting average. After playing only three games for the Cubs in 1966, his rights were sold to the Philadelphia Phillies. He played in 86 games, batting .296, but was released at the end of the season. He retired before the 1967 season began.

== Legacy ==
In a 15-season playing career, Kuenn was a .303 hitter with 87 home runs and 671 RBIs in 1833 games. He led the AL in hits four times and doubles three times, and finished with 2,092 hits. Playing all three outfield positions and the infield except catcher and second base, Kuenn recorded a .966 fielding percentage. In addition to his ten all-star game appearances, from 1953 to 1962, Kuenn was voted in the top-10 for American League most valuable player three times, and the top-20 seven times.

He finished his career with a 17.1 at bats to strike out ratio. Hall of Fame manager Casey Stengel said that Kuenn was one of the "'most dangerous hitters in baseball. The guy can hurt you a million ways. He has no weakness at the plate that I have ever noticed.'”

Kuenn had the dubious distinction of making the final out in two of Sandy Koufax's four no-hitters—in 1963 and 1965. In the former, the final out was on a ground ball back to Koufax. In the latter, he struck out for the final out in Koufax's perfect game.

Kuenn was hired as the Milwaukee Brewers batting coach in 1971. The Brewers activated Kuenn as a player on September 1, 1971, for the sake of his pension benefits. He never appeared in a game, however.

== Milwaukee Brewers coaching/managing career ==
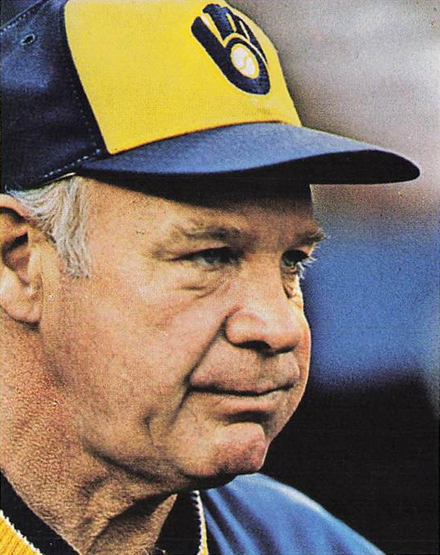
1983 card of Kuenn as manager of the Milwaukee Brewers

Kuenn remained as the Brewers hitting coach from 1971 to 1982. When manager Del Crandall was fired with two games to go in the 1975 season, Kuenn served as an interim manager. He experienced a series of medical complications beginning in the mid-1970s, including heart and stomach surgeries, and in February 1980, he had his right leg amputated just below the knee after a blood clot cut circulation. He returned to coaching only six months after the operation, with a prosthetic leg.

After 47 games into the Brewers 1982 season, the team was 23–24. General manager Harry Dalton fired manager Buck Rodgers, and made Kuenn interim manager. Under Kuenn, the Brewers went on to finish the season with a 72–43 record, winning the American League east title on the last day of the season over the Baltimore Orioles, with whom they had been tied. Many Brewers players believed Kuenn's managerial philosophy led to their success, as he encouraged his players to relax and have fun while playing the game. As a team, the Brewers had a .279 batting average, with 216 home runs and 891 runs scored. The Brewers were nicknamed "Harvey's Wallbangers" after their manager.

In 1982, Kuenn managed the Milwaukee Brewers to their first World Series appearance. He was selected by the Associated Press as the AL Manager of the Year, after taking the Brewers in June from a 23–24 start to the AL East title with a 95–67 overall record. Milwaukee then won the AL pennant after rallying from a 2–0 deficit and beating the California Angels in the best-of-five American League Championship Series. They ultimately lost the 1982 World Series to the St. Louis Cardinals in seven games. Because of an injury, the Brewers top relief pitcher, future Hall of Famer Rollie Fingers, was unavailable for the World Series. Fingers was the 1981 American League Cy Young Award winner and Most Valuable Player, and had 29 saves during an All-Star 1982 season.

In addition to Fingers, the 1982 Brewers' roster included All-Stars Cecil Cooper and Ben Oglivie, American League home run leader Gorman Thomas, 1982 Cy Young Award winner Pete Vuckovich, and future Hall of Famers Paul Molitor, Ted Simmons and Robin Yount (who was also the 1982 AL MVP). As a hitting instructor, Kuenn had worked with Yount, Molitor, Thomas and Oglivie, as well as Brewers players Charlie Moore, Sixto Lezcano and Jim Gantner.

Kuenn was fired as manager after the Brewers finished fifth in the AL East with an otherwise respectable 87–75 record in 1983, replaced by Rene Lachemann (who was fired after one year). The 1983 Brewers had been without the services of Fingers for the entire year, and Vuckovich until August. Overall Kuenn compiled a 160–118 managerial record.

After being replaced as manager, Kuenn worked as a major league scout and minor league hitting consultant for the Brewers, until his death in 1988.

=== Managerial record ===
Team	Year	Regular season					Postseason			
Team	Year	Games	Won	Lost	Win %	Finish	Won	Lost	Win %	Result
MIL	1975	1	1	0	1.000	5th in AL East	–	–	–	
MIL	1982	116	72	43	.626	1st in AL East	6	6	.500	Lost World Series (STL)
MIL	1983	162	87	75	.537	5th in AL East	–	–	–	
Total		279	160	118	.576		6	6	.500	

== Honors ==
In addition to being named American League manager of the year and rookie of the year, Kuenn was inducted into the Wisconsin Athletic Hall of Fame, and the University of Wisconsin Athletic Hall of Fame (1991). In 2005, he was honored with inclusion in the Milwaukee Brewers Walk of Fame at American Family Field. He was part of the inaugural class included in the Brewers Wall of Honor in 2014.

== Personal life ==
On October 29, 1955, he married former Miss Wisconsin 1954, Dixie Ann Sarchet in her hometown of Stevens Point, Wisconsin. They were divorced in 1971. In 1974, Kuenn married Audrey Cesar, with hall of fame broadcaster Bob Uecker as his best man. Audrey Kuenn remained an ongoing presence with the Milwaukee Brewers, even after Kuenn's death. Her family's tavern, Cesar's Inn, was a gathering place for the team during Kuenn's managing days. His son with Dixie, Harvey Kuenn III, played minor league baseball and became a Brewers scout for a number of years.

During the off-seasons, Kuenn worked at a West Allis bank. After he retired as a player in 1967, Kuenn worked as the ten o’clock sports anchor with WVTV in Milwaukee. The expansion Montreal Expos manager Gene Mauch offered Kuenn a coaching job in 1969, but his family did not want to move there.

== Death ==
Kuenn died on February 28, 1988, of complications from heart disease and diabetes at his home in Peoria, Arizona, at the age of 57. The Brewers wore a patch with his initials during the 1988 season to commemorate him. The patch was a blue circle with a yellow border, a bat running diagonally through the circle, with Kuenn's initials. His eulogy was delivered by Bob Uecker.

== See also ==
- List of Major League Baseball career hits leaders
- List of Major League Baseball batting champions
- List of Major League Baseball annual doubles leaders
- Major League Baseball titles leaders
