= The Mustache Gang =

1972 Oakland Athletic's baseball team

The Mustache Gang is a term coined for the 1972 Oakland Athletics team; the Athletics broke traditionally conservative baseball views by sporting mustaches. From the change in American men's fashion away from facial hair in the 1920s to the early 1970s, there had only been two baseball players who had facial hair during the regular season: Stanley "Frenchy" Bordagaray of the Brooklyn Dodgers, who was then ordered to shave by his manager, and Wally Schang of the Philadelphia Athletics.

This changed when A's outfielder Reggie Jackson showed up to spring training with a fully grown mustache which would later be thought of as the catalyst that sparked the move away from the conservative baseball era. This move led to that year's World Series to be dubbed "Hairs vs. Squares", as the Oakland A's Mustache Gang faced off with the conservatively clean-shaven Cincinnati Reds.

== The origins ==
Before 1972, baseball was traditionally conservative, where all players were clean shaven. During this time, there had even been an unwritten rule that frowned upon players with facial hair. There had been some baseball players who grew mustaches, but all showed up cleanly-shaven (although long sideburns were acceptable) at the start of the regular season, either by their own decision or as ordered by their managers.

The Mustache Gang was started in 1972 when All-Star outfielder Reggie Jackson showed up to spring training with a mustache, claiming he would have a fully grown beard at the start of the regular season. Initially, this assertion was not taken well by the organization and according to Mike Hegan, "(Owner) [Charlie] (Finley) told (manager) Dick (Williams) to tell Reggie to shave it off. And Dick told Reggie to shave off, and Reggie told Dick where he could shove it."

In a hope to avoid a large conflict, Finley decided to take a reverse-psychology approach, knowing Jackson thought of himself as an individual, he hoped that if a couple other players decided to join him in sporting facial hair, then he would give up and shave off his beard. In an attempt to do just that, Finley asked A's pitchers Jim "Catfish" Hunter, Rollie Fingers (who came to be known for his long handlebar mustache), Darold Knowles, and Bob Locker to all grow a mustache. This backfired and lead to the birth of The Mustache Gang.

As the mustache spread in popularity among the team, owner Finley and the other management began to come around to the new look. Finley had come around so quickly, he also grew one and encouraged the other members of the team to do the same. He even dubbed that year's "Father's Day" as "Mustache Day" and offered a $300 reward to anyone who could grow a mustache by then. Once "Mustache Day" rolled around on Sunday, June 18, all 25 players on the Oakland A's roster had a mustache, even manager Dick Williams decided to grow one. To further promote his team's new look, every fan that showed up to the Oakland Coliseum that day wearing a mustache gained admittance for free; this numbered about 7,000 of the 26,210 in attendance, and all were treated to a 9–0 shutout win over Cleveland.

As though to irritate the other owners even more, Finley took it one step further by making his team's uniforms different from the rest of the league, the traditional baseball pants and black and grey jersey was replaced with a "two-tone uniform". Meaning, the players would wear a green and gold pullover shirts on top, along with the traditional white pants and elastic belts. This created a baseball team unlike any other in its time.

Members of the 1972 Oakland A's
| Name | Position |
|---|---|
| Charlie O. Finley | Owner |
| Dick Williams | Manager |
| Dave Duncan | Catcher |
| Gene Tenace | Catcher-First Baseman |
| Mike Epstein | First Baseman |
| Tim Cullen | Second Baseman |
| Dick Green | Second Baseman |
| Bert Campaneris | Shortstop |
| Sal Bando | Third Baseman |
| Mike Hegan | First Baseman |
| Don Mincher | First Baseman |
| Ted Kubiak | Utility Infielder |
| Dal Maxvill | Utility Infielder |
| Joe Rudi | Left Fielder |
| Reggie Jackson | Center Fielder-Right Fielder |
| Matty Alou | Right Fielder |
| Jim "Catfish" Hunter | Starting Pitcher |
| Ken Holtzman | Starting Pitcher |
| John "Blue Moon" Odom | Starting Pitcher |
| Vida Blue | Starting Pitcher |
| Dave Hamilton | Relief Pitcher-Starting Pitcher |
| Darold Knowles | Relief Pitcher |
| Joel Horlen | Relief Pitcher |
| Bob Locker | Relief Pitcher |
| Rollie Fingers | Relief Pitcher |

== Hall of Famers ==
Of the 25 members of The Mustache Gang, four of them have been inducted into the Baseball Hall of Fame. Three of the four were players, Reggie Jackson, Catfish Hunter, and Rollie Fingers. The fourth member is manager, Dick Williams.

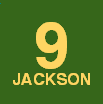
Reggie
Jackson
OF

Retired
May 22, 2004
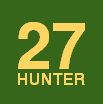
Catfish
Hunter
P

Retired
June 9, 1991
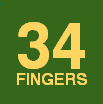
Rollie
Fingers
P

Retired
July 5, 1993
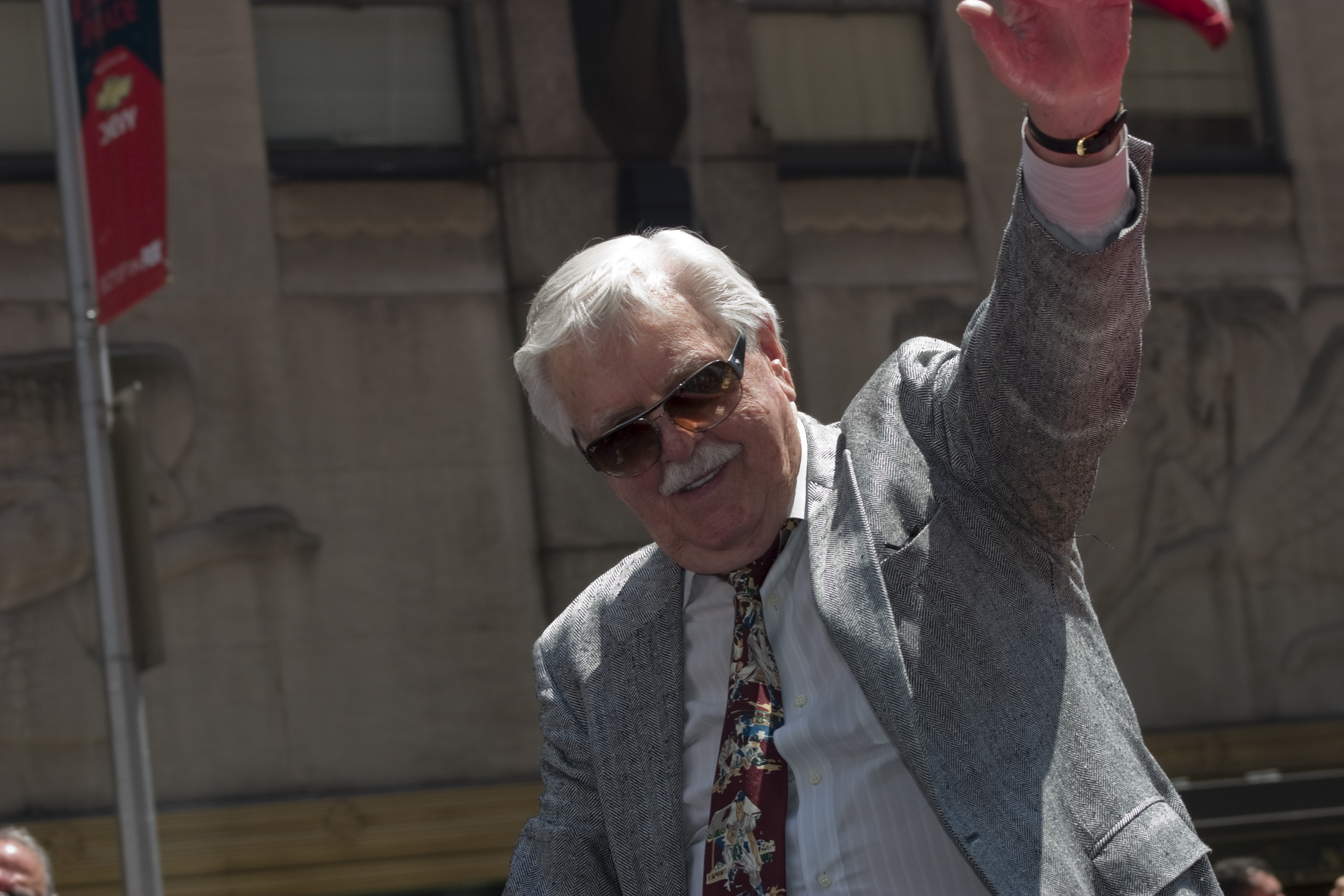
Dick
Williams
OF 3B M

Retired
July 27, 2008
