= 1972 Major League Baseball postseason =

1972 Major League Baseball playoffs

Tournament details
- Dates: October 7–22, 1972
- Teams: 4

Final positions
- Champions: Oakland Athletics (6th title)
- Runners-up: Cincinnati Reds

Tournament statistics
- Games played: 17
- Attendance: 787,644 (46,332 per game)
- Most HRs: Gene Tenace (OAK) (4)
- Most SBs: Bobby Tolan (CIN) (5)
- Most Ks (as pitcher): Catfish Hunter (OAK) (20)

Awards
- MVP: Gene Tenace (OAK)

The 1972 Major League Baseball postseason was the playoff tournament of Major League Baseball for the 1972 season. The winners of each division advance to the postseason and face each other in a League Championship Series to determine the pennant winners that face each other in the World Series.

In the American League, the Detroit Tigers made their second postseason appearance in the last five years, and the Oakland Athletics made their second straight postseason appearance. This was Detroit’s last postseason appearance until 1984.

In the National League, the Cincinnati Reds returned for the second time in three years, and the Pittsburgh Pirates made their third straight postseason appearance. As of 2026, this is the only time the Pirates made the postseason after winning the World Series the previous year.

The playoffs began on October 7, 1972, and concluded on October 22, 1972, with the Oakland Athletics defeating the Cincinnati Reds in seven games in the 1972 World Series. It was the Athletics' sixth title in franchise history and first since 1930, when the team was still based in Philadelphia.

== Teams ==
American League Teams National League Teams

The following teams qualified for the postseason:

=== American League ===
- Detroit Tigers – 86–70, AL East champions
- Oakland Athletics – 93–62, AL West champions

=== National League ===
- Pittsburgh Pirates – 96–59, NL East champions
- Cincinnati Reds – 95–59, NL West champions

== Playoff bracket ==
League Championship Series (ALCS, NLCS)
East	Detroit	2
West	Oakland	3
East	Pittsburgh	2
West	Cincinnati	3

World Series
AL	Oakland	4
NL	Cincinnati	3

== American League Championship Series ==
=== Detroit Tigers vs. Oakland Athletics ===
Oakland won the series, 3–2.

Game	Date	Score	Location	Time	Attendance
1	October 7	Detroit Tigers – 2, Oakland Athletics – 3 (11)	Oakland-Alameda County Coliseum	3:00	29,566
2	October 8	Detroit Tigers – 0, Oakland Athletics – 5	Oakland-Alameda County Coliseum	2:37	31,068
3	October 10	Oakland Athletics – 0, Detroit Tigers – 3	Tiger Stadium	2:27	41,156
4	October 11	Oakland Athletics – 3, Detroit Tigers – 4 (10)	Tiger Stadium	3:04	37,615
5	October 12	Oakland Athletics – 2, Detroit Tigers – 1	Tiger Stadium	2:48	50,276

This was the first postseason meeting between the Tigers and Athletics. In one of the most tightly contested series in postseason history, the Athletics narrowly defeated the Tigers in five games to advance to the World Series for the first time since 1931, when the team was still based out of Philadelphia (in the process denying a rematch of the 1940 World Series between the Tigers and Reds).

Game 1 was the first of two extra-inning contests, and it was won by the Athletics as Gene Tenace scored the winning run in the bottom of the eleventh off a wild throw from Al Kaline. Blue Moon Odom pitched a three-hit complete game shutout in Game 2 as the Athletics took a 2–0 series lead headed to Detroit. Game 2 was marred by controversy - Athletics shortstop Bert Campaneris came to bat, having had three hits, two runs scored, and two stolen bases in his first three at-bats in the game. Tigers relief pitcher Lerrin LaGrow's first pitch hit Campaneris in the ankle; he staggered for a moment, glared at LaGrow and then flung his bat toward the mound. The bat spiraled at LaGrow five feet (1.5 m) off the ground, but LaGrow ducked, and the bat narrowly missed him, landing a few feet behind the mound. The benches cleared, and while there were no punches thrown or other incidents involving players, Tigers manager Billy Martin had to be restrained by umpires and teammates to prevent him from going after Campaneris. Both LaGrow and Campaneris were suspended for the rest of the ALCS. In Game 3, Joe Coleman pitched a seven-hit complete-game shutout as the Tigers got on the board in the series.

Game 4 was the most memorable of the series - the game remained tied at one after nine innings, and in the top of the tenth, the Athletics took a 3–1 lead, and it appeared as if the Tigers were finished. However, in the bottom of the tenth, the Tigers rallied, as Kaline and Dick McAuliffe hit back-to-back singles. Oakland relief pitcher Joe Horlen then threw a wild pitch which advanced the runners to second and third and he walked Gates Brown to load the bases with no outs. Bill Freehan then grounded an apparent double play ball to third, but the inexperienced Tenace at second dropped Sal Bando's throw. McAuliffe scored and everybody was safe. Dave Hamilton then relieved Horlen and promptly walked Norm Cash to tie the game, and then gave up a walk-off single to Jim Northrup, a ball hit over right fielder Matty Alou's head (the outfield was drawn in), scoring Brown with the winning run as the Tigers evened the series and forced a decisive fifth game.

In Game 5, the Tigers took an early lead in the bottom of the first, but the Athletics would put two unanswered runs on the board in the second and fourth innings respectively to secure the pennant. This was the first playoff series won by the Athletics since the 1930 World Series.

This was the first of three consecutive AL pennants won by the Athletics, and the first of six total pennants that the team would win during their time in Oakland. They would win it again in 1973 and 1974, both coming against the Baltimore Orioles.

The Tigers would eventually return to the ALCS in 1984, and swept the Kansas City Royals en route to a World Series title.

Both the Athletics and Tigers would meet again in the ALCS in 2006, as well as the ALDS in 2012 and 2013, with the Tigers winning all three meetings.

== National League Championship Series ==
=== Cincinnati Reds vs. Pittsburgh Pirates ===
Cincinnati won the series, 3–2.

Game	Date	Score	Location	Time	Attendance
1	October 7	Cincinnati Reds – 1, Pittsburgh Pirates – 5	Three Rivers Stadium	1:57	50,476
2	October 8	Cincinnati Reds – 5, Pittsburgh Pirates – 3	Three Rivers Stadium	2:43	50,584
3	October 9	Pittsburgh Pirates – 3, Cincinnati Reds – 2	Riverfront Stadium	2:23	52,420
4	October 10	Pittsburgh Pirates – 1, Cincinnati Reds – 7	Riverfront Stadium	1:58	39,447
5	October 11	Pittsburgh Pirates – 3, Cincinnati Reds – 4	Riverfront Stadium	2:19	41,887

This was a rematch of the 1970 NLCS, which the Reds won in a 3–0 sweep before falling in the World Series. The Reds knocked off the defending World Series champion Pirates in five games to return to the World Series for the second time in three years.

The Pirates cruised to a 5–1 victory in Game 1 off an eight-inning performance from Steve Blass. In Game 2, the Reds evened the series thanks to relief pitcher Tom Hall stopping a rally by the Pirates. When the series shifted to Cincinnati, the Pirates took Game 3 by a 3–2 score thanks to an RBI groundout by Manny Sanguillén. In Game 4, the Reds blew out the Pirates as Ross Grimsley pitched a two-hit complete-game.

Game 5 was the nailbiter of the series - the Pirates led 3–2 going into the bottom of the ninth and were three outs away from winning back-to-back NL pennants. Then, Reds' catcher Johnny Bench hit a solo home run to tie the game. Then, Tony Pérez singled and was replaced by pinch-runner George Foster. Denis Menke followed with another single as Foster moved to second base. With the count 2–0 on César Gerónimo, Pirates' closer Dave Giusti was replaced with Game 2 starter Bob Moose. Geronimo's fly ball out advanced Foster to third, but Moose induced shortstop Darrell Chaney to pop out as Foster stayed at third. Just when it looked like Moose may wiggle out of a tough two-on, no out situation, he uncorked a wild pitch to pinch-hitter Hal McRae, scoring Foster with the winning run, securing the pennant for the Reds. It was the first time a postseason series ended on a wild pitch since the 1927 World Series, in which the Pirates were swept by the New York Yankees. Game 5 would ultimately be Roberto Clemente’s final postseason game, as he died in a plane crash on New Year's Eve.

The Reds returned to the NLCS the next year, but were upset by the 82-win New York Mets in five games. They would win their next pennant in 1975 over the Pirates again in a sweep en route to a World Series title.

This was the first of three consecutive losses for the Pirates in the NLCS. Following their heartbreaking loss to the Reds, the Pirates returned to the NLCS two years later, only to lose to the Los Angeles Dodgers in four games. They also made the NLCS again in 1975, and were once again defeated by the Reds in a sweep. The Pirates would eventually win the pennant again in 1979 over the Reds in a sweep en route to their most recent championship.

== 1972 World Series ==
=== Oakland Athletics (AL) vs. Cincinnati Reds (NL) ===
Oakland won the series, 4–3.

Game	Date	Score	Location	Time	Attendance
1	October 14	Oakland Athletics – 3, Cincinnati Reds – 2	Riverfront Stadium	2:18	52,918
2	October 15	Oakland Athletics – 2, Cincinnati Reds – 1	Riverfront Stadium	2:26	53,224
3	October 18†	Cincinnati Reds – 1, Oakland Athletics – 0	Oakland–Alameda County Coliseum	2:24	49,410
4	October 19	Cincinnati Reds – 2, Oakland Athletics – 3	Oakland–Alameda County Coliseum	2:06	49,410
5	October 20	Cincinnati Reds – 5, Oakland Athletics – 4	Oakland–Alameda County Coliseum	2:26	49,410
6	October 21	Oakland Athletics – 1, Cincinnati Reds – 8	Riverfront Stadium	2:21	52,737
7	October 22	Oakland Athletics – 3, Cincinnati Reds – 2	Riverfront Stadium	2:50	56,040

†: postponed from October 17 due to rain

This was the first World Series matchup between the Reds and Athletics, as well as the first World Series since 1968 to not feature the Baltimore Orioles. The Athletics defeated the Reds in seven games to win their first title since 1930, when the team was still based in Philadelphia.

The Athletics took Game 1 thanks to a go-ahead solo home run from catcher Gene Tenace in the top of the fifth. In Game 2, Catfish Hunter pitched eight innings of shutout ball as the Athletics took Game 2 to go up 2–0 in the series headed to Oakland. In Game 3, Jack Billingham pitched eight shutout innings and Clay Carroll earned a shutout save as the Reds shutout the Athletics 1–0 to avoid a sweep. In Game 4, the Reds held a 2–1 lead going into the bottom of the ninth and were on the verge of evening the series. Then, the Athletics strung together four consecutive hits to score two unanswered runs, and took a 3–1 series lead, capped off by an RBI single by Ángel Mangual in the bottom of the ninth. However, the Athletics weren’t out of the woods just yet. Pete Rose hit a game-winning RBI single in a Reds’ victory in Game 5 to send the series back to Cincinnati. In Game 6, the Reds blew out the Athletics to force a seventh game. However, the Athletics, thanks again to Hunter and Fingers, narrowly prevailed by a 3–2 score to secure the title. This was the first championship of the four major North American sports leagues won by a team from the San Francisco Bay Area.

The Athletics' victory marked the start of a three-peat dynasty for the franchise, and was the first of four championships the team won during their time in Oakland. The Athletics returned to the World Series the next year, and defeated the New York Mets in seven games to repeat as champions.

As of 2026, this is the last time the Reds lost the World Series. They would return in 1975, and defeated the Boston Red Sox in seven games to end a 35-year championship drought after being seven outs away from elimination in Game 7.

The Reds and Athletics would meet again in the 1990 World Series, where the Reds shockingly upset the Athletics in a 4-game sweep in what would ultimately be the A’s last World Series appearance in Oakland.

== Broadcasting ==
NBC televised all postseason games nationally in the United States. Each team's local broadcaster also televised coverage of LCS games.
