= 1972 American League Championship Series =

4th edition of Major League Baseball's American League Championship Series

Team (Wins)	Managers	Season
Oakland Athletics (3)	Dick Williams	93–62, .600, GA: 5½
Detroit Tigers (2)	Billy Martin	86–70, .551, GA: ½
- Dates: October 7–12
- Umpires: Red Flaherty; Nestor Chylak (crew chief); Johnny Rice; Don Denkinger; Larry Barnett; Art Frantz

Broadcast
- Television: NBC; WJBK-TV (DET)
- TV announcers: NBC: Curt Gowdy and Tony Kubek (in Oakland); Jim Simpson and Sandy Koufax (in Detroit); WJBK-TV: George Kell and Larry Osterman
- Radio: KEEN (OAK); WJR (DET)
- Radio announcers: KEEN: Monte Moore and Jim Woods; WJR: Ernie Harwell and Ray Lane

The 1972 American League Championship Series was the best-of-five semifinal series in Major League Baseball’s (MLB) 1972 postseason between the Oakland Athletics and the Detroit Tigers for the right to go to the 1972 World Series. The fourth edition of the ALCS was held from October 7 to October 12.

The first two games were played at the Oakland-Alameda County Coliseum, and the final three at Tiger Stadium. In each of the first four games, the home team prevailed; the Athletics won the deciding fifth game 2–1 on the road to take their first American League pennant since 1931.

== Overview ==
The Athletics won the first two games of the series at home, and one of this series' most memorable moments came in the seventh inning of Game 2. Oakland shortstop Bert Campaneris came to bat, having had three hits, two runs scored, and two stolen bases in his first three at-bats in the game. Detroit reliever Lerrin LaGrow's first pitch hit Campaneris in the ankle; he staggered for a moment, glared at LaGrow and then flung his bat toward the mound. The bat spiraled at LaGrow five feet (1.5 m) off the ground, but LaGrow ducked, and the bat narrowly missed him, landing a few feet behind the mound. The benches cleared, and while there were no punches thrown or other incidents involving players, Tigers manager Billy Martin had to be restrained by umpires and teammates to prevent him from going after Campaneris. Both LaGrow and Campaneris were suspended for the rest of the ALCS. Interestingly, this was a rare case where a manager, in this case Billy Martin, would manage in the postseason against a team that they either once managed or would later manage as he did for the Oakland Athletics from 1980 through 1982.

After Game 2, the Series moved to Detroit, where the Tigers fought back and won the next two. Game 4 was one of the best of the early LCS era, going ten innings, with the Tigers pulling out the victory. After it was 1–1 at the end of nine innings, the Athletics scored two runs in the top of the tenth, and it looked as if the series was over. However, the Tigers responded with three runs to win, 4–3. Detroit scored on two singles, a walk, and an error on a potential double play grounder which produced the first run.

With the bases loaded, Norm Cash walked, forcing in the tying run. The Athletics' infield and outfield were positioned shallow for a play at the plate; Jim Northrup hit a deep fly ball off Dave Hamilton to drive in the winning run.

In Game 5, the starting pitchers were Blue Moon Odom of the Athletics and Woodie Fryman of the Tigers. In the second inning on a double steal, A's center fielder and cleanup hitter Reggie Jackson scored from third base but was injured and was out for the season. After two innings, the game was 1–1. But by the fourth, it was clear runs wouldn't come easy. When George Hendrick, Jackson's replacement, reached base on a disputed umpire's safe call (replays showed he was in fact apparently out) and scored on a Gene Tenace RBI single, that proved decisive. By the ninth inning, Odom and Vida Blue had combined to pitch seven scoreless innings. With the Athletics up 2–1, it came down to the bottom of the ninth, as the Tigers faced Blue. Norm Cash singled, but that was it as Tony Taylor flied to center for the final out. Odom got the win, Blue got the save, and the Athletics were a World Series team for the first time in Oakland, and won the first of three straight American League pennants.

== Summary ==
=== Detroit Tigers vs. Oakland Athletics ===
Oakland won the series, 3–2.

Game	Date	Score	Location	Time	Attendance
1	October 7	Detroit Tigers – 2, Oakland Athletics – 3 (11)	Oakland-Alameda County Coliseum	3:00	29,566
2	October 8	Detroit Tigers – 0, Oakland Athletics – 5	Oakland-Alameda County Coliseum	2:37	31,068
3	October 10	Oakland Athletics – 0, Detroit Tigers – 3	Tiger Stadium	2:27	41,156
4	October 11	Oakland Athletics – 3, Detroit Tigers – 4 (10)	Tiger Stadium	3:04	37,615
5	October 12	Oakland Athletics – 2, Detroit Tigers – 1	Tiger Stadium	2:48	50,276

== Game summaries ==
=== Game 1 ===
October 7, 1972 1:00 pm (PT) at Oakland-Alameda County Coliseum in Oakland, California
Team	1	2	3	4	5	6	7	8	9	10	11	R	H	E
Detroit	0	1	0	0	0	0	0	0	0	0	1	2	6	2
Oakland	0	0	1	0	0	0	0	0	0	0	2	3	10	1
WP: Rollie Fingers (1–0) LP: Mickey Lolich (0–1); Home runs: DET: Norm Cash (1), Al Kaline (1); OAK: None

Game 1 pitted ace pitchers Catfish Hunter for the Athletics and Mickey Lolich for the Tigers, and, as expected, both were brilliant. Norm Cash homered to give the Tigers a 1–0 lead in the second inning, and the A's tied it in the third on a Joe Rudi sacrifice fly.

The score remained at 1–1 as the Tigers threatened in their half of the ninth. Duke Sims led off with a double off Hunter. Vida Blue came on in relief to pitch to left-handed hitting Norm Cash. Cash laid down a sacrifice bunt, but reached first when second baseman Ted Kubiak, covering first, dropped Sal Bando's throw. Sims reached third. Rollie Fingers then came in to face pinch hitter Gates Brown and got him on a foul pop fly. Jim Northrup then bounced into a 4–6–3 double play to end the threat.

Al Kaline gave the Tigers a 2–1 lead in the eleventh with a homer off Fingers and looked like a hero at that point. In the bottom of the 11th, Lolich gave up back-to-back singles to Sal Bando and Mike Epstein. Chuck Seelbach relieved Lolich. Gene Tenace attempted a sacrifice bunt, but third baseman Aurelio Rodríguez pounced on it and forced Blue Moon Odom, running for Bando, at third. Tigers shortstop Ed Brinkman then fired to first, his throw pulling Dick McAuliffe covering first off the bag. McAuliffe appeared to tag Tenace out, but he was called safe. Gonzalo Marquez pinch hit for Dal Maxvill and grounded a base hit to right, scoring Mike Hegan, running for Epstein, and tying the game. Tenace attempted to advance to third, and Kaline's throw from right field skipped past Rodriguez, allowing Tenace to score and win the game for the Athletics.

=== Game 2 ===
October 8, 1972 1:00 pm (PT) at Oakland-Alameda County Coliseum in Oakland, California
Team	1	2	3	4	5	6	7	8	9	R	H	E
Detroit	0	0	0	0	0	0	0	0	0	0	3	1
Oakland	1	0	0	0	4	0	0	0	X	5	8	0
WP: Blue Moon Odom (1–0) LP: Woodie Fryman (0–1)

Bert Campaneris was a sparkplug from the start. He led off the game for the Athletics with a single off Woodie Fryman and promptly stole second and third. Joe Rudi then batted him in with a one-out single.

The Athletics plated four more runs in the fifth when George Hendrick pinch-hit a single and went to second on a Blue Moon Odom sacrifice. Campaneris singled Hendrick to third and Matty Alou singled him in. Chris Zachary relieved Fryman and threw two wild pitches, scoring Campaneris and sending Alou to third. After Rudi walked, Reggie Jackson blasted a two-run double to make it 5–0.

Odom got the win for the Athletics, who now had a 2–0 lead, but would play without Campaneris for the remainder of the Championship Series, on account of a suspension he was issued due to the bat-throwing incident described in the overview above.

=== Game 3 ===
October 10, 1972 1:30 pm (ET) at Tiger Stadium in Detroit, Michigan
Team	1	2	3	4	5	6	7	8	9	R	H	E
Oakland	0	0	0	0	0	0	0	0	0	0	7	0
Detroit	0	0	0	2	0	0	0	1	X	3	8	1
WP: Joe Coleman (1–0) LP: Ken Holtzman (0–1); Home runs: OAK: None; DET: Bill Freehan (1)

Joe Coleman put the Tigers back into the series by throwing a complete-game, seven-hit shutout, striking out a then ALCS record 14 batters. Coleman was aided by a two-run single in the fourth by Ike Brown and a homer by Bill Freehan in the eighth.

=== Game 4 ===
October 11, 1972 1:30 pm (ET) at Tiger Stadium in Detroit, Michigan
Team	1	2	3	4	5	6	7	8	9	10	R	H	E
Oakland	0	0	0	0	0	0	1	0	0	2	3	9	2
Detroit	0	0	1	0	0	0	0	0	0	3	4	10	1
WP: John Hiller (1–0) LP: Bob Locker (0–1); Home runs: OAK: Mike Epstein (1); DET: Dick McAuliffe (1)

Game 4 was the most exciting of the series; for eight innings, it was a tight pitching duel between Game 1 aces Catfish Hunter and Mickey Lolich. The only runs across were a Dick McAuliffe homer for the Tigers in the third and a Mike Epstein homer for the Athletics -- Oakland's only home run in the series -- in the seventh.

In the sixth, Athletics second baseman Dick Green was hurt on a hard slide by Norm Cash trying to break up a double play. Athletics manager Dick Williams moved catcher Gene Tenace to second because no other healthy players were available. Tenace had last played second base in high school, and this inexperience was soon costly.

The Tigers threatened in both the eighth and ninth innings. In the eighth, McAuliffe walked and was sacrificed to second by Al Kaline. Mickey Stanley reached on an infield hit, sending McAuliffe to third. Rollie Fingers relieved Hunter and Billy Martin called for a suicide squeeze that failed and McAuliffe was thrown out trying to score. Fingers then struck out Bill Freehan for the final out. In the ninth, with two outs, Tony Taylor doubled and Vida Blue intentionally walked Aurelio Rodríguez. Blue then retired pinch-hitter Willie Horton on a fly to center.

In the tenth, the Athletics took a two-run lead when Gonzalo Marquez continued his pinch-hitting heroics with a one-out single. Matty Alou doubled home Marquez and went to third on the throw home. Ted Kubiak then hit a bloop single to right with Alou scoring for a 3–1 lead. After Joe Rudi was retired, Reggie Jackson reached on a throwing error by Rodriguez with Kubiak reaching third. However, no more Athletics runs scored as Sal Bando made the last out of the inning.

The Tigers rallied in the bottom of the tenth, starting with singles by McAuliffe and Kaline. Athletics reliever Joe Horlen's wild pitch advanced the runners to second and third and Gates Brown walked to load the bases with no outs. Bill Freehan then grounded an apparent double play ball to third, but the inexperienced Tenace at second dropped Sal Bando's throw. McAuliffe scored and everybody was safe. Dave Hamilton then relieved Horlen and promptly walked Norm Cash to tie the game, and then gave up a walk-off single to Jim Northrup, a ball hit over right fielder Matty Alou's head (the outfield was drawn in), scoring Brown with the winning run.

=== Game 5 ===
October 12, 1972 1:30 pm (ET) at Tiger Stadium in Detroit, Michigan
Team	1	2	3	4	5	6	7	8	9	R	H	E
Oakland	0	1	0	1	0	0	0	0	0	2	4	0
Detroit	1	0	0	0	0	0	0	0	0	1	5	2
WP: Blue Moon Odom (2–0) LP: Woodie Fryman (0–2) Sv: Vida Blue (1)

The Tigers struck in the first off Blue Moon Odom when Dick McAuliffe led off with a single. After a one-out walk to Duke Sims, a passed ball by Gene Tenace put the runners on second and third. McAuliffe scored when Bill Freehan grounded out.

In the second, center fielder and cleanup hitter Reggie Jackson led off for the Athletics with a walk and stole second. Sal Bando's fly to right sent Jackson to third. After Mike Epstein was hit by a Woodie Fryman pitch, Dick Williams ordered a double steal. Jackson collided with Freehan and scored, but Jackson tore his left hamstring and was sidelined for the remainder of the postseason.

The Athletics got the winning tally in the fourth when George Hendrick, Jackson's replacement, reached on a ground ball to shortstop McAuliffe that was ruled a throwing error when Norm Cash's foot was pulled off first base. Cash and Billy Martin argued that the foot never left the base, but to no avail. Bando sacrificed Hendrick to second, and Gene Tenace, making amends for his earlier passed ball, singled Hendrick home for his only hit and RBI of the series.

Odom got the win and Vida Blue the save in four innings of relief as the Athletics, minus Jackson, won their first pennant since 1931 and moved on to the World Series.

The Athletics won despite a team batting average of .224; superb pitching by Oakland held the Tigers to a meager .198 team batting average in the pitchers-dominated series.

== Composite line score ==
1972 ALCS (3–2): Oakland Athletics over Detroit Tigers

Team	1	2	3	4	5	6	7	8	9	10	11	R	H	E
Oakland Athletics	1	1	1	1	4	0	1	0	0	2	2	13	38	3
Detroit Tigers	1	1	1	2	0	0	0	1	0	3	1	10	32	7
Total attendance: 189,681 Average attendance: 37,936

== Aftermath ==
As an odd precursor to what became an explosive relationship years later, Billy Martin visited the Athletics locker room and consoled Reggie Jackson, expressing regret that he would miss the World Series. Even without Jackson, the Athletics went on to beat the Cincinnati Reds in the World Series in seven games, which was the start of a World Series three-peat. Martin later managed Jackson on the Yankees in 1977–1978 and 1979 (Martin stepped down during the 1978 season, but was re-hired in the middle of the 1979 season). Famously, Martin and Jackson had a verbal argument that almost led to a brawl in June 1977 at Fenway Park over Jackson's lack of hustle on a fly ball, requiring coaches and players to intervene. Another major incident was in July 1978, when Jackson disobeyed Martin's bunt order in a key situation, leading to a suspension. Despite these tussles, Martin and Jackson would win a World Series together in 1977.

This would be the Tigers’ last postseason appearance for 12 years, when Detroit would win 104 games and advance to the postseason, where they would eventually win the 1984 World Series.

The Tigers and Athletics have since met three times in the postseason, with Detroit winning all three: a four-game sweep in the 2006 ALCS, and winning a pair of decisive 5-game Division Series in 2012 and 2013.
