= 1972 Oakland Athletics season =

Major League Baseball season

1972 Oakland Athletics
- World Series champion American League champion American League West Division champion
- League: American League
- Division: West
- Ballpark: Oakland-Alameda County Coliseum
- City: Oakland, California
- Record: 93–62 (60%)
- Owner: Charles O. Finley
- Manager: Dick Williams
- Television: KBHK-TV
- Radio: KEEN (Monte Moore, Jim Woods)

The 1972 Oakland Athletics season was the 72nd season for the Oakland Athletics franchise on Major League Baseball (MLB), all as member of the American League, and their 5th season in City of Oakland. The Athletics won the American League West Division with a record of 93 wins and 62 losses. In the playoffs, they defeated the Detroit Tigers in a five-game ALCS, followed by a seven-game World Series, in which they defeated the Cincinnati Reds for their sixth overall World Championship and first since 1930, when the club was in Philadelphia.

== Offseason ==
- November 29, 1971: Rick Monday was traded by the Athletics to the Chicago Cubs for Ken Holtzman.
- November 29, 1971: 1971 rule 5 draft
  - Brant Alyea was drafted by the Athletics from the Minnesota Twins.
  - Steve Hovley was drafted from the Athletics by the Kansas City Royals.
- January 12, 1972: 1972 Major League Baseball draft (January Draft) notable picks:

Round 9: Rich Dauer (did not sign)
Round 10: Bob Lacey

- March 4, 1972: Jim Panther and Don Stanhouse were traded by the Athletics to the Texas Rangers for Denny McLain.

== Regular season ==
In 1972, the A's began wearing solid green or solid gold jerseys, with contrasting white pants, at a time when most other teams wore all-white uniforms at home and all-grey ones on the road. Similar to more colorful amateur softball uniforms, they were considered a radical departure for their time.

Furthermore, in conjunction with a Moustache Day promotion, Finley offered $300 to any player who grew a moustache by Father's Day, at a time when every other team traditionally forbade facial hair. When Father's Day arrived on Sunday, June 18, every player on the 25-man roster collected a bonus.

=== Changing the nickname ===
The nickname "A's" has long been used interchangeably with "Athletics", dating to the team's early days when headline writers wanted a way to shorten the name. Starting in 1972, the team nickname was officially "Oakland A's." The Commissioner's Trophy, given out annually to the winner of baseball's World Series, still listed the team's name as the "Oakland Athletics" on the gold-plated pennant representing the Oakland franchise. According to Bill Libby's Book, Charlie O and the Angry A's, owner Charlie O. Finley banned the word "Athletics" from the club's name because he felt that name was too closely associated with former Philadelphia Athletics owner Connie Mack, and he wanted the name "Oakland A's" to become just as closely associated with himself. The name also vaguely suggested the name of the old minor league Oakland Oaks, which were alternatively called the "Acorns".

=== Season standings ===
AL West
Team	W	L	Pct.	GB	Home	Road
Oakland Athletics	93	62	.600	—	48‍–‍29	45‍–‍33
Chicago White Sox	87	67	.565	5½	55‍–‍23	32‍–‍44
Minnesota Twins	77	77	.500	15½	42‍–‍32	35‍–‍45
Kansas City Royals	76	78	.494	16½	44‍–‍33	32‍–‍45
California Angels	75	80	.484	18	44‍–‍36	31‍–‍44
Texas Rangers	54	100	.351	38½	31‍–‍46	23‍–‍54

=== Record vs. opponents ===
1972 American League records Sources:
Team	BAL	BOS	CAL	CWS	CLE	DET	KC	MIL	MIN	NYY	OAK	TEX
Baltimore	—	7–11	6–6	8–4	8–10	10–8	6–6	10–5	6–6	7–6	6–6	6–6
Boston	11–7	—	8–4	6–6	8–7	5–9	6–6	11–7	4–8	9–9	9–3	8–4
California	6–6	4–8	—	7–11	8–4	5–7	9–6	7–5	7–8	4–8	8–10	10–7
Chicago	4–8	6–6	11–7	—	8–4	5–7	8–9	9–3	8–6	7–5	7–8	14–4
Cleveland	10–8	7–8	4–8	4–8	—	10–8	6–6	5–10	8–4	7–11	2–10	9–3
Detroit	8–10	9–5	7–5	7–5	8–10	—	7–5	10–8	9–3	7–9	4–8	10–2
Kansas City	6–6	6–6	6–9	9–8	6–6	5–7	—	7–5	9–9	7–5	7–11	8–6
Milwaukee	5–10	7–11	5–7	3–9	10–5	8–10	5–7	—	4–8	9–9	4–8	5–7
Minnesota	6–6	8–4	8–7	6–8	4–8	3–9	9–9	8–4	—	6–6	8–9	11–7
New York	6–7	9–9	8–4	5–7	11–7	9–7	5–7	9–9	6–6	—	3–9	8–4
Oakland	6–6	3–9	10–8	8–7	10–2	8–4	11–7	8–4	9–8	9–3	—	11–4
Texas	6–6	4–8	7–10	4–14	3–9	2–10	6–8	7–5	7–11	4–8	4–11	—

=== Opening Day Lineup ===
Opening Day Starters
#	Name	Position
19	Bert Campaneris	SS
26	Joe Rudi	LF
9	Reggie Jackson	RF
6	Sal Bando	3B
5	Mike Epstein	1B
15	Bobby Brooks	CF
10	Dave Duncan	C
22	Dick Green	2B
30	Ken Holtzman	P

=== Notable transactions ===
- April 15, 1972: Tim Cullen was signed as a free agent by the Athletics.
- May 15, 1972: Dwain Anderson was traded by the Athletics to the St. Louis Cardinals for Don Shaw.
- May 17, 1972: Curt Blefary, Mike Kilkenny, and a player to be named later were traded by the Athletics to the San Diego Padres for Ollie Brown. The Athletics completed the trade by sending Greg Schubert (minors) to the Padres on September 11.
- May 18, 1972: Brant Alyea was traded by the Athletics to the St. Louis Cardinals for Marty Martínez.
- June 6, 1972: 1972 Major League Baseball draft (June Draft) notable picks:

Round 1: Chet Lemon
Round 9: Dennis Littlejohn (did not sign)
Round 12: Chris Batton
Round 15: Bob Pate (did not play)

- June 7, 1972: Diego Seguí was sent by the Athletics to the St. Louis Cardinals as part of a conditional deal.
- June 29, 1972: Denny McLain was traded by the Athletics to the Atlanta Braves for Orlando Cepeda.
- July 20, 1972: Marty Martínez, Vic Harris and a player to be named later were traded by the Athletics to the Texas Rangers for Don Mincher and Ted Kubiak. The Athletics completed the deal by sending Steve Lawson to the Rangers on July 26.
- July 23, 1972: Brant Alyea was returned to the Athletics by the St. Louis Cardinals.
- August 30, 1972: Joe Lindsey (minors) and a player to be named later were traded by the Athletics to the St. Louis Cardinals for Dal Maxvill. The Athletics completed the trade by sending Gene Dusen (minors) to the Cardinals on October 27.

=== Roster ===
1972 Oakland Athletics
Roster
Pitchers: 35 Vida Blue; 34 Rollie Fingers; 33 Dave Hamilton; 30 Ken Holtzman; 22 Joe Horlen; 27 Catfish Hunter; 33 Mike Kilkenny; 32 Darold Knowles; 36 Bob Locker; 17 Denny McLain; 13 Blue Moon Odom; 33 Jim Roland; 24 Diego Seguí; 14 Don Shaw; 17 Gary Waslewski	Catchers: 10 Dave Duncan; 12 Larry Haney; 38 Gene Tenace; Infielders: 11 Dwain Anderson; 6 Sal Bando; 3 Curt Blefary; 8 Larry Brown; 19 Bert Campaneris; 4 Ron Clark; 16 Tim Cullen; 5 Mike Epstein; 1 Dick Green; 20 Mike Hegan; 11 Ted Kubiak; 12 Gonzalo Márquez; 11 Marty Martínez; 21 Dal Maxvill; 18 Bill McNulty; 4 Don Mincher	Outfielders: 14 Matty Alou; 7 Brant Alyea; 15 Bobby Brooks; 15 Ollie Brown; 3 Adrian Garrett; 25 George Hendrick; 9 Reggie Jackson; 24 Allan Lewis; 2 Ángel Mangual; 26 Joe Rudi; 24 Bill Voss; Other batters: 12 Orlando Cepeda; 7 Art Shamsky	Manager: 23 Dick Williams; Coaches: 41 Jerry Adair; 44 Vern Hoscheit; 43 Irv Noren; 40 Bill Posedel

== Player stats ==
= Indicates team leader

=== Batting ===
= Indicates league leader

==== Starters by position ====
Note: Pos = Position; G = Games played; AB = At bats; H = Hits; Avg. = Batting average; HR = Home runs; RBI = Runs batted in

Pos	Player	G	AB	H	Avg.	HR	RBI
C	Dave Duncan	121	403	88	.218	19	59
1B	Mike Epstein	138	455	123	.270	26	70
2B	Tim Cullen	72	142	37	.261	0	15
3B	Sal Bando	152	535	126	.236	15	77
SS	Bert Campaneris	149	625	150	.240	8	32
LF	Joe Rudi	147	593	181	.305	19	75
CF	Reggie Jackson	135	499	132	.265	25	75
RF	Ángel Mangual	91	272	67	.246	5	32

==== Other batters ====
Note: G = Games played; AB = At bats; H = Hits; Avg. = Batting average; HR = Home runs; RBI = Runs batted in

Player	G	AB	H	Avg.	HR	RBI
Gene Tenace	82	227	51	.225	5	32
Larry Brown	47	142	26	.183	0	4
Matty Alou	32	121	34	.281	1	16
George Hendrick	58	121	22	.182	4	15
Bill Voss	40	97	22	.227	1	5
Ted Kubiak	51	94	17	.181	0	8
Mike Hegan	98	79	26	.329	1	5
Don Mincher	47	54	8	.148	0	5
Ollie Brown	20	54	13	.241	1	4
Dick Green	26	42	12	.286	0	3
Marty Martínez	22	40	5	.125	0	1
Bobby Brooks	15	39	7	.179	0	5
Dal Maxvill	27	36	9	.250	0	1
Brant Alyea	20	31	6	.194	1	2
Gonzalo Márquez	23	21	8	.381	0	4
Ron Clark	14	15	4	.267	0	1
Curt Blefary	8	11	5	.455	0	1
Adrian Garrett	14	11	0	.000	0	0
Allan Lewis	24	10	2	.200	0	2
Bill McNulty	4	10	1	.100	0	0
Art Shamsky	8	7	0	.000	0	0
Dwain Anderson	3	7	0	.000	0	0
Larry Haney	5	4	0	.000	0	0
Orlando Cepeda	3	3	0	.000	0	0

=== Pitching ===
==== Starting pitchers ====
Note: G = Games pitched; IP = Innings pitched; W = Wins; L = Losses; ERA = Earned run average; SO = Strikeouts

Player	G	IP	W	L	ERA	SO
Catfish Hunter	38	295.1	21	7	2.04	191
Ken Holtzman	39	265.1	19	11	2.51	134
Blue Moon Odom	31	194.1	15	6	2.50	86
Vida Blue	25	151.0	6	10	2.80	111
Denny McLain	5	22.1	1	2	6.04	8

==== Other pitchers ====
Note: G = Games pitched; IP = Innings pitched; W = Wins; L = Losses; ERA = Earned run average; SO = Strikeouts

Player	G	IP	W	L	ERA	SO
Dave Hamilton	25	101.1	6	6	2.93	55
Joe Horlen	32	84.0	3	4	3.00	58
Diego Seguí	7	22.2	0	1	3.57	11

==== Relief pitchers ====
Note: G = Games pitched; W = Wins; L = Losses; SV = Saves; ERA = Earned run average; SO = Strikeouts

Player	G	W	L	SV	ERA	SO
Rollie Fingers	65	11	9	21	2.51	113
Bob Locker	56	6	1	10	2.65	47
Darold Knowles	54	5	1	11	1.37	36
Gary Waslewski	8	0	3	0	2.04	8
Don Shaw	3	0	1	0	16.88	4
Jim Roland	2	0	0	0	3.86	0
Mike Kilkenny	1	0	0	0	0.00	0

== Postseason ==
=== ALCS ===
==== Game 1 ====
October 7, 1972, at Oakland-Alameda County Coliseum

Team	1	2	3	4	5	6	7	8	9	10	11	R	H	E
Detroit	0	1	0	0	0	0	0	0	0	0	1	2	6	2
Oakland	0	0	1	0	0	0	0	0	0	0	2	3	10	1
W: Rollie Fingers (1–0) L: Mickey Lolich (0–1)
HR: DET – Norm Cash (1), Al Kaline (1)

==== Game 2 ====
October 8, 1972, at Oakland-Alameda County Coliseum

Team	1	2	3	4	5	6	7	8	9	R	H	E
Detroit	0	0	0	0	0	0	0	0	0	0	3	1
Oakland	1	0	0	0	4	0	0	0	X	5	8	0
W: Blue Moon Odom (1–0) L: Woodie Fryman (0–1)
HR: None

==== Game 3 ====
October 10, 1972, at Tiger Stadium

Team	1	2	3	4	5	6	7	8	9	R	H	E
Oakland	0	0	0	0	0	0	0	0	0	0	7	0
Detroit	0	0	0	2	0	0	0	1	X	3	8	1
W: Joe Coleman (1–0) L: Ken Holtzman (0–1)
HR: DET – Bill Freehan (1)

==== Game 4 ====
October 11, 1972, at Tiger Stadium

Team	1	2	3	4	5	6	7	8	9	10	R	H	E
Oakland	0	0	0	0	0	0	1	0	0	2	3	9	2
Detroit	0	0	1	0	0	0	0	0	0	3	4	10	1
W: John Hiller (1–0) L: Bob Locker (0–1)
HR: OAK – Mike Epstein (1) DET – Dick McAuliffe (1)

==== Game 5 ====
October 12, 1972, at Tiger Stadium

Team	1	2	3	4	5	6	7	8	9	R	H	E
Oakland	0	1	0	1	0	0	0	0	0	2	4	0
Detroit	1	0	0	0	0	0	0	0	0	1	5	2
W: Blue Moon Odom (2–0) L: Woodie Fryman (0–2) S: Vida Blue (1)
HR: None

=== World Series ===
In 1972, the A's won their first league pennant since 1931 and faced the Cincinnati Reds in the World Series. The A's seven-game victory over the heavily favored Reds gave the team its first World Series championship since 1930.

Of the four wins against the Reds, three of them occurred in Cincinnati, and all four Series victories were by a single run. Gene Tenace hit four home runs and drove in nine runs to power the A's offense, and was named the series Most Valuable Player.

==== Composite Box ====
1972 World Series (4–3): Oakland Athletics (A.L.) over Cincinnati Reds (N.L.)

Team	1	2	3	4	5	6	7	8	9	R	H	E
Oakland Athletics	1	6	1	1	3	2	0	0	2	16	46	9
Cincinnati Reds	1	1	0	3	3	1	6	4	2	21	46	5
Total Attendance: 363,149 Average Attendance: 51,878
Winning Player's Share: – $20,705, Losing Player's Share– $15,080 *Includes Playoffs and World Series

== Awards and honors ==
- Gene Tenace, Babe Ruth Award
- Gene Tenace, World Series Most Valuable Player

=== League leaders ===
- Joe Rudi, American League leader, triples (tied) (9)

== Farm system ==
Level	Team	League	Manager
AAA	Iowa Oaks	American Association	Sherm Lollar
AA	Birmingham A's	Southern League	Phil Cavarretta
A	Burlington Bees	Midwest League	Harry Bright
A-Short Season	Coos Bay-North Bend A's	Northwest League	Grover Resinger
