= Dave Hamilton (baseball) =

American baseball player (born 1947)

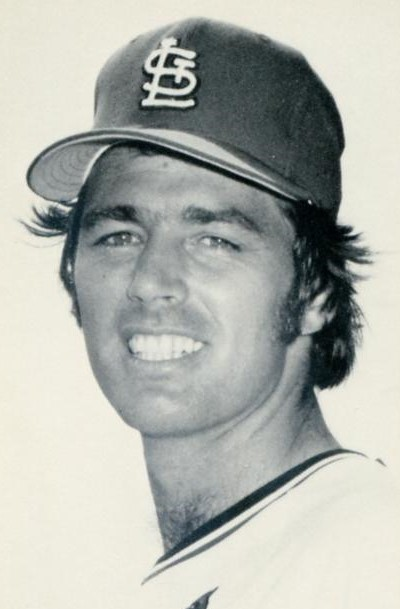
- Pitcher
- Born: December 13, 1947 (age 78); Seattle, Washington, U.S.
- Batted: Left Threw: Left

MLB debut
- May 29, 1972, for the Oakland A's

Last MLB appearance
- September 19, 1980, for the Oakland A's

MLB statistics
- Win–loss record: 39–41
- Earned run average: 3.85
- Strikeouts: 434
- Stats at Baseball Reference

Teams
- Oakland Athletics (1972–1975); Chicago White Sox (1975–1977); St. Louis Cardinals (1978); Pittsburgh Pirates (1978); Oakland Athletics (1979–1980)

Career highlights and awards
- 3× World Series champion (1972–1974)

David Edward Hamilton (born December 13, 1947) is an American former professional baseball pitcher. He played in Major League Baseball (MLB) from 1972 to 1980, and won three World Series championships as a member of the Oakland Athletics.

== Oakland A's ==
Hamilton was drafted out of Edmonds High School in Edmonds, Washington by the Kansas City Athletics in the fifth round of the 1966 Major League Baseball draft. He spent six seasons in their farm system before receiving a call up to the Oakland Athletics in May of 1972. He won his major league debut on May 29, starting the second game of a doubleheader with the Texas Rangers.

He ended the season at 6–6 with a 2.93 earned run average as the A's headed to the 1972 American League Championship Series against the Detroit Tigers. Hamilton made only one appearance in the ALCS, blowing a save opportunity in game four. He appeared twice in the World Series against the Cincinnati Reds. He faced just one batter, Joe Morgan in game five, and got a double play on a fly ball to Matty Alou in right field in which Pete Rose tried to score from third. In game six, the "Big Red Machine" tagged Hamilton for four runs in just two-thirds of an inning.

The A's returned to the World Series again in 1973 and 1974, but Hamilton never made a post-season appearance either year. He was traded along with Chet Lemon from the Athletics to the Chicago White Sox for Stan Bahnsen and Skip Pitlock at the non-waiver trade deadline on June 15, 1975.

== Chicago White Sox ==
Though Hamilton had been used as both a starter and reliever in Oakland, he was used strictly out of the bullpen by White Sox manager, Chuck Tanner. He earned his first major league save on June 25, and went on to earn 25 in three seasons with the club. On November 28, 1977, he and Silvio Martinez were sent to the St. Louis Cardinals to complete an August 31 deal in which the Chisox sent two players to be named later to the Cards for Clay Carroll.

== St. Louis Cardinals ==
Hamilton got off to a poor start with the Cardinals, and soon found himself doing mop-up duty for manager Vern Rapp. When Ken Boyer replaced Rapp at the helm, Hamilton was given the opportunity to redeem himself, but after blowing a save against the San Diego Padres on back-to-back home runs by Gene Tenace and Rick Sweet, found himself again in the mop-up role. He appeared in thirteen games for the Cardinals, all of which were losses, and was 0–0 with a 6.43 ERA when his contract was sold to the Pittsburgh Pirates.

== Pittsburgh Pirates ==
After losing his first game as a Pirate, Hamilton earned his first save of the season against the New York Mets shortly afterwards. He began seeing more time in pressure situations, but after failing to perform, found himself again in the now familiar mop-up role. Following the season, he returned to Oakland as a free agent.

== Return to Oakland ==
Hamilton went 3–4 with five saves and a 3.70 ERA for Oakland in 1979. He split 1980 between Oakland and the Ogden A's, going 0–3 with an 11.40 ERA at the major league level. After four games with the Pacific Coast League's Tacoma Tigers in 1981, he retired.

== Career stats ==
Seasons	W	L	PCT	ERA	G	GS	CG	SV	IP	H	ER	R	HR	BB	K	WP	HBP	Fld%
9	39	41	.488	3.85	301	57	4	31	704	692	301	339	61	317	434	11	15	.962

Hamilton was 4-for-26 in 1972 with five walks and two runs scored. In seven more at-bats (in 1978), he never reached base again.

== Personal life ==
He currently lives in California with his wife, Lynn, and has three grown children Jonathan, Brian and Christy as well as his grandchildren, Austin, Matthew, Briley, Cole, Joshua, Ellie, and Jake. He began coaching baseball for California High School in San Ramon in 1996. He is also a project manager for a roofing contractor.
