= 1972 Major League Baseball season =

1972 MLB season
- League: American League (AL); National League (NL)
- Sport: Baseball
- Duration: Regular season: April 15 – October 4, 1972; Postseason: October 7–22, 1972
- Games: 162 (scheduled); 154–156 (actual, AL); 153–156 (actual, NL)
- Teams: 24 (12 per league)
- TV partner: NBC

Draft
- Top draft pick: Dave Roberts
- Picked by: San Diego Padres

Regular season
- Season MVP: AL: Dick Allen (CWS); NL: Johnny Bench (CIN)

Postseason
- AL champions: Oakland Athletics
- AL runners-up: Detroit Tigers
- NL champions: Cincinnati Reds
- NL runners-up: Pittsburgh Pirates

World Series
- Champions: Oakland Athletics
- Runners-up: Cincinnati Reds
- World Series MVP: Gene Tenace (OAK)

MLB seasons
- ← 1971 1973 →

Locations of teams for the 1972 American League season
West East
Locations of teams for the 1971–1976 National League seasons
West East

The 1972 major league baseball season was originally scheduled to begin on April 5. The 1972 strike caused the season to see its first 10 days of games canceled, resulting in the season starting on April 15, while the regular season ended as originally scheduled on October 4. The postseason began on October 7. The 69th World Series began with Game 1 with the Oakland Athletics of the American League defeating the Cincinnati Reds of the National League, four games to three, capturing their sixth championship in franchise history (and first in Oakland), since their previous in Philadelphia in 1930. This was the first of three straight victories behind the bats of Reggie Jackson and Bert Campaneris, and the pitching cadre of Catfish Hunter, Rollie Fingers, and Vida Blue. Jackie Robinson, the player instrumental in breaking the AL and NL's color barrier, threw out the first pitch prior to Game 2 in what would be his last public appearance. He died two days after the series ended at age 53 due to complications from diabetes and heart failure. Going into the season, the defending World Series champions were the Pittsburgh Pirates from the 1971 season. The season was the first to have games canceled by a player strike. It was also the last season in which American League pitchers would hit for themselves on a regular basis; the designated hitter rule would go into effect the following season.

The 43rd All-Star Game was held on July 25 at Atlanta Stadium in Atlanta, Georgia, home of the Atlanta Braves. The National League won in ten innings, 4–3, and was the first win in what would be an 11-game win streak that lasted until 1983.

1972 marked the first year for the Texas Rangers, who had moved to Arlington, Texas from Washington, D.C. (where they played as the Washington Senators) after the 1971 season. The team was one of the worst ever fielded by the franchise, losing 100 games for the first time since 1964. Manager Ted Williams hated it in the Dallas–Fort Worth area, and resigned at the end of the season. Washington, D.C. was left without a major-league team for the first time since 1890. The city would not see a home team for 33 seasons, until the Montreal Expos relocated and became the Washington Nationals in 2005.

The Rangers' relocation necessitated the American League to transfer the team to the American League West division from the American League East division due to its distance from AL East teams. Because of this, one of the teams already in the AL West needed to switch to the AL East. The Chicago White Sox and Milwaukee Brewers were seen as the likeliest candidates to transfer divisions, although the Minnesota Twins lobbied to keep the Rangers in the East because it wanted both the Brewers and White Sox as division rivals. Even though the White Sox were slightly further east, it was decided that the Brewers, as the newer franchise, would make the move, even though the White Sox wanted to go to the East since five of the league's original franchises were in that division, and that the Cubs were in the National League East. The Brewers would become division rivals of the Twins and White Sox in 1994 with the formation of the American League Central, but this would last only through 1997, when Milwaukee transferred to the National League and became a division rival of the Cubs (the Brewers and Twins continue to face each other every year through interleague play).

1972 would also mark the Kansas City Royals' final year at Kansas City Municipal Stadium, as the next year they would move to Royals Stadium at the Truman Sports Complex in eastern Kansas City. The Royals had hoped to move out of Municipal after the 1971 season, but a series of labor strikes forced the team to spend one more year at the old facility, which hosted the Athletics from 1955–1967 (and the National Football League's Chiefs from 1963–1971).

The year ended on a sad note when Roberto Clemente died in an airplane crash off the coast of San Juan, Puerto Rico, on New Year's Eve, while participating in aid efforts after the 1972 Nicaragua earthquake.

== Labor strike ==
1972 was affected by a players' strike over pension and salary arbitration. The strike, which started on April 1, erased the first ten days of the season, canceling 86 games, and ended on April 13. Both leagues decided to excise the lost portion of the season with no makeups, and start the season on April 15. As a result, an uneven number of games were lost by each team; some as few as six, some as many as nine. The lack of makeups, even when they affected the playoffs, led to the Boston Red Sox losing the American League East by half a game to the Detroit Tigers, who played one more game (156 to 155).

== Schedule ==
The 1972 schedule, originally scheduled with a 162 game schedule per team, consisted of 153–156 games for all teams in the American League and National League, each of which had 12 teams. Each league was split into two six-team divisions. Each team was (pre-strike) scheduled to play 18 games against their five division rivals, totaling 90 games, and 12 games against six interdivision opponents, totaling 72 games. Due to the strike, the total number of games were inconsistently cut down, as the first ten days scheduled were simply canceled. The structure of the 162-game format was put in place in 1969 and would be used until 1977 in the American League and 1993 in the National League.

Opening Day, which pre-strike was scheduled for April 5, took place on April 15, featuring 22 teams. The final day of the regular season was on October 4, also featuring 22 teams. The League Championship Series for both leagues began on October 7. The National League Championship Series concluded on October 11, while the American League Championship Series concluded October 12. The World Series took place between October 14 and October 22.

== Rule changes ==
The 1972 season saw the following rule changes:

- The rule governing "players to be named later" was modified to prohibit such a player from appearing in the same league as the team to which he was traded, between the date of the trade and the date of its completion. This provision was added to keep a player from directly competing with a club to whom he had been traded. The rule was also modified to require that a cash amount be specified so that the teams could later agree to use the cash consideration instead of the player.
- During the 1971 season several players — notably St. Louis outfielders Lou Brock and José Cardenal and San Diego outfielder Ivan Murrell — began using a so-called "Japanese teacup bat," which had a hollow end. NL President Chub Feeney approved its use pending the eventual opinion of the Rules Committee, which met at the meetings and approved. Committee chairman John H. Johnson, an administrative aide to the commissioner, claimed that the bat did not provide the hitter an advantage.
- The committee ruled that all Double-A players would be required to wear an earflap helmet beginning in 1972, and all Triple-A players by 1973. The rule would not be implemented at the major league level until 1983, and only applied to new players.

== Teams ==
League	Division	Team	City	Ballpark	Capacity	Manager
American League	East	Baltimore Orioles	Baltimore, Maryland	Baltimore Memorial Stadium	53,208	Earl Weaver
American League	East	Boston Red Sox	Boston, Massachusetts	Fenway Park	33,368	Eddie Kasko
American League	East	Cleveland Indians	Cleveland, Ohio	Cleveland Stadium	74,483	Ken Aspromonte
American League	East	Detroit Tigers	Detroit, Michigan	Tiger Stadium	52,806	Billy Martin
American League	East	Milwaukee Brewers	Milwaukee, Wisconsin	Milwaukee County Stadium	53,192	Dave Bristol
American League	East	Milwaukee Brewers	Milwaukee, Wisconsin	Milwaukee County Stadium	53,192	Roy McMillan
American League	East	Milwaukee Brewers	Milwaukee, Wisconsin	Milwaukee County Stadium	53,192	Del Crandall
American League	East	New York Yankees	New York, New York	Yankee Stadium	65,010	Ralph Houk
American League	West	California Angels	Anaheim, California	Anaheim Stadium	43,500	Del Rice
American League	West	Chicago White Sox	Chicago, Illinois	White Sox Park	44,492	Chuck Tanner
American League	West	Kansas City Royals	Kansas City, Missouri	Municipal Stadium	35,561	Bob Lemon
American League	West	Minnesota Twins	Bloomington, Minnesota	Metropolitan Stadium	45,919	Bill Rigney
American League	West	Minnesota Twins	Bloomington, Minnesota	Metropolitan Stadium	45,919	Frank Quilici
American League	West	Oakland Athletics	Oakland, California	Oakland–Alameda County Coliseum	50,000	Dick Williams
American League	West	Texas Rangers	Arlington, Texas	Arlington Stadium	35,185	Ted Williams
National League	East	Chicago Cubs	Chicago, Illinois	Wrigley Field	37,702	Leo Durocher
National League	East	Chicago Cubs	Chicago, Illinois	Wrigley Field	37,702	Whitey Lockman
National League	East	Montreal Expos	Montreal, Quebec	Jarry Park Stadium	29,125	Gene Mauch
National League	East	New York Mets	New York, New York	Shea Stadium	55,300	Yogi Berra
National League	East	Philadelphia Phillies	Philadelphia, Pennsylvania	Veterans Stadium	62,382	Frank Lucchesi
National League	East	Philadelphia Phillies	Philadelphia, Pennsylvania	Veterans Stadium	62,382	Paul Owens
National League	East	Pittsburgh Pirates	Pittsburgh, Pennsylvania	Three Rivers Stadium	58,722	Bill Virdon
National League	East	St. Louis Cardinals	St. Louis, Missouri	Civic Center Busch Memorial Stadium	53,138	Red Schoendienst
National League	West	Atlanta Braves	Atlanta, Georgia	Atlanta Stadium	51,383	Lum Harris
National League	West	Atlanta Braves	Atlanta, Georgia	Atlanta Stadium	51,383	Eddie Mathews
National League	West	Cincinnati Reds	Cincinnati, Ohio	Riverfront Stadium	52,953	Sparky Anderson
National League	West	Houston Astros	Houston, Texas	Houston Astrodome	47,000	Harry Walker
National League	West	Houston Astros	Houston, Texas	Houston Astrodome	47,000	Salty Parker
National League	West	Houston Astros	Houston, Texas	Houston Astrodome	47,000	Leo Durocher
National League	West	Los Angeles Dodgers	Los Angeles, California	Dodger Stadium	56,000	Walter Alston
National League	West	San Diego Padres	San Diego, California	San Diego Stadium	50,000	Preston Gómez
National League	West	San Diego Padres	San Diego, California	San Diego Stadium	50,000	Don Zimmer
National League	West	San Francisco Giants	San Francisco, California	Candlestick Park	58,945	Charlie Fox

== Standings ==
=== American League ===
AL East
Team	W	L	Pct.	GB	Home	Road
Detroit Tigers	86	70	.551	—	44‍–‍34	42‍–‍36
Boston Red Sox	85	70	.548	½	52‍–‍26	33‍–‍44
Baltimore Orioles	80	74	.519	5	38‍–‍39	42‍–‍35
New York Yankees	79	76	.510	6½	46‍–‍31	33‍–‍45
Cleveland Indians	72	84	.462	14	43‍–‍34	29‍–‍50
Milwaukee Brewers	65	91	.417	21	37‍–‍42	28‍–‍49

AL West
Team	W	L	Pct.	GB	Home	Road
Oakland Athletics	93	62	.600	—	48‍–‍29	45‍–‍33
Chicago White Sox	87	67	.565	5½	55‍–‍23	32‍–‍44
Minnesota Twins	77	77	.500	15½	42‍–‍32	35‍–‍45
Kansas City Royals	76	78	.494	16½	44‍–‍33	32‍–‍45
California Angels	75	80	.484	18	44‍–‍36	31‍–‍44
Texas Rangers	54	100	.351	38½	31‍–‍46	23‍–‍54

=== National League ===
NL East
Team	W	L	Pct.	GB	Home	Road
Pittsburgh Pirates	96	59	.619	—	49‍–‍29	47‍–‍30
Chicago Cubs	85	70	.548	11	46‍–‍31	39‍–‍39
New York Mets	83	73	.532	13½	41‍–‍37	42‍–‍36
St. Louis Cardinals	75	81	.481	21½	40‍–‍37	35‍–‍44
Montreal Expos	70	86	.449	26½	35‍–‍43	35‍–‍43
Philadelphia Phillies	59	97	.378	37½	28‍–‍51	31‍–‍46

NL West
Team	W	L	Pct.	GB	Home	Road
Cincinnati Reds	95	59	.617	—	42‍–‍34	53‍–‍25
Houston Astros	84	69	.549	10½	41‍–‍36	43‍–‍33
Los Angeles Dodgers	85	70	.548	10½	41‍–‍34	44‍–‍36
Atlanta Braves	70	84	.455	25	36‍–‍41	34‍–‍43
San Francisco Giants	69	86	.445	26½	34‍–‍43	35‍–‍43
San Diego Padres	58	95	.379	36½	26‍–‍54	32‍–‍41

=== Tie game ===
1 tie game (0 in AL, 1 in NL), which is not factored into winning percentage or games behind (and was replayed again) occurred during the season.

==== National League ====
- July 4 (game 2), Atlanta Braves vs. Chicago Cubs, tied at 3 following two singles in the top of the eighth inning due to rain.

== Postseason ==
The postseason began on October 7 and ended on October 22 with the Oakland Athletics defeating the Cincinnati Reds in the 1972 World Series in seven games.

=== Bracket ===
League Championship Series (ALCS, NLCS)
East	Detroit	2
West	Oakland	3
East	Pittsburgh	2
West	Cincinnati	3

World Series
AL	Oakland	4
NL	Cincinnati	3

== Managerial changes ==
=== Off-season ===
Team	Former Manager	New Manager
California Angels	Lefty Phillips	Del Rice
Cleveland Indians	Johnny Lipon	Ken Aspromonte
New York Mets	Gil Hodges	Yogi Berra
Pittsburgh Pirates	Danny Murtaugh	Bill Virdon

=== In-season ===
Team	Former Manager	New Manager
Atlanta Braves	Lum Harris	Eddie Mathews
Chicago Cubs	Leo Durocher	Whitey Lockman
Houston Astros	Harry Walker	Salty Parker
Houston Astros	Salty Parker	Leo Durocher
Milwaukee Brewers	Dave Bristol	Roy McMillan
Milwaukee Brewers	Roy McMillan	Del Crandall
Minnesota Twins	Bill Rigney	Frank Quilici
Philadelphia Phillies	Frank Lucchesi	Paul Owens
San Diego Padres	Preston Gómez	Don Zimmer

== League leaders ==
=== American League ===
Hitting leaders
Stat	Player	Total
AVG	Rod Carew (MIN)	.318
OPS	Dick Allen (CWS)	1.023
HR	Dick Allen (CWS)	37
RBI	Dick Allen (CWS)	113
R	Bobby Murcer (NYY)	102
H	Joe Rudi (OAK)	181
SB	Bert Campaneris (OAK)	52

Pitching leaders
Stat	Player	Total
W	Gaylord Perry (CLE); Wilbur Wood (CWS)	24
L	Pat Dobson (BAL); Mel Stottlemyre (NYY)	18
ERA	Luis Tiant (BOS)	1.91
K	Nolan Ryan (CAL)	329
IP	Wilbur Wood (CWS)	376.2
SV	Sparky Lyle (NYY)	35
WHIP	Roger Nelson (KC)	0.871

=== National League ===
Hitting leaders
Stat	Player	Total
AVG	Billy Williams (CHC)	.333
OPS	Billy Williams (CHC)	1.005
HR	Johnny Bench (CIN)	40
RBI	Johnny Bench (CIN)	125
R	Joe Morgan (CIN)	122
H	Pete Rose (CIN)	198
SB	Lou Brock (STL)	63

Pitching leaders
Stat	Player	Total
W	Steve Carlton^{1} (PHI)	27
L	Steve Arlin (SD)	21
ERA	Steve Carlton^{1} (PHI)	1.97
K	Steve Carlton^{1} (PHI)	310
IP	Steve Carlton (PHI)	346.1
SV	Clay Carroll (CIN)	37
WHIP	Don Sutton (LAD)	0.913

^{1} National League Triple Crown pitching winner

== Milestones ==
=== Batters ===
==== Cycles ====
- Dave Kingman (SF):
  - Kingman hit for his first cycle and 15th in franchise history, on April 16 against the Houston Astros.
- César Cedeño (HOU):
  - Cedeño hit for his first cycle and first in franchise history, on August 2 against the Cincinnati Reds.
- Bobby Murcer (NYY):
  - Murcer hit for his first cycle and 13th in franchise history, in game one of a doubleheader on August 29 against the Texas Rangers.
- César Tovar (MIN):
  - Tovar hit for his first cycle and sixth in franchise history, on September 19 against the Texas Rangers.

=== Other batting accomplishments ===
- Rich Reese (MIN):
  - Set an American League record and became the second Major League player to hit three career grand slams as a pinch-hitter on July 9 in a 9–6 loss to the New York Yankees.
- Roberto Clemente (PIT):
  - Became the 11th member of the 3,000-hit club with a double in the fourth inning against the New York Mets on September 30.

=== Pitchers ===
==== No-hitters ====
- Burt Hooton (CHC):
  - Hooton threw his first career no-hitter and 11th no-hitter in franchise history, by defeating the Philadelphia Phillies 4–0 on April 16. He walked seven and struck out seven.
- Milt Pappas (CHC):
  - Pappas threw his first career no-hitter and 12th no-hitter in franchise history, by defeating the San Diego Padres 8–0 on September 2. He walked one and struck out six.
- Bill Stoneman (MON):
  - Stoneman threw his second career no-hitter and second no-hitter in franchise history, by defeating the New York Mets 7–0 in game one of a doubleheader on October 2. He walked seven and struck out nine.

== Awards and honors ==
=== Regular season ===
Baseball Writers' Association of America Awards
BBWAA Award	National League	American League
Rookie of the Year	Jon Matlack (NYM)	Carlton Fisk (BOS)
Cy Young Award	Steve Carlton (PHI)	Gaylord Perry (CLE)
Most Valuable Player	Johnny Bench (CIN)	Dick Allen (CWS)
Babe Ruth Award (World Series MVP)	—	Gene Tenace (OAK)
Gold Glove Awards
Position	National League	American League
Pitcher	Bob Gibson (STL)	Jim Kaat (MIN)
Catcher	Johnny Bench (CIN)	Carlton Fisk (BOS)
1st Base	Wes Parker (LAD)	George Scott (MIL)
2nd Base	Félix Millán (ATL)	Doug Griffin (BOS)
3rd Base	Doug Rader (HOU)	Brooks Robinson (BAL)
Shortstop	Larry Bowa (PHI)	Ed Brinkman (DET)
Outfield	César Cedeño (HOU)	Ken Berry (CAL)
Outfield	Roberto Clemente (PIT)	Paul Blair (BAL)
Outfield	Willie Davis (LAD)	Bobby Murcer (NYY)

=== Other awards ===
- Commissioner's Award (Humanitarian): Brooks Robinson (BAL)
- Hutch Award: Bobby Tolan (CIN)
- Sport Magazine's World Series Most Valuable Player Award: Gene Tenace (OAK)

The Sporting News Awards
Award	National League	American League
Player of the Year	Billy Williams (CHC)	—
Pitcher of the Year	Steve Carlton (PHI)	Wilbur Wood (CWS)
Fireman of the Year (Relief pitcher)	Clay Carroll (CIN)	Sparky Lyle (NYY)
Rookie Player of the Year	Dave Rader (SF)	Carlton Fisk (BOS)
Rookie Pitcher of the Year	Jon Matlack (NYM)	Dick Tidrow (CLE)
Comeback Player of the Year	Bobby Tolan (CIN)	Luis Tiant (BOS)
Manager of the Year	—	Chuck Tanner (CWS)
Executive of the Year	—	Roland Hemond (CWS)

=== Monthly awards ===
==== Player of the Month ====
Month	National League
April	Don Sutton (LAD)
May	Bob Watson (HOU)
June	César Cedeño (HOU)
July	Billy Williams (CHC)
August	Ken Henderson (SF)

=== Baseball Hall of Fame ===
- Yogi Berra
- Josh Gibson
- Lefty Gomez
- Sandy Koufax (at 36, the youngest inductee ever)
- Buck Leonard
- Early Wynn
- Ross Youngs
- Will Harridge (executive)

== Home field attendance ==
Team name	Wins	%±	Home attendance	%±	Per game
New York Mets	83	0.0%	2,134,185	−5.8%	27,361
Detroit Tigers	86	−5.5%	1,892,386	18.9%	24,261
Los Angeles Dodgers	85	−4.5%	1,860,858	−9.9%	24,811
Cincinnati Reds	95	20.3%	1,611,459	7.4%	21,203
Houston Astros	84	6.3%	1,469,247	16.5%	19,081
Boston Red Sox	85	0.0%	1,441,718	−14.1%	18,484
Pittsburgh Pirates	96	−1.0%	1,427,460	−4.9%	18,301
Philadelphia Phillies	59	−11.9%	1,343,329	−11.1%	17,004
Chicago Cubs	85	2.4%	1,299,163	−21.4%	16,872
St. Louis Cardinals	75	−16.7%	1,196,894	−25.4%	15,544
Chicago White Sox	87	10.1%	1,177,318	41.2%	15,094
Montreal Expos	70	−1.4%	1,142,145	−11.5%	14,643
New York Yankees	79	−3.7%	966,328	−9.8%	12,550
Oakland Athletics	93	−7.9%	921,323	0.7%	11,965
Baltimore Orioles	80	−20.8%	899,950	−12.0%	11,688
Minnesota Twins	77	4.1%	797,901	−15.2%	10,782
Atlanta Braves	70	−14.6%	752,973	−25.2%	9,654
California Angels	75	−1.3%	744,190	−19.7%	9,302
Kansas City Royals	76	−10.6%	707,656	−22.3%	9,190
Texas Rangers	54	−14.3%	662,974	1.2%	8,610
San Francisco Giants	69	−23.3%	647,744	−41.4%	8,412
San Diego Padres	58	−4.9%	644,273	15.6%	8,053
Cleveland Indians	72	20.0%	626,354	5.9%	8,134
Milwaukee Brewers	65	−5.8%	600,440	−17.9%	7,601

== Uniforms ==
Most teams (16 of 24) switched from wool flannel uniforms to double knit uniforms made of nylon and rayon at the outset of 1972. The Pirates were first to adopt double knits when they moved from Forbes Field to Three Rivers Stadium in July 1970. The Cardinals switched at the start of the 1971 season, and the Orioles gradually phased out their flannels throughout 1971, becoming all-double knit in time for the postseason.

The Giants wore flannels until midseason, going to double knits at home only; the flannels would not be phased out for the road uniforms until 1973. The Red Sox switched to double knits midway through 1972, but continued to wear flannels occasionally. Only the Royals, Expos and Yankees wore flannels full-time during the 1972 season, and all three converted to double knits for 1973 (the Royals waited to switch uniforms until their new stadium opened).

== Venues ==
With the relocation from Washington, D.C. to Arlington, Texas, the Texas Rangers (formerly Washington Senators) move from Robert F. Kennedy Memorial Stadium (where they played 10 seasons) to Arlington Stadium (where they would go on to play for 22 seasons through 1993).

The Kansas City Royals would play their final game at Municipal Stadium on October 4 against the Texas Rangers, moving into Royals Stadium for the start of the 1973 season.

== Media ==
=== Television ===
NBC was the exclusive national TV broadcaster of MLB. While the network had occasionally aired a limited number of Monday night games in past seasons, 1972 was the first year that NBC signed a contract for a regular slate of Monday Night Baseball. The network continued to air the weekend Game of the Week, the All-Star Game, both League Championship Series, and the World Series.

== Retired numbers ==
- Frank Robinson had his No. 20 retired by the Baltimore Orioles on March 10. This was the first number retired by the team. Robinson would later have his No. 20 retired by the Cincinnati Reds on May 22, 1998 and the Cleveland Indians on May 27, 2017
- Pie Traynor had his No. 20 retired by the Pittsburgh Pirates on April 18. This was the third number retired by the team.
- Willie Mays had his No. 24 retired by the San Francisco Giants on May 12. This was the third number retired by the team. Mays would later have his No. 24 retired by the New York Mets on August 27, 2022.
- On June 4, the Los Angeles Dodgers retired three numbers, their first three numbers retired by the team.
  - Roy Campanella had his No. 39 retired.
  - Sandy Koufax had his No. 32 retired.
  - Jackie Robinson had his No. 42 retired. Robinson would later have his No. 42 retired in all of MLB on April 15, 1997 to acknowledge his contributions to breaking the baseball color line. From 2004, this day would be known annually as Jackie Robinson Day.
- On July 22, the New York Yankees retired No. 8 to honor two players. This was their sixth and seventh numbers retired by the team.
  - Yogi Berra had his No. 8 retired.
  - Bill Dickey had his No. 8 retired.

== See also ==
- 1972 in baseball (Events, Births, Deaths)
- 1972 Nippon Professional Baseball season
