= Gonzalo Márquez =

Venezuelan baseball player (1940–1984)

- First baseman / Outfielder
- Born: March 31, 1940; Carúpano, Sucre State, Venezuela
- Died: December 19, 1984 (aged 44); La Victoria, Aragua, Venezuela
- Batted: Left Threw: Left

MLB debut
- August 11, 1972, for the Oakland Athletics

Last MLB appearance
- June 5, 1974, for the Chicago Cubs

MLB statistics
- Batting average: .235
- Home runs: 1
- Runs batted in: 10
- Stats at Baseball Reference

Teams
- Oakland Athletics (1972–1973); Chicago Cubs (1973–1974)

Career highlights and awards
- World Series champion (1972)

Member of the Venezuelan

Baseball Hall of Fame
- Induction: 2008

Gonzalo Enrique Márquez Moya (March 31, 1940 – December 19, 1984) was a Venezuelan professional baseball player. He played as a first baseman in Major League Baseball for the Oakland Athletics (1972–73) and Chicago Cubs (1973–74). Although baseball references during his career (and afterwards) showed the year of his birth as 1946, his birth certificate showed the true year to be 1940. Márquez presented an ID that showed 1946 when he turned professional.

== Career ==
Márquez was a left-handed batter, hitting .235 (27-for-115) with one home run, 10 runs batted in, nine runs, three doubles and one stolen base in 76 games. However, his skill as a contact hitter was visible in the postseason. In eight playoff and World Series games in 1972, he hit 5-for-8 for a .625 BA with two RBIs and one run scored. He's still well remembered by the Oakland fans for his contribution off the bench.

Marquez was also known as a fine fielder at first base. On May 5, 1973, against the Cleveland Indians, he became the last left-handed player to be listed in the lineup card as a second baseman in a major-league game. He did not appear in the field at second, though.

Márquez enjoyed a long career at home in the Venezuelan Winter League, nearly all of it with the Leones del Caracas club. He compiled a record of .288 with 16 homers and 295 RBI in 833 games, from 1965 to 1984. In the 1970 Caribbean Series, he led all players with a .440 batting average and 4 stolen bases, to help the Navegantes del Magallanes win the series, marking the first time a Venezuelan team had taken the title.

Gonzalo Márquez was killed in a car accident as he was returning home from a baseball game in Valencia with two of his sons. He and the boys stopped for a roast pork sandwich at a nationally known roadside eatery, but another car prevented them from leaving the parking lot. Once Marquez did get back out onto the road, a drunk driver struck his car. Marquez died (though the two boys survived).

== See also ==
- List of players from Venezuela in Major League Baseball
