= Ángel Mangual =

Puerto Rican baseball player (1947–2021)

Angel Mangual
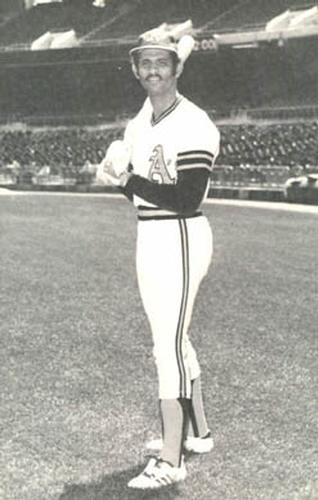
- Outfielder
- Born: March 19, 1947; Juana Díaz, Puerto Rico
- Died: February 16, 2021 (aged 73); Ponce, Puerto Rico
- Batted: Right Threw: Right

MLB debut
- September 15, 1969, for the Pittsburgh Pirates

Last MLB appearance
- June 20, 1976, for the Oakland Athletics

MLB statistics
- Batting average: .245
- Home runs: 22
- Runs batted in: 125
- Stats at Baseball Reference

Teams
- Pittsburgh Pirates (1969); Oakland Athletics (1971–1976)

Career highlights and awards
- 3× World Series champion (1972–1974)

Ángel Luis Mangual Guilbe (March 19, 1947 – February 16, 2021) was a Puerto Rican professional baseball outfielder. He played seven seasons in Major League Baseball (MLB) for the Pittsburgh Pirates and Oakland Athletics from 1969 to 1976. Nicknamed "Little Clemente", he batted and threw right-handed and was a three-time World Series champion.

Mangual was signed as an amateur free agent by the Pittsburgh Pirates in 1966 and played for four of their minor league affiliates until 1969, when the Pirates promoted him to the major leagues. After spending the 1970 season back in the minor leagues, Mangual was traded to the Athletics, where he spent the next six years and played during the team's championship seasons of 1972–1974. A decline in his performance resulted in him losing playing time, and he played his last major league game on June 20, 1976.

== Early life ==
Mangual was born in Juana Díaz, Puerto Rico, on March 19, 1947. His family were baseball fans whose idol was Roberto Clemente. Mangual's younger brother, Pepe Mangual, and their cousin, Coco Laboy, would also become major league players. He was signed as an amateur free agent by the Pittsburgh Pirates before the 1966 season. Pancho Coimbre, the scout who recruited Mangual, had also convinced the Pirates to draft Clemente back in 1954.

== Professional career ==
=== Minor leagues ===
Mangual began his professional baseball career with the Clinton Pilots, a minor league baseball team that were members of the Midwest League. There, he batted .228 with 4 home runs and 28 runs batted in (RBIs) in 80 games played. He played for the Raleigh Pirates of the Carolina League in 1967. He managed to improve his batting average to .285 and hit more home runs (7) and RBIs (46) in 136 games, but committed 17 errors and recorded a disappointing .940 fielding percentage. He was nonetheless promoted to the York Pirates of the Class-AA Eastern League (EL) the following year. Although his offensive numbers regressed to a .249 batting average, 1 home run, and 27 RBIs in 128 games, he raised his fielding percentage to .981. Mangual had a "breakout season" at York in 1969, leading the EL in batting average, RBIs, hits, doubles, and total bases at the halfway point of the season. He finished the year with the most home runs (26) and RBIs (102) in the league, and was runner-up for the batting title (.320). He was honored with the EL Most Valuable Player Award and named Player of the Year. This earned him a promotion to the Columbus Jets of the Class-AAA International League, where he played three games before being called-up to the major leagues.

=== Pittsburgh Pirates (1969) ===
Mangual made his MLB debut on September 15, 1969, at the age of 22, entering as a pinch hitter and grounding out in his only plate appearance in a 4–3 loss to the Philadelphia Phillies. He played in five more games that season, entering as a defensive replacement in three and pinch-hitting in two. Mangual spent the entire 1970 season in the minor leagues, having been the final outfielder to be cut from the spring training roster. He recorded a .281 batting average with 20 home runs and 87 RBIs during his second stint with the Jets. He was subsequently traded to the Oakland Athletics on October 20 that same year, as the player to be named later to complete the deal that sent Mudcat Grant to the Pirates one month earlier. He received the nickname "Little Clemente" around this time.

=== Oakland Athletics (1971–1976) ===
Mangual batted .286 with 4 home runs and 30 RBIs in his first year with the Athletics. After a disappointing start to the season, he was in line to be traded for Sam McDowell in mid-May, but the deal did not materialize. Mangual's performance eventually improved, and he notably hit a walk-off single in the 20th inning against the California Angels on July 9, 1971. This ended the longest scoreless game in AL history. Charlie Finley, the owner of the Athletics, phoned the team clubhouse after the game and urged Mangual to purchase a $200 suit at Finley's expense. Mangual's strong showing led to him finishing third in the American League (AL) Rookie of the Year balloting, behind Bill Parsons and winner Chris Chambliss.

In the 1972 season, Mangual's batting average dropped to .246 with 5 home runs and 32 RBIs. His defense proved to be unreliable; he made 5 errors and Reggie Jackson ended up playing nearly four times as many games at center field as Mangual. Mangual won the first of three World Series rings that year, as part of the Athletics dynasty that won three consecutive championships between 1972 and 1974. During Game 4 of the 1972 World Series, Mangual hit a walk-off single in the bottom of the ninth inning against the Cincinnati Reds. It was the last of three pinch hits in that inning, setting a World Series record. The A's won that game 3–2 and took a 3–1 lead in the series. Mangual played his final major league game on June 20, 1976, at the age of 29. He finished his final season with a .167 batting average and one RBI in just 8 games. For his career, he batted .245 with 22 home runs and 125 RBIs in 450 games.

== Later life ==
Mangual auctioned his personal replica of the Commissioner's Trophy, given to every A's player on the 1972 team by owner Charlie Finley, in August 2010. In an interview he gave eight years later, he spoke fondly of his time with the Athletics, crediting the support given to him by teammates like Reggie Jackson, Joe Rudi, and Ray Fosse. Mangual said of his teammates:

They were all good people. They came looking for me, offering their help. And to see them give me their hand made me feel like the proudest Puerto Rican in the major leagues. I felt part of the team. Every time we slapped five and said, 'Let’s go,' it gave me goosebumps. When people like that help you, it gives you the strength to keep going.

Mangual died on the morning of February 16, 2021, in Ponce, Puerto Rico. He was 73.
