= Monte Moore =

American former radio and television broadcaster

Monte Moore (born July 26, 1930) is an American former radio and television broadcaster for the Kansas City Athletics and Oakland Athletics baseball teams.

== Voice of the Athletics ==
An Oklahoma native, with a folksy, down-home style, Moore became the lead broadcaster for the Kansas City A's in 1962, when owner Charles O. Finley inserted him to replace Merle Harmon. Moore traveled west when the team moved to Oakland in 1968, remaining the team's principal radio voice through the 1977 season, and its television voice until 1980. He would return to head up the team's television broadcasts from 1988 through 1992.

=== Broadcast partners ===
During Moore’s tenure, he had a number of co-announcers with him in the booth, including Harry Caray, Bob Elson, Al Helfer, Red Rush and Jim Woods, all of whom had achieved fame as major-league broadcasters elsewhere before joining the A’s, and Jon Miller, who went on to success with the Orioles and Giants. Former major league players Curt Flood, Reggie Jackson, Harmon Killebrew, and Jim Piersall served as A’s announcers at one time, as did former player and manager Bill Rigney.

Perhaps his longest and most remembered pairing was with Ray Fosse, who joined the A's television broadcasts on a part-time basis in 1986. Fosse was the A's full-time color analyst by 1988 and his pairing with Moore remained until Moore's retirement.

Moore has said that his "worst year was 1970 with Harry Caray."

=== Catchphrase ===
Moore is fondly remembered by A's fans for his "There She Goes...", "Dinger" home run calls, "The Swinging A's" and "The Good Guys In The White Shoes !!" which he uttered many a time while calling games during the early years of A's notables such as Reggie Jackson, Catfish Hunter, Bert "Campy" Campaneris, Mark McGwire and José Canseco. He also coined the phrase "hotter 'n' a two dollar pistol" for A's players on hot streaks, "The Tater Man" for Reggie Jackson when Jackson was chasing Babe Ruth's record in 1969; "Captain Sal" for A's third baseman Sal Bando; and "It's hold 'em Rollie Fingers time" among others.

== National broadcasting experience and return to Oakland ==
Moore was part of NBC's national broadcast team when the A's appeared in the World Series against the Cincinnati Reds (1972), New York Mets (1973) and Los Angeles Dodgers (1974) and won all three. He also announced on NBC's Saturday Game of the Week broadcasts from 1978–80 and on the USA Network's Thursday Game of the Week broadcasts from 1979-83. He returned to the A's in 1985 to handle local TV play-by-play on a part-time basis with Ted Robinson until 1988, and full-time thereafter before retiring at the end of the 1992 season. Dick Stockton replaced him to start the 1993 season.

== Later career ==
Following his retirement from baseball broadcasting, Moore put his radio experience to work in heading up a radio station, KTIP 1450 AM, in Porterville, California, where he resides. Among those who came under his tutelage were the current radio voice of the USC Trojans, Pete Arbogast, and Wayne Garcia, currently the lead news anchor for KPTV in Portland, Oregon. Pete roomed with, and trained, Garcia when the latter was still in high school.

Today, Moore frequently returns to Oakland for special occasions put on by the A's honoring the past, including jersey retirements, ceremonial first pitches, autograph signings and anniversary events. He has emceed events commemorating the careers of Reggie Jackson and Dennis Eckersley and the anniversaries of Oakland A's World-Series-winning teams (1972, 1973, 1974, 1989).
