= Gene Tenace =

American baseball player and manager (born 1946)

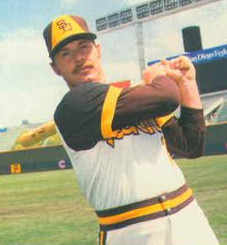
- Tenace with the San Diego Padres in 1978
- Catcher / First baseman / Manager
- Born: October 10, 1946 (age 80); Russellton, Pennsylvania, U.S.
- Batted: Right Threw: Right

MLB debut
- May 29, 1969, for the Oakland Athletics

Last MLB appearance
- September 30, 1983, for the Pittsburgh Pirates

MLB statistics
- Batting average: .241
- Home runs: 201
- Runs batted in: 674
- Stats at Baseball Reference

Teams
- As player: Oakland Athletics (1969–1976); San Diego Padres (1977–1980); St. Louis Cardinals (1981–1982); Pittsburgh Pirates (1983); As manager: Toronto Blue Jays (1991); As coach: Houston Astros (1986–1987); Toronto Blue Jays (1990–1997, 2008)

Career highlights and awards
- All-Star (1975); 6× World Series champion (1972–1974, 1982, 1992, 1993); World Series MVP (1972); Athletics Hall of Fame

Fury Gene Tenace (/ˈtɛnɪs/; born Fiore Gino Tenacci; October 10, 1946) is an American former professional baseball player and coach. He played as a catcher and first baseman in Major League Baseball from 1969 through 1983, most notably as a member of the Oakland Athletics dynasty that won three consecutive World Series championships between 1972 and 1974.

Tenace was drafted by the Kansas City Athletics from Valley High School in Lucasville, Ohio, and played for the Oakland Athletics, San Diego Padres, St. Louis Cardinals and the Pittsburgh Pirates. He batted and threw right-handed. Despite his relatively modest career batting average of .241, his career on-base percentage of .388 is the fourth-highest all-time among qualifying catchers, and his .429 slugging percentage was considerably above the average in the era he played. His 46.8 Baseball Reference Wins Above Replacement (WAR) ranks 13th all-time among catchers, and his 7-year peak WAR is tied with Roy Campanella for 12th all-time among catchers. Also of note is that his career rWAR is fifth highest among all sub .250 hitters. Tenace's career 140 Weighted Runs Created Plus (wRC+) are tied with Mike Piazza for the highest all-time among catchers. Tenace won the 1972 World Series Most Valuable Player Award.

After his playing days ended, Tenace coached for several organizations, most notably for the Toronto Blue Jays. In 2023, he was inducted into the Athletics Hall of Fame.

== Playing career ==
=== Oakland Athletics (1969–1976) ===
1970 postcard of Tenace for Oakland Athletics

Tenace was selected in baseball's first entry draft, being taken in the 20th round of the 1965 Major League Baseball draft by the then Kansas City Athletics. Tenace made his major league debut for Oakland on May 29, 1969, against the Detroit Tigers at Oakland–Alameda County Coliseum where he went 0-for-4 with two strikeouts in an 8–4 Oakland loss. He hit the first home run of his career on June 6, 1969, at Tiger Stadium against Earl Wilson of the Detroit Tigers. He finished the 1969 season with a .158 batting average, a home run and two runs batted in, appearing in just 38 games as a third-string catcher.

He continued to play the next two years as the third-string catcher before serving as Dave Duncan's backup in 1971. Tenace entered the 1972 season backing up Duncan, but was given a chance to show his abilities by being made the team's regular catcher in the post-season. Tenace took full advantage of this opportunity, excelling in the 1972 playoffs and World Series. In the 1972 American League Championship Series against the Detroit Tigers, he drove in the clinching run in Oakland's 2–1 victory in Game 5; it was his only hit of the series. Tenace's heroics made up for an error in Game 4 of the series when he had to play second base (for the first time since high school) in the late innings due to regular second baseman Dick Green getting hurt and backup second baseman Ted Kubiak having to play shortstop due to Bert Campaneris being suspended. Tenace dropped a throw from Sal Bando on a potential game-ending double play attempt in the bottom of the 10th which kept the inning alive as the Tigers eventually won.

He put himself in the spotlight once again in Game 1 of the 1972 World Series when the Athletics faced the Cincinnati Reds. He became the first player to hit home runs in his first two World Series at bats and drove in all three runs in the A's 3–2 victory. Prior to Tenace's feat, only eight other players had homered in their first World Series at bat. In Game 4, the A's were losing 2–1, with their only run to that point coming on Tenace's solo home run. A ninth-inning one-out rally consisting of four singles, with Tenace's the second and the rest coming from pinch hitters, won the game against Cincinnati's ace relief pitcher, Clay Carroll. He hit a three-run home run in the A's Game 5 loss. Before Game 6 of the 1972 Series, he was the target of a death threat; an intoxicated Reds fan tried to enter the game with a loaded gun in his pocket, threatening to shoot Tenace if he hit another home run. In Game 7, he was once again the hero, driving in two runs in a 3–2 victory for Oakland. In total, he went 8-for-23 in the Series, with four home runs and 9 RBI to earn the World Series Most Valuable Player Award.

Tenace's heroics helped him earn a full-time job in Oakland's lineup. He served as the team's starting first baseman for two seasons, while still serving as the backup catcher to Ray Fosse. He had his roles reversed in 1975, starting at catcher while backing up first base. As a regular starter for the A's, Tenace had a low batting average but a fair amount of power, hitting 20 home runs in four consecutive years in Oakland, finishing among the top 10 home run hitters in the American League each year. He further made up for his lack of a high batting average by sporting a tremendous batting eye. He drew over 100 walks in a season three times for Oakland, and led the American League in walks in 1974, making up for a career-low .211 average that year. Statistically, his best year with Oakland was in 1975, when he hit a career-best 29 home runs and drove in 87 runs, drew 106 walks, finished 18th in the American League Most Valuable Player Award balloting and was selected to be the starting first baseman for the American League in the 1975 All-Star Game.

As a member of the A's, Tenace hit what turned out to be the final home run in the history of Kansas City's Municipal Stadium on September 30, 1972, in a 10–5 Oakland victory over the Kansas City Royals.

=== San Diego Padres (1977–1980) ===
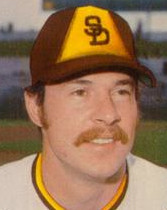
Tenace with San Diego, c. 1977

Tenace was one of several Athletics who became free agents after the 1976 season and participated in a newly created re-entry draft, in which teams acquired the rights to negotiate with veteran free agents. Tenace and teammate Rollie Fingers were the first players from that draft to sign, with both joining the San Diego Padres in December of that year. In four years as a starter with the Padres, his power numbers dropped in part due to the cavernous dimensions of San Diego Jack Murphy Stadium, only reaching 20 home runs once; but his batting eye remained, recording three more seasons of 100 walks, with a career best of 125 in 1977. In 1979, Tenace led National League catchers with a .998 fielding percentage, committing only one error in 94 games. He recorded an on-base percentage of over .390 in each of his years in San Diego, and finished third in the National League in that department in three consecutive years.

On August 1, 1979, Tenace was part of a bench-clearing brawl against the Atlanta Braves. After hitting a home run off of pitcher Eddie Solomon, he charged the mound when Solomon apparently said something to him, and the benches cleared. No punches were thrown, and the Braves won 5–4.

=== St. Louis Cardinals (1981–1982) ===
After the 1980 season, Tenace, Fingers, Bob Shirley, and Bob Geren joined the St. Louis Cardinals in a trade for Terry Kennedy and six minor league players. In his two years in St. Louis, Tenace primarily played against left-handed pitchers, platooning with Darrell Porter. As a member of the Cardinals team he won the 1982 World Series, giving him four World Series rings.

=== Pittsburgh Pirates (1983) ===
Tenace played his final season as a utility player and pinch-hitter, appearing in 53 games and batting just .177 with 6 RBI for the Pittsburgh Pirates in 1983. He retired after being released the following year in spring training.

== Coaching career ==
Tenace became a coach after retiring as a player. He was touted as a possible managerial candidate during his later years. The Pittsburgh Pirates became strongly interested in the possibility of hiring Tenace as their manager to replace Chuck Tanner. When the year ended, however, Tanner was still the manager, so Tenace became a coach at the Major League level with the Houston Astros in 1986 and 1987, and later coached with the Toronto Blue Jays from 1990 to 1997. When manager Cito Gaston was sidelined with a herniated disc in 1991, Tenace served as the team's interim manager, going 19–14 and keeping Toronto competitive en route to an eventual American League Eastern Division title. He was part of Toronto's World Series-winning teams in 1992 and 1993, giving him six rings in six World Series appearances as a player and a coach. After he left the Jays, he joined the Boston Red Sox organization, serving as hitting coach for their Triple-A affiliate Pawtucket Red Sox in 1999, and Double-A affiliate Trenton Thunder in 2001. He then served as a hitting instructor for the St. Louis Cardinals organization. He was re-hired as the Blue Jays' hitting coach on June 20, 2008, when Cito Gaston replaced John Gibbons as the team's manager. Tenace replaced hitting coach Gary Denbo. He was one of two members of Gaston's old coaching staff from his last World Series championship team who were brought back to the team (third base coach Nick Leyva being the other). He announced his retirement following the 2009 season.

=== Managerial record ===
| Team | Year | Regular season | | | | | Postseason | | | |
| Team | Year | Games | Won | Lost | Win % | Finish | Won | Lost | Win % | Result |
|---|---|---|---|---|---|---|---|---|---|---|
| TOR | 1991 | 33 | 19 | 14 | .576 | interim | – | – | – | – |
| Total | | 33 | 19 | 14 | .576 | | 0 | 0 | – | |

== Hitting approach ==
Tenace advocates a more aggressive approach to hitting. Under his guidance, hitters spend less time working the count and more time preparing to hit. He stresses the mental part of hitting, such as the mental preparation for what a pitcher will do, rather than just the physical aspect. Under Tenace, the philosophy of hitting can be described as "Grip It And Rip It" and more of an old school approach to hitting.

During the 2008 season, prior to the hiring of Gaston, the Blue Jays had a record of 35–39. Once Gaston and his coaches took over the Blue Jays went 51–37 to finish with an 86–76 record. The offensive improvements under Gaston were one of the reasons for the resurgence and as the hitting coach, Tenace was credited with rejuvenating a stagnant offense. Adam Lind commented: "The thing is, a lot of people can teach you how to hit, but not a lot of people can teach you how to hit in the big leagues", referring to the major league experience of Gaston and Tenace. Blue Jays' former center fielder Vernon Wells has said he likes the approach to hitting that Tenace teaches: "One thing Gene talks about is having that approach mentally when you go up there, in your mind you already guarantee yourself that one run on third, but you want to do more than that. Gene always says that first runner is a gimme, you should be able to come through in pretty much every situation like that. And then you try to do more damage than just that one run".

== Career statistics ==
In a 15-year major league career, Tenace played in 1,555 games, accumulating 1,060 hits in 4,390 at bats for a .241 career batting average along with 201 home runs, 674 runs batted in and an on-base percentage of .388. He not only caught nearly 900 games, but also played first base over 600 times. Tenace ended his career with a .986 fielding percentage as a catcher and a .993 fielding percentage as a first baseman. He reached 20 home runs in five of his seven seasons as a regular, with a high of 29 in 1975. After becoming an everyday player in 1973, he did not have an on-base average below .370 until his final year; his OBP was above .400 five times and over .390 (about 60 points above the league average) an additional three times, ending his career with an impressive .388 on-base percentage. Six times he drew more than 100 bases on balls, and he led his league twice. He set the American League record for having the lowest batting average while leading the league in walks in 1974 when he posted a .211 batting average with a league-leading 110 walks. In 1977, he had a .415 on-base percentage while posting a .233 batting average, the second lowest batting average with a .400 on-base percentage in major league history. Less than half of his career trips to first base came via base hits, reaching 1,075 times through walks (984) and being hit by pitches (91) as opposed to only 1,060 hits. His ratio of on-base percentage to batting average (1.61) is the highest of any player in major league history with at least 4,000 plate appearances.

In his book, The Bill James Historical Baseball Abstract, baseball historian Bill James ranked Tenace 23rd all-time among major league catchers. Chuck Rosciam, a baseball historian and a member of the Society for American Baseball Research, ranked Tenace as the fourth-greatest offensive catcher in MLB history, behind Mike Piazza, Roger Bresnahan, and Mickey Cochrane. Among major league catchers, Tenace is fourth overall in career on-base percentage (OBP) behind Mickey Cochrane, Wally Schang and Joe Mauer. He is tied with Johnny Bench and Joe Torre for third in career on-base plus slugging percentage (OPS) behind only Roy Campanella and Yogi Berra.

== Notable achievements ==
- AL All-Star (1975)
- 1972 World Series MVP
- 2-time League Bases on Balls Leader (1974/AL & 1977/NL)
- 20-Home Run Seasons: 5 (1973–1976 & 1979)
- Caught Vida Blue's no-hitter on September 21, 1970
- Won four World Series as a player with the Oakland Athletics (1972, 1973 & 1974) and the St. Louis Cardinals (1982)
- Won two World Series as a coach with the Toronto Blue Jays (1992 & 1993)
- October winner of the S. Rae Hickok "professional athlete of the year" award (1972)

== Appearances in other media ==
- Tenace did a voice cameo in an episode of The Simpsons entitled "Regarding Margie" in 2006.
- Tenace appeared in a television commercial for the Toronto Blue Jays in 2008.
- Tenace was mentioned by sportscaster Champ Kind in the party scene in Anchorman: The Legend of Ron Burgundy while describing his signature catchphrase. "Gene Tenace at the plate, and Whammmy!"
- Tenace is portrayed on one of the Floodwall Murals in Portsmouth, Ohio honoring local Major League Baseball players.
