= 1972 World Series =

69th edition of Major League Baseball's championship series

Team (Wins)	Managers	Season
Oakland Athletics (4)	Dick Williams	93–62 (.600), GA: 5 1/2
Cincinnati Reds (3)	Sparky Anderson	95–59 (.617), GA: 10 1/2
- Dates: October 14–22
- Venue(s): Riverfront Stadium (Cincinnati); Oakland–Alameda County Coliseum (Oakland)
- MVP: Gene Tenace (Oakland)
- Umpires: Chris Pelekoudas (NL), Bill Haller (AL), Mel Steiner (NL), Frank Umont (AL), Bob Engel (NL), Jim Honochick (AL)
- Hall of Famers: Athletics : Dick Williams (manager); Reggie Jackson (DNP); Catfish Hunter; Rollie Fingers; Reds: Sparky Anderson (manager); Johnny Bench; Joe Morgan; Tony Pérez

Broadcast
- Television: NBC
- TV announcers: Curt Gowdy; Al Michaels (in Cincinnati); Monte Moore (in Oakland); Tony Kubek
- Radio: NBC
- Radio announcers: Jim Simpson; Monte Moore (in Cincinnati); Al Michaels (in Oakland)
- ALCS: Oakland Athletics over Detroit Tigers (3–2)
- NLCS: Cincinnati Reds over Pittsburgh Pirates (3–2)

The 1972 World Series was the championship series of Major League Baseball's (MLB) 1972 season. The 69th edition of the World Series, it was a best-of-seven playoff between the American League (AL) champion Oakland Athletics and the National League (NL) champion Cincinnati Reds. The Athletics won in seven games for their sixth World Series championship and first since 1930, when the team was still based in Philadelphia. This was the first major professional sports championship ever won by a San Francisco Bay Area-based team.

This was the first World Series in which both teams wore pullover jerseys, a style that would remain the norm until 1982, after which at least one team in the Fall Classic would wear them each year through 1990, after which traditional button-front jerseys once again predominated. Coincidentally, both this World Series and the 1990 World Series featured the same two teams, the Athletics and the Reds, though with far different results; the Athletics won this one in a hard fought seven games, while the Reds swept the defending champion Athletics in four games in 1990.

== Background ==
The Athletics won the American League West division by 5 1/2 games over the Chicago White Sox, then defeated the Detroit Tigers three games to two in the American League Championship Series. The Cincinnati Reds won the National League West division by 10 1/2 games over both the Los Angeles Dodgers and the Houston Astros. The Reds dethroned the defending World Series champion Pittsburgh Pirates three games to two in the National League Championship Series, marking the first year in which an LCS series in either league went the full five games since divisional play was introduced in 1969. The Reds (95–59 (.617)) won one fewer game than the Pirates (96–59 (.619)) during the strike-reduced regular season and became the first team in MLB history to reach the World Series without having the best record in its respective league. In each of the first six League Championship Series, the team with the better record advanced to the World Series. (The Athletics' (93–62 (.600)) had the best record in the American League in 1972, but the AL pennant winner the next three seasons did not.)

This was Cincinnati's second trip to the World Series in three years, previously falling to Baltimore in five games in the 1970 World Series. It was Oakland's first-ever trip to the Series, and the first for the franchise since 1931, when the team was located in Philadelphia.

This was a matchup of the two premier MLB dynasties of the 1970s, with the Reds winning two World Series (1975–76) in four WS appearances, while the Athletics won three straight (1972–74). Iconoclastic club owner Charlie Finley's "Swingin' A's" featured day-glo uniforms, white shoes, much facial hair, colorful nicknames, and explosive personalities, while "The Big Red Machine" was a more traditional franchise with a more traditional look (including a facial-hair ban)—and an everyday lineup with three future Hall of Famers as well as all-time hits king, Pete Rose. The Series was dubbed "The Hairs vs. the Squares."

Oakland played the Series without its star outfielder Reggie Jackson, who was injured (pulled hamstring) stealing home in the second inning of the final game of the ALCS at Detroit on October 12. Left-handed reliever Darold Knowles was also missing for the Athletics, breaking his thumb on September 27, less than three weeks before the Series opener.

With Jackson out, the Athletics were decided underdogs. George Hendrick was inserted into center field for Jackson. And while Hendrick only went 2-for-15 (.133), unheralded catcher Gene Tenace stepped up. Tenace had a poor regular season, hitting only .225 with just five home runs and 32 RBI in 82 games played. He was even worse in the AL Championship series against Detroit, going 1 for 17 (.059), although his one hit drove in the go-ahead run in Game 5. In the World Series however, Tenace was spectacular, hitting four home runs equaling the World Series mark set by Babe Ruth, Lou Gehrig, and Hank Bauer. He also had nine RBI in the Series—no other Oakland player had more than one. Tenace was voted World Series MVP.

By contrast, the stellar Oakland pitching kept the middle of the Reds lineup quiet for most of the series. Johnny Bench (.270 avg., 40 HR, 125 RBI, NL MVP), Tony Pérez (.283 avg., 21 HR, 90 RBI), and Denis Menke (9 HR, 50 RBI), combined for only two homers and five RBI the entire Series. Perez did lead both teams with 10 hits and a .435 batting average, but 8 of his 10 hits were singles. It didn't help that the Reds' "table-setters," Pete Rose and Joe Morgan were a combined 1 for 28 through the first four games, when the Reds lost three of those games.

The teams were fairly equal statistically, each club totaling 46 hits with the same .209 batting average (the combined batting averages were the lowest recorded in a 7-game World Series). The Reds outscored the Athletics by five runs, 21–16, but all four of their losses were by a single run. Six of the seven games in the series were decided by one run, marking perhaps the most closely contested World Series in history.

== Summary ==
AL Oakland Athletics (4) vs. NL Cincinnati Reds (3)

Game	Date	Score	Location	Time	Attendance
1	October 14	Oakland Athletics – 3, Cincinnati Reds – 2	Riverfront Stadium	2:18	52,918
2	October 15	Oakland Athletics – 2, Cincinnati Reds – 1	Riverfront Stadium	2:26	53,224
3	October 18†	Cincinnati Reds – 1, Oakland Athletics – 0	Oakland–Alameda County Coliseum	2:24	49,410
4	October 19	Cincinnati Reds – 2, Oakland Athletics – 3	Oakland–Alameda County Coliseum	2:06	49,410
5	October 20	Cincinnati Reds – 5, Oakland Athletics – 4	Oakland–Alameda County Coliseum	2:26	49,410
6	October 21	Oakland Athletics – 1, Cincinnati Reds – 8	Riverfront Stadium	2:21	52,737
7	October 22	Oakland Athletics – 3, Cincinnati Reds – 2	Riverfront Stadium	2:50	56,040

†: postponed from October 17 due to rain

== Matchups ==
=== Game 1 ===
Ken Holtzman became the first Athletic pitcher to win a World Series game since Lefty Grove in 1931.

October 14, 1972 1:00 pm (ET) at Riverfront Stadium in Cincinnati, Ohio 51 °F (11 °C), mostly sunny
Team	1	2	3	4	5	6	7	8	9	R	H	E
Oakland	0	2	0	0	1	0	0	0	0	3	4	0
Cincinnati	0	1	0	1	0	0	0	0	0	2	7	0
WP: Ken Holtzman (1–0) LP: Gary Nolan (0–1) Sv: Vida Blue (1); Home runs: OAK: Gene Tenace 2 (2); CIN: None

Oakland jumped out to a one-game series lead behind catcher Gene Tenace, who hit a home run in each of his first two at-bats. Tenace became the first player ever to homer in his two initial Series plate appearances, a feat later matched by Andruw Jones of the Atlanta Braves in 1996. Only two Oakland players collected hits, a pair each from Tenace and Bert Campaneris. The Athletics received a combined four innings of shutout relief from Rollie Fingers and Vida Blue to secure the victory for starter Ken Holtzman. Blue stranded the potential tying run at third base to end the game by inducing Pete Rose to ground out to second base.

=== Game 2 ===
Joe Rudi hit a home run and caught a ball right up the wall in the 9th

October 15, 1972 1:00 pm (ET) at Riverfront Stadium in Cincinnati, Ohio
Team	1	2	3	4	5	6	7	8	9	R	H	E
Oakland	0	1	1	0	0	0	0	0	0	2	9	2
Cincinnati	0	0	0	0	0	0	0	0	1	1	6	0
WP: Catfish Hunter (1–0) LP: Ross Grimsley (0–1) Sv: Rollie Fingers (1); Home runs: OAK: Joe Rudi (1); CIN: None

The Game 2 hero was Athletics left fielder Joe Rudi, who smacked a home run and added a sparkling, game-saving catch up against the wall in the ninth inning on a ball hit by Denis Menke. Catfish Hunter pitched eight strong innings, consistently wiggling out of trouble, and also added an RBI single in the second off Ross Grimsley. The Reds' failure to produce in the clutch was as much the story as Rudi's heroics as Cincinnati had leadoff baserunners in five innings but only scored a run in the ninth.

The Athletics scored a run in the second when George Hendrick beat out a double-play grounder after Sal Bando led off with a single. Hendrick went to second on a Dick Green single and scored on a close play at the plate on a Hunter single. Bert Campaneris followed with a hit and Green attempted to score, but was successfully thrown out at the plate by Pete Rose. The Athletics had four hits in the inning, but only scored one run. Rudi extended the lead to 2–0 with his home run in the 3rd.

In the ninth, Tony Pérez led off with a base hit before Rudi's catch of Menke's drive for the first out. Oakland first baseman Mike Hegan then made another great defensive play when César Gerónimo, the next Reds hitter, lined a shot that appeared headed down the line for extra bases. Hegan dove for the ball, knocked it down, and dove for the bag, barely beating Geronimo. Pérez took second and scored on a Hal McRae single through the middle. Rollie Fingers then relieved Hunter and induced pinch hitter Julián Javier to pop out to Hegan in foul territory to end the game. The World Series home loss was the seventh straight for the Reds, which included three in the 1961 World Series against the New York Yankees (at Crosley Field) and two in the 1970 World Series against the Baltimore Orioles.

Prior to the game Jackie Robinson, the first black major league player of the modern era, made his final public appearance (he died nine days later) in an on-field ceremony to mark the 25th anniversary of his breaking of the color line. Former Reds radio announcer Red Barber, who had been with the Brooklyn Dodgers' broadcast crew for Robinson's inaugural 1947 season with that team, hosted the ceremony. In a brief speech (following introductory remarks by MLB commissioner Bowie Kuhn), Robinson expressed his desire to see a black manager in the majors, a color barrier that hadn't yet been broken. Two years later, Frank Robinson was hired in October 1974 to manage the Cleveland Indians to break that barrier. It would take until 1992 before another black manager, Cito Gaston, would win the World Series with the Toronto Blue Jays (Gaston would repeat this for Toronto the following year.)

=== Game 3 ===
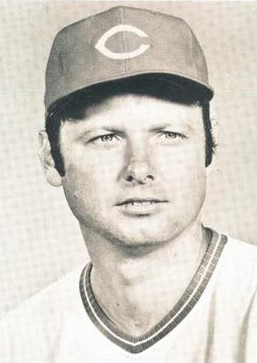
Jack Billingham allowed three total hits in eight innings.

October 18, 1972 5:30 pm (PT) at Oakland–Alameda County Coliseum in Oakland, California 63 °F (17 °C), partly cloudy
Team	1	2	3	4	5	6	7	8	9	R	H	E
Cincinnati	0	0	0	0	0	0	1	0	0	1	4	2
Oakland	0	0	0	0	0	0	0	0	0	0	3	2
WP: Jack Billingham (1–0) LP: Blue Moon Odom (0–1) Sv: Clay Carroll (1)

Heavy storms delayed Game 3 by a day, but the Reds got back into the series behind a strong performance from starter Jack Billingham, who held the Athletics to three hits in eight innings. The Reds pushed across the game's only run in the seventh when César Gerónimo singled home Tony Pérez. Pérez scored despite slipping on the still damp grass as he rounded third. Oakland shortstop Bert Campaneris was apparently unaware that Pérez had slipped; otherwise, it appeared Campaneris may have had a play at the plate. Clay Carroll pitched the ninth for the save.

A rare trick play occurred in the eighth inning. The Reds had Joe Morgan on third and Bobby Tolan on first base with Rollie Fingers pitching to NL MVP Johnny Bench. Fingers pitched carefully to Bench before Tolan stole second base on ball three. After the stolen base, with the count 3–2 on Bench, Athletics manager Dick Williams visited the mound. After a long discussion, he motioned for an intentional walk to Bench. Athletics catcher Gene Tenace stood to catch ball four, but at the last second returned to his crouch as Fingers delivered a strike on the outside corner. Bench watched the pitch go by for strike three.

=== Game 4 ===
October 19, 1972 5:30 pm (PT) at Oakland–Alameda County Coliseum in Oakland, California 59 °F (15 °C), overcast
Team	1	2	3	4	5	6	7	8	9	R	H	E
Cincinnati	0	0	0	0	0	0	0	2	0	2	7	1
Oakland	0	0	0	0	1	0	0	0	2	3	10	1
WP: Rollie Fingers (1–0) LP: Clay Carroll (0–1); Home runs: CIN: None; OAK: Gene Tenace (3)

Gene Tenace and Oakland non-starters put the Athletics up 3 games to 1.

The game was a pitchers' duel between a pair of left-handed starters: Cincinnati's Don Gullett and Oakland's Ken Holtzman. Through seven innings, the game's lone run was a result of a fifth-inning home run by Tenace, his third homer of the series. With two outs in the top of the eighth inning and Dave Concepción on second base, Athletics manager Dick Williams replaced Holtzman with left-hander Vida Blue to face left-handed hitters Joe Morgan and Bobby Tolan. Blue walked Morgan and allowed a clutch two-run double to Tolan, giving Cincinnati the lead as the Reds seemed poised to tie the series at 2 games apiece.

In the bottom of the ninth, however, with one out, the Athletics strung together four consecutive hits to score two runs. Pinch hitter Gonzalo Márquez singled, Tenace followed with a single, Don Mincher followed with another pinch-hit single scoring pinch-runner Allan Lewis to tie the game before a third pinch-hitter, Ángel Mangual, singled off Clay Carroll to score Tenace with the game-winner to put Oakland up three games to one. It was the first time that a team collected three pinch hits in the same World Series inning.

=== Game 5 ===
Pete Rose kept the Reds alive with a lead-off home run and the go-ahead run in the 9th inning

October 20, 1972 1:00 pm (PT) at Oakland–Alameda County Coliseum in Oakland, California 63 °F (17 °C), mostly cloudy
Team	1	2	3	4	5	6	7	8	9	R	H	E
Cincinnati	1	0	0	1	1	0	0	1	1	5	8	0
Oakland	0	3	0	1	0	0	0	0	0	4	7	2
WP: Ross Grimsley (1–1) LP: Rollie Fingers (1–1) Sv: Jack Billingham (1); Home runs: CIN: Pete Rose (1), Denis Menke (1); OAK: Gene Tenace (4)

Up three games to one and with ace Catfish Hunter on the mound, the Athletics looked poised to close out Cincinnati. Compounding problems for the Reds, their ace pitcher Gary Nolan, who had been battling shoulder and neck issues during the second half of the regular season, was unable to pitch Game 5, forcing part-time starter Jim McGlothlin to start instead. But two of the struggling Reds, Pete Rose and Joe Morgan who were a combined 1 for 28 at the plate in the first four games, stepped up to make key plays. Rose led off the game with a home run, and he would also drive in the game-winning run in the ninth inning. The game ended dramatically when Morgan threw out the potential game-tying run at the plate as the Reds staved off elimination.

Trailing 1–0 in the second, Gene Tenace hit his fourth home run of the series, a three-run shot, to put Oakland up by two. McGlothlin was removed after pitching just three innings. The Reds cut the lead to 3–2 in the fourth on a home run by Denis Menke. Gonzalo Marquez put the Athletics back in front by two runs with a pinch-hit RBI single in the fourth.

The Reds continued to answer. With two outs in the fifth, Joe Morgan walked. On the first pitch to Bobby Tolan, Morgan broke for second and was able to score when Tolan lined a base hit into right-center field.

The speedy Morgan and Tolan collaborated once again in the eighth. Morgan again walked, stole second and scored on another Tolan single to tie the game at four. Tolan took second when rightfielder Matty Alou slipped while fielding the ball. The next batter, Johnny Bench, tried to lay down a bunt and the ball appeared to hit him in fair territory as he was running out of the box, but the home plate umpire ruled the ball hit Bench in the box. Bench ended up striking out. Tolan stole third as Tony Perez struck out, and then Denis Menke stranded Tolan by striking out.

In the ninth, Rose singled in the go-ahead run to give the Reds a 5–4 lead. Game 3 starter Jack Billingham came in to relieve in the ninth, but the Athletics put runners on the corners with one out. Bert Campaneris hit a foul pop behind first base that Tony Pérez drifted back and appeared to call for. But second baseman Morgan raced over, waved Perez off, caught the ball, slipped on the grass but got up and fired a throw to nail pinch runner Blue Moon Odom, who had tagged from third.

The Friday afternoon contest was the last non-weekend World Series day game. The three games in Oakland had all been scheduled to be played at night, but Game 3 was rained out, forcing Game 5 to be played on a Friday, originally scheduled as a travel day. The game was played in the afternoon (1 p.m. PT) to allow ample time for the teams to travel to Cincinnati for Game 6 the next day.

=== Game 6 ===
October 21, 1972 1:00 pm (ET) at Riverfront Stadium in Cincinnati, Ohio 52 °F (11 °C), overcast
Team	1	2	3	4	5	6	7	8	9	R	H	E
Oakland	0	0	0	0	1	0	0	0	0	1	7	1
Cincinnati	0	0	0	1	1	1	5	0	X	8	10	0
WP: Ross Grimsley (2–1) LP: Vida Blue (0–1) Sv: Tom Hall (1); Home runs: OAK: None; CIN: Johnny Bench (1)

Back at the friendly confines of Riverfront Stadium, the Reds tied the series at three games apiece with a rout. Johnny Bench, who had no RBIs in the series to that point, broke a scoreless tie in the fourth with a homer off starter Vida Blue. The Athletics fought back on a Dick Green RBI double in their half of the fifth, but from then on it was all Reds. Dave Concepción had a sacrifice fly in the fifth, and Tony Pérez an RBI single in the sixth (his first RBI of the Series). The Reds then broke it open with a five-run seventh, an RBI single by Joe Morgan and a pair of two-run singles by Bobby Tolan and César Gerónimo. The win was the Reds' first World Series victory at home since Game 7 of the 1940 World Series, snapping a 7-game losing streak in World Series home games, which is tied for the longest such streak in MLB history (Cubs from 1918–1935). Prior to the game, an intoxicated Reds fan was caught trying to enter Riverfront Stadium with a loaded gun in his pocket, threatening to shoot Gene Tenace if he hit another home run.

=== Game 7 ===
Gene Tenace capped off a World Series MVP performance with the go-ahead run in the sixth inning.

October 22, 1972 1:00 pm (ET) at Riverfront Stadium in Cincinnati, Ohio 62 °F (17 °C), cloudy
Team	1	2	3	4	5	6	7	8	9	R	H	E
Oakland	1	0	0	0	0	2	0	0	0	3	6	1
Cincinnati	0	0	0	0	1	0	0	1	0	2	4	2
WP: Catfish Hunter (2–0) LP: Pedro Borbón (0–1) Sv: Rollie Fingers (2)

Gene Tenace capped a spectacular World Series with two hits, two RBI and he also scored the game-winning run in the sixth inning on Sal Bando's double.

Oakland scored an unearned run in the first inning off Jack Billingham when Reds center fielder Bobby Tolan misplayed a fly ball by Mangual into a three-base error. Mangual scored on a two-out single by Tenace on a ball that hit a seam in the Astroturf and bounced over the head of third baseman Denis Menke. The Reds tied the game in the fifth on a bases loaded sacrifice fly to the center field wall by Hal McRae. However, McRae was pinch hitting for Billingham who had allowed no earned runs in 13 2/3 innings in the series against the Athletics. His replacement in the sixth inning, Pedro Borbón, surrendered RBI doubles to Tenace and Bando. Bando's drive appeared catchable, but Tolan pulled up short of the wall due to a strained hamstring and the ball went over Tolan to the base of the wall. He was later removed from the game on a double switch. The Reds closed to within 3–2 in the eighth on a sacrifice fly by Perez. In the ninth inning, Athletics closer Rollie Fingers retired the first two hitters, César Gerónimo and Dave Concepción, before Darrel Chaney was hit by pitch. That created a rare "golden pitch" situation whereby either team could win on the next pitch. However, on the first pitch of the at-bat, Pete Rose lined out to left field to end the game, and the A's clinched their first championship in 42 years.

== Composite box ==
1972 World Series (4–3): Oakland Athletics (A.L.) over Cincinnati Reds (N.L.)

Team	1	2	3	4	5	6	7	8	9	R	H	E
Oakland Athletics	1	6	1	1	3	2	0	0	2	16	46	9
Cincinnati Reds	1	1	0	3	3	1	6	4	2	21	46	5
Total attendance: 363,149 Average attendance: 51,878; Winning player's share: $20,705 Losing player's share: $15,080

This was the second of three consecutive years in which the World Series went seven games and the champion was outscored. Six of the games were decided by one run, the sole exception was Game 6, an 8–1 Reds' win.

== Broadcasting ==
NBC aired the series on both television and radio. Curt Gowdy (on television) and Jim Simpson (on radio) alternated play-by-play with team announcers Al Michaels (Reds) and Monte Moore (Athletics).

Tony Kubek, who had served as an in-the-stands reporter for NBC's four previous World Series telecasts, was promoted to the booth as a color analyst, becoming the first former player to serve in that capacity on a Series telecast since Joe Garagiola in 1961.

Michaels was, at 27, the second youngest person to call play-by-play of a World Series telecast. Only Vin Scully, who called the 1953 World Series at 25, was younger. Joe Buck would tie Michaels when he called the 1996 World Series, also at age 27; but unlike Michaels and Scully, who only called parts of the telecast, Buck did play-by-play for every inning of every game.

== Aftermath ==
Hall of Famer and Civil Rights trailblazer Jackie Robinson died of a heart attack two days after the series ended. Robinson had thrown out the first pitch in Game 2 in the World Series. In addressing the crowd, he said he hoped to see a black MLB manager soon. Frank Robinson, no relation, achieved that in 1974.

The World Series victory for the Oakland Athletics was the first for the franchise since the days of Connie Mack when the team was in Philadelphia and had won in 1930. The victory ensured manager Dick Williams' return for another year. It was the Athletics' sixth World Series title, and the first of three consecutive titles. This was the last time to date that an American League team had won a World Series Game 7 on the road until 2017, when the Houston Astros did so in Los Angeles.

The Reds would go on to form a dynasty of their own, becoming the third NL team (following the Chicago Cubs in 1907–08 and the New York Giants in 1921–22) to win consecutive World Series in 1975 and 1976.

These two teams met again in the World Series 18 years later in 1990. Their managers would meet again in the Fall Classic 12 years later in 1984, helming different teams and swapping leagues.

== See also ==
- 1972 Japan Series
- Golden pitch
