= Bert Campaneris =

Cuban baseball player (born 1942)

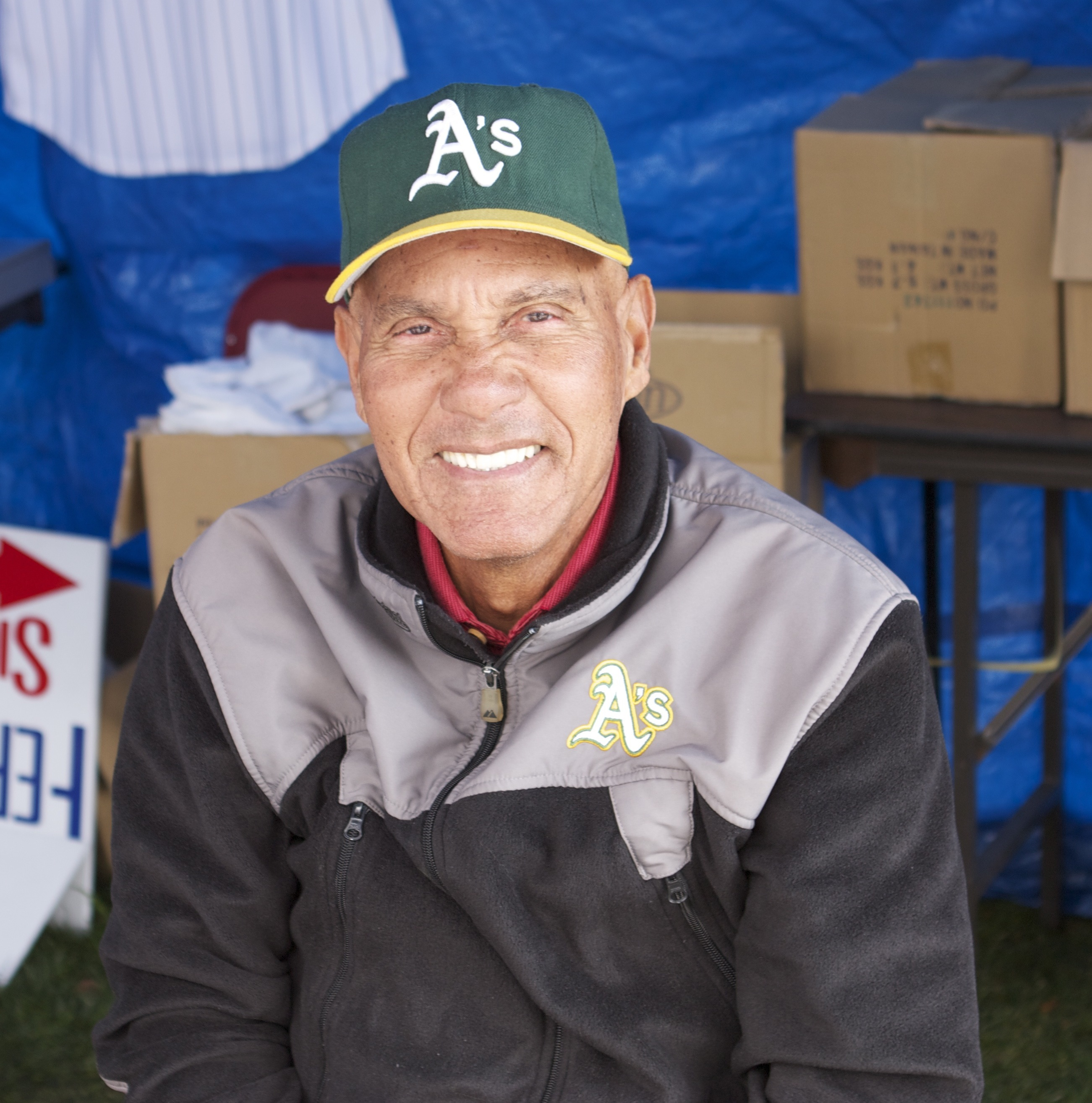
- Campaneris in 2012
- Shortstop
- Born: March 9, 1942 (age 84); Pueblo Nuevo, Cuba
- Batted: Right Threw: Right

MLB debut
- July 23, 1964, for the Kansas City Athletics

Last MLB appearance
- October 1, 1983, for the New York Yankees

MLB statistics
- Batting average: .259
- Hits: 2,249
- Home runs: 79
- Runs batted in: 646
- Stolen bases: 649
- Stats at Baseball Reference

Teams
- Kansas City / Oakland Athletics (1964–1976); Texas Rangers (1977–1979); California Angels (1979–1981); New York Yankees (1983)

Career highlights and awards
- 6× All-Star (1968, 1972–1975, 1977); 3× World Series champion (1972–1974); 6× AL stolen base leader (1965–1968, 1970, 1972); Athletics Hall of Fame
Medals
Representing Cuba
Amateur World Series
| Gold medal – first place | 1961 San José | Team |

Dagoberto Campaneris Blanco (born March 9, 1942), nicknamed "Bert" or "Campy", is a Cuban American former professional baseball shortstop, who played Major League Baseball (MLB) for four American League (AL) teams, primarily the Kansas City / Oakland Athletics. One of the mainstays of the Athletics' championship teams of 1972 to 1974, he holds the A's franchise records for career games played (1795), hits (1882), and at bats (7180). In 2019, Campaneris was inducted into the Athletics Hall of Fame.

Campaneris led the AL in stolen bases six times between 1965 and 1972 and retired with the seventh-most steals in MLB history (649). Defensively, he mainly played shortstop, but appeared at every position (including designated hitter) at some point is his career, with one appearance each at pitcher, catcher, first base, and right field. Campaneris led the league in putouts three times; his career totals at shortstop place him among the all-time MLB leaders in games played (14th, 2097) and double plays (20th, 1186) at that position. Campaneris is the second cousin of former MLB player Jose Cardenal, growing up near each other in Matanzas, Cuba.

== Professional career ==
1970 postcard of Campaneris posing for Oakland Athletics

Campaneris attracted the attention of major league scouts while playing with the Cuba national baseball team at the 1961 Amateur World Series, along with Tito Fuentes and José Miguel Pineda. He was signed by Kansas City Athletics scout Felix Delgado, who agreed to a $1,000 bonus if he remained with the A’s organization for at least 60 days. Campaneris was one of the last players to sign with a major league team before the Cuban Revolution made emigration extremely rare.”

A small player at 5 ft 10 in (1.78 m) and 160 pounds (73 kg), Cuban-born Campaneris was a key figure on the A's of the 1960s and 1970s. In his debut with Kansas City on July 23, 1964, Campaneris hit two home runs, the first coming on the first pitch thrown to him by Jim Kaat of the Minnesota Twins. He is one of only six players in major league history to hit two home runs in his first game; Charlie Reilly (1889), Bob Nieman (1951), Mark Quinn (1999), J. P. Arencibia (2010), and Trevor Story (2016) are the others to accomplish this feat. Just called up that day from Double-A Birmingham, he also singled, walked, and stole a base.

In 1965, Campaneris led Kansas City in batting average (.270), and shared the league lead in triples (twelve, with 1965 AL MVP Zoilo Versailles) and stolen bases (51). His 51 stolen bases were the highest total by an Athletics player since Eddie Collins stole 58 in 1914 (when the team was based in Philadelphia). He also broke Luis Aparicio's nine-year run of the American League stolen base title. In 1966 he finished tenth in the voting for the AL's Most Valuable Player award after having a similar season at the plate but playing more regularly at shortstop. When the Athletics moved to Oakland in 1968, Campaneris led the league in hits (177), steals (62), and at bats (642); the last mark was an Oakland record until Johnny Damon broke it in 2001.

Between June 10 and June 21, 1969, Campaneris set a major league record by stealing a base in twelve consecutive games, a record which still stands as of 2026.

In 1970, Campaneris batted .279 with career highs of 22 home runs and 64 runs batted in while leading the league in steals for the fifth time (42) and scoring 97 runs. He improved consistently on defense; his six double plays in an extra-inning game on September 13 of that year set an AL record. In 1972, he led AL shortstops with 795 total chances while also breaking Collins' franchise record of 376 steals. An avid bunter, he led the league in sacrifice hits in 1972 (twenty), 1977 (forty) and 1978 (25).

In his postseason career of 37 games, he had eleven runs batted in (RBI) with three home runs, four doubles and a triple while also scoring fifteen runs and stealing six bases.

In 1972, Campaneris was second in American League shortstop All-Star voting behind Luis Aparicio. Aparicio could not play and all-star manager, and future hall of famer, Earl Weaver, picked all-star reserve Toby Harrah to start rather than Campaneris who was Aparicio's original all-star reserve. When Harrah was injured, Weaver picked his own Orioles player, Bobby Grich, to not only replace Harrah, but to start over Campaneris. The game went 10 innings and Weaver played Grich the entire game at shortstop, instead of allowing Campaneris a chance to play at all. Campaneris's teammate Reggie Jackson reported Campaneris was extremely angry after the game. Campaneris responded to Weaver's slight by his future stellar play against the Orioles. In the 1973 playoffs against the Orioles, which Oakland won 3-2, he led off game two with a home run, stole two bases and scored two runs. In game three, he hit a game-winning home run in the 11th inning. In five games he had a .308 batting average, 16 hits, 9 runs scored, 6 RBIs, 6 stolen bases and 3 home runs.

In Game 2 of the 1972 American League Championship Series against the Detroit Tigers, Campaneris already had three hits, two steals, and two runs when he faced pitcher Lerrin LaGrow in the seventh inning. After a pitch hit him in the ankle, Campaneris threw his bat at LaGrow. The benches cleared, with Detroit manager Billy Martin going after Campaneris; both Campaneris and LaGrow were ejected. Campaneris was fined $500 and suspended for the rest of the ALCS by American League President Joe Cronin. MLB Commissioner Bowie Kuhn added a seven-day suspension to the start of the next season but permitted Campaneris to play in the World Series victory over the Cincinnati Reds.

In the 1973 American League Championship Series, in which the A's defeated the Baltimore Orioles, he led off Game 2 with a home run, and won Game 3 with a leadoff home run in the eleventh inning. In Game 7 of the 1973 World Series against the New York Mets, both he and Reggie Jackson hit two-run home runs in the third inning off Jon Matlack—the only two home runs Oakland hit the entire series. The A's took a 4–0 lead and went on to win to repeat as world champions; Campaneris caught Wayne Garrett's pop-up for the final out of the Series. In 1974, he broke Jimmy Dykes's franchise mark for career at bats (6,023), and in 1976, he broke Dykes's mark for games played (1,702), as well as Al Simmons's Athletics record of 1,827 career hits.

After the 1976 season, he signed with the Texas Rangers, but he saw his playing time reduced in 1978. In May 1979, he was traded to the California Angels, splitting time at shortstop over the next two seasons with Jim Anderson and Freddie Patek before playing as a reserve third baseman in 1981.

After spending 1982 in the Mexican League, Campaneris returned to the majors in 1983 with Billy Martin's New York Yankees, where he batted a career-high .322 in sixty games at second and third base before retiring.

In his 19-year career, Campaneris batted .259 with 79 home runs, 646 RBIs, 1,181 runs, 2,249 hits, 313 doubles, and 86 triples in 2,328 games. His 649 stolen bases place him fourteenth in major league history, behind only Ty Cobb and Eddie Collins in the AL. His Athletics record of 566 steals was broken by Rickey Henderson in 1990. Henderson also surpassed his Oakland records for career triples, if limited to Oakland and excluding Campaneris's triples for the Kansas City Athletics from 1964-1967. Neither Campaneris or Henderson is in the top 10 of all time Athletics triples leaders, where Danny Murphy leads with 102.

Campaneris still retains the Athletics franchise records for career games (1,702), at bats (7,180 at bats), putouts (2,932), assists (5,021) and double plays (934) at shortstop. Henderson walked over 700 more times than Campaneris (1,227 to 504), but Campaneris had over 1,000 more at bats (7,180 to 6,140), more sacrifice hits (156-59), and both were hit by pitches 55 times; giving Campaneris the most plate appearances for the Athletics.

=== Playing all nine positions ===
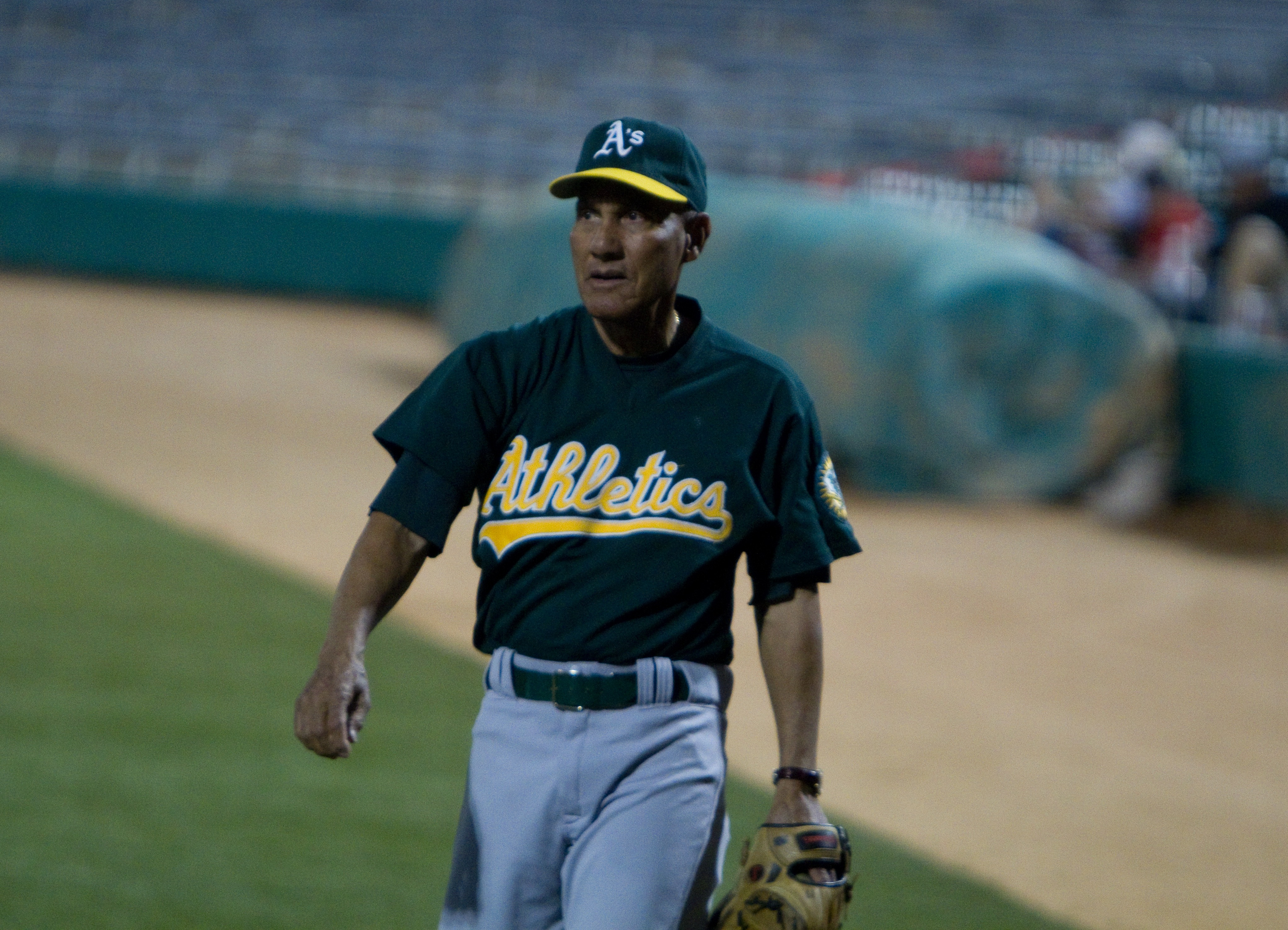
Campaneris playing in a charity baseball game, 2010

In 1965, Campaneris became the first player to play every position in a major league game in a thirteen-inning 5–3 loss to the California Angels at Municipal Stadium on September 8. It was an attempt by owner Charlie Finley to sell more tickets, which succeeded as the attendance that Wednesday night was 21,576. Playing a different position in each of the first nine innings, Campaneris started at shortstop, then shifted to second base, third base, left field, center field, right field, first base, pitcher, and catcher. On the mound, he pitched ambidextrously, throwing lefty to left-handers, and switched against right-handers. His night ended when he sustained a minor left shoulder injury while tagging out Ed Kirkpatrick in a collision at home plate to end the top of the ninth.

Since then, César Tovar (Twins, 1968), Scott Sheldon (Rangers, 2000), Shane Halter (Tigers, 2000), and Andrew Romine (Tigers, 2017) have joined this select list of nine-position players in a major league game. On March 12, 2015, actor Will Ferrell played in five Major League Baseball Spring training games at all nine positions to honor Campaneris.

== Post-baseball career ==
Following his retirement, Campaneris wanted to coach in the Major Leagues, but no one gave him a chance. He then landed a few minor league opportunities, until the Seibu Lions offered him a job to coach defense and base running with them in 1987. The Lions won the Japan Series in both 1987 and 1988. Afterwards, Campaneris played for the Gold Coast Suns of the Senior Professional Baseball Association in its inaugural season of 1989. As the oldest everyday player in the league at 47, he hit .291 and stole 16 bases in 60 games.

Campaneris currently lives in Scottsdale, Arizona, and often participates in Old-Timers' games around the country. He also conducts baseball camps and is an active participant in the Major League Baseball Players Alumni Association, often playing in charity golf tournaments.

== See also ==
- List of Major League Baseball annual triples leaders
- List of Major League Baseball career assists as a shortstop leaders
- List of Major League Baseball career assists leaders
- List of Major League Baseball career fielding errors as a shortstop leaders
- List of Major League Baseball career games played as a shortstop leaders
- List of Major League Baseball career hits leaders
- List of Major League Baseball career putouts as a shortstop leaders
- List of Major League Baseball career runs scored leaders
- List of Major League Baseball career stolen bases leaders
- List of Major League Baseball players from Cuba
- List of Major League Baseball players with a home run in their first major league at bat
- List of Major League Baseball stolen base records
- List of Oakland Athletics team records
- Major League Baseball titles leaders
- Oakland Athletics award winners and league leaders
