= Dick Green =

American baseball player (born 1941)

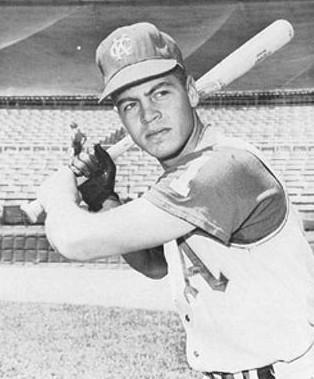
- Second baseman
- Born: April 21, 1941 (age 85); Sioux City, Iowa, U.S.
- Batted: Right Threw: Right

MLB debut
- September 9, 1963, for the Kansas City Athletics

Last MLB appearance
- October 2, 1974, for the Oakland Athletics

MLB statistics
- Batting average: .240
- Home runs: 80
- Runs batted in: 422
- Stats at Baseball Reference

Teams
- Kansas City / Oakland Athletics (1963–1974)

Career highlights and awards
- 3× World Series champion (1972–1974)

Richard Larry Green (born April 21, 1941) is an American former professional baseball player. He played as a second baseman in Major League Baseball from 1963 through 1974, playing for the Kansas City and Oakland Athletics. Green played on the "Swingin' A's" dynasty that won three consecutive World Series championships between 1972 and 1974.

== Early years ==
Born in Sioux City, Iowa, Green was raised in Yankton and Mitchell, South Dakota, where his ability as a baseball player was first noted.

== Professional career ==
An outstanding high school quarterback, Green was offered a scholarship by Michigan State University, but did not attend college, and was signed by the Kansas City Athletics before the 1960 season as an amateur free agent. Green spent a few seasons in the minor leagues before being called up on September 9, 1963. Green played minimally in 13 games, but did pick up 10 hits, including his first major league home run.

In 1964, his first full year in the majors, Green played 130 games, with 115 hits, 11 of them being home runs and posted a .264 batting average. He also committed just six errors at second base and finished the season with a .990 fielding percentage. The following season, Green finished with a batting average of .232 and 110 hits in 133 games.

In 1966, Green improved, hitting .250, slapping in 127 hits in 140 games, and also knocked in 62 runs. However, Green struggled the following season. With 69 hits in 122 games, Green coupled his .198 batting average with 5 home runs and 37 RBIs.

After the season, the Kansas City Athletics franchise moved to Oakland. Green posted better numbers the following two seasons with the Oakland Athletics and had a career year in 1969 when he finished the season with a .275 average, 12 home runs, 64 RBIs, and 61 runs scored.

Green was a member of the 1972–1974 World Series championship teams, and won the Babe Ruth Award for his performance in 1974. He won the award for his fielding, despite not getting a single hit during the World Series, going 0-for-13. Green tied a World Series record in game three by starting three double plays in one game. He started the first two by catching line drives, and the third was a ground ball double play to end the game. In game four, Green also started a game-ending double play. In the eighth inning of the clinching game five, Green made a perfect relay throw to get Bill Buckner, representing the tying run, out at third base. The six double plays Green participated in during the 1974 World Series tied the record for most defensive double plays in a five-game series.

Before the 1975 season, Green was released by the A's but decided to retire to run the family moving business, thus ending his 12-year career in the majors. He finished his career with a .240 lifetime batting average, 960 hits, 80 home runs, 422 RBIs and 427 runs scored.

On September 19, 2009, another rare South Dakota Major Leaguer--Mark Ellis passed Green for the franchise record for homers by a second baseman with his 77th home run playing second base for the A's.

In 2018, he was named to the Oakland Athletics' 50th anniversary All-Time Team.

== See also ==
- List of Major League Baseball players who spent their entire career with one franchise
