= 1974 Cleveland Indians season =

1974 Cleveland Indians
- League: American League
- Division: East
- Ballpark: Cleveland Municipal Stadium
- City: Cleveland, Ohio
- Owners: Nick Mileti
- General managers: Phil Seghi
- Managers: Ken Aspromonte
- Television: WJW-TV
- Radio: WWWE (1100)

The 1974 Cleveland Indians season was the team's 74th season in Major League Baseball. It involved the Indians competing in the American League East, where they finished fourth with a record of 77–85.

== Offseason ==
- December 12, 1973: Roger Freed was traded by the Indians to the Cincinnati Reds for Steve Blateric.
- March 19, 1974: Walt Williams and Rick Sawyer were traded by the Indians to the New York Yankees as part of a 3-team trade. The Detroit Tigers sent Jim Perry to the Indians. The Yankees sent Jerry Moses to the Tigers. The Tigers sent Ed Farmer to the Yankees.
- March 28, 1974: Mike Kekich was released by the Cleveland Indians.

== Regular season ==
During the season, Gaylord Perry became the last pitcher to win at least 20 games in one season for the Indians in the 20th century.

Dick Bosman pitched a no-walk no-hitter against Oakland on July 19, winning 4–0. Only a throwing error by Bosman himself kept it from being a perfect game.

=== Ten Cent Beer Night ===
Ten Cent Beer Night was an ill-fated promotion held by the American League's Cleveland Indians during a game against the Texas Rangers at Cleveland Municipal Stadium on June 4, 1974.

The idea behind the promotion was to offer as many eight-ounce (237 mL) cups of Stroh's beer as the fans could drink for just 10¢ apiece, thus increasing ticket sales. However, the stunt also had the effect of slowly turning the calm and orderly baseball fans into a rowdy and raucous crowd devoid of inhibition.

The game had a special significance for both clubs, as there had been a bench-clearing brawl in a Rangers/Indians game one week earlier at Arlington Stadium in Texas, during a "cheap beer night" there. In Texas, the trouble had started in the bottom of the fourth inning with a walk to the Rangers' Tom Grieve, followed by a Lenny Randle single.

The next batter hit a double play ball to Indians third baseman John Lowenstein; he stepped on the third base bag to retire Grieve and threw the ball to second base, but Randle disrupted the play with a hard slide into second baseman Jack Brohamer. The Indians retaliated in the bottom of the eighth when pitcher Milt Wilcox threw behind Randle's head. Randle eventually laid down a bunt. When Wilcox attempted to field it and tag Randle out, Randle hit him with a forearm.

Indians first baseman John Ellis responded by punching Randle, and both benches emptied for a brawl. During the melee, the intoxicated crowd became rowdy and threw beer on the Indians' players.

Six days later, the Ten Cent Beer Night promotion induced over 25,000 fans to come to Municipal Stadium for the Rangers/Indians game. Early in the game, the Rangers took a 5–1 lead. Meanwhile, throughout the contest, the crowd in attendance continually misbehaved. A woman ran out to the Indians' on-deck circle and lifted her shirt and a naked man sprinted to second base as Grieve hit his second home run of the game. A father and son pair ran onto the outfield and mooned the fans in the bleachers one inning later.

The ugliness escalated when Cleveland's Leron Lee hit a line drive into the stomach of Rangers pitcher Ferguson Jenkins, after which Jenkins dropped to the ground. The fans in the upper deck of Municipal Stadium cheered, then chanted "Hit 'em again! Hit 'em again! Harder! Harder!"

The Rangers later argued a call in which Lee was called safe in a close play at third base, spiking Jenkins with his cleats in the process and forcing him to leave the game. The Rangers angry response to this call enraged Cleveland fans, who again began throwing objects onto the field. In the bottom of the ninth, the Indians managed to rally and tie the game at five runs apiece, but with a crowd that had been consuming as much alcohol as it could for nine innings, the situation finally boiled over.

After Texas outfielder Jeff Burroughs violently reacted to a fan stealing his glove and cap, the Texas players, led by manager Billy Martin, charged onto the field with bats. A huge number of intoxicated fans, some armed with knives, chains, and portions of stadium seats that they had torn apart, surged onto the field; others hurled bottles from the stands. Realizing the Rangers might be in danger of their lives, Ken Aspromonte, the Indians' manager, ordered his players to grab bats and help the Rangers.

As a result, umpire crew chief Nestor Chylak, realizing that order would not be restored in a timely fashion, forfeited the game to Texas. He too was a victim of the rioters as one struck him with part of a stadium seat, cutting his head. His hand was also cut by a thrown rock.

As Joe Tait and Herb Score called the riot live on radio, Score mentioned the lack of police protection; a riot squad from the Cleveland police department finally arrived to restore order.

=== Season standings ===
AL East
Team	W	L	Pct.	GB	Home	Road
Baltimore Orioles	91	71	.562	—	46‍–‍35	45‍–‍36
New York Yankees	89	73	.549	2	47‍–‍34	42‍–‍39
Boston Red Sox	84	78	.519	7	46‍–‍35	38‍–‍43
Cleveland Indians	77	85	.475	14	40‍–‍41	37‍–‍44
Milwaukee Brewers	76	86	.469	15	40‍–‍41	36‍–‍45
Detroit Tigers	72	90	.444	19	36‍–‍45	36‍–‍45

=== Record vs. opponents ===
1974 American League record Sources:
Team	BAL	BOS	CAL	CWS	CLE	DET	KC	MIL	MIN	NYY	OAK	TEX
Baltimore	—	10–8	7–5	5–7	12–6	14–4	8–4	8–10	6–6	11–7	6–6	4–8
Boston	8–10	—	4–8	8–4	9–9	11–7	4–8	10–8	6–6	11–7	8–4	5–7
California	5–7	8–4	—	10–8–1	3–9	5–7	8–10	3–9	8–10	3–9	6–12	9–9
Chicago	7–5	4–8	8–10–1	—	8–4	7–5	11–7	8–4	7–11–1	4–8	7–11	9–7–1
Cleveland	6–12	9–9	9–3	4–8	—	9–9	8–4	10–8	6–6	7–11	5–7	4–8
Detroit	4–14	7–11	7–5	5–7	9–9	—	7–5	9–9	3–9	11–7	5–7	5–7
Kansas City	4–8	8–4	10–8	7–11	4–8	5–7	—	11–1	8–10	4–8	8–10	8–10
Milwaukee	10–8	8–10	9–3	4–8	8–10	9–9	1–11	—	6–6	9–9	5–7	7–5
Minnesota	6–6	6–6	10–8	11–7–1	6–6	9–3	10–8	6–6	—	4–8	5–13	9–9
New York	7–11	7–11	9–3	8–4	11–7	7–11	8–4	9–9	8–4	—	7–5	8–4
Oakland	6–6	4–8	12–6	11–7	7–5	7–5	10–8	7–5	13–5	5–7	—	8–10
Texas	8–4	7–5	9–9	7–9–1	8–4	7–5	10–8	5–7	9–9	4–8	10–8	—

=== Notable transactions ===
- April 1, 1974: Rich Hinton was released by the Indians.
- April 26, 1974: Chris Chambliss, Dick Tidrow and Cecil Upshaw were traded by the Indians to the New York Yankees for Fritz Peterson, Steve Kline, Fred Beene, and Tom Buskey.
- June 5, 1974: Joe Lis was purchased by the Indians from the Minnesota Twins.
- August 17, 1974: Rico Carty was purchased by the Indians from the Cafeteros de Córdoba (Mexican League).
- September 12, 1974: Ken Suarez, Rusty Torres, and cash were traded by the Indians to the California Angels for Frank Robinson.

=== Opening Day Lineup ===
Opening Day Starters
#	Name	Position
29	John Lowenstein	LF
23	Oscar Gamble	DH
20	George Hendrick	CF
7	John Ellis	C
24	Charlie Spikes	RF
14	Chris Chambliss	1B
25	Buddy Bell	3B
15	Frank Duffy	SS
4	Remy Hermoso	2B
36	Gaylord Perry	P

=== Roster ===
1974 Cleveland Indians
Roster
Pitchers: 41 Steve Arlin; 47 Fred Beene; 27 Dick Bosman; 35 Tom Buskey; 13 Bruce Ellingsen; 32 Bill Gogolewski; 40 Tom Hilgendorf; 32 Bob Johnson; 34 Jim Kern; 38 Steve Kline; 36 Gaylord Perry; 31 Jim Perry; 16 Fritz Peterson; 47 Ken Sanders; 41 Dick Tidrow; 39 Tom Timmermann; 35 Cecil Upshaw; 43 Milt Wilcox	Catchers: 8 Alan Ashby; 11 Dave Duncan; Infielders: 17 Luis Alvarado; 52 Dwain Anderson; 25 Buddy Bell; 18 Ossie Blanco; 10 Jack Brohamer; 9 Rico Carty; 14 Chris Chambliss; 12 Ed Crosby; 15 Frank Duffy; 7 John Ellis; 17 Jack Heidemann; 4 Remy Hermoso; 18 Duane Kuiper; 30 Joe Lis; 14 Tommy McCraw; 20 Frank Robinson	Outfielders: 23 Oscar Gamble; 20 George Hendrick; 42 Johnny Jeter; 22 Leron Lee; 29 John Lowenstein; 26 Tommy Smith; 24 Charlie Spikes; 28 Rusty Torres; Other batters: 9 Larry Johnson	Manager: 2 Ken Aspromonte; Coaches: 3 Clay Bryant (Pitching); 6 Larry Doby (First Base); 21 Tony Pacheco (Third Base)

== Game log ==
=== Regular season ===
1974 regular season game log: 77–85 (Home: 40–41; Away: 37–44)
April: 10–11 (Home: 7–4; Away: 3–7)

#	Date	Time (ET)	Opponent	Score	Win	Loss	Save	Time of Game	Attendance	Record	Box/ Streak
15	April 23	1:00 p.m. EST	Athletics	2–1	**G. Perry** (2–1)	Hunter (3–1)	—	2:08	1,405	5–10	W1
16	April 24	1:00 p.m. EST	Athletics	2–9	Holtzman (1–1)	**Tidrow** (1–3)	—	2:47	1,564	5–11	L1

May: 12–14 (Home: 4–6; Away: 8–8)

#	Date	Time (ET)	Opponent	Score	Win	Loss	Save	Time of Game	Attendance	Record	Box/ Streak
22	May 3	11:00 p.m. EDT	@ Athletics	1–3	Holtzman (2–3)	**J. Perry** (2–2)	Fingers (2)	1:43	4,460	10–12	L1
23	May 4	4:30 p.m. EDT	@ Athletics	8–2	**G. Perry** (4–1)	Blue (0–4)	—	2:22	4,884	11–12	W1
24	May 5 (1)	4:30 p.m. EDT	@ Athletics	0–3	Hunter (5–2)	**Kline** (3–3)	—	1:49	—	11–13	L1
25	May 5 (2)	6:44 p.m. EDT	@ Athletics	9–3	**Johnson** (1–2)	Odom (0–2)	**Buskey** (2)	2:25	10,100	12–13	W1

June: 16–9 (Home: 9–7; Away: 7–2)

#	Date	Time (ET)	Opponent	Score	Win	Loss	Save	Time of Game	Attendance	Record	Box/ Streak

July: 14–15 (Home: 8–8; Away: 6–7)

#	Date	Time (ET)	Opponent	Score	Win	Loss	Save	Time of Game	Attendance	Record	Box/ Streak
80	July 8	11:00 p.m. EDT	@ Athletics	3–4 (10)	Blue (9–8)	**G. Perry** (15–2)	—	2:34	47,582	45–36	L1
81	July 9	11:00 p.m. EDT	@ Athletics	0–7	Hunter (12–8)	**Arlin** (3–10)	—	2:01	6,655	45–37	L2
89	July 18	7:30 p.m. EDT	Athletics	3–4	Hunter (14–8)	**G. Perry** (15–3)	—	2:19	41,848	46–43	L6
90	July 19	7:30 p.m. EDT	Athletics	4–0	**Bosman** (2–0)	Hamilton (6–3)	—	1:56	24,302	47–43	W1
91	July 20	2:15 p.m. EDT	Athletics	10–9	**Hilgendorf** (2–2)	Fingers (7–3)	—	3:09	19,126	48–43	W2
92	July 21	1:30 p.m. EDT	Athletics	3–6	Blue (11–9)	**J. Perry** (9–8)	Lindblad (5)	2:32	40,368	48–44	L1
ASG	July 23	8:15 p.m. EDT	45th All-Star Game in Pittsburgh, PA	7 – 2 AL	—	—	—	2:37	50,706	—	ASG

August: 13–16 (Home: 6–7; Away: 7–9)

#	Date	Time (ET)	Opponent	Score	Win	Loss	Save	Time of Game	Attendance	Record	Box/ Streak

September: 11–19 (Home: 6–9; Away: 5–10)

#	Date	Time (ET)	Opponent	Score	Win	Loss	Save	Time of Game	Attendance	Record	Box/ Streak

October: 1–1 (Home: 0–0; Away: 1–1)

#	Date	Time (ET)	Opponent	Score	Win	Loss	Save	Time of Game	Attendance	Record	Box/ Streak

Legend: = Win = Loss = Eliminated from playoff race = Postponement
Bold = Indians team member

=== Detailed records ===
**American League**
Opponent	Home	Away	Total	Pct.	Runs scored	Runs allowed
**AL East**
**Cleveland Indians**	—	—	—	—	—	—
**Division Total**	**0–0**	**0–0**	**0–0**	–	**0**	**0**
**AL West**
Oakland Athletics	3–3	2–4	5–7	.417	44	50
**Division Total**	**3–3**	**2–4**	**5–7**	**.417**	**44**	**50**
**Season Total**	**3–3**	**2–4**	**5–7**	**.417**	**44**	**50**

== Player stats ==
=== Batting ===
Note: G = Games played; AB = At bats; R = Runs scored; H = Hits; 2B = Doubles; 3B = Triples; HR = Home runs; RBI = Runs batted in; AVG = Batting average; SB = Stolen bases

Player	G	AB	R	H	2B	3B	HR	RBI	AVG	SB
Luis Alvarado	61	114	12	25	2	0	0	12	.219	1
Dwain Anderson	2	3	0	1	0	0	0	0	.333	0
Alan Ashby	10	7	1	1	0	0	0	0	.143	0
Buddy Bell	116	423	51	111	15	1	7	46	.262	3
Ossie Blanco	18	36	1	7	0	0	0	2	.194	0
Jack Brohamer	101	315	33	85	11	1	2	30	.270	2
Rico Carty	33	91	6	33	5	0	1	16	.363	0
Chris Chambliss	17	67	8	22	4	0	0	7	.328	0
Ed Crosby	37	86	11	18	3	0	0	6	.209	0
Frank Duffy	158	549	62	128	18	0	8	48	.233	7
Dave Duncan	136	425	45	85	10	1	16	46	.200	0
John Ellis	128	477	58	136	23	6	10	64	.285	1
Oscar Gamble	135	454	74	132	16	4	19	59	.291	5
Jack Heidemann	12	11	2	1	0	0	0	0	.091	0
George Hendrick	139	495	65	138	23	1	19	67	.279	6
Remy Hermoso	48	122	15	27	3	1	0	5	.221	2
Johnny Jeter	6	17	3	6	1	0	0	1	.353	1
Duane Kuiper	10	22	7	11	2	0	0	4	.500	1
Leron Lee	79	232	18	54	13	0	5	25	.233	3
Joe Lis	57	109	15	22	3	0	6	16	.202	1
John Lowenstein	140	508	65	123	14	2	8	48	.242	36
Tommy McCraw	45	112	17	34	8	0	3	17	.304	0
Frank Robinson	15	50	6	10	1	1	2	5	.200	0
Tommy Smith	25	31	4	3	1	0	0	0	.097	0
Charlie Spikes	155	568	63	154	23	1	22	80	.271	10
Rusty Torres	109	150	19	28	2	0	3	12	.187	2
Team totals	162	5474	662	1395	201	19	131	616	.255	79

=== Pitching ===
Note: W = Wins; L = Losses; ERA = Earned run average; G = Games pitched; GS = Games started; SV = Saves; IP = Innings pitched; H = Hits allowed; R = Runs allowed; ER = Earned runs allowed; BB = Walks allowed

Player	W	L	ERA	G	GS	SV	IP	H	R	ER	BB	K
Steve Arlin	2	5	6.60	11	10	0	43.2	59	34	33	22	20
Fred Beene	4	4	4.93	32	0	2	73.0	68	44	40	26	35
Dick Bosman	7	5	4.10	25	18	0	127.1	126	69	58	29	56
Tom Buskey	2	6	3.19	51	0	17	93.0	93	36	33	33	40
Bruce Ellingsen	1	1	3.21	16	2	0	42.0	45	21	15	17	16
Bill Gogolewski	0	0	4.61	5	0	0	13.2	15	7	7	2	3
Tom Hilgendorf	4	3	4.84	35	0	3	48.1	58	26	26	17	23
Bob Johnson	3	4	4.38	14	10	0	72.0	75	42	35	37	36
Jim Kern	0	1	4.70	4	3	0	15.1	16	9	8	14	11
Steve Kline	3	8	5.07	16	11	0	71.0	70	44	40	31	17
Gaylord Perry	21	13	2.51	37	37	0	322.1	230	98	90	99	216
Jim Perry	17	12	2.96	36	36	0	252.0	242	94	83	64	71
Fritz Peterson	9	14	4.36	29	29	0	152.2	187	89	74	37	52
Ken Sanders	0	1	9.82	9	0	1	11.0	21	12	12	5	4
Dick Tidrow	1	3	7.11	4	4	0	19.0	21	17	15	13	8
Tom Timmermann	1	1	5.40	4	0	0	10.0	9	6	6	5	2
Cecil Upshaw	0	1	3.38	7	0	0	8.0	10	4	3	4	7
Milt Wilcox	2	2	4.67	41	2	4	71.1	74	42	37	24	33
Team totals	77	85	3.80	162	162	27	1445.2	1419	694	611	479	650

== Awards and honors ==
=== All-Stars ===
All-Star Game

- George Hendrick, reserve
- Gaylord Perry, pitcher, starter

== Farm system ==
Level	Team	League	Manager
AAA	Oklahoma City 89ers	American Association	Red Davis
AA	San Antonio Brewers	Texas League	Woody Smith
A	Reno Silver Sox	California League	Joe Azcue and Del Youngblood
Rookie	GCL Indians	Gulf Coast League	Wilfredo Calviño
