= 1973 Cleveland Indians season =

1973 Cleveland Indians
- League: American League
- Division: East
- Ballpark: Cleveland Municipal Stadium
- City: Cleveland, Ohio
- Owners: Nick Mileti
- General managers: Gabe Paul, Phil Seghi
- Managers: Ken Aspromonte
- Television: WJW-TV
- Radio: WERE (1300)

The 1973 Cleveland Indians season was the 73rd in the franchise's history. The club finished in sixth place in the American League East.

== Offseason ==
In January, Vernon Stouffer sold the Cleveland Indians to Nick Mileti for $10 million. It was $1.4 million more than the group led by George Steinbrenner had offered in December 1971.

=== Notable transactions ===
- October 19, 1972: Eddie Leon was traded by the Indians to the Chicago White Sox for Walt Williams.
- November 27, 1972: Graig Nettles and Jerry Moses were traded by the Indians to the New York Yankees for John Ellis, Jerry Kenney, Charlie Spikes, and Rusty Torres.
- November 30, 1972: Del Unser and Terry Wedgewood (minors) were traded by the Indians to the Philadelphia Phillies for Oscar Gamble and Roger Freed.
- November 30, 1972: Tom Ragland was traded by the Texas Rangers to the Cleveland Indians for Vince Colbert.
- March 8, 1973: Alex Johnson was traded by the Indians to the Texas Rangers for Rich Hinton and Vince Colbert.
- March 24, 1973: Ray Fosse and Jack Heidemann were traded by the Indians to the Oakland Athletics for Dave Duncan and George Hendrick.

== Regular season ==
- John Adams started to drum at Cleveland Stadium on August 24, 1973, when the Indians played the Texas Rangers. Cleveland won, 11–5. Ever since, Adams has sat in the highest bleacher seat in left center field with his bass drum until 2019.

=== Season standings ===
AL East
Team	W	L	Pct.	GB	Home	Road
Baltimore Orioles	97	65	.599	—	50‍–‍31	47‍–‍34
Boston Red Sox	89	73	.549	8	48‍–‍33	41‍–‍40
Detroit Tigers	85	77	.525	12	47‍–‍34	38‍–‍43
New York Yankees	80	82	.494	17	50‍–‍31	30‍–‍51
Milwaukee Brewers	74	88	.457	23	40‍–‍41	34‍–‍47
Cleveland Indians	71	91	.438	26	34‍–‍47	37‍–‍44

=== Record vs. opponents ===
1973 American League record Sources:
Team	BAL	BOS	CAL	CWS	CLE	DET	KC	MIL	MIN	NYY	OAK	TEX
Baltimore	—	7–11	6–6	8–4	12–6	9–9	8–4	15–3	8–4	9–9	5–7	10–2
Boston	11–7	—	7–5	6–6	9–9	3–15	8–4	12–6	6–6	14–4	4–8	9–3
California	6–6	5–7	—	8–10	5–7	7–5	10–8	5–7	10–8	6–6	6–12	11–7
Chicago	4–8	6–6	10–8	—	7–5	5–7	6–12	3–9	9–9	8–4	6–12	13–5
Cleveland	6–12	9–9	7–5	5–7	—	9–9	2–10	9–9	7–5	7–11	3–9	7–5
Detroit	9–9	15–3	5–7	7–5	9–9	—	4–8	12–6	5–7	7–11	7–5	5–7
Kansas City	4–8	4–8	8–10	12–6	10–2	8–4	—	8–4	9–9	6–6	8–10	11–7
Milwaukee	3–15	6–12	7–5	9–3	9–9	6–12	4–8	—	8–4	10–8	4–8	8–4
Minnesota	4–8	6–6	8–10	9–9	5–7	7–5	9–9	4–8	—	3–9	14–4	12–6
New York	9–9	4–14	6–6	4–8	11–7	11–7	6–6	8–10	9–3	—	4–8	8–4
Oakland	7–5	8–4	12–6	12–6	9–3	5–7	10–8	8–4	4–14	8–4	—	11–7
Texas	2–10	3–9	7–11	5–13	5–7	7–5	7–11	4–8	6–12	4–8	7–11	—

=== Notable transactions ===
- May 4, 1973: Jerry Kenney was released by the Indians.
- June 12, 1973: Lowell Palmer was traded by the Indians to the New York Yankees for Mike Kekich.

=== Opening Day Lineup ===
Opening Day Starters
#	Name	Position
28	Rusty Torres	RF
20	George Hendrick	CF
14	Chris Chambliss	1B
7	John Ellis	DH
24	Charlie Spikes	LF
11	Dave Duncan	C
25	Buddy Bell	3B
10	Jack Brohamer	2B
4	Leo Cárdenas	SS
36	Gaylord Perry	P

=== Roster ===
1973 Cleveland Indians
Roster
Pitchers: 49,27 Dick Bosman; 46 Steve Dunning; 47 Ed Farmer; 40 Tom Hilgendorf; 46 Mike Jackson; 32 Jerry Johnson; 18 Mike Kekich; 42 Mike Kilkenny; 30 Ray Lamb; 31 Steve Mingori; 36 Gaylord Perry; 47 Ken Sanders; 34 Brent Strom; 41 Dick Tidrow; 31 Tom Timmermann; 43 Milt Wilcox	Catchers: 8 Alan Ashby; 11 Dave Duncan; 7 John Ellis; Infielders: 25 Buddy Bell; 10 Jack Brohamer; 4 Leo Cárdenas; 14 Chris Chambliss; 15 Frank Duffy; 9 Jerry Kenney; 16 Tom Ragland	Outfielders: 33 Ted Ford; 23 Oscar Gamble; 20 George Hendrick; 23 Ron Lolich; 29 John Lowenstein; 26 Tommy Smith; 24 Charlie Spikes; 28 Rusty Torres; 13 Walt Williams	Manager: 2 Ken Aspromonte; Coaches: 6 Rocky Colavito (First Base); 3 Joe Lutz (Third Base); 21 Warren Spahn (Pitching)

== Player stats ==
=== Batting ===
Note: G = Games played; AB = At bats; R = Runs scored; H = Hits; 2B = Doubles; 3B = Triples; HR = Home runs; RBI = Runs batted in; AVG = Batting average; SB = Stolen bases

Player	G	AB	R	H	2B	3B	HR	RBI	AVG	SB
Alan Ashby	11	29	4	5	1	0	1	3	.172	0
Buddy Bell	156	631	86	169	23	7	14	59	.268	7
Jack Brohamer	102	300	29	66	12	1	4	29	.220	0
Leo Cardenas	72	195	9	42	4	0	0	12	.215	1
Chris Chambliss	155	572	70	156	30	2	11	53	.273	4
Frank Duffy	116	361	34	95	16	4	8	50	.263	6
Dave Duncan	95	344	43	80	11	1	17	43	.233	3
John Ellis	127	437	59	118	12	2	14	68	.270	0
Ted Ford	11	40	3	9	0	1	0	3	.225	1
Oscar Gamble	113	390	56	104	11	3	20	44	.267	3
George Hendrick	113	440	64	118	18	0	21	61	.268	7
Jerry Kenney	5	16	0	4	0	1	0	2	.250	0
Ron Lolich	61	140	16	32	7	0	2	15	.229	0
John Lowenstein	98	305	42	89	16	1	6	40	.292	5
Tom Ragland	67	183	16	47	7	1	0	12	.257	2
Tommy Smith	14	41	6	10	2	0	2	3	.244	1
Charlie Spikes	140	506	68	120	12	3	23	73	.237	5
Rusty Torres	122	312	31	64	8	1	7	28	.205	6
Walt Williams	104	350	43	101	15	1	8	38	.289	9
Team totals	162	5592	680	1429	205	29	158	636	.256	60

=== Pitching ===
Note: W = Wins; L = Losses; ERA = Earned run average; G = Games pitched; GS = Games started; SV = Saves; IP = Innings pitched; H = Hits allowed; R = Runs allowed; ER = Earned runs allowed; BB = Walks allowed; K = Strikeouts

Player	W	L	ERA	G	GS	SV	IP	H	R	ER	BB	K
Dick Bosman	1	8	6.22	22	17	0	97.0	130	74	67	29	41
Steve Dunning	0	2	6.50	4	3	0	18.0	17	15	13	13	10
Ed Farmer	0	2	4.67	16	0	1	17.1	25	12	9	5	10
Tom Hilgendorf	5	3	3.14	48	1	6	94.2	87	38	33	36	58
Mike Jackson	0	0	0.00	1	0	0	0.2	1	0	0	0	1
Jerry Johnson	5	6	6.18	39	1	5	59.2	70	48	41	39	45
Mike Kekich	1	4	7.02	16	6	0	50.0	73	47	39	35	26
Mike Kilkenny	0	0	22.50	5	0	0	2.0	5	5	5	5	3
Ray Lamb	3	3	4.60	32	1	2	86.0	98	44	44	42	60
Steve Mingori	0	0	6.17	5	0	0	11.2	10	8	8	10	4
Gaylord Perry	19	19	3.38	41	41	0	344.0	315	143	129	115	238
Ken Sanders	5	1	1.65	15	0	5	27.1	18	6	5	9	14
Brent Strom	2	10	4.61	27	18	0	123.0	134	73	63	47	91
Dick Tidrow	14	16	4.42	42	40	0	274.2	289	150	135	95	138
Tom Timmermann	8	7	4.92	29	15	2	124.1	117	73	68	54	62
Milt Wilcox	8	10	5.83	26	19	0	134.1	143	90	87	68	82
Team totals	71	91	4.58	162	162	21	1464.2	1532	826	746	602	883

== Awards and honors ==
All-Star Game

== Farm system ==
Level	Team	League	Manager
AAA	Oklahoma City 89ers	American Association	Frank Lucchesi
AA	San Antonio Brewers	Texas League	Tony Pacheco
A	Reno Silver Sox	California League	Lou Klimchock
Rookie	GCL Indians	Gulf Coast League	Len Johnston
