= 1973 New York Yankees season =

Season for the Major League Baseball team the New York Yankees

1973 New York Yankees
- League: American League
- Division: East
- Ballpark: Yankee Stadium
- City: New York City
- Record: 80-82 (.494)
- Owners: George Steinbrenner
- General managers: Lee MacPhail
- Managers: Ralph Houk
- Television: WPIX (Phil Rizzuto, Frank Messer, Bill White)
- Radio: WMCA (Frank Messer, Phil Rizzuto, Bill White)

The 1973 New York Yankees season was the 71st season for the team. The Yankees finished fourth in the American League East with a record of 80–82 under manager Ralph Houk, 17 games behind the division champion Baltimore Orioles. This was the last time that the Yankees finished the season below .500 until 1982. This was also their last year in the "old" Yankee Stadium (on the south side of 161st Street), which was targeted for major reconstruction in 1974–1975. During this period, the Yankees shared a home field with a National League team for the third time in their history, moving into Shea Stadium for two years.

== George Steinbrenner ==
The Yankees had been struggling during their years under CBS ownership, which had acquired the team after the 1964 season. In 1972, CBS Chairman William S. Paley told team president E. Michael Burke the media company intended to sell the club. As Burke later told writer Roger Kahn, Paley offered to sell the franchise to Burke if he could find financial backing. Burke ran across Steinbrenner's name and veteran baseball executive Gabe Paul, a Cleveland-area acquaintance of Steinbrenner, helped bring the two men together.

On January 3, 1973, a group of investors led by George Steinbrenner and minority partner Burke bought the Yankees from CBS for $10 million, significantly less than what CBS paid eight years earlier.

The announced intention was that Burke would continue to run the team as club president. But Burke later became angry when he found out that Paul had been brought in as a senior Yankee executive, crowding his authority, and quit the team presidency on April 29, 1973. (Burke remained a minority owner of the club into the following decade.) He handed in his resignation to the Yankees so that he could become president of Madison Square Garden.

It was the first of many high-profile departures by employees who crossed paths with "The Boss". At the conclusion of the 1973 season, two more prominent names departed: manager Ralph Houk resigned to manage the Detroit Tigers and general manager Lee MacPhail became president of the American League.

== Offseason ==
- November 24, 1972: Rob Gardner and a player to be named later were traded by the Yankees to the Oakland Athletics for Matty Alou. The Yankees completed the deal by sending Rich McKinney to the Athletics on December 1.
- November 27, 1972: John Ellis, Jerry Kenney, Charlie Spikes, and Rusty Torres were traded by the Yankees to the Cleveland Indians for Graig Nettles and Jerry Moses.
- Bobby Murcer signed a $100,000 contract with the Yankees. He was just the second player in Yankees history (behind Mickey Mantle) to earn a base salary of $100,000 in one season.

== Regular season ==
After the last game of the 1973 season on September 30, fans ripped out parts of the stadium, including the seats, to take as souvenirs. The stadium was remodeled and reopened in 1976. On July 1, the Yankees were 45–33 (.577) and leading the American League East by four games, but posted a 35–49 (.417) record in their remaining games.

=== Season standings ===
AL East
Team	W	L	Pct.	GB	Home	Road
Baltimore Orioles	97	65	.599	—	50‍–‍31	47‍–‍34
Boston Red Sox	89	73	.549	8	48‍–‍33	41‍–‍40
Detroit Tigers	85	77	.525	12	47‍–‍34	38‍–‍43
New York Yankees	80	82	.494	17	50‍–‍31	30‍–‍51
Milwaukee Brewers	74	88	.457	23	40‍–‍41	34‍–‍47
Cleveland Indians	71	91	.438	26	34‍–‍47	37‍–‍44

=== Record vs. opponents ===
1973 American League record Sources:
Team	BAL	BOS	CAL	CWS	CLE	DET	KC	MIL	MIN	NYY	OAK	TEX
Baltimore	—	7–11	6–6	8–4	12–6	9–9	8–4	15–3	8–4	9–9	5–7	10–2
Boston	11–7	—	7–5	6–6	9–9	3–15	8–4	12–6	6–6	14–4	4–8	9–3
California	6–6	5–7	—	8–10	5–7	7–5	10–8	5–7	10–8	6–6	6–12	11–7
Chicago	4–8	6–6	10–8	—	7–5	5–7	6–12	3–9	9–9	8–4	6–12	13–5
Cleveland	6–12	9–9	7–5	5–7	—	9–9	2–10	9–9	7–5	7–11	3–9	7–5
Detroit	9–9	15–3	5–7	7–5	9–9	—	4–8	12–6	5–7	7–11	7–5	5–7
Kansas City	4–8	4–8	8–10	12–6	10–2	8–4	—	8–4	9–9	6–6	8–10	11–7
Milwaukee	3–15	6–12	7–5	9–3	9–9	6–12	4–8	—	8–4	10–8	4–8	8–4
Minnesota	4–8	6–6	8–10	9–9	5–7	7–5	9–9	4–8	—	3–9	14–4	12–6
New York	9–9	4–14	6–6	4–8	11–7	11–7	6–6	8–10	9–3	—	4–8	8–4
Oakland	7–5	8–4	12–6	12–6	9–3	5–7	10–8	8–4	4–14	8–4	—	11–7
Texas	2–10	3–9	7–11	5–13	5–7	7–5	7–11	4–8	6–12	4–8	7–11	—

=== Notable transactions ===
- April 5, 1973: Frank Baker was traded by the Yankees to the Baltimore Orioles for Tom Matchick.
- June 5, 1973: Kerry Dineen was drafted by the Yankees in the 4th round of the 1973 Major League Baseball draft.
- June 7, 1973: Frank Tepedino, Wayne Nordhagen and players to be named later were traded by the Yankees to the Atlanta Braves for Pat Dobson. The Yankees completed the deal by sending Dave Cheadle to the Braves on August 15 and Al Closter to the Braves on September 5.
- June 7, 1973: Sam McDowell was purchased by the Yankees from the San Francisco Giants.
- June 12, 1973: Mike Kekich was traded by the Yankees to the Cleveland Indians for Lowell Palmer.
- July 30, 1973: Jerry Kenney was signed as a free agent by the Yankees.
- August 7, 1973: The Yankees sent a player to be named later and cash to the St. Louis Cardinals for Wayne Granger. The Yankees completed the deal by sending Ken Crosby to the Cardinals on September 12.
- August 13, 1973: Bernie Allen was purchased from the Yankees by the Montreal Expos.
- August 18, 1973: Johnny Callison was released by the Yankees.

=== Roster ===
1973 New York Yankees
Roster
Pitchers: 47 Fred Beene; 29 Tom Buskey; 29 Casey Cox; 36 Pat Dobson; 39 Wayne Granger; 18 Mike Kekich; 38 Steve Kline; 28 Sparky Lyle; 39 Jim Magnuson; 40 Lindy McDaniel; 29,48 Sam McDowell; 42 Doc Medich; 18,50 Dave Pagan; 19 Fritz Peterson; 30 Mel Stottlemyre	Catchers: 46 Rick Dempsey; 23 Jerry Moses; 15 Thurman Munson; 41 Duke Sims; Infielders: 11 Bernie Allen; 24 Felipe Alou; 12 Ron Blomberg; 20 Horace Clarke; 18 Mike Hegan; 22 Hal Lanier; 17 Gene Michael; 9 Graig Nettles; 10 Celerino Sánchez; 11 Fred Stanley	Outfielders: 2 Matty Alou; 25 Johnny Callison; 1 Bobby Murcer; 14 Ron Swoboda; 24,53 Otto Vélez; 6 Roy White; Other batters: 43 Jim Ray Hart	Manager: 35 Ralph Houk; Coaches: 44 Jim Hegan; 32 Elston Howard; 34 Dick Howser; 31 Jim Turner

== Player stats ==
=== Batting ===
==== Starters by position ====
Note: Pos = Position; G = Games played; AB = At bats; H = Hits; Avg. = Batting average; HR = Home runs; RBI = Runs batted in

Pos	Player	G	AB	H	Avg.	HR	RBI
C	Thurman Munson	147	519	156	.301	20	74
1B	Felipe Alou	93	280	66	.236	4	27
2B	Horace Clarke	148	590	155	.263	2	35
3B	Graig Nettles	160	552	129	.234	22	81
SS	Gene Michael	129	418	94	.225	3	47
LF	Roy White	162	639	157	.246	18	60
CF	Bobby Murcer	160	616	187	.304	22	95
RF	Matty Alou	123	497	147	.296	2	28
DH	Jim Ray Hart	114	339	86	.254	13	52

==== Other batters ====
Note: G = Games played; AB = At bats; H = Hits; Avg. = Batting average; HR = Home runs; RBI = Runs batted in

Player	G	AB	H	Avg.	HR	RBI
Ron Blomberg	100	301	99	.329	12	57
Johnny Callison	45	136	24	.176	1	10
Mike Hegan	37	131	36	.275	6	14
Hal Lanier	35	86	18	.209	0	5
Otto Vélez	23	77	15	.195	2	7
Fred Stanley	26	66	14	.212	1	5
Celerino Sánchez	34	64	14	.219	1	9
Jerry Moses	21	59	15	.254	0	3
Bernie Allen	17	57	13	.228	0	4
Ron Swoboda	35	43	5	.116	1	2
Rick Dempsey	6	11	2	.182	0	0
Duke Sims	4	9	3	.333	1	1

=== Pitching ===
==== Starting pitchers ====
Note: G = Games pitched; IP = Innings pitched; W = Wins; L = Losses; ERA = Earned run average; SO = Strikeouts

Player	G	IP	W	L	ERA	SO
Mel Stottlemyre	38	273.0	16	16	3.07	95
Doc Medich	34	235.0	14	9	2.95	145
Fritz Peterson	31	184.1	8	15	3.95	59
Pat Dobson	22	142.1	9	8	4.17	70
Sam McDowell	16	95.2	5	8	3.95	75
Steve Kline	14	74.0	4	7	4.01	19

==== Other pitchers ====
Note: G = Games pitched; IP = Innings pitched; W = Wins; L = Losses; ERA = Earned run average; SO = Strikeouts

Player	G	IP	W	L	ERA	SO
Fred Beene	19	91.0	6	0	1.68	49
Mike Kekich	5	14.2	1	1	9.20	4
Dave Pagan	4	12.2	0	0	2.84	9

==== Relief pitchers ====
Note: G = Games pitched; W = Wins; L = Losses; SV = Saves; ERA = Earned run average; SO = Strikeouts

Player	G	W	L	SV	ERA	SO
Sparky Lyle	51	5	9	27	2.51	63
Lindy McDaniel	47	12	6	10	2.86	93
Jim Magnuson	8	0	1	0	4.28	9
Tom Buskey	8	0	1	1	5.40	8
Wayne Granger	7	0	1	0	1.76	10
Casey Cox	1	0	0	0	6.00	0

== Farm system ==
Level	Team	League	Manager
AAA	Syracuse Chiefs	International League	Bobby Cox
AA	West Haven Yankees	Eastern League	Doc Edwards
A	Kinston Eagles	Carolina League	Gene Hassell
A	Fort Lauderdale Yankees	Florida State League	Pete Ward
A-Short Season	Oneonta Yankees	New York–Penn League	Hank Majeski
Rookie	Johnson City Yankees	Appalachian League	Steve Hamilton

Kinston affiliation shared with Atlanta Braves

== Awards and honors ==
All-Star Game

- Thurman Munson, catcher
- Bobby Murcer, outfield, starter
- Sparky Lyle, pitcher
