= 1973 Detroit Tigers season =

Major League Baseball season

1973 Detroit Tigers
- League: American League
- Division: East
- Ballpark: Tiger Stadium
- City: Detroit, Michigan
- Owners: John Fetzer
- General managers: Jim Campbell
- Managers: Billy Martin, Joe Schultz
- Television: WJBK (George Kell, Larry Osterman)
- Radio: WJR (Ernie Harwell, Paul Carey)

The 1973 Detroit Tigers season was the team's 73rd season and the 62nd season at Tiger Stadium. The Tigers compiled a record of 85–77. They finished in third place in the AL East, 12 games behind the Baltimore Orioles. They were outscored by their opponents 674 to 642.

== Offseason ==
- November 30, 1972: Rich Reese was purchased by the Tigers from the Minnesota Twins.

== Regular season ==
- April 27, 1973: Steve Busby threw the first no-hitter in Kansas City Royals history against the Tigers. The Royals beat Detroit by a score of 3–0.

=== Season standings ===
AL East
Team	W	L	Pct.	GB	Home	Road
Baltimore Orioles	97	65	.599	—	50‍–‍31	47‍–‍34
Boston Red Sox	89	73	.549	8	48‍–‍33	41‍–‍40
Detroit Tigers	85	77	.525	12	47‍–‍34	38‍–‍43
New York Yankees	80	82	.494	17	50‍–‍31	30‍–‍51
Milwaukee Brewers	74	88	.457	23	40‍–‍41	34‍–‍47
Cleveland Indians	71	91	.438	26	34‍–‍47	37‍–‍44

=== Record vs. opponents ===
1973 American League record Sources:
Team	BAL	BOS	CAL	CWS	CLE	DET	KC	MIL	MIN	NYY	OAK	TEX
Baltimore	—	7–11	6–6	8–4	12–6	9–9	8–4	15–3	8–4	9–9	5–7	10–2
Boston	11–7	—	7–5	6–6	9–9	3–15	8–4	12–6	6–6	14–4	4–8	9–3
California	6–6	5–7	—	8–10	5–7	7–5	10–8	5–7	10–8	6–6	6–12	11–7
Chicago	4–8	6–6	10–8	—	7–5	5–7	6–12	3–9	9–9	8–4	6–12	13–5
Cleveland	6–12	9–9	7–5	5–7	—	9–9	2–10	9–9	7–5	7–11	3–9	7–5
Detroit	9–9	15–3	5–7	7–5	9–9	—	4–8	12–6	5–7	7–11	7–5	5–7
Kansas City	4–8	4–8	8–10	12–6	10–2	8–4	—	8–4	9–9	6–6	8–10	11–7
Milwaukee	3–15	6–12	7–5	9–3	9–9	6–12	4–8	—	8–4	10–8	4–8	8–4
Minnesota	4–8	6–6	8–10	9–9	5–7	7–5	9–9	4–8	—	3–9	14–4	12–6
New York	9–9	4–14	6–6	4–8	11–7	11–7	6–6	8–10	9–3	—	4–8	8–4
Oakland	7–5	8–4	12–6	12–6	9–3	5–7	10–8	8–4	4–14	8–4	—	11–7
Texas	2–10	3–9	7–11	5–13	5–7	7–5	7–11	4–8	6–12	4–8	7–11	—

=== Notable transactions ===
- April 2, 1973: Tim Hosley was traded by the Tigers to the Oakland Athletics for Don Shaw.
- June 5, 1973: Bob Adams was drafted by the Tigers in the 3rd round of the 1973 Major League Baseball draft.
- August 17, 1973: Rich Reese was released by the Tigers.

=== Roster ===
1973 Detroit Tigers
Roster
Pitchers: 15 Joe Coleman; 28 Ed Farmer; 38 Woodie Fryman; 18 John Hiller; 20 Fred Holdsworth; 45 Gary Ignasiak; 30 Lerrin LaGrow; 35 Dave Lemanczyk; 29 Mickey Lolich; 17 Bob Miller; 31 Jim Perry; 39 Fred Scherman; 37 Chuck Seelbach; 14 Bill Slayback; 34 Mike Strahler; 28 Tom Timmermann	Catchers: 36 Bob Didier; 11 Bill Freehan; 12 Duke Sims; Infielders: 8 Ed Brinkman; 9 Ike Brown; 25 Norm Cash; 33 Frank Howard; 44 John Knox; 3 Dick McAuliffe; 7,20 Rich Reese; 4 Aurelio Rodríguez; 42 Joe Staton; 10 Tony Taylor; 7 Tom Veryzer	Outfielders: 26 Gates Brown; 22 Ron Cash; 23 Willie Horton; 6 Al Kaline; 21 Marvin Lane; 5 Jim Northrup; 27 Dick Sharon; 24 Mickey Stanley; Other batters: 40 John Gamble	Manager: 1 Billy Martin; 51 Joe Schultz; Coaches: 50 Art Fowler; 51 Joe Schultz; 52 Charlie Silvera; 53 Dick Tracewski

== Player stats ==
=== Batting ===
==== Starters by position ====
Note: Pos = Position; G = Games played; AB = At bats; H = Hits; Avg. = Batting average; HR = Home runs; RBI = Runs batted in

Pos	Player	G	AB	H	Avg.	HR	RBI
C	Bill Freehan	110	380	89	.234	6	29
1B	Norm Cash	121	363	95	.262	19	40
2B	Dick McAuliffe	106	343	94	.274	12	47
3B	Aurelio Rodríguez	160	555	123	.222	9	58
SS	Ed Brinkman	162	515	122	.237	7	40
LF	Willie Horton	111	411	130	.316	17	53
CF	Mickey Stanley	157	602	147	.244	17	57
RF	Jim Northrup	119	404	124	.307	12	44
DH	Gates Brown	125	377	89	.236	12	50

==== Other batters ====
Note: G = Games played; AB = At bats; H = Hits; Avg. = Batting average; HR = Home runs; RBI = Runs batted in

Player	G	AB	H	Avg.	HR	RBI
Al Kaline	91	310	79	.255	10	45
Tony Taylor	84	275	63	.229	5	24
Duke Sims	80	252	61	.242	8	30
Frank Howard	85	227	58	.256	12	29
Dick Sharon	91	178	43	.242	7	16
Rich Reese	59	102	14	.137	2	4
Ike Brown	42	76	22	.289	1	9
Ron Cash	14	39	16	.410	0	6
John Knox	12	32	9	.281	0	3
Bob Didier	7	22	10	.455	0	1
Tom Veryzer	18	20	6	.300	0	2
Joe Staton	9	17	4	.235	0	3
Marvin Lane	6	8	2	.250	1	2
John Gamble	7	0	0	----	0	0

=== Pitching ===
==== Starting pitchers ====
Note: G = Games; IP = Innings pitched; W = Wins; L = Losses; ERA = Earned run average; SO = Strikeouts

Player	G	IP	W	L	ERA	SO
Mickey Lolich	42	308.2	16	15	3.82	214
Joe Coleman	40	288.1	23	15	3.53	202
Jim Perry	35	203.0	14	13	4.03	66
Woodie Fryman	34	169.2	6	13	5.36	119

==== Other pitchers ====
Note: G = Games pitched; IP = Innings pitched; W = Wins; L = Losses; ERA = Earned run average; SO = Strikeouts

Player	G	IP	W	L	ERA	SO
Mike Strahler	22	80.1	4	5	4.37	37
Fred Holdsworth	5	14.2	0	1	6.75	9
Gary Ignasiak	3	4.2	0	0	3.86	4

==== Relief pitchers ====
Note: G = Games pitched; W = Wins; L = Losses; SV = Saves; GF = Games finished; ERA = Earned run average; SO = Strikeouts

Player	G	W	L	SV	GF	ERA	SO
John Hiller	65	10	5	38	60	1.44	124
Fred Scherman	34	2	2	1	17	4.23	28
Ed Farmer	24	3	0	2	12	5.00	28
Bob Miller	22	4	2	1	10	3.43	23
Lerrin LaGrow	21	1	5	3	7	4.33	33
Tom Timmermann	17	1	1	1	7	3.69	21
Chuck Seelbach	5	1	0	0	0	3.86	2
Bill Slayback	3	0	0	0	1	4.50	1
Dave Lemanczyk	1	0	0	0	0	11.57	0

== Awards and honors ==
- John Hiller, Hutch Award
- Al Kaline, Roberto Clemente Award
- Mickey Stanley, AL Gold Glove Award, outfield

=== League top ten finishers ===
Ed Brinkman

- MLB leader in games played (162)
- AL leader in games played at shortstop (162)
- AL leader in complete games at shortstop (141)
- AL leader in innings played at shortstop (1390-2/3)
- #2 in AL in sacrifice hits (14)
- #2 in AL times grounded into double plays (22)

Joe Coleman

- AL leader in hit batsmen (10)
- #2 in AL in wins (23)
- #4 in AL in home runs allowed (32)
- #5 in MLB in games started (40)
- #9 in MLB in batters faced (1219)

Bill Freehan

- #2 in AL in times hit by pitch (11)

John Hiller

- MLB leader in saves (38)
- AL leader in games (65)
- AL leader in games finished (60)
- #5 in AL in win percentage (.667)

Al Kaline

- 4th oldest player in AL (38)

Mickey Lolich

- #2 in MLB in games started (42)
- #2 in MLB in home runs allowed (35)
- #2 in MLB in hits allowed (315)
- #2 in AL in strikeout to walk ratio (2.71)
- #3 in MLB in earned runs allowed (131)
- #5 in AL in bases on balls per 9 innings pitched (2.30)
- #5 in AL in strikeouts (214)
- #5 in AL in wild pitches (12)
- #6 in MLB in batters faced (1286)
- #7 in MLB in innings pitched (308.7)

Aurelio Rodríguez

- AL leader in games played at third base (160)
- AL leader in complete games at third base (151)
- AL leader in innings played at third base (1394-2/3)
- #5 in AL in games played (160)

Mickey Stanley

- #4 in AL in outs (481)

=== Players ranking among top 100 all time at position ===
The following members of the 1975 Detroit Tigers are among the Top 100 of all time at their position, as ranked by The Bill James Historical Baseball Abstract in 2001:

- Bill Freehan: 12th best catcher of all time
- Norm Cash: 20th best first baseman of all time
- Aurelio Rodríguez: 91st best third baseman of all time
- Al Kaline: 11th best right fielder of all time
- Willie Horton: 55th best left fielder of all time
- Mickey Lolich: 72nd best pitcher of all time

== Farm system ==
Level	Team	League	Manager
AAA	Toledo Mud Hens	International League	Johnny Lipon and Cot Deal
AA	Montgomery Rebels	Southern League	Fred Hatfield
A	Lakeland Tigers	Florida State League	Stubby Overmire
A	Clinton Pilots	Midwest League	Jim Leyland
A	Anderson Tigers	Western Carolinas League	Len Okrie
Rookie	Bristol Tigers	Appalachian League	Joe Lewis

LEAGUE CHAMPIONS: Montgomery
