= Tom Ragland =

American baseball player (born 1946)

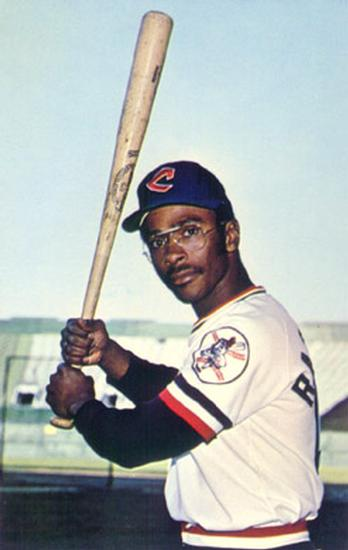
- Second baseman
- Born: June 16, 1946 (age 80); Talladega, Alabama, U.S.
- Batted: Right Threw: Right

MLB debut
- April 5, 1971, for the Washington Senators

Last MLB appearance
- September 29, 1973, for the Cleveland Indians

MLB statistics
- Batting average: .231
- Home runs: 0
- Runs batted in: 14
- Stats at Baseball Reference

Teams
- Washington Senators / Texas Rangers (1971–1972); Cleveland Indians (1973)

Thomas Ragland (born June 16, 1946) is an American former professional baseball player who appeared in 102 games in Major League Baseball, mostly as a second baseman, for the Washington Senators / Texas Rangers from 1971 to 1972, and the Cleveland Indians in 1973. He also played for seven different minor league clubs in parts of nine seasons spanning 1965–1974.

Born in Talladega, Alabama, and raised in Detroit, where he graduated from Northern High School, Ragland threw and batted right-handed, stood 5 feet 10 inches (1.78 m) and weighed 155 pounds (70 kg). His professional baseball career began when he was selected by Washington in the 15th round of the first-ever amateur draft. He would not reach the MLB Senators until 1971, when he had early and late season auditions for the team, which was playing its final season in Washington. In 1972, the club's first year as the Texas Rangers, Ragland spent the first four months of the campaign at Triple-A Denver before his recall in late July. He appeared in 25 games through the end of the year, struggling at bat, collecting only ten hits. On November 30, 1972, he was traded to the Cleveland Indians for pitcher Vince Colbert.

He spent the full 1973 season with Cleveland, appearing in 67 games and starting 50 as the club's second baseman. He batted a respectable .257 with 47 hits. But during the off-season, his contract was sold to the Houston Astros' organization. With the veteran Tommy Helms entrenched at second base, Ragland played the entire year back at Triple-A Denver before retiring from the field.

In his 102 MLB games, Ragland collected 61 total hits, with nine doubles and one triple. He was credited with 14 runs batted in and batted .231 lifetime.

He returned to the Detroit area, where he worked for a local milk-processing plant and scouted for the Texas Rangers. He's a member of the Detroit High School Hall of Fame.
