= 1973 Kansas City Royals season =

1973 Kansas City Royals
- League: American League
- Division: West
- Ballpark: Royals Stadium
- City: Kansas City, Missouri
- Record: 88–74 (.543)
- Divisional place: 2nd
- Owners: Ewing Kauffman
- General managers: Cedric Tallis
- Managers: Jack McKeon (first season)
- Television: KBMA
- Radio: KMBZ (Buddy Blattner, Denny Matthews, Fred White)

The 1973 Kansas City Royals season was their fifth in Major League Baseball and first in the new Royals Stadium. Promoted from Triple-A Omaha, Jack McKeon replaced the fired Bob Lemon as manager and the Royals finished second in the American League West in 1973 with a record of 88–74, six games behind the Oakland A's.

The 88 wins were the most in the franchise's brief history, five more than in 1971. Lefthander Paul Splittorff (20–11) became the first Royal to win twenty games in a season.

== Offseason ==
- November 30, 1972: Roger Nelson and Richie Scheinblum were traded to the Cincinnati Reds for Hal McRae and Wayne Simpson.
- February 1, 1973: Joe Keough was traded to the Chicago White Sox for Jim Lyttle.

== Regular season ==
The Royals opened the new Royals Stadium with a 12–1 rout of the Texas Rangers on April 10. The Tuesday night game was attended by 39,464 braving cool temperatures; 39 °F (4 °C) at first pitch.

On April 27, Steve Busby threw the first no-hitter in Royals history, as visiting KC shut out Detroit 3–0 at Tiger Stadium.

At Royals Stadium on May 15, Nolan Ryan of the California Angels threw the first no-hitter of his career.

On August 2, George Brett made his major league debut, starting at third base and hitting a single in a 3–1 road win over the`Chicago White Sox.

=== Season standings ===
AL West
Team	W	L	Pct.	GB	Home	Road
Oakland Athletics	94	68	.580	—	50‍–‍31	44‍–‍37
Kansas City Royals	88	74	.543	6	48‍–‍33	40‍–‍41
Minnesota Twins	81	81	.500	13	37‍–‍44	44‍–‍37
California Angels	79	83	.488	15	43‍–‍38	36‍–‍45
Chicago White Sox	77	85	.475	17	40‍–‍41	37‍–‍44
Texas Rangers	57	105	.352	37	35‍–‍46	22‍–‍59

=== Record vs. opponents ===
1973 American League record Sources:
Team	BAL	BOS	CAL	CWS	CLE	DET	KC	MIL	MIN	NYY	OAK	TEX
Baltimore	—	7–11	6–6	8–4	12–6	9–9	8–4	15–3	8–4	9–9	5–7	10–2
Boston	11–7	—	7–5	6–6	9–9	3–15	8–4	12–6	6–6	14–4	4–8	9–3
California	6–6	5–7	—	8–10	5–7	7–5	10–8	5–7	10–8	6–6	6–12	11–7
Chicago	4–8	6–6	10–8	—	7–5	5–7	6–12	3–9	9–9	8–4	6–12	13–5
Cleveland	6–12	9–9	7–5	5–7	—	9–9	2–10	9–9	7–5	7–11	3–9	7–5
Detroit	9–9	15–3	5–7	7–5	9–9	—	4–8	12–6	5–7	7–11	7–5	5–7
Kansas City	4–8	4–8	8–10	12–6	10–2	8–4	—	8–4	9–9	6–6	8–10	11–7
Milwaukee	3–15	6–12	7–5	9–3	9–9	6–12	4–8	—	8–4	10–8	4–8	8–4
Minnesota	4–8	6–6	8–10	9–9	5–7	7–5	9–9	4–8	—	3–9	14–4	12–6
New York	9–9	4–14	6–6	4–8	11–7	11–7	6–6	8–10	9–3	—	4–8	8–4
Oakland	7–5	8–4	12–6	12–6	9–3	5–7	10–8	8–4	4–14	8–4	—	11–7
Texas	2–10	3–9	7–11	5–13	5–7	7–5	7–11	4–8	6–12	4–8	7–11	—

=== Notable transactions ===
- April 2: Greg Minton was traded to the San Francisco Giants for Fran Healy.
- May 8: Tom Murphy was traded to the St. Louis Cardinals for Al Santorini.
- June 5: 1973 Major League Baseball draft
  - Ruppert Jones was selected in the third round.
  - Rob Picciolo was selected in the fourth round of the secondary phase, but did not sign.

=== Roster ===
1973 Kansas City Royals
Roster
Pitchers: 39 Norm Angelini; 29 Doug Bird; 22 Tom Burgmeier; 40 Steve Busby; 43 Bruce Dal Canton; 41 Dick Drago; 39 Al Fitzmorris; 32 Gene Garber; 27 Joe Hoerner; 25 Mike Jackson; 27 Mark Littell; 23 Steve Mingori; 20 Barry Raziano; 45 Wayne Simpson; 34 Paul Splittorff; 28 Ken Wright	Catchers: 16 Fran Healy; 42 Buck Martinez; 12 Jerry May; 14 Carl Taylor; Infielders: 2 Kurt Bevacqua; 25 George Brett; 15 Bobby Floyd; 18 Gail Hopkins; 7 John Mayberry; 17 Frank Ortenzio; 37 Freddie Patek; 1 Cookie Rojas; 10 Paul Schaal; 19 Frank White	Outfielders: 30 Steve Hovley; 8 Ed Kirkpatrick; 42 Keith Marshall; 11 Hal McRae; 26 Amos Otis; 9 Lou Piniella; 5 Tom Poquette; 12 Rick Reichardt; 6 Jim Wohlford	Manager: 31 Jack McKeon; Coaches: 3 Galen Cisco (Pitching); 4 Harry Dunlop (Third base); 24 Charley Lau (Hitting & first base)

== Player stats ==
= Indicates team leader

=== Batting ===
==== Starters by position ====
Note: Pos = Position; G = Games played; AB = At bats; H = Hits; Avg. = Batting average; HR = Home runs; RBI = Runs batted in

Pos	Player	G	AB	H	Avg.	HR	RBI
C	Fran Healy	95	279	77	.276	6	34
1B	John Mayberry	152	510	142	.278	26	100
2B	Cookie Rojas	139	551	152	.276	6	69
SS	Freddie Patek	135	501	117	.234	5	45
3B	Paul Schaal	121	396	114	.288	8	42
LF	Lou Piniella	144	513	128	.250	9	69
CF	Amos Otis	148	583	175	.300	26	93
RF	Ed Kirkpatrick	126	429	113	.263	6	45
DH	Gail Hopkins	74	138	34	.246	2	16

==== Other batters ====
Note: G = Games played; AB = At bats; H = Hits; Avg. = Batting average; HR = Home runs; RBI = Runs batted in

Player	G	AB	H	Avg.	HR	RBI
Hal McRae	106	338	79	.234	9	50
Kurt Bevacqua	99	276	71	.257	2	40
Steve Hovley	104	232	59	.254	2	24
Carl Taylor	69	145	33	.228	0	16
Frank White	51	139	31	.223	0	5
Rick Reichardt	41	127	28	.220	3	17
Jim Wohlford	45	109	29	.266	2	10
Bobby Floyd	51	78	26	.333	0	8
George Brett	13	40	5	.125	0	0
Buck Martinez	14	32	8	.250	1	6
Jerry May	11	30	4	.133	0	2
Tom Poquette	21	28	6	.214	0	3
Frank Ortenzio	9	25	7	.280	1	6
Keith Marshall	8	9	2	.222	0	3

=== Pitching ===
==== Starting pitchers ====
Note: G = Games pitched; IP = Innings pitched; W = Wins; L = Losses; ERA = Earned run average; SO = Strikeouts

Player	G	IP	W	L	ERA	SO
Paul Splittorff	38	262.0	20	11	3.98	110
Steve Busby	37	238.1	16	15	4.23	174
Dick Drago	37	212.2	12	14	4.23	98
Al Fitzmorris	15	89.0	8	3	2.83	26
Mark Littell	8	38.0	1	3	5.68	16

==== Other pitchers ====
Note: G = Games pitched; IP = Innings pitched; W = Wins; L = Losses; ERA = Earned run average; SO = Strikeouts

Player	G	IP	W	L	ERA	SO
Gene Garber	48	152.2	9	9	4.24	60
Ken Wright	25	80.2	6	5	4.91	75
Wayne Simpson	16	59.2	3	4	5.73	29

==== Relief pitchers ====
Note: G = Games pitched; W = Wins; L = Losses; SV = Saves; ERA = Earned run average; SO = Strikeouts

Player	G	W	L	SV	ERA	SO
Doug Bird	54	4	4	20	2.99	83
Bruce Dal Canton	32	4	3	3	4.81	38
Joe Hoerner	22	2	0	4	5.12	15
Steve Mingori	19	3	3	1	3.04	46
Mike Jackson	9	0	0	0	6.85	13
Tom Burgmeier	6	0	0	1	5.40	4
Barry Raziano	2	0	0	0	5.40	0
Norm Angelini	7	0	0	1	4.91	3

== Awards and honors ==
All-Star Game

- Amos Otis, Outfield, Starter
- John Mayberry, 1B, Reserve
- Cookie Rojas, 2B, Reserve

== Farm system ==
Level	Team	League	Manager
AAA	Omaha Royals	American Association	Harry Malmberg
AA	Jacksonville Suns	Southern League	Billy Gardner
A	San Jose Bees	California League	Steve Boros
A	Waterloo Royals	Midwest League	Bill Scripture
Rookie	Kingsport Royals	Appalachian League	John Sullivan
Rookie	GCL Royals	Gulf Coast League	Buzzy Keller
Rookie	Billings Mustangs	Pioneer League	Gary Blaylock

LEAGUE CHAMPIONS: Kingsport, Billings
