= Dave Duncan (baseball) =

American baseball player and coach (born 1945)

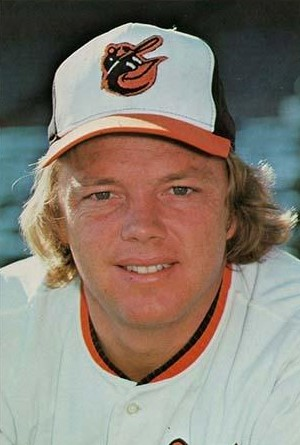
- Catcher / Coach
- Born: September 26, 1945 (age 80); Dallas, Texas, U.S.
- Batted: Right Threw: Right

MLB debut
- May 6, 1964, for the Kansas City Athletics

Last MLB appearance
- October 1, 1976, for the Baltimore Orioles

MLB statistics
- Batting average: .214
- Home runs: 109
- Runs batted in: 341
- Stats at Baseball Reference

Teams
- As player: Kansas City / Oakland Athletics (1964, 1967–1972); Cleveland Indians (1973–1974); Baltimore Orioles (1975–1976); As coach: Cleveland Indians (1978–1981); Seattle Mariners (1982); Chicago White Sox (1983–1986); Oakland Athletics (1986–1995); St. Louis Cardinals (1996–2011)

Career highlights and awards
- All-Star (1971); 4× World Series champion (1972, 1989, 2006, 2011); St. Louis Cardinals Hall of Fame

David Edwin Duncan (born September 26, 1945) is an American former professional baseball catcher and coach. He played 11 seasons in Major League Baseball (MLB) for the Kansas City / Oakland Athletics, Cleveland Indians, and Baltimore Orioles.

After retiring as a player, Duncan served as the pitching coach for the Indians, Seattle Mariners, Chicago White Sox, Athletics, and St. Louis Cardinals. Four pitchers he coached won the Cy Young Award in 1983, 1990, 1992, and 2005. He was also a member of four World Series champion teams in 1972, 1989, 2006, and 2011. Each year from 1983 to 2011, Duncan worked with former manager Tony La Russa on the White Sox, Athletics, and Cardinals.

== Playing career ==
=== Minor leagues (1963–66) ===
Duncan was signed as an amateur free agent by the Kansas City Athletics in 1963, as a 17-year-old out of Crawford High School in San Diego. In his first at-bat as a professional baseball player, he hit a home run for the Daytona Beach Islanders of the Florida State League. Duncan made his major league debut on May 6, 1964 at the age of 18, becoming the youngest player in the American League at the time. He was kept in the majors to protect him from being drafted by another team under baseball rules.

Duncan returned to the minor leagues for the next two seasons, first with the Lewiston Broncs in the Single-A Northwest League in Lewiston, Idaho. Midway through the 1965 season, Rick Monday joined the team. A 19-year-old sophomore center fielder with Arizona State, Monday had led the Sun Devils to the 1965 College World Series title on June 12 and was the first pick in the first major league draft four days earlier. After the season, Duncan and Monday entered boot camp with the U.S. Marine Corps in San Diego in September.

The following year in 1966, Duncan led the California League with 46 home runs in 121 games for the Modesto Reds, the A's affiliate. The second pick in the 1966 MLB draft was another Arizona State center fielder, 20-year-old Reggie Jackson. He played two weeks in Lewiston then joined Duncan in Modesto in early July, and kept pace with 21 homers in 56 games.

=== Kansas City/Oakland Athletics (1967–72) ===
Duncan began the 1967 season with the Birmingham A's but, was brought back up to the major leagues in early June. When his batting average dropped to a .194 in early July, he was returned to Birmingham to work on his hitting. When his hitting showed signs of improvement, Duncan returned to the major leagues in September, along with Jackson and Joe Rudi.

Athletics' team owner Charlie Finley moved the franchise west to Oakland for the 1968 season, but Duncan started the season with the Vancouver Mounties of the Triple-A Pacific Coast League. He was called up to the majors in June when catcher Jim Pagliaroni suffered a broken arm and went on the disabled list. Duncan went on to catch the majority of the team's games in 1968. While he possessed good defensive skills, he only managed to hit for a .191 batting average. His batting average fell further to .126 in 1969 and Phil Roof took over as the Athletic's main catcher. Duncan's hitting improved in 1970 to a career-high .259 batting average along with 10 home runs and 29 runs batted in as, he shared catching duties with Frank Fernández and Gene Tenace, who was called up to the major leagues late in the season. He also missed time due to his commitment to the military reserves. When Duncan made adverse comments about Finley during the season, the owner fired Athletics manager John McNamara in October for failing to control his players, despite the team's second-place finish in the American League Western Division.

The 1971 season saw Duncan become the Athletics main catcher, as he guided their pitching staff to finish second in the league in earned run average as well as in strikeouts. Duncan was the catcher for two 20-game winners in 1971, as Vida Blue won 24 games and Catfish Hunter won 21 games. His offense continued to improve, hitting 10 home runs by mid-season and, was selected as a reserve on the 1971 American League All-Star team, replacing Ray Fosse who missed the game due to an injury. Duncan finished the season with a .253 average with 15 home runs, 40 runs batted in while leading American League catchers in range factor. The Athletics would win the American League Western Division but, were defeated by the Baltimore Orioles in the 1971 American League Championship Series.

1972 would be Duncan's best season offensively as he hit 19 home runs with 59 runs batted in, although his batting average slipped to .218. He committed only five errors in 113 games played for a career-high .993 fielding percentage, second only to Johnny Oates among American League catchers. With Duncan calling the pitches, the Athletics' pitching staff led the league in winning percentage and in shutouts and, once again finished second in earned run average as, the team captured their second consecutive Western Division title. Despite Duncan's production, Athletics manager Dick Williams, a proponent of the platoon system, began using Gene Tenace as the starting catcher during the last month of the season. The Athletics defeated the Detroit Tigers in the 1972 American League Championship Series and then the Cincinnati Reds in the World Series.

=== Cleveland Indians and Baltimore Orioles (1973–76) ===
Although Duncan joined the Athletics in spring training, he became embroiled in a contract dispute with Finley. He was traded along with George Hendrick to the Cleveland Indians for Ray Fosse and Jack Heidemann on March 24, 1973. Duncan became the Indians' starting catcher in 1973 however, he broke his wrist on June 28 and missed two months of the season. He finished the season hitting for a .233 average with 17 home runs and 43 runs batted in while leading American League catchers in range factor. He played in a career-high 136 games in the 1974 season but, the heavy workload caused his batting average to fall to .200. Duncan was acquired along with minor league outfielder Alvin McGrew by the Baltimore Orioles from the Indians for Boog Powell and Don Hood on February 25 1975. With the Orioles, Duncan shared catching duties with Elrod Hendricks during the 1975 season before Rick Dempsey took over as the Orioles starting catcher in 1976. Duncan was dealt from the Orioles to the Chicago White Sox for Pat Kelly on November 18, 1976. When the White Sox released him in March 1977, he retired as a player at the age of 32.

=== Career statistics ===
In an eleven-year major league career, Duncan played in 929 games, accumulating 617 hits in 2,885 at-bats for a .214 career batting average along with 109 home runs, 341 runs batted in and an on-base percentage of .279. While he was a light-hitting player, he excelled as a defensive catcher, ending his career with a .984 fielding percentage. He was respected during his playing career for his defensive skills and for his knowledge of the game of baseball. In spite of his low average he hit 109 home runs, one for every 26.5 at-bats. During his time with the Athletics, he first met future manager Tony La Russa, then a utility infielder with the club.

==== Highlights ====
- Six two-home run games, his team winning all six.
- One five-hit game, including four singles and a home run against the Boston Red Sox (July 12, 1972).
- A pair of four-hit games, including two doubles and two singles against the New York Yankees (May 5, 1970) and a record-tying four consecutive doubles off of Luis Tiant of the Boston Red Sox (June 30, 1975). In the other 95 games he played in 1975 he hit only three other doubles.
- Nineteen three-hit games, with the most impressive being two home runs and a double against the California Angels (May 25, 1971).
- One five-RBI game, including a three-run home run, a bases loaded walk, and an RBI single against the California Angels (September 21, 1969).
- Four four-RBI games.
- Named to the American League All-Star team.

== Coaching career ==
Duncan began his coaching career in 1978 with the Cleveland Indians. After a stint as a pitching coach for the Seattle Mariners in 1982, he joined former teammate La Russa, then the manager of the Chicago White Sox. Duncan would be La Russa's pitching coach for the next 30 years, following him to Oakland in 1986 and then the Cardinals in 1996. Beginning in 1986, first base coach Dave McKay also began a long tenure of working with Duncan and La Russa. The three men continued to work together until the Cardinals won the 2011 World Series. La Russa retired immediately after that World Series and Duncan retired from coaching less than three months later. McKay also moved on, accepting the first base coaching role with the Chicago Cubs.

Pitchers on Duncan's staffs won four Cy Young Awards: LaMarr Hoyt in 1983; Bob Welch in 1990; Dennis Eckersley in 1992; and Chris Carpenter in 2005. Dave Stewart, who had not found consistent success before signing with Oakland as a free agent in 1986, won 20 or more games and pitched 250 or more innings four straight seasons from 1987 to 1990. From 1988 through 1990, Oakland pitchers had the lowest earned run average (ERA) in the American League, and the 2005 St. Louis staff had the lowest ERA in the majors. La Russa regularly credits Duncan as being a key factor in the success of the teams he managed for over 25 years.

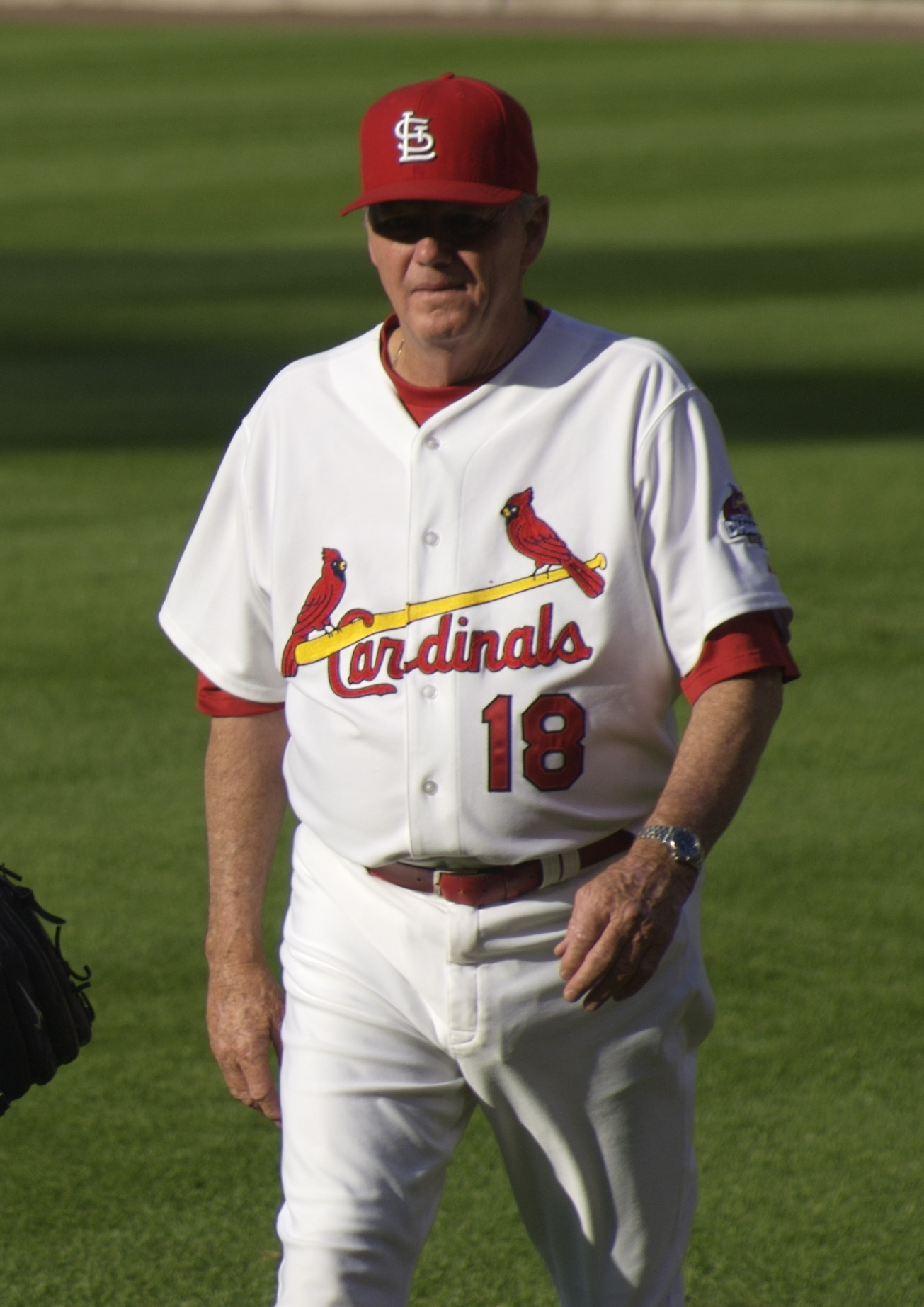
Duncan in 2007

In October 2010, Duncan signed a two-year contract extension, keeping him with the Cardinals through 2012 with an option for 2013. He took an indeterminate leave of absence from the Cardinals on January 5, 2012, to spend time with his wife, Jeanine, who was dealing with cancer. Duncan's semi-retirement effectively ended his tenure with the Cardinals. During his sixteen seasons as the Cardinals' pitching coach, the pitching staff had the third-lowest overall ERA in MLB as well as the third-lowest starters' ERA.

== Pitching consultant career ==
On November 13, 2013, the Arizona Diamondbacks announced they had hired Duncan to be a special assistant to general manager Kevin Towers as a pitching consultant. "With Dave, he's going to set his own schedule and it will depend on what he wants to do and what he's capable of doing", Towers commented of his role. "During spring training, be available to work with pitchers, catchers and pitching coaches as they're preparing for a game. Breaking down video of pitchers we might be considering for the draft. Plus, targeting guys in our system and getting his input – who he likes, who is close."

== Personal life ==
Duncan lives in Kimberling City, Missouri. He resided with his wife, Jeanine, until her death on June 6, 2013, after a battle against glioblastoma, a type of brain cancer.

His younger son, Chris, was drafted by the St. Louis Cardinals and made his major league debut in 2005. Chris died on September 6, 2019, from glioblastoma. His older son, Shelley, was selected in the second round of the 2001 draft by the New York Yankees and debuted in the Major Leagues on July 20, 2007.

Duncan has two daughters from his first marriage, Tiffany Duncan and Devannie Duncan, who both reside in Orange County, California.

== See also ==
- List of St. Louis Cardinals coaches
- List of second-generation Major League Baseball players

Sporting positions
Preceded by Chuck Hartenstein	Cleveland Indians pitching coach 1980–1981	Succeeded by Mel Queen
Preceded by Wes Stock	Seattle Mariners pitching coach 1982	Succeeded by Frank Funk
Preceded by Ken Silvestri	Chicago White Sox pitching coach 1983–1986	Succeeded by Dick Bosman
Preceded by Wes Stock	Oakland Athletics pitching coach 1986–1995	Succeeded by Bob Cluck
Preceded by Bob Gibson	St. Louis Cardinals pitching coach 1996–2011	Succeeded by Derek Lilliquist
