= Jerry Moses =

American baseball player (1946–2018)

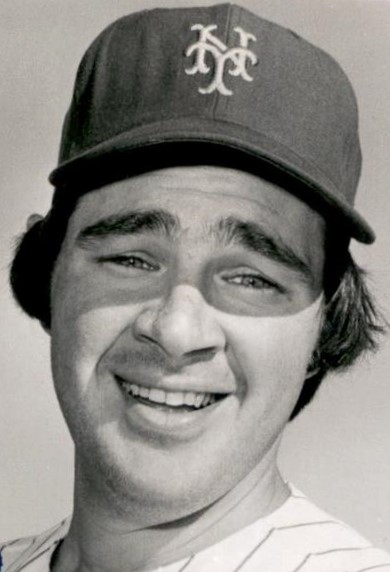
- Catcher
- Born: August 9, 1946; Yazoo City, Mississippi, U.S.
- Died: March 26, 2018 (aged 71); Haverhill, Massachusetts, U.S.
- Batted: Right Threw: Right

MLB debut
- May 9, 1965, for the Boston Red Sox

Last MLB appearance
- August 9, 1975, for the Chicago White Sox

MLB statistics
- Batting average: .251
- Home runs: 25
- Runs batted in: 109
- Stats at Baseball Reference

Teams
- Boston Red Sox (1965, 1968–1970); California Angels (1971); Cleveland Indians (1972); New York Yankees (1973); Detroit Tigers (1974); San Diego Padres (1975); Chicago White Sox (1975)

Career highlights and awards
- All-Star (1970)

Gerald Braheen Moses (August 9, 1946 – March 26, 2018) was an American professional baseball player. A catcher, he signed a bonus contract with the Boston Red Sox in 1964 and spent his early Major League Baseball career with the Bosox, and over the course of his nine years in MLB Moses played for seven different teams. He batted and threw right-handed, stood 6 feet 3 inches (1.91 m) tall and weighed 210 pounds (95 kg).

== Early life ==
Moses was born on August 9, 1946, in Yazoo City, Mississippi to Samuel S. and Mary Frances Moses. He attended Yazoo City High School, graduating in 1964. He played football (quarterback) as well as baseball (catcher), and was a high school All-American and two-year All-State at quarterback. He played baseball under coach Robert "Cob" Jarvis, a former professional baseball player who provided Moses with significant guidance. Moses was offered a scholarship by Paul "Bear" Bryant to attend the University of Alabama as a quarterback, as well as receiving offers from other college football programs. After graduating high school, however, Moses signed a contract for $50,000 with the Boston Red Sox, and was immediately included on its 40-player roster.

== Professional baseball career ==
=== Minor league ===
In 1964, Moses began his professional career out of high school at age 17 with the Single-A Wellsville Red Sox of the New York-Pennsylvania League. He played in 67 games with a .279 batting average and 13 home runs. He also played in the Florida Instructional League that year.

In 1965, at age 18, due to his bonus status, he had to stay with the Red Sox or be exposed in the draft, and was on the team for three months, with only four pinch hit appearances. He hit a home run in his second major league at bat, becoming the youngest player ever to hit a pinch hit home run with the Red Sox. He shared an apartment with Jim Lonborg, and roomed with Tony Conigliaro on the road.

Eventually that year, he was designated to the minor leagues and played Double-A baseball and Single-A for the remainder of 1965. In 1966 and 1967, he played Double-A ball with the Pittsfield Red Sox of the Eastern League, batting .263 and. 254 respectively. In 1968, he played for the Triple-A Louisville Colonels, batting .238, with 9 home runs, 52 runs batted in (RBI), and 45 runs scored.

=== Major league ===
He made the majors for good in 1969, starting 32 games at catcher and playing in 53 games overall, with a .304 batting average. In 1970, Moses served as Boston's first-string catcher and was selected to the American League All-Star team. After getting off to a strong first half of the season, he suffered injuries that limited his playing time and productivity as the year progressed. He played in only 92 games, hitting .263 with six home runs.

In 1970, he received the Bo Sox Club's Man of the Year Award, presented annually to a Red Sox player who distinguishes himself on and off the field.

Shortly after that All-Star season ended, Moses was included with Red Sox slugger Tony Conigliaro and Ray Jarvis in a blockbuster trade to the California Angels, in exchange for Ken Tatum, Jarvis Tatum and Doug Griffin, on October 11, 1970. He did not win the Angels' starting catcher job, starting only 47 games at catcher (with John Stephenson starting a majority of the games), and batted only .227 in 1971. This began his career as a journeyman, with limited starts as a catcher, and never spending more than one full season with the Angels (47 starts), Cleveland Indians (35 starts), New York Yankees (16 starts), Detroit Tigers (64 starts), San Diego Padres (three starts) and Chicago White Sox (no starts).

Moses was traded along with Graig Nettles from the Indians to the Yankees for John Ellis, Charlie Spikes, Rusty Torres and Jerry Kenney at the Winter Meetings on November 27, 1972. On March 19, 1974, the Yankees traded Moses to the Tigers as part of 3-team trade in which the Tigers sent Jim Perry to Cleveland; Cleveland sent Rick Sawyer and Walt "No-Neck" Williams to the Yankees; and the Tigers sent Ed Farmer to the Yankees. In January 1975, the Tigers sold his rights to the New York Mets, the Mets sold his rights to the Padres in April 1975, the Padres sold his rights to the White Sox in July 1975, and the White Sox released Moses in September 1975.

In 1974 with the Tigers, Moses played in his most games since his 1970 All-Star season, starting 64 games at catcher, but only hitting .237 with 4 home runs, 19 RBIs and 19 runs scored. He served as Detroit's primary catcher in 1974 (though starting less than half the team's games), sharing catching duties with Bill Freehan, Gene Lamont and John Wockenfuss.

Moses played in 386 major league games and collected 269 hits, 25 homes runs, 109 RBIs and 89 runs scored; and had a .984 lifetime fielding percentage as a catcher.

== Personal life ==
Moses had two children with his wife of fifty years, Carolyn (née Altieri).

After retiring from baseball, Moses started a career in the food service industry, beginning with Ogden Food Service Corporation, and then eventually starting his own food service and concession company, Fanfare, Inc., which he later sold. He was a co-owner of Ann's Boston Brownie Company.

Moses was involved in charitable activities, most notably the work with former teammate and friend Mike Andrews with the cancer research support foundation, the Jimmy Fund. He was involved in organizing a bone marrow donor program to support former Red Sox pitcher Bill Monbouquette. Moses received the Jimmy Award. He and Andrews worked together for 25 years in creating a children's baseball camp in Massachusetts. Andrews said of Moses, "'I don't think I ever met a better man in my life ... Everyone loved Jerry ... and he loved everybody back. He supported not only the Jimmy Fund but many other charities, and he was a very smart, successful businessman."

After his playing career, Moses was extremely involved with the Major League Baseball Players Alumni Association, championing increased benefits for inactive, non-vested former players who did not originally qualify for pension benefits, and acting as a catalyst for countless charitable events, including the Legends for Youth Clinic Series. Beloved by many due to his kind-hearted nature, Moses served as the chairman emeritus for Major League Alumni Marketing until his death.

Though in failing health, Moses attended the anniversary to the Red Sox "Impossible Dream" season at Fenway Park in August 2017. A Catholic, he attended Mass every Sunday in Rowley, Massachusetts, for the last few years of his life.

== Death ==
Moses died on March 26, 2018, in Haverhill, Massachusetts. He was 71 and had been in failing health for some time, after a long battle with dementia.
