= Leland MacPhail =

Leland MacPhail may refer to:

- Larry MacPhail (1890–1975), Leland MacPhail, baseball executive
- Lee MacPhail (1917–2012), Leland MacPhail, baseball executive, son of the above
