= Graig Nettles =

American professional baseball player, third baseman, coach (born 1944)

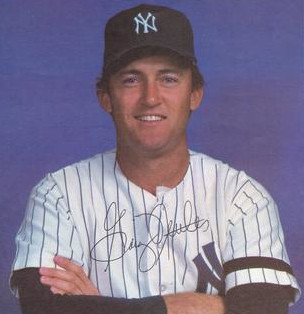
- Nettles with the New York Yankees in 1981
- Third baseman
- Born: August 20, 1944 (age 82); San Diego, California, U.S.
- Batted: Left Threw: Right

MLB debut
- September 6, 1967, for the Minnesota Twins

Last MLB appearance
- October 1, 1988, for the Montreal Expos

MLB statistics
- Batting average: .248
- Hits: 2,225
- Home runs: 390
- Runs batted in: 1,314
- Stats at Baseball Reference

Teams
- Minnesota Twins (1967–1969); Cleveland Indians (1970–1972); New York Yankees (1973–1983); San Diego Padres (1984–1986); Atlanta Braves (1987); Montreal Expos (1988)

Career highlights and awards
- 6× All-Star (1975, 1977–1980, 1985); 2× World Series champion (1977, 1978); ALCS MVP (1981); 2× Gold Glove Award (1977, 1978); AL home run leader (1976)

Graig Nettles (born August 20, 1944), nicknamed "Puff", is an American former Major League Baseball third baseman. During a 22-year baseball career, he played for the Minnesota Twins (1967–1969), Cleveland Indians (1970–1972), New York Yankees (1973–1983), San Diego Padres (1984–1986), Atlanta Braves (1987), and Montreal Expos (1988).

Nettles is regarded as one of the best defensive third basemen of all time, winning Gold Glove Awards in 1977 and 1978. Despite his relatively low career batting average, he was a clutch offensive contributor, particularly with runners in scoring position. In addition, he set an American League record for career home runs by a third baseman. His 68.0 Wins Above Replacement (WAR) is the highest among all players with a batting average of .250 or lower.

Nettles was a six-time All-Star player. As a part of four pennant-winning Yankee teams, Nettles enjoyed his best season in 1977 when he won the Gold Glove Award and had career-highs in home runs (37) and runs batted in (107) in leading the Yankees to the World Series against the Los Angeles Dodgers.

== Early life ==
Nettles was born and raised in San Diego, California. Nettles's unusual first name derives from his mother's dislike of the names Greg and Craig – and her combining the two to produce "Graig." "My dad was away at the war, so he didn't have any say." The name also led to confusion for baseball card companies; the error-prone inaugural 1981 Fleer baseball card set includes an error card where his name is spelled "Graig" on the front, and "Craig" on the back.

Nettles graduated from San Diego High School in 1962, then attended San Diego State College on a basketball scholarship, where he played for both the Aztecs' basketball and baseball teams. In 1964 and 1965, he played collegiate summer baseball for the Alaska Goldpanners of the Alaska Baseball League, helping to lead the team to two league championships.

== Career ==
The Minnesota Twins drafted Nettles in the fourth round (79th overall) of the 1965 Major League Baseball draft. He made his MLB debut with the Twins on September 6, 1967 as a pinch hitter for Jackie Hernández, flying out in his only at bat. Nettles played his first full major league season with the Twins in 1969, and batted .222 with seven home runs and 26 RBI in 96 games.

On December 10, 1969, the Twins traded Nettles with Dean Chance, Ted Uhlaender, and a player to be named later (PTBNL) to the Cleveland Indians for Luis Tiant and Stan Williams. After playing three seasons with the Indians, Nettles was acquired with Jerry Moses by the New York Yankees for John Ellis, Charlie Spikes, Rusty Torres and Jerry Kenney at the Winter Meetings on November 27, 1972. The Indians traded Nettles due to a feud between Nettles and manager Ken Aspromonte.

Nettles was named the AL player of the month for April 1974, as he set the AL record for home runs in a month with 11. On September 7, 1974, Nettles was caught using a bat that had six superballs inside it. He said that he had received the bat from a Yankees fan in Chicago and did not know that the bat had been altered.

On September 14, 1974, Nettles and his brother Jim homered in the same game, joining a select club that includes Bret and Aaron Boone, José and Héctor Cruz, Felipe and César Crespo, Al and Tony Cuccinello, Joe and Dom DiMaggio, and Rick and Wes Ferrell. The seven sets of brothers hit their homers playing for opposing teams.

Nettles began the 1975 season batting .287 with 14 home runs and 56 RBI in 86 games. He was named the starting third baseman for the AL in the 1975 MLB All-Star Game, the first All-Star selection of his career. Nettles finished the season with a .267 average, 21 home runs and 91 RBI in 157 games. He also led the AL in sacrifice flies, with 11.

During a brawl in a game against the Boston Red Sox on May 20, 1976, Nettles, who was on second base at the onset of the brawl, tackled Boston pitcher Bill Lee from behind. When it appeared that the dust had settled and the brawl was over, Lee confronted Nettles for tackling him from behind and said something about Nettles’s sister. The fracas resumed when Nettles swung at Lee. More players joined in the fray and Nettles broke Lee's collarbone when they went down in the pile. Despite the incident, Nettles was not suspended. For the season, he batted .254 with an AL-leading 32 home runs and 93 RBI in 158 games.

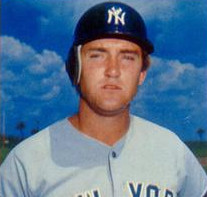
Nettles, circa 1977

Nettles enjoyed his best season in 1977, when he picked up his first of two Gold Glove Awards, and batted .255 while setting career-highs with 37 homers and 107 RBI in 158 games, helping lead the Yankees to a World Series victory over the Los Angeles Dodgers. The following season, Nettles earned his second Gold Glove to help the Yankees bring back-to-back World Series championships to the Bronx.

During Game 3 of the 1978 World Series at Yankee Stadium, with the Dodgers leading the series two games to none, Nettles made some spectacular plays at the hot corner to stop potential run-scoring hits and help the Yankees win a crucial game in the series. New York went on to win the next three contests and clinch the world championship.

In July 1980, Nettles hit his 267th career home run, the most among AL third basemen. He was limited to 89 games in 1980 because of hepatitis, which plagued him all year long.

Before the 1982 season, the Yankees named Nettles their team captain. In the fall of 1982, George Steinbrenner, the Yankees owner, stated that Nettles "is in the twilight of his career, and if he never plays another game for me, he has earned more than what I have paid him." This comment insulted Nettles and led to his growing dissatisfaction with the Yankees. The dissatisfaction continued when the Yankees acquired Toby Harrah in February 1984, intending to platoon him with Nettles at third base. In response, Nettles arrived at the Yankees' spring training camp in Florida at the very deadline for players to report. On March 30, 1984, the Yankees traded Nettles to the San Diego Padres for Dennis Rasmussen and a PTBNL. Nettles had wanted to play closer to his San Diego home, and his approval of the trade was required given his years of service.

1984 card of Nettles for San Diego Padres

Nettles famously described his career with the Yankees by stating, "[w]hen I was a little boy, I wanted to be a baseball player and join the circus. With the Yankees I have accomplished both."

Nettles was involved in the infamous 1984 "San Diego Padres–Atlanta Braves Beanball Game", while playing for the Padres during a Braves home game on August 12, 1984. Nettles charged the mound and attempted to tackle Braves relief pitcher Donnie Moore after Moore intentionally beaned Nettles. Nettles missed and then was thrown to the ground by Braves first baseman (and former longtime Yankee teammate) Chris Chambliss who then sat on him. In 1985, after teammate Eric Show surrendered Pete Rose's record-breaking 4,192nd hit, Nettles declared, "The Birch Society is going to expel Eric for making a Red famous," in reference to Show's association with the John Birch Society, a notorious anti-Communist organization.

The Padres declined to offer Nettles a contract after the 1986 season, making him a free agent. He signed with the Braves for the 1987 season as a non-roster player, making the Braves' 24-man Opening Day roster. Nettles re-signed with the Braves for the 1988 season. The Montreal Expos purchased Nettles' contract on March 24, 1988.

In his 22-season career, Nettles hit .248 with 390 home runs and 1,314 RBI in 2,700 games. He had a career fielding percentage of .964, exceptional for the hot corner (third base). After retiring at age 43, Nettles coached for the Yankees (1991) and Padres (1995).

Nettles first became eligible for the National Baseball Hall of Fame on the 1994 ballot, where he gained 8.3% of the vote. He fell to 6.1% in 1995, rose back up to 7.9% in 1996, but then fell to 4.7% in 1997 and was removed from the ballot, although it is possible he could be elected through the Veterans Committee. His 68 wins above replacement according to Baseball-Reference is the highest of all third basemen not in the Hall of Fame.

== After baseball ==
Nettles in 2007

Nettles resides in Lenoir City, Tennessee, a suburb of Knoxville. Graig and his wife Ginger have four children: Michael (deceased), Barrie, Tim, and Jeff. Jeff was selected by the Yankees in the 47th round (1,389th overall) of the 1998 Major League Baseball draft.

Nettles managed and played for the St. Lucie Legends of the Senior Professional Baseball Association in 1989. He also played for the league's Bradenton Explorers. Nettles batted .301 and played in a total of 62 games; 10 for St. Lucie and 52 for Bradenton. Nettles managed the Bakersfield Blaze of the California League in 1996 to a 39–101 record.

Nettles served as a consultant for The Bronx Is Burning, a television drama that documented the 1977 Yankees.

On March 21, 2008, Nettles announced that he had been diagnosed with prostate cancer in late November 2007 and would undergo surgery at Manhattan's Memorial Sloan–Kettering Cancer Center on April 8. His brother had been diagnosed with prostate cancer earlier in 2007.

== Legacy ==
Tommy John remembered Nettles for his great sense of humor, writing: "Graig Nettles was great with the one-liners, the zingers...He was the team's pressure valve...Every clubhouse needs a guy like that, the guy with the acerbic wit who can take your mind off a bad situation."

Nettles wrote a controversial book, Balls, a memoir of his baseball career written in collaboration with Peter Golenbock. In the book, Nettles criticized Steinbrenner and some players as well. When the book's advance promotion came to Steinbrenner's attention in March 1984, Nettles was summarily traded to his hometown San Diego Padres.

In 1991, Nettles was also inducted by the San Diego Hall of Champions into the Breitbard Hall of Fame honoring San Diego's finest athletes both on and off the playing surface.

As of 2010, Nettles holds the single-season major league record for assists by a third baseman, and is tied with Brooks Robinson for second-most all-time. His 412 assists in 1971 broke the record of 405 shared by Harlond Clift in 1937 and Robinson in 1967. In 1973, his first year as a New York Yankee, he recorded 410 assists, breaking Clete Boyer's franchise record of 396 in 1962; Robinson would tie this mark in 1974. To date, Nettles and Robinson have four of the six 400-assist seasons by a third baseman in Major League history.

Nettles is mentioned in the video for Bruce Springsteen's 1985 song "Glory Days." At the end of the video, Springsteen's character, a pitcher, tells a teen that he lost an imaginary game playing against the San Diego Padres because "Nettles got me, bottom of the ninth." (Note: In his tenure with the Padres, Nettles hit one home run in the bottom of the ninth, off Jeff Reardon, on 5/16/1986. While it was not a walk-off home run (the Padres lost the game 3-2), Nettles did hit seven walk-off home runs in his career.)

== See also ==
- List of Gold Glove Award winners at third base
- List of Major League Baseball career hits leaders
- List of Major League Baseball career home run leaders
- List of Major League Baseball career runs scored leaders
- List of Major League Baseball career runs batted in leaders
- List of Major League Baseball annual home run leaders

== Notes ==
Sporting positions
Preceded by Thurman Munson	New York Yankees team captain January 29, 1982, to March 30, 1984	Succeeded by Willie Randolph & Ron Guidry
