= Charlie Spikes =

American baseball player (born 1951)

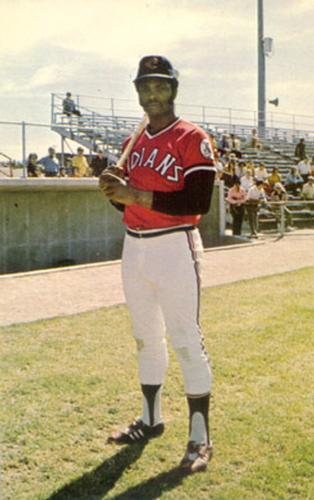
- Outfielder
- Born: January 23, 1951 (age 75); Bogalusa, Louisiana, U.S.
- Batted: Right Threw: Right

Professional debut
- MLB: September 1, 1972, for the New York Yankees
- NPB: April 4, 1981, for the Chunichi Dragons

Last appearance
- MLB: October 5, 1980, for the Atlanta Braves
- NPB: June 28, 1981, for the Chunichi Dragons

MLB statistics
- Batting average: .246
- Home runs: 65
- Runs batted in: 256

NPB statistics
- Batting average: .122
- Home runs: 1
- Runs batted in: 6
- Stats at Baseball Reference

Teams
- New York Yankees (1972); Cleveland Indians (1973–1977); Detroit Tigers (1978); Atlanta Braves (1979–1980); Chunichi Dragons (1981)

Leslie Charles Spikes (born January 23, 1951) is an American former Major League Baseball outfielder. Born in Bogalusa, Louisiana, he acquired the nickname "the Bogalusa Bomber" as a power hitting prospect in the New York Yankees organization. He was the main piece traded to the Cleveland Indians in the deal that brought Graig Nettles to the Yankees.

== Early years ==
Spikes was a standout athlete at Central Memorial High School in Bogalusa. He was a middle linebacker who had several college football scholarship offers on the table when the Yankees drafted him in the first round of the 1969 Major League Baseball draft. The Yankees gave him a $35,000 signing bonus to help him choose baseball over football.

== New York Yankees ==
After three unremarkable seasons in the Yankees' farm system, Spikes had a breakout 1972 season with the West Haven Yankees (.309/.409/.578, 26 HR, 83 RBIs) to earn a September call up to the majors from double A. He made his major league debut against the Chicago White Sox at Yankee Stadium on September 1. Leading off the second inning, he singled in his first major league at bat, and came around to score on a sacrifice fly by Gene Michael for his first major league run. In the fifth, he singled off Rich Gossage to drive in Bobby Murcer for his first major league run batted in. He also made a diving catch in the fourth to end the White Sox's only threat of the night.

Spikes went 5-for-34 with three RBIs and two runs scored in his only season in New York. At the 1972 Winter meetings, the Yankees sent Spikes, John Ellis, Jerry Kenney & Rusty Torres to the Indians for Nettles & Jerry Moses.

== Cleveland Indians ==
He began his rookie season in Cleveland in left field, however was shifted to right to make room for Walt Williams in September, and would remain there the remainder of his Indians career. His first major league home run was a three run shot off the Detroit Tigers' Tom Timmermann that carried his team to a 7-0 victory on April 15, 1973.

He led the Indians in home runs (23 & 22, respectively) and RBIs (73 & 80, respectively) each of his first two seasons in Cleveland, but would also lead the team in strikeouts both seasons (103 & 100, respectively).

On October 2, 1974, Frank Robinson was appointed player-manager of the Indians, giving him the distinction of being the first black manager in major league history. On May 4, 1975, Spikes became the first player fined by Robinson for "not thinking" and missing the cut off man.

A slow start with the bat (.178/.265/.280, 1 HR, 5 RBIs through May) led to extra batting practice and his eventual benching in early June. He became a part time player from there, as Rick Manning, George Hendrick, Oscar Gamble, John Lowenstein and he all competed for three outfield spots. He remained in a part-time role in 1976, with just three home runs on the season.

Spikes was the subject of trade rumors leading into the 1977 season. When no trade materialized, he was demoted to the triple A Toledo Mud Hens despite going 5-for-13 to start the season. Matters got worse when Mud Hens manager Jack Cassini benched Spikes for not running out a play. He slashed .293/.368/.500 with seven home runs and 31 RBIs in 49 games for Toledo when he was recalled to Cleveland when outfielder Johnny Grubb was placed on the 15 day disabled list.

He hit the ground running upon his return to the majors, going 2-for-3 with two RBIs in his first game back, and homering in consecutive games against the Boston Red Sox on July 12 & 13, Things went south from there, however, as he would bat just .169 with one home run and four RBIs over the rest of the season.

== Detroit Tigers ==
The Indians traded Spikes to the Detroit Tigers for shortstop Tom Veryzer at the Winter Meetings on December 9, 1977. Spikes was looking forward to a new start in Detroit, however, that would not materialize. Ten games into his Tigers career, Spikes injured his knee. Shortly afterwards, he was optioned to the triple A Evansville Triplets, and did not return to the majors for the rest of the season. After which, he was released by the Tigers.

== Atlanta Braves ==
Spikes made the Atlanta Braves as a non-roster Spring training invitee in 1979. He was used primarily as a pinch hitter with the Braves, and flourished in his new role. On May 19, Spikes hit a nineth inning pinch hit home run off the San Francisco Giants' Gary Lavelle, his first home run since July 31, 1977. He had a devastating collision with the Riverfront Stadium outfield wall on August 9, and had just one hit in 18 at bats for the month. Overall, he went 16-for-47 with two home runs and 13 RBIs as a pinch hitter for the season. He returned to that role again in 1980 before heading to Japan.

== Chunichi Dragons ==
Spikes signed with the Chunichi Dragons of Nippon Professional Baseball in 1981, but his stay in Japan was short. In 26 games, he batted just .122 with one home run and six RBIs.

== Career statistics ==
Games	PA	AB	Runs	Hits	2B	3B	HR	RBI	SB	BB	SO	HBP	Avg.	OBP	Slg.	Fld%
670	2232	2039	240	502	72	12	65	256	27	154	388	22	.246	.304	.389	.969

== Personal life ==
Spikes married his wife, Marsha, in 1972. They have two daughters, Kimberly & Leslie. When his playing days were done, Spikes returned to Bogalusa and began working at a textile factory. He injured his back at the factory, which led to three operations. He is currently on total disability.
