= Del Youngblood =

American college and minor league baseball coach

Truman O'Dell Youngblood (died November 13, 2014) was an American college and minor league baseball coach.

== Personal life ==
He was born in Merced, California.

== College coaching ==
He was the head coach at St. Mary's College of California in 1969 and then served as an assistant coach at University of California, Berkeley for four seasons. From 1980 to 1982, he served as the head coach of the University of Nevada, Reno baseball team. He went 65-35 in his first 100 games at the University of Nevada, the best record through that many games in school history.

He also coached women's softball at Feather River College and Kentucky Wesleyan College.

== Minor league coaching ==
In 1970, Youngblood managed the Mobridge Lakers of the Basin League, a collegiate summer baseball league. In 1974 Youngblood served as the general manager and later the field manager of the Reno Silver Sox. In 1975, he managed the San Jose Bees.
