= Tommy Smith (baseball) =

American baseball player (1948–2024)

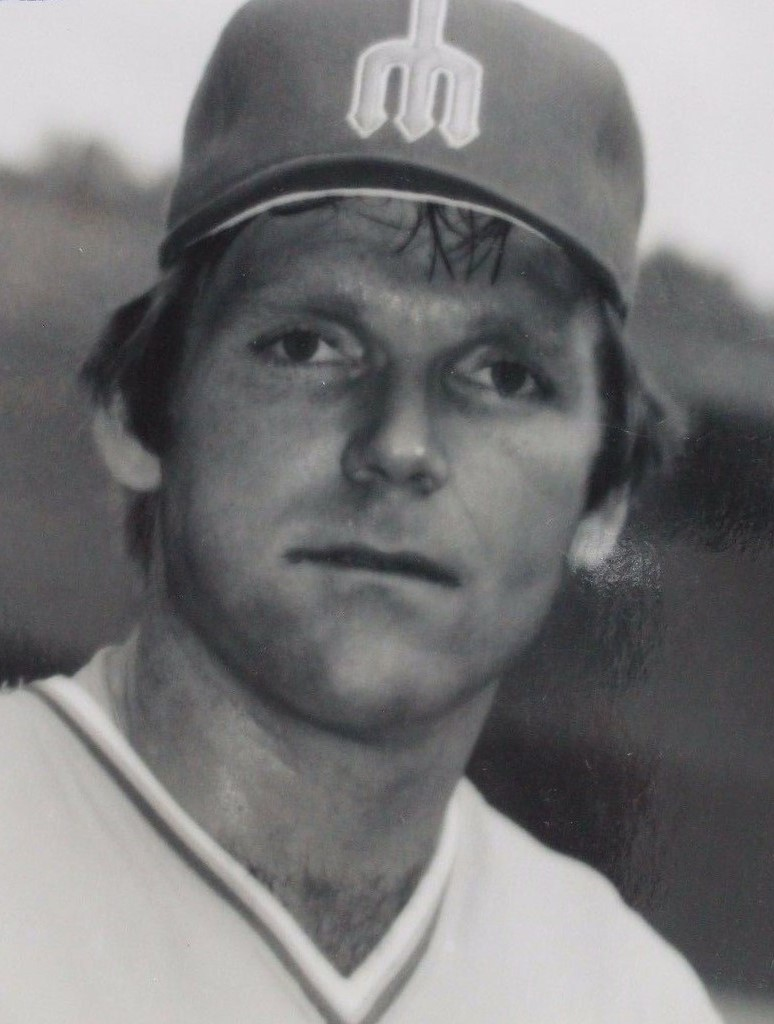
- Outfielder
- Born: August 1, 1948; Albemarle, North Carolina, U.S.
- Died: November 1, 2024 (aged 76); Wake Forest, North Carolina, U.S.
- Batted: Left Threw: Right

MLB debut
- September 6, 1973, for the Cleveland Indians

Last MLB appearance
- September 10, 1977, for the Seattle Mariners

MLB statistics
- Batting average: .232
- Home runs: 4
- Runs batted in: 21
- Stats at Baseball Reference

Teams
- Cleveland Indians (1973–1976); Seattle Mariners (1977)

Tommy Alexander Smith (August 1, 1948 – November 1, 2024) was an American Major League Baseball (MLB) outfielder. He played five seasons in the majors, four for the Cleveland Indians and one for the Seattle Mariners.

== Playing career ==
Smith attended Albemarle High School in Albemarle, North Carolina, then North Carolina State University, where he played college baseball for the Wolfpack. He was the starting pitcher in a 1968 College World Series game, losing to the USC Trojans. In 1969, he played collegiate summer baseball with the Bourne Canalmen of the Cape Cod Baseball League and was named a league all-star.

Cleveland selected Smith in the third round of the 1970 MLB draft. He spent the next several seasons in their farm system, seeing only brief stints with the major league club in each season from 1973 until 1975. He hit an inside-the-park home run for his first MLB home run on September 11, 1973. The following January, he broke an arm while playing basketball. In 1976, Smith got his first real shot at big league playing time, playing 55 games and batting .256.

Prior to the 1977 season, Smith was selected with the 58th pick of the 1976 MLB expansion draft by the Mariners. However, with the expansion team, Smith saw little time in the majors, playing in just 21 games, going 7-for-27 in his final major league season.

== Personal life and death ==
Following his playing career, Smith opened a youth baseball training facility. He also worked as a salesman.

Smith was married. He died on November 1, 2024 at the age of 76.
