= Rusty Torres =

Puerto Rican baseball player (born 1948)

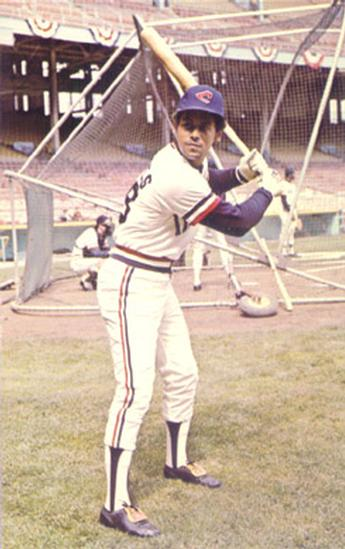
- Outfielder
- Born: September 30, 1948 (age 78); Aguadilla, Puerto Rico
- Batted: Both Threw: Right

MLB debut
- September 20, 1971, for the New York Yankees

Last MLB appearance
- August 25, 1980, for the Kansas City Royals

MLB statistics
- Batting average: .212
- Home runs: 35
- Runs batted in: 126
- Stats at Baseball Reference

Teams
- New York Yankees (1971–1972); Cleveland Indians (1973–1974); California Angels (1976–1977); Chicago White Sox (1978–1979); Kansas City Royals (1980)

Rosendo "Rusty" Torres Hernández (born September 30, 1948) is a Puerto Rican former professional baseball outfielder. He played all or part of nine seasons in Major League Baseball for five different teams. In an odd coincidence, Torres happened to be in the ballpark when forfeits were called in three different games in the 1970s.

== Early life ==
Born in Puerto Rico, Torres came to live in New York City early in life, attending Queens Vocational High School in Jamaica, Queens. He was drafted by the New York Yankees in the 54th round of the 1966 Major League Baseball draft.

== Professional career ==
=== Early minor league career ===
Torres debuted professionally in 1967 with the rookie league Johnson City Yankees, and also played for three other teams in the Yankees organization that year: the Oneonta Yankees, the Fort Lauderdale Yankees, and the Greensboro Yankees. He batted a combined .247 in 75 games.

In 1968, Torres returned to Fort Lauderdale, where he batted just .229 in 126 games. He spent his third season at class-A with the Kinston Eagles in 1969, batting .270 with 13 home runs. This performance earned Torres a promotion to Double-A.

Playing for the Manchester Yankees, he missed much of the 1970 season due to injury, appearing in just 41 games and batting .244. Still, Torres was promoted to Triple-A in 1971. Playing for the Syracuse Chiefs, Torres batted .290 with 19 home runs in 133 games, earning himself a call-up to the Yankees in September.

=== New York Yankees ===
Torres made his major league debut as a 22-year-old with the New York Yankees on September 20, 1971, recording a single in four plate appearances against Baltimore. He finished 1971 with a .385 batting average, with 10 hits in 26 at bats.

==== Forfeit #1: Senators' last game in Washington ====
On the same day as Torres's debut, the Washington Senators announced they would move to Dallas/Fort Worth for the 1972 season. After a 4-for-5 day (with his first major league home run) against Detroit on September 26, the Yankees started Torres in right field for their final three games of the season in Washington – the Senators final home stand. On the season's final day, September 30 (Torres's 23rd birthday), the Senators led 7–5 with two outs in the top of the ninth when Yankee Horace Clarke stepped to the plate, with Torres (who already had two hits including a homer) on deck. Suddenly, outraged Senators fans stormed the field, causing the game to be forfeited to New York. In a 2007 interview, Torres recalled: "Bobby Murcer hits a ground ball. He gets thrown out at first. They thought it was three outs. It was only two outs. And they rushed us! They rushed the field. They took dirt. People were taking dirt, taking the bases. They were tearing up the seats. It was unbelievable. That was a real scary experience. Thankfully, none of us got hurt."

==== 1972 ====
In 1972, Torres made the Yankees out of spring training, appearing on Opening Day as a pinch hitter. However, he hit just .211 in 175 at bats through July 22, and was demoted to Syracuse. Torres was later recalled by the Yankees on September 1, but finished the season with a .211 batting average in 199 at bats. He, along with John Ellis, Charlie Spikes and Jerry Kenney, was traded from the Yankees to the Cleveland Indians for Graig Nettles and Jerry Moses at the Winter Meetings on November 27, 1972.

=== Cleveland Indians ===
Torres was the Indians' Opening Day right fielder and leadoff hitter in 1973. He started 51 games in right field for the Indians, more than any other player. Overall, he appeared in 121 games in his first full major league season, but hit just .205. Still, his defensive skills were enough for him to claim a regular spot in the lineup of the lowly Indians.

They were not, however, enough for him to keep that spot in 1974. John Lowenstein moved into the lineup as the everyday left fielder, with Charlie Spikes moving into Torres's position in right field. With Leron Lee also joining the team, Torres became the Indians' fifth outfielder.

==== Forfeit #2: Ten Cent Beer Night ====
On June 4, the Indians held a promotion to attract fans to the park for a game against Texas: the now-infamous Ten Cent Beer Night. Torres was inserted as a pinch hitter in the ninth inning, delivering a single. Two batters later, John Lowenstein hit a sacrifice fly, tying the game at 5–5, and putting Torres in scoring position on second base representing the winning run. But with a drunk crowd, the situation finally boiled over. After Texas outfielder Jeff Burroughs violently reacted to a fan stealing his hat, hundreds of fans poured into the outfield, many of them throwing whatever they could lay their hands on, even several chairs. As a result, umpire crew chief Nestor Chylak forfeited the contest to the Rangers—the same franchise as the old Senators.

==== September trade ====
Torres hit a miserable .187 in 1974, starting just 27 games, mostly in center field. On September 12, he was traded to the California Angels in a deal that brought Frank Robinson to Cleveland. However, he did not play for the Angels during the remainder of the season.

=== California Angels ===
Torres spent the entire 1975 season in the minors. Playing for the Salt Lake City Gulls, Torres batted a minor league career best .306 in 107 games. During the following offseason, the Angels traded their starting center fielder, Mickey Rivers, to the Yankees. In return, they received right fielder Bobby Bonds. This sent their 1975 starting right fielder, Leroy Stanton, to the bench, opening up a spot for Torres.

Torres was the Angels' Opening Day center fielder that year. Overall, he appeared in 120 games for the 1976 Angels, 104 of them in center field. He had just a .205 batting average, but his several walks and decent power made him a near-league-average offensive player (98 OPS+) that year.

Once again, however, Torres could not hold onto a starting job. The Angels gave the center field job to Gil Flores in 1977. Combined with other acquisitions, Torres wound up buried deep on the bench. Despite spending the entire season in the majors, Torres totaled just 77 at bats with an anemic .156 batting average. He became a free agent at the end of the year.

=== Chicago White Sox ===
Torres was signed on March 1, 1978, by the Texas Rangers, but for the first time in three years started the season in the minor leagues, playing for the Tucson Toros. He got off to a hot start, batting .346 with 7 home runs in just 30 games. He was dealt along with Claudell Washington from the Rangers to the Chicago White Sox for Bobby Bonds on May 16. After spending a few months with the minor league Iowa Oaks, Torres earned another shot at the majors in September. In 16 games down the stretch, Torres managed to hit at a .316 clip in 44 at bats.

Torres made the White Sox Opening Day roster in 1979. He was batting .286 for the 1979 season by the morning of July 12; that night, Torres would start in right field in the first game of a doubleheader against the Detroit Tigers.

==== Forfeit #3: Disco Demolition Night ====
That night the White Sox staged the Disco Demolition Night promotion. This time Torres wasn't on the field when the madness started; the first game had ended and Torres (who had singled and scored the Sox' only run in the 4–1 loss) was in the locker room when disc jockey Steve Dahl "blew up" a box of disco records, inspiring thousands of fans to run onto the field, which was eventually cleared by police in riot gear. Tigers manager Sparky Anderson refused to field his team citing safety concerns, which resulted in the forfeiture by the White Sox to the Tigers.

=== Remaining career ===
Torres finished the 1979 season with a .253 average and a career-high eight home runs. He became a free agent again at the end of the season, re-signing with the White Sox before spring training. However, he did not make the club, and was released on April 1. A month later, on May 5, he was signed by the Kansas City Royals. He played eight games for the Omaha Royals to get in shape, then was promoted to the majors. In 51 games for the Royals, however, Torres batted just .167 without an extra base hit, and was released on August 29.

The following January, Torres signed with the Pittsburgh Pirates. He spent the entire 1981 season with their top farm club, the Portland Beavers, batting .257 with 21 home runs. However, it was not enough to get him back to the majors, and after the season he called it a career at age 33.

== Later life and sexual abuse charges ==
An excellent stickball player as a kid growing up in the Bronx, Torres was inducted into the "Stickball Hall Of Fame" in 2002. Torres was awarded with the Hispanic Heritage Baseball Museum Hall of Fame Pioneer Award in New York on June 8, 2007.

Torres later founded "Winning Beyond Winning", a group that helps prepare young athletes for a life beyond sports. "We help teach the kids how to excel in sports, but just as importantly, we tell them to make sure they get a well-rounded education."

In 2012, Torres was arrested and charged with sexually abusing some of the young players he was coaching, including an 8-year-old girl. In July 2014, he was convicted of five counts of first-degree sexual abuse, and acquitted of sexually abusing another girl. Torres was sentenced to three years in prison in December 2014.
