= Jerry Kenney =

American baseball player (born 1945)

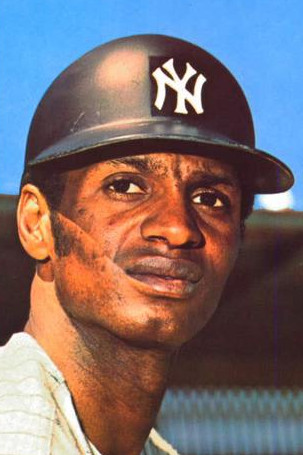
- Third baseman
- Born: June 30, 1945 (age 81); St. Louis, Missouri, U.S.
- Batted: Left Threw: Right

MLB debut
- September 5, 1967, for the New York Yankees

Last MLB appearance
- April 19, 1973, for the Cleveland Indians

MLB statistics
- Batting average: .237
- Home runs: 7
- Runs batted in: 103
- Stats at Baseball Reference

Teams
- New York Yankees (1967, 1969–1972); Cleveland Indians (1973)

Gerald Tennyson Kenney (born June 30, 1945) is an American former Major League Baseball infielder. He is from Beloit, Wisconsin.

== Baseball career ==
The second hit of his major league career was an inside-the-park home run with the New York Yankees in 1967. He played for the Yankees in 120 games or more in 1969, 1970 and 1971. He also had appearances for the Yankees in 1967 and 1972. He, along with John Ellis, Charlie Spikes and Rusty Torres, was traded from the Yankees to the Cleveland Indians for Graig Nettles and Jerry Moses at the Winter Meetings on November 27, 1972. He played five games for the Indians in his final season in 1973. He was signed by Yankees scout Lou Maguolo.
