= John Ellis (baseball) =

American baseball player (1948–2022)

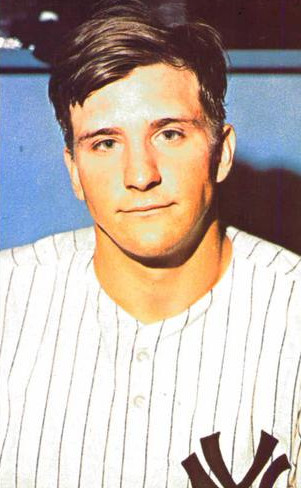
- Ellis in 1970
- First baseman / Catcher
- Born: August 21, 1948; New London, Connecticut, U.S.
- Died: April 5, 2022 (aged 73); New Haven, Connecticut, U.S.
- Batted: Right Threw: Right

MLB debut
- May 17, 1969, for the New York Yankees

Last MLB appearance
- October 3, 1981, for the Texas Rangers

MLB statistics
- Batting average: .262
- Home runs: 69
- Runs batted in: 391
- Stats at Baseball Reference

Teams
- New York Yankees (1969–1972); Cleveland Indians (1973–1975); Texas Rangers (1976–1981)

John Charles Ellis (August 21, 1948 – April 5, 2022) was an American professional baseball player who played as a first baseman and catcher in Major League Baseball from 1969 to 1981. He played for the New York Yankees, Cleveland Indians, and Texas Rangers.

== Career ==
Ellis was a standout football and baseball player at New London High School in New London, Connecticut, earning the nicknames "New London Strong Boy" and the "Moose". He signed with the New York Yankees as an undrafted free agent in 1966. After playing in the minor leagues, he made his major league debut in 1969 as an injury replacement for catcher Jake Gibbs. Ellis hit an inside-the-park home run in his major league debut. With Thurman Munson becoming the Yankees new starting catcher in 1970, the Yankees moved Ellis to first base. He batted .248 with seven home runs and 29 runs batted in (RBIs) in 78 games during the 1970 season. For the 1972 season, Ellis was Munson's backup catcher.

Ellis was traded along with Charlie Spikes, Rusty Torres, and Jerry Kenney from the Yankees to the Cleveland Indians for Graig Nettles and Jerry Moses at the Winter Meetings on November 27, 1972. He became the first designated hitter in Cleveland Indians history in 1973. Ellis had his best season in 1974, when he hit .285 with 10 home runs and 64 RBIs in 128 games. That year, Ellis caught Dick Bosman's no-hitter on July 19.

Ellis was dealt from the Indians to the Texas Rangers for Ron Pruitt and Stan Thomas at the Winter Meetings on December 9, 1975. He played for the Rangers through the 1981 season, when he batted .138 in 28 games. The Rangers released Ellis before the start of the 1982 season. He retired from baseball with a .262 batting average, 69 home runs, and 391 RBIs. When he was released, Ellis took a position as a scout for the Rangers.

== Post-playing career ==
Ellis invested in real estate as an offseason hobby. In 1977, he established his own real estate firm.

Ellis was diagnosed with Hodgkin lymphoma when he was 38 years old. He founded the Connecticut Cancer Foundation (formerly Connecticut Sports Foundation Against Cancer) with his wife Jane, which helps cancer patients financially and funds cancer research. The foundation hosts an annual charity auction event at Mohegan Sun notable attendees including Roger Clemens, Mickey Mantle, Derek Jeter, Goose Gossage, Johnny Bench, Yogi Berra, Joe DiMaggio, and other professional baseball players.

== Personal life ==
Ellis had two children, John and Erika. His son, John J. Ellis, was a baseball standout and played at the University of Maine and in the Texas Rangers system for three seasons.

Ellis died on April 5, 2022, at the Yale New Haven Health System's Smilow Cancer Hospital, after a recurrence of his cancer.
