= John Lowenstein =

American baseball player (born 1947)

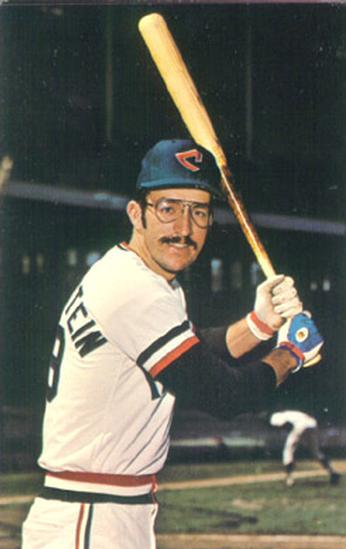
- Outfielder
- Born: January 27, 1947 (age 79); Wolf Point, Montana, U.S.
- Batted: Left Threw: Right

MLB debut
- September 2, 1970, for the Cleveland Indians

Last MLB appearance
- May 4, 1985, for the Baltimore Orioles

MLB statistics
- Batting average: .253
- Home runs: 116
- Runs batted in: 441
- Stats at Baseball Reference

Teams
- Cleveland Indians (1970–1977); Texas Rangers (1978); Baltimore Orioles (1979–1985)

Career highlights and awards
- World Series champion (1983); Baltimore Orioles Hall of Fame

John Lee Lowenstein (/ˈloʊɛnstaɪn/ LOH-en-styne; born January 27, 1947) is an American former professional baseball outfielder and designated hitter who played in Major League Baseball (MLB) for the Cleveland Indians, Texas Rangers, and Baltimore Orioles.

== Playing career ==
1979 photocard of Lowenstein for Baltimore Orioles

Lowenstein was born in Wolf Point, Montana. He attended Norte Vista High School in Riverside, California, and the University of California, Riverside where he was a three-year letterman with the Highlanders between 1966 and 1968. As an All-American in his senior year, he led the team in seven offensive categories including batting average (.393) and on-base and slugging percentages (.488 and .600 respectively). He was the first person in UC Riverside history to both receive an athletic scholarship and be selected in the MLB draft, 401st overall in the 18th round by the Cleveland Indians in 1968. He was inducted into the UC Riverside Athletics Hall of Fame in 1989.

Although he never played in a major league game for them, Lowenstein was briefly a member of the expansion Toronto Blue Jays between the 1976 and 1977 seasons. He was traded by the Indians to the Blue Jays for designated hitter Rico Carty, and reacquired in the same off-season for utility infielder Héctor Torres.

Lowenstein is known for being part of a left-field platoon during the late 1970s and early 1980s with Gary Roenicke for the Baltimore Orioles. He had been claimed off waivers by the Orioles from the Rangers on November 27, 1978.

Lowenstein hit an extra inning walk-off home run for the Baltimore Orioles to win Game 1 of the 1979 American League playoffs against the California Angels. He also made a spectacular, off-the-wall catch to rob the Phillies' Bo Diaz of a home-run in Game One of the 1983 World Series and hit a home run for the Orioles in Game 2. Lowenstein and the Orioles won the World Series that year, four games to one.

=== Eccentricities ===
While with the Indians in 1974, he started the John Lowenstein Apathy Club as opposed to having a fan club. He explained, "The people who start fan clubs do it for a publicity gimmick, and I don't care for it. I've turned down about a half dozen fan clubs already. They're a big hassle."

Lowenstein was taken off the field on a stretcher in the seventh inning of a 4–3 Orioles win over the Oakland Athletics at Memorial Stadium on June 19, 1980. While sliding into second base in an attempt to extend a game-tying single, he was accidentally hit on the back of his head by a ball thrown by first baseman Jeff Newman who was the cut-off man on the play. As he reached the dugout, the seemingly unconscious Lowenstein abruptly sat up and pumped his fists in a victory salute to the crowd. He explained, "It was simply an opportunity I could not pass up."

== Broadcaster ==
Lowenstein was an announcer for Oriole television broadcasts on Home Team Sports for eleven seasons, working as an analyst with Mel Proctor. After he was told before the 1996 season he would not be retained, Lowenstein speculated the Orioles put pressure on Home Team Sports to remove him from the booth.

In 1986, Lowenstein served as a backup color commentator (behind Joe Garagiola and Tony Kubek) on NBC's Game of the Week broadcasts alongside play-by-play man Ted Robinson; Lowenstein and Robinson called the May 17 game between Kansas City and the Chicago White Sox.
