= Walt Williams (baseball) =

American baseball player (1943–2016)

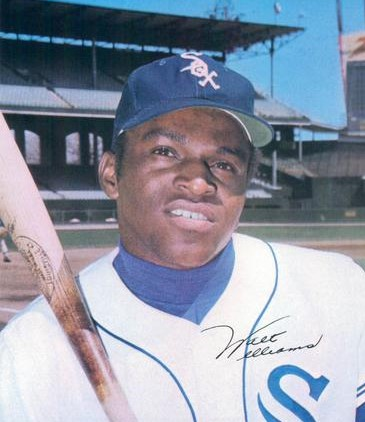
- Outfielder
- Born: December 19, 1943; Brownwood, Texas, U.S.
- Died: January 23, 2016 (aged 72); Abilene, Texas, U.S.
- Batted: Right Threw: Right

Professional debut
- MLB: April 21, 1964, for the Houston Colt .45's
- NPB: April 3, 1976, for the Nippon-Ham Fighters

Last appearance
- MLB: September 22, 1975, for the New York Yankees
- NPB: September 25, 1977, for the Nippon-Ham Fighters

MLB statistics
- Batting average: .270
- Home runs: 33
- Runs batted in: 173
- Stats at Baseball Reference

Teams
- Houston Colt .45's (1964); Chicago White Sox (1967–1972); Cleveland Indians (1973); New York Yankees (1974–1975); Nippon-Ham Fighters (1976–1977)

Walter Allen Williams (December 19, 1943 – January 23, 2016) was an American professional baseball player and coach. He played in Major League Baseball and the Nippon Professional Baseball league as an outfielder between 1964 and 1977, most prominently as a member of the Chicago White Sox where he established himself as a fan favorite for his enthusiastic playing style. He also played for the Houston Colt .45s, Cleveland Indians and the New York Yankees before playing for two seasons in the Nippon Professional Baseball league with the Nippon-Ham Fighters.

== Early life ==
Born in Brownwood, Texas, Williams was nicknamed No-Neck due to his relatively short stature (5 feet 6 inches) combined with a muscular, compact torso and a short neck. His odd physical appearance was the result of a typhus injection he received as a baby. After Williams' hometown was hit by a flood, the government gave typhus injections to prevent the spread of the disease. Williams was so muscular even as a baby that medical personnel were unable to reach a vein, except in the back of his neck. He developed a crick in his neck, which then stiffened and shrank. Williams was sent in adolescence to live with an aunt in San Francisco, where he graduated from Galileo High School having played football, basketball and baseball for the school teams.

== Baseball career ==
Williams was signed by the Houston Colt .45's as an amateur free agent in 1963. After spending one season in the minor leagues, he made his major league debut at the age of 20 with the Colt .45's on April 21, 1964. Williams played in only 10 games with the Colt .45's, when he was selected off waivers on May 26, 1964 by the St. Louis Cardinals.

Williams was sent back to the minor leagues to play for the Winnipeg Goldeyes of the Northern League, where he posted a .318 batting average in 88 games. He progressed to the Tulsa Oilers in 1965 where, he scored 106 runs and hit .330 to win the Texas League batting championship. In 1966, Williams repeated his performance with a batting average of .330 and scored 107 runs. On December 14, 1966, he was traded by the St. Louis Cardinals with Don Dennis to the Chicago White Sox for Lee White and Johnny Romano.

Williams returned to the major leagues in 1967 during an era dominated by pitching. He hit for a .240 batting average in 1967, in a year in which only four players hit above .300. Led by manager Eddie Stanky, the 1967 White Sox were in a tight pennant race with the Boston Red Sox, Detroit Tigers and the Minnesota Twins before fading to a fourth-place finish. Williams' hustling style of play became evident during a June 14 game against the Red Sox. With a baserunner on second base, Williams fielded a single to right field and threw the ball to home plate. First baseman Tom McCraw intercepted the throw then, trapped the hitter in a rundown as he had strayed too far from first base. Shortstop Ron Hansen's return throw to first base was wide and the ball rolled towards the Red Sox dugout. Appearing seemingly from out of nowhere, Williams dived for the ball before it reached the dugout then, he sprang to his feet and threw it to second base where Hansen tagged the baserunner out. With his cheerful demeanor and hustling style of play, Williams became a fan-favorite during his tenure with the White Sox.

In 1968, he split his playing time between the Hawaii Islanders of the Pacific Coast League where he hit for a .318 average and, the White Sox where, he hit for only a .241 average in 63 games. Carl Yastrzemski would be the only player in the American League to break the .300 mark in 1968. Williams had a breakout season in 1969 when he became the White Sox' starting right fielder and, produced a career-high .304 batting average to finish sixth in the American League batting championship and scored 59 runs. He was one of only six American League players to have a batting average above the .300 mark and, the first White Sox player in six seasons to hit above 300. Williams struck out only 33 times and grounded into just 5 double plays during the 1969 season. Williams was the fifth-toughest to strike out in the league; he was fanned only once every 14.3 at bats.

After the 1969 season, he became embroiled in a contract dispute with White Sox General Manager, Ed Short, who told Williams if he refused the team's salary offer, he wouldn't get the chance to play regularly. Williams' batting average would drop to .251 in 110 games in 1970. Short was fired in 1971 and Williams rebounded to lead the White Sox with a .294 average and a career-high .344 on-base percentage. When the White Sox acquired first baseman Dick Allen in 1972, they moved former first baseman Carlos May to left field, leaving Williams to battle for the final two outfield positions with Rick Reichardt, Pat Kelly, Jay Johnstone and Jim Lyttle. He appeared in only 77 games, posting a .249 batting average as the White Sox battled for the American League West Division lead before finishing the season in second place, five and a half games behind the eventual world champions, the Oakland Athletics.

During his off-season, Williams volunteered his time to talk to children who were first time drug offenders as part of the Cook County drug abuse prevention program. On October 19, 1972, Williams was traded to the Cleveland Indians for Eddie Leon. In January 1973, Williams' two-year-old son died from spinal meningitis while he was playing in the Venezuelan Winter League for the Águilas del Zulia.

He became a utility player and occasional designated hitter for the Indians in 1973, producing a .284 batting average with career-highs in home runs (8) and runs batted in (38). On August 21, 1973, Williams broke up a bid for a no-hit game by former teammate Stan Bahnsen when he hit a single with two outs in the ninth inning.

On March 19, 1974, Williams was traded to the New York Yankees as part of a three-team trade. He continued his role as a utility player and designated hitter with the Yankees but, only produced a .113 batting average in 43 games. He recovered in 1975 with a .281 batting average in 82 games, helping the Yankees take first place in the American League East Division in late June before the team faded to third place at the end of the year.

After being released by the Yankees on January 27, 1976, Williams played in Japan for the Nippon-Ham Fighters from 1976 to 1977. He then played in the Mexican League from 1978 to 1979, playing in his final professional game at the age of 35. In 1989, he played for the St. Lucie Legends of the Senior Professional Baseball Association.

== Career statistics ==
In a 10-year major league career, Williams played in 842 games, accumulating 640 hits in 2,373 at bats for a .270 career batting average along with 33 home runs, 173 runs batted in and an on-base percentage of .310. Williams was a good defensive outfielder, committed 19 errors in 565 games for a fielding percentage of .981. He played the entire 1971 season without committing an error, compiling a 1.000 fielding percentage.

== Minor league managing career ==
After retiring as a player, Williams worked as the sports director of the Brownwood Community Center in his hometown. He then served as the White Sox first base coach during the 1988 season. In 1992, Williams became the manager of the Gastonia Rangers in the South Atlantic League. In 1993 and 1994 he managed the Charleston RiverDogs. His managing record over three seasons was 187 wins and 228 losses. Williams also managed the Altoona Rail Kings of the Heartland League in 1997, winning 36 games and losing 36.

== Personal life ==
Williams' nephew, Derwin Williams, played in the National Football League. Williams' grandnephew, Mason Williams, played in MLB from 2015 to 2021. Williams died after a heart attack on January 23, 2016, in Abilene, Texas.
