= Mike Kekich =

American baseball player (born 1945)

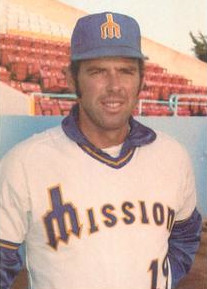
- Kekich in 1978
- Pitcher
- Born: April 2, 1945 (age 81); San Diego, California, U.S.
- Batted: Right Threw: Left

Professional debut
- MLB: June 9, 1965, for the Los Angeles Dodgers
- NPB: July 7, 1974, for the Nippon-Ham Fighters

Last appearance
- NPB: September 28, 1974, for the Nippon-Ham Fighters
- MLB: October 1, 1977, for the Seattle Mariners

MLB statistics
- Win–loss record: 39–51
- Earned run average: 4.59
- Strikeouts: 497

NPB statistics
- Win–loss record: 5–11
- Earned run average: 4.12
- Strikeouts: 90
- Stats at Baseball Reference

Teams
- Los Angeles Dodgers (1965, 1968); New York Yankees (1969–1973); Cleveland Indians (1973); Nippon-Ham Fighters (1974); Texas Rangers (1975); Seattle Mariners (1977)

Michael Dennis Kekich (born April 2, 1945) is an American former professional baseball pitcher in Major League Baseball who played for the Los Angeles Dodgers, New York Yankees, Cleveland Indians, Texas Rangers and Seattle Mariners in parts of nine seasons spanning 1965–1977. In 1974, he played in Japan for the Nippon-Ham Fighters.

== Career ==
Kekich was a left-handed pitcher who began his career as a starter during his time with the Dodgers and Yankees, but later moved to the bullpen as a reliever. He had a modestly successful career in the major leagues, but he is best remembered for trading families with fellow Yankees pitcher Fritz Peterson before the 1973 season. Peterson later married Kekich's former wife, Susanne, while Kekich soon broke up with Peterson's former wife. Shortly after, Kekich was traded to the Cleveland Indians.

Kekich signed with the Texas Rangers in 1974, pitching with them in the majors in 1975, then with the Seattle Mariners in April 1977, pitching in the expansion team's inaugural season to end his major league career.

After his big league career ended, Kekich attempted a comeback in the Mexican League, pitching there in 1979 and 1980, but did not return to affiliated baseball.

Kekich is remarried and currently resides near Albuquerque, New Mexico.
