= Jim Perry (baseball) =

American baseball player (born 1935)

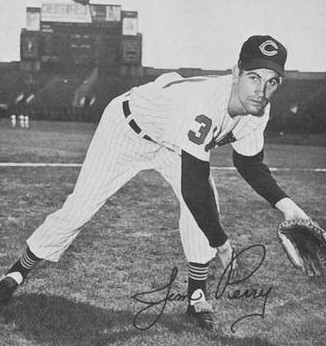
- Pitcher
- Born: October 30, 1935 (age 91); Williamston, North Carolina, U.S.
- Batted: Switch Threw: Right

MLB debut
- April 23, 1959, for the Cleveland Indians

Last MLB appearance
- August 5, 1975, for the Oakland Athletics

MLB statistics
- Win–loss record: 215–174
- Earned run average: 3.45
- Strikeouts: 1,576
- Stats at Baseball Reference

Teams
- Cleveland Indians (1959–1963); Minnesota Twins (1963–1972); Detroit Tigers (1973); Cleveland Indians (1974–1975); Oakland Athletics (1975)

Career highlights and awards
- 3× All-Star (1961, 1970, 1971); AL Cy Young Award (1970); 2× AL wins leader (1960, 1970); Minnesota Twins Hall of Fame

James Evan Perry Jr. (born October 30, 1935) is an American former professional baseball pitcher. He pitched in Major League Baseball (MLB) from 1959 to 1975 for the Cleveland Indians, Minnesota Twins, Detroit Tigers, and Oakland Athletics. During a 17-year baseball career, Perry compiled 215 wins, 1,576 strikeouts, and a 3.45 earned run average. He won the Cy Young Award in 1970 and was a three-time MLB All-Star. He and his younger brother Gaylord Perry, who were Cleveland teammates in 1974–1975, became the first brothers to both win 200 games in the major leagues, and remain the only brothers to both win Cy Young Awards.

== Career ==
Perry was born in Williamston, North Carolina and attended Williamston High School. In 1955, he helped the Williamston baseball team win the North Carolina Class A state championship.

Following high school, he attended Campbell University, until being signed by the Indians in 1956. He is the older brother of Hall of Fame pitcher Gaylord Perry. The Perry brothers trail only the Niekro brothers (Phil and Joe) for career victories by brothers. In 1959, Jim Perry came in 2nd to Bob Allison in the Rookie of the Year vote. Perry followed up with an 18-win season in 1960.

Perry was a three-time All-Star and won the 1970 AL Cy Young Award, when he posted a record of 24–12. Jim and Gaylord Perry are the only brothers in Major League history to both win Cy Young Awards. He also won 20 games in 1969, and won at least 17 games five times. As a batter, Perry was a switch-hitter and posted a respectable .199 batting average with 5 home runs and 59 RBI in his career. On July 3, 1973, brothers Gaylord Perry (Indians) and Jim Perry (Tigers) pitched against each other for the only regular season game in their careers. Neither finished the game, but Gaylord was charged with the 5–4 loss. Two Norm Cash home runs helped Detroit.

He was the opposing pitcher in three no-hitters, a feat not matched until Zach Plesac, who did so in a single season in 2021.

He is currently tied with Stan Coveleski for 84th on the all-time win list.

== Retirement ==
Following his final year with Oakland, Perry retired to his North Carolina home where he keeps busy with charitable events, especially golf tournaments. His son, Chris, is a professional golfer who has won a tournament on the PGA Tour.

He was selected for membership in Omicron Delta Kappa in 1978 at Campbell University.

On June 11, 2011, Perry was inducted into the Twins Hall of Fame in a ceremony prior to a Twins home game and attended by current members including Rod Carew, Bert Blyleven, Rick Aguilera, Gary Gaetti, Tom Kelly, Jim Rantz, and Tony Oliva.

On November 11, 2012, Campbell University announced that their renovated baseball stadium would be renamed Jim Perry Stadium. Perry attended Campbell University from 1956 to 1959.

== See also ==
- List of Major League Baseball career wins leaders
- List of Major League Baseball annual wins leaders
