= Ed Farmer =

American baseball player (1949–2020)

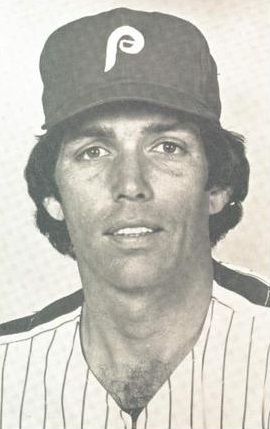
- Farmer with the Philadelphia Phillies in 1982
- Pitcher
- Born: October 18, 1949; Evergreen Park, Illinois, U.S.
- Died: April 1, 2020 (aged 70); Los Angeles, California, U.S.
- Batted: Right Threw: Right

MLB debut
- June 9, 1971, for the Cleveland Indians

Last MLB appearance
- October 2, 1983, for the Oakland Athletics

MLB statistics
- Win–loss record: 30–43
- Earned run average: 4.30
- Strikeouts: 395
- Saves: 75
- Stats at Baseball Reference

Teams
- Cleveland Indians (1971–1973); Detroit Tigers (1973); Philadelphia Phillies (1974); Baltimore Orioles (1977); Milwaukee Brewers (1978); Texas Rangers (1979); Chicago White Sox (1979–1981); Philadelphia Phillies (1982–1983); Oakland Athletics (1983)

Career highlights and awards
- All-Star (1980)

Edward Joseph Farmer (October 18, 1949 – April 1, 2020) was an American professional baseball pitcher, who played in Major League Baseball (MLB) for eight different teams, predominantly in the American League, between 1971 and 1983. The team he played the most games for was the Chicago White Sox, including one All-Star Game appearance. After his retirement as a player, he spent nearly 30 years as a White Sox radio broadcaster.

== Baseball career ==
Farmer had limited success during the first part of his career; however, his fortunes changed dramatically following a mid-career injury. He re-invented himself while toiling for three-plus years, spent mostly in the minor leagues. This led to his best seasons, 1979 to 1981 with the Chicago White Sox, during which he recorded 54 of his 75 career saves. Farmer started only 21 games in his career; his other 349 appearances were out of the bullpen. In 370 total MLB games, his career statistics include a 30–43 record, with a 4.30 earned run average (ERA), 395 strikeouts, and 624 innings pitched.

=== Early career ===
Farmer was a 1967 graduate of St. Rita High School on the southwest side of Chicago. He was drafted by the Cleveland Indians in the fifth round of the 1967 MLB draft, and played in their farm system from 1967 into the 1973 season, while making 105 major league appearances with the Indians during parts of the 1971–1973 seasons. He also briefly played for Chicago State University after high school.

In June 1973, Farmer was traded to the Detroit Tigers, in exchange for pitcher Tom Timmermann and infielder Kevin Collins. He made 24 appearances for Detroit through the end of the 1973 season.

In March 1974, Farmer was part of a multi-team trade that sent him to the New York Yankees; they then sold his contract to the Philadelphia Phillies, before he played a game for them. Farmer later stated it was because he had refused a minor league assignment with the Yankees. He appeared in 14 games for Philadelphia through the end of the 1974 season. After the season, the Phillies traded him to the Milwaukee Brewers. During the 1975 season, Farmer was limited to 14 appearances for the Brewers' Triple-A affiliate, then was released by the team in April 1976. He did not play professionally during the 1976 season, due to surgery to remove a bone spur in his right shoulder.

To this point in his career, Farmer had appeared in 143 MLB games, registering a 12–12 record, with a 5.05 ERA, 14 saves, and 139 strikeouts, in 233 1/3 innings pitched.

Farmer was with the Baltimore Orioles from March 1977 to March 1978, making just one MLB appearance for the team while otherwise pitching in Triple-A. The Brewers signed Farmer in April 1978 for his second stint with the franchise. Making just three MLB appearance for them during the 1978 season, he again mainly pitched in Triple-A. After the season, the Brewers traded Farmer and first baseman Gary Holle to the Texas Rangers in exchange for pitcher Reggie Cleveland.

Farmer made 11 MLB appearances for the Rangers during the first half of the 1979 season. A notable feud started between Farmer and outfielder Al Cowens — then with the Kansas City Royals — early in the season. On May 8, a Farmer pitch thrown in the top of the fifth inning fractured Cowens' jaw and broke several teeth, causing him to miss 21 games. Farmer later said that Cowens had attempted to steal signs from the catcher and thought the pitch would be a breaking ball away, but it was actually an inside fastball. At the start of the same game, Farmer had also hit Royals second baseman Frank White and broke his wrist, which kept him sidelined for a month.

=== White Sox years ===
The White Sox acquired Farmer and Holle from the Rangers on June 15, 1979, in exchange for third baseman Eric Soderholm. Farmer responded by recording 14 saves for the Sox, 13 of them coming after the All-Star break.

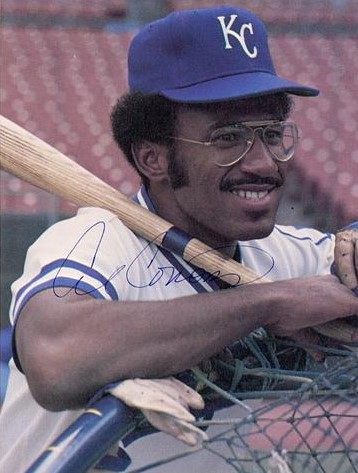
Al Cowens with the Kansas City Royals

The next season, on June 20‚ 1980, Farmer and Cowens faced each other again; Farmer now with the White Sox and Cowens now with the Tigers. In a game at Comiskey Park, with Farmer pitching, Cowens hit a ground ball to shortstop. While Farmer watched his infielders make the play, Cowens ran to the mound rather than first base, and tackled the pitcher from behind, landing several punches before the benches cleared and the two were separated. American League president Lee MacPhail suspended Cowens for seven games, and Farmer filed a criminal complaint, resulting in a warrant being issued for Cowens in Illinois. Later, Farmer agreed to drop the charges in exchange for a handshake‚ and the two players brought out the lineup cards before a game in Detroit on September 1, and shook hands. A later appearance by Cowens at Comiskey Park was greeted by fans with a "Coward Cowens" banner.

In 1980, Farmer was selected to play in the All-Star Game at Dodger Stadium. He faced three batters, recording the final two outs of the sixth inning when he got Pete Rose to ground into a double play. Farmer compiled 18 saves prior to the break, and finished the season with career highs in saves (30) and wins (7). He took the White Sox to arbitration in 1981, asking for $495,000 while the team offered $300,000. The arbitrator picked Farmer's number. Jim Palmer cited this as an example of the reason for rising salaries in the major leagues: "Since the owners kept paying more and more to mediocre players, the averages kept going up and the arbitrators looked at the averages and usually went with the player's number, which raised the average some more." After spending the 1981 season with the White Sox, registering three wins and 10 saves, Farmer became a free agent in November 1981. In his three seasons with the White Sox, Farmer appeared in 148 games and notched 54 saves while striking out 144 batters in 233 2/3 innings pitched, with a 3.31 ERA.

=== Late career ===
The Phillies signed Farmer in January 1982, for his second stint with the team. After pitching in 47 MLB games for them in 1982 and 12 games in 1983, the club released him in August 1983. Shortly thereafter, he signed with the Oakland Athletics, appearing in five games for them late in the 1983 season, his last MLB appearances. Oakland released Farmer in March 1984. He finished his career in the minor leagues with Oakland in 1984, with the unaffiliated Class A Miami Marlins of the Florida State League in 1985, and with the Pittsburgh Pirates' Triple-A team in 1986.

== Post-playing career ==
Ed Farmer
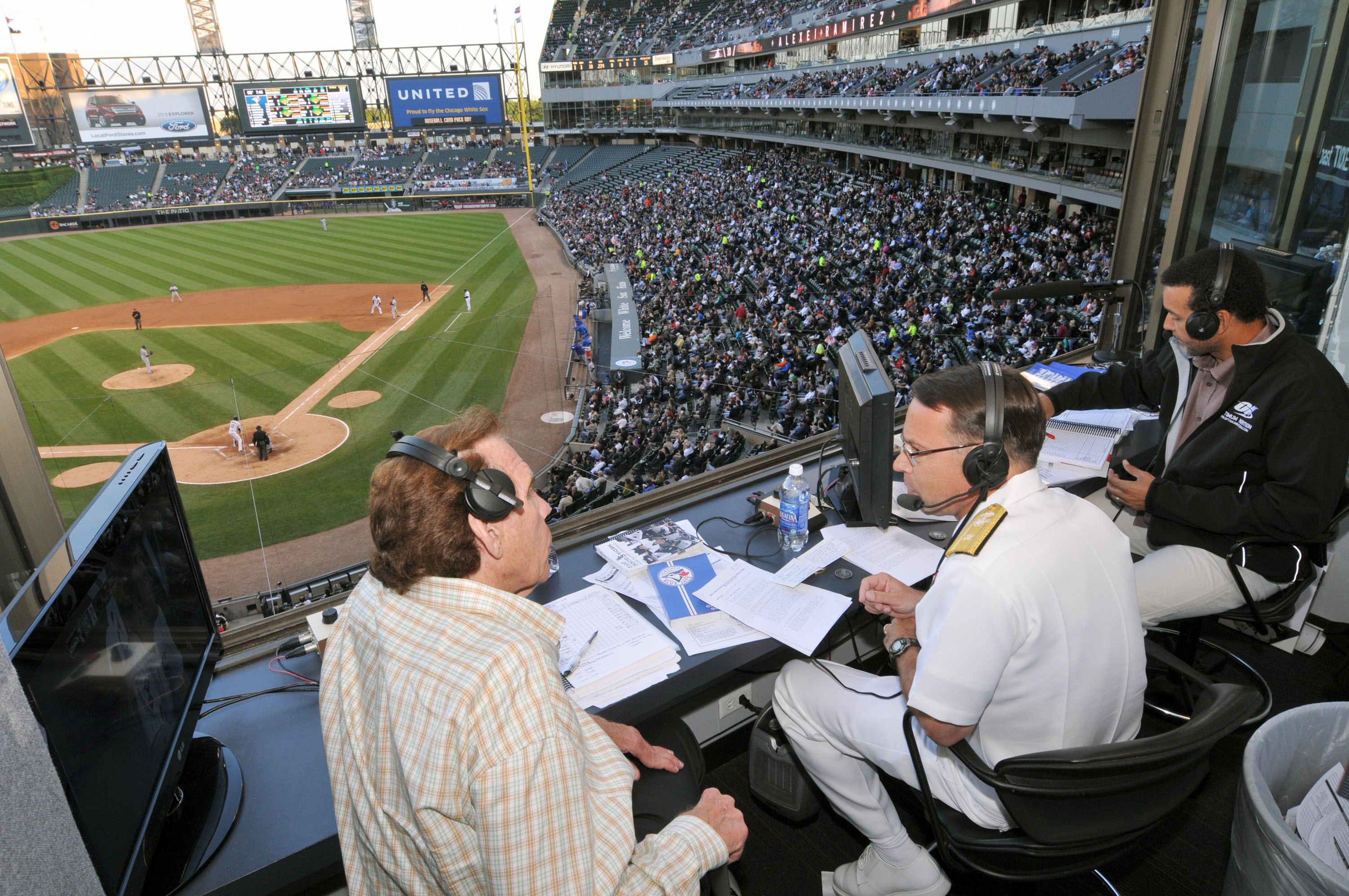
- Farmer (left) in the broadcast booth in 2012.
- Years active: 1991–2019
- Sports commentary career
- Team: Chicago White Sox
- Genre(s): Color commentator (1991–2005); Play-by-play (2006–2019)
- Sport: Major League Baseball
- Employer: Chicago White Sox Radio Network

Farmer was a scout in the Orioles organization between 1988 and 1990, and briefly had a White Sox front office role.

In 1991, Farmer took a part-time role on White Sox radio broadcasts, then was a full-time color commentator from 1992 to 2005. He became well known among fans by the nickname "Farmio". In 2006, he took over play-by-play from John Rooney, and served in that role through the 2019 season, with broadcast partners Chris Singleton (2006–2007), Steve Stone (2008), and Darrin Jackson (2009–2019). Farmer served a total of 29 seasons as a White Sox broadcaster; 28 of them full-time, and 14 giving play-by-play.

During his life, Farmer suffered with polycystic kidney disease, that forced him to get a kidney transplant in 1991. He additionally advocated for people with kidney diseases. He was the board director of the Polycystic Kidney Disease Research Foundation, and he spoke to the U.S. House of Representatives in 1995 about polycystic kidney disease. Alongside Jesse White, Farmer contributed to the development of the Illinois' organ donation program.

He died on April 1, 2020, at the age of 70 from idiopathic cardiomyopathy, a heart disorder. His final broadcast had been a Cactus League game during White Sox spring training in February 2020.
