= 1972 Detroit Tigers season =

Major League Baseball season

1972 Detroit Tigers
- American League East Division champion
- League: American League
- Division: East
- Ballpark: Tiger Stadium
- City: Detroit, Michigan
- Owners: John Fetzer
- General managers: Jim Campbell
- Managers: Billy Martin
- Television: WJBK (George Kell, Larry Osterman)
- Radio: WJR (Ernie Harwell, Ray Lane)

The 1972 Detroit Tigers season was the team's 72nd season and the 61st season at Tiger Stadium. The Tigers won the American League East championship with a record of 86–70 (.551), finishing one-half game ahead of the Boston Red Sox. They played one more game than the Red Sox due to a scheduling quirk caused by the 1972 Major League Baseball strike—a game which turned out to allow them to win the division. They lost the 1972 American League Championship Series to the Oakland A's three games to two.

Mickey Lolich recorded 376 innings pitched (IP), surpassing Bob Feller's 1946 live-ball era record of 371 1/3. The following season, Wilbur Wood of the Chicago White Sox set a new record with 376 2/3 IP.

== Offseason ==
- January 12: Tigers owner John Fetzer announced plans to build a $126 million domed stadium on the Detroit riverfront. Lawsuits‚ a failed bond issue‚ and the construction of the Pontiac Silverdome eventually killed the idea.
- April 5: The Major League Baseball season was delayed due to a players' strike. A total of 86 games were lost to the strike.

=== Notable transactions ===
- March 24, 1972: César Gutiérrez was purchased from the Tigers by the Montreal Expos.

== Regular season ==
=== Season standings ===
AL East
Team	W	L	Pct.	GB	Home	Road
Detroit Tigers	86	70	.551	—	44‍–‍34	42‍–‍36
Boston Red Sox	85	70	.548	½	52‍–‍26	33‍–‍44
Baltimore Orioles	80	74	.519	5	38‍–‍39	42‍–‍35
New York Yankees	79	76	.510	6½	46‍–‍31	33‍–‍45
Cleveland Indians	72	84	.462	14	43‍–‍34	29‍–‍50
Milwaukee Brewers	65	91	.417	21	37‍–‍42	28‍–‍49

=== Record vs. opponents ===
1972 American League records Sources:
Team	BAL	BOS	CAL	CWS	CLE	DET	KC	MIL	MIN	NYY	OAK	TEX
Baltimore	—	7–11	6–6	8–4	8–10	10–8	6–6	10–5	6–6	7–6	6–6	6–6
Boston	11–7	—	8–4	6–6	8–7	5–9	6–6	11–7	4–8	9–9	9–3	8–4
California	6–6	4–8	—	7–11	8–4	5–7	9–6	7–5	7–8	4–8	8–10	10–7
Chicago	4–8	6–6	11–7	—	8–4	5–7	8–9	9–3	8–6	7–5	7–8	14–4
Cleveland	10–8	7–8	4–8	4–8	—	10–8	6–6	5–10	8–4	7–11	2–10	9–3
Detroit	8–10	9–5	7–5	7–5	8–10	—	7–5	10–8	9–3	7–9	4–8	10–2
Kansas City	6–6	6–6	6–9	9–8	6–6	5–7	—	7–5	9–9	7–5	7–11	8–6
Milwaukee	5–10	7–11	5–7	3–9	10–5	8–10	5–7	—	4–8	9–9	4–8	5–7
Minnesota	6–6	8–4	8–7	6–8	4–8	3–9	9–9	8–4	—	6–6	8–9	11–7
New York	6–7	9–9	8–4	5–7	11–7	9–7	5–7	9–9	6–6	—	3–9	8–4
Oakland	6–6	3–9	10–8	8–7	10–2	8–4	11–7	8–4	9–8	9–3	—	11–4
Texas	6–6	4–8	7–10	4–14	3–9	2–10	6–8	7–5	7–11	4–8	4–11	—

=== Season summary ===
After having a losing record in 1970, the Tigers were reinvigorated in 1971 and 1972 by their fiery manager, Billy Martin.

The 1972 Tigers were an aging team whose best hitters (Al Kaline and Norm Cash) were both 37 years old. Together with the late-season acquisition of 38-year-old slugger Frank Howard, this led to a group of Tigers batters who were past their prime, and the team finished the year with an anemic .237 batting average—seventh in the AL. Light-hitting third baseman Aurelio Rodríguez led the team with 142 hits, and the 37-year-olds Kaline and Cash led the way in batting average (Kaline hit .313), RBIs (Cash had 61), and home runs (Cash had 22).

The strength of the 1972 team was pitching. The team's ace, Mickey Lolich, won 22 games, struck out 250 batters (2nd best in the AL), and had a 2.50 ERA. Joe Coleman had 19 wins and 222 strikeouts, and the early August acquisition of Woodie Fryman proved to be a key element in a tight pennant race. Between August 1 and 17, the Tigers went 5–12, and three of the team's wins were by Fryman. Excluding Fryman's wins, the Tigers were 2–12 in the first half of August. In the final two months of the season, Fryman had a 10–3 record with a 2.06 ERA (Adjusted ERA+ of 154).

Defense also played an important role in the team's success. Rodríguez led AL third basemen with 150 putouts and 348 assists, and shortstop Ed Brinkman won the Gold Glove award and led AL shortstops with a .990 fielding percentage (33 points above the league average). Brinkman set a record going 72 games and 331 total chances without an error from late May through early August. Despite a .205 batting average, Brinkman won the "Tiger of the Year" award from the Detroit baseball writers and finished ninth in the American League MVP voting.

The 1972 Tigers outscored their opponents 558 to 514. The pennant race came down to the final series, a matchup between the first place Red Sox and the second place Tigers. The Tigers won two of three games and finished a half game ahead of the Red Sox. (Because of cancellation of games missed during the early-season strike, the Tigers were scheduled for one game more than the Red Sox.)

Detroit's attendance total of 1,892,386 was tops among the twelve American League teams and second in the majors behind the New York Mets.

=== Season highlights ===
- April 15: On Opening Day in Detroit, the Tigers beat the Red Sox, 3–2. Mickey Lolich got the win, and Ed Brinkman hit a two-run home run for the Tigers.
- April 20: The Tigers lost to the Orioles, 1–0, despite a two-hitter by Detroit pitchers Tom Timmermann and Chuck Seelbach. Paul Blair hit a solo home run for the game's only score.
- April 25: Mickey Lolich held the Rangers to four hits, as the Tigers won, 4–1. Second baseman Tony Taylor hit a two-run triple in the second inning.
- April 28: Tom Timmermann held the White Sox to three hits and no runs, as the Tigers won, 12–0. Ed Brinkman went 3-for-4 with two doubles and four RBIs, and Norm Cash went 3-for-5 with a home run and four RBIs. Having scored more than eight runs for the first time of the season, the Tigers would not do so again until August 12.
- April 29: The Tigers beat the White Sox, 6–1, as Mickey Lolich struck out nine batters for his third win. Mickey Stanley, Bill Freehan, and Willie Horton all hit home runs.
- May 17: Tom Haller hit a three-run home run in a 6–1 Detroit victory over Baltimore. Mickey Lolich held the Orioles to four hits and struck out seven for his seventh win.
- May 21: Mickey Lolich shut out the Indians, 5–0, and struck out seven for his eighth win. Mickey Stanley hit a two-run triple to break a scoreless tie in the sixth inning, and Norm Cash added a home run.
- May 27: Surprise hitting star Ed Brinkman had an RBI single and scored the game's only other run, as Detroit beat the Yankees, 2–1. Joe Coleman got the win to extend his record to 7–2.
- June 16: Joe Coleman struck out ten as the Tigers beat the Angels, 3–0. Mickey Stanley and Dick McAuliffe both hit home runs.
- June 18: Norm Cash and Jim Northrup hit solo home runs to help Mickey Lolich win his eleventh game. Lolich struck out eight and pitched a complete-game shutout, 2–0, over the Angels.
- June 24: The Tigers beat the Orioles, 2–1, in 12 innings. The game was a pitching duel between Joe Coleman and Mike Cuellar. Coleman struck out eleven and held the Orioles to four hits through eleven innings. Ed Brinkman hit a sacrifice fly in the 12th inning, and Norm Cash scored the winning run. Future Tiger Doyle Alexander took the loss for Baltimore.
- June 26: Pitcher Bill Slayback made his major league debut for the Tigers and allowed no hits through seven innings against the Yankees. Johnny Callison broke up the no-hitter with a single in the eighth inning, but the Tigers hung on to win, 4–3.
- June 27: Aurelio Rodríguez‚ Al Kaline‚ and Willie Horton hit back-to-back-to-back home runs in the first-inning. Mickey Lolich, pitching on two days' rest, won his 12th game, 5–2.
- July 1: The Tigers beat the Orioles, 2–0, in a pitching duel between Dave McNally and Mickey Lolich. Al Kaline won the game with a home run off McNally.
- July 6: Joe Coleman won his tenth game and shut out the Royals, 7–0. Ed Brinkman hit an RBI single and walked with the bases loaded for a second RBI, and Bill Freehan hit a two-run double in the sixth inning.
- July 8: Eighteen months after suffering a heart attack, Detroit reliever John Hiller returned to the mound in a 5–2 loss to the White Sox.
- July 16: Bill Slayback pitched a five-hit shutout as the Tigers beat the Royals, 2–0. Norm Cash and Aurelio Rodríguez both hit home runs.
- July 20: Slayback struck out 13 batters and allowed 5 hits in a 5–1 victory over the Rangers.
- July 21: Mickey Lolich won his 17th game, a 3–1 victory over the Rangers. Dick McAuliffe and Norm Cash homered for Detroit.
- July 22: The Tigers beat the Rangers, 6–2, as Joe Coleman won his 12th game. At the All-Star break, Lolich had 17 wins, and Coleman had 12.
- July 25: Mickey Lolich held the National League to one hit and no runs in the fourth and fifth innings of the All-Star Game. Bill Freehan caught the first five innings and scored in the third inning. When Lolich and Freehan left the game at the end of the fifth inning, the American League was ahead, 1–0.
- July 31: The Tigers beat the Red Sox, 5–2, as Mickey Lolich won his 18th game, and Aurelio Rodríguez and Bill Freehan hit home runs. After a tremendous start, Lolich won only one game between July 31 and September 6.
- August 1: The Tigers lost to the Brewers, 9–0, in a six-inning game called due to rain. As rain threatened to end the game before it became official, Detroit manager Billy Martin employed stall tactics, and umpire Frank Umont recommended a $1,000 fine for Martin.
- August 4: The Tigers claimed catcher Duke Sims off waivers from the Dodgers. Over the last two months of the season, Sims hit .316 with four home runs and 19 RBIs and played in four of five games of the 1972 American League Championship Series.
- August 5: Detroit shortstop Ed Brinkman committed an error, ending his major league record streak of 72 games and 331 total chances without an error.
- August 9: The Tigers beat the Yankees, 6–0, behind the shutout pitching of newly acquired starter Woodie Fryman. Fryman held the Yankees to six hits in nine innings. Aurelio Rodríguez went 3-for-5 with 3 RBIs, and Gates Brown went 2-for-2 with two RBIs.
- August 13: The Tigers beat the Indians, 3–2, behind the second straight strong pitching performance by Woodie Fryman. With the Tigers in a skid through the first half of August, manager Billy Martin picked his starting lineup out of a hat in an attempt to halt the Tigers' skid. As a result of Martin's unusual tactic, Norm Cash hit in the leadoff spot, and shortstop Ed Brinkman hit in the cleanup spot.
- August 17: Woodie Fryman pitched his third straight complete game victory since joining the Tigers at the beginning of August.
- August 18: The Tigers beat the Angels, 2–0, as Mickey Lolich won his 19th game. It was Lolich's only win in the month of August. Nolan Ryan was the losing pitcher for the Angels.
- August 20: The Tigers beat the Angels, 11–9. After the Angels scored nine runs in the fourth inning, Detroit scored eight runs in the sixth inning. Aurelio Rodríguez had a double and a three-run home run in the Tigers' big inning.
- August 27: Joe Coleman pitched an eleven-inning complete-game shutout, as the Tigers beat the Twins, 1–0. Aurelio Rodríguez hit a home run in the 11th inning for the win. This was the third consecutive game in which the Tigers won with 11th-inning home runs. Rodriguez hit one to start the streak, and Willie Horton hit one in the middle game.
- August 31: The Tigers acquired 36-year-old slugger Frank Howard from the Texas Rangers. Howard had seven RBIs in 14 games for the Tigers in 1972.
- September 6: In a matchup between the AL's best starting pitchers, Mickey Lolich got his 20th win over Jim Palmer and the Orioles, 4–3. Lolich had failed in five prior starts to win his 20th.
- September 8: Woodie Fryman continued his hot pitching, holding the Orioles to two hits and one run, while striking out eight batters. The Tigers won, 2–1. Gates Brown hit a first-inning home run off Pat Dobson, and Ed Brinkman added a run-scoring double in the seventh.
- September 12: The Tigers beat the Orioles, 3–2, as Woodie Fryman won his sixth game since joining the team in August.
- September 16: The Tigers beat the Brewers, 2–1, as Woodie Fryman won his seventh game. Ed Brinkman had the game-winning RBI with a single in the fourth inning.
- September 20: Woodie Fryman won his eighth game as the Tigers beat the Indians, 4–1.
- September 21–24: The Tigers and the Red Sox split a four-game series as the two teams battled for the lead in the American League East. In the opener, the Tigers won, 10–3, to move the Tigers into a tie for the lead in the AL East. Joe Coleman struck out 10 and had three RBIs.
- September 27: Trailing 5–1 to the Yankees‚ the Tigers scored three runs in the eighth inning and two more in the ninth to beat the Yankees and keep their pennant hopes alive.
- September 28: The Tigers lost to the Yankees, 3–2. Roy White hit a home run in the 12th inning to win it for New York.
- September 29 – October 1: The Tigers swept the Brewers in a three-game series in Detroit, to keep the Tigers in a tight pennant race with the Red Sox. In the first game, the Tigers scored 12 runs, as Ed Brinkman hit a three-run home run in the first inning, and Al Kaline went 4-for-5 with a home run, a double, two runs, and two RBIs. In the third game, John Hiller pitched a complete game five-hitter against for his first win since suffering a heart attack in 1970.
- October 2: The Tigers and Red Sox started a three-game series in Detroit with Boston ahead by a half game. In the first game, Mickey Lolich struck out 15 Red Sox batters. Detroit won, 4–1, in front of a crowd of 51,518 at Tiger Stadium. Al Kaline and Aurelio Rodríguez both hit home runs, and the Tigers moved ahead of the Red Sox by a half game.
- October 3: The Tigers clinched the American League East championship as they beat the Red Sox, 3–1, in front of another sell-out crowd at Tiger Stadium. Woodie Fryman got the win, compiling a 10–3 record after joining the Tigers in early August. Boston's only run was unearned on a fielding error by Dick McAuliffe. In the bottom of the seventh inning, Al Kaline hit an RBI single to tie the score, 1–1. Bill "Spaceman" Lee pitched in relief of Luis Tiant, and Al Kaline scored on a fielding error by Carl Yastrzemski. Rookie Chuck Seelbach pitched a 1–2–3 ninth inning for the save. The game ended on a fly ball hit by future Tiger Ben Oglivie that was caught by Al Kaline in right field.
- October 4: In the final game of the regular season, Joe Coleman had a chance to win his 20th game, but the Red Sox beat the Tigers, 4–1.

=== Notable transactions ===
- June 6, 1972: Jerry Manuel was drafted by the Tigers in the 1st round (20th pick) of the 1972 Major League Baseball draft.
- August 2, 1972: Woodie Fryman was claimed by the Tigers off waivers from the Philadelphia Phillies.
- August 31, 1972: Frank Howard was purchased by the Tigers from the Texas Rangers.

=== Roster ===
1972 Detroit Tigers
Roster
Pitchers: 38 Les Cain; 15 Joe Coleman; 45 Jim Foor; 38 Woodie Fryman; 36 Bill Gilbreth; 18 John Hiller; 35 Mike Kilkenny; 30 Lerrin LaGrow; 48 Don Leshnock; 29 Mickey Lolich; 47 Phil Meeler; 19 Joe Niekro; 16 Ron Perranoski; 39 Fred Scherman; 37 Chuck Seelbach; 44 Bill Slayback; 46 Bob Strampe; 28 Tom Timmermann; 35 Chris Zachary	Catchers: 11 Bill Freehan; 14 Tom Haller; 33 Gene Lamont; 12 Duke Sims; Infielders: 8 Ed Brinkman; 25 Norm Cash; 40 John Gamble; 33 Frank Howard; 31 Paul Jata; 7 John Knox; 3 Dick McAuliffe; 4 Aurelio Rodríguez; 42 Joe Staton; 10 Tony Taylor	Outfielders: 22 Ike Blessitt; 26 Gates Brown; 9 Ike Brown; 42 Wayne Comer; 23 Willie Horton; 6 Al Kaline; 43 Marvin Lane; 5 Jim Northrup; 24 Mickey Stanley; Other batters: 2 Dalton Jones	Manager: 1 Billy Martin; Coaches: 50 Art Fowler; 51 Joe Schultz; 52 Charlie Silvera; 53 Dick Tracewski

== Player stats ==
=== Batting ===
==== Starters by position ====
Note: Pos = Position; G = Games played; AB = At bats; H = Hits; Avg. = Batting average; HR = Home runs; RBI = Runs batted in

Pos	Player	G	AB	H	Avg.	HR	RBI
C	Bill Freehan	111	374	98	.262	10	56
1B	Norm Cash	137	440	114	.259	22	61
2B	Dick McAuliffe	122	408	98	.240	8	30
3B	Aurelio Rodríguez	153	601	142	.236	13	56
SS	Ed Brinkman	156	516	105	.203	6	49
LF	Willie Horton	108	333	77	.231	11	36
CF	Mickey Stanley	142	435	102	.234	14	55
RF	Al Kaline	106	278	87	.313	10	32

==== Other batters ====
Note: G = Games played; AB = At bats; H = Hits; Avg. = Batting average; HR = Home runs; RBI = Runs batted in

Player	G	AB	H	Avg.	HR	RBI
Jim Northrup	134	426	111	.261	8	42
Gates Brown	103	252	58	.230	10	31
Tony Taylor	78	228	69	.303	1	20
Tom Haller	59	121	25	.207	2	13
Duke Sims	38	98	31	.316	4	19
Ike Brown	51	84	21	.250	2	10
Paul Jata	32	74	17	.230	0	3
Frank Howard	14	33	8	.242	1	7
John Knox	14	13	1	.077	0	0
Wayne Comer	27	9	1	.111	0	1
Dalton Jones	7	7	0	.000	0	0
Marvin Lane	8	6	0	.000	0	0
Ike Blessitt	4	5	0	.000	0	0
John Gamble	6	3	0	.000	0	0
Joe Staton	6	2	0	.000	0	0
Gene Lamont	1	0	0	----	0	0

Note: pitchers' batting statistics not included

=== Pitching ===
==== Starting pitchers ====
Note: G = Games; IP = Innings pitched; W = Wins; L = Losses; ERA = Earned run average; SO = Strikeouts

Player	G	IP	W	L	ERA	SO
Mickey Lolich	41	327.1	22	14	2.50	250
Joe Coleman	40	280.0	19	14	2.80	222
Woodie Fryman	16	113.2	10	3	2.06	72
Les Cain	5	23.2	0	3	3.80	16
Fred Holdsworth	2	7.0	0	1	12.86	5

==== Other pitchers ====
Note: G = Games; IP = Innings pitched; W = Wins; L = Losses; ERA = Earned run average; SO = Strikeouts

Player	G	IP	W	L	ERA	SO
Tom Timmermann	34	149.2	8	10	2.89	88
Bill Slayback	23	81.2	5	6	3.20	65
Joe Niekro	18	47.0	3	2	3.83	24

==== Relief pitchers ====
Note: G = Games pitched; W= Wins; L= Losses; SV = Saves; GF = Games finished; ERA = Earned run average; SO = Strikeouts

Player	G	W	L	SV	GF	ERA	SO
Chuck Seelbach	61	9	8	14	34	2.89	76
Fred Scherman	57	7	3	12	27	3.64	53
Chris Zachary	25	1	1	1	9	1.41	21
John Hiller	24	1	2	3	8	2.03	26
Ron Perranoski	17	0	1	0	5	7.71	10
Lerrin LaGrow	16	0	1	2	6	1.32	9
Jim Foor	7	1	0	0	1	14.73	2
Phil Meeler	7	0	1	0	2	4.32	5
Bob Strampe	7	0	0	0	4	11.57	4
Bill Gilbreth	2	0	0	0	0	16.20	2
Don Leshnock	1	0	0	0	1	0.00	2
Mike Kilkenny	1	0	0	0	1	9.00	0

== Awards and honors ==
- Ed Brinkman, Rawlings Gold Glove Award for shortstop

=== All-Stars ===
1972 Major League Baseball All-Star Game

- Bill Freehan, starter, catcher
- Joe Coleman, reserve
- Mickey Lolich, reserve
- Norm Cash, reserve

=== League top ten finishers ===
Ed Brinkman

- Led AL shortstops in fielding percentage (.990)
- Led MLB in games played (156)

Joe Coleman

- #3 in AL in sacrifice hits (15)
- #5 in AL in strikeouts per 9 innings pitched (7.14)
- #4 in AL in home runs allowed (23)
- #2 in AL in bases on balls allowed (110)

Woodie Fryman

- Led AL in winning percentage (.769)

Fred Holdsworth

- Youngest player in AL (20)

Al Kaline

- 4th oldest player in AL (37)

Mickey Lolich

- Led the AL in home runs allowed (29)
- #2 in the AL in strikeouts (250)
- #3 in the AL in wins (22)
- #3 in AL in innings pitched (327-1/3)
- #2 in MLB in games started (41)
- #2 in the AL in complete games (23)
- #2 in MLB in hits allowed (282)
- #2 in AL in strikeout to walk ratio (3.38)
- #3 in MLB in hit batsmen (11)
- #3 in AL in batters faced (1321)

Aurelio Rodríguez

- Led AL third basemen in putouts (150)
- Led AL third basemen in assists (348)
- #4 in AL in game played (153)
- #3 in AL in at bats (601)
- #3 in AL in outs (484)

Chuck Seelbach

- #7 in AL in games as pitcher (61)

Mickey Stanley

- #2 in AL in sacrifice flies (8)

=== Players ranking among top 100 all time at position ===
The following members of the 1972 Tigers have been ranked among the Top 100 of all time at their position in The New Bill James Historical Baseball Abstract in 2001:

- Bill Freehan: 12th best catcher of all time
- Norm Cash: 20th best first baseman of all time
- Dick McAuliffe: 22nd best second baseman of all time
- Aurelio Rodríguez: 91st best third baseman of all time
- Willie Horton: 55th best left fielder of all time
- Al Kaline: 11th best right fielder of all time
- Mickey Lolich: 72nd best pitcher of all time

== Postseason ==
=== American League Championship Series ===
The Tigers lost to the Oakland Athletics in the 1972 American League Championship Series, losing three games to two. The A's were 93–62 in the regular season and went on to beat the Cincinnati Reds in the 1972 World Series.

==== Game 1 ====
October 7, 1972, at Oakland–Alameda County Coliseum

Team	1	2	3	4	5	6	7	8	9	10	11	R	H	E
Detroit	0	1	0	0	0	0	0	0	0	0	1	2	6	2
Oakland	0	0	1	0	0	0	0	0	0	0	2	3	10	1
W: Rollie Fingers (1–0) L: Mickey Lolich (0–1)
HR: DET – Norm Cash (1), Al Kaline (1)

Game 1 was a pitching duel with 20-game winners, Mickey Lolich (22–14) and Catfish Hunter (21–7). Norm Cash hit a solo home run in the second inning to put the Tigers ahead, but the A's struck back in the third inning as Bert Campaneris walked, moved to third on a single, and scored on a sacrifice fly by Joe Rudi. The score remained tied, 1–1, through ten innings. In the top of the 11th inning, Al Kaline hit a solo home run off Rollie Fingers to put Detroit ahead. After Sal Bando and Mike Epstein singled to open the bottom of the 11th, Chuck Seelbach came on in relief of Lolich who had pitched 10 innings. Gonzalo Márquez singled to right, driving in two runs to give the A's the win in Game 1.

==== Game 2 ====
October 8, 1972, at Oakland–Alameda County Coliseum

Team	1	2	3	4	5	6	7	8	9	R	H	E
Detroit	0	0	0	0	0	0	0	0	0	0	3	1
Oakland	1	0	0	0	4	0	0	0	X	5	8	0
W: Blue Moon Odom (1–0) L: Woodie Fryman (0–1)
HR: None

Game 2 was a lopsided 5–0 win for the A's, as Blue Moon Odom (15–6) pitched a complete-game shutout and held the Tigers to three hits. Woodie Fryman (10–3), who had been virtually unhittable in August and September, gave up four runs in 4 1/3 innings. Bert Campaneris singled in the first inning, stole second and third on successive pitches, and then scored on a single by Joe Rudi. Campaneris singled again in the third inning, and singled and scored again in the firth inning. When Campaneris came to bat in the seventh inning, Lerrin LaGrow's first pitch hit Campaneris in the ankle. Campaneris staggered for a moment, glared at LaGrow and then flung his bat toward the mound. The bat spiraled at LaGrow five feet off the ground, but LaGrow ducked, and the bat narrowly missed LaGrow, landing a few feet behind the mound. A bench-clearing brawl ensued, and Tigers manager Billy Martin had to be restrained by umpires and teammates to prevent him from going after Campaneris. Both LaGrow and Campaneris were suspended for the rest of the ALCS.

==== Game 3 ====
October 10, 1972, at Tiger Stadium

Team	1	2	3	4	5	6	7	8	9	R	H	E
Oakland	0	0	0	0	0	0	0	0	0	0	7	0
Detroit	0	0	0	2	0	0	0	1	X	3	8	1
W: Joe Coleman (1–0) L: Ken Holtzman (0–1)
HR: DET – Bill Freehan (1)

The Series moved to Detroit for the final three games. In Game 3, Joe Coleman (19–14) pitched a complete-game shutout and set an ALCS record by striking out 14 A's batters. The Tigers won, 3–0, as Ike Brown hit a single in the 4th inning that drove in Al Kaline and Bill Freehan. Freehan also hit a home run in the 8th inning to complete the scoring. Ken Holtzman (19–11) was the losing pitcher for the A's.

==== Game 4 ====
October 11, 1972, at Tiger Stadium

Team	1	2	3	4	5	6	7	8	9	10	R	H	E
Oakland	0	0	0	0	0	0	1	0	0	2	3	9	2
Detroit	0	0	1	0	0	0	0	0	0	3	4	10	1
W: John Hiller (1–0) L: Bob Locker (0–1)
HR: OAK – Mike Epstein (1) DET – Dick McAuliffe (1)

Game 4 was the most exciting game of the Series and was rated by The Sporting News as one of the five greatest games ever played at Tiger Stadium. The game featured a rematch of Game 1 – Mickey Lolich for Detroit and Catfish Hunter for Oakland. Detroit took the lead in the 3rd inning on a solo home run by Dick McAuliffe, and Lolich held the A's scoreless through six innings. The A's tied the game, 1–1, on a Mike Epstein home run in the 7th inning, and the game went into extra innings with the score tied, 1–1. In the top of the 10th inning, Chuck Seelbach replaced Lolich and gave up two runs. With the Tigers on the verge of elimination, the Tigers staged a dramatic comeback in the bottom of the 10th inning. Dick McAuliffe and Al Kaline opened the inning with singles, and Gates Brown walked to load the bases with nobody out. Bill Freehan bounced a double play ball to third, but Sal Bando's throw to second baseman Gene Tenace was dropped, allowing McAuliffe to score. Norm Cash walked, and Kaline scored to tie the game at 3–3. Jim Northrup ended it with a walk-off game-winning single, as Gates Brown scored the winning run.

==== Game 5 ====
October 12, 1972, at Tiger Stadium

Team	1	2	3	4	5	6	7	8	9	R	H	E
Oakland	0	1	0	1	0	0	0	0	0	2	4	0
Detroit	1	0	0	0	0	0	0	0	0	1	5	2
W: Blue Moon Odom (2–0) L: Woodie Fryman (0–2) S: Vida Blue (1)
HR: None

The decisive Game 5 was another pitching duel between Blue Moon Odom and Woodie Fryman. Both teams combined for only nine hits, and the only extra-base hit was a double by Odom. The Tigers scored first in the bottom of the first inning, as Dick McAuliffe singled, moved to second on a walk, moved to third on a passed ball, and scored on a groundball by Bill Freehan. The A's tied in the top of the second inning, as Reggie Jackson walked, stole second base, advanced to third on a fly ball, and then stole home. In the fourth inning, George Hendrick reached base on a controversial throwing error (umpire John Rice ruled that first baseman Norm Cash had pulled his foot off the bag but replays showed otherwise). He advanced to second on a bunt, and scored on a Gene Tenace single to left field. Neither team scored a run after the top of the fourth, and the A's won the game, 2–1. In the 9th inning, Norm Cash singled, but pinch hitter Mickey Stanley hit into a fielder's choice and Tony Taylor hit a fly ball to center for the final out. Odom and Vida Blue combined to hold the Tigers to five hits. Despite allowing only one earned run, Fryman took the loss.

=== Postseason player stats ===
==== Batting ====
Note: G = Games played; AB = At bats; H = Hits; Avg. = Batting average; HR = Home runs; RBI = Runs batted in

Player	G	AB	H	Avg.	HR	RBI
Norm Cash	5	16	4	.250	1	2
Willie Horton	5	10	1	.100	0	0
Al Kaline	5	19	5	.263	1	1
Dick McAuliffe	5	20	4	.200	1	1
Jim Northrup	5	15	5	.333	0	1
Aurelio Rodríguez	5	16	0	.000	0	0
Duke Sims	4	15	3	.200	0	0
Tony Taylor	4	15	2	.133	0	0
Bill Freehan	3	12	3	.250	1	3

==== Pitching ====
Note: G = Games pitched; IP = Innings pitched; W = Wins; L = Losses; ERA = Earned run average; SO = Strikeouts

Player	G	IP	W	L	ERA	SO
Mickey Lolich	2	19.0	0	1	1.42	9
Woodie Fryman	2	12.1	0	2	3.65	8
Joe Coleman	1	9.0	1	0	0.00	14
John Hiller	3	3.1	1	0	0.00	1
Lerrin LaGrow	1	1.0	0	0	0.00	1
Chuck Seelbach	2	1.0	0	0	18.00	0
Fred Scherman	1	0.2	0	0	0.00	1
Chris Zachary	1	0.0	0	0	inf	0

== Farm system ==
Level	Team	League	Manager
AAA	Toledo Mud Hens	International League	Johnny Lipon
AA	Montgomery Rebels	Southern League	Fred Hatfield
A	Rocky Mount Leafs	Carolina League	Len Okrie
A	Lakeland Tigers	Florida State League	Stubby Overmire
A	Clinton Pilots	Midwest League	Jim Leyland
Rookie	Bristol Tigers	Appalachian League	Joe Lewis

LEAGUE CHAMPIONS: Montgomery, Bristol

== See also ==
- 1972 in Michigan
