= 1974 Detroit Tigers season =

Major League Baseball season

1974 Detroit Tigers
- League: American League
- Division: East
- Ballpark: Tiger Stadium
- City: Detroit, Michigan
- Owners: John Fetzer
- General managers: Jim Campbell
- Managers: Ralph Houk
- Television: WJBK (George Kell, Larry Osterman)
- Radio: WJR (Ernie Harwell, Paul Carey)

The 1974 Detroit Tigers season was the team's 74th season and the 63rd season at Tiger Stadium. The Tigers compiled a record of 72–90. They finished in last place in the American League East, 19 games behind the Baltimore Orioles. They were outscored by their opponents 768 to 620.

== Offseason ==
- October 25, 1973: Frank Howard was released by the Tigers.
- December 3, 1973: Tony Taylor was released by the Tigers.
- March 19, 1974: The Tigers traded Ed Farmer to the New York Yankees and Jim Perry to the Cleveland Indians as part of a three-team trade. The Yankees sent Jerry Moses to the Tigers. The Indians sent Walt Williams and Rick Sawyer to the Yankees.

== Regular season ==
1974 was Al Kaline's final season after 22 years as a Tiger (1953–1974). He became the 12th player to join the 3,000 hit club on September 24.

On September 7, the Yankees' Graig Nettles hit a home run against the Tigers. The next time up, he hit a broken-bat single. Tigers catcher Bill Freehan scrambled for the six superballs that came bouncing out. Nettles was called out on the single, but his solo homer was allowed and the made all the difference as the Yankees won 1–0.

=== Season standings ===
AL East
Team	W	L	Pct.	GB	Home	Road
Baltimore Orioles	91	71	.562	—	46‍–‍35	45‍–‍36
New York Yankees	89	73	.549	2	47‍–‍34	42‍–‍39
Boston Red Sox	84	78	.519	7	46‍–‍35	38‍–‍43
Cleveland Indians	77	85	.475	14	40‍–‍41	37‍–‍44
Milwaukee Brewers	76	86	.469	15	40‍–‍41	36‍–‍45
Detroit Tigers	72	90	.444	19	36‍–‍45	36‍–‍45

=== Record vs. opponents ===
1974 American League record Sources:
Team	BAL	BOS	CAL	CWS	CLE	DET	KC	MIL	MIN	NYY	OAK	TEX
Baltimore	—	10–8	7–5	5–7	12–6	14–4	8–4	8–10	6–6	11–7	6–6	4–8
Boston	8–10	—	4–8	8–4	9–9	11–7	4–8	10–8	6–6	11–7	8–4	5–7
California	5–7	8–4	—	10–8–1	3–9	5–7	8–10	3–9	8–10	3–9	6–12	9–9
Chicago	7–5	4–8	8–10–1	—	8–4	7–5	11–7	8–4	7–11–1	4–8	7–11	9–7–1
Cleveland	6–12	9–9	9–3	4–8	—	9–9	8–4	10–8	6–6	7–11	5–7	4–8
Detroit	4–14	7–11	7–5	5–7	9–9	—	7–5	9–9	3–9	11–7	5–7	5–7
Kansas City	4–8	8–4	10–8	7–11	4–8	5–7	—	11–1	8–10	4–8	8–10	8–10
Milwaukee	10–8	8–10	9–3	4–8	8–10	9–9	1–11	—	6–6	9–9	5–7	7–5
Minnesota	6–6	6–6	10–8	11–7–1	6–6	9–3	10–8	6–6	—	4–8	5–13	9–9
New York	7–11	7–11	9–3	8–4	11–7	7–11	8–4	9–9	8–4	—	7–5	8–4
Oakland	6–6	4–8	12–6	11–7	7–5	7–5	10–8	7–5	13–5	5–7	—	8–10
Texas	8–4	7–5	9–9	7–9–1	8–4	7–5	10–8	5–7	9–9	4–8	10–8	—

=== Notable transactions ===
- June 10, 1974: Tim Corcoran was signed as an amateur free agent by the Tigers.

==== Draft picks ====
- June 5, 1974: 1974 Major League Baseball draft
  - Mark Fidrych was drafted by the Tigers in the 10th round.
  - Rob Picciolo was drafted by the Tigers in the 1st round (6th pick) of the secondary phase, but did not sign.

=== Roster ===
1974 Detroit Tigers
Roster
Pitchers: 15 Joe Coleman; 38 Woodie Fryman; 18 John Hiller; 20 Fred Holdsworth; 30 Lerrin LaGrow; 19 Dave Lemanczyk; 29 Mickey Lolich; 36 Jim Ray; 31 Vern Ruhle; 37 Chuck Seelbach; 14 Bill Slayback; 17 Luke Walker	Catchers: 10 Gene Lamont; 12 Jerry Moses; 45 John Wockenfuss; Infielders: 8 Ed Brinkman; 9 Ike Brown; 25 Norm Cash; 40 Ron Cash; 11 Bill Freehan; 2 John Knox; 4 Aurelio Rodríguez; 43 Reggie Sanders; 3 Gary Sutherland; 7 Tom Veryzer	Outfielders: 23 Willie Horton; 21 Marvin Lane; 42 Ron LeFlore; 25 Dan Meyer; 28 Jim Nettles; 5 Jim Northrup; 22 Ben Oglivie; 44 Leon Roberts; 27 Dick Sharon; 24 Mickey Stanley; Other batters: 26 Gates Brown; 6 Al Kaline	Manager: 35 Ralph Houk; Coaches: 52 Cot Deal (Pitching); 50 Jim Hegan (Bullpen); 51 Joe Schultz (Third base); 53 Dick Tracewski {First base)

== Player stats ==
=== Batting ===
==== Starters by position ====
Note: Pos = Position; G = Games played; AB = At bats; H = Hits; Avg. = Batting average; HR = Home runs; RBI = Runs batted in

Pos	Player	G	AB	H	Avg.	HR	RBI
C	Jerry Moses	74	198	47	.237	4	19
1B	Bill Freehan	130	445	132	.297	18	60
2B	Gary Sutherland	149	619	157	.254	5	49
3B	Aurelio Rodríguez	159	571	127	.222	5	49
SS	Ed Brinkman	153	502	111	.221	14	54
LF	Willie Horton	72	238	71	.298	15	47
CF	Mickey Stanley	99	394	87	.221	8	34
RF	Jim Northrup	97	376	89	.237	11	42
DH	Al Kaline	147	558	146	.262	13	64

==== Other batters ====
Note: G = Games played; AB = At bats; H = Hits; Avg. = Batting average; HR = Home runs; RBI = Runs batted in

Player	G	AB	H	Avg.	HR	RBI
Ron LeFlore	59	254	66	.260	2	13
Ben Oglivie	92	252	68	.270	4	29
Norm Cash	53	149	34	.228	7	12
Jim Nettles	43	141	32	.227	6	17
Dick Sharon	60	129	28	.217	2	10
Marvin Lane	50	103	24	.233	2	9
Gates Brown	73	99	24	.242	4	17
Reggie Sanders	26	99	27	.273	3	10
Gene Lamont	60	92	20	.217	3	8
John Knox	55	88	27	.307	0	6
Leon Roberts	17	63	17	.270	0	7
Ron Cash	20	62	14	.226	0	5
Tom Veryzer	22	55	13	.236	2	9
Dan Meyer	13	50	10	.200	3	7
John Wockenfuss	13	29	4	.138	0	2
Ike Brown	2	2	0	.000	0	0

=== Pitching ===
==== Starting pitchers ====
Note: G = Games; IP = Innings pitched; W = Wins; L = Losses; ERA = Earned run average; SO = Strikeouts

Player	G	IP	W	L	ERA	SO
Mickey Lolich	41	308.0	16	21	4.15	202
Joe Coleman	41	285.2	14	12	4.32	177
Lerrin LaGrow	37	216.1	8	19	4.66	85
Woodie Fryman	27	141.2	6	9	4.32	92

==== Other pitchers ====
Note: G = Games pitched; IP = Innings pitched; W = Wins; L = Losses; ERA = Earned run average; SO = Strikeouts

Player	G	IP	W	L	ERA	SO
Luke Walker	28	92.0	5	5	4.99	52
Bill Slayback	16	54.2	1	3	4.77	23
Fred Holdsworth	8	35.2	0	3	4.29	16
Vern Ruhle	5	33.0	2	0	2.73	10

==== Relief pitchers ====
Note: G = Games pitched; W= Wins; L= Losses; SV = Saves; GF = Games Finished; ERA = Earned run average; SO = Strikeouts

Player	G	W	L	SV	GF	ERA	SO
John Hiller	59	17	14	13	52	2.64	134
Jim Ray	28	1	3	2	19	4.47	26
Dave Lemanczyk	22	2	1	0	10	4.00	52
Chuck Seelbach	4	0	0	0	2	4.70	0

== Awards and honors ==
=== Records ===
John Hiller

- American League record, most wins in one season by a relief pitcher (17)
- Major league record (since broken), most saves in one season by a left-handed pitcher (38)

=== Milestones ===
Al Kaline became the 12th player in the 3,000 hit club on September 24

=== League top ten finishers ===
Joe Coleman

- AL leader in hit batsmen (12)
- #2 in MLB in games started (41)
- #2 in MLB in home runs allowed (30)
- #2 in MLB in bases on balls allowed (158)
- #3 in MLB in earned runs allowed (137)
- #3 in AL in wild pitches (13)
- #6 in MLB in batters faced (1262)

Bill Freehan

- #5 in AL in slugging percentage (.479)

John Hiller

- #6 in AL in games finished (52)
- #7 in AL in saves (13)

Al Kaline

- 3rd oldest player in AL (39)

Lerrin LaGrow

- #3 in AL in losses (19)
- #4 in AL in wild pitches (12)
- #8 in AL in earned runs allowed (112)

Mickey Lolich

- MLB leader in home runs allowed (38)
- AL leader in losses (21)
- MLB leader in earned runs allowed (142)
- #2 in MLB in games started (41)
- #2 in MLB in hits allowed (310)
- #3 in MLB in complete games (27)
- #4 in AL in strikeout to walk ratio (2.59)
- #5 in AL in strikeouts (202)
- #5 in MLB in batters faced (1263)
- #7 in MLB in innings pitched (308)

Aurelio Rodríguez

- AL leader in games at third base (159)
- AL leader in innings at third base (1391-2/3)
- #4 in AL in games played (159)
- #5 in AL in outs (470)

Gary Sutherland

- AL leader in outs (489)
- #2 in AL in at bats per strikeout (16.7)
- #3 in AL in at bats (619)
- #4 in AL in singles (131)

=== Players ranking among top 100 all time at position ===
The following members of the 1975 Detroit Tigers are among the Top 100 of all time at their position, as ranked by The Bill James Historical Baseball Abstract in 2001:

- Bill Freehan: 12th best catcher of all time
- Norm Cash: 20th best first baseman of all time
- Aurelio Rodríguez: 91st best third baseman of all time
- Al Kaline: 11th best right fielder of all time
- Willie Horton: 55th best left fielder of all time
- Mickey Lolich: 72nd best pitcher of all time

== Farm system ==
Level	Team	League	Manager
AAA	Evansville Triplets	American Association	Fred Hatfield
AA	Montgomery Rebels	Southern League	Jim Leyland
A	Lakeland Tigers	Florida State League	Stubby Overmire
A	Clinton Pilots	Midwest League	Len Okrie
Rookie	Bristol Tigers	Appalachian League	Joe Lewis

LEAGUE CHAMPIONS: Bristol

== See also ==
- 1974 in Michigan
