= Fred Scherman =

American baseball player (born 1944)

- Pitcher
- Born: July 25, 1944 (age 81); Dayton, Ohio, U.S.
- Batted: Left Threw: Left

MLB debut
- April 26, 1969, for the Detroit Tigers

Last MLB appearance
- July 6, 1976, for the Montreal Expos

MLB statistics
- Win–loss record: 33–26
- Earned run average: 3.66
- Strikeouts: 297
- Stats at Baseball Reference

Teams
- Detroit Tigers (1969–1973); Houston Astros (1974–1975); Montreal Expos (1975–1976)

Frederick John Scherman, Jr. (born July 25, 1944) is a former left-handed relief pitcher in Major League Baseball from 1969 to 1976. He compiled a 33-26 record in eight major league seasons with a 3.66 earned run average (ERA), 39 saves, and 297 strikeouts.

A native of Dayton, Ohio, Scherman signed with the Minnesota Twins in 1963, but was traded to the Detroit Tigers in 1964. After five years in the Tigers' farm system, Scherman made his major league debut in 1969 and spent five years with the club from 1969 to 1973. His best season was 1971 when he set a Detroit Tigers record with 69 pitching appearances (second most in the American League during the 1971 season) and compiled an 11-6 record with a 2.71 ERA, 20 saves, and 40 games finished.

Scherman was traded to the Houston Astros in December 1973 and compiled a 2-6 record and 4.29 ERA for the Astros during the 1974 and 1975 seasons. He was sold to the Montreal Expos in June 1975 and compiled a 6-5 record and 4.02 ERA for Montreal in 1975 and 1976. Scherman concluded his career pitching in the Pittsburgh Pirates farm system in 1977 and in Japan during the 1978 season.

== Early years ==
Scherman was born in 1944 in Dayton, Ohio. As a child, from approximately age six to age nine, Scherman was crippled and had a metal brace on his left leg. After walking on crutches for three years, from approximately age 6 to age 9, he couldn't run, but his arms were really strong -- "the strongest kid in the school." He entered Little League three months after having the brace removed in December 1953 and found that he had an advantage because he could throw so hard. He recalled in a 2018 interview that "a bad thing turned into a good thing."

He attended Dayton's Fairview High School where he threw a screwball as a pitcher for the baseball team. He also played first base and compiled a .340 batting average.

After graduating from high school in 1962, Scherman played baseball for the Wiedemann-Budweiser team in the Dayton Class A amateur baseball league. During the 1962 season, he compiled a 1.38 ERA and had 108 strikeouts in 99 innings. Scherman also attended Ohio State University where he majored in civil engineering for two quarters.

== Professional baseball player ==
=== Minor leagues ===
In December 1963, Scherman signed with the Minnesota Twins organization. A Philadelphia Phillies coach offered him a $1,000 signing bonus to play as a first baseman, but he chose the Twins who offered him $5,000 to play as a pitcher. He dropped out of Ohio State to play for the Twins. During the 1964 season, he played for the Single-A Orlando Twins in the Florida State League, compiling a 14-13 record with a 2.33 ERA in 30 games (28 as a starter).

During the 1964 season, Scherman beat the Lakeland Tigers four times and drew the attention of Lakeland manager Al Federoff. Federoff suggested that the parent club, the Detroit Tigers, draft him. Based on Federoff's recommendation, the Tigers drafted Scherman from the Twins in December 1964 for a price of $8,000. Scherman was assigned to the Rocky Mount Leafs where Federoff became the manager. He was hit by a pitch at one point and suffered damage to the tendons in the elbow of his throwing arm. The injury almost ended his career, but Federoff stuck with him, allowing Scherman to rehabilitate by pitching to one batter, one inning, two innings, then extending until his arm was back.

Scherman spent a total of four seasons in the Tigers' farm system, including stints with the Rocky Mount (1965-1966), Montgomery Rebels (1966-1967), and Toledo Mud Hens (1968). He was a starter until 1967 and 1968, when he worked mostly as a relief pitcher. During the 1968 season, he compiled an 8-2 record with a 1.76 ERA in 30 games (22 in relief) for Toledo. The 1968 Toledo team, managed by Jack Tighe, compiled an 83-64 record with 13 future major league pitchers, including Scherman, Mike Marshall, Jim Rooker, Tom Timmermann, Les Cain, Dick Drago, Dick Radatz, Mike Kilkenny, and Jack DiLauro.

=== Detroit Tigers ===
He joined the Tigers at the start of the 1969 season and made his major league debut on April 26, 1969, giving up a home run to Carl Yastrzemski in his first appearance. He was returned to Toledo where he compiled a 6-3 record and 3.16 ERA. He was recalled by the Tigers in August 1969, recorded his first major league win against the Oakland Athletics on August 28 (on a walk-off home run by Jim Northrup), and finished the 1969 season with a 1-0 record and 6.76 ERA. He was with the Tigers for 106 days in 1969 but pitched only four innings. At one point, Scherman sat on the bench for more than 50 days without an appearance. He later recalled: "Day after day, I'd come to the ballpark, and nobody would even talk to me. . . . It got so I dreaded to go to the ballpark." Manager Mayo Smith never explained why Scherman was not being used. In a 2018 interview, Scherman said: "Mayo just had this thing that he didn't want me on the team. Johnny Sain wanted me on the team, and the general manager Jim Campbell wanted me on the team, but Mayo calls the shots. So he says ok put him on the team but I just won't pitch him."

One bright spot in Scherman's 1969 season was his experience with Detroit pitching coach Johnny Sain. Scherman credited Johnny Sain with building his confidence, encouraging him and helping him with the mental part of the game.

In 1970, Scherman spent his first full season in the majors, joining Tom Timmermann, John Hiller, and Daryl Patterson in the Tigers' bullpen. He earned his first save on May 22, appeared in 48 games for the Tigers (all in relief), and compiled a 4-4 record with a 3.23 ERA. He also struck out 58 batters in 69 2/3 innings pitched.

In 1971, Scherman emerged as the closer under the team's new manager Billy Martin. Martin said of Scherman: "He's our No. 1 man in the extremely difficult situations. Fred has everything a good relief pitcher needs. He warms up fast. He throws strikes. He has all the pitches. When he throws hard, he usually makes the batter hit the ball on the ground and he seems to be tireless." By early June, he had appeared in 26 of the Tigers' 50 games and had a 4-0 record and 1.92 ERA. Interviewed at the time, Scherman said: "I'm in the groove right now. . . . I don't think I'm doing anything different. The guys are just making the plays. With the players we've got -- the infield we've got -- I just try to get them to hit ground balls." He ultimately appeared in 37 of the first 56 games. For the full season, Scherman compiled an 11-6 record with a 2.71 ERA that was nearly a point below the American League average ERA of 3.61. He set a Detroit record with 69 pitching appearances (second most in the American League) and also ranked among the league leaders with 20 saves (third), 40 games finished (third), and a .647 win-loss percentage (10th).

Scherman relied on his fastball, which he described as a sinking, moving fastball, and his success came when he gained control of it. He mixed in a slider and very rarely a curveball or ever more rarely a changeup. As a short reliever, he relied heavily on his fastball which was his main pitch. He recalled: "I played three years for Billy Martin and if you got beat on your second best pitch he flipped out, I mean he just went bananas. You don't get beat on your second best pitch, so pretty much it was, 'Here it comes, it's me and you, let's see who's better.'" Scherman's philosophy was that location is the key to pitching: "Location is the most important thing in pitching. Everybody thinks, well, it's how hard you throw but it's not. It's where you put the ball. Location's the most important, movement's the second most important, and velocity's the third most important."

In 1972, Scherman compiled a 7–3 record and 3.64 ERA with 12 saves in 57 games, including three as a starter. Scherman played in Game 2 of the 1972 American League Championship Series, a 5-0 loss. He knocked Reggie Jackson to the ground twice with pitches on the inside of the plate, and the game later exploded into a brawl when Lerrin LaGrow hit Bert Campaneris with a pitch in the same game. Some blamed Scherman's knockdowns of Jackson for causing the fight. Scherman pitched only 2/3 of an inning in the ALCS and did not allow an earned run. Scherman won the "King Tiger" award from Detroit fans in both 1971 and 1972.

Scherman also gained note in 1972 for his hobby as a private pilot.

In 1973, Detroit's other left-handed reliever, John Hiller, posted a 1.44 ERA, appeared in 65 games, and set a major league record with 38 saves. Hiller's dominance left little room for Sherman who went from having 32 saves in 1971 and 1972 combined to only one save in 1973. Scherman recalled: "Hiller had a tremendous year. The rest of the bullpen couldn't get enough work. It was virtually mop-up."

With Hiller established as Detroit's left-handed closer, Scherman was traded from the Tigers to the Houston Astros for Gary Sutherland and Jim Ray at the Winter Meetings on December 3, 1973. Sutherland became the Tigers' starting second baseman for the 1974 and 1975 seasons.

=== Houston Astros ===
He struggled in Houston. During the 1974 season, he compiled a 2-5 record and 4.11 ERA with four saves in 54 relief appearances. He suffered from back problems that caused him to miss portions of the 1974 season. While he had a history of back problems, the problems had gotten worse: "The back just goes out, but it gets better. This time, it didn't." He underwent testing in late September and learned that he had been playing much of the 1974 season with two ruptured discs. Scherman blamed the hard surface at the Astrodome for aggravating his back problems. He underwent back surgery in the off-season.

Scherman began the 1975 season with the Astros and compiled a 0-1 record and 4.96 ERA in 16 relief appearances. On April 20, he gave up a two-run, two-out, ninth-inning home run to Pete Rose to lose a game for Houston.

=== Montreal Expos ===
On June 8, 1975, the Montreal Expos announced that they had acquired Scherman for cash and future considerations. The Expos initially used Scherman as a starter. In his first six starts, he pitched well but did not get run support from the Expos. Manager Gene Mauch said at the time: "Fred has given us a chance to win all six games he started. He has held everyone to one, two, or three runs for six innings though we haven't given him any runs" Scherman ended up returning to the bullpen; he appeared in 34 games for the 1975 Expos, seven of them as a starter, and compiled a 4-3 record with an improved 3.54 ERA.

In 1976, Scherman appeared in 31 games for the Expos, all in relief, and compiled a 2-2 record and 4.95 ERA. He later described himself in 1976 as having been "just a mediocre player on a real bad team." In a 2018 interview, he said: "The last couple years I pitched in the big leagues it didn't have any pop in it anymore. I was still trying to throw hard but I just didn't have that little extra pop that you need." He played his final Major League game on July 6, 1976. On July 7, he was asked to report to the Expos' farm club in Denver; he refused and was unconditionally released. Scherman said at the time: "There's no way I'll go to Denver. I've been around a long time. The last years have been tough. You hate to see it end but this is it. . . . I don't really feel that bad. I've got seven years in the majors. I've been in the game 13 years. I never expected I'd last this long."

=== Pittsburgh Pirates ===
Scherman attempted a comeback in 1977 with the Pittsburgh Pirates. However, the Pirates signed Goose Gossage and Terry Forster after signing Sherman. Scherman pitched 10 scoreless innings during the preseason, but the Pirates opted to release him in late March. When no other team claimed him, the Pirates sent him to their Columbus Clippers farm club in the International League. Scherman noted: "The Pirates want to use me as an insurance policy in case somebody gets hurt. For Triple A, they're paying me good. But it's not good when you think you should be in the big leagues." In 49 relief appearances for Columbus, he compiled a 6-8 record and 3.90 ERA and nine saves.

=== Hiroshima Carp ===
In 1978, Scherman moved to Japan with his wife and two pre-school children pursuant to a contract with the Hiroshima Carp. He expected to pitch for the Carp, but after arriving, he learned that the team had too many American players. Scherman was sent to a minor league club as a player-coach.

== Family and later years ==
Scherman and his wife, Frankie, adopted two children: son, Fred III, and daughter, Andrea. As of 1993, he was living in Brookville, Ohio, and was employed as a production manager for Iams in Dayton.
