= Blessitt =

Blessitt is an English surname. Notable people with the surname include:

- Arthur Blessitt (1940–2025), American traveling Christian preacher
- Ike Blessitt (born 1949), American baseball player
