= Duke Sims =

American baseball player (born 1941)

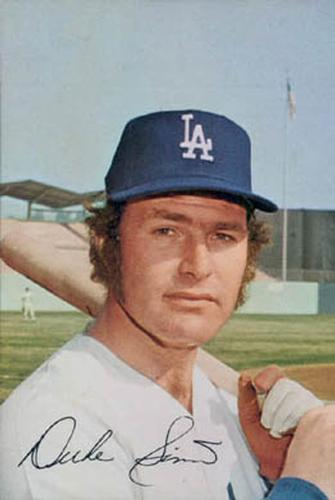
- Catcher
- Born: June 5, 1941 (age 85); Salt Lake City, Utah, U.S.
- Batted: Left Threw: Right

MLB debut
- September 22, 1964, for the Cleveland Indians

Last MLB appearance
- September 26, 1974, for the Texas Rangers

MLB statistics
- Batting average: .239
- Home runs: 100
- Runs batted in: 310
- Stats at Baseball Reference

Teams
- Cleveland Indians (1964–1970); Los Angeles Dodgers (1971–1972); Detroit Tigers (1972–1973); New York Yankees (1973–1974); Texas Rangers (1974)

Duane B. "Duke" Sims (born June 5, 1941) is an American former professional baseball catcher, first baseman, outfielder, and designated hitter. He played in all or part of 11 seasons in Major League Baseball (MLB) from 1964 to 1974 for the Cleveland Indians, Los Angeles Dodgers, Detroit Tigers, New York Yankees, and Texas Rangers. He has the most career home runs (100) of any MLB player born in Utah. He was the last player to hit a home run in the original Yankee Stadium. Sims played in all or part of eight seasons in Minor League Baseball (MiLB) where he was selected as an all-star numerous times, and once won a Silver Glove for fielding as a catcher.

== Early life ==
Sims was born on June 5, 1941, in Salt Lake City, but moved to Idaho with his family as an infant. He attended Pocatello High School in Pocatello, Idaho, where he played on the baseball, football, and basketball teams. Sims was a first baseman, outfielder and catcher on the school's baseball team. He became a catcher out of necessity for the team as a senior, his first time playing the position. He hit a home run in the 1959 Southern Idaho Conference baseball championship game, though Pocatello lost to Boise High School, 2–1.

Sims played quarterback, cornerback and/or wingback on the school's football team. In 1958, the 6 ft 2 in (1.88 m) 200 lb (90.1 kg) Sims was selected second-team All-Southern Idaho High School Football Conference. He also played center on Pocatello's basketball team. In 1959, he was named an all-star in the Southern Idaho Class AAA Regional Basketball Tournament. As a senior in 1959, he was named Pocatello High School's all-around athlete of the year. He also played American Legion Baseball.

After beginning his Minor League Baseball (MiLB) baseball career, in the Fall of 1959 Sims enrolled at the University of Idaho (one of the schools that had offered him a football scholarship). After attending Idaho for two years in the baseball offseasons, he transferred to Idaho State College. He ceased attending Idaho State when he knew the Cleveland Indians were going to call him up as an MLB player in 1965.

== Professional baseball ==
At least seven colleges offered him football scholarships, and a number of junior colleges pursued him to play baseball. Instead of accepting any of these, scout Carl Mays of the Cleveland Indians signed Sims to a professional baseball contract in June 1959. Sims went on to a 16-year career in professional baseball. He batted left-handed, and threw right-handed as a fielder.

=== Minor leagues ===
After signing with Cleveland, Sims was assigned to the short-season Class D North Platte Indians of the Nebraska State League in 1959. He received his nickname "Duke" from manager Mark Wylie, who said he did not like the name Duane and instead would call Sims Duke; a change that Sims himself preferred. In 46 games, it has been reported that he had a .279 batting average, with three home runs, 30 runs batted in (RBI), and 26 runs scored, along with an .801 OPS (on-base plus slugging). He had a .970 fielding percentage at catcher, with 326 putouts. Contemporaneously, it was unofficially reported that he batted .283, playing mostly as a catcher and had a .960 overall fielding percentage, leading the team with 322 putouts. In 1960, Sims played 104 games for the Selma Cloverleafs in the Class D Alabama-Florida League; batting .275, with 12 home runs, 56 RBIs and an .820 OPS. He had a .984 fielding percentage at catcher. He was selected to play in the Alabama-Florida League All-Star Game.

Sims arguably had the best hitting year of his professional career in 1961 with the Class B Alamance Indians of the Carolina League, playing in Burlington, North Carolina. He was selected as a Carolina League all-star catcher that season, and had career-highs in games (124), plate appearances (478), hits (123), RBIs (88), runs (83), doubles (36), and OPS (.956). He had a .304 batting average and hit 21 home runs, one of only two seasons in his professional career with more than 20 home runs in a season. Sims believed he actually hit 22 home runs that season, and failed to receive proper credit. He hit three home runs in a single game that season. He was first in the Carolina League in doubles, third in home runs and RBIs, and fourth in batting average. Sims was named to the 15-player All-Carolina League Team at the end of the season.

Sims began the next season (1962) with the Single-A Charleston Indians of the Eastern League. He hit .321 in 83 games, with eight home runs, 57 RBIs, and an .877 OPS. Sims was named a starting catcher in the 1962 Eastern League All-Star Game. He was also selected to the Eastern League's All-Star Team at the end of the season. He was sent to the Jacksonville Suns of the Triple-A International League during the season when Suns catcher Harry Chiti suffered an injury. Once with the Suns, however, he played in only 21 games, often being used as a pinch hitter, as well as a catcher. He hit only .154 in 73 plate appearance, with three home runs and nine RBIs.

He began the 1963 season with the Double-A Nashville Volunteers of the South Atlantic League, a Los Angeles Angels affiliate, where he played in only 12 games, batting .171. Sims had some personal difficulties in 1963, and Cleveland thought it best for him to spend some time in another setting. He rejoined Charleston, in the now Double-A Eastern League. In 90 games with Charleston that season, Sims hit .270, with 10 home runs, 50 RBIs, 53 bases on balls, 43 runs, and an .880 OPS; to go along with a .994 fielding percentage at catcher. Among players with at least 347 plate appearances, he was fourth in the Eastern League in OPS and ninth in batting average. For the second consecutive season, he was named to the Eastern League All-Star Team at the end of the season.

Sims played for the Triple-A Portland Beavers of the Pacific Coast League in 1964. In 107 games, he batted .244, with 13 homes runs, 41 RBIs and 43 runs scored. Among Sims' minor league teammates with Portland in 1964 was future six-time MLB all-star Cleveland Indian pitcher Sam McDowell, and future MLB all-star pitchers Luis Tiant and Tommy John. Mays had originally scouted Sims as a catcher, but Sims has said that although he had a strong throwing arm, his catching skills were undeveloped out of high school and during his early years in MiLB baseball. He had to work on a range of catching skills for years in the minor leagues to establish the fundamental skills for playing the position. Sims won a silver glove for fielding as a catcher in 1964.

He played in the Puerto Rican Winter League before the start of the 1965 season, again to work on developing his catching skills. In 1965, he split time between Portland and Cleveland. In Portland, he hit .318 in 35 games, with six home runs and 23 RBIs in 107 at bats. He had a 1.041 OPS, by far the highest OPS he had playing for any team in any league during his entire professional career. He began the 1966 season in Cleveland, but suffered a back injury in June that put him on the disabled list, after which he was optioned back to Portland. He played in nine games for the Beavers, batting .321, and returned to Cleveland in mid-August.

=== Major leagues ===
==== Cleveland Indians ====
Sims was first called up to the major leagues in September 1964. He played in two games with Cleveland that season. In mid-June 1965, Cleveland called Sims up from Portland, where he was hitting .325 at the time. As a rookie with Cleveland in 1965, Sims played in 48 games, starting 33 at catcher with a .988 fielding percentage. He batted .178 in 118 at bats, with six home runs, 15 RBIs, and a .601 OPS; playing behind starting catcher Joe Azcue.

In 1966, Sims won the third-string catcher position over Doc Edwards in spring training camp, playing behind Azcue and Del Crandall. Cleveland manager Birdie Tebbetts (himself a former MLB catcher) considered Sims the most improved player in training camp that year. Sims' power hitting was superior to Edwards, and gave him an advantage over Edwards. He began the season with Cleveland and after suffering a back injury in early June and spending some time with the Portland Beavers, Sims returned to Cleveland in mid-August. He played in 50 games for Cleveland over the course of the 1966 season, starting 31 at catcher, while batting .263 in 133 at bats with six home runs and 19 RBIs. Sims did not play again in MiLB after 1966.

During spring training in 1967, Azcue was upset that Sims was being used ahead of him as the starting catcher, and stated that if he was not going to start he wanted to be traded. Sims started on opening day that season, but Azcue was not traded. Azcue started 80 games that season, with Sims starting 77 games, and rookie third-string catcher Ray Fosse starting five games. Sims batted only .202 to Azcue's .251, with 12 home runs and 37 RBIs. Cleveland would platoon Azcue, a right-handed hitter, and Sims as a left-handed hitter, depending on the opposing pitcher.

In 1968, Sims started 71 games at catcher, 29 games as a first baseman, and three as an outfielder. He had MLB career highs of 122 games played and 429 plate appearances; batting .249, with 11 home runs, 44 RBIS, and 48 runs scored. Sims caught Indians pitcher Sam McDowell for one year of his minor league career and during his years with Cleveland. He was often McDowell's catcher because opposing teams would often use their top right-handed pitchers when facing McDowell, which led to Sims playing as a left-handed hitter. In 1967 and 1968, Cleveland's starting pitching staff included McDowell, Tiant, Sonny Siebert, Steve Hargan, and Stan Williams, among others, with the team leading the American League in earned run average (2.66) in 1968.

In 1969, Sims became the Indians starting catcher, starting 96 games that season, with Fosse and Ken Suarez now his backups. Azcue had been traded in mid-April. Sims had a .991 fielding percentage that season, fourth best in the American League. He batted .236, with a then career-high 18 home runs, and 45 RBIs, 40 runs scored, and an .801 OPS. In 1970, Fosse started 120 games at catcher and became an American League All-Star. Fosse missed time that season due to mandated military reserve service. Sims started 38 games as Fosse's backup catcher, 34 as an outfielder, and 25 as a first baseman. He batted .264, with MLB career-highs of 23 home runs, 56 RBIs, and an .859 OPS.

==== Los Angeles Dodgers and Detroit Tigers ====
In December 1970, Sims was traded to the Los Angeles Dodgers for Alan Foster and Ray Lamb. Sims started 59 games as the Dodgers' catcher in 1971, batting an MLB career high .274, for seasons where he had at least 250 plate appearances. He had six home runs, 25 RBIs, and 23 runs scored. In 1972, he started 41 games at catcher and was batting .192, when he was waived by the Dodgers in early August. He had hurt his back early in the season, which affected his playing ability.

Sims was claimed by the Detroit Tigers, who were managed by Billy Martin in 1972. Martin thought acquiring Sims was the Tigers second-best transaction during his time as the Tigers' manager. Sims started 25 games at catcher and three in the outfield for the Tigers. He hit .316 in 98 at bats, with four home runs and 19 RBIs. He started occasionally behind starting catcher Bill Freehan, but started more often toward the end of season after Freehan was injured on September 22. In his first game with the Tigers on August 5, Sims had two hits in five at bats; including a seventh inning home run against Gaylord Perry (who would win the American League's Cy Young Award that year) and the game-winning single in the 11th inning against Perry. By September 27, he had three game-winning hits for the Tigers. It has been stated that overall in 1972, Sims had 10 game-winning or game-tying hits while playing for the Tigers that season.

The Tigers finished in first place in the American League East Division, 86–70. Sims played in the post-season for the first time in his career. The Tigers lost the 1972 American League Championship Series to the Oakland Athletics in five games. Martin started Sims at catcher in Game 1, batting in the third position. Sims had two hits in five at bats, including a double against future Baseball Hall of Fame pitcher Catfish Hunter and a triple against future Hall of Fame pitcher Rollie Fingers. Martin started Sims at catcher again in Game 2, but Sims had no hits in three at bats. Sims was catching in Game 2 when Athletics' shortstop Bert Campaneris threw his bat at Tigers' pitcher Lerrin LaGrow after being hit on the ankle by a LaGrow pitch, Campaneris believing it was intentional (which Sims has said was not the case). This resulted in a chaotic bench clearing confrontation between the teams. Sims did not play in Game 3 against left handed pitcher Ken Holtzman. He was the starting leftfielder in Game 4, again batting third in the lineup, with one hit in three at bats; a double against Hunter. In the deciding Game 5, a 2–1 A's win, Martin again batted Sims third, playing left field; but Sims was hitless in three at bats.

Sims remained with the Tigers in 1973, until they waived him in late-September. He started 62 games as a catcher and six in the outfield, batting .242 with eight home runs and 30 RBIs.

==== New York Yankees and Texas Rangers ====
It is also reported that the New York Yankees purchased Sims contract rights from the Tigers in late September 1973. He played in four games for the Yankees as a designated hitter and catcher; with three hits in nine at bats, including one home run. He is credited as the last person to hit a home run in the original Yankee Stadium, in the seventh inning of an 8–5 loss to the Detroit Tigers on the last day of the 1973 season, September 30. The first person to hit a home run at Yankee Stadium, known as "the House that Ruth Built", was Babe Ruth, on April 18, 1923.

Sims began the 1974 season with the Yankees, now playing home games at Shea Stadium. He played in five games for the Yankees before being traded to the Texas Rangers on May 7 for Larry Gura and cash. He played in 39 games for the Rangers, batting .208 with three home runs and six RBIs. The Rangers released Sims in January 1975, ending his career.

Over his 11-year MLB career, Sims batted .239 with 100 home runs, 310 RBIs, 263 runs scored, a .741 OPS and 12.8 WAR (wins above replacement); and a career .986 fielding percentage as a catcher. He threw out 160 runners attempting to steal, and had a 35% caught stealing percentage.

== Managerial career ==
After being out of baseball for 12 years, Sims developed an interest in becoming involved in baseball again as a manager, and wrote to all 26 MLB teams seeking a position. After a lengthy interview process, the Chicago White made Sims manager of the Appleton Foxes in the Single-A Midwest League in 1986. During the season, they promoted him to manager of the Peninsula White Sox in the Carolina League. He was hired by White Sox director of player development Alvin Dark, who had been Sims manager for three years (1968 to 1970) in Cleveland; and Ken Harrelson, the White Sox executive in charge of the team's baseball operations who had been Sims' teammate in Cleveland in 1969 and 1970. Harrelson believed Sims had three key qualities that would make him a good manager: (1) depth of baseball knowledge; (2) being an "outstanding competitor"; and (3) being an "outstanding worker". Ken Harrelson resigned his position at the end of the 1986 season, and Sims was replaced as manager before the following season, making 1986 his only year managing.

== Legacy ==
Sims holds the distinction of finishing his career with exactly 100 home runs, the current record for a player born in the state of Utah. In addition to hitting the final home run in the original Yankee Stadium on the last day of the 1973 season, Sims was also the catcher that day, making him the last Yankee to catch a game in the original Yankee Stadium.

== Personal life ==
After leaving professional baseball as a player, Sims worked for former Texas Rangers owner Brad Corbett in the plastic (PVC) pipe business until 1981 or 1982, and then worked in the insurance business before taking on the minor league managing position in 1986. He worked in the financial field in 1987, until the "Black Monday" stock market failure of October 19, 1987. He later became a loan officer. Sims moved to Las Vegas in 1992, and retired to Sun City Summerlin in Las Vegas.
