= Paul Jata =

American baseball player (born 1949)

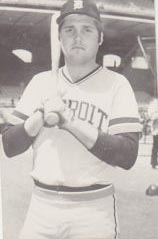
- Jata in 1972
- First baseman/Outfielder
- Born: September 4, 1949 (age 76); Astoria, New York, U.S.
- Batted: Right Threw: Right

MLB debut
- April 19, 1972, for the Detroit Tigers

Last MLB appearance
- October 4, 1972, for the Detroit Tigers

MLB statistics
- Home runs: 0
- Runs batted in: 3
- Batting average: .230
- Stats at Baseball Reference

Teams
- Detroit Tigers (1972)

Paul Jata (born September 4, 1949) is an American former Major League Baseball utility player who played 32 games with the 1972 Detroit Tigers.

A native of Astoria, Queens, Jata is of Polish heritage. He began playing baseball as a left-handed batter. His older brothers persuaded him to become a right-handed batter, and he was a .400 hitter at William Cullen Bryant High School in Astoria, New York. In 1967, Jata was drafted by the Tigers in the 5th round of the 1967 amateur draft. He signed with the Tigers for $10,000.

Jata married Mary Olson of Rockwood, Michigan on June 12, 1971. After the wedding, Jata had a 14-game hitting streak for the Toledo Mud Hens. He had a .367 batting average in the 23 games following the ceremony. The Sporting News published a three-column feature story on Jata's post-wedding hitting streak titled "Wedded Bliss Helps Hens' Jata to Big Rookie Season".

Jata spent several years in the Tigers' minor league system with the Lakeland Tigers (1967–1968), Rocky Mount Leafs (1969), Montgomery Rebels (1970), and Toledo Mud Hens (1971).

After an impressive showing in the Tigers' 1972 spring camp, Jata made the big league roster. In April 1972, Detroit manager Billy Martin said he preferred to use Jata as the No. 3 catcher and at first base. The Sporting News reported that "his big asset is a level swing as a right-handed pinch-hitter." He played 32 games with the 1972 Tigers (12 games at first base, five in left field, five in right field, and one at catcher) and hit .230 with 17 hits, 8 runs, 3 RBIs and no home runs. Jata played his final major league game on October 4, 1972, the last day of the 1972 regular season. He continued to play in the Tigers' minor league organization in 1973 for the Montgomery Rebels and Toledo Mud Hens. He was traded to the Minnesota Twins for Jim Nettles after the 1973 season.. He played for the Orlando Twins in 1976.
