= Baseball's Greatest Hits =

- Baseball's Greatest Hits

Compilation album by various artists
- Released: 1989
- Label: Rhino

Alternative cover
- Baseball's Greatest Hits – Let's Play II

Baseball's Greatest Hits is the name of two different CD collections of songs and other recordings connected with baseball, released in 1989.

The eclectic collections include vintage songs such as Les Brown's "Joltin' Joe DiMaggio" from 1941, Teresa Brewer's 1956 number "I Love Mickey" (with a cameo by Mickey Mantle himself), and Danny Kaye's humorous 1962 recording about the Los Angeles Dodgers. Spoken entries include verbiage such as Russ Hodges' call of Bobby Thomson's pennant-winning home run in 1951, Tommy Lasorda's rant about Dave Kingman, and the Abbott and Costello classic, "Who's on First?".

Due to licensing restrictions, Rhino was unable to include "Centerfield" by John Fogerty.

== Baseball's Greatest Hits (1990) ==
1. "Take Me Out to the Ball Game" (Excerpt) – Doc & Merle Watson
2. "Who's on First?" – Abbott and Costello
3. "Joltin' Joe DiMaggio" – Les Brown and His Orchestra with Betty Bonney
4. "Say Hey (The Willie Mays Song)" – The Treniers with Willie Mays
5. "I Love Mickey" – Teresa Brewer with Mickey Mantle
6. "Van Lingle Mungo" – Dave Frishberg
7. "D-O-D-G-E-R-S (Oh, Really? No, O'Malley!)" – Danny Kaye
8. "Did You See Jackie Robinson Hit That Ball?" – Count Basie & His Orchestra
9. Lou Gehrig's farewell speech July 4, 1939 – Lou Gehrig
10. "Move Over, Babe (Here Comes Henry)" – Bill Slayback
11. "Take Me Out to the Ball Game" – Bruce Springstone (a Bruce Springsteen imitator)
12. "(Love Is Like a) Baseball Game" – The Intruders
13. "Willie, Mickey and the Duke (Talkin' Baseball)" – Terry Cashman
14. "The Land of Wrigley" – Stormy Weather
15. "A Dying Cub Fan's Last Request" – Steve Goodman
16. "The Ball Game" – Sister Wynona Carr
17. "Baseball Dreams" – The Naturals with Mel Allen
18. "Baseball Card Lover" – Rockin' Richie Ray
19. Tommy Lasorda talking about Dave Kingman's May 14, 1978 game – Tommy Lasorda
20. "We Are the Champions" – Big Blue Wrecking Crew
21. Bobby Thomson's shot heard 'round the world – Russ Hodges
22. "Casey at the Bat" – DeWolf Hopper

== Baseball's Greatest Hits – Let's Play II (1992) ==
1. Intro: Mr. Cub – Ernie Banks, Hall of Fame, August 8, 1977
2. "It's a Beautiful Day for a Ball Game" – The Harry Simeone Songsters
3. "The First Baseball Game" – Nat King Cole with Orchestra conducted by Ralph Carmichael
4. "Robbie-Doby-Boogie" – Brownie McGhee
5. "Let's Keep The Dodgers In Brooklyn" – Phil Foster with music by Rey Ross
6. Bogey on baseball circa 1950 – Humphrey Bogart
7. "Baseball, Baseball" – Jane Morgan with the George Barnes Quintet
8. "The St. Louis Browns" – Skip Battin
9. "You've Got to Have Heart" – Original cast recording from Damn Yankees
10. Casey and the Mick – Casey Stengel, Mickey Mantle, and U.S. Senator Estes Kefauver
11. "Right Field" – Peter, Paul and Mary
12. "Knock It Out the Park" – Sam and Dave with the Dixie Flyers
13. "Play-by-Play (I Saw It On the Radio)" – Terry Cashman
14. "Hammerin' Hank's Historic Homer" – Milo Hamilton
15. "That Last Home Run" – McKinley Mitchell with Willie Dixon's Chicago Blues All-Stars
16. "Baseball Blues" – Claire Hamill
17. "Will You Be Ready (At the Plate when Jesus Throws the Ball)?" – Elmo and Patsy
18. "What Sparks a Champion?" – unknown artist
19. "The Philadelphia Fillies" – Del Reeves
20. "The Bingo Long Song (Steal On Home)" – Thelma Houston
21. "The Cubbies Are Rockin'" – M.C. Gary/D.J. Barry & The Aggregation
22. The game for all America (a definition of baseball) – Ernie Harwell
23. "Na Na Hey Hey (Kiss Him Goodbye)" – The C. Norman Ensemble of The First Baptist Church of Crown Heights
