= Marvin Lane =

American baseball player (born 1950)

- Outfielder
- Born: January 18, 1950 (age 75); Sandersville, Georgia
- Batted: Right Threw: Right

MLB debut
- September 4, 1971, for the Detroit Tigers

Last MLB appearance
- October 3, 1976, for the Detroit Tigers

MLB statistics
- Games: 90
- At-bats: 179
- Hits: 37

Teams
- Detroit Tigers (1971–1974, 1976)

Marvin Lane (born January 18, 1950), is a former Major League Baseball outfielder who played from 1971 to 1974 and in 1976 with the Detroit Tigers.

== Early years ==
Lane was born in Sandersville, Georgia in 1950 and attended Pershing High School in Detroit, Michigan. While attending Pershing, Lane played quarterback for the football team and outfielder for the baseball team. He was also the point guard on the 1967 Pershing basketball team that won the Michigan state championship. His teammates on Pershing's 1967 basketball team included future NBA stars, Spencer Haywood and Ralph Simpson. According to Tigers' scout Bill Lajoie, "Lane might have been Detroit's best prep athlete at the time."

== Professional baseball ==
He was drafted by the Tigers in the 10th round of the 1968 amateur draft and played five seasons with the team. Lane appeared only briefly on Tigers' roster during the 1971 to 1973 seasons, appearing in no more than eight games in any season, and spending most of his time in the team's minor league organization. On September 30, 1973, Lane hit a home run at Yankee Stadium, making him the last visiting player to hit a home run at the stadium before its renovations from 1974 to 1975. In 1974, Lane appeared in 50 games for the Tigers. In July 1974, Lane had four hits, including a triple, in four at bats and scored two runs in an 8-2 victory over the Kansas City Royals.

Billy Martin, who was the manager of the Tigers from 1971 to 1973, attributed his firing to a difference of opinion about Lane with general manager Jim Campbell. Martin later recalled, "Campbell kept touting Ike Blessitt and Marvin Lane. He said they were our outfielders of the future, but to me they couldn't play. ... And these were the so-called great kids Campbell wanted me to stick with. I knew they wouldn't make the grade, and that eventually got me fired. I made the mistake of telling Campbell his star kids were bad, and he didn't like hearing it, so we got into it."

Lane compiled a career batting average of .207 with three home runs and 17 RBI. He was unconditionally released by the Tigers on March 28, 1977. A spokesman for the team stated that Lane had been cut because he wanted to try to make a major league roster rather than playing another year in the Tigers' minor league organization.
