= Ike Brown =

American baseball player (1942–2001)

- 1972 Topps baseball card
- Utility player
- Born: April 13, 1942; Memphis, Tennessee, U.S.
- Died: May 17, 2001 (aged 59); Memphis, Tennessee, U.S.
- Batted: Right Threw: Right

MLB debut
- June 17, 1969, for the Detroit Tigers

Last MLB appearance
- May 4, 1974, for the Detroit Tigers

MLB statistics
- Batting average: .256
- Home runs: 20
- Runs batted in: 65
- Stats at Baseball Reference

Teams
- Detroit Tigers (1969–1974)

Isaac Brown (April 13, 1942 – May 17, 2001) was an American infielder and outfielder who played professional baseball for 14 years from 1961 to 1974, including six seasons in Major League Baseball for the Detroit Tigers from 1969 through 1974. He batted and threw right-handed. Brown was the last former Negro league player to make it to the Major Leagues.

In a six-season major-league career, Brown posted a .256 batting average with 20 home runs and 65 runs batted in in 280 games played.

A native of Memphis, Tennessee, Brown was obtained by Detroit from the Negro league Kansas City Monarchs in 1961. He had originally signed with the St. Louis Cardinals for $800.

Brown spent eight years in the minor leagues, making it to the majors in 1969 after hitting .356 of that season for the Triple-A Toledo Mud Hens and hitting two home runs against the Tigers during an exhibition game. His first major league hit was a home run at Yankee Stadium.

In the minors, Brown once played all nine positions in a single game. Brown was often called on to pinch-hit, batting .320 in that role between 1970 and 1971. He also contributed to the Tigers American League East title in 1972, collecting a hit and two RBIs in two at-bats against the Oakland Athletics.

Although mostly a part-time player with Detroit, Brown became a popular and recognizable figure in Detroit because of his trademark glasses and unusually burly build. He was often mistakenly identified as the brother of roommate Gates Brown, to whom he bore no relation. According to Gates, Ike would wake up every morning saying, "It's a beautiful day" whether it was or not.

At the time of his retirement from the Tigers in 1974, Brown was one of the last alumni of the Negro leagues (along with Hank Aaron) still active in Major League Baseball.

Brown died from cancer in Memphis, Tennessee, at the age of 59.
