= Bill Slayback =

American baseball player (1948–2015)

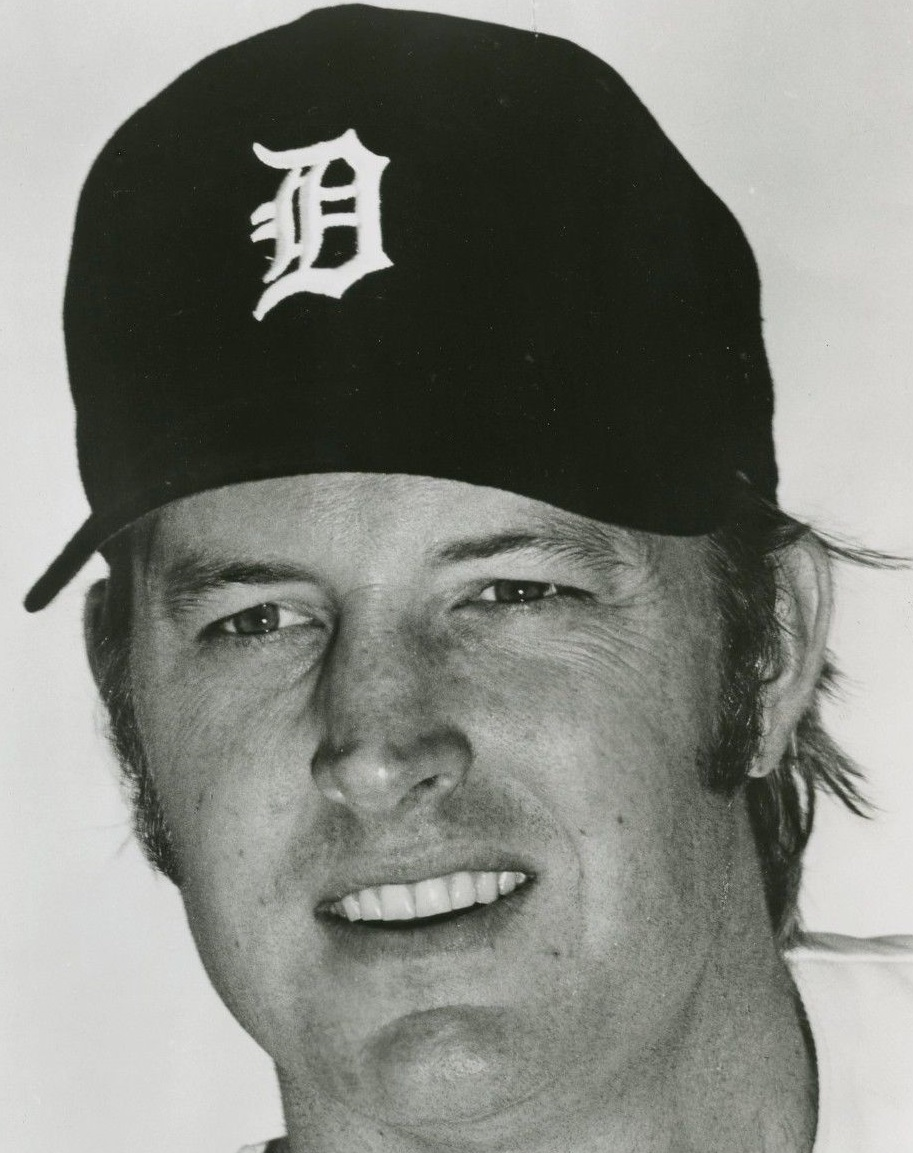
- Pitcher
- Born: February 21, 1948; Hollywood, California, U.S.
- Died: March 25, 2015 (aged 67); Los Angeles, California, U.S.
- Batted: Right Threw: Right

MLB debut
- June 26, 1972, for the Detroit Tigers

Last MLB appearance
- October 2, 1974, for the Detroit Tigers

MLB statistics
- Win–loss record: 6–9
- Earned run average: 3.84
- Strikeouts: 89
- Stats at Baseball Reference

Teams
- Detroit Tigers (1972–1974)

William Grover Slayback (February 21, 1948 – March 25, 2015) was an American professional baseball pitcher. He appeared in 42 games, 17 as a starter for the Detroit Tigers of Major League Baseball (MLB).

== Playing career ==
After playing for California State University, Northridge, the 6' 4", 180 lb. Slayback was drafted by the Detroit Tigers in the 7th round of the 1968 Major League Baseball draft. Slayback made his Major League Baseball debut with the Tigers on June 26, 1972, against the New York Yankees. After holding the Yankees hitless through his first seven innings, the no-hitter was broken up in the eighth stanza on a sharp single off the bat of New York Yankees outfielder Johnny Callison. He pitched 8 1/3 innings, allowed 4 hits, struck out 5, and gave up 2 earned runs. Slayback had multiple other impressive starts for the Tigers in the 1972 season ... on July 20, he struck out 13 batters and allowed 5 hits while beating the Texas Rangers, 5–1. Just 4 days prior to that, he pitched a complete game-shutout, going the full 9 innings in a 2–0 win over the Kansas City Royals on July 16. Slayback started 13 games for the 1972 Tigers, compiling a record of 5–6 with a 3.20 earned run average. Slayback pitched only two innings in 1973, and his career ended in 1974 as he went 1–3 with a 4.77 ERA in 16 games (only four as a starter). Slayback retired in 1976, with a 6–9 record, and a 3.84 ERA.

== Music career ==
In 1973, Slayback recorded a 45-rpm record, co-written with Detroit Tigers broadcaster Ernie Harwell called "Move Over Babe (Here Comes Henry)." The record captured Hank Aaron's journey in overtaking Babe Ruth for the all-time home run record. The lyrics to the song included these lines:

"Move over, Babe. Here comes Henry and he's swinging mean. Move over, Babe. Hank's hit another; he'll break that 714." The song was covered that same year, by Richard "Popcorn" Wylie.

Released in the United States and Japan, the song got airplay on radio and the NBC Game of the Week. The song is included on Rhino Records' CD "Baseball's Greatest Hits." One biographer of Aaron had this to say about Slayback: "Slayback, who provided the music, was something of a Renaissance man. He sang, played numerous instruments, painted, sketched, and made furniture." Tom Stanton, Hank Aaron and the Home Run that Changed America (HarperCollins 2005), p. 116.

In 2006, Slayback issued a new CD titled "Lady Dancing on Fire." Tigers manager Jim Leyland gave it a positive review: "I have something that I want the Tigers to play at Comerica Park, 'Lady Dancing on Fire' by Billy Slayback. It's outstanding; it has all the stuff; it's tremendous. He did all the music, all the instruments, he played them all."

== Personal life ==
Slayback died on March 25, 2015, aged 67.

== See also ==
- 1972 Detroit Tigers season
