= Joe Staton (baseball) =

American baseball player (1948–2022)

- First baseman
- Born: March 8, 1948; Seattle, Washington, U.S.
- Died: June 20, 2022 (aged 74); Mercer Island, Washington, U.S.
- Batted: Left Threw: Left

MLB debut
- September 5, 1972, for the Detroit Tigers

Last MLB appearance
- September 30, 1973, for the Detroit Tigers

MLB statistics
- Batting average: .211
- Home runs: 0
- Runs batted in: 3
- Stats at Baseball Reference

Teams
- Detroit Tigers (1972–1973)

Joseph Staton (March 8, 1948 – June 20, 2022) was an American professional baseball player. A first baseman, he appeared in 15 games with 19 official at bats for the Detroit Tigers of Major League Baseball during the 1972 and 1973 seasons. Staton threw and batted left-handed; he stood 6 feet 3 inches (1.91 m) tall and weighed 175 pounds (79 kg).

Signed by Detroit as a non-drafted, amateur free agent in 1970, Staton played for five seasons in the Tiger farm system, batting .301 in 518 career games. He was recalled by the Tigers in September 1972 and got into six games as a pinch runner and late-inning defensive replacement at first base. In 1973, again during a September tryout, he appeared in nine games, starting three, and collected his four Major League hits, all singles. He retired from baseball after the 1974 minor league season.
