= John Gamble (baseball) =

American baseball player (1948–2022)

- Shortstop
- Born: February 10, 1948; Reno, Nevada, U.S.
- Died: September 1, 2022 (aged 74); Orovada, Nevada, U.S.
- Batted: Right Threw: Right

MLB debut
- September 7, 1972, for the Detroit Tigers

Last MLB appearance
- May 25, 1973, for the Detroit Tigers

MLB statistics
- Batting average: .000
- Home runs: 0
- RBI: 0
- Stats at Baseball Reference

Teams
- Detroit Tigers (1972–1973)

John Robert Gamble Jr. (February 10, 1948 – September 1, 2022) was an American professional baseball shortstop who played thirteen games for the Detroit Tigers in two seasons of Major League Baseball (MLB) from 1972 to 1973. He batted and threw right handed and served primarily as a pinch runner.

Gamble was drafted by the Los Angeles Dodgers in 1966 and played for the team's minor league affiliates until 1970, when he was acquired by the Detroit Tigers via the Rule 5 draft. The Tigers promoted him to the major leagues two years later. Although he was noted for his base stealing skills during his time in the farm system, and was added to the major league roster to bring speed into the lineup, he ultimately did not attempt a stolen base. He played his last game on May 25, 1973, but carried on playing three more seasons in the minor leagues. He subsequently returned to his home state of Nevada and worked for a local county park and as a high school coach.

== Early life ==
Gamble was born in Reno, Nevada, on February 10, 1948. He was the first of three sons of John Sr. and Muriel Gamble, both of whom worked as teachers. His father also served as superintendent of public education in Nevada from 1966 to 1978.

Gamble attended Carson High School in nearby Carson City, Nevada, where he starred in basketball and football in addition to baseball. He posted batting averages of .479 and .420 during his junior and senior years, respectively, which caught the attention of scouts and led to him being offered a baseball scholarship by the University of the Pacific.

== Professional career ==
=== Los Angeles Dodgers farm system ===
Gamble was drafted by the Los Angeles Dodgers in the second round of the 1966 Major League Baseball draft. In June 1966, he signed with the Dodgers and received a bonus that was reported as the second highest paid to that date to a baseball prospect from Nevada.

Gamble played seven seasons in the Dodgers' farm system from 1966 to 1972. He distinguished himself with his base stealing prowess, stealing a total of 169 bases from 1968 to 1971. He tallied a career-high 60 stolen bases in 1970 for Daytona Beach. In 1970, he led the Florida State League in both stolen bases (66) and runs scored (91). On defense, he showed a talent for turning the double play (50 in 1968, 56 in 1969), but led the Florida State League's shortstops with 76 errors in 1968.

=== Detroit Tigers ===
Gamble was eventually acquired by the Detroit Tigers in the 1970 Rule 5 draft. He spent the 1971 season with the Tigers' Double-A Montgomery Rebels, appearing in 137 games with a .252 batting average. In 1972, he was promoted to the Triple-A Toledo Mud Hens, appearing in 128 games with a .268 batting average.

In September 1972, Gamble was called up by the Tigers. He made his MLB debut for the franchise on September 7, 1972, at the age of 24, entering as a pinch hitter and popping out in foul territory during his only plate appearance in a 9–0 loss against the Baltimore Orioles. In his next four appearances, he was utilized only as a pinch runner. He then had two plate appearances in the final game he played that season on October 4, but went hitless and did not reach base. He also played seven innings at shortstop during that same game, his first and only major league appearance at defense. Although manager Billy Martin reportedly wanted Gamble to replace the injured Ed Brinkman for the 1972 postseason, he was not added to the playoff roster.

After spring training in 1973, Gamble returned to the Toledo Mud Hens. However, he was called up in mid-May 1973. At the time, manager Billy Martin complained about the lack of speed on the Tigers roster and noted: "[W]e definitely need some good baserunning. That's one thing Gamble can do – he can steal a base." Gamble played his first major league game of the 1973 season on May 16. After entering as a pinch runner in extra innings, he scored the winning run on a walk-off sacrifice fly by Mickey Stanley in what turned out to be the only run he would score in his major league career. He played in six more games – all as a pinch runner – before being sent back down to the minor leagues at the end of May and undergoing season-ending knee surgery shortly thereafter. Gamble played his final major league game on May 25, 1973, at the age of 25. Although he played 11 of his 13 major league games solely as a pinch runner, he did not attempt a stolen base. He continued playing in the minor leagues until retiring at the end of the 1976 season.

Gamble played for the Evansville Triplets from 1974 to 1976, shifting from utility infielder to third baseman. In 1975, he compiled a .288 batting average and stole 13 bases while leading Evansville to a pennant and the Junior World Series. He was released by the Tigers in the spring of 1977.

== Personal life ==
Gamble married Dawn Carter in 1969. Together, they had two children: Cory and Tawnya. They eventually divorced. After retiring from professional baseball, Gamble worked for Washoe County Parks until 2005. He also coached high school baseball and softball in his hometown.

Gamble died on September 1, 2022, while dove hunting with his family in Orovada, Nevada. He was 74, and had a cardiac event prior to his death.
