= Phil Meeler =

American baseball player (1948–2025)

- Pitcher
- Born: July 3, 1948; South Boston, Virginia, U.S.
- Died: August 19, 2025 (aged 77); Zebulon, North Carolina, U.S.
- Batted: Right Threw: Right

MLB debut
- May 10, 1972, for the Detroit Tigers

Last MLB appearance
- June 19, 1972, for the Detroit Tigers

MLB statistics
- Win–loss record: 0–1
- Earned run average: 4.32
- Strikeouts: 5
- Stats at Baseball Reference

Teams
- Detroit Tigers (1972)

Charles Philip Meeler (July 3, 1948 – August 19, 2025) was an American baseball pitcher who played in seven games for the Detroit Tigers in 1972. He made his major league debut on May 10, 1972, in a loss to the Chicago White Sox. Meeler died on August 19, 2025, at the age of 77.
