= Chuck Seelbach =

American baseball player (1948–2024)

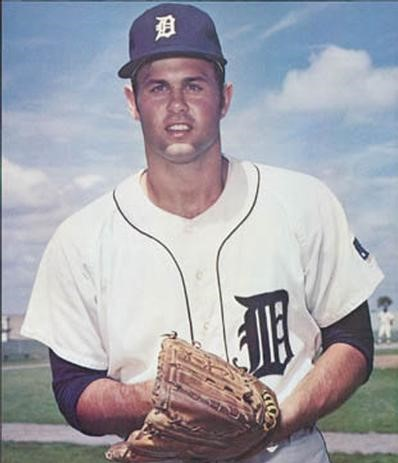
- Pitcher
- Born: March 20, 1948; Lakewood, Ohio, U.S.
- Died: March 22, 2024 (aged 76); Cleveland, Ohio, U.S.
- Batted: Right Threw: Right

MLB debut
- June 29, 1971, for the Detroit Tigers

Last MLB appearance
- May 23, 1974, for the Detroit Tigers

MLB statistics
- Win–loss record: 10–8
- Earned run average: 3.38
- Strikeouts: 79
- Stats at Baseball Reference

Teams
- Detroit Tigers (1971–1974)

Charles Frederick Seelbach (March 20, 1948 – March 22, 2024) was an American right-handed pitcher in Major League Baseball. He played for the Detroit Tigers between 1971 and 1974.

== Amateur career ==
In 1967, Seelbach played collegiate summer baseball with the Orleans Cardinals of the Cape Cod Baseball League, where he was named a league all-star and tossed a no-hitter against a Chatham team that included Thurman Munson. He played baseball at Dartmouth College from 1968 to 1970 and still ranks among Dartmouth's all-time leaders in winning percentage (.688), strikeouts (162), and shutouts (3).

== Professional career ==
Drafted by the Detroit Tigers in the 1st round (12th pick) of the 1970 Major League Baseball draft, Seelbach pitched four innings for the Tigers in 1971 and became the Tigers' closer in 1972, helping them win the American League East Championship.

In 1972, Seelbach had a 9–8 record with a 2.89 ERA and was among the American League leaders with 61 games (7th in the AL), 14 saves (7th in the AL), and 34 games finished (9th in the AL). On April 20, 1972, Seelbach combined with Tom Timmermann for a two-hitter but lost to the Baltimore Orioles, 1–0, on a home run by Paul Blair.

Seelbach was also on the mound when the Tigers clinched the American League East championship on October 3, 1972. Seelbach set down the Boston Red Sox 1-2-3 in the 9th inning to clinch the AL East title, as the game ended on a Ben Oglivie fly ball caught by Al Kaline in right field.

Seelbach pitched in two games of the 1972 American League Championship Series, allowing four hits and two runs for an 18.00 post-season earned run average. A shoulder injury the next year ended his appearance in the league. He pitched in only 7 innings in 1973 and 7 2/3 innings in 1974.

== Personal life ==
For over thirty-nine years, Seelbach was a European and American History teacher at his high school alma mater, University School, a preparatory school for boys in Hunting Valley, Ohio, a suburb of Cleveland. He retired from University School in May 2014 as one of the longest tenured educators in the School's history.

Seelbach was the father of Charles "Cory" Seelbach and Broadway actor Michael Seelbach. Chuck Seelbach died on March 22, 2024, just two days after his 76th birthday.
