= Jim Nettles =

American baseball player (born 1947)

- Outfielder
- Born: March 2, 1947 (age 79); San Diego, California, U.S.
- Batted: Left Threw: Left

Professional debut
- MLB: September 7, 1970, for the Minnesota Twins
- NPB: 1975, for the Nankai Hawks

Last appearance
- MLB: September 13, 1981, for the Oakland Athletics
- NPB: 1975, for the Nankai Hawks

MLB statistics
- Batting average: .220
- Home runs: 16
- Runs batted in: 57

NPB statistics
- Batting average: .234
- Home runs: 3
- Runs batted in: 19
- Stats at Baseball Reference

Teams
- Minnesota Twins (1970–1972); Detroit Tigers (1974); Nankai Hawks (1975); Kansas City Royals (1979); Oakland Athletics (1981)

James William Nettles (born March 2, 1947) is an American former professional baseball outfielder. He played all or part of six seasons in Major League Baseball, between 1970 and 1981, for the Minnesota Twins, Detroit Tigers, Kansas City Royals and Oakland Athletics. In 1975, he played for the Nankai Hawks of Nippon Professional Baseball. Following his playing career, Nettles managed in the minor leagues from 1983 until 1996. He is the younger brother of Graig Nettles.

== Career ==
=== Playing career ===
Nettles attended Will C. Crawford High School in San Diego, California, and San Diego State University, where he played college baseball for the San Diego State Aztecs. He also played collegiate summer baseball for the Alaska Goldpanners of the Alaska Baseball League. The Minnesota Twins of Major League Baseball (MLB) selected him in the fourth round of the 1968 MLB draft.

Nettles signed with the Twins, receiving a $12,000 signing bonus, and had a .285 batting average for the St. Cloud Rox of the Class A Northern League. He spent much of 1969 in the military, hitting .262 in 21 games for the Charlotte Hornets of the Class AA Southern League. In 1970, he played for the Evansville Triplets of the Class AAA American Association and batted .318, leading the team. Following the conclusion of Evansville's 1970 season, the Twins promoted Nettles to the major leagues in September 1970. He played in 13 games for the Twins before the season ended, batting 5-for-20 (.250).

Nettles began the 1971 season with the Portland Beavers of the Class AAA Pacific Coast League (PCL), and was promoted to the Twins to serve as a reserve outfielder and pinch hitter. He batted .270 with Portland and .250 with the Twins. He spent the entire 1972 season with Minnesota, but batted .204. In 1973, Nettles played for the Tacoma Twins of the PCL.

After the 1973 season, the Twins traded Nettles to the Detroit Tigers for Paul Jata. The Tigers assigned Nettles to Evansville, now their Class AAA affiliate. He opened the 1974 season with Evansville, and was promoted to the major leagues in July 1974, due to an injury to Willie Horton. He batted .227 in 43 games for the Tigers, and the team outrighted Nettles off of their 40-man roster after the 1974 season. In 1975, Nettles played for the Nankai Hawks of Nippon Professional Baseball's Pacific League.

Nettles signed with the Cleveland Indians organization in 1976. He did not make the team out of spring training and was released. He played for the Indios de Ciudad Juárez of the Mexican League that season, but batted .196. He spent the 1977 season with the Columbus Clippers, the Pittsburgh Pirates Class AAA affiliate. After the 1977 season, the Pirates traded Nettles and Paul Djakonow to the Kansas City Royals for Roger Nelson and Gary Martz. Nettles played for the Omaha Royals of the American Association in 1978 and 1979. In September 1979, the Royals promoted Nettles to the major leagues. He played in 11 games for Kansas City.

In 1980, Nettles played for Columbus, the New York Yankees Class AAA affiliate. The Oakland Athletics purchased Nettles before the 1981 season, and assigned him to the Tacoma Tigers of the PCL. He batted .241 for Tacoma during the 1981 season and the Athletics promoted Nettles to the major leagues in September. He appeared in one game for the 1981 Athletics. Nettles remained with the team in the 1981 MLB postseason, but was not on the active roster.

For his major league career, Nettles batted .220 with 16 home runs in 240 games played. He played for the Bradenton Explorers of the Senior Professional Baseball Association in 1989.

=== Managing career ===
Nettles served as a coach for Tacoma in the 1982 season. He stayed in the Athletics organization, becoming the manager of the Idaho Falls A's in the Pioneer League, managing them in 1983 and 1984. The next season, Nettles became the manager of the Madison Muskies. He managed in Madison through the 1989 season, when he sought to move back closer to his home in Tacoma, Washington.

In 1990, Nettles became the manager of the Peninsula Pilots, a Class A affiliate of the Seattle Mariners. He managed the Jacksonville Suns of the Southern League in 1991. After the season, the Mariners opted not to renew Nettles' contract. The Toronto Blue Jays hired Nettles to manage the Medicine Hat Blue Jays in the Pioneer League for the 1992 season. He managed in Hagerstown Suns of the Class A South Atlantic League in 1993 and the Dunedin Blue Jays of the Class A-Advanced Florida State League in 1994 and 1995. The Blue Jays did not retain Nettles following the 1995 season.

In 1996, Nettles managed the Amarillo Dillas of the Texas–Louisiana League, until he was fired in August. The Royals hired him as a bullpen catcher and batting practice pitcher. He was the hitting coach for the Spokane Indians of the Class A Short Season Northwest League in 2005 and 2006.

== Personal life ==
Jim is the younger brother of former major league third baseman Graig Nettles. Graig played college baseball for San Diego State and began his MLB career with the Twins before Jim. Nettles has two children. He is the father-in-law of Mike Sweeney.

Nettles settled in Tacoma after first playing there in 1973. Nettles was diagnosed with prostate cancer in 2007; Graig was also diagnosed with it after Jim told him that he should get tested.
