= Fred Holdsworth =

American baseball player (born 1952)

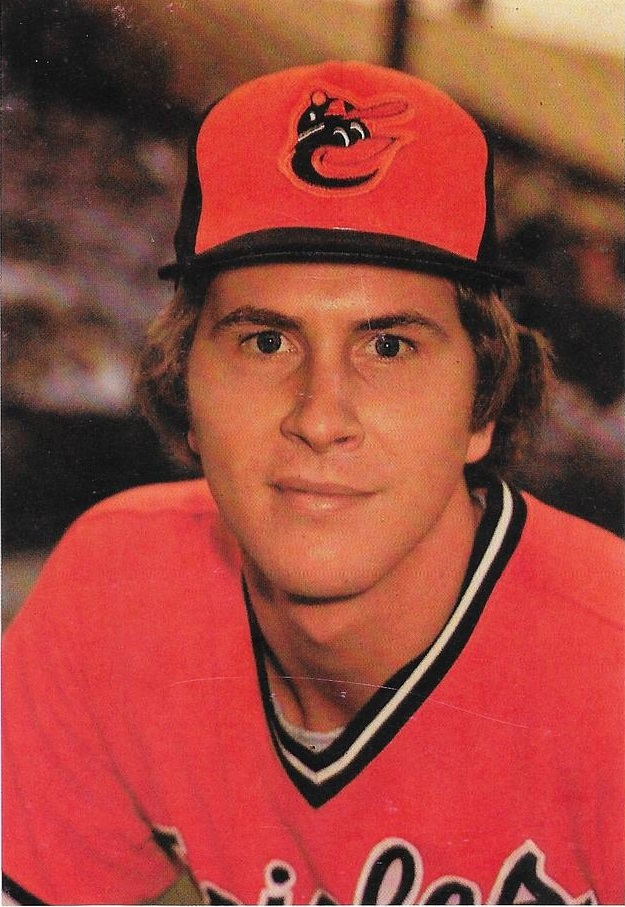
- Pitcher
- Born: May 29, 1952 (age 73); Detroit, Michigan, U.S.
- Batted: Right Threw: Right

MLB debut
- July 27, 1972, for the Detroit Tigers

Last MLB appearance
- September 21, 1980, for the Milwaukee Brewers

MLB statistics
- Win–loss record: 7–10
- Earned run average: 4.40
- Strikeouts: 94
- Stats at Baseball Reference

Teams
- Detroit Tigers (1972–1974); Baltimore Orioles (1976–1977); Montreal Expos (1977–1978); Milwaukee Brewers (1980)

Frederick William Holdsworth (born May 29, 1952) is an American former right-handed pitcher in Major League Baseball.

== Biography ==
Born in Detroit, Holdsworth was drafted by the Detroit Tigers as a high school senior on June 4, 1970. Although he had been class valedictorian, Holdsworth turned down several baseball and football scholarships to sign with the Tigers. When he made his debut with the Tigers on July 27, 1972, he was the youngest player in the American League. Holdsworth played three seasons for the Tigers but never won a game for the team, going 0–5 in 15 appearances.

On May 29, 1975, the Tigers traded Holdsworth to the Baltimore Orioles for Bob Reynolds. Holdsworth did not play at the major league level in 1975, but he became an effective relief pitcher with good control in a partial season for Baltimore in 1976, compiling a 4–1 record and saving two with a 2.04 ERA (Adjusted ERA+ of 160) in 16 games.

After a rocky start in 12 appearances in 1977, the Orioles traded him to the Montreal Expos on his 25th birthday—May 29, 1977. Holdsworth pitched well for the Expos in 1977, going 3–3 with a 3.19 ERA (119 Adjusted ERA+). Holdsworth's ERA ballooned to 7.27 in six games with the 1978 Expos, and he was released on January 17, 1979.

The Tigers signed Holdsworth as a free agent on February 20, 1979, but he did not make the major league roster in 1979. On December 4, 1979, the Tigers sold Holdsworth to the Milwaukee Brewers. He finished his major league career playing in nine games, with a 4.58 ERA and no decisions, for the 1980 Brewers. After retiring from baseball, Holdsworth became an accountant. In August 2005, he was elevated to vice president of finance at Comcast Cable's Midwest division in Bingham Farms, Michigan.
