= Don Leshnock =

American baseball player (1946–2012)

- Pitcher
- Born: November 25, 1946; Youngstown, Ohio, U.S.
- Died: May 5, 2012 (aged 65); Raleigh, North Carolina, U.S.
- Batted: Right Threw: Left

MLB debut
- June 7, 1972, for the Detroit Tigers

Last MLB appearance
- June 7, 1972, for the Detroit Tigers

MLB statistics
- Win–loss record: 0–0
- Earned run average: 0.00
- Strikeouts: 2
- Stats at Baseball Reference

Teams
- Detroit Tigers (1972)

Career highlights and awards
- Inducted into the Youngstown State Athletic Hall of Fame (1986)

Donald Lee Leshnock (November 25, 1946 – May 5, 2012) was an American professional baseball left-handed pitcher, who played in Major League Baseball (MLB) for the Detroit Tigers, in 1972.

Leshnock’s entire big league career consisted of one inning of relief, for Detroit, on June 7, 1972, when the Tigers hosted the California Angels. He did not allow an earned run, giving up two hits, and no walks, while striking out two of the five batters he faced.

Leshnock attended Youngstown State University, where he played college baseball for the Penguins, (1965, Junior Varsity) and (1966–1968, Varsity) and was inducted into the Youngstown State Athletic Hall of Fame, in 1986.

Besides Leshnock‘s brief MLB stint, he pitched eight seasons of Minor League Baseball, from 1968 to 1975.

== Early years ==
A native of Youngstown, Ohio, Leshnock played high school baseball for Ursuline High School. He subsequently played college baseball for Youngstown State University from 1966 to 1968. Leshnock ranks second in Youngstown State history, with a career earned run average of 1.61. He gave up his senior of eligibility to sign a contract to play professional baseball in the Detroit Tigers organization. Leshnock was drafted by the Tigers, in the 23rd round (527th overall) of the 1968 draft, and was signed by Detroit scout Cy Williams.

== Minor leagues (1968–1972) ==
Before being called up to the Tigers in 1972, Leshnock played in Detroit's minor league system for the Lakeland Tigers (1968–1869), Rocky Mount Leafs (1969–1970), Montgomery Rebels (1971), and Toledo Mud Hens (1972). He pitched a no-hitter for Rocky Mount in 1970. In 1971, he compiled a 7–3 record with 110 strikeouts in 101 innings for Montgomery. After the 1971 season, the Tigers sent Leshnock to the Winter Instructional League in Dunedin, Florida, where he opened the winter season with a one-hitter against the Twins.

== Detroit Tigers ==
The Tigers purchased Leshnock from the Mud Hens at the end of May 1972. On June 7, 1972, Leshnock appeared in his only MLB game, a 5-1 loss to the California Angels, at Tiger Stadium. Leshnock pitched the ninth inning for the Tigers, giving up two hits while also striking out two batters and allowing no earned runs. One of the batters he struck out was Nolan Ryan, who got the win in the game while allowing only three hits.

Leshnock's stay in the major leagues proved to be merely a cup of coffee, as he was returned to the Mud Hens in July 1972, and finished the year pitching in the minors.

== Minor leagues (1973–1975) ==
In October 1972, Leshnock was sold by the Tigers along with catcher Tom Haller to the Philadelphia Phillies, though neither player ever appeared in a game for the Phillies. Leshnock played three more years of minor league baseball for the Eugene Emeralds (1973), Charleston Charlies (1974–1975), Jacksonville Suns (1975), and Shreveport Captains (1975).

== Later years ==
In 1986, Leshnock was inducted into the Youngstown State Athletic Hall of Fame. At the time, he was called "one of the greatest ever to don a Penguin baseball uniform."

His son, Donnie Leshnock, was drafted by the New York Yankees in the fifth round of the 1992 Major League Baseball June Amateur Draft and played four years in the Yankees' minor league organization from 1993 to 1996.

Leshnock was a longtime resident of Raleigh, North Carolina, where he died of bladder cancer, in 2012, at the age of 65.
