= John Knox (baseball) =

American baseball player (born 1948)

- Second baseman
- Born: July 26, 1948 (age 78); Newark, New Jersey
- Batted: Left Threw: Right

MLB debut
- August 1, 1972, for the Detroit Tigers

Last MLB appearance
- September 26, 1975, for the Detroit Tigers

MLB statistics
- Batting average: .274
- Home runs: 0
- Runs batted in: 11
- Stats at Baseball Reference

Teams
- Detroit Tigers (1972–1975)

John Clinton Knox (born July 26, 1948) is an American former professional baseball player. He was a second baseman who played in four seasons with the Detroit Tigers from 1972 to 1975. He batted left-handed, threw right-handed, stood 6 feet (1.8 m) tall and weighed 170 pounds (77 kg).

== Early years ==
Knox was born in 1948 in Newark, New Jersey. He grew up in Pittsburgh and then moved to Columbus, Ohio, where he attended Upper Arlington High School. He attended Bowling Green State University. As a senior, he played second base, hit .370 with a .990 fielding percentage, and won All-MAC first-team honors. He also won third-team All-America honors in 1970.

== Professional baseball ==
Knox was drafted by the Detroit Tigers in the eighth round of the 1970 Major League Baseball draft. He was assigned to the Single A Batavia Trojans of the New York-Pennsylvania League for the 1970 season. He appeared in 70 games and compiled a .315 batting average and .437 on-base percentage in his professional baseball debut.

In 1971, Knox was promoted to the Montgomery Rebels of the Double A Dixie Association. He appeared in 128 games for Montgomery, batting .271 with a .368 on-base percentage.

In 1972, Knox was again promoted, this time to the Toledo Mud Hens of the International League. He appeared in 113 games, batting .294 with a .374 on-base percentage. He was then called up by the Tigers and made his major-league debut on August 1, 1972. He appeared in 14 games with the Tigers in 1972, compiling a .077 batting average in 12 at-bats.

Knox began the 1973 season with Toledo. He was called up by the Tigers and appeared in 12 games with a .281 batting average in 32 at-bats. He spent most of the 1973 season at Toledo, appearing in 106 games with a .274 batting average and .367 on-base percentage.

In 1974, Knox saw his most extensive major-league playing time, appearing in 55 games, including 33 games at second base. He compiled a .307 batting average and .351 on-base percentage in 95 plate appearances.

In 1975, Knox again spent the full season with the Tigers. He appeared in 43 games, including 23 games at second base. His batting average dipped by 40 points to .267 though he maintained a strong .344 on-base percentage. He appeared in his final major-league game on September 26, 1975.

Knox spent the 1976 season in the minor leagues. Knox initially refused to report to the minor leagues and told the press in March 1976: "Thy never have really given me a shot. Now they want me to go to Evansville. I never have played more than two games in a row at Detroit. You never really get in a groove that way. . . . I think I hit major league pitching pretty well. . . . A few years ago, I was a solid prospect. Now I have never been given a chance to make it. They want to send me back." He began the season with the Double-as Evansville Triplets, but was traded early in the season to the Cincinnati Reds who assigned Knox to the Triple-A Indianapolix Indians.

During his four years in Major League Baseball, Knox appeared in 124 games, all for the Tigers, 69 at second base. Knox had a career batting average of .274 with a .335 on-base percentage, 60 hits, 21 runs, 11 RBIs, and seven stolen bases.

== Later years ==
After his playing career, Knox worked for Alco Aluminum in Toledo, Ohio. Knox was inducted into the Bowling Green Athletic Hall of Fame in 1977.
