= Jim Campbell (baseball executive) =

American baseball executive (1924–1995)

- Campbell at Tiger Stadium
- Executive
- Born: February 5, 1924; Huron, Ohio, U.S.
- Died: October 31, 1995 (aged 71); Lakeland, Florida, U.S.

Teams
- As general manager: Detroit Tigers (1962–1983); As president: Detroit Tigers (1978–1990); As chairman: Detroit Tigers (1990–1992)

Career highlights and awards
- 2× World Series champion (1968, 1984); The Sporting News Executive of the Year Award (1968)

James Arthur Campbell (February 5, 1924 – October 31, 1995) was an American Major League Baseball executive. He worked for the Detroit Tigers for 43 seasons from 1949 to 1992. He was the team's general manager from September 1962 to September 1983, its president from August 1978 to January 1990, and its chairman from January 1990 to August 1992. The Tigers won two World Series championships (1968 and 1984) during Campbell's tenure with the club. He was selected as the Major League Baseball executive of the year in 1968 and was inducted into the Michigan Sports Hall of Fame in 1985.

== Early years ==
Campbell was born in 1924 in Huron, Ohio, and played four sports at Huron High School. His father died after being injured in an electrical accident while Campbell was still in high school. Campbell enrolled at Ohio State University in 1942 and played freshman football. He served in the United States Navy Air Corps from 1943 to 1946 before returning to Ohio State. He played as an outfielder for the Ohio State Buckeyes baseball team for three years before graduating in 1949 with a bachelor's degree in commerce.

== Detroit Tigers ==
Campbell joined the Tigers organization in 1949 as the business manager of the Class D (equivalent to Rookie-level today) Thomasville Tigers in Thomasville, Georgia. The stadium in Thomasville burned to the ground after the first game of Campbell's tenure. Campbell gained praise for keeping the team playing with borrowed uniforms and overseeing the prompt reconstruction of the stadium.

Campbell was promoted to business manager of the Tigers' farm system in 1952. In 1957, Campbell became the major-league team's business manager, and in 1959 he became a vice president. In September 1962, at age 38, he became the team's general manager.

Notable moves and accomplishments during Campbell's tenure as the Tigers' general manager include the following:

- In April 1963, Campbell claimed Denny McLain off first-year waivers from the Chicago White Sox. McLain won 104 games for the Tigers from 1965 to 1969, including a 31-win season in 1968.
- Campbell assembled the 1968 Tigers team that won the 1968 World Series. In November 1968, Campbell was selected by The Sporting News as the Major League Baseball Executive of the Year following a poll of major league presidents and general managers.
- In October 1970, Campbell negotiated an eight-player trade that sent Denny McLain to the Washington Senators in exchange for pitcher Joe Coleman, shortstop Eddie Brinkman and third baseman Aurelio Rodriguez. McLain and the other players sent to Washington fizzled, while Coleman won 62 games from 1971 to 1973 and Brinkman and Rodriguez anchored the left side of Detroit's infield for much of the 1970s.
- In 1971, Campbell hired Billy Martin as the Tigers' manager. Martin led an aging Detroit team to 91 wins in 1971 and to the American League East championship in 1972. Campbell then fired Martin in September 1973.
- In June 1978, Campbell selected Kirk Gibson with the Tigers' first-round pick in the 1978 baseball draft. Gibson became a key player in the Detroit team that won the 1984 World Series.
- In June 1979, Campbell hired Sparky Anderson as the Tigers' manager. Campbell signed Anderson to a 5 1/2-year contract that was, at the time, "the longest, richest contract they have ever given any manager." Anderson remained the Tigers manager through the 1995 season and was selected as the AL Manager of the Year in 1984 and 1987.
- In June 1980, Campbell announced that he was closing the bleachers at Tiger Stadium due to rowdyism. He said at the time: "I'm just goddamn fed up with them. I'm sick and tired. It's dangerous. It gives the city a bad name."

In August 1978, he added the title of team president. However, he had been operating head of the franchise for some time before then. Owner John Fetzer had been nominal president since buying controlling interest in 1961, but mostly left the team in Campbell's hands and rarely interfered.

In February 1982, Campbell underwent heart bypass surgery, and he was hospitalized briefly in August 1983 after experiencing dizziness. In September 1983, and acting on his doctor's advice, Campbell stepped down as general manager, turning over that role to longtime assistant Bill Lajoie. However, he remained as the club's president, adding the title of chief executive officer. Fetzer sold the Tigers to Tom Monaghan in 1983; like Fetzer, Monaghan largely left day-to-day operations to Campbell.

In February 1985, Campbell was inducted into the Michigan Sports Hall of Fame. In January 1990, Campbell, at age 65, stepped down as the Tigers' president; former Michigan Wolverines football coach Bo Schembechler replaced him. (Schembechler had retired from Michigan weeks earlier.) Campbell remained as chairman and chief executive officer and continued to maintain an office at Tiger Stadium. After Monaghan agreed to sell the team to Mike Ilitch, Monaghan fired both Campbell and Schembechler in August 1992.

=== Record as general manager ===
Team	Year	Regular season					Postseason			
Team	Year	Games	Won	Lost	Win %	Finish	Won	Lost	Win %	Result
DET	1963	162	79	83	.488	5th in AL	–	–	–	–
DET	1964	163	85	77	.525	4th in AL	–	–	–	–
DET	1965	162	89	73	.549	4th in AL	–	–	–	–
DET	1966	162	88	74	.543	3rd in AL	–	–	–	–
DET	1967	163	91	71	.562	2nd in AL	–	–	–	–
DET	1968	162	103	59	.636	1st in AL	4	3	.571	Won World Series (STL)
DET	1969	162	90	72	.556	2nd in AL East	–	–	–	–
DET	1970	162	79	83	.488	4th in AL East	–	–	–	–
DET	1971	162	91	71	.562	2nd in AL East	–	–	–	–
DET	1972	156	86	70	.551	1st in AL East	2	3	.400	Lost ALCS (OAK)
DET	1973	162	85	77	.525	3rd in AL East	–	–	–	–
DET	1974	162	72	90	.444	6th in AL East	–	–	–	–
DET	1975	159	57	102	.358	6th in AL East	–	–	–	–
DET	1976	161	74	87	.460	5th in AL East	–	–	–	–
DET	1977	162	74	88	.457	4th in AL East	–	–	–	–
DET	1978	162	86	76	.531	5th in AL East	–	–	–	–
DET	1979	161	85	76	.528	5th in AL East	–	–	–	–
DET	1980	163	84	78	.519	4th in AL East	–	–	–	–
DET	1981	57	31	26	.544	4th in AL East	–	–	–	–
DET	1981	52	29	23	.558	2nd in AL East	–	–	–	–
DET	1982	162	83	79	.512	4th in AL East	–	–	–	–
DET	1983	162	92	70	.568	2nd in AL East	–	–	–	–
Total		3,341	1,733	1,605	.519		6	6	.500	

== Family and later years ==
Campbell was married in 1954 to Helene Grace Mulligan of Lakewood, Ohio. They were divorced in 1969. Campbell later blamed his devotion to the Tigers for the divorce. He recalled in 1989: "I've worked for this club for 40 years, and I've had very few days off. I'm talking about weekends and everything." After being fired in 1992, Campbell did not return to Tiger Stadium. In October 1995, he suffered a heart attack in Lakeland, Florida, and died at the Lakeland Regional Health Medical Center at age 71.

Preceded by Rick Ferrell	Detroit Tigers general manager 1963–1983	Succeeded by Bill Lajoie
Preceded by John Fetzer	Detroit Tigers president 1978–1990	Succeeded by Bo Schembechler
