= Lerrin LaGrow =

American baseball player (born 1948)

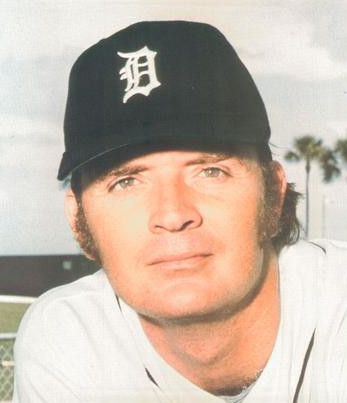
- LaGrow in 1975
- Pitcher
- Born: July 8, 1948 (age 78); Phoenix, Arizona, U.S.
- Batted: Right Threw: Right

MLB debut
- July 28, 1970, for the Detroit Tigers

Last MLB appearance
- July 14, 1980, for the Philadelphia Phillies

MLB statistics
- Win–loss record: 34–55
- Earned run average: 4.11
- Strikeouts: 375
- Saves: 54
- Stats at Baseball Reference

Teams
- Detroit Tigers (1970, 1972–1975); St. Louis Cardinals (1976); Chicago White Sox (1977–1979); Los Angeles Dodgers (1979); Philadelphia Phillies (1980)

Lerrin Harris LaGrow (born July 8, 1948) is an American former professional baseball pitcher, who played 10 seasons in Major League Baseball (MLB) with the Detroit Tigers (1970), (1972–1975), St. Louis Cardinals (1976), Chicago White Sox (1977–1979), Los Angeles Dodgers (1979), and Philadelphia Phillies (1980).

== Biography ==
=== Early career ===
Born in Phoenix, Arizona, LaGrow attended Glendale High School (Glendale, Arizona) and then Arizona State University in 1968 and 1969 before beginning his professional baseball career. He was the Southern League's Player of the Year in 1970. The Tigers brought LaGrow up in July 1970, and he compiled a 7.30 earned run average in 10 relief appearances. After spending the 1971 season in the minor leagues, LaGrow rejoined the Tigers in 1972 and 1973, appearing in 37 games, 34 of which were in relief.

=== Bert Campaneris bat throwing incident: 1972 ALCS ===
In 1972, LaGrow had a 1.32 earned run average (Adjusted ERA+ of 240) in 16 games, also pitching one scoreless inning in Game 2 of the 1972 American League Championship Series against the Oakland Athletics. LaGrow's single inning led to one of the most memorable moments of the series. In the bottom of the seventh inning, Bert Campaneris came to bat, having had three hits, two runs scored and two stolen bases in his first three at-bats. LaGrow's first pitch hit Campaneris in the ankle. Campaneris staggered for a moment, glared at LaGrow, then flung his bat toward the mound; LaGrow was able to duck in time and avoid getting hit. Both benches cleared but no brawl ensued. Tigers' manager Billy Martin had to be restrained by umpires and teammates to prevent him from going after Campaneris. LaGrow and Campaneris were suspended for the rest of the ALCS.

=== Starting pitcher: 1974–1975 ===
In 1974 and 1975, LaGrow became part of the Tigers' starting rotation, starting 34 games in 1974 and 26 games in 1975. In 1974, LaGrow was 8–19, and in 1975 his record was 7–14.

=== White Sox relief ace: 1977–1978 ===
In April 1976, the Tigers sold LaGrow's contract to the St. Louis Cardinals. LaGrow pitched in eight games for the Cardinals during the 1976 season with a 1.48 earned run average. He was traded from the Cardinals to the Chicago White Sox for Clay Carroll during spring training on March 23, 1977. He became their ace reliever in 1977 and 1978. He appeared in a career high 66 games in 1977 and another 52 in 1978. In 1977, he had 25 saves, third best in the American League. He was also among the league leaders in saves in 1978 with 16.

He finished his career with the Dodgers and Phillies. In ten seasons, LaGrow had a 34–55 record in 309 games (67 as a starter), with 19 complete games, two shutouts, 140 games finished, 54 saves, 779 innings pitched, 814 hits, 74 home runs and 312 walks allowed, 375 strikeouts, a 4.11 ERA and a 1.445 WHIP.
