= Tom Timmermann =

American baseball player (1940–2025)

- Pitcher
- Born: May 12, 1940; Breese, Illinois, U.S.
- Died: November 14, 2025 (aged 85); Northville, Michigan, U.S.
- Batted: Right Threw: Right

MLB debut
- June 18, 1969, for the Detroit Tigers

Last MLB appearance
- April 26, 1974, for the Cleveland Indians

MLB statistics
- Win–loss record: 35–35
- Earned run average: 3.78
- Strikeouts: 315
- Stats at Baseball Reference

Teams
- Detroit Tigers (1969–1973); Cleveland Indians (1973–1974)

Thomas Henry Timmermann (May 12, 1940 – November 14, 2025) was an American baseball player. He played professional baseball for 15 years from 1960 to 1974, including six seasons in Major League Baseball as a pitcher for the Detroit Tigers (1969–1973) and Cleveland Indians (1973–1974). He compiled a 35–35 win–loss record and a 3.78 earned run average (ERA), and recorded 35 saves and 315 strikeouts, in 228 major league games and 548 innings pitched.

After setting a Detroit club record with 61 pitching appearances in 1970, all as a relief specialist, Timmermann was voted "Tiger of the Year" by the Detroit chapter of the Baseball Writers' Association of America. During a minor league game in 1968, he tied a professional baseball record by recording the maximum of 27 infield outs in a nine-inning game for the Criollas de Caguas in the Puerto Rican Winter League.

== Early life ==
Timmermann was born in Breese, Illinois on May 12, 1940. He grew up on a dirt farm on the Illinois prairie, attended Aviston High School and subsequently enrolled in Southern Illinois University Carbondale. While at Carbondale he became a member of Sigma Pi fraternity.

== Professional baseball ==
=== Minor leagues ===
Timmermann was signed by the Detroit Tigers as an amateur free agent in 1960 and spent nine-and-a-half years in the Tigers' farm system before making his major league debut. He began his minor league career in 1960 with the Montgomery Rebels and had stints with the Durham Bulls (1960, 1965), Duluth–Superior Dukes (1961), Knoxville Smokies (1962–63), Syracuse Chiefs (1963–66), Hawaii Islanders (1964), and Toledo Mud Hens (1967–1971). In October 1968, while playing for the Criollas de Caguas in the Puerto Rican Winter League, Timmermann pitched eight shutouts, including a five-hitter in which he recorded 12 strikeouts among 27 infield outs.

=== Detroit Tigers ===
Timmermann was tall — 6 feet 4 inches (1.93 m) — and weighed 215 pounds. He made his major league debut on June 18, 1969, holding the New York Yankees hitless in 1-1/3 innings as a relief pitcher. As a 28-year-old rookie in 1969, Timmermann had a 2.75 earned run average (ERA), well below the league average 3.74, and a 4-3 win–loss record in 31 games (30 as a reliever).

In 1970, and despite being demoted to Toledo for 26 days early in the season, Timmermann finished third in the American League with 27 saves and sixth in the league with 43 games finished. He appeared in 61 games, all as a relief specialist, breaking the Detroit franchise record of 55 pitching appearances set by Larry Sherry in 1966. Timmermann compiled a record of 6–7 with a 4.11 ERA. He was credited with converting a bullpen that manager Mayo Smith had called "the worst I've ever seen in baseball" into one that became "almost unbeatable." In one sequence of 11 games in June and July, Timmermann recorded nine saves and two wins. At the end of the 1970 season, Timmermann was voted "Tiger of the Year" by the Detroit chapter of the Baseball Writers' Association of America — garnering 25% of the votes to edge Mickey Stanley and Al Kaline. In November 1970, veteran Detroit sports writer Watson Spoelstra called Timmermann's 1970 performance "the strongest bullpen job ever achieved in Detroit."

In 1971, Timmermann appeared in 52 games (two as a starter), compiling a 7–6 record and a 3.86 ERA. In 1972, the Tigers moved Timmermann into the starting rotation, and he started 25 games and made nine relief appearances. He compiled an 8–10 record in 1972 with a 2.89 ERA.

=== Cleveland Indians ===
On June 15, 1973, the Tigers traded Timmermann to the Cleveland Indians in exchange for Ed Farmer. Timmermann started 15 games for the Indians in 1973 and made 14 relief appearances, finishing with a record of 8–7. Timmermann pitched only four games for the Indians in 1974. He played his final major league game on April 26, 1974. He concluded his professional baseball career in 1974 playing for the Toledo Mudhens and Oklahoma City 89ers.

== Death ==
Timmermann died on November 14, 2025, at the age of 85.
