= Gates Brown =

American baseball player and coach (1939–2013)

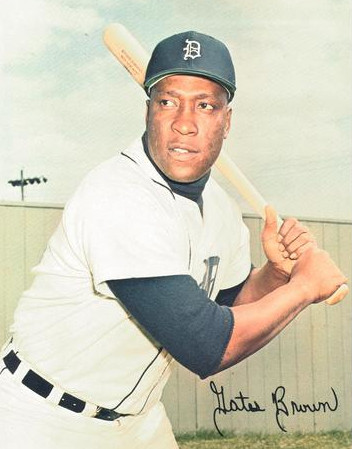
- Brown in 1966
- Left fielder
- Born: May 2, 1939; Crestline, Ohio, U.S.
- Died: September 27, 2013 (aged 74); Detroit, Michigan, U.S.
- Batted: Left Threw: Right

MLB debut
- June 19, 1963, for the Detroit Tigers

Last MLB appearance
- September 26, 1975, for the Detroit Tigers

MLB statistics
- Batting average: .257
- Home runs: 84
- Runs batted in: 322
- Stats at Baseball Reference

Teams
- Detroit Tigers (1963–1975)

Career highlights and awards
- 2× World Series champion (1968, 1984)

William James "Gates" Brown (May 2, 1939 – September 27, 2013) was an American Major League Baseball left fielder who spent his entire career with the Detroit Tigers (1963–1975). He batted left-handed and threw right-handed.

== Early life ==
Brown was born in 1939 in Crestline, Ohio. He attended Crestline High School and played tailback for the school's football team. Brown also played baseball in Pony League, American Legion, sandlot and high school competition. He played at the catcher position, a position his father had also played.

After his sophomore year, Brown "got in with the wrong crowd" and spent his junior year at the Boys Industrial School for juvenile offenders in Lancaster, Ohio. He returned to Crestline High for his senior year, but he was not permitted to compete in sports.

At age 18, he was arrested and convicted of burglary. He was sentenced to prison at the Ohio State Reformatory in Mansfield, Ohio, where he was confined for 22 months from 1958 to 1959. He was encouraged by a prison guard who also coached the reformatory's baseball team to join the squad as a catcher. The coach contacted several major-league teams after being impressed by Brown's batting ability. Tigers scouts Frank Skaff and Pat Mullin helped Brown get paroled a year early and signed him for US$7,000. He chose to join the Tigers despite interest from other teams such as the Chicago White Sox and Cleveland Indians. He explained, "The primary reasons I signed with Detroit is because they didn't have any black players and eventually I figured they would, plus, I had been told about the short right porch at Tiger Stadium."

== Baseball career ==
=== Minor leagues ===
After signing with the Tigers, Brown spent four years in the team's farm system. He began his professional baseball career in 1960 with the Class C Duluth-Superior Dukes of the Northern League. In his first season, he played in the outfield, compiled a .293 batting average with 10 home runs and 68 RBIs, and was selected for the All-Star team. He also ranked among the Northern League's leaders with 13 triples (first), 30 stolen bases (second), and 105 runs scored (second). He also played winter league ball at Tampa in 1961.

In 1961, Brown was promoted to the Class-B Durham Bulls of the Carolina League. He appeared in 118 games with Durham, compiling a league-best .324 batting average with 15 home runs and 72 RBIs. He was promoted late in the season to the Class-A Knoxville Smokies of the South Atlantic League. He was selected to the All-Carolina League team, received a "Player of the Month" award in August 1961, and was named the "Most Popular Smoky". He played winter ball at Dunedin in 1962.

In 1962, Brown was promoted to the Class-AAA Denver Bears of the American Association. He appeared in 139 games with Denver, hitting .300 and scored 73 runs. He hit only four home runs in Denver. After the season, Brown noted that he was swinging just as hard as ever, but "the ball just didn't get up in the air for me."

Brown began the 1963 season with the Class-AAA Syracuse Chiefs of the International League. He hit .257 with 13 home runs and 43 RBIs in 60 games. He was described in The Post-Standard as one of "the most crowd-pleasing players ever to play for the Syracuse Chiefs.

=== Detroit Tigers ===
==== 1963 and 1964 seasons ====
Brown was called up from Syracuse on June 17, 1963. Two days later, on June 19, Brown hit a pinch-hit home run deep into the right field seats at Fenway Park in Boston, becoming the 11th American League batter to hit a home run in his first at bat. He was the third player in American League history to hit a pinch-hit home run in their first at bat. In his second appearance, he hit a clutch single to drive in the winning run in the ninth inning of a game against the Kansas City Athletics. He appeared in 55 games for the Tigers in 1963, including 12 starts in left field and the remainder as a pinch hitter.

In 1964, Brown spent his first full season in the major leagues, appearing in 123 games, including 101 games as the Tigers' starting left fielder. He compiled a .262 batting average with 43 extra-base hits. He posted career-highs in home runs (15), RBIs (54), runs (65), hits (116), doubles (22), triples (6), stolen bases (11) and at bats (426) in 123 games.

==== 1965–1967 ====
In 1965, Brown started 44 games at left field, but eventually lost the starting spot to 21-year-old Willie Horton who tallied 29 home runs and 104 RBIs in his first full season in the majors. He also totaled 43 RBIs in 227 at bats, an impressive average of an RBI for every 5.7 appearances.

Frustrated with the lack of playing time, Brown said early in spring training in 1966 that he wished the Tigers would let him go. Horton tallied over 100 RBIs and held the left field spot for the second straight year; Brown was limited to 33 games as the starting left fielder in 1966 and was used primarily as a pinch hitter. He compiled a .266 overall batting average but excelled with a .325 average in the pinch-hitting role.

As the 1967 got underway, Brown again expressed disappointment at his role sitting on the bench for the past two seasons. In an interview with Joe Falls, Brown said:

When I was in the minors I used to say that I'd do anything to get to the majors. Even if it meant sitting on the bench, I didn't care. But now I'm here, I've been here five years, and I guess you change in time. Now I'm not content to sit any more. I want to play. I want to help the team, and I want to help myself. . . . I get down a lot. I guess that's only human. But I made up my mind from the very beginning that if I ever played on a team where a player caused dissension, that player would never be me.

With injuries to Horton early in the 1967 season, Brown was called on to start 17 games early in the 1967 season. However, in June, Brown dislocated a bone in his left wrist crashing into the outfield wall while trying to field a fly ball. He remained on the injured list until the final month of the season. On the season, he appeared in only 51 games, and his batting average dropped to a career-low .187 in 91 at bats.

==== 1968 season ====
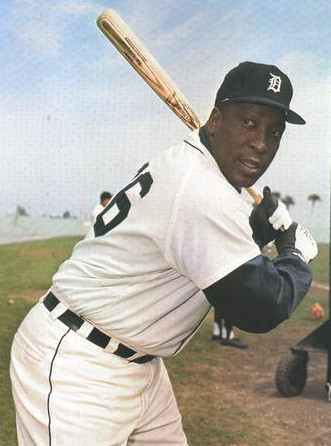
Brown, circa 1967

Brown had an outstanding season in 1968, helping the Tigers win the American League pennant and the World Series. While 1968 was called the Year of the Pitcher, Brown tallied a batting average of .370 — 140 points higher than the American League average of .230. Brown started only 17 games that season, but appeared in 49 more as a pinch hitter. He also achieved a .442 on-base percentage and a .685 slugging average and struck out only four times in 104 at bats. As a pinch hitter, Brown hit for a .450 batting average, the eighth-highest single season batting average for a pinch hitter (minimum 30 at bats) in major league history.

His pinch hits were key in leading the Tigers to the pennant. By early June, he had registered eight hits in 12 pinch hitting at bats. He hit especially well against rival Boston Red Sox. On April 11, he had a pinch-hit home run in the ninth inning to lead the Tigers to a 4–3 victory over the Red Sox. He hit another pinch-hit home run against the Sox on August 10. Brown's mastery of the Sox peaked in an August 11 double-header before a crowd of 49,087 at Tiger Stadium. In the first game, he hit a game-winning home run in the 14th inning to deliver a 5–4 victory. In the second game, he again had the game-winning RBI in the ninth inning.

Brown also won over fans with his "every man" charisma. On August 7, 1968, after grabbing two hot dogs from the clubhouse, Brown was ordered by manager Mayo Smith to pinch hit. He notoriously stuffed the hot dogs in his jersey to hide them from his manager. "I always wanted to get a hit every time I went to the plate. But this was one time I didn't want to get a hit. I'll be damned if I didn't smack one in the gap and I had to slide into second — head first, no less. I was safe with a double. But when I stood up, I had mustard and ketchup and smashed hot dogs and buns all over me. The fielders took one look at me, turned their backs and damned near busted a gut laughing at me. My teammates in the dugout went crazy." After fining Brown $100, Smith said, "What the hell were you doing eating on the bench in the first place?" Brown replied, "I decided to tell him the truth. I said, 'I was hungry. Besides, where else can you eat a hot dog and have the best seat in the house'"

In August 1968, Detroit Free Press columnist Joe Falls wrote:

"Gates Brown. Everybody's favorite. Anyone who has to struggle in life -- and that's just about all of us -- can relate to this guy. Because nobody has reached the top through a more trying route than Gates Brown. And nobody is happier to be here than Gates Brown.
He waddles out to leftfield. That's you playing softball. He stumbles in for a fly ball, lunges and catches it at the last moment. That's you, all right. He rips a triple over the centerfielder's head and raced to third like a runaway fire hydrant. It could be the moment in the office picnic."

Los Angeles Times sportswriter Jim Murray wrote in September 1968 that Brown had "the most level swing since Joe DiMaggio and added:

He's batting .459 as a pinch hitter. He hits the "A" pitches farther than some guys hit the batting practice pitches. He strikes out so seldom that pitchers are convinced he could get wood on a cultured pearl, or a machine gun bullet."

California Angels manager Bill Rigney said: "When I think of Gates Brown, I think of loud noises and line drives. When my pitchers ask me what to do with him, I say, 'Duck'!"

==== Later years ====
In 1969, Brown's batting average dropped by more than 160 points to .204 in 100 at bats. His slump continued in 1970 as he hit .226 in 124 at bats.

From 1971 to 1973 Brown hit 33 home runs with 110 RBIs in 571 at-bats, including a .338 average in 1971 (66 for 195). He retired on September 30 following the conclusion of the 1975 season.

Brown holds the American League record for the most pinch-hit at bats in a career, with 414. In his career, Brown collected 107 pinch hits including 16 pinch homers - both are also American League career records - and also twice led the AL in pinch hits (1968 and 1974).

In a 13-season career, Brown was a .257 hitter with 84 home runs and 322 runs batted in in 1,051 games played.

== Coaching career ==
After retiring as a player, Brown became a scout and rookie league instructor for the Tigers. He returned to majors in 1978 as the Tigers' hitting coach. He continued in that position through the 1984 season.

== Family and later life ==
Brown moved to Detroit in 1960. He married Detroiter Norma Jean Sterling in July 1962.

In 2009, Crestline High School renamed its baseball field as Gates Brown Field and established a scholarship fund in Brown's honor. At the time, Brown said: "You dream about something like this, but you don't ever think it's going to happen. I didn't want no fanfare when I was with the Tigers, but this is quite an honor."

Brown died of a heart attack on September 27, 2013, at a nursing home, aged 74. He had been in failing health for the last years of his life.

== See also ==
- List of Major League Baseball players with a home run in their first major league at bat
- List of Major League Baseball players who spent their entire career with one franchise
