= Adjusted ERA+ =

Baseball statistic

Adjusted ERA+, often simply abbreviated to ERA+ or ERA plus, is a pitching statistic in baseball. It adjusts a pitcher's earned run average (ERA) according to the pitcher's ballpark (in case the ballpark favors batters or pitchers) and the ERA of the pitcher's league.

== Formula ==
ERA+ is calculated as:

$\mathit{ERA+} = 100 \cdot {{\mathit{lgERA} \over \mathit{ERA}}} \cdot \mathit{PF}$

Where ERA is the pitcher's ERA, lgERA is the average ERA of the league, and PF is the park factor of the pitcher in question.

This formula is now standard, although Baseball-Reference.com briefly used a different formula which took values strictly between 0 and 200 instead of between 0 and infinity, but the current website shows values above 200 so it is clearly no longer in use:

$\mathit{ERA+} = 100 \cdot (2 - {{\mathit{ERA} \over \mathit{lgERA}}} \cdot {{1 \over \mathit{PF}}})$

The average ERA+ is set to be 100; a score above 100 indicates that the pitcher performed better than average, while below 100 indicates worse than average. For instance, imagine the average ERA in the league is 4.00: if pitcher A has an ERA of 4.00 but is pitching in a ballpark that favors hitters, his ERA+ will be over 100. Likewise, if pitcher B has an ERA of 4.00 but pitches in a ballpark favoring pitchers, then his ERA+ will be below 100.

As a result, ERA+ can be used to compare pitchers across different run environments. In the above example, while ERA will lead one to believe that both pitchers pitched at the same level due to their ERAs being equivalent, ERA+ indicates that pitcher A performed better than pitcher B. ERA+ can thus be used to neutralize the effects of some well-known advantages and disadvantages on pitchers' ERA scores.

== Leaders ==
Pedro Martínez holds the modern record for highest ERA+ in a single season; he posted a 1.74 ERA in the 2000 season while pitching in the American League, which had an average ERA of 4.92, which gave Martínez an ERA+ of 291. While Bob Gibson has the lowest ERA in modern times (1.12 in the National League in 1968), the average ERA was 2.99 that year (the so-called Year of the Pitcher) and so Gibson's ERA+ is 258, eighth highest since 1900. 1968 was the last year that Major League Baseball employed the use of a pitcher's mound at 15 inches (380 mm); after that season it was lowered to 10 inches (250 mm).

The career record for ERA+ (with a minimum of 1,000 innings pitched) is held by Mariano Rivera, a closer whose career ERA+ is 205. Upon retirement in 2013, with an ERA+ of 194 in his final season, Rivera's career record of 205 surpassed the record among retired players of 154, held by Martínez, bumping Jim Devlin, a pitcher in the 1870s, to third with 151. Among qualifying pitchers, Pedro Martínez has the most separate seasons with an ERA+ over 200, with five, and the most consecutive 200 ERA+ seasons (4), though the closer Rivera, with too few innings each year to qualify officially, has surpassed 200 ERA+ in 13 seasons of his 19 seasons, including 4 consecutive seasons twice and 5 consecutive seasons once and also surpassing 300 in 2004 and again in 2008. Roger Clemens topped a 200 ERA+ three times, and Greg Maddux had two such seasons.

Players in bold are active as of the end of the 2020 season and have not announced their retirement.

Single-season leaders include only pitchers eligible for the ERA title (a pitcher must throw a minimum of one inning per game scheduled for his team during the season to qualify for the ERA title). Only pitchers with 1,000 or more innings pitched are shown in the career leader list.

Career leaders
Rank	Player	Adjusted ERA+
1	Mariano Rivera	205
2	**Clayton Kershaw**	157
3	**Jacob deGrom**	155
4	Pedro Martínez	154
5	Jim Devlin	150
6	Lefty Grove	148
T-7	Walter Johnson	147
T-7	Hoyt Wilhelm	147
T-9	Dan Quisenberry	146
T-9	Ed Walsh	146
T-9	Smoky Joe Wood	146
T-12	Roger Clemens	143
T-12	Addie Joss	143
14	Brandon Webb	142
15	Trevor Hoffman	141
16	**Chris Sale**	140
17	Kid Nichols	139
T-18	Mordecai Brown	138
T-18	John Franco	138
T-18	Cy Young	138
T-21	Christy Mathewson	136
T-21	Johan Santana	136
T-21	Bruce Sutter	136
T-24	Pete Alexander	135
T-24	Randy Johnson	135
T-24	**Corey Kluber**	135
T-24	Rube Waddell	135

Single-season leaders
Rank	Player	Adjusted ERA+	Year	Team
1	Tim Keefe	293	1880	Troy Trojans
2	Pedro Martínez	291	2000	Boston Red Sox
3	**Shane Bieber**	281	2020	Cleveland Indians
4	Dutch Leonard	279	1914	Boston Red Sox
5	**Trevor Bauer**	276	2020	Cincinnati Reds
6	Greg Maddux	271	1994	Atlanta Braves
7	Greg Maddux	260	1995	Atlanta Braves
8	Walter Johnson	259	1913	Washington Senators
9	Bob Gibson	258	1968	St. Louis Cardinals
10	Mordecai Brown	253	1906	Chicago Cubs
T-11	Pedro Martínez	243	1999	Boston Red Sox
T-11	Walter Johnson	243	1912	Washington Senators
13	Christy Mathewson	233	1905	New York Giants
14	Dwight Gooden	229	1985	New York Mets
15	Roger Clemens	226	2005	Houston Astros
16	Pete Alexander	225	1915	Philadelphia Phillies
T-17	Christy Mathewson	224	1909	New York Giants
T-17	**Dallas Keuchel**	224	2020	Chicago White Sox
T-19	Roger Clemens	222	1997	Toronto Blue Jays
T-19	**Zack Greinke**	222	2015	Los Angeles Dodgers
