= Ike Blessitt =

American baseball player (born 1949)

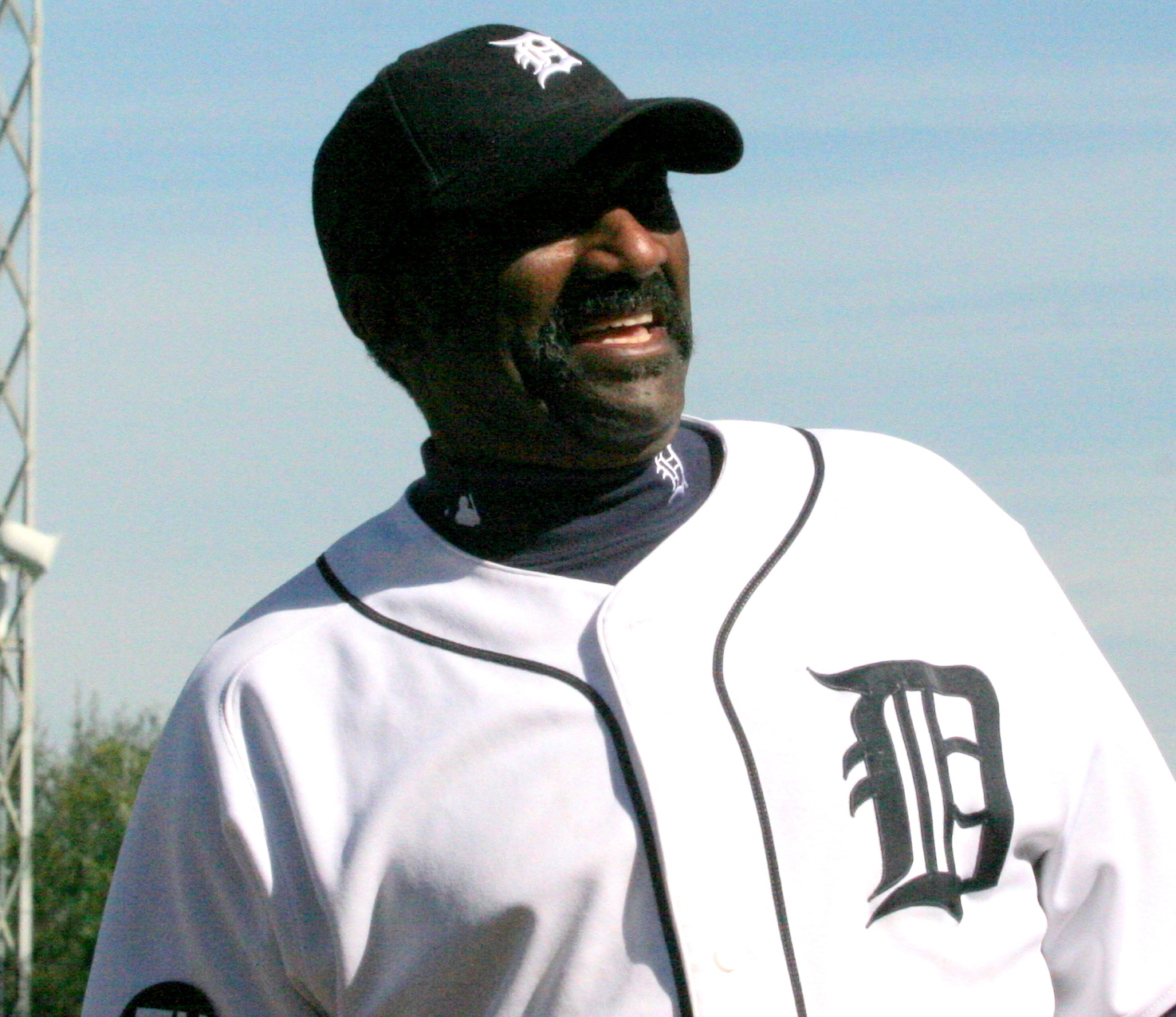
- Blessitt at Detroit Tigers fantasy camp in 2012
- Right field / center field
- Born: September 30, 1949 (age 76); Detroit, Michigan, U.S.
- Batted: Right Threw: Right

MLB debut
- September 7, 1972, for the Detroit Tigers

Last MLB appearance
- October 4, 1972, for the Detroit Tigers

MLB statistics
- Games played: 4
- At bats: 5
- Hits: 0
- Stats at Baseball Reference

Teams
- Detroit Tigers (1972)

Isaiah (Ike) Blessitt (born September 30, 1949) is an American former Major League Baseball (MLB) outfielder who played in 1972 with the Detroit Tigers. He batted and threw right-handed. Blessitt had no hits in five at bats in four games, in his one-year career.

He was drafted by the Tigers in the 15th round of the 1967 amateur draft.
