= 1971 Detroit Tigers season =

Major League Baseball season

1971 Detroit Tigers
- League: American League
- Division: East
- Ballpark: Tiger Stadium
- City: Detroit, Michigan
- Owners: John Fetzer
- General managers: Jim Campbell
- Managers: Billy Martin
- Television: WJBK (George Kell, Larry Osterman)
- Radio: WJR (Ernie Harwell, Ray Lane)

The 1971 Detroit Tigers season was the team's 71st season and the 60th season at Tiger Stadium. The Tigers finished in second place in the American League East with a 91–71 record, 12 games behind the Orioles. They outscored their opponents 701 to 645. They drew 1,591,073 fans to Tiger Stadium, the second highest attendance in the American League.

== Offseason ==
- October 9, 1970: Denny McLain, Elliott Maddox, Norm McRae, and Don Wert were traded by the Tigers to the Washington Senators for Ed Brinkman, Aurelio Rodríguez, Joe Coleman, and Jim Hannan.
- March 30, 1971: Jerry Robertson was traded by the Detroit Tigers to the New York Mets for Dean Chance and Bill Denehy.

== Regular season ==
Mickey Lolich became the second pitcher in the history of the American League to win 25 games but not win the Cy Young Award.

=== Season standings ===
AL East
Team	W	L	Pct.	GB	Home	Road
Baltimore Orioles	101	57	.639	—	53‍–‍24	48‍–‍33
Detroit Tigers	91	71	.562	12	54‍–‍27	37‍–‍44
Boston Red Sox	85	77	.525	18	47‍–‍33	38‍–‍44
New York Yankees	82	80	.506	21	44‍–‍37	38‍–‍43
Washington Senators	63	96	.396	38½	35‍–‍46	28‍–‍50
Cleveland Indians	60	102	.370	43	29‍–‍52	31‍–‍50

=== Record vs. opponents ===
1971 American League record Sources:
Team	BAL	BOS	CAL	CWS	CLE	DET	KC	MIL	MIN	NYY	OAK	WAS
Baltimore	—	9–9	7–5	8–4	13–5	8–10	6–5	9–3	10–2	11–7	7–4	13–3
Boston	9–9	—	6–6	10–2	11–7	12–6	1–11	6–6	8–4	7–11	3–9	12–6
California	5–7	6–6	—	8–10	8–4	6–6	8–10	6–12	12–6	6–6	7–11	4–8
Chicago	4–8	2–10	10–8	—	3–9	7–5	9–9	11–7	7–11	5–7	11–7	10–2
Cleveland	5–13	7–11	4–8	9–3	—	6–12	2–10	4–8	4–8	8–10	4–8	7–11
Detroit	10–8	6–12	6–6	5–7	12–6	—	8–4	10–2	6–6	10–8	4–8	14–4
Kansas City	5–6	11–1	10–8	9–9	10–2	4–8	—	8–10	9–9	5–7	5–13	9–3
Milwaukee	3–9	6–6	12–6	7–11	8–4	2–10	10–8	—	10–7	2–10	3–15	6–6
Minnesota	2–10	4–8	6–12	11–7	8–4	6–6	9–9	7–10	—	8–4	8–10	5–6
New York	7–11	11–7	6–6	7–5	10–8	8–10	7–5	10–2	4–8	—	5–7	7–11
Oakland	4–7	9–3	11–7	7–11	8–4	8–4	13–5	15–3	10–8	7–5	—	9–3
Washington	3–13	6–12	8–4	2–10	11–7	4–14	3–9	6–6	6–5	11–7	3–9	—

=== Notable transactions ===
- April 9, 1971: Dave Boswell was signed as a free agent by the Tigers.
- May 28, 1971: Dave Boswell was released by the Tigers.
- June 8, 1971: Gene Pentz was drafted by the Tigers in the 7th round of the 1971 Major League Baseball draft.
- June 12, 1971: Carl Cavanaugh (minors) and Mike Fremuth (minors) were traded by the Tigers to the Philadelphia Phillies for Tony Taylor.

=== Roster ===
1971 Detroit Tigers
Roster
Pitchers: 32 Dave Boswell; 38 Les Cain; 14,32 Dean Chance; 15 Joe Coleman; 27 Bill Denehy; 45 Jim Foor; 36 Bill Gilbreth; 16 Jim Hannan; 35 Mike Kilkenny; 29 Mickey Lolich; 19 Joe Niekro; 43 Daryl Patterson; 16 Ron Perranoski; 39 Fred Scherman; 37 Chuck Seelbach; 28 Tom Timmermann; 43 Jack Whillock; 21 Bill Zepp	Catchers: 11 Bill Freehan; 34 Tim Hosley; 33 Gene Lamont; 12 Jim Price; Infielders: 8 Ed Brinkman; 9 Ike Brown; 25 Norm Cash; 44 Kevin Collins; 7 César Gutiérrez; 3 Dick McAuliffe; 4 Aurelio Rodríguez; 10 Tony Taylor; 41 John Young	Outfielders: 26 Gates Brown; 23 Willie Horton; 2 Dalton Jones; 6 Al Kaline; 46 Marvin Lane; 5 Jim Northrup; 24 Mickey Stanley	Manager: 1 Billy Martin; Coaches: 50 Art Fowler (Pitching); 51 Joe Schultz (Third base); 52 Charlie Silvera (Bullpen); 53 Frank Skaff (First base)

== Player stats ==
=== Batting ===
= Indicates team leader

==== Starters by position ====
Note: G = Games played; AB = At bats; H = Hits; Avg. = Batting average; HR = Home runs; RBI = Runs batted in

Pos	Player	G	AB	H	Avg.	HR	RBI
C	Bill Freehan	148	516	143	.277	21	71
1B	Norm Cash	135	452	128	.283	32	91
2B	Dick McAuliffe	128	477	99	.208	18	57
3B	Aurelio Rodríguez	154	604	153	.253	15	39
SS	Ed Brinkman	159	527	120	.228	1	37
LF	Willie Horton	119	450	130	.289	22	72
CF	Mickey Stanley	139	401	117	.292	7	55
RF	Al Kaline	133	405	119	.294	15	54

==== Other batters ====
Note: G = Games played; AB = At bats; H = Hits; Avg. = Batting average; HR = Home runs; RBI = Runs batted in

Player	G	AB	H	Avg.	HR	RBI
Jim Northrup	136	459	124	.270	16	71
Gates Brown	82	195	66	.338	11	29
Tony Taylor	55	181	52	.287	3	19
Dalton Jones	83	138	35	.254	5	11
Ike Brown	59	110	28	.255	8	19
Jim Price	29	54	13	.241	1	7
Kevin Collins	31	41	11	.268	1	4
César Gutiérrez	38	37	7	.189	0	4
Tim Hosley	7	16	3	.188	2	6
Gene Lamont	7	15	1	.067	0	1
Marvin Lane	8	14	2	.143	0	1
John Young	2	4	2	.500	0	1

Note: pitchers' batting statistics not included

=== Pitching ===
= Indicates league leader

==== Starting pitchers ====
Note: G = Games; IP = Innings pitched; W = Wins; L = Losses; ERA = Earned run average; SO = Strikeouts

Player	G	IP	W	L	ERA	SO
Mickey Lolich	45	376.0	25	14	2.92	308
Joe Coleman	39	286.0	20	9	3.15	236
Les Cain	26	144.2	10	9	4.35	118

==== Other pitchers ====
Note: G = Games pitched; IP = Innings pitched; W = Wins; L = Losses; ERA = Earned run average; SO = Strikeouts

Player	G	IP	W	L	ERA	SO
Joe Niekro	31	122.1	6	7	4.49	43
Dean Chance	31	89.2	4	6	3.51	64
Mike Kilkenny	30	86.1	4	5	5.00	47
Bill Zepp	16	31.2	1	1	5.12	15
Bill Gilbreth	9	30.0	2	1	4.80	14

==== Relief pitchers ====
Note: G = Games pitched; W = Wins; L= Losses; SV = Saves; GF = Games finished; ERA = Earned run average; SO = Strikeouts

Player	G	W	L	SV	GF	ERA	SO
Fred Scherman	69	11	6	20	40	2.71	76
Tom Timmermann	52	7	6	4	23	3.86	51
Bill Denehy	31	0	3	1	10	4.22	27
Daryl Patterson	12	0	1	0	3	4.82	5
Ron Perranoski	11	0	1	2	7	2.50	8
Jim Hannan	7	1	0	0	3	3.27	6
Jack Whillock	7	0	2	1	2	5.63	6
Chuck Seelbach	5	0	0	0	0	13.50	1
Dave Boswell	3	0	0	0	1	6.23	3
Jim Foor	3	0	0	0	1	18.00	2

== Awards and honors ==
- Mickey Lolich, Tiger of the Year award from Detroit baseball writers

=== All-Star Selections ===
All-Star Game

- Norm Cash, First Base, Reserve
- Bill Freehand, Catcher, Reserve
- Al Kaline, Outfield, Reserve
- Mickey Lolich, Pitcher, Reserve

=== League top ten finishers ===
Ed Brinkman

- AL leader in games played at shortstop (159)
- AL leader in innings played at shortstop (1395-2/3)
- AL leader in assists by a shortstop (513)
- #4 in AL in games played (159)
- #7 in AL in times hit by pitch (7)

Norm Cash

- Finished 12th in AL MVP voting
- AL leader in at bats per home run (14.1)
- #2 in AL in home runs (32)
- #3 in AL in slugging percentage (.531)
- #3 in AL in OPS (.903)
- #7 in AL in times hit by pitch (7)
- #8 in AL in RBIs (91)
- #9 in AL in runs created (93)
- 7th oldest player in the AL

Joe Coleman

- #3 in AL in strikeouts (236)
- #4 in AL in strikeouts per 9 innings pitched (7.43)
- #5 in AL in win percentage (.690)
- #5 in AL in innings pitched (286)
- #5 in AL in batters faced (1174)
- #6 in AL in wins (20)
- #9 in AL in complete games (16)

Bill Freehan

- AL leader in games at catcher (144)
- AL leader in complete games at catcher (128)
- AL leader in innings played at catcher (1265)
- AL leader in putouts by a catcher (912)
- #3 in AL in times hit by pitch (9)
- #8 in AL in doubles (26)
- #9 in AL in extra base hits (51)
- #9 in AL in at bats per strikeout (10.8)

Willie Horton

- #7 in AL in slugging percentage (.496)
- #7 in AL in times hit by pitch (7)
- #10 in AL in extra base hits (48)
- #10 in AL in at bats per home run (20.5)

Al Kaline

- #3 in AL in on-base percentage (.416)
- #6 in AL in OPS (.878)
- #7 in AL in time hit by pitch (7)
- #8 in AL in batting average (.294)
- #10 in AL in bases on balls (82)
- 9th oldest player in the AL

Mickey Lolich

- Finished 2nd in AL Cy Young Award voting (behind Vida Blue)
- Finished 5th in AL MVP voting
- MLB leader in wins (25)
- MLB leader in strikeouts (308)
- MLB leader in innings pitched (376)
- MLB leader in games started (45)
- AL leader in complete games (29)
- MLB leader in hits allowed (336)
- MLB leader in batters faced (1538)
- #2 in MLB in home runs allowed (36)
- #2 in MLB in earned runs allowed (122)
- #4 in AL in sacrifice hits (16)
- #4 in AL in strikeout to walk ratio (3.35)
- #5 in AL in strikeouts per 9 innings pitched (7.37)
- #7 in AL in Adjusted ERA+ (125)
- #8 in AL in bases on balls per 9 innings pitched (2.20)
- #10 in AL in ERA (2.92)

Aurelio Rodríguez

- #3 in AL in doubles (30)
- #4 in AL in triples (7)
- #4 in AL in outs (476)
- #5 in AL in at bats (604)
- #8 in AL in extra base hits (52)
- #10 in AL in strikeouts (104)

Fred Scherman

- #2 in AL in games by pitcher (69)
- #3 in AL in saves (20)
- #3 in AL in games finished (40)

=== Players ranking among top 100 all time at position ===
The following members of the 1972 Tigers were ranked among the Top 100 of all time at their position in The New Bill James Historical Baseball Abstract in 2001:

- Bill Freehan: 12th best catcher of all time
- Norm Cash: 20th best first baseman of all time
- Dick McAuliffe: 22nd best second baseman of all time
- Aurelio Rodríguez: 91st best third baseman of all time
- Willie Horton: 55th best left fielder of all time
- Al Kaline: 11th best right fielder of all time
- Mickey Lolich: 72nd best pitcher of all time

== Farm system ==
Level	Team	League	Manager
AAA	Toledo Mud Hens	International League	Mike Roarke
AA	Montgomery Rebels	Southern League	Dick Tracewski
A	Rocky Mount Leafs	Carolina League	Len Okrie
A	Lakeland Tigers	Florida State League	Stubby Overmire
A	Clinton Pilots	Midwest League	Max Lanier
A-Short Season	Batavia Trojans	New York–Penn League	Joe Lewis
Rookie	Bristol Tigers	Appalachian League	Jim Leyland
