= Bill Zepp =

American baseball player (born 1946)

- Pitcher
- Born: July 22, 1946 (age 79); Detroit, Michigan, U.S.
- Batted: Right Threw: Right

MLB debut
- August 12, 1969, for the Minnesota Twins

Last MLB appearance
- June 20, 1971, for the Detroit Tigers

MLB statistics
- Win–loss record: 10–5
- Earned run average: 3.64
- Strikeouts: 81
- Stats at Baseball Reference

Teams
- Minnesota Twins (1969–1970); Detroit Tigers (1971)

William Clinton Zepp (born July 22, 1946) is an American former professional baseball player. A right-handed pitcher, he attended the University of Michigan and later played professional baseball for four years from 1968 to 1971, including stints in Major League Baseball with the Minnesota Twins (1969–1970) and Detroit Tigers (1971). He compiled a 10-5 win–loss record (.667 winning percentage) and a 3.64 earned run average (ERA) in 63 major league games. He was listed as 6 feet 2 inches (1.88 m) tall and 185 pounds (84 kg).

== Early years ==
Zepp was born in Detroit, Michigan, and became a "superstar" while attending Redford High School in that city. After graduating from high school, Zepp declined the opportunity to play professional baseball and instead enrolled at the University of Michigan. While attending Michigan, Zepp reportedly "lost his velocity and confidence" as a pitcher. He was drafted but did not sign on three occasions while attending school: by the Milwaukee Braves in the 33rd round of the 1965 Major League Baseball draft; by the Detroit Tigers in the eighth round of the 1966 MLB Draft; and by the Boston Red Sox in the seventh round of the 1967 MLB Draft.

== Professional baseball ==
Zepp graduated from the University of Michigan in the spring of 1968 with a master's degree in marketing. After receiving his degree, Zepp sought to pursue his dream of playing Major League Baseball, but most clubs were not interested in a 22-year-old rookie. Zepp noted, "I finally went begging for a chance to play. When I decided I was in good enough shape, I went to some of the old scouts who had seen me play. I felt I wouldn't embarrass any team that signed me and this was important. Minnesota Twins' scout Frank Franchi convinced the club to give Zepp a chance, and he was signed by the Twins as an amateur free agent.

After signing with the Twins, Zepp was assigned for the remainder of the 1968 season to the Wisconsin Rapids Twins where he compiled a 4-6 record and a 3.00 earned run average (ERA) in 14 games. During the winter following the 1968 season, Zepp played in the Florida Instructional League where he worked on developing a changeup pitch and led the circuit with a 1.14 ERA.

After a strong showing in spring training in 1969, Twins manager Billy Martin told Zepp he would start the season with the Twins' Triple A club in Denver. However, in a move that reportedly infuriated Martin, the club's management instead assigned Zepp to play Single-A ball with the Red Springs Twins in the Carolina League. Zepp was quickly promoted to play Double-A ball with the Charlotte Hornets in the Southern League. Between the two minor league clubs, Zepp compiled an 18-4 record in the minor leagues during the 1969 season.

In August 1969, Zepp was called up by the Twins and made his major league debut on August 12, 1969. In four games for the Twins at the waning months of the 1969 season, he compiled a 6.75 ERA in 5-1/3 innings pitched. In 1970, Zepp appeared in 43 games, including 20 games as a starter, compiling a 9–4 record and a 3.22 ERA. He also ranked third in the American League having hit batsmen nine times in 1970. Zepp made two short relief appearances in the 1970 American League Championship Series against the Baltimore Orioles, giving up two hits and one run in one inning.

Prior to the 1971 season, Zepp refused to sign a contract extension with the Twins and stated that he intended to retire from baseball unless he were traded to the Detroit Tigers, his hometown club. In March 1971, following an injury to Tigers' starter Joe Coleman, Zepp was traded by the Twins to the Tigers in exchange for Mike Adams and a player to be named later (minor league pitcher Art Clifford). At the time of the trade, Detroit manager Billy Martin said, "Coming here where he wants to play might make him a better pitcher. I don't know but I hope so." Zepp appeared in 16 games for the 1971 Tigers. He won his first game for Detroit on May 22, 1971, a 3-1 victory over the Baltimore Orioles. However, Zepp's ERA rose to 5.12 while playing for Detroit, and he appeared in his last major league game on June 20, 1971. Zepp later recalled that he had suffered a "Tommy John injury", tearing a tendon and resulting in lost arm strength. Zepp decided not to undergo risky surgery and instead retired from baseball.

Zepp concluded his professional baseball career in 1971 playing for the Toledo Mud Hens in the International League.
