= Middletown Woodrow Wilson High School =

- Woodrow Wilson High School
- U.S. National Register of Historic Places
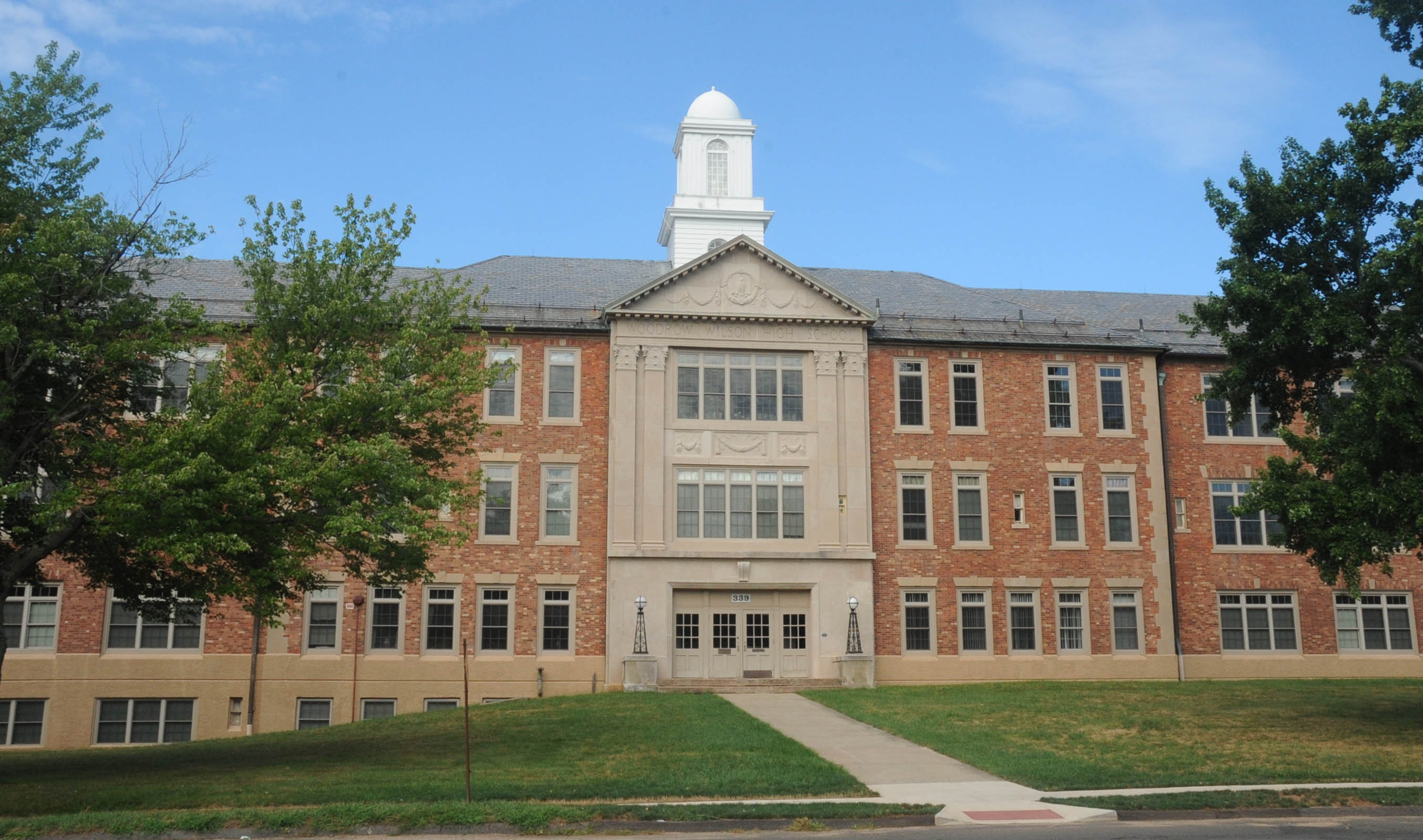
- in 2016

- Location within Connecticut Location within the United States
- Location: Hunting Hill Avenue and Russell Street, Middletown, Connecticut
- Coordinates: 41°32′27″N 72°38′52″W
- Area: 16 acres (6.5 ha)
- Built: 1931
- Architect: Towner & Sellew Assoc.; Baldwin, Linus
- Architectural style: Colonial Revival, Classical Revival, Georgian Revival
- NRHP reference No.: 86002270
- Added to NRHP: August 06, 1986

The Middletown Woodrow Wilson High School is a former high school, now used as residential apartments, located at 339 Hunting Hill Avenue, Middletown, Connecticut. Built in 1931, it was the city's first unified high school, a role it served until 1958. It then served as a junior high school before being adapted to its present residential use. The building was listed on the National Register of Historic Places in 1986.

== Description and history ==
The Middletown Woodrow Wilson High School is located in what is now a predominantly residential area south of downtown Middletown, on the west side of Hunting Hill Avenue south of its junction with Russell Street. It is a three-story structure, built of brick with concrete trim, and covered by a hip roof topped by a small tower and cupola. Its main entrance is in a prominent Classical Revival portico, with paired pilasters flanking the second and third-floor windows, garlanded panels between those floors, and a fully pedimented gable with modillion blocks and a round panel at the center.

The school was built in 1931, on what was then a more rural agricultural area. It was designed by Linus Baldwin, of Towner & Sellew Associates, to meet the growing demand for education in the city's more rural outlying areas. At first considered for use as a junior high school, and had what were then state-of-the-art facilities, including specialized classrooms, laboratory and vocational shop areas, and art and music rooms. It served as the city's high school until 1958, and then as a junior high school, before it was rehabilitated for residential use.

== Notable alumni ==
- Bill Denehy (baseball), former Major League Baseball pitcher

== See also ==
- National Register of Historic Places listings in Middletown, Connecticut
