= Bill Denehy (baseball) =

American baseball player (1946–2025)

- Pitcher
- Born: March 31, 1946; Middletown, Connecticut, U.S.
- Died: June 27, 2025 (aged 79); Orlando, Florida, U.S.
- Batted: Switch Threw: Right

MLB debut
- April 16, 1967, for the New York Mets

Last MLB appearance
- September 19, 1971, for the Detroit Tigers

MLB statistics
- Win–loss record: 1–10
- Earned run average: 4.56
- Strikeouts: 63
- Stats at Baseball Reference

Teams
- New York Mets (1967); Washington Senators (1968); Detroit Tigers (1971)

William Francis Denehy (March 31, 1946 – June 27, 2025) was an American professional baseball pitcher and coach. Denehy threw and batted right-handed, stood 6 ft 3 in (1.91 m) tall, and weighed 200 lb (91 kg). He was born in Middletown, Connecticut and attended Middletown Woodrow Wilson High School.

The second-ever Middletown Little League alumnus to play Major League Baseball, he signed with the New York Mets out of high school for a $20,000 bonus and made his professional debut with the Auburn Mets of the New York–Penn League (then Class A) in 1965. He led the league in wins with 13, and the following season won nine of 11 decisions with the Double-A Williamsport Mets of the Eastern League, compiling a stellar 1.97 earned run average. In 1967, Denehy made 15 Major League appearances for the Mets, dropping seven of eight decisions with an ERA of 4.67. The 1967 Mets finished in tenth and last place, the fifth cellar-dwelling team in the expansion club's six-year history.

== Traded for manager Gil Hodges ==
On November 27, 1967, the Mets traded Denehy to the Washington Senators for the Senators' manager, Gil Hodges, who was then in the middle of a multi-year contract he had signed as Washington's skipper. The Mets' managerial post was open after the late-season departure of Wes Westrum, and team officials began negotiations with the Senators to release Hodges from his contract, which still had a year to run.

Hodges was a New York baseball legend as the power-hitting and Gold Glove-fielding first baseman for the Brooklyn Dodgers of the 1950s. He had become a year-round resident of Brooklyn, and in the twilight of his playing career was an original Met, starting at first base in their maiden NL game in 1962. On May 23, 1963, the Mets had traded Hodges to Washington for centerfielder Jimmy Piersall, and Hodges immediately retired as an active player to become the Senators' manager. Although the expansion-era Senators had themselves never posted a winning record since their 1961 inception, the team had shown steady season-to-season improvement since Hodges' appointment as manager. During the three-week-long winter interleague trading period then in effect, the Mets agreed to send Denehy and $100,000 as compensation for Washington's release of Hodges from his contract.

== Career with Senators, Tigers ==
While Hodges brought home an improved, but still ninth-place, Mets' team in 1968, Denehy pitched in only three innings for the 1968 Senators and spent most of the season in the minor leagues. The following season, Denehy remained in Triple-A and was traded in June to the Cleveland Indians' organization. Meanwhile, in his second year as the Mets' manager, Hodges led the "1969 Miracle Mets" to the team's first National League and World Series championships.

Denehy returned to the Majors with the 1971 Detroit Tigers, appearing in 31 games, all but one of them in relief, compiling an 0–3 mark with an ERA of 4.22 in 49 innings.

All told, Denehy appeared in 49 Major League games, winning one and losing ten (.091) with an ERA of 4.56 in 104 2/3 innings pitched. He retired after the 1973 season.

== Coaching career ==
For two seasons (1981–1982), Denehy served as the pitching coach for the Double-A Bristol Red Sox. In the 1983 season, he served a third season as pitching coach in the Red Sox minor league system, this time with the Red Sox new affiliate, the New Britain Red Sox (now the Hartford Yard Goats).

From the start of the 1985 season until the middle of the 1987 season, Denehy was the head college baseball coach of the Hartford Hawks. Following an April 1987 game against UConn in which two bench-clearing brawls broke out, Denehy was fired for making inflammatory remarks made about Connecticut's team and Connecticut assistant coach Mitch Pietras. Under Denehy, the Hawks had a 17–79 record.

== Retirement and death ==
Denehy also worked in real estate, television and radio and taught golf.

Denehy began losing his eyesight in 2005 and, as of 2018, was legally blind with no vision in his right eye and glaucoma and macular holes in his left. He had received multiple grants from the Baseball Assistance Team to assist in paying for eye surgeries as he was ineligible for a pension from Major League Baseball under pre-1980 rules. Denehy died on June 27, 2025, at the age of 79.
