= Norm McRae =

American baseball player (1947–2003)

- Pitcher
- Born: September 26, 1947; Elizabeth, New Jersey, U.S.
- Died: July 25, 2003 (aged 55); Garland, Texas, U.S.
- Batted: Right Threw: Right

MLB debut
- September 13, 1969, for the Detroit Tigers

Last MLB appearance
- September 24, 1970, for the Detroit Tigers

MLB statistics
- Win–loss record: 0–0
- Earned run average: 3.15
- Strikeouts: 19
- Stats at Baseball Reference

Teams
- Detroit Tigers (1969–1970)

Norman McRae (September 26, 1947 – July 25, 2003) was an American professional baseball player, a right-handed pitcher who appeared in 22 Major League games for the 1969–1970 Detroit Tigers. Born in Elizabeth, New Jersey, he stood 6 feet 1 inch (1.85 m) tall and weighed 195 pounds (88 kg).

McRae attended Elizabeth High School and signed with the Tigers in 1966 as an undrafted free agent. He moved through the Tiger farm system and after his fourth minor league campaign he was given a three-game, late-season trial in 1969. The following year, he had mid- and late-season auditions with Detroit as a relief pitcher, working in 19 games. Although he failed to record a decision or a save, McRae had some success, allowing 26 hits in 31 1/3 innings pitched and fashioning a 2.87 earned run average — although he issued more bases on balls (25) than he had strikeouts (16).

He then was included in a controversial off-season trade. On October 9, 1970, the 23-year-old McRae was sent to the Washington Senators with former Cy Young Award winning pitcher Denny McLain, outfielder Elliott Maddox and third baseman Don Wert for pitchers Joe Coleman and Jim Hannan, shortstop Ed Brinkman and third baseman Aurelio Rodríguez.

The trade was a boon for the Tigers, and a catastrophe for the Senators. McLain, just two years removed from winning 31 games for the world champion 1968 Tigers (and one year after notching 24 victories for Detroit's 1969 club), had been suspended for much of the 1970 season by Commissioner of Baseball Bowie Kuhn on gambling allegations and had won only three of eight decisions. His career was all but over at the age of 26; in 1971, he lost 22 games, the Senators lost 96 games and drew the fewest fans in baseball. Washington owner Bob Short, who was his own general manager and made the trade, would spend much of the season petitioning the American League, successfully, to move the franchise to Dallas-Fort Worth. Meanwhile, Coleman would twice win 20 games for the Tigers and pitch for them through 1976, while Brinkman and Rodríguez would anchor the left side of the Tiger infield for several seasons, including 1972 when Detroit won the American League East Division title.

McRae, for his part, made no contribution to the Senators and never appeared in an official game for them. He spent the remainder of his career in the minor leagues. He was traded with Jim Foor from the Tigers to the Pirates for Dick Sharon at the Winter Meetings on November 27, 1972. In his 22 MLB games, all with the Tigers, he allowed 28 hits and 12 earned runs in 34 1/3 innings pitched, with 26 bases on balls and 19 strikeouts.

== See also ==
- Bob Short
