= Jim Hannan =

American baseball player (1940–2024)

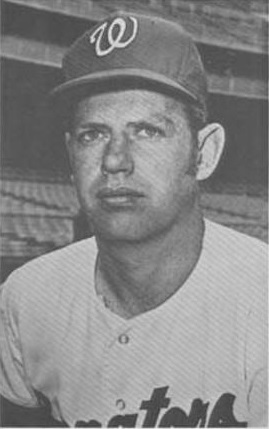
- Hannan in 1969
- Pitcher
- Born: January 7, 1940; Jersey City, New Jersey, U.S.
- Died: February 9, 2024 (aged 84); Annandale, Virginia, U.S.
- Batted: Right Threw: Right

MLB debut
- April 17, 1962, for the Washington Senators

Last MLB appearance
- September 10, 1971, for the Milwaukee Brewers

MLB statistics
- Win–loss record: 41–48
- Earned run average: 3.88
- Strikeouts: 438
- Stats at Baseball Reference

Teams
- Washington Senators (1962–1970); Detroit Tigers (1971); Milwaukee Brewers (1971)

James John Hannan (January 7, 1940 – February 9, 2024) was an American professional baseball player who pitched in Major League Baseball (MLB) from 1962 to 1971 for the Washington Senators, Detroit Tigers, and Milwaukee Brewers. Hannan co-founded the MLB Players Alumni Association and served as its first president.

== Early life ==
Jim Hannan was born in Jersey City, New Jersey, on January 7, 1940. (Some sources report 1939 as the year of birth.) He began his baseball career at St. Peter's Preparatory School in Jersey City, which inducted him in 2005 into the first class of its athletic hall of fame. He attended the University of Notre Dame and played college baseball for the Notre Dame Fighting Irish. Hannan earned a Bachelor of Arts in economics from Notre Dame.

== Career ==
Hannan signed with the Boston Red Sox in August 1960, and reported to the Red Sox before 1961 minor league season. After posting a 17–7 win–loss record and leading the Class D New York–Penn League in strikeouts, he was selected by Washington in the first-year player draft. His MLB service, which lasted all or part of ten years, began the following season. In 1968, Hannan had career-bests with 10 wins, a 3.01 earned run average (ERA), and 75 strikeouts.

After the 1970 campaign, the Senators traded Hannan, fellow right-hander Joe Coleman, shortstop Ed Brinkman, and third baseman Aurelio Rodríguez to the Detroit Tigers for former 30-game-winner Denny McLain, Don Wert, Elliott Maddox, and Norm McRae. Hannan only got into seven games for the 1971 Tigers and was effective in middle relief, before being traded to the Milwaukee Brewers on May 11 for John Gelnar and José Herrera. He finished his career as a relief pitcher for Milwaukee and was released after the season. Hannan tried out with the Atlanta Braves in 1972, but was assigned to the Richmond Braves and opted to retire rather than return to the minor leagues.

During his MLB career, Hannan appeared in 276 games, with 101 starting assignments. He compiled a 41–48 record, with a career ERA of 3.88, allowing 807 hits and 408 bases on balls in 822 innings pitched. He struck out 438, and posted nine complete games, four shutouts, and seven saves.

== Later life ==
Hannan earned a master's degree in finance and investments from New York University in 1965. His mentor was Lawrence Ritter. Hannan wrote his master's thesis on MLB's pension, noting how almost 70 percent of MLB players did not achieve the required five years of major league service time required to qualify for the plan. Marvin Miller used Hannan's thesis to familiarize himself with MLB's pension plan before entering into labor negotiations with MLB.

In 1982, Hannan co-founded the Major League Baseball Players Alumni Association (MLBPAA). He served as its first president, from 1982 until 1986. Hannan was chair of the board of directors for the MLBPAA from 1996 until 2024.

The MLBPAA announced on February 9, 2024, that Hannan had died.
