= Elliott Maddox =

American baseball player (born 1947)

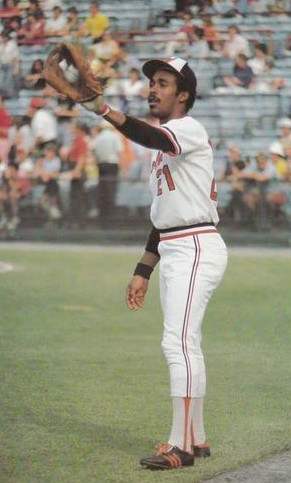
- Maddox in 1977
- Outfielder / Third baseman
- Born: December 21, 1947 (age 78); East Orange, New Jersey, U.S.
- Batted: Right Threw: Right

MLB debut
- April 7, 1970, for the Detroit Tigers

Last MLB appearance
- October 1, 1980, for the New York Mets

MLB statistics
- Batting average: .261
- Home Runs: 18
- Runs batted in: 234
- Stats at Baseball Reference

Teams
- Detroit Tigers (1970); Washington Senators / Texas Rangers (1971–1973); New York Yankees (1974–1976); Baltimore Orioles (1977); New York Mets (1978–1980)

Elliott Maddox (born December 21, 1947) is an American former Major League Baseball player. In 1968, he was drafted by the Detroit Tigers in the first round (20th pick) of the draft (secondary phase). He made his MLB debut in 1970.

== Early years ==
Maddox was born in East Orange, New Jersey and grew up in Vauxhall, New Jersey. He graduated from Union High School in Union County, New Jersey. As a senior, he was selected by the Houston Astros in the fourth round of the 1966 Major League Baseball draft, but chose to attend the University of Michigan, instead. As a sophomore in 1968, he won the Big Ten batting title with a .467 batting average. In June 1968, he was drafted by the Detroit Tigers in the first round (20th pick) of the draft (secondary phase). He converted to Judaism in the 1970s. Maddox studied under a Conservative rabbi for his conversion, but later identified as a Reform Jew. He was married under a chuppah and his son had a bris.

== Detroit Tigers ==
Maddox spent just two seasons in the Tigers' farm system, never playing higher than high A ball, before making his major league debut as a 22 year old in 1970. An exceptional all around fielder, Maddox split his minor league career between the outfield and third base. Likewise, when he joined the Tigers, he served as both a fourth outfielder and third baseman Don Wert's backup. He batted .248 with three home runs and 24 runs batted in his only season in Detroit to earn "Tigers Rookie of the Year" honors from the Detroit Sports Broadcasters' Association. The day after Commissioner of Baseball Bowie Kuhn lifted former Cy Young Award winner Denny McLain's indefinite suspension from Major League Baseball, Maddox was packaged with McLain, Wert and pitcher Norm McRae, and shipped to the Washington Senators for pitchers Joe Coleman and Jim Hannan, and infielders Ed Brinkman and Aurelio Rodríguez.

== Washington Senators ==
Maddox struggled with a sub-.200 batting average for much of a turbulent 1971 campaign. Along with infielder Bernie Allen and pitcher Denny McLain, he was among the disgruntled teammates who openly conspired to get Manager Ted Williams fired during the season. Williams referred to the group as The Underminders Club, but their efforts proved to be unsuccessful and he remained with the team for one more season.

Maddox owned a .171 batting average, one home run and 12 RBIs at the All-Star break, but he managed to bring his average up to .217 with a hot August (.357 avg.) and September (.273 avg.). While he began the season in a similar utility player role to that which he had in Detroit, he showed improvement toward the end of the season, when Willams began to use him in a lefty-righty platoon with Del Unser in center field, where he led all American League outfielders in range factor per 9 innings (3.05). On September 30, the last day of the season, Maddox drove in the final run in franchise history.

== Texas Rangers ==
Owner Bob Short moved the Senators to Arlington, Texas for the 1972 season, where they became the Texas Rangers. In his new location, Maddox once again found himself in a platoon in center. This time, with former first round pick, Joe Lovitto. Williams took advantage of Maddox's speed, using him in the lead-off spot far more than he had the previous season. For the season, he scored forty runs and stole a career high twenty bases. Under managers Whitey Herzog and Billy Martin, Maddox's playing time dipped substantially in 1973. Especially Martin, with whom Maddox had a strained relationship. (Maddox had learned after his trade from the Detroit Tigers that Martin, who was managing the Tigers, had nicknamed Maddox as "Downtown Nigger.") During Spring training 1974, the New York Yankees purchased him from the Rangers.

== New York Yankees ==
Maddox's Yankees career began slowly, as he batted just .174 in April. In May, Maddox batted .371. Add to that the eight walks he drew, he had a .488 on-base percentage for the month, prompting manager Bill Virdon to move Maddox into the lead-off spot. He also started the season playing right field, however, soon switched positions with All-Star center fielder Bobby Murcer. For the season, he finishing sixth in the AL with a .303 average with a career high 75 runs scored in a career high 550 plate appearances. He also logged career highs in at bats (466), RBIs (45), doubles (26), on-base percentage (.395), walks (69) and OPS (.781). He had fourteen assists from the center field (18 total) and four double plays, leading all AL center fielders in both categories.

In a Spring training game with the Rangers on March 21, 1975, Maddox was hit by a pitch from Jim Bibby in the first inning. In the third, Maddox's bat "slipped" out of his hands toward Bibby on the pitchers mound. In the sixth, Stan Thomas fired a pitch over Maddox's head. In the seventh, Yankees pitcher Mike Wallace retaliated by throwing two pitches close to second baseman Dave Nelson's head. The second one knocked him down, causing both benches to clear. The whole situation was incited by negative comments about Billy Martin that Maddox had made in the press a week earlier.

Maddox proceeded to have another great season in 1975, until an injury cut it short. In the ninth inning of a night game against the Chicago White Sox on June 13, he slipped on the rain-soaked field in Shea Stadium (where the Yankees played home games in 1974 and 1975) running after a fly ball. At the time of the injury, he was batting .307 (.369 against lefties, and .360 with 2 outs, and runners in scoring position) with a .382 on-base percentage. He'd been hit by a pitch seven times during the regular season, including once by Thomas, and once by Bibby. The Rangers fired Martin 95 games into the season. Shortly afterwards, the Yankees fired Virdon, and replaced him with Martin.

Maddox did not return to the Yankees until June of 1976, and only appeared in five games before reinjuring his knee. He returned in September in time to be, and was part of the Yankees' post season roster. The only time Maddox reached the post season in his career, Maddox went two for nine, with an RBI in game three of the 1976 American League Championship Series against the Kansas City Royals. He had one hit, a triple in five at bats against Cincinnati's "Big Red Machine" in the World Series.

== Baltimore Orioles ==
In a transaction involving three center fielders, Maddox and Rick Bladt were dealt from the Yankees to the Baltimore Orioles for Paul Blair on January 20, 1977. Maddox, whose first knee operation in September 1975 failed to completely correct all problems, underwent a second and more successful surgery on November 29, 1976, over the objections of Yankees general manager Gabe Paul who thought it was unnecessary and thus traded him for that reason. Maddox's Orioles debut was delayed by his rehabilitation from that second knee operation. By the time Maddox finally joined the O's in mid July, Al Bumbry established himself as a .300 hitter, and earned the starting center field job. The Orioles were on the road when Maddox joined his new club on July 14. When they returned home, Orioles PA announcer Rex Barney mistakenly referred to him as "Lester Maddox," mixing him up with the segregationist former governor of Georgia.

Maddox went two for twelve to start his Orioles career. A return to Yankee Stadium helped get him out of this slump. He went three for four with a double and a walk in his first game back. The next day, he delivered an eighth inning two run single in his team's come from behind victory over Martin and the Yankees. He batted .262 with two home runs and nine RBIs in a part-time role in his half season in Baltimore. After which, he filed for free agency.

== New York Mets ==
Maddox became just the second free agent in franchise history when he signed with the New York Mets on November 30, 1977. The Orioles attempted to retain him but weren't able to match the Mets' fully guaranteed $1 million offer. While Mets manager Joe Torre considered Maddox his best defensive center fielder, the one star the ninety loss Mets had in 1978 was center fielder Lee Mazzilli. Therefore, Maddox was shifted to right field upon his return to New York. Unfortunately, that return was delayed until the eighteenth game of the season due to a pulled leg muscle suffered in Spring training.

Maddox's bat was cool when he first got activated (.233 avg. through May), but his propensity for drawing a walk still had him on base at a .362 rate. By the end of the season, he brought his average up to .257, while drawing a career high 71 walks for a .370 on base percentage. He also made 43 appearances at third (38 starts), the most in his career. This displeased Maddox, and the following Spring, he indicated that he would like to be traded.

Regardless, Maddox went into the 1979 season with the Mets. His wish to play right field was granted, however, a mid April ankle injury knocked him out of the line up for eighteen games. Meanwhile, Joel Youngblood, who was in a similar positionless situation as Maddox, took over in right field. In Maddox's absence, Youngblood batted .327 with four home runs and eleven RBIs to take the right field job away. When Maddox returned, his role was, once again, undefined. He was sidelined a second time in late July by a pulled hamstring, which kept him out of the line up for another month.

By the time Spring training 1980 got under way, the Mets were set with Maddox at third and Youngblood in right. Maddox, once again, expressed displeasure with this decision. Regardless, he did a more than adequate job at third (.956 fielding percentage. League average, .948) while putting together his first full, healthy season since 1974. He hit a career high four home runs, and led the league in being hit by pitches (6), however, his overall production dipped (.246 avg.).

== Retirement ==
With young prospects Mookie Wilson (center field) and Hubie Brooks (third base) both set to open the season with the Mets in 1981, Maddox became the odd man out, and was released with a year remaining on his contract. Maddox returned to the Yankees during Spring training 1981, but failed to make the club. In June, he signed as a free agent with the Philadelphia Phillies. He spent the season with their triple A affiliate, the Oklahoma City 89ers, before retiring.

== Career statistics ==
Seasons	Games	PA	AB	Runs	Hits	2B	3B	HR	RBI	SB	BB	HBP	SO	Avg.	OBP	Fld%
11	1029	3340	2843	360	742	121	16	18	234	60	409	34	358	.261	.358	.976

He had a career .989 fielding percentage as an outfielder.

== Maddox v. City of New York ==
Maddox sued the New York Yankees as his employer, the New York Mets as lessees of Shea Stadium, and the City of New York as owners of the stadium following his injury in 1975. While a lower court ruled in Maddox's favor in 1983, the New York Court of Appeals ruled six to none against Maddox in the notable decision Maddox v. City of New York (1985). The decision read as follows:

The deposition testimony of plaintiff, a professional baseball player, that he was aware of the wet & muddy condition of the playing field on the night he was injured and of the particular puddle in which he fell, that he had during the game called the attention of the grounds keepers to the fact that there was puddling on the field and had previously commented a couple of times to the baseball club manager when the field was wet, established his awareness of the defect which caused his injury and of the risk involved. His continued participation in the game in light of that awareness constituted assumption of risk as a matter of law, entitling defendants to summary judgment. There should, therefore, be an affirmance, with costs, of the Appellate Division order.

Maddox was arrested for grand theft in 2000 on charges of workman's comp fraud related to this injury. Working as a counselor for Florida's Division of Children & Families, Maddox collected $36,000 in pay and medical benefits in 1998 and 1999 after filing a claim that he was too hobbled to work. DCF Investigators videotaped Maddox walking, running, bending both knees, performing pitching windups and carrying baseball equipment while running baseball camps in his hometown of Coral Springs, Florida. He was cleared of charges in 2003.

== Personal life ==
Maddox began considering Judaism in high school, and took Judaic studies courses while at the University of Michigan, and converted to Judaism in 1975. Maddox also took pre-med courses before switching to pre-law, and graduated in 1976 in the midst of his baseball career.

After retiring from baseball, Maddox became an investment banker. He returned to baseball as a hitting instructor with the Yankees in 1990 and 1991. Shortly after his move to Coral Springs, he became a foster-care counselor for Broward County.

Maddox enjoyed world travel, and coached baseball and football in his part-time home of Israel. He also established the first Little League teams in Poland. In 2004, he was inducted into the Jewish Sports Hall of Fame. In 2007, Maddox was inducted into the Union County Baseball Hall of Fame.

== See also ==
- List of Jewish Major League Baseball players
