= Jim Foor =

American baseball player (born 1949)

- Relief pitcher
- Born: January 13, 1949 (age 77); St. Louis, Missouri, U.S.
- Batted: Left Threw: Left

MLB debut
- April 9, 1971, for the Detroit Tigers

Last MLB appearance
- September 27, 1973, for the Pittsburgh Pirates

MLB statistics
- Win–loss record: 1–0
- Earned run average: 12.00
- Strikeouts: 5
- Stats at Baseball Reference

Teams
- Detroit Tigers (1971–1972); Pittsburgh Pirates (1973)

James Emerson Foor (born January 13, 1949) is an American former professional baseball player. He was a left-handed pitcher who appeared in 13 Major League games played (but only six innings), all as a relief pitcher, for the Detroit Tigers and the Pittsburgh Pirates between 1971 and 1973.

Foor went to McClure High School in Florissant, Missouri, before being drafted in the first round, 15th overall, by the Tigers in 1967. Jim made his debut with the Tigers on April 9, 1971. He pitched 3 games for them total that year, giving up 2 earned runs, walking 4 and striking out 2. In 1972, Foor once again struggled with control, walking 6 in just 3 and 2/3 innings. He ended that season with one win and a 14.73 E.R.A.

He was traded with Norm McRae from the Tigers to the Pirates for Dick Sharon at the Winter Meetings on November 27, 1972. In 1973, Foor pitched in three games for the Pirates, walking one, striking out one and giving up no earned runs. After the season, on March 28, 1974, Foor was once again traded by the Pittsburgh Pirates to the Kansas City Royals for Wayne Simpson. He would never play again in the major leagues, and finished his career with a 1–0 record, a 12.00 earned run average, and five strikeouts.
