= Mickey Lolich =

American baseball player (1940–2026)

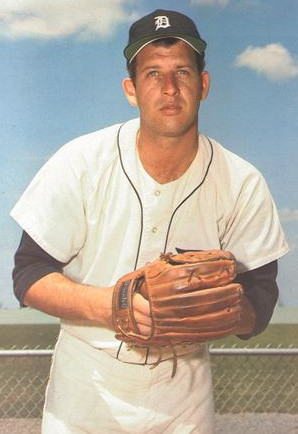
- Lolich with the Detroit Tigers in 1975
- Pitcher
- Born: September 12, 1940; Portland, Oregon, U.S.
- Died: February 4, 2026 (aged 85); Sterling Heights, Michigan, U.S.
- Batted: Switch Threw: Left

MLB debut
- May 12, 1963, for the Detroit Tigers

Last MLB appearance
- September 23, 1979, for the San Diego Padres

MLB statistics
- Win–loss record: 217–191
- Earned run average: 3.44
- Strikeouts: 2,832
- Stats at Baseball Reference

Teams
- Detroit Tigers (1963–1975); New York Mets (1976); San Diego Padres (1978–1979)

Career highlights and awards
- 3× All-Star (1969, 1971, 1972); World Series champion (1968); World Series MVP (1968); MLB wins leader (1971); MLB strikeout leader (1971)

Michael Stephen Lolich (/ˈloʊlɪtʃ/ LOH-litch; September 12, 1940 – February 4, 2026) was an American left-handed pitcher in Major League Baseball who played from 1963 until 1979, almost entirely for the Detroit Tigers. A three-time All-Star, he won at least 14 games every year from 1964 through 1974, striking out at least 200 batters seven times. Lolich was named the Most Valuable Player of the 1968 World Series against the defending champion St. Louis Cardinals after earning three complete-game victories, including a 4-1 win over future Hall-of-Famer Bob Gibson in the climactic Game 7. He was runner-up for the 1971 American League (AL) Cy Young Award after leading the league with 25 wins, 308 strikeouts, 29 complete games and 376 innings pitched, also setting team records in strikeouts and with 45 games started, and helped lead the Tigers to a 1972 division title with 22 victories.

By 1975, Lolich ranked fifth in major league history in career strikeouts, though by the time of his retirement in 1979, his final total of 2,832 had slipped to seventh place. He held the major league record for career strikeouts by a left-handed pitcher from 1975 until 1980, when Steve Carlton passed him, and the AL record from 1973 until 2017, when CC Sabathia broke the mark. He holds Tigers franchise records of 2,679 strikeouts, 459 games started and 39 shutouts, and his 207 wins and 3,361 2/3 innings pitched for Detroit are franchise records for a left-hander, as were his 508 games pitched until John Hiller passed him in 1979.

== Early years ==
Lolich was born in Portland, Oregon, on September 12, 1940, and was of Croatian descent. He was born right-handed, but began to throw left-handed after a childhood accident. At age two, he rode his tricycle into a parked motorcycle, which fell on him. The accident broke his left collarbone, requiring him to wear a cast for four months. Post-injury efforts to strengthen the left arm helped Lolich develop into throwing left-handed. A sportswriter in 1964 wrote of Lolich, who was known as an eccentric: "He now eats, writes and bats right-handed, pitches left-handed and thinks sideways."

As a teenager, he excelled playing in American Legion Baseball and in the Babe Ruth League, setting Oregon state records for strikeouts. He attended Lincoln High School in Portland and posted a record of 19 wins against 5 losses for the school team in 1958.

== Professional baseball ==
=== Early career ===
Lolich was signed by the Detroit Tigers as an amateur free agent at age 17 on June 30, 1958. He began his professional career playing the 1959, 1960, and 1961 seasons with the Knoxville Smokies of the South Atlantic League and the Durham Bulls of the Carolina League. In his first three seasons, he compiled a 17–29 record in 82 games.

Lolich was assigned to the Triple-A Denver Bears at the start of the 1962 season and went 0–4 with a 16.50 ERA in nine games. After the poor start, Detroit ordered him back to Knoxville. Lolich refused to report to Knoxville and was placed under indefinite suspension. He returned home to Oregon and struck out all 12 batters he faced in a four-inning outing in semi-pro ball with the Archer Blower team in Portland. In early June, Lolich was acquired by the Portland Beavers of the Pacific Coast League in a deal with the Tigers. Lolich turned his career around, compiling a 10–9 record and 3.95 ERA with 138 strikeouts in 23 games with the Beavers. The key to Lolich's turnaround was finding control of his pitches. He had developed a reputation as "a flamethrowing wildman" in the minors but developed his control while playing for Portland.

=== Detroit Tigers ===
==== 1963–1967 ====
Buoyed by a strong performance with Portland, Lolich was reclaimed by the Tigers in 1963. He irked Detroit's management by reporting late to spring training, saying he had remained in Portland to take an examination to become a mailman during the off-season. He was cut by the Tigers on April 3 and optioned to the Syracuse Chiefs, then recalled to Detroit on May 9 after compiling a 2.45 ERA in 22 innings at Syracuse. He made his major league debut on May 12 and secured his first win on May 28, allowing one run in nine innings against the Los Angeles Angels. He was plagued by lack of run support during his rookie campaign, losing a 2–1 decision on July 29, allowing only one hit through 8 1/3 innings before giving up a home run in the ninth inning. He finished the 1963 season with a 5–9 record, 3.55 ERA, and 103 strikeouts in 144 1/3 innings pitched.

Lolich blossomed in 1964 with an 18–9 record and 3.41 ERA in 232 innings pitched. He pitched his first shutout, a three-hitter against the Minnesota Twins, on April 24. On September 9, he pitched his sixth shutout of the season and struck out 12 Yankees. For the season, Lolich ranked fourth in the American League with six shutouts and fifth with 192 strikeouts.

In November 1964, Lolich married Joyce Fleenor, a former airline stewardess from Los Angeles. At spring training in 1965, Lolich told reporter Joe Falls that marriage had a calming influence on him: "She's done so much for me, to settle me down, that I can hardly put it into words. She's made me a very happy guy."

In 1965, he compiled a 15–9 record with a 3.44 ERA. His 226 strikeouts ranked second in the American League behind Sam McDowell. Always known as a weak hitter, Lolich hit .058 and struck out 37 times in 86 at-bats during the 1965 season.

After two strong seasons, Lolich regressed in 1966. His ERA jumped by more than a run to 4.77, and he compiled a 14–14 record in 40 games. After the season, Lolich rejected claims that his weight was the problem. He noted that he weighed 200 pounds when he won 18 games in 1964 and weighed only two pounds more in 1966. Lolich instead opined: "The big problem for me was loss of concentration. I blew a lot of leads this year."

In 1967, the Tigers hired former major league pitcher Johnny Sain as their pitching coach. Sain helped develop Lolich's pitching skills and taught him psychological aspects of pitching. The 1967 season was a memorable one for the tight four-way pennant race among the Tigers, Boston Red Sox, Minnesota Twins, and Chicago White Sox. The Tigers were in contention until the final day of the 1967 season, finishing one game behind the Red Sox. Lolich finished the season with a 14–13 record, but led the league with six shutouts and posted a 3.04 ERA.

In late July 1967, Lolich was called to active duty with the Michigan Air National Guard in response to the ongoing Detroit riot. Lolich spent twelve days on active duty and was promoted to Airman First Class. Upon returning to the team, he received death threats, allegedly from the Black Panthers, for his role in quelling the riot. In response, the Federal Bureau of Investigation placed a team of snipers on the roof of Tiger Stadium during his subsequent two starts.

==== 1968 World Series championship ====
In 1968, the Tigers quickly rose to first place, winning nine straight after losing the season opener to Boston. Lolich was overshadowed by teammate Denny McLain's 31-win season, and was sent to the bullpen in August due to a late-season slump. He made six appearances as a relief pitcher before returning to the starting rotation. He posted a 17–9 record with 197 strikeouts, as the Tigers won the American League pennant by 12 games over the second-place Baltimore Orioles.

After Bob Gibson defeated McLain in Game 1 of the 1968 World Series in St. Louis, Lolich helped Detroit recover by allowing only one run in an 8–1 Game 2 win. He also helped his own cause by hitting the only home run of his 16-year career. But the Tigers lost the next two games at home to fall behind the Cardinals 3–1 and were facing elimination when Lolich returned to pitch in Game 5, just four days after pitching a complete game. Despite an unsettled start, when he surrendered an RBI single to Curt Flood and a two-run home run to Orlando Cepeda in the first inning, Lolich remained calm and proceeded to pitch eight scoreless innings as the Tigers scored two runs in the fourth and took the lead in the seventh on Al Kaline's bases loaded two-run single. They added another run for a 5–3 win, staving off elimination.

Back in St. Louis, the Tigers then won Game 6 by a score of 13–1 behind McLain's solid pitching and a grand slam home run from Jim Northrup in a Series-record-tying ten-run third inning rally to force Game 7. With just two days of rest, and having pitched two complete games in the past week, Lolich faced Gibson in Game 7, both having won their previous two starts. They each pitched six scoreless innings, Lolich picking off Lou Brock and Curt Flood to end a Cardinal threat in the bottom of the sixth, before the Tigers broke through with three runs in the top of the seventh starting with a two-out, two-run triple to deep center by Northrup just over Flood's head for an eventual 4–1 Tigers win and a 4–3 Series triumph.

Detroit became only the third team in World Series history to rally from a 3–1 series deficit to win in seven games. Having completed Game 7, Lolich became the 12th pitcher to win three games in a World Series, and the last with three complete games in a single Series. He was the last pitcher with three victories in the same World Series until Randy Johnson won 3 games in the 2001 World Series. He is the only left-handed pitcher with three complete-game wins in the same World Series in baseball history. No other pitcher has thrown three complete game World Series victories in the same series since. Lolich's performance earned him the World Series Most Valuable Player Award.

==== 1969–1975 ====
In 1969, Lolich went 19–11 with a 3.14 ERA, and earned his first All-Star selection. He struck out 16 batters in a game twice in 1969, his career high, and posted 271 strikeouts, his highest total to date. He lost a then-career high 19 games in the 1970 season despite a respectable 3.80 ERA, but he would bounce back the very next year. 1971 marked the best season of Lolich's career, when he led the American League in victories (25), games started (45), complete games (29), and innings pitched (376), all career-highs, while his 2.92 ERA was the lowest to this point of his career. His 308 strikeouts in 1971, also a career high, remain a Tigers' team record through the 2026 season. At the 1971 All-Star Game which featured 21 future members of the Baseball Hall of Fame, Lolich pitched the final two innings to preserve the first All-Star game victory by an American League team since 1962. He finished second to Vida Blue in the 1971 Cy Young Award voting. Lolich became known for his endurance and his ability to pitch complete games. He reached the 300-innings pitched mark every season between 1971 and 1974.

Lolich won 22 games and posted a career-best 2.50 ERA in 1972 to help the Tigers win the American League Eastern Division championship. He pitched impressively in the 1972 American League Championship Series against the Oakland Athletics, posting a 1.42 ERA in two starts. In Game 1, he pitched 10 innings allowing only 1 run before losing the game in the bottom of the 11th inning after giving up two runs (one unearned). He pitched nine innings in Game 4, again allowing only 1 run, but the win went to reliever John Hiller after the Tigers rallied in the 10th inning. The Tigers eventually lost the series to Oakland in five games. He finished third in the 1972 Cy Young Award voting behind Gaylord Perry and Wilbur Wood.

Lolich won 16 games in both 1973 and 1974. However, the Tigers dropped to last place in the American League East as the team transitioned to younger players. In 1975, Lolich eclipsed Warren Spahn’s Major League Baseball record of 2,583 career strikeouts by a left-handed pitcher. Although Lolich pitched effectively with a 3.78 ERA in 1975, the Tigers' poor performance continued as they failed to provide him with much offensive support during a 12–18 season. He received only 14 runs of support during a 14-game stretch in which his win–loss record was 1–13, even though he managed to post a respectable 3.88 earned run average during that span.

=== Mets and Padres ===
Lolich was traded along with Billy Baldwin to the New York Mets for Rusty Staub and Bill Laxton on December 12, 1975. As a major leaguer for at least ten years with the last five on the same ballclub, he had initially exercised his right to veto, which he eventually lifted after his attorney and Mets administrators M. Donald Grant, Joe McDonald, and Bob Scheffing convinced him that the transaction was financially beneficial and would not negatively affect his family.

Much like 1975 in Detroit, Lolich received poor run support with the Mets, posting an 8–13 record despite a solid 3.22 ERA for the 1976 season; however, he had disagreements with the Mets pitching coach as well as the Mets trainer and retired after the season. He opened a doughnut shop in suburban Detroit and sat out the 1977 season. He returned to baseball in 1978, signing with the San Diego Padres as a free agent.

He played mostly as a relief pitcher for the Padres in 1978, going 2–1 with a 1.56 ERA in 20 games. The following season, Lolich added a knuckleball to his pitching. Lolich had an inconsistent season in 1979 and decided to retire. He pitched in his final major league game on September 23, 1979, at the age of 39.

== Career statistics ==
In a 16-year major league career, Lolich played in 586 games, accumulating a 217–191 win–loss record along with a 3.44 earned run average. He struck out 200 or more batters in a season seven times in his career. His 2,832 career strikeouts were the most by a left-handed pitcher in Major League history until he was surpassed by Steve Carlton in 1981, and the most in the American League by a left-handed pitcher until being surpassed by CC Sabathia in 2017. Lolich threw 41 shutouts and 195 complete games during his career, completing nearly 40 percent of his starts. He holds Detroit Tigers team records in single-season strikeouts (308), career strikeouts (2,679), shutouts (39), games started (459), and home runs allowed (329). He had a career postseason ERA of 1.57 in five starts.

In 1,017 plate appearances, he had 105 walks and 90 hits. He has the most career plate appearances of anyone with more walks than hits.

== Life after baseball ==
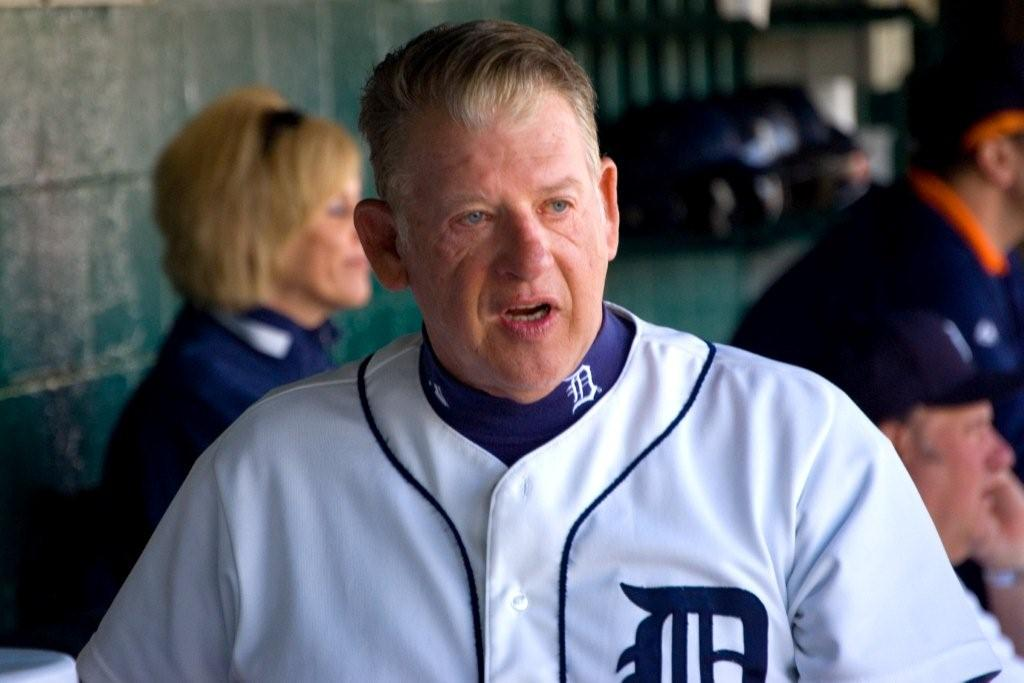
Lolich in 2009

At the end of his playing career, Lolich did work as a manufacturer's representative. One day on a trip to work, he stopped for breakfast at a doughnut shop and became friends with the proprietor, who offered him to be partners in the shop. For a time, he worked at the doughnut shop in the day and selling "A. C. Spark Plugs or Buick lighters" before a series of auto industry cuts saw him focus exclusively on the doughnut business.

In 1979, Lolich invested in a doughnut shop in Rochester, Michigan, with the understanding that his partner would run the business. Following disagreements, Lolich bought out his partner and began running the business. In 1983, after losing his lease, he moved the doughnut business to Lake Orion. As late as 1984, Lolich had a glass den that held 216 1/2 baseballs that represented his 216 victories and half of a ball for a relief victory. In the late 1990s, Lolich sold the doughnut shop and retired. He remained active in charity work and served as a coach at the Detroit Tigers' baseball fantasy camp in Lakeland, Florida. Because of his humble "everyman" qualities, many long-time Tiger fans celebrate him as one of the most popular sports figures in a working man's city. As The Detroit News put it, "He didn't act like a big shot superstar, he was one of us."

Lolich also had a small role in The Incredible Melting Man, a 1977 horror movie released during his first retirement. He plays a security guard who is killed by the Melting Man near the end of the film.

In 2003, Lolich was one of 26 players chosen for the final ballot by the National Baseball Hall of Fame's Veterans Committee but garnered only 13 votes, far below the 75% required for election. Lolich had previously appeared on the BBWAA Hall of Fame ballot for all 15 years of the allotted time players were eligible to stay on the ballot, topping out at 25.5% of the vote in 1988 before falling off of the ballot in 1999.

In 1982, Lolich was inducted into the Michigan Sports Hall of Fame. In October 2022, he was inducted in the Croatian-American Sports Hall of Fame.

Lolich died at a care facility in Sterling Heights, Michigan, on February 4, 2026, at the age of 85.

== Lolich's other records and accomplishments ==
- His 2,679 strikeouts in the American League is the 9th-most in AL history and 2nd most by a left-hander.
- His 2,832 career strikeouts in both leagues was the 7th most in major league history and the most by a left-hander when he retired in 1979. Through 2025, he has the fifth-most strikeouts by a left-handed pitcher in MLB history.
- His 1,538 batters faced in 1971 was the most in the majors since George Uhle faced 1,548 in 1923. Only two other pitchers have faced at least 1,500 hitters since 1923, Wilbur Wood with 1,531 in 1973 and Bob Feller with 1,512 in 1946.
- His 376 innings pitched in 1971 is the second highest in the majors since 1917. Wilbur Wood holds the modern record with 376 2/3 just a year later, 1972. Only four have pitched 350 or more innings in a season since 1929: Wilbur Wood (1972 and 1973), Lolich (1971), Bob Feller (1946) and Tiger forerunner Dizzy Trout (1944).
- His 29 complete games in 1971 was the highest in the AL since Bob Feller's 36 in 1946.
- In the ten-year span from 1965 to 1974, he struck out more (2,245) than any other major league pitcher. Bob Gibson was second with 2,117 during the same period.
- In that same span, he was second in major league innings pitched (2,744 2/3) to Gaylord Perry's 2,978.
- In the same span, he had more wins (172) than any other AL pitcher. Gaylord Perry led the majors with 182.
- In the same span, he threw more complete games (155) than any other AL hurler. Gaylord Perry led the majors with 205.
- He is the only left-hander with three complete World Series games in the same Series.
- Lolich started 324 games with Bill Freehan playing as catcher, setting a major league record for most starts together as a battery that stood until Adam Wainwright and Yadier Molina of the St. Louis Cardinals broke it in 2022.

== See also ==
- List of Major League Baseball annual strikeout leaders
- List of Major League Baseball annual wins leaders
- List of Major League Baseball career hit batsmen leaders
- List of Major League Baseball career strikeout leaders
- List of Major League Baseball career wins leaders
