= Jack Whillock =

American baseball player (1942–2021)

- Pitcher
- Born: November 4, 1942; Clinton, Arkansas, U.S.
- Died: December 20, 2021 (aged 79); Arlington, Texas, U.S.
- Batted: Right Threw: Right

MLB debut
- August 29, 1971, for the Detroit Tigers

Last MLB appearance
- September 21, 1971, for the Detroit Tigers

MLB statistics
- Won–lost record: 0–2
- Earned run average: 5.63
- Strikeouts: 6
- Stats at Baseball Reference

Teams
- Detroit Tigers (1971)

Jack Franklin Whillock (November 4, 1942 – December 20, 2021) was an American professional baseball pitcher who spent seven games in Major League Baseball as a member of the Detroit Tigers in 1971. Born in Clinton, Arkansas, he graduated from high school there, then played baseball for the University of Arkansas Razorbacks. Whillock, a right-hander, was listed as 6 feet 3 inches (1.91 m) tall and 195 pounds (88 kg).

After graduating from the University of Arkansas, Whillock was signed by the St. Louis Cardinals prior to the 1964 season and spent five years in their farm system. Released by the Cardinals in October 1968, he signed with the Tigers' organization the following year. Whillock made his major league debut with Detroit on August 29, 1971, at the age of 28, following a stellar year as a relief pitcher for Double-A Montgomery, where he posted a 1.19 earned run average, five wins and 15 saves in 37 games pitched.

As a Tiger, Whillock made seven relief appearances, posting an 0–2 record with a 5.63 ERA, allowing ten hits, two walks, and five earned runs in eight innings pitched. He was credited with six strikeouts and one save, which came September 8 against the Washington Senators at RFK Stadium. Both of his defeats (and all of his earned runs allowed) came at the hands of the Boston Red Sox, who defeated him on September 9 at Tiger Stadium and September 21 at Fenway Park, his final MLB game.

Whillock spent 1972 at Triple-A, going 6–4 with a 2.40 ERA in 45 relief appearances with the Toledo Mud Hens. Then, on January 22, 1973, he was traded to the Montreal Expos for minor leaguer Don Koonce.

Though his time in the major leagues was short, his minor-league career lasted 11 seasons, from 1964 to 1974, Whillock went 63–76 with a 3.46 ERA, appearing in 391 games, while starting 97 of them.

Whillock died in Arlington, Texas, on December 20, 2021.
