= Denny McLain =

American baseball pitcher (born 1944)

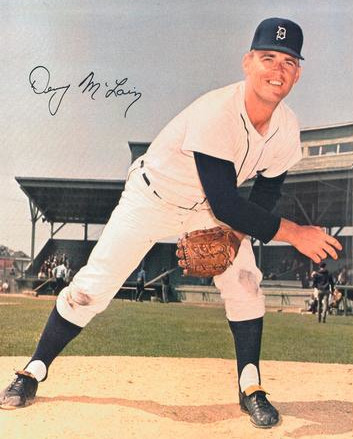
- McLain in 1966
- Pitcher
- Born: March 29, 1944 (age 82); Markham, Illinois, U.S.
- Batted: Right Threw: Right

MLB debut
- September 21, 1963, for the Detroit Tigers

Last MLB appearance
- September 12, 1972, for the Atlanta Braves

MLB statistics
- Win–loss record: 131–91
- Earned run average: 3.39
- Strikeouts: 1,282
- Stats at Baseball Reference

Teams
- Detroit Tigers (1963–1970); Washington Senators (1971); Oakland Athletics (1972); Atlanta Braves (1972)

Career highlights and awards
- 3× All-Star (1966, 1968, 1969); World Series champion (1968); AL MVP (1968); 2× AL Cy Young Award (1968, 1969); 2× AL wins leader (1968, 1969)

Dennis Dale McLain (born March 29, 1944) is an American former professional baseball player. He played for ten seasons in Major League Baseball as a right-handed pitcher, most prominently as a member of the Detroit Tigers. In 1968, McLain became the last Major League Baseball pitcher to win 30 or more games during a season (with a record of 31–6) — a feat accomplished by only 11 players in the 20th century, with the most recent 34 years earlier.

As a player, McLain was known for his outspoken nature, which occasionally led to conflicts with teammates and fans. His early major league career included notable achievements such as two Cy Young awards and an American League MVP award. While achieving success in baseball, McLain faced legal issues in his personal life, including convictions related to organized crime and embezzlement, for which he served time in prison.

== Professional playing career ==
=== The rise to stardom ===
McLain was born in Markham, Illinois, and attended Mt. Carmel High School in Chicago, where he played on the baseball team as a shortstop and pitcher. As a teenager, he met his future wife, Sharyn Boudreau, the daughter of major league player Lou Boudreau. McLain was also musically talented, learning to play the organ from Bob Creed, the Chicago White Sox organist.

Upon his graduation from high school in June 1962, McLain was signed by the Chicago White Sox as an amateur free agent, and was assigned to play with the Harlan Smokies of the Appalachian League. McLain's minor league debut was notable for throwing a no-hitter and striking out 16 batters in a game against the Salem Rebels on June 28. After just two games with the Smokies, he was promoted to the Clinton C-Sox of the Midwest League, where he posted a record of four wins and seven losses.

At the time, players with one year of service in the minor leagues were subject to a draft if they were not called up to the major leagues. The White Sox left McLain in the minor leagues, and he was selected on waivers by the Detroit Tigers on April 8, 1963. He progressed swiftly through the Tigers' minor league system, jumping from Class A Duluth-Superior to Class AA Knoxville during the summer. The Tigers saw enough promise that they decided to advance him all the way from Class AA to the majors, and he made his major league debut on September 21, 1963 at the age of 19. His debut against the Chicago White Sox was notable, as he allowed one earned run on seven hits. He also picked off two baserunners and hit a home run, which was the only home run of his major-league career. McLain is one of only six teenage pitchers to hit a major-league home run since 1920, a list that includes Hall-of-Famers Don Drysdale and Jim Palmer.

McLain began the 1964 season with the Syracuse Chiefs of the International League, but was called back to the major leagues in early June and ended the season with a won-loss record of 4–5. He then played for the Mayagüez Indians in the Puerto Rico Baseball League, where he posted a 13–2 record and helped the Indians win the league championship. He was called back to the majors in 1965 and continued to pitch well for the Tigers. On June 15, McLain set a major-league record for relief pitchers, when he struck out the first seven batters he faced after entering the game in the first inning to relieve starting pitcher Dave Wickersham. He ended the season with a 16–6 record, a 2.61 earned run average, and 192 strikeouts, the third-highest strikeout total in the American League behind Sam McDowell and teammate Mickey Lolich. Although he had a curveball and a changeup, he relied mostly on his fastball to get batters out.

In 1966, McLain had a 13–4 mid-season record and earned the role of American League starting pitcher in the 1966 All-Star Game, where he threw just 28 pitches to retire all nine batters that he faced. He finished the season with a 20–14 record with a 3.92 earned run average.

In 1967, the Tigers hired former major-league pitcher Johnny Sain as their pitching coach. Sain helped develop McLain's pitching skills and taught him the psychology of pitching. The 1967 season was memorable due to the tight four-way pennant race between the Tigers, the Boston Red Sox, the Minnesota Twins, and the Chicago White Sox. McLain finished with a 17–16 record and a 3.79 earned run average but was winless after August 29. On September 18, McLain reported that he had severely injured two toes on his left foot, saying that he had stubbed them after his foot had fallen asleep. Going into the final game of the season against the California Angels, the Tigers needed a victory to force a one-game playoff with the Red Sox for the American League pennant. McLain pitched ineffectively in the final game and the Tigers lost to finish the season one game behind the Red Sox.

=== The year of the pitcher ===
Ten games into the 1968 season, the Tigers were in first place, having won nine consecutive games after losing the opener. McLain made controversial statements in early May by criticizing Detroit fans for being "the biggest front-running fans in the world." He continued to win games at a remarkable pace, registering his 29th victory on September 10. On September 13, he appeared on the cover of Time. On September 14 at Tiger Stadium, McLain pitched the Tigers to a 5–4 victory over the Oakland Athletics in front of a nationally televised audience to become Major League Baseball's first 30-game winner since 1934. Dizzy Dean, the previous 30-game winner, was on hand to congratulate him.

After the Tigers had clinched the 1968 American League pennant, McLain attracted attention during his 31st and final regular season victory in a game against the Yankees on September 19. McLain had grown up idolizing New York Yankee center fielder Mickey Mantle, who entered the game tied with Jimmie Foxx for third place in the major-league career home runs list. When Mantle—who was nine days away from his last major league appearance—came to bat in the eighth inning with the Tigers leading 6–1, McLain intentionally threw a soft pitch directly over home plate. Other accounts said that he called catcher Jim Price to the mound and had him tell Mantle that he would be throwing only fastballs. Mantle hit the pitch for his 535th career home run (the penultimate home run Mantle would hit in his career), putting him in sole possession of third place on the all-time home run list, behind only Babe Ruth and Willie Mays. After Mantle's home run, McLain remained on the pitcher's mound and acknowledged the moment, while Mantle acknowledged McLain as he rounded the bases. The next batter, Joe Pepitone, waved his bat over the plate, as if asking for an easy pitch of his own. McLain responded by throwing the next pitch over Pepitone's head. After the game, McLain smilingly denied that he had served up an easy pitch for Mantle to hit; however, he was later reprimanded by Major League Baseball Commissioner William Eckert.

McLain completed a 31–6 record along with a 1.96 earned run average, as the Tigers won the American League pennant by 12 games. He had 280 strikeouts and 63 walks, giving him a 4.44 K:BB ratio, a Tigers season record that stood until 2016, when it was eclipsed by Justin Verlander. McLain also earned his second All-Star berth and won the 1968 American League Cy Young Award, as well as the American League Most Valuable Player Award, the first by an American League pitcher since Bobby Shantz in 1952 and the first by a Tiger since fellow pitcher Hal Newhouser's back-to-back honors in 1944 and 1945. He was the first pitcher in American League history to win the Most Valuable Player Award and the Cy Young Award in the same season. St. Louis Cardinal Bob Gibson won the National League's Most Valuable Player Award that same year, making 1968 the only season to date in which a pitcher won the MVP Award in both leagues (it was also the only time both Cy Young Award winners were voted unanimously until 2022). McLain was also the inaugural winner of The Sporting News Sportsman of the Year award.

McLain's performance in the Tigers' 1968 World Series triumph over the Cardinals was not as impressive as his regular season. Having already pitched 336 innings and 28 complete games during the regular season, a sore-armed McLain lost twice to Gibson (including a still-standing World Series record 17-strikeout performance in the opener) to help put the Tigers down three games to one. Trailing three games to two, McLain won the crucial Game 6 on just two days' rest, aided by a grand slam home run from Jim Northrup. Teammate Mickey Lolich won three games during the series, including a complete-game triumph (also on two days’ rest) in Game 7 against Gibson, and won the World Series MVP award. After the season, when McLain was asked about Lolich's performance in the World Series, he responded controversially by saying: "I wouldn't trade one Bob Gibson for 12 Mickey Loliches."

The season became known as the "Year of the Pitcher", with batting averages and run production dropping in both leagues. After the record home-run year by Roger Maris in 1961, the major leagues increased the size of the strike zone from the top of the batter's shoulders to the bottom of the knees. Pitchers such as McLain and Gibson among others dominated hitters, producing 339 shutouts in 1968. Carl Yastrzemski was the only American League hitter to finish the season with a batting average higher than .300. In the National League, Gibson posted a 1.12 earned run average, the lowest in 54 years, while Los Angeles Dodgers pitcher Don Drysdale threw a record 58 2/3 consecutive scoreless innings during the 1968 season. As a result of the dropping offensive statistics, Major League Baseball took steps to reduce the advantage held by pitchers by lowering the height of the pitcher's mound from 15 inches to 10, and by reducing the size of the strike zone for the 1969 season. Since then, no pitcher has won more than 27 games in a season.

=== Later career ===
In January 1969, McLain was selected as the Associated Press Male Athlete of the Year. He created more disruption when he was named as the starting pitcher for the American League in the 1969 All-Star Game in Washington, D.C., but missed the start of the game because of a dental appointment in Detroit. The appointment was scheduled for Wednesday the 23rd, the day after the All-Star game, but because of a rainout on the scheduled date, the game was played on the 23rd.

McLain often deviated from conventional expectations, demonstrating an independent approach. He had learned to fly and purchased an airplane. Having kept his dental appointment, he then flew himself to Washington, arriving at the game during the second inning. He pitched in the fourth inning, but by then the National League had already built a 9–2 lead.

McLain had disagreements with Tigers' manager Mayo Smith, including disputes over the firing of pitching coach Johnny Sain. Despite the troubles, McLain had another productive season in 1969, winning 24 games and a second consecutive Cy Young Award, tying with Baltimore's Mike Cuellar, marking the first time two players had shared the award. It was the last award of his major league career.

=== Downfall ===
In February 1970, Sports Illustrated and Penthouse both published articles about McLain's involvement in bookmaking activities. Sports Illustrated cited sources who alleged that the foot injury suffered by McLain late in 1967 was caused by an organized crime figure who stomped on McLain's foot as punishment for failing to pay off on a lost bet. Early in his career, McLain's interest in betting on horses was piqued by Chuck Dressen, one of his first managers. McLain's involvement in gambling reportedly began following a discussion about shared interests with a Pepsi representative. (When he pitched, he was known to drink a Pepsi between innings.) A representative from Pepsi then offered McLain a contract with the company, just for doing a few endorsements. McLain soon realized that he and the Pepsi representative shared an affinity for gambling; when the two realized how much money they were losing, and that they could earn so much more by "taking the action" on bets, they attempted to set up a bookmaking operation as hands-off, silent partners.

McLain was suspended indefinitely by Baseball Commissioner Bowie Kuhn; the suspension was then set for the first three months of the 1970 season. He returned in mid-season, but struggled to pitch well. In September, the Tigers suspended him for seven days after he doused sportswriters Jim Hawkins of the Detroit Free Press and Watson Spoelstra of The Detroit News with buckets of water. Just as the seven-day suspension was about to end, he was suspended for at least the remainder of the season by Kuhn for carrying a gun on a team flight. McLain's 1970 season ended with a won-loss record of only 3–5. Later that year, he was forced into bankruptcy despite being the first $100,000 player in Tigers history. Meanwhile, McLain and his teammate Jim Northrup schemed together to make more money; they were back in Detroit furthering a plan that they shared to generate a nude baseball model calendar. These efforts eventually fell short.

On October 9, 1970, the Tigers traded McLain, Elliott Maddox, Norm McRae, and Don Wert to the Washington Senators for Joe Coleman, Eddie Brinkman, Jim Hannan, and Aurelio Rodríguez. Kuhn actually had to clear the trade because McLain was still under suspension, and suspended players cannot be traded without the commissioner's permission. Kuhn later wrote in his autobiography, Hardball: The Education of a Baseball Commissioner, that he was shocked at what he called a "foolish gamble" by the Senators, and predicted that the trade would turn out to be a Tiger heist.

The McLain trade occurred despite objections from Senators manager Ted Williams, who reportedly disagreed with the decision. The feeling was mutual; early in the 1971 season, McLain became the ringleader of the "Underminders Club", a small group of disgruntled teammates dedicated to getting Williams fired at all costs. They spent much of the season feuding over Williams' use of a then-unusual five-man rotation for his starters. Senators broadcaster Shelby Whitfield later told Rob Neyer that when Williams yanked McLain early from a July 5 game against the Cleveland Indians, McLain threatened to call Senators owner Bob Short and have him fire Williams immediately.

By this time, McLain had serious arm trouble, inadvertently made worse by numerous cortisone shots he took for his sore arm. As a result, he essentially stopped throwing fastballs midway through the 1971 season. Due to his arm troubles and his inability to get along with Williams, McLain went 10–22. He thus earned the dubious distinction of going from a league-leader in wins (tied with Mike Cuellar with 24 wins in 1969) to a league-leader in losses only two years later. McLain's 22 defeats (a mark later tied by three pitchers, all in 1974) remains the most in a major-league season since Jack Fisher of the Mets lost 24 in 1965.

After the 1971 season, McLain was traded to the Oakland Athletics for journeyman pitcher Jim Panther and prospect Don Stanhouse (who went on to have a few good years as the Baltimore Orioles' closer in the late 1970s). After only five starts, one win, and a 6.04 ERA, the Athletics sent him to the minor leagues on May 15. The Associated Press said the reasons for the demotion were "pitches which lacked steam and a medical problem." On June 29, Oakland traded him to the Atlanta Braves for Orlando Cepeda; he went only 3–5 for Atlanta, and his overall totals for 1972 were 4–7 with a 6.37 ERA. His final major league appearance came on September 12 against the Cincinnati Reds; he came into a tied game in the ninth and promptly gave up three runs without retiring a batter, taking the loss. (Coincidentally, the last batter McLain ever faced in the major leagues was Pete Rose, who also was involved in a gambling scandal years later.) The Braves released McLain during spring training, on March 26, 1973. After short stints with minor-league clubs in Des Moines and Shreveport, McLain retired. Three years after winning 31 games and two years after winning his second consecutive Cy Young, he was out of baseball at the age of 29.

== Music career ==
McLain's success on the playing field led to endorsement opportunities from the Hammond Organ Company; he also made musical appearances in Las Vegas. He was invited to appear with his musical quartet on The Ed Sullivan Show along with his World Series opponent (and guitarist) Bob Gibson. McLain also made appearances on The Steve Allen Show and The Joey Bishop Show. He also released two albums on Capitol Records, Denny McLain at the Organ (1968) and Denny McLain in Las Vegas (1969).

== Career statistics ==
In a 10-year major-league career, McLain won 131 games against 91 losses. His career earned run average was 3.39 and he recorded 1,282 strikeouts in 1,886 innings pitched. McLain was a three-time All-Star and won the Cy Young Award twice in his career. Because he relied so much on his fastball, he also surrendered numerous home runs, leading the American League in home runs allowed in three consecutive years (1966–1968).

Since McLain's 31-win season, only two other pitchers have approached the 30-game milestone (Steve Carlton won 27 games in 1972 and Bob Welch also with 27 victories in 1990). With Major League Baseball teams transitioning from the four-man pitching rotation of McLain's era to five-man rotations, and with the increased reliance on relief pitchers, some observers believe that another 30-game winner may not occur because of the way the game is played today.

W	L	WP	GP	GS	CG	SHO	SV	IP	H	R	ER	BB	SO	ERA	WHIP
131	91	.590	280	264	105	29	2	1,886.0	1,646	778	711	548	1,282	3.39	1.16

== Post-major league career ==
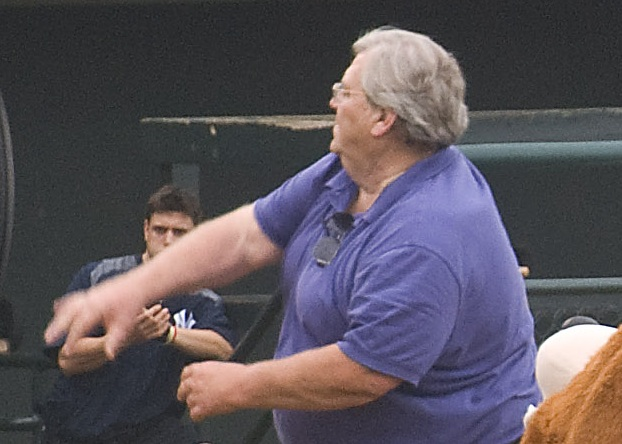
McLain throws out the first pitch on July 11, 2012, at Joseph P. Riley Jr. Park in Charleston, South Carolina.

In 1974, McLain played a season for the London Majors of the Intercounty Baseball League at Labatt Memorial Park in London, Ontario. Because of his arm problems, McLain pitched only nine innings for the Majors, but played in 14 games at shortstop, first base, or catcher, and batted .380, including hitting two homers in one game in London.

McLain continued to earn side money playing the organ at clubs, including a club in suburban Detroit where former heavyweight boxing champion Leon Spinks worked as a bartender. McLain also earned quite a bit of money hustling golf, easily attracting "marks" due to his past baseball fame. Additionally, he reportedly once accepted over $160,000 to fly a wanted felon out of the country.

McLain's weight ballooned to 330 pounds (150 kg) during his post-baseball career. He was imprisoned for drug trafficking (cocaine), embezzlement, and racketeering. Tampa attorneys Arnold Levine and Stevan Northcutt, who later became a Florida state appellate judge, represented McLain before the United States Court of Appeals for the Eleventh Circuit in Atlanta. His conviction was reversed under the Racketeer Influenced and Corrupt Organizations Act in the United States District Court for the Middle District of Florida in Tampa.

Between his stints in prison and rehabilitation in the mid-1980s to the early-1990s, McLain could be found on various talk radio sports shows and occasionally on panel-format sports shows on network television in the Detroit area; he also modeled Hanes underwear. He could also be found signing autographs at a metro Detroit 7-Eleven store at the corner of Mound Road and Metro Parkway in Sterling Heights, Michigan, where he was employed on work-release. After his release, he also hosted a popular daily talk radio show for a few years on Detroit talk station WXYT.

McLain's oldest daughter, Kristin, 26, was killed on March 20, 1992, in a drunk-driving crash. She had been living in Florida and was moving back home to Michigan when she was killed just a few miles from her parents' home. In part to escape his grief, McLain and several partners bought the Peet Packing Company (Farmer Peet's) located in the small town of Chesaning, Michigan, in 1994. McLain was also a partner in the Michigan Radio Network. Both companies went bankrupt two years later. In 1996, he was convicted on charges of embezzlement, mail fraud, and conspiracy in connection with the theft of $2.5 million from the Peet employees' pension fund. McLain spent six years in prison; in 2008, he insisted that he knew nothing about the shady financial deals alleged by the government. McLain claims he paid restitution for this incident.

During the Detroit Tigers 2006 playoff run, McLain was the baseball analyst for Drew and Mike on WRIF radio in Detroit. In 2007, McLain released his autobiography I Told You I Wasn't Perfect, co-authored by longtime Detroit sportscaster and author Eli Zaret. Prior to that, McLain and Zaret hosted a sports television show together in Detroit.

McLain currently resides in Pinckney, Michigan. McLain writes a monthly editorial column and blogs regularly for In Play! Magazine, a Detroit sports magazine.

Kevin Costner's character in the 2005 film The Upside of Anger was partly based on McLain (and also partly on Kirk Gibson, another Tiger of World Series note).

On April 11, 2008, McLain was arrested without incident after deputies discovered an outstanding warrant against him for failing to appear for a January 16 court hearing.

On September 22, 2011, McLain was arrested in Port Huron, Michigan at the Canada–United States border after officials discovered an outstanding warrant against him from St. Charles Parish, Louisiana. Because of construction detours, McLain had inadvertently taken an exit off I-94, sending him directly across the Blue Water Bridge and into Canada. He immediately returned to the U.S., where he was obligated to go through U.S. Customs and Border Protection inspection. The outstanding warrant was then discovered, for which McLain was jailed in Port Huron. In less than a week, the warrant was cleared and McLain was released.

From 2017 to 2018, McLain hosted a Sunday radio show about life and politics on WFDF (AM).

In January 2019 McLain and former local sportscasters Eli Zaret and Bob Page launched a podcast called No Filter Sports.

In October 2020, McLain held an estate sale hosted by Aaron's Estate Sales. This event was covered nationally by outlets such as ESPN and the Associated Press.

== See also ==
- List of Detroit Tigers team records
- List of Detroit Tigers Opening Day starting pitchers
- List of Major League Baseball annual wins leaders
- List of World Series starting pitchers
