= Ed Brinkman =

American baseball player (1941–2008)

- Shortstop
- Born: December 8, 1941; Cincinnati, Ohio, U.S.
- Died: September 30, 2008 (aged 66); Cincinnati, Ohio, U.S.
- Batted: Right Threw: Right

MLB debut
- September 6, 1961, for the Washington Senators

Last MLB appearance
- September 28, 1975, for the New York Yankees

MLB statistics
- Batting average: .224
- Home runs: 60
- Runs batted in: 461
- Stats at Baseball Reference

Teams
- Washington Senators (1961–1970); Detroit Tigers (1971–1974); St. Louis Cardinals (1975); Texas Rangers (1975); New York Yankees (1975)

Career highlights and awards
- All-Star (1973); Gold Glove Award (1972)

Edwin Albert Brinkman (December 8, 1941 – September 30, 2008) was an American professional baseball player, coach and scout. He played as a shortstop in Major League Baseball from 1961 to 1975, most prominently as a member of the Washington Senators and the Detroit Tigers.

Brinkman was a light-hitting, defensive specialist who spent the first 10 years of his career with the 1961 expansion team the Washington Senators, before being traded to the Detroit Tigers where he helped lead the team to the 1972 American League Eastern Division title and was voted 1972 Tiger of the Year. He won the American League (AL) Gold Glove Award in 1972, and made his only All-Star team in 1973 while with the Tigers. Brinkman ended his career playing for the St. Louis Cardinals, Texas Rangers, and the New York Yankees.

After his playing career, Brinkman worked for several major league organizations as a scout, coach and minor league manager until he retired in 2000.

== Early life ==
Brinkman was born and raised in Cincinnati, Ohio. He attended Western Hills High School.

Brinkman played third base and pitcher on the Western Hills baseball team and was a teammate of Pete Rose. Paul "Pappy" Nohr, the baseball coach at Western Hills, described Rose as "a good ball player, not a Brinkman." Based on their performance in high school, American Legion, and municipal league baseball, Brinkman was already touted as a junior in 1959 as "one of the most sought after prospects in years." Scouts saw Brinkman rather than Rose as the future superstar. When he was a senior, Brinkman batted .460 and also won 15 games as a pitcher including a perfect game.

Brinkman was also the high scorer on his school's basketball team and "a high ranking student." Brinkman dropped a year due to illness and therefore did not graduate until he was 19 years old in 1961.

== Professional baseball ==
=== Signing and minor leagues ===
After being courted by 17 major league clubs, Brinkman signed with the Washington Senators in May 1961. Brinkman received a large signing bonus of $75,000 from the Senators. Brinkman later said: "Pete [Rose] always kidded me that the Washington Senators brought me my bonus in an armored truck. Pete said he had cashed his at the corner store."

Brinkman began the 1961 season playing for the Senators' Class DD team in Middlesboro, Kentucky, known as "the Senators' rookie camp", in late June. He appeared in only seven games in Middleboro before being transferred to the Senators Class D team in Pensacola, Florida. He played second base at Pensacola, compiling a .290 batting average and 26 RBIs in 53 games. At the end of August 1961, Brinkman was called up by the Senators. He made his major legue debut on September 6, 1961, compiling a .091 batting average in four games at the end of the 1961 season.

=== Washington Senators ===
before making his major league debut with the Senators on September 6, 1961, at age 19. Although Brinkman was known as a good defensive player, he seldom provided much of an offensive contribution for a Senators team that routinely finished near the bottom of the final standings. His best batting average in the first eight years of his career was a .229 average posted in 1966 when he led American League shortstops with a 3.3 defensive Wins Above Replacement (WAR). In 1969, Ted Williams was named as the Senators' manager and, he worked to improve Brinkman's hitting skills. Brinkman responded with a career-high .266 batting average as well as 71 runs scored, also a career-high. Brinkman once again led the league's shortstops with a 3.3 defensive WAR rating in 1969. He continued to improve in 1970 with a career-high 162 hits in 152 games. He also led the league's shortstops in assists and in putouts.

=== Detroit Tigers ===
In 1971, Brinkman was part of an eight-player trade which sent himself, third baseman Aurelio Rodríguez and pitchers Joe Coleman and Jim Hannan from the Senators to the Detroit Tigers in exchange for Denny McLain, Don Wert, Elliott Maddox, and Norm McRae. He had his best season defensively in 1972. Playing in all of the Tigers' 156 games, he set American League fielding records for shortstops with the most consecutive games without an error (72), most consecutive chances without an error (331), fewest errors in 150 games or more (7) and the highest fielding percentage in 150 games or more (.990). He also produced a career-high 49 runs batted in, helping the Tigers clinch the American League Eastern Division championship by a half game over the Boston Red Sox.

Brinkman only appeared in one game of the 1972 American League Championship Series before he was ruled out for the rest of the season due to a ruptured disc in his lower back. The Tigers lost the championship series to the eventual world champions, the Oakland Athletics, in five games. Brinkman's efforts during the regular season earned him the 1972 Gold Glove Award and he was named the recipient of the "Tiger of the Year" award by the Detroit baseball writers. He also finished ninth in voting for the 1972 American League Most Valuable Player Award. Brinkman earned his first and only All-Star Game appearance when he was named as an American League reserve in the 1973 All-Star Game. He hit a career-high 14 home runs in the 1974 season.

=== Three teams in 1975 ===
He was involved in a three-team deal on November 18, 1974, in which he was first traded along with Bob Strampe and Dick Sharon from the Tigers to the San Diego Padres for Nate Colbert and then sent to the St. Louis Cardinals for Sonny Siebert, Alan Foster and Rich Folkers. Danny Breeden went from the Padres to the Cardinals to subsequently complete the transactions. Brinkman appeared in 24 games with the Cardinals before being traded along with Tommy Moore to the Texas Rangers for Willie Davis on June 4, 1975. After only one appearance with the Rangers, his contract was purchased by the New York Yankees on June 13, 1975. He played in 44 games for the Yankees before they gave him his unconditional release on March 29, 1976, as, he continued to be hampered by his back injury. Brinkman played his final major league game on September 28, 1975, at the age of 33.

== Career statistics ==
In a fifteen-year major league career, Brinkman played in 1,845 games, accumulating 1,355 hits in 6,045 at bats for a .224 career batting average along with 60 home runs, 461 runs batted in and an on-base percentage of .280. Defensively, he recorded a .970 fielding percentage as a shortstop.

Brinkman led the AL in games played twice, won a Gold Glove Award at shortstop, and was named to the American League All-Star team in 1973. He holds the American League record for the fewest hits in a season while playing a minimum of 150 games, with 82 hits in 1965.

== Coaching career ==
After his playing career he was hired by the Tigers as a minor league roving fielding instructor in 1976. Brinkman then became a minor league manager in the Detroit organization, leading the 1977 Montgomery Rebels to a first-place finish in the Southern League. He spent 1979 on the Tigers' MLB coaching staff. Later, he was a coach and scout with the Chicago White Sox for 18 years (1983–2000), initially as the ChiSox' MLB infield coach (1983–1988) and then special assignment scout. He retired after the 2000 season.

Ed Brinkman died on September 30, 2008, at the age of 66, due to complications from heart failure. His younger brother, Chuck Brinkman also played in Major League Baseball as a catcher.

== Notes ==
- William A. Cook, "Pete Rose: Baseball All-Time Hit King"
- David M. Jordan, "Pete Rose: A Biography" (Greenwood Press 2004)
