= Aurelio Rodríguez =

Mexican baseball player (1947–2000)

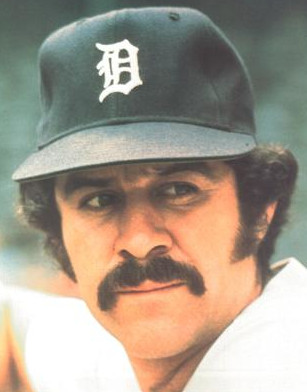
- Rodríguez in 1975
- Third baseman
- Born: December 28, 1947; Cananea, Sonora, Mexico
- Died: September 23, 2000 (aged 52); Detroit, Michigan, U.S.
- Batted: Right Threw: Right

MLB debut
- September 1, 1967, for the California Angels

Last MLB appearance
- October 1, 1983, for the Chicago White Sox

MLB statistics
- Batting average: .237
- Home runs: 124
- Runs batted in: 648
- Stats at Baseball Reference

Teams
- California Angels (1967–1970); Washington Senators (1970); Detroit Tigers (1971–1979); San Diego Padres (1980); New York Yankees (1980–1981); Chicago White Sox (1982); Baltimore Orioles (1983); Chicago White Sox (1983)

Career highlights and awards
- Gold Glove Award (1976)

Member of the Mexican Professional

Baseball Hall of Fame
- Induction: 1995

Aurelio Rodríguez Ituarte, Jr. (December 28, 1947 – September 23, 2000), sometimes known by the nickname "Chi Chi", was a Mexican professional baseball player, who spent the bulk of his Major League career with the Detroit Tigers. Known for his powerful throwing arm, he was one of the great defensive third basemen of his generation. His career range factor of 3.215 per nine innings at third base ranks second in major league history, and his 4,150 assists at the position ranked fifth in major league history at the time of his retirement.

Rodriguez began his career in the Mexican League in 1965 and 1966 and was the league's Rookie of the Year in 1966. He then played 17 seasons in Major League Baseball for the California Angels (1967–1970), Washington Senators (1970), Detroit Tigers (1971–1979), San Diego Padres (1980), New York Yankees (1980–1981), Chicago White Sox (1982–1983) and Baltimore Orioles (1983). In 1970, he led all major league players (at all positions) with 30 total zone runs. He also led the majors in fielding percentage by a third baseman in both 1976 and 1978. In 1976, he finally received the Gold Glove Award, breaking Brooks Robinson's 16-year lock on the honor.

After his playing career ended, Rodriguez worked as a manager, primarily in the Mexican League, from 1987 to 1997. He led the Sultanes de Monterrey to the 1991 Mexican League championship. In 1995, he was inducted into the Mexican Professional Baseball Hall of Fame. He died in 2000 at age 52 when he was struck by a motorist in southwest Detroit.

== Early years ==
Rodriguez was born in 1947 in Cananea, Sonora, Mexico. He was part of a family with four sons and two daughters. His father, Aurelio Rodriguez Sr. played baseball in the Mexican League and was a member of the Mexican team that played in the 1953 Amateur World Series. Rodriguez learned to play baseball from his father, who told him that if he could field on the stone-covered diamonds of Cananea, he could field anywhere. His brother Francisco "Chico" also played baseball and spent 20 seasons playing in the Mexican League.

Rodriguez began playing professional baseball in Mexico at age 16. In 1965, he played in the Mexican League junior league for the Mineros de Fresnero and at the end of the season was promoted to the Charros de Jalisco. In 1966, he played 135 games at shortstop for Jalisco and compiled a .302 batting average with 15 triples and 54 RBIs. He was selected as the Mexican League's 1966 Rookie of the Year.

== Professional baseball ==
=== California Angels ===
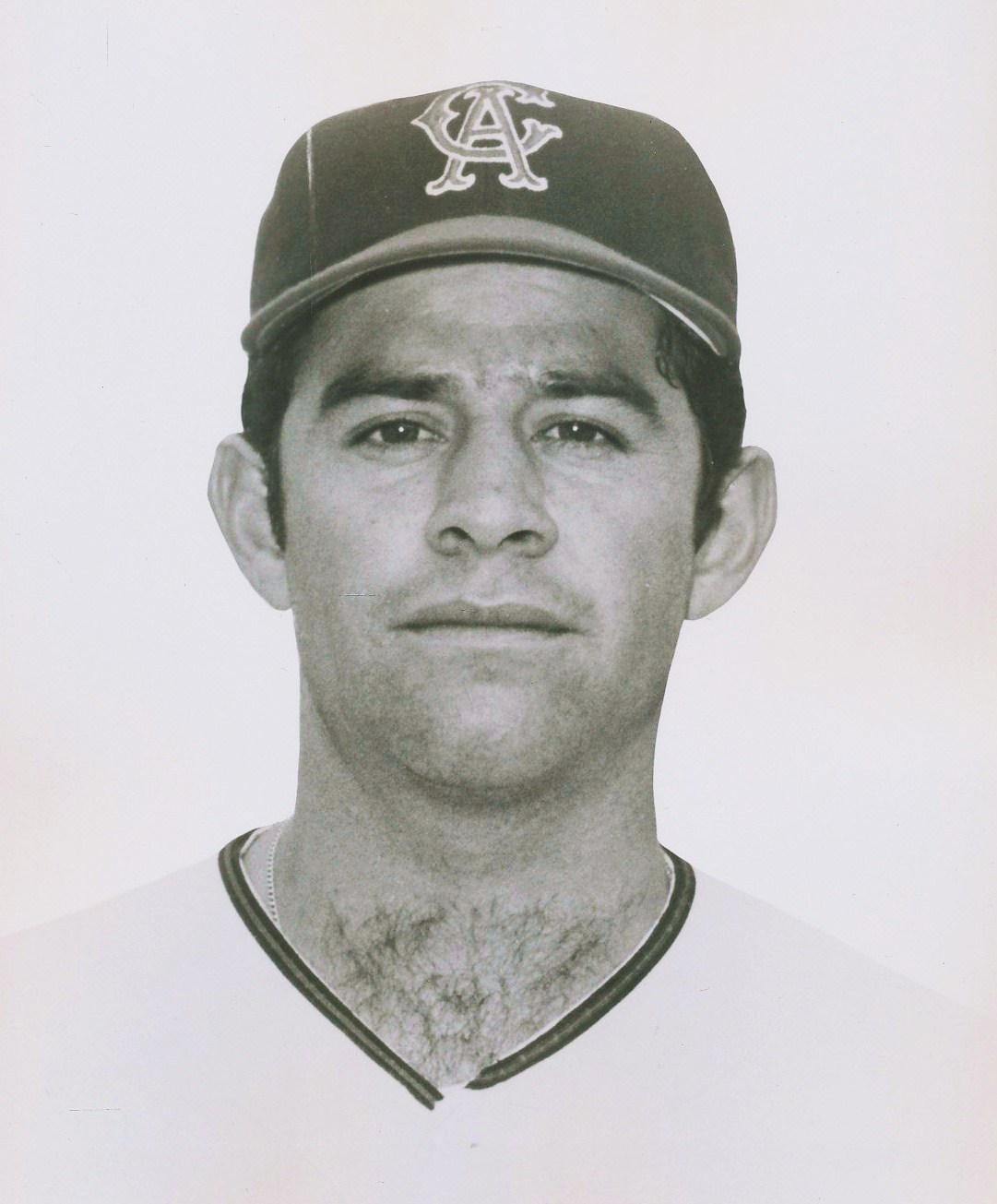
Rodríguez in 1969

In August 1966, Rodríguez signed with the California Angels. He was assigned to the Seattle Angels of the Pacific Coast League, playing at shortstop and compiling a .254 batting average in 59 at bats during the 1966 season. He moved to third base in 1967, playing most of the season for Seattle and El Paso. He hit .308 for Seattle and .327 at El Paso and had 32 doubles, nine triples, 13 home runs and 64 RBIs in 315 at bats in the minors during the 1967 season.

Rodriguez made his major league debut at the age of 19 with the Angels in September 1967. From 1967 to 1971, he appeared in 281 games for the Angels, 264 as the team's starting third baseman. While his .237 batting average was disappointing, he emerged as one of the American League's best defensive third basemen. In May 1968, Angels coach Don Heffner described Rodriguez as "the kind of player who can play anyplace" and predicted that Aurelio would be "around for a long time." Angels manager Bill Rigney boasted in March 1969: "He might be another Bobby Ávila. Aurelio Rodriguez could be the best Mexican player ever."

In 1969, Rodriguez appeared in 159 games at third base and led the league's third basemen with 42 double plays turned and ranked second behind Brooks Robinson with 352 assists. On the other hand, his batting average was only .232, and he also led the league with 24 errors at third base in 1969. The most memorable error involving Rodriguez in 1969 was his Topps baseball card; the photograph on the card was actually the Angels' batboy, Leonard Garcia.

When Rodriguez first signed with the Angels, he spoke no English: "When I came up in '66, I didn't speak English one word. I ate ham and eggs the first 10 days. I go to a restaurant and the lady would ask me what I want. I say ham and eggs . . . breakfast, dinner and supper for 10 days." He recalled being pressured by the Angels' general manager Dick Walsh to learn English: "He tell me if I no learn English, he no pay me any more money. I say, 'I can't believe it'." Rodriguez eventually picked up the language by watching television and going to cowboy movies.

Rodriguez fell from favor in 1970 under the team's new manager, Lefty Phillips. In March 1970, Phillips said: "We have tried everything to get Aurelio to choke up on the bat and to spray the ball instead of trying to pull for power but he won't listen or try to correct himself. He just smiles at you, says 'Si, amigo' and then goes back to his old swing. It's very frustrating."

=== Washington Senators ===
On April 26, 1970, the Angels traded Rodriguez with Rick Reichardt to the Washington Senators in exchange for power-hitting third baseman Ken McMullen. Washington manager Ted Williams said at the time that he hand-picked Reichardt and Rodriguez as players he would like to work with. Rodriguez appeared in 142 games for the Senators in 1970, including 137 games as the team's starting third baseman. Under Williams' tutelage in 1970, Rodriguez's batting average increased modestly to .247, and he posted career highs with 19 home runs, 83 RBIs, 70 runs scored, and 15 stolen bases. Rodriguez later touted the lessons he learned from Williams: "He help me a lot. When I play for California I swing at too many bad balls. Not with Washington. Ted Williams, all the time, he say to me 'no swing at bad balls ... always look, look ... wait ... wait ... I no forget what he tell me. Never."

Rodriguez's 19 home runs in 1970 was the most ever by a Mexican player in the major leagues—surpassing Bobby Ávila's mark of 15 home runs in 1954. On breaking Ávila's record, Rodriguez noted that Ávila had been "a big hero" for Rodriguez while growing up.

During the 1970 season, Rodriguez also established himself as having a solid claim to being the most dominant defensive third baseman in the game. He appeared in 153 combined games at the position (both for the Angels and Senators) and led all major league third basemen in both assists (377) and double plays turned (41). He also reduced his error count to 18 and ranked fourth among all basemen with a .965 fielding percentage—two one-hundredths behind major league leader Graig Nettles. His 30 total zone runs (a defensive metric utilizing play-by-play data) ranked as the highest in the major leagues at any position—eight zone runs higher than Nettles. Despite Rodriguez's impressive defensive showing, Brooks Robinson maintained a lock on the Gold Glove Award—receiving the award for 16 consecutive seasons from 1960 to 1975.

=== Detroit Tigers ===
On October 9, 1970, Rodriguez was part of a blockbuster trade that sent four Washington players (Rodriguez, Ed Brinkman, Joe Coleman, and Jim Hannan) to the Detroit Tigers in exchange for Denny McLain and three other players. Rodriguez was considered "the prize of the deal", a third baseman with "quick reflexes, a fast glove and superb throwing arm."

At Detroit's 1971 spring training, Rodriguez quickly earned a reputation for his smiling and happy disposition. Detroit public relations director Hal Middlesworth called him "the most pleasant guy I've ever seen. Always smiling and always laughing." The team's doctor in 1975 declared Rodriguez one of the most perfectly adjusted people he had ever met, adding, "He is a completely happy person."

In his first season in Detroit, Rodriguez's batting average improved to .253 (the highest of his major league career to that time), and he led the Tigers in hits (153), doubles (30), and triples (seven). He also continued to hit for power with 15 home runs. However, he played most of the year with an injured elbow, and his defensive performance dropped off as he ranked second among the American League's third basemen with 23 errors.

In the off-season between the 1971 and 1972 seasons, Rodriguez was married, played only 37 games in the Mexican Pacific Coast League, and reported healthy and fresh to spring training. During the 1972 season, Rodriguez's batting average dipped to .236, but he had perhaps his finest defensive season and helped lead the Tigers to the American League East championship. He reduced his error count to 16 and ranked first or second among the league's third basemen in virtually every defensive category: 153 games played (first); 150 putouts (first); 348 assists (first); 3.36 range factor per nine innings (first); 33 double plays turned (second); and 12 total zone runs (second). Brooks Robinson himself reportedly called Rodriguez his equal at third base, praise that he never paid to another player. Rodriguez modestly insisted that Robinson was the best.

In 1973, Rodriguez continued to struggle at the plate, as his batting average fell to .222 with nine home runs. He did, however, lead the Tigers with 27 doubles and 58 RBIs. On defense, he led the league with 160 games at the third base and a .971 fielding percentage (technically .00002 behind with Don Money) and ranked among the league's premier players at the position with 135 putouts (second), 30 double plays turned (fourth), and 335 assists (fifth).

Rodriguez began the 1974 season saying he was committed to forgetting about home runs and spraying the ball to right and center fields. He hit fewer home runs (five) than any prior full season in his career, but he nevertheless compiled an identical .222 batting average for the second consecutive year. On defense, he led the league in games played at third base (159) for the third consecutive year, and he ranked among the leading third basemen with 389 assists (second), 132 putouts (second), 40 double plays turned (third), 21 errors (third), and a 3.37 range factor per nine innings (fourth).

Rodriguez began the 1975 season saying he was no longer listening to people telling him to spray the ball to right field. He recalled the advice of his old manager: "Ted Williams did not tell me to hit the ball to right or to center or to left. He just said hit it hard and not worry about it." Rodriguez's more relaxed approach led to a modest improvement in his batting average to .245, and he led the team with 20 doubles and six triples. On June 19, 1975, Rodriguez hit his first career grand slam against the Kansas City Royals.

In 1976, Rodriguez appeared in the Tigers' first 128 games, but missed the remainder of the season after sustaining an ankle injury sliding into second base on August 29. In the 128 games he played, Rodriguez hit .240 with eight home runs and 50 RBIs. He led all major league third basemen with a .978 fielding percentage (nine errors in 409 chances) and received his first and only Gold Glove Award—the first American League third baseman since Red Sox Third Baseman Frank Malzone in 1959 to beat out Brooks Robinson. He also ranked second behind Graig Nettles in range factor per nine innings at third base.

Injuries continued to slow Rodriguez in 1977. He injured the same ankle sliding into home plate on April 26 and missed five weeks. Even after returning from the injury, Rodriguez shared the third base position with Phil Mankowski—Rodgriguez started 83 games and Mankowski 78. Rodriguez was unhappy with his new part-time role: "I'm not used to sitting on the bench, watching all nine innings. I finally got the Golden Glove last year, and now I'm not playing. I feel bad about it" Rodriguez was then slowed further when he slipped in a bathtub on July 2 and sustained a hairline rib fracture below his right arm.

In 1978, Rodriguez appeared in 131 games at third base, but only 86 as the starter, as he continued to share the third base position with Phil Mankowski. Despite the limited playing time, Rodriguez had the highest full-season batting average of his major league career at .265. He also led the major leagues with a .987 fielding percentage at third base, making only four errors during the entire season.

Rodriguez played his final season for the Tigers in 1979. He appeared in 106 games, 97 as the team's starting third baseman, and hit .254 with five home runs and 36 RBIs. He no longer ranked among the league's leading third basemen in any defensive category.

During the 1970s, Rodriguez had more hits (1,040) than any other Detroit player. He also ranked second in runs (417) and RBIs (423).

In late October 1979, the Tigers acquired third baseman Richie Hebner. Rodriguez, never one to complain previously, could see the writing on the wall, criticized Hebner's defensive abilities, and said publicly that he felt he was being treated unfairly after nine years with the Tigers. On December 7, the same day Rodriguez's criticism was published, the Tigers traded him to the San Diego Padres in exchange for a player to be named later.

=== 1980–1983 ===
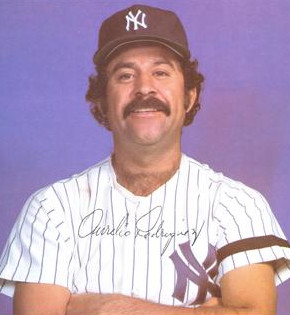
Aurelio Rodriguez - New York Yankees - 1981

Rodriguez appeared in 89 games for the Padres in 1980, 57 as the team's starting third baseman. His batting average dropped precipitously to .200 in his first season in the National League.

On August 4, 1980, with Graig Nettles out with hepatitis, the New York Yankees purchased Rodriguez from the Padres. Rodriguez appeared in 52 games for the 1980 Yankees, 43 as the starting third baseman. In 1981, Rodriguez remained with the Yankees as a backup to Nettles and started only 11 games. He compiled a .346 batting average in 52 at bats. In the 1981 World Series, he became a starter after Graig Nettles was injured in Game 2 and hit .417 (5-for-12).

Rodriguez was traded twice in the off-season between the 1981 and 1982 seasons. He was first traded by the Yankees in November to the Toronto Blue Jays for a player to be named later. He was then traded by Toronto in early April to the Chicago White Sox in exchange for outfielder Wayne Nordhagen. While initially expecting to be a backup in Chicago, the Sox traded Jim Morrison to Oakland in mid-June, and Rodriguez became the team's regular third baseman. Rodriguez appeared in 118 games for the White Sox in 1982, including 87 starts at third base. While batting only .241, Rodriguez put in a solid year defensively, finishing third among the league's third basemen with a .969 fielding percentage and a 3.38 range factor per nine innings at third base.

In February 1983, Rodriguez signed with the Baltimore Orioles as a free agent. He appeared in 45 games for the Orioles but only 18 as the starting third baseman. His batting average dropped precipitously to .119 in 67 at bats with Baltimore. He was released by Orioles in August.

Three weeks after being released by Baltimore, Rodriguez signed for a second run with the White Sox. He started only six games for Chicago in 1983 and compiled a .200 batting average in 20 at bats. He played in his final major league game on October 1, 1983 at age 35.

In the spring of 1984, Rodriguez's efforts to return to the White Sox, or to sign with another major league club, were unsuccessful.

=== Career statistics and legacy ===
In 17 major league seasons, Rodríguez was a .237 hitter with 124 home runs and 648 RBIs in 2,017 games. It was on defense that he left his mark. His career range factor of 3.215 per nine innings at third base ranks second in major league history, trailing only Darrell Evans. And his career tally 4,150 assists at third base ranked fifth in major league history at the time of his retirement.

Rodriguez is best remembered for his powerful throwing arm. Praise for his ability includes:

- Sparky Anderson was Rodriguez's manager in 1979, his last year in Detroit. "He probably had as good a pair of hands on him as anybody, and a great arm -- the only two arms I've ever seen like that, Travis Fryman and him. This guy was a great third baseman", Anderson said. WJR broadcaster Paul Carey, who during Aurelio's tenure with the Tigers was the radio partner of Hall of Famer Ernie Harwell, used to refer to Rodriguez' arm as a howitzer.
- In an appearance on the YES Network by several great third basemen, George Brett once commented on Rodríguez's arm, saying to all (but particularly to the Philadelphia Phillies great Mike Schmidt), "You remember that guy? He would toy with you and pound the ball in his glove and you were still out by 10 feet!"
- Every time the Tigers played the Yankees, the late Yankee broadcaster Phil "Scooter" Rizzuto eventually got a chance to see Rodriguez throw a "rising" fastball across the infield. "There's that arm", Scooter used to say. "If I had an arm like that...!"

=== Baseball coach and manager ===
After his playing career ended, Rodriguez worked as a manager, primarily in the Mexican League, from 1987 to 1997. He began by managing the Los Mochis club in 1987. Rodriguez returned to the United States in 1989 as assistant coach for the Colorado Springs Sky Sox, a Triple-A farm team for the Cleveland Indians. In 1990, he worked for the Toledo Mud Hens. In 1991, Rodriguez was the manager of the Sultanes de Monterrey and led the club to the Mexican League championship. He then managed the Saraperos de Saltillo in 1992 and the Industriales de Monterrey in 1993 and 1994. In 1995, Rodriguez was the manager of the Broncos de Reynosa of the Mexican League. He led Reynosa to the North Zone title in 1995. Rodriguez was suspended for the remainder of the 1996 season following an altercation in which he allegedly struck or bumped an umpire in May 1996. Rodriguez returned as manager at Reynosa in 1997, but was replaced after the 1997 season.

== Personal life and death ==
Rodriguez developed a reputation as a ladies' man. When asked in 1969 if he preferred American or Mexican girls, he smiled and replied that "as long as they wear skirts he likes them all." A woman wrote in 1973 that Rodriguez had a "charm that attracts large numbers of woman fans. His handsome looks and disposition make the girls swoon."

Rodriguez was married in December 1971. He and his wife had a son, Aurelio, in approximately 1974.

In September 2000, Rodriguez was killed on a Saturday afternoon while visiting Detroit. As he left the El Rancho restaurant, he was struck by the driver of a vehicle that jumped the curb at the corner of Cavalry and West Vernor. Rodriguez was thrown into the air and then pinned under another car. He was extricated and transported to Henry Ford Hospital, where he was pronounced dead.

Rodriguez's funeral was held at a packed stadium in Los Mochis, Sinaloa, Mexico. His tomb is located at Panteon Municipal de Los Mochis.

The driver of the car that struck Rodriguez was charged with three felony counts.
