= 1966 Baseball Hall of Fame balloting =

Elections to the Baseball Hall of Fame

National Baseball

Hall of Fame and Museum
- New inductees: 2
- via BBWAA: 1
- via Veterans Committee: 1
- Total inductees: 104
- Induction date: July 25, 1966

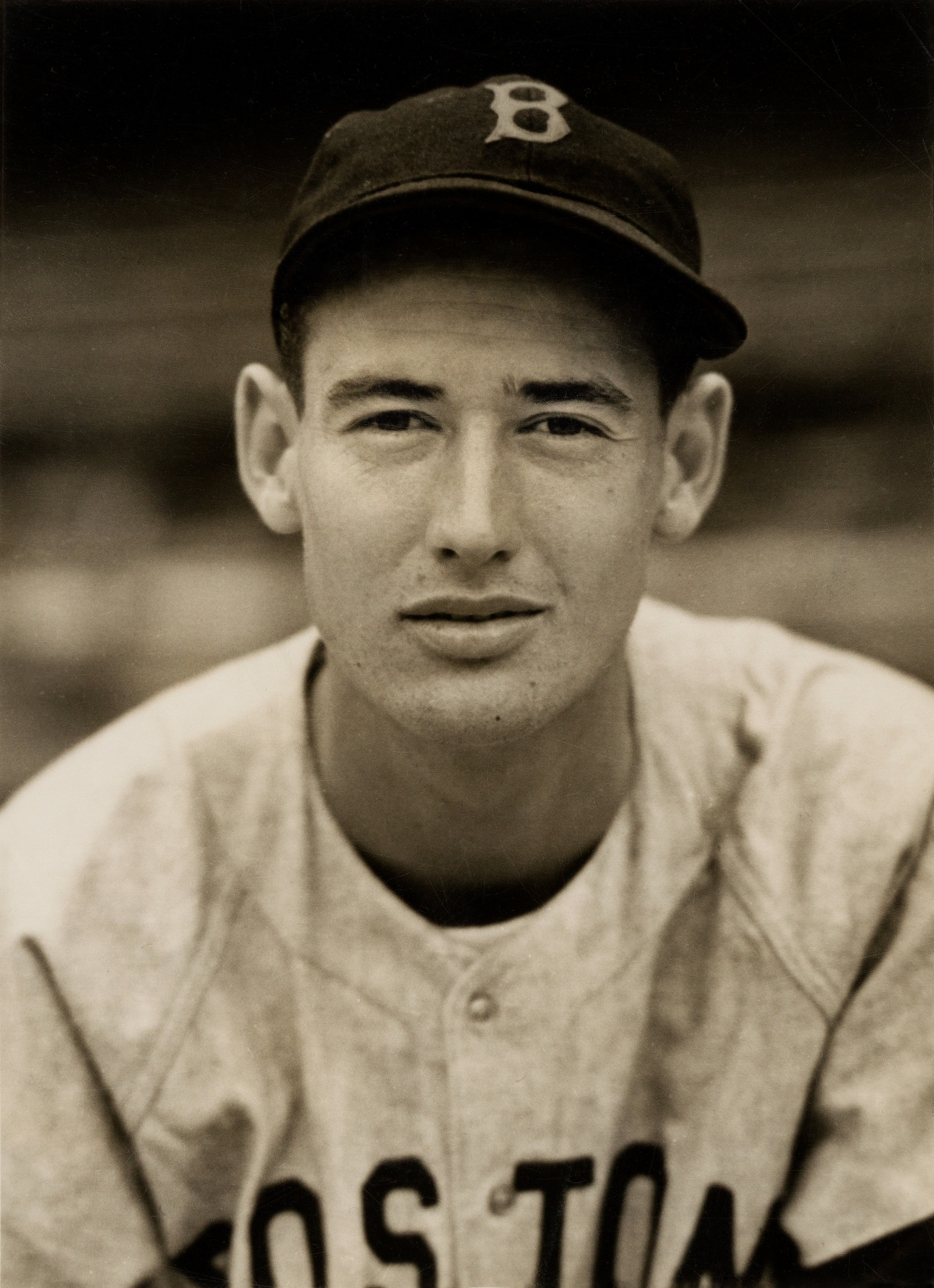
1966 BBWAA inductee Ted Williams

Elections to the Baseball Hall of Fame for 1966 followed the system introduced for even-number years in 1956. The Baseball Writers' Association of America (BBWAA) voted by mail to select from recent major league players with provision for a second, "runoff" election in case of no winner. Ted Williams tallied more than 90% on the first ballot. Meanwhile, the Veterans Committee was meeting annually to consider executives, managers, umpires, and earlier major league players. It selected Casey Stengel. A formal induction ceremony was held in Cooperstown, New York, on July 25, 1966, with Commissioner of Baseball William Eckert presiding. During his acceptance speech, Williams advocated for the inclusion of Negro league baseball players, such as Satchel Paige and Josh Gibson, in the Hall of Fame. Paige was inducted in 1971, and Gibson in 1972.

== BBWAA election ==
The BBWAA was authorized to elect players active in 1946 or later, but not after 1960. All 10-year members of the BBWAA were eligible to vote.

Voters were instructed to cast votes for up to 10 candidates; any candidate receiving votes on at least 75% of the ballots would be honored with induction to the Hall. A total of 49 players received votes; 302 ballots were cast, with 227 votes required for election. A total of 2,210 individual votes were cast, an average of 7.32 per ballot.

Candidates who were eligible for the first time are indicated here with a dagger (†). Results of the 1966 election by the BBWAA were announced on January 20. The one candidate who received at least 75% of the vote and was elected is indicated in bold italics; candidates who have since been elected in subsequent elections are indicated in italics. Al López was later elected as a manager.

Ted Williams was elected with 93.4% of the vote. Williams won the Triple Crown twice and was the last player to hit .400 in a season (.406 in 1941). He famously used his Hall induction speech to advocate for elections of Negro league players.

Tommy Bridges was eligible for the final time.

Player	Votes	Percent	Change
**Ted Williams**†	282	93.4	-
Red Ruffing	208	68.9	▼1.2%
Roy Campanella	197	65.2	▲8.0%
Joe Medwick	187	61.9	▲8.2%
Lou Boudreau	115	38.1	▲4.3%
Al López	109	36.1	▲7.7%
Enos Slaughter†	100	33.1	-
Pee Wee Reese	95	31.5	▼4.8%
Marty Marion	86	28.5	▲3.6%
Johnny Mize	81	26.8	▼0.1%
Ralph Kiner	74	24.5	▲9.1%
Johnny Vander Meer	72	23.8	▼1.6%
Allie Reynolds	60	19.9	▲2.5%
Bucky Walters	56	18.5	▲1.1%
Phil Rizzuto	54	17.9	▼4.5%
Arky Vaughan	36	11.9	▲3.4%
Mel Harder	34	11.3	▼14.1%
Ernie Lombardi	34	11.3	▼5.1%
Hal Newhouser	32	10.6	▼2.3%
Joe Gordon	31	10.3	▼4.6%
Bobby Doerr	30	9.9	▼2.0%
George Kell	29	9.6	▼6.8%
Billy Herman	28	9.3	▼3.6%
Bobo Newsom	25	8.3	▼0.2%
Bob Lemon	21	7.0	▼4.9%
Mickey Vernon†	20	6.6	-
Alvin Dark†	17	5.6	-
Tommy Bridges	16	5.3	▼2.2%
Bobby Thomson†	12	4.0	-
Phil Cavarretta	9	3.0	▼7.9%
Larry Doby†	7	2.3	-
Don Newcombe†	7	2.3	-
Carl Erskine†	6	2.0	-
Jim Hegan†	5	1.7	-
Gil McDougald†	5	1.7	-
Grady Hatton†	4	1.3	-
Whitey Lockman†	4	1.3	-
Hank Sauer†	4	1.3	-
Del Ennis†	3	1.0	-
Carl Furillo†	2	0.7	-
Marv Grissom†	2	0.7	-
Andy Pafko†	2	0.7	-
Morrie Martin†	2	0.7	-
Del Rice†	2	0.7	-
Bobby Adams†	1	0.3	-
Chico Carrasquel†	1	0.3	-
Jim Hearn†	1	0.3	-
Solly Hemus†	1	0.3	-
Bob Porterfield†	1	0.3	-

Key to colors
Elected to the Hall. These individuals are also indicated in **bold italics**.
Players who were elected in future elections. These individuals are also indicated in plain italics.

== J. G. Taylor Spink Award ==
Charles Dryden (1860–1930) received the J. G. Taylor Spink Award honoring a baseball writer. The award was voted at the December 1965 meeting of the BBWAA, and included in the summer 1966 ceremonies.
