= The Teammates (statue) =

Public artwork in Boston, Massachusetts

- Artist: Antonio Tobias Mendez
- Completion date: Dedicated June 9, 2010; 16 years ago
- Type: Bronze statues on granite plinth
- Dimensions: Plinth: 10 feet (3.0 m) wide by 5 feet (1.5 m) deep by 3 feet (0.91 m) tall; Statues: 7 feet 0 inches (2.13 m) to 7 feet 6 inches (2.29 m)
- Weight: Plinth: 15 tons; Statues: 500 to 600 pounds (230 to 270 kg) each
- Location: Fenway Park (Gate B), Boston, Massachusetts, U.S.; 42.3461°N 71.0957°W

The Teammates: A Portrait of a Friendship is an artwork in Boston, Massachusetts, which stands outside Fenway Park's Gate B, at the corner of Ipswich street and Van Ness Street. It consists of four bronze sculptures by Antonio Tobias Mendez atop a granite plinth.

== Description ==
The sculptures depict Boston Red Sox teammates (from left to right): Ted Williams, Bobby Doerr, Johnny Pesky, and Dom DiMaggio. The statue was erected in honor of not only their time together as teammates—they were teammates for seven seasons (Note: Williams played for the Red Sox during 1939–1942 and 1946–1960 (19 seasons); Doerr 1937–1944 and 1946–1951 (14 seasons); DiMaggio 1940–1942 and 1946–1953 (11 seasons); Pesky 1942 and 1946–1952 (8 seasons)—the seven seasons they played together were 1942 and 1946–1951.)—and also the friendship formed between them long after they all retired.

The statue itself features the four players in Red Sox uniforms and carrying bats over their shoulders. Each statue (independent of the plinth) is 120% of the height of each actual player: Williams, the tallest, stood 6 feet 3 inches (1.91 m) and his statue stands 7 feet 6 inches (2.29 m). The figures each weigh 500 to 600 pounds (230 to 270 kg). The plinth, which weighs around 15 tons, is made of grey granite from Deer Isle, Maine, and measures 10 feet (3.0 m) wide by 5 feet (1.5 m) deep by 3 feet (0.91 m) tall. It is inscribed with the word "TEAMMATES". A plaque attached to the right side of the plinth identifies each player, their position, their hometown, and when they came to Boston. (Note: Doerr, a second baseman, arrived from Los Angeles in 1937; Williams, a left fielder, arrived from San Diego in 1939; DiMaggio, a center fielder, arrived from San Francisco in 1940; Peksy, a shortstop, arrived from Portland, Oregon, in 1942.) It also notes their total number of years with the Red Sox (52), number of years served in the military during World War II (11), (Note: DiMaggio served from October 1942 to January 1946 (3 years, 3 months); Williams served from November 1942 to January 1946 (3 years, 2 months); Pesky served from November 1942 to December 1945 (3 years, 1 month); Doerr served from September 1944 to December 1945 (1 year, 3 months)—totaling 10 years, 9 months.) and number of All-Star Game selections (36). (Note: Williams was an All-Star selection 19 times, Doerr 9 times, DiMaggio 7 times, and Pesky once.)

== Dedication ==
The unveiling of the artwork, on June 9, 2010, was attended by Doerr and Pesky, along with Emily DiMaggio, the widow of Dom DiMaggio. Williams had died in July 2002 and DiMaggio in May 2009. Pesky subsequently died in August 2012 and Doerr in November 2017. Red Sox principal owner John W. Henry, chairman Tom Werner, and president Larry Lucchino also attended the dedication, as did Dick Flavin, the "poet laureate of the Boston Red Sox."
