= Johnny Pesky =

American baseball player, coach, and manager (1919–2012)

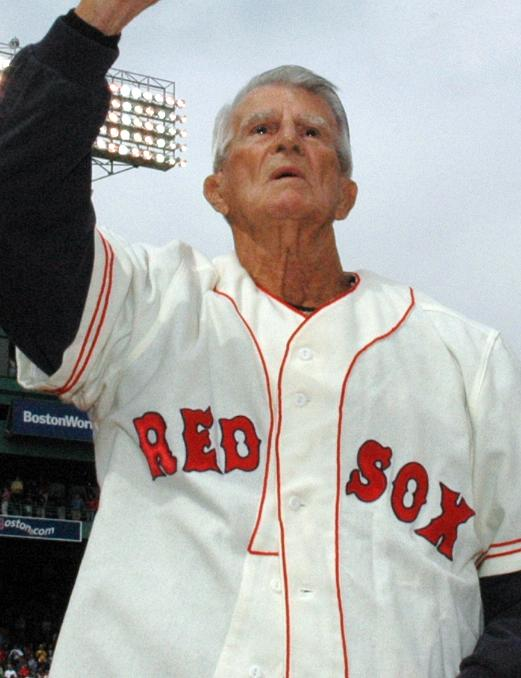
- Pesky in 2006
- Shortstop / Third baseman / Manager
- Born: February 27, 1919; Portland, Oregon, U.S.
- Died: August 13, 2012 (aged 93); Danvers, Massachusetts, U.S.
- Batted: Left Threw: Right

MLB debut
- April 14, 1942, for the Boston Red Sox

Last MLB appearance
- September 24, 1954, for the Washington Senators

MLB statistics
- Batting average: .307
- Home runs: 17
- Runs batted in: 404
- Managerial record: 147–179
- Winning %: .451
- Stats at Baseball Reference
- Managerial record at Baseball Reference

Teams
- As player: Boston Red Sox (1942, 1946–1952); Detroit Tigers (1952–1954); Washington Senators (1954); As manager: Boston Red Sox (1963–1964, 1980); As coach: Pittsburgh Pirates (1965–1967); Boston Red Sox (1975–1979, 1980–1984)

Career highlights and awards
- All-Star (1946); Boston Red Sox No. 6 retired; Boston Red Sox Hall of Fame

John Michael Pesky (born John Michael Paveskovich; February 27, 1919 – August 13, 2012), nicknamed "the Needle" and "Mr. Red Sox", was an American professional baseball player, manager and coach in Major League Baseball (MLB). He was a shortstop and third baseman during a ten-year major league playing career, appearing in 1,270 games played in 1942 and from 1946 to 1954 for three teams. He missed the 1943–45 seasons while serving in World War II. Pesky was associated with the Boston Red Sox for 61 of his 73 years in baseball—from 1940 through June 3, 1952, 1961 through 1964, and from 1969 until his death. Pesky also managed the Red Sox from 1963 to 1964, and in September 1980.

A left-handed hitter who threw right-handed, Pesky was a tough man for pitchers to strike out. He was the first American League (AL) player to score 6 runs in a 9 inning game. As a hitter, he specialized in getting on base, leading the AL in base hits three times—his first three seasons in the majors, in which he collected over 200 hits each year—and was among the top ten in on-base percentage six times while batting .307 in 4,745 at bats as a major leaguer. He was also an excellent bunter who led the league in sacrifice hits in 1942. He was a teammate and close friend of Ted Williams, Bobby Doerr and Dom DiMaggio and the four were later honored with The Teammates statue outside Fenway Park.

== Early life ==
Pesky was born February 27, 1919, in Portland, Oregon, the son of Croat immigrants Jakov and Marija (Bajama) Paveskovich. (Major League Baseball has his date of birth as September 27, 1919, an adjustment made by Pesky in 1939 to meet baseball minimum scouting age for tryouts.)

== Playing career ==
=== Amateur and minor leagues ===
Pesky played for Lincoln High School, and attended a baseball school run by former major league pitcher Carl Mays. He spent several years playing for local amateur teams, such as the Portland Babes, Bend Elks and Silverton Red Sox. The third of these teams was associated with the Silver Falls Timber Company, which was owned by Tom Yawkey, who also owned the major league Red Sox. A skilled ice hockey player, he once worked out with the Boston Bruins.

His name was shortened to "Pesky" early in his playing career. According to one story, Portland sportswriters would abbreviate his name to "Pesky" because it fit better in a box score. Another version has it that an Oregonian sports editor asked about a certain pesky hitter he'd watched play, seemingly unaware of the similarity to the player's actual surname. Whatever the case, the young ballplayer changed his name legally from Paveskovich to Pesky in 1947.

Pesky was signed as an amateur free agent by the Red Sox before the 1940 season and spent the next two seasons in the minor leagues. In 1940, he played for the Rocky Mount Red Sox of the Piedmont League, where he was a teammate of future Hall of Famer Heinie Manush, who was the team's player-manager. After hitting .325 with Rocky Mount, he moved up to the double-A Louisville Colonels, where he also batted .325. The next year, he was in the major leagues.

=== Major leagues ===
During his rookie year in 1942, Pesky led the AL in hits with 205—at the time a Red Sox record for a rookie—as well as sacrifice hits with 22. He was second only to teammate Ted Williams in average at .331, and finished third in Most Valuable Player voting behind MVP Joe Gordon and Williams.

After missing three seasons due to World War II, Pesky came back in 1946, leading the league in hits once again, batting .335, third in the league, and finishing fourth in the MVP voting while also making his first and only All-Star team. His 53 hits in August set a team record for hits in a month, a record later tied by Dom DiMaggio. In 1947, Pesky batted .324 while leading the league in hits for the third consecutive year with 207. It was also Pesky's third consecutive year having 200 or more hits each season from the start of his career which matched that of the Pittsburgh Pirates' Lloyd Waner occurring during the 1927–29 seasons.

In the 1947–48 offseason, the Red Sox acquired shortstop Vern Stephens, a three-time All-Star, and asked Pesky to move to third base. The switch took a toll on Pesky, who had his worst season to date as a hitter, as his average dropped to .281. He bounced back to hit over .300 each year from 1949 to 1951, and in 1951 he and Stephens swapped positions, with Pesky returning to shortstop and Stephens moving to third base.

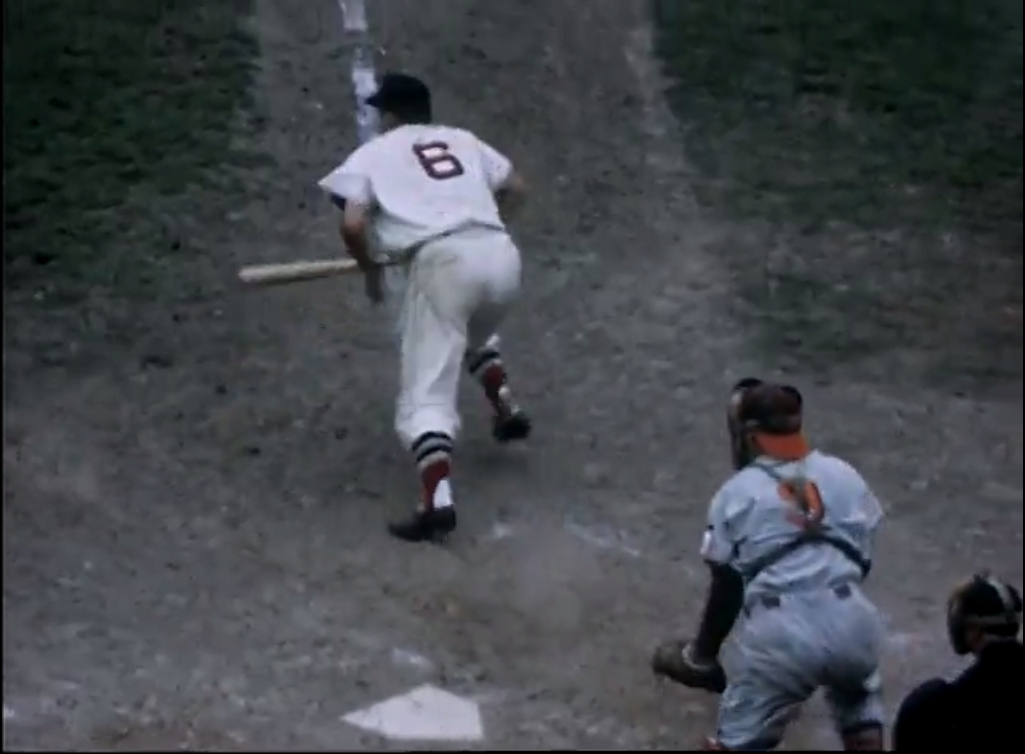
Pesky (wearing number 6) runs after hitting a drag bunt, from an early 1950s film.

Pesky began the 1952 season slowly, and by mid-June he had played in just 25 games, batting .149. He was traded to the Detroit Tigers in a nine-player deal, in which the Red Sox also traded Walt Dropo, Fred Hatfield, Don Lenhardt, and Bill Wight and acquired Hoot Evers, George Kell, Johnny Lipon, and Dizzy Trout. Tigers' manager Fred Hutchinson had Pesky mentor Al Kaline. On the field, Pesky split time at shortstop with Neil Berry, batting .254 in 69 games with the Tigers. In 1953, the Tigers moved Pesky to second base, and his batting average rebounded somewhat to .292. However, in 1954, the Tigers installed rookie Frank Bolling at second base, and Pesky was demoted to the bench. He was traded in mid-season to the Washington Senators for Mel Hoderlein. After finishing the season batting just .246 overall, he was released.

=== Back to the minor leagues ===
Pesky was signed by the Baltimore Orioles on December 16, 1954, but was released four months later on April 10, 1955. He signed with the New York Yankees, where he was assigned to their top farm club, the Denver Bears as a player-coach. He played 17 games in the Carolina League with the Durham Bulls franchise in 1956.

=== "Pesky's Pole" ===
In honor of Pesky, the right field foul pole at Fenway Park, home of the Red Sox, is known as Pesky's Pole, or the Pesky Pole. Former teammate and Sox broadcaster Mel Parnell named the pole after Pesky. The story goes that Pesky won a game for Parnell in 1948 with a home run down the short (302 feet (92 m)) right field line, just around the pole. Being that Pesky was a contact hitter who hit only 17 home runs—six of them at Fenway Park—in 4,745 at bats in the major leagues, it's quite possible that the home runs he hit there landed in close proximity to the pole. Research, however, shows that Pesky hit just one home run in a game pitched by Parnell, a two-run shot in the first inning of a game against Detroit played on June 11, 1950. The game was eventually won by the visiting Tigers in the 14th inning on a three-run shot by Tigers right fielder Vic Wertz and Parnell earned a no-decision that day.

== Minor and Major League manager ==
Pesky began his coaching career in the New York Yankees organization with the 1955 Denver Bears of the Triple-A American Association working under manager Ralph Houk. From 1956 through 1960, Pesky was a manager in the Detroit farm system, reaching the Double-A level with the Birmingham Barons and the Victoria Rosebuds. He also managed a team in the Nicaraguan Professional Baseball League during the 1959–60 season.

He then rejoined the Red Sox in 1961 as manager of their Triple-A farm club, the Seattle Rainiers of the Pacific Coast League.

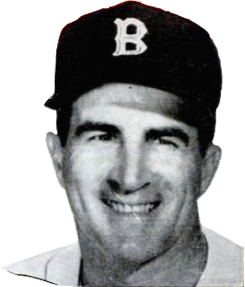
Pesky in 1963

=== Two-year term as Red Sox manager ===
Pesky enjoyed two winning seasons in Seattle. At the close of the 1962 campaign, Boston owner Tom Yawkey elevated manager Pinky Higgins to the club's vacant post of general manager and personally appointed Pesky as Higgins's replacement. Although the selection of Pesky was a popular choice, the Red Sox were a second division team and notorious as a "country club"—a group of unmotivated players who did what they wanted, when they wanted. In addition, Higgins and Pesky were not particularly close, and the general manager would be accused of undermining Yawkey's hand-picked skipper.

A major off-season trade added slugging first baseman Dick Stuart to Pesky's maiden roster, and while Stuart would lead the American League with 118 runs batted in during 1963, he was an atrocious fielder (nicknamed "Dr. Strangeglove" and "Stonefingers") who would constantly defy Pesky's authority and make it difficult for him to control his players. Pesky's 1963 club started quickly. It won 40 of its first 70 games and on June 28 stood only 1 1/2 games behind the league-leading Yankees. The team's standout performer, relief pitcher Dick Radatz (converted to the bullpen by Pesky at Seattle in 1961), had saved 12 games and won seven others with a 1.16 earned run average to keep the Red Sox in contention to that point.

But the team buckled from poor defense and, apart from Radatz and 20-game-winning starter Bill Monbouquette, lack of pitching depth; it went only 36–55 for the rest of the campaign to finish 76–85 and in seventh place in the ten-team American League. The following year, despite another strong contribution from Radatz and the debut of star 19-year-old rookie outfielder Tony Conigliaro, the 1964 Sox continued to languish in the second division, winning only 70 of the 160 games Pesky managed. With two games left in the season, he was replaced as manager by Billy Herman, the club's third-base coach and a friend of Higgins.

=== Four years with Pittsburgh Pirates ===
Pesky then left the Red Sox for four seasons, and joined the Pittsburgh Pirates organization. From 1965 through 1967, he served as first-base coach for Pirate manager Harry Walker, who had hit the double that scored Enos Slaughter with the winning run in the eighth inning of Game 7 of the 1946 World Series—the play on which Pesky was rather dubiously accused of "holding the ball" on a relay from the outfield, allegedly hesitating as Slaughter made his "mad dash" for home from first base. After Walker's firing in 1967, Pesky managed the Bucs' Triple-A farm club, the Columbus Jets of the International League, to a second-place finish in 1968.

== Return to the Red Sox ==
After the 1968 season, Pesky returned to the Red Sox organization as a color commentator on the Sox' radio and television announcing crew. A few days after he took on the job, his old friend Ted Williams, newly named manager of the Washington Senators, asked Pesky to be his bench coach and top aide. Although tempted by Williams' offer, Pesky decided to remain in Boston. He worked with Ken Coleman and Ned Martin on Boston's WHDH Radio and TV from 1969 to 1971, then strictly on television with Coleman on WBZ-TV from 1972 to 1974. He later served as analyst for selected games on radio with Joe Castiglione calling play-by-play.

In 1975, Pesky finally returned to uniform as a full-time coach under manager Darrell Johnson. As in Pittsburgh, he worked at first base and, in his first season back on the field, the Bosox won the 1975 American League East title, swept the three-time world champion Oakland Athletics in the 1975 American League Championship Series, and battled the Cincinnati Reds in a thrilling, seven-game World Series. Pesky remained first-base coach under Johnson and his successor, Don Zimmer, before moving to a bench and batting coach role for Zimmer in 1980. The Red Sox had been contenders for most of the late 1970s, but in 1980 they stumbled to fourth place in the AL East, resulting in Zimmer's dismissal with five games left in the season. Pesky took command as interim pilot, and Boston lost four of five, to finish Pesky's career managing record at 147–179 (.451).

The following season, another old friend, Ralph Houk, became Boston's manager, and Pesky resumed his role as the club's batting and bench coach. He was especially valued by Sox slugger Jim Rice, with whom Pesky worked tirelessly. Pesky missed the entire 1983 season with a serious food allergy that caused severe weight loss, but once the source of the illness was discovered, he was able to return for a final season as a full-time coach in 1984. From 1985 until his death, he served as a special instructor and assistant to the general manager, often suiting up before games to work with players. In 1990, at age 71, he also spent almost 2½ months as interim manager of Boston's top farm club, the Pawtucket Red Sox, when the team's skipper, Ed Nottle, was fired in June.

== Managerial record ==
Team	Year	Regular season					Postseason			
Team	Year	Games	Won	Lost	Win %	Finish	Won	Lost	Win %	Result
BOS	1963	161	76	85	.472	7th in AL	–	–	–	–
BOS	1964	160	70	90	.438	fired	–	–	–	–
BOS	1980	5	1	4	–	4th in AL East	–	–	–	–
Total		326	147	179	.451		0	0	–	

== Later years ==
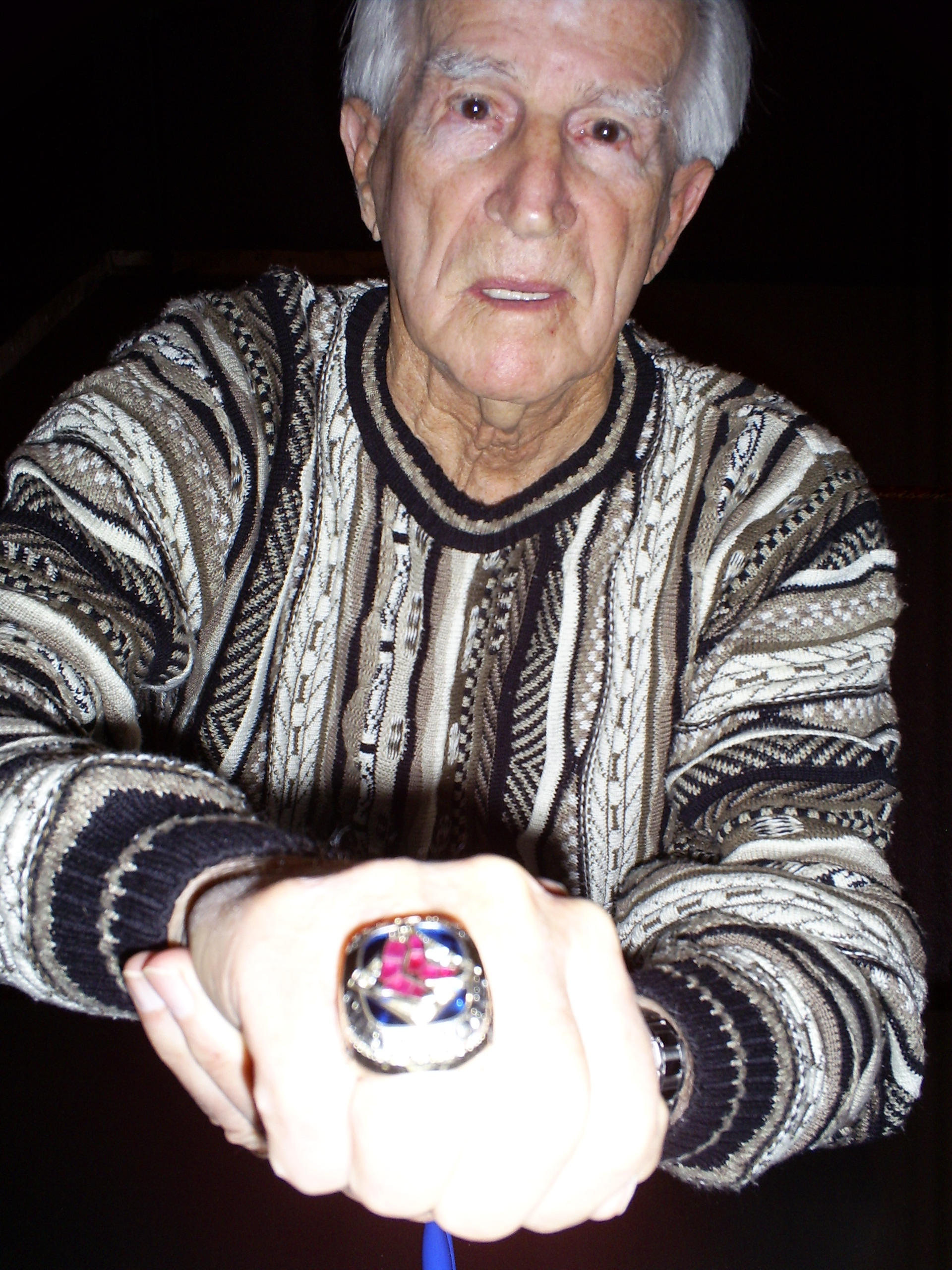
Pesky showing off his 2007 World Series ring

Intermittently, Pesky was allowed to sit on the Red Sox bench during games, but three times was prevented from doing so—once by his own general manager, Dan Duquette, a second time when the Baltimore Orioles complained to MLB, and a third time in March 2007, when Major League Baseball announced it would enforce limitations that only six coaches could be in uniform during a game. As an instructor, Pesky was ineligible. On April 3, 2007, the North Shore Spirit, a now-defunct team in the Independent Can-Am League, in Lynn, Massachusetts, invited Pesky to sit in their dugout—and serve as an honorary coach—anytime he wanted.

When the Red Sox returned to the World Series in 2004 to face the Cardinals for a third time, Pesky was officially a Special Assignment Instructor and watched the final out of Game 4, where the Red Sox sealed a sweep and their first World Series win in 86 years, from the visiting clubhouse at Busch Stadium. In the celebration that immediately followed, he was embraced by members of the Curse-breaking, title-winning Sox such as Tim Wakefield, Curt Schilling and Kevin Millar as a living representative of past Red Sox stars whose teams fell short of winning the Fall Classic, at times literally at the final hurdle. As John Powers wrote for the Boston Globe, "Pesky was the stand-in for all of the Towne Teamers who'd gotten to the World Series and fell short. For teammate Ted Williams, who wept in the clubhouse after batting .200 in 1946. For Jim Lonborg, who won two games with brilliant pitching in 1967 but was battered on two days' rest in the finale. For Carl Yastrzemski, who played on two teams that lost the Series in the seventh game. And for Bill Buckner, who had the grounder go between his legs in 1986."

He played a poignant and prominent role in the ceremony in which the World Series Championship Rings were handed out (April 11, 2005, before the Red Sox home season opener against the Yankees) – and himself was awarded the World Series ring that eluded him as a player and manager. Bill Simmons, who was present that day, wrote for ESPN in a column that was republished in Now I Can Die In Peace that Pesky received the biggest cheer as a living "reminder of everything that had happened since 1918." (As others had pointed out, not only had Pesky been the shortstop during Slaughter's Mad Dash, but he had been born within six months of the 1918 World Series, and his wife's given name was Ruth.) With the help of Carl Yastrzemski, Pesky raised the 2004 World Series Championship banner up the Fenway Park center field flagpole. After the Red Sox swept the Colorado Rockies in the 2007 World Series, Pesky again received a ring and the honor of raising the newest Red Sox championship banner on April 8, 2008.

Johnny Pesky's number 6 was retired by the Boston Red Sox in 2008.

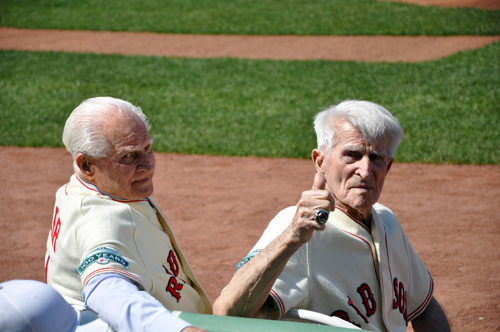
Pesky (right) and Bobby Doerr (left) at Fenway's 100th Anniversary

On his 87th birthday, September 27, 2006, the Red Sox honored Pesky by officially naming the right-field foul pole "Pesky's Pole", although it was already unofficially known as such. On September 23, 2008, the Red Sox announced they would retire the number 6 Pesky wore as a player to mark his 89th birthday and his long years of service to the club. (Pesky wore #22 as the team's manager in the 1960s, and #35 as a coach from 1975 to 1980. Although he reclaimed #6 and wore it from 1981 to 1984, between 1985 and its retirement the number also was assigned to players such as Bill Buckner, Rick Cerone, Damon Berryhill and Tony Peña.)

Pesky's was the sixth number retired by the Red Sox; his was the first to break the club's code to have a number retired: being in the Baseball Hall of Fame and spending at least ten years with the Red Sox (Pesky has not been selected for the Hall of Fame).

Pesky was a longtime resident of Boston's North Shore, living in Lynn and then Swampscott, Massachusetts. He was a visible member of the community, making personal appearances for the Red Sox. For years, he was a commercial spokesman on television and radio for a local supplier of doors and windows, JB Sash and Door Company. The commercials were deliberately and humorously corny, with Pesky and the company's owner calling themselves "the Window Boys."

On May 16, 2009, Pesky was given an honorary degree during Salem State College's 199th commencement ceremony. On April 20, 2012, Boston Red Sox fans celebrated the 100th birthday of Fenway Park, and Johnny Pesky was a participant. He was brought out to second base in a wheelchair, aside Bobby Doerr, to join over 200 past Red Sox players and coaches through the decades.

== Death ==
Pesky died on August 13, 2012, at the Kaplan Family Hospice House in Danvers, Massachusetts, at the age of 93; he was buried next to his wife Ruth, who died in 2005. Many in Boston and in Red Sox Nation mourned his passing, and John Dennis began the first edition of the Dennis & Callahan Show on WEEI-FM in Boston after his death by saying that it had felt like every New Englander's grandfather had died.

== See also ==
- Boston Red Sox Hall of Fame
- Milt Schmidt (1918–2017), Boston Bruins legend who was a longtime friend of Pesky

Sporting positions
Preceded by Dick Sisler	Seattle Rainiers manager 1961–1962	Succeeded by Mel Parnell
Preceded by Mickey Vernon	Pittsburgh Pirates first-base coach 1965–1967	Succeeded by Bill Virdon
Preceded by Harding "Pete" Peterson	Columbus Jets manager 1968	Succeeded by Don Hoak
Preceded by Eddie Popowski	Boston Red Sox first-base coach 1975–1979	Succeeded by Tommy Harper
Preceded by n/a	Boston Red Sox hitting coach 1980–1984	Succeeded by Walt Hriniak
Preceded by Ed Nottle	Pawtucket Red Sox manager June–September 1990	Succeeded by Butch Hobson
