= 1946 Major League Baseball All-Star Game =

1946 American baseball competition

	1	2	3	4	5	6	7	8	9	R	H	E
National League	0	0	0	0	0	0	0	0	0	0	3	0
American League	2	0	0	1	3	0	2	4	X	12	14	1
- Date: July 9, 1946
- Venue: Fenway Park
- City: Boston, Massachusetts
- Managers: Charlie Grimm (CHI); Steve O'Neill (DET)
- Attendance: 34,906
- Radio: Mutual
- Radio announcers: Mel Allen and Jim Britt

The 1946 Major League Baseball All-Star Game was the 13th playing of the "Midsummer Classic" by Major League Baseball's (MLB) American League (AL) and National League (NL) All-Star teams.

The All-Star Game was held on July 9, 1946 at Fenway Park in Boston, Massachusetts, the home of the AL's Boston Red Sox. The game resulted in the American League defeating the National League 12–0.

== Red Sox in the game ==
The Red Sox hosted the game and were well-represented. Red Sox infielders Bobby Doerr and Johnny Pesky, along with outfielders Ted Williams and Dom DiMaggio, were in the AL starting lineup, while pitchers Dave Ferriss and Mickey Harris along with first baseman Rudy York and catcher Hal Wagner were also named to the team (of the Red Sox' reserves, only York played in the game).

This was the game in which Ted Williams became the only player to hit a home run against the famed "Eephus pitch" of Pittsburgh Pirates hurler Rip Sewell.

== Starting lineups ==
Players in italics have since been inducted into the National Baseball Hall of Fame.

=== National League ===
- Red Schoendienst, 2b
- Stan Musial, lf
- Johnny Hopp, cf
- Dixie Walker, rf
- Whitey Kurowski, 3b
- Johnny Mize, 1b
- Walker Cooper, c
- Marty Marion, ss
- Claude Passeau, p

=== American League ===
- Dom DiMaggio, cf
- Johnny Pesky, ss
- Ted Williams, lf
- Charlie Keller, rf
- Bobby Doerr, 2b
- Mickey Vernon, 1b
- Ken Keltner, 3b
- Frankie Hayes, c
- Bob Feller, p

=== Umpires ===
Position	Umpire	League
Home Plate	Bill Summers	American
First Base	Dusty Boggess	National
Second Base	Eddie Rommel	American
Third Base	Larry Goetz	National

The umpires changed assignments in the middle of the fifth inning – Summers and Goetz swapped positions, also Boggess and Rommel swapped positions.

== Synopsis ==
Tuesday, July 9, 1946 1:30 pm (ET) at Fenway Park in Boston, Massachusetts
Team	1	2	3	4	5	6	7	8	9	R	H	E
National League	0	0	0	0	0	0	0	0	0	0	3	0
American League	2	0	0	1	3	0	2	4	X	12	14	1
WP: Bob Feller (1–0) LP: Claude Passeau (0–1) Sv: Jack Kramer (1); Home runs: NL: None; AL: Charlie Keller (1), Ted Williams (2)

The NL threatened in the top of the first inning, having two men on with one out, but were unable to score. The AL scored two runs in the bottom of the first, on a home run by Charlie Keller. There was then little activity until Ted Williams hit a home run in the bottom of the fourth, followed by the AL sending nine men to the plate in the bottom of the fifth while scoring three runs. The AL later added six more runs, with the NL never threatening.

Ted Williams still (through 2016) holds five single-game All-Star Game Records, which were set in this game: hits (4), home runs (2), runs (4), RBI (5), and total bases (10). Note that MLB did not name an All-Star Game MVP until 1962.

Because the 1945 All-Star Game was canceled, Boston Braves manager Billy Southworth, who had managed the St. Louis Cardinals in 1944, was named a coach under Charley Grimm, while Steve O'Neill named Luke Sewell of the St. Louis Browns as one of his coaches.
