= Dom DiMaggio =

American baseball player (1917–2009)

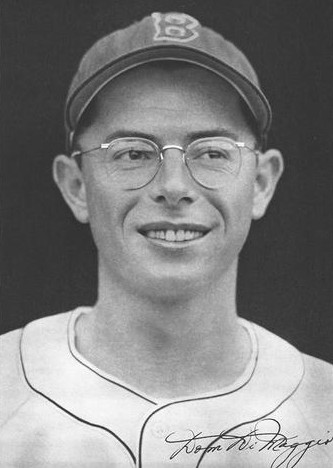
- Center fielder
- Born: February 12, 1917; San Francisco, California, U.S.
- Died: May 8, 2009 (aged 92); Marion, Massachusetts, U.S.
- Batted: Right Threw: Right

MLB debut
- April 16, 1940, for the Boston Red Sox

Last MLB appearance
- May 9, 1953, for the Boston Red Sox

MLB statistics
- Batting average: .298
- Home runs: 87
- Runs batted in: 618
- Stats at Baseball Reference

Teams
- Boston Red Sox (1940–1942, 1946–1953)

Career highlights and awards
- 7× All-Star (1941, 1942, 1946, 1949–1952); AL stolen base leader (1950); Boston Red Sox Hall of Fame

Dominic Paul DiMaggio (February 12, 1917 – May 8, 2009), nicknamed "the Little Professor", was an American Major League Baseball center fielder. He played his entire 11-year baseball career for the Boston Red Sox (1940–1953). DiMaggio was the youngest of three brothers who each became major league center fielders, the others being Joe and Vince.

== Biography ==
An effective leadoff hitter, DiMaggio batted .300 four times and led the American League in runs twice and in triples and stolen bases once each. He also led AL center fielders in assists three times and in putouts and double plays twice each; he tied a league record by recording 400 putouts four times, and his 1948 totals of 503 putouts and 526 total chances stood as AL records for nearly 30 years. DiMaggio's 1,338 games in center field ranked eighth in AL history at his retirement. His 34-game hitting streak in 1949 remains a record for the major-league Red Sox.

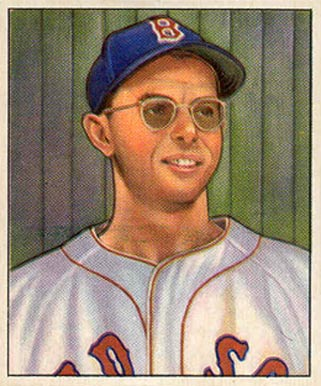
A 1950 Bowman Gum baseball card of Dom DiMaggio

DiMaggio was the youngest of three brothers who grew up in North Beach, San Francisco and who had each become major league center fielders. Joe was a star with the rival New York Yankees, and Vince played for five National League teams. The youngest of nine children born to Sicilian immigrants, Dom's small stature (5'9") and eyeglasses earned him the nickname "The Little Professor."

DiMaggio broke into the minor leagues in 1937 with the San Francisco Seals of the Pacific Coast League. For the 1939 season, DiMaggio recorded a .360 batting average. Following this season, the Boston Red Sox purchased DiMaggio's contract for $75,000. In his 1940 rookie season, he hit .301, becoming part of a .300-hitting outfield with Ted Williams and Doc Cramer. In both 1941 and 1942 he scored over 100 runs to finish third in the AL, and was among the league's top ten players in doubles and steals; he was named an All-Star both years.

After missing three years serving in the Navy in World War II, DiMaggio returned in 1946 with his best season yet, batting .316 to place fifth in the league, and coming in ninth in the MVP voting as Boston won its first pennant in 28 years. Batting third, he hit only .259 in the 1946 World Series against the St. Louis Cardinals, but was almost a Series hero for Boston. With two out in the eighth inning of Game 7, he doubled to drive in two runs, tying the score 3-3; but he pulled his hamstring coming into second base, and had to be removed for a pinch runner. The result was costly, as Harry Walker doubled to center field in the bottom of the inning, with Enos Slaughter scoring from first base in his famed "Mad Dash" to win the game and Series for St. Louis; had DiMaggio remained in the game, Walker's hit might have been catchable, or the outfielder's strong arm might have held Slaughter to third base. "If they hadn't taken DiMaggio out of the game", Slaughter later said of his daring sprint, "I wouldn't have tried it."

After a disappointing offensive year in 1947, DiMaggio rebounded in 1948 to score 127 runs (second in the AL) with career highs in doubles (40), runs batted in (87) and walks (101). His 503 putouts broke Baby Doll Jacobson's AL record of 484, set with the 1924 St. Louis Browns; his 526 total chances surpassed the league mark of 498 shared by Sam Rice of the 1920 Washington Senators and Jacobson. At the time, the marks ranked behind only Taylor Douthit's totals of 547 and 566 with the 1928 Cardinals in major league history; both records stood until 1977, when Chet Lemon of the Chicago White Sox recorded 512 putouts and 536 total chances. In 1949 DiMaggio batted .307 with 126 runs, and had his team-record 34-game hitting streak; ironically, the streak was ended on August 9 by an outstanding catch made by his brother Joe and also ironically, Vic Raschi book-ended the streak as Dom went hitless against Raschi the game before his 34-game hitting streak. That year he made 400 putouts for the fourth time, tying the AL record held by Sam West of the Senators and Browns; the mark was later tied by two other players before being broken by Lemon in 1985.

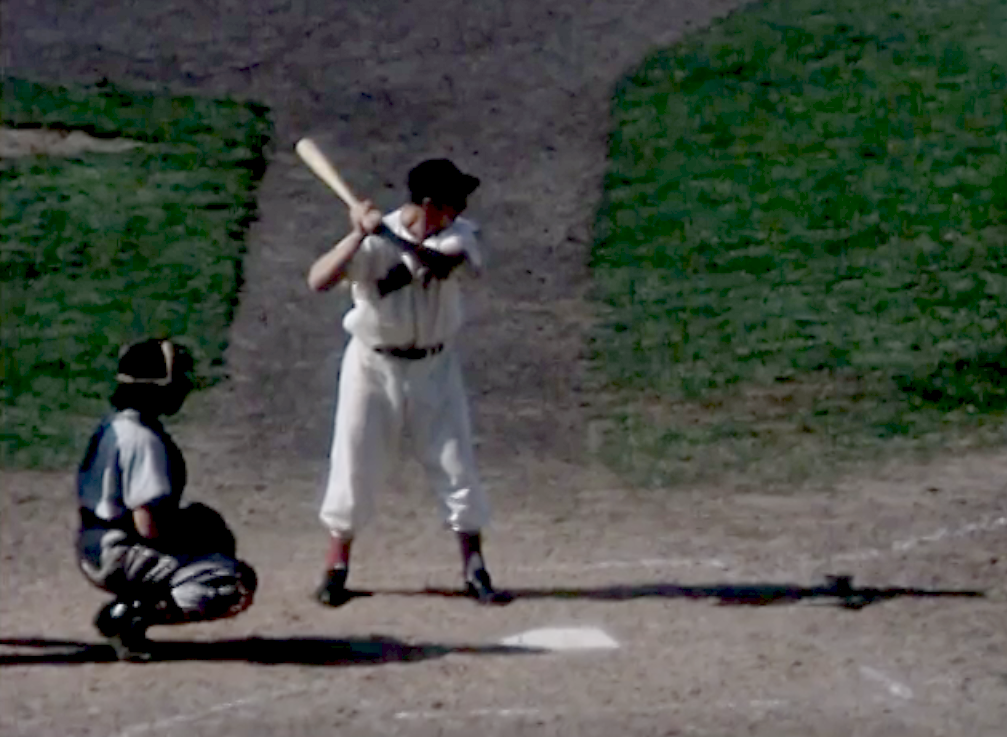
Dom at bat in the early 1950s

In 1950, DiMaggio led the AL in runs (131), triples (11) and stolen bases (15) while hitting a career-high .328. On June 30, he and Joe hit home runs while playing against one another, becoming the fourth pair of brothers to homer in the same game. Dom's stolen base total of 15 is the lowest stolen base total to lead either of the Major Leagues in a single season. In August of that year, he had 53 base hits, tying a club record with teammate Johnny Pesky.

DiMaggio again led the league in runs (113) in 1951, when he had a 27-game hitting streak from May 12 to June 7. He retired in May 1953, after appearing in only three games that year as a pinch hitter, with a .298 batting average, 1680 hits, 308 doubles, 57 triples, 87 home runs, 1046 runs and 618 RBI in 1399 games. DiMaggio was selected an All-Star seven times (1941–42, 1946, 1949–52). His career average of 2.9 chances per game remains the record for AL outfielders.

DiMaggio enjoyed a close friendship with teammates Ted Williams, Bobby Doerr, and Johnny Pesky, which was chronicled in David Halberstam's book The Teammates. The four were later honored with The Teammates statue outside Fenway Park.

After retiring, he became a plastics manufacturer in New England. He and his wife Emily, whom he married in 1948, had two sons, Paul and Peter; a daughter, Emily, and several grandchildren.

Writer David Halberstam described Dom as "probably the most underrated player of his day."

=== Life after baseball ===
After his retirement from professional baseball in 1953, DiMaggio formed the American Latex Fiber Corporation, which produced padding for items such as automobile seats and furniture. DiMaggio would eventually purchase an automotive supply firm and would merge it with American Latex Fiber Corporation to form the Delaware Valley Corporation.

In 1959, DiMaggio joined forces with nine other New Englanders, led by Billy Sullivan, to found and capitalize a Boston American football team that debuted in 1960 as the AFL's Boston Patriots. DiMaggio's tenure as an owner of the Patriots was not an easy one, his disputes with Sullivan would lead him to once attempt to oust him as president. Eventually, DiMaggio would sell his stock in the Boston Patriots in August 1966 for $500,000, earning DiMaggio a profit of $400,000 from his initial investment of $100,000.

After the death of Red Sox owner Tom Yawkey in July 1976, DiMaggio was a part of a group which included his brother Joe, Red Sox General Manager Dick O'Connell, San Francisco Mayor Joseph Alioto, and insurance magnate Bernard Baldwin, which sought to obtain ownership of the Red Sox. The attempt fell through after Tom Yawkey's widow, Jean Yawkey, chose to retain ownership.

In 1979, DiMaggio was named a member of the board of trustees at Saint Anselm College in Goffstown, New Hampshire. He served under college president Fr. Jonathan DeFelice and helped lead the college through four decades of expansion. DiMaggio was awarded an honorary degree by the college in 1981, and his wife Emily received one in 1999.

DiMaggio was inducted into the Boston Red Sox Hall of Fame in 1995.

=== Military service ===
After the 1942 season, DiMaggio enlisted in the United States Navy with initial service at Naval Station Treasure Island in San Francisco, California. He deployed to Australia and the Philippines during World War II. While stationed in Australia, he and Phil Rizzuto flew to Honolulu to play in the 1944 Army–Navy World Series. He also played for the Norfolk Naval Training Station team. He was discharged in 1945 as a chief petty officer.

== Death ==
DiMaggio died on May 8, 2009, at his home in Marion, Massachusetts. He was 92 years old and had been suffering from pneumonia. His requiem Mass was celebrated by his friend Fr. Jonathan DeFelice at St. Paul's Catholic Church in Wellesley, Massachusetts.

== See also ==
- Bay Area Sports Hall of Fame
- List of Boston Red Sox team records
- List of Major League Baseball career runs scored leaders
- List of Major League Baseball annual runs scored leaders
- List of Major League Baseball annual stolen base leaders
- List of Major League Baseball annual triples leaders
- List of Major League Baseball players who spent their entire career with one franchise
