= Ted Williams =

American baseball player (1918–2002)

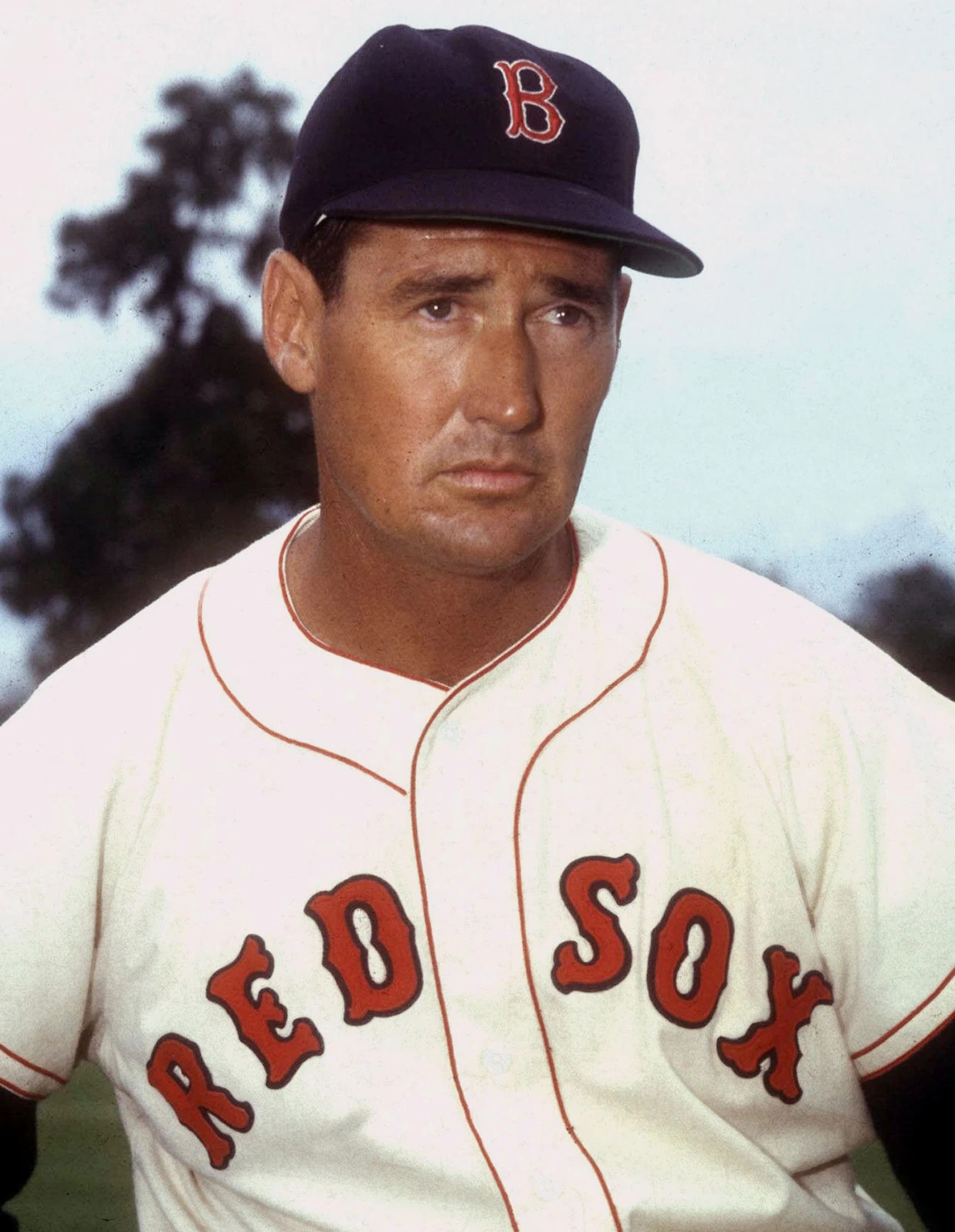
- Williams with the Boston Red Sox in 1958
- Left fielder / Manager
- Born: August 30, 1918; San Diego, California, U.S.
- Died: July 5, 2002 (aged 83); Inverness, Florida, U.S.
- Batted: Left Threw: Right

MLB debut
- April 20, 1939, for the Boston Red Sox

Last MLB appearance
- September 28, 1960, for the Boston Red Sox

MLB statistics
- Batting average: .344
- Hits: 2,654
- Home runs: 521
- Runs batted in: 1,839
- On-base percentage: .482
- Managerial record: 273–364
- Winning %: .429
- Stats at Baseball Reference

Teams
- As player: Boston Red Sox (1939–1942, 1946–1960); As manager: Washington Senators / Texas Rangers (1969–1972)

Career highlights and awards
- 19× All-Star (1940–1942, 1946–1951, 1953–1960²); 2× AL MVP (1946, 1949); 2× Triple Crown (1942, 1947); 6× AL batting champion (1941, 1942, 1947, 1948, 1957, 1958); 4× AL home run leader (1941, 1942, 1947, 1949); 4× AL RBI leader (1939, 1942, 1947, 1949); MLB record .482 career on-base percentage; Boston Red Sox No. 9 retired; Boston Red Sox Hall of Fame; San Diego Padres Hall of Fame; Major League Baseball All-Century Team; Major League Baseball All-Time Team

Member of the National

Baseball Hall of Fame
- Induction: 1966
- Vote: 93.4% (first ballot)

Theodore Samuel Williams (August 30, 1918 – July 5, 2002) was an American professional baseball player and manager. He played his entire 19-year Major League Baseball (MLB) career, primarily as a left fielder, for the Boston Red Sox from 1939 to 1960; his career was interrupted by military service during World War II and the Korean War. Nicknamed "Teddy Ballgame", "the Kid", "the Splendid Splinter", and "the Thumper", Williams is widely regarded as one of the greatest hitters in baseball history.

Williams was a 19-time All-Star, a two-time recipient of the American League (AL) Most Valuable Player Award, a six-time AL batting champion and a two-time Triple Crown winner. He finished his playing career with a .344 batting average, 521 home runs, and a 1.116 on-base plus slugging percentage, the second highest of all time. His career batting average is the highest of any MLB player whose career was played primarily after World War II, and it ranks 11th all-time.

Born and raised in San Diego, Williams played baseball throughout his youth. After joining the Red Sox in 1939, he immediately emerged as one of the sport's best hitters. In 1941, Williams posted a .406 batting average; he is the last National League or AL baseball player to bat over .400 in a season. (Note: Since 2020, MLB has considered seven Negro Leagues to be major leagues. Before this decision, Williams was the last MLB player to hit over .400 for a season.) Williams's career .482 on-base percentage is the highest of all-time. Williams followed this up by winning his first Triple Crown in 1942. Williams was required to interrupt his baseball career in 1943 to serve three years in the United States Navy and Marine Corps during World War II. Upon returning to MLB in 1946, Williams won his first AL MVP Award and played in his only World Series. In 1947, he won his second Triple Crown. Williams was returned to active military duty for portions of the 1952 and 1953 seasons to serve as a Marine combat aviator in the Korean War. In 1957 and 1958, he was the AL batting champion for the fifth and sixth time. In the process, he became the oldest player to win a batting crown at 39 and 40 years old, respectively.

Williams retired from playing in 1960. He was inducted into the Baseball Hall of Fame in 1966, in his first year of eligibility. Williams managed the Washington Senators / Texas Rangers franchise from 1969 to 1972. An avid sport fisherman, he hosted a television program about fishing, and was inducted into the IGFA Fishing Hall of Fame. Williams's involvement in the Jimmy Fund helped raise millions in dollars for cancer care and research. In 1991, President George H. W. Bush presented Williams with the Presidential Medal of Freedom, the highest civilian award bestowed by the United States government. He was selected for the Major League Baseball All-Time Team in 1997 and the Major League Baseball All-Century Team in 1999.

== Early life ==
Theodore Samuel Williams was born on August 30, 1918, in San Diego, California, and named "Teddy Samuel" after former president Theodore "Teddy" Roosevelt and his own father, Samuel Stuart Williams. Williams said his middle name was in honor of a maternal uncle who had been killed in World War I, but that man was named Daniel Venzor. Williams disliked the name "Teddy" and later amended his birth certificate to read "Theodore" instead.

His father was a soldier, sheriff, and photographer from Ardsley, New York, who had served in the United States Army and was a veteran of the Philippine–American War. His mother, May Venzor, was born in El Paso, Texas, was an evangelist and lifelong soldier in the Salvation Army. Williams resented his mother's long hours working in the Salvation Army, and Williams and his brother cringed when she took them to the Army's street-corner revivals.

Williams's paternal ancestors were a mix of Welsh, English, and Irish. The maternal Spanish-Mexican side of Williams's family was quite diverse, also having Basque, Russian, and American Indian roots. Of his Mexican ancestry, he said, "If I had my mother's name, there is no doubt I would have run into problems in those days, [considering] the prejudices people had in Southern California."

Williams lived in San Diego's North Park neighborhood (4121 Utah Street). He spent much of his time playing ball with his friends at a field that later became known as Ted Williams Field. At the age of eight, he was taught how to throw a baseball by his uncle, Saul Venzor. Saul was one of his mother's four brothers. A former semi-professional baseball player, he had pitched against Babe Ruth, Lou Gehrig, and Joe Gordon in an exhibition game. When Williams was a boy, his heroes were Pepper Martin of the St. Louis Cardinals and Bill Terry of the New York Giants. Williams graduated from Herbert Hoover High School in San Diego, where he played baseball as a pitcher and was the star of the team. During this time, he also played American Legion Baseball, and later was named the 1960 American Legion Baseball Graduate of the Year.

Though Williams had offers from the St. Louis Cardinals and the New York Yankees while he was still in high school, his mother thought that he was too young to leave home. He signed with the local Pacific Coast League (PCL) club, the San Diego Padres.

== Professional career ==
=== Minor leagues ===
Williams played back-up behind Vince DiMaggio and Ivey Shiver on the (then) Pacific Coast League's San Diego Padres. While in the Pacific Coast League in 1936, Williams met future teammates and friends Dom DiMaggio and Bobby Doerr, who were on the Pacific Coast League's San Francisco Seals. When Shiver announced that he was quitting to become a high-school football coach in Savannah, Georgia, the job, by default, was open for Williams. Williams posted a .271 batting average and 11 runs batted in (RBI) on 107 at bats in 42 games for the Padres in 1936. Unknown to Williams, he had caught the eye of the Boston Red Sox's general manager, Eddie Collins, while Collins was scouting Doerr and the shortstop George Myatt in August 1936.

Collins later explained, "It wasn't hard to find Ted Williams. He stood out like a brown cow in a field of white cows." In the 1937 season, after graduating from Hoover High in the winter, Williams finally broke into the lineup on June 22, when he hit an inside-the-park home run to help the Padres win 3–2. The Padres ended up winning the PCL title, while Williams ended up hitting .291 with 23 home runs and 98 RBI in 138 games. Meanwhile, Collins kept in touch with Padres owner Bill "Hardrock" Lane, calling him two times throughout the season. In December 1937, during the winter meetings, the deal was made between Lane and Collins, sending Williams to the Boston Red Sox and giving Lane $35,000 and two major leaguers, Dom D'Allessandro and Al Niemiec, and two other minor leaguers.

In 1938, the 19-year-old Williams was 10 days late to spring training camp in Sarasota, Florida, because of a flood in California that blocked the railroads. Williams had to borrow $200 from a bank to make the trip from San Diego to Sarasota. Also during spring training, Williams was nicknamed "the Kid" by Red Sox equipment manager Johnny Orlando, who, after Williams arrived to Sarasota for the first time, said, "'The Kid' has arrived". Orlando still called Williams "the Kid" 20 years later, and the nickname stuck with Williams for the rest of his life. Williams remained in major league spring training for about a week. Williams was then sent to the Double-A-league Minneapolis Millers. While in the Millers training camp for the springtime, Williams met Rogers Hornsby, who had hit over .400 three times, including a .424 average in 1924. Hornsby, who was a coach for the Millers that spring, gave Williams useful advice, including how to "get a good pitch to hit". Talking with the game's greats would become a pattern for Williams, who also talked with Hugh Duffy, who hit .438 in 1894, Bill Terry who hit .401 in 1930, and Ty Cobb, with whom he would argue that a batter should hit up on the ball, opposed to Cobb's view that a batter should hit down on the ball.

While in Minnesota, Williams quickly became the team's star. He collected his first hit in the Millers' first game of the season, as well as his first and second home runs during his third game. Both were inside-the-park home runs, with the second traveling an estimated 500 feet (150 m) on the fly to a 512-foot (156 m) center field fence. Williams later had a 22 game hitting streak that lasted from Memorial Day through mid-June. While the Millers ended up sixth place in an eight-team race, Williams ended up hitting .366 with 46 home runs and 142 RBI in 148 games. He received the American Association's Triple Crown and finished second in the voting for Most Valuable Player.

=== Boston Red Sox (1939–1942, 1946–1960) ===
==== 1939–1940 ====
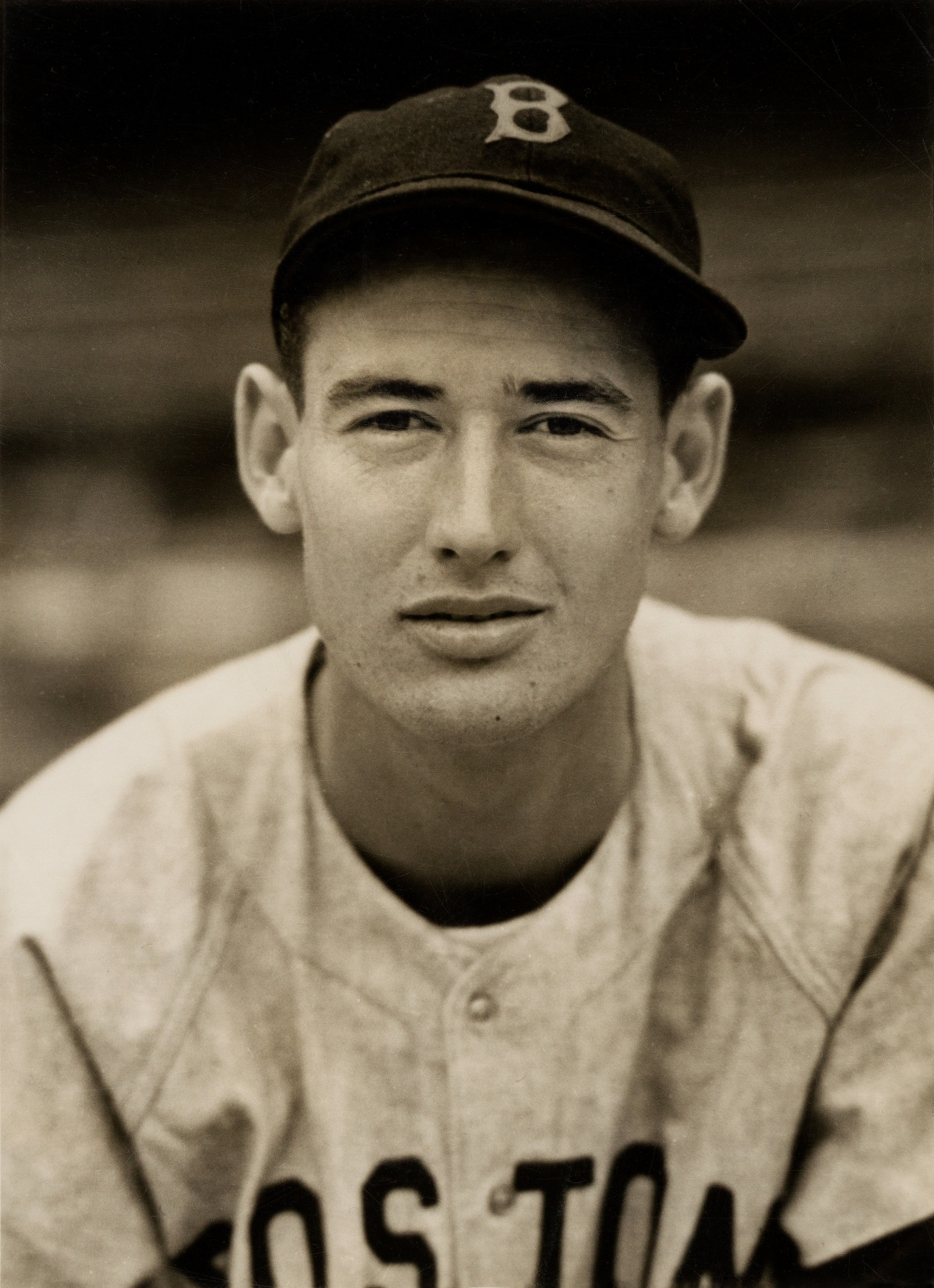
Williams during his rookie season

Williams came to spring training three days late in 1939, thanks to Williams driving from California to Florida, as well as respiratory problems, the latter of which would plague Williams for the rest of his career. In the winter, the Red Sox traded right fielder Ben Chapman to the Cleveland Indians to make room for Williams on the roster, even though Chapman had hit .340 in the previous season. This led Boston Globe sports journalist Gerry Moore to quip, "Not since Joe DiMaggio broke in with the Yankees by "five for five" in St. Petersburg in 1936 has any baseball rookie received the nationwide publicity that has been accorded this spring to Theodore Francis [sic] Williams". Williams inherited Chapman's number 9 on his uniform as opposed to Williams's number 5 in the previous spring training. He made his major league debut against the New York Yankees on April 20, going 1-for-4 against Yankee pitcher Red Ruffing. This was the only game which featured both Williams and Lou Gehrig playing against one another.

In his first series at Fenway Park, Williams hit a double, a home run, and a triple, the first two against Cotton Pippen, who had given Williams his first strikeout as a professional while Williams had been in San Diego. By July, Williams was hitting just .280, but leading the league in RBI. Johnny Orlando, now Williams's friend, then gave Williams a quick pep talk, telling Williams that he should hit .335 with 35 home runs and he would drive in 150 runs. Williams said he would buy Orlando a Cadillac if this all came true. In 149 games, Williams batted .327 with 31 home runs and 145 RBI, leading the league in the latter category, the first rookie to lead the league in RBIs and finishing fourth in MVP voting. He also led the AL in walks, with 107, a rookie record. Even though there was not a Rookie of the Year award yet in 1939, Babe Ruth declared Williams to be the Rookie of the Year, which Williams later said was "good enough for me".

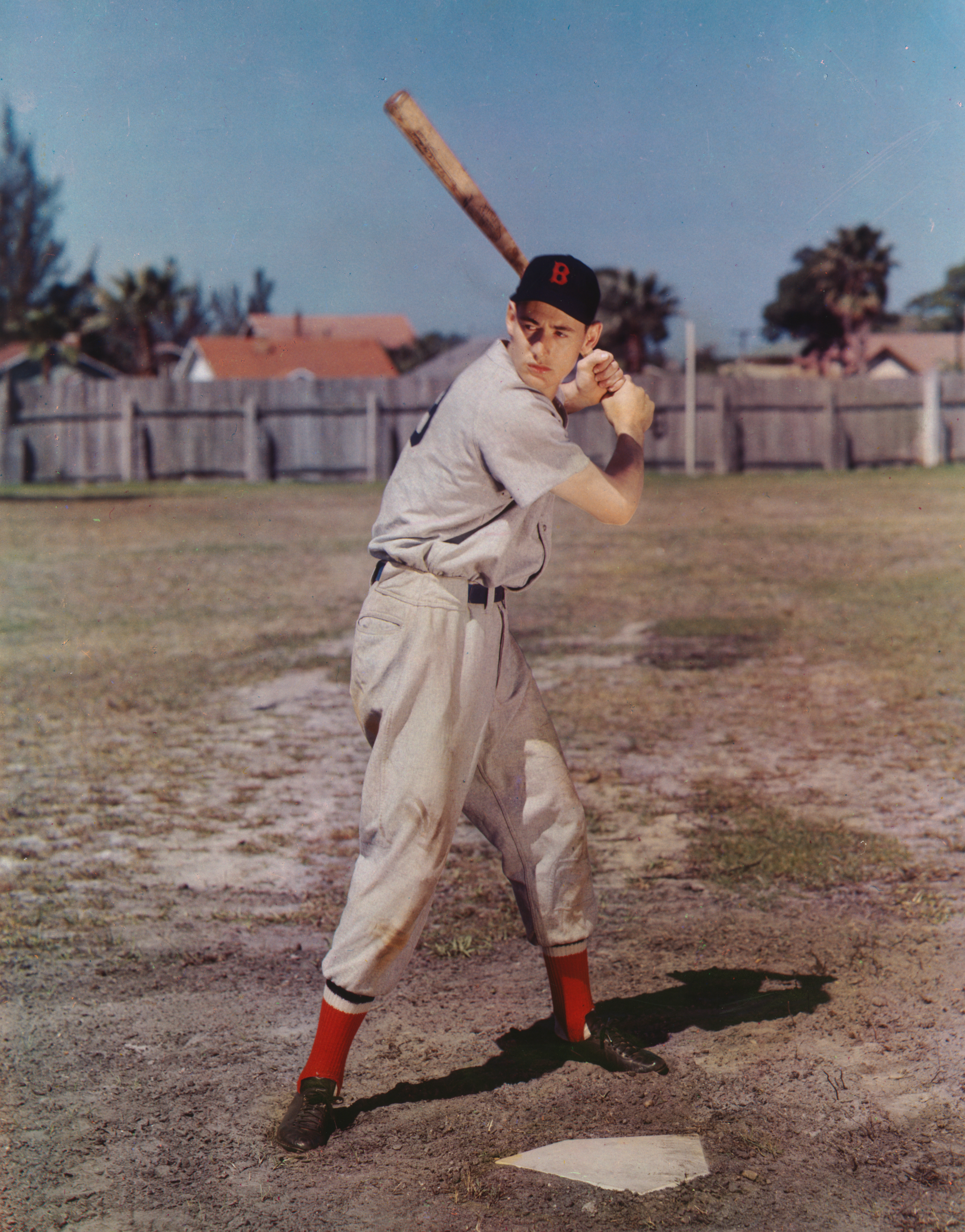
Williams in 1940

Williams's pay doubled in 1940, going from $5,000 to $10,000. A new bullpen was added in right field of Fenway Park, reducing the distance from home plate from 400 feet to 380 feet and earning the nickname "Williamsburg" for being "obviously designed for Williams". Williams was then switched from right field to left field because there would be less sun in his eyes and it would give Dom DiMaggio a chance to play center. Finally, Williams was flip-flopped in the order with the great slugger Jimmie Foxx, with the idea that Williams would get more pitches to hit. Pitchers, though, proved willing to pitch around the eagle-eyed Williams in favor of facing the 32-year-old Foxx, the reigning AL home run champion, followed by the still highly productive 33-year-old Joe Cronin, the player-manager. Williams also made his first of 16 All-Star Game appearances in 1940, going 0-for-2. Although Williams hit .344, his power and runs batted in were down from the previous season, with 23 home runs and 113 RBI in 144 games played. Williams also caused a controversy in mid-August when he called his salary "peanuts", along with saying he hated the city of Boston and reporters, leading reporters to lash back at him, saying that he should be traded. Williams said that the "only real fun" he had in 1940 was being able to pitch once on August 24, when he pitched the last two innings in a 12–1 loss to the Detroit Tigers, allowing one earned run on three hits, while striking out one batter, Rudy York.

==== 1941 ====
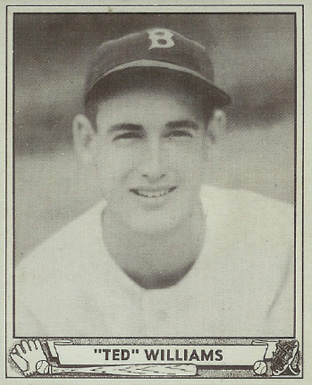
Williams's 1940 Play Ball baseball card

In the second week of spring training in 1941, Williams broke a bone in his right ankle, limiting him to pinch hitting for the first two weeks of the season. Bobby Doerr later claimed that the injury would be the foundation of Williams's season, as it forced him to put less pressure on his right foot for the rest of the season. Against the Chicago White Sox on May 7, in extra innings, Williams told the Red Sox pitcher, Charlie Wagner, to hold the White Sox, since he was going to hit a home run. In the 11th inning, Williams's prediction came true, as he hit a big blast to help the Red Sox win.

The home run is still considered to be the longest home run ever hit in the old Comiskey Park, with some saying that it went 600 feet (180 m). Williams's average slowly climbed in the first half of May, and, on May 15, he started a 22-game hitting streak. From May 17 to June 1, Williams batted .536, with his season average going above .400 on May 25 and then continuing up to .430. By the All-Star break, Williams was hitting .406 with 16 home runs and 62 RBI.

In the 1941 All-Star Game, Williams batted fourth behind Joe DiMaggio, who was in the midst of his record-breaking hitting streak, having hit safely in 48 consecutive games. In the fourth inning, Williams doubled to drive in a run. With the National League (NL) leading 5–2 in the eighth inning, Williams struck out in the middle of an American League (AL) rally. In the ninth inning, the AL still trailed 5–3; Ken Keltner and Joe Gordon singled, and Cecil Travis walked to load the bases. DiMaggio grounded to the infield and Billy Herman, attempting to complete a double play, threw wide of first base, allowing Keltner to score. With the score 5–4 and runners on first and third, Williams homered with his eyes closed to secure a 7–5 AL win. Williams later said that that game-winning home run "remains to this day the most thrilling hit of my life".

In late August, Williams was hitting .402. Williams said that "just about everybody was rooting for me" to hit .400 in the season, including Yankee fans, who gave pitcher Lefty Gomez a "hell of a boo" after walking Williams with the bases loaded after Williams had gotten three straight hits one game in September. In mid-September, Williams was hitting .413, but dropped a point a game from then on. Before the final two games on September 28, a doubleheader against the Philadelphia Athletics, he was batting .39955, which would have been officially rounded up to .400. Red Sox manager Joe Cronin offered him the chance to sit out the final day, but he declined. "If I'm going to be a .400 hitter", he said at the time, "I want more than my toenails on the line." Williams went 6-for-8 on the day, finishing the season at .406. (Sacrifice flies were counted as at-bats in 1941; under today's rules, Williams would have hit between .411 and .419, based on contemporaneous game accounts.) Philadelphia fans ran out on the field to surround Williams after the game, forcing him to protect his hat from being stolen; he was helped into the clubhouse by his teammates. Along with his .406 average, Williams also hit 37 home runs and recorded 120 RBI in 143 games, missing the Triple Crown by five RBI.

Williams's 1941 season is often considered to be the best offensive season of all time, though the MVP award would go to DiMaggio. The .406 batting average—his first of six batting championships—is still the highest single-season average in Red Sox history and was the highest batting average in the major leagues since 1924 and the last time any National or AL player has hit over .400 for a season after averaging at least 3.1 plate appearances per game. ("If I had known hitting .400 was going to be such a big deal", he quipped in 1991, "I would have done it again.") Williams's on-base percentage of .553 and slugging percentage of .735 that season are both also the highest single-season averages in Red Sox history. The .553 OBP stood as a major league record until it was broken by Barry Bonds in 2002, and his .735 slugging percentage was the highest mark in the major leagues between 1932 and 1994. His OPS of 1.287 that year, a Red Sox record, was the highest in the major leagues between 1923 and 2001. Despite playing in only 143 games that year, Williams led the league with 135 runs scored and 37 home runs, and he finished third with 335 total bases, the most home runs, runs scored, and total bases by a Red Sox player since Jimmie Foxx's in 1938. Williams placed second in MVP voting; DiMaggio won, 291 votes to 254, on the strength of his record-breaking 56-game hitting streak and league-leading 125 RBI.

==== U.S. Navy and U.S. Marine Corps ====
In January 1942, Williams was drafted into the military, being put into Class 1-A. A friend of Williams suggested that Williams see the advisor of the governor's Selective Service Appeal Agent, since Williams was the sole support of his mother, arguing that Williams should not have been placed in Class 1-A, and said that Williams should be reclassified to Class 3-A. Williams was reclassified to 3-A ten days later. Afterwards, the public reaction was extremely negative, even though the baseball book Season of '42 states that only four All-Stars and one first-line pitcher entered military service during the 1942 season. (Many more MLB players would enter service during the 1943 season.)

Quaker Oats stopped sponsoring Williams, and Williams, who previously had eaten Quaker products "all the time", never "[ate] one since" the company stopped sponsoring him. Despite the trouble with the draft board, Williams had a new salary of $30,000 in 1942. In the season, Williams won the Triple Crown, with a .356 batting average, 36 home runs, and 137 RBI in 150 games. On May 21, Williams also hit his 100th career home run. He was the third Red Sox player to hit 100 home runs with the team, following teammates Jimmie Foxx and Joe Cronin. Despite winning the Triple Crown, Williams came in second in the MVP voting, losing to Joe Gordon of the Yankees. Williams felt that he should have gotten a "little more consideration" because of winning the Triple Crown, and he thought that "the reason I didn't get more consideration was because of the trouble I had with the draft [boards]".

Williams joined the Navy Reserve on May 22, 1942, went on active duty in 1943, and was commissioned a second lieutenant in the United States Marine Corps as a naval aviator on May 2, 1944. Williams also played on the baseball team in Chapel Hill, North Carolina, along with his Red Sox teammate Johnny Pesky in pre-flight training, after eight weeks in Amherst, Massachusetts, and the Civilian Pilot Training Course. While on the baseball team, Williams was sent back to Fenway Park on July 12, 1943, to play on an All-Star team managed by Babe Ruth. The newspapers reported that Ruth, when he finally met Williams, said "Hiya, kid. You remind me a lot of myself. I love to hit. You're one of the most natural ballplayers I've ever seen. And if my record is broken, I hope you're the one to do it". Williams later said that he was "flabbergasted" by the incident, as "after all, it was Babe Ruth". In the game, Williams hit a 425-foot home run to help give the American League All-Stars a 9–8 win.

==== Service baseball ====
On September 2, 1945, when the war ended, Lt. Williams was in Pearl Harbor, Hawaii awaiting orders as a replacement pilot. While in Pearl Harbor, Williams played baseball in the Navy League. Also in that eight-team league were Joe DiMaggio, Joe Gordon, and Stan Musial. The Service World Series, with the Army versus the Navy, attracted crowds of 40,000 for each game. The players said that it was even better than the actual World Series being played between the Detroit Tigers and Chicago Cubs that year.

==== 1946–1949 ====
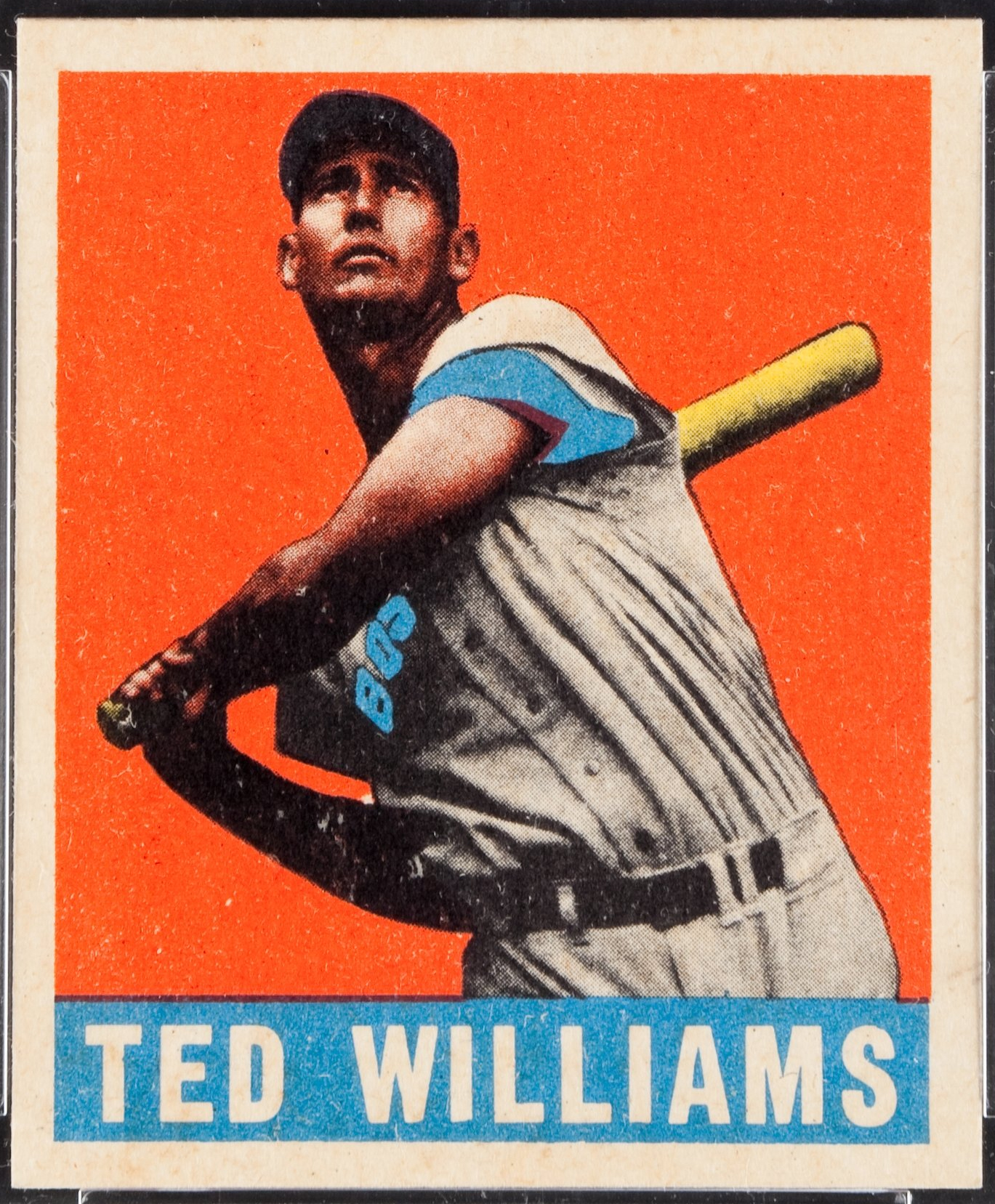
1948 baseball card

Williams was discharged by the Marine Corps on January 28, 1946, in time to begin preparations for the upcoming pro baseball season. He joined the Red Sox again in 1946, signing a $37,500 contract. On July 14, after Williams hit three home runs and eight RBI in the first game of a doubleheader, Lou Boudreau, inspired by Williams's consistent pull hitting to right field, created what would later be known as the Boudreau shift (also Williams shift) against Williams, having only one player on the left side of second base (the left fielder). Ignoring the shift, Williams walked twice, doubled, and grounded out to the shortstop, who was positioned in between first and second base. Also during 1946, the All-Star Game was held in Fenway Park. In the game, Williams homered in the fourth inning against Kirby Higbe, singled in a run in the fifth inning, singled in the seventh inning, and hit a three-run home run against Rip Sewell's "eephus pitch" in the eighth inning to help the American League win 12–0.

For the 1946 season, Williams hit .342 with 38 home runs and 123 RBI in 150 games, helping the Red Sox win the pennant on September 13, in a 1–0 win over Cleveland; Williams hit the only inside-the-park home run in his Major League career for the only run of the game. On June 9, he hit what is considered to be the longest home run in Fenway Park history, at 502 feet (153 m) and subsequently marked with a lone red seat in the Fenway bleachers. Williams ran away as the winner in the MVP voting. In early October, during an exhibition game in Fenway Park against an All-Star team, Williams was hit on the elbow by a curveball by the Washington Senators' pitcher Mickey Haefner. Williams was immediately taken out of the game; X-rays of his arm showed no damage, but his arm was "swelled up like a boiled egg", according to Williams. Williams could not swing a bat again until four days later, one day before the World Series, when he reported the arm as "sore". During the series, Williams batted .200 (5-for-25) with no home runs and just one RBI. The Red Sox lost in seven games. Fifty years later, when asked what one thing he would have done different in his life, Williams replied, "I'd have done better in the '46 World Series. God, I would". The 1946 World Series was the only World Series in which Williams ever appeared.

Williams signed a $70,000 contract in 1947. Williams was also almost traded for Joe DiMaggio in 1947. In late April, Red Sox owner Tom Yawkey and Yankees owner Dan Topping agreed to swap the players, but a day later canceled the deal when Yawkey requested that Yogi Berra come with DiMaggio. In May, Williams was hitting .337. Williams won the Triple Crown in 1947, but lost the MVP award to Joe DiMaggio, 202 points to 201 points. One writer left Williams off his ballot. Williams said that he thought that it was Mel Webb, whom Williams called a "grouchy old guy", although it now appears that it was not Webb, and three writers left DiMaggio off their ballots. Williams was the third major league player to have had at least four 30-home run and 100-RBI seasons in his first five years, joining Chuck Klein and Joe DiMaggio, and followed by Ralph Kiner, Mark Teixeira, Albert Pujols, and Ryan Braun through 2011.

In 1948, under their new manager, the ex-New York Yankee great skipper Joe McCarthy, Williams hit a league-leading .369 with 25 home runs and 127 RBIs, and was third in MVP voting. On April 29, Williams hit his 200th career home run. He became just the second player to hit 200 home runs in a Red Sox uniform, joining his former teammate Jimmie Foxx. On October 2, against the Yankees, Williams hit his 222nd career home run, tying Foxx for the Red Sox all-time record. In the Red Sox' final two games of the regular schedule, they beat the Yankees (to force a one-game playoff against the Cleveland Indians) and Williams got on base eight times out of ten plate appearances. In the playoff, Williams went 1-for-4, with the Red Sox losing 8–3.

In 1949, Williams received a new salary of $100,000 ($1,353,000 in current dollar terms). He hit .343 (losing the AL batting title by just .0002 to the Tigers' George Kell, thus missing the Triple Crown that year), hitting 43 home runs, his career high, and driving in 159 runs, tied for highest in the league; at one point, he got on base in 84 straight games, an MLB record that still stands today, helping him win the MVP trophy. On April 28, Williams hit his 223rd career home run, breaking the record for most home runs in a Red Sox uniform, passing Jimmie Foxx. Williams is still the Red Sox career home run leader. However, despite being ahead of the Yankees by one game just before a two-game series against them (last regular-season games for both teams), the Red Sox lost both of those games and the Yankees won the pennant. They went on to win the first of what would be five straight World Series titles, beginning with 1949. For the rest of Williams's career, the Yankees won nine pennants and six World Series titles, while the Red Sox never finished better than third place.

==== 1950–1955 ====
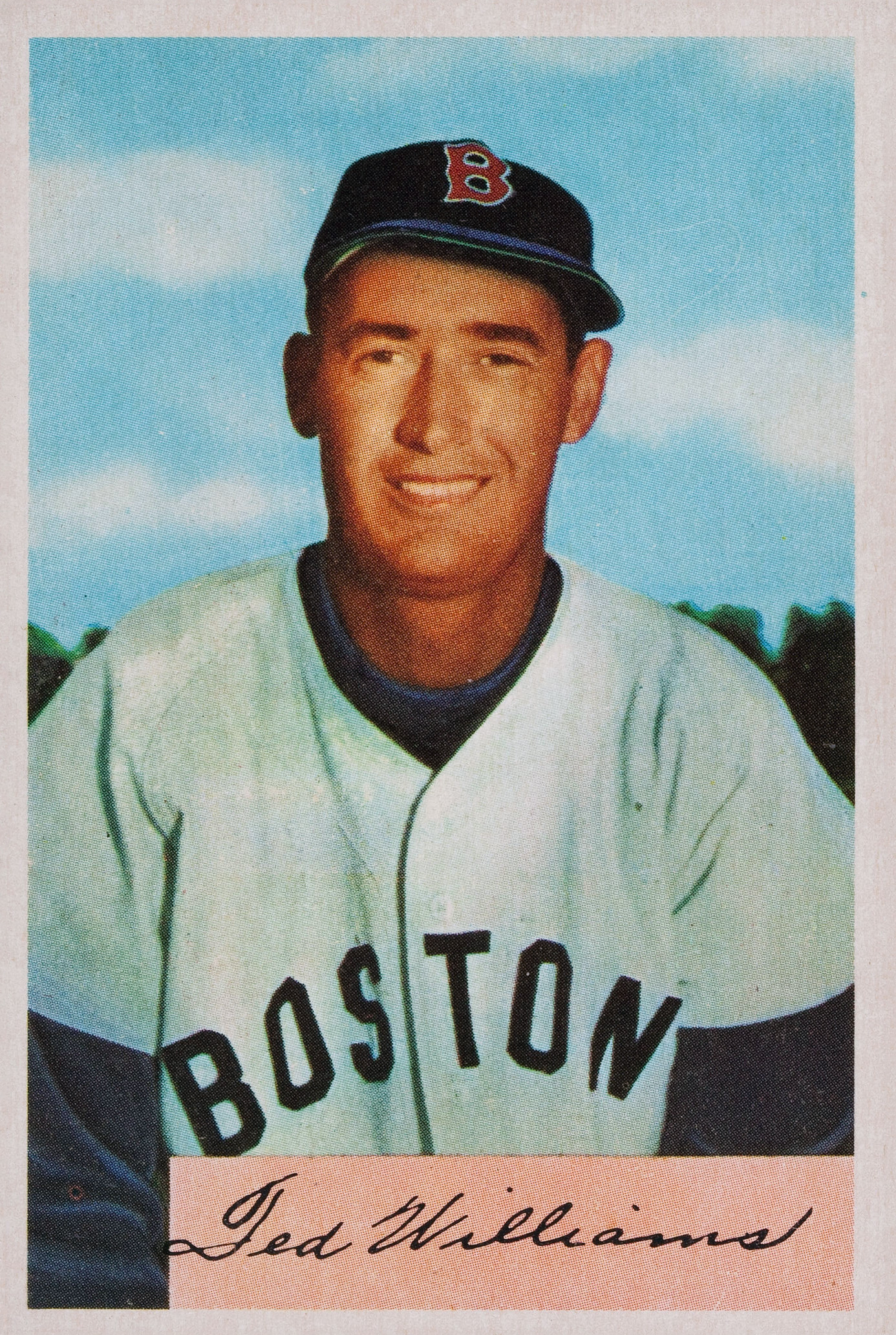
1954 baseball card

In 1950, Williams was playing in his eighth All-Star Game. In the first inning, Williams caught a line drive by Ralph Kiner, slamming into the Comiskey Park scoreboard and breaking his left arm. Williams stayed in the game, and he even singled in a run to give the American League the lead in the fifth inning, but by that time Williams's arm was a "balloon" and he was in great pain, so he left the game. Both of the doctors who X-rayed Williams held little hope for a full recovery. The doctors operated on Williams for two hours. When Williams took his cast off, he could only extend the arm to within four inches of his right arm. Williams only played 89 games in 1950, but managed to hit .317 with 28 home runs and 97 RBI. After the baseball season, Williams's elbow hurt so much he considered retirement, since he thought he would never be able to hit again. Tom Yawkey, the Red Sox owner, then sent Jack Fadden to Williams's Florida home to talk to him. Williams later thanked Fadden for saving his career.

In 1951, Williams "struggled", hitting .318, with his elbow still hurting. Despite this, he played in 148 games, 60 more than in the previous season, while hitting 30 home runs, two more than in 1950, and 126 RBI, 29 more than 1950. Despite his lower-than-usual production at bat, Williams made the All-Star team. On May 15, 1951, Williams became the 11th player in major league history to hit 300 career home runs. On May 21, Williams passed Chuck Klein for 10th place, on May 25 Williams passed Hornsby for ninth place, and on July 5 Williams passed Al Simmons for eighth place all-time in career home runs. After the season, manager Steve O'Neill was fired, with Lou Boudreau replacing him. Boudreau's first announcement as manager was that all Red Sox players were "expendable", including Williams.

Williams's name was called from a list of inactive reserves to serve on active duty in the Korean War on January 9, 1952. Williams, who was livid at his recalling, had a physical scheduled for April 2. Williams passed his physical and in May, after only playing in six major league games, began refresher flight training and qualification prior to service in Korea. Right before he left for Korea, the Red Sox had a "Ted Williams Day" in Fenway Park. Friends of Williams gave him a Cadillac, and the Red Sox gave Williams a memory book that was signed by 400,000 fans. The governor of Massachusetts and mayor of Boston were there, along with a Korean War veteran named Frederick Wolf who used a wheelchair for mobility. At the end of the ceremony, everyone in the park held hands and sang "Auld Lang Syne" to Williams, a moment which he later said "moved me quite a bit." Private Wolf (an injured Korean veteran from Brooklyn) presented gifts from wounded veterans to Ted Williams. Ted choked and was only able to say,"... ok kid ...". The Red Sox went on to win the game 5–3, thanks to a two-run home run by Williams in the seventh inning.

In August 1953, Williams practiced with the Red Sox for ten days before playing in his first game, garnering a large ovation from the crowd and hitting a home run in the eighth inning. In the season, Williams ended up hitting .407 with 13 home runs and 34 RBIs in 37 games and 110 at bats (not nearly enough plate appearances to qualify for that season's batting title). On September 6, Williams hit his 332nd career home run, passing Hank Greenberg for seventh all-time.

On the first day of spring training in 1954, Williams broke his collarbone running after a line drive. Williams was out for six weeks, and in April he wrote an article with Joe Reichler of the Saturday Evening Post saying that he intended to retire at the end of the season. Williams returned to the Red Sox lineup on May 7, and he hit .345 with 29 home runs and 89 RBI across 386 at bats in 117 games, although Bobby Ávila, who had hit .341, won the batting championship. This was because it was required then that a batter needed 400 at bats, despite Lou Boudreau's attempt to bat Williams second in the lineup to get more at-bats. Williams led the league in base on balls with 136, which kept him from qualifying under the rules at the time. By today's standards (plate appearances), he would have been the champion. The rule was changed shortly thereafter to keep this from happening again. On August 25, Williams passed Johnny Mize for sixth place, and on September 3, Williams passed Joe DiMaggio for fifth all-time in career home runs with his 362nd career home run. He finished the season with 366 career home runs. On September 26, Williams "retired" after the Red Sox's final game of the season.

During the off-season of 1954, Williams was offered the chance to be manager of the Red Sox. Williams declined, and he suggested that Pinky Higgins, who had previously played on the 1946 Red Sox team as the third baseman, become the manager of the team. Higgins later was hired as the Red Sox manager in 1955. Williams sat out the first month of the 1955 season due to a divorce settlement with his wife, Doris. When Williams returned, he signed a $98,000 contract on May 13. Williams batted .356 in 320 at bats on the season, hitting 28 home runs and driving in 83 runs in 98 games. For his performance, he was named the "Comeback Player of the Year."

==== 1956–1960 ====
On July 17 1956, Williams became the fifth player to hit 400 home runs, following Mel Ott in 1941, Jimmie Foxx in 1938, Lou Gehrig in 1936, and Babe Ruth in 1927. Three weeks later, at home against the Yankees on August 7, after Williams was booed for dropping a fly ball from Mickey Mantle, he spat at one of the fans, who was taunting him on the top of the dugout; Williams was fined $5,000 for the incident. The following night, against Baltimore, Williams was greeted by a large ovation, and received an even larger one when he hit a home run in the sixth inning to break a 2–2 tie. In the Boston Globe, the publishers ran a "What Globe Readers Say About Ted" section made out of letters about Williams, which were either the sportswriters or the "loud mouths" in the stands. Williams explained years later, "From '56 on, I realized that people were for me. The writers had written that the fans should show me they didn't want me, and I got the biggest ovation yet". Williams lost the batting title to Mickey Mantle in 1956, batting .345 to Mantle's .353, with Mantle on his way to winning the Triple Crown.

In 1957, Williams batted .388 to lead the majors, then signed a contract in February 1958 for a record high $125,000 (or $135,000). At age forty that season, he again led the American League with a .328 batting average, and also hit 26 home runs and 85 RBI in 129 games.

When Pumpsie Green became the first black player on the Red Sox—the last major league team to integrate—in 1959, Williams openly welcomed Green.

Williams ended his career with a home run in his last at-bat on September 28, 1960. He refused to salute the fans as he returned to the dugout after he crossed home plate or after he was replaced in left field by Carroll Hardy. An essay written by John Updike the following month for The New Yorker, "Hub Fans Bid Kid Adieu", chronicles this event.

== Career overall ==
At the time of his retirement, Williams ranked third all-time in home runs (behind Babe Ruth and Jimmie Foxx), seventh in RBIs (after Ruth, Cap Anson, Lou Gehrig, Ty Cobb, Foxx, and Mel Ott), and seventh in batting average (behind Cobb, Rogers Hornsby, Shoeless Joe Jackson, Lefty O'Doul, Ed Delahanty and Tris Speaker). His career batting average of .3444 is the highest of any player who played his entire career in the live-ball era following 1920.

Most modern statistical analyses place Williams, along with Ruth and Barry Bonds, among the three most potent hitters to have played the game. Williams's baseball season of 1941 is often considered favorably with the greatest seasons of Ruth and Bonds in terms of various offensive statistical measures such as slugging, on-base and "offensive winning percentage."

Williams is one of only 29 players in baseball history to date to have appeared in Major League games in four decades.

| G | AB | R | H | 2B | 3B | HR | RBI | TB | XBH | BB | AVG | OBP | SLG | OPS | FLD% |
|---|---|---|---|---|---|---|---|---|---|---|---|---|---|---|---|
| 2,292 | 7,706 | 1,798 | 2,654 | 525 | 71 | 521 | 1,839 | 4,884 | 1,117 | 2,021 | .344 | **.482** | .634 | 1.116 | .974 |

Note: Bold indicates all-time MLB leader in category.

== Player profile ==
=== Playing style ===
"All I want out of life is that when I walk down the street, folks will say, 'There goes the greatest hitter who ever lived'."

— Ted Williams.

Williams was an obsessive student of hitting. He famously used a lighter bat than most sluggers, because it generated a faster swing. In 1970, he wrote a book on the subject, The Science of Hitting (revised 1986), which is still read by many baseball players. The book describes his theory of swinging only at pitches that came into ideal areas of his strike zone, a strategy Williams credited with his success as a hitter; as a result, Williams's bases-on-balls-to-plate-appearances ratio (.2065) is the highest of any player in the Hall of Fame.

Williams nearly always took the first pitch.

He helped pass his expertise of playing left field in front of the Green Monster to his successor on the Red Sox, Carl Yastrzemski.

=== Relationship with Boston media and fans ===
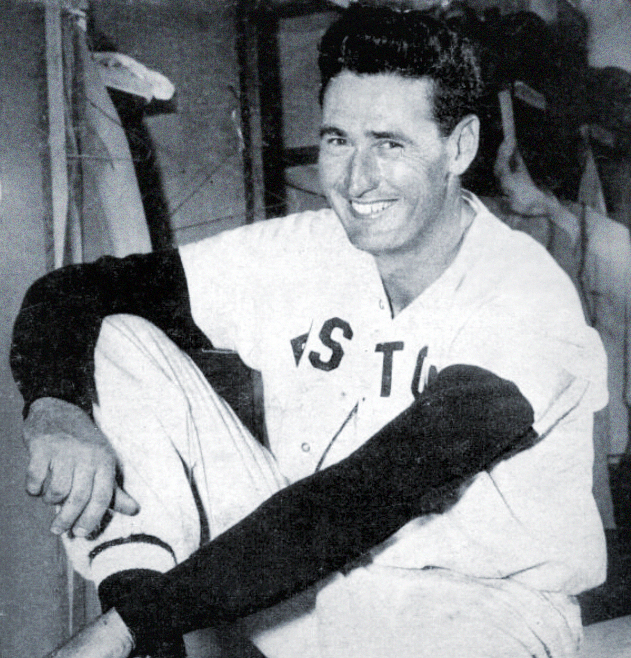
Williams in 1949

Williams was on uncomfortable terms with the Boston newspapers for nearly twenty years, as he felt they liked to discuss his personal life as much as his baseball performance. He maintained a career-long feud with Sport due to a 1948 feature article in which the reporter included a quote from Williams's mother. Insecure about his upbringing, and stubborn because of immense confidence in his own talent, Williams made up his mind that the "knights of the keyboard", as he derisively labeled the press, were against him. After having hit for the league's Triple Crown in 1947, Williams narrowly lost the MVP award in a vote where one Midwestern newspaper writer left Williams entirely off his ten-player ballot.

During his career, some sportswriters also criticized aspects of Williams's baseball performance, including what they viewed as his lackadaisical fielding and lack of clutch hitting. Williams pushed back, saying: "They're always saying that I don't hit in the clutches. Well, there are a lot [of games] when I do." He also asserted that it made no sense crashing into an outfield wall to try to make a difficult catch because of the risk of injury or being out of position to make the play after missing the ball.

Williams treated most of the press accordingly, as he described in his 1969 memoir My Turn at Bat. Williams also had an uneasy relationship with the Boston fans, though he could be very cordial one-to-one. He felt at times a good deal of gratitude for their passion and their knowledge of the game. On the other hand, Williams was temperamental, high-strung, and at times tactless. In his biography, Ronald Reis relates how Williams committed two fielding miscues in a doubleheader in 1950 and was roundly booed by Boston fans. He bowed three times to various sections of Fenway Park and made an obscene gesture. When he came to bat he spat in the direction of fans near the dugout. The incident caused an avalanche of negative media reaction, and inspired sportswriter Austen Lake's famous comment that, when Williams's name was announced, the sound was like "autumn wind moaning through an apple orchard."

Another incident occurred in 1958 in a game against the Washington Senators. Williams struck out, and, as he stepped from the batter's box, swung his bat violently in anger. The bat slipped from his hands, was launched into the stands and struck a 60-year-old woman who turned out to be the housekeeper of the Red Sox general manager Joe Cronin. While the incident was an accident and Williams apologized to the woman personally, to all appearances it seemed at the time that Williams had hurled the bat in a fit of temper.

Williams gave generously to those in need. He was especially linked with the Jimmy Fund of the Dana–Farber Cancer Institute, which provides support for children's cancer research and treatment. Williams used his celebrity to virtually launch the fund, which raised more than $750 million between 1948 and 2010. Throughout his career, Williams made countless bedside visits to children being treated for cancer, which Williams insisted go unreported. Often parents of sick children would learn at check-out time that "Mr. Williams has taken care of your bill". The Fund recently stated that "Williams would travel everywhere and anywhere, no strings or paychecks attached, to support the cause... His name is synonymous with our battle against all forms of cancer."

Williams demanded loyalty from those around him. He could not forgive the fickle nature of the fans—booing a player for booting a ground ball, and then turning around and roaring approval of the same player for hitting a home run. Despite the cheers and adulation of most of his fans, the occasional boos directed at him in Fenway Park led Williams to stop tipping his cap in acknowledgment after a home run.

Williams maintained this policy up to and including his swan song in 1960. After hitting a home run at Fenway Park, which would be his last career at-bat, Williams characteristically refused either to tip his cap as he circled the bases or to respond to prolonged cheers of "We want Ted!" from the crowd by making an appearance from the dugout. The Boston manager Pinky Higgins sent Williams to his fielding position in left field to start the ninth inning, but then immediately recalled him for his back-up Carroll Hardy, thus allowing Williams to receive one last ovation as he jogged onto then off the field, and he did so without reacting to the crowd. Williams's aloof attitude led the writer John Updike to observe wryly that "Gods do not answer letters."

Williams's final home run did not take place during the final game of the 1960 season, but rather in the Red Sox's last home game that year. The Red Sox played three more games, but they were on the road in New York City and Williams did not appear in any of them, as it became clear that Williams's final home at-bat would be the last one of his career.

In 1991, on Ted Williams Day at Fenway Park, Williams pulled a Red Sox cap from out of his jacket and tipped it to the crowd. This was the first time that he had done so since his earliest days as a player.

Williams once had a friendship with Ty Cobb, with whom he often had discussions about baseball. He often touted Rogers Hornsby as being the greatest right-handed hitter of all time. In Al Stump's now discredited biography about Cobb, he claimed that this assertion actually led to a split in the relationship between Cobb and Williams. Once during one of their yearly debate sessions on the greatest hitters of all time, Williams asserted that Hornsby was one of the greatest of all time. Cobb apparently had strong feelings about Hornsby and he threw a fit, expelling Williams from his hotel room. However, this story was later refuted by Williams himself.

== Military service ==
Ted Williams
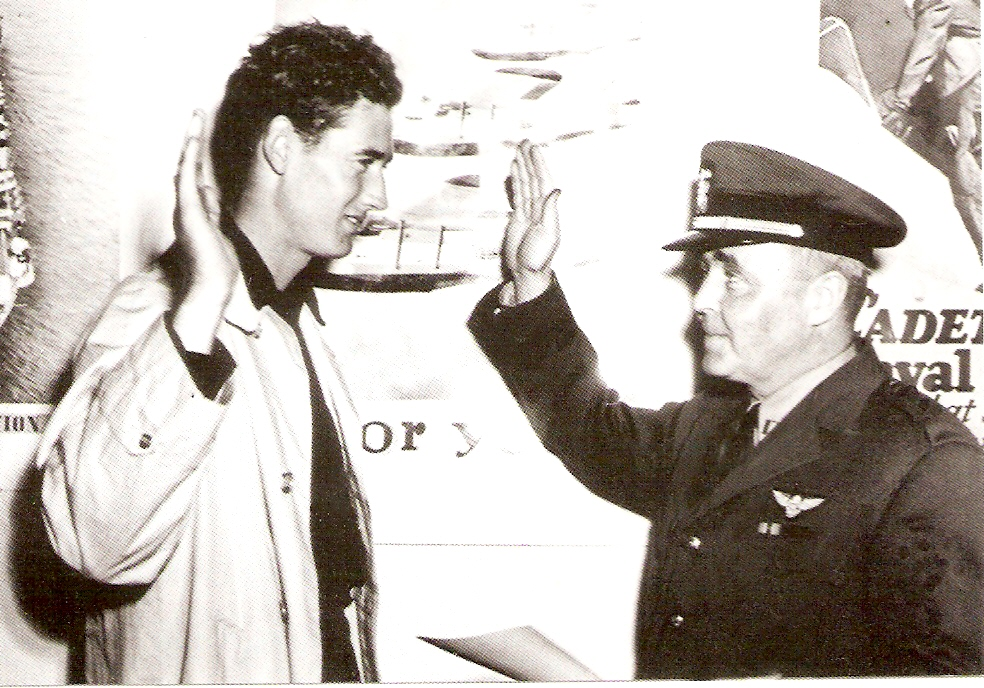
- Williams being sworn into the U.S. Navy Reserve on May 22, 1942
- Military career
- Allegiance: United States
- Branch: United States Navy; United States Marine Corps
- Service years: 1942–46, 1952–53
- Rank: Captain
- Units: U.S. Navy Reserve; U.S. Marine Corps Reserve
- Conflicts: World War II; Korean War
- Awards: Naval Aviator Badge; Air Medal with two Gold Stars; Navy Unit Commendation; American Campaign Medal; Asiatic–Pacific Campaign Medal with Bronze Star; World War II Victory Medal; Navy Occupation Service Medal; National Defense Service Medal; Korean Service Medal with two Bronze Stars; United Nations Service Medal; ROK Presidential Unit Citation

=== World War II ===
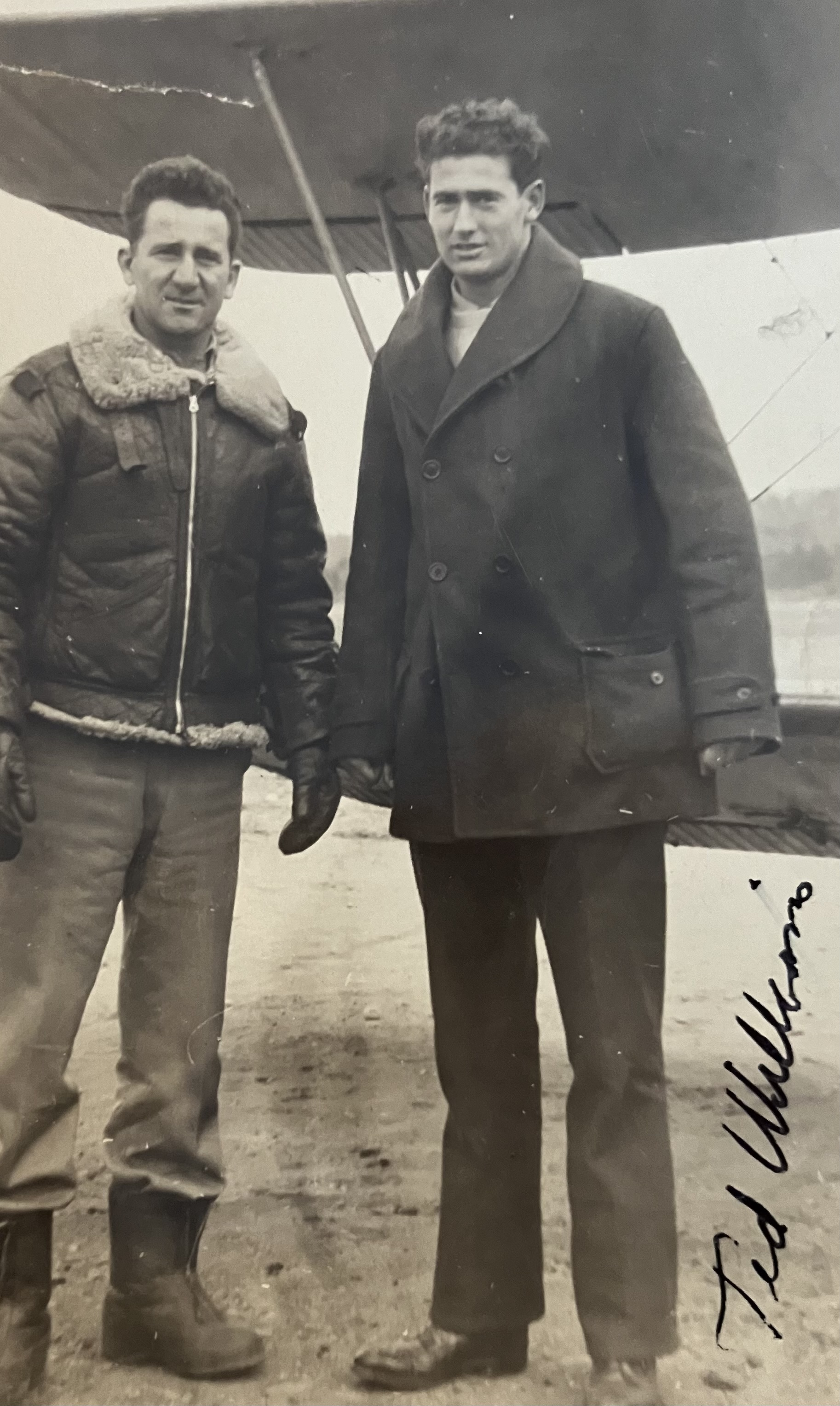
Ted Williams (Right) while in Flight Training at Turners Falls, MA Airport

Williams served as a Naval Aviator during World War II and the Korean War. Unlike many other major league players, he did not spend all of his war-time playing on service teams. Williams had been classified 3-A by Selective Service prior to the war, a dependency deferment because he was his mother's sole means of financial support. When his classification was changed to 1-A following the American entry into World War II, Williams appealed to his local draft board. The draft board ruled that his draft status should not have been changed. He made a public statement that once he had built up his mother's trust fund, he intended to enlist. Even so, criticism in the media, including withdrawal of an endorsement contract by Quaker Oats, resulted in his enlistment in the U.S. Naval Reserve on May 22, 1942.

Williams did not opt for an easy assignment playing baseball for the Navy, but rather joined the V-5 program to become a Naval aviator. Williams was first sent to the Navy's Preliminary Ground School at Amherst College for six months of academic instruction in various subjects including math and navigation, where he achieved a 3.85 grade point average.

Williams was talented as a pilot, and so enjoyed it that he had to be ordered by the Navy to leave training to personally accept his American League 1942 Major League Baseball Triple Crown. Williams's Red Sox teammate, Johnny Pesky, who went into the same aviation training program, said this about Williams: "He mastered intricate problems in fifteen minutes which took the average cadet an hour, and half of the other cadets there were college grads." Pesky again described Williams's acumen in the advanced training, for which Pesky personally did not qualify: "I heard Ted literally tore the sleeve target to shreds with his angle dives. He'd shoot from wingovers, zooms, and barrel rolls, and after a few passes the sleeve was ribbons. At any rate, I know he broke the all-time record for hits." Ted went to Jacksonville for a course in aerial gunnery, the combat pilot's payoff test, and broke all the records in reflexes, coordination, and visual-reaction time. "From what I heard. Ted could make a plane and its six 'pianos' (machine guns) play like a symphony orchestra", Pesky says. "From what they said, his reflexes, coordination, and visual reaction made him a built-in part of the machine."

Williams completed pre-flight training in Athens, Georgia, his primary training at NAS Bunker Hill, Indiana, and his advanced flight training at NAS Pensacola. He received his gold Naval Aviator wings and his commission as a second lieutenant in the U.S. Marine Corps on May 2, 1944.

Williams served as a flight instructor at NAS Pensacola teaching young pilots to fly the complicated F4U Corsair fighter plane. Williams was in Pearl Harbor awaiting orders to join the Fleet in the Western Pacific when the War in the Pacific ended. He finished the war in Hawaii, and then he was released from active duty on January 12, 1946, but he did remain in the Marine Corps Reserve.

=== Korean War ===
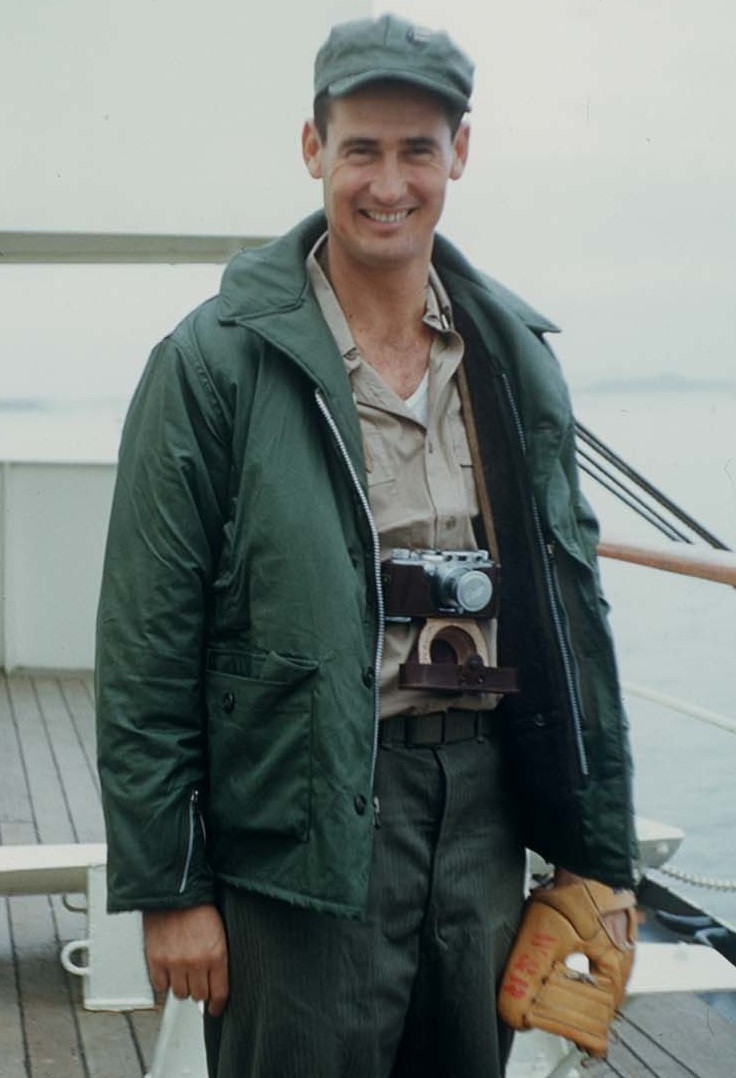
Williams aboard the USS Haven (AH-12) in 1953

On May 1, 1952, 14 months after his promotion to captain in the Marine Corps Reserve, Williams was recalled to active duty for service in the Korean War. He had not flown any aircraft for eight years but he turned down all offers to sit out the war in comfort as a member of a service baseball team. Nevertheless, Williams was resentful of being called up, which he admitted years later, particularly regarding the Navy's policy of calling up Inactive Reservists rather than members of the Active Reserve.

Williams reported for duty on May 2, 1952. After eight weeks of refresher flight training and qualification in the F9F Panther jet fighter with VMF-223 at the Marine Corps Air Station Cherry Point, North Carolina, Williams was assigned to VMF-311, Marine Aircraft Group 33 (MAG-33), based at the K-3 airfield in Pohang, South Korea.

On February 16, 1953, Williams, flying as the wingman for John Glenn (who would become the first American to orbit the earth), was part of a 35-plane raid against a tank and infantry training school just south of Pyongyang, North Korea. As the aircraft from VMF-115 and VMF-311 dove on the target, Williams's plane was hit by anti-aircraft fire, a piece of flak knocked out his hydraulics and electrical systems, causing Williams to have to "limp" his plane back to K-13 air base where he made a belly landing. For his actions of this day, he was awarded the Air Medal.

Williams flew 39 combat missions in Korea, earning the Air Medal with two Gold Stars representing second and third awards, before being withdrawn from flight status in June 1953 after a hospitalization for pneumonia. This resulted in the discovery of an inner ear infection that disqualified him from flight status. John Glenn described Williams as one of the best pilots he knew. In the last half of his missions, Williams was flying as Glenn's wingman.

Williams likely would have exceeded 600 career home runs if he had not served in the military, and might even have approached Babe Ruth's then record of 714. He might have set the record for career RBIs as well, exceeding Hank Aaron's total. While the absences in the Marine Corps took almost five years out of his baseball career, he never publicly complained about the time devoted to service in the Marine Corps. His biographer, Leigh Montville, argued that Williams was not happy about being pressed into service in South Korea, but he did what he thought was his patriotic duty.

Following his return to the United States in August 1953, he resigned his Reserve commission to resume his baseball career.

== Post-retirement ==
Ted Williams's number 9 was retired by the Boston Red Sox in 1984.

After retirement from play, Williams helped Boston's new left fielder, Carl Yastrzemski, in hitting, and was a regular visitor to the Red Sox' spring training camps from 1961 to 1966, where he worked as a special batting instructor. He served as executive assistant to Tom Yawkey (1961–65), then was named a team vice president (1965–68) upon his election to the Hall of Fame. He resumed his spring training instruction role with the club in 1978.

Beginning in 1961, he would spend summers at the Ted Williams Baseball Camp in Lakeville, Massachusetts, which he had established in 1958 with his friend Al Cassidy and two other business partners. For eight summers and parts of others after that, he would give hitting clinics and talk baseball at the camp. It was not uncommon to find Williams fishing in the pond at the camp. The area now is owned by the town, and a few of the buildings still stand. In the main lodge, one can still see memorabilia from Williams's playing days.

Williams served as manager of the Washington Senators from 1969 to 1971, then continued with the team when they became the Texas Rangers after the 1971 season. Williams's best season as a manager was in 1969 when he led the expansion Senators to an 86–76 record in the team's only winning season in Washington. He was chosen "Manager of the Year" after that season. Like many great players, Williams became impatient with ordinary athletes' abilities and attitudes, particularly those of pitchers, whom he admitted he never respected. Fellow manager Alvin Dark thought that Williams "was a smart, fearless manager" who helped his hitters perform better. Williams's issue with Washington/Texas, according to Dark, was when the ownership traded away his third baseman and shortstop, making it difficult for the club to be as competitive.

On the subject of pitchers, in Ted's autobiography written with John Underwood, Ted opines regarding Bob Lemon (a sinker-ball specialist) pitching for the Cleveland Indians around 1951: "I have to rate Lemon as one of the very best pitchers I ever faced. His ball was always moving, hard, sinking, fast-breaking. You could never really uhmmmph with Lemon."

Williams was much more successful in fishing. An avid and expert fly fisherman and deep-sea fisherman, he spent many summers after baseball fishing the Miramichi River, in Miramichi, New Brunswick. Williams was named to the International Game Fish Association Hall of Fame in 2000. Williams was also known as an accomplished hunter; he was fond of pigeon-shooting for sport in Fenway Park during his career, on one occasion drawing the ire of the Massachusetts Society for the Prevention of Cruelty to Animals.

Williams reached an extensive deal with Sears, lending his name and talent toward marketing, developing, and endorsing a line of in-house sports equipment—such as the "Ted Williams" edition Gamefisher aluminum boat and 7.5 hp "Ted Williams" edition motor, as well as fishing, hunting, and baseball equipment. Williams continued his involvement in the Jimmy Fund, later losing a brother to leukemia, and spending much of his spare time, effort, and money in support of the cancer organization.

In his later years, Williams became a fixture at autograph shows and card shows after his son (by his third wife), John Henry Williams, took control of his career, becoming his de facto manager. The younger Williams kept his father constantly signing memorabilia as a way to maximize earnings.

One of Williams's final, and most memorable, public appearances was at the 1999 All-Star Game in Boston. Able to walk only a short distance, Williams was brought to the pitcher's mound in a golf cart. He proudly waved his cap to the crowd—a gesture he had never done as a player. Fans responded with a standing ovation that lasted several minutes. At the pitcher's mound he was surrounded by players from both teams, including fellow Red Sox player Nomar Garciaparra, and was assisted by Tony Gwynn in throwing out the first pitch of that year's All-Star Game. Later in the year, he was among the members of the Major League Baseball All-Century Team introduced to the crowd at Turner Field in Atlanta prior to Game 2 of the World Series.

== Personal life ==
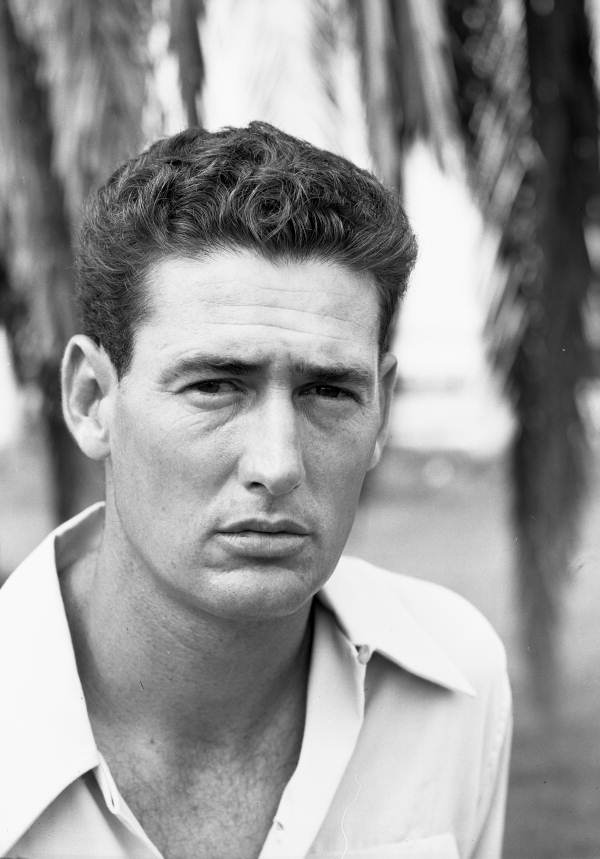
Williams in 1949

On May 4, 1944, Williams married Doris Soule, the daughter of his hunting guide. Their daughter, Barbara Joyce ("Bobby-Jo"), was born on January 28, 1948, while Williams was fishing in Florida. They divorced in 1954. Williams married the socialite model Lee Howard on September 10, 1961, and they were divorced in 1967.

Williams married Dolores Wettach, a former Miss Vermont and Vogue model, in 1968. Their son John-Henry was born on August 27, 1968, followed by daughter Claudia, on October 8, 1971. They were divorced in 1972.

Williams lived with Louise Kaufman for twenty years until her death in 1993. In his book, Cramer called her the love of Williams's life. After his death, her sons filed suit to recover her furniture from Williams's condominium as well as a half-interest in the condominium that they claimed that he gave her.

Williams had a strong respect for General Douglas MacArthur, referring to him as his "idol". For Williams's 40th birthday, MacArthur sent him an oil painting of himself with the inscription "To Ted Williams—not only America's greatest baseball player, but a great American who served his country. Your friend, Douglas MacArthur. General U.S. Army."

Politically, Williams was a Republican, and was described by one biographer as, "to the right of Attila the Hun" except when it came to civil rights. Another writer similarly noted that, while in the 1960s he had a liberal attitude on civil rights, he was far right on other cultural issues of the time, calling him "ultraconservative in the tradition of Barry Goldwater and John Wayne”.

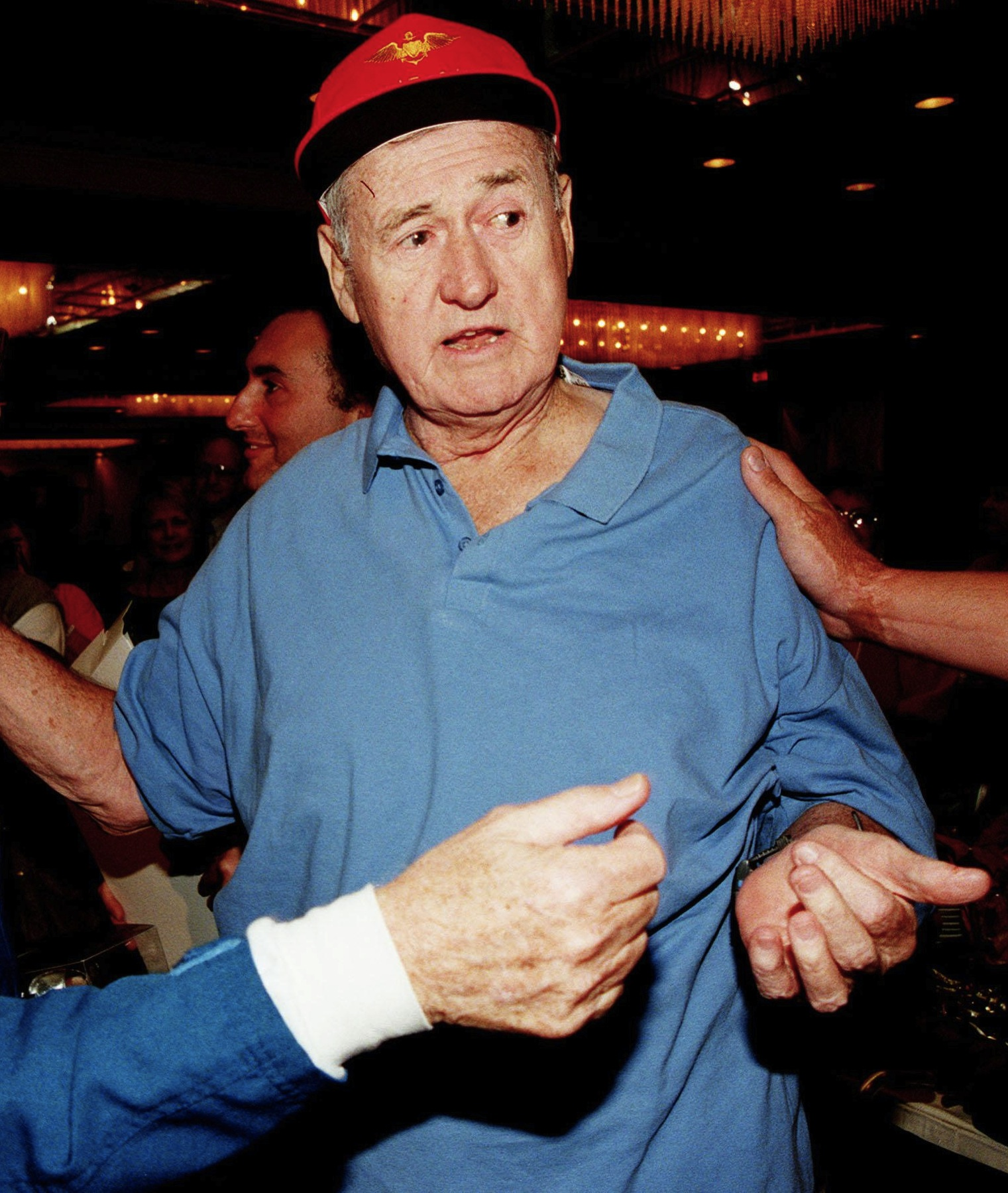
Williams in 1998

Williams campaigned for Richard Nixon in the 1960 United States Presidential Election, and, after Nixon lost to John F. Kennedy, refused several invitations from President Kennedy to gather together in Cape Cod. He supported Nixon again in 1968, and, as manager of the Senators, kept a picture of him on his desk, meeting with the President several times while managing the team. In 1972, he called Nixon, "the greatest president of my lifetime". In the following years, Williams endorsed several other candidates in Republican Party presidential primaries, including George H. W. Bush in 1988 (for whom he also campaigned in New Hampshire), Bob Dole in 1996, and George W. Bush in 2000.

Williams was called an atheist by several biographers, though Williams disproved this in his autobiography by stating that he did believe in God. He was raised in a Christian household but did not publicly emphasize his religious beliefs throughout his life. He often described himself as a spiritual person. His experiences during World War II, particularly his time as a Marine pilot, may have influenced his views on life and faith. In numerous interviews and his autobiography, Williams refers to God and his strained relationship with theism due to his mother's constant work with the church. As quoted in his autobiography My Turn at Bat, Williams stated: "I have a God given talent. God gets you to the plate, but it's up to you what happens when you get there". He concludes his sentiment later with "I'm not a religious man, but I do believe in God. I believe that he has given me a gift, and I try to use it as best I can."

Williams's brother Danny and his son John-Henry both died of leukemia.

== Death ==
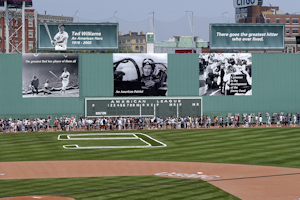
Ted Williams tribute by the Boston Red Sox at Fenway Park on July 22, 2002

In his last years, Williams suffered from cardiomyopathy. He had a pacemaker implanted in November 2000, and he underwent open-heart surgery in January 2001. After suffering a series of strokes and congestive heart failure, he died of cardiac arrest at the age of 83 on July 5, 2002, at Citrus Memorial Hospital, Inverness, Florida, near his home in Citrus Hills, Florida.

Though his will stated his desire to be cremated and have his ashes scattered in the Florida Keys, Williams's son John-Henry and younger daughter Claudia chose to have his remains frozen cryonically.

Ted's elder daughter, Bobby-Jo Ferrell, brought a suit to have her father's wishes recognized. John-Henry's lawyer then produced an informal "family pact" signed by Ted, Claudia, and John-Henry, in which they agreed "to be put into biostasis after we die" to "be able to be together in the future, even if it is only a chance." Bobby-Jo and her attorney, Spike Fitzpatrick (former attorney of Ted Williams), contended that the family pact, which was scribbled on an ink-stained napkin, was forged by John-Henry and/or Claudia. Fitzpatrick and Ferrell believed that the signature was not obtained legally. Laboratory analysis proved that the signature was genuine. John-Henry said that his father was a believer in science and was willing to try cryonics if it held the possibility of reuniting the family.

Though the family pact upset some friends, family and fans, a public plea for financial support of the lawsuit by Ferrell produced little result. Citing financial difficulties, Ferrell dropped her lawsuit on the condition that a $645,000 trust fund left by Williams would immediately pay the sum out equally to the three children.

In Ted Williams: The Biography of an American Hero, author Leigh Montville claims that the family cryonics pact was a practice Ted Williams autograph on a plain piece of paper, around which the agreement had later been handwritten. The pact document was signed "Ted Williams", the same as his autographs, whereas he would always sign his legal documents "Theodore Williams", according to Montville. However, his daughter Claudia who was part of the pact with John-Henry, testified to the authenticity of the document in an affidavit.

Williams's body was subsequently decapitated for the neuropreservation option from Alcor. Following John-Henry's unexpected illness and death from acute myeloid leukemia on March 6, 2004, his body was also transported to Alcor, in fulfillment of the family agreement.

== Awards and recognition ==
Williams was named The Sporting News MLB Player of the Year in 1941, 1942, 1947, 1949, and 1957, and was honored as the Associated Press Athlete of the Year in 1957.

In 1954, Williams was inducted by the San Diego Hall of Champions into the Breitbard Hall of Fame, which honors San Diego's finest athletes both on and off the playing surface. In 2002, he was elected to the Hispanic Heritage Baseball Museum Hall of Fame.

In 1999, Williams was ranked as number 8 on The Sporting News list of the 100 Greatest Baseball Players, where he was the highest-ranking left fielder. That same year, he was one of 30 players elected to the Major League Baseball All-Century Team. In 2020, The Athletic ranked Williams at number 6 on its "Baseball 100" list, complied by sportswriter Joe Posnanski. In 2022, as part of their SN Rushmore project, The Sporting News named Williams on their "Boston Mount Rushmore of Sports", along Boston Celtics basketball player Bill Russell, Boston Bruins hockey player Bobby Orr, and New England Patriots football player Tom Brady.

Williams was inducted into the Baseball Hall of Fame on July 25, 1966. In his induction speech, Williams included a statement calling for the recognition of the great Negro leagues players: "I've been a very lucky guy to have worn a baseball uniform, and I hope some day the names of Satchel Paige and Josh Gibson in some way can be added as a symbol of the great Negro players who are not here only because they weren't given a chance." Williams was referring to two of the most famous names in the Negro Leagues, who were not given the opportunity to play in the Major Leagues before Jackie Robinson broke the color barrier in 1947. Gibson died early in 1947 and thus never played in the majors; and Paige's brief major league stint came long past his prime as a player. This statement from the Hall of Fame podium was "a first crack in the door that ultimately would open and include Paige and Gibson and other Negro league stars in the shrine." Paige was the first inducted in 1971. Gibson and others followed, starting in 1972 and continued on and off into the 21st century.

On November 18, 1991, President George H. W. Bush presented Williams with the Presidential Medal of Freedom, the highest civilian award in the United States. Following his retirement Harvard University offered Williams an honorary degree on multiple occasions. However, he refused every time, feeling as if he never belonged in a place with such educated people. An avid fisherman Williams was inducted into the IGFA Fishing Hall of Fame in 1999, and the Catskill Fly Fishing Hall of Fame in 2021.

The Ted Williams Tunnel in Boston, Massachusetts, carrying 1.6 miles (2.6 km) of the final 2.3 miles (3.7 km) of Interstate 90 under Boston Harbor, opened in December 1995, and Ted Williams Parkway (California State Route 56) in San Diego County, California, opened in 1992, were named in his honor while he was still alive. In 2016, the major league San Diego Padres inducted Williams into their hall of fame for his contributions to baseball in San Diego.

In 2002, the U.S. Marines began giving out the annual "Ted Williams Globe & Anchor Award." The honor is given out to a non-Marine who has shown commitment and dedication to excellence, as well as the hard work and guts.

Outside Fenway Park, there are two statues honoring Williams. The first was unveiled in 2004, depicting him placing his cap on the head of a young boy. The second was The Teammates statue, unveiled in 2010, where he is depicted alongside teammates and friends Bobby Doerr, Dom DiMaggio, and Johnny Pesky.

The Tampa Bay Rays home field, Tropicana Field, installed the Ted Williams Museum (formerly in Hernando, Florida, 1994–2006) behind the left field fence. From the Tampa Bay Rays website: "The Ted Williams Museum and Hitters Hall of Fame brings a special element to the Tropicana Field. Fans can view an array of different artifacts and pictures of the 'Greatest hitter that ever lived.' These memorable displays range from Ted Williams' days in the military through his professional playing career. This museum is dedicated to some of the greatest players to ever 'lace 'em up,' including Willie Mays, Joe DiMaggio, Mickey Mantle, Roger Maris."

In 2013, the Bob Feller Act of Valor Award honored Williams as one of 37 Baseball Hall of Fame members for his service in the United States Marine Corps during World War II.

== Military and civilian decorations and awards ==
Williams received the following decorations and awards:

Naval Aviator insignia
| 1st row | Air Medal with two 5/16" Gold Stars | Navy Unit Commendation | Presidential Medal of Freedom |
| 2nd row | American Campaign Medal | Asiatic–Pacific Campaign Medal with one 3/16" bronze star | World War II Victory Medal |
| 3rd row | Navy Occupation Service Medal | National Defense Service Medal | Korean Service Medal with two 3/16" bronze stars |
| 4th row | Republic of Korea Presidential Unit Citation | United Nations Service Medal | Republic of Korea War Service Medal |

== See also ==
- DHL Hometown Heroes
- Major League Baseball titles leaders
- Major League Baseball Triple Crown
- List of Major League Baseball annual home run leaders
- List of Major League Baseball annual runs scored leaders
- List of Major League Baseball annual doubles leaders
- List of Major League Baseball batting champions
- List of Major League Baseball career bases on balls leaders
- List of Major League Baseball career doubles leaders
- List of Major League Baseball career home run leaders
- List of Major League Baseball career hits leaders
- List of Major League Baseball career on-base percentage leaders
- List of Major League Baseball career OPS leaders
- List of Major League Baseball career runs scored leaders
- List of Major League Baseball career runs batted in leaders
- List of Major League Baseball career times on base leaders
- List of Major League Baseball career total bases leaders
- List of Major League Baseball individual streaks
- List of Major League Baseball players to hit for the cycle
- List of Major League Baseball players who played in four decades
- List of Major League Baseball players who spent their entire career with one franchise

== Notes ==
Awards and achievements
| Preceded by Lou Gehrig | American League Triple Crown Winner; 1942 and 1947 | Succeeded by Mickey Mantle |
| Preceded by Mickey Vernon | Hitting for the cycle July 21, 1946 | Succeeded by Bobby Doerr |
