= Bobby Doerr =

American baseball player (1918–2017)

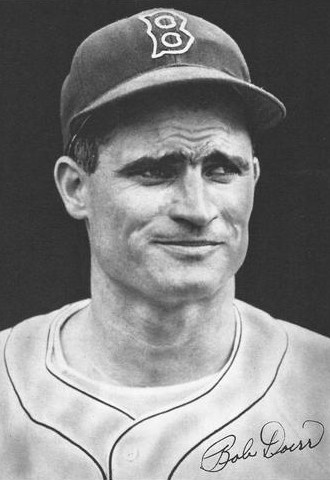
- Doerr, circa 1947
- Second baseman
- Born: April 7, 1918; Los Angeles, California, U.S.
- Died: November 13, 2017 (aged 99); Junction City, Oregon, U.S.
- Batted: Right Threw: Right

MLB debut
- April 20, 1937, for the Boston Red Sox

Last MLB appearance
- September 7, 1951, for the Boston Red Sox

MLB statistics
- Batting average: .288
- Hits: 2,042
- Home runs: 223
- Runs batted in: 1,247
- Stats at Baseball Reference

Teams
- Boston Red Sox (1937–1944, 1946–1951)

Career highlights and awards
- 9× All-Star (1941–1944, 1946–1948, 1950, 1951); Boston Red Sox No. 1 retired; Boston Red Sox Hall of Fame

Member of the National

Baseball Hall of Fame
- Induction: 1986
- Election method: Veterans Committee

Robert Pershing Doerr (April 7, 1918 – November 13, 2017) was an American professional baseball second baseman and coach. He played his entire 14-year Major League Baseball (MLB) career for the Boston Red Sox (1937–1951). A nine-time MLB All-Star, Doerr batted over .300 three times, drove in more than 100 runs six times, and set Red Sox team records in several statistical categories despite missing one season due to military service during World War II. He was inducted into the Baseball Hall of Fame in 1986.

After he retired as a player, Doerr served as a scout and a coach; he worked with Carl Yastrzemski before his Triple Crown season. From April 25, 2017, until his death on November 13 of that year, Doerr was the oldest living former major league player. He was the last living person who played in the major leagues in the 1930s, and was the oldest of only three living people who made their MLB debut before U.S. involvement in World War II (the other two being Chuck Stevens and Fred Caligiuri).

== Early life ==
Doerr was the son of Harold Doerr, a telephone company supervisor, and his wife, the former Frances Herrnberger; his middle name was a tribute to General of the Armies John J. Pershing, then the commander of U.S. military forces in World War I.

He graduated from Los Angeles' Fremont High School in 1936, and by then, had already begun his professional career with the 1934 and 1935 Hollywood Stars of the Pacific Coast League (PCL).

While playing for the San Diego Padres of the PCL in 1936, Doerr met Ted Williams. The future Red Sox teammates became close friends for many years. Doerr played in 175 games for San Diego that year, batting .342. He led the league with 238 hits, including 37 doubles and 12 triples.

== MLB playing career ==
=== Early career ===
Doerr broke into the majors in 1937 at the age of 19 and went 3-for-5 in his first game. In 1938, he became a regular in the Red Sox lineup. Doerr led the league with 22 sacrifice hits in 1938. In 1939, Doerr began a string of 12 consecutive seasons with 10 or more home runs and 73 or more runs batted in (RBIs); in 1940 the Red Sox became the 12th team in major league history to have four players with 100 RBIs, with Foxx, Williams, Cronin and Doerr each collecting at least 105.

=== All-Star seasons and the World Series ===
In 1941, Doerr was an All-Star, the first of nine times he was selected for the AL All-Star team. In 1944, Doerr led the league in slugging percentage. The same year, his .325 batting average was good enough to allow him to finish second in the league, two percentage points behind Lou Boudreau of the Cleveland Indians. The Sporting News named him Most Valuable Player for the American League (AL), although he finished only seventh in Major League Baseball Most Valuable Player Award voting for the AL. Doerr hit for the cycle twice in his career; on May 17, 1944, in a 12–8 loss to the St. Louis Browns in the second game of a doubleheader, and again on May 13, 1947, in a 19–6 win over the Chicago White Sox.

Doerr missed the 1945 season while serving in the Army during World War II, being stationed at Camp Roberts, California. In 1946, Doerr finished third in MVP voting for the AL (won by Williams, his teammate). Doerr drove in 116 runs despite a .271 average. He hit .409 in the 1946 World Series loss to the St. Louis Cardinals, with a home run and three RBIs. Doerr's average dropped to .258 in 1947 as he grounded into a league-high 25 double plays, but he had 95 RBIs. He hit .285 with 27 home runs and 111 RBIs in 1948. Doerr had set an AL record in that year by handling 414 chances in a row over 73 games without an error.

=== Final years as a player ===
In 1949, Doerr hit .309 with 18 home runs and 109 RBIs. At the start of the 1950 season, Doerr was in a slump; he was only batting .232 as of June 2. However, he finished the year with a league-leading 11 triples, and batted .294. On June 8 of that year, he hit three home runs in a 29–4 romp over the Browns. He set career highs that year in triples, runs (103) and RBIs (120); he tied his career high in home runs (27). Doerr appeared in only 106 games in 1951 and he retired that September after suffering from a spinal problem for two years.

=== Career totals ===
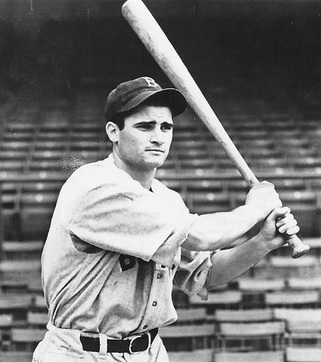
Doerr, circa 1939

Doerr retired with 8,028 plate appearances, 1,094 runs, 89 triples, 809 walks, 1,349 singles, 1,184 runs created, 693 extra base hits, 2,862 times on base, 115 sacrifice hits and nine All-Star Game selections. At Fenway Park, he hit .315 with 145 home runs, compared to a .261 average and 78 HR on the road. Doerr batted over .300 three times, with six seasons of at least 100 RBIs. He never played a game at a position other than second base.

Regarded as one of the top defensive second basemen of his era, Doerr led AL second basemen in double plays five times, tying a league record, in putouts and fielding percentage four times each, and in assists three times. Doerr held the major league record for career double plays at second base (1,507) until 1963.

He set Red Sox records for career games (1,865), at bats (7,093), hits (2,042), doubles (381), total bases (3,270) and RBIs (1,247), All of Doerr's offensive Red Sox records were later broken by Williams, who referred to Doerr as "the silent captain of the Red Sox." His 223 home runs were then the third most by a major league second baseman.

== Later MLB career ==
After spending a few years as a cattle rancher in Oregon, Doerr returned to baseball. He became a scout for the Red Sox from 1957 to 1966, also serving as a minor league hitting instructor for the team for the last six seasons of that span. He was hired as the first base coach for the Red Sox in 1967 under new manager Dick Williams. The Red Sox won their first pennant in 20 years and played in the 1967 World Series.

Doerr resigned from the Red Sox when Williams was fired as manager in September 1969. He was the hitting coach for the expansion Toronto Blue Jays from 1977 to 1981.

== Later life ==
Bobby Doerr's number 1 was retired by the Boston Red Sox in 1988.

Doerr lived in Oregon from the late 1930s until his death, residing in the vicinity of Agness for much of his career before relocating to Junction City in the mid 1950s. Doerr was married to Monica Terpin from October 1938 until her death in 2003; she had lived with multiple sclerosis since the 1940s. They had one son.

He was inducted into the Baseball Hall of Fame in 1986. His jersey number 1 was retired by the Red Sox on May 21, 1988. He made annual trips to the Hall of Fame induction at Cooperstown, New York until 2008, after which he stopped attending. On July 29, 2007, the Hall of Fame honored Doerr after the induction of Cal Ripken Jr. and Tony Gwynn. Reflecting on being inducted into the Hall of Fame and having his number retired by the Red Sox, Doerr said, "If I had played on a world champion, that would have made my life complete."

On August 2, 2007, the Red Sox held "Bobby Doerr Day" at Fenway Park where he rode along the warning track in a car, threw out the first pitch, and gave a speech. Doerr had what was characterized as a minor stroke on August 11, 2011. He attended the Fenway Park 100th anniversary celebration on April 20, 2012.

Alongside teammates Ted Williams, Dom DiMaggio, and Johnny Pesky, Doerr was honored with The Teammates statue outside Fenway Park. It was unveiled in 2010.

=== Longevity and records ===
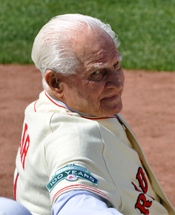
Doerr at Fenway Park's 100th anniversary in 2012

Upon the death of former New York Yankees executive and American League president Lee MacPhail in November 2012, Doerr became the oldest living member of the Baseball Hall of Fame. He became the oldest living former Red Sox player upon the death of Lou Lucier in October 2014. On November 4, 2016, Doerr became the oldest living former major leaguer upon the death of Eddie Carnett.

Doerr was the last surviving member of the 1946 Boston Red Sox team that won the AL pennant and lost the World Series in seven games to the St. Louis Cardinals. He was also the last living person who played in the major leagues during the 1930s, and the last living person who played against Lou Gehrig.

=== Death ===
Doerr died on November 13, 2017, in Junction City, Oregon, at the age of 99.

== Awards ==
- The Sporting News Most Valuable Player for the American League (1944)
- The Sporting News Major League All-Star Team (1944, 1946)
- Uniform number retired by the Boston Red Sox (1988)
- In 2013, the Bob Feller Act of Valor Award honored Doerr as one of 37 Baseball Hall of Fame members for his service in the United States Army during World War II.

== See also ==
- Boston Red Sox Hall of Fame
- List of Major League Baseball career home run leaders
- List of Major League Baseball career hits leaders
- List of Major League Baseball career runs scored leaders
- List of Major League Baseball career runs batted in leaders
- List of Major League Baseball annual triples leaders
- List of Major League Baseball players to hit for the cycle
- List of Major League Baseball players who spent their entire career with one franchise

Sporting positions
Preceded by Pete Runnels	Boston Red Sox first-base coach 1967–1969	Succeeded by Don Lenhardt
Achievements
Preceded by Leon Culberson; Ted Williams	Hitting for the cycle May 17, 1944; May 13, 1947	Succeeded by Bob Johnson; Vic Wertz
Records
Preceded by Eddie Carnett	Oldest recognized verified living baseball player November 4, 2016 – November 13, 2017	Succeeded by Chuck Stevens
