= Fenway Park =

Baseball stadium in Boston, Massachusetts

- America's Most Beloved Ballpark; Friendly Fenway

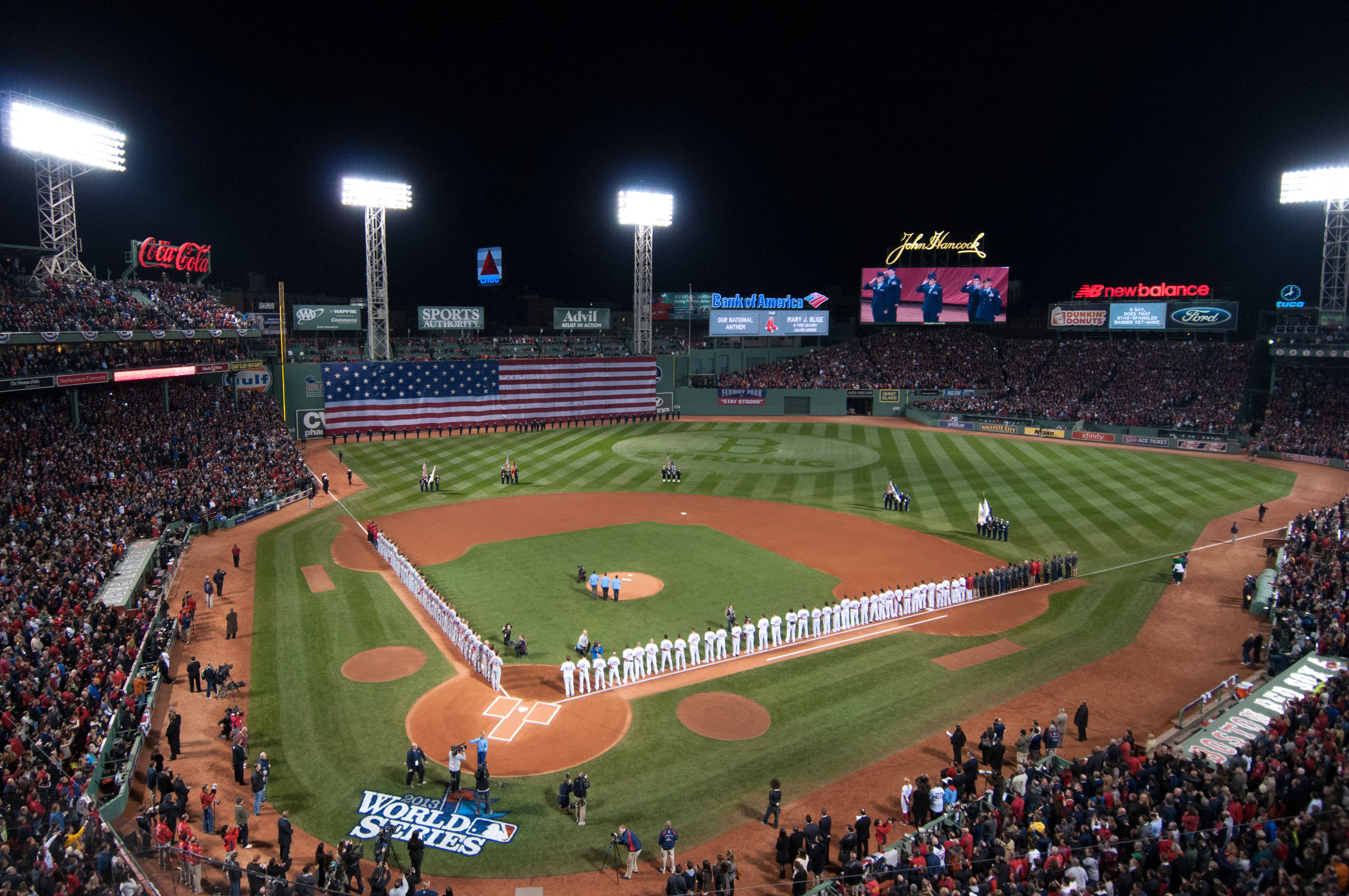
- Fenway Park during the 2013 World Series

- Location in Boston Location in Massachusetts Location in the United States
- Address: 4 Jersey Street
- Location: Boston, Massachusetts, U.S.
- Coordinates: 42°20′47″N 71°5′52″W
- Owner: Fenway Sports Group
- Operator: Fenway Sports Group / Boston Red Sox
- Capacity: 37,305 (day); 37,755 (night)
- Surface: Kentucky Blue Grass
- Record attendance: 47,627 (September 22, 1935)
- Field size: Left Field: 310 ft (94.5 m); Deep Left-Center: 379 ft (115.5 m); Center Field: 389 ft 9 in (118.8 m); Deep Right-Center: 420 ft (128 m); Right Center: 380 ft (115.8 m); Right Field: 302 ft (92 m); Backstop: 60 ft (18.3 m)
- Public transit: Framingham/Worcester Line at Lansdowne; Green Line at Kenmore and Fenway

Construction
- Groundbreaking: September 25, 1911
- Opened: April 20, 1912
- Renovated: 1988, 2002–2011, 2017
- Expanded: 1934, 1946, 2002–2011, 2017, 2022
- Cost: US$650,000 ($21.7 million in 2025 dollars)
- Architect: James E. McLaughlin
- Structural engineer: Osborn Engineering Corp.
- General contractors: Charles Logue Building Company, Coleman Brothers, Inc.

Tenants
- Boston Red Sox (MLB) (1912–present); Boston Braves (MLB) (1914–1915); Boston Bulldogs (AFL) (1926); Boston Redskins (NFL) (1933–1936); Boston Shamrocks (AFL) (1936–1937); Boston Yanks (NFL) (1944–1948); Boston Patriots (AFL) (1963–1968); Boston Beacons (NASL) (1968); Fenway Bowl (NCAA) (2022–present)

Website
- mlb.com/redsox/ballpark
- Fenway Park
- U.S. National Register of Historic Places
- NRHP reference No.: 12000069
- Added to NRHP: March 7, 2012

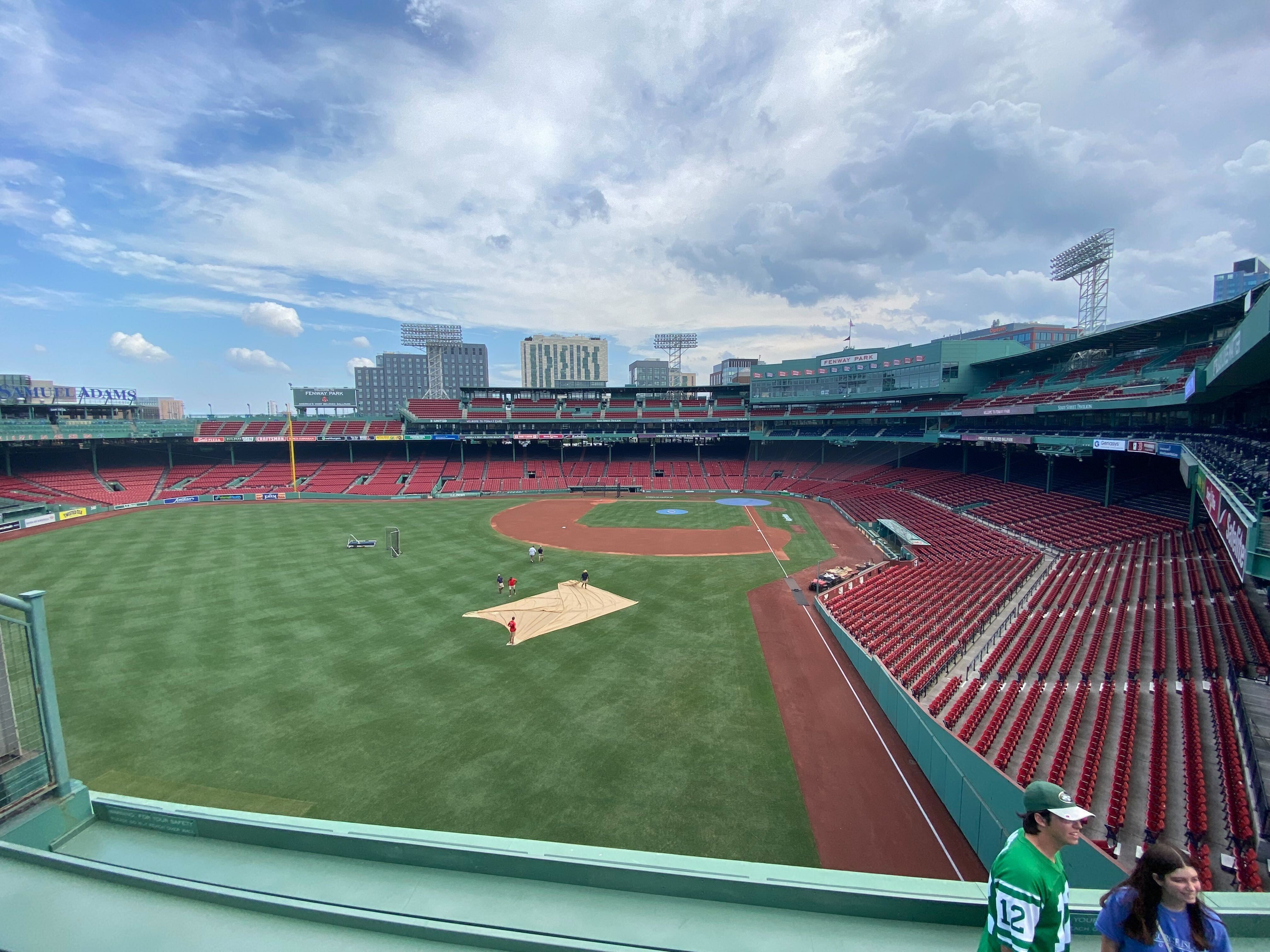
View of Fenway Park from atop the Green Monster

Fenway Park is a ballpark in Boston, Massachusetts, United States, close to Kenmore Square. Since 1912, it has been the home field of Major League Baseball's (MLB) Boston Red Sox. While the stadium was built in 1912, it was substantially rebuilt in 1934, and underwent major renovations and modifications in the 21st century. It is the oldest active ballpark in MLB. Because of its age and constrained location in Boston's dense Fenway–Kenmore neighborhood, the park has many quirky features, including "The Triangle", Pesky's Pole, and the Green Monster in left field. It is the fifth-smallest among MLB ballparks by seating capacity, second-smallest by total capacity, and one of nine that cannot accommodate at least 40,000 spectators.

Fenway Park has hosted the World Series 11 times, with the Red Sox winning six of them and the Boston Braves winning one. (Note: The first was in 1912, the park's inaugural season (defeated the New York Giants), 1914 (Braves defeated the Philadelphia Athletics), 1918 (defeated the Chicago Cubs), 1946 (lost to the St. Louis Cardinals), 1967 (lost to the St. Louis Cardinals), 1975 (lost to the Cincinnati Reds), 1986 (lost to the New York Mets), 2004 (defeated the St. Louis Cardinals), 2007 (defeated the Colorado Rockies), 2013 (defeated the St. Louis Cardinals) and 2018 (defeated the Los Angeles Dodgers).) Besides baseball games, it has also been the site of many other sporting and cultural events including professional football games for the Boston Redskins, Boston Yanks, and the Boston Patriots; concerts; soccer and hockey games (including the NHL Winter Classic in both 2010 and 2023); and political and religious campaigns.

On March 7, 2012 (Fenway Park's centennial year), the park was added to the National Register of Historic Places. It is a landmark at the end of the Boston Irish heritage trail. Former pitcher Bill Lee has called Fenway Park "a shrine". It is a pending Boston Landmark, which will regulate any further changes to the park. The ballpark is considered to be one of the most well-known sports venues in the world and a symbol of Boston.

== History ==
In 1911, while the Red Sox were still playing on Huntington Avenue Grounds, owner John I. Taylor purchased the land bordered by Brookline Avenue, Jersey Street, Van Ness Street and Lansdowne Street and developed it into a larger baseball stadium known as Fenway Park. Taylor claimed the name Fenway Park came from its location in the Fenway neighborhood of Boston, which was partially created late in the nineteenth century by filling in marshland or "fens", to create the Back Bay Fens urban park. However, given that Taylor's family also owned the Fenway Realty Company, the promotional value of the naming at the time has been cited as well.

Like many classic ballparks, Fenway Park was constructed on an asymmetrical block, with consequent asymmetry in its field dimensions. The park was designed by architect James E. McLaughlin, and the General Contractor was the Charles Logue Building Company.

The first game was played April 20, 1912, with Mayor of Boston John F. Fitzgerald throwing out the first pitch and Boston defeating the New York Highlanders, 7–6 in 11 innings. Newspaper coverage of the opening was overshadowed by continuing coverage of the Titanic sinking five days earlier.

In June 1919, a rally supporting Irish Independence turned out nearly 50,000 supporters to see the president of the Irish Republic, Éamon de Valera, and was allegedly the largest crowd ever in the ballpark.

The park's address was originally 24 Jersey Street. In 1977, the section of Jersey Street nearest the park was renamed Yawkey Way in honor of longtime Red Sox owner Tom Yawkey, and the park's address was 4 Yawkey Way until 2018, when the street's name was reverted to Jersey Street in light of current Red Sox ownership distancing itself from Yawkey due to his history of racism (the Red Sox were the last team in Major League Baseball to integrate). The address is now 4 Jersey Street.

=== Changes to Fenway Park ===
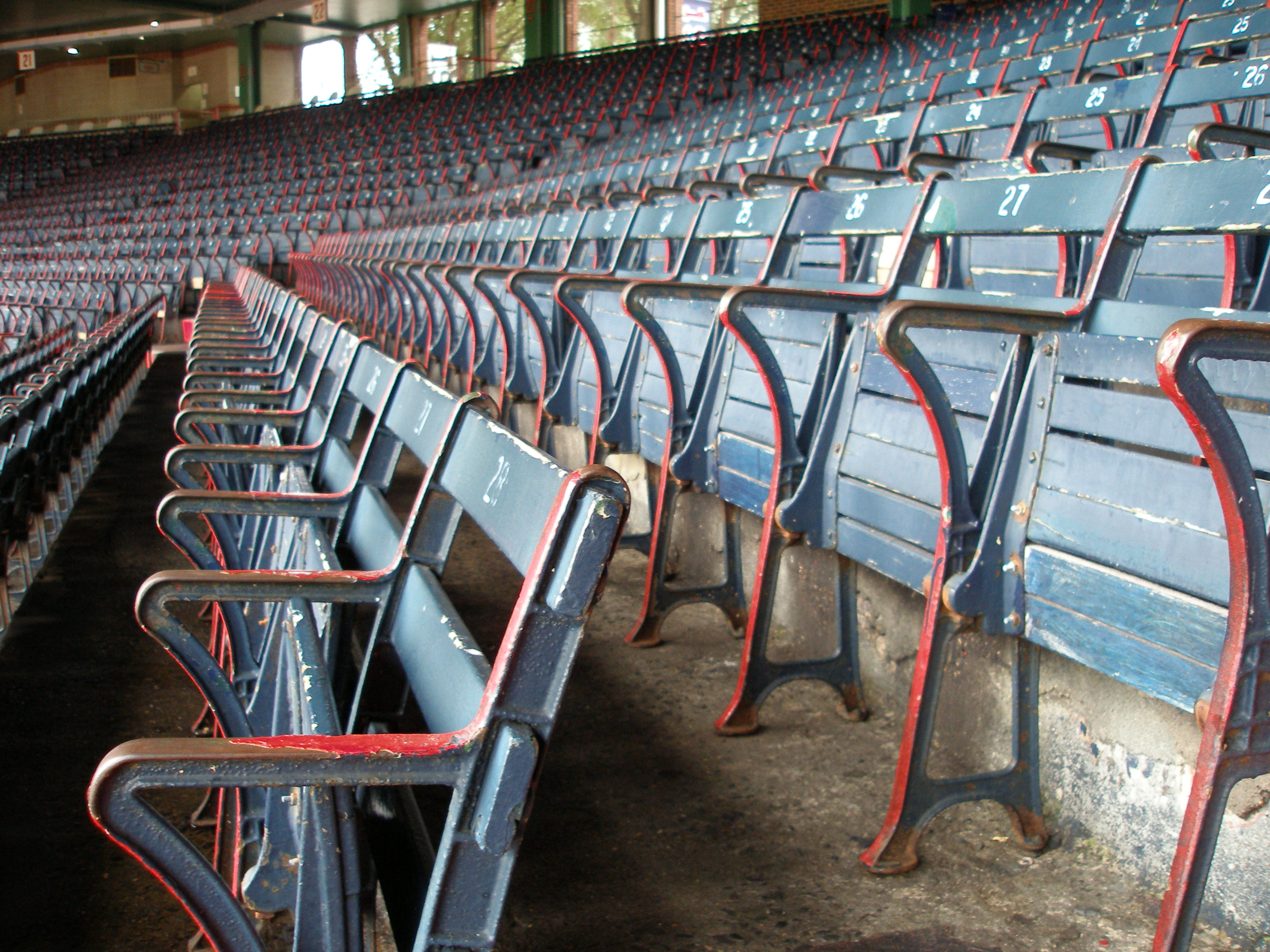
The old wooden seats of Fenway's Grandstand section

Some of the changes include:

- In 1926, a fire burned down Fenway Park's left field bleachers, which were left in their empty and burned state until 1933.
- In 1933, a significant reconstruction of Fenway Park began after Tom Yawkey purchased the Red Sox and Fenway Park.
  - Duffy's Cliff was leveled and no longer existed, with work started on what eventually became known as the Green Monster.
  - Two wooden bleacher sections were reconstructed.
  - Multiple areas of the park were renovated or were new additions, including concessions, employee rooms, the press box, and the entrance to the team offices on Jersey Street.
- By Opening Day 1934, the newly renovated Fenway Park had assumed the basic appearance, color (Dartmouth Green), and layout that exists to present day:
  - A large fire caused significant damage to new seating areas in left field and center field bleachers. These areas were reconstructed before opening day 1934.
  - 7,000 new seats were added
  - The Green Monster was completed at 37-feet high, replacing the 10 foot tall Duffy's Cliff and the original 25 foot wall.
  - A hand-operated scoreboard was added, with (what was then considered cutting-edge technology) lights to indicate balls and strikes. The scoreboard is still updated by hand today from behind the wall. The National League scores were removed in 1976, but restored in 2003 and still require manual updates from on the field.
  - Home run and foul distances were significantly altered:
    - From 320 feet to 312 in left
    - 468 feet to 420 in center
    - 358 feet to 334 in right
    - distance to the backstop was shortened from 68 feet to 60 feet
- In 1946, the first upper deck seats were installed.
- In 1947, arc lights were installed at Fenway Park. The Boston Red Sox were the third-to-last team out of 16 major league teams to have lights in their home park.
- In 1976, metric distances were added to the conventionally stated distances because it was thought at the time that the United States would adopt the metric system. As of 2022, only Miami's LoanDepot Park and Toronto's Rogers Centre list metric distances. Fenway Park retained the metric measurements until mid-season 2002, when they were painted over. Also, Fenway's first electronic message board was added over the center field bleachers.
- In 1988, a glass-protected seating area behind home plate named The 600 Club was built. After Ted Williams' death in 2002, it was renamed the .406 Club in honor of his 1941 season in which he produced a .406 batting average. The section was renamed again in 2006 to the EMC Club.
- In 1993 the public restrooms were renovated and the original trough urinals were removed from the men's rooms.
- In 1999 the auxiliary press boxes were added on top of the roof boxes along the first and third base sides of the field.
- In 2000, a new video display from Daktronics, measuring 23 feet (7.0 m) high by 30 feet (9.1 m) wide, was added in center field.
- Before the 2003 season, seats were added atop the Green Monster.
- Before the 2004 season, seats were added to the right field roof, above the grandstand, called the Budweiser Right Field Roof. In December 2017 Samuel Adams renamed the deck the "Sam Deck."
- Before the 2008 season, the Coke bottles, installed in 1997, were removed to return the light towers to their original state. The temporary luxury boxes installed for the 1999 All-Star Game were removed and permanent ones were added to the State Street Pavilion level. Seats were also added down the left field line called the Coca-Cola Party-Deck.
- Before the 2011 season, three new scoreboards beyond right-center field were installed: a 38 ft × 100 ft (12 m × 30 m) scoreboard in right-center field, a 17 ft × 100 ft (5.2 m × 30.5 m) video screen in center field, a 16 ft × 30 ft (4.9 m × 9.1 m) video board in right field, along with a new video control room. The Gate D concourse has undergone a complete remodel with new concession stands and improved pedestrian flow. The wooden grandstand seats were all removed to allow the completion of the waterproofing of the seating bowl and completely refurbished upon re-installation.

=== New Fenway Park ===
On May 15, 1999, then-Red Sox CEO John Harrington announced plans for a new Fenway Park to be built near the existing structure. It was to have seated 44,130 and would have been a modernized replica of the current Fenway Park, with the same field dimensions except for a shorter right field and reduced foul territory. Some sections of the existing ballpark were to be preserved (mainly the original Green Monster and the third base side of the park) as part of the overall new layout. Most of the current stadium was to be demolished to make room for new development, with one section remaining to house a baseball museum and public park. The proposal was highly controversial; it projected that the park had less than 15 years of usable life, would require hundreds of millions of dollars of public investment, and was later revealed to be part of a scheme by current ownership to increase the marketable value of the team as they were ready to sell. Several groups (such as "Save Fenway Park") formed in an attempt to block the move.

A significant renovation of Fenway Park stretched over a 10-year period beginning around 2002 headed by Janet Marie Smith, then vice president of planning and development for the Sox. The Boston Globe has described Smith as "the architect credited with saving Fenway Park." At completion of the renovations, it was reported that Fenway Park remains usable until as late as 2062.

== Capacity and sellout streak ==
Fenway's capacity differs between day and night games because, during day games, the seats in center field (Section 35) are covered with a black tarp to provide a batter's eye.

Fenway's lowest attendance was recorded on October 1, 1964, when a game against the Cleveland Indians drew only 306 paid spectators.

On May 15, 2003, the Red Sox game against the Texas Rangers sold out, beginning a sellout streak that lasted until 2013. On September 8, 2008, when the Red Sox hosted the Tampa Bay Rays, Fenway Park broke the all-time Major League record for consecutive sellouts with 456, surpassing the record previously held by Jacobs Field in Cleveland. On June 17, 2009, the park celebrated its 500th consecutive Red Sox sellout. According to WBZ, the team joined three NBA teams which achieved 500 consecutive home sellouts. The sellout streak ended on April 10, 2013 (with an attendance of 30,862) after the Red Sox sold out 794 regular season games and an additional 26 postseason games.

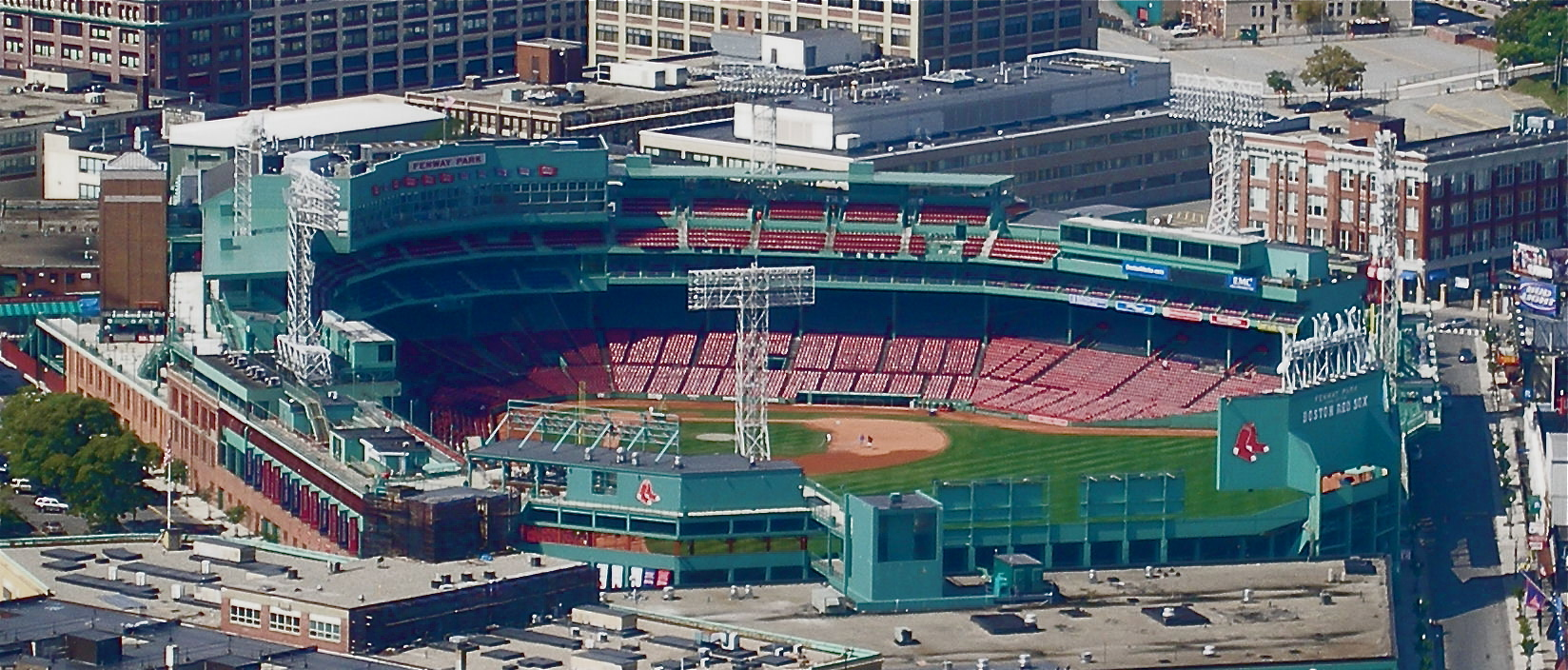
A view of Fenway Park and the surrounding neighborhood, as seen from the Prudential Tower

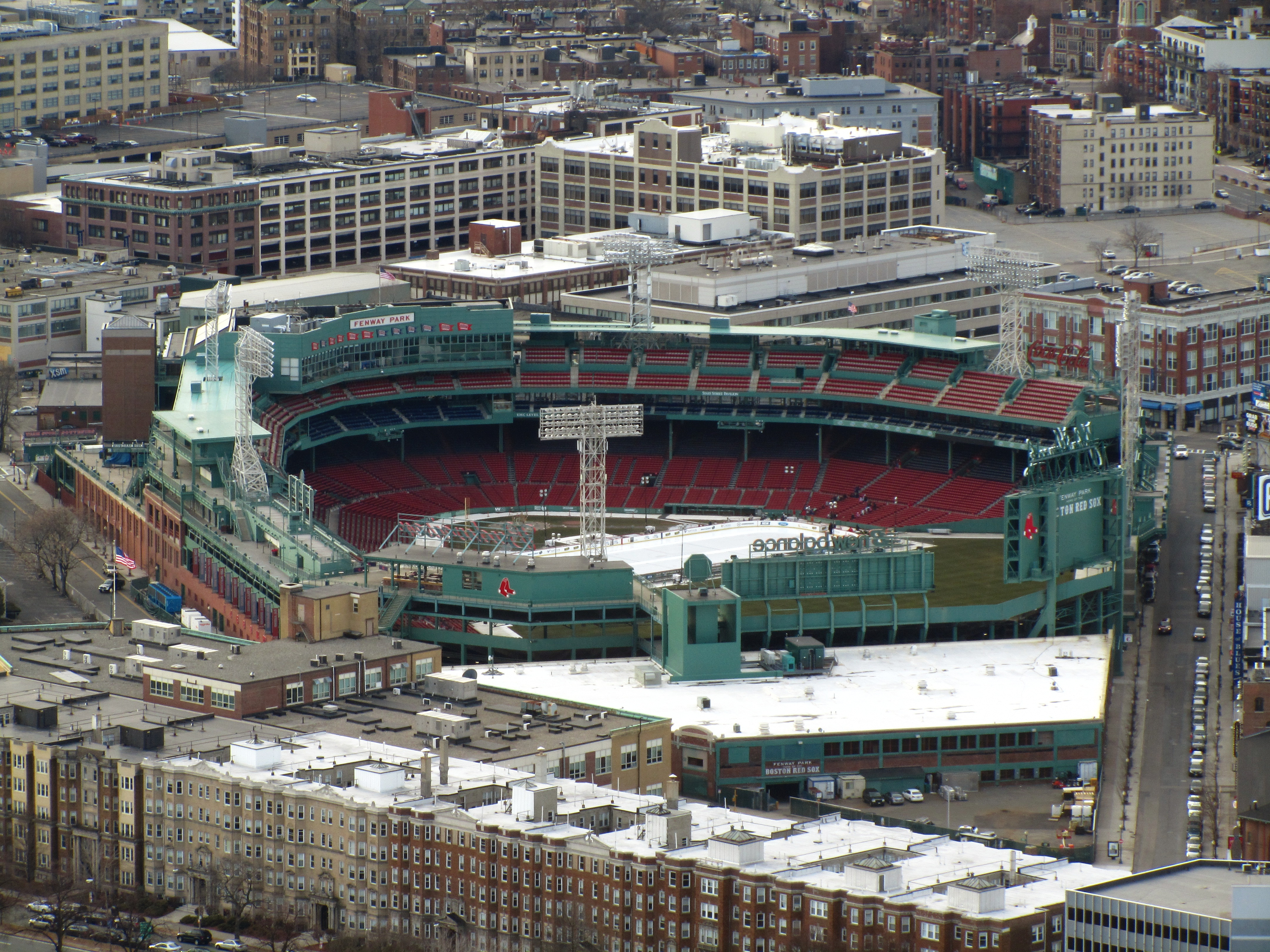
Fenway in 2012, with additions to the left field grandstand

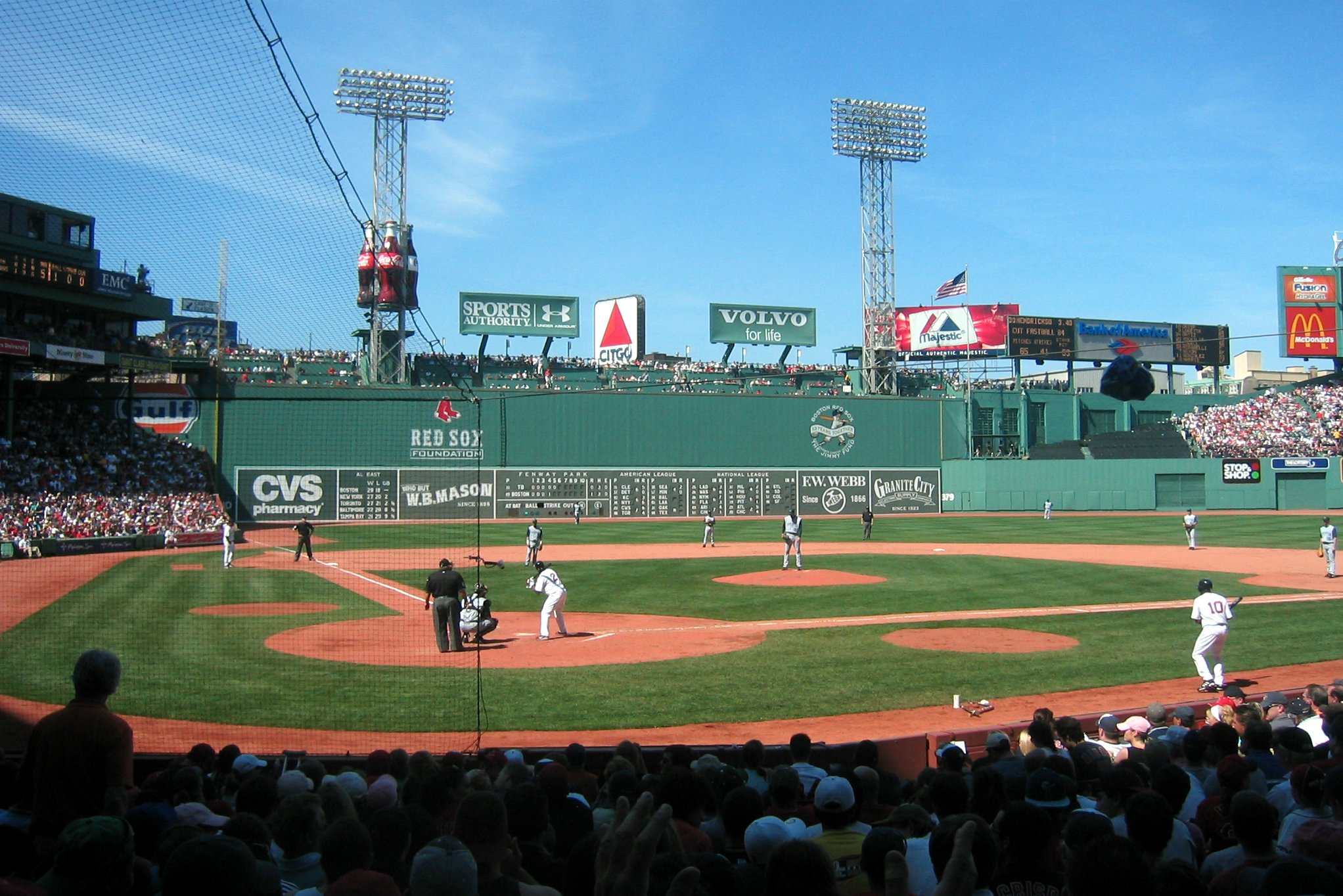
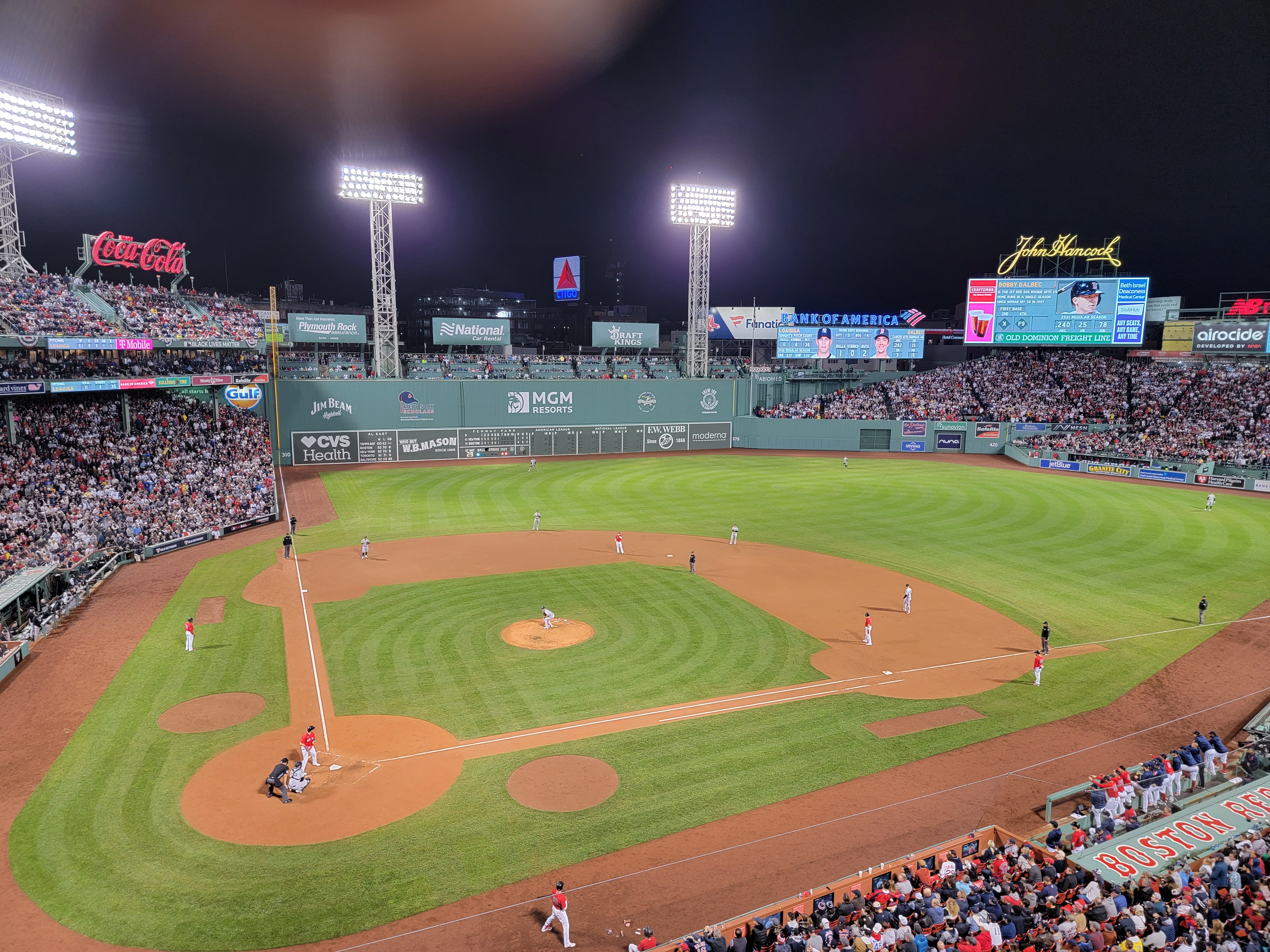
Fenway Park's center field seats on day games (top) are tarped off due to the Batter's eye, and are only sold during night games (bottom).

Year(s)	Seating Capacity		Year(s)	Seating Capacity	
Year(s)	Day	Night	Year(s)	Day	Night
1912–1932	27,000		1993–1994	34,218	
1933–1946	33,817		1995–2000	33,455	33,871
1947–1948	35,500		2001–2002	33,577	33,993
1949–1952	35,200		2003	34,482	34,898
1953–1957	34,824		2004–2005	34,679	35,095
1958–1959	34,819		2006	35,692	36,108
1960	33,368		2007	36,109	36,525
1961–1964	33,357		2008	36,945	37,373
1965–1967	33,524		2009	36,984	37,400
1968–1970	33,375		2010	36,986	37,402
1971–1975	33,379		2011	37,065	37,493
1976	33,437		2012	37,067	37,495
1977–1978	33,513		2013–2014	37,071	37,499
1979–1980	33,538		2015	37,227	37,673
1981–1982	33,536		2016	37,497	37,949
1983–1984	33,465		2017	37,281	37,731
1985–1988	33,583		2018–2021	37,305	37,755
1989–1990	34,182		2022	37,085	37,535
1991	34,171		2023–present	37,105	37,555
1992	33,925				
Unless noted otherwise, all capacity figures are from Green Cathedrals: The Ultimate Celebrations of All 273 Major League and Negro League Ballparks Past and Present by Philip Lowry

== Features ==
The park is located along Lansdowne Street and Jersey Street in the Kenmore Square area of Boston. The area includes many buildings of similar height and architecture and thus it blends in with its surroundings. When pitcher Roger Clemens arrived in Boston for the first time in 1984, he took a taxi from Logan Airport and was sure the driver had misunderstood his directions when he announced their arrival at the park. Clemens recalled telling the driver "No, Fenway Park, it's a baseball stadium ... this is a warehouse." Only when the driver told Clemens to look up and he saw the light towers did he realize he was in the right place.

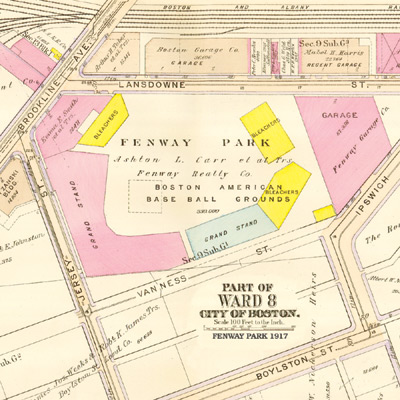
1917 map of Fenway Park

Fenway Park is one of the two remaining jewel box ballparks still in use in Major League Baseball, the other being Wrigley Field; both have a significant number of obstructed view seats, due to pillars supporting the upper deck. These are sold as such, and are a reminder of the architectural limitations of older ballparks.

George Will asserts in his book Men at Work that Fenway Park is a "hitters' ballpark", with its short right-field fence (302 feet), narrow foul ground (the smallest of any current major league park), and generally closer-than-normal outfield fences. By Rule 1.04, Note(a), all parks built after 1958 have been required to have foul lines at least 325 feet (99 m) long and a center-field fence at least 400 feet (120 m) from home plate. (This rule had the unintended consequence of leading to the "Cookie-Cutter Stadium" era, which ended when Oriole Park at Camden Yards in Baltimore opened in 1992.) Regarding the narrow foul territory, Will writes:

The narrow foul territory in Fenway Park probably adds 5 to 7 points onto batting averages. Since World War II, the Red Sox have had 18 batting champions (through 1989)... Five to 7 points are a lot, given that there may be only a 15- or 20-point spread between a good hitting team and a poor hitting team.

Will states that some observers might feel that these unique aspects of Fenway give the Red Sox an advantage over their opponents, given that the Red Sox hitters play 81 games at the home stadium while each opponent plays no more than seven games as visiting teams, but Will does not share this view.

Fenway Park's bullpen wall is much lower than most other outfield walls; outfielders are known to end up flying over this wall when chasing balls hit that direction, such as with Torii Hunter when chasing a David Ortiz game-tying grand slam that direction in game 2 of the 2013 ALCS.

=== The Green Monster ===
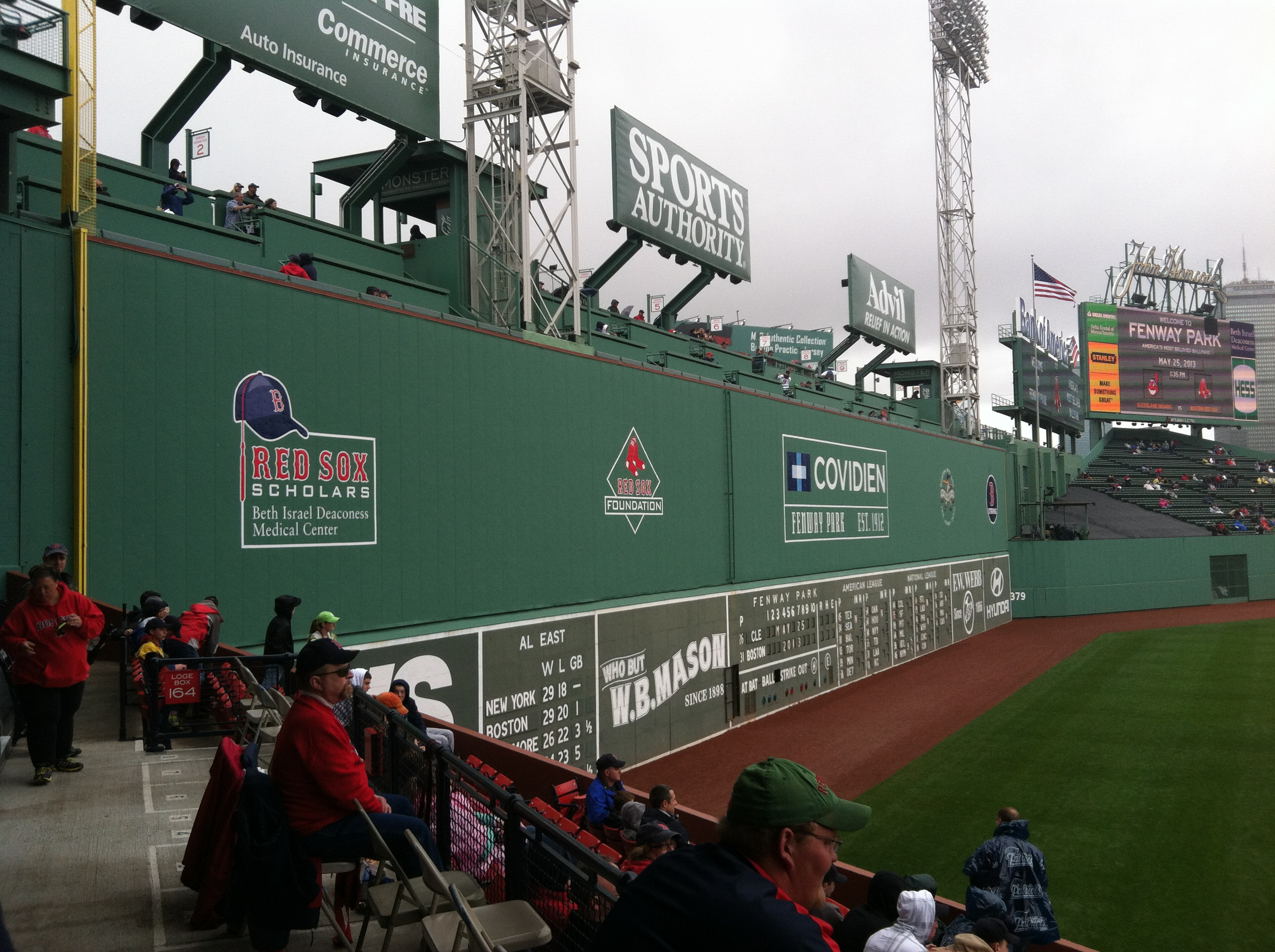
The Green Monster measures 37.167 feet (11.329 m) tall.

The Green Monster is the nickname of the 37.167-foot (11.329 m) left field wall in the park. It is located 310 to 315 feet (94 to 96 m) from home plate; this short distance often benefits right-handed hitters.

Part of the original ballpark construction of 1912, the wall is made of wood, but was covered in tin and concrete in 1934, when the scoreboard was added. The wall was covered in hard plastic in 1976. The scoreboard is manually updated throughout the game. If a ball in play goes through a hole in the scoreboard while the scorers are replacing numbers, the batter is awarded a ground rule double. Similarly, if a batter hits a ball into the balls, strikes, and out lights, it is also ruled a ground rule double.

The inside walls of the Green Monster are covered with players' signatures from over the years. Despite the name, the Green Monster was not painted green until 1947; before that, it was covered with advertisements. The Monster designation is relatively new; for most of its history, it was simply called "the wall." In 2003, terrace-style seating was added on top of the wall.

=== "The Triangle" ===
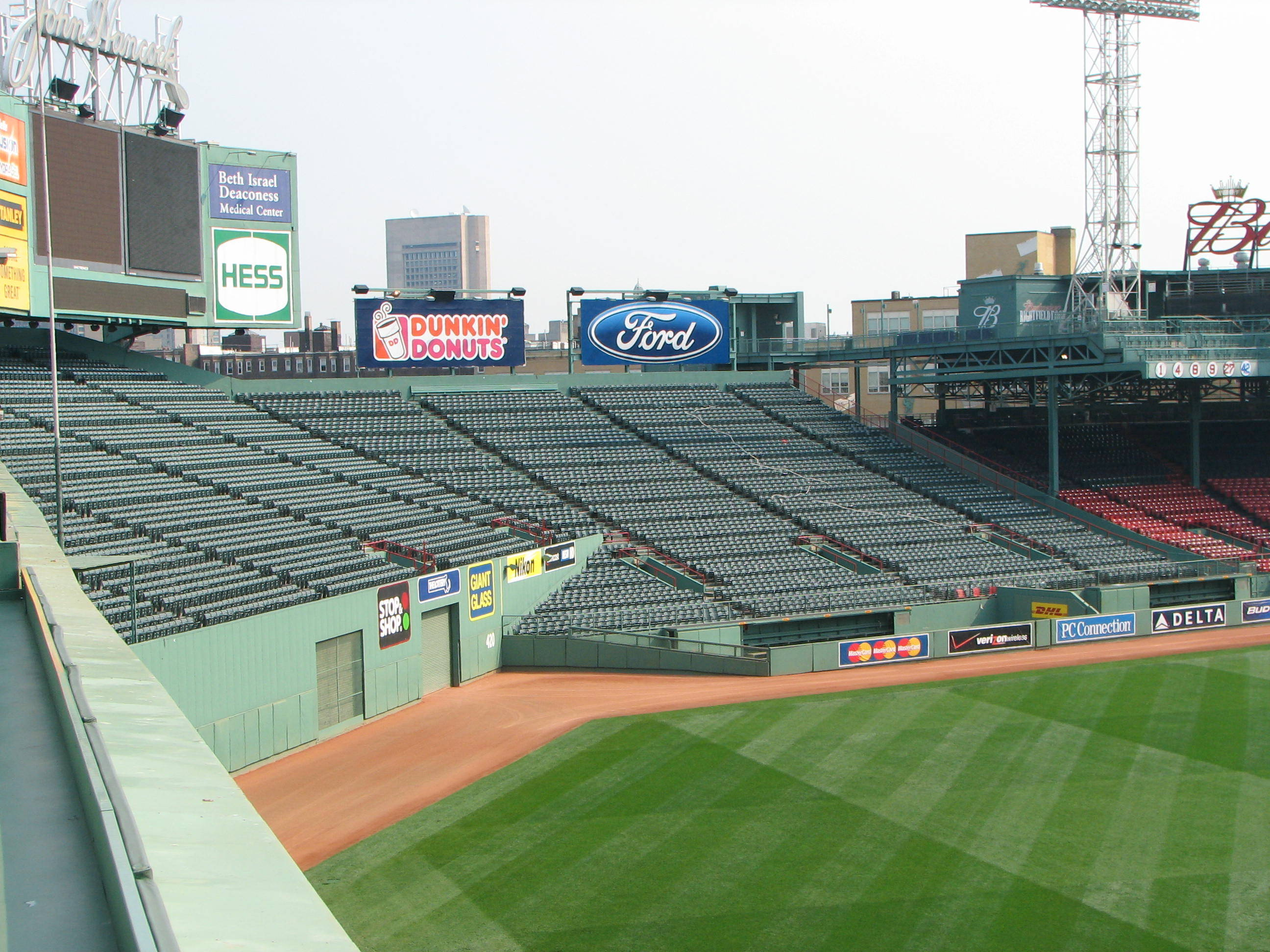
The Triangle

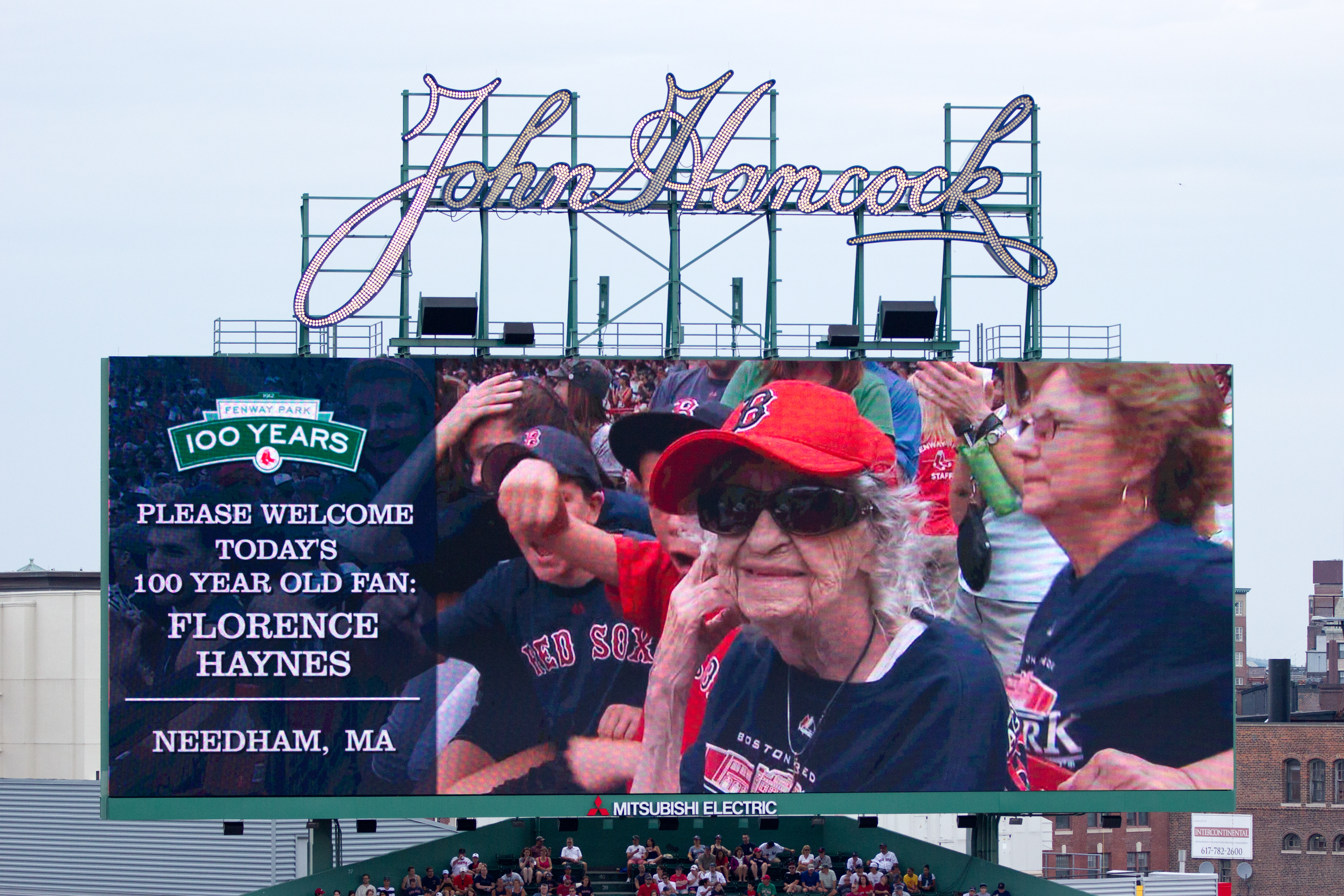
The screen above the Triangle

"The Triangle" is a region of center field where the walls form a triangle whose far corner is 420 feet (130 m) from home plate. That deep right-center point is conventionally given as the center field distance. The true center is unmarked, 390 feet (120 m) from home plate, to the left of "the Triangle" when viewed from home plate.

There was once a smaller "Triangle" at the left end of the bleachers in center field, posted as 388 feet (118 m). The end of the bleachers form a right angle with the Green Monster and the flagpole stands within that little triangle. That is not the true power alley, but deep left-center. The true power alley distance is not posted. The foul line intersects with the Green Monster at nearly a right angle, so the power alley could be estimated at 336 feet (102 m), assuming the power alley is 22.5° away from the foul line as measured from home plate.

=== "Williamsburg" ===
"Williamsburg" was the name, invented by sportswriters, for the bullpen area built in front of the right-center field bleachers in 1940. It was built there primarily for the benefit of Ted Williams, to enable him and other left-handed batters to hit more home runs, since it was 23 feet (7.0 m) closer than the bleacher wall.

=== The Lone Red Seat ===
The lone red seat in the right field bleachers (Section 42, Row 37, Seat 21) signifies the longest home run ever hit at Fenway. The home run, hit by Ted Williams on June 9, 1946, was officially measured at 502 feet (153 m), well beyond "Williamsburg". According to Hit Tracker Online, the ball, if unobstructed, would have flown 520 to 535 feet (158 to 163 m).

The ball landed on Joseph A. Boucher, penetrating his large straw hat and hitting him in the head. A confounded Boucher was later quoted as saying:

How far away must one sit to be safe in this park? I didn't even get the ball. They say it bounced a dozen rows higher, but after it hit my head, I was no longer interested. I couldn't see the ball. Nobody could. The sun was right in our eyes. All we could do was duck. I'm glad I did not stand up.

There have been other home runs hit at Fenway that have contended for the distance title. In the 2007 book The Year Babe Ruth Hit 104 Home Runs, researcher Bill Jenkinson found evidence that on May 25, 1926, Babe Ruth hit one in the pre-1934 bleacher configuration which landed five rows from the top in right field. This would have placed it at an estimated 545 feet (166 m) from home plate. On June 23, 2001, Manny Ramirez hit one that struck a light tower above the Green Monster, which would have cleared the park had it missed. The park's official estimate placed the home run one foot short of Williams' record at 501 feet (152.7 m). An April 2019 home run by Rowdy Tellez of the Toronto Blue Jays was initially reported as 505 feet (154 m), but later found to be significantly shorter, approximately 433 feet (132 m).

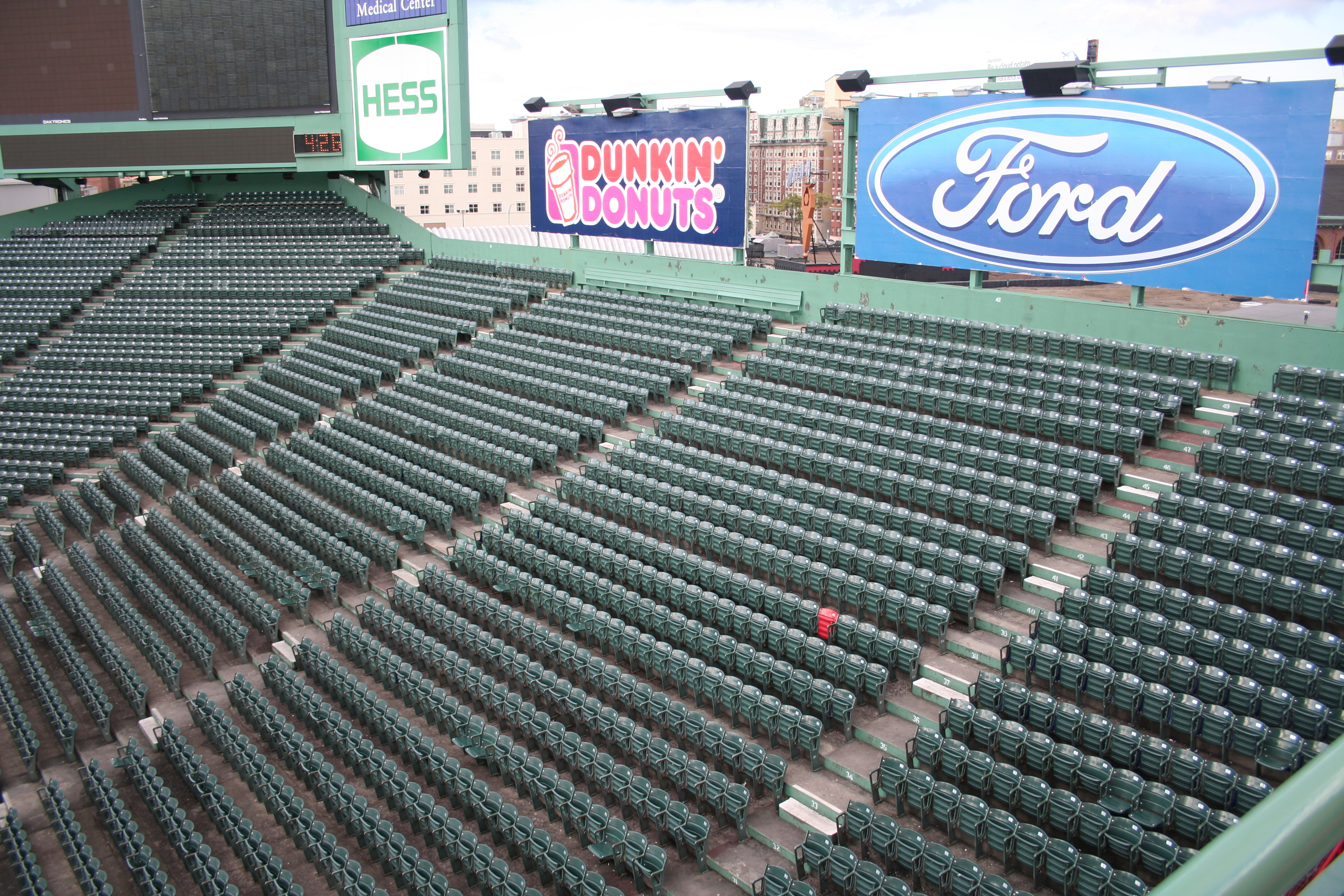
The Red Seat is seen completely surrounded by dark green seats in center field and right field in Fenway Park.

=== Foul poles ===
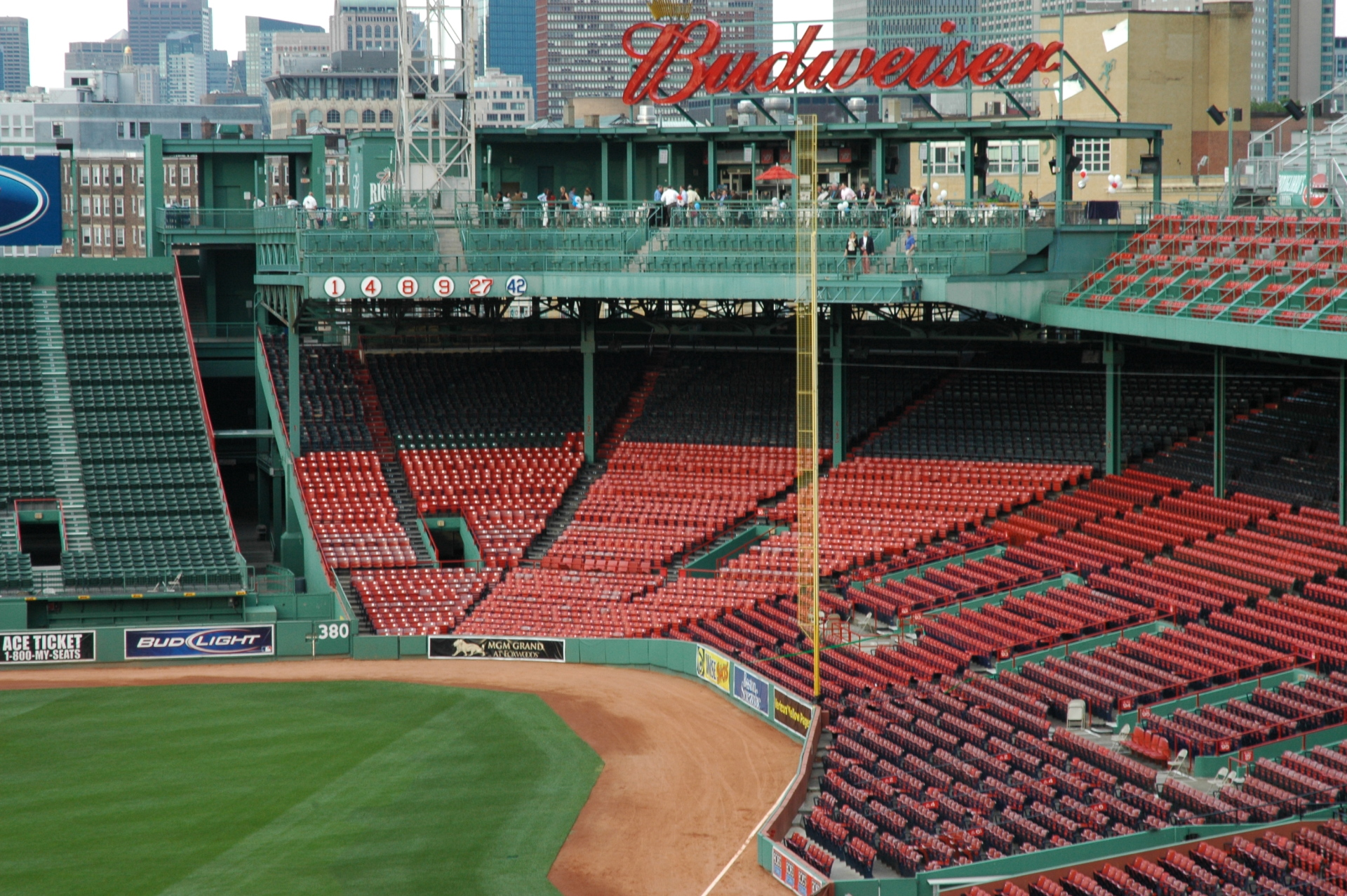
Although it is only 302 feet to "Pesky's Pole", the fence directly behind it sharply curves away.

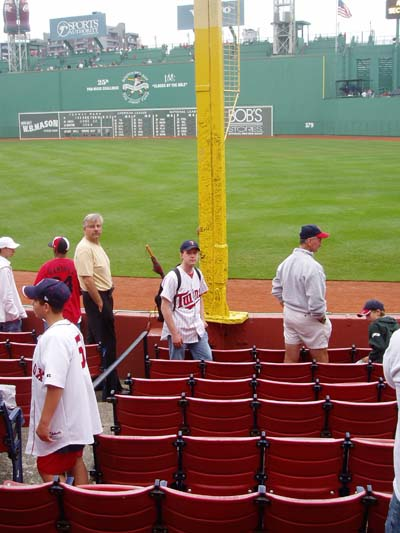
The bottom portion of Pesky's Pole, with the Green Monster in the background and Fenway Park's right field seats in the foreground

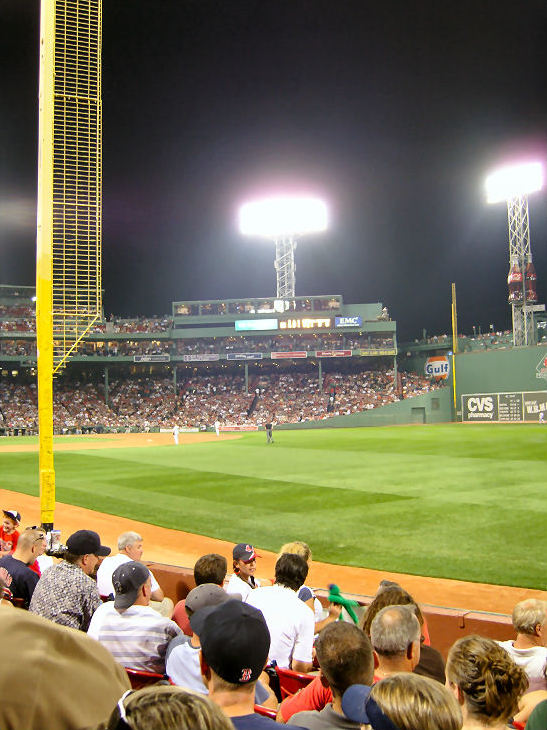
Pesky's Pole during a night game in 2007

Pesky's Pole (or the Pesky Pole) is the name for the pole on the right field foul line, which stands 302 feet (92 m) from home plate, the shortest outfield distance (left or right field) in Major League Baseball. Like the measurement of the left-field line at Fenway Park, this has been disputed. Aerial shots show it to be noticeably shorter than the (actual) 302-foot line in right field, and Pesky has been quoted as estimating it to be "around 295 feet". There is no distance posted on the wall.

Despite the short wall, home runs in this area are relatively rare, as the fence curves away from the foul pole sharply. The pole was named after Johnny Pesky, a non-power-hitting shortstop and long-time coach for the Red Sox, who hit some of his six home runs at Fenway Park around the pole but never off the pole. Pesky (playing 1942 to 1952, except for 1943 to 1945) was a contact hitter who hit just 17 home runs in his career (6 at Fenway Park). It's not known how many of these six actually landed near the pole. The Red Sox give credit to pitcher (and later, Sox broadcaster) Mel Parnell for coining the name. The most notable for Pesky is a two-run homer in the eighth inning of the 1946 Opening Day game to win the game. According to Pesky, Mel Parnell named the pole after Pesky won a game for Parnell in 1948 with a home run down the short right field line, just around the pole. However, Pesky hit just one home run in a game pitched by Parnell, a two-run shot in the first inning of a game against Detroit played on June 11, 1950. The game was eventually won by the visiting Tigers in the 14th inning on a three-run shot by Tigers right fielder Vic Wertz and Parnell earned a no-decision that day.

The term, though it had been in use since the 1950s, became far more common when Parnell became a Red Sox broadcaster in 1965. Mark Bellhorn hit what proved to be the game-winning home run off of Julián Tavárez in game 1 of the 2004 World Series off that pole's screen.

On September 27, 2006, Pesky's 87th birthday, the Red Sox officially dedicated the right field foul pole as "Pesky's Pole", with a commemorative plaque placed at its base.

The seat directly on the foul side of Pesky's Pole in the front row is Section 94, Row E, Seat 5 and is usually sold as a lone ticket.

In a ceremony before the Red Sox' 2005 game against the Cincinnati Reds, the pole on the left field foul line atop the Green Monster was named the Fisk Foul Pole, or Pudge's Pole, in honor of Carlton Fisk. Fisk provided one of baseball's most enduring moments in Game 6 of the 1975 World Series against the Reds. Facing Reds right-hander Pat Darcy in the 12th inning with the score tied at 6, Fisk hit a long fly ball down the left field line. It appeared to be heading foul, but Fisk, after initially appearing unsure of whether or not to continue running to first base, famously jumped and waved his arms to the right as if to somehow direct the ball fair. It ricocheted off the foul pole, winning the game for the Red Sox and sending the series to a seventh and deciding game the next night, which Cincinnati won. Like Johnny Pesky's No. 6, Carlton had his No. 27 player number retired by the team.

=== "Duffy's Cliff" ===
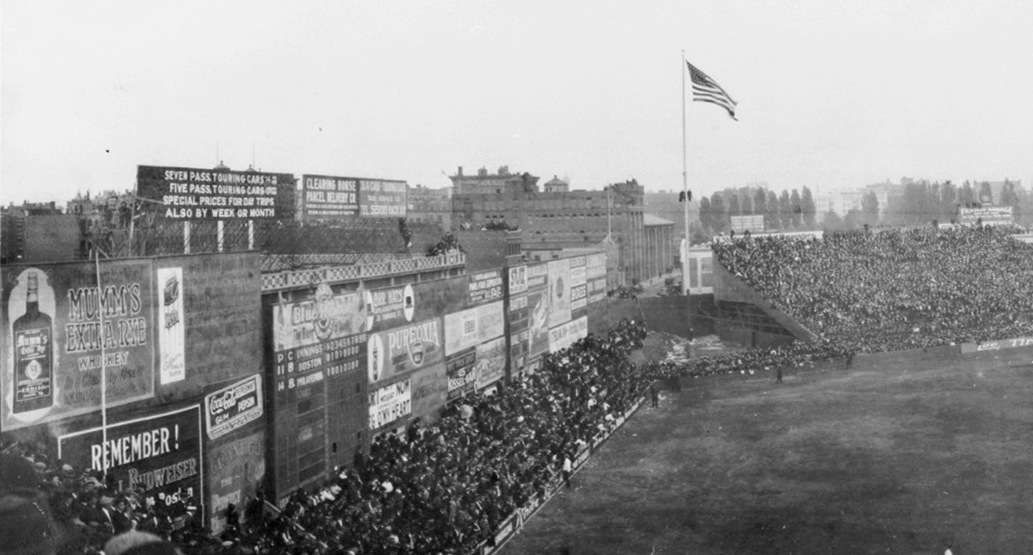
The original ad-covered Green Monster in 1914, with "overflow" fan seating in front of the wall's base, atop "Duffy's Cliff" (seen in the distance, nearest the flagpole)

Fenway Park diagram for the 1912 World Series

From 1912 to 1933, there was a 10-foot-high (3.0 m) incline in front of the then 25-foot-high (7.6 m) left field wall at Fenway Park, extending from the left-field foul pole to the center field flag pole (and thus under "The Triangle" of today). As a result, a left fielder had to play part of the territory running uphill (and back down). Boston's first star left fielder, Duffy Lewis, mastered the skill so well that the area became known as "Duffy's Cliff".

The incline served two purposes: it was a support for a high wall and it was built to compensate for the difference in grades between the field and Lansdowne Street on the other side of that wall. The wall also served as a spectator-friendly seating area during the dead ball era when overflow crowds, in front of the later Green Monster, would sit on the incline behind ropes.

As part of the 1934 remodeling of the ballpark, the bleachers, and the wall itself, Red Sox owner Tom Yawkey arranged to flatten the ground along the base of the wall, so that Duffy's Cliff no longer existed. The base of the left field wall is several feet below the grade level of Lansdowne Street, accounting for the occasional rat that might spook the scoreboard operators.

There has been debate as to the true left field distance, which was once posted as 315 feet (96 m). A reporter from The Boston Globe was able to sneak into Fenway Park and measure the distance. When the paper's evidence was presented to the club in 1995, the distance was remeasured by the Red Sox and restated at 310 feet (94 m). The companion 96-meter (315 ft) sign remained unchanged until 1998, when it was corrected to 94.5 meters (310 ft).

=== Dell EMC Club ===
In 1983, private suites were added to the roof behind home plate. In 1988, 610 stadium club seats enclosed in glass and named the "600 Club", were added above the home plate grandstand replacing the existing press box. The press box was then added to the top of the 600 Club. The 1988 addition has been thought to have changed the air currents in the park to the detriment of hitters. In 2002, the organization renamed the club seats the ".406 Club" (in honor of Ted Williams' batting average in 1941).

Between the 2005 and 2006 seasons the existing .406 club was rebuilt as part of the continuing ballpark expansion efforts. The second deck now features two open-air levels: the bottom level is the new "Dell EMC Club" featuring 406 seats and concierge services and the upper level, the State Street Pavilion, has 374 seats and a dedicated standing room area. The added seats are wider than the previous seats.

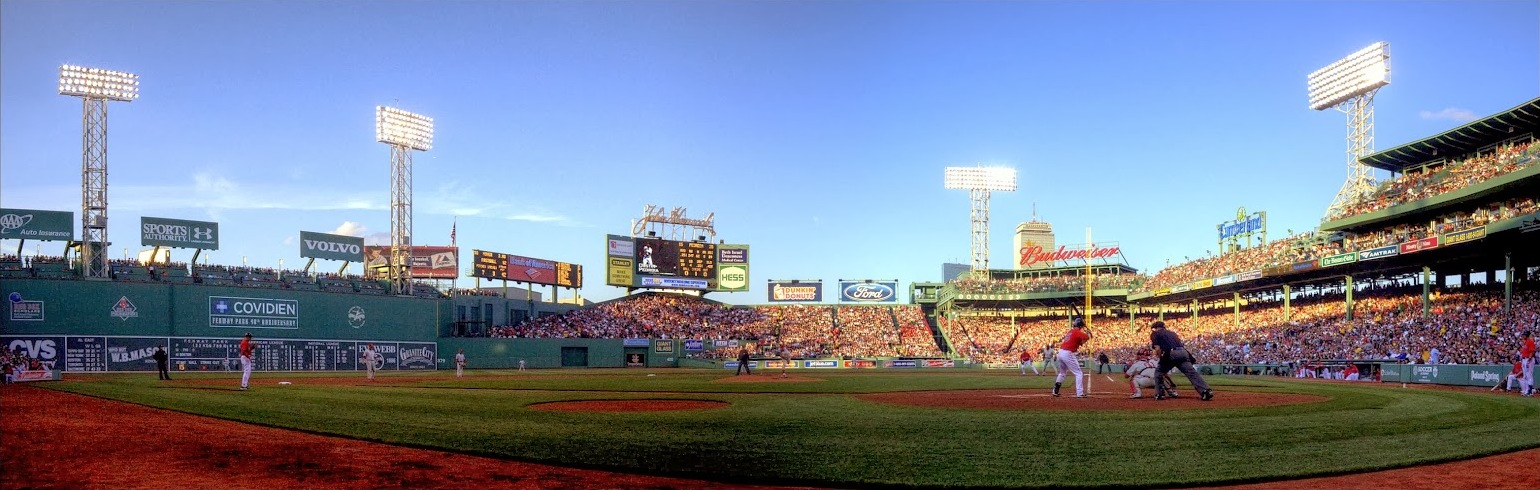
Fenway Park during a 2010 game vs. the Philadelphia Phillies.

=== Statues ===
Outside Gate 5 is The Teammates statue by Antonio Tobias Mendez, which depicts Red Sox players Bobby Doerr, Dom DiMaggio, Ted Williams, and Johnny Pesky. It was unveiled in 2010.

There is also a solo statue of Williams, unveiled in 2004, depicting him placing his cap on the head of a young boy.

=== Organists ===
From 1953–1989, John Kiley played a Hammond X-66 organ for Sox home games. Other organists have been Jim Kilroy (1988–1994), Ray Totaro (1994–2002), and Richard Giglio (1994–2002). Totaro and Giglio played a Yamaha Electone.

Since 2003, Josh Kantor has played the organ for Sox home games at Fenway Park. Kantor plays a double-decker electric Yamaha organ from the stadium's luxury clubhouse, the State Street Pavilion Club, on the third-base side. As of March 2024, he has not missed a single game. He frequently takes requests via social media.

=== Program hawkers ===
In 1990, Mike Rutstein started handing out the first issue of Boston Baseball Magazine (originally called Baseball Underground) outside of the park. He was frustrated with the quality of the program being sold inside the park, which also came out once every two months. The program was sold for $1, half the cost of the programs inside the park. To sell the program, Rutstein's employees would stand outside the park wearing bright red shirts and greet fans by holding a program up and shouting "Program, Scorecard, One Dollar!". By 1992, the Red Sox organization filed complaints with the city code enforcement arguing that the scorecard inside the magazine was not covered under the First Amendment protecting magazines and that Rutstein's employees were operating on the streets without a permit. Despite a lot of attention in the news, Rutstein said the charges were not pursued and no further legal action was taken. In 2012, one of Rutstein's long time employees Sly Egidio quit Boston Baseball to start "The Yawkey Way Report" named after Yawkey Way. By that time, Boston Baseball was selling for $3 per program, $2 cheaper than the in-park programs selling for $5. The Yawkey Way Report cost $1 and Egidio stationed his hawkers close to Boston Baseball's hawkers, starting a "hawker war." The Yawkey Way Report also came with baseball cards, ponchos, and tote bags, which caused Rutstein to file his own complaints with Boston city code enforcement. Despite the rivalry, both programs continue to be hawked outside of Fenway Park and are often the first thing fans see when they approach the stadium on game-day.

== Use ==
=== Baseball ===
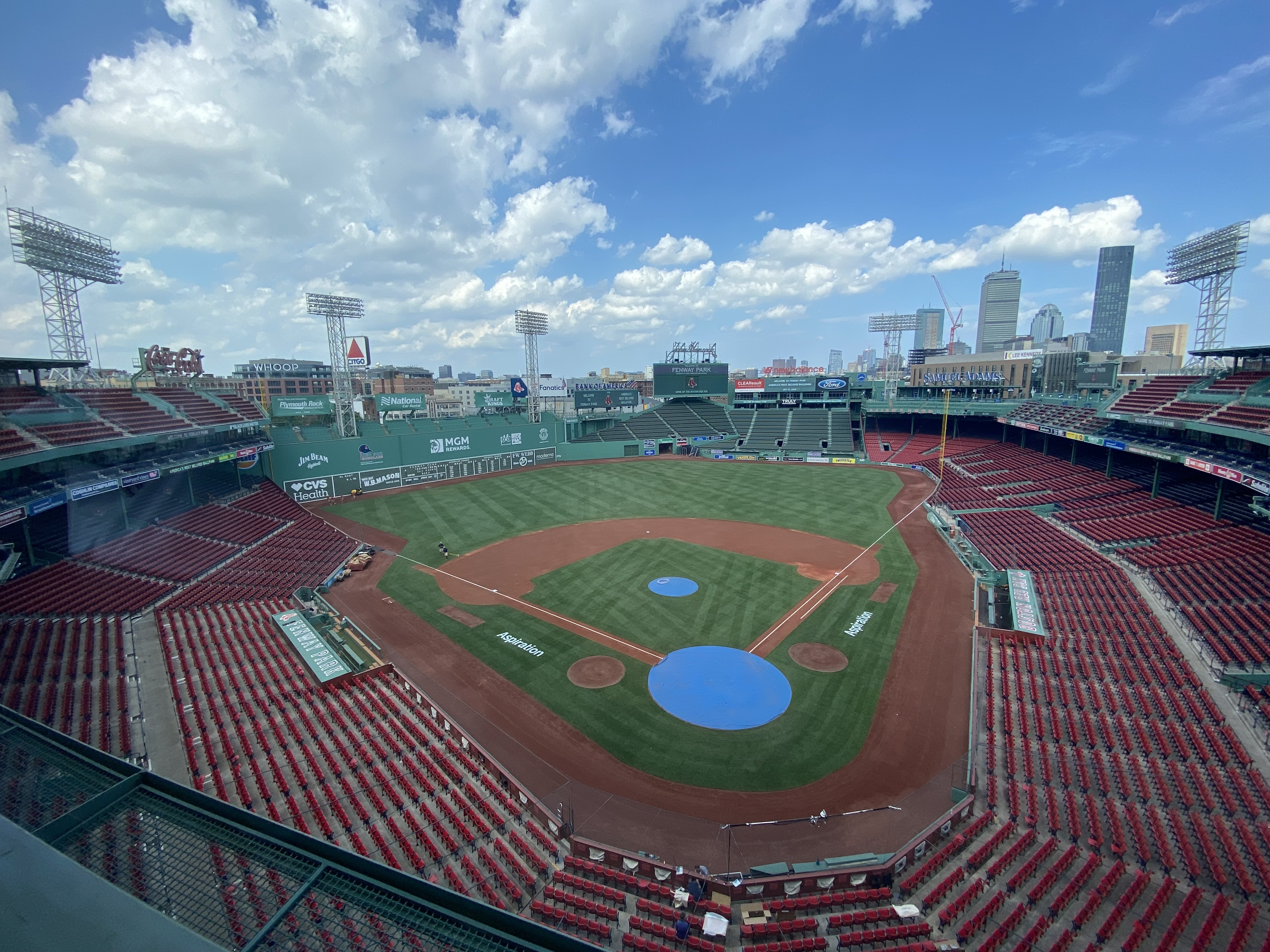
Fenway Park in July 2022

The Red Sox' one-time cross-town rivals, the Boston Braves, used Fenway Park for the 1914 World Series and the 1915 season until Braves Field was completed; ironically, the Red Sox would then use Braves Field – which had a much higher seating capacity – for their own World Series games in 1915 and 1916.

Since 1990 (except in 2005 when, because of field work, it was held in a minor league ballpark, and 2020, as the tournament was cancelled due to the COVID-19 pandemic), Fenway Park has also hosted the final round of a Boston-area intercollegiate baseball tournament called the Baseball Beanpot, an equivalent to the more well-known hockey Beanpot tourney. The teams play the first rounds in minor league stadiums before moving on to Fenway for the final and a consolation game. Boston College, Harvard University, Northeastern University, and the University of Massachusetts Amherst compete in the four-team tournament.

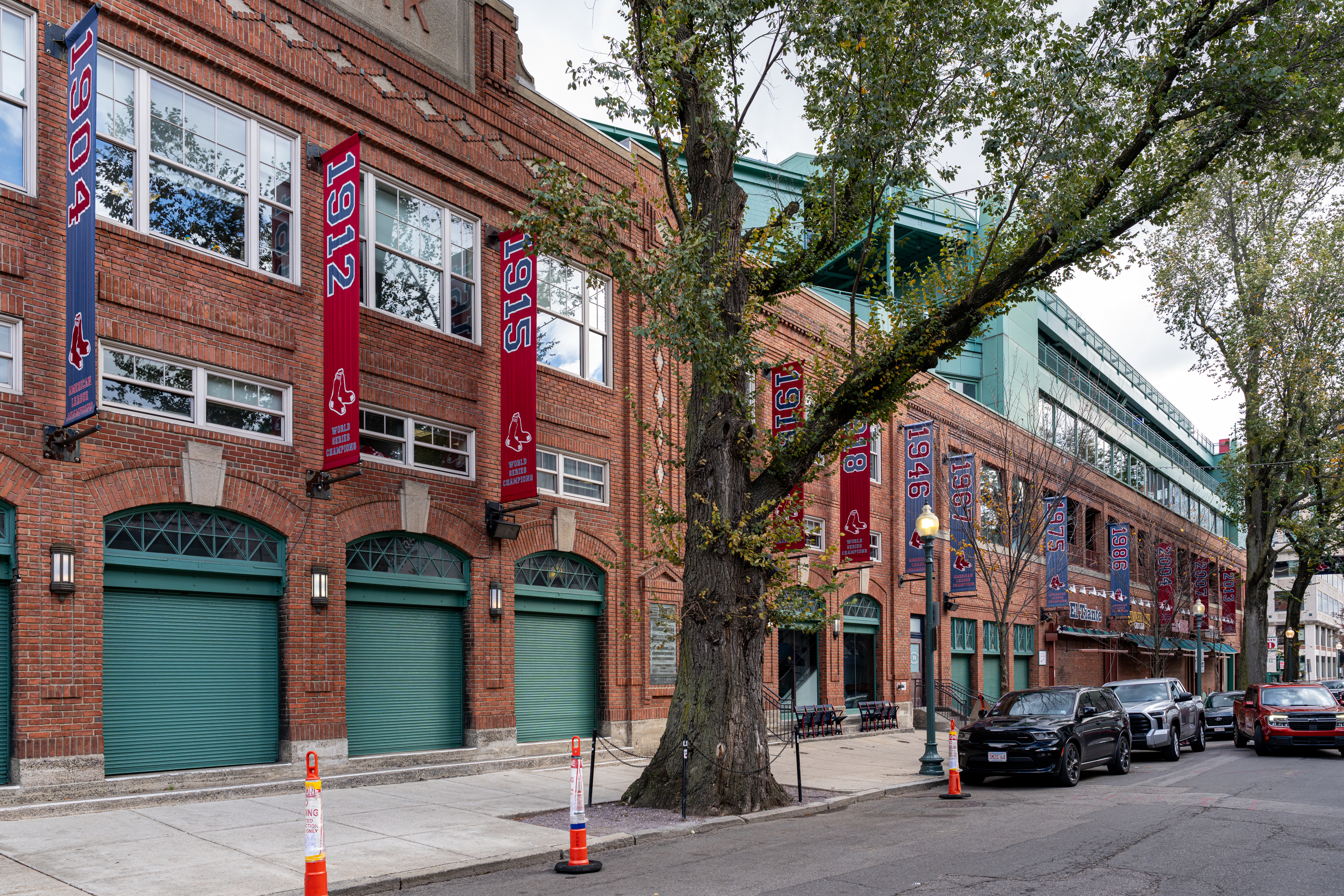
The front of Fenway Park facing Jersey Street

Since at least 1997 Neil Diamond's "Sweet Caroline" has been played at Fenway Park during Red Sox games, in the middle of the eighth inning since 2002. On opening night of the 2010 season at Fenway Park, the song was performed by Diamond himself in the middle of the eighth inning.

From 2006 to 2014, the Red Sox hosted the "Futures at Fenway" event, where two of their minor-league affiliates played a regular-season doubleheader as the "home" teams. Before the Futures day started, the most recent minor-league game held at Fenway had been the Eastern League All-Star Game in 1977.

From 1970 to 1987, the Cape Cod Baseball League (CCBL) played its annual all-star game at various major league stadiums. The games were interleague contests between the CCBL and the Atlantic Collegiate Baseball League (ACBL). The 1975, 1977, 1979, 1981, 1983, 1985 and 1987 games were played at Fenway. The MVP of the 1977 contest was future major league slugger Steve Balboni, who clobbered two home runs over the Green Monster that day. The CCBL returned to Fenway in 2009, 2010 and 2011 for its intraleague all-star game matching the league's East and West divisions. The 2009 game starred East division MVP and future Boston Red Sox Chris Sale of Florida Gulf Coast University. The CCBL also holds an annual workout day at Fenway where CCBL players are evaluated by major league scouts.

==== Baseball records and events of note ====
- Red Sox first baseman Hugh Bradley hit the first home run at Fenway Park on April 26, 1912.
- The first Grand slam hit at Fenway Park was by Rabbit Maranville of the Boston Braves in a 6–2 victory over the Chicago Cubs on September 26, 1914.
- On June 21, 1916, Rube Foster pitched the first no-hitter at Fenway in a 2–0 victory over the Yankees.
- On August 4, 1959, Elijah "Pumpsie" Green became the first African-American player in the Red Sox lineup to play at Fenway.
- On August 19, 1967, Red Sox switch-hitter Reggie Smith became the first player in Fenway Park to hit a home run from both sides of the plate.

=== Boxing ===
On October 9, 1920, Fenway Park was the site of the first open-air boxing show in Boston. The card featured four bouts. Although Eddie Shevlin and Paul Doyle fought in the feature bout, Daniel J. Saunders of the Boston Daily Globe described heavyweights Battling McCreery and John Lester Johnson as "the only boxers who caused any excitement". McCreery, who according to Saunders, "was to take a flop in five rounds", won by judge's decision in ten rounds. After the fight, Johnson punched McCreery while McCreery was trying to shake his hand. McCreery then knocked Johnson out of the ring and hit him over the head with his chair. The card drew 5,000 spectators (half of what was expected) and brought in $6,100 (several thousand less than what was promised to the fighters).

In 1928, New England Welterweight Champion Al Mello headlined three cards at Fenway. He defeated Billy Murphy in front of a crowd of 12,000 on June 26, Charlie Donovan on August 31, and Murphy again on September 13.

On July 2, 1930, future World Heavyweight Champion James J. Braddock made his debut in that weight class. He defeated Joe Monte in ten rounds.

On September 2, 1930, Babe Hunt defeated Ernie Schaaf in what The Boston Daily Globe described as a "dull bout" and a "big disappointment". The undercard included future light heavyweight champion George Nichols, who defeated Harry Allen of Brockton, Massachusetts in ten rounds.

In 1932, Eddie Mack promoted ten cards at Fenway Park. The August 2 card featured World Light Heavyweight Champion Maxie Rosenbloom defeating Joe Barlow of Roxbury and Taunton' Henry Emond defeating The Cocoa Kid. On August 23, Dave Shade defeated Norman Conrad of Wilton, New Hampshire in front of 3,500 attendees. The September 6 card was headlined by World junior lightweight champion Kid Chocolate, who defeated Steve Smith.

On June 25, 1936, former world heavyweight champion Jack Sharkey defeated Phil Brubaker in what would be his final career victory.

In 1937, Rip Valenti and the Goodwin Athletic Club promoted five cards at Fenway. Three of these were headlined by New England Heavyweight Champion Al McCoy. On June 16 McCoy defeated Natie Brown in front of a crowd of 4,516. On July 29 he knocked out Jack McCarthy in the third round. On August 24 he and Tony Shucco fought to a draw. Future WBA featherweight champion Sal Bartolo fought one of his first professional fights on the May 24 undercard.

On June 25, 1945, Tami Mauriello knocked out Lou Nova in 2:47. An estimated crowd of 8,000 was in attendance.

On July 12, 1954, Tony DeMarco knocked out George Araujo 58 seconds into the fifth round in front of 12,000 spectators.

The most recent boxing event at Fenway took place on June 16, 1956. The undercard consisted of Eddie Andrews vs. George Chimenti, Bobby Courchesne vs. George Monroe for the New England Lightweight Championship, and Barry Allison vs. Don Williams for the New England Middleweight Championship. In the main event, Tony DeMarco defeated Vince Martinez by decision. An estimated 15,000 were in attendance—far below promoter Sam Silverman's expectations.

On June 7, 2025, Nolan Bros Boxing Promotions will be hosting a live boxing event at the "Big Concourse" inside the park. This will be the first live boxing event at Fenway Park in nearly 70 years and will feature the first-ever female boxing match in the venue's history (between Alexis Bolduc and Sara Couillard). The event is expected to draw a crowd of approximately 3,000 spectators.

=== Soccer ===
On October 17, 1925, the Boston Soccer Club and the Fall River F.C. of the American Soccer League played a scoreless tie before 4,000 fans. Boston also hosted the Providence Clamdiggers and Indiana Flooring at Fenway later that season. On June 18, 1928, Boston played Rangers F.C. to a 2–2 tie in front of a crowd of 10,000. In 1929, Boston hosted two more matches at Fenway Park; a 3–2 victory over the New Bedford Whalers on August 10 and a 3–2 loss to Fall River on August 17.

On May 30, 1931, 8,000 fans were on hand to see the American Soccer League champion New York Yankees defeat Celtic 4–3. The Yankees goalkeeper, Johnny Reder, would later return to play for the Boston Red Sox.

On May 5, 1967, the park hosted an exhibition between the Atlanta Chiefs and Toronto Falcons of the National Professional Soccer League. The game was a benefit for the Jimmy Fund. The following year, Fenway Park was home to the Boston Beacons of the now-defunct North American Soccer League.

Liverpool supporters at Fenway in July 2012

On July 21, 2010, Fenway hosted an exhibition game between European soccer clubs Celtic F.C. and Sporting C.P. in an event called "Football at Fenway". A crowd of 32,162 watched the two teams play to a 1–1 draw. Celtic won 6–5 on penalty shoot out, winning the first Fenway football challenge Trophy. Recent matches have taken place between Liverpool, an English Premier League club owned by Fenway Sports Group, and A.S. Roma, an Italian Serie A club owned by FSG partner Thomas R. DiBenedetto. The July 25, 2012 match ended in a 2–1 win for AS Roma before a crowd of 37,169. AS Roma also won the rematch on July 23, 2014, by a score of 1–0. On July 21, 2019, Liverpool returned to Fenway for a preseason match against Sevilla, the Spanish team won 2–1 at the end of full-time.

=== American football ===
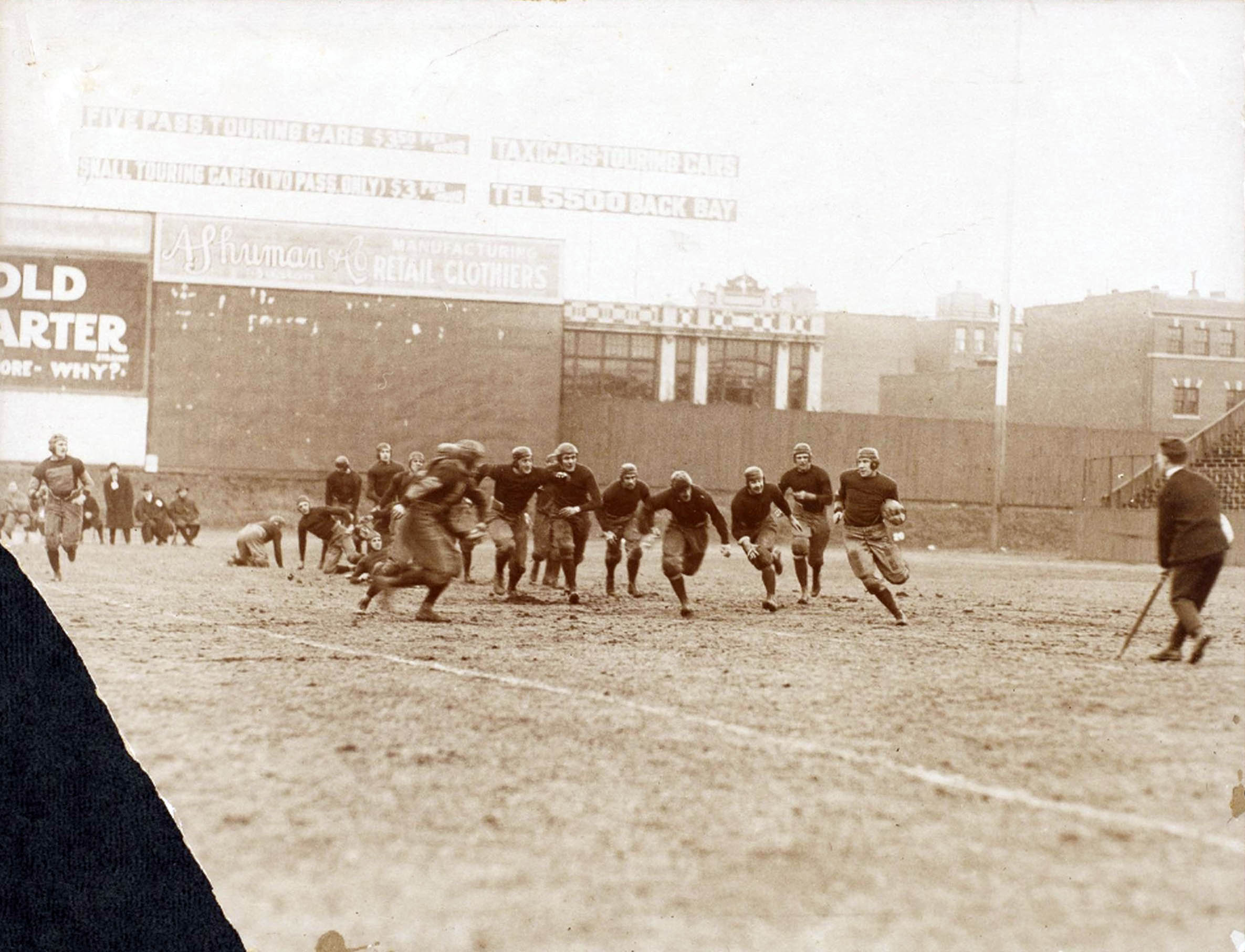
Holy Cross takes on Boston College in 1916 at Fenway Park. BC won the game, 17–14.

Football has been played at Fenway since 1912, the year the venue opened. In 1926, the Boston Bulldogs of the first American Football League played at both Fenway and Braves Field; the Boston Shamrocks of the second American Football League did the same in 1936 and 1937. The Boston Redskins of the National Football League (NFL) played at Fenway for four seasons (1933–1936) after playing their inaugural season in 1932 at Braves Field as the Boston Braves. The Boston Yanks played there in the 1940s; and the Boston Patriots of the 1960s American Football League called Fenway Park home from 1963 to 1968 after moving there from Nickerson Field.

At various times in the past, Dartmouth College, Boston College, Brown University, and Boston University teams have also played college football games at Fenway Park. Boston College has played at Fenway the most, accumulating a win-loss record of 75-21–5 between 1914 and 1956. Boston College and Notre Dame played a game at Fenway in 2015 as part of Notre Dame's Shamrock Series. The annual Harvard–Yale game was played at Fenway and 2018 and 2026, as was the 2025 Secretaries' Cup.

In September 2019, it was announced that the Fenway Bowl, a postseason bowl game, would be played at Fenway Park beginning in 2020, pitting a team from the Atlantic Coast Conference against a team from the American Athletic Conference. However, both the 2020 and 2021 games were canceled, due to the COVID-19 pandemic. The bowl was finally played for the first time in December 2022, as Louisville defeated Cincinnati.

=== Professional wrestling ===
On July 9, 1929, World Heavyweight Champion Gus Sonnenberg defeated Ed "Strangler" Lewis in front of a crowd of 25,000 at Fenway Park.

In 1932, Charlie Gordon promoted shows at Fenway Park. On June 16, 1932, a card headlined by "The Georgia Leech" Paul Adams and George Myerson drew 8,000 spectators. 10,000 people turned out on July 6, 1932, to see a show main evented by Ted Germaine and Stewart Spears. The following week, Steve Passas handed German wrestler Mephisto his first loss in the United States at Fenway. The next week's card was headlined by Myerson and Germaine. Myerson was knocked unconscious, but was declared the winner after referee Joe Beston disqualified Germaine for using a choke hold. The card scheduled for July 27 was postponed until August 3 due to rain. It rained again on August 3 and the card was pushed back another week. However, due to a schedule conflict, Steve Passas, was forced to withdraw from his main event bout with Fred Bruno. On August 10, 1932, Adams defeated Louis Poplin in front of 8,000 fans in the substitute main event.

On August 18, 1934, a crowd of 30,000 turned out for a card headlined by AWA World Heavyweight Champion Ed Don George and NWA World Heavyweight Champion Jim Londos. The fight ended in a draw after 3:14:13.

On June 27, 1935, Danno O'Mahony captured the NWA World Heavyweight Championship from Londos in front of 30,000 fans.

On July 18, 1935, Ed Don George defeated Frank Sexton in an exhibition bout during a musical and athletic carnival benefiting Boston's department of public welfare that also featured a five-mile race, firearms exhibition drill, a boxing exhibition, tug of war contest, and a baseball game. Due to rain, only 5,000 attended the event and the ball game was called off after three innings.

On September 10, 1935, O'Mahony successfully defeated his title against George in front of an estimated crowd of 25,000. The bout, the second between O'Mahony and George, was refereed by world heavyweight boxing champion James J. Braddock. The Paul Bowser-promoted card also featured Ed "Strangler" Lewis, Frank Sexton, Jack Spellman, and Karl Pojello. During the main event, a spectator suffered a heart attack and died. It was the eighth such death at a Boston wrestling bout in the past two years.

On June 29, 1937, around 7,000 spectators saw Steve Casey defeat Ed Don George in a card that also featured Danno O'Mahony, Tor Johnson, and William "Wee Willie" Davis. On July 20, 1937, Casey defeated another former world heavyweight champion, Danno O'Mahony, in front of 8,000. On July 26, 1938, Casey successfully defended his AWA World Heavyweight Championship against Dick Shikat before a crowd of 5,000.

The WWE (then the World Wide Wrestling Federation), hosted its only event at Fenway Park on June 28, 1969. 17,000 turned out to see WWWF World Heavyweight Champion Bruno Sammartino defeat Killer Kowalski in a stretcher match and an undercard that featured a steel cage match between The Sheik and Bulldog Brower, a ten-man battle royal won by Mitsu Arakawa, a six-man midget wrestling tag match, a best three out of five falls six woman tag team match between The Fabulous Moolah, Donna Christanello, and Toni Rose and Vivian Vachon and Rita and Bette Boucher, and singles matches between George Steele and Victor Rivera, Antonio Pugliese and Baron Mikel Scicluna, Dominic DeNucci and Lou Albano, and Ricky Sexton and Duke Savage.

=== Hockey ===
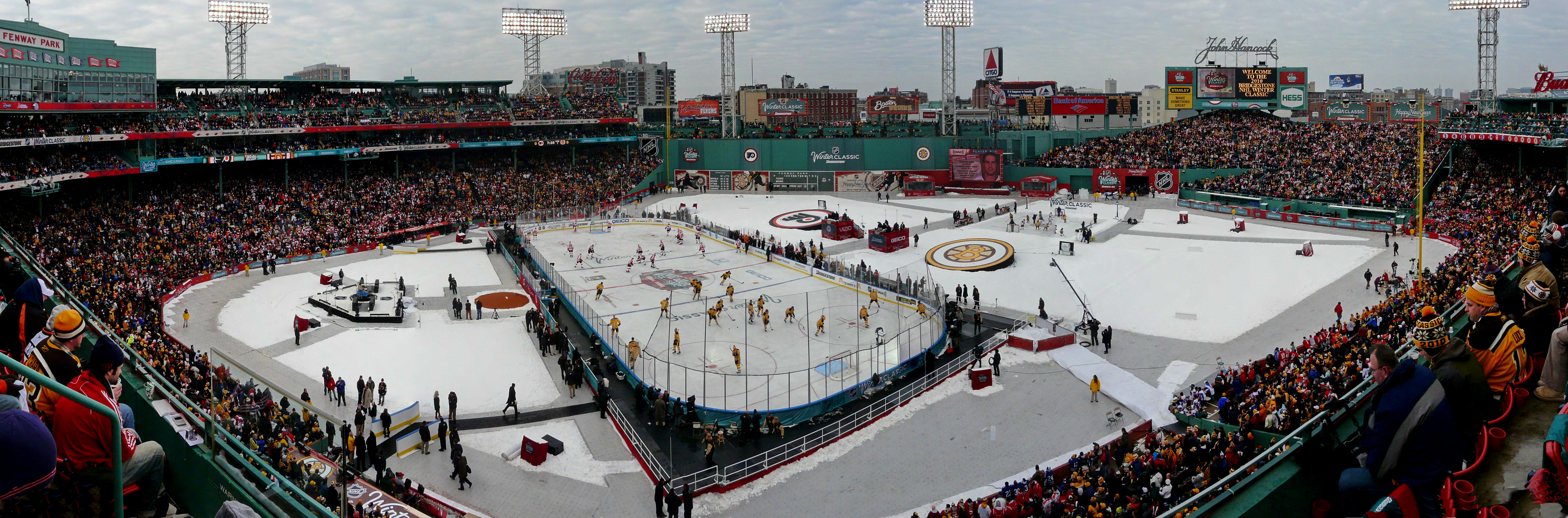
The rink layout for the 2010 NHL Winter Classic

Fenway Park has hosted ice hockey games on five separate occasions, beginning in 2010 when the third annual NHL Winter Classic was held at the stadium on New Year's Day. The Boston Bruins beat the Philadelphia Flyers 2–1 in sudden-death overtime, securing the first home-team victory in the relatively short history of the annual series. The 2010 Winter Classic paved the way for further use of the stadium for ice hockey, as the "Frozen Fenway" series was introduced. Frozen Fenway is a semi-annual series of collegiate and amateur games featuring ice hockey teams from local and regional high schools, colleges, and universities. Division I matches between Hockey East rivals have been a staple of the Frozen Fenway series, which has seen games played in 2012, 2014, 2017, and 2023 at the ballpark. When not in use for games, the rink is also opened to the public for free ice skating. Fenway Park became the first stadium to host two Winter Classic games in January 2023, as the Boston Bruins again secured a 2–1 victory, this time defeating the Pittsburgh Penguins.

=== Hurling and Gaelic football ===
Fenway has hosted Gaelic games over the years. On June 6, 1937, Mayo, the All-Ireland Football champions, defeated a Massachusetts team, 17–8, and on November 8, 1954, Cork, the All-Ireland Hurling champions, defeated an American line-up, 37–28. In more recent times, the Fenway Hurling Classic for the Players Champions Cup has been staged, first in November 2015 when Galway defeated Dublin, and subsequently in November 2017 and November 2018.

=== Concerts ===
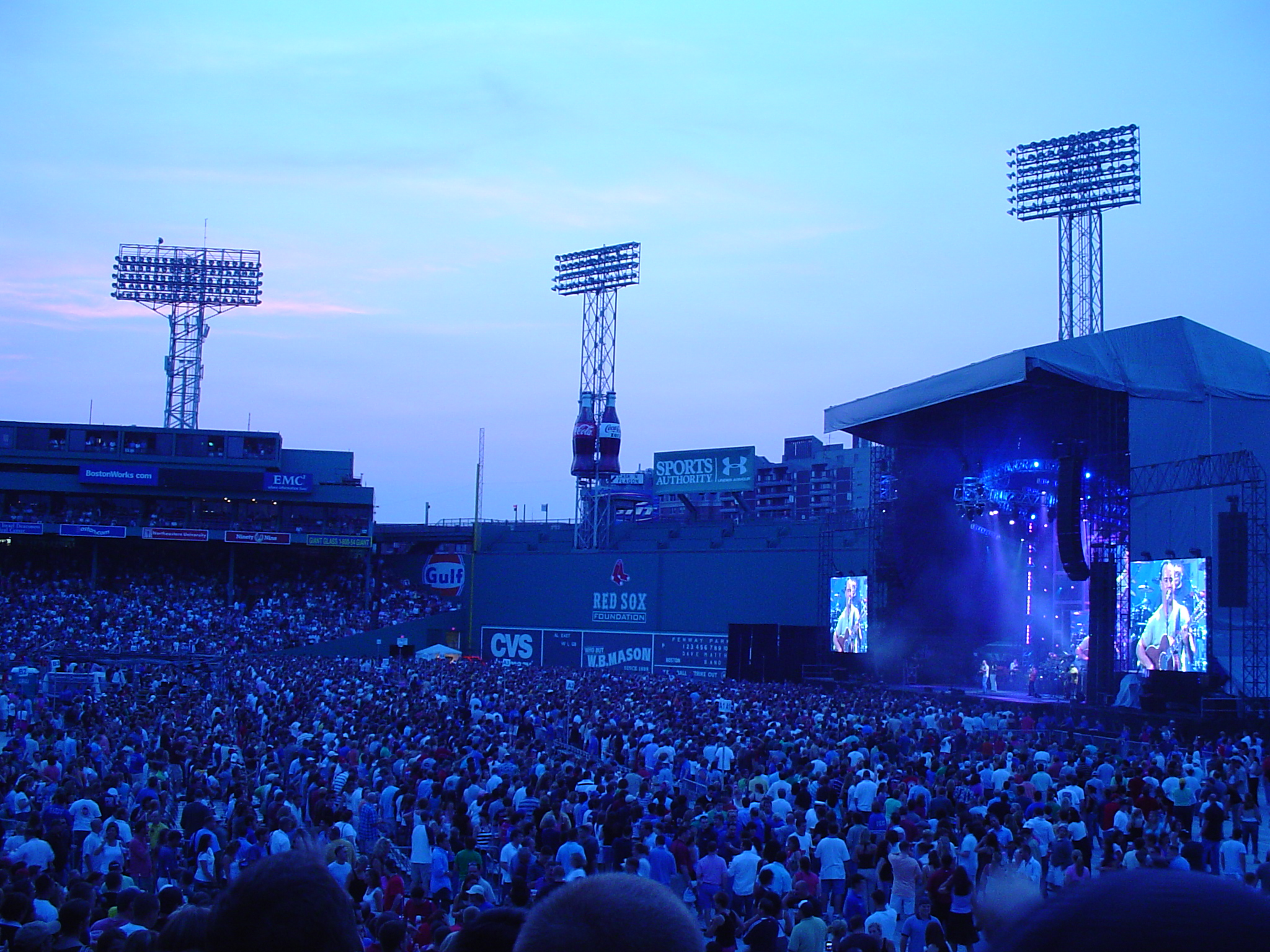
Dave Matthews Band in concert, 2006

Fenway has been home to various concerts beginning in 1973 when Stevie Wonder and Ray Charles first played there. No further concerts were played there until 2003 when Bruce Springsteen and the E Street Band played a leg of their The Rising Tour. Since 2003, there has been at least one concert every year at Fenway by such artists as Bruce Springsteen and the E Street Band, Jimmy Buffett, Billy Joel, Shakira, Journey, Def Leppard, The Rolling Stones, Neil Diamond, The Police, Jason Aldean, Mötley Crüe, Dave Matthews Band, Tom Petty & The Heartbreakers, Aerosmith, Phish, Roger Waters, Paul McCartney, James Taylor (2015–2017 consecutively: 2015 & 2017 with Bonnie Raitt, 2016 with Jackson Browne), Pearl Jam, Foo Fighters, Dead & Company and New Kids On The Block 2011 (with Backstreet Boys), 2017 and 2021.

In 2017, Lady Gaga brought her Joanne World Tour to the stadium, making her the first woman to headline a concert there. In 2022, she returned with The Chromatica Ball. In 2019, The Who played their first ever show at the stadium with the Boston Symphony Orchestra. On August 3, 2021, Guns N' Roses played a show as a part of their 2020 Tour, where they revealed a new song "Absurd". Aerosmith returned for their 50th-anniversary celebrations on September 8, 2022, and the show labeled the venue's highest ticket sales to date.

On July 31 and August 1, 2023, Pink performed at the stadium as part of her Summer Carnival tour, and broke the record for biggest two-day attendance.

=== Ski and snowboard ===
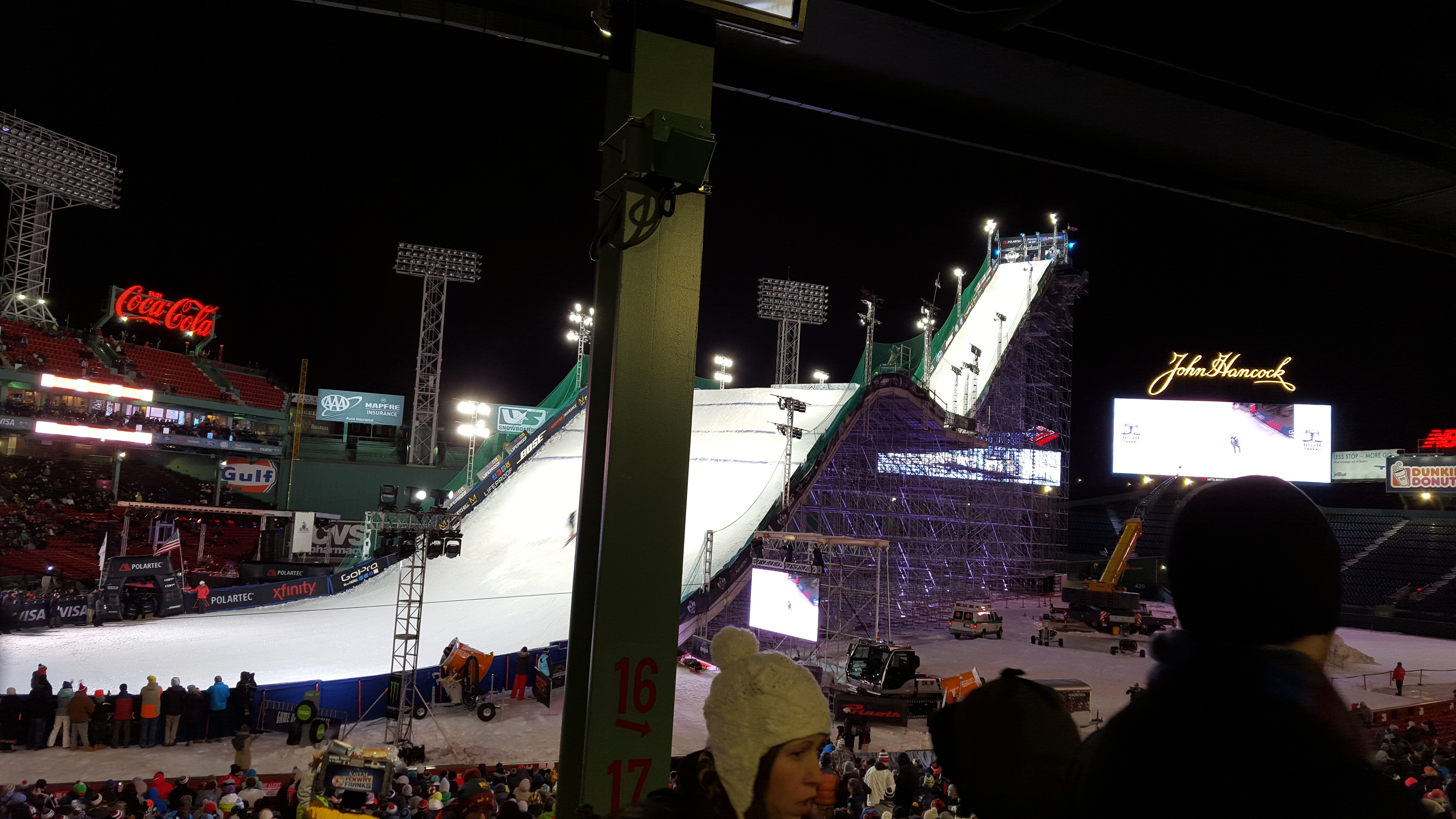
A 140 foot tall ski jump from center field to the pitcher's mound.

Polartec Big Air at Fenway is the first big air snowboarding and skiing competition that was held on February 11–12, 2016. This event was part of the U.S. Grand Prix Tour and the International Ski Federation's World Tour. Notable winter athletes that competed are Ty Walker, Sage Kotsenburg, and Joss Christensen. The big air jump was constructed to be about 140 feet (43 m) tall, standing above the lights of the stadium.

== Public address announcers ==
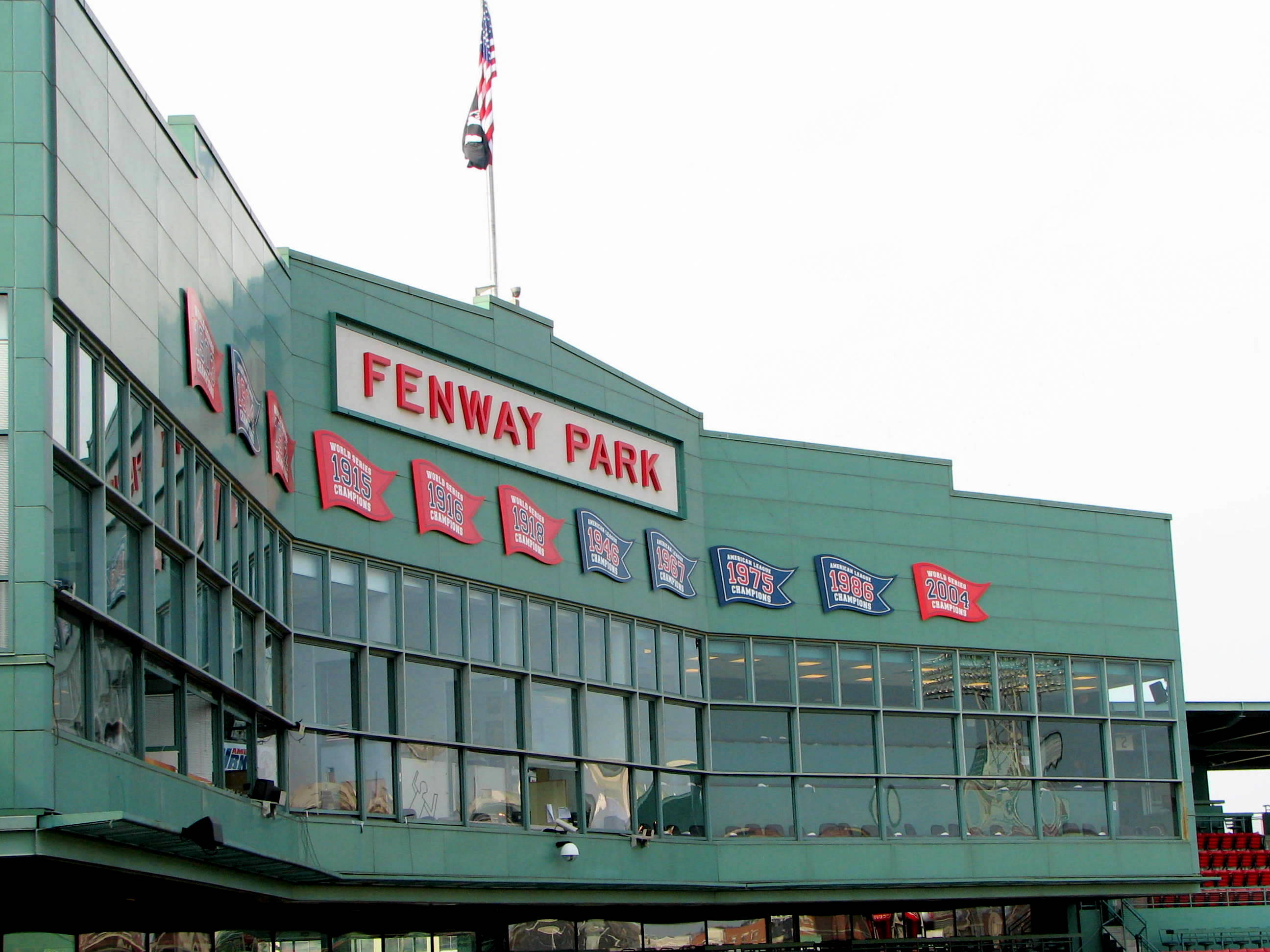
The press box

Frank Fallon was the first public address (PA) announcer for the Red Sox, and held the job from 1953 to 1957. Fred Cusick, better known for his career of announcing Boston Bruins hockey games, joined him in 1956 and also left after 1957. Jay McMaster took over in 1958, until his replacement by Sherm Feller in 1967. Feller served as the announcer for 26 years until his death after the 1993 season. He was known for beginning his games by welcoming the fans with "Good afternoon, ladies and gentlemen, boys and girls. Welcome to Fenway Park", and ending them by saying "Thank you." Leslie Sterling took the job for the 1994 season, becoming the second female PA announcer in the history of Major League Baseball. Ed Brickley took over in 1997, and was replaced by Carl Beane in 2003. Beane was regarded as an "iconic" announcer, and served until his death in 2012, which was caused by a heart attack suffered while driving. Fenway used a series of guest announcers to finish the 2012 season (Note: Guest announcers included Henry Mahegan, Jim Martin, Brian Maurer, James Demler, Jim Murray, Billy Lanni, Dick Flavin, Jon Meterparel, Mike Riley, Tom Grilk, David Wade, Kelly Malone, Dean Rogers, John Dolan, Jonathan Hardacker, David Cook, Charlie Bame-Aldred, Matt Goldstein, Travis Jenkins, Bob Lobel, Gordon Edes, Peter King, Eddie Palladino, and Andy Jick.) before hiring Henry Mahegan, Bob Lobel, and Dick Flavin for 2013. Flavin died after the 2022 season.

== Retired numbers ==
There are 11 retired numbers above the right field grandstand. The numbers retired by the Red Sox are red on a white circle. Jackie Robinson's 42, which was retired by Major League Baseball, is blue on a white circle. The two are further delineated through the font difference; Boston numbers are in the same style as the Red Sox jerseys, while Robinson's number is in the more traditional "block" numbering found on the Dodgers jerseys.

The numbers originally hung on the right-field facade in the order in which they were retired: 9–4–1–8, but after the facade was repainted, the numbers were rearranged in numerical order. They remained in numerical order until the 2012 season, when the numbers were rearranged back into the order in which they were retired by the Red Sox.

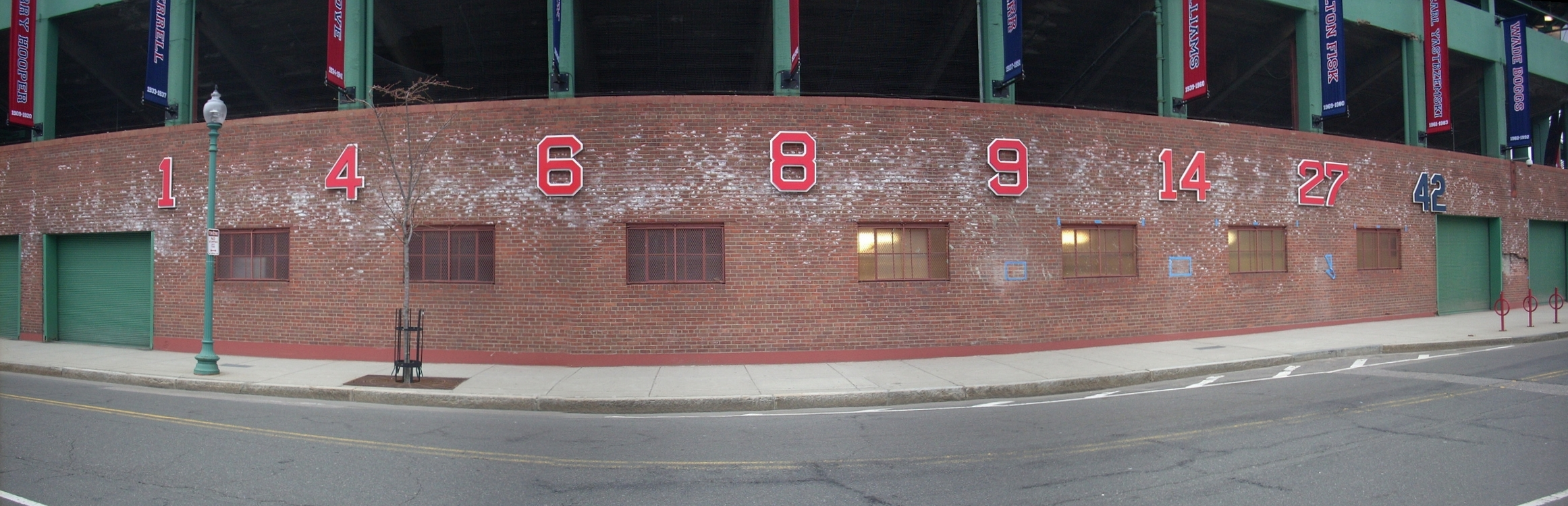
Retired numbers on the outside of the stadium in 2010

The Red Sox policy on retiring uniform numbers was once one of the most stringent in baseball: the player had to be elected to the National Baseball Hall of Fame, play at least 10 years with the team, and retire as a member of the Red Sox. The final requirement was waived for Carlton Fisk as he had finished his playing career with the Chicago White Sox. However, Fisk was assigned a Red Sox front office job and effectively "finished" his baseball career with the Red Sox in this manner. In 2008, the ownership relaxed the requirements further with the retirement of Johnny Pesky's number 6. Pesky has not been inducted into the Hall of Fame, but in light of his over 50 years of service to the club, the management made an exception. Pesky would have had 10 seasons, but he was credited with the three seasons he served as an Operations Officer in the U.S. Navy during World War II. The most recent number retired was 34, worn by 2013 World Series Most Valuable Player David Ortiz.

Red Sox retired numbers
No.	Player	Position	Red Sox Years	Date Retired	Notes
1	Bobby Doerr	2B	1937–44; 1946–51	May 21, 1988	US Army, 1945
4	Joe Cronin	SS	1935–45	May 29, 1984	Player-Manager
6	Johnny Pesky	SS, 3B, 2B	1942, 46–52	September 28, 2008	US Navy, 1943–45
8	Carl Yastrzemski	LF, 1B, DH	1961–83	August 6, 1989	AL MVP (1967); Triple Crown (1967)
9	Ted Williams	LF	1939–42; 1946–60	May 29, 1984	US Marines, 1943–45, 52–53
14	Jim Rice	LF, DH	1974–89	July 28, 2009	AL MVP (1978)
26	Wade Boggs	3B	1983–1992	May 26, 2016	
27	Carlton Fisk	C	1969, 71–80	September 4, 2000	AL Rookie of the Year (1972)
34	David Ortiz	DH	2003–2016	June 23, 2017	3× World Series Champion (2004, 2007, 2013); 2004 ALCS MVP; 2013 World Series MVP
45	Pedro Martínez	P	1998–2004	July 28, 2015	World Series Champion (2004)
42	Jackie Robinson	Brooklyn Dodgers 1947–1956, retired by Major League Baseball, April 15, 1997			

== Ground rules ==
- A ball going through the scoreboard, either on the bounce or fly, is a ground rule double.
- A fly ball striking the left-center field wall to the right of, or on the line behind, the flag pole is a home run.
- A fly ball striking a wall or flag pole and bouncing into the bleachers is a home run.
- A fly ball striking the line or to the right of same on the wall in center field is a home run.
- A fly ball striking the wall to the left of the line and bouncing into the bullpen is a home run.
- A ball sticking in the bullpen screen or bouncing into the bullpen is a ground rule double.
- A batted or thrown ball remaining behind or under the canvas or in the tarp cylinder is a ground rule double.
- A ball striking the top of the scoreboard in left field in the ladder below the top of the wall and bouncing out of the park is a ground rule double.
- A fly ball that lands above the red line on top of the Green Monster and bounces onto the field of play is ruled a home run.
- A fly ball that hits the rail in the right-center triangle is a home run.

It is a misconception among fans that a fly ball that gets stuck in the ladder above the scoreboard on the left field wall is ruled a ground rule triple. There is no mention of it in the Red Sox ground rules list.

== Access and transportation ==
- Fenway Park can be reached by the Massachusetts Bay Transportation Authority (MBTA) Green Line subway's Kenmore station on the "B", "C" and "D" branches, as well as Fenway station on the "D" branch.
- Lansdowne station is served by all MBTA Framingham/Worcester Line commuter rail trains. This line provides service from South Station or Back Bay and points west of Boston. In 2014, the new station was completed with full-length platforms, elevators, and access to Brookline Avenue and Beacon Street.
- Another option is taking the Orange Line or commuter rail to Back Bay or Ruggles. The stations are a 30-minute walk to Fenway.
- Although the Massachusetts Turnpike passes close to Fenway Park, there is no direct connection. Motorists are directed to use Storrow Drive to access the park.

== See also ==
- List of Major League Baseball stadiums
- National Register of Historic Places listings in southern Boston, Massachusetts
- Cask'n Flagon
- Lists of stadiums

== Notes ==
Events and tenants
Preceded by Huntington Avenue Grounds	Home of the Boston Red Sox; 1912 – present	Succeeded by Current
Preceded by South End Grounds	Home of the Boston Braves; 1914 – 1915	Succeeded by Braves Field
Preceded by Braves Field	Home of the Boston Redskins; 1933 – 1936	Succeeded by Griffith Stadium
Preceded by Nickerson Field	Home of the Boston Patriots; 1963 – 1968	Succeeded by Alumni Stadium
Preceded by Forbes Field; Candlestick Park; Coors Field	Host of the All-Star Game; 1946; 1961; 1999	Succeeded by Wrigley Field; RFK Stadium; Turner Field
Preceded by Wrigley Field; Target Field	Host of the NHL Winter Classic; 2010; 2023	Succeeded by Heinz Field; T-Mobile Park
