= Cask'n Flagon =

Restaurant and sports bar in Massachusetts, US

Coordinates: 42.3473°N 71.0983°W

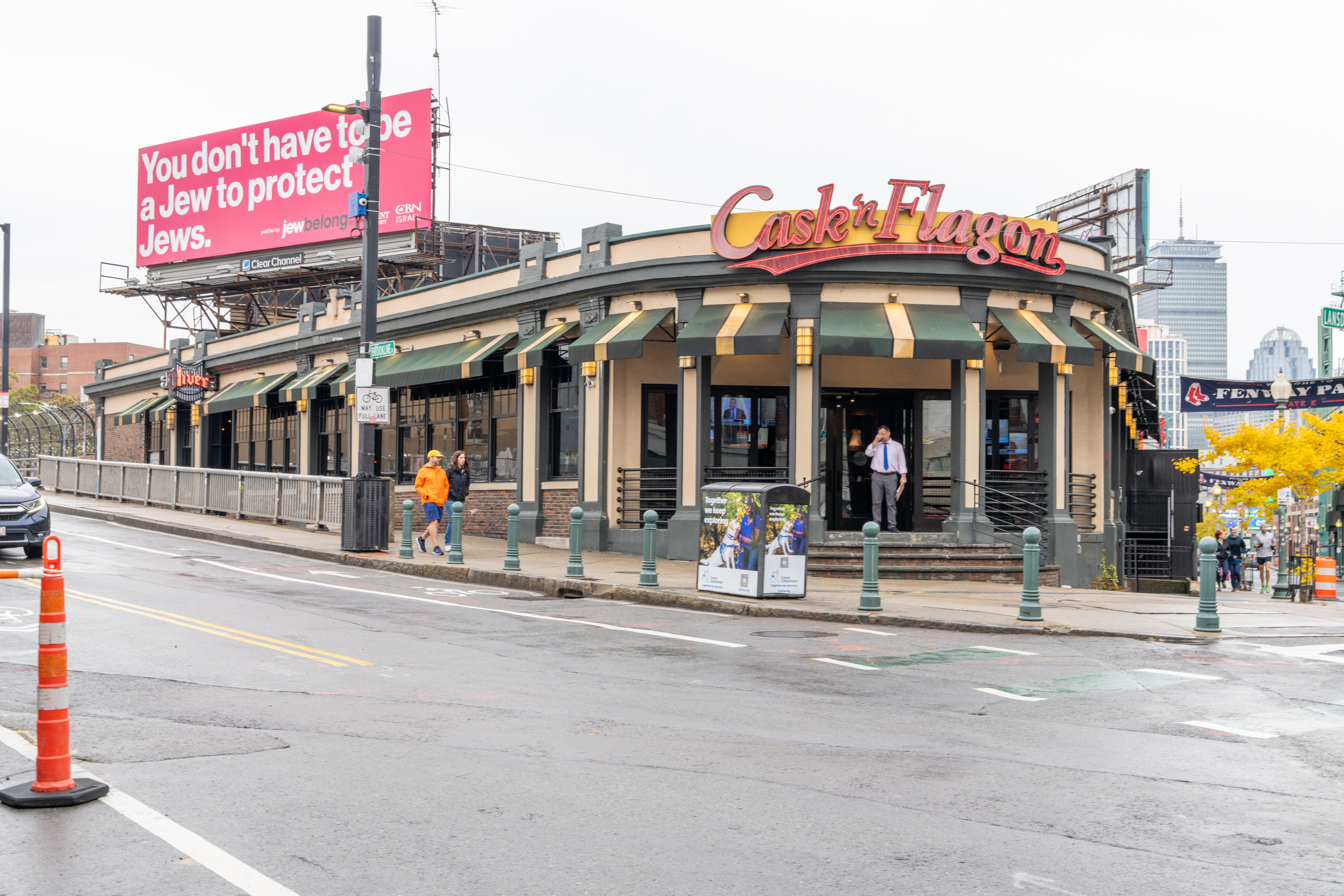
Cask 'n Flagon

The Cask 'N Flagon is a restaurant and sports bar with locations at Fenway Park in Boston and on RT. 139 in Marshfield, Massachusetts. Both locations are owned locally. ESPN has rated it second "Top Baseball Bar in America."

The bar/restaurant began as a small neighborhood bar known as Oliver's over forty years ago. Now, on busy event days at Fenway Park the bar caters to as many as 5,000 patrons.

Oliver's Nightclub is a part of the Cask building and is located in the rear of the restaurant. It hosts private events a dance party on Friday and Saturday nights. Oliver's has hosted live music artists such as Bruce Springsteen, jam session with Jimi Hendrix and many local and national acts. Oliver's features a 400 sq ft (37 m^{2}) dance floor, state-of-the-art sound and light system and HD projectors.

The Fenway location is directly across the street from Fenway Park on the corner of Brookline and Lansdowne Streets. It has been locally owned for over 40 years.

In 2022 Michael Campbell, who was a bouncer, was convicted of raping a woman while working at the Cask'n Flagon. The woman asked Campbell if she could use the bathroom after the bar had closed. He allowed her inside and then sexually assaulted her in the bathroom .
