= Dick Flavin (poet) =

American poet (1936–2022)

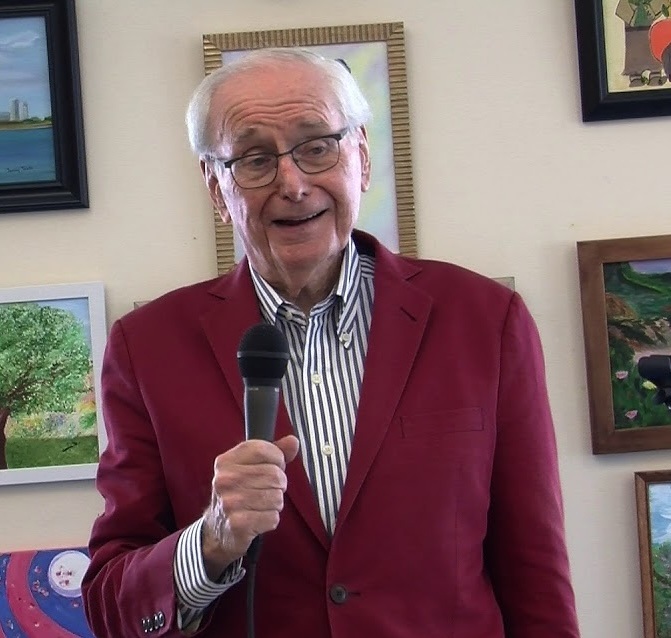
- Flavin in 2018
- Born: December 7, 1936; Boston, Massachusetts, U.S.
- Died: December 28, 2022 (aged 86); Weymouth, Massachusetts, U.S.
- Resting place: Saint Mary's Cemetery, Quincy, Massachusetts
- Education: Stonehill College
- Occupations: Poet, television commentator, announcer

Richard Patrick Flavin (December 7, 1936 – December 28, 2022) was an American poet known as the "poet laureate of the Boston Red Sox", as well the team's public address announcer and a journalist, television commentator, and playwright.

== Life and early career ==
Flavin was born on December 7, 1936, in Boston and grew up in neighboring Quincy, Mass. He attended Archbishop Williams High School in Braintree, and Stonehill College. He took graduate courses in radio and television at New York University.

Flavin became the press spokesman for the Massachusetts State Democratic Committee in 1963, and a speechwriter for several Democratic politicians, including Ted Kennedy. He went on to become press secretary for the president of the Massachusetts Senate and, in 1967, for the successful campaign of Kevin White for Mayor of Boston.

In 1970, Flavin left politics for political reporting. He became political editor and reporter for the WNAC-TV in Boston before moving to WBZ-TV in 1973, where he spent 14 years as a commentator. It was while at WBZ that he was nominated for 14 New England Regional Emmy Awards, winning seven times. In 1987, Flavin left television to spend all his time on the lecture circuit.

His work as a broadcaster was honored in 2011 with his induction into the Massachusetts Broadcasters Hall of Fame.

== Creative work ==
Flavin's one-man play, According to Tip, was produced at Boston's New Repertory Theatre in 2008, starring Ken Howard. It received generally favorable reviews for capturing both the public and private life of Tip O'Neill, the Democratic speaker of the US House of Representatives. It was awarded “Best New Play of the Year” by the critics and writers that make up the Independent Reviewers of New England. Flavin himself performed in the role on several occasions, and was quoted as saying "It was a challenge to write about, and will be a challenge to portray, such a unique character."

In 2001, Flavin took the road trip of a lifetime for a baseball fan when he drove by automobile from Massachusetts to Florida with Boston Red Sox greats Dom DiMaggio and Johnny Pesky to visit with Ted Williams, who was gravely ill. In order to justify his presence with three heroes from his boyhood, Flavin rewrote "Casey at the Bat" and converted it into "Teddy at the Bat", tweaking the poem's plot line so that Ted did not disappoint the fans. Flavin recited it in front of the three old players for what he thought would be the only time, but word of the reconfigured poem got out back in Boston. He was asked to reprise the recitation at Fenway Park several months later at a memorial when Williams died. He has since performed it all over the country, including at the Baseball Hall of Fame in Cooperstown, New York, and with the Boston Pops Orchestra at Boston's Symphony Hall. David Halberstam, the Pulitzer Prize-winning author, heard about the road trip that Flavin, DiMaggio and Pesky made to see Williams and wrote a book about it, The Teammates, which became the most successful book of Halberstam's career. Later ESPN produced a documentary based on the book. Narrated by Flavin, it was nominated for a national Emmy award.

Flavin was inspired to write more poems about the Red Sox, and was named their 'poet laureate', as well as becoming, in 2013, the public address announcer for day games at Fenway Park. He said he got the job because "the guy before me died". He made appearances for the team where he recited his verses, at events like Truck Day. In 2015, he compiled his poems into a book, Red Sox Rhymes: Verses and Curses, which was praised by notable Red Sox fans including Doris Kearns Goodwin and Michael Dukakis. In a promotional video, Flavin says the book can teach "everything you want to know about the Red Sox, and it does it all in verse." The book appeared on the New York Times sports bestseller list in August and September 2015.

== Death ==
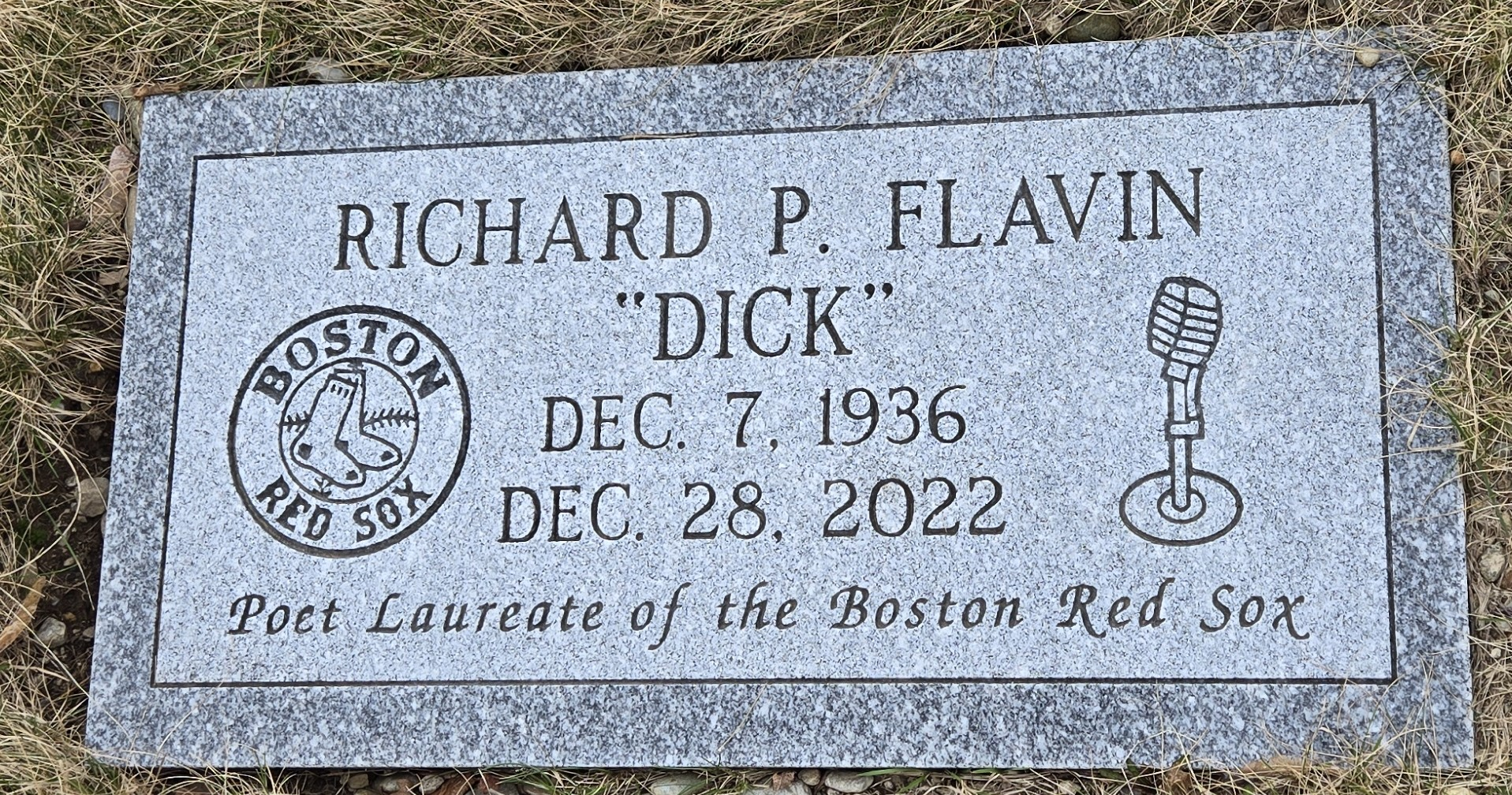
Flavin's grave in Saint Mary's Cemetery, Quincy, Massachusetts

Flavin died in Weymouth, Massachusetts, on December 28, 2022, at the age of 86.

== Bibliography ==
- 2015 Red Sox Rhymes: Verses and Curses New York: William Morrow (ISBN 9780062391520)
