= List of Boston Red Sox coaches =

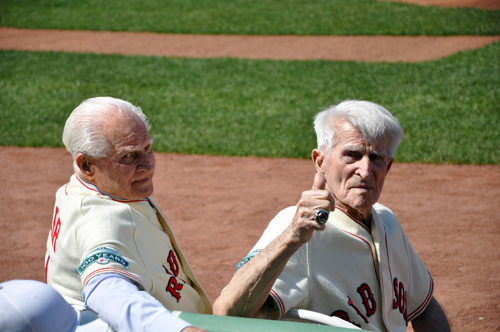
Bobby Doerr (left) and Johnny Pesky both played for the Red Sox and later served as Red Sox coaches.

The following is a list of coaches, including role(s) and year(s) of service, for the Boston Red Sox American League franchise (1901–present), known during its early history as the Boston Americans (1901–1907).

== Bench coach ==
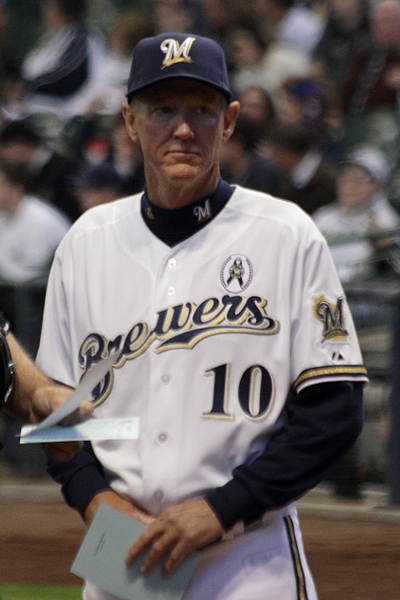
Ron Roenicke served as bench coach for the 2018 championship team.

- Bing Miller: 1937
- Don Zimmer: July 25, 1992 – end of season
- Tim Johnson: 1995–1996
- Grady Little: 1997–1999
- Buddy Bailey: 2000
- Dave Jauss: 2001
- Mike Stanley: 2002
- Jerry Narron: 2003
- Brad Mills: 2004–2009
- DeMarlo Hale: 2010–2011
- Tim Bogar: 2012
- Torey Lovullo: 2013–2016 (leave of absence from mid-August 2015 through end of season)
  - Dana LeVangie: August 16, 2015–end of season (interim)
- Gary DiSarcina: 2017
- Ron Roenicke: 2018–2019
- Jerry Narron: 2020
- Will Venable: 2021–2022
- Ramón Vázquez: 2023 – April 25, 2026
- José David Flores: April 27, 2026 – present (interim)

== Third base coach ==
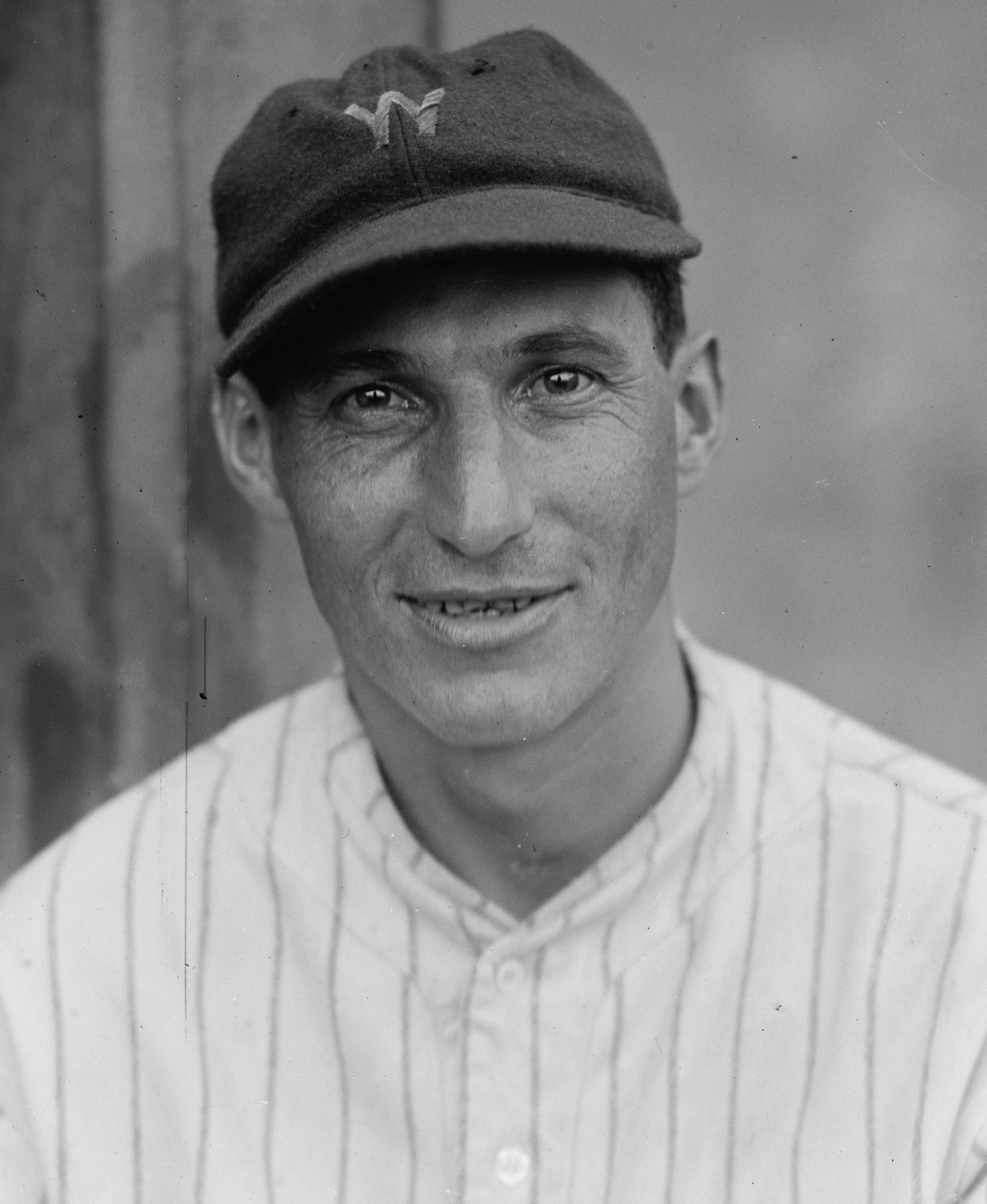
Al Schacht was third base coach in 1935 and 1936.

- Al Schacht: 1935–1936
- Tom Daly: 1937–1943
- Bill Burwell: 1944
- Del Baker: 1945–1948
- Kiki Cuyler: 1949
- Steve O'Neill: 1950
- Eddie Mayo: 1951
- Ski Melillo: 1952–1953
- Buster Mills: 1954
- Jack Burns: 1955–1959
- Billy Herman: 1960–1964
- Billy Gardner: 1965–1966
- Eddie Popowski: 1967–1973
- Don Zimmer: 1974 – July 18, 1976
- Eddie Popowski: July 19, 1976–end of season
- Eddie Yost: 1977–1984
- Rene Lachemann: 1985–1986
- Joe Morgan: 1987–July 10, 1988
- Rac Slider: July 15, 1988–1990
- Dick Berardino: 1991
- Don Zimmer: 1992–July 24, 1992
- Rick Burleson: July 25, 1992–1993
- Gary Allenson: 1994
- Dave Oliver: 1995–1996
- Wendell Kim: 1997–2000
- Gene Lamont: 2001
- Mike Cubbage: 2002–2003
- Dale Sveum: 2004–2005
- DeMarlo Hale: 2006–2009
- Tim Bogar: 2010–2011
- Jerry Royster: 2012
- Brian Butterfield: 2013–2017
- Carlos Febles: 2018–2023
- Kyle Hudson: 2024 – April 25, 2026
- Chad Epperson: April 26, 2026 – present (interim)

== First base coach ==
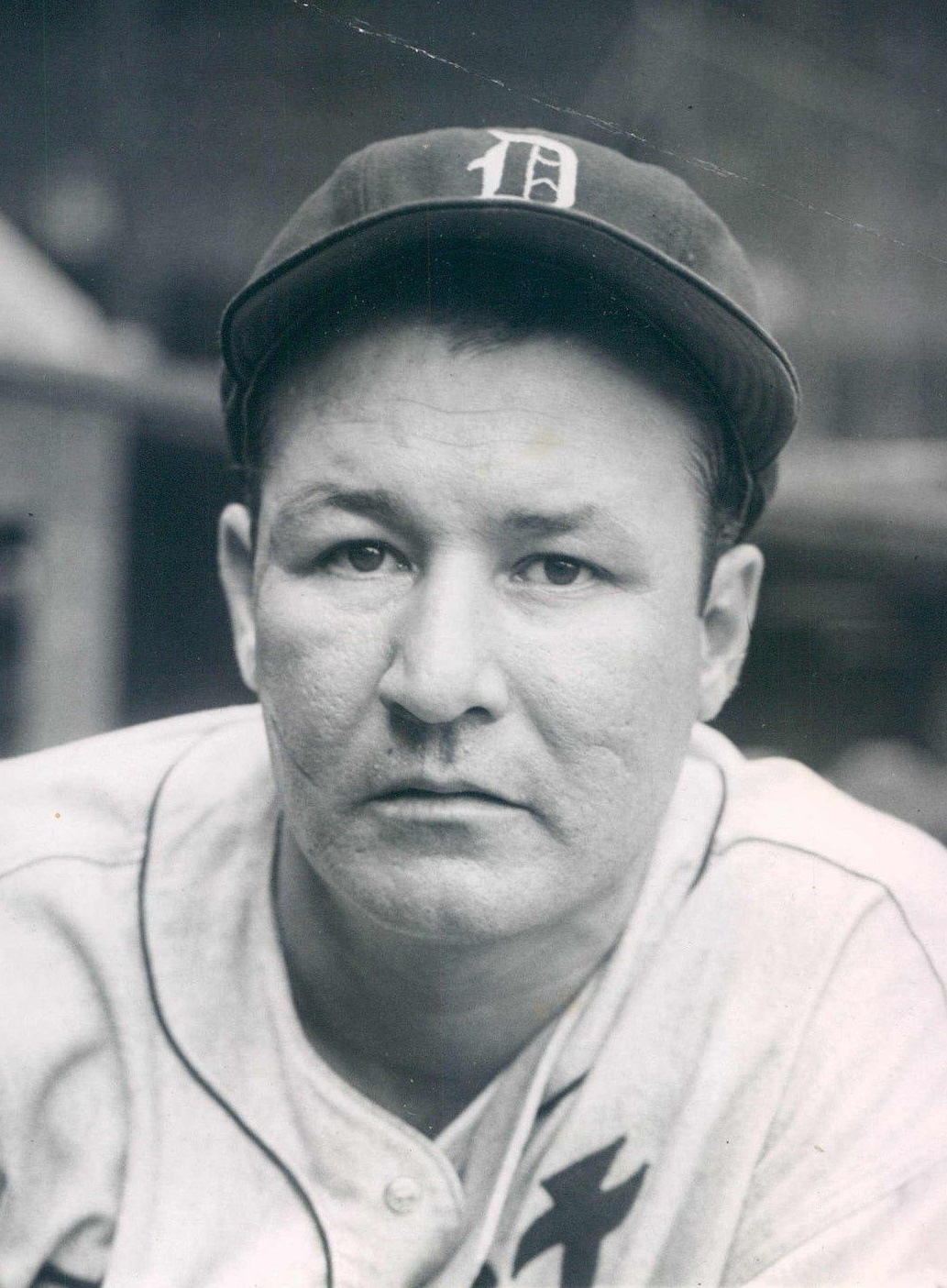
Rudy York was first base coach from 1959 through 1962.

- Herb Pennock: 1936–April 28, 1939
- Hugh Duffy: 1939
- Moe Berg: 1940–1941
- Larry Woodall: 1942–1947
- Earle Combs: 1948–1952
- Del Baker: 1953–1958
- Rudy York: 1959–1962
- Harry Malmberg: 1963–1964
- Pete Runnels: 1965–1966
- Bobby Doerr: 1967–1969
- Don Lenhardt: 1970–1973
- Eddie Popowski: 1974
- Johnny Pesky: 1975–1979
- Tommy Harper: 1980–1984
- Joe Morgan: 1985
- Walt Hriniak: 1986–1987
- Al Bumbry: 1988–1993
- Frank White: 1994–1996
- Dave Jauss: 1997–1999
- Tommy Harper: 2000–2002
- Dallas Williams: 2003
- Lynn Jones: 2004–2005 (leave of absence during May–July 2004)
  - Bill Haselman: May 6, 2004 – July 22, 2004 (interim)
- Bill Haselman: 2006
- Luis Alicea: 2007–2008
- Tim Bogar: 2009
- Ron Johnson: 2010–2011 (leave of absence final during two months of 2010)
  - Rob Leary: August 1, 2010 – end of season (interim)
- Alex Ochoa: 2012
- Arnie Beyeler: 2013–2015
- Rubén Amaro Jr.: 2016–2017
- Tom Goodwin: 2018–2021
- Ramón Vázquez: 2022
- Kyle Hudson: 2023
- Andy Fox: 2024
- José David Flores: 2025 – April 26, 2026
- Pablo Cabrera: April 27, 2026 – present (interim)

== Hitting coach ==
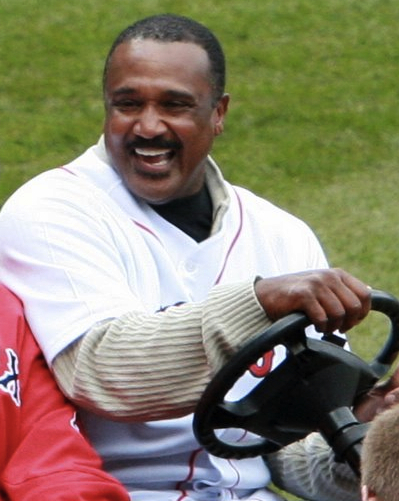
Hall of Famer Jim Rice was hitting coach from 1995 through 2000.

- Rudy York: 1959–1962
- Bobby Doerr: 1967–1969
- Johnny Pesky: 1980–1984
- Walt Hriniak: 1985–1988
- Richie Hebner: 1989–1991
- Rick Burleson: 1992
- Mike Easler: 1993–1994
- Jim Rice: 1995–2000
- Rick Down: 2001
- Dwight Evans: 2002
- Ron Jackson: 2003–2006
- Dave Magadan: 2007–2012
- Greg Colbrunn: 2013–2014 (leave of absence during June 2014)
  - Tim Hyers: June 5, 2014 – June 29, 2014 (interim)
- Chili Davis: 2015–2017
- Tim Hyers: 2018–2021
- Peter Fatse: 2022 – April 25, 2026
- John Soteropoulos: April 27, 2026 – present

=== Assistant hitting coach ===
- Vic Rodriguez: 2013–2017
- Andy Barkett: 2018–2019
- Peter Fatse: 2020–2021
- Luis Ortiz: 2022–2024
- Ben Rosenthal: 2022–2025
- Dillon Lawson: 2025 – April 25, 2026
- John Soteropulos: 2026 – April 26, 2026

== Pitching coach ==
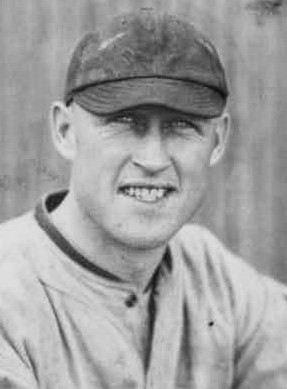
In 1921, Jimmy Burke, who played in the major leagues between 1898 and 1905, was the first Red Sox pitching coach.

- Jimmy Burke: 1921–1923
- Jack Ryan: 1923–1927
- Jack Onslow: 1934
- Herb Pennock: 1936–April 28, 1939
- Frank Shellenback: 1940–1944
- Bill McKechnie: 1952–1953
- Joe Dobson: May 11, 1954 – July 2, 1954
- Dave Ferriss: 1955–1959
- Sal Maglie: 1960–1962, 1966–1967
- Harry Dorish: 1963
- Bob Turley: 1964
- Mace Brown: 1965
- Darrell Johnson: 1968–1969
- Charlie Wagner: 1970
- Harvey Haddix: 1971
- Lee Stange: 1972–1974, 1981–1984
- Stan Williams: 1975–1976
- Al Jackson: 1977–1979
- Johnny Podres: 1980
- Bill Fischer: 1985–1991
- Rich Gale: 1992–1993
- Mike Roarke: 1994
- John Cumberland: 1995 – July 19, 1995
- Al Nipper: July 19, 1995 – May 1, 1996
- Sammy Ellis: May 1, 1996 – end of season
- Joe Kerrigan: 1997 – August 16, 2001
- John Cumberland: August 16, 2001 – September 4, 2001
- Ralph Treuel: September 4, 2001 – end of season
- Tony Cloninger: 2002 – May 29, 2003 (on leave during April 2003)
  - Goose Gregson: April 5, 2003 – April 22, 2003 (interim); May 30, 2003 – June 8, 2003 (interim)
- Dave Wallace: June 9, 2003 – 2006 (on leave for first four months of 2006 season)
  - Al Nipper: 2006 – August 8, 2006 (interim)
- John Farrell: 2007–2010
- Curt Young: 2011
- Bob McClure: 2012 – August 20, 2012
- Randy Niemann: August 20, 2012 – end of season
- Juan Nieves: 2013 – May 7, 2015
- Carl Willis: May 9, 2015 – 2017
- Dana LeVangie: 2018–2020
- Dave Bush: 2020–2023
- Andrew Bailey: 2024–present

=== Assistant pitching coach ===
- Randy Niemann: 2012 – August 20, 2012
- Brian Bannister: July 6, 2016 – 2019

== Bullpen coach ==
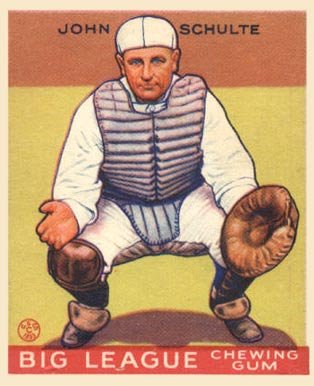
Johnny Schulte was bullpen coach in 1949.

- Johnny Schulte: 1949
- George Susce: 1950–1954
- Mickey Owen: 1955–1956
- Len Okrie: 1961–1962
- Al Lakeman: 1963–1964
- Len Okrie: 1965–1966
- Al Lakeman: 1967 – June 9, 1969
- George Thomas: June 10, 1969 – end of season
- Doug Camilli: 1970–1973
- Don Bryant: 1974–1976
- Walt Hriniak: 1977–1984
- Tony Torchia: 1985
- Joe Morgan: 1986
- Rac Slider: 1987 – July 10, 1988
- Jerry McNertney: July 15, 1988–end of season
- Dick Berardino: 1989–1990
- John McLaren: 1991
- Gary Allenson: 1992–1993
- John Wathan: 1994
- Herm Starrette: 1995
- Dave Carlucci: 1996–May 1, 1996
- Herm Starrette: May 1, 1996–1997
- Dick Pole: 1998
- John Cumberland: 1999 – August 15, 2001
- Dana LeVangie: August 16, 2001 – end of season
- Bob Kipper: 2002
- Euclides Rojas: 2003–2004
- Bill Haselman: 2005
- Al Nipper: 2006 (served as interim pitching coach for first four months of the season)
  - Ralph Treuel: 2006–August 8, 2006 (interim)
- Gary Tuck: 2007–2012
- Dana LeVangie: 2013–2017 (on leave for final two months of 2015 season)
  - Bob Kipper: August 16, 2015 – end of 2015 season (interim)
- Craig Bjornson: 2018–2020
- Kevin Walker: 2021–2024
- Chris Holt: 2025–present

== Others ==
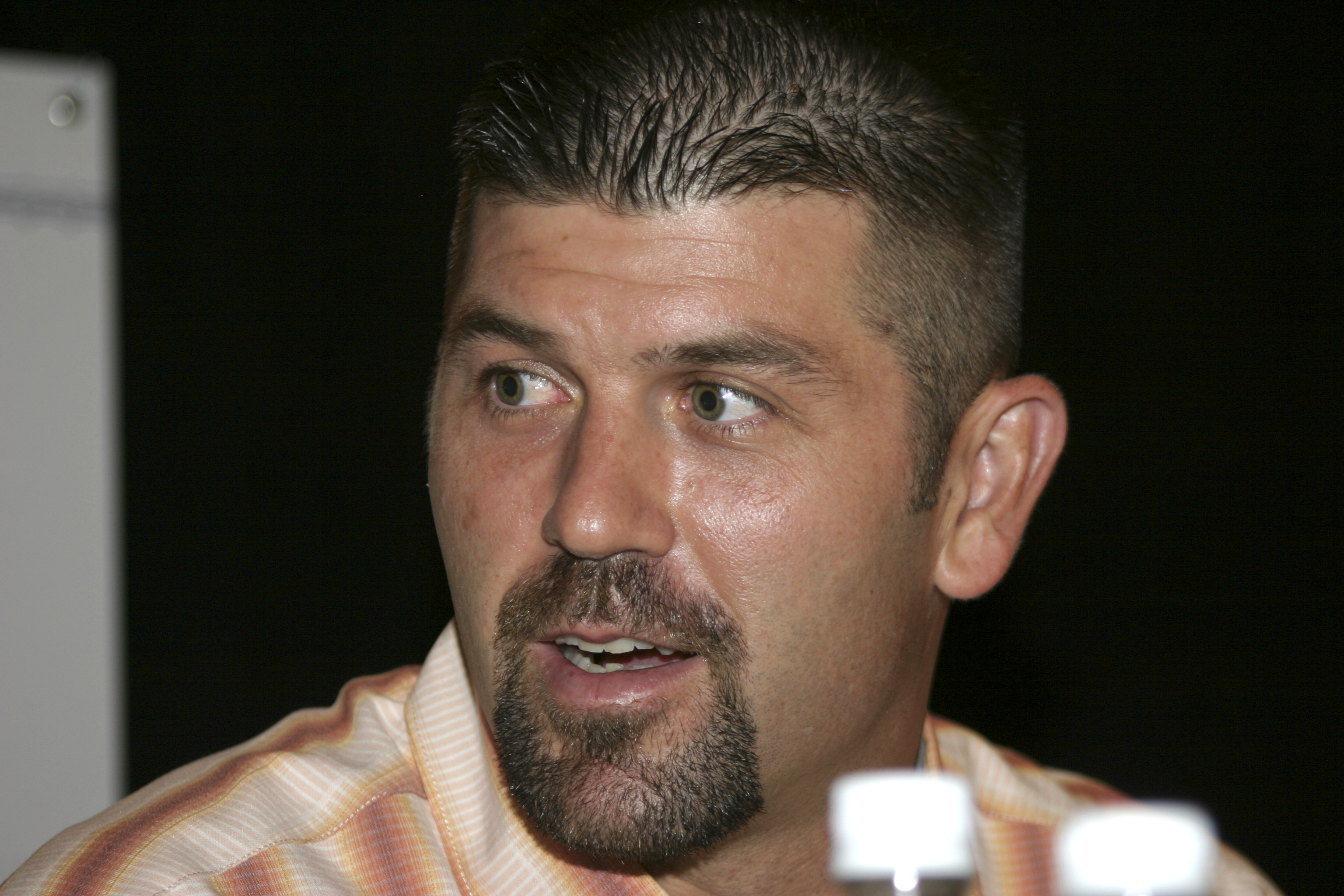
Former Red Sox catcher Jason Varitek spent several seasons as a coach.

=== Active ===
- Parker Guinn: 2024–present (Catching)
- Devin Rose: 2026–present (Pitching Strategist)
- Collin Hetzler: April 26, 2026 – present (Interim Hitting Coach)
- Jack Simonetty: April 27, 2026 – present (Interim Hitting Assistant)

=== Former ===
- Lefty Leifield: 1924–1926
- Heinie Wagner: 1927–1929
- Bob Coleman: 1928
- Jack McCallister: 1930
- Hugh Duffy: 1931
- Rudy Hulswitt: 1931–1933
- Bibb Falk: 1934
- Tom Daly: 1933–1936, 1944–1946
- Moe Berg: 1939
- Paul Schreiber: 1946–1958 (batting practice pitcher)
- Tom Carey: 1946–1947
- Larry Woodall: 1948
- Johnny Schulte: 1950
- Del Baker: 1959–1960
- Eddie Popowski: 1975 (Special Assignment)
- Nelson Norman: 2001 (Infield Coach)
- Ramón Vázquez: 2018–2020 (Coach)
  - Vázquez's responsibilities were described as "coordinated statistical analysis and advanced scouting data"
- Ramón Vázquez: 2021 (Quality Control Coach/Interpreter)
- Andy Fox: 2022–2023 (Field Coordinator)
- Jason Varitek: 2021 – April 25, 2026
  - Varitek was Game Planning Coordinator during 2021–2022
  - Varitek was also Catching coach during 2022
  - Varitek was Player Information coach during 2023–2026
- Joe Cronin: start of season – April 25, 2026 (Hitting Strategist)

== Notes ==
- For the 1923 season, both Jimmy Burke and Jack Ryan were listed as pitching coaches.
- Herb Pennock resigned as pitching/1st base coach on April 28, 1939, to become Assistant Supervisor of Boston farm system. He was succeeded by Hugh Duffy.
- For the 1947 to 1958 seasons, Paul Schreiber is listed as hitting coach, however other sources note his role as batting practice pitcher, which is consistent with his major league playing experience.
- For the 1959 to 1962 seasons, Rudy York was both the first base coach and hitting coach.
- For the 1967 to 1969 seasons, Bobby Doerr was both the first base coach and hitting coach.
- For 1970, George Thomas is listed as bullpen coach for the full season, however other sources note his coaching role was for a limited time, which is consistent with game logs showing he was an active player for several months.
- On July 19, 1976, Don Zimmer moved from third base coach to manager, and Eddie Popowski replaced him as third base coach.
- At the start of the 1986 season, hitting coach Walt Hriniak also assumed the duties of first base coach when Joe Morgan moved to bullpen coach.
- On July 15, 1988, Joe Morgan moved from third base coach to manager, bullpen coach Rac Slider replaced him as third base coach, and Jerry McNertney became the new bullpen coach.
- On July 25, 1992, Don Zimmer moved from third base coach to bench coach, and Rick Burleson assumed the duties of third base coach while still serving as hitting coach.
- On July 19, 1995, Al Nipper replaced John Cumberland as pitching coach.
- On May 1, 1996, pitching coach Al Nipper was reassigned to minor league pitching coordinator and replaced by Sammy Ellis, and bullpen coach Dave Carlucci was reassigned to bullpen catcher and replaced by Herm Starrette.
- On August 16, 2001, bullpen coach John Cumberland replaced Joe Kerrigan as pitching coach when Kerrigan was promoted to manager, and bullpen catcher Dana LeVangie replaced Cumberland as bullpen coach.
- On September 4, 2001, pitching coach John Cumberland was fired and replaced by Ralph Treuel.
- On June 9, 2003, Dave Wallace replaced Tony Cloninger as pitching coach when Cloninger left the team to receive treatment for cancer; Goose Gregson had filled in for Cloninger during April 5–23 and again May 30–June 8.
- During 2004, from May 6 to July 22, Bill Haselman filled in for first base coach Lynn Jones who required eye surgery after accidentally poking himself with a screwdriver.
- During 2006, Dave Wallace missed much of the season due to illness; bullpen coach Al Nipper served as interim pitching coach and Ralph Treuel serving as interim bullpen coach until Wallace's return on August 8.
- In August 2015, due to manager John Farrell's leave of absence for cancer treatment, bench coach Torey Lovullo was elevated to interim manager, bullpen coach Dana LeVangie was elevated to interim bench coach, and Triple-A pitching coach Bob Kipper was promoted to Boston's bullpen coach.
- During the 2021 season, Ramón Vázquez served as interim first base coach for several games during August, and multiple games in late September through the postseason, as Tom Goodwin was unavailable due to COVID-19 protocols.
