= Winston-Salem Dash =

Minor league baseball team in North Carolina

- Founded in 1945; Winston-Salem, North Carolina
Team logo
Cap insignia

Minor league affiliations
- Class: High-A (2021–present)
- Previous classes: Class A-Advanced (1990–2020); Class A (1963–1989); Class B (1949–1962); Class C (1945–1948)
- League: South Atlantic League (2021–present)
- Division: South Division
- Previous leagues: Carolina League (1945–2020)

Major league affiliations
- Team: Chicago White Sox (1997–present)
- Previous teams: Cincinnati Reds (1993–1996); Chicago Cubs (1985–1992); Boston Red Sox (1961–1984); New York Yankees (1955–1956); St. Louis Cardinals (1945–1954, 1957–1960)

Minor league titles
- League titles (12): 1950; 1951; 1964; 1970; 1973; 1976; 1979; 1985; 1986; 1993; 2003; 2026
- Division titles (1): 2026
- Wild card berths (1): 2026

Team data
- Name: Winston-Salem Dash (2009–present)
- Previous names: Winston-Salem Warthogs (1995–2008); Winston-Salem Spirits (1984–1994); Winston-Salem Red Sox (1961–1983); Winston-Salem Red Birds (1957–1960); Winston-Salem Twins (1954–1956); Winston-Salem Cardinals (1945–1953)
- Colors: Purple, black, white
- Mascot: Bolt
- Ballpark: Truist Stadium (2010–present)
- Previous parks: Ernie Shore Field (1956–2009); South Side Park (1945–1955)
- Owner/ Operator: Diamond Baseball Holdings
- General manager: Brian DeAngelis
- Manager: Guillermo Quiroz
- Website: milb.com/winston-salem

The Winston-Salem Dash are a Minor League Baseball team based in Winston-Salem, North Carolina. They compete at the High-A level in the South Atlantic League and have been affiliated with the Chicago White Sox since 1997. The franchise began play in the Carolina League in 1945 as the Winston-Salem Cardinals and later competed as the Twins, Red Birds, Red Sox, Spirits, and Warthogs before adopting the Dash name for the 2009 season.

The franchise has won 11 Carolina League championships, most recently in 2003. The club has played at Truist Stadium since 2010 and has been owned by Diamond Baseball Holdings since 2024.

== History ==
=== Earlier professional baseball in Winston-Salem ===
Professional baseball in Winston-Salem predates the current franchise. Earlier clubs commonly known as the Winston-Salem Twins played intermittently between 1905 and 1942, competing in the Virginia-North Carolina League in 1905, the Carolina Baseball Association from 1908 to 1917, and the Piedmont League from 1920 to 1933 and again from 1937 to 1942. Winston and Salem formally merged in 1913.

=== Cardinals, Twins, and Red Birds (1945–1960) ===
The present franchise joined the newly established Carolina League as a charter member in 1945, playing as the Winston-Salem Cardinals, an affiliate of the St. Louis Cardinals. The Cardinals won consecutive league championships in 1950 and 1951. The 1950 club finished 106–47 and was later recognized as one of the 100 greatest minor league teams of all time.

The club adopted the Winston-Salem Twins name in 1954 and spent the 1955 and 1956 seasons as a New York Yankees affiliate. After South Side Park was damaged by fire near the end of its use, the team moved to the newly built Ernie Shore Field for the 1956 season. The franchise returned to the St. Louis organization in 1957 and competed as the Winston-Salem Red Birds through 1960.

=== Red Sox era (1961–1984) ===
The franchise became a Boston Red Sox affiliate in 1961 and adopted the Winston-Salem Red Sox name. The affiliation lasted for 24 seasons, through 1984. During the Red Sox era, Winston-Salem won Carolina League championships in 1964, 1970, 1973, 1976, and 1979.

After Dennis Bastien purchased the franchise in October 1983, the club adopted its own name and color scheme, becoming the Winston-Salem Spirits for the 1984 season. It remained affiliated with Boston that year and became a Chicago Cubs affiliate in 1985.

=== Spirits and Warthogs (1985–2008) ===
The logo of the Winston-Salem Warthogs, used from 1995 to 2008

The Spirits won consecutive Carolina League championships in their first two seasons as a Cubs affiliate, 1985 and 1986. The Cubs affiliation continued through 1992. In 1993, the franchise became a Cincinnati Reds affiliate and won another league championship. The Reds affiliation lasted through 1996.

After the 1994 season, the name Warthogs was selected through a local newspaper's "Name the Team" contest and became the club's identity in 1995. The name was an apparent reference to the North Carolina Zoo's recent acquisition of warthogs. The Warthogs became a Chicago White Sox affiliate in 1997, beginning an affiliation that has continued since. Winston-Salem won the 2003 Carolina League championship as the Warthogs, the franchise's most recent league title.

=== Dash era (2009–present) ===
In 2008, while planning its move to a new downtown ballpark, the club solicited suggestions for a new identity and received about 3,000 submissions. On December 4, 2008, it announced that it would adopt the Winston-Salem Dash name beginning with the 2009 season. The nickname refers to the punctuation in the city's name, although the mark between "Winston" and "Salem" is technically a hyphen. A separate name-the-mascot contest selected Bolt, a lightning-themed character, as the club's new mascot in March 2009.

Construction delays and an ownership restructuring postponed the downtown ballpark's planned 2009 opening, leaving the Dash at Wake Forest Baseball Park for the entire season. The Dash began play at the new BB&T Ballpark on April 13, 2010. Winston-Salem reached the Carolina League championship series in 2010 and 2012, losing both series three games to one.

Before the 2021 reorganization of Minor League Baseball, Winston-Salem had been the only franchise to compete in every Carolina League season since the circuit's establishment in 1945. As part of Major League Baseball's restructuring that year, the Dash were assigned to High-A East at the High-A classification. The circuit restored the historical South Atlantic League name in 2022. In 2023, the club acknowledged the distinction through its Winston-Salem Hyphens alternate identity, which it used for one home game.

Billy Prim had owned the franchise since 2003 and served as managing partner of its ownership group. In April 2024, Diamond Baseball Holdings (DBH) purchased the Dash, marking the franchise's first ownership change in more than two decades. DBH retained the club's existing employees, including president and general manager Brian DeAngelis, who remained in that position after the sale. The Dash continued to play at the city-owned Truist Stadium and remained the High-A affiliate of the Chicago White Sox.

== Ballparks ==
=== South Side Park (1945–1955) ===
From 1945 through 1955, the franchise played at South Side Park, just east of the city's original South Side development. Originally known as Twin City Sportsman's Park, the venue had served local minor-league and amateur baseball since the early 1920s. The ballpark was damaged by fire near the end of its use. In 1955, Charles Babcock donated land for a replacement municipal ballpark, which the city named for former major-league pitcher and Forsyth County sheriff Ernie Shore.

=== Ernie Shore Field (1956–2009) ===
The city leased Ernie Shore Baseball Park to the Winston-Salem Twins in April 1956; it opened that month and was dedicated on May 23. The ballpark's listed capacity increased from 4,028 in 1973 to 4,280 in 1995 and 6,280 by 1998.

The city approved the sale of Ernie Shore Field to Wake Forest University in September 2008. Wake Forest moved its baseball program into the venue before the 2009 season, when the park became known as Gene Hooks Field at Wake Forest Baseball Park. Because completion of the Dash's downtown stadium was delayed, the club played its entire 2009 home schedule at the former Ernie Shore Field. In February 2016, Wake Forest renamed the facility David F. Couch Ballpark, while retaining the Gene Hooks Field name for the playing surface.

=== Downtown stadium (2010–present) ===
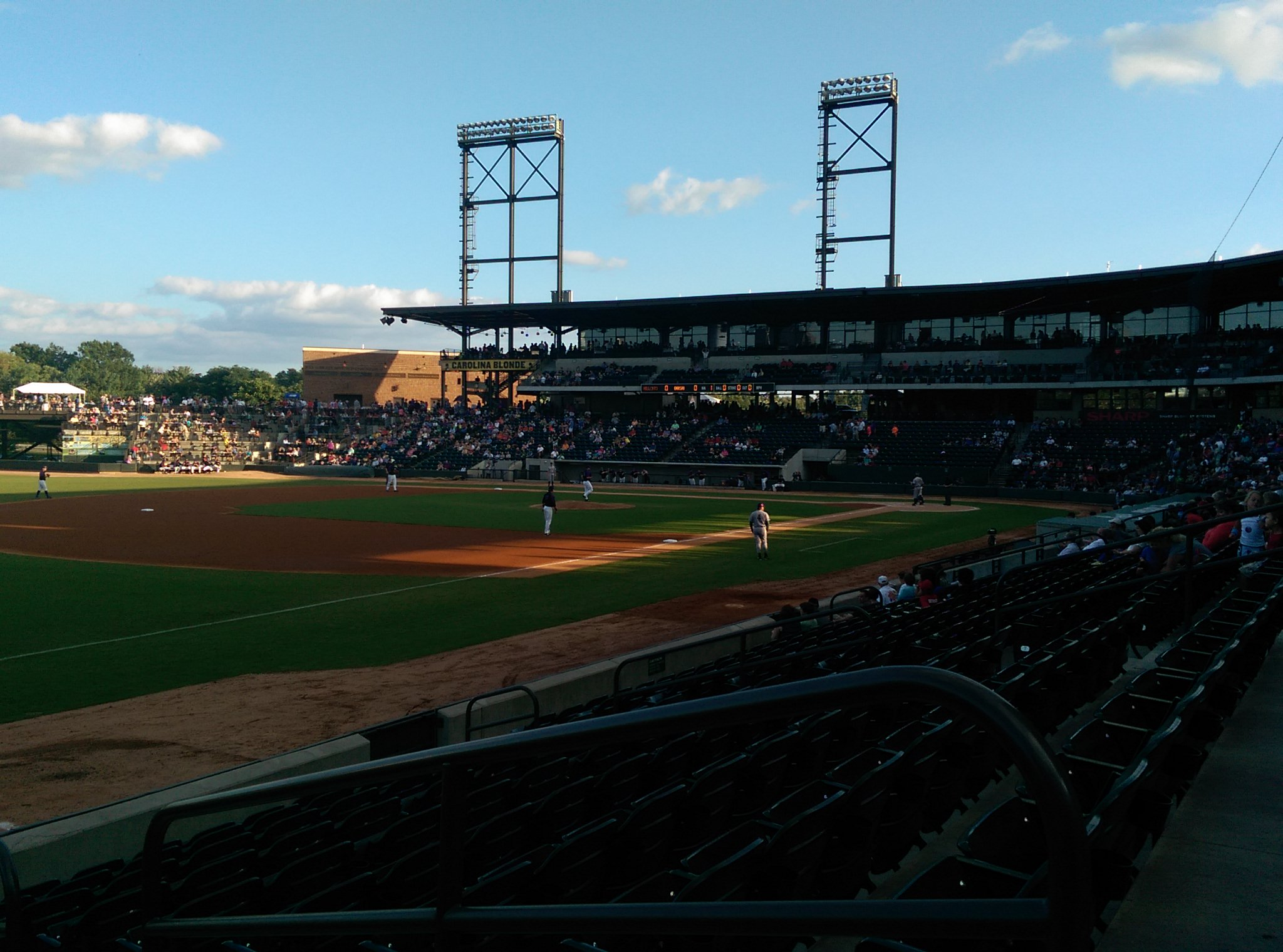
Truist Stadium, then known as BB&T Ballpark, during a baseball game

Delays in construction financing, along with a restructuring of the club's ownership group, postponed the downtown stadium's planned 2009 opening. The city approved continued financing in June 2009, and financing was completed in September. In February 2010, BB&T signed a 15-year naming-rights agreement under which the venue was named BB&T Ballpark. BB&T Ballpark hosted its first Dash game on April 13, 2010, against the Potomac Nationals.

BB&T Ballpark was renamed Truist Stadium on June 18, 2020, as a continuation of the naming-rights partnership. The City of Winston-Salem is the stadium's sole owner and leases it to the team's ownership group under a 25-year agreement.

== Season-by-season records ==
The "League finish" column gives the club's position in the full league standings rather than its divisional position. In seasons that used split-season standings, postseason qualification was based on half-season results; in 1985, the Spirits won the South Division's first half despite finishing eighth in the full-season league standings. Season entries are cited to annual team roster and league standings pages where available; additional contemporary or official sources are used where those databases conflict or do not cover a field.

Season	Record	League finish	Manager	Playoffs	League/notes
1945	61–76	6th	George Smith / George Ferrell		Carolina League; known as the "Cardinals"
1946	68–72	5th	Zip Payne		
1947	85–57	2nd	Zip Payne	Lost in first round	
1948	76–65	5th	Zip Payne		
1949	84–61	2nd	Willie Duke / George Ferrell / Roland LeBlanc	Lost in first round	
1950	106–47	1st	George Kissell	League champions	
1951	81–58	2nd	Harold Olt	League champions	
1952	74–63	3rd	Harold Olt / Jimmy Brown	Lost in first round	
1953	69–70	6th	Jimmy Brown		
1954	44–94	8th	Ralph Hodgin / Herb Brett		Known as "Twins"
1955	65–73	7th	Ken Silvestri / Aaron Robinson		
1956	59–91	8th	George Hausmann / Lee "Pete" Peterson		
1957	72–68	4th	George Kissell		Known as "Red Birds"
1958	69–68	5th	Vern Benson		
1959	67–62	4th	Al Unser (baseball)	Lost in first round	
1960	61–76	5th	Chase Riddle		
1961	68–72	4th	Elmer Yoter (33–37) / Matt Sczesny (35–35)	—	Known as "Red Sox"
1962	76–64	3rd	Eddie Popowski / Mace Brown	Lost in first round	
1963	67–76	7th	Matt Sczesny / Bill Slack		
1964	82–57	1st	Bill Slack	League champions	
1965	65–79	7th	Bill Slack		
1966	82–58	1st	Bill Slack	Lost in league finals	
1967	69–68	6th (t)	Bill Slack		
1968	56–81	9th	Bill Slack		
1969	77–67	4th	Matt Sczesny	Lost in first round	
1970	79–58	1st	Bill Slack	League champions	
1971	67–67	4th	Don Lock		
1972	65–74	5th	Rac Slider		
1973	77–62	2nd	Bill Slack	League champions	
1974	76–61	3rd	Bill Slack		
1975	81–62	2nd	John Kennedy		
1976	80–57	1st	Tony Torchia	League champions	
1977	61–77	4th	Tony Torchia		
1978	55–77	6th	Bill Slack		
1979	85–55	1st	Bill Slack	League champions	
1980	76–64	4th	Buddy Hunter		
1981	72–67	2nd	Buddy Hunter		
1982	45–93	7th	Rac Slider		
1983	74–66	3rd	Bill Slack	Lost in league finals	
1984	58–82	8th	Bill Slack		Known as "Spirits"
1985	58–81	8th	Cal Emery	League champions	
1986	82–56	2nd	Jim Essian	League champions	
1987	72–68	3rd (t)	Jay Loviglio	Lost in first round	
1988	73–67	5th	Jay Loviglio		
1989	64–71	6th	Jay Loviglio		
1990	86–54	2nd	Brad Mills		
1991	83–57	2nd	Brad Mills		
1992	66–73	7th	Bill Hayes		
1993	72–68	3rd (t)	Mark Berry	League champions	
1994	67–70	4th	Mark Berry	Lost in league finals	
1995	69–68	3rd	Mark Berry		Known as "Warthogs"
1996	74–65	3rd	Phillip Wellman		
1997	63–77	7th	Mike Heath (38–53) / Mark Haley (25–24)		
1998	79–60	2nd	Chris Cron	Lost in league finals	
1999	63–75	7th	Jerry Terrell		
2000	68–71	4th	Brian Dayett		
2001	54–86	8th	Wally Backman		
2002	50–90	7th	Razor Shines		
2003	71–67	5th	Razor Shines	League champions	
2004	74–66	4th	Ken Dominguez / Nick Leyva	Lost in first round	
2005	77–64	3rd	Chris Cron	Lost in first round	
2006	66–72	5th	Rafael Santana		
2007	64–74	5th	Tim Blackwell		
2008	71–68	4th	Tim Blackwell	Lost in semifinals	
2009	73–65	3rd	Joe McEwing	Lost in first round	Known as "Dash"
2010	81–58	1st	Joe McEwing	Lost in league finals	
2011	69–71	4th	Julio Vinas		
2012	87–51	1st	Tommy Thompson	Lost in league finals	
2013	71–69	4th	Ryan Newman		
2014	61–78	8th	Tommy Thompson		
2015	75–63	2nd	Tim Esmay	Lost in semifinals	
2016	56–83	6th	Joel Skinner		
2017	56–84	10th	Willie Harris		
2018	84–54	1st	Omar Vizquel	Lost in first round	
2019	72–61	3rd	Justin Jirschele		
2020	—	—	—	—	Season canceled because of the COVID-19 pandemic
2021	43–76	12th	Ryan Newman	—	High-A East
2022	58–74	10th	Lorenzo Bundy	—	South Atlantic League
2023	60–66	10th	Guillermo Quiroz	—	South Atlantic League
2024	60–72	10th	Guillermo Quiroz	—	South Atlantic League
2025	56–74	10th	Pat Leyland	—	South Atlantic League

== Roster ==
Winston-Salem Dash roster
Players	Coaches/Other
Pitchers: 29 Frankeli Arias; 36 Max Banks; 33 Dylan Carmouche; 14 Drew Conover; 10 Trey Cooper; 6 Jake Curtis; 35 Riley Gowens #; 31 Aric McAtee; 32 Drew McDaniel; 22 Jesus Mendez; 21 Mason Moore; 12 Christian Oppor ~; 29 Caedmon Parker; 26 Landen Payne; 45 Carlton Perkins; 25 Jarold Rosado; 27 Justin Sinibaldi; 44 Grant Umberger; 31 Blaine Wynk; 16 Jack Young; Catchers: 46 Jackson Appel; 22 Rylan Galvan; 15 Ben Hartl; Infielders: 1 Roch Cholowsky; 4 Bryce Eblin; 20 Wes Kath; 2 Kyle Lodise; 7 Javier Mogollon; 30 Jeral Pérez; Outfielders: 3 Ely Brown; 23 Derek Cerda; 35 Braden Holcomb; 13 Nick McLain; 17 James Taussig; 19 George Wolkow	Manager: 24 Guillermo Quiroz; Coaches: 8 Tyler Coolbaugh (bench); 41 Jacob Dorris (pitching); -- Logan Jones (performance); 5 Adam Sinkoe (hitting); 60-day injured list: -- Aldrin Batista; 17 Riley Eikhoff; -- Clete Hartzog; 7-day injured list; * On Chicago White Sox 40-man roster; ~ Development list; # Rehab assignment; ∞ Reserve list; ‡ Restricted list; § Suspended list; † Temporarily inactive list; Roster updated September 10, 2026; Transactions; → More rosters: MiLB • South Atlantic League; → Chicago White Sox minor league players

== Notable alumni ==
The following Winston-Salem alumni have been inducted into the National Baseball Hall of Fame or have won a Cy Young Award.

Player	Winston-Salem season	Principal distinction
Wade Boggs	1977	National Baseball Hall of Fame inductee (2005)
Earl Weaver	1950	National Baseball Hall of Fame inductee as a manager (1996)
Jim Lonborg	1964	1967 American League Cy Young Award
Sparky Lyle	1965	1977 American League Cy Young Award
Chris Sale	2010	2024 National League Cy Young Award
