= Bristol Red Sox =

- 1973–1982; Bristol, Connecticut

Minor league affiliations
- Class: Double-A (1973–1982)
- League: Eastern League (1973–1982)

Major league affiliations
- Team: Boston Red Sox (1973–1982)

Minor league titles
- League titles (3): 1975; 1978; 1981

Team data
- Name: Bristol Red Sox (1973–1982)
- Ballpark: Muzzy Field (1973–1982)

The Bristol Red Sox baseball club was an American minor league baseball franchise. Based in Bristol, Connecticut, it was the Double-A Eastern League farm system affiliate of the Boston Red Sox for ten seasons (1973–82) and played at Muzzy Field.

== Successor to original "PawSox" ==
The team was created during the 1972–73 offseason, when the parent Red Sox decided to move their Triple-A franchise, the Louisville Colonels, to Pawtucket, Rhode Island, home of the Sox' Eastern League farm team, the Pawtucket Red Sox, since 1970.

The Double-A PawSox' owner, Joe Buzas, selected Bristol as the site for his relocated EL franchise. The city had previously hosted the Bristol Owls of the Class B Colonial League in 1949–50 (the league disbanded on July 14, 1950) and the Tramps, Bellmakers and Woodchoppers of the Connecticut State League at the turn of the 20th century (1897; 1899–1901).

== Nine winning seasons in ten years ==
Despite the presence of future Boston stars Jim Rice and Fred Lynn on the 1973 squad, the maiden season of the Bristol Red Sox was a losing one — but the next nine editions of the club sported over .500 records and won Eastern League titles in 1975, 1978 and 1981. Other future MLB or Red Sox stars who played for Bristol included Marty Barrett, Wade Boggs, Oil Can Boyd, Steve Crawford, Bo Díaz, Rich Gedman, Butch Hobson, Bruce Hurst, Steve Lyons, Al Nipper, Bob Stanley, Dave Stapleton, John Tudor and Ernie Whitt.

Managers included former Major Leaguers Stan Williams, Dick McAuliffe and John Kennedy, but the most successful Bristol skipper was veteran minor league player and skipper Tony Torchia, who piloted the club for its final five seasons, winning two championships.

== Relocation to New Britain (1983–2015), Hartford (2016-present) ==
The franchise shifted to New Britain, Connecticut, in 1983, where it played for 33 years, the last 21 as the Rock Cats. The New Britain franchise, now a Colorado Rockies' affiliate, officially moved to nearby Hartford as the Yard Goats in 2016. Since 2003, the Red Sox' Eastern League affiliate has been the Portland Sea Dogs.

== Annual record ==
Year	Record	Finish Full Season	Attendance	Manager	Postseason
1973	62–77	Third (American Div.)	47,288	Rac Slider	DNQ
1974	74–61	First (American Div.)	47,989	Stan Williams	Lost in first round
1975	81–57	Second	42,238	Dick McAuliffe; Bill Slack	League champions
1976	74–60	Second (Southern Div.)	38,637	John Kennedy	DNQ
1977	72–67	Fourth (Southern Div.)	57,563	John Kennedy	DNQ
1978	72–66	Third	64,921	Tony Torchia	League champions
1979	73–66	Third	66,844	Tony Torchia	DNQ
1980	79–60	First (Southern Div.)	65,991	Tony Torchia	DNQ
1981	72–66	Second (Southern Div.)	77,066	Tony Torchia	League champions
1982	75–65	Second (Southern Div.)	67,564	Tony Torchia	DNQ

Preceded by Pawtucket Red Sox	Boston Red Sox; Double-A affiliate 1973–1982	Succeeded by New Britain Red Sox
