= Tony Torchia =

American baseball player, coach, and manager (1943–2021)

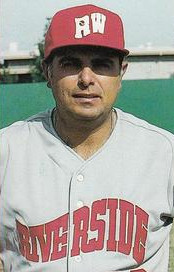
- Torchia in 1988
- Coach
- Born: December 13, 1943; Chicago, Illinois, United States
- Died: September 24, 2021 (aged 77); Tucson, Arizona, United States
- Batted: Right Threw: Left
- Stats at Baseball Reference

Teams
- As coach: Boston Red Sox (1985)

Anthony Lewis Torchia (December 13, 1943 – September 24, 2021) was an American Major League Baseball coach and minor league player and manager. The Chicago native was a left-handed throwing, right-handed batting first baseman who played 13 seasons in the minors.

== Biography ==
Torchia was signed by the Los Angeles Dodgers after playing for Miami Dade College. He was drafted by the Boston Red Sox after his rookie season, 1962, and he would spend 23 years in the Boston organization. Torchia played in 1,435 minor league games and batted .294 with 89 home runs.

Torchia holds the distinction of having been the only man who has served as a player, coach and manager of the Pawtucket Red Sox. After he retired as a player in 1974, he coached for the "PawSox" in 1975 (under skipper Joe Morgan). He then managed Boston farm clubs from 1976 to 1984, ranging from Class A to Triple A. His first team, the Winston-Salem Red Sox, won the 1976 Carolina League pennant. He skippered the Bristol Red Sox of the Double-A Eastern League for five seasons (1978–82), winning league titles in 1978 and 1981. Torchia returned to Pawtucket as the third manager in the club's Triple-A history in 1983. He spent two seasons there, winning the 1984 Governors' Cup, emblematic of the championship of the International League.

Torchia then was named bullpen coach for the Boston Red Sox in 1985, his only full campaign in Major League Baseball. He managed Boston's Double-A New Britain farm club in 1986 before leaving the organization for good. He later sued the Red Sox and co-owner Haywood Sullivan, claiming he was demoted and subsequently fired for seeking psychotherapy for depression in 1985.

Beginning in 1987, Torchia coached and managed at the minor league level for the San Diego Padres, Colorado Rockies, Houston Astros and Montreal Expos. His 1988 Riverside Red Wave, a San Diego affiliate, won the Class A California League championship. Torchia later managed the Asheville Tourists of the South Atlantic League in 1994, the Brevard County Manatees of the Florida State League in 2002, and finally the Mid-Missouri Mavericks in the independent Frontier League in 2003.

He died on September 24, 2021.

Preceded by John Kennedy	Bristol Red Sox manager 1978–1982	Succeeded by Franchise relocated
Preceded by Joe Morgan	Pawtucket Red Sox manager 1983–1984	Succeeded by Rac Slider
Preceded by Walt Hriniak	Boston Red Sox bullpen coach 1985	Succeeded by Joe Morgan
Preceded by Ed Nottle	New Britain Red Sox manager 1986	Succeeded by Dave Holt
