= Doug Camilli =

American baseball player (1936–2026)

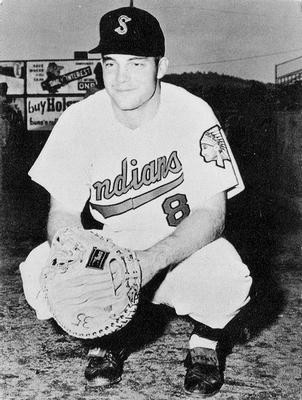
- Camilli with the Spokane Indians in 1961
- Catcher
- Born: September 22, 1936; Philadelphia, Pennsylvania, U.S.
- Died: March 17, 2026 (aged 89); Vero Beach, Florida, U.S.
- Batted: Right Threw: Right

MLB debut
- September 25, 1960, for the Los Angeles Dodgers

Last MLB appearance
- September 14, 1969, for the Washington Senators

MLB statistics
- Batting average: .199
- Home runs: 18
- Runs batted in: 80
- Stats at Baseball Reference

Teams
- Los Angeles Dodgers (1960–1964); Washington Senators (1965–1967, 1969)

Career highlights and awards
- World Series champion (1963)

Douglas Joseph Camilli (September 22, 1936 – March 17, 2026) was an American catcher and coach who played in Major League Baseball (MLB) from 1960 to 1969 for the Los Angeles Dodgers and Washington Senators. Camilli threw and batted right-handed, stood 5 feet 11 inches (1.80 m) tall, and weighed 195 pounds (88 kg) during his active career.

== Career ==
The son of All-Star slugger and first baseman Dolph Camilli and his first wife Ruth, he was born in Philadelphia during his father's tenure with the Philadelphia Phillies, one of seven children. Camilli graduated from Santa Rosa High School and attended Stanford University before signing in 1957 with the Brooklyn Dodgers, for whom his father won the National League Most Valuable Player Award in 1941.

Camilli made his major league debut on September 25, 1960, against the San Francisco Giants. He pinch-hit for catcher John Roseboro in the 2nd inning and caught the remainder of the game, recording his first career hit against future Hall of Fame pitcher Juan Marichal.

In 1962, his first full season in the Majors, Camilli appeared in 45 games, backing up Roseboro and Norm Sherry, and batting a career-high .284 with four home runs and 22 runs batted in. He won a World Series ring as a member of the 1963 Dodgers, but did not appear in that year's Fall Classic, a four-game sweep over the New York Yankees.

He caught the third of Sandy Koufax's four career no-hitters on June 4, 1964. Koufax faced the minimum 27 batters. Koufax allowed only one baserunner, just missing out on a perfect game, and struck out 12 while beating the Phillies, 3–0, at Connie Mack Stadium. On November 30, 1964, Camilli's contract was sold to the Washington Senators.

Camili played a career-high 75 games for Washington in 1965, but injuries shortened his season and the next. After playing just 30 games in 1968, Camili retired to serve as a bullpen coach for the Senators. Injuries caused Camili to be activated in September 1969 and he appeared in one final game as a catcher on September 14 against the Detroit Tigers.

Appearing in 313 games over all or parts of nine seasons, Camilli collected 153 hits, including 18 home runs and 22 doubles, and recorded a .984 fielding percentage and 40% caught stealing percentage.

Camilli went on to join the Boston Red Sox (1970–73) as a full-time bullpen coach, and later became a manager, coach, and roving catching instructor in the Red Sox farm system until 1992. Among the players he managed in the Boston system was one his three sons, Kevin Camili.

== Death ==
Camilli died at his home in Vero Beach, Florida, on March 17, 2026, at the age of 89.

== See also ==
- List of second-generation Major League Baseball players

Sporting positions
Preceded by George Susce	Washington Senators Bullpen Coach; 1968–1969	Succeeded by George Susce
Preceded by George Thomas	Boston Red Sox Bullpen Coach; 1970–1973	Succeeded by Don Bryant
