= Harry Malmberg =

American baseball player (1925–1976)

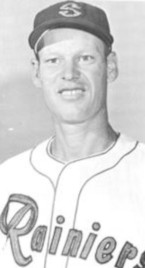
- Second baseman
- Born: July 31, 1925; Fairfield, Alabama, U.S.
- Died: October 29, 1976 (aged 51); San Francisco, California, U.S.
- Batted: Right Threw: Right

MLB debut
- April 12, 1955, for the Detroit Tigers

Last MLB appearance
- September 11, 1955, for the Detroit Tigers

MLB statistics
- Batting average: .216
- Hits: 45
- Runs batted in: 19
- Stats at Baseball Reference

Teams
- Detroit Tigers (1955)

Harry William Malmberg (July 31, 1925 – October 29, 1976) was an American second baseman and coach in Major League Baseball, and a longtime player and manager in minor league baseball. Born in Fairfield, Alabama, and raised in Pittsburg, California, Malmberg batted and threw right-handed, stood 6 ft 1 in (1.85 m) (185 cm) tall and weighed 170 pounds (77 kg) during his active career.

Malmberg spent only three seasons at the Major League level during a 29-year career in professional baseball. Originally a member of the Cleveland Indians farm system, he reached Triple-A with the San Diego Padres of the Pacific Coast League in 1951, and spent the 11 of the next 12 years at the top level of the minors, toiling also for the Indianapolis Indians, Charleston Senators and Minneapolis Millers of the American Association, and the PCL's San Francisco Seals and Seattle Rainiers. The exception was the 1955 season, when Malmberg, turning age 30, spent a full season for the Detroit Tigers, appearing in 67 games, and compiling a batting average of .216 with five doubles, two triples, no home runs and 19 runs batted in.

Malmberg played in the Boston Red Sox farm system in 1957–58, and rejoined it when the Red Sox took over as the Seattle Rainiers' parent club in 1961. Malmberg served as a playing coach for Rainiers manager Johnny Pesky, who was promoted to pilot of the Red Sox following the 1962 season. Malmberg followed Pesky to Boston as his first-base coach for the 1963 and 1964 seasons. After Pesky's firing at the end of 1964, Malmberg embarked on an 11-year minor league managerial career in the Baltimore Orioles, Kansas City Royals and Oakland Athletics organizations. He managed teams in the Class A California League, Florida State League and Carolina League, the Double-A Eastern League and Southern League, and the Triple-A American Association. He won two league championships (in 1965 and 1971) and retired after the 1975 campaign with a career managerial mark of 744 wins and 783 defeats (.487).

When the Seattle Mariners were formed as an American League expansion team set to begin play in 1977, Malmberg was appointed the club's first third-base coach on the staff of manager Darrell Johnson. But Malmberg was suffering from terminal pancreatic cancer and he died in San Francisco at age 51, five months before the Mariners played their first official game.

Sporting positions
Preceded by Rudy York	Boston Red Sox first-base coach 1963–1964	Succeeded by Pete Runnels
Preceded by Jack McKeon	Omaha Royals manager 1973–1974	Succeeded by Billy Gardner
