= Don Lenhardt =

American baseball player (1922–2014)

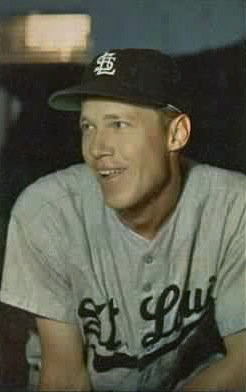
- Lenhardt during his 1952–53 stint with the Browns
- Outfielder / First baseman / Third baseman
- Born: October 4, 1922; Alton, Illinois, U.S.
- Died: July 9, 2014 (aged 91); Chesterfield, Missouri, U.S.
- Batted: Right Threw: Right

MLB debut
- April 18, 1950, for the St. Louis Browns

Last MLB appearance
- September 25, 1954, for the Boston Red Sox

MLB statistics
- Batting average: .271
- Home runs: 61
- Runs batted in: 239
- Stats at Baseball Reference

Teams
- St. Louis Browns / Baltimore Orioles (1950–1951, 1952–1954); Chicago White Sox (1951); Boston Red Sox (1952, 1954); Detroit Tigers (1952)

Donald Eugene Lenhardt (October 4, 1922 – July 9, 2014) was an American outfielder, first baseman, third baseman, scout and coach in Major League Baseball. In his playing days, he stood 6 feet 3 inches (1.91 m) tall, weighed 195 pounds (88 kg), and threw and batted right-handed. He was nicknamed "Footsie" by teammates because he often had difficulty finding shoes that fit him properly.

Lenhardt was born in Alton, Illinois, paternal side of Danube Swabians Ancestry from Austria-Hungary. He attended the University of Illinois and Washington University in St. Louis, and served in the United States Navy, before joining the St. Louis Browns' farm system in 1946, signed by scout Lou Maguolo. Lenhardt led the Illinois–Indiana–Iowa League in home runs in 1948 and was promoted to the major league parent club Browns at the start of the 1950 season at age 27.

He would play in the American League for five seasons (1950–54) for the Browns (twice), Chicago White Sox, Boston Red Sox (twice), Detroit Tigers and Baltimore Orioles, where as a transplanted St. Louis Brown he was a member of the first modern Baltimore MLB team in 1954. In 481 games, he batted .271 with 401 hits, 64 doubles, nine triples, 61 home runs and 239 runs batted in.

After finishing his playing career with Boston farm clubs in 1955–56, Lenhardt became a Midwest-area scout for the Red Sox for over four decades, interrupting that tenure only to serve as first-base coach on Eddie Kasko's staff in Boston from 1970 to 1973. He retired from the Red Sox in 2004, and died at age 91 on July 9, 2014.

Sporting positions
Preceded by Bobby Doerr	Boston Red Sox first-base coach 1970–1973	Succeeded by Eddie Popowski
