= Johnny Schulte =

American baseball player and coach (1896–1978)

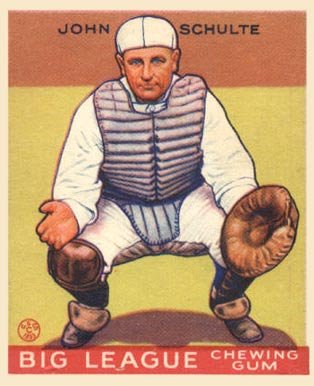
- Catcher
- Born: September 8, 1896; Fredericktown, Missouri, U.S.
- Died: June 28, 1978 (aged 81); St. Louis, Missouri, U.S.
- Batted: Left Threw: Right

MLB debut
- April 18, 1923, for the St. Louis Browns

Last MLB appearance
- September 20, 1932, for the Boston Braves

MLB statistics
- Batting average: .262
- Home runs: 14
- Runs batted in: 64
- Stats at Baseball Reference

Teams
- As player: St. Louis Browns (1923); St. Louis Cardinals (1927); Philadelphia Phillies (1928); Chicago Cubs (1929); St. Louis Browns (1932); Boston Braves (1932); As coach: Chicago Cubs (1933); New York Yankees (1934–1948); Boston Red Sox (1949–1950)

Career highlights and awards
- 7x World Series champion (1936–1939, 1941, 1943, 1947)

John Clement Schulte (September 8, 1896 – June 28, 1978) was an American catcher and longtime coach in professional baseball. A native of Fredericktown, Missouri, Schulte batted left-handed, threw right-handed and was listed as 5 feet 11 inches (1.80 m) tall and 190 pounds (86 kg).

Schulte's professional playing career began in 1915. It lasted for 15 seasons and was interrupted by two years (1917–18) in military service during World War I. He played for five Major League Baseball teams over all or parts of five seasons: the St. Louis Browns (1923 and 1932), St. Louis Cardinals (1927), Philadelphia Phillies (1928), Chicago Cubs (1929) and Boston Braves (1932). Altogether, he appeared in 192 games, hitting .262 with 98 hits, including 15 doubles, four triples and 14 home runs. His best year, as a second-string catcher for the 1927 Cardinals, saw him set personal bests in most offensive categories. In Chicago, he was a reserve catcher on the 1929 National League champions and played under Joe McCarthy, whom he would later serve as a longtime coach.

After his maiden coaching assignment with the Cubs in 1933, Schulte joined McCarthy and the New York Yankees beginning in 1934. He coached 15 full seasons (1934–48) in the Bronx, serving under Bill Dickey, Johnny Neun and Bucky Harris after McCarthy's retirement in May 1946. The Yankees won seven World Series titles and eight American League pennants during Schulte's decade and a half as a coach.

Then, in 1949, he rejoined McCarthy with the Boston Red Sox. When McCarthy retired for the final time on June 23, 1950, Schulte was reassigned to scouting duties by the Red Sox. He coached in minor league baseball for the Yankees' Kansas City Blues Triple-A affiliate before returning to scouting with the Cleveland Indians. In 1961, he scouted Tommy John and brought him to Cleveland for a workout, after which the team signed him.

Schulte also played professional soccer in St. Louis with the Innisfails.

Johnny Schulte died in St. Louis, Missouri, at the age of 81.

== Notes ==
Sporting positions
| Preceded by N/A | Boston Red Sox Bullpen Coach; 1949 | Succeeded by George Susce |
