= Bill Slack =

Canadian baseball player and coach (1933–2025)

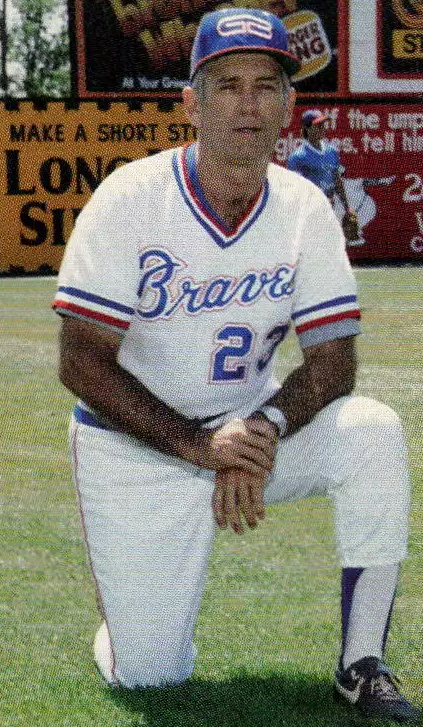
- Slack with the Greenville Braves c. 1986
- Pitcher
- Born: May 3, 1933; Petrolia, Ontario, Canada
- Died: November 9, 2025 (aged 92); Murrells Inlet, South Carolina, U.S.
- Batted: Left Threw: Right

Member of the Canadian

Baseball Hall of Fame
- Induction: 2002

William Henry Slack (May 3, 1933 – November 9, 2025) was a Canadian professional baseball pitcher, manager and coach, and a member of the Canadian Baseball Hall of Fame. Although he never played Major League Baseball, Slack spent 50 years at the minor league level, and was a longtime member of the Boston Red Sox and Atlanta Braves organizations. In his playing days, he threw right-handed, batted left-handed, stood 5 feet 10 inches (1.78 m) tall and weighed 175 pounds (79 kg).

== Pitching career ==
A former minor pro hockey player who toiled in the Montreal Canadiens' organization, Slack signed with the Red Sox in 1952, and won 15 games in his rookie season for the Roanoke Red Sox of the Class B Piedmont League. Slack then joined the Albany Senators of the Class A Eastern League, posting a sparkling 2.22 earned run average in 1954 and winning 16 games (losing 7) with a 2.24 ERA in 1957.

He reached the highest minor league level with the San Francisco Seals and Seattle Rainiers of the Pacific Coast League and the Louisville Colonels, Indianapolis Indians and Minneapolis Millers of the American Association, but pitched in only 70 games over parts of five seasons with those teams. All told, Slack won 79 games and lost 63 (.556) with a 3.45 ERA as a pitcher in the minor leagues. He also was an accomplished batter in those pre-designated hitter days, batting .361 for the 1952 Roanoke club.

== Manager and coach ==
In 1961, Slack began a 24-year career as a manager and roving minor league pitching instructor in the Red Sox farm system. He spent much of that time with the Winston-Salem Red Sox, Boston's Class A Carolina League affiliate, managing them for 13 years (1963–68, 1970, 1973–74, 1978–79 and 1983–84), and winning four pennants. He also led the Bristol Red Sox to the Double-A Eastern League championship in 1975 as a late-season replacement for manager Dick McAuliffe, who had been recalled to Boston as an active player. He won 1,120 games and lost 1,065 (.513) as a manager in the Boston system (not including his brief Bristol tenure).

Slack, who had become a full-time resident of Winston-Salem, joined the Braves in 1985 when the Red Sox left the Carolina League. He served as a minor league pitching coach for Atlanta farm clubs at the Class A and Double-A levels for another 14 years, through 1998. After two years in retirement, he briefly managed the Savannah Sand Gnats of the Class A South Atlantic League in 2001, and was the pitching coach of the Wilmington Blue Rocks of the Carolina League for two seasons (2002–03).

A native of Petrolia, Ontario, Slack was named to the Canadian Baseball Hall of Fame in 2002. The Winston-Salem Dash in his adopted city present the Bill Slack Community Service Award every year in his honor.

== Death ==
Slack died at his home in Murrells Inlet, South Carolina, on November 9, 2025, at the age of 92.

== Sources ==
- Winston-Salem Journal, June 16, 2008
- Boston Red Sox 1983 Organization Sketch Book. Boston: Howe News Bureau, 1983.
- Winston-Salem Warthogs
