= Charlie Hough =

American baseball player (born 1948)

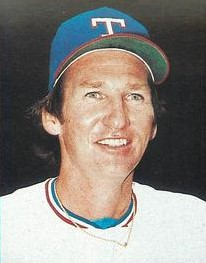
- Hough with the Texas Rangers, 1983
- Pitcher
- Born: January 5, 1948 (age 78); Honolulu, Territory of Hawaii, U.S.
- Batted: Right Threw: Right

MLB debut
- August 12, 1970, for the Los Angeles Dodgers

Last MLB appearance
- July 26, 1994, for the Florida Marlins

MLB statistics
- Win–loss record: 216–216
- Earned run average: 3.75
- Strikeouts: 2,362
- Stats at Baseball Reference

Teams
- As player: Los Angeles Dodgers (1970–1980); Texas Rangers (1980–1990); Chicago White Sox (1991–1992); Florida Marlins (1993–1994); As coach: Los Angeles Dodgers (1998–1999); New York Mets (2001–2002)

Career highlights and awards
- All-Star (1986); Texas Rangers Hall of Fame

Charles Oliver Hough (/ˈhʌf/; born January 5, 1948) is an American former Major League Baseball (MLB) knuckleball pitcher and coach who played for the Los Angeles Dodgers, Texas Rangers, Chicago White Sox, and Florida Marlins from 1970 to 1994.

== Early life ==
Hough was born on January 5, 1948 at the Tripler Army Medical Center in Honolulu of the then Territory of Hawaii to Dick and Paula Hough. Charlie's older brother Richard spent some time in the Boston Red Sox farm system in 1964. The family lived in Greenville, Rhode Island for most of his youth before later moving to Florida. At Hialeah High, he excelled in basketball along with numerous positions in baseball.

== Playing career ==
=== Amateur ===
Hough was drafted out of Hialeah High School in the 8th round of the 1966 Major League Baseball draft by the Los Angeles Dodgers. While in high school, he had spent the summer of 1964 pitching against collegiate competition for the Chatham A's of the Cape Cod Baseball League where he was named a league all-star.

=== Minor leagues ===
After pitching in the low minor leagues from 1967 to 1969 with the Ogden Dodgers, Santa Barbara Dodgers and Albuquerque Dodgers with limited success, Hough's career and fortunes changed dramatically when he learned how to throw a knuckleball in spring training in 1970, leading to a successful season with the Spokane Indians in AAA, where he led the Pacific Coast League in saves and posted a 1.95 ERA.

=== Los Angeles Dodgers ===
He made his major league debut against the Pittsburgh Pirates in 1970 but did not join the Dodgers bullpen full-time until the 1973 season. He became a top reliever for the Dodgers from 1973 until he was sold to the Texas Rangers in 1980. With the Dodgers, he was one of the pitchers who served up one of the three home runs that New York Yankees slugger Reggie Jackson hit on three straight pitches in Game 6 of the 1977 World Series.

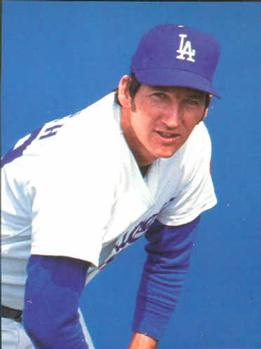
Hough with the Los Angeles Dodgers

=== Texas Rangers ===
After pitching 16 games down the stretch for Texas in the 1980 season, Hough had his first full season for the Rangers with the strike-shortened 1981 season, where he pitched in 21 games (five starts) for 82 innings with a 2.96 ERA. In the 1982 season, at the age of 34, he was converted into a starter fulltime, and he pitched 34 games with 12 complete efforts for 228 innings and a 3.95 ERA.

He was famous for his "dancing knuckleball" pitch that he threw around 80% of the time. Hough complemented his knuckleball with a fastball and slider. He led a handful of pitching categories for the first time in the 1984 season: games started (36), complete games (17), hits allowed (260), and batters faced (1,133). In his last complete game of the season, the opposing pitcher, Mike Witt of the California Angels, hurled a perfect game.

He made the All-Star Game for the only time in 1986.

In 1987, Hough, in battery with Geno Petralli, put Petralli in the record books as Petralli committed four passed balls in one inning to tie the major league record of Ray Katt, catching knuckleballer Hoyt Wilhelm in 1954. The record was tied by Ryan Lavarnway of the Boston Red Sox in 2013, catching knuckleballer Steven Wright in his first major league start. In the July 4 game in the 1988 season, Hough became part of an exclusive club when he recorded four strikeouts in one inning.

He left Texas as the franchise leader in wins (139), strikeouts (1,452), innings pitched (2,308), complete games (98), and losses (123), which all still stand as club records as of 2026.

=== Chicago White Sox ===
He pitched for the Chicago White Sox from 1991 to 1992, where, at 43 years old, he was a teammate of 43-year-old Carlton Fisk.

=== Florida Marlins ===
He joined the expansion Florida Marlins for the 1993 season and started the first regular season game in team history, on April 5, pitching six innings for the win as the Marlins defeated the Dodgers 6–3.

He threw his final complete game on June 14, 1994 for the Marlins against the St. Louis Cardinals, doing so with 127 pitches for a 7–0 victory. It proved to be the last win of his career, as he lost five of his next seven starts. A degenerative hip injury landed him on the disabled list on July 27 that spelled the end of his career at the age of 46. He was the last active player who was born in the 1940s.

=== Career totals ===
During a 25-season career, Hough compiled 216 wins, 216 losses, 2,362 strikeouts and a 3.75 earned run average. His 216 wins rank 86th all-time on the all-time win list, tied with Wilbur Cooper and Curt Schilling. However, Hough also recorded 216 losses, making him the winningest pitcher in history to have lost as many games as he won. He is the only pitcher with both 400 starts and 400 relief appearances in MLB history.

== Coaching career ==
- 1996–1998: Pitching coach for the San Bernardino Stampede
- 1998–1999: Pitching coach for the Los Angeles Dodgers
- 2001–2002: Pitching coach for the New York Mets
- 2006: Pitching coach for the Fullerton Flyers
- 2007–2010: Pitching coach for the Inland Empire 66ers

== See also ==
- List of knuckleball pitchers
- List of Major League Baseball career wins leaders
- List of Major League Baseball career strikeout leaders
- List of Major League Baseball single-inning strikeout leaders
- List of Texas Rangers Opening Day starting pitchers
- List of Major League Baseball career hit batsmen leaders

Sporting positions
Preceded by Glenn Gregson	Los Angeles Dodgers pitching coach 1998–1999	Succeeded by Claude Osteen
Preceded by Dave Wallace	New York Mets pitching coach 2001–2002	Succeeded by Rick Waits
