= Walt Hriniak =

American baseball player (born 1943)

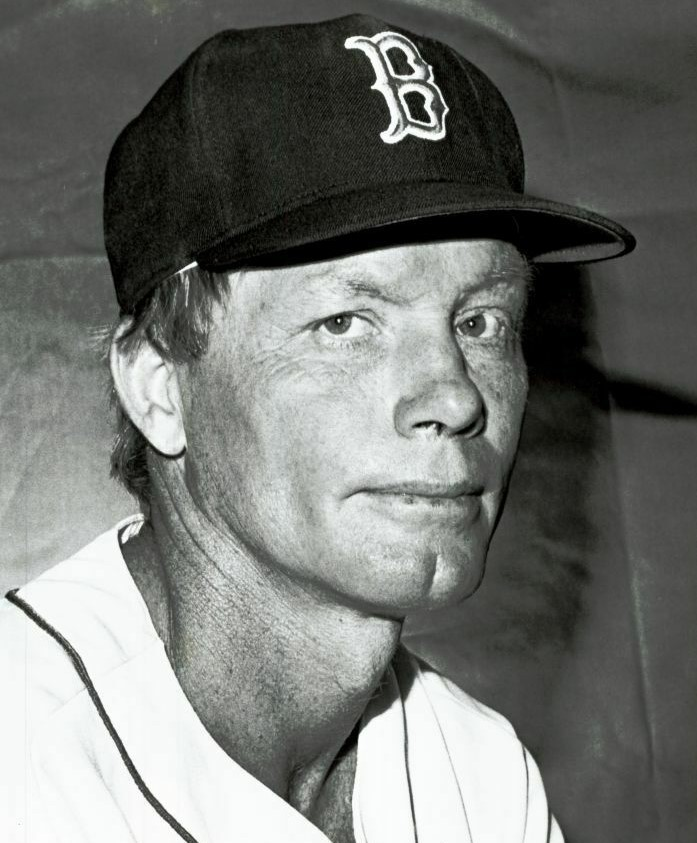
- Catcher
- Born: May 22, 1943 (age 82); Natick, Massachusetts, U.S.
- Batted: Left Threw: Right

MLB debut
- September 10, 1968, for the Atlanta Braves

Last MLB appearance
- September 30, 1969, for the San Diego Padres

MLB statistics
- Batting average: .253
- Hits: 25
- Run batted in: 4
- Stats at Baseball Reference

Teams
- As player: Atlanta Braves (1968–1969); San Diego Padres (1969); As coach: Montreal Expos (1974–1975); Boston Red Sox (1977–1988); Chicago White Sox (1989–1995)

Walter John Hriniak (pronounced RIN-ee-ack) (born May 22, 1943) is an American former catcher in American Major League Baseball who—despite a very brief MLB playing career and a batting average of only .253—became one of the most prominent batting coaches in the game during the last two decades of the 20th century. As a player, he stood 5 feet 11 inches (1.80 m) tall, weighed 178 pounds (81 kg), batted left-handed and threw right-handed. He was born in Natick, Massachusetts.

== Three-sport high school star ==
Hriniak was a three-sport star at Natick High School where he was a first-team All-State selection in all three sports: as quarterback in football, center in hockey, and shortstop in baseball. He was also voted the outstanding hockey player in eastern Massachusetts and some speculated that he could have pursued a career in professional hockey. Instead, he chose baseball and signed a $75,000 bonus contract with the Milwaukee Braves in 1961.

== Professional baseball playing career ==
Initially a shortstop in the pros, Hriniak batted over .300 in each of his first two professional seasons, but in 1964, while playing for the Austin Senators in the Double-A Texas League, he was seriously injured in a car accident that took the life of a teammate (pitcher Jerry Hummitzsch) and was on the disabled list for nearly three months.

It would take Hriniak almost four years to regain his batting stroke. By then, 1968, he had become a catcher and utilityman, and was no longer a top prospect. But during that season, with the Shreveport Braves of the Texas League, Hriniak was managed by Charley Lau, who soon would become the most celebrated batting instructor in Major League Baseball of the 1970s. Hriniak hit .313 and was promoted to the MLB Braves that September; more important, he adopted Lau's theories about hitting and would use them as the basis for his instruction after his playing career had ended. He also became Lau's close friend.

Hriniak would play only those few weeks in 1968 plus the 1969 season at the Major League level, for the Braves (by then based in Atlanta) and the San Diego Padres. He appeared in 47 games, batted 99 times, and hit .253 with no home runs, no extra base hits, and four runs batted in. As of April 2024, his 25 singles is the post-1900 record for all non-pitchers with no extra base hits. By 1972, he had become a minor league manager in the Montreal Expos organization.

== Becoming a batting coach ==
At age 30, Hriniak became a Major League coach for the first time, coaching first base for Gene Mauch's Expos in 1974–75. After Mauch's firing, Hriniak was reassigned to the minor leagues by Montreal in 1976, then was hired as bullpen coach by the Boston Red Sox for the 1977 season. He earned a reputation as a tireless worker, especially as a batting practice pitcher. He threw so many innings of "BP", he damaged his right shoulder permanently.

Although the Red Sox had no formal batting coach until Johnny Pesky's appointment to that job in 1980, some Boston players began approaching Hriniak about his theories on hitting, and he began to work with them before and after games. By the early 1980s, future Baseball Hall of Fame members Carl Yastrzemski and Wade Boggs, as well as All-Stars Dwight Evans and Rich Gedman, were Hriniak disciples. With Pesky's retirement after the 1984 season, Hriniak was promoted to Red Sox batting coach. He concurrently served as first-base coach for the 1986–87 seasons.

== With the Red Sox: Differing philosophies ==
Hriniak's batting theories had many adherents among Red Sox players, but he also had detractors. Ted Williams, the Hall of Fame hitter and all-time Boston great, was outspoken in his criticism of Hriniak's methods. Williams and his followers felt that Hriniak robbed his hitters of extra-base power by teaching them to hit the ball up the middle, "swing down on the ball", or to take the upper hand off the bat at the end of their swing—which may have been oversimplifications of Hriniak's philosophies.

"I don't have a problem with Ted Williams", Hriniak told Yankee Magazine in 1986. "He teaches his way, and I teach mine. I don't teach a level swing, a downward swing, or an uppercut swing. Hitters are all different, so I teach all three ... You don't have to hit my way, you don't have to hit his way. Just make up your minds. Don't keep changing lanes. You can't hit when you're confused."

== White Sox coach ==
Finally, after 12 years with Boston, four as the team's official batting coach, Hriniak moved to the Chicago White Sox in 1989 as one of the highest-paid coaches in baseball. He paid tribute to Charley Lau, who was the White Sox' incumbent hitting coach when he died from cancer at age 50 in 1984, by wearing his mentor's uniform #6 during his Chicago tenure.

Hriniak coached White Sox hitters for seven years, through 1995, before opening his own hitting school and becoming a private batting instructor. Former White Sox slugger Frank Thomas was one of his most loyal adherents. When basketball great Michael Jordan surprised the sports world in 1994 by signing a minor league baseball contract with the White Sox, Hriniak was asked to help him with his batting technique. Jordan's baseball career was a brief one, batting only .202 for the Double-A Birmingham Barons.

In 1989, Hriniak authored A Hitting Clinic: The Walt Hriniak Way, which outlined his theories of batting and included participation from Boggs, Evans and Gedman.

== Awards ==
In June 2010, Hriniak was elected as a charter member of the Natick High School Athletic Hall of Fame in recognition of his many sports achievements while still in high school. In 2004, he was also elected to his high school's Wall of Achievement which honors alumni for their exceptional achievements and contributions to society.

== Bibliography ==
- Allen, Mel, "Hit Man of Fenway Park", Yankee Magazine, September 1986.
- Balzer, Howard, ed., The Baseball Register, 1980 edition. St. Louis: The Sporting News.
- Howe News Bureau, Boston Red Sox 1983 Organization Book.
- Padilla, Doug, Slumping Thomas Turns to Hriniak, Chicago Sun-Times, April 14, 2003.

Sporting positions
Preceded by Larry Doby	Montreal Expos First-Base Coach; 1974–1975	Succeeded by Larry Doby
Preceded by Don Bryant	Boston Red Sox Bullpen Coach; 1977–1984	Succeeded by Tony Torchia
Preceded by Johnny Pesky	Boston Red Sox Hitting Coach; 1985–1988	Succeeded by Richie Hebner
Preceded by Joe Morgan	Boston Red Sox First-Base Coach; 1986–1987	Succeeded by Al Bumbry
Preceded by Cal Emery	Chicago White Sox Hitting Coach; 1989–1995	Succeeded by Bill Buckner
