= George Susce (catcher) =

American baseball player (1907–1986)

- Catcher
- Born: August 13, 1907; Pittsburgh, Pennsylvania, U.S.
- Died: February 25, 1986 (aged 78); Sarasota, Florida, U.S.
- Batted: Right Threw: Right

MLB debut
- April 23, 1929, for the Philadelphia Phillies

Last MLB appearance
- October 1, 1944, for the Cleveland Indians

MLB statistics
- Batting average: .228
- Home runs: 2
- Runs batted in: 22
- Stats at Baseball Reference

Teams
- Philadelphia Phillies (1929); Detroit Tigers (1932); Pittsburgh Pirates (1939); St. Louis Browns (1940); Cleveland Indians (1941–1944)

George Cyril Methodius Susce (August 13, 1907 – February 25, 1986) was an American Major League Baseball catcher for the Philadelphia Phillies (1929), Detroit Tigers (1932), Pittsburgh Pirates (1939), St. Louis Browns (1940) and Cleveland Indians (1941–44). His son, George D., often known as George Susce Jr., was a Major League pitcher.

== Career as player ==
Susce was born in Pittsburgh, Pennsylvania, and attended Schenley High School, where he played both baseball as a catcher and football as a fullback. Upon graduating high school, he tried out for the Philadelphia Phillies. He did not make the team, but left a positive impression on manager Stuffy McInnis. He attended Glenville State College and St. Bonaventure University. He threw and batted right-handed, stood 5 feet 11 1/2 inches (1.816 m) tall and weighed 200 pounds (91 kg). His unusual nickname – "Good Kid" – was given to him as a young player because of his eagerness to help with mundane tasks associated with baseball.

In eight big-league seasons, Susce played in 146 games and had 268 at bats, 23 runs scored, 61 hits, 11 doubles, a triple, two home runs, 22 runs batted in, a stolen base and 25 walks, with a .228 batting average and .301 on-base percentage. In 1940, his last year as a full-time player, Susce appeared in a career-high 61 games for the Browns, starting 37 games at catcher.

== Longtime coach ==
Susce served as a major league bullpen coach for 29 years, for the Indians (1941–49), Boston Red Sox (1950–54), Kansas City Athletics (1955–56), Milwaukee Braves (1958–59) and the expansion Washington Senators/Texas Rangers (1961–67; 1969–72). He managed in the farm systems of the Indians (1948) and Red Sox (1950), but also spent at least parts of those seasons as a major league coach with the parent clubs. In addition, Susce coached for the Triple-A Louisville Colonels and Jacksonville Suns.

Susce died in Sarasota, Florida at the age of 78.

Sporting positions
Preceded by Johnny Schulte	Boston Red Sox Bullpen Coach; 1950–1954	Succeeded by Mickey Owen
