= Ed Nottle =

- Relief pitcher / Coach
- Born: October 22, 1939 (age 87); Philadelphia, Pennsylvania, U.S.
- Bats: Right Throws: Right
- Stats at Baseball Reference

Teams
- As coach: Oakland Athletics (1983)

Edward William Nottle (born October 22, 1939), nicknamed "Singing Ed" because of his avocation as a singer, is an American former Minor League Baseball relief pitcher and manager.

He has led teams in the Oakland Athletics and Boston Red Sox organizations, and managed the independent Brockton Rox. His final season as manager was 2008 with the independent Ottawa Rapidz of the Canadian-American Association of Professional Baseball.

== Playing career ==
Nottle signed his first professional contract in 1959 with a team in Pensacola, Florida. Following a stellar season at Pensacola, Nottle began a 10-year run with the Chicago White Sox organization. In 1963, he was assigned to the White Sox major league roster, but never played due to an arm injury, making him a "phantom ballplayer". His final appearance as a player was in 1980, when he made a single two-inning appearance for the Double-A West Haven Whitecaps. In 18 minor league seasons, he appeared in 543 games, compiling an 89–75 record with a 3.09 ERA.

== Post-playing career ==
In 1972, Nottle received his first coaching job and became a manager in 1978 when the Athletics hired him to manage a Northwest League team. In 1981 while managing the Athletics' Triple-A team in Tacoma, his team reached the Pacific Coast League finals and Nottle was named Minor League Manager-of-the-Year by Baseball America. During the 1983 season, he served as a coach on the Oakland A's major league staff. Within the same year Nottle showcased his singing talent by recording the album To Baseball with Love on his private label Nott's Landing Records.

In 1985, Nottle moved on to the Boston Red Sox organization and managed their Double A affiliate, the New Britain Red Sox, for one season and their Triple-A team, the Pawtucket Red Sox, for 4 1/2 years. Nottle led New Britain to the playoffs once and twice took Pawtucket to the postseason. He was named International League Manager of the Year in 1987 and managed the American League affiliates in the inaugural Triple-A All-Star Classic in Buffalo in 1988.

Nottle managed the inaugural season with the Sioux City Explorers of the Northern League in 1993 and stayed with them through the 2000 season. In his eight seasons, he amassed a regular-season record of 343 wins and 318 losses and made the playoffs in 1994 and 1999. Nottle managed the Duluth–Superior Dukes for one season before moving on to the Brockton Rox of the then-Northern League East in 2002. With the Rox, he compiled a 187–175 record and won a championship in 2003. For the 2006 season, Nottle returned to his old post as the Explorer's manager in their inaugural year in the American Association.

Nottle returned to the former Northeast (now Can-Am League) in 2008 as he became the first manager of the expansion Ottawa Rapidz, but after a very poor start to the season, followed by a hot streak that came when Nottle left the team briefly to visit his sick wife, the team's management fired him on July 31, 2008.

In 2010, in Nottle's 50th year in professional baseball, he served as pitching and third base coach on Chris Carminucci's staff with the Brockton Rox of the Canadian-American Association of Professional Baseball. Nottle helped guide the Rox to the second-best overall record in the league, and another playoff appearance.

In 2023, Nottle was inducted into the American Association Hall of Fame.

== Personal life ==
Nicknamed "Singin Ed", Nottle is famous for his charitable work both in the U.S. and Canada. He has raised over several million dollars for various charities (mainly focused on children).

There has been talk of a movie of Nottle's life, called The 26th Man. The movie would highlight his life in the bar scene and tell the story of how he became an alcoholic. It was supposed to be in production in late 2007, but the financial capital never materialized to finance the project; the screenplay is ready to go, awaiting a new production company.

== Notes ==
| Preceded by Rac Slider | Pawtucket Red Sox manager 1986 – June 1990 | Succeeded by Johnny Pesky |
| Preceded by First Manager | Ottawa Rapidz manager 2008 | Succeeded by Tom Carcione |
