= Glenn Gregson =

Goose Gregson
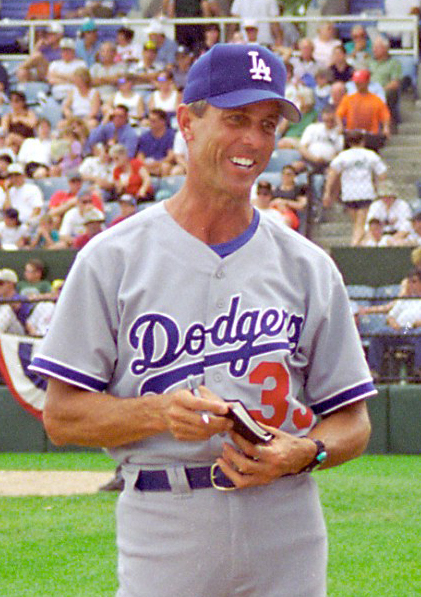
- Gregson in 1998
- Coach
- Born: February 10, 1950 (age 76); Hamlet, North Carolina, U.S.
- Bats: Right Throws: Right
- Stats at Baseball Reference

Glenn Boggs "Goose" Gregson (born February 10, 1950, in Hamlet, North Carolina) is an American professional baseball coach and a former minor league baseball pitcher. He has been a Major League Baseball pitching coach for both the Los Angeles Dodgers and the Boston Red Sox. As of 2022, he is a player development pitching advisor in Boston's system.

== Minor league pitcher ==
Gregson graduated from Hamlet High School and earned bachelor's and M.A. degrees in education at Appalachian State University. A right-handed pitcher, he stood 6 feet 3 inches (1.91 m) and weighed 185 pounds (84 kg).

His minor league career lasted seven seasons in the Chicago White Sox and Philadelphia Phillies' organizations. He entered pro baseball as an undrafted free agent and debuted in 1972 with the Appleton Foxes of the Class A Midwest League, posting a 3.27 earned run average in eight appearances and registering one save. In 1973, Gregson was with Appleton (0–4, one save, 4.67, 16 hits allowed, 33 bases on balls in 27 innings pitched) and the Pulaski Phillies (1–4, 4.62).

He split 1974 between the Auburn Phillies (7–3, five saves, 3.15) and the Spartanburg Phillies (0–2, one save, 1.97). In 1975, Gregson pitched in 52 games for the Rocky Mount Phillies, leading the Carolina League. He went 9–2 with seven saves and a 2.34 ERA and 44 walks in 77 innings of work. He allowed only one home run. Gregson spent his last three years as a player with the Reading Phillies. In 1976, he was 0–6 with five saves and a 2.69 ERA. The next year, his record was 1–2 with a 6.83 ERA. Finally, in 1978, he was 2–1 with a 6.21 ERA.

In 192 minor league games pitched (all but 15 in relief) he compiled a record of 20–24 with an ERA of 3.62 in 351 innings pitched.

== Minor and Major League coach ==
Gregson coached in the Phillies' farm system from 1979–1981. He then became a minor league pitching coach in the Chicago Cubs' organization from 1982–1984 and in 1987. From 1988–1997, he coached in the minor leagues for the Dodgers, then joined the Major League staff in 1998 as the pitching coach under manager Bill Russell. However, Russell was fired on June 22 and three days later, Gregson was replaced by Charlie Hough on new skipper Glenn Hoffman's staff.

Gregson returned to the Phillies as roving minor league pitching coordinator (1999–2000) and coach for the Triple-A Scranton/Wilkes-Barre Red Barons (2001). He moved to the Red Sox system as Boston's minor league pitching coordinator (2002–04), but briefly served as interim pitching coach for the MLB Red Sox for two brief periods early in 2003 after illness sidelined Tony Cloninger. He was Boston's Latin American pitching coordinator from 2005–2017. He also worked as a pitching coach for the Rookie-level Gulf Coast Red Sox during this period. He was then the Red Sox' Latin American pitching advisor from 2018–2021.

Preceded by Dave Wallace	Los Angeles Dodgers Pitching Coach; 1998; March 31–June 25	Succeeded by Charlie Hough
Preceded by Tony Cloninger	Boston Red Sox Pitching Coach; 2003; April 5–April 22; May 30–June 8	Succeeded by Dave Wallace
