= Al Nipper =

American baseball player (born 1959)

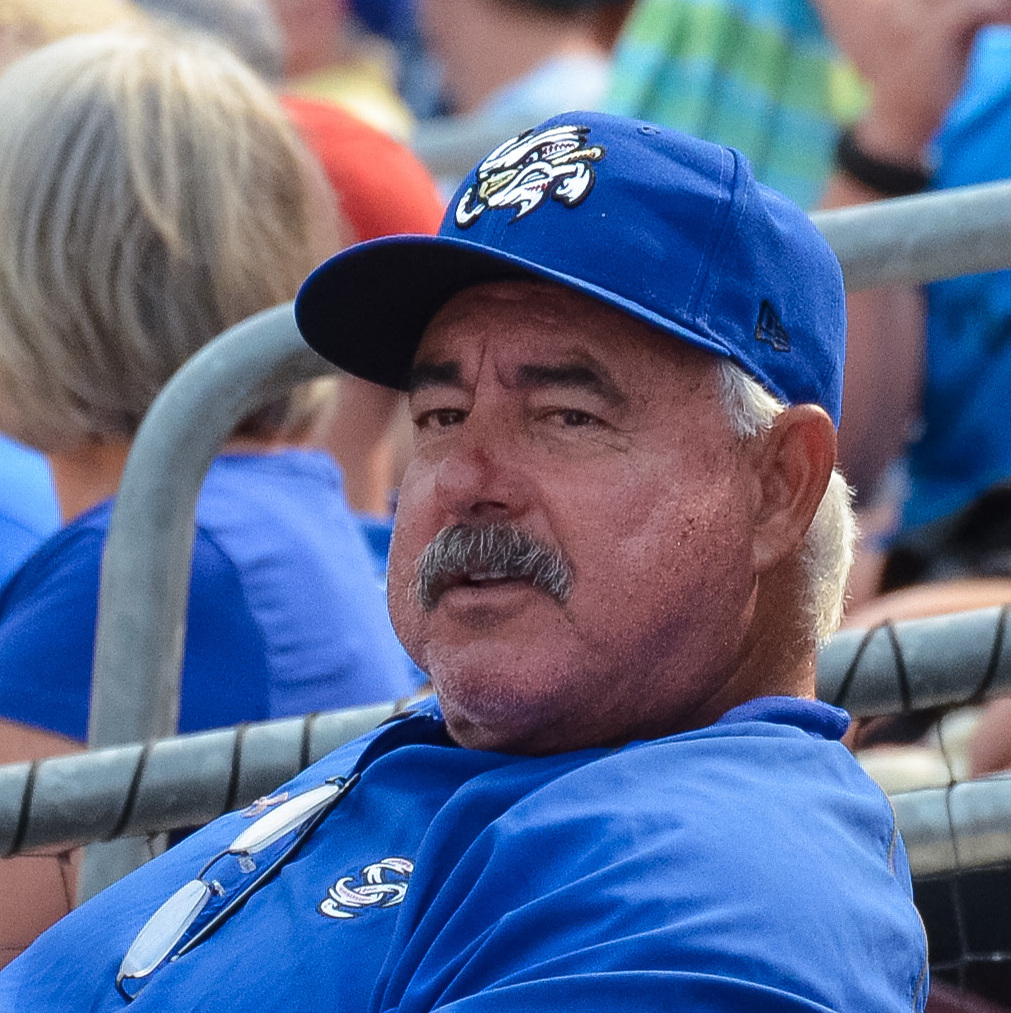
- Nipper as a coach with the Omaha Storm Chasers in 2015
- Pitcher
- Born: April 2, 1959 (age 65); San Diego, California, U.S.
- Batted: Right Threw: Right

MLB debut
- September 6, 1983, for the Boston Red Sox

Last MLB appearance
- July 16, 1990, for the Cleveland Indians

MLB statistics
- Win–loss record: 46–50
- Earned run average: 4.52
- Strikeouts: 381
- Stats at Baseball Reference

Teams
- Boston Red Sox (1983–1987); Chicago Cubs (1988); Cleveland Indians (1990)

Albert Samuel Nipper (born April 2, 1959) is an American former professional baseball player and coach. A right-handed pitcher, he appeared in 144 Major League games over seven seasons for the Boston Red Sox, Chicago Cubs and Cleveland Indians. He was listed as 6 feet (1.8 m) tall and 188 pounds (85 kg).

== Major League Baseball playing career ==
Born in San Diego, Nipper grew up in Missouri, where he graduated from Hazelwood West High School and Truman State University in Kirkville (formerly Northeast Missouri State University). He was the Red Sox' eighth selection in the 1980 Major League Baseball draft.

Nipper pitched for the Red Sox from 1983 to 1987. He was included with the league's top players in the ballot for Rookie of the Year in 1984. But then a succession of injuries limited his success. He started 26 games for the 1986 Red Sox, posting a mediocre 10–12 win–loss record and 5.38 earned run average as Boston won the American League East Division title. He did not appear in the ALCS against the California Angels, but made two appearances on the mound for the Red Sox in the 1986 World Series against the New York Mets. Nipper started Game 4 on October 22 at Fenway Park and held the Mets scoreless through three innings, but in the fourth, he surrendered three runs, two on a home run by Gary Carter. Nipper righted himself after that inning and pitched through the sixth, but the three runs he allowed held up as the winning margin in a 6–2 New York victory. Then, in the winner-take-all Game 7 at Shea Stadium October 27, Nipper was called upon in relief as Boston's fifth pitcher of the contest. Entering in the eighth inning with the Mets leading 6–5, Nipper was ineffective. He retired only one batter and allowed three hits, including a lead-off home run to Darryl Strawberry and a run-scoring single to opposing pitcher Jesse Orosco, enabling the Mets to pad their lead to an insurmountable 8–5; they won the world championship one inning later.

Nipper was traded to the Cubs in a deal for closer Lee Smith after the 1987 season. He pitched in 22 games, 12 as a starter, for the Cubs in 1988, then missed the entire 1989 season recovering from elbow and knee injuries. On June 27, 1988, Nipper recorded the only save of his MLB career, retiring the final out of the game to preserve a 2-1 Cubs victory over the Phillies.

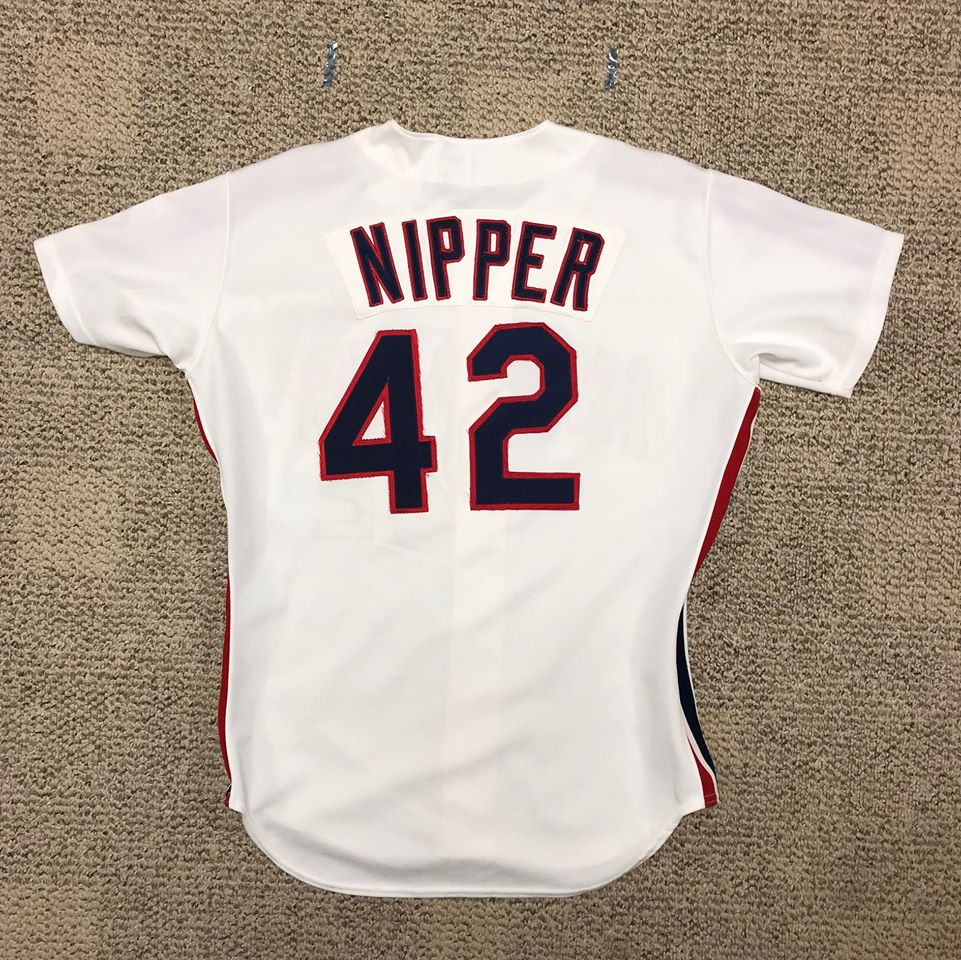
1990 Cleveland Indians #42 Al Nipper game worn home jersey

He signed as a free agent with Cleveland in 1990; in a season spent mostly with the Triple-A Colorado Springs Sky Sox, Nipper won his final two MLB games in mid-season.

He then signed a minor league contract with his hometown St. Louis Cardinals in 1991, but was not called up from Triple-A. It was his final season as a pitcher.

In his 144 total major league regular-season games played (124 as a starting pitcher), he finished with a career record of 46–50 and a 4.52 earned run average in 7972/3 innings pitched, with 381 strikeouts and 21 complete games. He allowed 846 hits and 303 bases on balls. In his only postseason action, in the 1986 World Series, Nipper posted an 0–1 (7.11) record, allowing five runs, ten hits and two bases on balls in two games and 61/3 innings of work.

== Coaching career ==
After his pitching career, Nipper became a major and minor league pitching coach and scout. He returned to the Red Sox in 1992 and served in a succession of coaching roles at the minor league level (1992 through mid-1995, and 1997) and as pitching coach on the big league staff under Kevin Kennedy from mid-1995 through mid-1996. He became the roving minor league pitching instructor for the Texas Rangers, serving for three years (1998–2000), then joined the Kansas City Royals as MLB pitching coach in 2001 and 2002. Returning to the Red Sox as pitching coach of Class A Sarasota (2003–04) and then minor league pitching coordinator (2005), he was promoted to MLB bullpen coach in 2006, although he spent much of that season as the Red Sox' interim pitching coach because of the surgery-induced absence of Dave Wallace. Then, from 2007 to 2011, he was a special assignment scout for the Red Sox, specializing in evaluating pitchers.

In 2012–13, Nipper was the minor league pitching coordinator of the Detroit Tigers and he spent 2014 as pitching coach of the Triple-A Toledo Mud Hens in the Tigers' system. In 2015, he returned to the Royals' organization as the pitching coach of the Omaha Storm Chasers, their Triple-A affiliate.

Sporting positions
Preceded by John Cumberland	Boston Red Sox pitching coach 1995–1996	Succeeded by Sammy Ellis
Preceded by Brent Strom	Kansas City Royals pitching coach 2001–2002	Succeeded by John Cumberland
Preceded by Bill Haselman	Boston Red Sox bullpen coach 2006	Succeeded by Gary Tuck
