= Billy Gardner =

American baseball player and manager (1927–2024)

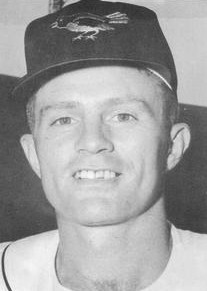
- Second baseman
- Born: July 19, 1927; New London, Connecticut, U.S.
- Died: January 3, 2024 (aged 96); Waterford, Connecticut, U.S.
- Batted: Right Threw: Right

MLB debut
- April 22, 1954, for the New York Giants

Last MLB appearance
- September 11, 1963, for the Boston Red Sox

MLB statistics
- Batting average: .237
- Home runs: 41
- Runs batted in: 271
- Managerial record: 330–417
- Winning %: .442
- Stats at Baseball Reference
- Managerial record at Baseball Reference

Teams
- As player: New York Giants (1954–1955); Baltimore Orioles (1956–1959); Washington Senators / Minnesota Twins (1960–1961); New York Yankees (1961–1962); Boston Red Sox (1962–1963); As manager: Minnesota Twins (1981–1985); Kansas City Royals (1987); As coach: Boston Red Sox (1965–1966); Montreal Expos (1977–1978); Minnesota Twins (1981)

Career highlights and awards
- 2× World Series champion (1954, 1961)

William Frederick Gardner (July 19, 1927 – January 3, 2024) was an American professional baseball player, coach, and manager. During his ten-season active career in Major League Baseball (MLB), Gardner was a second baseman for the New York Giants, Baltimore Orioles, Washington Senators/Minnesota Twins, New York Yankees, and Boston Red Sox. His only significant time on any team was with Baltimore, where he spent four consecutive full seasons from 1956 to 1959. He threw and batted right-handed, stood 6 feet (1.83 m) tall and weighed 170 pounds (77 kg). After retiring as a player, he spent over 20 years as a coach or manager, and managed the Minnesota Twins and Kansas City Royals during the 1980s.

== MLB playing career ==
Born in New London, Connecticut, Gardner was signed by the Giants in 1945 and came up with them on April 22, 1954, but he could not break into the contending team's lineup. In early 1956, he was purchased by the Orioles. Gardner picked up a career-high of 10 steals, but in his best season of 1957, he led the league in doubles with 36, and at bats with 644. He played in every one of the 154 games that season, batting .262 with 6 home runs and 55 RBIs. In his career, Gardner also came in the top 10 in hit by pitches twice (1956 and 1957), with a career-high of 8 in 1957 (fifth in the league).

Gardner wound up as a utility infielder with 1961 Yankees, winning the 1961 World Series with them against the Cincinnati Reds. In his one and only at bat of the post-season, he lined out to shortstop in the ninth inning of Game 2. The Yankees lost the game 6–2. Gardner ended his career with two years on the Red Sox, picking up 70 hits with them in 283 at bats. Nicknamed "Shotgun" for his rifle arm, Gardner led American League second basemen in fielding percentage in 1957 (.987), including 55 consecutive errorless games, and finished with a .976 fielding mark all-time. In all or parts of ten seasons, Gardner batted .237 with 41 home runs and 271 RBIs in 1,034 games played. He picked up 841 hits, with 159 doubles and 18 triples in 3,544 career at bats. He finished with 19 career steals.

== As a manager and coach ==
After finishing his career with the Red Sox, Gardner stayed in the Boston organization for eight more seasons as a minor league coach and manager (1964; 1967–71) and major league third-base coach (1965–66). He then managed in the Kansas City Royals farm system from 1972 to 1976, coached at first base for the Montreal Expos in 1977–78, and was a skipper in the Montreal farm system in 1979–80.

Gardner rejoined the Twins as a third-base coach for the 1981 season. He was promoted to manager on May 23, 1981, replacing Johnny Goryl, and served until June 21, 1985, never leading Minnesota to the playoffs and avoiding a losing record only once (1984, at 81–81). Gardner incorporated young players such as Kent Hrbek, Kirby Puckett, Frank Viola and Tim Laudner into the Twin lineup, beginning the foundation of the club's two World Series clubs to come. After a 268–353 record with Minnesota, Gardner received a second chance to manage with the 1987 Royals. Gardner initially signed as the Royals' 1987 third-base coach, but terminally ill Royals manager Dick Howser, diagnosed with a malignant brain tumor during the summer of 1986, was forced to retire during spring training, and Gardner was promoted to fill the vacancy. He was fired on August 28 of that year after going 62–64, and John Wathan took over. His career record as a manager was 330–417, a .442 winning percentage.

== Personal life ==
Gardner's son, Billy Jr., a former minor league infielder, is a manager in the Miami Marlins' farm system, currently with the Beloit Sky Carp. Gardner Jr. was the Washington Nationals' minor league coordinator in 2018 and 2019 and the manager for the Harrisburg Senators before their 2020 season was cancelled; previously, from 2014 to 2017, he was the skipper of the Syracuse Chiefs of the International League, the Nationals' Triple-A affiliate.

Gardner died at his home in Waterford, Connecticut, on January 3, 2024, at the age of 96.

== See also ==
- List of Major League Baseball annual doubles leaders

Sporting positions
Preceded by Billy Herman	Boston Red Sox third-base coach 1965–1966	Succeeded by Eddie Popowski
Preceded by Eddie Popowski	Pittsfield Red Sox manager 1967–1969	Succeeded by Franchise relocated
Preceded by Eddie Kasko	Louisville Colonels manager 1970	Succeeded by Darrell Johnson
Preceded by Matt Sczesny	Pawtucket Red Sox (Eastern League) manager 1971	Succeeded by Don Lock
Preceded by Ray Hathaway	Jacksonville Suns manager 1972–1974	Succeeded by Bill Scripture
Preceded by Harry Malmberg	Omaha Royals manager 1975–1976	Succeeded by John Sullivan
Preceded by Bill Adair	Montreal Expos first-base coach 1977–1978	Succeeded by Felipe Alou
Preceded by Felipe Alou	Memphis Chicks manager 1979	Succeeded by Larry Bearnarth
Preceded by Jack McKeon	Denver Bears manager 1980	Succeeded by Felipe Alou
Preceded by Karl Kuehl	Minnesota Twins third-base coach 1981	Succeeded by Karl Kuehl
