= John Cumberland =

American baseball player (1947–2022)

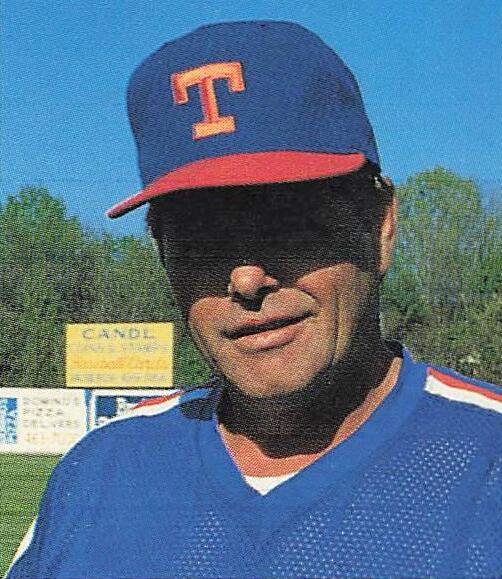
- Cumberland as a coach for the Tidewater Tides c. 1988
- Pitcher
- Born: May 10, 1947; Westbrook, Maine, U.S.
- Died: April 5, 2022 (aged 74); Lutz, Florida, U.S.
- Batted: Right Threw: Left

MLB debut
- September 27, 1968, for the New York Yankees

Last MLB appearance
- July 27, 1974, for the California Angels

MLB statistics
- Win–loss record: 15–16
- Earned run average: 3.82
- Strikeouts: 137
- Stats at Baseball Reference

Teams
- New York Yankees (1968–1970); San Francisco Giants (1970–1972); St. Louis Cardinals (1972); California Angels (1974)

John Sheldon Cumberland (May 10, 1947 – April 5, 2022) was an American professional baseball pitcher and coach. A left-hander, Cumberland appeared in 110 games over all or parts of six Major League Baseball seasons between 1968 and 1974 as a member of the New York Yankees, San Francisco Giants, St. Louis Cardinals and California Angels. He batted right-handed and was listed as 6 feet (1.8 m) tall and 185 pounds (84 kg).

== Pitching career ==
Born in Westbrook, Maine, Cumberland played one season of college baseball at the University of Maine in Orono. He signed with the Philadelphia Phillies as an undrafted free agent before the 1966 minor-league season, which he spent with the Eugene Emeralds of the Class A Short Season Northwest League, prior to his selection by the Yankees in the November draft.

The Yankees advanced Cumberland all the way to Triple-A for his next three pro campaigns. He posted a 26–20 won–lost record in 76 games between 1967 and 1969 for the Syracuse Chiefs of the International League. He also made his MLB debut as a Yankee, appearing in three games during the 1968 and 1969 campaigns. The 1970 season began with him on the New York roster. He appeared in 15 games through July 19, eight as a starter, before being traded on July 20 to the Giants for fellow southpaw Mike McCormick.

Although Cumberland would be sent to Triple-A Phoenix for the month of August, the transaction led to his finest season-plus in the majors. When he was recalled to San Francisco in September 1970, he reeled off five stellar appearances as a relief pitcher, winning his only two decisions and allowing no earned runs in 92/3 innings pitched. Then, in 1971, Cumberland set personal bests in most major pitching categories. Appearing in 45 games, 21 as a starter, and 185 innings, he compiled a 9–6 record, with five complete games, two shutouts, two saves, and 65 strikeouts, with a 2.92 earned run average, as the Giants won the 1971 National League West Division championship. Taking a turn between Baseball Hall of Fame hurlers Gaylord Perry, who started the opening game, and Juan Marichal, who would start Game 3, Cumberland started the second game of the NLCS against the Pittsburgh Pirates, but was relieved in the fourth inning with none out, a runner on base, and the Giants trailing 3–2. They were not able to overcome the early deficit, and when the game ended 9–4 Pittsburgh, Cumberland was charged with the loss.

He began 1972 in the Giants' starting rotation but was ineffective, compiling a 9.68 earned run average through June 7. On June 16, he was dealt to the Cardinals, where he worked in 14 games but continued to struggle, putting up a 6.65 ERA as a member of the St. Louis bullpen. On November 29, he was traded along with Larry Hisle to the Minnesota Twins for Wayne Granger. But the Twins released Cumberland on April 10, 1973, and he spent the early part of season back in the Giants' organization at Triple-A Phoenix. When San Francisco released him on June 30, he signed the following day with the Angels' Triple-A affiliate in Salt Lake City. He was able to return to the majors in 1974 with the Halos on May 29, and over the next two months, he worked in 17 games—all in relief—and posted a 3.74 ERA in 212/3 innings pitched. His nine-year professional pitching career ended that season.

All told, Cumberland appeared in 110 MLB games, 36 as a starting pitcher. He compiled a 15–16 won–lost mark with six complete games, two shutouts and two saves. In 3341/3 innings pitched, he permitted 312 hits (including 46 home runs) and 103 bases on balls and 142 earned runs, with 137 strikeouts. He career ERA was 3.82. In the postseason (the 1971 NLCS), he was 0–1 (9.00) in three full innings pitched, allowing seven hits and no bases on balls, with four strikeouts.

== Coaching career ==
Cumberland began a 23-year professional baseball coaching career in the New York Mets' farm system in 1982 as pitching coach of Class A Lynchburg of the Carolina League. After three seasons, including 1983 when 18-year-old phenom Doc Gooden dominated the Carolina loop with a 19–4 (2.50) performance, Cumberland was promoted to Triple-A Tidewater, spending another three years there before he was named the Mets' 1989 minor league pitching coordinator. Cumberland left the Mets after the 1990 season, and worked as minor league pitching coordinator or Triple-A pitching coach for the Milwaukee Brewers and San Diego Padres.

He then joined the Boston Red Sox organization in 1995, serving as Boston's MLB pitching coach for the first three months of the 1995 season on the staff of Kevin Kennedy before becoming a Red Sox scout. He was pitching coach of Triple-A Pawtucket from 1996 to 1998, then rejoined the Red Sox' MLB staff as bullpen coach under Jimy Williams from 1999 to August 15, 2001. He then briefly succeeded Joe Kerrigan (Williams' replacement) as pitching coach, before he was dropped from Kerrigan's staff on September 3 and left the organization. From June 18, 2002, through June 29, 2004, he was the pitching coach of the Kansas City Royals under manager Tony Peña.

Cumberland left baseball after departing Peña's staff in mid-2004. He died in Lutz, Florida, at 74, on April 5, 2022, survived by his wife of 52 years, three sons, a brother, a sister, and three grandchildren. A former member of the United States Army Reserve, he also was a member of the Maine Sports Hall of Fame.

Preceded by Mike Roarke; Joe Kerrigan	Boston Red Sox pitching coach 1995; 2001	Succeeded by Al Nipper; Ralph Treuel
Preceded by Dick Pole	Boston Red Sox bullpen coach 1999–2001	Succeeded by Bob Kipper
Preceded by Al Nipper	Kansas City Royals pitching coach 2002–2004	Succeeded by Mike Mason
