= Eddie Popowski =

American baseball coach and manager

- Coach/Interim manager
- Born: August 20, 1913; Sayreville, New Jersey, U.S.
- Died: December 4, 2001 (aged 88); Sayreville, New Jersey, U.S.
- Batted: Right Threw: Right
- Stats at Baseball Reference
- Managerial record at Baseball Reference

Teams
- As coach: Boston Red Sox (1967–1975, 1976); As manager: Boston Red Sox (1969, 1973)

Edward Joseph Popowski (August 20, 1913 – December 4, 2001), nicknamed "Pop", was an American coach and interim manager for the Boston Red Sox of Major League Baseball. Popowski spent 65 years in organized baseball—all of them in the Boston organization. He was a native and lifelong resident of Sayreville, New Jersey.

== 21 years as minor league manager ==
Only 5 feet 4 inches (1.63 m) tall, Popowski, a second baseman, began playing in the Red Sox farm system in 1937 after touring with the barnstorming, semi-professional baseball club "the House of David" as the only non-bearded player on the squad. He never played in the big leagues, but began a 21-year minor league managerial career in 1941 with the Centreville Red Sox in the Class D Eastern Shore League. With time out for U.S. Army service during World War II, he would manage and coach with Red Sox farm teams through 1966. He spent many years managing at the Class A and Double-A levels, working patiently with Boston prospects. In his only Triple-A managerial role, in 1960, he was the last skipper in the history of the Minneapolis Millers of the American Association. Led by future Baseball Hall of Famer Carl Yastrzemski, who batted .339, the Millers posted an 82–72 record but finished out of the playoffs. They were succeeded by the major league Minnesota Twins in 1961.

Not counting his Centreville tenure, Popowski compiled a record of 1,568 wins and 1,357 losses (.536), with four pennants, during his career as a minor league manager. He also served as a coach for the Triple-A Louisville Colonels in 1951–52.

== MLB coach ==
In 1967, Popowski was promoted to the parent Red Sox as third-base coach under Dick Williams. That season, the Red Sox, who had finished ninth in the ten-team American League in 1966, stunned the baseball world by winning their first pennant since 1946. Popowski was Boston's third-base coach for seven seasons, through 1973. As a third-base coach, he was notable for flipping the ball behind his back to the pitcher when one came to rest inside his coach's box. He had learned the trick with the House of David.

Popowski twice served out a season as acting manager, relieving Williams in 1969, and Eddie Kasko in 1973, the latter for only one game. Popowski won six of the ten major league contests that he managed.

Popowski remained on Boston's MLB staff under new manager Darrell Johnson as first-base coach in 1974, and was a special assignment coach in 1975, when the Red Sox once again won the American League pennant. He was a bench coach for the Red Sox during the 1975 World Series.

In 1976, Popowski began the year as a minor league instructor but he returned to the Boston coaching staff to fill the vacancy created July 19 when Don Zimmer was promoted to manager after Johnson's firing. Popowski coached at third base for part of the season, and in the dugout.

=== Managerial record ===
Team	Year	Regular season					Postseason			
Team	Year	Games	Won	Lost	Win %	Finish	Won	Lost	Win %	Result
BOS	1969	9	5	4	.556	3rd in AL East	–	–	–	–
BOS	1973	1	1	0	1.000	2nd in AL East	–	–	–	–
Total		10	6	4	.600		0	0	–	

== Active in baseball for 65 years ==
In 1977, he returned to Boston's farm system for good as a roving infield instructor and coordinator of Boston's extended spring training program. Although his responsibilities were gradually reduced as he grew older, he remained active in the Red Sox system through 2001, and his 88th birthday. A field in Boston's training base at Fort Myers, Florida, was named in his honor.

Sporting positions
Preceded by Gene Mauch	Minneapolis Millers manager 1960	Succeeded by Franchise disbanded
Preceded by Franchise established	Reading Red Sox manager 1963–1964	Succeeded by Franchise relocated
Preceded by Franchise established	Pittsfield Red Sox manager 1965–1966	Succeeded by Billy Gardner
Preceded by Billy Gardner; Don Zimmer	Boston Red Sox third-base coach 1967–1973; 1976	Succeeded by Don Zimmer; Eddie Yost
Preceded by Don Lenhardt	Boston Red Sox first-base coach 1974	Succeeded by Johnny Pesky
