= Dave Wallace (baseball) =

American baseball player, coach, and executive (born 1947)

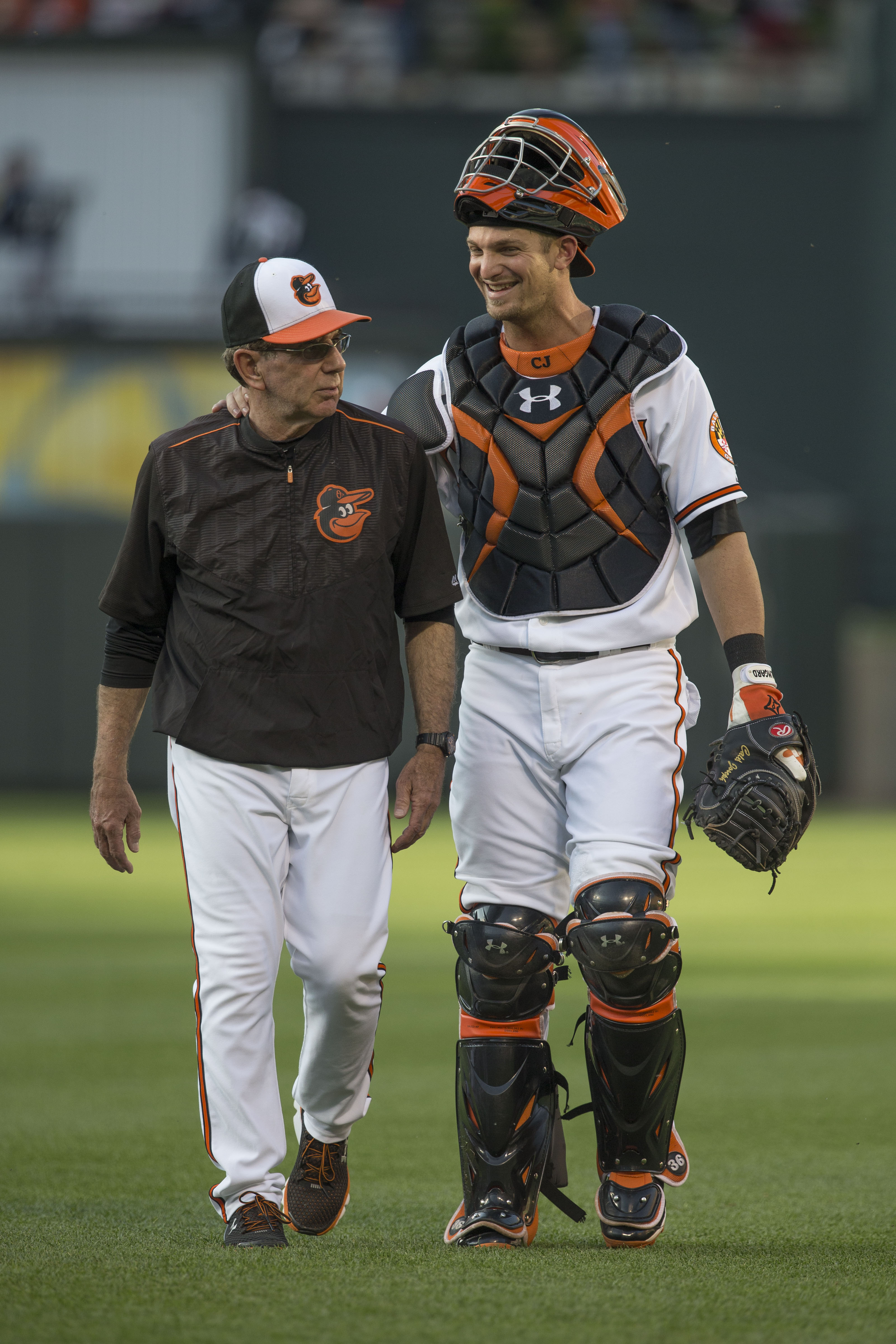
- Wallace (left) with Caleb Joseph in 2015
- Pitcher
- Born: September 7, 1947 (age 78); Waterbury, Connecticut, U.S.
- Batted: Right Threw: Right

MLB debut
- July 18, 1973, for the Philadelphia Phillies

Last MLB appearance
- May 19, 1978, for the Toronto Blue Jays

MLB statistics
- Win–loss record: 0–1
- Earned run average: 7.84
- Strikeouts: 12
- Stats at Baseball Reference

Teams
- As player: Philadelphia Phillies (1973–1974); Toronto Blue Jays (1978); As coach: Los Angeles Dodgers (1995–1997); New York Mets (1999–2000); Boston Red Sox (2003–2006); Houston Astros (2007); Baltimore Orioles (2014–2016)
Medals
Men's baseball
Representing the United States
Summer Olympics
Silver medal – second place	2020 Tokyo	Team

David William Wallace (born September 7, 1947) is an American former professional baseball pitcher, pitching coach and front-office executive. He played in Major League Baseball (MLB) for the Philadelphia Phillies and Toronto Blue Jays. After his playing career he was a pitching coach for the Los Angeles Dodgers, New York Mets, Boston Red Sox, Houston Astros and Baltimore Orioles.

== Playing career ==
An all-around athlete at Sacred Heart High School of Waterbury, Connecticut, Wallace played baseball, basketball and football. Wallace had a Hall of Fame collegiate career at the University of New Haven, where he went 24–7 with a 2.18 earned run average and 311 strikeouts in his four-year career. He signed with the Philadelphia Phillies as an amateur free agent in 1970. A right-handed relief pitcher, Wallace posted a 47–31 record with 60 saves in 355 career minor league outings. In the Majors, he made 13 appearances for the Phillies (1973–74) and Toronto Blue Jays (1978) and went 0–1 with 12 strikeouts and a 7.84 ERA in 20 2/3 innings. He concluded his playing career with Triple-A Pawtucket (1979).

== Coaching career ==
After his retirement as a player, Wallace became a pitching coach in the Dodgers' organization for Class A Vero Beach (1981–82), Double-A San Antonio (1983) and Triple-A Albuquerque (1984–86). He also managed San Antonio for part of the 1983 season and put himself into four games as a pitcher in both 1984 and 1986 with the Dukes. He was then the Dodgers' minor league pitching coordinator from 1987 to 1994 until he replaced Ron Perranoski as the Dodgers' Major League pitching coach in 1995.

As a coach, Wallace is credited with helping develop the talents of pitchers Pedro Martínez, Ramón Martínez, Pedro Astacio, Darren Dreifort, Hideo Nomo, Chan Ho Park, Ismael Valdéz and John Wetteland. He was also credited by Orel Hershiser for his early success with the Dodgers in a Sports Illustrated article.

Wallace left the Dodgers after the 1998 season and became the pitching coach of the New York Mets from 1999 to 2000, under Bobby Valentine, including New York's 2000 National League championship club. But he and Valentine did not have a close working relationship, and Wallace resigned after the 2000 World Series to rejoin the Dodgers as senior vice president, baseball operations. He then served as an interim general manager of the Dodgers in 2001 after Kevin Malone was forced to resign at midseason.

Wallace left the Dodger front office to become the pitching coach for the Boston Red Sox on June 10, 2003, replacing Tony Cloninger, who at the time was (successfully) battling bladder cancer. Wallace then won a World Series ring with the Red Sox in 2004.

In February 2006, while driving to spring training, Wallace was hospitalized in Spartanburg, South Carolina, with intense pain in his right hip. Twelve years after having hip replacement surgery, Wallace discovered he was suffering from a severe infection in the replaced joint. He nearly died from the infection, and underwent immediate surgery. He had a second replacement surgery in June and was able to resume his duties with the Red Sox on August 8, 2006, through the end of the season, when he resigned.

Wallace was hired as the new pitching coach by the Houston Astros in 2007, but left that job in October 2007 when he was hired by the Seattle Mariners organization as a special assistant to the general manager. On January 13, 2009, he was named the Mariners minor league pitching coordinator. After completing the 2009 season in this position, Wallace was hired by the Atlanta Braves to serve in the same capacity for them. He briefly filled in as the Braves pitching coach in 2011 while Roger McDowell was on suspension.

In November 2013, he was named as the Baltimore Orioles pitching coach replacing interim coach Bill Castro. Wallace's retirement from the Orioles was announced at a press conference on October 6, 2016, however, Wallace immediately rejoined the Braves as a pitching consultant.

In April 2021, Wallace was named as a coach for the United States national baseball team, for the team's final efforts to qualify for baseball at the 2020 Summer Olympics in Tokyo in 2021. The team qualified, with Wallace serving as the team's pitching coach for the Olympics. The team went on to win silver, falling to Japan in the gold-medal game.

Sporting positions
Preceded by Ron Perranoski	Los Angeles Dodgers pitching coach 1995–1997	Succeeded by Glenn Gregson
Preceded by Bob Apodaca	New York Mets pitching coach 1999–2000	Succeeded by Charlie Hough
Preceded by Kevin Malone	Los Angeles Dodgers general manager 2001	Succeeded by Dan Evans
Preceded by Tony Cloninger	Boston Red Sox pitching coach 2003–2006	Succeeded by John Farrell
Preceded by Jim Hickey	Houston Astros pitching coach 2007	Succeeded by Dewey Robinson
Preceded by Roger McDowell	Atlanta Braves pitching coach (interim); April 29, 2011 – May 14, 2011	Succeeded by Roger McDowell
Preceded by Bill Castro (interim)	Baltimore Orioles pitching coach 2014–2016	Succeeded by Roger McDowell
