= Rac Slider =

American baseball player (born 1933)

- Coach
- Born: December 23, 1933 (age 92); Simms, Texas, U.S.
- Bats: Left Throws: Right

Teams
- Boston Red Sox (1987–1990)

Rachel Wayne "Rac" Slider (born December 23, 1933) is an American former infielder and manager in American minor league baseball who also spent four seasons (1987–1990) as a Major League Baseball coach with the Boston Red Sox. In his playing days, Slider stood 5 feet 8 inches (1.73 m) tall, weighed 160 pounds (73 kg), batted left-handed and threw right-handed.

Slider graduated from James Bowie High School in Simms in 1951, and signed his first professional baseball contract in 1954. During an 11-year playing career (1954–1956; 1958–1964; 1966) he never reached the Major League level, although he spent four seasons in the Triple-A Pacific Coast League. In his finest year in the PCL, with the 1961 Hawaii Islanders, Slider batted .300 with 154 hits, 75 runs scored, and a career-high seven home runs. In 1962, the Kansas City Athletics sold Slider's contract to the Red Sox, and he spent the remainder of his career in the Boston organization.

He managed Bosox farm clubs for 21 consecutive seasons, from 1965 through 1985, beginning with the Harlan Red Sox and Covington Red Sox in the Rookie-level Appalachian League. His next assignment, in 1967–1968 as skipper of the Class A Waterloo Hawks, saw the professional debut of eventual Hall of Fame catcher Carlton Fisk. Slider spent nine seasons at the helm of the Red Sox' Winter Haven affiliate in the Class A Florida State League. He won pennants in 1970 (in the Class A Western Carolinas League) and 1979 (in the Florida State League). In 1983, his New Britain Red Sox won the Double-A Eastern League playoffs behind first-year pitcher Roger Clemens.

In all, Slider spent three seasons in Double-A and reached the highest minor league level as the pilot of the 1985 Pawtucket Red Sox of the Triple-A International League. Overall, his managerial record was 1,275–1,405 (.476) in 2,680 games.

Slider was promoted to the MLB Red Sox' coaching staff after the 1986 season. He served under John McNamara as Boston's bullpen coach, and under Joe Morgan as the Red Sox' third-base coach, from 1987 to 1990. He was a minor league infield instructor with the Red Sox in 1986 and from 1991 to 1994.

Preceded by Franchise established	Bristol Red Sox manager 1973	Succeeded by Stan Williams
Preceded by Franchise established	New Britain Red Sox manager 1983–1984	Succeeded by Ed Nottle
Preceded by Tony Torchia	Pawtucket Red Sox manager 1985	Succeeded by Ed Nottle
Preceded by Joe Morgan	Boston Red Sox bullpen coach 1987–1988	Succeeded by Jerry McNertney
Preceded by Joe Morgan	Boston Red Sox third-base coach 1988–1990	Succeeded by Dick Berardino
