= John Kennedy (third baseman) =

American baseball player (1941–2018)

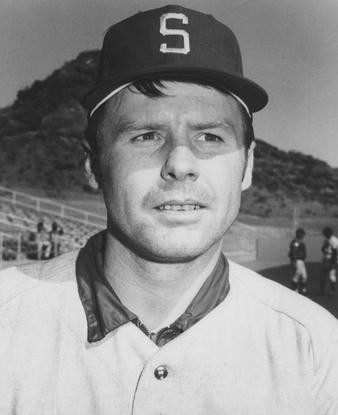
- Kennedy in 1969
- Infielder
- Born: May 29, 1941; Chicago, Illinois, U.S.
- Died: August 9, 2018 (aged 77); Peabody, Massachusetts, U.S.
- Batted: Right Threw: Right

MLB debut
- September 5, 1962, for the Washington Senators

Last MLB appearance
- June 16, 1974, for the Boston Red Sox

MLB statistics
- Batting average: .225
- Home runs: 32
- Runs batted in: 185
- Stats at Baseball Reference

Teams
- Washington Senators (1962–1964); Los Angeles Dodgers (1965–1966); New York Yankees (1967); Seattle Pilots / Milwaukee Brewers (1969–1970); Boston Red Sox (1970–1974)

Career highlights and awards
- World Series champion (1965)

John Edward Kennedy (May 29, 1941 – August 9, 2018) was an American Major League Baseball third baseman, shortstop and second baseman. He played from 1962 to 1974 for the Washington Senators, Los Angeles Dodgers, New York Yankees, Seattle Pilots / Milwaukee Brewers, and Boston Red Sox. He was born in Chicago, Illinois and attended Harper High School.

== Major League career ==
Kennedy spent twelve seasons in the major leagues. He hit a home run in his first major league at bat (on September 5, 1962, against Dick Stigman of the Minnesota Twins), and garnered headlines because both his name and birthdate, May 29, were shared with the President of the United States at the time, John F. Kennedy, born 24 years earlier.

His only season as a full-time regular was with the 1964 Washington Senators under manager Gil Hodges, primarily as a third baseman, but also playing at shortstop and second base. Kennedy hit .230 with seven home runs and 35 runs batted in (RBI) in 148 games. After the 1964 season, he was traded with pitcher Claude Osteen and cash to the Los Angeles Dodgers for five players, including outfielder Frank Howard. With the Dodgers, Kennedy would be part of history when he replaced Jim Gilliam at third base in the eighth inning of Sandy Koufax's perfect game on September 9, 1965. Kennedy did not get to bat in that game, nor did he have a fielding chance as Koufax struck out the last six Chicago Cubs he faced to complete his then-record fourth no-hitter. The New York Yankees acquired Kennedy in a trade after the 1966 season, then sold him to the expansion Seattle Pilots after the 1968 season. Kennedy retired in 1974 after four and a half seasons with the Boston Red Sox.

== Retirement ==
Kennedy scouted, managed, and coached in the minor leagues after leaving Major League Baseball. He managed the North Shore Spirit through most of their five years as an independent team, and was named the Can-Am League Manager of the Year in 2006.
