= 2016 International League season =

2016 International League Season
- League: International League
- Sport: Baseball
- Duration: April 7 – September 5, 2016
- Games: 143
- Teams: 14

Regular season
- Season champions: North–Scranton/Wilkes-Barre; South–Gwinnett; West–Columbus
- Season MVP: Batter–Ben Gamel (Scranton/Wilkes-Barre); Pitcher–Jake Thompson (Lehigh Valley)

Governors' Cup
- Champions: Scranton/Wilkes-Barre (2nd)
- Runners-up: Gwinnett

IL seasons
- ← 2015 2017 →

The 2016 International League season began on April 7 and ended on September 5, 2016. Following the regular season, the Governors' Cup playoffs were played from September 7–17, 2016.

The 2016 Triple-A All-Star Game was held on Wednesday, July 13 at BB&T Ballpark in Charlotte, North Carolina, home of the Charlotte Knights. The International League All-Stars defeated the Pacific Coast League All-Stars, 4–2, for their twelfth win in the series.

The Scranton/Wilkes-Barre RailRiders defeated the Gwinnett Braves, 3 games to 1, to win their second Governors' Cup.

The RailRiders went on to defeat the El Paso Chihuahuas, 3–1, in the 2016 Triple-A Baseball National Championship Game at AutoZone Park in Memphis, Tennessee.

== Teams ==
Division	Team	Founded	MLB Affiliation	City	Stadium	Capacity
North	Buffalo Bisons	1985	Toronto Blue Jays	Buffalo, New York	Coca-Cola Field	17,600
North	Lehigh Valley IronPigs	2008	Philadelphia Phillies	Allentown, Pennsylvania	Coca-Cola Park	10,100
North	Pawtucket Red Sox	1973	Boston Red Sox	Pawtucket, Rhode Island	McCoy Stadium	10,031
North	Rochester Red Wings	1899	Minnesota Twins	Rochester, New York	Frontier Field	13,500
North	Scranton/Wilkes-Barre RailRiders	1989	New York Yankees	Moosic, Pennsylvania	PNC Field	10,000
North	Syracuse Chiefs	1961	Washington Nationals	Syracuse, New York	NBT Bank Stadium	11,071
South	Charlotte Knights	1993	Chicago White Sox	Charlotte, North Carolina	BB&T Ballpark	10,200
South	Durham Bulls	1998	Tampa Bay Rays	Durham, North Carolina	Durham Bulls Athletic Park	10,000
South	Gwinnett Braves	2009	Atlanta Braves	Lawrenceville, Georgia	Coolray Field	10,427
South	Norfolk Tides	1969	Baltimore Orioles	Norfolk, Virginia	Harbor Park	11,856
West	Columbus Clippers	1977	Cleveland Indians	Columbus, Ohio	Huntington Park	10,100
West	Indianapolis Indians	1902	Pittsburgh Pirates	Indianapolis, Indiana	Victory Field	14,230
West	Louisville Bats	1982	Cincinnati Reds	Louisville, Kentucky	Louisville Slugger Field	13,131
West	Toledo Mud Hens	1965	Detroit Tigers	Toledo, Ohio	Fifth Third Field	10,300

== Standings ==
=== North Division ===
North Division
Team (Affiliate)	W	L	Pct.	GB
Scranton/Wilkes-Barre RailRiders (NYY)	92	52	.636	–
Lehigh Valley IronPigs (PHI)	85	58	.594	6.0
Rochester Red Wings (MIN)	81	63	.563	10.5
Pawtucket Red Sox (BOS)	74	68	.521	16.5
Buffalo Bisons (TOR)	66	78	.458	25.5
Syracuse Chiefs (WSH)	61	82	.427	30

=== South Division ===
South Division
Team (Affiliate)	W	L	Pct.	GB
Gwinnett Braves (ATL)	65	78	.455	–
Charlotte Knights (CWS)	65	79	.451	0.5
Durham Bulls (TB)	64	80	.444	1.5
Norfolk Tides (BAL)	62	82	.430	3.5

=== West Division ===
West Division
Team (Affiliate)	W	L	Pct.	GB
Columbus Clippers (CLE)	82	62	.569	–
Louisville Bats (CIN)	71	73	.493	11.0
Indianapolis Indians (PIT)	70	74	.486	12.0
Toledo Mud Hens (DET)	68	76	.472	14.0

== Playoffs ==
=== Bracket ===
Semifinals
N	Scranton/Wilkes-Barre RailRiders	3
N	Lehigh Valley IronPigs	0
S	Gwinnett Braves	3
W	Columbus Clippers	1

Finals
N	Scranton/Wilkes-Barre RailRiders	3
S	Gwinnett Braves	1

=== Semifinals ===
==== Scranton/Wilkes-Barre vs. Lehigh Valley ====
Scranton/Wilkes-Barre won the series, 3–0.

Game	Date	Score	Location	Time	Attendance
1	September 7	Scranton/Wilkes-Barre RailRiders 2, Lehigh Valley IronPigs 0	Coca-Cola Park	2:37	4,043
2	September 8	Scranton/Wilkes-Barre RailRiders 7, Lehigh Valley IronPigs 0	Coca-Cola Park	2:42	4,002
3	September 9	Lehigh Valley IronPigs 3, Scranton/Wilkes-Barre RailRiders 11	PNC Field	3:25 (2:11 delay)	4,045

==== Gwinnett Braves vs. Columbus Clippers ====
Gwinnett won the series, 3–1.

Game	Date	Score	Location	Time	Attendance
1	September 7	Gwinnett Braves 5, Columbus Clippers 4	Huntington Park	3:02	8,696
2	September 8	Gwinnett Braves 4, Columbus Clippers 6	Huntington Park	3:09	8,835
3	September 9	Columbus Clippers 1, Gwinnett Braves 11	Coolray Field	2:26	1,662
4	September 10	Columbus Clippers 4, Gwinnett Braves 5	Coolray Field	3:30	1,277

=== Governors' Cup Finals ===
==== Scranton/Wilkes-Barre RailRiders vs. Gwinnett Braves ====
Scranton/Wilkes-Barre won the series, 3–1.

Game	Date	Score	Location	Time	Attendance
1	September 13	Gwinnett Braves 7, Scranton/Wilkes-Barre RailRiders 4	PNC Field	3:02	2,975
2	September 14	Gwinnett Braves 1, Scranton/Wilkes-Barre RailRiders 2	PNC Field	2:39	1,727
3	September 15	Scranton/Wilkes-Barre RailRiders 3, Gwinnett Braves 0	Coolray Field	2:46	1,435
4	September 16	Scranton/Wilkes-Barre RailRiders 3, Gwinnett Braves 0	Coolray Field	2:48	4,617

== Attendance ==
2016 International League attendance
Team	Division	Total attendance	Average attendance
Indianapolis Indians	West	636,888	8,970
Charlotte Knights	South	628,173	8,974
Lehigh Valley IronPigs	North	611,015	8,729
Columbus Clippers	West	602,171	8,855
Buffalo Bisons	North	562,755	8,039
Durham Bulls	South	547,156	7,599
Toledo Mud Hens	West	532,008	7,824
Louisville Bats	West	506,030	7,127
Rochester Red Wings	North	434,897	6,396
Scranton/Wilkes-Barre RailRiders	North	424,991	6,071
Pawtucket Red Sox	North	407,097	6,076
Norfolk Tides	South	373,042	5,486
Syracuse Chiefs	North	274,427	4,158
Gwinnett Braves	South	225,259	3,218
