= 2015 International League season =

2015 International League Season
- League: International League
- Sport: Baseball
- Duration: April 9 – September 7, 2015
- Games: 143
- Teams: 14

Regular season
- Season champions: North–Scranton/Wilkes-Barre; South–Norfolk; West–Columbus and Indianapolis
- Season MVP: Player–Matt Hague (Buffalo); Pitcher–Erik Johnson (Charlotte)

Governors' Cup
- Champions: Columbus Clippers (10th)
- Runners-up: Indianapolis Indians
- Finals MVP: Michael Choice (Columbus)

IL seasons
- ← 2014 2016 →

The 2015 International League season began on April 9 and culminated on September 7, 2015. Following the regular season, the Governors' Cup playoffs were played from September 9–19, 2015.

The 2015 Triple-A All-Star Game was held on Wednesday, July 15 at Werner Park in Papillion, Nebraska, home of the Omaha Storm Chasers. The International League All-Stars defeated the Pacific Coast League All-Stars, 4–3, for their eleventh win in the series.

The Columbus Clippers defeated the Indianapolis Indians, 3 games to 2, to win their tenth Governors' Cup.

The Cippers, however, were defeated by the PCL champion Fresno Grizzlies, 7–0, in the 2015 Triple-A Baseball National Championship Game at Southwest University Park in El Paso, Texas.

== Teams ==
Division	Team	Founded^{1}	MLB Affiliation	City	Stadium	Capacity^{2}
North	Buffalo Bisons	1985	Toronto Blue Jays	Buffalo, New York	Coca-Cola Field	17,600
North	Lehigh Valley IronPigs	2008	Philadelphia Phillies	Allentown, Pennsylvania	Coca-Cola Park	10,100
North	Pawtucket Red Sox	1973	Boston Red Sox	Pawtucket, Rhode Island	McCoy Stadium	10,031
North	Rochester Red Wings	1899	Minnesota Twins	Rochester, New York	Frontier Field	13,500
North	Scranton/Wilkes-Barre RailRiders	1989	New York Yankees	Moosic, Pennsylvania	PNC Field	10,000
North	Syracuse Chiefs	1961	Washington Nationals	Syracuse, New York	NBT Bank Stadium	11,071
South	Charlotte Knights	1993	Chicago White Sox	Charlotte, North Carolina	BB&T Ballpark^{3}	10,200
South	Durham Bulls	1998	Tampa Bay Rays	Durham, North Carolina	Durham Bulls Athletic Park	10,000
South	Gwinnett Braves	2009	Atlanta Braves	Lawrenceville, Georgia	Coolray Field	10,427
South	Norfolk Tides	1969	Baltimore Orioles	Norfolk, Virginia	Harbor Park	11,856
West	Columbus Clippers	1977	Cleveland Indians	Columbus, Ohio	Huntington Park	10,100
West	Indianapolis Indians	1902	Pittsburgh Pirates	Indianapolis, Indiana	Victory Field	14,230
West	Louisville Bats	1982	Cincinnati Reds	Louisville, Kentucky	Louisville Slugger Field	13,131
West	Toledo Mud Hens	1965	Detroit Tigers	Toledo, Ohio	Fifth Third Field	10,300

== Standings ==
=== North Division ===
North Division
Team (Affiliate)	W	L	Pct.	GB	Home	Away
Scranton/Wilkes-Barre RailRiders (NYY)	81	63	.563	–	39–33	42–30
Rochester Red Wings (MIN)	77	67	.535	4.0	45–27	32–40
Buffalo Bisons (TOR)	68	76	.472	13.0	34–38	34–38
Syracuse Chiefs (WSH)	66	78	.458	15.0	36–36	30–42
Lehigh Valley IronPigs (PHI)	63	81	.438	18.0	31–41	32–40
Pawtucket Red Sox (BOS)	59	85	.410	22.0	34–38	25–47

=== South Division ===
South Division
Team (Affiliate)	W	L	Pct.	GB	Home	Away
Norfolk Tides (BAL)	78	66	.542	–	38–34	40–32
Gwinnett Braves (ATL)	77	67	.535	1.0	42–30	35–37
Charlotte Knights (CWS)	74	70	.514	4.0	42–30	32–40
Durham Bulls (TB)	74	70	.514	4.0	39–33	35–37

=== West Division ===
West Division
Team (Affiliate)	W	L	Pct.	GB	Home	Away
Columbus Clippers (CLE)	83	61	.576	–	45–27	38–34
Indianapolis Indians (PIT)	83	61	.576	–	43–29	40–32
Louisville Bats (CIN)	64	80	.444	19.0	34–38	30–42
Toledo Mud Hens (DET)	61	83	.424	22.0	33–39	28–44

== Playoffs ==
=== Bracket ===
Semifinals
N	Scranton/Wilkes-Barre RailRiders	0
WC	Indianapolis Indians	3
S	Norfolk Tides	2
W	Columbus Clippers	3

Finals
WC	Indianapolis Indians	2
W	Columbus Clippers	3

=== Semifinals ===
==== Scranton/Wilkes-Barre vs. Indianapolis ====
Indianapolis won the series, 3–0.

Game	Date	Score	Location	Time	Attendance
1	September 9	Scranton/Wilkes-Barre RailRiders 3, Indianapolis Indians 7	Victory Field	2:45	2,333
2	September 10	Scranton/Wilkes-Barre RailRiders 1, Indianapolis Indians 6	Victory Field	2:19	3,706
3	September 11	Indianapolis Indians 4, Scranton/Wilkes-Barre RailRiders 2	PNC Field	2:56	4,507

==== Norfolk Tides vs. Columbus Clippers ====
Columbus won the series, 3–2.

Game	Date	Score	Location	Time	Attendance
1	September 9	Columbus Clippers 5, Norfolk Tides 2	Harbor Park	2:35	1,459
2	September 10–11	Columbus Clippers 1, Norfolk Tides 6	Harbor Park	2:46	1,777
3	September 12	Norfolk Tides 2, Columbus Clippers 6	Huntington Park	2:54	3,131
4	September 13	Norfolk Tides 6, Columbus Clippers 5	Huntington Park	3:07	2,468
5	September 14	Norfolk Tides 0, Columbus Clippers 5	Huntington Park	2:22	10,734

=== Governors' Cup Finals ===
==== Columbus vs. Indianapolis ====
Columbus won the series, 3–2.

Game	Date	Score	Location	Time	Attendance
1	September 15	Indianapolis Indians 5, Columbus Clippers 6	Huntington Park	2:58	11,408
2	September 16	Indianapolis Indians 4, Columbus Clippers 5	Huntington Park	3:00	11,894
3	September 17	Columbus Clippers 5, Indianapolis Indians 6	Victory Field	3:04	3,845
4	September 18	Columbus Clippers 4, Indianapolis Indians 5	Victory Field	2:42	3,417
5	September 19	Columbus Clippers 3, Indianapolis Indians 0	Victory Field	2:22	5,808

== Attendance ==
2015 International League attendance
Team (Affiliate)	Division	Total attendance	Average attendance
Charlotte Knights	South	669,398	9,428
Indianapolis Indians	West	662,536	9,331
Columbus Clippers	West	622,096	9.016
Lehigh Valley IronPigs	North	613,815	8,769
Durham Bulls	South	554,788	7,814
Buffalo Bisons	North	551,303	8,228
Toledo Mud Hens	West	531,249	7,699
Louisville Bats	West	531,249	7,537
Pawtucket Red Sox	North	466,600	6,572
Rochester Red Wings	North	440,360	6,291
Scranton/Wilkes-Barre RailRiders	North	402,731	5,753
Norfolk Tides	South	386,402	5,767
Gwinnett Braves	South	270,336	3,808
Syracuse Chiefs	North	262,408	3,803
