= Ben Mondor =

1. American business executive and baseball executive

- Born: Bernard Georges Mondor; March 26, 1925; Saint-Ignace-du-Lac, Maskinongé, Quebec, Canada
- Died: October 3, 2010 (aged 85); Warwick Neck, Rhode Island, U.S.
- Resting place: Rhode Island Veterans Memorial Cemetery (Exeter, Rhode Island)
- Occupation: Business executive in textiles
- Known for: Owner of the Pawtucket Red Sox (1977–2010)
- Awards: Rhode Island Heritage Hall of Fame (1984); Boston Red Sox Hall of Fame (2004); International League Hall of Fame (2008)

Bernard Georges "Ben" Mondor (March 26, 1925 – October 3, 2010) was an American business executive and baseball executive, best known as the owner of the Pawtucket Red Sox from 1977 until his death.

== Biography ==
Mondor was born in March 1925 in Saint-Ignace-du-Lac, (Note: Written as "Lac Ignace" on Mondor's draft registration card of March 1943.) Maskinongé, Quebec, son of Rosario Mondor (1888–1962) and Marie Anne Brault (1892–1963). The village he was born in disappeared under water in 1931 due to the construction of the Taureau Reservoir on the Matawin River and was annexed by the neighbouring village of Saint-Michel-des-Saints.

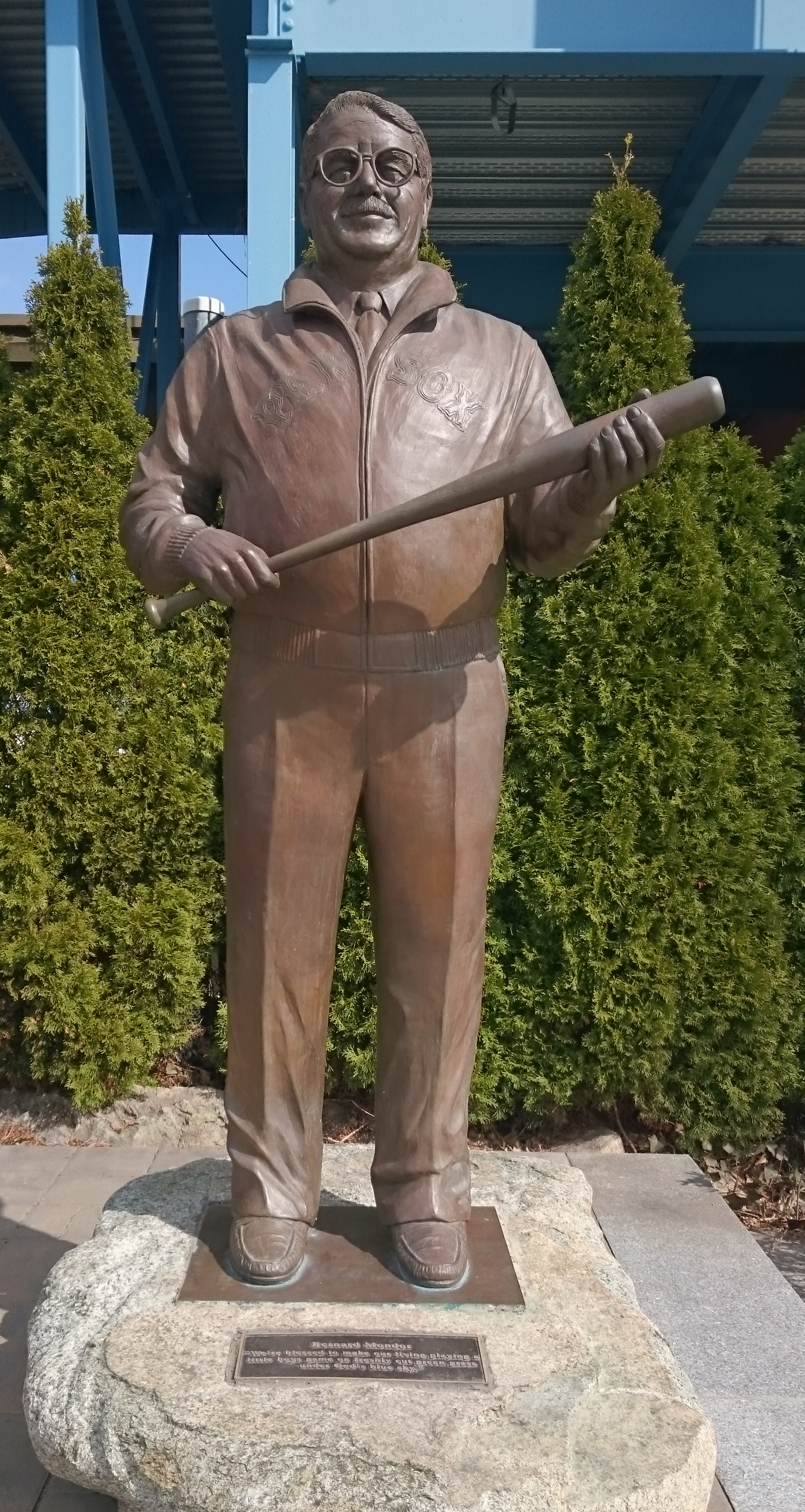
Statue of Mondor outside of McCoy Stadium

Mondor grew up in Woonsocket, Rhode Island, and graduated from Mount St. Charles Academy there. As of March 1943, he was employed by the Verdun Manufacturing Company there. He served in the United States Navy during World War II. Mondor was in private business from the late 1950s through his retirement in 1973; he owned textile mills in several states.

In 1977, Mondor bought the Pawtucket Red Sox, the Triple-A affiliate of the Boston Red Sox, out of bankruptcy. He turned it into one of the model franchises in Minor League Baseball. McCoy Stadium, the team's home ballpark, was renovated and became "one of the most fan-friendly minor league venues in the country". Attendance increased from 70,000 in 1977 to over 600,000 annually during the 2000s. He was a two-time winner of the International League's executive of the year award (1978, 1999).

In 1982, Mondor was awarded an honorary doctorate of public service degree from Rhode Island College, and was inducted to the Rhode Island Heritage Hall of Fame in 1984. He was inducted into the Boston Red Sox Hall of Fame in 2004, and given an honorary day at Fenway Park on May 30 of that year. Mondor was elected to the International League Hall of Fame in 2008.

Mondor died in October 2010 at his home in Warwick Neck, Rhode Island. He was survived by his wife, Madeleine. He is interred at Rhode Island Veterans Memorial Cemetery in Exeter, Rhode Island.

In January 2025, Providence College opened The Ben Mondor Center for Nursing and Health Sciences, a state of the art facility.
