= Pawtucket Indians =

American minor league baseball team

Information
- Affiliations: Cleveland Indians
- League: MiLB (Eastern League)
- Location: Pawtucket, Rhode Island
- Ballpark: McCoy Stadium
- Founded: 1966
- Folded: 1967
- Last season: 67–71
- Former name: Reading Indians
- Manager: Red Davis

The Pawtucket Indians were a minor league baseball team affiliated with the Cleveland Indians. Located in Pawtucket, Rhode Island, the Pawtucket Indians existed from 1966 to 1967, playing in the Eastern League. They came into existence after 1965, when the Reading Indians moved to Pawtucket. They played their home games at McCoy Stadium. Despite compiling losing records in each of its two years of existence, the Indians drew 74,500 fans in 1966 and almost 61,500 in 1967, each time finishing second in attendance in the Eastern League.

== Notable alumni ==
- Ted Ford
- Fran Healy
- Mike Hedlund
- Tom Kelley
- Eddie Leon
- Dave Nelson
- Richie Scheinblum
- Oscar Zamora

== Year-by-year record ==
Year	Record	Finish	Manager	Playoffs
1966	68–71	2nd (t)	Clay Bryant	none
1967	67–71	7th	Red Davis	

Preceded by Reading Indians	Cleveland Indians; Double-A affiliate 1966–1967	Succeeded by Waterbury Indians
