= Pawtucket Red Sox =

American minor league professional baseball team

- 1970–2020; Pawtucket, Rhode Island

Team logo	Cap insignia

Minor league affiliations
- Class: Triple-A (1973–2020); Double-A (1970–1972)
- League: International League (1973–2020); Eastern League (1970–1972)

Major league affiliations
- Team: Boston Red Sox (1970–2020)

Minor league titles
- League titles (4): 1973; 1984; 2012; 2014
- Division titles (7): 1977; 1991; 1994; 1996; 2003; 2011; 2013
- Wild card berths (3): 2008; 2012; 2014

Team data
- Name: Pawtucket Red Sox (1977–2020): Rhode Island Red Sox (1976); Pawtucket Red Sox (1970–1975)
- Colors: Navy, red, white, light blue
- Mascots: Paws and Sox
- Ballpark: McCoy Stadium (1970–2020)
- Website: www.milb.com/pawtucket

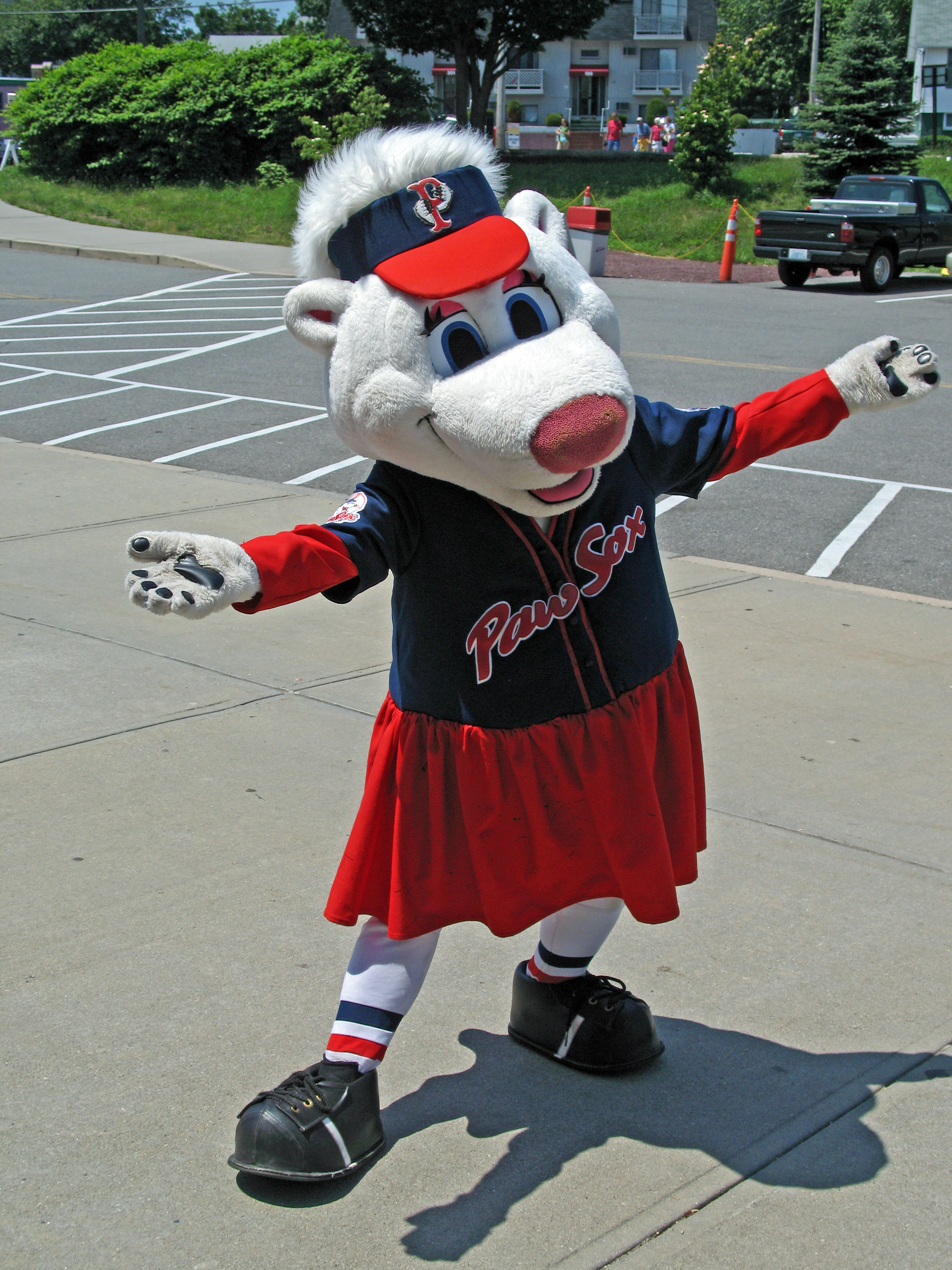
Female mascot, Sox. The male mascot is Paws.

The Pawtucket Red Sox, known colloquially as the PawSox, were a professional minor league baseball club based in Pawtucket, Rhode Island. From 1973 to 2020, the team was a member of the International League and served as the Triple-A affiliate of the Boston Red Sox. They played their home games at McCoy Stadium, and won four league championships, their last in 2014. Following the 2020 season, the franchise moved to Worcester, Massachusetts, to become the Worcester Red Sox.

The Pawtucket Red Sox were born as a Double-A Eastern League franchise in 1970. Three years later, Boston's Triple-A affiliate in the International League replaced the Eastern League PawSox. After enduring three different owners, at least two threats to move the team elsewhere, and bankruptcy, the PawSox were purchased from the International League by local industrialist Ben Mondor in January 1977. Over the next 38 years, Mondor (who died in 2010) and his heirs stabilized the franchise and turned it into a success; it was twice (1990 and 2003) selected the winner of Baseball America's Bob Freitas Award as the top Triple-A operation in minor league baseball, won the 1990 John H. Johnson President's Award, led its league in total attendance three times between 2004 and 2008, and captured three Governors' Cups as playoff champions.

On February 23, 2015, the team was sold to a group headed by then-Boston Red Sox president and chief executive officer Larry Lucchino and Rhode Island attorney James J. Skeffington. Thwarted in two attempts to replace McCoy Stadium with a new facility (first in adjacent Providence, then in a downtown site in Pawtucket), the club announced on August 17, 2018, that it would move to Worcester, located 42 miles (68 km) to the northwest at the opposite end of the Blackstone Valley, in 2021.

On June 30, 2020, it was announced that the 2020 Minor League Baseball season was cancelled, due to the COVID-19 pandemic in the United States. Thus, the team last played minor league games in Pawtucket during the 2019 season.

== Team history ==
=== Eastern League franchise (1970–1972) ===
The first team to be dubbed the Pawtucket Red Sox debuted at McCoy Stadium in 1970 as a member of the Double-A Eastern League. The franchise, owned by former Major League shortstop Joe Buzas, had spent the previous five seasons (1965–69) as the Pittsfield Red Sox after playing in four different Pennsylvania cities—Allentown, Johnstown, York and Reading—over seven years (1958–64).

After three seasons, Pawtucket's Eastern League franchise moved to Bristol, Connecticut, in 1973 to make room for the Triple-A PawSox, the former Louisville Colonels of the International League.

Carlton Fisk, the future Baseball Hall of Fame catcher, played for the Eastern League PawSox in 1970. Shortstop Rick Burleson and first baseman Cecil Cooper are among the players who toiled for both the Double-A and Triple-A versions of the team. This first edition of the PawSox franchise played for ten seasons as the Bristol Red Sox and then spent 33 seasons (1983–2015) in New Britain, Connecticut, the last 21 of them as the Rock Cats. In 2016, the Rock Cats moved to Connecticut's capital city, and were rechristened the Hartford Yard Goats.

The Cleveland Indians had also placed an Eastern League club in Pawtucket, in 1966–67. The Pawtucket Indians moved to Waterbury, Connecticut, in 1968. The Pawtucket Slaters, a Boston Braves farm club in the Class B New England League, represented the city from 1946 to 1949, when the NEL disbanded.

=== Roots in Toronto and Louisville ===
The Triple-A team that became the Pawtucket Red Sox began in 1896 as the Toronto Maple Leafs. It spent 72 consecutive seasons representing Ontario's capital city and won ten league championships before a deteriorating ballpark forced it to relocate to Louisville, Kentucky, following the 1967 season.

Louisville had spent the previous five years out of Organized Baseball. After the American Association and its Louisville Colonels franchise folded in 1962 and the American League owners voted down Charlie O. Finley's agreement to move the Kansas City A's to Louisville in 1964, Louisville was ready for the return of baseball. In 1968 the Maple Leafs, the Red Sox' top minor league club since 1965, were bought by Walter J. Dilbeck and moved to Louisville where they became the new Louisville Colonels and retained their affiliation with the Red Sox. They played at Fairgrounds Stadium on the Kentucky State Fairgrounds. While in Louisville, star players included Carlton Fisk (1971), Dwight Evans (1972), and Cecil Cooper (1972). The Louisville Colonels made the International League playoffs in 1969 and 1972.

=== Early struggles and bankruptcy (1973–1976) ===
In 1972, the Kentucky State Fair Board remodeled Cardinal Stadium so it could accommodate football. The renovations made the stadium unsuitable for baseball; among other things, it was far too large for a Triple-A team. However, the stadium was later used by the latter-day Louisville Redbirds club, setting minor league attendance records and outdrawing several major league teams. Following the 1972 season, the Louisville Colonels of the International League moved to McCoy Stadium and became the Pawtucket Red Sox, with Buzas taking over as owner.

The first Triple-A team was a success on the field, led by future major leaguers Cooper and Dick Pole, winning the 1973 Governors' Cup Championship in their inaugural year in the league over the Charleston Charlies. Then, they followed up by defeating the Tulsa Oilers of the American Association to win the Junior World Series. The following season they finished 30 games below .500 and lost an estimated $40,000. Buzas then sold the team to Philip Anez, a Smithfield advertising executive, in January 1975.

While the parent club was on their way to the 1975 World Series, the 1975 PawSox finished with a 53–87 mark. The team changed its name to the Rhode Island Red Sox for the 1976 season, but little changed on the field with a third straight sub-.500 season and falling attendance. Anez threatened to move his club to Jersey City, New Jersey. After the season, the franchise went bankrupt, unable to pay off $2 million worth of debt. The International League took it over, then awarded it in December 1976 to Massachusetts businessman Marvin Adelson, who renamed the team the New England Red Sox—and explored transferring it to Worcester. But after less than two months, in January 1977, the league revoked Adelson's franchise, alleging "nonperformance of terms and conditions".

=== The Ben Mondor era (1977–2015) ===
Although it appeared the Red Sox's stay in the Pawtucket area was about to come to an end, retired Lincoln businessman Ben Mondor stepped in and made sure the team remained in the city. Mondor was granted a brand-new franchise and restored the name to the Pawtucket Red Sox. However, it retained the old team's history and affiliation with the big-league Red Sox.

Mondor's tenure began inauspiciously. While the PawSox rebounded to win the regular-season pennant, they only drew 1,000 fans per game—believed to be the fewest for a first-place team in the history of the International League. That year's edition of the PawSox fell in the Governors' Cup finals to Charleston in four straight games. However, it won its second league championship in 1984, and drew almost 199,000 fans, second in the league.

For most of their first quarter-century in Rhode Island, the PawSox had to devote considerable resources to keeping McCoy Stadium at something approaching Triple-A standards. In 1998, Mondor and team president Mike Tamburro heavily renovated McCoy Stadium. The PawSox led the league in attendance in 2008, when 636,788 fans saw baseball at McCoy, an average of 9,097 for each of the 70 openings. In 2005, they set a franchise record with 688,421 tickets sold during the year. Kevin Youkilis played for the team in 2003, and completed a streak he started while in Portland: he reached base in 71 consecutive games, tying future teammate Kevin Millar's minor-league records for consecutive games reaching base.

In addition to their success at the box office, the PawSox have excelled on the field. In 2000, Pawtucket set an all-time franchise record for victories with 82, as the team completed their fifth-straight winning season. Three years later the PawSox would top their own record by winning 83 games. In 2008, they won 85 games. The 1984 team defeated the now-defunct Maine Guides 3–2 to win the 1984 Governors' Cup trophy for their second championship in Pawtucket Red Sox history. In 2012, the PawSox defeated the Charlotte Knights to win the Governors' Cup for a third time. A fourth title was won in 2014 when the PawSox took down the Durham Bulls in five games.

The origins of the team's most popular nickname, "PawSox," dates to the first season in which Mondor owned the club. Three weeks before the 1977 season began the team lacked uniforms. BoSox vice president Haywood Sullivan stepped in and sent Pawtucket 48 sets of old home and away uniforms from the parent club. Although the home uniforms were fine for the team to use, the road uniforms had "Boston" stitched across the chest, which was a problem. Tamburro suggested using the name "PawSox" across the front, with each unstitched "Boston" letter replaced with one that spelled "PawSox". Thus, the PawSox name was born out of the necessity of a uniform crisis.

Mondor died on October 3, 2010, at the age of 85. His widow, Madeleine, became the new majority owner of the PawSox.

=== Sale and Rhode Island stadium plans (2015–2018) ===
On November 29, 2014, it was reported that members of the Boston Red Sox' ownership group were in the process of purchasing the PawSox from Madeleine Mondor and two long-time executives who also held stock in the team: president Tamburro and vice president and general manager Lou Schwechheimer.

Nearly three months later, on February 23, the sale to Lucchino, Skeffington and their partners was formally announced. Lucchino added the title of chairman of the PawSox to his Boston responsibilities, and Skeffington became club president. Other partners included Rhode Island businessmen Bernard Cammarata, William P. Egan, Habib Gorgi, J. Terrence Murray and Thomas M. Ryan, as well as Fenway Sports Management (a division of the BoSox' parent company, Fenway Sports Group), and two limited partners in FSG, Arthur E. Nicholas and Frank M. Resnek.

That day, the new owners also announced their intention to move the team out of McCoy Stadium, build a new baseball park six miles (9.65 km) to the south in downtown Providence, and begin play there as early as 2017. Skeffington said the club would be renamed the Rhode Island Red Sox upon the move. That name was previously used by the 1976 edition of the PawSox, before Mondor purchased the team and restored its Pawtucket identity. In the weeks following announcement of the sale, Skeffington led a media tour of the proposed new stadium site on the Providence River and, with Lucchino, served as a point person in negotiations with state and local officials over public financing arrangements for the new park.

However, Skeffington, 73, died from a heart attack while jogging near his Barrington home on May 17, 2015, disrupting the team's efforts to secure an agreement with Rhode Island officials. Then, on August 1, Lucchino announced his retirement as the CEO and president of the Boston Red Sox, effective at the end of the 2015 season.

In September, Governor Gina Raimondo told Lucchino that the riverfront parcel, consisting of public land formerly occupied by Interstate 195 and private property owned by Brown University, "was not suitable and there were too many obstacles that remained." In the wake of the setback, Lucchino said that the team preferred to remain in Rhode Island, but neither he nor other PawSox officials immediately commented about possible alternative locations. In the ensuing weeks, reports surfaced that Worcester and two other Massachusetts cities—Springfield and Fall River—might bid for the team.

On November 5, Skeffington's position was filled when Dr. Charles Steinberg, longtime Lucchino aide and a senior public affairs and PR executive with four big-league teams, including the Red Sox, became club president. Tamburro remained on board as vice chairman, and Dan Rea III became the PawSox' new general manager, after Schwechheimer departed to join an ownership group that purchased the Triple-A New Orleans Zephyrs. Amidst the uncertainty over its longterm home, Steinberg committed the team to remaining in Pawtucket for five seasons, through 2020, and to rebuilding its relationship with its fans.

During the summer of 2016, the city, state and team began a feasibility study to determine the extent of needed renovations to McCoy Stadium. That study concluded that renovating McCoy would cost $68 million, while building a new stadium on the site would cost $78 million. On May 16, 2017, a downtown Pawtucket stadium proposal, The Ballpark at Slater Mill, was jointly announced by Lucchino and Pawtucket's mayor, Donald Grebien. The ballpark, to be built on a site bracketed by Interstate 95 and the Blackstone River, would cost an estimated $83 million, with the team footing $45 million, the state $23 million, and the city the remaining $15 million. But when the stadium project went before the Rhode Island General Assembly in 2018, the financing formula was amended to shift the risk of borrowing money from the state to investors, thus exposing them to potentially higher interest rates. The amended bill passed, and was signed into law by Raimondo on June 29, 2018.

=== Final season and relocation to Worcester (2019–2021) ===
The new financing arrangement was rejected by the PawSox ownership. On August 17, 2018, the team announced that it would relocate to a new stadium in Worcester in April 2021. The stadium was to be part of a $240 million redevelopment of Worcester's Kelley Square and Canal District. The move would end the team's history in Pawtucket after 51 seasons.

Alluding to "controversy, disagreement and opposition", apparently on the part of Rhode Island legislators who changed the Pawtucket stadium's financing formula, Lucchino said that a 35-page letter of intent had been signed with Worcester's mayor and city manager for the downtown ballpark project to house the relocated team. The announcement capped a concerted three-year effort by Worcester and Massachusetts officials and local business leaders to woo the PawSox to anchor a downtown redevelopment that includes the stadium, new housing, a hotel, a parking garage and redesign of the Kelley Square intersection. On September 12, 2018, the Worcester City Council voted 9–1 to approve the stadium proposal, paving the way for the PawSox' relocation.

During the 2019 season of the International League, Pawtucket finished last in the North Division, with a record of 59–81. The team's final game was played on September 2, 2019; it was a 5–4 home victory over the Lehigh Valley IronPigs in 10 innings.

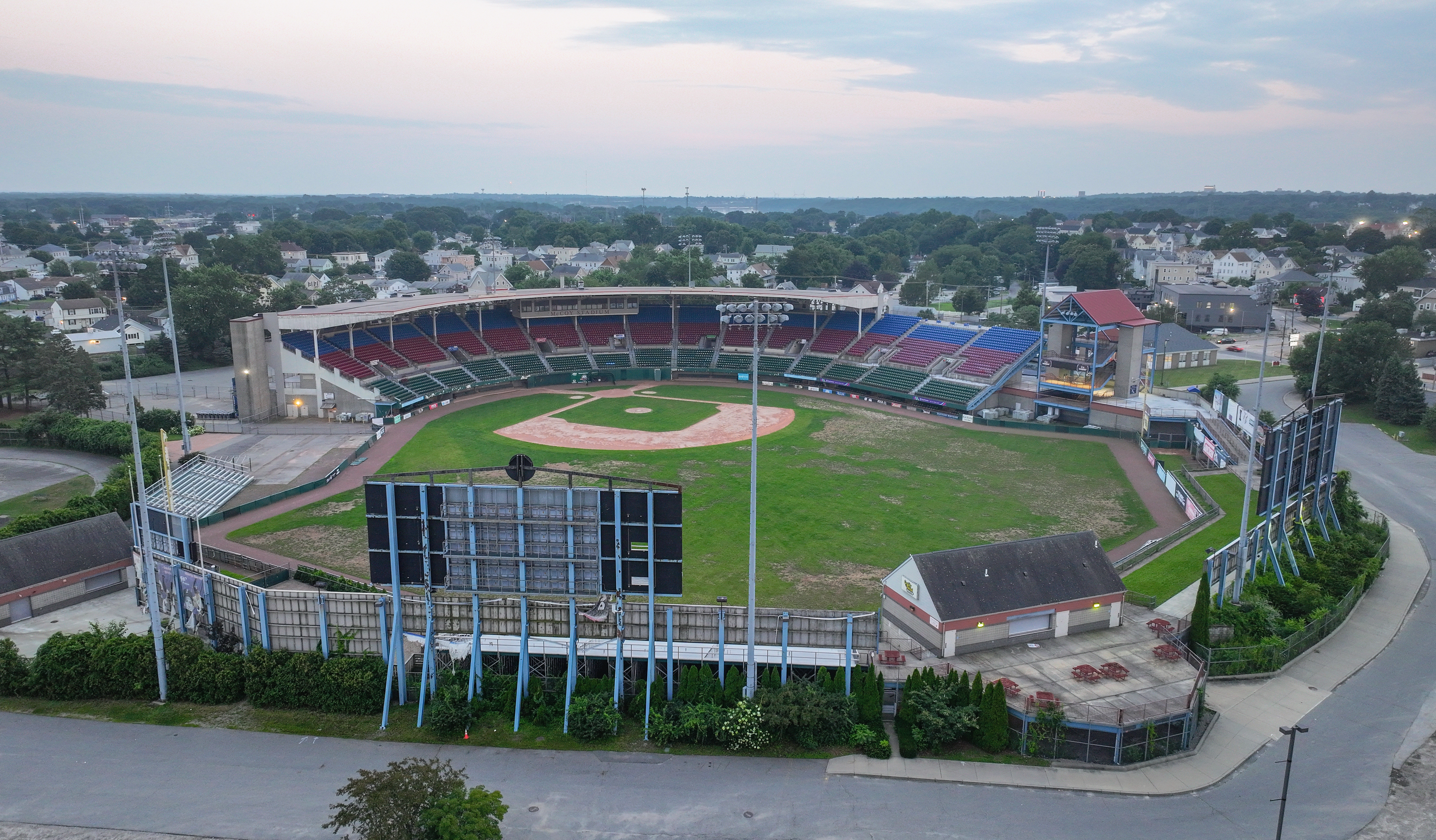
Aerial view of the abandoned McCoy Stadium in 2023

While 2020 was planned to be the team's final season of play in the International League, the Minor League Baseball season was cancelled, due to the COVID-19 pandemic in the United States. During the 2020 Major League Baseball season, McCoy Stadium served as the alternate training site for the Boston Red Sox. By December 5, the team began to sell off 1,000 pieces of memorabilia in an online auction hosted on the PawSox website as well as on Cox Cable TV, while also announcing the team would be taking select artifacts to be put on display at Polar Park in Worcester.

The Pawtucket Red Sox' regular season record over the half-century (1970 through 2019) of their existence was 3,461–3,610, for a winning percentage of .490.

On January 11, 2021, the City of Pawtucket announced that it would be filing a lawsuit against Pawtucket Red Sox Baseball Club LLC for breach of contract, in that McCoy Stadium was not kept up to standards or renovations, citing that "the City of Pawtucket will be exposed for the entire facility and upkeep which was originally the responsibility of the State and PawSox, leaving the burden on the taxpayers to fix or knock down the facility," In a statement, the PawSox were "Stunned to learn of this unfounded lawsuit from our friends and long-time partners at the City of Pawtucket, We will now allow the legal process to run its course, and therefore have no further comment at this time."

== "The Longest Game" ==
The PawSox played in and won the longest game in professional baseball history. The game against the Rochester Red Wings at McCoy Stadium started on April 18, 1981, and lasted 33 innings. Play was suspended at 4:07 a.m. at the end of the 32nd inning. The game did not resume again until June 23, when the Red Wings returned to Pawtucket. Only one inning was needed, with the PawSox winning 3–2 in the bottom of the 33rd when first baseman Dave Koza drove in the leadoff hitter, second baseman Marty Barrett, with a bases-loaded single off Cliff Speck. Neither Speck nor Steve Grilli, the Red Wings losing pitcher, were even on the team's roster back in April. Future major league Hall of Fame players Cal Ripken Jr. and Wade Boggs played in the game.

On June 23, 2006, the PawSox celebrated the 25th anniversary of "The Longest Game" with events and festivities when they played the Columbus Clippers. The 35th anniversary was also commemorated on April 19, 2016.

== Perfect games ==
- Tomo Ohka pitched a nine-inning perfect game for the Pawtucket Red Sox on June 1, 2000. Ohka retired all 27 batters he faced in a 2–0 win over the Charlotte Knights, and he needed just 76 pitches to toss the first nine-inning perfect game in the International League since 1952.
- On August 10, 2003, Bronson Arroyo pitched the fourth nine-inning perfect game in the 121-year history of the International League as the PawSox beat the Buffalo Bisons 7–0 at McCoy Stadium. He needed 101 pitches to throw his masterpiece (73 strikes), struck out nine, and got 10 fly outs and eight ground outs from the Buffalo 27 batters. He went to a three-ball count to just three hitters all game. At the end of the month, he was promoted to the majors, and remained with the Red Sox until the 2005–06 offseason, when the Red Sox traded him to the Cincinnati Reds for Wily Mo Pena.

== Hall of Famers ==
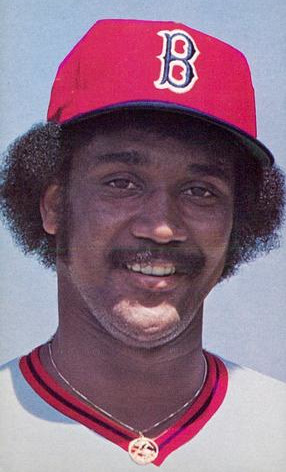
Jim Rice is an inductee of the International League Hall of Fame, the National Baseball Hall of Fame, and the PawSox Hall of Fame.

Several PawSox players and personnel have been inducted into the International League Hall of Fame. They are owner Ben Mondor, manager Joe Morgan, outfielder Jim Rice, third baseman Wade Boggs, and then-team president Mike Tamburro, now their Vice Chairman. Several former PawSox players have also been inducted into the National Baseball Hall of Fame in Cooperstown, New York, including Carlton Fisk, Boggs and Rice.

In July 2016, Rice, Boggs, and Mondor (represented by his widow Madeleine) became the inaugural class of inductees into the PawSox Hall of Fame. Additions are considered on an annual basis.

Pawtucket Red Sox Hall of Fame
Person	Role	Induction date	Ref.
Ben Mondor	Owner	July 28, 2016	
Jim Rice	Player	July 28, 2016	
Wade Boggs	Player	July 28, 2016	
Joe Morgan	Manager	July 23, 2017	
Mo Vaughn	Player	July 23, 2017	
Carlton Fisk	Player	August 27, 2017	
Mike Tamburro	Executive	May 26, 2018	
Fred Lynn	Player	May 26, 2018	
Roger Clemens	Player	June 21, 2019	

== Titles ==
The PawSox won the Governors' Cup, the championship of the IL, four times, and played in the championship series nine times. They also played in the championship of Triple-A baseball on three occasions: in 1973 they defeated the Tulsa Oilers 4 games to 1 in the Junior World Series, in 2012 they fell to the Reno Aces 10–3 in the Triple-A National Championship Game, and in 2014, the team was defeated by the Omaha Storm Chasers 4–2.

- 1973 Defeated Charleston (now Scranton/Wilkes-Barre)
- 1977 Lost to Charleston (now Scranton/Wilkes-Barre)
- 1978 Lost to Richmond (now Gwinnett)
- 1984 Defeated Maine (now Scranton/Wilkes-Barre)
- 1991 Lost to Columbus
- 2003 Lost to Durham
- 2012 Defeated Charlotte
- 2013 Lost to Durham
- 2014 Defeated Durham

== Notable former players ==
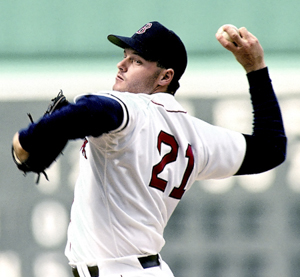
Roger Clemens

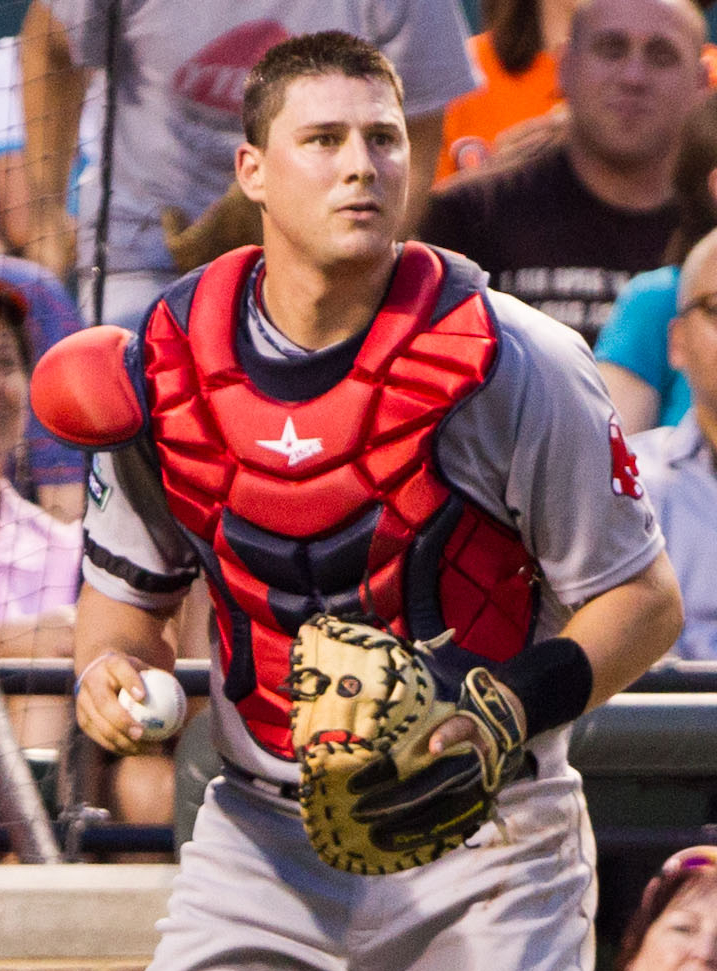
Ryan Lavarnway

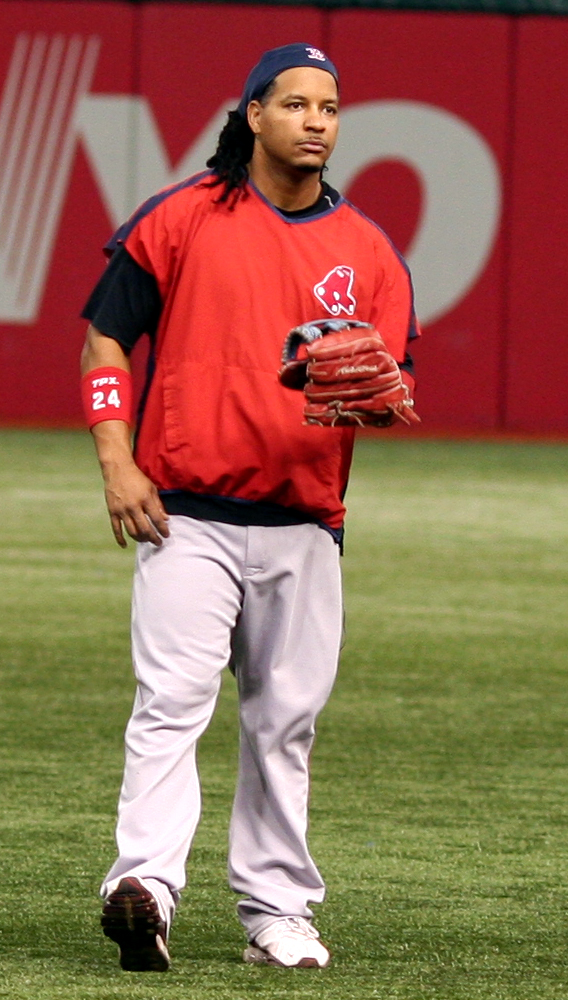
Manny Ramirez (rehab assignment)

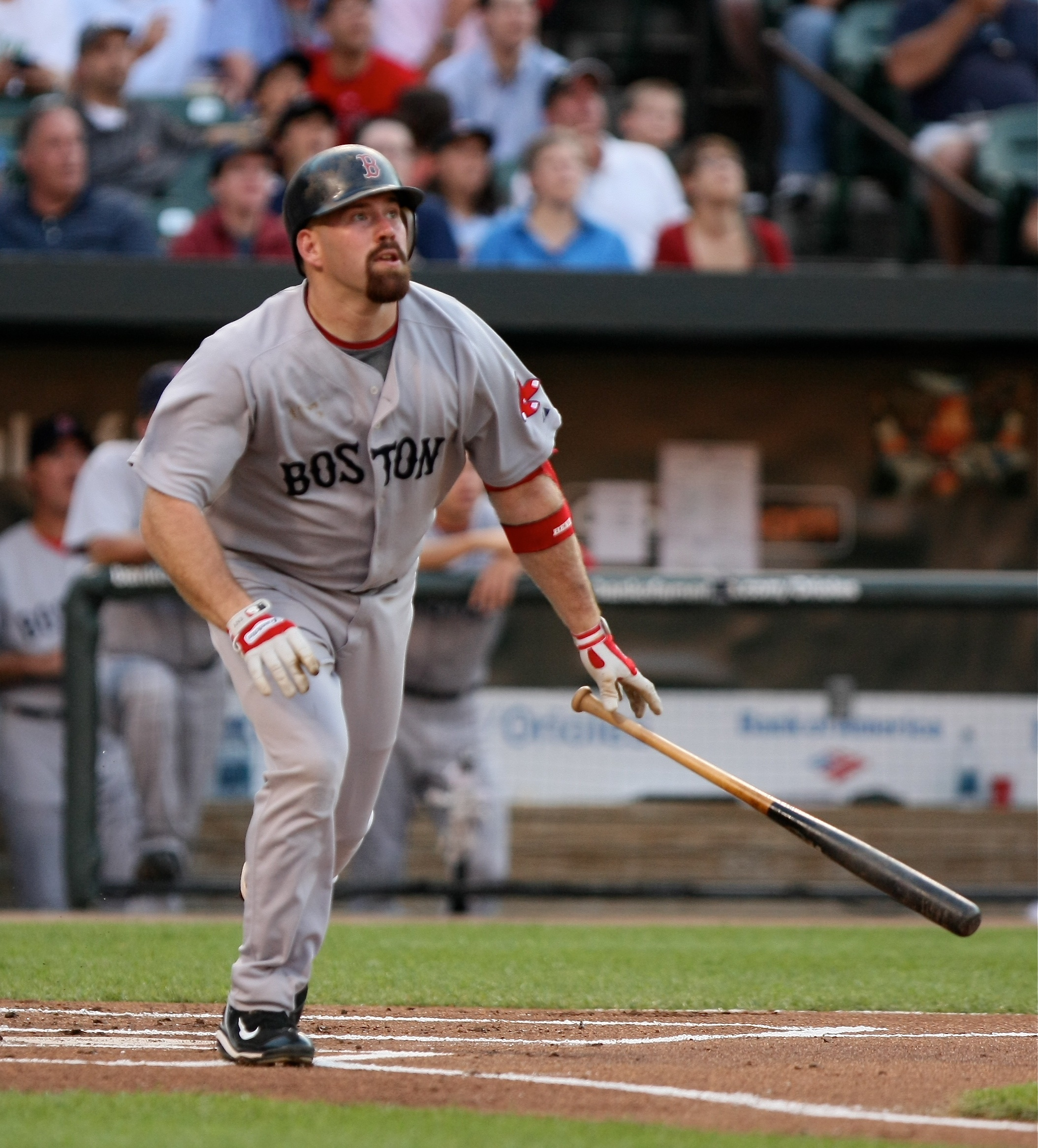
Kevin Youkilis

- Don Aase 1975–77
- Andy Abad 1997–99, 2003
- Izzy Alcántara 1999–2001
- Bronson Arroyo 2003
- Steve Avery 1997–98
- Marty Barrett 1981–83, 1989*
- Rod Beck 2000
- Todd Benzinger 1985–87
- Mookie Betts 2014
- Wade Boggs 1980–81
- Oil Can Boyd 1983–84, 1987, 1989
- Craig Breslow 2006–07, 2013
- Clay Buchholz 2007–09
- Ellis Burks 1987, 1989*
- José Canseco 1995*, 1996*
- John Cerutti 1992
- Roger Clemens 1983–84, 1993*, 1995*
- Tony Conigliaro 1975
- Cecil Cooper 1973
- Wil Cordero 1996
- Jim Corsi 1997–98
- Brian Daubach 1999, 2001, 2004
- Bo Díaz 1976–77
- Gary DiSarcina 2002
- Dennis Eckersley 1998*
- David Eckstein 2000
- Sang-Hoon Lee 2000–01
- Jacoby Ellsbury 2007, 2010*, 2011*
- Mark Fidrych 1982–83
- John Flaherty 1990–93
- Scott Fletcher 1994
- Jeff Frye 1999
- Nomar Garciaparra 1996, 2001*
- Rich Gedman 1980–81, 1988
- Álex González 2006*
- Mike Greenwell 1985–86, 1995*, 1996*
- Mark Guthrie 1999
- Bill Haselman 2003
- Scott Hatteberg 1993–96, 1999
- Dustin Hermanson 2002
- Ken Hill 2001
- Sam Horn 1986–89
- Bruce Hurst 1980–81
- Byung-hyun Kim 2004
- Gabe Kapler 2005*, 2006*
- Ryan Lavarnway, 2011–14
- Jon Lester 2006, 2007*
- Steve Lyons 1984, 1992–93
- Fred Lynn 1974
- Ramón Martínez 1999*
- Justin Masterson 2008
- Daisuke Matsuzaka 2012*
- Joe McEwing 2007
- Willie McGee 1995*
- Lou Merloni 1996–2001
- Wade Miller 2005*
- Kevin Mitchell 1996*
- Bill Mueller 2004*
- Tim Naehring 1989–90, 1992–94*
- Trot Nixon 1997–98, 2004*, 2005*, 2006*
- Alex Ochoa 2007
- Tomo Ohka 1999–2001
- Bobby Ojeda 1980–81
- John Olerud 2005*
- Jonathan Papelbon 2005
- Carl Pavano 1997
- Dustin Pedroia 2005–06
- Dick Pole 1973–74
- Arquimedez Pozo 1996–98
- David Price 2017*
- Paul Quantrill 1991–92
- Manny Ramírez 2002*
- Jim Rice 1973–74
- Ken Ryan 1991–93, 1995
- Bret Saberhagen 1997*, 2000*
- Pablo Sandoval 2017*
- Curt Schilling 2005*
- Calvin Schiraldi 1986
- Aaron Sele 1993, 1995–96
- Earl Snyder 2003–04
- Matt Stairs 1995
- Bob Stanley 1988*
- Dave Stapleton 1977–80, 1985
- Jeff Suppan 1995–97
- Mike Timlin 2007*
- Michael Tucker 2007
- John Valentin 1991–94, 2001*
- Jason Varitek 1997, 2006*
- Mo Vaughn 1990–92
- Tim Wakefield 1995
- David Wells 2006*
- Mark Whiten 1995
- Kevin Youkilis 2003–05

(*) = rehab assignment

== Yearly results ==
Year	W	L	Pct.	Finish	GA/GB	Manager
1970	68	70	.493	4th Eastern League	−9.5	Matt Sczesny
1971	63	76	.453	7th Eastern League	−16	Billy Gardner
1972	61	79	.436	7th Eastern League	−23	Don Lock
1973	78	68	.534	2nd International League*	−1	Darrell Johnson
1974	57	87	.396	4th International League	−31	Joe Morgan
1975	53	87	.379	8th International League	−32.5	Joe Morgan
1976	68	70	.493	5th International League	−20	Joe Morgan
1977	80	60	.571	1st International League	+2	Joe Morgan
1978	81	59	.579	2nd International League	−4	Joe Morgan
1979	66	74	.471	5th International League	−19.5	Joe Morgan
1980	62	77	.446	7th International League	−20.5	Joe Morgan
1981	67	73	.479	6th International League	−21.5	Joe Morgan
1982	67	71	.489	5th International League	−14.5	Joe Morgan
1983	56	83	.403	8th International League	−26.5	Tony Torchia
1984	75	65	.536	4th International League*	−7.5	Tony Torchia
1985	48	91	.345	8th International League	−30.5	Rac Slider
1986	74	65	.532	3rd International League	−5.5	Ed Nottle
1987	73	67	.521	4th International League	−8	Ed Nottle
1988	63	79	.444	3rd IL East	−14.5	Ed Nottle
1989	62	84	.425	4th IL East	−21.5	Ed Nottle
1990	62	84	.425	4th IL East	−27.5	Ed Nottle (through 6/26) Johnny Pesky (from 6/27)
1991	79	64	.552	1st IL East	+3.5	Butch Hobson
1992	71	72	.497	2nd IL East	−13.5	Rico Petrocelli
1993	60	82	.423	4th IL East	−14.5	Buddy Bailey
1994	78	64	.549	1st IL East	+7	Buddy Bailey
1995	70	71	.492	3rd IL East	−2.5	Buddy Bailey
1996	78	64	.549	1st IL East	+5.5	Buddy Bailey
1997	81	60	.574	2nd IL East	−2	Ken Macha
1998	77	64	.546	3rd IL North	−3	Ken Macha
1999	76	68	.528	2nd IL North	−2	Gary Jones
2000	82	61	.573	3rd IL North	−3	Gary Jones
2001	60	82	.423	5th IL North	−31	Gary Jones
2002	60	84	.417	5th IL North	−31	Buddy Bailey
2003	83	61	.576	1st IL North	+4	Buddy Bailey
2004	73	71	.507	2nd IL North	−10	Buddy Bailey
2005	75	69	.521	2nd IL North	−7	Ron Johnson
2006	69	75	.479	5th IL North	−16	Ron Johnson
2007	67	75	.472	4th IL North	−16.5	Ron Johnson
2008	85	58	.594	2nd IL North	−2.5	Ron Johnson
2009	61	82	.427	5th IL North	−21	Ron Johnson
2010	66	78	.458	4th IL North	−21.5	Torey Lovullo
2011	81	61	.570	1st IL North	+2	Arnie Beyeler
2012	79	65	.549	2nd IL North*	−5	Arnie Beyeler
2013	80	63	.559	1st IL North	+3.5	Gary DiSarcina
2014	79	65	.549	2nd IL North*	−2.5	Kevin Boles
2015	59	85	.410	6th IL North	−22	Kevin Boles
2016	74	68	.521	4th IL North	−16.5	Kevin Boles
2017	67	75	.472	4th IL North	−19.5	Kevin Boles
2018	66	73	.475	3rd IL North	−17.5	Kevin Boles
2019	59	81	.421	6th IL North	−16.5	Billy McMillon

(*= Won Governors' Cup)

== Playoff history ==
Year	W	L	Result	Round	W	L	Result	Round	W	L	Result	Round
1973	3	2	Beat Tidewater	1st round of playoffs	3	2	Beat Charleston	Governors' Cup championship	4	1	Beat Tulsa	Junior World Series
1977	3	1	Beat Richmond	1st round of playoffs	0	4	Lost to Charleston	Governors' Cup championship	–	–	–	–
1978	3	2	Beat Toledo	1st round of playoffs	3	4	Lost to Richmond	Governors' Cup championship	–	–	–	–
1984	3	1	Beat Columbus	1st round of playoffs	3	2	Beat Maine	Governors' Cup championship	–	–	–	–
1986	1	3	Lost to Rochester	1st round of playoffs	–	–	–	–	–	–	–	–
1987	1	3	Lost to Tidewater	1st round of playoffs	–	–	–	–	–	–	–	–
1991	–	–	–	–	0	3	Lost to Columbus	Governors' Cup championship	–	–	–	–
1992	1	3	Lost to Scranton	IL East championship	–	–	–	–	–	–	–	–
1994	1	3	Lost to Syracuse	IL East championship	–	–	–	–	–	–	–	–
1996	1	3	Lost to Rochester	IL East championship	–	–	–	–	–	–	–	–
1997	1	3	Lost to Rochester	IL East championship	–	–	–	–	–	–	–	–
2003	3	2	Beat Ottawa	1st round of playoffs	0	3	Lost to Durham	Governors' Cup championship	–	–	–	–
2008	1	3	Lost to Scranton	1st round of playoffs	–	–	–	–	–	–	–	–
2011	0	3	Lost to Lehigh	1st round of playoffs	–	–	–	–	–	–	–	–
2012	3	1	Beat Scranton	1st round of playoffs	3	0	Beat Charlotte	Governors' Cup championship	0	1	Lost to Reno	Triple-A National Championship
2013	3	2	Beat Rochester	1st round of playoffs	1	3	Lost to Durham	Governors' Cup championship	–	–	–	–
2014	3	0	Beat Syracuse	1st round of playoffs	3	2	Beat Durham	Governors' Cup championship	0	1	Lost to Omaha	Triple-A National Championship

== Triple-A managerial history ==
Name	Record	Win Pct.	Duration
Darrell Johnson	78–68	.534	1973
Joe Morgan	601–658	.477	1974–1982
Tony Torchia	131–148	.470	1983–1984
Rac Slider	48–91	.345	1985
Ed Nottle	302–338	.472	1986–1990 (June 26)
Johnny Pesky	32–41	.438	1990 (June 27 – September 3)
Butch Hobson	79–64	.552	1991
Rico Petrocelli	71–72	.497	1992
Buddy Bailey	502–497	.503	1993–1996; 2002–2004
Ken Macha	158–124	.560	1997–1998
Gary Jones	218–211	.508	1999–2001
Ron Johnson	357–359	.499	2005–2009
Torey Lovullo	66–78	.458	2010
Arnie Beyeler	160–126	.559	2011–2012
Gary DiSarcina	80–63	.559	2013
Kevin Boles	288–301	.489	2014–2018
Billy McMillon	59–81	.421	2019–2020
Totals	3230–3320	.493	1973–2020

== Broadcasters ==
As of March 2020, the announcers for the Pawsox Radio Network were Josh Maurer, Mike Antonellis, Jim Cain and Steve McDonald, of URI football and men's basketball. Pawtucket served as a springboard for multiple Major League Baseball broadcasters.

Preceded by Pittsfield Red Sox	Boston Red Sox; Double-A affiliate 1970–1972	Succeeded by Bristol Red Sox
Preceded by Louisville Colonels	Boston Red Sox; Triple-A affiliate 1973–2020	Succeeded by Worcester Red Sox
