= McCoy Stadium =

Former baseball stadium in Pawtucket, Rhode Island, U.S.

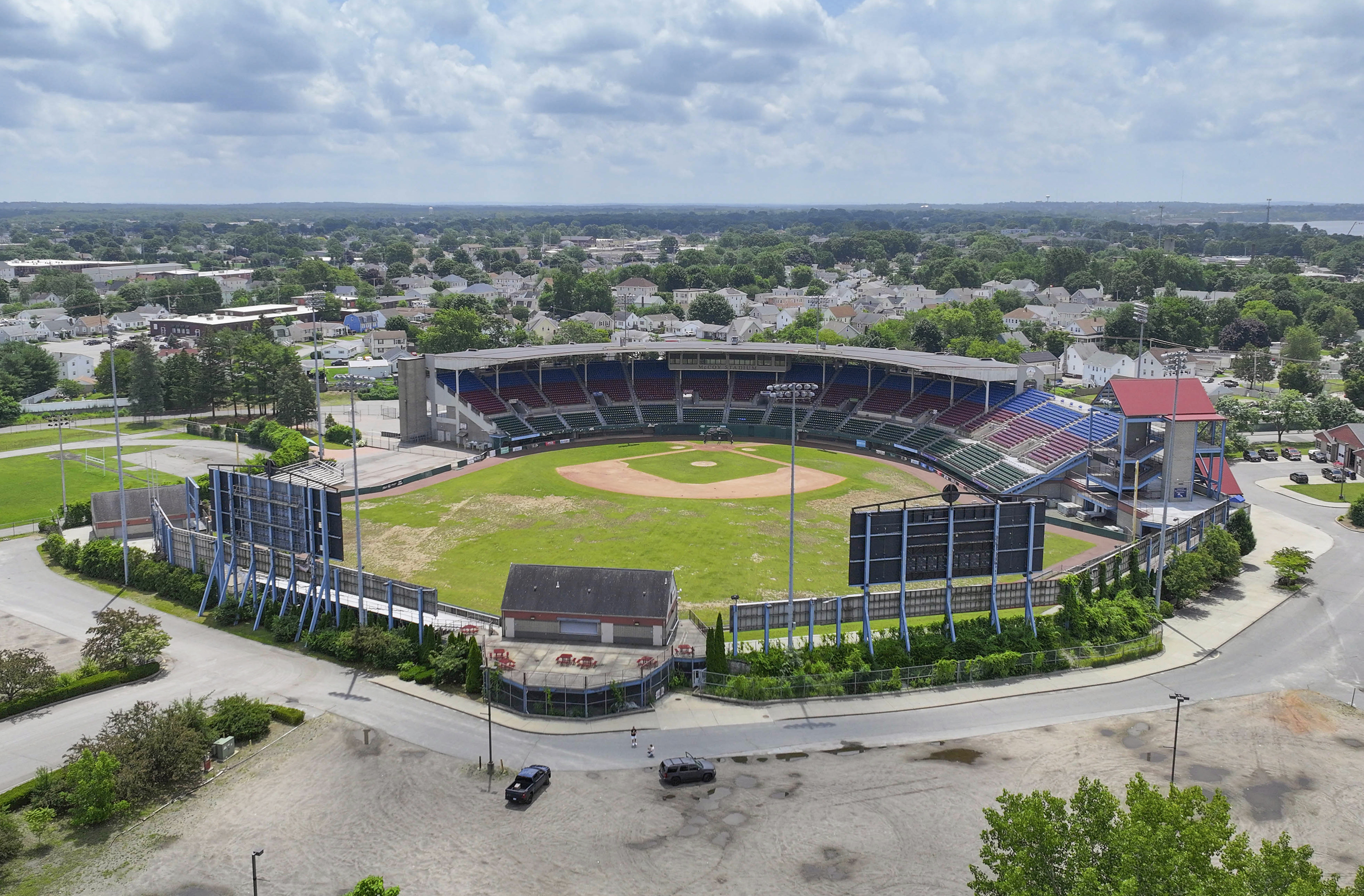
- View from the north in 2023

- Location within Rhode Island Location within the United States
- Interactive map of McCoy Stadium
- Location: One Columbus Avenue; Pawtucket, Rhode Island 02860
- Coordinates: 41°52′23.39″N 71°22′12.14″W
- Owner: City of Pawtucket
- Operator: Pawtucket Red Sox Baseball Club Inc.
- Capacity: 10,031 permanent seats. Up to 11,800 including grass berm, bleachers and standing room sections.
- Surface: Natural grass
- Record attendance: 11,982
- Field size: Foul lines: 325 feet (99 m); Alleys: 375 feet (114 m); Center field: 400 feet (120 m); Outfield fence: 8 feet (2.4 m), except 5 feet (1.5 m) at bullpens

Construction
- Groundbreaking: November 3, 1940
- Opened: July 5, 1942 (dedication)
- Renovated: 1998–99
- Expanded: 1998–99
- Closed: September 2, 2019 (final game); used during 2020 as a training site
- Demolished: 2025
- Cost: $1.5 million ($29.6 million in 2025 dollars) $14.914 million (renovation) ($28.8 million in 2025 dollars)
- Architects: Mark Linenthal; Thomas F. Harding; Heery International (renovation)

Tenants
- Pawtucket Slaters (NEL) 1946–1949; Rhode Island Steelers (ACFL) 1966; Pawtucket Indians (EL) 1966–1967; Pawtucket Red Sox (EL) 1970–1972; Pawtucket Red Sox (IL) 1973–2020

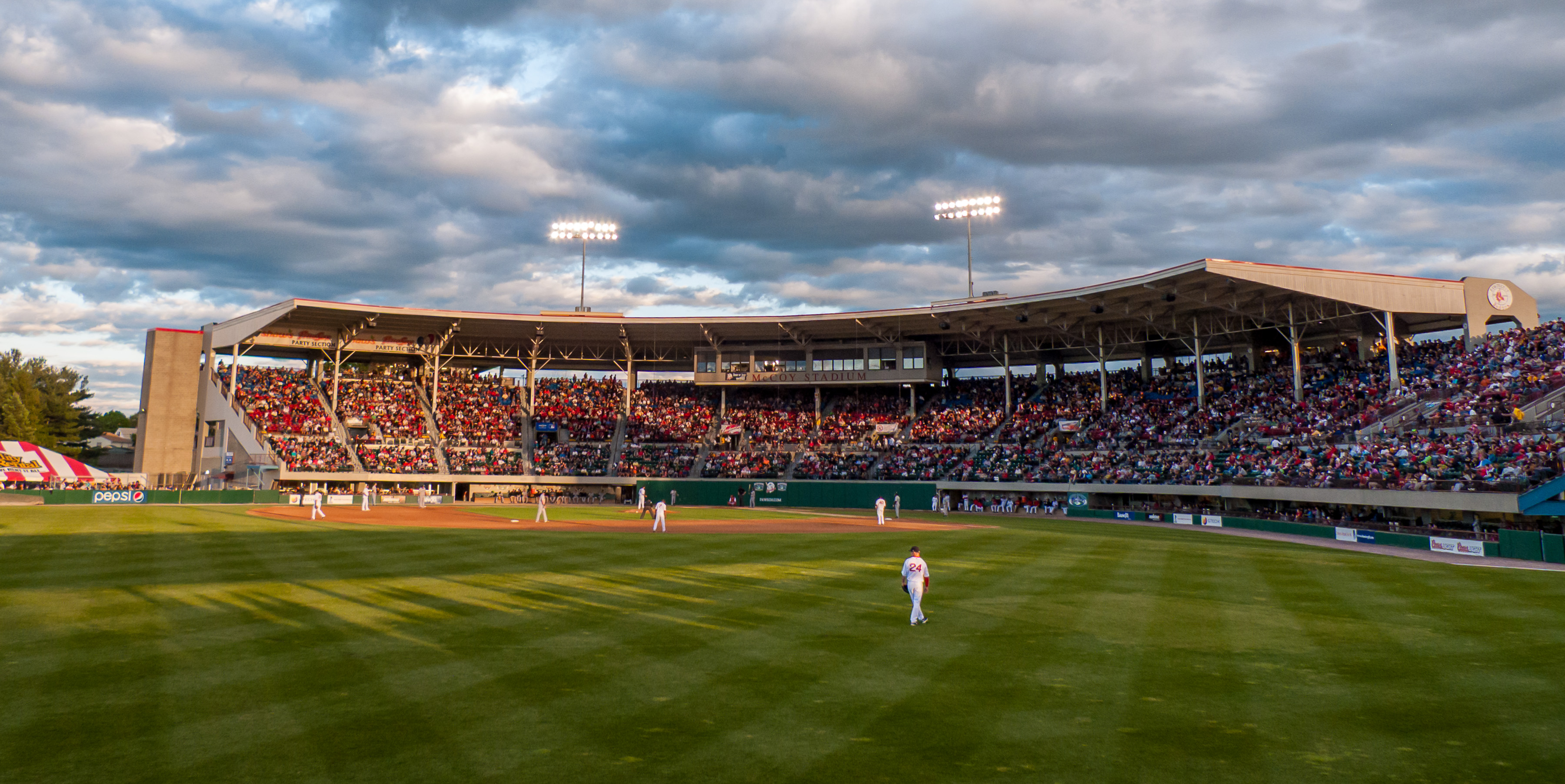
A game in 2010

McCoy Stadium was a baseball stadium in Pawtucket, Rhode Island. From 1970 through 2020, it served as home field of the Pawtucket Red Sox (PawSox), a Minor League Baseball affiliate of the Boston Red Sox. Completed in 1942, the stadium first hosted an affiliated minor league team in 1946, the Pawtucket Slaters, a Boston Braves farm team. In 1981, the stadium hosted the longest professional baseball game in history, as the PawSox defeated the Rochester Red Wings in 33 innings by a score of 3–2.

Demolition of the stadium began on March 24, 2025, and was "all but completed on May 27".

== History ==
=== Early years ===
The project to build the stadium began in 1938 and was championed by then-Pawtucket Mayor Thomas P. McCoy. It was to be built on a swampy piece of land known as Hammond's Pond and ultimately was located at the end of Pond Street. On the afternoon of November 3, 1940, Mayor McCoy laid the foundation cornerstone.

Pawtucket Stadium, as it was first known, was dedicated on July 5, 1942, and initially served as home ballpark of the Pawtucket Slaters. The Slaters competed in the New England League, then operating as an unaffiliated semi-professional league. The Slaters had won the league's 1941 championship. Prior to the dedication of Pawtucket Stadium, it is unclear if the team played there or at a different venue. On September 25, 1942, the Slaters lost to the Boston Red Sox in an exhibition game at Pawtucket Stadium; the Red Sox fielded players such as Ted Williams, Bobby Doerr, and Joe Cronin.

In 1946, the stadium was officially named in honor of Mayor McCoy, who had died in August 1945. The stadium first began hosting affiliated Minor League Baseball games in 1946. An affiliate of the Boston Braves, also named the Pawtucket Slaters, was the first team to call McCoy Stadium home. The team played for four seasons in the New England League, then operating at the Class B level. The Slaters and the New England League disbanded after the 1949 season.

Professional baseball remained absent from Pawtucket until 1966, when McCoy Stadium became home of the Pawtucket Indians, who competed at the Double-A level in the Eastern League as an affiliate of the Cleveland Indians. After the 1967 season, the Indians moved to Waterbury, Connecticut, and McCoy was again without a team.

=== Red Sox arrival ===
In 1969, the Boston Red Sox had their Eastern League affiliate, the Pittsfield Red Sox of Pittsfield, Massachusetts, play at McCoy Stadium twice—one game in July and a doubleheader in August; the two events drew a total of over 10,000 fans. After the season, it was reported that the Pittsfield Red Sox would be relocated to McCoy Stadium. The team moved prior to the 1970 season, becoming the Pawtucket Red Sox, known colloquially as the "PawSox". The franchise spent three seasons playing in the Double-A Eastern League before being promoted to the Triple-A International League.

In 1976, debt-ridden owner Phil Anez threatened to move the team to New Jersey, but sold the franchise to Marvin Adelson, who lost the ballclub after threatening to move to Massachusetts. During that year, the team was briefly known as the Rhode Island Red Sox, but that name lasted just one season. Just before the 1977 season, Canadian expatriate businessman Ben Mondor arrived and restructured the franchise. Mondor owned the team until his death on October 3, 2010.

The PawSox brought four championship titles to McCoy Stadium and Pawtucket, winning the Governors' Cup (the International League championship since 1933) in 1973, 1984, 2012, and 2014.

=== Renovation and expansion ===
Circa 1988–1991, ownership invested $4.5 million in general improvements, including new locker rooms and dugouts, a room for players' wives, and expanded training and storage space.

Despite the above, for many years McCoy Stadium was not up to International League standards. The park had only 6,000 seats and did not meet federal requirements for handicapped access. There were also a number of broken seats, and the facility was starting to show structural issues in the mid-1990s. For several years, the team's ownership was unsure of what to do, and there were inquiries from several other cities, including Worcester and Springfield in Massachusetts, should a move of the team be required.

Eventually, owner Ben Mondor announced that they would renovate the facility, and that renovations would be done to maintain the historical integrity of the ballpark. The renovations began following the 1998 season and included a new food court and a new terraced berm in left field, a grassy knoll where fans could sit next to the PawSox bullpen and watch the game up close.

A grand re-opening of the ballpark was held on April 14, 1999, as the PawSox defeated Rochester Red Wings by a 3–2 score—the game set a new single-game attendance record for the Pawtucket franchise, with 10,586 in attendance. Seating capacity was increased to 10,031 by adding three full sections of seats. In addition to the original quarter-circle seating bowl, the facility gained an extended left-field line seating area and souvenir stand, as well as outfield bleacher seating and new parking areas. Luxury boxes were constructed below the new seating area at field level. All seats were made accessed through an entry tower near third base, instead of the circular ramps behind home plate, which still remained. Seats were elevated above the field, and patrons would climb two sets of stairs or take an elevator to reach the main concourse and outfield berm areas.

Following renovations to the stadium, the Pawtucket Red Sox raised their average game day attendance to a league-leading 9,561 in 2005.

=== Red Sox departure ===
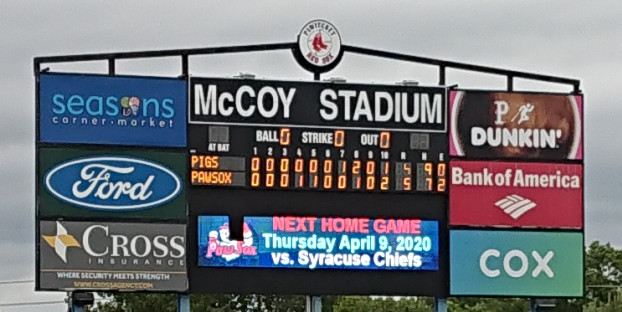
Scoreboard showing result of the last PawSox game

In February 2015, a group of New England business leaders, led by Larry Lucchino, purchased the Pawtucket Red Sox. In August 2018, ownership announced that it would relocate the team to a new stadium in Worcester, Massachusetts, in April 2021, becoming the Worcester Red Sox.

While 2020 was planned to be the PawSox' final season of play at McCoy Stadium, the Minor League Baseball season was cancelled, due to the COVID-19 pandemic in the United States. Thus, the final game contested by the PawSox at McCoy Stadium was the team's last game of the 2019 International League season, a 5–4 home victory over the Lehigh Valley IronPigs in 10 innings, played on September 2, 2019.

During the 2020 Major League Baseball season, McCoy Stadium served as the alternate training site for the Boston Red Sox.

== Closure and demolition ==
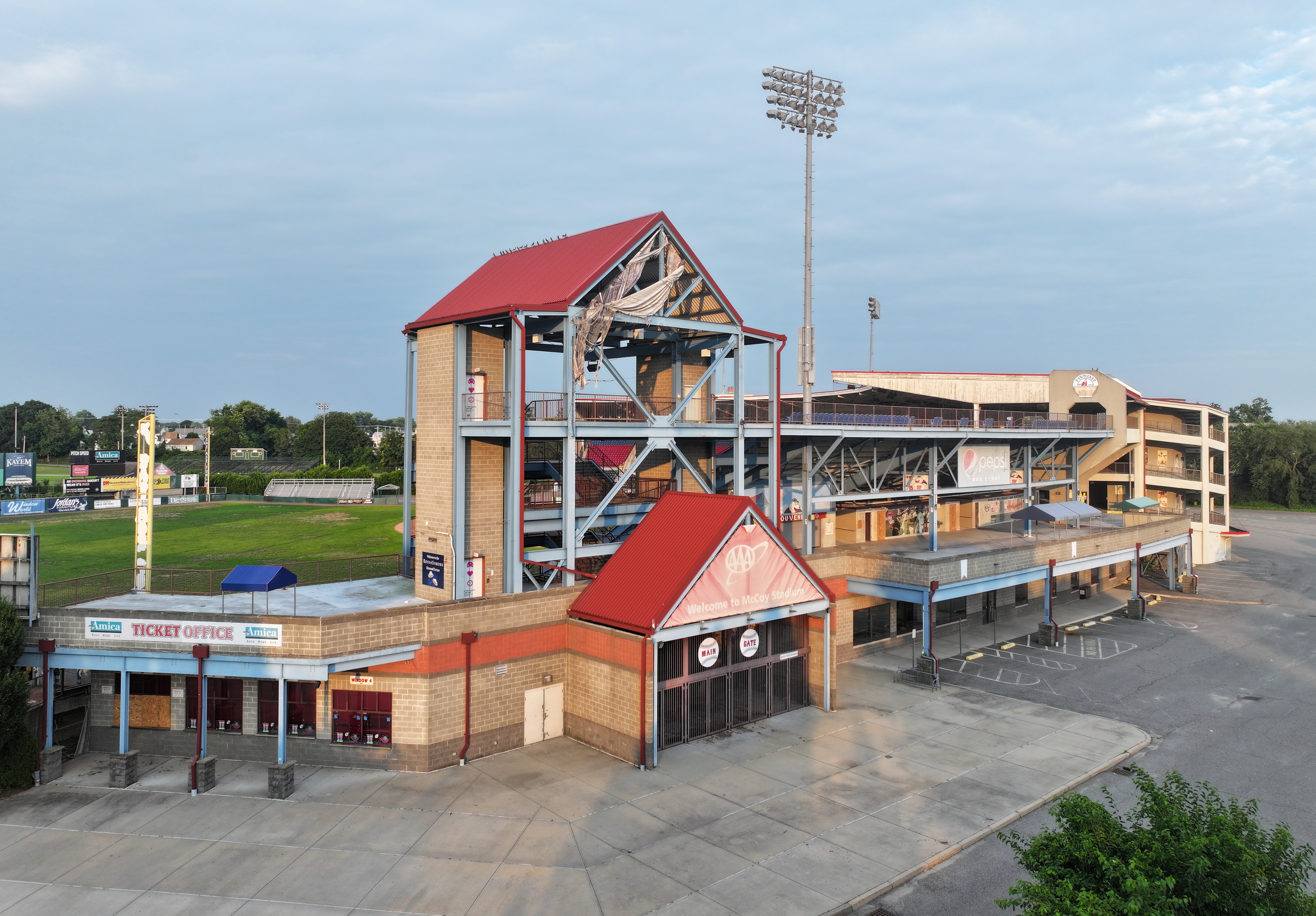
McCoy Stadium's abandoned exterior in 2023

Without the PawSox as a tenant, the future of McCoy Stadium became unclear. In December 2019, Pawtucket mayor Donald Grebien indicated alternatives to either bring another minor league team to Pawtucket or demolish the ballpark for a new use. The stadium sat vacant starting in 2021; the condition of the ballpark deteriorated due to the lack of active development on the property.

In May 2021, Grebien noted future opportunity with independent baseball leagues, or governmental use such as a public safety complex or high school. In December 2021, Grebien endorsed the explorations of a city panel which proposed total demolition of the city-owned site for the construction of a high school complex that would consolidate and replace the district's two existing schools. Initial renderings by SLAM architecture group showed a four-story academic complex with athletic facilities and an emphasis on CTE space. In November 2022, Pawtucket voters approved a $330 million bond to construct a new high school at the McCoy Stadium site. The proposed 482,000-square-foot (11.1-acre; 44,800 m^{2}) high school campus would consolidate Shea and Tolman high schools into one building for 2,500 students.

In July 2023, billionaire businessman Stefan Soloviev sought to purchase the stadium, fund the restorations needed, and try to bring in a minor league or independent league team. Pawtucket mayor Don Grebien thanked Soloviev for his interest and reiterated plans to demolish the stadium for the city's new high school.

It was announced in January 2024 that McCoy Stadium would be demolished within the year, but that did not occur. As of March 2025, demolition was scheduled to run from early April through June, although demolition was reported to be underway on March 24.

In May, a time capsule, which had been placed in the stadium in November 1940 during its construction, was recovered by workers. A second time capsule, believed to hold memorabilia from the 33-inning game played at McCoy in 1981, was found between home plate and the pitcher's mound. The two time capsules were opened on June 23, 2025 – the 44th anniversary of the game's completion. The capsule placed during the stadium's construction contained a letter from the Special Committee created for the Pawtucket Stadium and a souvenir program from the Pawtucket Sesqui-Centennial Cotton Celebration 1790–1940. The one honoring the 33-inning game held a commemorative poster, a 1981 PawSox program, the IL Official Scoring Form with the game's scorebook pages, a PawSox hat, and three baseballs signed by players from each team and others associated with the game.

The Providence Journal reported that demolition was "all but completed on May 27".

== Stadium features ==
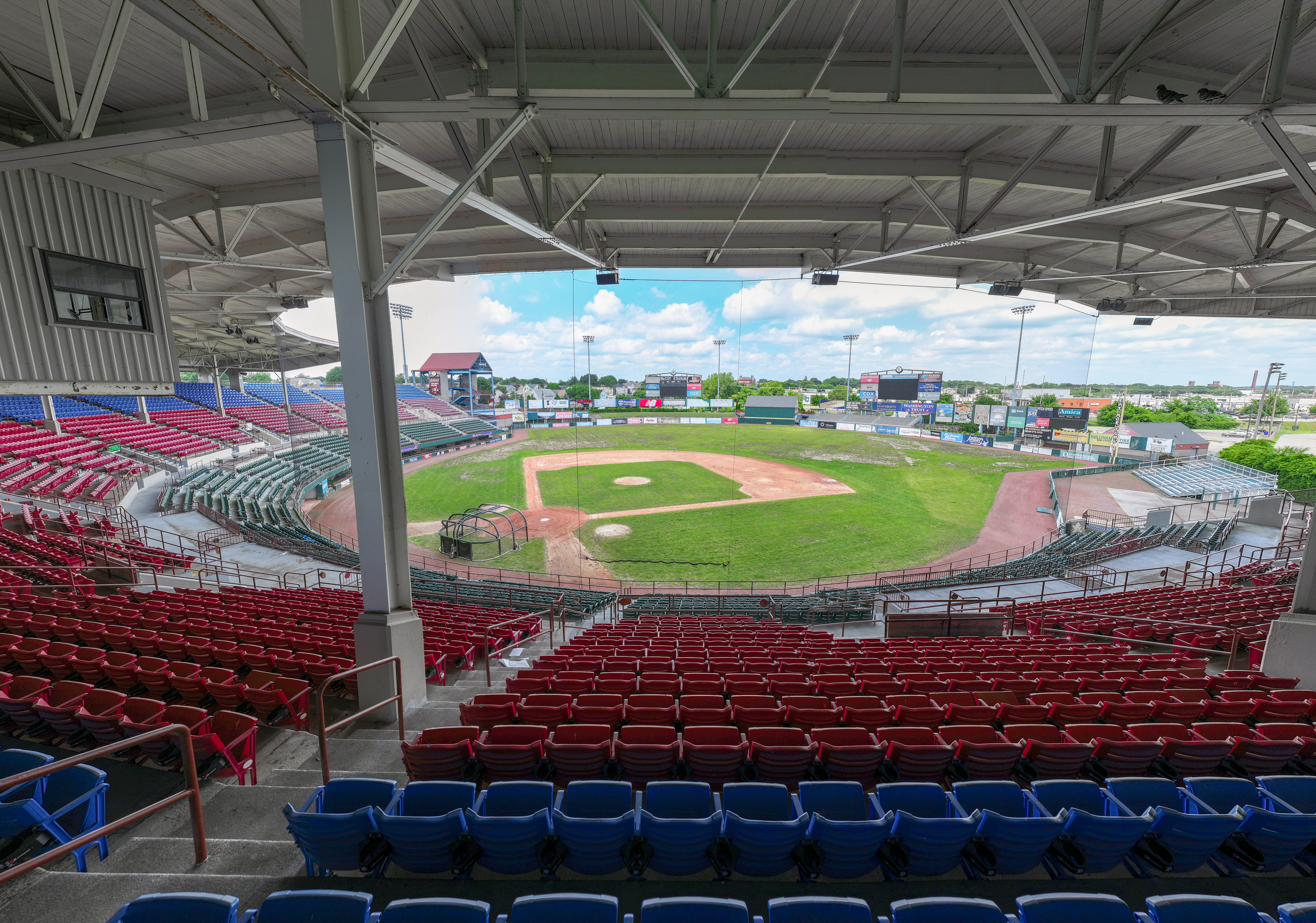
View from behind home plate

One of the unique features of the ballpark was the expansive foul territory. The foul area formed a complete semicircle between first and third, and in order to fit the baselines in between the ends of the seating areas, the area behind home plate was quite large. This was especially notable since the major-league Red Sox' home park, Fenway Park, has the smallest foul territory in the majors.

The two dugouts were embedded into the wall underneath the grandstands, as were the luxury boxes, just beyond them. The first row of seats was elevated 8 feet (2.4 m) above field level. Despite that unusual box seat elevation, those seeking autographs of the players found a way to contact their PawSox, using a technique more common to fans in bleacher seats behind an outfield wall. Fans wishing to have a scorebook, baseball, baseball card, or other souvenir signed by a player would go "fishing" for autographs. Complete with hook and reel (or, often, a hollowed-out milk jug and a rope), autograph seekers lowered their items over the front of the seats and dangled them down in front of the dugouts below. The ballplayers would sign the item, tug on the line, and the fan could then pull up their newly autographed memorabilia.

A series of murals depicting notable former PawSox players was displayed in the stadium prior to the 1998 renovation, but was taken down after, as the new stadium configuration resulted in fans no longer passing by them. In 2004, after many fans asked what happened to the murals, funds were made available to restore and re-hang them, as well as commission a few new ones of more recent players. Some six dozen paintings then adorned the entrance ramps throughout the stadium.

The left-field berm provided clear views of the action, and allowed families on a budget an inexpensive way to enjoy the ballpark. Above the berms were walkways, affording patrons 360-degree views of the ballpark. They walkways made especially for the handicapped, from which they could enjoy the game.

== Notable games and incidents ==
- On April 18, 1981, the Pawtucket Red Sox began the longest professional baseball game in history. For 20 innings, the PawSox battled the Rochester Red Wings in a 1–1 tie. The Red Wings finally scored in the top of the 21st inning to take the lead. The PawSox then scored a run in the bottom of the inning. The game was far from over. The game went on until 4:07 a.m. because the umpires did not have a curfew rule in their copy of the rule book. Finally the league president was reached and demanded that the game be suspended. The score was tied, 2–2 after the 32nd inning. When the game finally did resume on June 23, it took only 18 minutes to complete, as Dave Koza of the PawSox drove in the winning run in the bottom of the 33rd inning. Two future Hall of Famers were part of the historic game. Cal Ripken Jr. went 2–13 on the night playing third base for Rochester. Wade Boggs played third base for Pawtucket and went 4–12 with a double and an RBI. 19 fans remained in the stands when the game was called for the night, and they received lifetime passes to McCoy Stadium.
- On April 9, 1992, during the PawSox' home opener against Rochester, WJAR sports reporter Joe Rocco started a live report on the side of the field, while the game was in progress, for that day's 6 p.m. edition of "News Watch 10". Because the bright newscamera lights bothered some of the players, the home plate umpire went over and told Rocco that they were not going to hold up the game for a live news report. Rocco asked for 30 seconds to finish his report, but the umpire refused and called security to eject Rocco, forcing Rocco to end his live report.
- On July 3, 2001, PawSox player Israel "Izzy" Alcantara was hit by a pitch by Scranton/Wilkes-Barre Red Barons pitcher Blas Cedeño. Feeling that he had been thrown at, Alcantara responded by kicking catcher Jeremy Salazar in the chest and then charging the mound. The pitcher backed away, and after momentarily trying to get anyone on the Red Barons to fight, Alcantara was engulfed in the ensuing bench-clearing brawl. Alcantara was suspended for six games.
- On July 14, 2004, McCoy Stadium hosted the Triple-A All-Star Game between the International League and the Pacific Coast League. The IL won the game, 4–3 in 10 innings, before a crowd of 11,192.
- On April 26, 2006, during that season's minor league umpire strike, Durham Bulls player and Tampa Bay Devil Rays prospect Delmon Young threw a bat at a replacement umpire who had ejected him from the game. Young struck out on a called third strike, and stood at the plate (silently, according to PawSox catcher Corky Miller) before walking away. When the umpire signaled that he was ejected, Young responded by throwing his bat, end-over-end, at the umpire, who was hit in his chest protector with the bat. The International League suspended Young for 50 games for the incident.
- McCoy Stadium saw two perfect games thrown by PawSox pitchers. On June 1, 2000, Tomokazu Ohka defeated the Charlotte Knights 2–0, needing just 76 pitches to retire all 27 Charlotte batters. On August 10, 2003, Bronson Arroyo blanked the Buffalo Bisons by a score of 7–0. Arroyo was called up to the major-league Red Sox later that month.

== Attendance ==
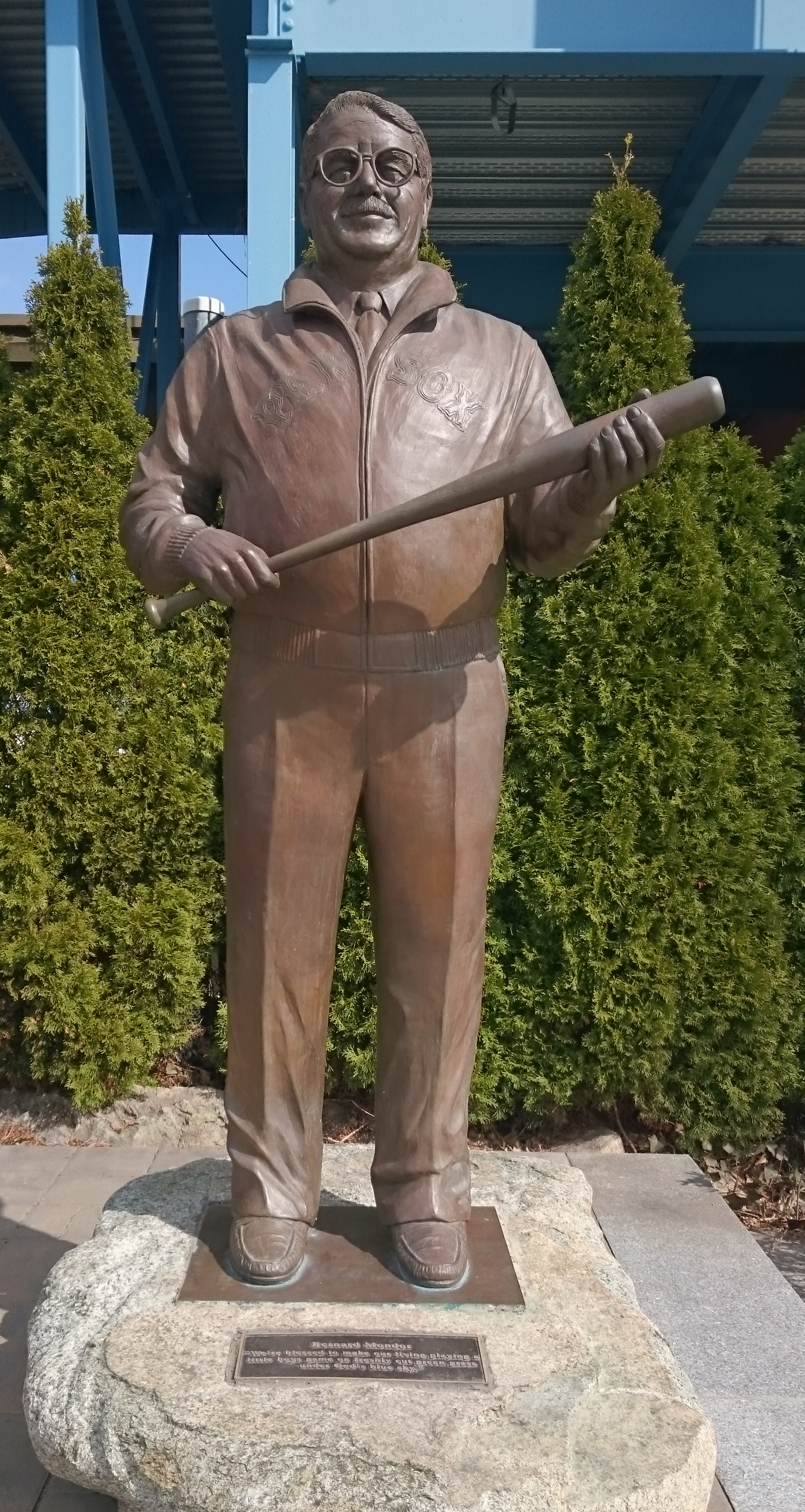
Statue of longtime owner Ben Mondor outside the stadium

When Ben Mondor bought control of the team in 1977, the PawSox drew only 70,354 fans (1,082 per game) to McCoy, which seated 5,800 people at the time. A few seats were added along the way, and during the mid-1990s, the park's capacity was listed as 7,002.

In 1999, the first season after the McCoy expansion, the PawSox averaged a paid attendance of 8,403 per game, and in 2000 it increased to 8,733. That figure represented 87% of every seat for every game being sold, where no other team in the league was above 70%. The club's top two attendance figures have come in 2004 and 2005, and with a paid attendance of 688,421, the '05 PawSox ranked fourth among all minor-league teams in any sport in North America. In New England, they ranked as the biggest draw of any sporting event except their parent club, the Red Sox at Fenway Park.

Going into the 2006 season, the top 88 single-game attendance figures had come in the prior seven seasons, following the expansion. The stadium's record crowd of 11,802 was set on September 5, 2004, for a late-season game against Scranton with the PawSox in playoff contention. The season finale the next day, at 11,067, ranked 13th. Prior to the expansion, the highest single-game attendance occurred on July 1, 1982, when 9,389 showed up for the pitching match-up of Mark Fidrych versus Dave Righetti.

== Other events ==
=== Political rally ===
On October 30, 1944, then Senator and Vice-Presidential candidate Harry S. Truman addressed a Democratic rally at the stadium, in support of re-electing President Franklin D. Roosevelt.

=== High school football ===
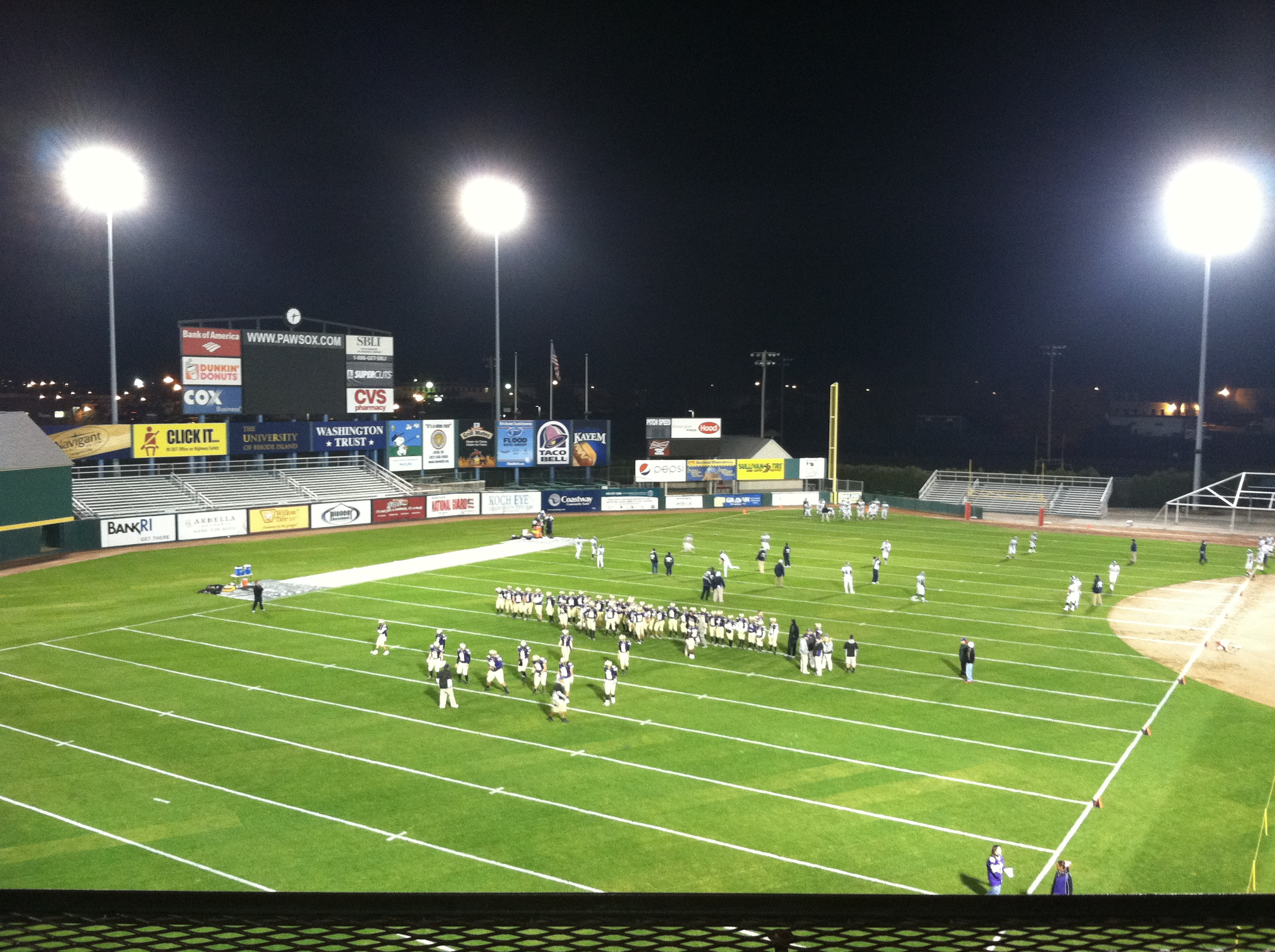
McCoy Stadium in a football configuration

Tolman High School and Saint Raphael Academy played their regular season games at the adjacent Pariseau Field (also known as the McCoy Annex). For 73 years, the two schools played a Thanksgiving game, with most of those games played inside McCoy Stadium. In the mid-1990s, the game moved from Thanksgiving morning to the night before. The holiday rivalry ended in 2001, but the games still continued. The schools alternated the use of the stadium, with Tolman hosting their new rival, the crosstown Shea High School, on the odd-number years, and Saint Raphael hosting Moses Brown School on the even-number years. After the closure of McCoy Stadium, Centreville Bank Stadium was selected to host a Thanksgiving rivalry game, following its opening in May 2025.

=== Concerts ===
For three years, McCoy Stadium hosted an annual concert during the summer. Bob Dylan was the first to perform at the stadium in 2006. Collective Soul, Live and Counting Crows performed in 2007. In 2008, Boston-based bands The Mighty Mighty Bosstones and Dropkick Murphys performed at McCoy as part of a three-stadium tour. The tour also included LeLacheur Park in Lowell, Massachusetts, and Hadlock Field in Portland, Maine. These stadiums have also been home to Boston Red Sox minor league teams, respectively the Lowell Spinners and, currently, Portland Sea Dogs.

=== Dining on the Diamond ===
After the cancellation of the 2020 minor league baseball season due to the COVID-19 pandemic, the PawSox developed a "Dining on the Diamond" program which served dinner to nearly 6,000 people on the baseball field from June through August, with a waiting list of more than 3,600 entering September.
