= 1972 Texas Rangers season =

1972 Texas Rangers
- League: American League
- Division: West
- Ballpark: Arlington Stadium
- City: Arlington, Texas
- Record: 54–100 (.351)
- Divisional place: 6th
- Owners: Bob Short
- General managers: Joe Burke
- Managers: Ted Williams
- Television: KDTV
- Radio: KRLD (Don Drysdale, Bill Mercer)

The 1972 Texas Rangers season was the 12th of the Texas Rangers franchise overall, their 1st in Arlington as the Rangers, the 1st season at Arlington Stadium and the team's first year in the AL West, after playing their first 11 seasons in Washington, D.C. The Rangers finished sixth in the American League West with a record of 54 wins and 100 losses. The Rangers had the lowest team batting average in the majors with .217, and failed to record an extra-base hit in 38 of their 154 games, the most of any team in the live-ball era (1920 onwards).

== Offseason ==
- December 2, 1971: Bernie Allen was traded by the Rangers to the New York Yankees for Terry Ley and Gary Jones.
- December 2, 1971: Del Unser, Gary Jones, Terry Ley, and Denny Riddleberger were traded by the Rangers to the Cleveland Indians for Roy Foster, Ken Suarez, Mike Paul, and Rich Hand.
- December 2, 1971: Paul Casanova was traded by the Rangers to the Atlanta Braves for Hal King.
- March 4, 1972: Denny McLain was traded by the Rangers to the Oakland Athletics for Jim Panther and Don Stanhouse.
- March 7, 1972: Tim Cullen was released by the Rangers.
- Prior to 1972 season: Lew Beasley was acquired by the Rangers from the Baltimore Orioles.

== Regular season ==
On April 15, 1972, the Rangers played their first American League game against the California Angels on the road at Anaheim Stadium. The Angels' Andy Messersmith hurled a complete-game, two-hit shutout, and the Rangers fell, 1–0. Toby Harrah and Hal King had their only hits, both singles, but catcher King made two errors. His second miscue led to the Angels' winning run in the bottom of the ninth inning. Dick Bosman was the hard-luck loser.

=== The first game in Texas ===
On April 21, 1972, the Rangers' first game in Texas came six days later at Arlington Stadium against the Angels before 20,105 spectators. This time, Bosman emerged triumphant as the Rangers built a 6–1 lead and hung on to win their home opener, 7–6. Frank Howard and Dave Nelson each homered for Texas, while Lenny Randle and Harrah each collected three hits. Harrah scored three runs, and Randle notched four runs batted in.

==== Opening Day starters, April 15, 1972 ====
| 2 | Lenny Randle | 2B |
| 1 | Dave Nelson | 3B |
| 5 | Don Mincher | 1B |
| 15 | Hal King | C |
| 33 | Frank Howard | LF |
| 4 | Larry Biittner | RF |
| 35 | Joe Lovitto | CF |
| 11 | Toby Harrah | SS |
| 27 | Dick Bosman | P |

=== Season standings ===
AL West
| Team | W | L | Pct. | GB | Home | Road |
|---|---|---|---|---|---|---|
| Oakland Athletics | 93 | 62 | .600 | — | 48‍–‍29 | 45‍–‍33 |
| Chicago White Sox | 87 | 67 | .565 | 5½ | 55‍–‍23 | 32‍–‍44 |
| Minnesota Twins | 77 | 77 | .500 | 15½ | 42‍–‍32 | 35‍–‍45 |
| Kansas City Royals | 76 | 78 | .494 | 16½ | 44‍–‍33 | 32‍–‍45 |
| California Angels | 75 | 80 | .484 | 18 | 44‍–‍36 | 31‍–‍44 |
| Texas Rangers | 54 | 100 | .351 | 38½ | 31‍–‍46 | 23‍–‍54 |

=== Record vs. opponents ===
1972 American League records Sources:
| Team | BAL | BOS | CAL | CWS | CLE | DET | KC | MIL | MIN | NYY | OAK | TEX |
|---|---|---|---|---|---|---|---|---|---|---|---|---|
| Baltimore | — | 7–11 | 6–6 | 8–4 | 8–10 | 10–8 | 6–6 | 10–5 | 6–6 | 7–6 | 6–6 | 6–6 |
| Boston | 11–7 | — | 8–4 | 6–6 | 8–7 | 5–9 | 6–6 | 11–7 | 4–8 | 9–9 | 9–3 | 8–4 |
| California | 6–6 | 4–8 | — | 7–11 | 8–4 | 5–7 | 9–6 | 7–5 | 7–8 | 4–8 | 8–10 | 10–7 |
| Chicago | 4–8 | 6–6 | 11–7 | — | 8–4 | 5–7 | 8–9 | 9–3 | 8–6 | 7–5 | 7–8 | 14–4 |
| Cleveland | 10–8 | 7–8 | 4–8 | 4–8 | — | 10–8 | 6–6 | 5–10 | 8–4 | 7–11 | 2–10 | 9–3 |
| Detroit | 8–10 | 9–5 | 7–5 | 7–5 | 8–10 | — | 7–5 | 10–8 | 9–3 | 7–9 | 4–8 | 10–2 |
| Kansas City | 6–6 | 6–6 | 6–9 | 9–8 | 6–6 | 5–7 | — | 7–5 | 9–9 | 7–5 | 7–11 | 8–6 |
| Milwaukee | 5–10 | 7–11 | 5–7 | 3–9 | 10–5 | 8–10 | 5–7 | — | 4–8 | 9–9 | 4–8 | 5–7 |
| Minnesota | 6–6 | 8–4 | 8–7 | 6–8 | 4–8 | 3–9 | 9–9 | 8–4 | — | 6–6 | 8–9 | 11–7 |
| New York | 6–7 | 9–9 | 8–4 | 5–7 | 11–7 | 9–7 | 5–7 | 9–9 | 6–6 | — | 3–9 | 8–4 |
| Oakland | 6–6 | 3–9 | 10–8 | 8–7 | 10–2 | 8–4 | 11–7 | 8–4 | 9–8 | 9–3 | — | 11–4 |
| Texas | 6–6 | 4–8 | 7–10 | 4–14 | 3–9 | 2–10 | 6–8 | 7–5 | 7–11 | 4–8 | 4–11 | — |

=== Notable transactions ===
- June 6, 1972: 1972 Major League Baseball draft
  - Brian Doyle was drafted by the Rangers in the 4th round.
  - Jim Sundberg was drafted by the Rangers in the 8th round, but did not sign.
- July 20, 1972: Don Mincher and Ted Kubiak were traded by the Rangers to the Oakland Athletics for Marty Martínez, Vic Harris and a player to be named later.
- August 31, 1972: Frank Howard was purchased from the Rangers by the Detroit Tigers.
- September 7, 1972: Rich Hinton was purchased by the Rangers from the New York Yankees.

=== Roster ===
1972 Texas Rangers
Roster
| Pitchers: 27 Dick Bosman; 18 Pete Broberg; 29 Casey Cox; 37 Jan Dukes; 13 Bill Gogolewski; 25 Rich Hand; 15 Rich Hinton; 19 Gerry Janeski; 24 Steve Lawson; 32 Paul Lindblad; 31 Jim Panther; 30 Mike Paul; 28 Horacio Piña; 34 Jim Roland; 16 Jim Shellenback; 17 Don Stanhouse | Catchers: 8 Dick Billings; 12 Bill Fahey; 15 Hal King; 12 Ken Suarez; Infielders: 4 Larry Biittner; 22 Jim Driscoll; 11 Toby Harrah; 7 Vic Harris; 33 Frank Howard; 14 Dalton Jones; 7 Ted Kubiak; 10 Marty Martínez; 2,14 Jim Mason; 5 Don Mincher; 1 Dave Nelson; 21 Tom Ragland; 2 Lenny Randle | Outfielders: 20 Jeff Burroughs; 3 Ted Ford; 6 Tom Grieve; 35 Joe Lovitto; 23 Elliott Maddox | Manager: 9 Ted Williams; Coaches: 40 Joe Camacho; 42 Nellie Fox; 41 Sid Hudson; 43 George Susce; 44 Wayne Terwilliger |

== Player stats ==
| = Indicates team leader |

=== Batting ===
==== Starters by position ====
Note: Pos = Position; G = Games played; AB = At bats; R = Runs scored; H = Hits; Avg. = Batting average; HR = Home runs; RBI = Runs batted in; SB = Stolen bases

| Pos | Player | G | AB | R | H | Avg. | HR | RBI | SB |
|---|---|---|---|---|---|---|---|---|---|
| C | Dick Billings | 133 | 469 | 41 | 119 | .254 | 5 | 58 | 1 |
| 1B | Frank Howard | 95 | 287 | 28 | 70 | .244 | 9 | 31 | 1 |
| 2B | Lenny Randle | 74 | 249 | 23 | 48 | .193 | 2 | 21 | 4 |
| 3B | Dave Nelson | 145 | 499 | 68 | 113 | .226 | 2 | 28 | 51 |
| SS | Toby Harrah | 116 | 374 | 47 | 97 | .259 | 1 | 31 | 16 |
| LF | Tom Grieve | 64 | 142 | 12 | 29 | .204 | 3 | 11 | 1 |
| CF | Joe Lovitto | 117 | 330 | 23 | 74 | .224 | 1 | 19 | 13 |
| RF | Ted Ford | 129 | 429 | 43 | 101 | .235 | 14 | 50 | 4 |

==== Other batters ====
Note: G = Games played; AB = At bats; R = Runs scored; H = Hits; Avg. = Batting average; HR = Home runs; RBI = Runs batted in; SB = Stolen bases

| Player | G | AB | R | H | Avg. | HR | RBI | SB |
|---|---|---|---|---|---|---|---|---|
| Larry Biittner | 137 | 382 | 34 | 99 | .259 | 3 | 31 | 1 |
| Elliott Maddox | 98 | 294 | 40 | 74 | .252 | 0 | 10 | 20 |
| Don Mincher | 61 | 191 | 23 | 45 | .236 | 6 | 39 | 2 |
| Vic Harris | 61 | 186 | 8 | 26 | .140 | 0 | 10 | 7 |
| Dalton Jones | 72 | 151 | 14 | 24 | .159 | 4 | 19 | 1 |
| Jim Mason | 46 | 147 | 10 | 29 | .197 | 0 | 10 | 0 |
| Hal King | 50 | 122 | 12 | 22 | .180 | 4 | 12 | 0 |
| Bill Fahey | 39 | 119 | 8 | 20 | .168 | 1 | 10 | 4 |
| Ted Kubiak | 46 | 116 | 5 | 26 | .224 | 0 | 7 | 0 |
| Jeff Burroughs | 22 | 65 | 4 | 12 | .185 | 1 | 3 | 0 |
| Tom Ragland | 25 | 58 | 3 | 10 | .172 | 0 | 2 | 0 |
| Marty Martínez | 26 | 41 | 3 | 6 | .146 | 0 | 3 | 0 |
| Ken Suarez | 25 | 33 | 2 | 5 | .152 | 0 | 4 | 0 |
| Jim Driscoll | 15 | 18 | 0 | 0 | .000 | 0 | 0 | 0 |

=== Pitching ===
==== Starting pitchers ====
Note: G = Games pitched; IP = Innings pitched; W = Wins; L = Losses; ERA = Earned run average; SO = Strikeouts

| Player | G | IP | W | L | ERA | SO |
|---|---|---|---|---|---|---|
| Dick Bosman | 29 | 173.1 | 8 | 10 | 3.63 | 105 |
| Rich Hand | 30 | 170.2 | 10 | 14 | 3.32 | 109 |
| Don Stanhouse | 24 | 104.2 | 2 | 9 | 3.78 | 78 |

==== Other pitchers ====
Note: G = Games pitched; IP = Innings pitched; W = Wins; L = Losses; ERA = Earned run average; SO = Strikeouts

| Player | G | IP | W | L | ERA | SO |
|---|---|---|---|---|---|---|
| Pete Broberg | 39 | 176.1 | 5 | 12 | 4.29 | 133 |
| Mike Paul | 49 | 161.2 | 8 | 9 | 2.17 | 108 |
| Bill Gogolewski | 36 | 150.2 | 4 | 11 | 4.24 | 95 |
| Jim Shellenback | 22 | 57.0 | 2 | 4 | 3.47 | 30 |
| Gerry Janeski | 4 | 12.2 | 0 | 1 | 2.84 | 7 |

==== Relief pitchers ====
Note: G = Games pitched; W = Wins; L = Losses; SV = Saves; ERA = Earned run average; SO = Strikeouts

| Player | G | W | L | SV | ERA | SO |
|---|---|---|---|---|---|---|
| Horacio Piña | 60 | 2 | 7 | 15 | 3.20 | 60 |
| Paul Lindblad | 66 | 5 | 8 | 9 | 2.62 | 51 |
| Jim Panther | 58 | 5 | 9 | 0 | 4.13 | 44 |
| Casey Cox | 35 | 3 | 5 | 4 | 4.41 | 27 |
| Steve Lawson | 13 | 0 | 0 | 1 | 2.81 | 13 |
| Rich Hinton | 5 | 0 | 1 | 0 | 2.38 | 4 |
| Jim Roland | 5 | 0 | 0 | 0 | 8.10 | 4 |
| Jan Dukes | 3 | 0 | 0 | 0 | 3.86 | 0 |

== Farm system ==
| Level | Team | League | Manager |
|---|---|---|---|
| AAA | Denver Bears | American Association | Del Wilber |
| AA | Pittsfield Senators | Eastern League | Joe Klein |
| A | Burlington Rangers | Carolina League | Frank Gable |
| A | Greenville Rangers | Western Carolinas League | Rich Donnelly |
| A-Short Season | Geneva Senators | New York–Penn League | Bill Haywood |
