= 1972 Cleveland Indians season =

1972 Cleveland Indians
- League: American League
- Division: East
- Ballpark: Cleveland Municipal Stadium
- City: Cleveland, Ohio
- Owner: Vernon Stouffer
- General manager: Gabe Paul
- Manager: Ken Aspromonte
- Television: WJW-TV
- Radio: WERE (1300)

The 1972 Cleveland Indians season was the 72nd season in franchise history. The Indians finished 5th place in the American League East Division. with a record of 72 wins and 84 losses, 14 games behind the Detroit Tigers.

== Offseason ==
=== George Steinbrenner offer ===
On December 6, 1971, George Steinbrenner led a group of investors (including Ted Bonda, Ed Jeffrey, Howard Metzenbaum, Steve O'Neill, Gabe Paul and Al Rosen) that negotiated with Jim Stouffer, the son of Indians owner Vernon Stouffer about the potential purchase of the franchise. The group offered $8.6 million and agreed to absorb $300,000 in debt (Stouffer borrowed against the Indians television contract for 1972). Although Steinbrenner and Jim Stouffer agreed to a sale, Vernon Stouffer disapproved of the deal. He felt that he was able of getting $10 million for the franchise.

=== Notable transactions ===
- November 29, 1971: Sam McDowell was traded by the Indians to the San Francisco Giants for Gaylord Perry and Frank Duffy.
- December 2, 1971: Roy Foster, Ken Suarez, Mike Paul, and Rich Hand were traded by the Indians to the Texas Rangers for Del Unser, Gary Jones, Terry Ley, and Denny Riddleberger.
- December 6, 1971: Adolfo Phillips was purchased by the Indians from the Montreal Expos.

== Regular season ==
=== Season standings ===
AL East
Team	W	L	Pct.	GB	Home	Road
Detroit Tigers	86	70	.551	—	44‍–‍34	42‍–‍36
Boston Red Sox	85	70	.548	½	52‍–‍26	33‍–‍44
Baltimore Orioles	80	74	.519	5	38‍–‍39	42‍–‍35
New York Yankees	79	76	.510	6½	46‍–‍31	33‍–‍45
Cleveland Indians	72	84	.462	14	43‍–‍34	29‍–‍50
Milwaukee Brewers	65	91	.417	21	37‍–‍42	28‍–‍49

=== Record vs. opponents ===
1972 American League records Sources:
Team	BAL	BOS	CAL	CWS	CLE	DET	KC	MIL	MIN	NYY	OAK	TEX
Baltimore	—	7–11	6–6	8–4	8–10	10–8	6–6	10–5	6–6	7–6	6–6	6–6
Boston	11–7	—	8–4	6–6	8–7	5–9	6–6	11–7	4–8	9–9	9–3	8–4
California	6–6	4–8	—	7–11	8–4	5–7	9–6	7–5	7–8	4–8	8–10	10–7
Chicago	4–8	6–6	11–7	—	8–4	5–7	8–9	9–3	8–6	7–5	7–8	14–4
Cleveland	10–8	7–8	4–8	4–8	—	10–8	6–6	5–10	8–4	7–11	2–10	9–3
Detroit	8–10	9–5	7–5	7–5	8–10	—	7–5	10–8	9–3	7–9	4–8	10–2
Kansas City	6–6	6–6	6–9	9–8	6–6	5–7	—	7–5	9–9	7–5	7–11	8–6
Milwaukee	5–10	7–11	5–7	3–9	10–5	8–10	5–7	—	4–8	9–9	4–8	5–7
Minnesota	6–6	8–4	8–7	6–8	4–8	3–9	9–9	8–4	—	6–6	8–9	11–7
New York	6–7	9–9	8–4	5–7	11–7	9–7	5–7	9–9	6–6	—	3–9	8–4
Oakland	6–6	3–9	10–8	8–7	10–2	8–4	11–7	8–4	9–8	9–3	—	11–4
Texas	6–6	4–8	7–10	4–14	3–9	2–10	6–8	7–5	7–11	4–8	4–11	—

=== Notable transactions ===
- June 6, 1972: 1972 Major League Baseball draft
  - Rick Manning was drafted by the Indians in the 1st round (2nd pick).
  - Dennis Eckersley was drafted by the Indians in the 3rd round. Player signed June 12, 1972.
  - Rick Langford was drafted by the Indians in the 36th round, but did not sign.
- September 18, 1972: Lowell Palmer was selected off waivers by the Indians from the St. Louis Cardinals.

=== Opening Day Lineup ===
Opening Day Starters
#	Name	Position
1	Del Unser	CF
11	Eddie Leon	2B
20	Alex Johnson	LF
12	Graig Nettles	3B
14	Chris Chambliss	1B
8	Ray Fosse	C
9	Buddy Bell	RF
15	Frank Duffy	SS
36	Gaylord Perry	P

=== Roster ===
1972 Cleveland Indians
Roster
Pitchers: 35 Bill Butler; 44 Vince Colbert; 46 Steve Dunning; 47 Ed Farmer; 34 Steve Hargan; 38 Phil Hennigan; 40 Tom Hilgendorf; 42 Mike Kilkenny; 30 Ray Lamb; 43 Marcelino López; 31 Steve Mingori; 33 Lowell Palmer; 36 Gaylord Perry; 37 Denny Riddleberger; 41 Dick Tidrow; 32 Milt Wilcox	Catchers: 8 Ray Fosse; 52 Larry Johnson; 10 Jerry Moses; Infielders: 7 Jack Brohamer; 17 Lou Camilli; 14 Chris Chambliss; 15 Frank Duffy; 18 Jack Heidemann; 11 Eddie Leon; 12 Graig Nettles; 16 Fred Stanley	Outfielders: 9 Buddy Bell; 25 Kurt Bevacqua; 27 Roy Foster; 20 Alex Johnson; 23 Ron Lolich; 29 John Lowenstein; 22 Tommy McCraw; 28 Adolfo Phillips; 1 Del Unser	Manager: 2 Ken Aspromonte; Coaches: -- Clay Bryant; 6 Bobby Hofman (Third Base); 3 Joe Lutz (First Base); 21 Warren Spahn (Pitching)

== Player stats ==
=== Batting ===
Note: G = Games played; AB = At bats; R = Runs scored; H = Hits; 2B = Doubles; 3B = Triples; HR = Home runs; RBI = Runs batted in; AVG = Batting average; SB = Stolen bases

Player	G	AB	R	H	2B	3B	HR	RBI	AVG	SB
Buddy Bell	132	466	49	119	21	1	9	36	.255	5
Kurt Bevacqua	19	35	2	4	0	0	1	1	.114	0
Jack Brohamer	136	527	49	123	13	2	5	35	.233	3
Bill Butler	6	1	0	0	0	0	0	0	.000	0
Lou Camilli	39	41	2	6	2	0	0	3	.146	0
Chris Chambliss	121	466	51	136	27	2	6	44	.292	3
Vince Colbert	23	20	1	4	1	0	0	0	.200	0
Frank Duffy	130	385	23	92	16	4	3	27	.239	6
Steve Dunning	20	33	6	9	1	0	3	4	.273	0
Ed Farmer	46	7	0	1	0	0	0	0	,143	0
Ray Fosse	134	457	42	110	20	1	10	41	.241	5
Roy Foster	73	143	19	32	4	0	4	13	.224	0
Steve Hargan	12	3	0	0	0	0	0	0	.000	0
Jack Heidemann	10	20	0	3	0	0	0	0	.150	0
Phil Hennigan	38	12	1	1	0	0	0	0	.083	0
Tom Hilgendorf	19	13	0	1	0	0	0	1	.077	0
Alex Johnson	108	356	31	85	10	1	8	37	.239	6
Larry Johnson	1	2	0	1	0	0	0	0	.500	0
Mike Kilkenny	22	14	0	1	0	0	0	0	.071	0
Ray Lamb	34	21	0	0	0	0	0	0	.000	0
Eddie Leon	89	225	14	45	2	1	4	16	.200	0
Ron Lolich	24	80	4	15	1	0	2	8	.188	0
Marcelino López	4	1	0	0	0	0	0	0	.000	0
John Lowenstein	68	151	16	32	8	1	6	21	.212	2
Tommy McCraw	129	391	43	101	12	5	7	33	,258	12
Steve Mingori	42	8	0	1	0	0	0	0	.125	0
Jerry Moses	52	141	9	31	3	0	4	14	,220	0
Graig Nettles	150	557	65	141	28	0	17	70	.253	2
Lowell Palmer	1	0	0	0	0	0	0	0	—	0
Gaylord Perry	41	110	5	17	2	0	1	9	.155	0
Adolfo Phillips	12	7	2	0	0	0	0	0	.000	0
Denny Riddleberger	38	4	0	0	0	0	0	0	.000	0
Fred Stanley	6	12	1	2	1	0	0	0	.167	0
Dick Tidrow	39	70	5	7	0	0	0	6	.100	0
Del Unser	132	383	29	91	12	0	1	17	.238	5
Milt Wilcox	32	45	3	9	2	0	0	4	.200	0
Team totals	156	5207	472	1220	186	18	91	440	.234	49

=== Pitching ===
Note: W = Wins; L = Losses; ERA = Earned run average; G = Games pitched; GS = Games started; SV = Saves; IP = Innings pitched; H = Hits allowed; R = Runs allowed; ER = Earned runs allowed; BB = Walks allowed; K = Strikeouts

Player	W	L	ERA	G	GS	SV	IP	H	R	ER	BB	K
Bill Butler	0	0	1.54	6	2	0	11.2	9	3	2	10	6
Vince Colbert	1	7	4.58	22	11	0	74.2	74	42	38	38	36
Steve Dunning	6	4	3.26	16	16	0	105.0	98	39	38	43	52
Ed Farmer	2	5	4.40	46	1	7	61.1	51	32	30	27	33
Steve Hargan	0	3	5.85	12	1	0	20.0	23	16	13	15	10
Phil Hennigan	5	3	2.67	38	1	6	67.1	54	20	20	18	44
Tom Hilgendorf	3	1	2.68	19	5	0	47.0	51	16	14	21	25
Mike Kilkenny	4	1	3.41	22	7	1	58.0	51	23	22	39	44
Ray Lamb	5	6	3.09	34	9	0	107.2	101	42	37	29	64
Marcelino López	0	0	5.40	4	2	0	8.1	8	5	5	10	1
Steve Mingori	0	6	3.95	41	0	10	57.0	67	28	25	36	47
Lowell Palmer	0	0	4.50	1	0	0	2.0	2	1	1	2	3
Gaylord Perry	24	16	1.92	41	40	1	342.2	253	79	73	82	234
Denny Riddleberger	1	3	2.50	38	0	0	54.0	45	23	15	22	34
Dick Tidrow	14	15	2.77	39	34	0	237.1	200	83	73	70	123
Milt Wilcox	7	14	3.40	32	27	0	156.0	145	67	59	72	90
Team totals	72	84	2.92	156	156	25	1410.0	1232	519	457	534	846

== Awards and honors ==
All-Star Game

- Gaylord Perry, pitcher, reserve

== Farm system ==
Level	Team	League	Manager
AAA	Portland Beavers	Pacific Coast League	Ray Hathaway, Clay Bryant and Dan Carnevale
AA	Elmira Pioneers	Eastern League	Len Johnston
A	Reno Silver Sox	California League	Lou Klimchock
Rookie	GCL Indians	Gulf Coast League	Pinky May
