= 1972 New York Yankees season =

Season for the Major League Baseball team the New York Yankees

1972 New York Yankees
- League: American League
- Division: East
- Ballpark: Yankee Stadium
- City: New York City
- Record: 79-76 (.510)
- Owners: CBS
- General managers: Lee MacPhail
- Managers: Ralph Houk
- Television: WPIX (Phil Rizzuto, Frank Messer, Bill White)
- Radio: WMCA (Frank Messer, Phil Rizzuto, Bill White)

The 1972 New York Yankees season was the 70th season for the Yankees. The team finished with a record of 79–76, finishing 6 1/2 games behind the Detroit Tigers. New York was managed by Ralph Houk. The Yankees played at Yankee Stadium.

== Offseason ==
- October 13, 1971: Jim Lyttle was traded by the Yankees to the Chicago White Sox for Rich Hinton.
- December 2, 1971: Stan Bahnsen was traded by the Yankees to the Chicago White Sox for Rich McKinney.
- December 2, 1971: Terry Ley and Gary Jones were traded by the Yankees to the Texas Rangers for Bernie Allen.
- January 20, 1972: The Yankees traded a player to be named later to the Chicago Cubs for Johnny Callison. The Yankees completed the deal by sending Jack Aker to the Cubs on May 17.
- February 2, 1972: Hal Lanier was purchased by the Yankees from the San Francisco Giants.
- March 22, 1972: Danny Cater and a player to be named later were traded by the Yankees to the Boston Red Sox for Sparky Lyle. The Yankees completed the deal by sending Mario Guerrero to the Red Sox on June 30.
- March 31, 1972: Frank Tepedino was purchased by the Yankees from the Milwaukee Brewers.

== Regular season ==
Yogi Berra's number 8 was retired by the New York Yankees in 1972.

Bill Dickey's number 8 was retired by the New York Yankees in 1972.

- Felipe Alou achieved two milestones in 1972. He got the 2,000th hit of his career and hit his 200th home run of his career.
- Mickey Mantle and Joe DiMaggio were at Yankee Stadium for Old-Timers' Day on July 22, 1972. The event at the stadium brought together some of the greatest living Yankees and included an exhibition game featuring retired players.

=== Season standings ===
AL East
Team	W	L	Pct.	GB	Home	Road
Detroit Tigers	86	70	.551	—	44‍–‍34	42‍–‍36
Boston Red Sox	85	70	.548	½	52‍–‍26	33‍–‍44
Baltimore Orioles	80	74	.519	5	38‍–‍39	42‍–‍35
New York Yankees	79	76	.510	6½	46‍–‍31	33‍–‍45
Cleveland Indians	72	84	.462	14	43‍–‍34	29‍–‍50
Milwaukee Brewers	65	91	.417	21	37‍–‍42	28‍–‍49

=== Record vs. opponents ===
1972 American League records Sources:
Team	BAL	BOS	CAL	CWS	CLE	DET	KC	MIL	MIN	NYY	OAK	TEX
Baltimore	—	7–11	6–6	8–4	8–10	10–8	6–6	10–5	6–6	7–6	6–6	6–6
Boston	11–7	—	8–4	6–6	8–7	5–9	6–6	11–7	4–8	9–9	9–3	8–4
California	6–6	4–8	—	7–11	8–4	5–7	9–6	7–5	7–8	4–8	8–10	10–7
Chicago	4–8	6–6	11–7	—	8–4	5–7	8–9	9–3	8–6	7–5	7–8	14–4
Cleveland	10–8	7–8	4–8	4–8	—	10–8	6–6	5–10	8–4	7–11	2–10	9–3
Detroit	8–10	9–5	7–5	7–5	8–10	—	7–5	10–8	9–3	7–9	4–8	10–2
Kansas City	6–6	6–6	6–9	9–8	6–6	5–7	—	7–5	9–9	7–5	7–11	8–6
Milwaukee	5–10	7–11	5–7	3–9	10–5	8–10	5–7	—	4–8	9–9	4–8	5–7
Minnesota	6–6	8–4	8–7	6–8	4–8	3–9	9–9	8–4	—	6–6	8–9	11–7
New York	6–7	9–9	8–4	5–7	11–7	9–7	5–7	9–9	6–6	—	3–9	8–4
Oakland	6–6	3–9	10–8	8–7	10–2	8–4	11–7	8–4	9–8	9–3	—	11–4
Texas	6–6	4–8	7–10	4–14	3–9	2–10	6–8	7–5	7–11	4–8	4–11	—

=== Notable transactions ===
- June 6, 1972: 1972 Major League Baseball draft
  - Mickey Klutts was drafted by the Yankees in the 4th round.
  - Bob Kammeyer was drafted by the Yankees in the 21st round.
- September 7, 1972: Rich Hinton was purchased from the Yankees by the Texas Rangers.

=== Roster ===
1972 New York Yankees
Roster
Pitchers: 22 Jack Aker; 47 Fred Beene; 29 Wade Blasingame; 54 Steve Blateric; 50 Al Closter; 39 Casey Cox; 43 Rob Gardner; 45 Larry Gowell; 45 Rich Hinton; 18 Mike Kekich; 22 Ron Klimkowski; 38 Steve Kline; 28 Sparky Lyle; 40 Lindy McDaniel; 50 Doc Medich; 19 Fritz Peterson; 54 Jim Roland; 30 Mel Stottlemyre	Catchers: 23 John Ellis; 15 Thurman Munson; Infielders: 11 Bernie Allen; 24 Felipe Alou; 12 Ron Blomberg; 20 Horace Clarke; 2 Jerry Kenney; 36 Hal Lanier; 27 Rich McKinney; 17 Gene Michael; 10 Celerino Sánchez	Outfielders: 25 Johnny Callison; 1 Bobby Murcer; 42 Charlie Spikes; 14 Ron Swoboda; 21 Rusty Torres; 6 Roy White; Other batters: 41 Frank Tepedino	Manager: 35 Ralph Houk; Coaches: 44 Jim Hegan; 32 Elston Howard; 34 Dick Howser; 31 Jim Turner

== Player stats ==
= Indicates team leader

= Indicates league leader

=== Batting ===
==== Starters by position ====
Note: Pos = Position; G = Games played; AB = At bats; H = Hits; Avg. = Batting average; HR = Home runs; RBI = Runs batted in

Pos	Player	G	AB	H	Avg.	HR	RBI
C	Thurman Munson	140	511	143	.280	7	46
1B	Ron Blomberg	107	299	80	.268	14	49
2B	Horace Clarke	147	547	132	.241	3	37
3B	Celerino Sanchez	71	250	62	.248	0	22
SS	Gene Michael	126	391	91	.233	1	32
LF	Roy White	155	556	150	.270	10	54
CF	Bobby Murcer	153	585	171	.292	33	96
RF	Johnny Callison	95	275	71	.258	9	34

==== Other batters ====
Note: G = Games played; AB = At bats; H = Hits; Avg. = Batting average; HR = Home runs; RBI = Runs batted in

Player	G	AB	H	Avg.	HR	RBI
Felipe Alou	120	324	90	.278	6	37
Bernie Allen	84	220	50	.227	9	21
Rusty Torres	80	199	42	.211	3	13
John Ellis	52	136	40	.294	5	25
Rich McKinney	37	121	26	.215	1	7
Jerry Kenney	50	119	25	.210	0	7
Ron Swoboda	63	113	28	.248	1	12
Hal Lanier	60	103	22	.214	0	6
Charlie Spikes	14	34	5	.147	0	3
Frank Tepedino	8	8	0	.000	0	0

=== Pitching ===
==== Starting pitchers ====
Note: G = Games pitched; IP = Innings pitched; W = Wins; L = Losses; ERA = Earned run average; SO = Strikeouts

Player	G	IP	W	L	ERA	SO
Mel Stottlemyre	36	260.0	14	18	3.22	110
Fritz Peterson	35	250.1	17	15	3.24	100
Steve Kline	32	236.1	16	9	2.40	58
Mike Kekich	29	175.1	10	13	3.70	78
Rob Gardner	20	97.0	8	5	3.06	58

==== Other pitchers ====
Note: G = Games pitched; IP = Innings pitched; W = Wins; L = Losses; ERA = Earned run average; SO = Strikeouts

Player	G	IP	W	L	ERA	SO
Rich Hinton	7	16.2	1	0	4.86	13
Casey Cox	5	11.2	0	1	4.63	4
Larry Gowell	2	7.0	0	1	1.29	7
Doc Medich	1	0.0	0	0	inf	0

==== Relief pitchers ====
Note: G = Games pitched; W = Wins; L = Losses; SV = Saves; ERA = Earned run average; SO = Strikeouts

Player	G	W	L	SV	ERA	SO
Sparky Lyle	59	9	5	35	1.92	75
Lindy McDaniel	37	3	1	0	2.25	47
Fred Beene	29	1	3	3	2.34	37
Ron Klimkowski	16	0	3	1	4.02	11
Jim Roland	16	0	1	0	5.04	13
Wade Blasingame	12	0	1	0	4.24	7
Jack Aker	4	0	0	0	3.00	1
Al Closter	2	0	0	0	11.57	2
Steve Blateric	1	0	0	0	0.00	4

== Awards and honors ==
=== League leaders ===
- Sparky Lyle, American League leader, Saves (35)
- Bobby Murcer, American League leader, Runs (102)

== Farm system ==
Level	Team	League	Manager
AAA	Syracuse Chiefs	International League	Frank Verdi
AA	West Haven Yankees	Eastern League	Bobby Cox
A	Kinston Eagles	Carolina League	Gene Hassell
A	Fort Lauderdale Yankees	Florida State League	Pete Ward
A-Short Season	Oneonta Yankees	New York–Penn League	George Case
Rookie	Johnson City Yankees	Appalachian League	Jerry Walker

LEAGUE CHAMPIONS: West Haven
