= Bumpits =

Hair styling product

Bumpits, also stylized as Bump It! and BumpIt, is a plastic arc-shaped wedge used to create a pouffy, voluminous hairstyle which was popular around 2010. The product was advertised in informercials.

== History ==
Before the introduction of Bumpits, 1960s figures like Diana Ross, Priscilla Presley, and Jackie Kennedy sported the hairstyle by teasing with a comb.

=== Development ===
The product called Bumpits was invented in 2008 by Kelly Fitzpatrick-Bennett, a mother of two from Kingsburg, California, who had worked as a hairdresser from 1994 to 2001 and left due to a hand injury. She opened a mortgage business in Fresno and continued to attend hair conferences. She became inspired to develop Bumpits while watching The Big Idea with Donny Deutsch.

She used her savings to develop about 50 prototypes, one of which used kitchen knives and Velcro. She worked with a nearby injection molding company Jet Mold to ensure the product was shaped in a way that kept the hair in place. The product finished, she applied for a patent. There are three different sizes, depending on how large of a "bump" is wanted. In 2008, she traveled to trade shows in New York, Miami, and Chicago with her 20-year-old daughter and found an "overwhelming" demand for the product. In the spring of 2008, she founded a company called Big Happie Hair and hired employees, including her daughter and son. The company had an office and warehouse in Fresno. "Can you believe that something so simple didn't exist?" she told the Hanford Sentinel in 2008. In 2010, Big Happie Hair donated 2200 Bumpits to Selma High School in California.

=== Culture ===
Amidst the economic recession, hair-care sales declined overall despite the popularity of Bumpits. The product and its corresponding hairstyle were associated with Snooki and Hillary Clinton and were popular in rural areas, including areas of Idaho and New Jersey. Stephanie Kocielski, artistic director of John Paul Mitchell Systems, said to The New York Times, "The bigger the hair ... the closer to God."

Bumpits came in blonde, medium blonde, brunette, and black. Its instruction manual features seven different hairstyles. In 2009, a package of three cost ten dollars. To insert the Bumpits, a wearer pulls up the front section of the hair, tucks the Bumpits underneath, and then evenly distributes hair across the Bumpits' plastic teeth. The hairstyle can hide thinning hair.

In 2022 and 2023, as Y2K fashion is revived, celebrities have worn Bumpits.
