= Steve Lawson (baseball) =

American baseball player

- Pitcher
- Born: December 28, 1950 (age 75); Oakland, California, U.S.
- Batted: Right Threw: Left

MLB debut
- August 3, 1972, for the Texas Rangers

Last MLB appearance
- October 4, 1972, for the Texas Rangers

MLB statistics
- Win–loss record: 0–0
- Earned run average: 2.81
- Strikeouts: 13
- Stats at Baseball Reference

Teams
- Texas Rangers (1972)

Steven George Lawson (born December 28, 1950) is an American former Major League Baseball pitcher who appeared in 13 games for the Texas Rangers during the 1972 Texas Rangers season. After spending the 1973 and 1974 seasons with the Spokane Indians of the Pacific Coast League, he retired from baseball.

A single in his only at-bat left Lawson with a rare MLB career batting average of 1.000.
