= Ken Suarez =

American baseball player (1943–2023)

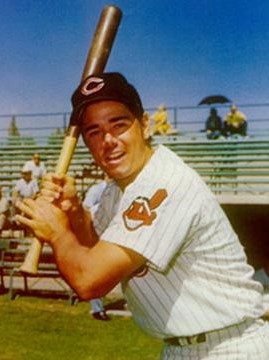
- Catcher
- Born: April 12, 1943; Tampa, Florida, U.S.
- Died: July 29, 2023 (aged 80); Fort Worth, Texas, U.S.
- Batted: Right Threw: Right

MLB debut
- April 12, 1966, for the Kansas City Athletics

Last MLB appearance
- September 22, 1973, for the Texas Rangers

MLB statistics
- Batting average: .227
- Home runs: 5
- Runs batted in: 60
- Stats at Baseball Reference

Teams
- Kansas City Athletics (1966–1967); Cleveland Indians (1968–1969, 1971); Texas Rangers (1972–1973)

Career highlights and awards
- First-team All-America (1964); FSU Hall of Fame (2005)

Kenneth Raymond Suarez (April 12, 1943 – July 29, 2023) was an American professional baseball player. He played as a catcher in Major League Baseball (MLB) for the Kansas City Athletics, Cleveland Indians, and Texas Rangers from 1966 to 1973.

After his All-American college baseball career with Florida State University, Suarez signed with the Athletics. He later played for the Indians and the Rangers. When he attempted to negotiate a raise with the Rangers, he filed for salary arbitration. The Rangers traded him and he retired.

== Early life ==
Kenneth Raymond Suarez was born in Tampa, Florida on April 12, 1943. He attended Jesuit High School. As well as being the catcher for the Jesuit Tigers, Suarez played for West Tampa's American Legion team with Lou Piniella and Tony La Russa.

Suarez attended Florida State University, and took over catching duties for the Seminoles baseball team as a sophomore in 1963. After leading his team to the College World Series in 1963, Suarez erupted his junior year. He batted .404 with 44 hits, six home runs, thirty runs batted in, 25 runs scored and 21 walks, all tops on his team. He was named a 1964 First Team All-American by the American Baseball Coaches Association. He represented the United States in baseball at the 1964 Summer Olympics as a demonstration sport in Tokyo.

== Baseball career ==
=== Kansas City Athletics ===
Suarez then signed with the Kansas City Athletics as an amateur free agent. Suarez's first professional hit was a grand slam while playing for the Lewiston Broncs in 1965. That season, he batted .253 with thirteen home runs and twenty RBIs while providing excellent defense for the Broncs and Double-A Birmingham Barons.

The Athletics invited Suarez to spring training in 1966. He won the starting job out of camp, but lost the job to Phil Roof after batting .185 with two RBIs through May. He remained in the major leagues through the All-Star break before being optioned to the Double-A Mobile A's.

An injury to Roof early in the 1967 season resulted in Suarez again becoming the starting catcher. He hit his first major league home run in his first start of the season against Mickey Lolich of the Detroit Tigers. He batted .235 with two home runs and four RBI in eight games filling in for Roof. Once Roof returned, Suarez remained with the club as a back-up catcher. After the season, he was drafted by the Cleveland Indians in the 1967 Rule 5 draft. Alvin Dark, who had been his manager with Kansas City, was now the Indians' manager and wanted the player on his new team.

=== Cleveland Indians ===
Suarez did not receive much playing time in Cleveland, appearing in only seventeen games in 1968, two of which were out of his natural position in extra inning affairs. He had just one hit in ten at-bats. He split 1969 between the Indians and the Pacific Coast League Portland Beavers, batting .294 with nine RBIs in 85 major league at-bats. He spent all of 1970 in the minors with the Wichita Aeros, and batted .301, marking the only time he batted over .300 in his professional career. Given a more regular role in 1971, Suarez appeared in 50 games for the Indians, hitting only .203 in 123 at-bats.

=== Texas Rangers ===
The Indians traded Suarez with Roy Foster, Rich Hand, and Mike Paul to the Texas Rangers for Del Unser, Denny Riddleberger, Terry Ley, and Gary Jones at the Winter Meetings on December 2, 1971. He spent most of his first season with the Rangers as the third string catcher before being reassigned to the Double-A Denver Bears. He platooned with Dick Billings behind the plate in 1973, and produced a .248 batting average while establishing himself as one of the better fielding catchers in the American League. He broke up a Jim Palmer perfect game attempt with a one-out single to left field in the ninth inning of a 9–1 away loss to the Baltimore Orioles on 16 June.

Suarez earned $20,000 in 1973 for the Rangers, and felt he was due for a raise. On February 7, 1974, he met with Rangers general manager Dan O'Brien Sr. to negotiate a new contract. Failing to reach an agreement, he became the first player on the team to submit a contract to arbitration. Five days later, he was traded back to the Cleveland Indians for shortstop Leo Cárdenas. Suarez chose to retire instead of go to camp with the Indians.

The Indians traded Suarez on September 12, 1974, to the California Angels with Rusty Torres for Frank Robinson.

== Personal life and death ==
After baseball, Suarez and his wife stayed in Fort Worth, Texas. He worked in various fields, including aviation and radio. Ken Suarez died on July 29, 2023, at the age of 80.
