= Lloyd Allen =

American baseball player (born 1950)

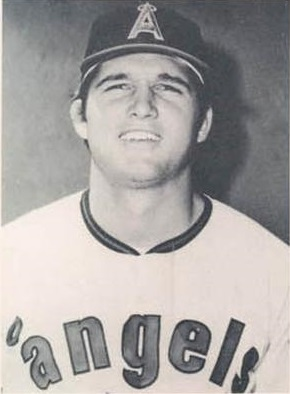
- Pitcher
- Born: May 8, 1950 (age 76); Merced, California, U.S.
- Batted: Right Threw: Right

MLB debut
- September 1, 1969, for the California Angels

Last MLB appearance
- July 27, 1975, for the Chicago White Sox

MLB statistics
- Win–loss record: 8–25
- Earned run average: 4.69
- Strikeouts: 194
- Stats at Baseball Reference

Teams
- California Angels (1969–1973); Texas Rangers (1973–1974); Chicago White Sox (1974–1975)

Lloyd Cecil Allen (born May 8, 1950) is an American former professional baseball pitcher, who played in Major League Baseball (MLB) for the California Angels (1969-1973), Texas Rangers (1973-1974), and Chicago White Sox (1974-1975). He was the first big league player born in the 1950s to appear in a regular-season game.

== Early life ==
Allen was born in Merced, California. He is Jewish, having converted to Judaism. He attended Selma High School in Selma, California and Fresno City College.

== Baseball career ==
Allen was selected by the California Angels with its first round (12th overall pick) of the 1968 amateur draft.

In 1969, Allen was the youngest player in the American League (AL). In 1971, his 15 saves ranked seventh in the AL. He was traded along with Jim Spencer from the Angels to the Texas Rangers for Mike Epstein, Rich Hand and Rick Stelmaszek on May 20, 1973. Arm problems led to him retiring from baseball, in 1979.

In seven MLB seasons, Allen had an 8–25 win–loss record, in 159 games, with 19 games started, 22 saves, 297 1/3 innings pitched, 291 hits allowed, 183 runs allowed, 155 earned runs allowed, 19 home runs allowed, 196 walks, 194 strikeouts, 11 hit batsmen, 27 wild pitches, 18 intentional walks, and a 4.69 earned run average (ERA).
