= Gene Clines =

American baseball player (1946–2022)

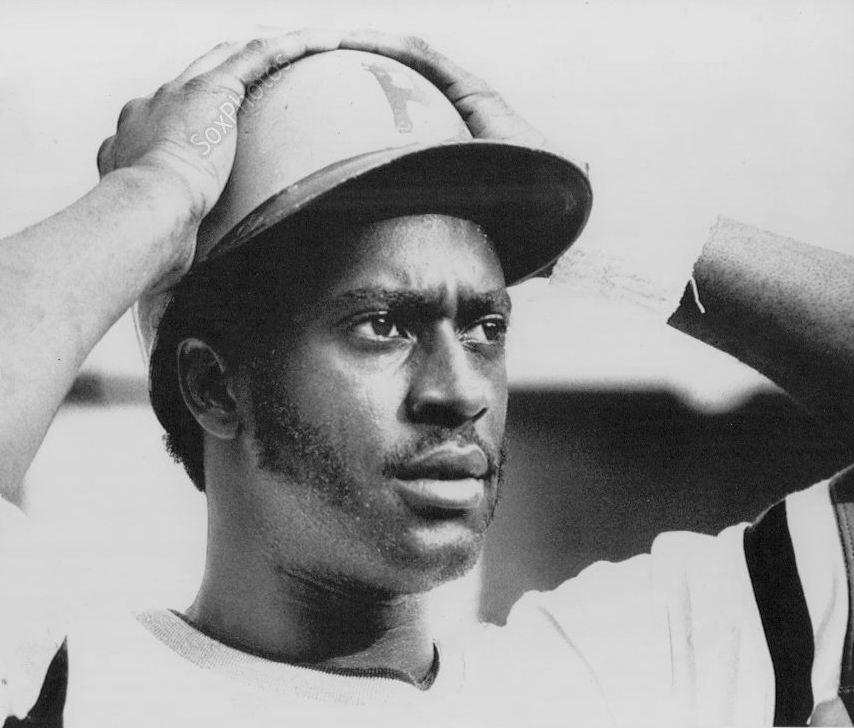
- Clines in 1972
- Outfielder
- Born: October 6, 1946; San Pablo, California, U.S.
- Died: January 27, 2022 (aged 75); Bradenton, Florida, U.S.
- Batted: Right Threw: Right

MLB debut
- June 28, 1970, for the Pittsburgh Pirates

Last MLB appearance
- May 8, 1979, for the Chicago Cubs

MLB statistics
- Batting average: .277
- Home runs: 5
- Runs batted in: 187
- Stats at Baseball Reference

Teams
- As player: Pittsburgh Pirates (1970–1974); New York Mets (1975); Texas Rangers (1976); Chicago Cubs (1977–1979); As coach: Chicago Cubs (1979–1981); Houston Astros (1988); Seattle Mariners (1989–1992); Milwaukee Brewers (1993–1994); San Francisco Giants (1997–2002); Chicago Cubs (2003–2006)

Career highlights and awards
- World Series champion (1971)

Eugene Anthony Clines (October 6, 1946 – January 27, 2022) was an American professional baseball player and coach. He played in Major League Baseball (MLB) as an outfielder from 1970 to 1979, most prominently as a member of the Pittsburgh Pirates teams that won four National League Eastern Division titles in five seasons between 1970 and 1974, and won the World Series in 1971. He also played for the New York Mets, Texas Rangers, and Chicago Cubs. He batted and threw right-handed.

After his playing career, Clines served as a coach for various clubs, including the Cubs, Houston Astros, Seattle Mariners, Milwaukee Brewers, and San Francisco Giants, and as an advisor with the Los Angeles Dodgers later in his career.

== Playing career ==
Clines attended Harry Ells High School in Richmond, California. The Pittsburgh Pirates selected Clines in the sixth round of the 1966 MLB draft.

A fast runner with excellent defensive skills, Clines debuted in 1970 with the Pirates as a reserve outfielder, hitting .405 (15-for-37) in 31 games in his rookie year. On September 1, 1971, Clines played in MLB's first-ever all-minority batting lineup.

Clines went to the postseason with Pittsburgh in the 1971, 1972, and 1974 National League Championship Series, winning a World Series ring with the Pirates in 1971. His most productive season came in 1972, when he posted career-highs in average (.334), doubles (15), and triples (6) in 107 games.

Clines was traded from the Pirates to the New York Mets for Duffy Dyer on October 22, 1974. After the 1975 season, the Mets traded him to the Texas Rangers for Joe Lovitto. Before the 1977 season, the Rangers sent Clines to the Chicago Cubs as the player to be named later in the earlier trade for Darold Knowles. The Cubs released Clines in May 1979. He batted .277 in 10 MLB seasons.

== Coaching career ==
Clines remained with the Cubs as a coach. He stayed on Chicago's coaching staff until 1981 and then joined the Houston Astros organization as a roving minor league hitting instructor, a position he held through 1987. Later, he worked as a hitting coach for Houston in 1988. The Seattle Mariners hired Clines as their hitting coach before the 1989 season. He spent four seasons as a hitting coach for the Mariners and was fired after the 1992 season. He was the hitting coach for the Milwaukee Brewers in 1993 and 1994 before joining the San Francisco Giants as a minor league hitting coordinator. After the 1996 season, the Giants promoted him to be their major league hitting coach.

After the 2002 season, Giants' manager Dusty Baker was hired to manage the Cubs. Baker brought Clines to Chicago with him as his first base coach. He was named hitting coach prior to the 2005 season. Baker was fired after the 2006 season, and his coaching staff was dismissed with him.

The Los Angeles Dodgers hired Clines as their roving outfield and base-running instructor in October 2006; he convinced Juan Pierre to sign with the Dodgers the next month. After the 2011 season, he was promoted to senior advisor for player development with the Dodgers.

== Personal life ==
Clines had a daughter from his high school sweetheart, LuWanda Brown, and two children by his ex-wife, Fay, and two children with his wife, Joanne. Clines died at his residence in Bradenton, Florida, on January 27, 2022, at the age of 75.

Sporting positions
Preceded by Denis Menke	Houston Astros hitting coach 1988	Succeeded by Yogi Berra
Preceded by Frank Howard	Seattle Mariners hitting coach 1989–1992	Succeeded by Ken Griffey Sr.
Preceded by Mike Easler	Milwaukee Brewers hitting coach 1993–1994	Succeeded by Lamar Johnson
Preceded by Bobby Bonds	San Francisco Giants hitting coach 1997–2002	Succeeded by Joe Lefebvre
Preceded by Sandy Alomar Sr.	Chicago Cubs first base coach 2003–2004	Succeeded by Gary Matthews
Preceded by Gary Matthews	Chicago Cubs hitting coach 2005–2006	Succeeded by Gerald Perry
