= Vic Harris (utility player) =

American baseball player (1950–2025)

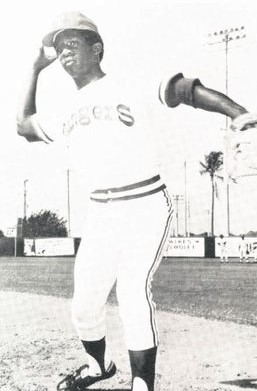
- Utility player
- Born: March 27, 1950; Los Angeles, California, U.S.
- Died: April 26, 2025 (aged 75)
- Batted: Switch Threw: Right

MLB debut
- July 21, 1972, for the Texas Rangers

Last MLB appearance
- October 5, 1980, for the Milwaukee Brewers

MLB statistics
- Batting average: .217
- Home runs: 13
- Runs batted in: 121
- Stats at Baseball Reference

Teams
- Texas Rangers (1972–1973); Chicago Cubs (1974–1975); St. Louis Cardinals (1976); San Francisco Giants (1977–1978); Milwaukee Brewers (1980); Kintetsu Buffaloes (1981–1983)

Victor Lanier Harris (March 27, 1950 – April 26, 2025) was an American former professional baseball utility player. He played in Major League Baseball from 1972 through 1980 for the Texas Rangers, Chicago Cubs, St. Louis Cardinals, San Francisco Giants and Milwaukee Brewers.

== College career ==
Harris attended Los Angeles High School and then played college baseball for two seasons (1969–70) at Los Angeles Valley College, where he was a two-time All-Metropolitan Conference selection. His sophomore year he was also selected All-Southern California and a Junior College All-American.

Harris was drafted in the first round of the secondary phase of the 1970 Major League Baseball draft by the Oakland Athletics.

== Professional career ==
=== Early career ===
Oakland assigned Harris to the Coos Bay-North Bend A's for the 1970 season, where he led his team in batting (.326) and stolen bases (30). Harris enjoyed another great season in 1971 for the Class A Burlington Bees of the Midwest League, leading the team in runs (84), hits (129), doubles (27), walks (77), and stolen bases (39). Harris began 1972 with Double A Birmingham A's and then after 32 games was promoted to Triple A Iowa Oaks.

On July 20, 1972, Harris was traded to the Texas Rangers and he made his major league debut for Texas the following day, entering the game as a defensive replacement and striking out in his first at bat. Harris would go another 35 at bats before recording a hit, an RBI single over Stan Bahnsen on August 8, in his 13th game. Harris' 36 at bats without a hit to start his MLB career is a record for futility that stands to this day. Despite the streak, Harris spent the rest of the season as the Rangers' regular second baseman, replacing Lenny Randle, hitting just .140 as a rookie.

In 1973, the Rangers moved Harris to center field, replacing Joe Lovitto. In his first, and what would prove to be only season as a regular, he batted .249 with 8 home runs and 44 runs batted in (RBI). He was traded along with Bill Madlock from the Rangers to the Chicago Cubs for Ferguson Jenkins on October 25, 1973. Called "the most valuable property in our organization" by his Rangers manager Whitey Herzog, the switch‐hitting Harris brought to the Cubs youth, speed and the versatility to play both middle infield positions plus third base and center field.

Harris started the 1974 season back at second base, where he was the starter for most of the first half of the season. However, after hitting just .195 in 62 games, Harris season ended midway through the year due to knee surgery. He was replaced by Dave Rosello and Billy Grabarkewitz. Harris spent 1975 on the Cubs' bench, being used mostly as a pinch hitter and batting .179. That winter, he was traded to the St. Louis Cardinals for infielder Mick Kelleher.

=== Journeyman ===
Harris spent the next three seasons with the Cardinals and then the San Francisco Giants, serving as a utilityman, playing all three outfield positions along with second base, third base, and shortstop 1978. He was signed to a minor league contract by the Milwaukee Brewers. After a season back in the minors, Harris played in 34 games for the Brewers in 1980 to close out his major league career.

=== Japan ===
Harris became a free agent after the 1980 season, and for 1981 he signed with the Kinetsu Buffaloes. That season, he batted .268 with 22 home runs and 74 RBI, all of which would have been MLB career highs. The following season, while he batted .272, his power declined, and Harris totaled just 9 home runs and 35 RBI. After another decline the following season with injuries and a .198 average, Harris's Japanese career was done. He played one final season back in the states in the minors with the Louisville Redbirds in the Cardinals' organization before retiring.

=== Overview ===
Harris wound up playing 579 games in the majors, and was a true utilityman. He played at least 27 games at six different positions, with the largest number, 212, coming at second base.

== Personal ==
After baseball, Harris lived in the Los Angeles area, working in the aerospace industry for Rockwell and then as an emergency fire dispatcher for Boeing. He also worked as youth baseball instructor from 2006 to 2013.

Harris died on April 26, 2025.
