= Selma Unified School District =

School district in California, United States

Coordinates: 36.5795°N 119.6196°W

Location
- 3036 Thompson Ave; Selma, California United States

District information
- Type: Public
- Grades: K–12
- Established: 1877
- Superintendent: Dr. Tanya Fisher
- Schools: 11

Students and staff
- Students: 6,390 (2008–09)
- Teachers: 309.1 (on FTE basis)
- Student–teacher ratio: 20.7:1

Other information
- Website: www.selmausd.org

Selma Unified School District is a school district located in Selma, California. It consists of eleven schools, one high school, one middle school, eight elementary schools, and one continuation/adult school.

The district includes Selma and a piece of Parlier.

== Schools ==
Secondary schools

- Selma High
- Abraham Lincoln Middle School

Elementary Schools

- Eric White Elementary
- Garfield Elementary
- Indianola Elementary
- Jackson Elementary
- Roosevelt Elementary
- Terry Elementary
- Washington Elementary
- Wilson Elementary

Continuation/Adult school

- Heartland Alternative School/Selma Adult ISP
