= 1972 Baltimore Orioles season =

Major League Baseball season

1972 Baltimore Orioles
- League: American League
- Division: East
- Ballpark: Memorial Stadium
- City: Baltimore, Maryland
- Record: 80–74 (.519)
- Divisional place: 3rd
- Owners: Jerold Hoffberger
- General managers: Frank Cashen
- Managers: Earl Weaver
- Television: WJZ-TV
- Radio: WBAL (AM) (Chuck Thompson, John Gordon, Bill O'Donnell)

The 1972 Baltimore Orioles season was a season in American baseball. It involved the Orioles finishing third in the American League East with a record of 80 wins and 74 losses.

== Offseason ==
- October 22, 1971: Mike Ferraro and Mike Herson (minors) were traded by the Orioles to the Milwaukee Brewers for Tom Matchick and Bruce Look.
- November 29, 1971: Tom Walker was drafted from the Orioles by the Montreal Expos in the 1971 rule 5 draft.
- December 2, 1971: Frank Robinson and Pete Richert were traded by the Orioles to the Los Angeles Dodgers for Doyle Alexander, Bob O'Brien, Sergio Robles, and Royle Stillman.
- December 9, 1971: Curt Motton was traded by the Orioles to the Milwaukee Brewers for a player to be named later and cash. The Brewers completed the deal by sending Bob Reynolds to the Orioles on March 25, 1972.
- Prior to 1972 season: Lew Beasley was acquired from the Orioles by the Texas Rangers.

== Regular season ==
Frank Robinson's number 20 was retired by the Baltimore Orioles in 1972.

=== Season standings ===
AL East
Team	W	L	Pct.	GB	Home	Road
Detroit Tigers	86	70	.551	—	44‍–‍34	42‍–‍36
Boston Red Sox	85	70	.548	½	52‍–‍26	33‍–‍44
Baltimore Orioles	80	74	.519	5	38‍–‍39	42‍–‍35
New York Yankees	79	76	.510	6½	46‍–‍31	33‍–‍45
Cleveland Indians	72	84	.462	14	43‍–‍34	29‍–‍50
Milwaukee Brewers	65	91	.417	21	37‍–‍42	28‍–‍49

=== Record vs. opponents ===
1972 American League records Sources:
Team	BAL	BOS	CAL	CWS	CLE	DET	KC	MIL	MIN	NYY	OAK	TEX
Baltimore	—	7–11	6–6	8–4	8–10	10–8	6–6	10–5	6–6	7–6	6–6	6–6
Boston	11–7	—	8–4	6–6	8–7	5–9	6–6	11–7	4–8	9–9	9–3	8–4
California	6–6	4–8	—	7–11	8–4	5–7	9–6	7–5	7–8	4–8	8–10	10–7
Chicago	4–8	6–6	11–7	—	8–4	5–7	8–9	9–3	8–6	7–5	7–8	14–4
Cleveland	10–8	7–8	4–8	4–8	—	10–8	6–6	5–10	8–4	7–11	2–10	9–3
Detroit	8–10	9–5	7–5	7–5	8–10	—	7–5	10–8	9–3	7–9	4–8	10–2
Kansas City	6–6	6–6	6–9	9–8	6–6	5–7	—	7–5	9–9	7–5	7–11	8–6
Milwaukee	5–10	7–11	5–7	3–9	10–5	8–10	5–7	—	4–8	9–9	4–8	5–7
Minnesota	6–6	8–4	8–7	6–8	4–8	3–9	9–9	8–4	—	6–6	8–9	11–7
New York	6–7	9–9	8–4	5–7	11–7	9–7	5–7	9–9	6–6	—	3–9	8–4
Oakland	6–6	3–9	10–8	8–7	10–2	8–4	11–7	8–4	9–8	9–3	—	11–4
Texas	6–6	4–8	7–10	4–14	3–9	2–10	6–8	7–5	7–11	4–8	4–11	—

=== Notable transactions ===
- April 2, 1972: Dave Boswell was released by the Orioles.
- August 18, 1972: Elrod Hendricks was traded by the Orioles to the Chicago Cubs for Tommy Davis.
- August 22, 1972: Chico Salmon was released by the Orioles.

==== Draft picks ====
- June 6, 1972: Bobby Brown was drafted by the Orioles in the 11th round of the 1972 Major League Baseball draft.

=== Roster ===
1972 Baltimore Orioles
Roster
Pitchers: 13 Doyle Alexander; 35 Mike Cuellar; 37 Pat Dobson; 44 Roric Harrison; 23 Grant Jackson; 40 Dave Leonhard; 19 Dave McNally; 22 Jim Palmer; 34 Bob Reynolds; 43 Mickey Scott; 39 Eddie Watt	Catchers: 8 Andy Etchebarren; 10 Elrod Hendricks; 12 Johnny Oates; 10 Sergio Robles; Infielders: 7 Mark Belanger; 32 Enos Cabell; 3,16 Bobby Grich; 15 Davey Johnson; 32 Tom Matchick; 26 Boog Powell; 5 Brooks Robinson; 30 Chico Salmon	Outfielders: 25 Don Baylor; 6 Paul Blair; 9 Don Buford; 1 Al Bumbry; 2 Rich Coggins; 11 Terry Crowley; 36 Tommy Davis; 14 Merv Rettenmund; 28 Tom Shopay	Manager: 4 Earl Weaver; Coaches: 31 George Bamberger; 41 Jim Frey; 55 Billy Hunter; 48 George Staller

== Player stats ==
=== Batting ===
==== Starters by position ====
Note: Pos = Position; G = Games played; AB = At bats; H = Hits; Avg. = Batting average; HR = Home runs; RBI = Runs batted in

Pos	Player	G	AB	H	Avg.	HR	RBI
C	Johnny Oates	85	253	66	.261	4	21
1B	Boog Powell	140	465	.117	252	21	81
2B	Davey Johnson	118	376	83	.221	5	32
3B	Brooks Robinson	153	556	139	.250	8	64
SS	Mark Belanger	113	285	53	.186	2	16
LF	Don Buford	125	408	84	.206	5	22
CF	Paul Blair	142	477	111	.233	8	49
RF	Merv Rettenmund	102	301	70	.233	6	21

==== Other batters ====
Note: G = Games played; AB = At bats; H = Hits; Avg. = Batting average; HR = Home runs; RBI = Runs batted in

Player	G	AB	H	Avg.	HR	RBI
Bobby Grich	133	460	128	.278	12	50
Don Baylor	102	320	81	.253	11	38
Terry Crowley	97	247	57	.231	11	29
Andy Etchebarren	71	188	38	.202	2	21
Elrod Hendricks	33	84	13	.155	0	4
Tommy Davis	26	82	21	.256	0	6
Tom Shopay	49	40	9	.225	0	2
Rich Coggins	16	39	13	.333	0	1
Chico Salmon	17	16	1	.063	0	0
Al Bumbry	9	11	4	.364	0	0
Tom Matchick	3	9	2	.222	0	0
Enos Cabell	3	5	0	.000	0	1
Sergio Robles	2	5	1	.200	0	0

=== Pitching ===
==== Starting pitchers ====
Note: G = Games pitched; IP = Innings pitched; W = Wins; L = Losses; ERA = Earned run average; SO = Strikeouts

Player	G	IP	W	L	ERA	SO
Jim Palmer	36	274.1	21	10	2.07	184
Pat Dobson	38	268.1	16	18	2.65	161
Mike Cuellar	35	248.1	18	12	2.57	132
Dave McNally	36	241.0	13	17	2.95	120

==== Other pitchers ====
Note: G = Games pitched; IP = Innings pitched; W = Wins; L = Losses; ERA = Earned run average; SO = Strikeouts

Player	G	IP	W	L	ERA	SO
Doyle Alexander	35	106.1	6	8	2.45	49

==== Relief pitchers ====
Note: G = Games pitched; W = Wins; L = Losses; SV = Saves; ERA = Earned run average; SO = Strikeouts

Player	G	W	L	SV	ERA	SO
Grant Jackson	32	1	1	8	2.63	34
Roric Harrison	39	3	4	4	2.30	62
Eddie Watt	38	2	3	7	2.17	23
Mickey Scott	15	0	1	0	2.74	11
Dave Leonhard	14	0	0	0	4.50	7
Bob Reynolds	3	0	0	0	1.86	5

== Awards and honors ==
- Brooks Robinson, Commissioner's Award

== Farm system ==
Level	Team	League	Manager
AAA	Rochester Red Wings	International League	Joe Altobelli
AA	Asheville Orioles	Southern League	Cal Ripken Sr.
A	Lodi Orioles	California League	Jimmie Schaffer
A	Miami Orioles	Florida State League	Woody Smith
A-Short Season	Lewiston Broncs	Northwest League	Bobby Malkmus
Rookie	Bluefield Orioles	Appalachian League	George Farson

LEAGUE CHAMPIONS: Miami, Lewiston
