= Roy Foster (baseball) =

American baseball player (1945–2008)

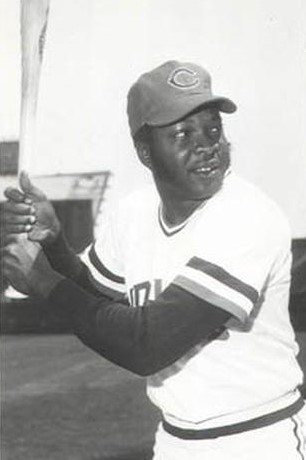
- Outfielder
- Born: July 29, 1945; Bixby, Oklahoma, U.S.
- Died: March 21, 2008 (aged 62); Tulsa, Oklahoma, U.S.
- Batted: Right Threw: Right

MLB debut
- April 7, 1970, for the Cleveland Indians

Last MLB appearance
- October 1, 1972, for the Cleveland Indians

MLB statistics
- Batting average: .253
- Home runs: 45
- Runs batted in: 118
- Stats at Baseball Reference

Teams
- Cleveland Indians (1970–1972)

Roy Foster (July 29, 1945 – March 21, 2008) was an American outfielder in Major League Baseball who played for the Cleveland Indians from 1970 to 1972. Born in Bixby, Oklahoma, he batted .268 with 23 home runs and 60 runs batted in as a 1970 rookie, and received one vote for the American League's Rookie of the Year Award. He was traded along with Frank Coggins and cash from the Milwaukee Brewers to the Indians for Russ Snyder and Max Alvis during spring training on April 4, 1970. He was dealt along with Rich Hand, Mike Paul and Ken Suarez from the Indians to the Texas Rangers for Del Unser, Denny Riddleberger, Terry Ley and Gary Jones at the Winter Meetings on December 2, 1971. Foster died in Tulsa at age 62. He had the nickname of "Captain Easy".

Foster was inducted posthumously into Booker T. Washington’s 2022 Ring of Honor class during a ceremony between the Hornets’ basketball games against Bixby on Friday night, Feb 4, 2022 at Nathan E. Harris Fieldhouse.
