= Rich Hand =

American baseball player (born 1948)

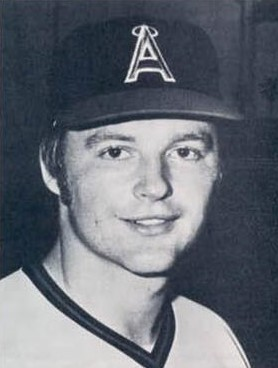
- Hand with the California Angels in 1973
- Pitcher
- Born: July 10, 1948 (age 78); Bellevue, Washington, U.S.
- Batted: Right Threw: Right

MLB debut
- April 9, 1970, for the Cleveland Indians

Last MLB appearance
- September 26, 1973, for the California Angels

MLB statistics
- Win–loss record: 24–39
- Earned run average: 4.01
- Strikeouts: 278
- Stats at Baseball Reference

Teams
- Cleveland Indians (1970–1971); Texas Rangers (1972–1973); California Angels (1973)

Richard Allen Hand (born July 10, 1948) is an American former professional baseball player. A right-handed pitcher, he played for four seasons in Major League Baseball (MLB) for the Cleveland Indians, Texas Rangers and California Angels.

Born in Bellevue, Washington, Hand graduated from Lincoln High School in Seattle and attended the University of Puget Sound. Drafted three times, he signed with the Indians when they selected him in the supplementary phase of the 1969 MLB draft. Named the number three pitcher in the starting rotation in 1970, he posted a 3.83 earned run average (ERA) in 35 appearances. Hand was sent to the minor leagues for part of 1971; he threw a no-hitter for the Wichita Aeros but posted a 5.79 ERA in the major leagues.

Traded to the Rangers for the 1972 season, Hand began the season in the minor leagues but was promoted to the major-league team after only two starts. He posted a career-best 3.32 ERA but had only a 10–14 record, partly due to poor run support. He was traded to the Angels midway through the 1973 season, pitching mainly out of the bullpen after coming to California. Following one last professional season in 1974, Hand retired, his pitching arm sore from injuries sustained over the years. Remaining in the Dallas–Fort Worth metroplex, Hand worked in business, real estate, and construction.

== Early life and college ==
Born in Bellevue, Washington, on July 10, 1948, Richard Allen Hand was the third of four children of Leo and Betty Hand. His father earned a living as a plumber. Though Hand played both basketball and baseball at Lincoln High School, basketball was the one he wanted to play professionally. He was a 38th-round pick of the Pittsburgh Pirates in the 1966 Major League Baseball (MLB) Draft, but chose to attend college instead. "I wasn't physically prepared to play professional baseball," he recalled.

Hand received a scholarship to play baseball and basketball at the University of Puget Sound. There, he discovered that baseball gave him his better chance of succeeding as a professional. He added to his experience by playing semipro baseball with the Alaska Goldpanners in the summers of 1967 and 1968, aiding the team to a fourth-place tie at the National Baseball Congress in the first of those years. A fifth-round draft pick of the New York Mets in the 1968 MLB draft, he declined their offer, saying it "insulted my intelligence". As a junior, the right-handed pitcher threw a no-hitter against Western Washington University, then earned All-America honors. Drafted by the Cleveland Indians in the supplementary phase of the 1969 MLB draft, Hand this time signed for a $17,000 bonus. "[Indians' scout Loyd] Christopher didn't offer me the world – but he offered me a chance and that's what I wanted most", Hand recalled. He finished his college career with a 21–6 record, striking out 216 batters in 215 innings pitched.

== Career ==
=== First professional season (1969) ===
Upon drafting Hand in 1969, the Indians assigned him to the Triple-A Portland Beavers of the Pacific Coast League. He made his professional debut with a relief appearance on June 15, allowing two runs in 1 2/3 innings. He defeated the Spokane Indians after allowing one run in eight innings for his first win on July 15, then won his next four decisions. In 14 games (13 starts), he had a 7–4 record, a 3.60 earned run average (ERA), 52 strikeouts, 34 walks, and 83 hits allowed in 85 innings.

=== Cleveland Indians (1970–1971) ===
==== 1970 ====
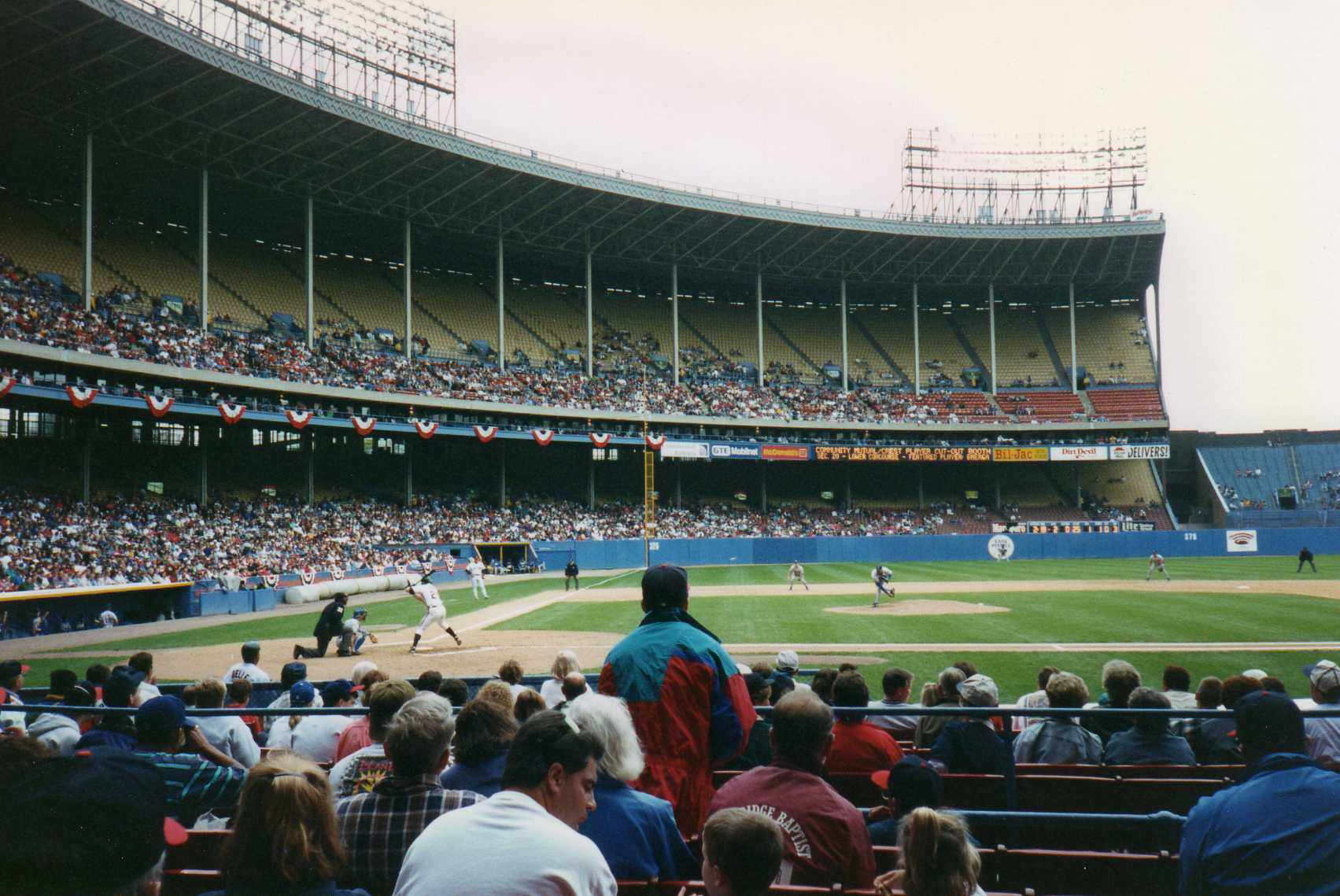
Cleveland Stadium was Hand's home ballpark during his two years with the Indians.

In 1970, the Indians invited Hand to spring training. Bothered by a sore back in the beginning, he recovered in time to become a surprise choice as the third member of the team's starting rotation. Manager Alvin Dark explained, "I've seen all I need to see. The kid has done everything we could possibly ask him to do and I'm convinced he can help us as a starter or a long reliever. Any experience he needs, he can get up here with us." In his MLB debut on April 9, Hand allowed six runs in 3 1/3 innings, taking the loss in a 13–1 defeat to the Baltimore Orioles. He was moved to the bullpen in early May but rejoined the rotation on May 18. His first win came on June 7, when he allowed four runs and came within one out of throwing a complete game in a 6–4 victory over the California Angels.

Dark feared that he may have overused Hand during his rookie season. On June 16, Hand had allowed one run in eight innings against the Angels. The manager was planning to replace him after the eighth, but Hand responded, "Aw, c'mon, Skip. Let me finish. I gotta finish a game." Up to that point, he had not thrown a complete game. "And like an idiot I said okay", Dark wrote in his autobiography. "He wound up throwing about 150 pitches that day. The next time he was due to pitch he came to me complaining of a sore elbow... Rich Hand wasn't the same after that."

Still, there were highlights for Hand in the latter part of the year. He threw his first shutout on July 16, holding the Kansas City Royals to four hits in a 6–0 victory. In the second game of a doubleheader against the Angels on August 28, he threw a complete game and allowed just one hit, a home run to Roger Repoz in a 5–1 Cleveland victory. In 35 games (25 starts), he had a 6–13 record, a 3.83 ERA, 110 strikeouts, 69 walks, and 132 hits allowed in 159 2/3 innings. He allowed 27 home runs, the ninth-highest total in the American League (AL).

==== 1971 ====
Sam McDowell, Cleveland's best pitcher, said he expected Hand to have a good year in 1971: "Rich Hand will be our third starter and I know he's going to be a lot better. Remember, he was just a rookie last summer." A strained forearm muscle forced Hand to start the season on the disabled list. He missed about a month of the season before returning to action on May 8 and joining the starting rotation on May 21. After going 1–4 with a 4.65 ERA through July 7, Hand was sent down to the Indians' Triple-A team, which in 1971 was the Wichita Aeros of the American Association.

Sent to Wichita to pitch more regularly, Hand had more success. On August 19, he no-hit the Tulsa Oilers. Said Hall of Famer and Tulsa manager Warren Spahn, "He pitched a good game, and it looks to me as if he's a little too good for this classification." In 11 starts, Hand had an 8–2 record, a 1.88 ERA, 50 strikeouts, 40 walks, and 66 hits allowed in 86 innings pitched. He expressed annoyance at having to wait until the end of Wichita's season to be recalled by Cleveland, however, saying, "They just left me there to rot." He won his first start back with the Indians but lost two others, posting an 8.10 ERA in the season's final month. "I had thrown so much that I was really physically depleted. I didn't do too well, and that made me mad," Hand said afterwards. In 15 games (12 starts) for the Indians, he had a 2–6 record, a 5.79 ERA, 26 strikeouts, 38 walks, and 74 hits allowed in 60 2/3 innings.

=== Texas Rangers (1972–1973) ===
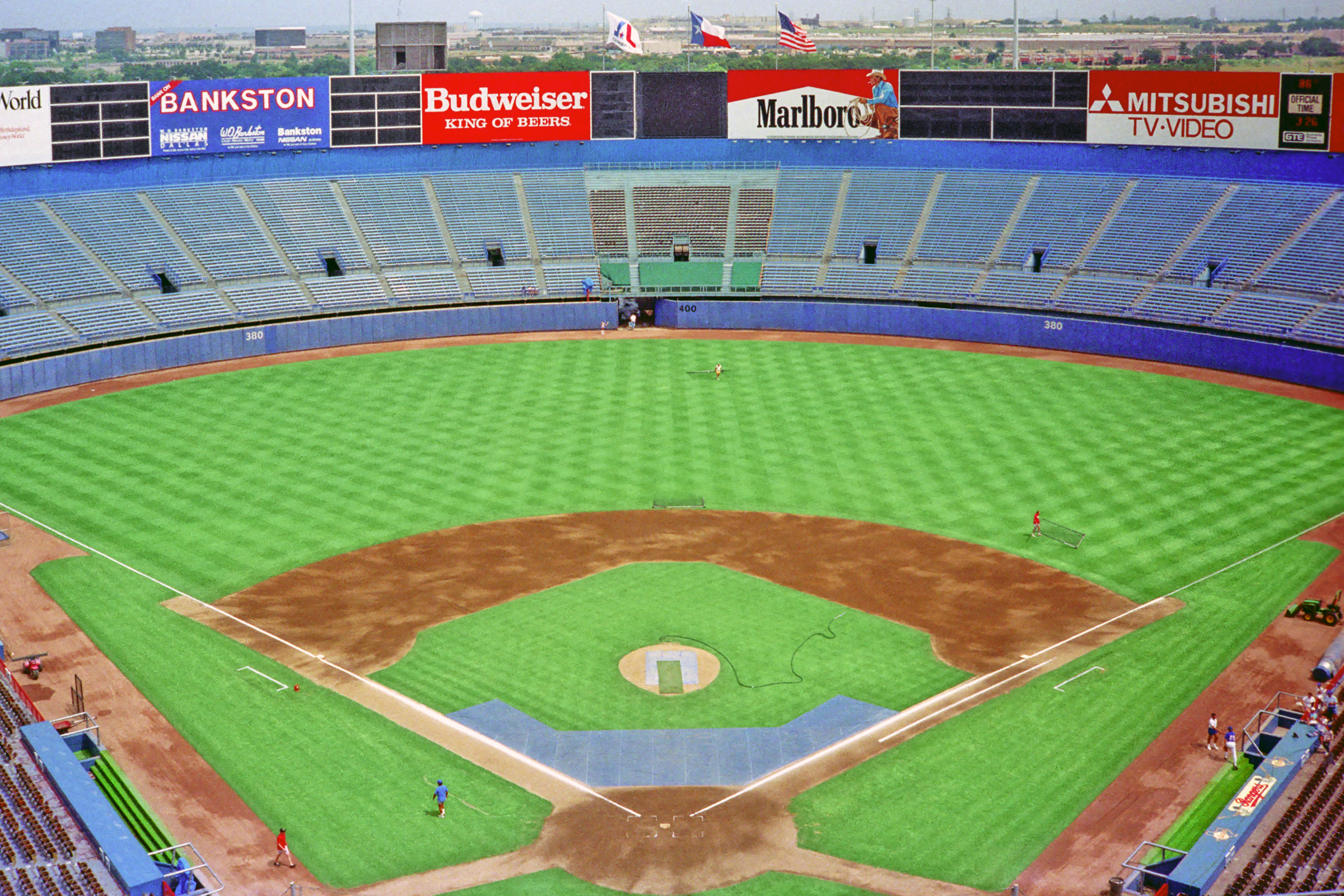
The Rangers played at Arlington Stadium during Hand's tenure with them.

At the Winter Meetings on December 2, 1971, Hand was traded with Roy Foster, Ken Suarez, and Mike Paul from the Indians to the Texas Rangers for Del Unser, Denny Riddleberger, Terry Ley, and Gary Jones. Merle Hereyford reported that Unser and Hand were the "keys" to the transaction.

The Rangers sent Hand to the Triple-A Denver Bears of the Pacific Coast League to begin the year, much to his frustration. "Nothing in baseball ever has surprised me more", he told reporters. "Bitter? yes, I think that's a fair appraisal. I didn't have a great spring, I know that, but then who did on our staff?" He made only two starts for Denver, however, before replacing an injured Don Stanhouse in Texas's rotation in early May. He said he was nervous when he first returned to the majors but that his pitching improved when "I just started pitching … reaching back, letting it fly and putting things out of my mind, like going back to Denver." From July 8 through July 23, he had four straight starts in which he allowed one run or fewer, including a shutout against the Indians on July 13. In the only one of those outings he did not win, he held the Orioles to one run through 10 innings before Baltimore ultimately bested the Rangers in the 15th. He was 10–8 with a 2.56 ERA through August 22 before losing 6 of his last 7 starts and posting a 6.42 ERA. In 30 games (28 starts), he had a 10–14 record, a 3.32 ERA, 109 strikeouts, and 139 hits allowed in 170 2/3 innings. Hall of Famer and Texas manager Ted Williams pointed out that Hand's losing record was partially due to low run support; the team did not score in Hand's first 23 1/3 innings. "Look at Hand. He could be a 15-game winner right now with no effort at all", Williams said late in the year. Hand walked 103 batters, third in the AL to Nolan Ryan's 157 and Joe Coleman's 110. Hand's 10 wins led Ranger pitchers, and Hand made 15 straight starts in which he allowed three earned runs or fewer, a feat not accomplished by a Ranger again until Nick Martinez did so in 2015.

In 8 games (7 starts) for the Rangers in 1973, Hand had a 2–3 record, a 5.40 ERA, 14 strikeouts, 19 walks, and 49 hits allowed in 41 2/3 innings. On May 20, he was dealt along with Mike Epstein and Rick Stelmaszek from the Rangers to the California Angels for Jim Spencer and Lloyd Allen. "I couldn't have been happier where I was," said a disappointed Hand. "It's not the greatest team right now, but it's headed in the right direction. I wanted to grow with this team and I hate to leave Arlington. That's a fine place to live." Hand continued to make the area his home even after his career ended.

=== California Angels (1973) ===
With the Angels in 1973, Hand mostly worked out of the bullpen in long-relief situations. Arm injuries caused him to spend time on the disabled list. He returned to the starting rotation in September, however, posting a 2–1 record and a 2.77 ERA. On September 26, he had allowed three runs against the Rangers but took the mound in the top of the eighth with California leading 4–3. Jeff Burroughs tied it with a home run, after which Hand was removed from the game, though California went on to win 5–4. That was Hand's final game of the year. In 16 games (6 starts) for California, he had a 4–3 record, a 3.62 ERA, 19 strikeouts, 21 walks, and 58 hits allowed in 54 2/3 innings. Over 24 games (13 starts) combined between Texas and California in 1973, he had a 6–6 record, a 4.39 ERA, 33 strikeouts, 40 walks, and 107 hits allowed in 96 1/3 innings.

=== Final professional season (1974) ===
Sent down to the Salt Lake City Angels of the Pacific Coast League in 1974, Hand considered not playing but ultimately decided to pitch for them. Appearing in 15 games (12 starts), he had a 3–8 record, a 5.63 ERA, 52 strikeouts, 41 walks, and 110 hits allowed in 88 innings. Later in the year, he pitched for the Triple-A Pawtucket Red Sox of the International League. In 11 games (10 starts), he had a 2–3 record, a 2.91 ERA, 36 strikeouts, 25 walks, and 67 hits allowed in 68 innings.

On October 15, 1974, Hand was sent to the St. Louis Cardinals as the player to be named later in a trade that sent Orlando Peña to the Angels on September 5. He considered trying to make the Cardinals out of spring training in 1975 but ultimately decided to retire. "I probably exited the game too soon, but I had a lot of pain. … I still had some years left", he later recalled.

== Description, career statistics and pitching style ==
Hand was listed as 6 feet 1 inch (1.85 m) tall and 195 pounds (88 kg). Altogether, he appeared in 104 games (78 starts) in the majors, compiling a 24–39 record and a 4.01 ERA. In 4871/3 innings pitched, he allowed 452 hits and 250 walks, with 278 strikeouts. He threw three complete games and two shutouts; he registered three saves as a relief pitcher.

When he first reached the major leagues, Hand's primary pitch was his fastball. His arm injury in 1971 forced him to rethink his approach. "After I had my arm trouble, I knew I couldn't overpower people. I had to work on my control, on just getting the ball over, in order to get people out. So I came up with better control than I had ever had and even after my arm came back, I still had it," he stated in an interview over the 1971–72 offseason. Sportswriter Mike Shropshire observed that Hand did not throw hard, noting that he and Mike Paul "knew how to pitch but had arms like worn-out rubber bands."

== Personal life ==
Hand continued to take college classes via correspondence courses after his professional career began, and he completed his political science degree in 1970. He married his first wife, Stephanie French, in November 1969, but the couple divorced in 1972. That September, Terrie Molnar became his second wife. She was a teacher from Cleveland. Mike Paul served as Hand's best man at the wedding, and several of Hand's other former Indians teammates attended. Rich and Terrie had a son and a daughter, but they eventually divorced. Hand married his third wife, Susan Hardin, in 1987. He and Susan had four daughters, all athletes. Whitney Hand played college basketball for the Oklahoma Sooners. She was drafted by a team in the Women's National Basketball Association, but knee injuries prompted her to retire instead. Her husband, Landry Jones, was a quarterback for the Oklahoma football team and later for the Pittsburgh Steelers of the National Football League.

Having moved to Arlington during his time with the Rangers, Hand remained in the Dallas–Fort Worth metroplex following his career. He worked in business and real estate. Other sources of income for Hand included construction companies which he owned and an asset-managing company he was the assistant manager of. Hand appeared at multiple team functions for the Rangers over the years and was involved with the Major League Baseball Players Alumni Association.
