= Jim Merritt (baseball) =

American baseball player (born 1943)

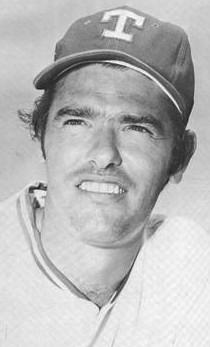
- Merritt in 1974
- Pitcher
- Born: December 9, 1943 (age 82); Altadena, California, U.S.
- Batted: Left Threw: Left

MLB debut
- August 2, 1965, for the Minnesota Twins

Last MLB appearance
- May 23, 1975, for the Texas Rangers

MLB statistics
- Win–loss record: 81–86
- Earned run average: 3.65
- Strikeouts: 932
- Stats at Baseball Reference

Teams
- Minnesota Twins (1965–1968); Cincinnati Reds (1969–1972); Texas Rangers (1973–1975)

Career highlights and awards
- All-Star (1970)

James Joseph Merritt (born December 9, 1943) is an American former left-handed Major League Baseball pitcher.

== Minnesota Twins ==
Merritt originally signed with the Los Angeles Dodgers out of Edgewood High School in West Covina, California, but was plucked from their organization by the Minnesota Twins in the 1961 first-year draft before pitching a game for his home team. He went 54–45 with a 3.39 earned run average and 719 strikeouts over four seasons in their farm system when he was called up to the majors in 1965 by the first place Twins just before World Series rosters were set. He made two appearances in the 1965 World Series against his former franchise, pitching 3.1 innings and giving up an earned run.

Merritt got off to a horrible start in 1966. Despite a respectable 2.95 ERA, his record stood at 0–6 on July 1 thanks to a lack of run support. He turned his season around on July 21 with a three hit gem against the Washington Senators in which he struck out twelve and matched an American League record with seven strikeouts in a row. He ended the season at 7–14 with a 3.38 ERA.

He established himself as one of the better control pitchers in the AL in 1967 by striking out 161 batters while giving up just 30 walks. He also logged the league's fifth lowest ERA at 2.53. Following the 1968 season, he was traded even-up to the Cincinnati Reds for shortstop Leo Cárdenas.

== Cincinnati Reds ==
The Reds battled the Dodgers, Atlanta Braves and San Francisco Giants for first place in the National League West all through the 1969 season. Merritt's sixteenth victory on August 31 moved his team into a second place tie with the Dodgers, a half game back of the Giants. From there, however, things went south for Merritt as he lost four of his last five decisions. His final loss of the season, against the Houston Astros, eliminated the Reds from playoff contention.

On May 17, 1970, Merritt held Hank Aaron hitless as he stood one hit shy of 3000. His record stood at 14–7 with a 3.46 ERA at the 1970 All-Star break to earn selection to Gil Hodges' National League squad. He pitched two innings, striking out Frank Robinson, and giving up a single to former teammate, Harmon Killebrew.

He finished the season at 20–12, and edging out Gary Nolan for the Johnny Vander Meer Award given each year to the Reds' top pitcher. His only career 20-win season was also the first 20-win season for a Reds left-handed pitcher since Eppa Rixey in 1925. He also clubbed three home runs.

The "Big Red Machine" won 102 games and coasted to the post season. Merritt won game two of the Reds' three-game sweep of the Pittsburgh Pirates in the 1970 National League Championship Series, however, Merritt and the Reds were less successful in the World Series against the Baltimore Orioles. The O's defeated the Reds in five games. Merritt started the decisive game, and gave up three earned runs in 1.2 innings of work to take the loss.

After starting 1971 with a record of 0–8 and a 4.96 ERA, Merritt was moved into the bullpen. He lost two games in relief and two more spot starts to bring his record to 0–11 with a 5.38 ERA on August 3. He won his only game of the season on August 21 against the Pirates.

His lack of success in 1971 was attributed to an elbow injury suffered at the end of the 1970 season. He made just four appearances in 1972, and was sent to the Triple-A Indianapolis Indians on May 6. He went 4–8 with a 4.33 ERA for Indianapolis. Following the season, he was dealt to the Texas Rangers for Jim Driscoll and Hal King.

== Texas Rangers ==
Merritt started the 1973 season in the bullpen, but moved into the starting rotation in June. Texas lost 105 games in 1973. For his part, Merritt was 5–13 with a save and a 4.05 ERA. Over the following two seasons, Merritt appeared in 31 more games for Texas without a decision or save. He was released on July 17, 1975. Perhaps the most notable moment of his Texas Rangers career occurred on August 23, 1973, when Merritt credited the three hit shutout he pitched against the Cleveland Indians to the 25 "Gaylord fastballs" he threw. The following day, AL President Joe Cronin fined Merritt for throwing spitters.

== Career stats ==
W	L	PCT	ERA	G	GS	CG	SHO	SV	IP	H	ER	R	HR	BB	BAA	K	WP	HBP	Fld%	Avg.
81	86	.485	3.65	297	192	56	9	7	1483	1468	602	657	160	322	.257	932	32	25	.950	.141

Merritt led the NL with fifteen successful bunts in 1969. For his career, he had four home runs and five runs batted in. Merritt held left handed hitters to a .225 batting average.
