= Ken Aspromonte =

American baseball player and manager (born 1931)

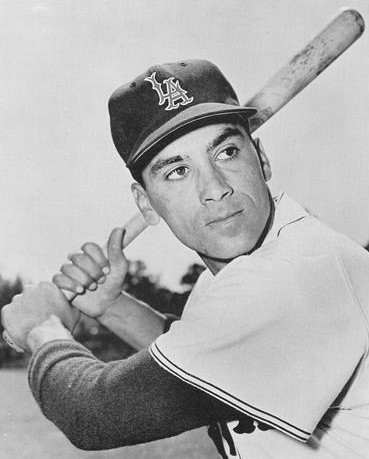
- Aspromonte in 1961
- Second baseman / Manager
- Born: September 22, 1931 (age 95); Brooklyn, New York, U.S.
- Batted: Right Threw: Right

MLB debut
- September 2, 1957, for the Boston Red Sox

Last MLB appearance
- June 21, 1963, for the Chicago Cubs

MLB statistics
- Batting average: .249
- Home runs: 19
- Runs batted in: 124
- Managerial record: 220–260
- Winning %: .458
- Stats at Baseball Reference
- Managerial record at Baseball Reference

Teams
- As player: Boston Red Sox (1957–1958); Washington Senators (1958–1960); Cleveland Indians (1960; 1961–1962); Los Angeles Angels (1961); Milwaukee Braves (1962); Chicago Cubs (1963); Chunichi Dragons (1964–1965); Taiyo Whales (1966); As manager: Cleveland Indians (1972–1974)

Kenneth Joseph Aspromonte (/æsproʊˈmɒntiː/ as-proh-MON-tee; born September 22, 1931) is an American former professional baseball player and manager. During his active career, Aspromonte spent all or parts of seven seasons (1957–63) in the Major Leagues, mostly as a second baseman, for the Boston Red Sox, Washington Senators, Cleveland Indians and Los Angeles Angels of the American League, and the Milwaukee Braves and Chicago Cubs of the National League. He spent three years (1964–66) playing in Japan with the Chunichi Dragons and Taiyo Whales. He also managed in the Major Leagues for three full seasons as skipper of the 1972–74 Indians.

The native of Bensonhurst, Brooklyn is the older brother of Bob Aspromonte, who had a 13-year career as a third baseman in the National League.

== Playing career ==
Ken Aspromonte batted and threw right-handed, and was listed as 6 feet (1.8 m) tall and 180 pounds (82 kg). He signed with the Red Sox in 1950 and spent six years in the minors, plus two in military service, before reaching the big leagues in September 1957 after he led the Pacific Coast League in batting average (.334) for the San Francisco Seals. After only 30 games played with Boston in 1957–58, he was traded to the Senators, where he spent almost two full seasons. However, his most successful MLB year came in a Cleveland uniform in 1960. Traded to the Indians on May 15, he started 78 games at second base and 35 at third base, and batted a career-high .290 with ten home runs. But Cleveland left him exposed to the 1960 Major League Baseball expansion draft and Aspromonte was the 14th player selected by the Angels, 27th overall, in the lottery.

He was the starting second baseman in the Angels' first-ever American League game on April 11, 1961, against the Baltimore Orioles. Batting second in the lineup behind Eddie Yost, Aspromonte went one-for-four at the plate, making one error in eight chances in the field, as Los Angeles won, 7–2. But Aspromonte struggled at the bat through the season's early weeks, and was hitting only .223 when he was placed on waivers and claimed by his old team, the Indians, on July 3. Relegated to a utility role, he played in only 42 games over a full calendar year for Cleveland. Then his contract was sold to the Braves, where Aspromonte backed up second baseman Frank Bolling and third baseman Eddie Mathews for the remainder of 1962. The Cubs acquired him in a midwinter deal, but he collected only five hits in 34 at bats in a utility role during the first two months of the 1963 campaign, and he was sent to the Pacific Coast League, where he finished his U.S. pro career. As a big-leaguer, he appeared in 475 games; his 369 hits included 69 doubles, three triples and 19 home runs.

During his three years in Nippon Professional Baseball, Aspromonte batted a robust .273 in 295 games, with 257 hits, 53 doubles and 31 home runs.

== Managing career ==
In 1968, Aspromonte returned to the Indians' organization as a manager in their farm system. After leading the 1969 Reno Silver Sox of the Class A California League to a winning record, he was promoted to Triple-A, where he spent two years at the helm of the Wichita Aeros, Cleveland's top affiliate. Aspromonte was named skipper of the MLB Indians on November 9, 1971, taking over a team that had lost 102 games in 1971 and finished 43 games out of first place in the American League East Division. But, fortified by the addition via a blockbuster trade of future Baseball Hall of Fame pitcher Gaylord Perry, who won 24 games, the 1972 Indians improved their record substantially. They won 72 of 156 games during the strike-abbreviated campaign and bettered their previous year's winning percentage by 0.92 points.

But the 1973 and 1974 clubs did not materially improve, falling into the division basement with 91 defeats in the former year, and losing 85 games in 1974 despite finishing fourth. His record in 1974 is deceiving, however; the team contended for much of the year-peaking at 45–35 July 4, in first place, and as late as September 8 was 71–70 and only six games back. But then the wheels came off, with the team posting a 6–15 finale to the season, ultimately ending Aspromonte's tenure there.

The acquisition of Frank Robinson that September — widely seen as the next Cleveland manager, positioned to become the first black pilot in the big-league history — made his position untenable. Aspromonte was notified September 27, 1974, by club owner Nick Mileti and general manager Phil Seghi that his contract would not be renewed for 1975, but he finished out the campaign, completing his managerial career with a mark of 220–260 (.458). The Indians then named Robinson their player-manager for 1975, to become the first African-American manager in big-league annals.

=== Managerial Record ===
Team	Year	Regular season					Postseason			
Team	Year	Games	Won	Lost	Win %	Finish	Won	Lost	Win %	Result
CLE	1972	156	72	84	.462	5th in the AL East	–	–	–	
CLE	1973	162	71	91	.438	6th in the AL East	–	–	–	
CLE	1974	162	77	85	.475	4th in the AL East	–	–	–	
Total		480	220	260	.458		0	0	–	
