= Denny Riddleberger =

American baseball player (born 1945)

- Pitcher
- Born: November 22, 1945 (age 80); Clifton Forge, Virginia, U.S.
- Batted: Right Threw: Left

MLB debut
- September 15, 1970, for the Washington Senators

Last MLB appearance
- September 24, 1972, for the Cleveland Indians

MLB statistics
- Win–loss record: 4–4
- Earned run average: 2.77
- Strikeouts: 95
- Stats at Baseball Reference

Teams
- Washington Senators (1970–1971); Cleveland Indians (1972)

Dennis Michael Riddleberger (born November 22, 1945) is an American former Major League Baseball pitcher. Listed at 6 feet 3 inches (1.91 m), 195 pounds (88 kg), Riddleberger threw left-handed and batted right-handed.

Dennis attended Churchland High School and then Old Dominion University in Norfolk, Virginia, Riddleberger was drafted by the Pittsburgh Pirates in 1967. He was 24–16 with a 3.22 earned run average over four seasons in their farm system when he was traded to the Washington Senators for George Brunet on August 31, 1970. That September, he was called up by the Senators, making his major league debut against the Baltimore Orioles.

Riddleberger spent the entire 1971 season in the majors, but after getting off to a slow start (11.12 ERA in April), found himself doing mostly mop-up duty. The Senators were 14-43 in games in which Rittleberger pitched. He ended the season with a 3-1 record and a far more respectable 3.23 ERA. He earned his only career save on July 5 against the Cleveland Indians.

Shortly after the Senators moved to the Dallas–Fort Worth metroplex and were rebranded as the Texas Rangers, Riddleberger was traded along with Del Unser, Terry Ley and Gary Jones to the Indians for Roy Foster, Rich Hand, Mike Paul and Ken Suarez at the Winter Meetings on December 2, 1971. Despite a below league average 2.50 ERA in 54 innings pitched in 1972, Riddleberger again found himself in mop up duty (the Indians were 4-34 in games in which he appeared). He spent 1973 with the Indians' triple A affiliate, the Oklahoma City 89ers before retiring.
