= Larry Gowell =

American baseball player (1948–2020)

- Pitcher
- Born: May 2, 1948; Lewiston, Maine
- Died: May 11, 2020 (aged 72); Auburn, Maine
- Batted: Right Threw: Right

MLB debut
- September 21, 1972, for the New York Yankees

Last MLB appearance
- October 4, 1972, for the New York Yankees

MLB statistics
- Win–loss record: 0–1
- Earned run average: 1.29
- Innings pitched: 7
- Strikeouts: 7
- Stats at Baseball Reference

Teams
- New York Yankees (1972)

Lawrence Clyde Gowell (/ˈɡaʊəl/ GOW-əl; May 2, 1948 – May 11, 2020) was an American professional baseball player. He was a right-handed pitcher who played in two games for the New York Yankees of Major League Baseball in 1972.

Gowell was drafted by the Yankees in the fourth round of the 1967 Major League Baseball draft on June 6, 1967. After winning every game he appeared in at Edward Little High School in Auburn, Maine, he was signed by the Yankees to a professional contract. He pitched in the minor leagues for six years before making his major league debut, after winning 11 games in a row in Double-A. Gowell was listed at 6 feet 2 inches (1.88 m) tall and 182 pounds (83 kg).

== Major league career ==
The Yankees called up Gowell from their minor league organization in 1972 to play as a September call-up. Gowell made his major league debut on September 21 against the Milwaukee Brewers. The game was held at County Stadium, with 4,185 people attending the game. After Rusty Torres pinch hit for Fred Beene in the sixth inning, Gowell came in to replace Beene on the mound in the bottom of the sixth. He pitched two innings with one strikeout before Felipe Alou was called on to pinch-hit for him in the top of the eighth inning. The Yankees lost the game 6-4. On October 4, as a starting pitcher (again facing Milwaukee) Gowell hit a double on a 3–2 count, hitting a fastball by pitcher Jim Lonborg for his first and only Major League hit and the last hit by a pitcher in a regular season American League game before the start of the designated hitter rule. The baseball that Gowell hit now resides in the National Baseball Hall of Fame and Museum, in Cooperstown, New York. Although Gowell allowed only one run during that game, the Yankees lost 1–0. It was Gowell's only MLB decision.

== Personal life and death ==
Gowell played in the minor leagues until 1975, when he then retired to become a life insurance agent, which he did for 35 years. He also spent time with his other passion in music, playing the horn and piano.

Gowell died while playing golf on May 11, 2020, aged 72.
