= Jim Panther =

American baseball player (born 1945)

- Pitcher
- Born: March 1, 1945 (age 81); Burlington, Iowa, U.S.
- Batted: Right Threw: Right

MLB debut
- April 5, 1971, for the Oakland Athletics

Last MLB appearance
- August 2, 1973, for the Atlanta Braves

MLB statistics
- Win–loss record: 7–13
- Earned run average: 5.26
- Strikeouts: 56
- Stats at Baseball Reference

Teams
- Oakland Athletics (1971); Texas Rangers (1972); Atlanta Braves (1973)

James Edward Panther (born March 1, 1945) is an American former professional baseball player. He played in Major League Baseball (MLB) as a right-handed pitcher from 1971 to 1973, for the Oakland Athletics, Texas Rangers and the Atlanta Braves.

Panther spent his college career at Southern Illinois University Carbondale where he was a member of Sigma Pi fraternity.

His career record in the major leagues was 7-13, with a 5.26 ERA.
