= Mike Paul =

American baseball player (born 1945)

- Pitcher
- Born: April 18, 1945 (age 81); Detroit, Michigan, U.S.
- Batted: Left Threw: Left

MLB debut
- May 27, 1968, for the Cleveland Indians

Last MLB appearance
- April 16, 1974, for the Chicago Cubs

MLB statistics
- Win–loss record: 27–48
- Earned run average: 3.91
- Strikeouts: 452
- Stats at Baseball Reference

Teams
- As player: Cleveland Indians (1968–1971); Texas Rangers (1972–1973); Chicago Cubs (1973–1974); As coach: Oakland Athletics (1987–1988); Seattle Mariners (1989–1991); Oakland Athletics (1992–1994)

Michael George Paul (born April 18, 1945) is an American former professional baseball left-handed pitcher. He played in Major League Baseball (MLB) from 1968 to 1974 for the Cleveland Indians, Texas Rangers and Chicago Cubs.

== Career ==
Drafted in the 20th round of the 1967 amateur draft out of the University of Arizona by the Indians, Paul had success in the minors and in less than two years was in a big league uniform. In 1967, he spent time with the Reno Silver Sox and Portland Beavers. With the Silver Sox, he had 3 wins and 2 losses with a 1.63 earned run average. In 72 innings (nine games), he struck out 103 batters. He didn't do as well with the Beavers, going 2–4 with a 3.94 earned run average with them. However, he struck out 37 batters in 32 innings of work. Overall, Paul went 5–6 with a 2.34 earned run average. He struck out 140 batters in 104 innings of work (18 games).

Paul again pitched for Reno in 1968, going 2–1 with a 1.09 earned run average and 49 strikeouts in four games (33 innings). He was called up to the major leagues, and on May 27, he made his big league debut. He performed well in his first appearances, going 2 2/3 innings, striking out four (including the first batter he faced, Frank Kostro), allowing only one hit and earning the save. Overall, Paul went 5–8 with a 3.93 earned run average in 91 2/3 innings of work in his rookie season. He allowed only 72 hits in 36 games (seven starts) and he walked 35 batters.

Despite posting a 3.61 earned run average for the 62–99 Indians in 1969, his record was 5–10. In 47 games (12 starts), he struck out 98 batters. He went only 2–8 with a 4.81 earned run average in 30 games (15 starts) in 1970. His performance was so unimpressive in fact that he spent 10 games in the minors with the Wichita Aeros, with whom he went 6–1 with a 2.15 earned run average in 71 innings of work. In 1971, he went 2–7 with a 5.95 earned run average in 17 games (12 starts), and he again spent time with Wichita, going 6–7 with a 4.37 earned run average in 17 games (107 innings).

Paul was traded with Roy Foster, Rich Hand and Ken Suarez from the Indians to the Rangers for Del Unser, Denny Riddleberger, Terry Ley and Gary Jones at the Winter Meetings on December 2, 1971.

Paul had the best year of his career with Texas in 1972, going 8–9 with a 2.17 earned run average in 49 games (20 starts). In 161 2/3 innings, he allowed only 149 hits, and he struck out 108 batters. His 2.17 earned run average was sixth best in the league, and his 139 Adjusted ERA+ was sixth best as well.

He began the 1973 season with the Rangers, going 5–4 with a 4.95 earned run average in 36 games (10 starts). On August 31, he was sent to the Cubs for a player to be named later, which ended up being Larry Gura. He made 11 appearances (one start) for the Cubs that year, going 0–1 with a 3.44 earned run average. Overall, Paul went 5–5 with a 4.68 earned run average in 1973.

1974 would end up being Paul's final season in the major leagues. He appeared in only two games, allowing four earned runs in 1 1/3 innings of work for a 27.00 earned run average. He played his final game on April 16, against the Pittsburgh Pirates.

After being released by the Cubs, Paul played in the Mexican League until 1982.

In his major league career, Paul went 27–48 with a 3.91 earned run average in 228 appearances (77 starts). In 627 2/3 innings, he walked 246 batters and struck out 452. As a batter, Paul had 148 at-bats, and hit .115 with 1 run batted in.
