= Del Unser =

American baseball player (born 1944)

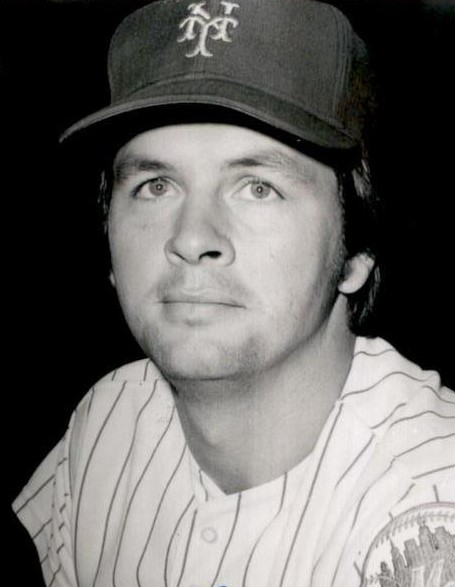
- Center fielder
- Born: December 9, 1944 (age 81); Decatur, Illinois, U.S.
- Batted: Left Threw: Left

MLB debut
- April 10, 1968, for the Washington Senators

Last MLB appearance
- June 6, 1982, for the Philadelphia Phillies

MLB statistics
- Batting average: .258
- Home runs: 87
- Runs batted in: 481
- Stats at Baseball Reference

Teams
- Washington Senators (1968–1971); Cleveland Indians (1972); Philadelphia Phillies (1973–1974); New York Mets (1975–1976); Montreal Expos (1976–1978); Philadelphia Phillies (1979–1982)

Career highlights and awards
- World Series champion (1980)

Delbert Bernard Unser (born December 9, 1944) is an American former professional baseball player. He played in Major League Baseball as a center fielder and utility player from 1968 to 1982, most prominently with the Philadelphia Phillies, where he was a member of the 1980 World Series winning team. He also played for the Washington Senators, Cleveland Indians, New York Mets and the Montreal Expos. His father was major league catcher Al Unser.

== College ==
Unser attended St. Teresa High School and played baseball at Eastern Illinois University and Mississippi State University. He was a three-year starter for Mississippi State, and was first team All-SEC as an outfielder in 1965 and 1966. In both seasons he helped Mississippi State to a conference championship. In 1966, Unser led the team in runs with 31, hits with 39, and a .333 batting average. That same year he was named a Sporting News All-American. In 1997, the university inducted Unser into the school's hall of fame.

== Pro career ==
The Minnesota Twins had selected Unser in the June draft in 1965, but Unser did not sign with them, nor did he sign with the Pittsburgh Pirates after they selected him in the winter draft in 1966. However, Unser was drafted in the first round of the June 1966 draft by the Washington Senators and signed with them, reporting to their Double-A team, the York White Roses of the Eastern League. Unser struggled his first season in the minors, batting only .220. However, management in Washington saw something in Unser, and in 1968, he made the leap from double-A to the majors. At the age of 23, on April 10, 1968, Unser made his MLB debut, against the team that had drafted him a year earlier, the Minnesota Twins. Unser got a hit in his major league debut.

Unser played for the Washington Senators from 1968 to 1971. In his first season, he had a five-hit game (four singles and a home run) against the Oakland Athletics on August 20, 1968. In the 1969 season, he led the American League in triples, with 8. The franchise was moved to the Dallas–Fort Worth metroplex and rebranded as the Texas Rangers, but Unser would not be part of the transition as he was dealt along with Denny Riddleberger, Terry Ley and Gary Jones to the Cleveland Indians for Roy Foster, Rich Hand, Mike Paul and Ken Suarez at the Winter Meetings on December 2, 1971.

Unser was traded again after one season in Cleveland, this time to the Philadelphia Phillies along with minor league third baseman Terry Wedgewood for Oscar Gamble and Roger Freed on December 1, 1972. He also played for the Phillies from 1973 to 1974. After a season batting .264 with 11 homers, Unser was dealt along with John Stearns and Mac Scarce from the Phillies to the New York Mets for Tug McGraw, Don Hahn and Dave Schneck at the Winter Meetings on December 3, 1974. He hit .294 for the Mets in 1975, and might have hit .300 that year, but sustained a late-season rib injury which affected his swing. He was hit by a pitch early in the 1976 season and sustained an arm injury, then was traded to the Montreal Expos on July 21.

In 1977, he began to be used primarily as a pinch-hitter, and also split his time on the field between the outfield and first base, and in winter of 1978 became a free agent, returning to the Phillies from 1979 to 1982.

Unser played a key role in the Phillies' 1980 World Series victory over the Kansas City Royals, getting crucial doubles to drive in runs as a pinch hitter in the late innings of Games 2 and 5. The first cut the Royals' lead from 4-2 to 4–3 in the bottom of the 8th inning, and scored the tying run before Mike Schmidt drove in the winning run with a double for a 2-0 Series lead for Philadelphia. In Game 5 in Kansas City and with the series tied at two games apiece, the Phillies were at bat in the top of the ninth and trailing by a score of 3–2. After Schmidt led off with a single, Unser again delivered a double to score Schmidt with the tying run. He later scored the go-ahead run on Manny Trillo's single as the Phillies won the game 4-3 to take a 3–2 lead in the World Series back to Philadelphia, where they closed it out in the 6th game.

Unser played a few more years in Philadelphia after that World Series win. However, on June 8, 1982, the Phillies released Unser, ending his stay in the major leagues.

Unser's career totals include 1,799 games played, 1,344 hits, 87 home runs, 481 runs batted in, and a lifetime batting average of .258. Unser, along with Lee Lacy, is one of two players to hit pinch-hit home runs in three consecutive at-bats.

== Post career ==
When Unser played in the minors, one of his coaches was the legendary Harry Walker, aka "Harry The Hat". Although Unser never hit in professional baseball the way he did in college, he was a star on defense. After he was released by the Phillies, Unser ran a sporting goods store, then returned to baseball as a coach, returning to the city of Philadelphia.

Unser was hired in 1983 by Phillies President Bill Giles to be a roving minor league instructor. When John Felske became the manager in 1985, Unser was offered the role of first base coach and hitting coach and jumped at the chance for the role. After a few years of being a coach, Phillies general manager Lee Thomas offered Unser the role of farm director, a position he would hold for the next nine seasons. Unser oversaw the development of future Phillies stars like Mike Lieberthal, Jimmy Rollins and Scott Rolen. After being the farm director, he became a scout for the Phillies.

== See also ==
- List of Major League Baseball annual triples leaders
- List of second-generation Major League Baseball players
