= Bernie Allen =

American baseball player (born 1939)

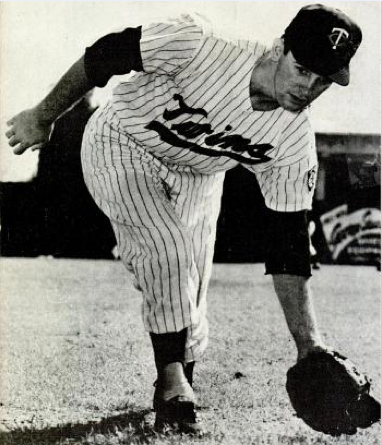
- Allen in 1963.
- Second baseman
- Born: April 16, 1939 (age 87); East Liverpool, Ohio, U.S.
- Batted: Left Threw: Right

MLB debut
- April 10, 1962, for the Minnesota Twins

Last MLB appearance
- September 19, 1973, for the Montreal Expos

MLB statistics
- Batting average: .239
- Home runs: 73
- Runs batted in: 352
- Stats at Baseball Reference

Teams
- Minnesota Twins (1962–1966); Washington Senators (1967–1971); New York Yankees (1972–1973); Montreal Expos (1973)

This is about the baseball player. For the musical project of Travis McCoy called Bernie Allen, see Bernie Allen (band).

Bernard Keith Allen (born April 16, 1939) is an American former Major League Baseball player for the Minnesota Twins, Washington Senators, New York Yankees, and Montreal Expos. At 6' 0" and 185 lbs, Allen was a second-baseman for most of his career; playing over 900 games at the position. By the 1971 season, he was splitting his time between second and third base.

== College career ==
Allen played college baseball for the Boilermakers, where he twice named Team MVP. A winner of six varsity letters, Allen was also a quarterback on the Purdue Boilermakers football team, selected as team MVP in 1960. He platooned at quarterback in 1959, leading the Boilermakers to a 5–2–2 record and six weeks in the Top 15. Earning the starting job in 1960, Allen led the Boilermakers to a record of 4–4–1 (2–4 Big Ten) and wins over No. 12 Notre Dame, No. 3 Ohio State, and No. 1 Minnesota, the consensus national champion at season's end. The Minnesota and Notre Dame victories were both on the road, while the win over Ohio State earned Allen Sports Illustrated's Offensive back of the Week. Purdue spent five weeks in the Top 15 and finished the season at No. 19 in the AP Poll. Allen was selected for the Blue–Gray Game; throwing 3 touchdowns and led the Blue squad to a 35–7 victory over the Gray squad, quarterbacked by Fran Tarkenton. Allen was the leading passer for Purdue during the 1959 and 1960 seasons and was also the team leader in total offense. He was selected as an All-American shortstop in 1961. Allen signed with the Minnesota Twins and played 80 games for Class A Charlotte before being promoted to Major League Baseball.

He spent the 1963 off-season as an assistant football coach under Jack Mollenkopf, where he tutored a young Bob Griese.

In 1999, he was selected for induction in the Purdue Intercollegiate Athletics Hall of Fame.

== Major League career ==
On Opening Day, April 10, 1962, Allen made his debut for the Minnesota Twins at second base. He was put into a position vacated by Billy Martin a week earlier. Allen had one hit, a triple, in four at-bats on opening day. His rookie performance led to a selection to the 1962 Topps All-Star Rookie Roster and finished third in American League Rookie of the Year voting, behind Tom Tresh and Buck Rodgers.

Allen played five seasons for the Twins before he was traded to the Washington Senators with pitcher Camilo Pascual for pitcher Ron Kline. Along with outfielder Elliott Maddox and pitcher Denny McLain, he was among the disgruntled veterans who openly conspired to get manager Ted Williams fired during the 1971 season. Williams referred to the group as The Underminders Club, but their efforts proved to be unsuccessful and he remained with the team for one more season.

After five seasons with the Senators which moved to the Dallas–Fort Worth metroplex to become the Texas Rangers, he was dealt to the New York Yankees for Terry Ley and Gary Jones at the Winter Meetings on December 2, 1971.

Allen played for New York in 1972, backing up second and third base. He played 17 games for the Yankees in 1973 before being purchased by Montreal. The Expos released him two months later.
