= Dick Billings =

American baseball player (born 1942)

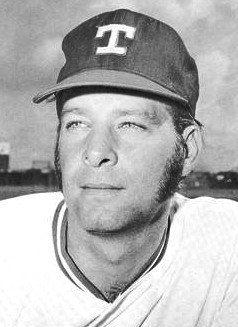
- Billings in 1974
- Catcher / Outfielder
- Born: December 4, 1942 (age 82); Detroit, Michigan, U.S.
- Batted: Right Threw: Right

MLB debut
- September 11, 1968, for the Washington Senators

Last MLB appearance
- June 27, 1975, for the St. Louis Cardinals

MLB statistics
- Batting average: .227
- Home runs: 16
- Runs batted in: 142
- Stats at Baseball Reference

Teams
- Washington Senators / Texas Rangers (1968–1974); St. Louis Cardinals (1974–1975)

Richard Arlin Billings (born December 4, 1942) is an American former professional baseball player. He played in Major League Baseball as a catcher, outfielder and third baseman for the Washington Senators/Texas Rangers (1968–74) and St. Louis Cardinals (1974–75).

== Baseball career ==
Billings was born in Detroit, Michigan where his father was a factory worker. His father moved the family to Troy, Michigan where Billings attended Troy High School. After high school, Billings attended Michigan State University where he played as a third baseman and outfielder for the Michigan State Spartans baseball team. On June 8, 1965, the Washington Senators selected Billings in the 25th round of the 1965 Major League Baseball draft.

Billings played as an outfielder and occasional third baseman in the Senators' minor league system for four years before making his major league debut at the age of 25 as a pinch hitter on September 11, 1968. He had his first appearance as a starting player on September 20, 1968 as a left fielder in a game against the Detroit Tigers.

Billings began the 1969 season with the Senators but, with the team experiencing a weakness at the catcher's position, he agreed to return to the minor leagues in June in order to be converted into a catcher. In 1970, he posted a .305 batting average with 15 home runs and 67 runs batted in while playing for the Denver Bears. His performance earned him a late-season return to the major leagues in September 1970, where he served as a backup catcher behind Paul Casanova.

Billings won the starting catcher's job in July 1971 when Senators manager Ted Williams benched Casanova for weak hitting. Although he led American League catchers with 16 passed balls, he ended the season with a career-high .992 fielding percentage in 116 games.

After the season, the Senators sent Billings to play for the Águilas del Zulia in the Venezuelan Winter Baseball League during the 1971–1972 season to gain additional catching experience. When his manager, Larry Doby was fired midway through the season, the Águilas installed Billings as their player–manager. He then guided the team to its first playoff appearance in team history, with Billings finishing the season as one of the top 10 hitters in the league. His success earned him a return to Venezuela as the Águilas player-manager for the following winter-league season as well.

In 1972 the Senators relocated to the Dallas-Fort Worth area and were renamed the Texas Rangers. Billings started the season in a platoon role alongside left-hand hitting catcher Hal King. King was sent to the minor leagues in July and Billings eventually played in a career-high 133 games. He also posted career-highs with a .254 batting average, 15 doubles, 5 home runs, and led the Rangers with a team-leading 68 runs batted in. On August 13, 1972, Billings produced 5 runs batted in on 4 hits in a 13-4 victory over the Kansas City Royals.

Williams resigned and was replaced by Whitey Herzog as the Rangers' manager, who employed Billings in a platoon role alongside Ken Suarez for the 1973 season. In May, Billings went on the 15-day disabled list. On July 30, 1973, Billings caught Jim Bibby's no-hitter against the Oakland Athletics. Batting as the Rangers' cleanup hitter, Billings' average dropped to .179 with 3 home runs and 32 runs batted in.

With the arrival of new manager Billy Martin in 1974, Billings found himself in a backup role behind defensive standout Jim Sundberg. Billings suffered an ankle injury on April 27 and was placed on the disabled list. He ultimately was sidelined for most of the year with a variety of injuries. In August 1974 his contract was purchased by the St. Louis Cardinals and was sent to the minor leagues to play for the Tulsa Oilers. He was called as a back up to the major leagues late in the season where he appeared in only one game on September 11. Billings began the 1975 season with the Tulsa Oilers before being promoted to the Cardinals in June. After only 3 games with the Cardinals, he was sent back to Tulsa in order to make room on the roster for outfielder Buddy Bradford. Billings retired at the end of the season at the age of 32.

== Career statistics ==
In an eight-year major league career, Billings played in 400 games, accumulating 280 hits in 1,231 at bats for a .227 career batting average along with 16 home runs, 142 runs batted in and an on-base percentage of .281. He had a .984 career fielding percentage in 248 games as a catcher, a .966 fielding percentage in 92 games as an outfielder and, a .906 fielding percentage in 14 games as a third baseman.

== Later life ==
After his playing career Billings obtained his real-estate license and worked as a real-estate broker in Texas and Michigan.
