= Jim Driscoll (baseball) =

American baseball player (born 1944)

- Second baseman / Shortstop
- Born: May 14, 1944 (age 81); Medford, Massachusetts, U.S.
- Batted: Left Threw: Right

MLB debut
- June 17, 1970, for the Oakland Athletics

Last MLB appearance
- May 26, 1972, for the Texas Rangers

MLB statistics
- Batting average: .143
- Hits: 10
- Home runs: 1
- Stats at Baseball Reference

Teams
- Oakland Athletics (1970); Texas Rangers (1972)

James Bernard Driscoll (born May 14, 1944) is an American former Major League Baseball second baseman and shortstop who played in two seasons with the Oakland Athletics and Texas Rangers. He batted left-handed and threw right-handed.

== Playing career ==
Driscoll was drafted by the Milwaukee Braves as an amateur free agent in June 1962. That November, he was drafted by the Kansas City Athletics in the 1962 first-year draft. He was in the A's minor league system when the team moved to Oakland in 1968, and made his major league debut with the A's in 1970, appearing in 21 games for the major league club that season.

He began the 1971 season with the Triple-A Iowa Oaks then was acquired by the Washington Senators during that season. The Senators assigned him to the Triple-A Denver Bears, where he spent the remainder of the 1971 season.

The following season, the Senators moved to Arlington, Texas and became the Texas Rangers. Driscoll appeared in 15 games with the Rangers in their inaugural season in Arlington, but he spent most of the season in Denver. Following the 1972 season he was traded to the Cincinnati Reds along with Hal King in exchange for Jim Merritt. He played in the Reds and later the Houston Astros minor league systems but never appeared in a major league game for either club. He retired after the 1975 season at age 31.
