= Selma High School (Selma, California) =

Public high school in California, United States

Coordinates: 36°34′51″N 119°36′57″W

Location
- 3125 Wright St, Selma, California; United States

Information
- School type: Public
- Established: 1906
- Principal: Nathan Lane
- Teaching staff: 74.60 (FTE)
- Grades: 9 - 12
- Enrollment: 1,742 (2022-23)
- Student to teacher ratio: 24.01
- Colors: Black and Orange
- Mascot: Bear
- Newspaper: The Clarion
- Website: shs.selmausd.org

Selma High School (SHS) is a public high school located in the city of Selma, California, United States. It is part of the Selma Unified School District.

The Selma Unified superintendent is Edward Gomes and the Selma High principal is Nathan Lane.

== Athletics ==
Selma High School competes in the Central Section of the California Interscholastic Federation as a member of the Tri-County Athletic Conference.

- Fall
  - Girls' & Boys' Water Polo
  - Football
  - Volleyball
  - Cross Country
  - Girls' Golf
  - Girls' Tennis
- Winter
  - Boys' Basketball
  - Girls' Basketball
  - Boys' Soccer
  - Girls' Soccer
  - Wrestling
- Spring
  - Baseball
  - Softball
  - Swimming
  - Track & Field
  - Boys' Golf
  - Boys' Tennis

== Alumni ==
- Lloyd Allen, Major League Baseball pitcher
- Jaime Cerda, Major League Baseball pitcher
- Bobby Cox
- Andrea Duran
- Victor Davis Hanson
