= Joe Lovitto =

American baseball player (1951-2001)

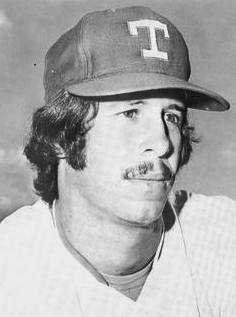
- Lovitto in 1974
- Center fielder
- Born: January 6, 1951; San Pedro, California, U.S.
- Died: May 19, 2001 (aged 50); Arlington, Texas, U.S.
- Batted: Switch Threw: Right

MLB debut
- April 15, 1972, for the Texas Rangers

Last MLB appearance
- September 16, 1975, for the Texas Rangers

MLB statistics
- Batting average: .216
- Home runs: 4
- Runs batted in: 53
- Stats at Baseball Reference

Teams
- Texas Rangers (1972–1975)

Joseph Lovitto, Jr. (January 6, 1951 – May 19, 2001) was an American professional baseball player, a center fielder in Major League Baseball who played for the Texas Rangers (1972–1975). He was a switch-hitter and threw right-handed, standing 6 feet (1.8 m) tall and weighing 185 pounds (84 kg).

== Career ==
A native of San Pedro, California, Lovitto was a competent outfielder with blazing speed who batted over .300 in his minor league career, but never fulfilled expectations at the Major League level. One of his former managers, Billy Martin, wrote, in his autobiography, that Lovitto could have had a great career if not for injuries.

Lovitto started in center field on Opening Day of 1972 in the Texas Rangers' inaugural season. In his rookie year he hit .224 (74-for-330) with 19 runs batted in and 13 stolen bases in 117 games played. Then he lost almost the 1973 season with an injured leg, appearing in only 26 games. The following year he hit .223 in 113 games, but in 1975 was put on the disabled list with a variety of major injuries and appeared in just 50 games. He was traded to the New York Mets for Gene Clines on December 12, 1975, but was released during spring training.

In a four-season career, Lovitto was a .216 hitter (165-for-763) with four home runs, 53 RBI, and 22 stolen bases in 306 games.
