= Terry Ley =

American baseball player (1947–2025)

- Pitcher
- Born: February 21, 1947; Portland, Oregon, U.S.
- Died: August 30, 2025 (aged 78); Prineville, Oregon, U.S.
- Batted: Left Threw: Left

MLB debut
- August 8, 1971, for the New York Yankees

Last MLB appearance
- September 25, 1971, for the New York Yankees

MLB statistics
- Win–loss record: 0-0
- Earned run average: 5.00
- Strikeouts: 7
- Stats at Baseball Reference

Teams
- New York Yankees (1971); Nippon-Ham Fighters (1974–75)

Terrence Richard Ley (/leɪ/ LAY; February 21, 1947 – August 30, 2025) was an American baseball pitcher whose MLB career spanned six games in the 1971 season for the New York Yankees. He was a student of University of Oregon before he was drafted in the 3rd round of the January 1967 draft and was 24 when he made his major league debut on August 20, 1971, for the Yankees.

== Career ==
Ley attended Madison High School in Portland, Oregon. He was initially drafted by the Detroit Tigers in the 30th round of the 1965 Major League Baseball draft, but chose not to sign. He attended the University of Oregon, where he played college baseball for the Oregon Ducks baseball team. After his freshman year, he transferred to Clark College in Vancouver, Washington.

The New York Yankees drafted Ley in the third round of the January Secondary draft in 1967, and he signed. He made his Major League Baseball debut in 1971. Both he and Gary Jones were traded twice on the same day at the Winter Meetings on December 2, 1971. They were first sent from the Yankees to the Texas Rangers for Bernie Allen, then along with Del Unser and Denny Riddleberger to the Cleveland Indians for Roy Foster, Rich Hand, Mike Paul and Ken Suarez.

Ley finished his career playing in Japan, playing for the Nippon-Ham Fighters of Nippon Professional Baseball (NPB) in 1974 and 1975. Ley was the first pitcher in NPB history to issue three balks in an inning, doing so in 1974.

Ley died on August 30, 2025.
