= Rich Hinton =

American baseball player (1947–2025)

- Pitcher
- Born: May 22, 1947; Tucson, Arizona, U.S.
- Died: August 7, 2025 (aged 78); Sarasota, Florida, U.S.
- Batted: Left Threw: Left

MLB debut
- July 17, 1971, for the Chicago White Sox

Last MLB appearance
- September 27, 1979, for the Seattle Mariners

MLB statistics
- Win–loss record: 9–17
- Earned run average: 4.87
- Strikeouts: 152
- Stats at Baseball Reference

Teams
- Chicago White Sox (1971); New York Yankees (1972); Texas Rangers (1972); Chicago White Sox (1975); Cincinnati Reds (1976); Chicago White Sox (1978–1979); Seattle Mariners (1979)

Richard Michael Hinton (May 22, 1947 – August 7, 2025) was an American Major League Baseball pitcher. He pitched parts of six seasons between 1971 and 1979, including three separate stints with the Chicago White Sox.

== Draft history ==
Hinton was originally drafted in the 23rd round in 1965 by the Los Angeles Dodgers, but he did not sign, instead opting to attend the University of Arizona. During his tenure there, he was drafted three more times, but did not sign until the fourth, when he was selected in the 3rd round in 1969 by the White Sox.

== Playing career ==
=== First White Sox stint ===
Hinton advanced fairly quickly to the majors, making his debut in July 1971 against the New York Yankees, pitching a perfect 8th inning in relief of Terry Forster. He would go on to pitch in 18 games that year, including three starts, winning three games and losing four.

=== 1972: Yankees and Rangers ===
Shortly after the 1971 season ended, the White Sox traded Hinton to the team against whom he'd made his debut, the Yankees, in exchange for outfielder Jim Lyttle. He started that season in the minors, coming up to the majors in May. By September, however, he would be out of the Yankees organization, as his contract was purchased by the Texas Rangers. Altogether, Hinton pitched in 12 games in 1972, winning one and losing one.

=== Back to the White Sox ===
The Rangers traded Hinton again the following spring, sending him along with Vince Colbert to the Cleveland Indians for former American League batting champion Alex Johnson. However, the Indians kept Hinton for just one season, during which he never appeared in the majors, before releasing him the following spring. He returned to the White Sox, signing with them less than two weeks after his release, and he spent the 1974 season in the minors again. In 1975, Hinton returned to the majors, pitching in 15 games for Chicago, but he would soon be on the move again.

=== Cincinnati ===
Hinton was dealt along with minor league catcher Jeff Sovern by the White Sox to the Cincinnati Reds for Clay Carroll on December 12, 1975. While Carroll continued on to have a couple more good years, Hinton continued to be on the fringes of the majors, pitching in just twelve games in the majors in 1976 and none in 1977, after which Hinton was granted free agency.

=== White Sox, take three ===
Once again, Hinton found himself in the White Sox organization, and for the first time he would get an extended chance at the majors. He responded by having his best season in 1978, pitching in 29 games, starting four, and pitching a pair of complete games, the only ones of his career. He also picked up his first major league save on June 3 against the Kansas City Royals in support of Ken Kravec. His ERA of 4.02 was also his best since 1972.

==== Final season ====
Hinton made his 1979 major league debut in May, but he wasn't nearly as effective as he'd been the previous year. His ERA with the White Sox went up by two full runs, to 6.04, although he did pick up two more saves. In July, he was traded to the Seattle Mariners for the also-struggling Juan Bernhardt, who would not play in the majors again. Hinton pitched little better for Seattle, finishing the season with a 1–4 record and a 5.86 ERA. He never pitched in the majors again.

== Death ==
Hinton died on August 7, 2025, at the age of 78.
