= Gary Jones (pitcher) =

American baseball player (born 1945)

- Pitcher
- Born: July 12, 1945 (age 81); Huntington Park, California, U.S.
- Batted: Left Threw: Left

MLB debut
- September 25, 1970, for the New York Yankees

Last MLB appearance
- July 6, 1971, for the New York Yankees

MLB statistics
- Earned run average: 7.88
- Record: 0-0
- Strikeouts: 12
- Stats at Baseball Reference

Teams
- New York Yankees (1970–1971)

Gareth Howell "Gary" Jones (born June 12, 1945) is an American former left-handed Major League Baseball relief pitcher who played in 1970 and 1971 for the New York Yankees. The brother of fellow MLB player Steve Jones, Gary was 6 ft 0 in (1.83 m) and 191 pounds.

Prior to playing professional baseball, Jones attended Whittier College. He was signed as an amateur free agent by the Yankees before the 1967 season, and on September 25, 1970, he made his big league debut with them. In his first major league appearance, he faced the Detroit Tigers, pitching two scoreless innings with two hits allowed, one walk, and two strikeouts (Gene Lamont and Norm Cash). He appeared in a total of two games that season, allowing three hits in two innings of work. His ERA was 0.00.

He appeared in 12 games in 1971, allowing 14 earned runs in 14 innings for a 9.00 ERA. He made his final big league appearance on July 6. Both he and Terry Ley were traded twice on the same day at the Winter Meetings on December 2, 1971. They were first sent from the Yankees to the Texas Rangers for Bernie Allen, then along with Del Unser and Denny Riddleberger to the Cleveland Indians for Roy Foster, Rich Hand, Mike Paul and Ken Suarez. However, he never played in the majors for the Indians, instead pitching for their Triple-A affiliate, the Portland Beavers, in 1972 to finish his professional baseball career.
