= Winter Meetings =

Meeting of Major League baseball executives to discuss off-season business

Representatives of all 30 Major League Baseball teams and their 120 Minor League Baseball affiliates convene for four days each December in the Winter Meetings to discuss league business and conduct off-season trades and transactions. Attendees include league executives, team owners, general managers, team scouts, visitors from baseball-playing countries, trade show exhibitors, and people seeking employment with minor league organizations. The Rule 5 draft, in which minor league players who are not on a team's 40-man roster can be drafted by a major league team, is held on the last day of the meetings.

== History ==
The tradition of baseball holding off-season meetings during December dates back to 1876, the first offseason of the National League. At the 1876 meetings, William Hulbert was selected to be the league's president, and two teams (the New York Mutuals and Philadelphia Athletics) were expelled from the league for failing to play all their scheduled games; they had refused to make their final road trip of the season. The Winter Meetings became an annual event in 1901.

- 1927 – New York City
- 1928 – New York City
- 1929 – New York City
- 1930 – New York City
- 1931 – Chicago
- 1932 – New York City
- 1933 – Chicago
- 1934 – New York City
- 1935 – Chicago
- 1936 – New York City
- 1937 – Chicago
- 1938 – New York City
- 1939 – Cincinnati
- 1940 – Chicago
- 1941 – Chicago
- 1942 – Chicago
- 1943 – New York City
- 1944 – New York City
- 1945 – Chicago
- 1946 – Los Angeles
- 1947 – Miami
- 1948 – Chicago
- 1949 – New York City
- 1950 – St. Petersburg
- 1951 – Columbus
- 1952 – Phoenix
- 1953 – Atlanta
- 1954 – Houston
- 1955 – Columbus
- 1956 – Jacksonville
- 1957 – Colorado Springs
- 1958 – Washington, D.C.
- 1959 – St. Petersburg
- 1960 – Louisville
- 1961 – Tampa
- 1962 – Rochester
- 1963 – San Diego
- 1964 – Houston
- 1965 – Fort Lauderdale
- 1966 – Columbus
- 1967 – Mexico City
- 1968 – San Francisco
- 1969 – Ft. Lauderdale
- 1970 – Los Angeles
- 1971 – Phoenix
- 1972 – Honolulu
- 1973 – Houston
- 1974 – New Orleans
- 1975 – Hollywood, Florida
- 1976 – Los Angeles
- 1977 – Honolulu
- 1978 – Orlando
- 1979 – Toronto
- 1980 – Dallas
- 1981 – Hollywood
- 1982 – Honolulu
- 1983 – Nashville
- 1984 – Houston
- 1985 – San Diego
- 1986 – Hollywood
- 1987 – Dallas
- 1988 – Atlanta
- 1989 – Nashville
- 1990 – Rosemont, Illinois
- 1991 – Miami Beach
- 1992 – Louisville
- 1993 – Atlanta
- 1994 – Dallas
- 1995 – Los Angeles
- 1996 – Boston
- 1997 – New Orleans
- 1998 – Nashville
- 1999 – Anaheim
- 2000 – Dallas
- 2001 – Boston
- 2002 – Nashville
- 2003 – New Orleans
- 2004 – Anaheim
- 2005 – Dallas
- 2006 – Bay Lake, Florida (Disney World)
- 2007 – Nashville
- 2008 – Paradise, Nevada
- 2009 – Indianapolis
- 2010 – Bay Lake
- 2011 – Dallas
- 2012 – Nashville
- 2013 – Bay Lake
- 2014 – San Diego
- 2015 – Nashville
- 2016 – National Harbor, Maryland
- 2017 – Bay Lake
- 2018 – Paradise
- 2019 – San Diego
- 2020 – Virtual due to the COVID-19 pandemic, originally planned for Dallas
- 2021 – Canceled due to the 2021 MLB lockout, originally planned for Bay Lake
- 2022 – San Diego
- 2023 – Nashville
- 2024 – Dallas
- 2025 – Lake Buena Vista, Florida
- 2026 – San Diego

== Attendees ==
The Winter Meetings attract several thousand participants; in 2014 organizers anticipated 3,000 attendees. These include team owners, field managers, team scouts, players' agents, lawyers and accountants specializing in baseball, and visitors from baseball-playing countries. While it is rare for players who are under contract to attend, free agents often do come to take advantage of the opportunity to introduce themselves to many teams. At the 2014 Winter Meetings in San Diego, an estimated 750 media personnel received press passes.

Receptions are held nightly by each of the 30 major league teams for their minor league affiliates. A luncheon is also held for major league managers and baseball reporters.

== Player trades and signings ==
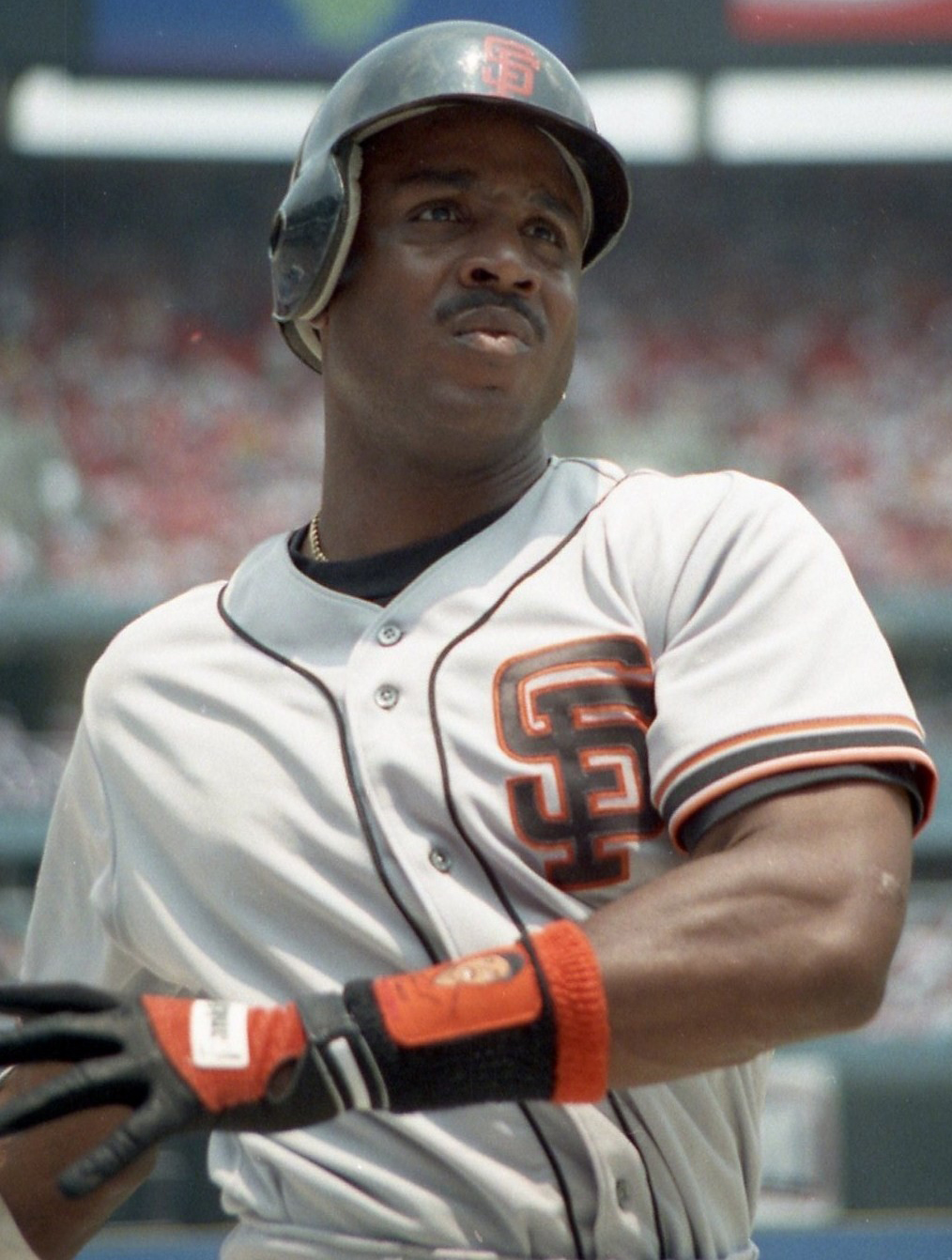
Barry Bonds playing for the San Francisco Giants in 1993

With all the principals in one place, the Winter Meetings are typically the site of player trades and free-agent signings. However, the informal meetings that used to take place in hotel lobbies up until the end of the 20th century have been replaced by texting and emailing; most interactions take place in the privacy of suites due to the preponderance of media personnel and fans converging on the site.

Among the notable trades and signings that have been made at the Winter Meetings are:

- At the 1975 Winter Meetings in Fort Lauderdale, new Chicago White Sox owner Bill Veeck sat at a table in the lobby behind a sign that said "Open for Business". During the course of the meetings, Veeck negotiated six trades involving 22 players.
- At the 1988 Winter Meetings in Atlanta, the Texas Rangers closed three trades involving 15 players and signed free agent pitcher Nolan Ryan.
- At the 1992 Winter Meetings in Louisville, first-time free agent Barry Bonds was signed by the San Francisco Giants for six years and $43 million. Bonds personally negotiated to have a hotel suite at his disposal during road games.
- On the last day of the 2011 Winter Meetings in Dallas, Albert Pujols, who had won a World Series ring with the St. Louis Cardinals that fall, inked a 10-year, $250 million deal with the Los Angeles Angels.
- In the space of 24 hours at the 2014 Winter Meetings in San Diego, the Los Angeles Dodgers concluded six transactions with four teams, involving 19 players and a free agent.
- On consecutive days during the 2019 Winter Meetings in San Diego, Gerrit Cole signed a nine-year, $324 million deal with the New York Yankees, followed by Anthony Rendon agreeing to a seven-year, $245 million contract with the Los Angeles Angels the following evening.

== Other events ==
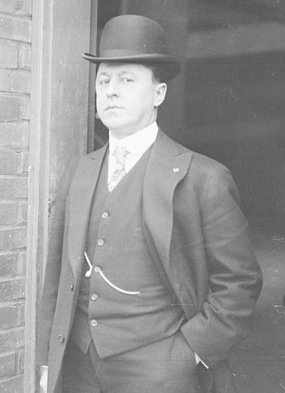
Pants Rowland, winner of the first "King of Baseball" award in 1951.

Concurrent with the Winter Meetings, a trade show featuring close to 300 vendors of baseball equipment, services, and promotions takes place. Another annual event is the Professional Baseball Employment Opportunities Job Fair, during which recent college graduates seeking internships and employment with minor league organizations schedule on-site interviews. The month of December is considered "the height of baseball hiring season", as 400 to 500 workers are hired each year.

From 1951 to 2019, the "King of Baseball" title was awarded to a minor league veteran at the Winter Meetings banquet. With the 2020 minor-league season having been canceled due to COVID-19, the award was not presented in that year, and it was discontinued when MLB took over the minor leagues in 2021.

Several events associated with the Hall of Fame also take place at the Winter Meetings:

- The voting bodies that superseded the Veterans Committee, which are now the only bodies that elect long-retired players and non-playing personnel to the Hall, meet and vote.
- The winner of the Ford C. Frick Award for excellence in broadcasting is announced.
- The Baseball Writers' Association of America conducts its annual meeting and announces the recipient of its BBWAA Career Excellence Award (historically the J. G. Taylor Spink Award) for excellence in baseball writing. Both the Frick and Career Excellence Awards are presented as part of the Hall of Fame's annual induction festivities.
- The Scout of the Year award is presented at a special banquet.

== Notes ==
=== Sources ===
- Carroll, Jeff (2007). Sam Rice: A Biography of the Washington Senators Hall of Famer. McFarland. ISBN 978-0786431199.
- Geltner, Ted (2012). Last King of the Sports Page: The Life and Career of Jim Murray. University of Missouri Press. p. 203. ISBN 978-0826272737.
- Gorman, Lou (2007). High and Inside: My Life in the Front Offices of Baseball. McFarland. p. 8. ISBN 978-0786431632.
- Peden, Buck (2011). Baseball, Golf, Wars, Women & Puppies: An Autobiography. AuthorHouse. ISBN 978-1456758431.
- Sandoval, Jim; Nowlin, Bill, eds. (2011). Can He Play? A look at baseball scouts and their profession. Society for American Baseball Research. ISBN 978-1933599236.
- Solomon, Arthur P.; Freeman, Allyn I. (2012). Making It in the Minors: A Team Owner's Lessons in the Business of Baseball. McFarland. ISBN 978-0786492978.
- Sypher, Beverly Davenport, ed. (1990). Case Studies in Organizational Communication (Revised ed.). Guilford Press. ISBN 0898622875.
