= 1970 Washington Senators season =

1970 Washington Senators
- League: American League
- Division: East
- Ballpark: RFK Stadium
- City: Washington, D.C.
- Record: 70–92 (.432)
- League place: 6th
- Owners: Bob Short
- Managers: Ted Williams
- Television: WTOP
- Radio: WWDC (FM) (Ron Menchine, Shelby Whitfield, Warner Wolf)

The 1970 Washington Senators season involved the Senators finishing sixth in the American League East with a record of 70 wins and 92 losses. This was the franchise's penultimate season in Washington, D.C.

== Offseason ==
- December 5, 1969: Dennis Higgins and Barry Moore were traded by the Senators to the Cleveland Indians for Horacio Piña, Ron Law and Dave Nelson.
- December 31, 1969: John Roseboro was signed as a free agent by the Senators.
- January 17, 1970: Bill Madlock was drafted by the Senators in the 5th round of the 1970 Major League Baseball draft (secondary phase). Player signed May 25, 1970.
- March 21, 1970: Brant Alyea was traded by the Senators to the Minnesota Twins for Joe Grzenda and Charley Walters.
- March 30, 1970: Pedro Ramos was signed as a free agent by the Senators.

== Regular season ==
=== Opening Day starters ===
- Hank Allen
- Dick Bosman
- Ed Brinkman
- Paul Casanova
- Mike Epstein
- Frank Howard
- Ken McMullen
- Dave Nelson
- Del Unser

=== Season standings ===
AL East
Team	W	L	Pct.	GB	Home	Road
Baltimore Orioles	108	54	.667	—	59‍–‍22	49‍–‍32
New York Yankees	93	69	.574	15	53‍–‍28	40‍–‍41
Boston Red Sox	87	75	.537	21	52‍–‍29	35‍–‍46
Detroit Tigers	79	83	.488	29	42‍–‍39	37‍–‍44
Cleveland Indians	76	86	.469	32	43‍–‍38	33‍–‍48
Washington Senators	70	92	.432	38	40‍–‍41	30‍–‍51

=== Record vs. opponents ===
1970 American League record Sources:
Team	BAL	BOS	CAL	CWS	CLE	DET	KC	MIL	MIN	NYY	OAK	WAS
Baltimore	—	13–5	7–5	9–3	14–4	11–7	12–0	7–5	5–7	11–7	7–5	12–6
Boston	5–13	—	5–7	8–4	12–6	9–9	7–5	5–7	7–5	10–8	7–5	12–6
California	5–7	7–5	—	12–6	6–6	6–6	10–8	12–6	8–10	5–7	8–10	7–5
Chicago	3–9	4–8	6–12	—	6–6	6–6	7–11	7–11	6–12	5–7	2–16	4–8
Cleveland	4–14	6–12	6–6	6–6	—	7–11	8–4	7–5	6–6	8–10	7–5	11–7
Detroit	7–11	9–9	6–6	6–6	11–7	—	6–6	8–4	4–8	7–11	6–6	9–9
Kansas City	0–12	5–7	8–10	11–7	4–8	6–6	—	12–6	5–13	1–11	7–11	6–6
Milwaukee	5–7	7–5	6–12	11–7	5–7	4–8	6–12	—	5–13	3–9–1	8–10	5–7
Minnesota	7–5	5–7	10–8	12–6	6–6	8–4	13–5	13–5	—	5–7	13–5	6–6
New York	7–11	8–10	7–5	7–5	10–8	11–7	11–1	9–3–1	7–5	—	6–6	10–8
Oakland	5–7	5–7	10–8	16–2	5–7	6–6	11–7	10–8	5–13	6–6	—	10–2
Washington	6–12	6–12	5–7	8–4	7–11	9–9	6–6	7–5	6–6	8–10	2–10	—

=== Notable transactions ===
- April 27, 1970: Pedro Ramos was released by the Senators.
- April 27, 1970: Ken McMullen was traded by the Senators to the California Angels for Aurelio Rodríguez and Rick Reichardt.
- May 11, 1970: Hank Allen and Ron Theobald were traded by the Senators to the Milwaukee Brewers for Wayne Comer.
- June 4, 1970: 1970 Major League Baseball draft
  - Rick Waits was drafted by the Senators in the 5th round.
  - Bruce Sutter was drafted by the Senators in the 21st round, but did not sign.
- August 19, 1970: John Roseboro was released by the Senators.
- September 11, 1970: Lee Maye was selected off waivers from the Senators by the Chicago White Sox.

=== Roster ===
1970 Washington Senators
Roster
Pitchers: 27 Dick Bosman; 23 Jackie Brown; 34 George Brunet; 19 Cisco Carlos; 20 Joe Coleman; 29 Casey Cox; 22 Jan Dukes; 18 Bill Gogolewski; 19,31 Joe Grzenda; 16 Jim Hannan; 23 Bob Humphreys; 32 Darold Knowles; 28 Horacio Piña; 17 Pedro Ramos; 19 Denny Riddleberger; 21 Jim Shellenback; 18 Dick Such	Catchers: 35 Dick Billings; 8 Paul Casanova; 10 Jim French; 13 John Roseboro; Infielders: 7 Bernie Allen; 11 Ed Brinkman; 1 Tim Cullen; 6 Mike Epstein; 2 Ken McMullen; 14 Dave Nelson; 5 Dick Nen; 2 Aurelio Rodríguez	Outfielders: 35 Hank Allen; 20 Jeff Burroughs; 12 Wayne Comer; 24 Greg Goossen; 4 Tom Grieve; 33 Frank Howard; 5 Lee Maye; 3 Rick Reichardt; 36 Ed Stroud; 30 Del Unser; Other batters: 4 Larry Biittner	Manager: 9 Ted Williams; Coaches: 40 Joe Camacho; 42 Nellie Fox; 41 Sid Hudson; 43 George Susce; 44 Wayne Terwilliger; 45 Del Wilber

== Player stats ==
=== Batting ===
==== Starters by position ====
Note: Pos = Position; G = Games played; AB = At bats; H = Hits; Avg. = Batting average; HR = Home runs; RBI = Runs batted in

Pos	Player	G	AB	H	Avg.	HR	RBI
C	Paul Casanova	104	328	75	.229	6	30
1B	Mike Epstein	140	430	110	.256	20	56
2B	Tim Cullen	123	262	56	.214	1	18
SS	Ed Brinkman	158	625	164	.262	1	40
3B	Aurelio Rodríguez	142	547	135	.247	19	76
LF	Frank Howard	161	566	160	.283	44	126
CF	Ed Stroud	129	433	115	.266	5	32
RF	Lee Maye	96	255	67	.263	7	30

==== Other batters ====
Note: G = Games played; AB = At bats; H = Hits; Avg. = Batting average; HR = Home runs; RBI = Runs batted in

Player	G	AB	H	Avg.	HR	RBI
Del Unser	119	322	83	.258	5	30
Rick Reichardt	107	277	70	.253	15	46
Bernie Allen	104	261	61	.234	8	29
Jim French	69	166	35	.211	1	13
Wayne Comer	77	129	30	.233	0	8
Tom Grieve	47	116	23	.198	3	10
Dave Nelson	47	107	17	.159	0	4
John Roseboro	46	86	20	.233	1	6
Ken McMullen	15	59	12	.203	0	3
Hank Allen	22	38	8	.211	0	4
Greg Goossen	21	36	8	.222	0	1
Dick Billings	11	24	6	.250	1	1
Jeff Burroughs	6	12	2	.167	0	1
Dick Nen	6	5	1	.200	0	0
Larry Biittner	2	2	0	.000	0	0

=== Pitching ===
==== Starting pitchers ====
Note: G = Games pitched; IP = Innings pitched; W = Wins; L = Losses; ERA = Earned run average; SO = Strikeouts

Player	G	IP	W	L	ERA	SO
Dick Bosman	36	230.2	16	12	3.00	134
Joe Coleman	39	218.2	8	12	3.58	152
Casey Cox	37	192.1	8	12	4.45	68
George Brunet	24	118.0	8	6	4.42	67

==== Other pitchers ====
Note: G = Games pitched; IP = Innings pitched; W = Wins; L = Losses; ERA = Earned run average; SO = Strikeouts

Player	G	IP	W	L	ERA	SO
Jim Hannan	42	128.0	9	11	4.01	61
Jim Shellenback	39	117.1	6	7	3.68	57
Jackie Brown	24	57.0	2	2	3.95	47
Dick Such	21	50.0	1	5	7.56	41
Bill Gogolewski	8	33.2	2	2	4.81	19

==== Relief pitchers ====
Note: G = Games pitched; W = Wins; L = Losses; SV = Saves; ERA = Earned run average; SO = Strikeouts

Player	G	W	L	SV	ERA	SO
Darold Knowles	71	2	14	27	2.07	71
Horacio Piña	61	5	3	6	2.79	41
Joe Grzenda	49	3	6	6	5.00	38
Denny Riddleberger	8	0	0	0	0.96	5
Jan Dukes	5	0	0	0	2.70	4
Bob Humphreys	5	0	0	0	1.35	6
Cisco Carlos	5	0	0	0	1.50	2
Pedro Ramos	4	0	0	0	7.56	10

== Awards and honors ==
- Frank Howard, A.L. Home Run Champion 1970

All-Star Game

== Farm system ==
Level	Team	League	Manager
AAA	Denver Bears	American Association	Whitey Kurowski and Dick Gernert
AA	Pittsfield Senators	Eastern League	Dick Gernert and Joe Klein
A	Burlington Senators	Carolina League	Joe Klein and Whitey Kurowski
A	Anderson Senators	Western Carolinas League	Frank Gable
A-Short Season	Geneva Senators	New York–Penn League	Bill Haywood
