= 1969 Washington Senators season =

1969 Washington Senators
- League: American League
- Division: East
- Ballpark: RFK Stadium
- City: Washington, D.C.
- Record: 86–76 (.531)
- Divisional place: 4th
- Owners: Bob Short
- Managers: Ted Williams
- Television: WTOP
- Radio: WWDC (FM) (Ron Menchine, Shelby Whitfield, Warner Wolf)

The 1969 Washington Senators season involved the Senators finishing fourth in the newly established American League East with a record of 86 wins and 76 losses, their first winning season in franchise history, and only in Washington.

== Offseason ==
- January 8, 1969: John Orsino was purchased from the Senators by the New York Yankees.

== Regular season ==
The year 1969 was a turning point in Washington sports history. The Senators named Ted Williams as manager. The Washington Redskins hired Vince Lombardi as Head Coach and he had brought a winning attitude to the nation's capital. In the same year, the nearby University of Maryland had hired Lefty Driesell to coach basketball. It marked a renaissance in sports interest in America's most transient of cities.

The hiring of Ted Williams sparked at least increased curiosity in the team. Williams' fanatical approach to hitting helped improve the Senators offense considerably, and inspired the team to its one and only winning season during its 11-year stay in Washington. The Senators won 86 games, 21 more than in 1968, and improved from last place in the ten-team 1968 American League to one game out of third in the new AL East division. For this remarkable turnaround, Williams was voted American League Manager of the Year. As a result, attendance at RFK Stadium improved to over 900,000, the highest attendance for the "new" Senators and, at the time, the highest in Washington's baseball history.

=== Season standings ===
AL East
Team	W	L	Pct.	GB	Home	Road
Baltimore Orioles	109	53	.673	—	60‍–‍21	49‍–‍32
Detroit Tigers	90	72	.556	19	46‍–‍35	44‍–‍37
Boston Red Sox	87	75	.537	22	46‍–‍35	41‍–‍40
Washington Senators	86	76	.531	23	47‍–‍34	39‍–‍42
New York Yankees	80	81	.497	28½	48‍–‍32	32‍–‍49
Cleveland Indians	62	99	.385	46½	33‍–‍48	29‍–‍51

=== Record vs. opponents ===
1969 American League records Sources:
Team	BAL	BOS	CAL	CWS	CLE	DET	KC	MIN	NYY	OAK	SEA	WAS
Baltimore	—	10–8	6–6	9–3	13–5	11–7	11–1	8–4	11–7	8–4	9–3	13–5
Boston	8–10	—	8–4	5–7	12–6	10–8	10–2	7–5	11–7	4–8	6–6	6–12
California	6–6	4–8	—	9–9	8–4	5–7	9–9	7–11	3–9	6–12	9–9–1	5–7
Chicago	3–9	7–5	9–9	—	8–4	3–9	8–10	5–13	3–9	8–10	10–8	4–8
Cleveland	5–13	6–12	4–8	4–8	—	7–11	7–5	5–7	9–8	5–7	7–5	3–15
Detroit	7–11	8–10	7–5	9–3	11–7	—	8–4	6–6	10–8	7–5	10–2	7–11
Kansas City	1–11	2–10	9–9	10–8	5–7	4–8	—	8–10	5–7–1	8–10	10–8	7–5
Minnesota	4–8	5–7	11–7	13–5	7–5	6–6	10–8	—	10–2	13–5	12–6	6–6
New York	7–11	7–11	9–3	9–3	8–9	8–10	7–5–1	2–10	—	6–6	7–5	10–8
Oakland	4–8	8–4	12–6	10–8	7–5	5–7	10–8	5–13	6–6	—	13–5	8–4
Seattle	3–9	6–6	9–9–1	8–10	5–7	2–10	8–10	6–12	5–7	5–13	—	7–5
Washington	5–13	12–6	7–5	8–4	15–3	11–7	5–7	6–6	8–10	4–8	5–7	—

=== Opening Day starters ===
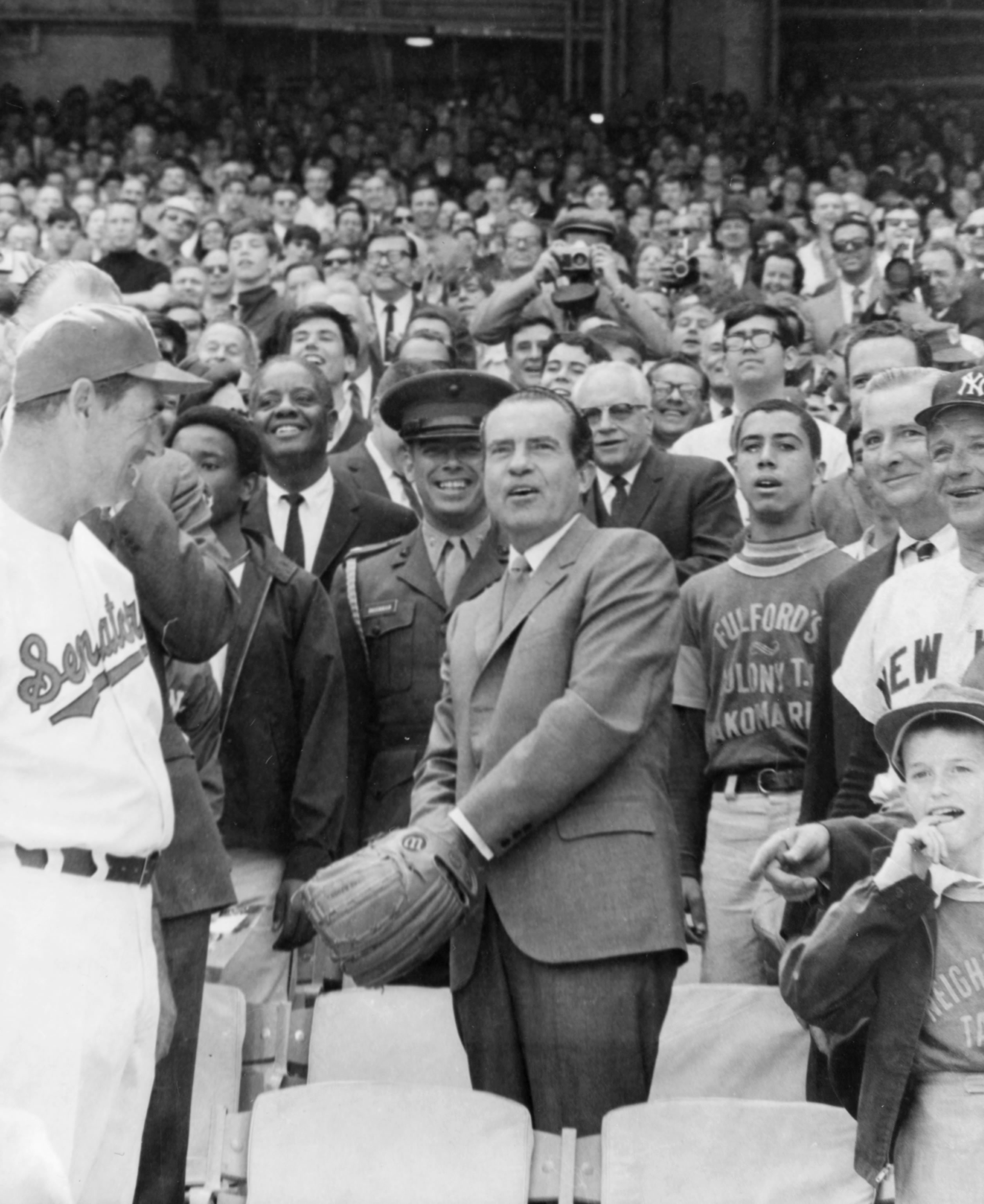
President Richard Nixon throwing out the first pitch of the Senators' season in April 1969; manager Ted Williams is at left; owner Bob Short at right.

- CF Del Unser
- RF Ed Stroud
- LF Frank Howard
- 1B Mike Epstein
- 3B Ken McMullen
- SS Ed Brinkman
- 2B Tim Cullen
- C Paul Casanova
- P Camilo Pascual

=== Notable transactions ===
- June 5, 1969: 1969 Major League Baseball draft
  - Dave Moates was drafted by the Senators in the 4th round.
  - Dave Criscione was drafted by the Senators in the 5th round.
- June 20, 1969: Bill Denehy and cash was traded by the Senators to the Cleveland Indians for Lee Maye.

=== Roster ===
1969 Washington Senators
Roster
Pitchers: 37 Dave Baldwin; 24 Frank Bertaina; 27 Dick Bosman; 31 Cisco Carlos; 20 Joe Coleman; 29 Casey Cox; 22 Jan Dukes; 16 Jim Hannan; 28 Dennis Higgins; 23 Bob Humphreys; 32 Darold Knowles; 22 Frank Kreutzer; 21,24 Jim Miles; 25 Barry Moore; 17 Camilo Pascual; 21 Jim Shellenback	Catchers: 12 Doug Camilli; 8 Paul Casanova; 10 Jim French; Infielders: 7 Bernie Allen; 11 Ed Brinkman; 1 Tim Cullen; 6 Mike Epstein; 17 Toby Harrah; 5 Gary Holman; 2 Ken McMullen; 15 Zoilo Versalles	Outfielders: 35 Hank Allen; 3 Brant Alyea; 16,31 Dick Billings; 31 Sam Bowens; 33 Frank Howard; 5 Lee Maye; 14 Dick Smith; 36 Ed Stroud; 30 Del Unser	Manager: 9 Ted Williams; Coaches: 40 Joe Camacho; 12 Doug Camilli; 42 Nellie Fox; 41 Sid Hudson; 43 George Susce; 44 Wayne Terwilliger

== Game log ==
=== Regular season ===
1969 regular season game log: 86–76 (Home: 47–34; Away: 39–42)
April: 12–11 (Home: 5–5; Away: 7–6)

#	Date	Time (ET)	Opponent	Score	Win	Loss	Save	Time of Game	Attendance	Record	Box/ Streak
1	April 7	1:30 p.m. EST	Yankees	L 4–8	Stottlemyre (1–0)	**Pascual** (0–1)	–	2:47	45,113	0–1	L1
2	April 9	8:05 p.m. EST	Yankees	**W** 6–4	**Coleman** (1–0)	Bahnsen (0–1)	–	2:00	15,162	1–1	W1
3	April 10	1:30 p.m. EST	Yankees	**W** 9–6	**Hannan** (1–0)	Peterson (0–1)	**Higgins** (1)	2:33	3,971	2–1	W2
4	April 11	8:00 p.m. EST	@ Orioles	**W** 4–0	**Moore** (1–0)	Hardin (0–1)	**Higgins** (2)	2:15	8,415	3–1	W3
5	April 12	2:15 p.m. EST	@ Orioles	L 0–9	McNally (1–0)	**Pascual** (0–2)	–	2:16	6,379	3–2	L1
6	April 13	2:00 p.m. EST	@ Orioles	L 0–2	Palmer (1–0)	**Coleman** (1–1)	–	2:03	–	3–3	L2
7	April 13	4:38 p.m. EST	@ Orioles	L 0–9	Phoebus (1–0)	**Bosman** (0–1)	–	2:07	20,483	3–4	L3
8	April 15	2:00 p.m. EST	@ Yankees	L 2–8	Peterson (1–1)	**Bertaina** (0–1)	–	2:32	13,889	3–5	L4
–	April 16		@ Yankees	**Postponed (Rain)** (Makeup date: April 17)							
9	April 17	1:00 p.m. EST	@ Yankees	L 3–7 (10)	Stottlemyre (3–0)	**Higgins** (0–1)	–	2:28	–	3–6	L5
10	April 17	4:03 p.m. EST	@ Yankees	**W** 5–2	**Moore** (2–0)	Bahnsen (0–3)	**Higgins** (3)	2:17	6,883	4–6	W1
11	April 18	8:05 p.m. EST	Orioles	L 0–6	Phoebus (2–0)	**Coleman** (1–2)	–	2:27	4,457	4–7	L1
12	April 19	2:15 p.m. EST	Orioles	**W** 7–5	**Bosman** (1–1)	Cuellar (0–2)	**Higgins** (4)	2:20	5,495	5–7	W1
13	April 20	1:00 p.m. EST	Orioles	L 1–2	McNally (2–0)	**Hannan** (1–1)	Watt (2)	2:52	–	5–8	L1
14	April 20	4:27 p.m. EST	Orioles	**W** 5–2	**Bertaina** (1–1)	Hardin (0–2)	**Humphreys** (1)	2:19	18,055	6–8	W1
15	April 21	8:05 p.m. EST	Tigers	L 0–2	Sparma (2–0)	**Moore** (2–1)	–	2:15	3,813	6–9	L1
16	April 22	8:05 p.m. EST	Tigers	L 2–4	Hiller (1–0)	**Pascual** (0–3)	McMahon (3)	2:48	4,922	6–10	L2
–	April 24		@ Red Sox	**Postponed (Rain)** (Makeup date: July 5)							
21	April 28	8:00 p.m. EDT	@ Tigers	**W** 6–1	**Pascual** (1–3)	Wilson (1–3)	**Bosman** (1)	2:39	7,353	11–10	W5
22	April 29	8:00 p.m. EDT	@ Tigers	L 4–5	Radatz (1–0)	**Bertaina** (1–2)	–	2:24	6,986	11–11	L1

May: 12–16 (Home: 9–7; Away: 3–9)

#	Date	Time (ET)	Opponent	Score	Win	Loss	Save	Time of Game	Attendance	Record	Box/ Streak

June: 14–12 (Home: 6–7; Away: 8–5)

#	Date	Time (ET)	Opponent	Score	Win	Loss	Save	Time of Game	Attendance	Record	Box/ Streak
–	June 15		Angels	**Postponed (Rain)** (Makeup date: September 2)							
64	June 17	8:05 p.m. EDT	Orioles	L 1–5	Cuellar (0–2)	**Shellenback** (1–2)	–	2:26	22,134	31–33	L2
65	June 18	8:05 p.m. EDT	Orioles	L 1–3	Hardin (3–3)	**Moore** (5–2)	Hall (2)	2:11	10,420	31–34	L3
66	June 19	8:05 p.m. EDT	Orioles	L 0–2	McNally (10–0)	**Higgins** (4–7)	–	2:04	13,376	31–35	L4
67	June 20	8:00 p.m. EDT	@ Tigers	**W** 7–2 (10)	**Knowles** (3–0)	McMahon (1–4)	–	3:07	27,725	32–35	W1
68	June 21	1:15 p.m. EDT	@ Tigers	L 5–9	Lolich (8–1)	**Humphreys** (1–2)	–	2:31	25,340	32–36	L1
69	June 22	1:30 p.m. EDT	@ Tigers	**W** 9–4	**Higgins** (5–7)	Dobson (2–5)	–	2:51	–	33–36	W1
70	June 22	4:56 p.m. EDT	@ Tigers	**W** 9–5 (6)	**Moore** (6–2)	Sparma (4–3)	–	1:51	52,721	34–36	W2
71	June 23	8:00 p.m. EDT	@ Orioles	L 3–5	Palmer (9–2)	**Knowles** (3–1)	Richert (6)	1:57	7,830	34–37	L1
72	June 24	8:00 p.m. EDT	@ Orioles	L 3–6 (11)	Hall (4–2)	**Shellenback** (1–3)	–	3:06	14,763	34–38	L2
73	June 25	8:00 p.m. EDT	@ Orioles	**W** 11–8	**Humphreys** (2–2)	Hardin (3–4)	**Knowles** (2)	2:41	11,130	35–38	W1
–	June 30		@ Indians	**Postponed (Rain)** (Makeup date: July 1)							

July: 16–15 (Home: 4–3; Away: 12–12)

#	Date	Time (ET)	Opponent	Score	Win	Loss	Save	Time of Game	Attendance	Record	Box/ Streak
90	July 11	8:05 p.m. EDT	Yankees	L 3–4	Stottlemyre (13–6)	**Moore** (7–4)	–	2:13	22,254	46–44	L1
91	July 12	2:15 p.m. EDT	Yankees	L 1–3	Burbach (6–7)	**Bosman** (6–3)	Aker (7)	2:39	17,818	46–45	L2
92	July 13	1:00 p.m. EDT	Yankees	**W** 5–4	**Cox** (7–1)	Peterson (9–11)	–	2:19	–	47–45	W1
93	July 13	3:54 p.m. EDT	Yankees	**W** 10–1	**Shellenback** (2–4)	Downing (1–3)	–	2:22	31,700	48–45	W2
94	July 14	8:05 p.m. EDT	Tigers	**W** 3–0	**Coleman** (6–7)	Sparma (5–7)	–	2:50	23,831	49–45	W3
95	July 15	8:05 p.m. EDT	Tigers	**W** 7–3	**Moore** (8–4)	Hiller (2–3)	**Baldwin** (3)	2:28	16,122	50–45	W4
96	July 16	8:05 p.m. EDT	Tigers	L 0–3	Lolich (8–1)	**Bosman** (6–4)	–	2:27	21,568	50–46	L1
97	July 17	8:05 p.m. EDT	Tigers	L 3–4	Wilson (8–7)	**Cox** (7–2)	McMahon (8)	2:31	24,701	50–47	L2
98	July 18	8:00 p.m. EDT	@ Yankees	L 0–5	Peterson (10–11)	**Shellenback** (2–5)	–	2:13	11,002	50–48	L3
99	July 19	5:00 p.m. EDT	@ Yankees	L 0–9	Stottlemyre (14–7)	**Moore** (8–5)	–	2:12	–	50–49	L4
100	July 19	7:47 p.m. EDT	@ Yankees	**W** 4–0	**Coleman** (7–7)	Bahnsen (5–11)	–	2:37	16,547	51–49	W1
101	July 20	2:00 p.m. EDT	@ Yankees	L 2–3 (11)	Aker (5–2)	**Cox** (7–3)	–	3:17	32,933	51–50	L1
**40th All-Star Game in Washington, DC**

August: 14–11 (Home: 8–6; Away: 6–5)

#	Date	Time (ET)	Opponent	Score	Win	Loss	Save	Time of Game	Attendance	Record	Box/ Streak

September: 17–11 (Home: 12–4; Away: 5–7)

#	Date	Time (ET)	Opponent	Score	Win	Loss	Save	Time of Game	Attendance	Record	Box/ Streak
–	September 8		@ Orioles	**Postponed (Rain)** (Makeup date: September 9)							
141	September 9	8:00 p.m. EDT	@ Orioles	L 1–6	Cuellar (21–10)	**Carlos** (5–4)	–	2:25	–	72–69	L1
142	September 9	8:00 p.m. EDT	@ Orioles	L 2–3	Phoebus (13–6)	**Coleman** (10–13)	Watt (14)	2:39	10,747	72–70	L2
143	September 10	8:05 p.m. EDT	Yankees	**W** 6–1	**Bosman** (12–5)	Stottlemyre (18–13)	–	2:10	6,016	73–70	W1
144	September 11	8:05 p.m. EDT	Yankees	**W** 7–3	**Hannan** (6–5)	Bahnsen (9–14)	**Knowles** (12)	2:10	5,389	74–70	W2
145	September 12	8:05 p.m. EDT	Tigers	**W** 4–3	**Cox** (12–5)	Wilson (12–10)	–	2:17	9,398	75–70	W3
146	September 13	2:15 p.m. EDT	Tigers	**W** 11–6	**Knowles** (1–2)	Timmermann (3–3)	–	2:56	9,921	76–70	W4
147	September 14	1:30 p.m. EDT	Tigers	L 4–7 (12)	Dobson (5–10)	**Dukes** (0–1)	Hiller (4)	3:58	12,114	76–71	L1
148	September 15	8:05 p.m. EDT	Orioles	**W** 3–2	**Humphreys** (3–3)	Palmer (14–3)	–	1:51	5,376	77–71	W1
149	September 16	8:05 p.m. EDT	Orioles	L 0–1	McNally (19–6)	**Hannan** (6–6)	Watt (16)	2:41	8,165	77–72	L1
150	September 17	8:00 p.m. EDT	@ Yankees	L 1–2 (5)	Peterson (16–15)	**Cox** (12–6)	–	1:17	5,025	77–73	L2
151	September 18	8:00 p.m. EDT	@ Yankees	L 3–4	Stottlemyre (19–13)	**Moore** (8–8)	–	2:13	6,020	77–74	L3
–	September 23		@ Tigers	**Postponed (Rain)** (Makeup date: September 24)							
154	September 24	5:30 p.m. EDT	@ Tigers	**W** 8–4	**Hannan** (7–6)	McLain (23–9)	**Shellenback** (1)	2:38	–	79–75	W1
155	September 24	8:43 p.m. EDT	@ Tigers	**W** 7–4	**Higgins** (10–9)	Lolich (18–10)	**Knowles** (13)	2:44	14,032	80–75	W2
156	September 25	1:30 p.m. EDT	@ Tigers	**W** 7–2	**Bosman** (13–5)	Kilkenny (7–6)	–	2:18	4,589	81–75	W3

October: 1–0 (Home: 1–0; Away: 0–0)

#	Date	Time (ET)	Opponent	Score	Win	Loss	Save	Time of Game	Attendance	Record	Box/ Streak

Legend: = Win = Loss = Postponement
Bold = Senators team member

== Player stats ==
= Indicates team leader

=== Batting ===
==== Starters by position ====
Note: Pos = Position; G = Games played; AB = At bats; R = Runs scored; H = Hits; Avg. = Batting average; HR = Home runs; RBI = Runs batted in; SB = Stolen bases

Pos	Player	G	AB	R	H	Avg.	HR	RBI	SB
C	Paul Casanova	124	379	26	82	.216	4	37	0
1B	Mike Epstein	131	403	73	112	.278	30	85	2
2B	Bernie Allen	122	365	33	90	.247	9	45	5
3B	Ken McMullen	158	562	83	153	.272	19	87	4
SS	Ed Brinkman	151	576	71	153	.266	2	43	2
LF	Frank Howard	161	592	111	175	.296	48	111	1
CF	Del Unser	153	581	69	166	.286	7	57	8
RF	Lee Maye	71	238	41	69	.290	9	26	1

==== Other batters ====
Note: G = Games played; AB = At bats; R = Runs scored; H = Hits; Avg. = Batting average; HR = Home runs; RBI = Runs batted in; SB = Stolen bases

Player	G	AB	R	H	Avg.	HR	RBI	SB
Hank Allen	109	271	42	75	.277	1	17	12
Tim Cullen	119	249	22	52	.209	1	15	1
Brant Alyea	104	237	29	59	.249	11	40	1
Ed Stroud	123	206	35	52	.252	4	29	12
Jim French	63	158	14	29	.184	2	13	1
Zoilo Versalles	31	75	9	20	.267	0	6	1
Sam Bowens	33	57	6	11	.193	0	4	1
Dick Billings	27	37	3	5	.135	0	0	0
Gary Holman	41	31	1	5	.161	0	2	0
Dick Smith	21	28	2	3	.107	0	0	0
Doug Camilli	1	3	0	1	.333	0	0	0
Toby Harrah	8	1	4	0	.000	0	0	0

=== Pitching ===
==== Starting pitchers ====
Note: G = Games pitched; IP = Innings pitched; W = Wins; L = Losses; ERA = Earned run average; SO = Strikeouts

Player	G	IP	W	L	ERA	SO
Joe Coleman	40	247.2	12	13	3.27	182
Dick Bosman	31	193.0	14	5	2.19	99
Jim Hannan	35	158.1	7	6	3.64	72
Barry Moore	31	134.0	9	8	4.30	51
Camilo Pascual	14	55.1	2	5	6.83	34

==== Other pitchers ====
Note: G = Games pitched; IP = Innings pitched; W = Wins; L = Losses; ERA = Earned run average; SO = Strikeouts

Player	G	IP	W	L	ERA	SO
Casey Cox	52	171.2	12	7	2.78	73
Jim Shellenback	30	84.2	4	7	4.04	50
Frank Bertaina	14	35.2	1	3	6.56	25
Cisco Carlos	6	17.2	1	1	4.58	5

==== Relief pitchers ====
Note: G = Games pitched; W = Wins; L = Losses; SV = Saves; ERA = Earned run average; SO = Strikeouts

Player	G	W	L	SV	ERA	SO
Dennis Higgins	55	10	9	16	3.48	71
Darold Knowles	53	9	2	13	2.24	59
Bob Humphreys	47	3	3	5	3.05	43
Dave Baldwin	43	2	4	4	4.05	51
Jim Miles	10	0	1	0	6.20	15
Jan Dukes	8	0	2	0	2.45	3
Frank Kreutzer	4	0	0	0	4.50	2

== Awards and honors ==
- Del Unser, American League Leader, Triples (8)
- Del Unser, American League Record, Fewest Triples in One Season by an American League Leader (8)
- Ted Williams, Associated Press AL Manager of the Year

All-Star Game

- Frank Howard, starting LF
- Darold Knowles, reserve

== Farm system ==
Level	Team	League	Manager
AAA	Buffalo Bisons	International League	Héctor López
AA	Savannah Senators	Southern League	Hub Kittle
A	Burlington Senators	Carolina League	Buddy Hicks and Bill Haywood
A	Shelby Senators	Western Carolinas League	Joe Klein
Rookie	Wytheville Senators	Appalachian League	Dick Gernert

Savannah affiliation shared with Houston Astros
