= 1971 Washington Senators season =

1971 Washington Senators
- League: American League
- Division: East
- Ballpark: RFK Stadium
- City: Washington, D.C.
- Record: 63–96 (.396)
- League place: 6th
- Owners: Bob Short
- Managers: Ted Williams
- Television: WTOP – (Warner Wolf, Ray Scott, Tony Roberts)
- Radio: WWDC (FM) (Ron Menchine, Tony Roberts)

The 1971 Washington Senators season involved the Senators finishing fifth in the American League East with a record of 63 wins and 96 losses (.396). This was the Senators' 11th and last season in Washington, D.C.; they moved to Arlington, Texas, and became the Texas Rangers in 1972. The previous Senators (now Minnesota Twins) were in Washington from 1901 through 1960.

The move to Texas left Washington without a Major League Baseball team for 33 seasons, until the Montreal Expos of the National League relocated there in 2005 and became the current Washington Nationals.

== Offseason ==
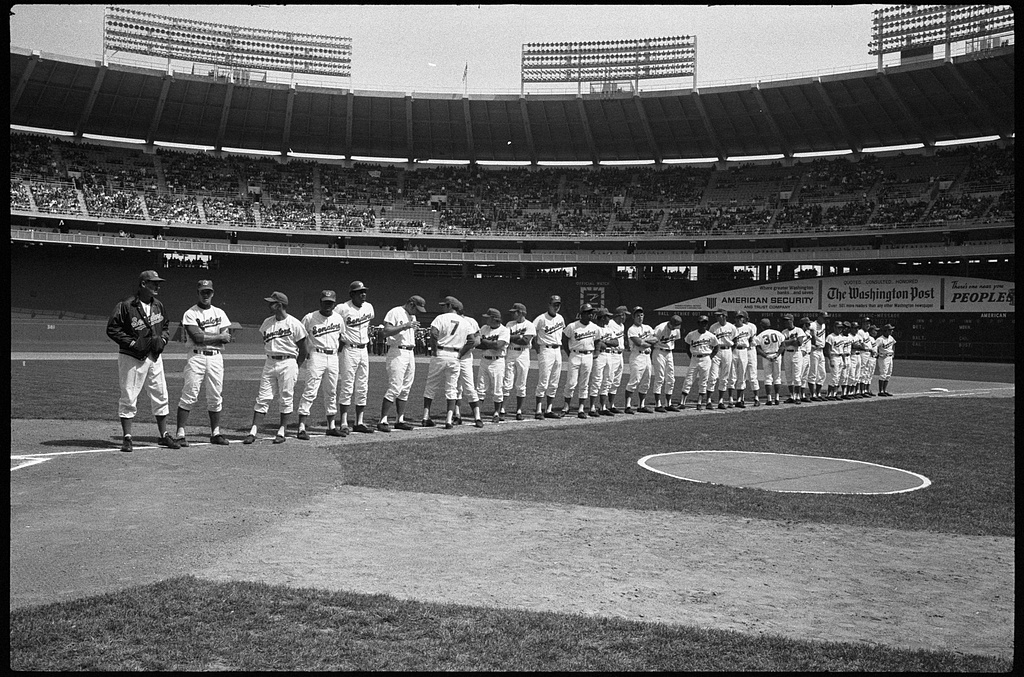
Opening Day 1971

- October 9, 1970: Ed Brinkman, Aurelio Rodríguez, Joe Coleman, and Jim Hannan were traded by the Senators to the Detroit Tigers for Denny McLain, Elliott Maddox, Norm McRae, and Don Wert.
- November 3, 1970: Greg Goossen and Gene Martin were traded by the Senators to the Philadelphia Phillies for Curt Flood and a player to be named. The Phillies completed the deal by sending Jeff Terpko to the Senators on April 10, 1971.
- November 30, 1970: Joe Foy was drafted by the Washington Senators from the New York Mets in the 1970 rule 5 draft.
- March 29, 1971: Ed Stroud was traded by the Senators to the Chicago White Sox for Tommy McCraw.

== Regular season ==
The acquisition of former Cy Young Award winner Denny McLain did not pay dividends for the franchise. Amid constant run-ins with no-nonsense Washington manager Ted Williams, McLain lost 22 games in 1971.

=== Relocation to Texas ===
By the end of the 1970 season, Senators owner Bob Short had issued an ultimatum: unless someone was willing to buy the Senators for $12 million, he would not renew his lease at RFK Stadium and move elsewhere. Several parties offered to buy the team, but all fell short of Short's asking price.

Short was especially receptive to an offer from Arlington mayor Tom Vandergriff, who had been trying to get a major league team to play in the Metroplex for over a decade. Years earlier, Charlie Finley, the owner of the Kansas City Athletics, sought to move his team to Dallas, but the idea was rebuffed by the other AL team owners.

Arlington's hole card was Turnpike Stadium, a 10,000-seat park which opened in 1965 to house the AA Dallas–Fort Worth Spurs of the Texas League. Built to major league specifications, it was located in a natural bowl, and only minor excavations were necessary to expand the park to major-league size.

After Vandergriff offered a multimillion-dollar up-front payment, Short finally decided to pull up stakes and move. On September 21, 1971, he got his wish, receiving approval from AL owners to move the franchise to Arlington for the 1972 season.

Washington fans were outraged, leaving public relations director Ted Rodgers with the unenviable task of putting a positive spin on such events as fans unfurling a giant banner that contained Short's name, preceded by a popular four-letter invective. A photo of the banner appeared on the front page of a DC newspaper the following day.

Fan enmity came to a head in the team's last game in Washington, on September 30. Thousands of fans simply walked in without paying because the security guards left early in the game, swelling the paid attendance of 14,460 to around 25,000. The Senators led 7–5 with two outs in the top of the ninth. Just then, fans poured onto the field, thinking the final out had already been made. A teenager scooped up first base and ran away. With no security guards in sight, the game was forfeited to the Yankees, 9–0.

=== Opening Day starters ===
- Dick Bosman
- Paul Casanova
- Tim Cullen
- Mike Epstein
- Curt Flood
- Joe Foy
- Toby Harrah
- Frank Howard
- Elliott Maddox

=== Season standings ===
AL East
Team	W	L	Pct.	GB	Home	Road
Baltimore Orioles	101	57	.639	—	53‍–‍24	48‍–‍33
Detroit Tigers	91	71	.562	12	54‍–‍27	37‍–‍44
Boston Red Sox	85	77	.525	18	47‍–‍33	38‍–‍44
New York Yankees	82	80	.506	21	44‍–‍37	38‍–‍43
Washington Senators	63	96	.396	38½	35‍–‍46	28‍–‍50
Cleveland Indians	60	102	.370	43	29‍–‍52	31‍–‍50

=== Record vs. opponents ===
1971 American League record Sources:
Team	BAL	BOS	CAL	CWS	CLE	DET	KC	MIL	MIN	NYY	OAK	WAS
Baltimore	—	9–9	7–5	8–4	13–5	8–10	6–5	9–3	10–2	11–7	7–4	13–3
Boston	9–9	—	6–6	10–2	11–7	12–6	1–11	6–6	8–4	7–11	3–9	12–6
California	5–7	6–6	—	8–10	8–4	6–6	8–10	6–12	12–6	6–6	7–11	4–8
Chicago	4–8	2–10	10–8	—	3–9	7–5	9–9	11–7	7–11	5–7	11–7	10–2
Cleveland	5–13	7–11	4–8	9–3	—	6–12	2–10	4–8	4–8	8–10	4–8	7–11
Detroit	10–8	6–12	6–6	5–7	12–6	—	8–4	10–2	6–6	10–8	4–8	14–4
Kansas City	5–6	11–1	10–8	9–9	10–2	4–8	—	8–10	9–9	5–7	5–13	9–3
Milwaukee	3–9	6–6	12–6	7–11	8–4	2–10	10–8	—	10–7	2–10	3–15	6–6
Minnesota	2–10	4–8	6–12	11–7	8–4	6–6	9–9	7–10	—	8–4	8–10	5–6
New York	7–11	11–7	6–6	7–5	10–8	8–10	7–5	10–2	4–8	—	5–7	7–11
Oakland	4–7	9–3	11–7	7–11	8–4	8–4	13–5	15–3	10–8	7–5	—	9–3
Washington	3–13	6–12	8–4	2–10	11–7	4–14	3–9	6–6	6–5	11–7	3–9	—

=== Notable transactions ===
- May 8: Darold Knowles and Mike Epstein were traded to the Oakland Athletics for Frank Fernández, Don Mincher, Paul Lindblad, and cash.
- June 8: 1971 Major League Baseball draft
  - Stan Thomas was selected in the 27th round.
  - Mike Cubbage was selected in the second round of the secondary phase.
- July 16: Joe Foy was released.
- September 27: Jim French was released.

=== Roster ===
1971 Washington Senators
Roster
Pitchers: 27 Dick Bosman; 18 Pete Broberg; 23 Jackie Brown; 29 Casey Cox; 13 Bill Gogolewski; 31 Joe Grzenda; 26 Gerry Janeski; 32 Darold Knowles; 32 Paul Lindblad; 17 Denny McLain; 28 Horacio Piña; 19 Denny Riddleberger; 16 Jim Shellenback; 24 Mike Thompson	Catchers: 8 Dick Billings; 5 Paul Casanova; 10 Bill Fahey; 10 Jim French; 20 Rick Stelmaszek; Infielders: 7 Bernie Allen; 1 Tim Cullen; 6 Mike Epstein; 14 Joe Foy; 11 Toby Harrah; 14 Jim Mason; 6 Don Mincher; 15 Dave Nelson; 15,21 Tom Ragland; 2 Len Randle; 2 Don Wert	Outfielders: 4 Larry Biittner; 20 Jeff Burroughs; 25 Frank Fernández; 21 Curt Flood; 33 Frank Howard; 37 Elliott Maddox; 3 Tommy McCraw; 35 Richie Scheinblum; 30 Del Unser	Manager: 9 Ted Williams; Coaches: 40 Joe Camacho; 42 Nellie Fox; 41 Sid Hudson; 43 George Susce; 44 Wayne Terwilliger; 45 Al Zarilla

== Player stats ==
=== Batting ===
==== Starters by position ====
Note: Pos = Position; G = Games played; AB = At bats; H = Hits; Avg. = Batting average; HR = Home runs; RBI = Runs batted in

Pos	Player	G	AB	H	Avg.	HR	RBI
C	Paul Casanova	94	311	63	.203	5	26
1B	Don Mincher	100	323	94	.291	10	45
2B	Tim Cullen	125	403	77	.191	2	26
SS	Toby Harrah	127	383	88	.230	2	22
3B	Dave Nelson	85	329	92	.280	5	33
LF	Frank Howard	153	549	153	.279	26	83
CF	Del Unser	153	581	148	.255	9	41
RF	Larry Biittner	66	171	44	.257	0	16

==== Other batters ====
Note: G = Games played; AB = At bats; H = Hits; Avg. = Batting average; HR = Home runs; RBI = Runs batted in

Player	G	AB	H	Avg.	HR	RBI
Dick Billings	116	349	86	.246	6	48
Elliott Maddox	128	258	56	.217	1	18
Bernie Allen	97	229	61	.266	4	22
Lenny Randle	75	215	47	.219	2	13
Tommy McCraw	122	207	44	.213	7	25
Jeff Burroughs	59	181	42	.232	5	25
Joe Foy	41	128	30	.234	0	11
Mike Epstein	24	85	21	.247	1	9
Richie Scheinblum	27	49	7	.143	0	4
Jim French	14	41	6	.146	0	4
Don Wert	20	40	2	.050	0	2
Curt Flood	13	35	7	.200	0	2
Frank Fernández	18	30	3	.100	0	4
Tom Ragland	10	23	4	.174	0	0
Jim Mason	3	9	3	.333	0	0
Rick Stelmaszek	6	9	0	.000	0	0
Bill Fahey	2	8	0	.000	0	0

=== Pitching ===
==== Starting pitchers ====
Note: G = Games pitched; IP = Innings pitched; W = Wins; L = Losses; ERA = Earned run average; SO = Strikeouts

Player	G	IP	W	L	ERA	SO
Dick Bosman	35	236.2	12	16	3.73	113
Denny McLain	33	216.2	10	22	4.28	103
Pete Broberg	18	124.2	5	9	3.47	89
Mike Thompson	16	66.2	1	6	4.86	41

==== Other pitchers ====
Note: G = Games pitched; IP = Innings pitched; W = Wins; L = Losses; ERA = Earned run average; SO = Strikeouts

Player	G	IP	W	L	ERA	SO
Casey Cox	54	124.1	5	7	3.98	43
Bill Gogolewski	27	124.1	6	5	2.75	70
Jim Shellenback	40	120.0	3	11	3.53	47
Gerry Janeski	23	61.2	1	5	4.96	19
Jackie Brown	14	47.0	3	4	5.94	21

==== Relief pitchers ====
Note: G = Games pitched; W = Wins; L = Losses; SV = Saves; ERA = Earned run average; SO = Strikeouts

Player	G	W	L	SV	ERA	SO
Paul Lindblad	43	6	4	8	2.58	50
Denny Riddleberger	57	3	1	1	3.23	56
Horacio Piña	56	1	1	2	3.59	38
Joe Grzenda	46	5	2	5	1.92	56
Darold Knowles	12	2	2	2	3.52	16

== Farm system ==
Level	Team	League	Manager
AAA	Denver Bears	American Association	Del Wilber
AA	Pittsfield Senators	Eastern League	Joe Klein
A	Burlington Senators	Carolina League	Whitey Kurowski
A	Anderson Senators	Western Carolinas League	Frank Gable and Bill Haywood
A-Short Season	Geneva Senators	New York–Penn League	Frank Gable

LEAGUE CHAMPIONS: Denver
