= 1973 Texas Rangers season =

1973 Texas Rangers
- League: American League
- Division: West
- Ballpark: Arlington Stadium
- City: Arlington, Texas
- Record: 57–105 (.352)
- Divisional place: 6th
- Owners: Bob Short
- General managers: Joe Burke, Dan O'Brien Sr.
- Managers: Whitey Herzog, Del Wilber, Billy Martin
- Television: KDFW (Dick Risenhoover, Tom Hedrick)
- Radio: KRLD (Dick Risenhoover, Bill Mercer)

The 1973 Texas Rangers season was the 13th of the Texas Rangers franchise overall, their 2nd in Arlington as the Rangers, and the 2nd season at Arlington Stadium. The Rangers finished sixth in the American League West with a record of 57 wins and 105 losses.

== Offseason ==
- October 27, 1972: Jim Panther was traded by the Rangers to the Atlanta Braves for Rico Carty.
- November 30, 1972: Horacio Piña was traded by the Rangers to the Oakland Athletics for Mike Epstein.
- November 30, 1972: Tom Ragland was traded by the Texas Rangers to the Cleveland Indians for Vince Colbert.
- January 10, 1973: 1973 Major League Baseball draft
  - Jeff Schneider was drafted by the Rangers in the 2nd round, but did not sign.
  - Jim Sundberg was drafted by the Rangers in the 1st round (2nd pick) of the Secondary Phase.

== Regular season ==
On July 30, 1973, Jim Bibby threw the first no-hitter in Texas Rangers history as he no-hit the Oakland Athletics. The Rangers won the game 6–0.

=== Season standings ===
AL West
Team	W	L	Pct.	GB	Home	Road
Oakland Athletics	94	68	.580	—	50‍–‍31	44‍–‍37
Kansas City Royals	88	74	.543	6	48‍–‍33	40‍–‍41
Minnesota Twins	81	81	.500	13	37‍–‍44	44‍–‍37
California Angels	79	83	.488	15	43‍–‍38	36‍–‍45
Chicago White Sox	77	85	.475	17	40‍–‍41	37‍–‍44
Texas Rangers	57	105	.352	37	35‍–‍46	22‍–‍59

=== Record vs. opponents ===
1973 American League record Sources:
Team	BAL	BOS	CAL	CWS	CLE	DET	KC	MIL	MIN	NYY	OAK	TEX
Baltimore	—	7–11	6–6	8–4	12–6	9–9	8–4	15–3	8–4	9–9	5–7	10–2
Boston	11–7	—	7–5	6–6	9–9	3–15	8–4	12–6	6–6	14–4	4–8	9–3
California	6–6	5–7	—	8–10	5–7	7–5	10–8	5–7	10–8	6–6	6–12	11–7
Chicago	4–8	6–6	10–8	—	7–5	5–7	6–12	3–9	9–9	8–4	6–12	13–5
Cleveland	6–12	9–9	7–5	5–7	—	9–9	2–10	9–9	7–5	7–11	3–9	7–5
Detroit	9–9	15–3	5–7	7–5	9–9	—	4–8	12–6	5–7	7–11	7–5	5–7
Kansas City	4–8	4–8	8–10	12–6	10–2	8–4	—	8–4	9–9	6–6	8–10	11–7
Milwaukee	3–15	6–12	7–5	9–3	9–9	6–12	4–8	—	8–4	10–8	4–8	8–4
Minnesota	4–8	6–6	8–10	9–9	5–7	7–5	9–9	4–8	—	3–9	14–4	12–6
New York	9–9	4–14	6–6	4–8	11–7	11–7	6–6	8–10	9–3	—	4–8	8–4
Oakland	7–5	8–4	12–6	12–6	9–3	5–7	10–8	8–4	4–14	8–4	—	11–7
Texas	2–10	3–9	7–11	5–13	5–7	7–5	7–11	4–8	6–12	4–8	7–11	—

=== Notable transactions ===
- May 20, 1973: Mike Epstein, Rich Hand and Rick Stelmaszek were traded by the Rangers to the California Angels for Jim Spencer and Lloyd Allen.
- June 5, 1973: David Clyde was drafted by the Rangers in the 1st round (1st pick) of the 1973 Major League Baseball draft.
- July 11, 1973: Jim Fregosi was purchased by the Rangers from the New York Mets.

=== David Clyde ===
David Clyde was a high school pitching phenom who was made the number one overall pick in the 1973 June draft. 22 days later, without having played in the minor leagues, Clyde made his MLB debut, the youngest player to play in an MLB game that year. Clyde won his first ever major league start (in front of a sellout crowd at Arlington Stadium, the first sellout in club history) and played in eighteen games (all starts) that season, finishing with a record of 4–8, with a 5.01 ERA.

=== Roster ===
1973 Texas Rangers
Roster
Pitchers: 26 Lloyd Allen; 22 Jim Bibby; 27 Dick Bosman; 18 Pete Broberg; 31 Jackie Brown; 32,50 David Clyde; 27 Steve Dunning; 34 Don Durham; 29 Steve Foucault; 28 Bill Gogolewski; 25 Rich Hand; 22 Rick Henninger; 14 Charlie Hudson; 33 Jim Kremmel; 16 Jim Merritt; 30 Mike Paul; 25 Jim Shellenback; 19 Sonny Siebert; 17 Don Stanhouse; 39 Rick Waits	Catchers: 8 Dick Billings; 32 Rick Stelmaszek; 10 Ken Suarez; Infielders: 26 Mike Epstein; 17 Jim Fregosi; 11 Toby Harrah; 35 Joe Lovitto; 24 Pete Mackanin; 38 Bill Madlock; 2 Jim Mason; 1 Dave Nelson; 21 Lenny Randle; 3,24 Jim Spencer; 21 Bill Sudakis	Outfielders: 4 Larry Biittner; 20 Jeff Burroughs; 5,25 Rico Carty; 6 Tom Grieve; 7 Vic Harris; 15 Alex Johnson; 23 Elliott Maddox; Other batters: 37 Don Castle	Manager: 40 Whitey Herzog; 1 Billy Martin; 44 Del Wilber; Coaches: 43 Chuck Estrada; 41 Chuck Hiller; 42 Jackie Moore

== Player stats ==
=== Batting ===
==== Starters by position ====
Note: Pos = Position; G = Games played; AB = At bats; H = Hits; Avg. = Batting average; HR = Home runs; RBI = Runs batted in

Pos	Player	G	AB	H	Avg.	HR	RBI
C	Ken Suarez	93	278	69	.248	1	27
1B	Jim Spencer	102	352	94	.267	4	43
2B	Dave Nelson	142	576	165	.286	7	48
SS	Toby Harrah	118	461	120	.260	10	50
3B	Jim Fregosi	45	157	42	.268	6	16
LF	Rico Carty	86	306	71	.232	3	33
CF	Vic Harris	152	555	138	.249	8	44
RF	Jeff Burroughs	151	526	147	.279	30	85
DH	Alex Johnson	158	624	179	.287	8	68

==== Other batters ====
Note: G = Games played; AB = At bats; H = Hits; Avg. = Batting average; HR = Home runs; RBI = Runs batted in

Player	G	AB	H	Avg.	HR	RBI
Dick Billings	81	280	50	.179	3	32
Larry Biittner	83	258	65	.252	1	12
Jim Mason	93	238	49	.206	3	19
Bill Sudakis	82	235	60	.255	15	43
Elliott Maddox	100	172	41	.238	1	17
Tom Grieve	66	123	38	.309	7	21
Pete Mackanin	44	90	9	.100	0	2
Mike Epstein	27	85	16	.188	1	6
Bill Madlock	21	77	21	.351	1	5
Joe Lovitto	26	44	6	.136	0	0
Lenny Randle	10	29	6	.207	1	1
Don Castle	4	13	4	.308	0	2
Rick Stelmaszek	7	9	1	.111	0	0

=== Pitching ===
==== Starting pitchers ====
Note: G = Games pitched; IP = Innings pitched; W = Wins; L = Losses; ERA = Earned run average; SO = Strikeouts

Player	G	IP	W	L	ERA	SO
Jim Bibby	26	180.1	9	10	3.24	155
Sonny Siebert	25	119.2	7	11	3.99	76
Pete Broberg	22	118.2	5	9	5.61	57
David Clyde	18	93.1	4	8	5.01	74
Rich Hand	8	41.2	2	3	5.40	14
Dick Bosman	7	40.1	2	5	4.24	14

==== Other pitchers ====
Note: G = Games pitched; IP = Innings pitched; W = Wins; L = Losses; ERA = Earned run average; SO = Strikeouts

Player	G	IP	W	L	ERA	SO
Jim Merritt	35	160.0	5	13	4.05	65
Steve Dunning	23	94.1	2	6	5.34	38
Mike Paul	36	87.1	5	4	4.95	49
Don Stanhouse	21	70.0	1	7	4.76	42
Lloyd Allen	23	41.0	0	6	9.22	25
Don Durham	15	40.1	0	4	7.59	23
Rick Henninger	6	23.0	1	0	2.74	6
Jim Kremmel	4	9.0	0	2	9.00	6

==== Relief pitchers ====
Note: G = Games pitched; W = Wins; L = Losses; SV = Saves; ERA = Earned run average; SO = Strikeouts

Player	G	W	L	SV	ERA	SO
Steve Foucault	32	2	4	8	3.88	28
Bill Gogolewski	49	3	6	6	4.22	77
Jackie Brown	25	5	5	2	3.92	45
Charlie Hudson	25	4	2	1	4.62	34
Jim Shellenback	2	0	0	0	0.00	3
Rick Waits	1	0	0	0	9.00	0

== Farm system ==
Level	Team	League	Manager
AAA	Spokane Indians	Pacific Coast League	Del Wilber
AA	Pittsfield Rangers	Eastern League	Joe Klein
A	Gastonia Rangers	Western Carolinas League	Rich Donnelly
Rookie	GCL Rangers	Gulf Coast League	Bill Haywood

LEAGUE CHAMPIONS: Spokane, GCL Rangers
