= Hawaii Islanders =

- 1961–1987; Honolulu, Hawaii

Minor league affiliations
- Class: Triple-A (1961–1987)
- League: Pacific Coast League (1961–1987)

Major league affiliations
- Team: Chicago White Sox (1987); Pittsburgh Pirates (1983–1986); San Diego Padres (1971–1982); California Angels (1969–1970); Chicago White Sox (1968); Washington Senators (1965–1967); Los Angeles Angels (1962–1964); Kansas City Athletics (1961)

Minor league titles
- League titles (2): 1975; 1976
- Division titles (7): 1970; 1975; 1976; 1977; 1979; 1980; 1984

Team data
- Name: Hawaii Islanders (1961–1987)
- Colors: Brown, yellow, white, black, red
- Ballpark: Les Murakami Stadium (1986–1987); Aloha Stadium (1976–1987); Honolulu Stadium (1961–1975)

The Hawaii Islanders were a Minor League Baseball team based in Honolulu, Hawaii, that played in the Triple-A Pacific Coast League for 27 seasons from 1961 through 1987.

Originally an affiliate of the Kansas City Athletics, the Islanders played their home games at Honolulu Stadium, Aloha Stadium and Les Murakami Stadium. After being one of the most successful minor league teams, the Islanders faltered and ultimately moved to the mainland as the Colorado Springs Sky Sox in 1988.

== History ==
The Islanders were originally an amateur team, but on December 17, 1960, the Sacramento Solons, a longtime member of the Pacific Coast League (PCL) of Minor League Baseball, moved to Honolulu. Minor League Baseball was struggling at the time, as sparse attendance, major league TV broadcasts, expansion and franchise shifts at the major league level, and retrenchment in farm system support caused the contraction of many minor league teams, and the collapse of entire leagues. The Islanders came to Hawaii in part due to these trends. The Solons had been suffering from attendance problems since the arrival of the San Francisco Giants from New York City in 1958. Salt Lake City businessman Nick Morgan bought the Solons and moved them to Hawaii. Two years later, Morgan sold the Islanders to a locally based group.

By the end of the 1960s, the Islanders were reckoned as the strongest franchise in the minors. In 1970, the Islanders, then an affiliate of the California Angels and managed by Chuck Tanner, won 98 games and drew over 400,000 fans to lead the minors as a whole. Although it lost the PCL playoff championship to the Spokane Indians, the 1970 team was named the 38th greatest team in minor league history by Minor League Baseball historians.

Due to the Islanders being a distant 2,500 miles (4,000 km) from their nearest opponent, they utilized a unique schedule. Initially, PCL teams made a four- and a seven-game visit to the Islands, with the Islanders doing the same. Later, as the league expanded, the Islanders played an eight-game series against each team in order to cut down on travel costs.

The travel costs also applied to radio coverage. In the early 1960s, due to the cost of line charges, Islanders radio announcers used the old method of "re-creating" the road games in the Honolulu radio studio. This method was used by most major league teams during the 1930s and 1940s. In those days, the team's radio play-by-play man was Harry Kalas, who had just gotten out of the service. When Kalas later moved on to the mainland (with the Houston Astros and later the Philadelphia Phillies), he was replaced as Islanders play-by-play man by Hank Greenwald (later a broadcaster for the Giants); Marty Chase succeeded Greenwald in 1966 and was the play-by-play announcer through 1968. A young Al Michaels arrived in June 1968 after Chase was recalled to active Army duty. Other Islanders broadcast alumni who went on to broadcast Major League Baseball include Ken Wilson, Les Keiter, Mel Proctor, and Allan Elconin (a.k.a. Al Conin).

In the early 1970s, the Islanders were the closest thing to an independent team in the high minors. While standard minor league working agreements in recent times require a minor league team to cede complete control of its roster to its major league parent, the Islanders' early deals with the San Diego Padres typically called for the Padres to send only about six players to Hawaii. The Islanders then signed players on their own to fill most of the roster spots, and were free to trade, sell or release them without approval from San Diego. This worked very well for the Islanders, as they won consecutive PCL titles in 1975 and 1976.

The Islanders achieved success and stability as the Padres' top affiliate from 1971 to 1982, but spent the second half of the 1980s in short-term affiliations with the Pittsburgh Pirates and Chicago White Sox.

The beginning of the end, however, came when the Islanders moved from rickety Honolulu Stadium to Aloha Stadium in 1976. It had been obvious for some time that Honolulu Stadium needed to be replaced. The wooden stadium was built in 1926 and had long since fallen below Triple-A standards; known as the "Termite Palace," it had reached the end of its useful life by the mid-1960s. However, the new multi-purpose stadium was located in Halawa in west-central Oahu, far from the team's fan base. Attendance, already in decline, fell even further. Fans were unwilling to make the drive, and those wanting to take TheBus to the stadium balked at having to walk through Aloha Stadium's parking lots to get to the seats; the Honolulu Stadium stop was right at the main gate. Additionally, the lease with the state government, which owned the stadium, didn't allow the Islanders to earn any proceeds from concessions or advertising, severely limiting the team's income. The 1976 pennant winners almost didn't finish the season when the IRS padlocked the team office and the PCL briefly canceled their franchise.

The 1976 team almost lost a chance at the pennant due to an incident in May. Aloha Stadium management initially refused to allow the use of metal spikes; the stadium had opened the previous September, with artificial turf. When the Tacoma Twins complied with a parent-club directive to wear their metal spikes, stadium management turned off the center field lights. After 35 minutes, the umpires forfeited the game to the Twins. The Islanders protested, claiming they had no control over the lights. However, the PCL sided with the Twins, citing longstanding rules holding the home team responsible for providing acceptable playing conditions. Due to the forfeit, the Islanders entered the final series of the season 1½ games ahead of the Tacoma in the Western Division, but the Twins won three straight at home over Spokane and Hawaii lost two at home to Sacramento, so Tacoma was a game up with one remaining. The results were reversed on the final day of the regular season and the two teams tied at 76–68 (.528). Hawaii prevailed in a one-game playoff the next day in Tacoma to win the division crown. The championship series (best-of-five) was a rematch with Eastern division champion Salt Lake 90–54 (.625), with all five games were played at Salt Lake's Derks Field. After winning the opener on Wednesday night, the Islanders lost the next two games, but won the final two to repeat as league champions.

During its final season in 1987, the Islanders finished last in their division and last overall in attendance (116,000 fans) in the PCL. By this time, the team's financial problems were becoming more acute, in part due to what the Honolulu Star-Bulletin called the worst lease in the PCL. Prior to the 1988 season, citing years of dwindling attendance, the team moved to Colorado Springs and became the Sky Sox.

When announcing the Islanders' move in August 1987, owner David Elmore of Elmore Sports Group announced that he would move a Short-Season A Northwest League club, reported to be the Salem Angels to Honolulu for the 1988 season. This did not come to fruition, though, and Hawaii has been without minor league baseball ever since.

== Aftermath and influence ==
Five years after the Islanders left Hawaii, the minor league Hawaii Winter Baseball was founded in 1993 and played their games from October to December. The league was affiliated with the Major Leagues and continued play until 1997, and from 2006 until it folded a second time in 2008.

== Notable alumni ==
- Hank Allen
- Gene Bacque
- Bobby Balcena
- Dave Baldwin
- Bo Belinsky
- Barry Bonds
- Dick Bosman
- Clete Boyer
- George Brunet
- Carmen Fanzone
- Jim French
- Tony Gwynn
- Harry Kalas (announcer)
- Sam Khalifa
- Bobby Knoop
- Bob Lemon (manager)
- Winston Llenas
- Al Michaels (announcer)
- Andy Miyamoto
- Irv Noren (manager)
- Tommy Sandt (manager)
- Tom Satriano
- Chuck Tanner (manager)
- Derek Tatsuno
- Mark Thurmond
- Bobby Valentine
- Fred Valentine
- Bob Walk
- Jay Ward
- Kenny Williams
- Mackay Yanagisawa (owner)

== Yearly records ==
Year	Record	Finish	Manager	Playoffs
1961	68-86	6th	Tommy Heath / Bill Werle	
1962	77-76	5th	Irv Noren	
1963	81-77	4th	Irv Noren	
1964	60-98	10th	Bob Lemon	
1965	75-72	6th (t)	George Case	
1966	63-84	10th	George Case	
1967	60-87	12th	Wayne Terwilliger	
1968	78-69	3rd	Bill Adair	
1969	74-72	4th	Chuck Tanner	
1970	98-48	1st	Chuck Tanner	League Finals
1971	73-73	4th (t)	Bill Adair	
1972	74-74	5th	Rocky Bridges	
1973	70-74	5th	Rocky Bridges / Warren Hacker / Roy Hartsfield	
1974	67-77	6th	Roy Hartsfield	
1975	88-56	1st	Roy Hartsfield	League champions
1976	77-68	2nd	Roy Hartsfield	League champions
1977	79-67	2nd	Dick Phillips	League Finals
1978	56-82	8th	Dick Phillips	
1979	72-76	8th	Dick Phillips	League Finals
1980	76-65	5th	Doug Rader	League Finals
1981	72-65	3rd (t)	Doug Rader	1st round
1982	73-71	5th	Doug Rader	
1983	72-71	5th	Tom Trebelhorn	
1984	87-53	1st	Tommy Sandt	League Finals
1985	84-59	1st	Tommy Sandt	1st round
1986	65-79	9th	Tommy Sandt	
1987	65-75	9th	Bob Bailey	

== Cultural references ==
Pernell Roberts guest starred in a two-part Hawaii Five-O episode, "The Grandstand Play", as a former Major League Baseball star who moved to Hawaii for the benefit of his son (played by Elliot Street), who gets mixed up in the murder of a local socialite.

The Islanders baseball team is mentioned on a number of occasions in the 1980s television series Magnum, P.I. The main character played by Tom Selleck was a fan of the Islanders and often wore a Detroit Tigers ball cap.
