= Jan Dukes =

American baseball player (born 1945)

- Pitcher
- Born: August 16, 1945 (age 80); Cheyenne, Wyoming, U.S.
- Batted: Left Threw: Left

MLB debut
- September 6, 1969, for the Washington Senators

Last MLB appearance
- July 22, 1972, for the Texas Rangers

MLB statistics
- Win–loss record: 0–2
- Earned run average: 2.70
- Strikeouts: 7
- Stats at Baseball Reference

Teams
- Washington Senators (1969–1970); Texas Rangers (1972)

Noble Jan Dukes (born August 16, 1945) is an American former professional baseball player, a left-handed pitcher who worked in 16 games, all in relief, in the major leagues for parts of three seasons with the 1969 and 1970 Washington Senators and, after the franchise moved, the 1972 Texas Rangers. He was born in Cheyenne, Wyoming, and was listed as 5 feet 11 inches (1.80 m) tall and 175 pounds (79 kg).

Dukes attended Santa Clara University, and was the Senators' first selection (eighth overall) in the secondary phase of the 1967 January Major League Baseball draft. He split 1967, his first pro season, between Double-A York and Triple-A Hawaii, then two full years with Triple-A Buffalo before getting a September 1969 call-up from the Senators. He made his MLB debut on September 6 against the Boston Red Sox at Fenway Park. Coming into the game in a mop-up role — Boston led 8–0 in the fourth inning — Dukes allowed only one run in three innings pitched before leaving for pinch hitter Ed "The Creeper" Stroud. His effort enabled Washington stay close, although they finally succumbed, 9–5. Manager Ted Williams was impressed enough to use Dukes in relief in seven more September games; he lost his only two decisions, but allowed only three earned runs in 11 full innings pitched, for a solid 2.45 earned run average.

Dukes began 1970 in the Senators' bullpen, and, after a rocky first outing, he settled down to pitch effectively, posting an ERA of 2.70. But, after April 22, he was sent down to Triple-A Denver, where he appeared in 112 games over the next three seasons. During that time, after the 1971 season, the Washington franchise transferred to Dallas–Fort Worth and became the renamed Texas Rangers. When Dukes was finally summoned from Denver in July 1972, it was as a Ranger, and he appeared in three games, all Texas losses, with an earned run average of 3.86 in 21/3 innings pitched. His final appearance on July 22 closed the book on his MLB career: in his 16 games, he compiled a 0–2 won–lost record with no saves and four games finished. In 20 career innings, he permitted 15 hits, ten bases on balls and six earned runs, for a career earned run average of 2.70. He struck out seven.

Dukes pitched at the Triple-A level, including service in the Mexican League, before leaving baseball after the 1973 season.
