= Bob Humphreys (baseball) =

American baseball player (born 1935)

- Pitcher
- Born: August 18, 1935 (age 90); Covington, Virginia, U.S.
- Batted: Right Threw: Right

MLB debut
- September 8, 1962, for the Detroit Tigers

Last MLB appearance
- September 25, 1970, for the Milwaukee Brewers

MLB statistics
- Win–loss record: 27–21
- Earned run average: 3.36
- Strikeouts: 364
- Stats at Baseball Reference

Teams
- Detroit Tigers (1962); St. Louis Cardinals (1963–1964); Chicago Cubs (1965); Washington Senators (1966–1970); Milwaukee Brewers (1970)

Career highlights and awards
- World Series champion (1964)

Robert William Humphreys (born August 18, 1935) is an American former professional baseball player and executive. A right-hander, Humphreys was a relief pitcher over all or parts of nine Major League Baseball seasons (1962–1970) with the Detroit Tigers, St. Louis Cardinals, Chicago Cubs, Washington Senators and Milwaukee Brewers. Humphreys was a member of the 1964 World Series champion Cardinals.

An alumnus of Hampden-Sydney College, Humphreys was born in Covington, Virginia, and graduated from high school in Montvale. He was listed as 5 feet 11 inches (1.80 m) tall and 165 pounds (75 kg).

== Playing career ==
Humphreys' pro pitching career began in the Tigers' organization in 1958 and lasted through 1971. After trials with Detroit (1962) and St. Louis (1963), Humphreys was recalled from the Triple-A Jacksonville Suns in July 1964, and worked in 28 games out of the Redbird bullpen. He won his only two decisions (both coming during the September pennant race) and posted two saves with a 2.53 earned run average as St. Louis overcame the Philadelphia Phillies to win the National League championship. In Game 6 of the 1964 World Series, he worked the ninth inning and retired the New York Yankees in order; it was Humphreys' only post-season appearance. The Cardinals won the Series' deciding seventh game a day later.

Humphreys was traded to the Cubs just prior to the 1965 campaign. In his only season with Chicago, he appeared in 41 games and again posted a 2–0 record. Then, prior to 1966, he was traded to the Senators, where he played four full years and part of a fifth. In 214 games pitched as a Senator, he compiled a 21–15 record with 14 saves. Released by the Senators, he signed with the Brewers two days later on June 15, 1970. He finished his MLB career with the Brewers and was credited with three more saves.

All told, Humphreys compiled a 27–21 record with 20 saves and a 3.36 earned run average in 319 major league appearances, all but four of which came as a relief pitcher. In 566 innings pitched he allowed 482 hits and 219 bases on balls. He struck out 364.

== College coach, MLB executive ==
After his playing career ended, Humphreys remained in baseball as a player development director and minor league field coordinator for the Brewers, Cardinals and Toronto Blue Jays.

From 1974 to 1978, Humphreys was also the head baseball coach at Virginia Tech. He posted a 135–60 overall record over five seasons, with two appearances in the NCAA Division I Baseball Championship tournament (1976 and 1977).
