= Tim Cullen =

American baseball player (born 1942)

- Second baseman / Shortstop
- Born: February 16, 1942 (age 84); San Francisco, California, U.S.
- Batted: Right Threw: Right

MLB debut
- August 8, 1966, for the Washington Senators

Last MLB appearance
- October 1, 1972, for the Oakland Athletics

MLB statistics
- Batting average: .220
- Home runs: 9
- Runs batted in: 134
- Stats at Baseball Reference

Teams
- Washington Senators (1966–1967); Chicago White Sox (1968); Washington Senators (1968–1971); Oakland Athletics (1972)

Career highlights and awards
- World Series champion (1972)

Timothy Leo Cullen (born February 16, 1942) is an American former professional baseball infielder. He played in Major League Baseball (MLB) for the Washington Senators (1966–67, 1968–71), Chicago White Sox (1968) and Oakland Athletics (1972). He batted and threw right-handed.

In a six-season career, Cullen was a .220 hitter with nine home runs and 134 RBI in 700 games. Cullen is one of the few rookies in Major League Baseball to hit a come-from-behind walk-off home run (on Aug 18, 1967).

== Early life ==
Timothy Leo Cullen was born on February 16, 1942, in San Francisco, California. He attended Junípero Serra High School in San Mateo, California, where he excelled in basketball and baseball. Cullen was selected an All-CAL infielder twice and an All-CAL guard as a senior. He graduated in 1960 and was inducted into the school's Athletic Hall of Fame in 1991.

== College career ==
Cullen was a two-sport star at Santa Clara University and played in the College World Series.

== Professional career ==
=== Draft and minor leagues ===
Before the 1964 MLB season, Cullen was signed by the Boston Red Sox as an amateur free agent.

On November 30, 1964, Cullen was drafted by the Washington Senators from the Boston Red Sox in the 1964 first-year draft.

=== Washington Senators (1966–1967) ===
On August 8, 1966 at D.C. Stadium, in a game against the Detroit Tigers, Cullen made his Major League debut. On August 16 at Cleveland Stadium, in a 6-5 win over the Cleveland Indians, Cullen hit a single to left field off of four-time and 1966 AL All-Star pitcher Gary Bell for his first career Major League hit and single. On August 17 at Cleveland Stadium, leading off the top of the fifth inning against Cleveland Indians pitcher Steve Hargan, Cullen drew his first career Major League base on balls. Cullen was a Topps Rookie All-Star in his inaugural season.

On August 18, 1967 at D.C. Stadium, in a 7-6 walk-off win over the Kansas City Athletics, Cullen hit a walk-off three-run home run to deep left field off of pitcher Paul Lindblad in the bottom of the ninth inning. Catcher Paul Casanova and third baseman Ken McMullen scored. After trailing 4-6, Cullen became one of the few rookies in Major League Baseball to hit a come-from-behind walk-off home run.

=== Chicago White Sox (1968) ===
On February 13, 1968, Cullen was traded by the Washington Senators with Buster Narum and Bob Priddy to the Chicago White Sox for Ron Hansen, Dennis Higgins, and Steve Jones.

=== Washington Senators (1968–1971) ===
In a curious move, on August 2, 1968, Cullen was shipped back mid-season by the Chicago White Sox to the Washington Senators for Hansen, making them the only two players in Major League history to be traded for one another twice in the same season.

=== Oakland Athletics (1972) ===
On April 15, 1972, Cullen signed as a free agent with the Oakland Athletics. Cullen appeared in the 1972 World Series with Oakland. Like Gonzalo Márquez, Cullen was a valuable utility for the World Championship team providing support from the bench during the regular season.

== Post-playing career ==
Cullen serves as the vice president of special projects for the Single-A Fresno Grizzlies, a Colorado Rockies minor league affiliate team.

== Personal life ==
Cullen is currently a resident of Fresno, California.
