= Dave Nelson =

American baseball player (1944–2018)

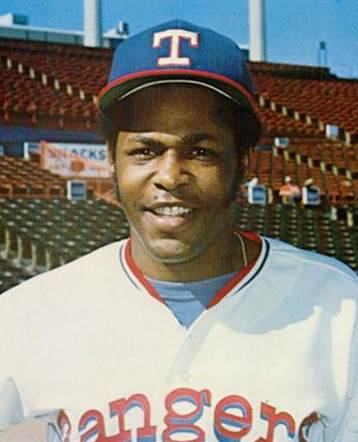
- Nelson in 1974
- Second baseman / Third baseman
- Born: June 20, 1944; Fort Sill, Oklahoma, U.S.
- Died: April 22, 2018 (aged 73); Milwaukee, Wisconsin, U.S.
- Batted: Right Threw: Right

MLB debut
- April 11, 1968, for the Cleveland Indians

Last MLB appearance
- September 27, 1977, for the Kansas City Royals

MLB statistics
- Batting average: .244
- Home runs: 20
- Runs batted in: 211
- Stats at Baseball Reference

Teams
- Cleveland Indians (1968–1969); Washington Senators / Texas Rangers (1970–1975); Kansas City Royals (1976–1977)

Career highlights and awards
- All-Star (1973)

David Earl Nelson (June 20, 1944 – April 22, 2018) was an American professional baseball infielder. He played in Major League Baseball for the Cleveland Indians, Washington Senators / Texas Rangers, and Kansas City Royals from 1968 through 1977. He also served as one of the broadcasters for the Milwaukee Brewers on Fox Sports Wisconsin.

During a period in the early 2010 season, Nelson was the team's interim radio color commentator over the Brewers Radio Network during road games outside of Chicago while Bob Uecker recovered from heart surgery to repair an aortic valve. He was the team's first base coach for four years prior to the end of his contract. He helped to develop many players, including Kenny Lofton, Scott Podsednik and Rickie Weeks.

== Early years ==
Nelson was born in Fort Sill, Oklahoma. He graduated from Junipero Serra High School in Gardena, California, and attended Compton Junior College and Los Angeles State College. Nelson served for six years in the Army Reserve.

== Playing career ==
Nelson played his first career game with the Cleveland Indians on April 11, 1968, spending two seasons with Cleveland before being traded to the Washington Senators with Ron Law and Horacio Piña for Dennis Higgins and Barry Moore during the 1969–70 offseason.

In 1971, Nelson began seeing regular time in the field, coming to bat over 300 times for the first time in his career. At the end of that season, Nelson scored the last run ever for the Washington Senators at RFK stadium.

Nelson moved with the franchise to Texas, where he continued to gain a reputation as a base-stealing threat, stealing 51 bases in 1972. He had his best year in 1973, when he played in his one and only All-Star Game, playing one inning at third base but not coming to bat. That year, he finished with a batting average of .286, with seven home runs and 48 RBIs. He remained with the Rangers until being traded to the Kansas City Royals in exchange for Nelson Briles following the 1975 season.

Nelson spent two seasons in Kansas City, playing sparingly off the bench. In 1976, he got his only taste of postseason action. Pinch-hitting for Tom Poquette in Game 3 of the 1976 American League Championship Series against the New York Yankees, he grounded out against Sparky Lyle. He played in his final major league game on September 27, 1977, then retired after the season.

== Post-playing career ==
=== Coaching ===
In 1980, Nelson was named a coach for Texas Christian University's baseball team. The following season, he returned to the majors as a coach for the Chicago White Sox, where he remained until 1984. Over the next two-plus decades would work in various capacities for the Oakland Athletics (Director of Instruction, 1986–1987), Montreal Expos (minor league baserunning instructor, 1990–1991), Cleveland Indians (1992–1997), and Milwaukee Brewers (minor league outfield instructor, 2001–2002, first base coach, 2003–2006).

=== Broadcasting ===
Nelson was a pregame analyst for the Milwaukee Brewers on Fox Sports Wisconsin. He was also the Director of Milwaukee Brewers Alumni Relations. His previous experience as a sportscaster was on Kansas City Royals telecasts in 1979, on Chicago Cubs radio broadcasts from 1988–1989, and on Cleveland Indians radio broadcasts from 1998–1999.

=== Charity work ===
Nelson also sat on the board of directors for Open Arms Home for Children, a non-profit organization that provides homes to orphaned children affected by the HIV/AIDS pandemic in South Africa.

== Death ==
Nelson died of liver cancer on April 22, 2018, in Milwaukee, Wisconsin, at the age of 73.

== Honors ==
On May 26, 2012 Nelson was inducted into the Compton Community College Athletics Hall of Fame, under the category of Baseball.
