= Dick Smith (outfielder) =

American baseball player (born 1944)

- Left fielder
- Born: August 25, 1944 (age 82); Lincolnton, North Carolina, U.S.
- Batted: Right Threw: Right

MLB debut
- August 20, 1969, for the Washington Senators

Last MLB appearance
- September 27, 1969, for the Washington Senators

MLB statistics
- Batting average: .107
- Home runs: 0
- Runs batted in: 0
- Stats at Baseball Reference

Teams
- Washington Senators (1969)

Richard Kelly Smith (born August 25, 1944) is an American former professional baseball player, an outfielder who appeared in 21 games for the 1969 Washington Senators of Major League Baseball. Smith attended Lenoir-Rhyne College. He stood 6 feet 5 inches (1.96 m) tall, weighed 200 pounds (91 kg), and threw and batted right-handed.

Smith was in his sixth season in the Washington farm system when he was recalled from the Triple-A Buffalo Bisons in August after batting .325 in 84 games. He debuted as the Senators' starting left fielder against Tommy John of the Chicago White Sox and notched his first MLB hit, a single, in the sixth inning. But he made only two more hits, both singles, over his next 20 game appearances, and finished his MLB career with three safeties in 28 at bats; he walked four times and fanned seven times.

His minor league baseball career concluded after the 1970 season; he batted .284 in 2,644 minor league at bats during his career.
