= Larry Biittner =

American baseball player (1946–2022)

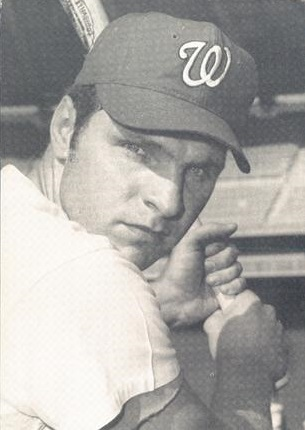
- Biittner in 1971
- Outfielder / First baseman
- Born: July 27, 1946; Pocahontas, Iowa, U.S.
- Died: January 2, 2022 (aged 75); Pocahontas, Iowa, U.S.
- Batted: Left Threw: Left

MLB debut
- July 17, 1970, for the Washington Senators

Last MLB appearance
- September 29, 1983, for the Texas Rangers

MLB statistics
- Batting average: .273
- Home runs: 29
- Runs batted in: 354
- Stats at Baseball Reference

Teams
- Washington Senators / Texas Rangers (1970–1973); Montreal Expos (1974–1976); Chicago Cubs (1976–1980); Cincinnati Reds (1981–1982); Texas Rangers (1983)

Lawrence David Biittner (July 27, 1946 – January 2, 2022) was an American outfielder and first baseman in Major League Baseball (MLB) who played for four teams from 1970 to 1983, most notably the Chicago Cubs and Washington Senators / Texas Rangers. He enjoyed his best season with the Cubs in 1977, batting .298 with 12 home runs and 62 runs batted in (RBI), and posting career highs in nearly every category. In later years he was increasingly used as a pinch hitter, which became his primary role in his final three seasons.

== Early life ==
Biittner was born in Pocahontas, Iowa, on July 27, 1946. He was one of twelve children of Edward Oscar Biittner and Henrietta Amollia (Stoulil). His paternal grandparents immigrated from Germany in 1879. Biittner attended Catholic High in his hometown, graduating in 1964. He was awarded a basketball scholarship by Drake University, but eventually transferred to Buena Vista College on a basketball and baseball scholarship. He was subsequently drafted by the Washington Senators in the tenth round of the 1968 Major League Baseball draft.

== Professional career ==
=== Washington Senators / Texas Rangers (1970–1973) ===
Biittner played two seasons in the minor leagues from 1968 to 1970, while spending almost all the 1969 season serving in the US Army. He made his MLB debut on July 17, 1970, ten days before his 24th birthday, entering as a pinch hitter and grounding out in his only plate appearance in a 10–0 loss against the California Angels. During his rookie year in 1971, he finished fourth in the American League (AL) in assists (6) and errors (5) by a right fielder, despite playing only 44 games defensively. He also posted a batting average of .257 and batted .368 as a pinch hitter.

Biittner's .259 average in 1972 was tied with Toby Harrah for the team lead. He also hit his first home run on June 30 that year, immediately after Ted Ford hit one. This marked the first back-to-back home runs in Texas Rangers history.

=== Montreal Expos (1974–1976) ===
Biittner was traded from the Rangers to the Montreal Expos for Pat Jarvis on December 20, 1973. He spent the first part of the 1974 season with the Memphis Blues (the Expos' Class-AAA affiliate), before being promoted to the major league roster in August. However, he was limited to pinch-hitting appearances. The following year saw Biittner bat .315 (the highest among Expos players that season), along with 109 hits and 28 runs batted in (RBI). He was later traded with Steve Renko to the Chicago Cubs on May 17, 1976, in exchange for Andre Thornton.

=== Chicago Cubs (1976–1980) ===
Biittner initially played in a platoon role for the Cubs at first base and left field. However, a hand injury at the end of July relegated him to pinch-hitting for the remainder of the 1976 season. He rebounded the following year, recording career-highs in plate appearances (532), hits (147), home runs (12), and RBIs (62) to go along with a .298 batting average. He also finished ninth in the National League in at bat per strikeout (13.7) and eighth in double plays grounded into (17).

Biittner made his first and only pitching appearance during a July 4 doubleheader against the Expos, surrendering six earned runs while closing out a 19–3 loss. He struck out three in 1 1/3 innings pitched while also giving up three home runs. He was also fined $50 for throwing over Del Unser's head. He was later asked what his best pitch was, and he jokingly answered, "The home run ball!"[Chicago Tribune, July 5, 1977, p.55 or sec.4 p.1] He fell a triple short of hitting for the cycle on September 26 of that same year.

Biittner received less playing time over his final three seasons with the Cubs and did not exceed 300 plate appearances in 1979 or 1980. He again fell short of the cycle on August 15, 1979, this time missing the feat by a home run. He later equalled the franchise record for most pinch hits (46) on October 5 the following year.

=== Later years ===
Biittner signed with the Cincinnati Reds on January 12, 1981, becoming the first free agent signed by the franchise. He was limited to just 42 games that year due to the strike. In 1982, he hit .310 with two home runs and 24 RBIs before being released at the end of the season.

Later in December 1982, the Texas Rangers signed Biittner as a free agent. He played his final major league game on September 29, 1983, at the age of 37. He was ultimately released at the end of the season on October 31, 1983. In 1,217 games over 14 seasons, Biittner posted a .273 batting average (861-for-3151) with 310 runs, 29 home runs, 354 RBI, and 236 bases on balls. Defensively, he recorded a .985 fielding percentage playing at first base and all three outfield positions.

== Personal life ==
Biittner married Ann Janette Cleal in 1968. They met when he was a college sophomore and she a high school senior. Together, they had two children: Thomas and Robert. They divorced in 1989.

After retiring from professional baseball, Biitner worked at the Chicago Mercantile Exchange, and also worked briefly in real estate. He ultimately returned to his hometown in Iowa in 1990 and farmed with his former brother-in-law. He died on January 2, 2022, at the age of 75. He suffered from cancer prior to his death.
