= Dick Bosman =

American baseball player (born 1944)

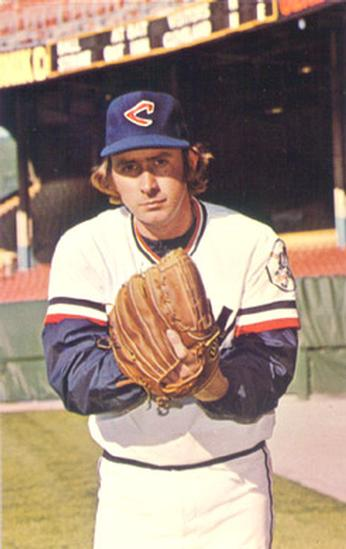
- Pitcher
- Born: February 17, 1944 (age 82); Kenosha, Wisconsin, U.S.
- Batted: Right Threw: Right

MLB debut
- June 1, 1966, for the Washington Senators

Last MLB appearance
- September 19, 1976, for the Oakland Athletics

MLB statistics
- Win–loss record: 82–85
- Earned run average: 3.67
- Strikeouts: 757
- Stats at Baseball Reference

Teams
- As player: Washington Senators / Texas Rangers (1966–1973); Cleveland Indians (1973–1975); Oakland Athletics (1975–1976); As coach: Chicago White Sox (1986–1987); Baltimore Orioles (1992–1994); Texas Rangers (1995–2000)

Career highlights and awards
- AL ERA leader (1969); Pitched a no-hitter on July 19, 1974

Richard Allen Bosman (born February 17, 1944) is an American former professional baseball pitcher. He played in Major League Baseball (MLB) for the Washington Senators / Texas Rangers (1966–73), Cleveland Indians (1973–75), and Oakland Athletics (1975–76). Bosman started the final game for the expansion Senators and the first game for the Texas Rangers. He is the only pitcher in Major League history to miss a perfect game due to his own fielding error.

== Baseball career ==
Bosman was signed as an amateur free agent by the Pittsburgh Pirates in 1963. Following that season, he was drafted from the Pirates by the San Francisco Giants, and then a year later was drafted again by the Senators. After another season in the minors, Bosman made his major league debut on June 1, 1966.

Bosman pitched for the Senators, and later the Rangers, for eight seasons. In 1969, he compiled a 14–5 mark and led the league in earned run average (2.19). He reached a career-high 16 victories in 1970, one of which was a one-hit, 1-0 shutout against Minnesota on August 14. César Tovar gave him the Twins' only hit, a single.

Bosman was traded, along with Ted Ford, from the Rangers to the Indians for Steve Dunning on May 10, 1973. On July 19, 1974, Bosman no-hit the defending World Series Champion Oakland Athletics, a team that would go on to win the 1974 World Series to three-peat after winning the World Series in 1972 and 1973. He missed a rare perfect game due only to his own throwing error in the fourth inning, which gave the A's their lone baserunner in a 4-0 Indians victory.

The following season, Bosman would be traded to the very team he no-hit, as he was traded by the Indians, along with Jim Perry, to the A's in exchange for Blue Moon Odom. During the 1975 season, Bosman won 11 games to help Oakland to a division title. He remained with Oakland in 1976, but was released by the A's in spring training of 1977, bringing his baseball career to an end.

Bosman compiled 82 wins, 757 strikeouts, and a 3.67 earned run average. After retiring, he served as a pitching coach for the Chicago White Sox (1986–87), Rochester Red Wings (1988–91), Baltimore Orioles (1992–94), Texas Rangers (1995–2000), and was a coach in the Tampa Bay Rays' system from 2001. Known for teaching pitchers how to control the running game, Bosman had a hand in developing James Shields, Wade Davis, Jake McGee, Jeremy Hellickson and Alex Cobb. Bosman retired after the conclusion of the 2018 season.

== Sources ==
- Robbins, Mike (2004). Ninety Feet from Fame: Close Calls with Baseball Immortality (New York: Carroll & Graf). ISBN 0-7867-1335-6
- Schneider, Russell (2005). The Cleveland Indians Encyclopedia, 3d ed. (Champaign, Ill.: Sports Publishing LLC). ISBN 1-58261-840-2

Preceded by Steve Busby	No-hitter pitcher July 19, 1974	Succeeded by Nolan Ryan
Preceded by Dave Duncan	Chicago White Sox pitching coach 1986–1987	Succeeded by Don Rowe
Preceded by Al Jackson	Baltimore Orioles pitching coach 1992–1994	Succeeded by Mike Flanagan
Preceded by Claude Osteen	Texas Rangers pitching coach 1995–2000	Succeeded by Bobby Cuellar
