= Cisco Carlos =

American baseball player (born 1940)

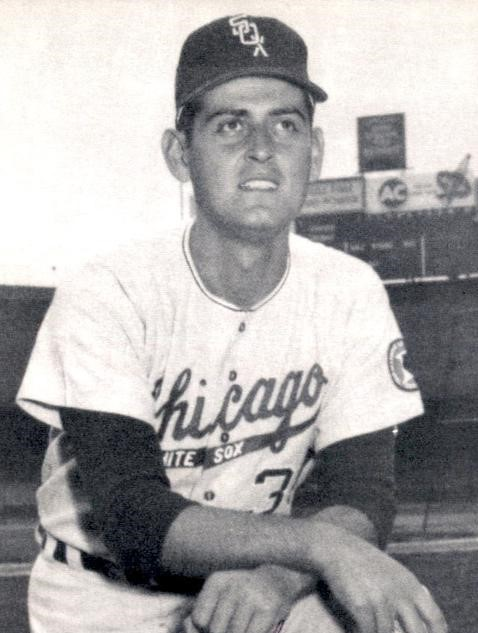
- Pitcher
- Born: September 17, 1940 (age 85); Monrovia, California, U.S.
- Batted: Right Threw: Right

MLB debut
- August 25, 1967, for the Chicago White Sox

Last MLB appearance
- September 27, 1970, for the Washington Senators

MLB statistics
- Win–loss record: 11–18
- earned run average: 3.72
- Strikeouts: 119
- Stats at Baseball Reference

Teams
- Chicago White Sox (1967–1969); Washington Senators (1969–1970)

Francisco Manuel Carlos Guzmán (born September 17, 1940) is an American former professional baseball pitcher. He played from 1967 through 1970 for the Chicago White Sox and Washington Senators of Major League Baseball (MLB). Listed at 6' 3", 205 lb., Carlos batted and threw right handed. He was born in Monrovia, California, of Mexican American descent.

== Amateur career ==
Carlos was a pitcher for the University of Northern Colorado team that participated in the 1960 College World Series. He was signed by the White Sox as an amateur free agent in 1961 and spent the next six seasons in their farm system. After posting a 15–8 record in Double-A in 1966 and an 11–8 record with a 2.63 earned run average in Triple A in 1967, Carlos was called up to the Majors in late August.

== Professional career ==
That year, the White Sox were involved in a four-way American League pennant race with the Boston Red Sox, Detroit Tigers and Minnesota Twins. The White Sox were eliminated from the race in the final days of the season, but not before Carlos won two games to keep them in contention. On September 10 he defeated the Tigers 4–0 in the second game of a doubleheader at Comiskey Park, allowing four hits in six innings; the game came hours after Joe Horlen's no-hitter over the Tigers in the first game. Four days later, Carlos shut out the Cleveland Indians 4–0 in ten innings, the ChiSox winning the game on Don Buford's grand slam in the bottom of the tenth.

Carlos was featured along with future Hall-of-Famer Johnny Bench on the front cover of Sports Illustrated as one of "The Best Rookies of 1968." However, in this, the "Year of the Pitcher", he posted a 4–14 record with a 3.90 earned run average—almost a full run above the league average of 2.98. Carlos pitched mostly in relief in 1969 and, after posting a 4–3 record with a 5.66 ERA, was purchased by the Washington Senators on August 25, two years to the day of his Major League debut.

After pitching in five games in 1970, Carlos was sent to the minors and spent the rest of his professional career there. He posted a 13–9 record with the Senators' Triple A club, the Denver Bears of the American Association. He posted a 14–20 record over the next two years and retired after pitching in the Houston Astros farm system in 1973 (the Bears, for whom Carlos pitched at the beginning of the season, were now the Astros' Triple A affiliate).

In his MLB career, Carlos posted an 11–18 record with 119 strikeouts and a 3.72 ERA in 237 innings.

== Personal ==
Following his baseball retirement, Carlos founded Cabinets by Design, a family owned kitchen, bath and storage design and renovation firm located at Phoenix and Scottsdale in Arizona, which has provided its services for more than 25 years.
