= Shelby Whitfield =

Whitfield

Shelby Aldwin Whitfield (April 13, 1935 – February 5, 2013) was an American play-by-play sports announcer, author and sports director for ABC Radio.

== Early life and career ==
Whitfield was born in Frost, Texas. He attended the University of Texas. He announced games and did play-by-play coverage for the Plainview Ponies, a minor league team based in Plainview, Texas. He joined the Army in 1955 and became the sports director of American Forces Network within two years. He was a Specialist Fifth Class.

== Washington Senators announcing career ==
Whitfield was a play-by-play announcer for the Washington Senators in 1969 and 1970.

== Kiss It Goodbye ==
After Senators owner Robert E. Short moved the team to Texas after the 1971 season, to become the Texas Rangers, Whitfield wrote a book called Kiss It Goodbye, which was highly critical of the franchise and its management. The book helped prompt the Federal Communications Commission to investigate the ethics of sports broadcasting.

== Post-Senators career ==
Following his tenure with the Senators, Whitfield worked for WWDC, hosting the talk show "Sports Roundtable."

In 1974, he joined Associated Press Radio, where he served as the sports director for seven years. Following his tenure there, he joined ABC Radio as its sports director in 1981. In that role, he oversaw coverage of multiple notable sporting events, including the Olympics.

In 1991, he collaborated with sports journalist and announcer Howard Cosell on a book called What's Wrong With Sports.

He retired in 1997. He died in Jackson, New Jersey at the age of 77 from complications from diabetes.
