= Joe Grzenda =

American baseball player (1937–2019)

- Pitcher
- Born: June 8, 1937; Scranton, Pennsylvania, U.S.
- Died: July 12, 2019 (aged 82); Covington Township, Pennsylvania, U.S.
- Batted: Right Threw: Left

MLB debut
- April 26, 1961, for the Detroit Tigers

Last MLB appearance
- September 23, 1972, for the St. Louis Cardinals

MLB statistics
- Win–loss record: 14–13
- Earned run average: 4.00
- Strikeouts: 173
- Stats at Baseball Reference

Teams
- Detroit Tigers (1961); Kansas City Athletics (1964, 1966); New York Mets (1967); Minnesota Twins (1969); Washington Senators (1970–1971); St. Louis Cardinals (1972)

Joseph Charles Grzenda (June 8, 1937 – July 12, 2019) was an American professional baseball relief pitcher. He played in Major League Baseball (MLB) for eight seasons (1961; 1964–1967; 1969–1972) for the Detroit Tigers, Kansas City Athletics, New York Mets, Minnesota Twins, Washington Senators and St. Louis Cardinals. Born in Scranton, Pennsylvania, he stood 6 feet 2 inches (1.88 m) tall and weighed 180 pounds (82 kg). His professional career lasted for 20 seasons (1955–1974) and included 492 appearances in the minor leagues.

== Career ==
Grzenda was a left-handed sidearm pitcher who pitched in 219 Major League games, all but three games as a relief pitcher. His best season statistics-wise was in 1971 for the Washington Senators, when he earned five victories with an excellent 1.92 earned run average (ERA). All told, he posted a 14–13 won–lost record and an even 4.00 earned run average in the big leagues, with 14 saves. In 308 innings pitched, he surrendered 323 hits and 120 bases on balls, and notched 173 strikeouts.

Not known for his hitting ability, Grzenda once grounded out to third base in RFK Stadium and received a standing ovation. On September 30, 1971, he became the last pitcher in the franchise's tenure at Washington, D.C., getting two outs in the top of the ninth inning before fans, knowing the team would be leaving for Dallas–Fort Worth after the season to become the Texas Rangers, stormed the RFK Stadium field, causing a forfeit. Thirty-four years later, when baseball returned to the nation's capital, Grzenda returned to the RFK field before the Washington Nationals' first home game, handing George W. Bush the ball he would use to throw out the first pitch.

As a fielder, Grzenda was charged with no errors during his eight-year career for a perfect 1.000 fielding percentage (6 putouts, 66 assists). In 1969 he made an appearance in the ALCS for the Minnesota Twins.

Grzenda died at his home in Covington Township, Pennsylvania, on July 12, 2019.
