= Greg Goossen =

American baseball player (1945-2011)

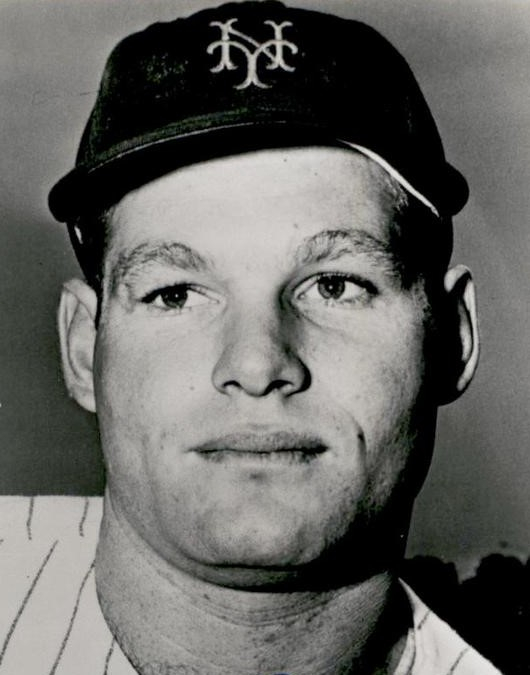
- Catcher
- Born: December 14, 1945; Los Angeles, California, U.S.
- Died: February 26, 2011 (aged 65); Sherman Oaks, California, U.S.
- Batted: Right Threw: Right

MLB debut
- September 3, 1965, for the New York Mets

Last MLB appearance
- October 1, 1970, for the Washington Senators

MLB statistics
- Batting average: .241
- Home runs: 13
- Runs batted in: 44
- Stats at Baseball Reference

Teams
- New York Mets (1965–1968); Seattle Pilots / Milwaukee Brewers (1969–1970); Washington Senators (1970)

Gregory Bryant Goossen (December 14, 1945 – February 26, 2011) was an American professional baseball player and stand-in actor in the American film industry. He played in Major League Baseball as a catcher and first baseman from 1965 to 1974 for the New York Mets, Seattle Pilots / Milwaukee Brewers and the Washington Senators. He was the brother of Ten Goose Boxing founders Dan and Joe Goossen. After his athletic career, Goosen worked in the American film industry as a stand-in for actor Gene Hackman.

== Career ==
Born in Los Angeles, Goossen was the fourth member of a family of eight brothers and two sisters. He was a standout football and basketball player at Notre Dame High School in Sherman Oaks, California, where he graduated in 1964.

Following his graduation, the Los Angeles Dodgers signed Goossen for a six-figure bonus. He spent 1964 in the minor leagues playing first base with the Dodgers rookie-level Pioneer League team, the Pocatello Chiefs and then their single-A Florida State League team, the St. Petersburg Saints. After accepting an invitation to spring training from the Dodgers, he spent the pre-season sharing a locker with future Hall of Famers Sandy Koufax and Don Drysdale who were on their way to winning the 1965 World Series. On April 9, the woeful New York Mets selected the 19-year-old Goossen through the first-year waiver process. Mets manager Casey Stengel, evidently less than impressed with his new player, infamously quoted "This is Greg Goossen. He's 19 years old, and in 10 years . . . he's got a chance to be 29." Needing players, the Mets promoted the former bonus baby directly to the majors. Goossen batted .290 in 11 games as part of a catching group that included Chris Cannizzaro, Jesse Gonder, John Stephenson and Yogi Berra before being assigned for the rest of the season to single-A Auburn in the New York–Penn League.

Goossen would spend four years in the Mets organization, playing in both the minors and major league each season. On May 31, 1968, Goossen broke up a possible perfect game by St. Louis Cardinals' pitcher Larry Jaster, hitting a single with two outs in the bottom of the eighth inning. In his four years with the organization he would play 99 games in the majors, and 430 in the minors (with all but 40 minor league games at AAA Jacksonville). On February 5, 1969, New York traded him along with cash to the Seattle Pilots for a player to be named later (on July 14 the Pilots sent outfielder/first baseman Jim Gosger to the Mets to close the deal). Although Goossen again missed out on the possibility of getting a World Series ring, this time with the Miracle Mets, he got the only extended playing time in his career when he was called up by Seattle on July 25, platooning as the right-handed bat opposite lefty Don Mincher at first base. Goossen posted career high numbers in average (.309), home runs (10), runs batted in (24), at bats (139), and games played (52), while catching and playing first base and left field.

After starting the 1970 season as the now Milwaukee Brewers' first baseman, Goossen's production tailed off badly, and he was sent to AAA Portland after hitting only .255 with one home run over the first 21 games. On July 14, the Washington Senators purchased Goossen from the Brewers and he spent the rest of the season in Washington playing for Hall of Famer Ted Williams, but he hit an empty .222 with no homers and one RBI and only three extra base hits in what would be his final taste of the major leagues. On November 3, 1970, Goossen was sent to the Philadelphia Phillies with left fielder Gene Martin and relief pitcher Jeff Terpko for a player to be named later and Curt Flood, whose lawsuit for free agency was pending against Major League Baseball (on April 10, the Phillies sent Terpko back to the Senators to complete the trade). Goossen spent the 1971 season playing for the AAA teams of three organizations, the Phillies, Chicago Cubs, and California Angels, before calling it a career following the end of the season at the age of 25.

== Retirement ==
After his baseball retirement, Goossen helped his brother Dan, who owned Ten Goose Professional Boxing along with his brothers, as a boxing trainer. Notable boxers he worked with included Rick Lindland, an amateur boxer-turned-actor, and 1980s middleweight champion Michael Nunn.

While at the gym in 1988, his brother Joe asked him to meet with actor Gene Hackman, who was doing research for the film Split Decisions. Soon afterward the two became friends, and the actor hired Goossen to work as his stand-in. Hackman had written into his contracts that Goossen would serve as his stand-in for every film he did. In addition to his stand in work, Goossen was also often cast in bit roles in Hackman films -- Goossen appeared in 15 of Hackman's movies between 1989 and 2003, including Unforgiven, The Firm, Get Shorty and Wyatt Earp.

Goossen was a regular at his nephew's baseball games. His nephew, Josh Goossen-Brown, was drafted by the Chicago White Sox in the 31st round (918th overall) of the 2014 MLB draft. Goossen was scheduled to be inducted into the Notre Dame High School Hall of Fame on February 26, 2011, but died from a stroke that day at the age of 65.

== Filmography ==
Year	Title	Role	Notes
1989	The Package	Soldier in Provost Marshal's Office	with Gene Hackman
1990	Loose Cannons	Marsh Policeman	with Gene Hackman
1991	Class Action	Bartender at Rosatti's	with Gene Hackman
1992	Unforgiven	Fighter	with Gene Hackman
1992	Mr. Baseball	Trey	
1993	The Firm	Vietnam Veteran	with Gene Hackman
1993	Geronimo: An American Legend	Schoonover Gang #1	with Gene Hackman
1994	Wyatt Earp	Friend of Bullwacker	with Gene Hackman
1995	The Quick and the Dead	Young Herod's Man #1	with Gene Hackman
1995	Waterworld	Sawzall Smoker	
1995	Get Shorty	Duke, Man at the Ivy	with Gene Hackman
1996	The Chamber	J.B. Gullitt	with Gene Hackman
1997	Midnight in the Garden of Good and Evil	Prison Cell Lunatic	
2000	The Replacements	Drunk #2	with Gene Hackman
2001	Heist	Officer #1	with Gene Hackman
2001	The Royal Tenenbaums	Gypsy Cab Driver	with Gene Hackman
2001	Behind Enemy Lines	CIA Spook	with Gene Hackman
2003	N.B.T.	Pat	(final film role)
