= Hank Allen =

American baseball player (1940–2024)

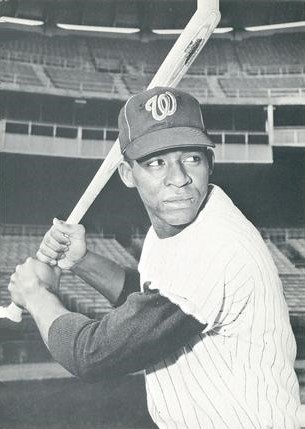
- Outfielder
- Born: July 23, 1940; Wampum, Pennsylvania, U.S.
- Died: May 29, 2024 (aged 83); Bethesda, Maryland, U.S.
- Batted: Right Threw: Right

MLB debut
- September 9, 1966, for the Washington Senators

Last MLB appearance
- September 28, 1973, for the Chicago White Sox

MLB statistics
- Batting average: .241
- Home runs: 6
- Runs batted in: 57
- Stats at Baseball Reference

Teams
- Washington Senators (1966–1970); Milwaukee Brewers (1970); Chicago White Sox (1972–1973)

Harold Andrew "Hank" Allen (July 23, 1940 – May 29, 2024) was an American professional baseball player who appeared in Major League Baseball, primarily as an outfielder, for the Washington Senators (1966–1970), Milwaukee Brewers (1970) and Chicago White Sox (1972–1973).

== Early life ==
Born in Wampum, Pennsylvania, Allen was the elder brother of Dick Allen, a seven-time All-Star, 1964 National League Rookie of the Year and 1972 American League Most Valuable Player, and Ron Allen, who had a brief MLB career. As of September 2006, the Allen brothers ranked 11th in the MLB brother-combination, home run list with 358 dingers (out of more than 350 combinations all-time).

== Career ==
Hank Allen (like each of his brothers) signed his first professional contract with the Philadelphia Phillies. After five years (1960–1964) in the Phillie farm system his contract was sold to the Senators in January 1965. In his first taste of big-league service, in September 1966, he posted a .387 batting average, with 12 hits in 31 at bats. But he was never able to win a regular job. In his Major League career, he also played third base, second base, and first base, and even made one appearance as a catcher. As an outfielder, he was just fair defensively, making 16 errors in 374 total chances for a .957 fielding percentage. His most productive full season came in 1969 for the Senators, when he posted career highs in batting average (.277), runs (42), hits (75) and RBI (17). He was dealt along with minor-league infielder John Ryan from the Brewers to the Atlanta Braves for Bob Tillman at the Winter Meetings on December 2, 1970. He spent parts of the 1968 and 1970 seasons, and all of 1971, in the minor leagues. He was a teammate of Dick Allen's on the 1972 and 1973 White Sox.

In his seven-season big-league career, Allen was a .241 hitter with 6 home runs, 57 RBI, and 104 runs in 389 games played. Allen led several leagues in his time, including the Pioneer League in RBIs (140) and batting average (.346), the Pacific Coast League with 288 total bases while playing for the Hawaii Islanders in 1966, and tied for the league lead in hits (176) and home runs (37) while playing for the Magic Valley Cowboys in 1962.

Allen died in Bethesda, Maryland, on May 29, 2024, at the age of 83.

== Thoroughbred racing ==
After his baseball playing career, Hank Allen became involved as a trainer/owner in Thoroughbred horse racing, based at Laurel Park and Pimlico Race Courses in Maryland. In 1989, he became the first African-American trainer in seventy-eight years to saddle a horse in the Kentucky Derby when Northern Wolf ran sixth to winner Sunday Silence. In June 1990, he conditioned Northern Wolf when the horse set a new Laurel Park track record of 1:08 4/5 for six furlongs while winning the Duck Dance Handicap. Two months later Northern Wolf set a new Pimlico track record of 1:09 flat for the same six furlong distance in winning the Frank J. De Francis Memorial Dash Stakes.

Allen remained in baseball as a scout, latterly serving the Houston Astros at the professional level and based in Upper Marlboro, Maryland.
