= Sid Hudson =

American baseball player (1915–2008)

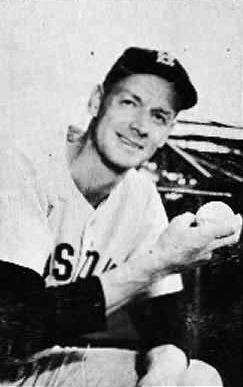
- Pitcher
- Born: January 3, 1915; Coalfield, Tennessee, U.S.
- Died: October 10, 2008 (aged 93); Waco, Texas, U.S.
- Batted: Right Threw: Right

MLB debut
- April 18, 1940, for the Washington Senators

Last MLB appearance
- September 25, 1954, for the Boston Red Sox

MLB statistics
- Win–loss record: 104–152
- Earned run average: 4.28
- Strikeouts: 734
- Stats at Baseball Reference

Teams
- Washington Senators (1940–1942, 1946–1952); Boston Red Sox (1952–1954)

Career highlights and awards
- 2× All-Star (1941, 1942)

Sidney Charles Hudson (January 3, 1915 – October 10, 2008) was an American starting pitcher in Major League Baseball who played for the Washington Senators (1940–42, 1946–52) and Boston Red Sox (1952–54) who had a lengthy post-playing career as a pitching coach and scout. Born in Coalfield, Tennessee, he batted and threw right-handed, stood 6 feet 4 inches (1.93 m) tall and weighed 180 pounds (82 kg).

== Biography ==
Hudson entered baseball in 1938 with the Class D Sanford Lookouts, who had a working agreement with the Senators. In his second year with Sanford, Hudson led the Florida State League in games won (24), winning percentage (24–4, .857), earned run average (1.79) and strikeouts (192). The following year, he won 17 games for a second-division Washington team as a rookie, and he was selected to the American League All–Star team in both 1941 and 1942. He appeared in the 1941 midsummer classic on July 8 at Briggs Stadium and worked the seventh inning, allowing a two-run home run to Arky Vaughan that put the rival National League ahead, 3–2. (The American League would triumph in the ninth inning, however, on a three-run, walk-off homer by Ted Williams).

Hudson's career was interrupted by three years (1943–45) of military service during World War II. A veteran of the United States Army Air Forces, he served in the Pacific Theater of Operations and attained the rank of sergeant. Pitching for Washington's struggling late-1940s teams, he led the American League in games lost (17) in 1949. On April 27, 1947, Hudson was the starting pitcher against the New York Yankees on Babe Ruth Day at Yankee Stadium. In front of 58,000 fans in one of Ruth's last public appearances, Hudson threw a complete game, 1–0 shutout, scattering eight hits and three bases on balls. He was traded to the rebuilding Red Sox in the middle of the 1952 campaign, and went 16–22 as a spot starter and reliever over 21/2 years.

He retired from the field after the 1954 campaign. In his 12-season MLB career, Hudson posted a 104–152 record with 734 strikeouts, 123 complete games, 11 shutouts, 13 saves, and a 4.28 earned run average in 2,181 innings pitched. He allowed 2,384 hits and 835 bases on balls. A good-hitting pitcher, he batted .220 with 164 hits and 75 runs batted in during his big-league tenure.

Following his pitching career, he scouted for the Red Sox from 1955 through 1960, then joined the expansion edition of the Senators in 1961 as the team's first pitching coach. He spent all or parts of 13 years over three different terms (1961–April 1965; 1968–1972; and mid-1975–1978) in that role for the franchise in both Washington and Dallas–Fort Worth, where it moved in 1972 to become the Texas Rangers. In between those assignments, Hudson served the team as a minor league pitching instructor. After leaving professional baseball in 1985, he was a pitching coach for Baylor University's varsity baseball team.

At the time of his death, at 93 years of age, Hudson was one of the oldest living major league players. He died in Waco, Texas.

== Highlights ==
- Twice American League All-Stars (1941–42)
- As a rookie in 1940, won 17 games and pitched two one-hitters, and was runner-up rookie of the year
- Was fourth in wins (17) and in shutouts (5), fifth in home runs allowed (20), and third in hits allowed (272), in the American League in 1940

| Preceded by Franchise established Rube Walker | Washington Senators pitching coach 1961–1965; 1968–1971 | Succeeded by Rube Walker; Franchise transferred |
| Preceded by Franchise transferred Art Fowler | Texas Rangers pitching coach 1972; 1975–1978 | Succeeded by Chuck Estrada; Jackie Brown |
