= Barry Moore (baseball) =

American baseball player (born 1943)

- Pitcher
- Born: April 3, 1943 (age 83); Statesville, North Carolina, U.S.
- Batted: Left Threw: Left

MLB debut
- May 29, 1965, for the Washington Senators

Last MLB appearance
- October 1, 1970, for the Chicago White Sox

MLB statistics
- Win–loss record: 26–37
- Earned run average: 4.16
- Strikeouts: 278
- Stats at Baseball Reference

Teams
- Washington Senators (1965–1969); Cleveland Indians (1970); Chicago White Sox (1970)

Robert Barry Moore (born April 3, 1943) is an American former Major League Baseball pitcher. The left-hander was signed by the Washington Senators as an amateur free agent before the 1962 season and played for the Senators (1965–1969), Cleveland Indians (1970) and Chicago White Sox (1970).

== Career ==
Moore led the Eastern League with 155 bases on balls (in 165 innings) while playing for the York White Roses in 1964.

Moore made his major league debut in relief on May 29, 1965 against the Minnesota Twins. He entered the game in the top of the 9th with the Senators behind, 10-7, and gave up one unearned run in his one inning of work. Washington scored a run in the bottom of the inning, and the game ended, 11-8. He earned his first big league win on July 23, 1966 by pitching a three-hit complete game against the Kansas City Athletics in front of a home crowd of only 2,777. The score was 8-1.

His finest major league effort was against the Twins on April 30, 1967 (Game # 2). He pitched a one-hit complete game shutout at D.C. Stadium that day, walking only two batters. The Twins had such players as César Tovar, Rod Carew, Harmon Killebrew, Bob Allison, and Zoilo Versalles in the lineup, but Moore was almost untouchable. Tovar got the only Minnesota hit, a 6th-inning single, as the Senators won 3-0. This time there were 18,555 in attendance. On May 30, 1967 he gave up Jim "Catfish" Hunter's first major league home run.

Even though he pitched just 141 innings in 1970, Moore tied for third among American League hurlers with 9 hit batsmen. By contrast, it took the other four pitchers who were tied with him for third an average of 240.1 innings to hit the same number of batters. He was traded along with Bob Miller from the Indians to the White Sox for Buddy Bradford and Tommie Sisk before the trade deadline on June 15, 1970. After a 3–9 campaign with a 5.30 earned run average (ERA), he was dealt from the White Sox to the New York Yankees for Bill Robinson on December 3, 1970.

Moore did have a tendency to be wild, as he gave up 300 walks in just 599.2 innings pitched, for a BB/9IP of 4.50, much higher than the American League average at that time. Often, a pitcher who walks a lot of batters strikes out a lot, too, but that wasn't the case with Moore. With 278 strikeouts, his K/9IP was 4.17, which was lower than the American League average.

Career totals for 143 games played (140 as a pitcher) include a 26-37 record, 99 games started, 8 complete games, 1 shutout, 14 games finished, and 3 saves. He allowed 277 earned runs in his 599.2 innings, giving him a lifetime ERA of 4.16.

== Bibliography ==
- 1968 Baseball Register published by The Sporting News
