= Darold Knowles =

American baseball player (born 1941)

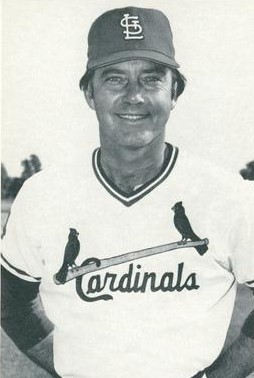
- Pitcher
- Born: December 9, 1941 (age 84); Brunswick, Missouri, U.S.
- Batted: Left Threw: Left

MLB debut
- April 18, 1965, for the Baltimore Orioles

Last MLB appearance
- April 18, 1980, for the St. Louis Cardinals

MLB statistics
- Win–loss record: 66–74
- Earned run average: 3.12
- Strikeouts: 681
- Saves: 143
- Stats at Baseball Reference

Teams
- Baltimore Orioles (1965); Philadelphia Phillies (1966); Washington Senators (1967–1971); Oakland Athletics (1971–1974); Chicago Cubs (1975–1976); Texas Rangers (1977); Montreal Expos (1978); St. Louis Cardinals (1979–1980)

Career highlights and awards
- All-Star (1969); 2× World Series champion (1973, 1974)

Darold Duane Knowles (born December 9, 1941) is an American former professional baseball player and coach. He played in Major League Baseball as a left-handed pitcher from 1965 through 1980, most prominently as a member of the Oakland Athletics dynasty that won three consecutive World Series championships between 1972 and 1974. In the 1973 World Series, Knowles became the first pitcher to appear in all seven games of a World Series. He also played for the Baltimore Orioles, Philadelphia Phillies, Washington Senators / Texas Rangers, Chicago Cubs, Montreal Expos, and St. Louis Cardinals. Knowles batted and threw left-handed. He served as a pitching coach or pitching rehabilitation coordinator from 1981 to 2020, at the major or minor league levels.

== Early life ==
Knowles was born on December 9, 1941, in Brunswick, Missouri, the son of Verna and Ralph Knowles. He attended Brunswick High School. He played in the Kansas City area summer collegiate-level Ban Johnson League, and once struck out either 32 or 33 batters in a 13-inning win (1–0) in a league game. In July–September 1960, he led all Ban Johnson Central Missouri Eastern Division pitchers with 83 strikeouts in 55.1 innings pitched, and had a 15–2 won–loss record. His Ban Johnson teams won consecutive state championships.

Knowles attended the University of Missouri, but left school to sign with the Baltimore Orioles in February 1961.

== Playing career ==
=== Baltimore Orioles ===
Knowles spent five seasons in the Orioles farm system (1961, Aberdeen; 1962–63, Elmira; 1962, Stockton; 1964–65, Rochester), with a short six game stint in 1962 on the Minnesota Twins affiliate Charlotte Hornets of the South Atlantic League. He was mostly utilized as a starting pitcher, though he did pitch 47 games in relief. In his five-year minor league career, Knowles had a 56–33 won–loss record, with a 2.77 earned run averaged (ERA), striking out 799 batters in 852 innings pitched.

He played under future hall of fame manager Earl Weaver at Elmira, where some of his teammates included Dave McNally, Mark Belanger, Davey Johnson, and future hall of fame executive Pat Gillick. Years later, Weaver told Knowles that Knowles' success under Weaver was one of the reasons Weaver made it to the major leagues.

In between, Knowles played winter ball with the Tiburones de La Guaira club of the Venezuelan League in the 1964–1965 season, where he posted a 13–9 record with a 2.37 ERA and 155 strikeouts to earn Triple Crown honors.

Knowles made his debut with the Orioles on April 18, 1965, pitching 1.2 innings out of the bullpen, and giving up five earned runs before returning to the Triple-A Rochester Red Wings, where he had an 11–5 record, 2.53 ERA and 155 strikeouts in 174 innings pitched. Upon completion of the International League (IL) season, Knowles received a September call back up to Baltimore. He went 0–1 with a 6.92 ERA in his return. The loss came against the Detroit Tigers, in Knowles’ only start.

=== Philadelphia Phillies ===
Knowles was traded with Jackie Brandt to the Phillies for Jack Baldschun on December 6, 1965. He won the season opener against the St. Louis Cardinals, pitching six innings of one-run ball as a relief pitcher to earn his first career win. His first career save came on May 12 against the Los Angeles Dodgers. For the 1966 season, Knowles earned 13 saves. His 69 appearances, all in relief, were the third highest total of any pitcher in the league. At the end of his only season in Philadelphia, he was traded to the Washington Senators for Don Lock.

=== Washington Senators ===
Knowles began earning a reputation as a work-horse relief pitcher, as he was used 61 times by manager Gil Hodges in 1967. He had a 2.70 ERA in 113.1 innings with 14 saves. In an August 9, 1967 game against the Twins, Knowles came in to pitch in the eighth inning of what would become a 20-inning game. He pitched ten innings of shutout baseball through the 17th inning. He allowed only three hits and struck out 10 Twins.

He was used 32 times in 1968, with a 2.18 ERA and four saves, when his season was cut short by President Lyndon B. Johnson's reserve call-up of the USAF's 113th Tactical Fighter Wing in which he was an airman first class. He returned to the Senators in May 1969, and went 4–1 with four saves and a 2.01 ERA to earn his only career All-Star nod. He finished the 1969 season with a career best 9–2 record, with a 2.24 ERA and 13 saves in 53 games. This was Knowles only season with the Senators where the team finished above .500.

Despite a 2–14 record in 1970, Knowles enjoyed career highs in saves (27), appearances (71) and innings pitched (119.1), and had a 2.04 ERA. The 1970 team was 70–92, finishing last in the American League East division. During his time with Senators, the team only finished above .500 once. He played under manager and Hall of Fame great Ted Williams in 1969 and 1970, who thought Knowles was the best relief pitcher in the major leagues.

=== Oakland A's ===
On May 8, 1971, the American League West first-place Oakland Athletics acquired Knowles and Mike Epstein for Frank Fernandez, Paul Lindblad, and Don Mincher. Knowles only allowed four of 35 inherited runners to score, and earned seven saves and five wins out of a bullpen that already included Rollie Fingers and Bob Locker. The A's won the American League West by 16 games over the Kansas City Royals, but were swept by the Baltimore Orioles in the 1971 American League Championship Series. Knowles' only series appearance came in game three.

In 1972, Knowles went 5–1 with a 1.37 ERA and 11 saves, but he was lost for the postseason due to a broken thumb. In 1972, the A's won the first of their three consecutive World Series championships (1972–1974).

==== 1973 World Series ====
Knowles made five starts for the world champion A's in 1973, pitching his only complete game shutout against the Boston Red Sox on August 14. He threw 47 games in relief. The Athletics repeated as American League champions, and faced the New York Mets in the 1973 World Series. Knowles appeared in all seven games of the World Series, pitching 6 1/3 innings without giving up an earned run, and earning the saves in games one and seven. With two outs in the ninth inning of Game 7, manager Dick Williams brought Knowles in to replace future Hall of Fame relief pitcher Rollie Fingers. Knowles got the final out to seal the A's World Series victory. Knowles considers this the most memorable moment of his career.

He is one of only two pitchers to appear in all seven games of a World Series (the other pitcher being Brandon Morrow; in 2017, coincidentally, Knowles was the pitching coach at High-A Dunedin, the Toronto Blue Jays' Florida State League affiliate, when Morrow was a prospect with the club).

In his 1980 autobiography, Athletics manager Alvin Dark recalled that Knowles "was having a bad year" in 1974. In one game where Knowles struggled, Dark came to the mound to remove him from the game. Knowles argued with him on the mound, protesting that he would not get in shape unless he was able to pitch him more often. "Why don't you trade me?" he asked Dark when they got back to the dugout. "Because nobody wants you, that's why!" Dark retorted. Knowles went 3–3 with a 4.22 ERA and blowing two of his five save opportunities. His .296 batting average against was the highest in the Oakland bullpen. Regardless, the A's won their third World Series in a row in 1974; however, Knowles did not make a post-season appearance. Shortly after the World Series, he, Bob Locker and Manny Trillo were dealt to the Chicago Cubs for Billy Williams.

=== Final years ===
Knowles inherited the closer role in Chicago, saving 15 in 1975 and nine in 1976. Shortly before spring training 1977, Knowles was dealt to the Rangers for a player to be named later (Gene Clines) and cash. He went 5–2 with a 3.22 ERA and four saves to help the Rangers to a second-place finish. After the season, he was reunited with his former A's manager Dick Williams when his contract was sold to the Expos. He appeared in 60 games with the Expos, going 3–3 with six saves and a 2.38 ERA.

Knowles did not enjoy playing in Canada, citing taxes, language problems and political unrest in Quebec as the reasons for his displeasure. After just one season in Montreal, the Expos granted him free agency in late 1978, and Knowles signed a two-year deal with his home team Cardinals.

Knowles made 48 appearances and earned six saves with the Cards in 1979. He made just two appearances in April 1980 before retiring and accepting a coaching position in the Cardinals' farm system. At the time of his retirement, he was tied for 13th in career saves. Through 2024, he is tied for 100th in career saves. The standards for awarding saves became less stringent since Knowles first started pitching.

== Coaching career ==
Knowles served eight years as a minor league roving pitching coach for the Cardinals (1981–1988), with a short stint as the Cardinals pitching coach in 1983. In 1989, Knowles was hired as the Philadelphia Phillies pitching coach by the team's new general manager Lee Thomas, who had been director of the Cardinals' minor league system. Nick Leyva, also formerly with the Cardinals coaching staff, became the Phillies new manager the same year.

The 1989 Phillies had a record of 67–95–1. Under Knowles, the Phillies' pitching staff had a National League worst 4.04 ERA. The team showed improvement the next year (77–85), though the team ERA was 4.09, still surpassing three other National League teams. After the 1990 season, the Phillies moved Knowles to a minor league pitching coach position with the Clearwater Threshers in the Florida State League, where he served for a decade. Leyva was fired 13 games into the 1991 season.

In 2001, Knowles became the pitching coach for the Nashville Sounds, Triple-A affiliate of the Pittsburgh Pirates, and coached on that team until at least 2003. In 2005, he was pitching coach for the Triple-A Indianapolis Indians of the International League, who had become affiliated with the Pirates, with the Sounds switching their affiliation to the Milwaukee Brewers in 2005.

In 2006, Knowles was named as the pitching coach for the Toronto Blue Jays Single-A affiliate Dunedin Blue Jays in the Florida State League, replacing the 2005 coach Rick Langford. Knowles continued coaching with Dunedin for many years, later becoming the Blue Jays rehab pitching coordinator. His final year as the Blue Jays rehab coordinator was 2020.

== Honors ==
Knowles was named to the Florida State League Baseball Hall of Fame in 2012 for his coaching at Clearwater and Dunedin.

In 2012, Knowles was inducted into the Missouri Sports Hall of Fame.

== See also ==
- List of Major League Baseball career saves leaders

Preceded by Claude Osteen	Philadelphia Phillies pitching coach 1989–1990	Succeeded by Johnny Podres
