= Casey Cox =

American baseball player (1941–2023)

- Pitcher
- Born: July 3, 1941; Long Beach, California, U.S.
- Died: October 2, 2023 (aged 82); Clearwater, Florida, U.S.
- Batted: Right Threw: Right

MLB debut
- April 15, 1966, for the Washington Senators

Last MLB appearance
- April 6, 1973, for the New York Yankees

MLB statistics
- Win–loss record: 39–42
- Earned run average: 3.70
- Strikeouts: 297
- Stats at Baseball Reference

Teams
- Washington Senators / Texas Rangers (1966–1972); New York Yankees (1972–1973)

Joseph Casey Cox (July 3, 1941 – October 2, 2023) was an American professional baseball player who pitched in the Major Leagues between 1966 and 1973 for the Washington Senators/Texas Rangers and New York Yankees. A right-hander, he was listed as 6 feet 5 inches (1.96 m) tall and 200 pounds (91 kg). He was born in Long Beach, California, and attended Long Beach City College and California State University, Los Angeles.

Cox entered baseball in 1962 as a member of the Cincinnati Reds' organization, then was drafted in successive years by the Cleveland Indians (1963) and Senators (1964). In the majors, he was essentially a relief pitcher, coming out of the bullpen in all but 59 of his 308 career MLB games pitched. In 1966, as a rookie, he appeared in a career-high 66 games and was credited with seven saves, also a personal best.

His finest season was 1969 — the 1961–1971 Senators' only winning campaign in 11 seasons in Washington. Working in 52 games, with 13 starts, he set career marks in games won (12) and earned run average (2.78, in 1712/3 innings pitched). He handled 32 chances in the field without an error, leading all American League pitchers in fielding percentage. He also threw a career-high four complete games. The following season, 1970, Cox was almost exclusively a starting pitcher. But he won only eight of 20 decisions and his ERA climbed to 4.45, as Washington faltered and finished last in the American League East. In 1971 he returned to the Senator bullpen and tied his career-best with seven saves, but Washington struggled again on the field and at the turnstiles, and the franchise was moved to Dallas–Fort Worth as the Texas Rangers during the offseason. In 1972, Cox appeared in 45 games for the first edition of the Rangers before his trade on August 31 to the Yankees.

Cox would pitch in only six total games for the Yankees, five at the tail end of 1972, and then on Opening Day 1973 at Fenway Park, when he worked three innings of mop-up relief in a 15–5 Red Sox victory that marked the first game in which a designated hitter was used in the American League. He retired from baseball after the 1973 campaign.

Over the course of Cox' MLB career, he posted a 39–42 won–lost record, 20 saves, five complete games, and an earned run average of 3.70. In 762 innings pitched, he permitted 772 hits and 234 bases on balls, with 297 strikeouts.

Casey Cox died in Clearwater, Florida, on October 2, 2023, at the age of 82.
