= Jackie Brown (baseball) =

American baseball player (1943–2017)

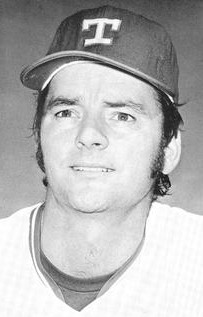
- Brown in 1974
- Pitcher
- Born: May 31, 1943; Holdenville, Oklahoma, U.S.
- Died: January 8, 2017 (aged 73); Holdenville, Oklahoma, U.S.
- Batted: Right Threw: Right

MLB debut
- July 2, 1970, for the Washington Senators

Last MLB appearance
- September 27, 1977, for the Montreal Expos

MLB statistics
- Win–loss record: 47–53
- Earned run average: 4.18
- Strikeouts: 516
- Stats at Baseball Reference

Teams
- As player: Washington Senators / Texas Rangers (1970–1971, 1973–1975); Cleveland Indians (1975–1976); Montreal Expos (1977); As coach: Texas Rangers (1979–1982); Chicago White Sox (1992–1995); Tampa Bay Devil Rays (2002)

Jackie Gene Brown (May 31, 1943 – January 8, 2017) was an American professional baseball pitcher and coach, who played in Major League Baseball (MLB) for the Washington Senators / Texas Rangers, Cleveland Indians, and Montreal Expos from 1970 –1977. Brown threw and batted right-handed. His older brother, Paul Brown, also pitched in the big leagues.

In 7 seasons he had a 47–53 win–loss record, 214 games (105 started), 26 complete games, 8 shutouts, 39 games finished, 3 saves, 892 2/3 innings pitched, 934 hits allowed, 460 runs allowed, 415 earned runs allowed, 82 home runs allowed, 353 walks, 516 strikeouts, 20 hit batsmen, 28 wild pitches, 3,865 batters faced, 24 intentional walks, 1 balk, a 4.18 earned run average (ERA), and a 1.442 WHIP.

Brown was dealt from the Indians to the Expos for Andre Thornton on December 10, 1976. In his final season, he was the winning pitcher on Opening Day, defeating Steve Carlton, in Philadelphia and also pitched in the first Expos game ever played at Olympic Stadium.

After his playing career, Brown was a pitching coach for the Texas Rangers (1979–82), Chicago White Sox (1992–95), and Tampa Bay Devil Rays (2002); he also was a minor league pitching coordinator and pitching coach in a number of organizations.

Preceded by Sid Hudson	Texas Rangers Pitching Coach; 1979–1982	Succeeded by Dick Such
Preceded by Sammy Ellis	Chicago White Sox Pitching Coach; 1992–1995	Succeeded by Mike Pazik
Preceded by Bill Fischer	Tampa Bay Devil Rays Pitching Coach; 2002	Succeeded by Chris Bosio
