= Bill Gogolewski =

American baseball player (born 1947)

- Pitcher
- Born: October 26, 1947 (age 78); Oshkosh, Wisconsin, U.S.
- Batted: Left Threw: Right

MLB debut
- September 3, 1970, for the Washington Senators

Last MLB appearance
- August 5, 1975, for the Chicago White Sox

MLB statistics
- Win–loss record: 15–24
- Earned run average: 4.02
- Strikeouts: 301
- Stats at Baseball Reference

Teams
- Washington Senators / Texas Rangers (1970–1973); Cleveland Indians (1974); Chicago White Sox (1975)

William Joseph Gogolewski (born October 26, 1947) is an American former Major League Baseball (MLB) pitcher who played a total of six seasons with the Washington Senators/Texas Rangers, Cleveland Indians and Chicago White Sox. Born in Oshkosh, Wisconsin, Gogolewski was listed as 6 feet 4 inches (1.93 m) tall and 190 pounds (86 kg).

The right-hander was selected by the Senators out of Oshkosh High School in the 18th round (343rd overall) of the first-ever MLB amateur entry draft in June, 1965. He made it to the majors in September 1970. During that month, he started five of eight games, winning two of four decisions. The 1971 campaign, the franchise's last in the Nation's Capital, was Gogolewski's best, going 6–5 in 17 starts with a 2.76 earned run average, the only time in his career that statistic would be under 4.00. While the team finished its first two Dallas–Fort Worth Metroplex seasons in the American League West cellar, his record fell to 4–11 in 1972. He surrendered the first-ever home run in Kauffman Stadium history to the Kansas City Royals' John Mayberry in the ballpark's inaugural in April 1973. He pitched the final four innings to preserve the victory in David Clyde's professional debut.

He was dealt to the Indians on March 23, 1974, to complete a prior trade that sent Steve Hargan to Texas. He signed with the White Sox on February 18, 1975, one week after Cleveland released him. A back injury led to the end of his career later that year.

In 144 MLB games pitched (with 44 starts), Gogolewski compiled a 15–24 record and a 4.02 ERA, with six complete games, two shutouts and ten saves. In 501 innings pitched, he allowed 496 hits and 200 bases on balls, with 301 strikeouts.

Gogolewski is currently the chairman of the Oshkosh advisory park board.
