= Joe Camacho (baseball) =

- Bench coach
- Born: May 29, 1928; New Bedford, Massachusetts, U.S.
- Died: December 27, 2018 (aged 90); Fairhaven, Massachusetts, U.S.
- Batted: Right Threw: Right
- Stats at Baseball Reference

Teams
- Washington Senators / Texas Rangers (1969–1972)

Joseph Gomes Camacho Jr. (May 29, 1928 – December 27, 2018) was an American infielder and coach in professional baseball. During his playing career, Camacho threw and batted right-handed, stood 6 feet (1.83 m) tall and weighed 185 pounds (84 kg). Born in New Bedford, Massachusetts, Camacho attended Bridgewater State College, where he received bachelor's and master's degrees in education.

== Baseball career ==
=== Minor league infielder ===
Camacho's professional playing career extended from 1948 through 1957, with two seasons (1951–52) missed due to military service during the Korean War. He spent most of his active career as a shortstop and second baseman in the Cleveland Indians' farm system, reaching the Double-A level with the Mobile Bears of the Southern Association in his final campaign. In 790 minor league games, he batted .285 with 52 home runs.

=== MLB coach ===
Camacho spent 1958 through 1968 out of professional baseball, working as a teacher and high school baseball coach and as a senior instructor with the Ted Williams Baseball Camp in Lakeville, Massachusetts. When Williams was named manager of the Washington Senators during the 1968–69 offseason, he called former Boston Red Sox teammate Johnny Pesky and invited Pesky to be his bench coach. But Pesky had just taken a job with the Red Sox' radio and television broadcast team and decided to honor his contract and remain in Boston. Williams then made Camacho his dugout aide.

Camacho worked at Williams' side for four seasons, three (1969–71) in Washington and one (1972) when the franchise became the Texas Rangers. Although Williams' first season as a manager was a rousing success, his 1970–72 teams finished last, or next-to-last, in their divisions.

== Off-field career ==
When Williams resigned as Texas' manager following the 1972 campaign, Camacho resumed his career as an educator (he was principal of New Bedford's Campbell Elementary School) and coach before his 1986 retirement.

Camacho died December 27, 2018.
