= Jim Shellenback =

American baseball player (born 1943)

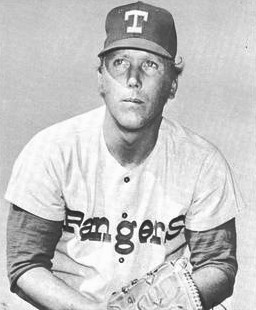
- Shellenback in 1974
- Pitcher
- Born: November 18, 1943 (age 82); Riverside, California, U.S.
- Batted: Left Threw: Left

MLB debut
- September 15, 1966, for the Pittsburgh Pirates

Last MLB appearance
- September 21, 1977, for the Minnesota Twins

MLB statistics
- Win–loss record: 16–30
- Earned run average: 3.81
- Strikeouts: 222
- Stats at Baseball Reference

Teams
- Pittsburgh Pirates (1966–1967, 1969); Washington Senators/Texas Rangers (1969–1974); Minnesota Twins (1977)

James Philip Shellenback (born November 18, 1943) is an American former professional baseball pitcher and coach. He appeared in 165 Major League games for the Pittsburgh Pirates (1966–1967; 1969), Washington Senators/Texas Rangers (1969–1974) and Minnesota Twins (1977). The 6 ft 2 in (1.88 m), 200 lb (91 kg) Shellenback threw and batted left-handed. He is the nephew of Frank Shellenback, also a former MLB pitcher and coach.

In his nine-year MLB career, he had a 16–30 record, 48 games started, eight complete games, two shutouts, 36 games finished, two saves, 454 innings pitched, 443 hits allowed, 228 runs allowed, 192 earned runs allowed, 40 home runs allowed, 200 bases on balls, 222 strikeouts, eight hit batsmen, six wild pitches, 1,960 batters faced, 14 intentional base on balls, two balks and a 3.81 earned run average.

Like his uncle, who won a record 295 games in the Pacific Coast League, Jim Shellenback had success in minor league baseball. In his second pro year, with the 1963 Gastonia Pirates, he won 17 of 20 decisions and posted a 2.03 earned run average. He won 103 minor league games over 12 seasons.

Shellenback was a longtime coach in the Twins' minor league system, and served on their Major League staff in 1983. He also managed the Triple-A Portland Beavers from June 22, 1988, through the end of the season after the resignation of Jim Mahoney. Late in his career, Shellenback was the pitching coach of the Rookie-level Elizabethton Twins of the Appalachian League for 18 consecutive seasons, from 1994 through his 2011 retirement.
