= Bill Haywood (baseball) =

Panamanian baseball player, coach, manager, and farm system official

- Pitcher
- Born: April 21, 1937 (age 89); Colón, Panama
- Batted: Right Threw: Right

MLB debut
- July 28, 1968, for the Washington Senators

Last MLB appearance
- September 11, 1968, for the Washington Senators

MLB statistics
- Win–loss record: 0–0
- Earned run average: 4.70
- Innings pitched: 23
- Stats at Baseball Reference

Teams
- Washington Senators (1968)

William Kiernan Haywood (born April 21, 1937) is an American former pitcher, coach, manager and farm system official in professional baseball. He was also a college baseball head coach. He threw and batted right-handed, stood 6 feet 3 inches (1.91 m) tall and weighed 205 pounds (93 kg).

== Career ==
Haywood was born in Colón, Panama. After serving in the United States Marine Corps, he enrolled in college at the relatively old age of 23, attending the University of North Carolina at Wilmington and the University of North Carolina at Chapel Hill.

Signing his first pro contract at age 27, he played his entire professional career for the Washington Senators' organization and appeared in 14 Major League Baseball games for the 1968 Senators, for whom he worked in 23 innings, allowed 27 hits and 12 bases on balls, registered ten strikeouts, and had an earned run average of 4.70. As a minor leaguer, he compiled a win–loss record of 47–37 with an earned run average of 3.03 in 165 games.

In 1969 he became the head baseball coach of Western Carolina University and later held the same position at Georgia Southwestern State University. He also served in professional baseball as a minor league coach and manager for the Senators/Texas Rangers franchise and as field coordinator and assistant player development director for the Seattle Mariners.
