= Jim French (baseball) =

American baseball player (born 1941)

- Catcher
- Born: August 13, 1941 (age 84); Warren, Ohio, U.S.
- Batted: Left Threw: Right

MLB debut
- September 12, 1965, for the Washington Senators

Last MLB appearance
- May 14, 1971, for the Washington Senators

MLB statistics
- Batting average: .196
- Home runs: 5
- Runs batted in: 51
- Stats at Baseball Reference

Teams
- Washington Senators (1965–1971)

Richard James French (born August 13, 1941) is an American former catcher in Major League Baseball who played between 1965 and 1971 for the Washington Senators. Listed at 5' 7", 182 lb., French batted left-handed and threw right-handed. He was born in Warren, Ohio, and was signed by Washington in 1963 out of Ohio University.

The Washington pitchers liked French behind the plate for the way he called games and by his strong arm and defensive skills. The Senators hoped he would be an eventual successor for Mike Brumley, but French never came within 86 points of his .297 rookie average. His most productive season came in 1970, when he appeared in a career-high 69 games while hitting .211 with 29 runs and 13 RBI.

In a seven-season career, French was a .196 hitter (119-for-607) with five home runs and 51 RBI in 234 games, including 53 runs, 17 doubles, four triples, three stolen bases, and a .328 on-base percentage. In 220 catching appearances he posted a .982 fielding percentage (22 errors in 1203 chances).

French also played in the Washington, Detroit and Atlanta Minor league systems. French received his Juris Doctor at The John Marshall Law School, and is still a practicing attorney to this day.
