= Dennis Higgins =

American baseball player (1939–2023)

- Pitcher
- Born: August 4, 1939; Jefferson City, Missouri, U.S.
- Died: November 3, 2023 (aged 84); Jefferson City, Missouri, U.S.
- Batted: Right Threw: Right

MLB debut
- April 12, 1966, for the Chicago White Sox

Last MLB appearance
- August 26, 1972, for the St. Louis Cardinals

MLB statistics
- Win–loss record: 22–23
- Earned run average: 3.42
- Strikeouts: 339
- Saves: 46
- Stats at Baseball Reference

Teams
- Chicago White Sox (1966–1967); Washington Senators (1968–1969); Cleveland Indians (1970); St. Louis Cardinals (1971–1972)

Dennis Dean Higgins (August 4, 1939 – November 3, 2023) was an American professional baseball player, a right-handed relief pitcher over all or parts of seven Major League Baseball seasons (1966–1972) with the Chicago White Sox, Washington Senators, Cleveland Indians and St. Louis Cardinals. He was born in Jefferson City, Missouri, where he graduated from high school.

== Personal life ==
Higgins died in Jefferson City on November 3, 2023, at the age of 84.

== Career ==
Listed as 6 feet 3 inches (1.91 m) tall and 180 pounds (82 kg), Higgins signed with the White Sox in 1958 and spent eight full seasons in their farm system before making their major-league roster in 1966. He appeared in 42 games during his rookie campaign, won his lone decision, was credited with five saves, and posted a solid 2.52 earned run average. He also made the first of what would be two career MLB starts on August 31. Facing the Detroit Tigers at Comiskey Park, he held Detroit off the scoresheet for four full innings, then gave up solo home runs to Gates Brown, Don Wert and Dick McAuliffe in the fifth. He left the game in favor of Juan Pizarro with two out, and the White Sox trailing 3–1. But they battled back to win 7–6 in extra innings.

Higgins' sophomore season was not as successful. He appeared in nine games during April and May 1967, posted an ineffective 5.84 ERA, and was demoted to Triple-A Indianapolis, where he worked in only six games. The following February, he was included in a six-player trade to the Washington Senators. He would spend the 1968 and 1969 seasons with Washington, lead the Senators in saves, and enjoy his best years as a major-leaguer. In 1968, he worked in a career-high 59 games and 992/3 innings pitched, all in relief, win four games, save another 13, and register a 3.25 earned run average. He got into 55 games in 1969, and set personal bests with ten victories and 16 saves for first-year manager Ted Williams. But it was his last year in a Senator uniform: on December 5, he was dealt in another multiplayer transaction, this time to the Cleveland Indians.

During 1970, Higgins' one season in Cleveland, he led the Indians in games pitched (58) and saves (11). But his ERA rose to 3.99, and in 1971 he failed to make the club's MLB roster, and was assigned to Triple-A Wichita. Over five days in July, he bounced from the Indians' organization to the Oakland Athletics' system to the St.Louis Cardinals' Triple-A Tulsa affiliate. At the close of the American Association season, the Cardinals recalled him for three September games, then brought him back for 15 appearances bracketing the 1972 season, his final year in Organized Baseball.

For his career, Higgins compiled a 22–23 won–lost record in 241 appearances, with a 3.42 earned run average, 339 strikeouts, and 46 saves. In 4101/3 career innings pitched, he allowed 346 hits and 223 bases on balls.
