= Paul Casanova =

Cuban baseball player (1941–2017)

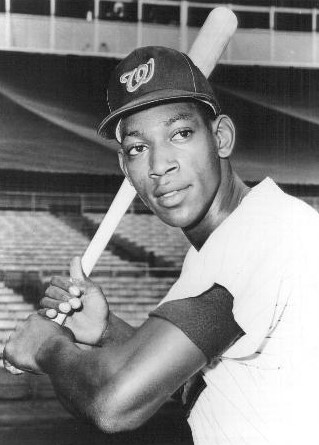
- Catcher
- Born: December 31, 1941; Perico, Cuba
- Died: August 12, 2017 (aged 75); Miami, Florida, U.S.
- Batted: Right Threw: Right

MLB debut
- September 18, 1965, for the Washington Senators

Last MLB appearance
- September 9, 1974, for the Atlanta Braves

MLB statistics
- Batting average: .225
- Home runs: 50
- Runs batted in: 252
- Stats at Baseball Reference

Teams
- Washington Senators (1965–1971); Atlanta Braves (1972–1974)

Career highlights and awards
- All-Star (1967)

Paulino ("Paul") Ortiz Casanova (December 31, 1941 – August 12, 2017) was a Cuban professional baseball player. He played as a catcher in Major League Baseball from 1965 to 1974 for the Washington Senators and Atlanta Braves.

== Early life ==
Casanova was born on December 31, 1941, in Perico, Cuba, and was raised in Colón. (Casanova corrected earlier reports that he was born on December 21 in Colón). His parents were Alejandro Casanova, a sugar cane laborer, and María Herminia Ortiz, a maid. They had seven boys, Casanova being the fourth. The family moved to La Habana (Havana) when Casanova was 13. He played some semi-pro baseball and at the age of 17 joined the Cuban professional league. One of the team's owners, a Cleveland Indians scout, signed Casanova to the organization. After a brief 10-game stint in North Dakota with the Minot Mallards in the Class-C Northern League, Casanova returned to Cuba and Cuban League baseball. On February 9, 1961, the day after the Cuban League season ended, he left Cuba for the United States, via the Mexican embassy.

== Minor league career ==
Casanova began his professional baseball career on January 1, 1960, when he was signed as a free agent by the Cleveland Indians. After playing ten minor league games, he was released by the Indians. Casanova was picked back up by the Indians in December, only to be released again in April 1961. During the 1961 season, he played for the Indianapolis Clowns, a former Negro league team that was now competing as an independent. His third short minor league stint was with the Chicago Cubs, who signed him on September 21, 1961 and released him on April 26, 1962 after he had played two minor league games.

On October 5 of that year, Casanova was signed by the Washington Senators, and his professional baseball career would truly begin the following season. He played 94 games in the minors during the 1963 season. He continued to play in the New York–Penn League during the 1964 season and played 120 games, finishing with 19 home runs and a .325 batting average. He spent the 1965 season playing for the Alamance Indians, and was called up to the major league roster in September, starting his major league career.

== Major league career ==
Casanova began his major league career on September 18, 1965, stepping up to bat twice in a losing effort to the Minnesota Twins – the team which had relocated from Washington less than five years earlier, paving the way for the expansion Senators. He played four more games that season. Casanova's first full season came in 1966, when he had career highs of 13 home runs and 5 triples. The 1967 season was Casanova's best, as he earned his only All-Star bid, though he did not play in the game. He played 141 games, had a fielding percentage of .984, and was tied for 21st in the American League's MVP voting. Casanova never hit as well again as he did in 1967, holding a meager career batting average of .225; but his fielding skills as a catcher were highly valued and kept him in the major leagues. Even umpires appreciated his abilities and acumen as a catcher.

Casanova was also the starting catcher for a 22-inning night game against the Chicago White Sox on June 12, 1967. He caught the whole night, and although he only got one hit in nine at bats, it came in the bottom of the 22nd inning, driving in the winning run. The game, which went 6 hours and 38 minutes, remains the longest night game in MLB history. The following season was a disappointment, as Casanova played in only 96 games and had a batting average of only .196. Casanova played three seasons under the legendary Ted Williams as Senators' manager.

Casanova continued to earn fielding percentages of over .985, but he struggled at the plate for three more seasons. The franchise was moved to the Dallas–Fort Worth metroplex and rebranded as the Texas Rangers, but Casanova would not be part of the transition as he was traded to the Atlanta Braves for Hal King at the Winter Meetings on December 2, 1971. He played for three seasons on the Braves, serving primarily as a backup. He played behind Earl Williams for the 1972 season, then split time with Johnny Oates in 1973. After playing in only 42 games during the 1974 season, Casanova was released on March 28, 1975.

As a Brave, Casanova caught Phil Niekro's no-hitter on August 5, 1973.

== Legacy and death ==
After baseball, Casanova created a baseball academy at his home in Florida. It also became a gathering place for his former teammates and fellow Cuban ball players like Mike Cuellar (a 1969 Cy Young Award winner), Hall of Famer Tony Oliva, Orlando Peña, Cholly Naranjo, Jackie Hernández, José Tartabull, Bert Campaneris (a key player in the Oakland Athletics three World Series wins from 1972-1974), José Cardenal, Minnie Miñoso, as well as Dominican born batting champion Rico Carty and Puerto Rican born Hall of Famer Orlando Cepeda. Casanova has been described as the glue holding his whole generation of baseball players together.

Casanova died in 2017 in Miami, Florida at 75 of cardiorespiratory complications.
