= 1967 Washington Senators season =

1967 Washington Senators
- League: American League
- Ballpark: D.C. Stadium
- City: Washington, D.C.
- Record: 76–85 (.472)
- League place: 6th
- Owners: James M. Johnston and James H. Lemon
- General managers: George Selkirk
- Managers: Gil Hodges
- Television: WTOP
- Radio: WTOP (Dan Daniels, John MacLean)

The 1967 Washington Senators season involved the Senators finishing sixth in the American League with a record of 76 wins and 85 losses.

== Offseason ==
- November 30, 1966: Don Lock was traded by the Senators to the Philadelphia Phillies for Darold Knowles and cash.
- December 3, 1966: Ron Kline was traded by the Senators to the Minnesota Twins for Bernie Allen and Camilo Pascual.
- January 28, 1967: Jan Dukes was drafted by the Senators in the 1st round (8th pick) of the 1967 Major League Baseball draft Secondary Phase.

== Regular season ==
=== Opening Day starters ===
- Bernie Allen
- Ed Brinkman
- Doug Camilli
- Frank Howard
- Ken McMullen
- Dick Nen
- Cap Peterson
- Pete Richert
- Fred Valentine

=== Season standings ===
American League
Team	W	L	Pct.	GB	Home	Road
Boston Red Sox	92	70	.568	—	49‍–‍32	43‍–‍38
Detroit Tigers	91	71	.562	1	52‍–‍29	39‍–‍42
Minnesota Twins	91	71	.562	1	52‍–‍29	39‍–‍42
Chicago White Sox	89	73	.549	3	49‍–‍33	40‍–‍40
California Angels	84	77	.522	7½	53‍–‍30	31‍–‍47
Washington Senators	76	85	.472	15½	40‍–‍40	36‍–‍45
Baltimore Orioles	76	85	.472	15½	35‍–‍42	41‍–‍43
Cleveland Indians	75	87	.463	17	36‍–‍45	39‍–‍42
New York Yankees	72	90	.444	20	43‍–‍38	29‍–‍52
Kansas City Athletics	62	99	.385	29½	37‍–‍44	25‍–‍55

=== Record vs. opponents ===
1967 American League record Sources:
Team	BAL	BOS	CAL	CWS	CLE	DET	KCA	MIN	NYY	WAS
Baltimore	—	10–8	6–11	7–11	9–9	3–15	10–8	8–10	13–5	10–8
Boston	8–10	—	10–8	8–10	13–5	11–7	12–6	7–11	12–6	11–7
California	11–6	8–10	—	7–11	14–4	8–10	14–4	7–11	9–9	6–12
Chicago	11–7	10–8	11–7	—	12–6	8–10	8–10	9–9	12–6	8–10
Cleveland	9–9	5–13	4–14	6–12	—	8–10	11–7	10–8	9–9	13–5
Detroit	15–3	7–11	10–8	10–8	10–8	—	12–6	8–10–1	10–8	9–9
Kansas City	8–10	6–12	4–14	10–8	7–11	6–12	—	8–10	7–11	6–11
Minnesota	10–8	11–7	11–7	9–9	8–10	10–8–1	10–8	—	12–6–1	10–8
New York	5–13	6–12	9–9	6–12	9–9	8–10	11–7	6–12–1	—	12–6
Washington	8–10	7–11	12–6	10–8	5–13	9–9	11–6	8–10	6–12	—

=== Notable transactions ===
- May 29, 1967: Pete Richert was traded by the Senators to the Baltimore Orioles for Mike Epstein and Frank Bertaina.
- June 6, 1967: 1967 Major League Baseball draft
  - Bobby Jones was drafted by the Senators in the 36th round.
  - Paul Reuschel was drafted by the Senators in the 3rd round of the secondary phase, but did not sign.
- June 15, 1967: Jim King was traded by the Senators to the Chicago White Sox for Ed Stroud. King was the last of the original 1961 Washington Senator players.

== Roster ==
1967 Washington Senators
Roster
Pitchers: 31,37 Dave Baldwin; 24 Frank Bertaina; 27 Dick Bosman; 20,37 Joe Coleman; 29 Casey Cox; 19 Jim Hannan; 23 Bob Humphreys; 22,32 Darold Knowles; 18 Dick Lines; 25 Barry Moore; 20 Buster Narum; 22 Dick Nold; 26 Phil Ortega; 17 Camilo Pascual; 16 Bob Priddy; 24 Pete Richert	Catchers: 21 Doug Camilli; 8 Paul Casanova; 10 Jim French; Infielders: 7 Bernie Allen; 11 Ed Brinkman; 31 Bob Chance; 30 Frank Coggins; 1 Tim Cullen; 12 Mike Epstein; 3 Ken Harrelson; 2 Ken McMullen; 5 Dick Nen; 15 Bob Saverine	Outfielders: 6 Hank Allen; 9 Frank Howard; 30 Jim King; 4 Cap Peterson; 36 Ed Stroud; 34 Fred Valentine; Other batters: 3 John Orsino	Manager: 14 Gil Hodges; Coaches: 44 Joe Pignatano; 43 George Susce; 41 Rube Walker; 42 Eddie Yost

== Player stats ==
= Indicates team leader

=== Batting ===
==== Starters by position ====
Note: Pos = Position; G = Games played; AB = At bats; H = Hits; Avg. = Batting average; HR = Home runs; RBI = Runs batted in

Pos	Player	G	AB	H	Avg.	HR	RBI
C	Paul Casanova	141	528	131	.248	9	53
1B	Mike Epstein	96	284	65	.229	9	29
2B	Bernie Allen	87	254	49	.193	3	18
SS	Ed Brinkman	109	320	60	.188	1	18
3B	Ken McMullen	146	563	138	.245	16	67
LF	Frank Howard	149	519	133	.256	36	89
CF	Fred Valentine	151	457	107	.234	11	44
RF	Cap Peterson	122	405	97	.240	8	46

==== Other batters ====
Note: G = Games played; AB = At bats; H = Hits; Avg. = Batting average; HR = Home runs; RBI = Runs batted in

Player	G	AB	H	Avg.	HR	RBI
Tim Cullen	124	402	95	.236	2	31
Hank Allen	116	292	68	.233	3	17
Dick Nen	110	238	52	.218	6	29
Bob Saverine	89	233	55	.236	0	8
Ed Stroud	87	204	41	.201	1	10
Jim King	47	100	21	.210	1	12
Doug Camilli	30	82	15	.183	2	5
Ken Harrelson	26	79	16	.203	3	10
Frank Coggins	19	75	23	.307	1	8
Bob Chance	27	42	9	.214	3	7
Jim French	6	16	1	.063	0	1
John Orsino	1	1	0	.000	0	0

=== Pitching ===
==== Starting pitchers ====
Note: G = Games pitched; IP = Innings pitched; W = Wins; L = Losses; ERA = Earned run average; SO = Strikeouts

Player	G	IP	W	L	ERA	SO
Phil Ortega	34	219.2	10	10	3.03	122
Camilo Pascual	28	164.2	12	10	3.28	106
Barry Moore	27	143.2	7	11	3.76	74
Joe Coleman	28	134.0	8	9	4.63	77
Frank Bertaina	18	95.2	6	5	2.92	67
Pete Richert	11	54.1	2	6	4.64	41
Dick Bosman	7	51.1	3	1	1.75	25
Buster Narum	2	11.2	1	0	3.09	8

==== Other pitchers ====
Note: G = Games pitched; IP = Innings pitched; W = Wins; L = Losses; ERA = Earned run average; SO = Strikeouts

Player	G	IP	W	L	ERA	SO
Bob Priddy	46	110.0	3	7	3.44	57
Jim Hannan	8	21.2	1	1	5.40	14
Dick Nold	7	20.1	0	2	4.87	10

==== Relief pitchers ====
Note: G = Games pitched; W = Wins; L = Losses; SV = Saves; ERA = Earned run average; SO = Strikeouts

Player	G	W	L	SV	ERA	SO
Darold Knowles	61	6	8	14	2.70	85
Dave Baldwin	58	2	4	12	1.70	52
Dick Lines	54	2	5	4	3.36	54
Casey Cox	54	7	4	1	2.96	32
Bob Humphreys	48	6	2	4	4.17	54

== Farm system ==
Level	Team	League	Manager
AAA	Hawaii Islanders	Pacific Coast League	Wayne Terwilliger
AA	York White Roses	Eastern League	Billy Klaus and George Case
A	Burlington Senators	Carolina League	Len Johnston
A-Short Season	Geneva Senators	New York–Penn League	Gordon Mackenzie
