= 1967 Baltimore Orioles season =

Major League Baseball season

1967 Baltimore Orioles
- League: American League
- Ballpark: Memorial Stadium
- City: Baltimore, Maryland
- Record: 76–85 (.472)
- League place: 6th
- Owners: Jerold Hoffberger
- General managers: Harry Dalton
- Managers: Hank Bauer
- Television: WJZ-TV
- Radio: WBAL (AM) (Chuck Thompson, Frank Messer, Bill O'Donnell)

The 1967 Baltimore Orioles season was the 67th season in Baltimore Orioles franchise history, the 14th in Baltimore, and the 14th at Memorial Stadium. The Orioles finished the season in sixth place in the American League with a record of 76 wins and 85 losses, 15 1/2 games behind the AL champion Boston Red Sox. The team was managed by Hank Bauer (in his final full season as manager), and played their home games at Memorial Stadium.

== Offseason ==
- November 28, 1966: Frank Tepedino was drafted from the Orioles by the New York Yankees in the 1966 first-year draft.
- January 28, 1967: 1967 Major League Baseball draft
  - Lew Beasley was drafted by the Orioles in the 2nd round.
  - Johnny Oates was drafted by the Orioles in the 1st round (10th pick) of the Secondary Phase.

== Regular season ==
- On April 30, 1967, Steve Barber threw a no-hitter versus the Detroit Tigers but lost in a 2–1 final. Barber would become the first pitcher in the history of the American League whose no-hit game ended in a loss.
- May 14, 1967: In a game against the Orioles at Yankee Stadium, future Hall of Famer Mickey Mantle of the New York Yankees hit his 500th home run in the bottom of the seventh inning in a 6–5 Yankee win.

=== Season standings ===
American League
Team	W	L	Pct.	GB	Home	Road
Boston Red Sox	92	70	.568	—	49‍–‍32	43‍–‍38
Detroit Tigers	91	71	.562	1	52‍–‍29	39‍–‍42
Minnesota Twins	91	71	.562	1	52‍–‍29	39‍–‍42
Chicago White Sox	89	73	.549	3	49‍–‍33	40‍–‍40
California Angels	84	77	.522	7½	53‍–‍30	31‍–‍47
Washington Senators	76	85	.472	15½	40‍–‍40	36‍–‍45
Baltimore Orioles	76	85	.472	15½	35‍–‍42	41‍–‍43
Cleveland Indians	75	87	.463	17	36‍–‍45	39‍–‍42
New York Yankees	72	90	.444	20	43‍–‍38	29‍–‍52
Kansas City Athletics	62	99	.385	29½	37‍–‍44	25‍–‍55

=== Record vs. opponents ===
1967 American League record Sources:
Team	BAL	BOS	CAL	CWS	CLE	DET	KCA	MIN	NYY	WAS
Baltimore	—	10–8	6–11	7–11	9–9	3–15	10–8	8–10	13–5	10–8
Boston	8–10	—	10–8	8–10	13–5	11–7	12–6	7–11	12–6	11–7
California	11–6	8–10	—	7–11	14–4	8–10	14–4	7–11	9–9	6–12
Chicago	11–7	10–8	11–7	—	12–6	8–10	8–10	9–9	12–6	8–10
Cleveland	9–9	5–13	4–14	6–12	—	8–10	11–7	10–8	9–9	13–5
Detroit	15–3	7–11	10–8	10–8	10–8	—	12–6	8–10–1	10–8	9–9
Kansas City	8–10	6–12	4–14	10–8	7–11	6–12	—	8–10	7–11	6–11
Minnesota	10–8	11–7	11–7	9–9	8–10	10–8–1	10–8	—	12–6–1	10–8
New York	5–13	6–12	9–9	6–12	9–9	8–10	11–7	6–12–1	—	12–6
Washington	8–10	7–11	12–6	10–8	5–13	9–9	11–6	8–10	6–12	—

=== Notable transactions ===
- May 10, 1967: Bob Johnson was purchased from the Orioles by the New York Mets.
- May 29, 1967: Mike Epstein and Frank Bertaina were traded by the Orioles to the Washington Senators for Pete Richert.
- May 31, 1967: Charley Lau was purchased from the Orioles by the Atlanta Braves.
- June 6, 1967: 1967 Major League Baseball draft
  - Don Baylor was drafted by the Orioles in the 2nd round.
  - Dave Johnson was drafted by the Orioles in the 5th round.
- June 15, 1967: Woodie Held was traded by the Orioles to the California Angels for Marcelino López and Tom Arruda (minors).
- July 4, 1967: Steve Barber was traded by the Orioles to the New York Yankees for Ray Barker, players to be named later, and cash. The Yankees completed the deal by sending Chet Trail (minors) and Joe Brady (minors) to the Orioles on December 15.
- August 21, 1967: John Buzhardt was purchased by the Orioles from the Chicago White Sox.

=== Roster ===
1967 Baltimore Orioles
Roster
Pitchers: 17 Mike Adamson; 13 Steve Barber; 40 Frank Bertaina; 32 Gene Brabender; 27 Wally Bunker; 30 John Buzhardt; 45 Bill Dillman; 25 Moe Drabowsky; 28 Eddie Fisher; 29,46 Tom Fisher; 33 Paul Gilliford; 44 Jim Hardin; 24,40 Dave Leonhard; 29 Marcelino López; 19 Dave McNally; 17 John Miller; 37 Stu Miller; 22 Jim Palmer; 36 Tom Phoebus; 24 Pete Richert; 39 Eddie Watt	Catchers: 8 Andy Etchebarren; 34 Larry Haney; 23 Vic Roznovsky; Infielders: 11 Luis Aparicio; 7 Mark Belanger; 4 Mike Epstein; 12 Woodie Held; 15 Davey Johnson; 2 Mickey McGuire; 26 Boog Powell; 5 Brooks Robinson	Outfielders: 6 Paul Blair; 3 Curt Blefary; 16 Sam Bowens; 12 Dave May; 21 Curt Motton; 20 Frank Robinson; 9 Russ Snyder; Other batters: 2 Bob Johnson; 44 Charley Lau	Manager: 42 Hank Bauer; Coaches: 31 Harry Brecheen; 55 Billy Hunter; 41 Sherm Lollar; 14 Gene Woodling

== Player stats ==
=== Batting ===
==== Starters by position ====
Note: Pos = Position; G = Games played; AB = At bats; H = Hits; Avg. = Batting average; HR = Home runs; RBI = Runs batted in

Pos	Player	G	AB	H	Avg.	HR	RBI
C	Andy Etchebarren	112	330	71	.215	7	35
1B	Boog Powell	125	415	97	.234	13	55
2B	Davey Johnson	148	510	126	.247	10	64
3B	Brooks Robinson	158	610	164	.269	22	77
SS	Luis Aparicio	134	546	127	.233	4	31
LF	Curt Blefary	155	554	134	.242	22	81
CF	Paul Blair	151	552	162	.293	11	64
RF	Frank Robinson	129	479	149	.311	30	94

==== Other batters ====
Note: G = Games played; AB = At bats; H = Hits; Avg. = Batting average; HR = Home runs; RBI = Runs batted in

Player	G	AB	H	Avg.	HR	RBI
Russ Snyder	108	275	65	.236	4	23
Mark Belanger	69	184	32	.174	1	10
Larry Haney	58	164	44	.268	3	20
Sam Bowens	62	120	22	.183	5	12
Vic Roznovsky	45	97	20	.206	0	10
Dave May	36	85	20	.235	1	7
Curt Motton	27	65	13	.200	2	9
Woodie Held	26	41	6	.146	1	6
Mickey McGuire	10	17	4	.235	0	2
Mike Epstein	9	13	2	.154	0	0
Charley Lau	11	8	1	.125	0	3
Bob Johnson	4	3	1	.333	0	0

=== Pitching ===
==== Starting pitchers ====
Note: G = Games pitched; IP = Innings pitched; W = Wins; L = Losses; ERA = Earned run average; SO = Strikeouts

Player	G	IP	W	L	ERA	SO
Tom Phoebus	33	208.0	14	9	3.33	179
Pete Richert	26	132.1	7	10	2.99	90
Dave McNally	24	119.0	7	7	4.54	70
Jim Hardin	19	111.0	8	3	2.27	64
Gene Brabender	14	94.0	6	4	3.35	71
Steve Barber	15	74.2	4	9	2.99	90
Jim Palmer	9	49.0	3	1	2.94	23
Marcelino López	4	17.2	1	0	2.55	15

==== Other pitchers ====
Note: G = Games pitched; IP = Innings pitched; W = Wins; L = Losses; ERA = Earned run average; SO = Strikeouts

Player	G	IP	W	L	ERA	SO
Bill Dillman	32	124.0	5	9	4.35	69
Frank Bertaina	5	21.2	1	1	3.32	19
Dave Leonhard	3	14.1	0	0	3.14	9
Mike Adamson	3	9.2	0	1	8.38	8

==== Relief pitchers ====
Note: G = Games pitched; W = Wins; L = Losses; SV = Saves; ERA = Earned run average; SO = Strikeouts

Player	G	W	L	SV	ERA	SO
Moe Drabowsky	43	7	5	12	1.60	96
Eddie Watt	49	3	5	8	2.26	93
Eddie Fisher	46	4	3	1	3.61	53
Stu Miller	42	3	10	8	2.55	60
Wally Bunker	29	3	7	1	4.09	51
John Buzhardt	7	0	1	0	4.63	7
Tom Fisher	2	0	0	0	0.00	1
Paul Gilliford	2	0	0	0	12.00	2
John Miller	2	0	0	0	7.50	6

== Farm system ==
Level	Team	League	Manager
AAA	Rochester Red Wings	International League	Earl Weaver
AA	Elmira Pioneers	Eastern League	Billy DeMars
A	Stockton Ports	California League	Harry Malmberg
A	Miami Marlins	Florida State League	Cal Ripken Sr.
A-Short Season	Aberdeen Pheasants	Northern League	Owen Friend
Rookie	Bluefield Orioles	Appalachian League	Joe Altobelli

LEAGUE CHAMPIONS: Bluefield
