= 1967 New York Yankees season =

Season for the Major League Baseball team the New York Yankees

1967 New York Yankees
- League: American League
- Ballpark: Yankee Stadium
- City: New York City
- Record: 72–90 (.444)
- League place: 9th
- Owners: CBS
- General managers: Lee MacPhail
- Managers: Ralph Houk
- Television: WPIX (Phil Rizzuto, Jerry Coleman, Joe Garagiola)
- Radio: WHN (Phil Rizzuto, Jerry Coleman, Joe Garagiola)

The 1967 New York Yankees season was the 65th season for the Yankees. The team finished ahead of only the Kansas City Athletics (who moved to Oakland after the season ended) in the American League final standings, with a record of 72–90, finishing 20 games behind the Boston Red Sox. It was their most losses in a season since losing 94 games in 1913, which was the first season in which the team went by the word Yankees. New York was managed by Ralph Houk. The Yankees played at Yankee Stadium.

== Offseason ==
- November 28, 1966: Frank Tepedino was drafted by the Yankees from the Baltimore Orioles in the 1966 first-year draft.
- November 29, 1966: Clete Boyer was traded by the Yankees to the Atlanta Braves for Bill Robinson and Chi-Chi Olivo.
- December 8, 1966: Roger Maris was traded by the Yankees to the St. Louis Cardinals for Charley Smith.
- December 10, 1966: Pedro Ramos was traded by the Yankees to the Philadelphia Phillies for Joe Verbanic and cash.

== Regular season ==
- May 14, 1967: At Yankee Stadium, Mickey Mantle hit his 500th home run in the bottom of the seventh inning off of Stu Miller in a 6–5 Yankee win over the Baltimore Orioles.

=== Season standings ===
American League
Team	W	L	Pct.	GB	Home	Road
Boston Red Sox	92	70	.568	—	49‍–‍32	43‍–‍38
Detroit Tigers	91	71	.562	1	52‍–‍29	39‍–‍42
Minnesota Twins	91	71	.562	1	52‍–‍29	39‍–‍42
Chicago White Sox	89	73	.549	3	49‍–‍33	40‍–‍40
California Angels	84	77	.522	7½	53‍–‍30	31‍–‍47
Washington Senators	76	85	.472	15½	40‍–‍40	36‍–‍45
Baltimore Orioles	76	85	.472	15½	35‍–‍42	41‍–‍43
Cleveland Indians	75	87	.463	17	36‍–‍45	39‍–‍42
New York Yankees	72	90	.444	20	43‍–‍38	29‍–‍52
Kansas City Athletics	62	99	.385	29½	37‍–‍44	25‍–‍55

=== Record vs. opponents ===
1967 American League record Sources:
Team	BAL	BOS	CAL	CWS	CLE	DET	KCA	MIN	NYY	WAS
Baltimore	—	10–8	6–11	7–11	9–9	3–15	10–8	8–10	13–5	10–8
Boston	8–10	—	10–8	8–10	13–5	11–7	12–6	7–11	12–6	11–7
California	11–6	8–10	—	7–11	14–4	8–10	14–4	7–11	9–9	6–12
Chicago	11–7	10–8	11–7	—	12–6	8–10	8–10	9–9	12–6	8–10
Cleveland	9–9	5–13	4–14	6–12	—	8–10	11–7	10–8	9–9	13–5
Detroit	15–3	7–11	10–8	10–8	10–8	—	12–6	8–10–1	10–8	9–9
Kansas City	8–10	6–12	4–14	10–8	7–11	6–12	—	8–10	7–11	6–11
Minnesota	10–8	11–7	11–7	9–9	8–10	10–8–1	10–8	—	12–6–1	10–8
New York	5–13	6–12	9–9	6–12	9–9	8–10	11–7	6–12–1	—	12–6
Washington	8–10	7–11	12–6	10–8	5–13	9–9	11–6	8–10	6–12	—

=== Notable transactions ===
- June 6, 1967: Steve Rogers was drafted by the Yankees in the 60th round of the 1967 Major League Baseball draft, but did not sign.
- July 4, 1967: Ray Barker, players to be named later, and cash were traded by the Yankees to the Baltimore Orioles for Steve Barber. The Yankees completed the deal by sending Chet Trail (minors) and Joe Brady (minors) to the Orioles on December 15, 1967.
- August 3, 1967: Elston Howard was traded by the Yankees to the Boston Red Sox for Pete Magrini and a player to be named later. The Red Sox completed the deal by sending Ron Klimkowski to the Yankees on August 8.

=== Roster ===
1967 New York Yankees
Roster
Pitchers: 18 Steve Barber; 56 Jim Bouton; 24 Al Downing; 16 Whitey Ford; 39 Steve Hamilton; 40 Bill Monbouquette; 48 Cecil Perkins; 19 Fritz Peterson; 18 Hal Reniff; 43 Dale Roberts; 30 Mel Stottlemyre; 22 Fred Talbot; 54 Thad Tillotson; 52 Joe Verbanic; 58 Dooley Womack	Catchers: 60 Billy Bryan; 38 Frank Fernández; 41 Jake Gibbs; 32 Elston Howard; 23 Bob Tillman; Infielders: 12 Rubén Amaro; 42 Ray Barker; 20 Horace Clarke; 34 Mike Hegan; 10 Dick Howser; 26 John Kennedy; 14 Jerry Kenney; 7 Mickey Mantle; 6 Charley Smith; 47 Frank Tepedino	Outfielders: 40 Lou Clinton; 53 Ross Moschitto; 25 Joe Pepitone; 11 Bill Robinson; 17,27 Tom Shopay; 15 Tom Tresh; 28 Steve Whitaker; 48 Roy White; Other batters: 49 Charlie Sands	Manager: 35 Ralph Houk; Coaches: 36 Loren Babe; 2 Frankie Crosetti; 44 Jim Hegan; 31 Jim Turner

== Player stats ==
=== Batting ===
==== Starters by position ====
Note: Pos = Position; G = Games played; AB = At bats; H = Hits; Avg. = Batting average; HR = Home runs; RBI = Runs batted in

Pos	Player	G	AB	H	Avg.	HR	RBI
C	Jake Gibbs	116	374	87	.233	4	25
1B	Mickey Mantle	144	440	108	.245	22	55
2B	Horace Clarke	143	588	160	.272	3	29
SS	Rubén Amaro Sr.	130	417	93	.223	1	17
3B	Charley Smith	135	425	95	.224	9	38
OF	Tom Tresh	130	448	98	.219	14	53
OF	Joe Pepitone	133	501	126	.251	13	64
OF	Steve Whitaker	122	441	107	.243	11	50

==== Other batters ====
Note: G = Games played; AB = At bats; H = Hits; Avg. = Batting average; HR = Home runs; RBI = Runs batted in

Player	G	AB	H	Avg.	HR	RBI
Bill Robinson	116	342	67	.196	7	29
Roy White	70	214	48	.224	2	18
Elston Howard	66	199	39	.196	3	17
John Kennedy	78	179	35	.196	1	17
Dick Howser	63	149	40	.268	0	10
Mike Hegan	68	118	16	.136	1	3
Bob Tillman	22	63	16	.254	2	9
Jerry Kenney	20	58	18	.310	1	5
Frank Fernández	9	28	6	.214	1	4
Tom Shopay	8	27	8	.296	2	6
Ray Barker	17	26	2	.077	0	0
Billy Bryan	16	12	2	.167	1	2
Ross Moschitto	14	9	1	.111	0	0
Frank Tepedino	9	5	2	.400	0	0
Lou Clinton	6	4	2	.500	0	2
Charlie Sands	1	1	0	.000	0	0

=== Pitching ===
==== Starting pitchers ====
Note: G = Games pitched; IP = Innings pitched; W = Wins; L = Losses; ERA = Earned run average; SO = Strikeouts

Player	G	IP	W	L	ERA	SO
Mel Stottlemyre	36	255.0	15	15	2.96	151
Al Downing	31	201.2	14	10	2.63	171
Fritz Peterson	36	181.1	8	14	3.47	102
Fred Talbot	29	138.2	6	8	4.22	61
Steve Barber	17	97.2	6	9	4.05	70
Whitey Ford	7	44.0	2	4	1.64	21

==== Other pitchers ====
Note: G = Games pitched; IP = Innings pitched; W = Wins; L = Losses; ERA = Earned run average; SO = Strikeouts

Player	G	IP	W	L	ERA	SO
Bill Monbouquette	33	133.1	6	5	2.36	53
Thad Tillotson	43	98.1	3	9	4.03	62
Joe Verbanic	28	80.1	4	3	2.80	39
Cecil Perkins	2	5.0	0	1	9.00	1

==== Relief pitchers ====
Note: G = Games pitched; W = Wins; L = Losses; SV = Saves; ERA = Earned run average; SO = Strikeouts

Player	G	W	L	SV	ERA	SO
Dooley Womack	65	5	6	18	2.41	57
Steve Hamilton	44	2	4	4	3.48	55
Hal Reniff	24	0	2	0	4.28	24
Jim Bouton	17	1	0	0	4.67	31
Dale Roberts	2	0	0	0	9.00	0

== Farm system ==
Level	Team	League	Manager
AAA	Syracuse Chiefs	International League	Gary Blaylock
AA	Binghamton Triplets	Eastern League	Jack Reed
A	Greensboro Yankees	Carolina League	Bob Bauer
A	Fort Lauderdale Yankees	Florida State League	Billy Shantz
A-Short Season	Oneonta Yankees	New York–Penn League	Frank Verdi
Rookie	Johnson City Yankees	Appalachian League	Dick Berardino

LEAGUE CHAMPIONS: Binghamton
