= 1967 Kansas City Athletics season =

1967 Kansas City Athletics
- League: American League
- Ballpark: Municipal Stadium
- City: Kansas City, Missouri
- Record: 62–99 (.385)
- League place: 10th
- Owners: Charles O. Finley
- General managers: Ed Lopat
- Managers: Alvin Dark, Luke Appling
- Television: KCMO-TV
- Radio: KCMO (AM) (Monte Moore, Lynn Faris)

The 1967 Kansas City Athletics season was the 67th season for the Athletics franchise, all as members of the American League, and their the 13th and final season in Kansas City, as the team relocated from Kansas City to Oakland the following season. The Athletics finished tenth in the American League with a record of 62 wins and 99 losses, 29 1/2 games behind the American League Champion Boston Red Sox. This precipitated a series of events culminating in the enfranchisement of the Kansas City Royals in the 1969 Major League Baseball expansion.

The paid attendance for the season was 726,639 fans.

== Offseason ==
- November 29, 1966: Manny Jiménez was drafted from the Athletics by the Pittsburgh Pirates in the 1966 minor league draft.
- January 28, 1967: 1967 Major League Baseball draft (January Draft) notable picks:

Round 1: Ken Hottman (did not sign)

Secondary Phase

Round 5: Jim Panther .

- In the offseason, local millionaire Ewing Kauffman was approached by a group led by sportswriter Ernie Mehl to buy the club and ensure that it remained in Kansas City.

== Regular season ==
- Despite an 18–18 start, the Athletics had a record of 35 wins compared to 49 losses by the All-Star Break.
- On June 9, Reggie Jackson debuted in the major leagues with the A's at home in a doubleheader shutout sweep of the Cleveland Indians. He started in right field and went hitless in three at-bats in the opener, then entered the nightcap in the fifth inning and promptly hit a lead-off triple off of long reliever Orlando Peña, but did not score.

=== Season standings ===
American League
| Team | W | L | Pct. | GB | Home | Road |
|---|---|---|---|---|---|---|
| Boston Red Sox | 92 | 70 | .568 | — | 49‍–‍32 | 43‍–‍38 |
| Detroit Tigers | 91 | 71 | .562 | 1 | 52‍–‍29 | 39‍–‍42 |
| Minnesota Twins | 91 | 71 | .562 | 1 | 52‍–‍29 | 39‍–‍42 |
| Chicago White Sox | 89 | 73 | .549 | 3 | 49‍–‍33 | 40‍–‍40 |
| California Angels | 84 | 77 | .522 | 7½ | 53‍–‍30 | 31‍–‍47 |
| Washington Senators | 76 | 85 | .472 | 15½ | 40‍–‍40 | 36‍–‍45 |
| Baltimore Orioles | 76 | 85 | .472 | 15½ | 35‍–‍42 | 41‍–‍43 |
| Cleveland Indians | 75 | 87 | .463 | 17 | 36‍–‍45 | 39‍–‍42 |
| New York Yankees | 72 | 90 | .444 | 20 | 43‍–‍38 | 29‍–‍52 |
| Kansas City Athletics | 62 | 99 | .385 | 29½ | 37‍–‍44 | 25‍–‍55 |

=== Record vs. opponents ===
1967 American League record Sources:
| Team | BAL | BOS | CAL | CWS | CLE | DET | KCA | MIN | NYY | WAS |
|---|---|---|---|---|---|---|---|---|---|---|
| Baltimore | — | 10–8 | 6–11 | 7–11 | 9–9 | 3–15 | 10–8 | 8–10 | 13–5 | 10–8 |
| Boston | 8–10 | — | 10–8 | 8–10 | 13–5 | 11–7 | 12–6 | 7–11 | 12–6 | 11–7 |
| California | 11–6 | 8–10 | — | 7–11 | 14–4 | 8–10 | 14–4 | 7–11 | 9–9 | 6–12 |
| Chicago | 11–7 | 10–8 | 11–7 | — | 12–6 | 8–10 | 8–10 | 9–9 | 12–6 | 8–10 |
| Cleveland | 9–9 | 5–13 | 4–14 | 6–12 | — | 8–10 | 11–7 | 10–8 | 9–9 | 13–5 |
| Detroit | 15–3 | 7–11 | 10–8 | 10–8 | 10–8 | — | 12–6 | 8–10–1 | 10–8 | 9–9 |
| Kansas City | 8–10 | 6–12 | 4–14 | 10–8 | 7–11 | 6–12 | — | 8–10 | 7–11 | 6–11 |
| Minnesota | 10–8 | 11–7 | 11–7 | 9–9 | 8–10 | 10–8–1 | 10–8 | — | 12–6–1 | 10–8 |
| New York | 5–13 | 6–12 | 9–9 | 6–12 | 9–9 | 8–10 | 11–7 | 6–12–1 | — | 12–6 |
| Washington | 8–10 | 7–11 | 12–6 | 10–8 | 5–13 | 9–9 | 11–6 | 8–10 | 6–12 | — |

=== Notable transactions ===
- June 6, 1967: 1967 Major League Baseball draft (June Draft) notable picks:

Round 2: Vida Blue
Round 11: Eric Soderholm (did not sign)

Secondary Phase:

Round 4: Warren Bogle
Round 5: Ray Peters (did not sign)
Round 7: Darrell Evans

=== Roster ===
1967 Kansas City Athletics
Roster
| Pitchers: 23 Jack Aker; 29 Chuck Dobson; 31 Bob Duliba; 22 Bill Edgerton; 27 Catfish Hunter; 20 Lew Krausse Jr.; 28 George Lauzerique; 25 Paul Lindblad; 30 Jim Nash; 13 Blue Moon Odom; 32 Tony Pierce; 16,17 Roberto Rodríguez; 33 Jack Sanford; 26 Diego Seguí; 22 Bill Stafford; 18 Wes Stock | Catchers: 6 Dave Duncan; 4 Phil Roof; 17 Ken Suarez; 11 Tim Talton; Infielders: 6 Sal Bando; 10 Weldon Bowlin; 19 Bert Campaneris; 2 Danny Cater; 16 Ed Charles; 10,12 Ossie Chavarria; 12 John Donaldson; 1 Dick Green; 6,8 Ken Harrelson; 14 Ted Kubiak; 15 Joe Rudi; 34 Ray Webster | Outfielders: 21 Jim Gosger; 3 Mike Hershberger; 31 Reggie Jackson; 7 Rick Monday; 24 Joe Nossek; 9 Roger Repoz; Other batters: 10 Allan Lewis | Manager: 33 Luke Appling; 5 Alvin Dark; Coaches: 42 Cot Deal (Pitching); 40 Bobby Hofman; 18 Wes Stock; 41 Al Vincent |

== Player stats ==
=== Batting ===
==== Starters by position ====
Note: Pos = Position; G = Games played; AB = At bats; H = Hits; Avg. = Batting average; HR = Home runs; RBI = Runs batted in

| Pos | Player | G | AB | H | Avg. | HR | RBI |
|---|---|---|---|---|---|---|---|
| C | Phil Roof | 114 | 327 | 67 | .205 | 6 | 24 |
| 1B | Ray Webster | 122 | 360 | 92 | .258 | 11 | 51 |
| 2B | John Donaldson | 105 | 377 | 104 | .276 | 0 | 28 |
| SS | Bert Campaneris | 147 | 601 | 149 | .248 | 3 | 32 |
| 3B | Danny Cater | 142 | 529 | 143 | .270 | 4 | 46 |
| LF | Jim Gosger | 134 | 356 | 86 | .242 | 5 | 36 |
| CF | Rick Monday | 124 | 406 | 102 | .251 | 14 | 58 |
| RF | Mike Hershberger | 142 | 480 | 122 | .254 | 1 | 49 |

==== Other batters ====
Note: G = Games played; AB = At bats; H = Hits; Avg. = Batting average; HR = Home runs; RBI = Runs batted in

| Player | G | AB | H | Avg. | HR | RBI |
|---|---|---|---|---|---|---|
| Dick Green | 122 | 349 | 69 | .198 | 5 | 37 |
| Ken Harrelson | 61 | 174 | 53 | .305 | 6 | 30 |
| Joe Nossek | 87 | 166 | 34 | .205 | 0 | 10 |
| Sal Bando | 47 | 130 | 25 | .192 | 0 | 6 |
| Reggie Jackson | 35 | 118 | 21 | .178 | 1 | 6 |
| Ted Kubiak | 53 | 102 | 16 | .157 | 0 | 5 |
| Dave Duncan | 34 | 101 | 19 | .188 | 5 | 11 |
| Roger Repoz | 40 | 87 | 21 | .241 | 2 | 8 |
| Ken Suarez | 39 | 63 | 15 | .238 | 2 | 9 |
| Ed Charles | 19 | 61 | 15 | .246 | 0 | 5 |
| Tim Talton | 46 | 59 | 15 | .254 | 0 | 5 |
| Ossie Chavarría | 38 | 59 | 6 | .102 | 0 | 4 |
| Joe Rudi | 19 | 43 | 8 | .186 | 0 | 1 |
| Allan Lewis | 34 | 6 | 1 | .167 | 0 | 0 |
| Weldon Bowlin | 2 | 5 | 1 | .200 | 0 | 0 |

=== Pitching ===
==== Starting pitchers ====
Note: G = Games pitched; IP = Innings pitched; W = Wins; L = Losses; ERA = Earned run average; SO = Strikeouts

| Player | G | IP | W | L | ERA | SO |
|---|---|---|---|---|---|---|
| Catfish Hunter | 35 | 259.2 | 13 | 17 | 2.81 | 196 |
| Jim Nash | 37 | 222.1 | 12 | 17 | 3.76 | 186 |
| Chuck Dobson | 32 | 197.2 | 10 | 10 | 3.69 | 110 |

==== Other pitchers ====
Note: G = Games pitched; IP = Innings pitched; W = Wins; L = Losses; ERA = Earned run average; SO = Strikeouts

| Player | G | IP | W | L | ERA | SO |
|---|---|---|---|---|---|---|
| Lew Krausse Jr. | 48 | 160.0 | 7 | 17 | 4.28 | 96 |
| Paul Lindblad | 46 | 115.2 | 5 | 8 | 3.58 | 83 |
| Blue Moon Odom | 29 | 103.2 | 3 | 8 | 5.04 | 67 |
| Roberto Rodríguez | 15 | 40.1 | 1 | 1 | 3.57 | 29 |
| George Lauzerique | 3 | 16.0 | 0 | 2 | 2.25 | 10 |

==== Relief pitchers ====
Note: G = Games pitched; W = Wins; L = Losses; SV = Saves; ERA = Earned run average; SO = Strikeouts

| Player | G | W | L | SV | ERA | SO |
|---|---|---|---|---|---|---|
| Jack Aker | 57 | 3 | 8 | 12 | 4.30 | 65 |
| Tony Pierce | 49 | 3 | 4 | 7 | 3.04 | 61 |
| Diego Seguí | 36 | 3 | 4 | 1 | 3.09 | 52 |
| Bill Stafford | 14 | 0 | 1 | 0 | 1.69 | 10 |
| Jack Sanford | 10 | 1 | 2 | 0 | 6.55 | 13 |
| Bob Duliba | 7 | 0 | 0 | 0 | 6.52 | 6 |
| Bill Edgerton | 7 | 1 | 0 | 0 | 2.16 | 6 |
| Wes Stock | 1 | 0 | 0 | 0 | 18.00 | 0 |

== Farm system ==
| Level | Team | League | Manager |
|---|---|---|---|
| AAA | Vancouver Mounties | Pacific Coast League | Mickey Vernon |
| AA | Birmingham A's | Southern League | John McNamara |
| A | Peninsula Grays | Carolina League | Gus Niarhos |
| A | Leesburg Athletics | Florida State League | Jimmy Williams |
| A | Burlington Bees | Midwest League | Al Ronning |
| Rookie | GCL A's | Gulf Coast League | Connie Ryan |

LEAGUE CHAMPIONS: Birmingham, GCL A's

== Awards and honors ==
- Bert Campaneris led the American League in stolen bases for the third consecutive season.

== Relocation ==
- May 7, 1967: The New York Times and New York Daily News reported that the Athletics were prepared to relocate to Oakland, California.
- July 1967: The Sporting News reported that the Athletics had reached an agreement to relocate to Milwaukee, Wisconsin. The Athletics had obtained pledges for television and radio broadcasting rights with the sponsorship of Schlitz Brewery. The proposed move would require the support of seven of the ten American League owners. The league only had five votes in favour of the proposed relocation.
- August 1, 1967: The Governor of Washington State Dan Evans, and mayor of Seattle, J.D. Braman spoke to Finley on the phone to discuss the relocation of the team to Seattle. Finley had met with city officials on August 7 to discuss a possible relocation.
- In September 1967, Finley had sent a telegram to city manager Carleton Sharpe, advising that the Athletics would leave Kansas City for Oakland.
- October 18, 1967: City officials from Kansas City, Oakland and Seattle were invited by Joe Cronin to discuss the A's relocation plans. United States Senator Stuart Symington attended the meeting and discussed the possibility of revoking baseball's antitrust exemption if the A's were allowed to leave Kansas City. The owners began deliberation and after the first ballot, only six owners were in favour of relocation. The owner of Baltimore voted against, while the ownership for Cleveland, New York and Washington had abstained. In the second ballot, the New York Yankees voted in favour of the Athletics' relocation to Oakland. To appease all interested parties, the Athletics announced that MLB would expand to Kansas City and Seattle no later than the 1971 MLB season.
