= 1973 Los Angeles Dodgers season =

1973 Los Angeles Dodgers
- League: National League
- Division: West
- Ballpark: Dodger Stadium
- City: Los Angeles
- Record: 95–66 (.590)
- Divisional place: 2nd
- Owners: Walter O'Malley, James Mulvey
- President: Peter O'Malley
- General managers: Al Campanis
- Managers: Walter Alston
- Television: KTTV (11)
- Radio: KFI; Vin Scully, Jerry Doggett; XEGM; Jaime Jarrín, Rudy Hoyos

The 1973 Los Angeles Dodgers season was the 84th season for the Los Angeles Dodgers franchise in Major League Baseball (MLB), their 16th season in Los Angeles, California, and their 12th season playing their home games at Dodger Stadium in Los Angeles California. The Dodgers finished the season in second place in the National League West with a record of 95–66.

From June 17 through September 2, the Dodgers held first place in their division. At one point, on July 17, LA had an 8.5 game lead over the Reds. On September 4, they relinquished their lead to the Reds, and despite winning their last five contests of the season in a row, the Dodgers finished 3.5 games behind.

== Offseason ==
- October 26, 1972: Larry Hisle was traded by the Dodgers to the St. Louis Cardinals for Rudy Arroyo and Greg Milliken (minors).
- November 28, 1972: Frank Robinson, Bill Singer, Mike Strahler, Billy Grabarkewitz and Bobby Valentine were traded by the Dodgers to the California Angels for Andy Messersmith and Ken McMullen.
- March 26, 1973: George Culver was purchased by the Dodgers from the Houston Astros.
- March 27, 1973: Dick Dietz was purchased from the Dodgers by the Atlanta Braves.

== Regular season ==
=== Season standings ===
NL West
Team	W	L	Pct.	GB	Home	Road
Cincinnati Reds	99	63	.611	—	50‍–‍31	49‍–‍32
Los Angeles Dodgers	95	66	.590	3½	50‍–‍31	45‍–‍35
San Francisco Giants	88	74	.543	11	47‍–‍34	41‍–‍40
Houston Astros	82	80	.506	17	41‍–‍40	41‍–‍40
Atlanta Braves	76	85	.472	22½	40‍–‍40	36‍–‍45
San Diego Padres	60	102	.370	39	31‍–‍50	29‍–‍52

=== Record vs. opponents ===
1973 National League record Sources:
Team	ATL	CHC	CIN	HOU	LAD	MON	NYM	PHI	PIT	SD	SF	STL
Atlanta	—	7–5	5–13	11–7	2–15–1	6–6	6–6	6–6	7–5	12–6	8–10	6–6
Chicago	5–7	—	8–4	6–6	5–7	9–9	10–7	10–8	6–12	7–5	2–10	9–9
Cincinnati	13–5	4–8	—	11–7	11–7	8–4	8–4	8–4	7–5	13–5	10–8	6–6
Houston	7–11	6–6	7–11	—	11–7	6–6	6–6	7–5	6–6	10–8	11–7	5–7
Los Angeles	15–2–1	7–5	7–11	7–11	—	7–5	7–5	9–3	10–2	9–9	9–9	8–4
Montreal	6–6	9–9	4–8	6–6	5–7	—	9–9	13–5	6–12	7–5	6–6	8–10
New York	6–6	7–10	4–8	6–6	5–7	9–9	—	9–9	13–5	8–4	5–7	10–8
Philadelphia	6–6	8–10	4–8	5–7	3–9	5–13	9–9	—	8–10	9–3	5–7	9–9
Pittsburgh	5–7	12–6	5–7	6–6	2–10	12–6	5–13	10–8	—	8–4	5–7	10–8
San Diego	6–12	5–7	5–13	8–10	9–9	5–7	4–8	3–9	4–8	—	7–11	4–8
San Francisco	10–8	10–2	8–10	7–11	9–9	6–6	7–5	7–5	7–5	11–7	—	6–6
St. Louis	6–6	9–9	6–6	7–5	4–8	10–8	8–10	9–9	8–10	8–4	6–6	—

=== Opening Day lineup ===
Opening Day starters
Name	Position
Lee Lacy	Second baseman
Manny Mota	Left fielder
Bill Buckner	First baseman
Willie Davis	Center fielder
Willie Crawford	Right fielder
Joe Ferguson	Catcher
Ken McMullen	Third baseman
Bill Russell	Shortstop
Don Sutton	Starting pitcher

=== Notable transactions ===
- April 24, 1973: Tim Johnson was traded by the Dodgers to the Milwaukee Brewers for Rick Auerbach.
- August 10, 1973: George Culver was purchased from the Dodgers by the Philadelphia Phillies.

=== Memorable events ===
On June 13 in a game versus the Philadelphia Phillies at Veterans Stadium, Steve Garvey, Davey Lopes, Ron Cey and Bill Russell play together as an infield for the Dodgers for first time, going on to set the record of staying together for 8½ years.

=== Roster ===
1973 Los Angeles Dodgers
Roster
Pitchers: 21 Jim Brewer; 40 George Culver; 44 Al Downing; 29 Greg Heydeman; 49 Charlie Hough; 25 Tommy John; 47 Andy Messersmith; 23 Claude Osteen; 31 Doug Rau; 45 Pete Richert; 41 Greg Shanahan; 50 Eddie Solomon; 20 Don Sutton; 38 Geoff Zahn	Catchers: 14 Chris Cannizzaro; 13 Joe Ferguson; 7 Steve Yeager; Infielders: 22 Bill Buckner; 10 Ron Cey; 6 Steve Garvey; 34 Lee Lacy; 15 Davey Lopes; 5 Ken McMullen; 8 Jerry Royster; 18 Bill Russell	Outfielders: 27 Willie Crawford; 3 Willie Davis; 12 Von Joshua; 11 Manny Mota; 17 Tom Paciorek; 2 Paul Powell; Other batters: 2 Orlando Alvarez; 28 Jim Fairey	Manager: 24 Walter Alston; Coaches: 26 Red Adams; 54 Monty Basgall; 19 Jim Gilliam; 52 Tommy Lasorda; 51 Dixie Walker

== Game log ==
=== Regular season ===
Legend
	Dodgers win
	Dodgers loss
	Postponement
	Eliminated from playoff race
**Bold**	Dodgers team member

1973 regular season game log: 95–66–1 (Home: 50–31; Away: 45–35–1)
April: 11–11 (Home: 6–6; Away: 5–5)

#	Date	Time (PT)	Opponent	Score	Win	Loss	Save	Time of Game	Attendance	Record	Box/ Streak
4	April 9		@ Astros	L 1–4						1–3	L1
5	April 10		@ Astros	L 3–4 (12)						1–4	L2
6	April 11		Reds	L 1–4						1–5	L3
7	April 12		Reds	L 2–5						1–6	L4
8	April 13		Braves	**W** 6–3						2–6	W1
9	April 14		Braves	**W** 2–1						3–6	W2
10	April 15		Braves	**W** 6–2						4–6	W3
11	April 16		Astros	**W** 2–1 (13)						5–6	W4
12	April 17		Astros	**W** 7–2						6–6	W5
13	April 18		Astros	L 2–7						6–7	L1
14	April 19		Giants	L 6–7						6–8	L2
15	April 20		Giants	L 3–7						6–9	L3
16	April 21		Giants	**W** 1–0						7–9	W1
17	April 22		Giants	L 2–4						7–10	L1
18	April 24		@ Cardinals	L 0–2						7–11	L2
19	April 25		@ Cardinals	**W** 5–3 (11)						8–11	W1
—	April 27		@ Pirates	Postponed (rain); Makeup: April 29							
20	April 28		@ Pirates	**W** 3–2						9–11	W2
21 (1)	April 29		@ Pirates	**W** 9–8 (11)						10–11	W3
22 (2)	April 29		@ Pirates	**W** 2–1						11–11	W4

May: 19–8–1 (Home: 13–5; Away: 5–3–1)

#	Date	Time (PT)	Opponent	Score	Win	Loss	Save	Time of Game	Attendance	Record	Box/ Streak
23	May 1		Cubs	L 5–9						112–12	L1
24	May 2		Cubs	**W** 4–1						12–12	W1
25	May 3		Cubs	L 1–4						12–13	W1
26	May 4		Cardinals	**W** 6–5 (10)						13–13	W1
27	May 5		Cardinals	**W** 11–3						14–13	W2
28	May 6		Cardinals	**W** 3–0						15–13	W3
29	May 7		Pirates	L 4–5						15–14	L1
30	May 8		Pirates	**W** 7–4						16–14	W1
31	May 9		Pirates	**W** 8–5						17–14	W2
32	May 11		@ Giants	**W** 3–2						18–14	W3
33	May 12		@ Giants	L 4–5						18–15	L1
34	May 13		@ Giants	**W** 15–3						19–15	W1
35	May 15		@ Reds	L 1–4						19–16	L1
36	May 16		@ Reds	**W** 8–6 (11)						20–16	W1
37	May 17		@ Reds	**W** 3–1						21–16	W2
38	May 18		@ Braves	**W** 3–2						22–16	W3
39	May 19		@ Braves	T 7–7 (13)						22–16–1	T1
40 (1)	May 20		@ Braves	L 2–3 (10)						22–17–1	L1
41 (2)	May 20		@ Braves	**W** 8–3						22–17–1	W1
44	May 24		Mets	L 3–7 (19)						24–19–1	L2
45	May 25		Mets	**W** 6–4						25–19–1	W1
46	May 26		Mets	**W** 9–5						26–19–1	W2
47	May 27		Mets	**W** 2–1						27–19–1	W3

June: 21–8 (Home: 8–3; Away: 13–5)

#	Date	Time (PT)	Opponent	Score	Win	Loss	Save	Time of Game	Attendance	Record	Box/ Streak
51	June 1		Expos	**W** 3–2						31–19–1	W7
52	June 2		Expos	L 3–6						31–20–1	L1
53	June 3		Expos	L 1–4						31–21–1	L2
54	June 5		@ Cubs	**W** 10–1						32–21–1	W1
55	June 6		@ Cubs	L 4–6						32–22–1	L1
56	June 7		@ Cubs	**W** 4–0						33–22–1	W1
57	June 8		@ Mets	**W** 5–3						34–22–1	W2
58	June 9		@ Mets	L 2–4						34–23–1	L1
59	June 10		@ Mets	**W** 4–0						35–23–1	W1
63	June 15		@ Expos	L 3–4						37–25–1	L2
64	June 15		@ Expos	**W** 6–3						38–25–1	W1
65	June 17		@ Expos	**W** 3–2 (12)						39–25–1	W2
66	June 18		Braves	**W** 13–3						40–25–1	W3
67	June 19		Braves	**W** 3–0						41–25–1	W4
68	June 20		Braves	**W** 6–5 (11)						42–25–1	W5
69	June 21		Braves	**W** 5–0						43–25–1	W6
70	June 22		Reds	**W** 3–2 (10)						44–25–1	W7
71 (1)	June 23		Reds	L 1–4						44–26–1	L1
72 (2)	June 23		Reds	**W** 5–1						45–26–1	W1
73	June 24		Reds	**W** 5–2						46–26–1	W2
76 (1)	June 28		@ Braves	L 2–3						48–27–1	L1
77 (2)	June 28		@ Braves	**W** 8–3						49–27–1	W1
78	June 29		@ Braves	**W** 12–9 (12)						50–27–1	W2
79	June 30		@ Reds	**W** 8–7 (13)						51–27–1	W3

July: 15–13 (Home: 11–6; Away: 4–7)

#	Date	Time (PT)	Opponent	Score	Win	Loss	Save	Time of Game	Attendance	Record	Box/ Streak
80 (1)	July 1		@ Reds	L 3–4						51–28–1	L1
81 (2)	July 1		@ Reds	L 2–3 (10)						51–29–1	L2
82	July 2		@ Reds	L 2–4						51–30–1	L3
86	July 6		Pirates	**W** 3–2						52–33–1	W1
87	July 7		Pirates	**W** 8–6						53–33–1	W2
88	July 8		Pirates	**W** 3–2 (12)						54–33–1	W3
89	July 10		Cardinals	L 4–5						54–34–1	L1
90	July 11		Cardinals	**W** 3–1						55–34–1	W1
91	July 12		Cardinals	**W** 4–0						56–34–1	W2
92	July 13		Cubs	**W** 5–0						57–34–1	W3
93	July 14		Cubs	**W** 7–3						58–34–1	W4
94	July 15		Cubs	**W** 9–3						59–34–1	W5
95	July 16		@ Pirates	**W** 1–0						60–34–1	W6
96	July 17		@ Pirates	**W** 8–4						61–34–1	W7
97	July 18		@ Pirates	L 3–7						61–35–1	L1
98	July 19		@ Cardinals	**W** 3–2						62–35–1	W6
99	July 20		@ Cardinals	**W** 4–3 \(15)						63–35–1	WL2
100	July 21		@ Cardinals	L 1–8						63–36–1	L1
101	July 22		@ Cardinals	L 4–5						63–37–1	L2
—	July 24	5:15 p.m. PDT	44th All-Star Game	National League vs. American League (Royals Stadium, Kansas City, Missouri							
102	July 26		Astros	**W** 3–1						64–37–1	W1
103	July 27		Astros	L 2–5						64–38–1	L1
104	July 28		Giants	L 0–5						64–39–1	L2
105	July 29		Giants	**W** 6–2						65–39–1	W1
105	July 30		Giants	**W** 5–2						66–39–1	W2
107	July 31		@ Astros	L 2–3						66–40–1	L1

August: 17–12 (Home: 6–4; Away: 11–8)

#	Date	Time (PT)	Opponent	Score	Win	Loss	Save	Time of Game	Attendance	Record	Box/ Streak
108	August 1		@ Astros	L 0–5						66–41–1	L2
109	August 2		@ Astros	**W** 4–2 (11)						67–41–1	W1
110	August 3		@ Giants	**W** 3–0						68–41–1	W2
111	August 4		@ Giants	L 2–3 (11)						68–42–1	L1
112	August 5		@ Giants	**W** 4–3						69–42–1	W1
115	August 8		Mets	L 0–1						71–43–1	L1
116	August 9		Mets	**W** 1–0						72–43–1	W1
120	August 13		Expos	**W** 8–5						74–45–1	W2
121	August 14		Expos	**W** 4–3						75–45–1	W3
122	August 15		Expos	**W** 7–2						76–45–1	W4
123	August 17		@ Cubs	L 1–5						76–46–1	L1
124	August 18		@ Cubs	L 1–2						76–47–1	L2
125	August 19		@ Cubs	**W** 2–1						77–47–1	W1
126	August 21		@ Mets	L 1–2						77–48–1	L1
127	August 22		@ Mets	L 3–4						77–49–1	L2
128	August 23		@ Mets	**W** 5–4						78–49–1	W1
132	August 27		@ Expos	L 0–4						81–50–1	L1
133	August 28		@ Expos	**W** 6–1						82–50–1	W1
134	August 29		@ Expos	L 5–6						82–51–1	L1
135	August 30		Astros	**W** 6–5						83–51–1	W1
136	August 31		Astros	L 2–3						83–52–1	L1

September: 12–14 (Home: 6–7; Away: 6–7)

#	Date	Time (PT)	Opponent	Score	Win	Loss	Save	Time of Game	Attendance	Record	Box/ Streak
137	September 1		Astros	L 0–2						83–53–1	L2
138	September 2		Astros	L 0–9						83–54–1	L3
139	September 3		@ Giants	L 8–11						83–55–1	L4
140	September 4		@ Giants	L 1–3						83–56–1	L5
141	September 5		@ Giants	L 0–7						83–57–1	L6
146	September 11		@ Reds	L 3–6						84–61–1	L1
147	September 12		@ Reds	L 3–7						84–62–1	L2
148	September 13		@ Astros	**W** 8–6						85–62–1	W1
149	September 14		@ Astros	**W** 13–1						86–62–1	W2
150	September 15		@ Astros	L 1–5						86–63–1	L1
151	September 16		@ Astros	L 2–6						86–64–1	L2
152	September 17		Giants	**W** 7–2						87–64–1	W1
153	September 18		Giants	**W** 3–1						88–64–1	W2
154	September 19		Braves	**W** 4–1						89–64–1	W3
155	September 20		Braves	**W** 5–3 (12)						90–64–1	W4
156	September 21		Reds	L 1–4 (10)						90–65–1	L1
157	September 22		Reds	L 9–11						90–66–1	L2
158	September 23		Reds	**W** 6–4						91–66–1	W1
159	September 25		@ Braves	**W** 5–1						92–66–1	W2
160	September 26		@ Braves	**W** 9–8						93–66–1	W3
—	September 27		@ Braves	Cancelled (rain); Not rescheduled							

=== Detailed records ===
**National League**
Opponent	Home	Away	Total	Pct.	Runs scored	Runs allowed
**NL East**
Chicago Cubs	4–2	3–3	7–5	.583	53	35
Montreal Expos	4–2	3–3	7–5	.583	49	42
New York Mets	4–2	3–3	7–5	.583	41	35
Pittsburgh Pirates	5–1	5–1	10–2	.833	58	42
St. Louis Cardinals	5–1	3–3	8–4	.667	48	37
	**22–8**	**17–13**	**39–21**	**.650**	**249**	**191**
**NL West**
Atlanta Braves	9–0	6–2	15–2	.882	99	50
Cincinnati Reds	4–5	3–6	7–11	.389	66	79
Houston Astros	4–5	3–6	7–11	.389	58	71
**Los Angeles Dodgers**	—	—	—	—	—	—
San Francisco Giants	5–4	4–5	9–9	.500	73	68
	**22–13**	**16–19**	**38–33**	**.535**	**296**	**268**

== Player stats ==
=== Batting ===
==== Starters by position ====
Note: Pos = Position; G = Games played; AB = At bats; H = Hits; Avg. = Batting average; HR = Home runs; RBI = Runs batted in

Pos	Player	G	AB	H	Avg.	HR	RBI
C	Joe Ferguson	136	487	128	.263	25	88
1B	Bill Buckner	140	575	158	.275	8	46
2B	Davey Lopes	142	535	147	.275	6	37
SS	Bill Russell	162	615	163	.265	4	56
3B	Ron Cey	152	507	124	.245	15	80
LF	Manny Mota	89	293	92	.314	0	23
CF	Willie Davis	152	599	171	.285	16	77
RF	Willie Crawford	145	457	135	.295	14	66

==== Other batters ====
Note: G = Games played; AB = At bats; H = Hits; Avg. = Batting average; HR = Home runs; RBI = Runs batted in

Player	G	AB	H	Avg.	HR	RBI
Steve Garvey	114	349	106	.304	8	50
Tom Paciorek	96	195	51	.262	5	18
Von Joshua	75	159	40	.252	2	17
Lee Lacy	57	135	28	.207	0	8
Steve Yeager	54	134	34	.254	2	10
Ken McMullen	42	85	21	.247	5	18
Chris Cannizzaro	17	21	4	.190	0	3
Jerry Royster	10	19	4	.211	0	2
Jim Fairey	10	9	2	.222	0	0
Orlando Álvarez	4	4	1	.250	0	0
Paul Powell	2	1	0	.000	0	0

=== Pitching ===
==== Starting pitchers ====
Note: G = Games pitched; IP = Innings pitched; W = Wins; L = Losses; ERA = Earned run average; SO = Strikeouts

Player	G	IP	W	L	ERA	SO
Don Sutton	33	256.1	18	10	2.42	200
Andy Messersmith	33	249.2	14	10	2.70	177
Claude Osteen	33	236.2	16	11	3.31	86
Tommy John	36	218.0	16	7	3.10	116
Al Downing	30	193.0	9	9	3.31	124

==== Other pitchers ====
Note: G = Games pitched; IP = Innings pitched; W = Wins; L = Losses; ERA = Earned run average; SO = Strikeouts

Player	G	IP	W	L	ERA	SO
Geoff Zahn	6	13.1	1	0	1.35	9

==== Relief pitchers ====
Note: G = Games pitched; W = Wins; L = Losses; SV = Saves; ERA = Earned run average; SO = Strikeouts

Player	G	W	L	SV	ERA	SO
Jim Brewer	56	6	8	20	3.01	56
Pete Richert	39	3	3	7	3.18	31
Charlie Hough	37	4	2	5	2.76	70
Doug Rau	31	4	2	3	3.96	51
George Culver	28	4	4	2	3.00	23
Greg Shanahan	7	0	0	1	3.45	11
Eddie Solomon	4	0	0	0	7.11	6
Greg Heydeman	1	0	0	0	4.50	1

== Awards and honors ==
- Gold Glove Award
  - Willie Davis
- NL Player of the Month
  - Willie Crawford (May 1973)
- NL Player of the Week
  - Andy Messersmith (May 14–20)
  - Willie Crawford (May 21–27)
  - Willie Davis (July 9–15)

=== All-Stars ===
- 1973 Major League Baseball All-Star Game
  - Jim Brewer reserve
  - Willie Davis reserve
  - Manny Mota reserve
  - Claude Osteen reserve
  - Bill Russell reserve
  - Don Sutton reserve
- TSN National League All-Stars
  - Bill Russell
- Baseball Digest Rookie All-Stars
  - Ron Cey
  - Davey Lopes

== Farm system ==
Level	Team	League	Manager
AAA	Albuquerque Dukes	Pacific Coast League	Stan Wasiak
AA	Waterbury Dodgers	Eastern League	Don LeJohn
A	Bakersfield Dodgers	California League	George Freese
A	Daytona Beach Dodgers	Florida State League	Bart Shirley
A-Short Season	Bellingham Dodgers	Northwest League	Bill Berrier
Rookie	Ogden Dodgers	Pioneer League	Gail Henley

== 1973 Major League Baseball draft ==
This was the ninth year of a Major League Baseball draft. The Dodgers drafted 22 players in the June draft and nine in the January draft. Six players eventually played in MLB.

The most notable player from this draft class was outfielder Joe Simpson, who played from 1975 to 1983 but made his mark primarily as a broadcaster for the Atlanta Braves. The Dodgers first round pick was catcher Ted Farr of Shadle Park High School in Spokane, Washington. He played 339 games from 1973 to 1977 in the Dodgers farm system, hitting .235.

1973 draft picks

=== January draft ===
Round	Name	Position	School	Signed	Career span	Highest level
1	Wes Moore	RHP	Yavapai College	Yes	1973–1975	A
2	Michael Boyd	OF	Chipola College	No		
3	Bob McClure	LHP	College of San Mateo	No; Royals-1973	1973–1993	MLB
4	Jeff Moore	1B	Middle Georgia College	No		
5	Jeff Hill	OF	Phoenix College	No		
6	Terry Nance	P	Monterey Peninsula College	No		

==== January secondary phase ====
Round	Name	Position	School	Signed	Career span	Highest level
1	Guy Todd	RHP	Blinn College	Yes	1973–1976	AA
2	Bob Purkey	RHP	Gulf Coast Community College	No		
3	Craig Minetto	LHP	San Joaquin Delta College	No; Expos-1974	1974–1984	MLB

=== June draft ===
Round	Name	Position	School	Signed	Career span	Highest level
1	Ted Farr	C	Shadle Park High School	Yes	1973–1977	AAA
2	Mike Paciorek	SS	St. Mary's High School	Yes	1973–1977	A
3	Joe Simpson	OF	University of Oklahoma	Yes	1973–1984	MLB
4	Richard Hance	3B	California State University, Fresno	Yes	1973–1977	AA
5	Thomas Steinmetz	SS	Canevin Catholic High School	No; Expos-1978	1978	A-
6	Mike Dimmel	OF	Logansport High School	Yes	1973–1980	MLB
7	David Richards	C	Proviso East High School	Yes	1973–1982	AAA
8	Bradford Drysdale	RHP	Brawley Union High School	No; Orioles – 1974	1974–1975	Rookie
9	Bob Stanley	RHP	Kearny High School	No; Red Sox-1974	1974–1989	MLB
10	Mark Wilson	OF	Ashland High School	No; Twins	1975	A
11	Charles Barrett	RHP	Rancho High School	Yes	1973–1978	AAA
12	William Collins	RHP	University of South Alabama	Yes	1973	A
13	Daniel Smith	RHP	Covina High School	Yes	1973–1980	AAA
14	James Mitchell	SS	Cardinal Mooney High School	Yes	1974–1978	A
15	Kelly Snider	1B	Hillcrest High School	No; Dodgers-1976	1976–1982	AAA
16	Edward Davis	3B	West Jefferson High School	Yes	1973	Rookie
17	Robert Arceneaux	C	Manual Arts High School	No		
18	Tom Dixon	RHP	William R. Boone High School	No; Cardinals-1974	1974–1983	MLB
19	Charles James	OF	Manual Arts High School	No; Orioles-1974	1974–1976	A
20	George Kunkler	LHP	Lindbergh High School	No; Dodgers-1976	1976–1977	AA
21	Russell Holland	RHP	Parksley High School	Yes	1973	Rookie

==== June secondary phase ====
Round	Name	Position	School	Signed	Career span	Highest level
1	William Meyer	SS	University of Michigan	Yes	1973–1976	AA
