= Pete Richert =

American baseball player (born 1939)

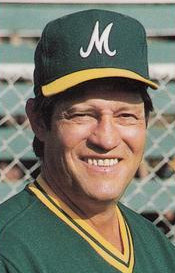
- Richert in 1988
- Pitcher
- Born: October 29, 1939 (age 86); Floral Park, New York, U.S.
- Batted: Left Threw: Left

MLB debut
- April 12, 1962, for the Los Angeles Dodgers

Last MLB appearance
- September 2, 1974, for the Philadelphia Phillies

MLB statistics
- Win–loss record: 80–73
- Earned run average: 3.19
- Strikeouts: 925
- Stats at Baseball Reference

Teams
- Los Angeles Dodgers (1962–1964); Washington Senators (1965–1967); Baltimore Orioles (1967–1971); Los Angeles Dodgers (1972–1973); St. Louis Cardinals (1974); Philadelphia Phillies (1974)

Career highlights and awards
- 2× All-Star (1965, 1966); 2× World Series champion (1963, 1970)

Peter Gerard Richert (born October 29, 1939) is an American former professional baseball player. He played in Major League Baseball as a left-handed pitcher with the Los Angeles Dodgers (1962–64, 1972–73), Washington Senators (1965–67), Baltimore Orioles (1967–71), St. Louis Cardinals (1974) and Philadelphia Phillies (1974).

== Early life ==
Richert was born on October 29, 1939, in Floral Park, New York. He attended Sewanhaka High School, which he led as a senior to the Long Island baseball championship. As a high school pitcher, at only 5 ft 7 in and 145 pounds, he was not heavily scouted, but he was scouted and signed by the Brooklyn Dodgers in 1957. (By the time he played major league baseball, he was listed as 5 ft 11 in and 165 pounds.) A native Long Islander, Richert thought he would be playing close to home, but found out shortly after signing that the Dodgers would be moving to Los Angeles the following year, being the last person ever signed by the Brooklyn Dodgers.

== Baseball career ==
=== Minor league ===
In 1958, Richert was assigned to the Reno Silver Fox of the Class C California League, starting 27 of the 31 games in which he played. He played all or part of the following six years in the Dodgers' minor league system, as a starting pitcher for the most part. In 1959, he set the Class B Illinois-Indiana-Iowa League record with 18 strikeouts in a playoff game, playing for the Green Bay Blue Jays. In Green Bay, he struck out 173 batters in 156 innings.

1960 was his best minor league year, playing for the Double-A Atlanta Crackers of the Southern Association, with a 19–9 win-loss record, 2.76 earned run average (ERA), 251 strikeouts in 225 innings, 18 complete games and six shutouts. He had a stretch of striking out at least one batter in 23 straight innings. He was the league's Rookie of the Year, and was named to a Double-A baseball All-Star Team. Richert came under the tutelage of player-manager Rube Walker in Atlanta, who greatly developed Richert's pitching skills in preparing him to pitch in the major leagues.

Richert spent all of 1961 with the Triple-A Spokane Indians, where an aging former Dodger pitching star Don Newcombe took Richert under his wing, and taught Richert how to better control his pitches. In the following three years, Richert split time playing Triple-A baseball for the Omaha Dodgers and Spokane, and on the Los Angeles Dodgers.

=== Major league ===
==== Los Angeles Dodgers ====
Richert began 1962 with the Dodgers. In his Major League debut on April 12, 1962, against the Cincinnati Reds at Dodger Stadium, Richert set a record by striking out the first six batters he faced. "He entered the game with two outs in the top of the second inning with his Dodgers trailing 4–0, and struck out Vada Pinson for the final out. Richert then recorded a four-strikeout third inning in which his victims were Frank Robinson (his future Baltimore Orioles teammate), Gordy Coleman (who reached first base on a passed ball by John Roseboro), Wally Post and Johnny Edwards; his record-tying sixth strikeout was of Tommy Harper leading off the fourth." As of 2010, Richert remains the only pitcher to record a four-strikeout inning in his Major League debut.

He also set a Major League record by retiring 12 consecutive batters, the most by a pitcher making his MLB debut as a reliever. Max Scherzer broke this record in 2008 by retiring 13 consecutive batters. Richert won the game in 3 1/3 innings of relief, giving up no hits or walks and striking out seven.

That year, he went 5–4 as a spot starter in a rotation led by the future Hall-of-Fame duo of Don Drysdale and Sandy Koufax. In 1963, he went 5–3 on a Dodgers team which won the World Series. Richert did not pitch in the Series, in which the Dodgers swept the New York Yankees.

==== Washington Senators ====
After the 1964 season, Richert, Frank Howard, Ken McMullen, Dick Nen and Phil Ortega were traded to the Washington Senators for pitcher Claude Osteen, infielder John Kennedy and $100,000 cash. Richert's two full seasons with the Senators, 1965 and 1966, were the two best seasons of his career as a starter. In the former he won a career-high 15 games with a 2.60 earned run average, also a career high. In the latter, Richert went 14–14 with a 3.37 ERA and set a career-high with 195 strikeouts. He struck out seven consecutive batters in an April 24 game against the Detroit Tigers in the latter year, a record at the time, but still lost, 4–0.

Richert was also an All-Star during both seasons. In the 1965 All-Star Game, he pitched two scoreless innings, and struck out Willie Mays and Willie Stargell. He was the losing pitcher in the 1966 game, giving up a single to former Dodgers teammate Maury Wills, which scored Tim McCarver for the winning run in the 10th inning.

==== Baltimore Orioles ====
He started ten of eleven games and was 2–6 with a 4.64 ERA before being acquired by the Baltimore Orioles from the Senators for Mike Epstein and Frank Bertaina on 29 May 1967. Richert went 7–10 with the Orioles in his final season as a starter.

Orioles manager Hank Bauer, who originally had been impressed by Richert's success against the Orioles while playing for the Senators, believed Richert would be more successful as a relief pitcher, for both Richert and the team. In 1968 he went 6–3 with a 3.47 earned run average in his first season as a relief pitcher. Richert would go on to pitch in relief for Orioles teams that played in three consecutive World Series from 1969 to 1971.

In 1969, he went 7–4 with 12 saves and a 2.20 ERA, appearing in 44 games as a reliever. The Orioles lost the World Series in surprising fashion to the New York Mets, and Richert was involved in a controversial play which ended Game 4. In the bottom of the 10th, with the game tied at 1–1, J. C. Martin laid down a bunt and was hit by Richert's throw; the error allowed Rod Gaspar to score the winning run from second. Television replays later showed Martin was running inside the baseline, which could have resulted in him being called out for interference.

In 1970, Richert went 7–2 with 13 saves and a 1.98 ERA, appearing in 50 games as a reliever. Richert believed it was his best year, with two different streaks of 8.2 consecutive hitless innings in relief. He was a member of the championship team that year, the Orioles defeating the Cincinnati Reds in five games. Richert saved Game 1 of that Series in relief of Jim Palmer. In 1971, Richert pitched his fewest games during the Orioles' three-year Word Series run (35), his ERA rose to 3.47 and he only had four saves.

=== Dodgers, Cardinals, and Phillies ===
Richert returned to the Dodgers upon being traded, along with Frank Robinson, from the Orioles for Doyle Alexander, Bob O'Brien, Sergio Robles and Royle Stillman at the Winter Meetings on December 2, 1971. In 1972, he pitched in 37 games for the Dodgers with a 2.25 ERA and six saves, and in 1973, he pitched in 39 games for them, with a 3.18 ERA and seven saves. After the season, he was dealt from the Dodgers to the Cardinals for Tommie Agee at the Winter Meetings on December 5, 1973. In 13 games for the Cardinals in 1974, he had a 2.38 ERA, but the Cardinals sold his rights to the Philadelphia Phillies on June 21st of that year. In what would be his final season, he pitched in 21 games for the Phillies with a 2.21 ERA. After pitching in a September game, he learned he had a blood clot in his shoulder that required surgery, that ultimately involved moving a vein in his body, and necessitated his retirement.

During a 13-year baseball career, Richert compiled 80 wins, 925 strikeouts in 1165.2 innings, and a 3.19 earned run average. As of 2024, he ranks 177th all-time in strikeouts per nine innings.

== Coaching and executive ==
After retiring, Richert worked as a pitching coach and assistant general manager in the minor leagues for teams in the Pacific Coast League and California League. He originally became a minor league pitching coach through the recommendation of former Orioles teammate Merv Rettenmund, and did that for 14 years, 12 with the Oakland Athletics' farm system.

== Post-baseball life ==
After retiring, he worked at various jobs, including work in Palm Springs for the Winston Tire Company.

Richert created Athletes for Youth, an organization speaking to youth about the dangers of drug use; he also visited methadone treatment centers to speak with addicts.

He and his wife, Adele, have three children.

== See also ==
- List of Major League Baseball single-inning strikeout leaders
