= 1967 Detroit Tigers season =

Major League Baseball season

1967 Detroit Tigers
- League: American League
- Ballpark: Tiger Stadium
- City: Detroit, Michigan
- Record: 91–71 (.562)
- League place: T–2nd
- Owners: John Fetzer
- General managers: Jim Campbell
- Managers: Mayo Smith
- Television: WJBK (George Kell, Larry Osterman)
- Radio: WJR (Ernie Harwell, Ray Lane)

The 1967 Detroit Tigers season was the team's 67th season and the 56th season at Tiger Stadium. The team finished tied for second in the American League with the Minnesota Twins with 91 wins and 71 losses, one game behind the AL pennant-winning Boston Red Sox.

The season is notable as during the middle of the 1967 season, a number of home games were cancelled due to the 1967 Detroit riot; this would be the last time a game would be cancelled due to rioting, until the 1992 LA Dodgers had their games cancelled due to the 1992 riots.

== Regular season ==
- On April 30, 1967, Baltimore Orioles pitcher Steve Barber threw a no-hitter versus the Detroit Tigers but lost in a 2–1 final. Barber would become the first pitcher in the history of the American League whose no-hit game ended in a loss.

=== Season standings ===
American League
Team	W	L	Pct.	GB	Home	Road
Boston Red Sox	92	70	.568	—	49‍–‍32	43‍–‍38
Detroit Tigers	91	71	.562	1	52‍–‍29	39‍–‍42
Minnesota Twins	91	71	.562	1	52‍–‍29	39‍–‍42
Chicago White Sox	89	73	.549	3	49‍–‍33	40‍–‍40
California Angels	84	77	.522	7½	53‍–‍30	31‍–‍47
Washington Senators	76	85	.472	15½	40‍–‍40	36‍–‍45
Baltimore Orioles	76	85	.472	15½	35‍–‍42	41‍–‍43
Cleveland Indians	75	87	.463	17	36‍–‍45	39‍–‍42
New York Yankees	72	90	.444	20	43‍–‍38	29‍–‍52
Kansas City Athletics	62	99	.385	29½	37‍–‍44	25‍–‍55

=== Record vs. opponents ===
1967 American League record Sources:
Team	BAL	BOS	CAL	CWS	CLE	DET	KCA	MIN	NYY	WAS
Baltimore	—	10–8	6–11	7–11	9–9	3–15	10–8	8–10	13–5	10–8
Boston	8–10	—	10–8	8–10	13–5	11–7	12–6	7–11	12–6	11–7
California	11–6	8–10	—	7–11	14–4	8–10	14–4	7–11	9–9	6–12
Chicago	11–7	10–8	11–7	—	12–6	8–10	8–10	9–9	12–6	8–10
Cleveland	9–9	5–13	4–14	6–12	—	8–10	11–7	10–8	9–9	13–5
Detroit	15–3	7–11	10–8	10–8	10–8	—	12–6	8–10–1	10–8	9–9
Kansas City	8–10	6–12	4–14	10–8	7–11	6–12	—	8–10	7–11	6–11
Minnesota	10–8	11–7	11–7	9–9	8–10	10–8–1	10–8	—	12–6–1	10–8
New York	5–13	6–12	9–9	6–12	9–9	8–10	11–7	6–12–1	—	12–6
Washington	8–10	7–11	12–6	10–8	5–13	9–9	11–6	8–10	6–12	—

=== Notable transactions ===
- June 6, 1967: Geoff Zahn was drafted by the Tigers in the 2nd round of the secondary phase of the 1967 Major League Baseball draft, but did not sign.

=== Roster ===
1967 Detroit Tigers
Roster
Pitchers: 37 Hank Aguirre; 40 Pat Dobson; 20 Fred Gladding; 18 John Hiller; 30 Johnny Klippstein; 19 George Korince; 15 Fred Lasher; 29 Mickey Lolich; 28 Mike Marshall; 17 Denny McLain; 27 Bill Monbouquette; 28 Orlando Peña; 22 Johnny Podres; 15 Larry Sherry; 21 Joe Sparma; 14 Dave Wickersham; 16 Earl Wilson	Catchers: 11 Bill Freehan; 38 Bill Heath; 34 Jim Price; Infielders: 33 Dave Campbell; 25 Norm Cash; 9 Jerry Lumpe; 43 Tom Matchick; 7 Eddie Mathews; 3 Dick McAuliffe; 1 Ray Oyler; 44 Dick Tracewski; 8 Don Wert; 2 Jake Wood	Outfielders: 26 Gates Brown; 39 Wayne Comer; 30 Lenny Green; 23 Willie Horton; 6 Al Kaline; 4 Jim Landis; 5 Jim Northrup; 24 Mickey Stanley	Manager: 10 Mayo Smith; Coaches: 50 Tony Cuccinello; 51 Wally Moses; 52 Hal Naragon; 53 Johnny Sain

== Player stats ==
=== Batting ===
==== Starters by position ====
Note: Pos = Position; G = Games played; AB = At bats; H = Hits; Avg. = Batting average; HR = Home runs; RBI = Runs batted in

Pos	Player	G	AB	H	Avg.	HR	RBI
C	Bill Freehan	155	517	146	.282	20	74
1B	Norm Cash	152	488	118	.242	22	72
2B	Dick McAuliffe	153	557	133	.239	22	65
SS	Ray Oyler	148	367	76	.207	1	29
3B	Don Wert	142	534	137	.257	6	40
LF	Willie Horton	122	401	110	.274	19	67
CF	Mickey Stanley	145	333	70	.210	7	24
RF	Al Kaline	131	458	141	.308	25	78

==== Other batters ====
Note: G = Games played; AB = At bats; H = Hits; Avg. = Batting average; HR = Home runs; RBI = Runs batted in

Player	G	AB	H	Avg.	HR	RBI
Jim Northrup	144	495	134	.271	10	61
Jerry Lumpe	81	177	41	.232	4	17
Lenny Green	58	151	42	.278	1	13
Eddie Mathews	36	108	25	.231	6	19
Dick Tracewski	74	107	30	.280	1	8
Jim Price	44	92	24	.261	0	8
Gates Brown	51	91	17	.187	2	9
Jim Landis	25	48	10	.208	2	4
Bill Heath	20	32	4	.125	0	4
Jake Wood	14	20	1	.050	0	0
Tom Matchick	8	6	1	.167	0	0
Wayne Comer	4	3	1	.333	0	0
Dave Campbell	2	2	0	.000	0	0

=== Pitching ===
==== Starting pitchers ====
Note: G = Games pitched; IP = Innings pitched; W = Wins; L = Losses; ERA = Earned run average; SO = Strikeouts

Player	G	IP	W	L	ERA	SO
Earl Wilson	39	264.0	22	11	3.27	184
Denny McLain	37	235.0	17	16	3.79	161
Joe Sparma	37	217.2	16	9	3.76	153
Mickey Lolich	31	204.0	14	13	3.04	174

==== Other pitchers ====
Note: G = Games pitched; IP = Innings pitched; W = Wins; L = Losses; ERA = Earned run average; SO = Strikeouts

Player	G	IP	W	L	ERA	SO
John Hiller	23	65.0	4	3	2.63	49
Johnny Podres	21	63.1	3	1	3.84	34

==== Relief pitchers ====
Note: G = Games pitched; W = Wins; L = Losses; SV = Saves; ERA = Earned run average; SO = Strikeouts

Player	G	W	L	SV	ERA	SO
Fred Gladding	42	6	4	10	1.99	64
Mike Marshall	37	1	3	10	1.98	41
Dave Wickersham	36	4	5	5	2.74	44
Hank Aguirre	31	0	1	0	2.40	33
Pat Dobson	28	1	2	0	2.92	34
Larry Sherry	20	0	1	1	6.43	20
Fred Lasher	17	2	1	9	3.90	28
George Korince	9	1	0	0	5.14	11
Johnny Klippstein	5	0	0	0	5.40	4
Orlando Peña	2	0	1	0	13.50	2
Bill Monbouquette	2	0	0	0	0.00	2

== Farm system ==
Level	Team	League	Manager
AAA	Toledo Mud Hens	International League	Jack Tighe
AA	Montgomery Rebels	Southern League	Frank Carswell
A	Rocky Mount Leafs	Carolina League	Al Federoff
A	Lakeland Tigers	Florida State League	Stubby Overmire
A	Statesville Tigers	Western Carolinas League	Len Okrie
A-Short Season	Erie Tigers	New York–Penn League	Eddie Lyons

LEAGUE CHAMPIONS: Toledo
