= Tony Pierce =

Tony Pierce may refer to:

- Antonio Pierce (born 1978), American National Football League linebacker
- Tony Pierce (baseball) (1946–2013), American Major League Baseball pitcher

== See also ==
- Tony Pierce-Roberts (born 1945), British cinematographer
- Anthony Pierce, Welsh Anglican bishop and convicted sex offender
- Pierce (surname)
