= Nold (surname) =

Nold is a surname. Notable people with the surname include:

- Dick Nold (born 1943), American baseball player
- Wendelin Joseph Nold (1900–1981), American Roman Catholic bishop
- Werner Nold (1933–2024), Canadian film editor
