= 1967 Minnesota Twins season =

1967 Minnesota Twins
- League: American League
- Ballpark: Metropolitan Stadium
- City: Bloomington, Minnesota
- Record: 91–71 (.562)
- Divisional place: 2nd
- Owners: Calvin Griffith (majority owner, with Thelma Griffith Haynes)
- General managers: Calvin Griffith
- Managers: Sam Mele, Cal Ermer
- Television: WTCN-TV
- Radio: 830 WCCO AM (Herb Carneal, Halsey Hall, Merle Harmon)

The 1967 Minnesota Twins season was the 7th season for the Minnesota Twins franchise in the Twin Cities of Minnesota, their 7th season at Metropolitan Stadium and the 67th overall in the American League.

The Twins finished 91–71, tied for second in the American League with the Detroit Tigers. The Twins had a one-game lead on the Red Sox with two games remaining in Boston, but lost both games. A total of 1,483,547 fans attended Twins games, the second highest total in the American League.

== Offseason ==
- December 3, 1966: Bernie Allen and Camilo Pascual were traded by the Twins to the Washington Senators for Ron Kline.

== Regular season ==
With a second-place finish in 1966, the Twins appeared poised to contend in 1967. However, at the end of May, they were in sixth place (in a ten team league), with 20 wins and 22 losses. One week later, owner Calvin Griffith fired manager Sam Mele, who had guided the club to a pennant in 1965. He was replaced by Cal Ermer, who had been managing the Twins AAA farm club in Denver.

On May 21, César Tovar became the first Twin to have a four-extra-base day hitting.

The Twins continued to play .500 ball until late June, when Minnesota reeled off an eight-game winning streak. At the All-Star break, they had risen to third place, two and one half games behind the league leading Chicago White Sox.

On July 26, pitcher Jim Merritt set a club record, pitching the first thirteen innings (and taking a no-decision) in an 18-inning win over the New York Yankees. Facing 46 batters, he allowed just two runs.

Four Twins made the All-Star Game: first baseman Harmon Killebrew, who led the team with 44 HR and 113 RBI; second baseman Rod Carew, the AL Rookie of the Year; outfielder Tony Oliva, and pitcher Dean Chance, a 20-game winner in 1967.

After a brief slump in late July, the Twins began the month of August by winning 15 of 20 games, including a three-game sweep of the White Sox, which put them in first place on August 13. From that point on, they remained in first place, or never more than two games out of it.

Twins pitcher Dean Chance threw the club's second no-hitter on August 25. Earlier in the month, he pitched a perfect five innings on August 6 -- but the game was called for rain and ultimately not counted. On July 28, Chance got his first hit as a Minnesota Twin after going 0 for 53 since arriving from the California Angels.

On September 14, outfielder Walt Bond died of leukemia. Bond had been diagnosed with the disease several years earlier, but it had gone into remission. He started the season with the Twins and played in 10 games before being removed from the active roster. His final game was on May 7.

With one day left in the regular season, Minnesota was tied for first place with the Boston Red Sox, with the Detroit Tigers just a half game behind them. The two first place teams were scheduled to play one another in Fenway Park, while the Tigers were to meet the California Angels in a doubleheader. Dean Chance threw five scoreless innings and the Twins scored unearned runs in the first and third inning to take a 2–0 lead. However, in the sixth inning, things fell apart for the Twins as the Red Sox took advantage of four consecutive singles, two wild pitches, and an error to score five runs. Minnesota mustered only one more run, and lost the game and their chance for a second league championship in three years. The Tigers won their first game, but lost their second, and Boston earned the American League pennant.

Utilityman César Tovar set an American League record by playing in 164 games this season. Pitcher Jim Kaat won his sixth Gold Glove Award.

=== Season standings ===
American League
Team	W	L	Pct.	GB	Home	Road
Boston Red Sox	92	70	.568	—	49‍–‍32	43‍–‍38
Detroit Tigers	91	71	.562	1	52‍–‍29	39‍–‍42
Minnesota Twins	91	71	.562	1	52‍–‍29	39‍–‍42
Chicago White Sox	89	73	.549	3	49‍–‍33	40‍–‍40
California Angels	84	77	.522	7½	53‍–‍30	31‍–‍47
Washington Senators	76	85	.472	15½	40‍–‍40	36‍–‍45
Baltimore Orioles	76	85	.472	15½	35‍–‍42	41‍–‍43
Cleveland Indians	75	87	.463	17	36‍–‍45	39‍–‍42
New York Yankees	72	90	.444	20	43‍–‍38	29‍–‍52
Kansas City Athletics	62	99	.385	29½	37‍–‍44	25‍–‍55

=== Record vs. opponents ===
1967 American League record Sources:
Team	BAL	BOS	CAL	CWS	CLE	DET	KCA	MIN	NYY	WAS
Baltimore	—	10–8	6–11	7–11	9–9	3–15	10–8	8–10	13–5	10–8
Boston	8–10	—	10–8	8–10	13–5	11–7	12–6	7–11	12–6	11–7
California	11–6	8–10	—	7–11	14–4	8–10	14–4	7–11	9–9	6–12
Chicago	11–7	10–8	11–7	—	12–6	8–10	8–10	9–9	12–6	8–10
Cleveland	9–9	5–13	4–14	6–12	—	8–10	11–7	10–8	9–9	13–5
Detroit	15–3	7–11	10–8	10–8	10–8	—	12–6	8–10–1	10–8	9–9
Kansas City	8–10	6–12	4–14	10–8	7–11	6–12	—	8–10	7–11	6–11
Minnesota	10–8	11–7	11–7	9–9	8–10	10–8–1	10–8	—	12–6–1	10–8
New York	5–13	6–12	9–9	6–12	9–9	8–10	11–7	6–12–1	—	12–6
Washington	8–10	7–11	12–6	10–8	5–13	9–9	11–6	8–10	6–12	—

=== Notable transactions ===
- June 6, 1967: 1967 Major League Baseball draft
  - Mike Sadek was drafted by the Twins in the 5th round.
  - Steve Luebber was drafted by the Twins in the 13th round.

=== Roster ===
1967 Minnesota Twins
Roster
Pitchers: 23 Dave Boswell; 32 Dean Chance; 33 Mudcat Grant; 36 Jim Kaat; 27 Ron Kline; 17,26 Jim Merritt; 26 Mel Nelson; 18 Jim Ollom; 31 Jim Perry; 19 Jim Roland; 25 Dwight Siebler; 15 Al Worthington	Catchers: 10 Earl Battey; 21 Hank Izquierdo; 5 Russ Nixon; 22 Jerry Zimmerman; Infielders: 29 Rod Carew; 8 Ron Clark; 24 Jackie Hernández; 3 Harmon Killebrew; 7 Frank Quilici; 20 Rich Reese; 9 Rich Rollins; 2 Zoilo Versalles	Outfielders: 4 Bob Allison; 21 Walt Bond; 30 Carroll Hardy; 24 Andy Kosco; 16 Frank Kostro; 6 Tony Oliva; 12 César Tovar; 11 Ted Uhlaender; 28 Sandy Valdespino; Other batters: 25 Pat Kelly; 35 Graig Nettles	Manager: 14 Sam Mele; 43 Cal Ermer (After June 9); Coaches: 52 Jim Lemon (First base); 1 Billy Martin (Third base); 47 Early Wynn (Pitching)

== Player stats ==
= Indicates team leader

=== Batting ===
= Indicates league leader

==== Starters by position ====
Note: Pos = Position; G = Games played; AB = At bats; H = Hits; Avg. = Batting average; HR = Home runs; RBI = Runs batted in

Pos	Player	G	AB	H	Avg.	HR	RBI
C	Jerry Zimmerman	104	234	39	.167	1	12
1B	Harmon Killebrew	163	547	147	.269	44	113
2B	Rod Carew	137	514	150	.292	8	51
SS	Zoilo Versalles	160	581	116	.200	6	50
3B	Rich Rollins	109	339	83	.245	6	39
LF	Bob Allison	153	496	128	.258	24	75
CF	Ted Uhlaender	133	415	107	.258	6	49
RF	Tony Oliva	146	557	161	.289	17	83

==== Other batters ====
Note: G = Games played; AB = At bats; H = Hits; Avg. = Batting average; HR = Home runs; RBI = Runs batted in

Player	G	AB	H	Avg.	HR	RBI
César Tovar	164	649	173	.267	6	47
Russ Nixon	74	170	40	.235	1	22
Earl Battey	48	109	18	.165	0	8
Rich Reese	95	101	25	.248	4	20
Sandy Valdespino	99	97	16	.165	1	3
Ron Clark	20	60	10	.167	2	11
Frank Kostro	32	31	10	.323	0	2
Andy Kosco	9	28	4	.143	0	4
Jackie Hernández	29	28	4	.143	0	3
Hank Izquierdo	16	26	7	.269	0	2
Frank Quilici	23	19	2	.105	0	0
Walt Bond	10	16	5	.313	1	5
Carroll Hardy	11	8	3	.375	1	2
Graig Nettles	3	3	1	.333	0	0
Pat Kelly	8	1	0	.000	0	0

=== Pitching ===
==== Starting pitchers ====
Note: G = Games pitched; IP = Innings pitched; W = Wins; L = Losses; ERA = Earned run average; SO = Strikeouts

Player	G	IP	W	L	ERA	SO
Dean Chance	41	283.2	20	14	2.73	220
Jim Kaat	42	263.1	16	13	3.04	211
Jim Merritt	37	227.2	13	7	2.53	161
Dave Boswell	37	222.2	14	12	3.27	204

==== Other pitchers ====
Note: G = Games pitched; IP = Innings pitched; W = Wins; L = Losses; ERA = Earned run average; SO = Strikeouts

Player	G	IP	W	L	ERA	SO
Jim Perry	37	130.2	8	7	3.03	94
Mudcat Grant	27	95.1	5	6	4.72	50

==== Relief pitchers ====
Note: G = Games pitched; W = Wins; L = Losses; SV = Saves; ERA = Earned run average; SO = Strikeouts

Player	G	W	L	SV	ERA	SO
Al Worthington	59	8	9	16	2.84	80
Ron Kline	54	7	1	5	3.77	36
Jim Roland	25	0	1	2	3.03	16
Jim Ollom	21	0	1	0	5.40	17
Dwight Siebler	2	0	0	0	3.00	0
Mel Nelson	1	0	0	0	54.00	0

== Farm system ==
Level	Team	League	Manager
AAA	Denver Bears	Pacific Coast League	Cal Ermer and Johnny Goryl
AA	Charlotte Hornets	Southern League	Harry Warner
A	Wilson Tobs	Carolina League	Vern Morgan
A	Orlando Twins	Florida State League	Ralph Rowe
A	Wisconsin Rapids Twins	Midwest League	Ray Bellino
A-Short Season	Auburn Twins	New York–Penn League	Tom Umphlett
A-Short Season	St. Cloud Rox	Northern League	Ken Staples
Rookie	GCL Twins	Gulf Coast League	Fred Waters

LEAGUE CHAMPIONS: Auburn, St. Cloud
