= Ken McMullen (baseball) =

American baseball player (born 1942)

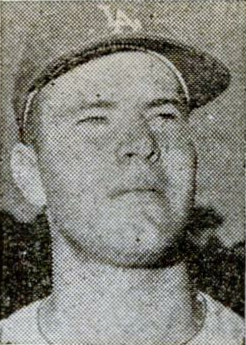
- Third baseman
- Born: June 1, 1942 (age 83); Oxnard, California, U.S.
- Batted: Right Threw: Right

MLB debut
- September 17, 1962, for the Los Angeles Dodgers

Last MLB appearance
- September 14, 1977, for the Milwaukee Brewers

MLB statistics
- Batting average: .248
- Home runs: 156
- Runs batted in: 606
- Stats at Baseball Reference

Teams
- Los Angeles Dodgers (1962–1964); Washington Senators (1965–1970); California Angels (1970–1972); Los Angeles Dodgers (1973–1975); Oakland Athletics (1976); Milwaukee Brewers (1977)

Career highlights and awards
- World Series champion (1963)

Kenneth Lee McMullen (born June 1, 1942) is an American former Major League Baseball third baseman. Born in Oxnard, California, he batted and threw right-handed, stood 6 feet 3 inches (1.91 m) tall and weighed 190 pounds (86 kg).

== Los Angeles Dodgers ==
McMullen signed with the Los Angeles Dodgers upon graduation from Oxnard High School. After two minor league seasons in which he batted .285 with 42 home runs and 177 runs batted in, McMullen made his major league debut as a September call-up in 1962 at just twenty years old. He collected three hits in eleven at-bats.

He was awarded the starting third base job out of Spring training 1963, but after committing five errors while batting just .205 with one home run and three RBIs through April, he was optioned to triple A Spokane. After Manager Walter Alston shifted left fielder Tommy Davis to third, and tried several other players at third base, McMullen was brought back up from Spokane at the end of June. His first major league home run was a grand slam off the St. Louis Cardinals' Ernie Broglio on the Fourth of July. He raised his average to a far more respectable .236 by the end of the season while hitting five home runs with 28 RBIs. He pulled a hamstring on September 26 against the New York Mets and did not play in the World Series against the New York Yankees.

He started the 1964 season with the Dodgers, but poor fielding and a .209 batting average landed him back with the Spokane Indians by the middle of June. At the end of the season, he was traded with Frank Howard, Phil Ortega and Pete Richert to the Washington Senators for John Kennedy and Claude Osteen.

== Washington Senators ==
McMullen won an everyday job batting second for Gil Hodges' Senators. Though he led the American League with 22 errors in 1965, he soon earned a reputation as one of the slicker fielding third basemen in the AL. On August 13, 1965, he tied an AL record by starting four double plays against the Baltimore Orioles. On September 26, 1966, he set an AL record with eleven assists from third against the Boston Red Sox (a mark later tied by Mike Ferraro). He led AL third basemen in total chances over three seasons from 1967 to 1969, and led AL third basemen in double plays in 1967 and putouts in 1969.

McMullen had his first career multi-home run game on July 16, 1967. Later in the same month, he embarked on a career-high 19-game hit streak, which saw him hit a game-winning home run to end a twenty inning marathon with the Minnesota Twins on August 9. He batted a career-high .272 while driving in a career-high 87 runs in 1969. In all, he clubbed 86 home runs and drove in 327 during five plus seasons with the Senators. Shortly into the 1970 season, he was dealt to the California Angels for Rick Reichardt and Aurelio Rodríguez.

== California Angels ==
After a subpar first season in California, McMullen rebounded in 1971 to hit a career-high 21 home runs. On July 17, 1971, McMullen scored from third on a sacrifice bunt by Bruce Christensen, giving his rookie teammate his first major league RBI. He had a 17-game hit streak from July 23 to August 16, 1972. On November 28, 1972, McMullen was part of a blockbuster trade, as he and Andy Messersmith were sent to the Los Angeles Dodgers for Billy Grabarkewitz, Frank Robinson, Bill Singer, Mike Strahler and Bobby Valentine.

== Pinch hitter ==
McMullen played the 1973 season opener at third base, but was soon displaced by rookie Ron Cey. From there, he served mostly as a pinch hitter, going six-for-nineteen with a walk, two home runs and nine RBIs in that role. He spent two more seasons backing up Cey and pinch hitting in Los Angeles, clubbing a pinch hit grand slam against the San Diego Padres on April 24, 1975. He was released during Spring training 1976, but soon after caught on with the Oakland Athletics. He spent one season in Oakland, serving primarily as a designated hitter and pinch hitter.

He spent his final season with the Milwaukee Brewers before retiring. He hit a pinch hit home run against the Seattle Mariners in his final career at bat.

== Personal life ==
Prior to his 1973 season with the Dodgers, McMullen’s wife Bobbie (Goldie McMullen) was diagnosed with breast cancer. Three months pregnant at the time with the couple’s third child, she declined treatment that could have prematurely terminated her pregnancy. Her cancer treatment began after she gave birth to son Jonathan in November 1973. McMullen was able to continue with his baseball activities because of the insistence of his wife who died on April 6, 1974. They had four children, Ryan, Tamara, Kenna and Jon.

== Career ==
Games	PA	AB	Runs	Hits	2B	3B	HR	RBI	SB	BB	SO	Avg.	Slg.	OBP	Fld%
1583	5729	5131	568	1273	172	26	156	606	20	510	518	.248	.383	.316	.965

Robbed of the opportunity to play in the 1963 World Series by an injury, McMullen returned to the post-season in the twilight of his career with the Los Angeles Dodgers. In the 1974 National League Championship Series, he struck out against the Pittsburgh Pirates' Bruce Kison in his only post-season at-bat.
