= Bob Saverine =

American baseball player (born 1941)

- Infielder / Outfielder
- Born: June 2, 1941 (age 85); Norwalk, Connecticut, U.S.
- Batted: Switch Threw: Right

MLB debut
- September 12, 1959, for the Baltimore Orioles

Last MLB appearance
- October 1, 1967, for the Washington Senators

MLB statistics
- Batting average: .239
- Home runs: 6
- Runs batted in: 47
- Stats at Baseball Reference

Teams
- Baltimore Orioles (1959, 1962–1964); Washington Senators (1966–1967)

Robert Paul Saverine (born June 2, 1941) is an American former Major League Baseball (MLB) infielder and outfielder. He was signed by the Baltimore Orioles as an amateur free agent before the 1959 season and played for the Orioles (1959, 1962–1964) and the Washington Senators (1966–1967).

== Biography ==
Saverine was number one in his class at Darien High School and recruited by scouts for both professional baseball and basketball. His father Joseph Saverine is the only person in the Georgetown University's history to have captained both the baseball and football athletic teams in a single year.

Saverine made his Major League debut on September 12, 1959 against the Chicago White Sox at the Memorial Stadium. He entered the game as a pinch runner in the bottom of the eighth inning for Billy Klaus with the Orioles behind 6-0. He advanced to third on a single to right by Al Pilarcik, then scored on a Bob Nieman single to left. Baltimore lost the game 6-1 to Hall of Famer Early Wynn. At the age of 18, Saverine was the youngest player to appear in an American League game that season.

Saverine scored the only run in a rare battle of complete game one-hitters between Orioles left-hander Frank Bertaina and Kansas City Athletics southpaw Bob Meyer. On September 12, 1964, he entered the 0-0 game in the bottom of the 8th as a pinch runner for John Orsino, who had doubled. He moved to third on a Bertaina sacrifice bunt and then scored on a sacrifice fly by Jackie Brandt.

In 1966, he was put in the starting lineup 96 times by Senators manager Gil Hodges, usually as a second baseman. He also had career highs in games played (120), hits (102), at bats (406), batting average (.251), home runs (5), runs batted in (24), and runs scored (54).

Career totals for 379 games include a .239 batting average (206-for-861), 6 HR, 47 RBI, 114 runs scored, and an on-base percentage of .299. Besides second base, Saverine also played shortstop, third base, and all three outfield positions. He played all the positions well but was especially good at short, where he handled 146 out of 148 total chances for a fielding percentage of .986.
