= Cap Peterson =

American baseball player (1942–1980)

- Outfielder
- Born: August 15, 1942; Tacoma, Washington, U.S.
- Died: May 16, 1980 (aged 37); Tacoma, Washington, U.S.
- Batted: Right Threw: Right

MLB debut
- September 12, 1962, for the San Francisco Giants

Last MLB appearance
- September 28, 1969, for the Cleveland Indians

MLB statistics
- Batting average: .230
- Home runs: 19
- Runs batted in: 122
- Stats at Baseball Reference

Teams
- San Francisco Giants (1962–1966); Washington Senators (1967–1968); Cleveland Indians (1969)

Charles Andrew "Cap" Peterson (August 15, 1942 – May 16, 1980) was an American Major League Baseball player. He was known as "Cap" from the initials of his name.

An outfielder who appeared in eight MLB seasons, he played with the San Francisco Giants from 1962 to 1966, the Washington Senators from 1967 to 1968, and the Cleveland Indians in 1969. He split time between left field and right field over the course of his career. Peterson batted and threw right-handed, stood 6 feet 2 inches (1.88 m) and weighed 195 pounds (88 kg).

Peterson was born in Tacoma, Washington, and was a graduate of Clover Park High School,

Peterson first came to the Giants in September 1962 after a stalwart season with the El Paso Sun Kings of the Double-A Texas League, batting .335 with 29 home runs, 130 runs batted in and an OPS of 1.013. But he never won a regular job with San Francisco and was traded to the Senators in December 1966 in a multi-player transaction that sent future 1967 National League Cy Young Award winner Mike McCormick back to the Giants. Peterson appeared in a career-high 122 games for the 1967 Senators, but he batted only .240 with eight home runs and 46 RBI in 405 at bats. During the 1969 season with the Indians, Peterson was reunited with Alvin Dark, the former Giants manager, and he served as a reserve outfielder and pinch-hitter.

Overall, he appeared in 536 MLB games, and batted .230, with 269 hits in 1,170 at bats.

After his professional baseball playing days were finished, Peterson was president of his family's construction business. He died in Tacoma at age 37 after a long bout with kidney disease.
