= Mike Epstein =

American baseball player (born 1943)

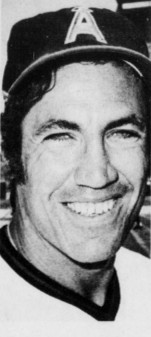
- First baseman
- Born: April 4, 1943 (age 83); The Bronx, New York, U.S.
- Batted: Left Threw: Left

MLB debut
- September 16, 1966, for the Baltimore Orioles

Last MLB appearance
- April 28, 1974, for the California Angels

MLB statistics
- Batting average: .244
- Home runs: 130
- Runs batted in: 380
- Stats at Baseball Reference

Teams
- Baltimore Orioles (1966–1967); Washington Senators (1967–1971); Oakland Athletics (1971–1972); Texas Rangers (1973); California Angels (1973–1974)

Career highlights and awards
- World Series champion (1972)

Michael Peter Epstein (born April 4, 1943), nicknamed "Super Jew", is an American former professional baseball player for the Baltimore Orioles, Washington Senators / Texas Rangers, Oakland Athletics, and California Angels of Major League Baseball (MLB).

== Early and personal life ==
Epstein was born in the Bronx, New York, and is Jewish. His parents were Jack (a salesman, born in Toronto, Ontario, Canada) and Evelyn (born in New York City). When he was three years old, his family moved to Hartsdale, New York, and then when he was 13 to the Fairfax District in Los Angeles, California. Epstein said of his father, who refused when Epstein was still a minor to sign a contract on his behalf with the Dodgers: "He wanted me to be a lawyer, rather than a bum."

== Amateur career ==
Epstein played for the baseball and football teams while attending Fairfax High School in Los Angeles, graduating in 1961. He was named to the baseball second team on the All-Western League Team two years in a row, by the Helms Athletic Foundation's All-Southern California Board of Athletics. He played quarterback and fullback on the football team.

Epstein attended the University of California-Berkeley on a football scholarship, playing as a running back in 1962, under future NFL Hall of Fame coach Marv Levy and alongside future NFL quarterback Craig Morton. He was recruited to Berkeley by future NFL Hall of Fame coach Bill Walsh. He majored in social psychology and eventually played college baseball for the California Golden Bears, graduating in 1964.

Although his .375 batting average in 1963 led to a contract offer by the Los Angeles Dodgers, he decided to finish college. The following year, he batted .384 as a senior and was named an All-American. His .381 career average is a school record. He represented the United States in baseball at the 1964 Summer Olympics as a demonstration sport in Tokyo.

In 2023, Epstein was inducted into the California Athletics Hall of Fame.

== Minor leagues ==
Epstein was signed by the Orioles as an amateur free agent in 1964, receiving a $20,000 signing bonus. Epstein played for the Stockton Ports of the California League in 1965, and led the league in batting average (.338) and home runs (30; tying a league record set by Vince DiMaggio). He was named the league's Most Valuable Player (MVP). Rival manager Rocky Bridges nicknamed him "Super Jew" for his efforts that season.

Epstein played for the Rochester Red Wings of the International League in 1966, batting .309 with 29 home runs and 102 runs batted in (RBIs), earning him league MVP and Rookie of the Year honors. He was also named an All Star and received The Sporting News Minor League Player of the Year Award and Topps Minor League Player of the Year Award.

== Major leagues ==
Epstein was first brought up for six games by the Baltimore Orioles in 1966, at the age of 23. After the Orioles tried in vain to convert him to the outfield (they already had Boog Powell at first base), they demoted him to Rochester again. The outspoken Epstein refused to report, going home to California and continuing his schooling instead. He was traded along with Frank Bertaina from the Orioles to the Washington Senators for Pete Richert on 29 May 1967, going from one of the best organizations in baseball to one of the worst. Later that season, in his first at-bat against the Orioles, Epstein hit a grand slam. In 1968 he was fourth in the league in getting hit by pitches HBP (9).

In 1969 with the Senators, in only 403 at bats Epstein hit 30 home runs (ninth in the American League), had 85 runs batted in (RBIs), and hit for a .278 batting average (and .347 with runners in scoring position) with an excellent .414 on-base percentage and .551 slugging percentage. He was fourth in the league in hit by pitch (10), and he hit a home run every 13.4 at bats. He was 25th in voting for the American League MVP. This was also the only year in which the reconstituted Senators (now the Texas Rangers) finished above .500.

In 1970, he was second in the league in being hit by a pitch (13), while hitting 20 home runs, and leading all AL first basemen in range factor (10.08). In 1969-70, he was managed by Hall of Fame hitting great Ted Williams. In 1969, Williams made a special effort to instruct Epstein on how to improve as a hitter, with a focus on teaching Epstein to only swing at strikes. That year, Epstein had career highs in batting average, home runs, bases on balls, runs batted in, runs scored, on-base percentage, and slugging percentage. In only 18 more at-bats in 1969 than 1968, he had 17 more home runs, 33 more runs and 52 more RBIs; and his batting average increased from .234 to .278. In 1970, however, Epstein's hitting declined as his average against left-handed pitching fell considerably.

In May 1971, he was traded along with Darold Knowles to the Oakland Athletics for Frank Fernandez, Don Mincher, Paul Lindblad, and cash. In 1971, while hitting 18 home runs in 329 at bats, he was hit by a pitch 12 times, leading the league. In 1972 he hit 26 home runs (3rd in the league) for the world champion Athletics. He hit a home run every 17.5 at bats (3rd in the AL), had a .490 slugging percentage (5th), had a .376 on-base percentage (6th), collected 62 walks (10th), and was hit by a pitch 11 times (2nd). He was 16th in voting for the American League MVP.

However, in late May, while on the road in Arlington Texas, Epstein and slugger Reggie Jackson came to blows in the clubhouse over Epstein's use of complimentary tickets for family members. The next day, owner Charlie Finley asked him about the incident. Finley claimed Epstein attacked his star player (Jackson). Epstein disputed that, claimed that Jackson was the problem, and demanded to be traded.

Going hitless in 16 at bats during the World Series that fall, in addition to his feud with manager Dick Williams over lack of playing time, resulted in the Athletics fulfilling his trade demand by sending him to the Texas Rangers for Horacio Piña on December 1, 1972. Additionally, the A's wanted to free up the first base position for Gene Tenace who was the star of that same Fall Classic.

Opening 1973 batting .188 with one homer and six RBIs, he was dealt along with Rich Hand and Rick Stelmaszek from the Rangers to the California Angels for Jim Spencer and Lloyd Allen on May 20. In 1973, he was seventh in the league in hit by pitches (8). On May 4, 1974, he was released by the Angels.

In 907 games over nine seasons, Epstein posted a .244 batting average (695-for-2,854) with 362 runs, 130 home runs, 380 RBIs, 448 bases on balls, .358 on-base percentage and .424 slugging percentage. He finished his career with a .991 fielding percentage playing every inning at first base. In 13 postseason games, he hit only .108 (4-for-37) with two runs scored, one home run, one RBI, and nine walks.

In 1991 he was inducted into the Southern California Jewish Sports Hall of Fame. He was inducted as a member of the United States National Jewish Sports Hall of Fame in 2004.

Through 2010, he was sixth all-time in career home runs (behind Mike Lieberthal) among Jewish major league baseball players.

== Coaching ==
In 1993, the Milwaukee Brewers named Epstein manager of the rookie league Helena Brewers, who played in the Pioneer League. He only managed 11 games, as his hitting philosophy learned under Ted Williams was contrary to the current trend at the time.

== After baseball ==
After his baseball playing days were over, Epstein ran a hitting school, teaching the techniques he learned from Ted Williams.

== See also ==
- List of Jewish Major League Baseball players
- List of University of California, Berkeley alumni
