= Dick Nold =

American baseball player (born 1943)

- Pitcher
- Born: May 4, 1943 (age 81); San Francisco
- Batted: Right Threw: Right

MLB debut
- August 19, 1967, for the Washington Senators

Last MLB appearance
- September 21, 1967, for the Washington Senators

MLB statistics
- Win–loss record: 0–2
- Earned run average: 4.87
- Strikeouts: 10
- Stats at Baseball Reference

Teams
- Washington Senators (1967)

Richard Louis Nold (born May 4, 1943) is a former Major League Baseball pitcher who played for one season. He pitched for the Washington Senators for seven games during the 1967 Washington Senators season.
