= Greg Shanahan =

American baseball player (born 1947)

- Pitcher
- Born: December 11, 1947 (age 78); Eureka, California, U.S.
- Batted: Right Threw: Right

MLB debut
- September 4, 1973, for the Los Angeles Dodgers

Last MLB appearance
- September 30, 1974, for the Los Angeles Dodgers

MLB statistics
- Win–loss record: 0–0
- Earned run average: 3.57
- Strikeouts: 12
- Stats at Baseball Reference

Teams
- Los Angeles Dodgers (1973–1974)

Paul Gregory Shanahan (born December 11, 1947) is an American former pitcher in Major League Baseball. He pitched in 11 games for the Los Angeles Dodgers during the 1973 and 1974 seasons. Shanahan never did pick up a victory in the major leagues but on the final day of the 1973 season, he did pick up his one and only MLB save. It came against the Padres and Shanahan pitched 4 very effective innings, allowing only 1 run on 2 hits and nailing down a 3-2 victory. He saved the game for starting pitcher Geoff Zahn and helped the Dodgers win their 95th game of the season.
