= Cecil Perkins =

American baseball player (1940–2021)

- Pitcher
- Born: December 1, 1940; Baltimore, Maryland, U.S.
- Died: October 28, 2021 (aged 80)
- Batted: Right Threw: Right

MLB debut
- July 5, 1967, for the New York Yankees

Last MLB appearance
- July 8, 1967, for the New York Yankees

MLB statistics
- Win–loss record: 0–1
- Earned run average: 9.00
- Strikeouts: 1
- Stats at Baseball Reference

Teams
- New York Yankees (1967)

Cecil Boyce Perkins (December 1, 1940 – October 28, 2021) was an American Major League Baseball pitcher who appeared in two games for the New York Yankees in 1967. He posted a 0–1 record with a 9.00 earned run average in five full innings pitched. His professional baseball career lasted seven years (1962–1968), all in the Yankee organization.

Perkins batted and threw right-handed, stood 6 feet (1.8 m) tall and weighed 175 pounds (79 kg). The Baltimore native attended Salem University and Shepherd University, both in West Virginia. He appeared in 116 games in the minor leagues, 102 as a starting pitcher. His MLB trial occurred in July 1967. In his debut, July 5 against the contending Minnesota Twins, he started against Jim Kaat, surrendered five hits and five earned runs in three innings, and was charged with the eventual 10–4 defeat. Three days later, against the Baltimore Orioles, he threw two scoreless innings of relief to lower his career ERA to 9.00. He surrendered six total hits (including a home run to Rich Reese) and two bases on balls in the majors, with one strikeout.
