= Orlando Álvarez =

Puerto Rican baseball player (1952–2016)

- Outfielder
- Born: February 28, 1952; Río Grande, Puerto Rico
- Died: March 31, 2016 (aged 64); Río Grande, Puerto Rico
- Batted: Right Threw: Right

MLB debut
- September 1, 1973, for the Los Angeles Dodgers

Last MLB appearance
- June 18, 1976, for the California Angels

MLB statistics
- Batting average: .157
- Home runs: 2
- Runs batted in: 8
- Stats at Baseball Reference

Teams
- Los Angeles Dodgers (1973–1975); California Angels (1976)

Jesús Manuel Orlando Álvarez Monge (February 28, 1952 – March 31, 2016) was a Puerto Rican professional baseball player. An outfielder who threw and batted right-handed, he appeared in 25 games in Major League Baseball over portions of four seasons (1973–1976) for the Los Angeles Dodgers and California Angels. Álvarez was born in the municipality of Río Grande. During his playing career he was listed as 6 feet (1.8 m) tall and 165 pounds (75 kg).

Álvarez signed as a free agent with the Dodgers in May 1969, and had a 12-season career in minor league baseball, during which he batted over .300 three times. In 1973, he led the Double-A Eastern League in hits (139) and was selected to the All-Star team. He had three consecutive past-September-1 trials with the Dodgers from 1973 through 1975, garnering only one hit in nine at bats and ten games played. Traded to the Angels on March 31, 1976, he had his most extended stay in MLB that season; appearing in 15 games during May and June, he collected six hits, including his only two big-league home runs, and was credited with eight runs batted in.

His professional career ended in the Triple-A Mexican League in 1984. Orlando Álvarez died from complications of diabetes in his native Río Grande at the age of 64. He was buried at the Río Grande Municipal Cemetery in Río Grande, Puerto Rico.

== Transactions ==
- Before 1970 season– Signed as a free agent with the Los Angeles Dodgers.
- March 31, 1976– Traded to the California Angels in exchange for Ellie Rodríguez and cash.

== See also ==
- List of Major League Baseball players from Puerto Rico
