= Bill Dillman =

American baseball player (born 1945)

- Pitcher
- Born: May 25, 1945 (age 81); Trenton, New Jersey, U.S.
- Batted: Right Threw: Right

MLB debut
- April 14, 1967, for the Baltimore Orioles

Last MLB appearance
- July 18, 1970, for the Montreal Expos

MLB statistics
- Win–loss record: 7–12
- Strikeouts: 86
- Earned run average: 4.54
- Stats at Baseball Reference

Teams
- Baltimore Orioles (1967); Montreal Expos (1970)

William Howard Dillman (born May 25, 1945) is an American former professional baseball player. A right-handed pitcher, he appeared in 50 Major League games over two seasons for the 1967 Baltimore Orioles and the 1970 Montreal Expos. He attended Wake Forest University, stood 6 feet 2 inches (1.88 m) tall and weighed 180 pounds (82 kg).

Taken by the Orioles in the 6th round of the 1965 amateur draft, Dillman made his Major League debut for the Orioles in 1967. He pitched five innings of no-hit baseball in relief of starting pitcher Tom Phoebus. He struck out veteran Phil Roof and held off all-star Bert Campaneris to win the game in his first appearance.

Dillman finished 16 games in his career and amassed 3 saves.
