= Frank Bertaina =

American baseball player (1944–2010)

- Pitcher
- Born: April 14, 1944; San Francisco, California, U.S.
- Died: March 3, 2010 (aged 65); Santa Rosa, California, U.S.
- Batted: Left Threw: Left

MLB debut
- August 1, 1964, for the Baltimore Orioles

Last MLB appearance
- September 25, 1970, for the St. Louis Cardinals

MLB statistics
- Win–loss record: 19–29
- Earned run average: 3.84
- Strikeouts: 280
- Stats at Baseball Reference

Teams
- Baltimore Orioles (1964–1967); Washington Senators (1967–1969); Baltimore Orioles (1969); St. Louis Cardinals (1970)

Career highlights and awards
- World Series champion (1966)

Frank Louis Bertaina (April 14, 1944 – March 3, 2010) was an American pitcher in Major League Baseball who played from 1964 through 1970 for the Baltimore Orioles (1964–67, 1969), Washington Senators (1967–69), and St. Louis Cardinals (1970). Listed at 5 feet 11 inches (1.80 m) tall and 177 pounds (80 kg), Bertaina batted and threw left-handed.

== Early life ==
Bertaina was born on April 14, 1944, in San Francisco. He attended Sacred Heart Catholic Preparatory School, which won baseball championships in 1960 and 1961. As a junior (1960) he was Player of the Year, and as a senior (1961) he led the team with league records in pitching with a 10–0 win–loss record, and an 0.27 earned run average (ERA). He also led the team in hitting, with a .451 batting average. During his high school career he had an 18-strikeout game and a no-hitter. He has been inducted into Sacred Heart's Athletic Hall of Fame, as have the 1960 and 1961 teams he led to championships.

== Professional baseball career ==
=== Minor league ===
Many professional teams pursued Bertaina. Jim Gentile, a Sacred Heart alumni (and hall of fame member), played first base for the Baltimore Orioles and recommended that Bertaina sign with the Orioles, which he did. In 1962, the Orioles assigned Bertaina to the Aberdeen Pheasants of the Class-C Northern League, where he had a 13–10 record and 3.40 ERA. He played in the Orioles minor league system for all or parts of the following four years (1963-1966). In 1964, playing for the Double-A Elmira Pioneers, Bertaina had an 11–4 record and 1.99 ERA.

His manager that season was Earl Weaver, who would go on to become a Hall of Fame manager for the Orioles. Weaver helped Bertaina improve his pitching knowledge and ability. Bertaina also played for Weaver at Triple-A Rochester in 1966, where he had 9–2 record and 2.33 ERA. He would return to minor league play at the end of his career.

=== Major league ===
Bertaina made his major league debut on August 1, 1964, against the Kansas City Athletics at Municipal Stadium in Kansas City. Earlier that year, he had done a good job pitching in an Orioles exhibition game against the Philadelphia Phillies. In Kansas City, he started and gave up two earned runs in seven innings pitched, but did not receive a decision in the 5–2 Orioles victory. On September 12, he one-hit the Kansas City Athletics, winning 1-0, while opposing losing pitcher Bob Meyer allowed the Orioles just one hit as well. This was the fourth double one-hitter pitched in the modern era (since 1901) in MLB history and to date, the most recent.

He pitched in a total of six games for the Orioles in 1964, and only two games for them in 1965. In 1966, the year the Orioles won the World Series, Bertaina pitched in 16 games, with a 2–5 record and 3.13 ERA. He did not pitch in the World Series.

He started two of five games and was 1–1 with a 3.32 ERA before being traded along with Mike Epstein from the Orioles to the Washington Senators for Pete Richert on 29 May 1967. Bertaina started 17 games for the Senators, finishing with a 6–5 record and 2.92 ERA for Washington. With both Baltimore and Washington in 1967, he went 7–6 with a 2.99 ERA and a career-high 86 strikeouts, while tying for ninth in the American League with four shutouts.

He pitched a full season for the Senators in 1968, with a 7–13 record and 4.66 ERA, and 23 starts. In 1969, he was pitching less for the Senators, mostly as a relief pitcher, when he was traded back to the Orioles on June 16, 1969 for Paul Campbell. The 1969 Orioles had superb starting and relief pitching, and Bertaina only pitched 6 innings for the team. He played the majority of his games that year with Rochester. In 1970, he was 12–3 with Rochester when the Orioles sold his rights to the St. Louis Cardinals on August 14, 1970. He pitched the final 8 games of his major league career for the Cardinals. He played one more season of minor league baseball for the Tulsa Oilers in 1971 before retiring altogether.

=== Career ===
In a seven-year major league career, Bertaina posted a 19–29 record with 3.84 ERA in 100 pitching appearances, including 66 starts, five shutouts, six complete games and 10 games finished, giving up 208 runs (176 earned) on 399 hits, while striking out 280 and walking 214 in 413 innings of work.

During his minor league career, Bertaina led the Eastern League in winning percentage (.733) in 1964 while pitching for the Elmira Pioneers, topped the International League in strikeouts (188) with the Rochester Red Wings in 1965, and won the International League winning percentage title (.800) with the 1970 Red Wings. He was inducted into the Red Wings Hall of Fame in 2005.

== Personal life ==
Bertaina co-founded Fishing International, one of the first travel agencies in the world dedicated to those who enjoyed fishing. He also co-owned and operated Lava Creek Lodge in Fall River Mills, California for many years.

== Death ==
Bertaina died at age 65 in Santa Rosa, California on 3 March 2010 following complications from a heart attack.
