= Paul Gilliford =

American baseball player (born 1945)

- Pitcher
- Born: January 12, 1945 (age 81); Bryn Mawr, Pennsylvania, U.S.
- Batted: Right Threw: Left

MLB debut
- September 20, 1967, for the Baltimore Orioles

Last MLB appearance
- September 24, 1967, for the Baltimore Orioles

MLB statistics
- Win–loss record: 0–0
- Earned run average: 12.00
- Innings: 3
- Stats at Baseball Reference

Teams
- Baltimore Orioles (1967)

Paul Gant Gilliford (born January 12, 1945) is a retired American professional baseball player, a left-handed pitcher who appeared in two Major League games for the 1967 Baltimore Orioles during the course of a five-year (1965–1969) career. He was listed at 5 feet 11 inches (1.80 m) tall and 210 pounds (95 kg).

In Gilliford's second pro season, 1966, he led the Class A Florida State League in earned run average (1.27) and posted a 16–3 won–lost record. On June 14 of that season, he pitched 11 scoreless innings during a 29-inning game between the Miami Marlins and the St. Petersburg Cardinals, the longest uninterrupted game, by innings, in professional baseball history. After splitting the 1967 minor league season between the Class A California League and the Double-A Eastern League, Gilliford was called up by the MLB Orioles for a late-season trial. He pitched two scoreless innings against the Washington Senators in his debut, but in his second appearance, also in relief four days later, the Boston Red Sox reached him for five hits, including a home run by George Scott, and four earned runs. In three Major League innings pitched, Gilliford gave up six hits and one base on balls, with two strikeouts.

He returned to the minor leagues in 1968–1969 before leaving the game.
