= Frank Howard (baseball) =

American baseball player, coach, and manager (1936–2023)

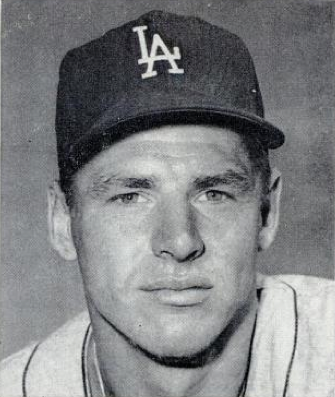
- Howard with the Los Angeles Dodgers in 1962
- Outfielder / First baseman
- Born: August 8, 1936; Columbus, Ohio, U.S.
- Died: October 30, 2023 (aged 87); Aldie, Virginia, U.S.
- Batted: Right Threw: Right

Professional debut
- MLB: September 10, 1958, for the Los Angeles Dodgers
- NPB: April 6, 1974, for the Taiheiyo Club Lions

Last appearance
- MLB: September 30, 1973, for the Detroit Tigers
- NPB: April 6, 1974, for the Taiheiyo Club Lions

MLB statistics
- Batting average: .273
- Home runs: 382
- Runs batted in: 1,119
- Stats at Baseball Reference
- Managerial record at Baseball Reference

Teams
- As player: Los Angeles Dodgers (1958–1964); Washington Senators / Texas Rangers (1965–1972); Detroit Tigers (1972–1973); Taiheiyo Club Lions (1974); As manager: San Diego Padres (1981); New York Mets (1983); As coach: Milwaukee Brewers (1977–1980); New York Mets (1982–1984); Milwaukee Brewers (1985–1986); Seattle Mariners (1987–1988); New York Yankees (1989, 1991–1993); New York Mets (1994–1996); Tampa Bay Devil Rays (1998–1999)

Career highlights and awards
- 4× All-Star (1968–1971); World Series champion (1963); NL Rookie of the Year (1960); 2× AL home run leader (1968, 1970); AL RBI leader (1970); Washington Nationals Ring of Honor

Frank Oliver Howard (August 8, 1936 – October 30, 2023), nicknamed "Hondo", "the Washington Monument" and "the Capital Punisher", was an American professional baseball player, coach, and manager in Major League Baseball (MLB) who played most of his career for the Los Angeles Dodgers and Washington Senators/Texas Rangers franchises. One of the most physically intimidating players in the sport, Howard was 6 feet 7 inches (2.01 m) tall and weighed between 275 and 295 pounds (125 and 134 kg), according to former Senators/Rangers trainer Bill Zeigler.

Howard was named the National League's Rookie of the Year in 1960 for the Dodgers. He twice led the American League in home runs, and total bases and once each in slugging percentage, runs batted in, and walks. Howard was a four-time MLB All-Star. He hit 382 career home runs and was inducted into the Washington Nationals Ring of Honor after his retirement.

== Early life ==
Frank Oliver Howard was born on August 8, 1936, in Columbus, Ohio, to John and Erma Howard, the third of six children. His father was a machinist for the Chesapeake and Ohio Railway and had played semi-professional baseball, later on encouraging his son's interest in the game.

Howard attended South High School in Columbus, Ohio, and Ohio State University, where he played college baseball and college basketball for the Ohio State Buckeyes. He was an All-American in both basketball and baseball. In basketball, he averaged 20.1 points and 15.3 rebounds per game in 1957, and was drafted the following year by the Philadelphia Warriors of the National Basketball Association.

== Professional career ==
=== Los Angeles Dodgers ===
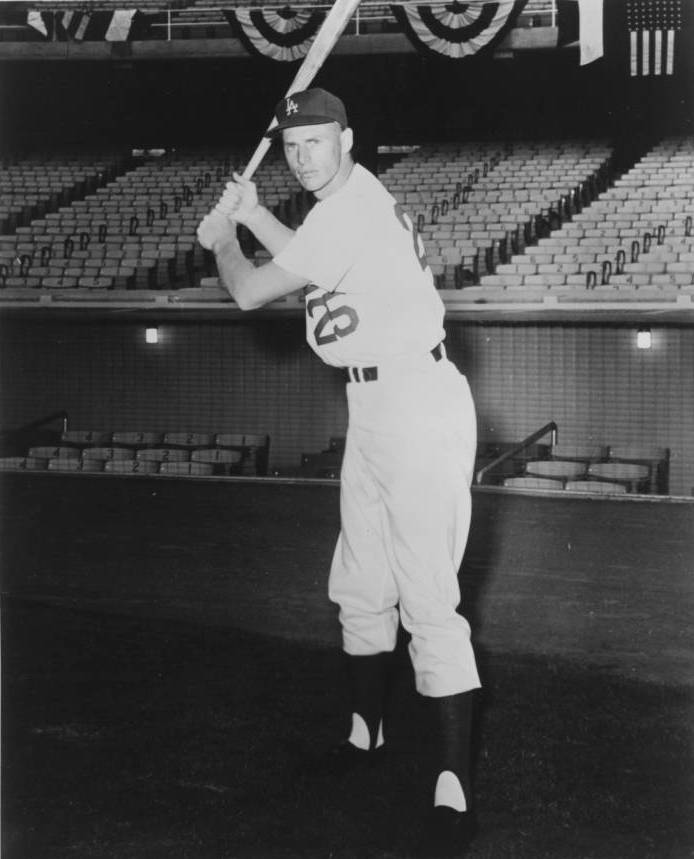
Howard in 1960

Howard instead signed with the Los Angeles Dodgers organization in 1958 for a $108,000 signing bonus (equivalent to $1,210,000 in 2025). Howard spent the 1958 season with the Green Bay Bluejays of the Class B Illinois–Indiana–Iowa League. He led the league with 37 home runs and 119 runs batted in (RBIs). The Dodgers briefly promoted him to the major leagues after his minor league season, and he hit his first MLB home run on his 29th at bat. He then began the 1959 season with the Victoria Rosebuds of the Double-A Texas League, where he hit .356 with 27 home runs and 79 RBIs in 261 at-bats before the Dodgers again promoted Howard to the major leagues. He batted .105 in 19 at bats for the Dodgers before they demoted him to the Spokane Indians of the Triple-A Pacific Coast League on July 1. In 76 games for Spokane, Howard had a .319 average, 16 home runs, and 47 RBIs across 295 at bats. He won The Sporting News Minor League Player of the Year Award.

Howard began the 1960 season in Spokane, and was promoted to the Dodgers after batting .371 in 26 games. He succeeded former Brooklyn Dodger All-Star Carl Furillo as Los Angeles' right fielder in 1960. He was named the NL's Rookie of the Year after batting .268 with 23 home runs and 77 RBIs. His teammates gave him the nickname "Hondo" after the character in a John Wayne film. He missed the beginning of the 1961 season due to a chipped bone in the thumb on his right hand. He became a platoon outfielder, starting 72 games and batting .296 with 15 home runs.

In 1962, Howard batted .296 with 31 home runs and finished among the NL's top five players in RBIs (119) and slugging (.560). He won the NL Player of the Month award in July with a .381 average, 12 home runs, and 41 RBIs. The season ended with the Dodgers and San Francisco Giants tied for first place. In the three-game pennant playoff that followed, Howard had only a single in 11 at-bats, and struck out three times against Billy Pierce in the first game, including the final out. However he had a run and an RBI in the second contest, an 8–7 win. The Giants took the pennant in three games, but Howard ended up ninth in the MLB Most Valuable Player award voting.

In 1963, Howard's production dropped off to a .273 average, 28 homers, and 64 RBIs, but the Dodgers won the pennant, and his upper-deck solo home run off Whitey Ford broke a scoreless tie in the fifth inning of Game 4 of the World Series, helping Los Angeles to a 2–1 win and a sweep of the New York Yankees. He batted .226 with 24 home runs in 1964.

=== Washington Senators ===
1965 photo of Howard for Washington Senators

On December 4, 1964, the Dodgers traded Howard, Phil Ortega, Pete Richert, and Dick Nen to the Washington Senators for Claude Osteen, John Kennedy, and cash. Howard went from a fourth outfielder with Los Angeles to an every-day player with the Senators. In 1965, his first season in Washington, he batted .289 with 21 home runs in 143 games. In 1967, Howard hit 36 home runs, third in the AL behind Harmon Killebrew and Carl Yastrzemski. During a one-week stretch from May 12–18, 1968, Howard hit 10 home runs in 20 at bats. He also hit 13 home runs in 16 games. Howard finished the season leading the AL (and the majors) with 44 home runs, a .552 slugging percentage and 330 total bases, and was second to Ken Harrelson with 106 RBIs; he made his first of four consecutive All-Star teams that year. Beginning in 1968, Howard appeared semi-regularly at first base in order to limit the wear and tear of playing the outfield daily. With the Senators, Howard received the nickname "the Capitol Punisher".

Ted Williams became manager of the Senators in 1969 and helped Howard to become a more patient hitter. He encouraged Howard to lay off the first fastball he saw, and work pitchers deeper into the count, advice which resulted in Howard's walk totals nearly doubling and 45 fewer strikeouts the first year. A year later, Howard added 32 more walks to lead the AL with 132.

In 1969, Howard hit 48 home runs (one behind Killebrew's league lead) and had 111 runs (second in the AL to Reggie Jackson), a .296 batting average, and a .574 slugging mark. The Senators had their best year ever, 86–76, but still finished far behind the Baltimore Orioles in the Eastern Division. He again led the AL with 340 total bases, the most ever by a Washington player, and added 111 RBIs; his fourth-place finish in the MVP vote was the highest of his career. In 1970, he led the AL both in home runs (44) and RBIs (126); his 132 walks in that year also topped the league. On September 2, he received three intentional walks from flamethrowing southpaw Sam McDowell—two of them to lead off an inning. McDowell moved to play second base when Howard came up to bat in the eighth inning. He came in fifth in the 1970 MVP race, and received one first-place vote.

Howard hit the last regular-season home run for the Senators in RFK Stadium in his final at bat on September 30, 1971, off Yankees pitcher Mike Kekich. After waving to the cheering fans, Howard tossed his hat into the stands, and blew a kiss to the crowd.

After the game he said, "What can a guy do to top this? A guy like me has maybe five big thrills in his lifetime. Well, this was my biggest tonight. I'll take it to the grave with me. This was Utopia. I can't do anything else like it. It's all downhill the rest of the way."

=== Later career ===
The Senators moved to Dallas/Fort Worth in 1972, becoming the Texas Rangers. Howard hit the first ever home run for the Rangers, but batted only .244 with nine home runs in 95 games before his contract was sold to the Detroit Tigers in August for the $20,000 waiver price. He platooned with Norm Cash at first base and batted .242. He was not eligible for the Tigers' 1972 postseason roster as he reported to the Tigers after the September 1 deadline. As the Tigers' designated hitter in 1973, Howard batted .256 with 12 home runs and 29 RBIs. The Tigers released Howard after the season.

Unable to find a job in the majors in 1974, Howard signed to play in Japan's Pacific League for the Taiheiyo Club Lions. In his first at bat there he hurt his back on a swing, and never played again.

In 16 major league seasons, Howard batted .273 with 382 home runs.

=== As manager and coach ===
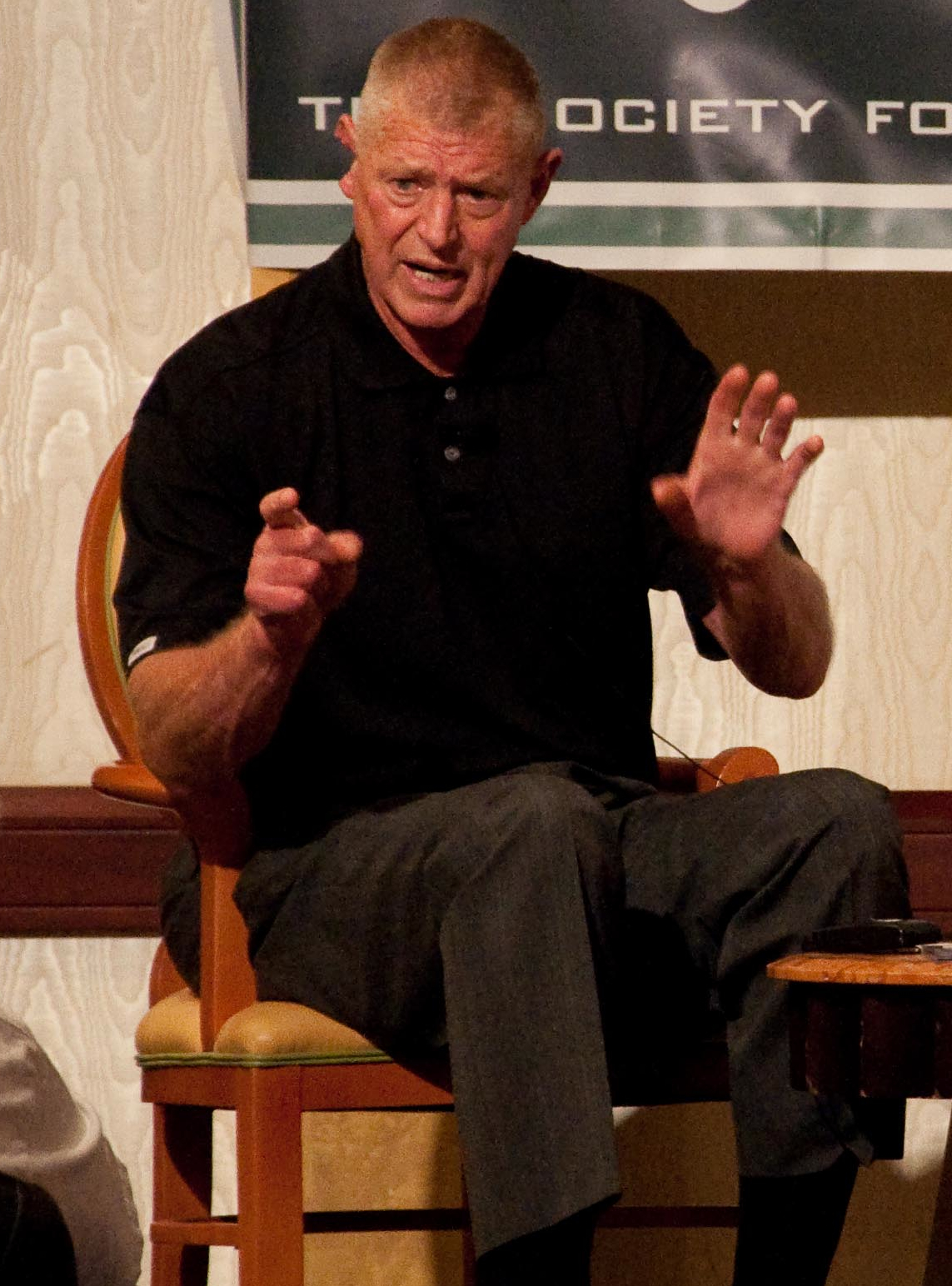
Howard in 2009

Following his retirement as a player, the Milwaukee Brewers hired Howard to manage Spokane for the 1976 season.

Howard was the hitting coach and then the first base coach for the Brewers from 1977 to 1980 for managers Alex Grammas and George Bamberger before being named manager of the San Diego Padres prior to the 1981 season. The Padres finished in last place in both halves of that strike-shortened season, and Howard was fired. Their 41–69 overall record was MLB's worst that season, with their .373 winning percentage the lowest in the Padres' history since they were 52–110 (.321) in their inaugural season in 1969.

Howard became the first base coach with the New York Mets in 1982, where Bamberger was the manager, and took over as manager after Bamberger's resignation in June 1983. Howard managed the last 116 games of the 1983 season. The Mets finished in last place and the Mets did not retain Howard as manager. Instead, he returned as the first base coach the following season.

Howard rejoined Bamberger with the Brewers as their hitting and first base coach in 1985 and was fired after the 1986 season. He became a first base coach for the Seattle Mariners in 1987. Howard was the hitting and first base coach for the New York Yankees from 1989 to 1993, the first base coach for the Mets from 1994 to 1996, and the bench coach for the Tampa Bay Devil Rays from 1998 to 1999. From 2000 to 2008, he worked for the Yankees as a player development instructor.

The Washington Nationals inducted Howard in their Ring of Honor in August 2016.

== Personal life ==
Howard was often described as an especially nice person, “hard-as-nails physically but as soft as he could be as a person and friend.”

Howard was married twice. His first marriage was to Carol Johanski, a secretary who worked at the Green Bay Press-Gazette. The couple met and married in 1958 and settled in Green Bay, Wisconsin, going on to raise six children before divorcing. In 1991, Howard married his second wife, Donna.

Howard died on October 30, 2023, at a hospital in Aldie, Virginia, of complications from a stroke. He was 87. His body is interred at Allouez Catholic Cemetery in Green Bay, Wisconsin.

== See also ==
- List of Major League Baseball career home run leaders
- List of Major League Baseball career runs batted in leaders
- List of Major League Baseball annual home run leaders
- List of Major League Baseball annual runs batted in leaders
- 1957 NCAA Men's Basketball All-Americans

Awards and achievements
Preceded by Sandy Koufax	Major League Player of the Month; July 1962	Succeeded by Jack Sanford
