= Tony Pierce (baseball) =

American baseball player

- Pitcher
- Born: January 29, 1946; Brunswick, Georgia, U.S.
- Died: January 31, 2013 (aged 67); Columbus, Georgia, U.S.
- Batted: Right Threw: Left

MLB debut
- April 14, 1967, for the Kansas City Athletics

Last MLB appearance
- June 21, 1968, for the Oakland Athletics

MLB statistics
- Win–loss record: 4–6
- Earned run average: 3.25
- Strikeouts: 77
- Stats at Baseball Reference

Teams
- Kansas City/Oakland Athletics (1967–1968)

Tony Michael Pierce (January 29, 1946 – January 31, 2013) was an American Major League Baseball pitcher. He played for the Kansas City/Oakland Athletics in 1967–1968. A left-hander, he stood 6 feet 1 inch (1.85 m) tall and weighed 190 pounds (86 kg). In two Major League seasons, he appeared in 66 games played, nine as a starting pitcher, and 130⅓ innings pitched, allowing 118 hits and 40 bases on balls, with 77 strikeouts.
