= Dick Nen =

American baseball player (born 1939)

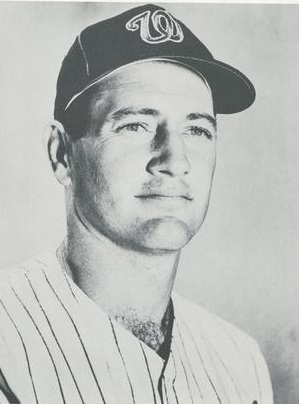
- Nen with the Washington Senators
- First baseman
- Born: September 24, 1939 (age 86); South Gate, California, U.S.
- Batted: Left Threw: Left

MLB debut
- September 18, 1963, for the Los Angeles Dodgers

Last MLB appearance
- June 28, 1970, for the Washington Senators

MLB statistics
- Batting average: .224
- Home runs: 21
- Runs batted in: 107
- Stats at Baseball Reference

Teams
- Los Angeles Dodgers (1963); Washington Senators (1965–1967); Chicago Cubs (1968); Washington Senators (1970)

Richard Leroy Nen (born September 24, 1939) is an American former professional baseball player. A first baseman, Nen appeared in 367 games in Major League Baseball (MLB) for the Los Angeles Dodgers (1963), Washington Senators (1965–1967, 1970) and Chicago Cubs (1968). He threw and batted left-handed, stood 6 feet 2 inches (1.88 m) tall and weighed 200 pounds (91 kg). He is the father of former major league relief pitcher Robb Nen.

== Career ==
Nen was born in South Gate, California, graduated from Phineas Banning High School, and attended Los Angeles Harbor College and California State University, Long Beach. The Dodgers signed him in 1961, and Nen's first season in the Class C California League was highly productive, with a league-leading 32 home runs and 144 runs batted in, along with a .351 batting average. After two years with Triple-A Spokane, the first-place Dodgers recalled him in September 1963 during the height of the National League pennant race.

In his major league debut September 18, 1963, he was inserted into the lineup as a pinch hitter in the top of the seventh inning against the second-place St. Louis Cardinals at Busch Stadium and lined out to centerfield off Bob Gibson, the future Hall of Famer. Remaining in the game as the first baseman, Nen batted again in the ninth with the Dodgers trailing 5–4. Facing right-handed relief pitcher Ron Taylor, Nen hit a game-tying home run "over the roof" in right field to send the game into extra innings. The Dodgers won in the 13th frame to sweep the Cardinals in the three-game series, increasing their league lead to four games. They won the 1963 pennant by six lengths and swept the New York Yankees in the 1963 World Series.

The home run against the Cardinals was Nen's only hit as a Dodger; he batted .125 for them in 1963 and returned to Spokane for all of 1964. Traded to Washington that December in a blockbuster deal headlined by Frank Howard and Claude Osteen, Nen spent the bulk of his MLB service time with the Senators, getting into 279 games and hitting 18 of his 21 big-league home runs with them. His Washington tenure was interrupted in 1968 by a season as reserve first baseman for the Chicago Cubs. All told, Nen collected 185 big-league hits, with 23 doubles and three triples accompanying his 21 homers. Ineligible for the 1963 World Series, he never appeared in a postseason game. He retired after the 1972 minor league season.
