= Ray Barker (baseball) =

American baseball player (1936–2018)

Buddy Barker
- First baseman
- Born: March 12, 1936; Martinsburg, West Virginia, U.S.
- Died: May 29, 2018 (aged 82); Martinsburg, West Virginia, U.S.
- Batted: Left Threw: Right

MLB debut
- September 13, 1960, for the Baltimore Orioles

Last MLB appearance
- May 21, 1967, for the New York Yankees

MLB statistics
- Batting average: .214
- Home runs: 10
- Runs batted in: 44
- Stats at Baseball Reference

Teams
- Baltimore Orioles (1960); Cleveland Indians (1965); New York Yankees (1965–1967)

Raymond Herrell "Buddy" Barker (March 12, 1936 – May 29, 2018) was an American Major League Baseball first baseman who played in all or parts of four seasons for the Baltimore Orioles in 1960, the Cleveland Indians in 1965, and the New York Yankees from 1965 to 1967. Barker stood 6 feet (1.8 m) tall, weighed 192 pounds (87 kg), batted left-handed and threw right-handed as an active player.

Although Barker only played 192 games at the Major League level, with 68 hits in 318 at bats, he was an accomplished Triple-A player during his minor-league career, appearing for the Vancouver Mounties, Jacksonville Suns, Rochester Red Wings, Portland Beavers and Syracuse Chiefs and never failing to reach double digits in home runs. He retired after the 1967 campaign.

Barker died on May 29, 2018, at the age of 82.
