= 1967 Major League Baseball draft =

Baseball draft of amateur players

Overview
- First selection: Ron Blomberg; New York Yankees
- First round selections: 20
- Hall of Famers: 1: C Ted Simmons

The 1967 Major League Baseball draft recruits amateur baseball players into the American Major League Baseball (MLB) league. The players selected in 1967 included many talented prospects who later had careers in the professional league. Some selections included Bobby Grich and Don Baylor (Baltimore), Vida Blue (Kansas City Athletics), Dusty Baker and Ralph Garr (Atlanta), Ken Singleton and Jon Matlack (Mets), and Ted Simmons and Jerry Reuss (St. Louis). In the January draft, Boston selected catcher Carlton Fisk and the New York Mets drafted Ken Singleton. The Cincinnati Reds selected Chris Chambliss in the 31st round only to have him enroll in junior college. The Mets chose Dan Pastorini in the 32nd round, but Pastorini chose football and played several seasons in the NFL. Atlanta also chose Archie Manning in the 43rd round. There was also a "1967 MLB June Draft-Secondary Phase" that saw players drafted, most notably with Gary Gentry.

== First round selections ==
= All-Star	= Baseball Hall of Famer

The following are the first round picks in the 1967 Major League Baseball draft.

Pick	Player	Team	Position	Hometown/School
1	Ron Blomberg	New York Yankees	First baseman	Atlanta
2	Terry Hughes	Chicago Cubs	Shortstop	Spartanburg, South Carolina
3	Mike Garman	Boston Red Sox	Right-handed Pitcher	Caldwell, Idaho
4	Jon Matlack	New York Mets	Left-handed Pitcher	West Chester, Pennsylvania
5	John Jones	Washington Senators	Catcher	St. Joseph, Tennessee
6	John Mayberry	Houston Astros	First baseman	Detroit, Michigan
7	Brian Bickerton	Kansas City Athletics	Left-handed Pitcher	Santee, California
8	Wayne Simpson	Cincinnati Reds	Right-handed Pitcher	Los Angeles
9	Mike Nunn	California Angels	Catcher	Greensboro, North Carolina
10	Ted Simmons	St. Louis Cardinals	Catcher	Southfield, Michigan
11	Jack Heidemann	Cleveland Indians	Shortstop	Brenham, Texas
12	Andrew Finlay	Atlanta Braves	Outfielder	Sacramento, California
13	Dan Haynes	Chicago White Sox	Third baseman	East Point, Georgia
14	Phil Meyer	Philadelphia Phillies	Left-handed Pitcher	Downey, California
15	Jim Foor	Detroit Tigers	Left-handed Pitcher	Ferguson, Missouri
16	Joe Grigas	Pittsburgh Pirates	Outfielder	Brockton, Massachusetts
17	Steve Brye	Minnesota Twins	Third baseman/Outfielder	Oakland, California
18	Dave Rader	San Francisco Giants	Catcher	Bakersfield, California
19	Bobby Grich	Baltimore Orioles	Shortstop	Long Beach, California
20	Don Denbow	Los Angeles Dodgers	Third baseman	Southern Methodist University

== Other notable selections ==
= All-Star

Round	Pick	Player	Team	Position
2	27	Vida Blue	Kansas City Athletics	Pitcher
2	29	Dave Kingman*	California Angels	Pitcher
2	30	Jerry Reuss	St. Louis Cardinals	Pitcher
2	39	Don Baylor	Baltimore Orioles	Outfielder
3	52	Ralph Garr	Atlanta Braves	Second Baseman
3	56	Richie Zisk	Pittsburgh Pirates	Outfielder
4	68	Fred Kendall	Cincinnati Reds	Catcher
4	78	Steve Busby*	San Francisco Giants	Pitcher
4	80	Steve Yeager	Los Angeles Dodgers	Catcher
5	96	Dave Goltz	Minnesota Twins	Pitcher
8	157	Dave Lopes*	San Francisco Giants	Outfielder
10	189	Lenny Randle*	St. Louis Cardinals	Shortstop
11	216	Al Hrabosky*	Minnesota Twins	Pitcher
15	296	Rick Dempsey	Minnesota Twins	Catcher
20	396	Gary Lavelle	San Francisco Giants	Pitcher
20	397	Doug Rau*	Baltimore Orioles	Pitcher
26	503	Dusty Baker	Atlanta Braves	Outfielder
31	587	Chris Chambliss*	Cincinnati Reds	First Baseman
32	599	Dan Pastorini*	New York Mets	Shortstop
43	779	Archie Manning*	Atlanta Braves	Shortstop
60	924	Steve Rogers*	New York Yankees	Pitcher
69	962	Freddie Steinmark*	Cincinnati Reds	Shortstop

* Did not sign

== Notes ==
Preceded by Steve Chilcott	1st Overall Picks; Ron Blomberg	Succeeded by Tim Foli
