= 1969 Detroit Tigers season =

Major League Baseball season

1969 Detroit Tigers
- League: American League
- Division: East
- Ballpark: Tiger Stadium
- City: Detroit, Michigan
- Owners: John Fetzer
- General managers: Jim Campbell
- Managers: Mayo Smith
- Television: WJBK (George Kell, Larry Osterman)
- Radio: WJR (Ernie Harwell, Ray Lane)

The 1969 Detroit Tigers season was the team's 69th season and the 58th season at Tiger Stadium. The team finished a distant second in the newly established American League East with a record of 90–72, 19 games behind the Baltimore Orioles.

== Offseason ==
- October 15, 1968: Dick Drago was drafted from the Tigers by the Kansas City Royals as the 31st pick in the 1968 Major League Baseball expansion draft.
- December 15, 1968: Dennis Ribant was purchased from the Tigers by the Kansas City Royals.
- February 1, 1969: John Young was drafted by the Tigers in the 1st round (16th pick) of the 1969 Major League Baseball draft (secondary phase).

== Regular season ==
=== Season standings ===
AL East
Team	W	L	Pct.	GB	Home	Road
Baltimore Orioles	109	53	.673	—	60‍–‍21	49‍–‍32
Detroit Tigers	90	72	.556	19	46‍–‍35	44‍–‍37
Boston Red Sox	87	75	.537	22	46‍–‍35	41‍–‍40
Washington Senators	86	76	.531	23	47‍–‍34	39‍–‍42
New York Yankees	80	81	.497	28½	48‍–‍32	32‍–‍49
Cleveland Indians	62	99	.385	46½	33‍–‍48	29‍–‍51

=== Record vs. opponents ===
1969 American League records Sources:
Team	BAL	BOS	CAL	CWS	CLE	DET	KC	MIN	NYY	OAK	SEA	WAS
Baltimore	—	10–8	6–6	9–3	13–5	11–7	11–1	8–4	11–7	8–4	9–3	13–5
Boston	8–10	—	8–4	5–7	12–6	10–8	10–2	7–5	11–7	4–8	6–6	6–12
California	6–6	4–8	—	9–9	8–4	5–7	9–9	7–11	3–9	6–12	9–9–1	5–7
Chicago	3–9	7–5	9–9	—	8–4	3–9	8–10	5–13	3–9	8–10	10–8	4–8
Cleveland	5–13	6–12	4–8	4–8	—	7–11	7–5	5–7	9–8	5–7	7–5	3–15
Detroit	7–11	8–10	7–5	9–3	11–7	—	8–4	6–6	10–8	7–5	10–2	7–11
Kansas City	1–11	2–10	9–9	10–8	5–7	4–8	—	8–10	5–7–1	8–10	10–8	7–5
Minnesota	4–8	5–7	11–7	13–5	7–5	6–6	10–8	—	10–2	13–5	12–6	6–6
New York	7–11	7–11	9–3	9–3	8–9	8–10	7–5–1	2–10	—	6–6	7–5	10–8
Oakland	4–8	8–4	12–6	10–8	7–5	5–7	10–8	5–13	6–6	—	13–5	8–4
Seattle	3–9	6–6	9–9–1	8–10	5–7	2–10	8–10	6–12	5–7	5–13	—	7–5
Washington	5–13	12–6	7–5	8–4	15–3	11–7	5–7	6–6	8–10	4–8	5–7	—

=== Notable transactions ===
- June 14, 1969: Ron Woods was traded by the Tigers to the New York Yankees for Tom Tresh.
- August 8, 1969: Don McMahon was traded by the Tigers to the San Francisco Giants for a player to be named later. The Giants completed the deal by sending César Gutiérrez to the Tigers on September 2.

=== Roster ===
1969 Detroit Tigers
Roster
Pitchers: 22 Pat Dobson; 18 John Hiller; 35 Mike Kilkenny; 15 Fred Lasher; 29 Mickey Lolich; 17 Denny McLain; 47 Don McMahon; 36 Norm McRae; 43 Daryl Patterson; 14 Dick Radatz; 20 Bob Reed; 39 Fred Scherman; 21 Joe Sparma; 47 Gary Taylor; 28 Tom Timmermann; 16 Earl Wilson	Catchers: 11 Bill Freehan; 12 Jim Price; Infielders: 9 Ike Brown; 33 Dave Campbell; 25 Norm Cash; 7 César Gutiérrez; 2 Tom Matchick; 3 Dick McAuliffe; 44 Dick Tracewski; 4 Tom Tresh; 8 Don Wert	Outfielders: 26 Gates Brown; 23 Willie Horton; 6 Al Kaline; 5 Jim Northrup; 24 Mickey Stanley; 27 Ron Woods; Other batters: 31 Wayne Redmond	Manager: 10 Mayo Smith; Coaches: 51 Wally Moses; 52 Hal Naragon; 50 Grover Resinger; 53 Johnny Sain

== Player stats ==
=== Batting ===
= Indicates team leader

==== Starters by position ====
Note: G = Games played; AB = At bats; H = Hits; Avg. = Batting average; HR = Home runs; RBI = Runs batted in

Pos	Player	G	AB	H	Avg.	HR	RBI
C	Bill Freehan	143	489	128	.262	16	49
1B	Norm Cash	143	483	135	.280	22	74
2B	Dick McAuliffe	74	262	71	.262	11	33
SS	Tom Tresh	94	331	74	.224	13	37
3B	Don Wert	132	423	95	.225	14	50
LF	Willie Horton	141	508	133	.262	28	91
CF	Jim Northrup	148	543	160	.295	25	66
RF	Al Kaline	131	456	124	.272	21	69

==== Other batters ====
Note: G = Games played; AB = At bats; H = Hits; Avg. = Batting average; HR = Home runs; RBI = Runs batted in

Player	G	AB	H	Avg.	HR	RBI
Mickey Stanley	149	592	139	.235	16	70
Tom Matchick	94	298	72	.242	0	32
Jim Price	72	192	45	.234	9	28
Ike Brown	70	170	39	.229	5	12
Gates Brown	60	93	19	.204	1	6
Dick Tracewski	66	79	11	.139	0	4
César Gutiérrez	17	49	12	.245	0	0
Dave Campbell	32	39	4	.103	0	2
Ron Woods	17	15	4	.267	1	3
Wayne Redmond	5	3	0	.000	0	0

=== Pitching ===
= Indicates league leader

==== Starting pitchers ====
Note: G = Games pitched; IP = Innings pitched; W = Wins; L = Losses; ERA = Earned run average; SO = Strikeouts

Player	G	IP	W	L	ERA	SO
Denny McLain	42	325.0	24	9	2.80	181
Mickey Lolich	37	280.2	19	11	3.14	271
Earl Wilson	35	214.2	12	10	3.31	150

==== Other pitchers ====
Note: G = Games pitched; IP = Innings pitched; W = Wins; L = Losses; ERA = Earned run average; SO = Strikeouts

Player	G	IP	W	L	ERA	SO
Mike Kilkenny	39	128.1	8	6	3.37	97
Pat Dobson	49	105.0	5	10	3.60	64
John Hiller	40	99.1	4	4	3.99	74
Joe Sparma	23	92.2	6	8	4.76	41
Bob Reed	8	14.2	0	0	1.84	9

==== Relief pitchers ====
Note: G = Games pitched; W = Wins; L = Losses; SV = Saves; ERA = Earned run average; SO = Strikeouts

Player	G	W	L	SV	ERA	SO
Don McMahon	34	3	5	11	3.89	38
Fred Lasher	32	2	1	0	3.07	26
Tom Timmermann	31	4	3	1	2.75	42
Daryl Patterson	18	0	2	0	2.82	12
Dick Radatz	11	2	2	0	3.38	18
Gary Taylor	7	0	1	0	5.23	3
Fred Scherman	4	1	0	0	6.75	3
Norm McRae	3	0	0	0	6.00	3

== Farm system ==
Level	Team	League	Manager
AAA	Toledo Mud Hens	International League	Jack Tighe
AA	Montgomery Rebels	Southern League	Frank Carswell
A	Rocky Mount Leafs	Carolina League	Al Federoff
A	Lakeland Tigers	Florida State League	Len Okrie
A-Short Season	Batavia Trojans	New York–Penn League	Bob Dustal
Rookie	Bristol Tigers	Appalachian League	Bill Lajoie

== Awards and honors ==
- Al Kaline, Hutch Award
