= 1969 New York Yankees season =

Season for the Major League Baseball team the New York Yankees

1969 New York Yankees
- League: American League
- Division: East
- Ballpark: Yankee Stadium
- City: New York City
- Record: 80-81 (.497)
- Owners: CBS
- General managers: Lee MacPhail
- Managers: Ralph Houk
- Television: WPIX (Phil Rizzuto, Jerry Coleman, Frank Messer, Whitey Ford)
- Radio: WHN (Frank Messer, Phil Rizzuto, Jerry Coleman)

The 1969 New York Yankees season was the 67th season for the team. The team finished in fifth-place in the newly established American League East with a record of 80–81, 28 1/2 games behind the Baltimore Orioles. New York was managed by Ralph Houk. The Yankees played at Yankee Stadium. This was the first Yankee team since 1912 (when they were called the Highlanders) to no players on the roster who would eventually end up in the Hall of Fame.

== Offseason ==
- October 15, 1968: Steve Barber was drafted from the Yankees by the Seattle Pilots as the 37th pick in the 1968 MLB expansion draft.
- October 21, 1968: Jim Bouton was purchased from the Yankees by the Seattle Pilots.
- December 2, 1968: Billy Cowan was drafted by the Yankees from the Philadelphia Phillies in the 1968 rule 5 draft.
- December 4, 1968: Andy Kosco was traded by the Yankees to the Los Angeles Dodgers for Mike Kekich.
- December 6, 1968: Charley Smith was traded by the Yankees to the San Francisco Giants for Nate Oliver.
- January 8, 1969: John Orsino was purchased by the Yankees from the Washington Senators.
- Prior to 1969 season: Merritt Ranew was acquired from the Yankees by the Seattle Pilots.

== Regular season ==
- August 8, 1969: Thurman Munson made his major league debut for the Yankees.

=== Season standings ===
AL East
Team	W	L	Pct.	GB	Home	Road
Baltimore Orioles	109	53	.673	—	60‍–‍21	49‍–‍32
Detroit Tigers	90	72	.556	19	46‍–‍35	44‍–‍37
Boston Red Sox	87	75	.537	22	46‍–‍35	41‍–‍40
Washington Senators	86	76	.531	23	47‍–‍34	39‍–‍42
New York Yankees	80	81	.497	28½	48‍–‍32	32‍–‍49
Cleveland Indians	62	99	.385	46½	33‍–‍48	29‍–‍51

=== Record vs. opponents ===
1969 American League records Sources:
Team	BAL	BOS	CAL	CWS	CLE	DET	KC	MIN	NYY	OAK	SEA	WAS
Baltimore	—	10–8	6–6	9–3	13–5	11–7	11–1	8–4	11–7	8–4	9–3	13–5
Boston	8–10	—	8–4	5–7	12–6	10–8	10–2	7–5	11–7	4–8	6–6	6–12
California	6–6	4–8	—	9–9	8–4	5–7	9–9	7–11	3–9	6–12	9–9–1	5–7
Chicago	3–9	7–5	9–9	—	8–4	3–9	8–10	5–13	3–9	8–10	10–8	4–8
Cleveland	5–13	6–12	4–8	4–8	—	7–11	7–5	5–7	9–8	5–7	7–5	3–15
Detroit	7–11	8–10	7–5	9–3	11–7	—	8–4	6–6	10–8	7–5	10–2	7–11
Kansas City	1–11	2–10	9–9	10–8	5–7	4–8	—	8–10	5–7–1	8–10	10–8	7–5
Minnesota	4–8	5–7	11–7	13–5	7–5	6–6	10–8	—	10–2	13–5	12–6	6–6
New York	7–11	7–11	9–3	9–3	8–9	8–10	7–5–1	2–10	—	6–6	7–5	10–8
Oakland	4–8	8–4	12–6	10–8	7–5	5–7	10–8	5–13	6–6	—	13–5	8–4
Seattle	3–9	6–6	9–9–1	8–10	5–7	2–10	8–10	6–12	5–7	5–13	—	7–5
Washington	5–13	12–6	7–5	8–4	15–3	11–7	5–7	6–6	8–10	4–8	5–7	—

=== Opening Day lineup ===
- Horace Clarke 2B
- Jerry Kenney CF
- Bobby Murcer 3B
- Roy White LF
- Joe Pepitone 1B
- Tom Tresh SS
- Bill Robinson RF
- Jake Gibbs C
- Mel Stottlemyre P

=== Notable transactions ===
- June 5, 1969: 1969 Major League Baseball draft
  - Ken Crosby was drafted by the Yankees in the 10th round. Player signed June 17, 1969.
  - John Tamargo was drafted by the Yankees in the 15th round, but did not sign.
- June 12, 1969: John Orsino was traded by the Yankees to the Cleveland Indians for Rob Gardner.
- June 14, 1969: Tom Tresh was traded by the Yankees to the Detroit Tigers for Ron Woods.
- July 26, 1969: Billy Cowan was purchased by the California Angels from the New York Yankees.

=== Mickey Mantle's retired number ===
Mickey Mantle's number 7 was retired by the New York Yankees in 1969.

On Mickey Mantle Day, June 8, 1969, in addition to the retirement of his uniform number 7, Mantle was given a plaque that would hang on the center field wall at Yankee Stadium, near the monuments to Babe Ruth, Lou Gehrig and Miller Huggins. The plaque was given to him by Joe DiMaggio, and Mantle then gave DiMaggio a similar plaque, telling the crowd, "His should be just a little bit higher than mine." The televised ceremony, aired on WPIX, was hosted by the team's television analyst Frank Messer and long time radio broadcaster Mel Allen.

=== Roster ===
1969 New York Yankees
Roster
Pitchers: 22 Jack Aker; 45 Stan Bahnsen; 50 Bill Burbach; 56 John Cumberland; 24 Al Downing; 39 Steve Hamilton; 54 Ken Johnson; 18 Mike Kekich; 51 Ron Klimkowski; 40 Lindy McDaniel; 23 Don Nottebart; 19 Fritz Peterson; 30 Mel Stottlemyre; 22 Fred Talbot	Catchers: 23 John Ellis; 10 Frank Fernández; 41 Jake Gibbs; 15 Thurman Munson; Infielders: 38 Len Boehmer; 20 Horace Clarke; 14 Bobby Cox; 2 Jerry Kenney; 55 Dave McDonald; 17 Gene Michael; 25 Joe Pepitone; 15 Tom Tresh	Outfielders: 12 Ron Blomberg; 12 Billy Cowan; 26 Jimmie Hall; 21 Jim Lyttle; 1 Bobby Murcer; 11 Bill Robinson; 27 Tom Shopay; 9 Dick Simpson; 21 Frank Tepedino; 6 Roy White; 9 Ron Woods; Other batters: 21 Nate Oliver	Manager: 35 Ralph Houk; Coaches: 44 Jim Hegan; 32 Elston Howard; 34 Dick Howser; 55 Spud Murray; 31 Jim Turner

== Player stats ==
= Indicates team leader

=== Batting ===
==== Starters by position ====
Note: Pos = Position; G = Games played; AB = At bats; R = Runs scored; H = Hits; Avg. = Batting average; HR = Home runs; RBI = Runs batted in; SB = Stolen bases

Pos	Player	G	AB	R	H	Avg.	HR	RBI	SB
C	Jake Gibbs	71	219	18	49	.224	0	18	3
1B	Joe Pepitone	135	513	49	124	.242	27	70	8
2B	Horace Clarke	156	641	82	183	.285	4	48	33
3B	Jerry Kenney	130	447	49	115	.257	2	34	25
SS	Gene Michael	119	412	41	112	.272	2	31	7
LF	Roy White	130	448	55	130	.290	7	74	18
CF	Ron Woods	72	171	18	30	.175	1	7	2
RF	Bobby Murcer	152	564	82	146	.259	26	82	7

==== Other batters ====
Note: G = Games played; AB = At bats; R = Runs scored; H = Hits; Avg. = Batting average; HR = Home runs; RBI = Runs batted in; SB = Stolen bases

Player	G	AB	R	H	Avg.	HR	RBI	SB
Frank Fernández	89	229	34	51	.223	12	29	1
Bill Robinson	87	222	23	38	.171	3	21	3
Jimmie Hall	80	212	21	50	.236	3	26	8
Bobby Cox	85	191	17	41	.215	2	17	0
Tom Tresh	45	143	13	26	.182	1	9	2
Len Boehmer	45	108	5	19	.176	0	7	0
Thurman Munson	26	86	6	22	.256	1	9	0
Jim Lyttle	28	83	7	15	.181	0	4	1
John Ellis	22	62	2	18	.290	1	8	0
Tom Shopay	28	48	2	4	.083	0	0	0
Billy Cowan	32	48	5	8	.167	1	3	0
Frank Tepedino	13	39	6	9	.231	0	4	1
Dave McDonald	9	23	0	5	.217	0	2	0
Dick Simpson	6	11	2	3	.273	0	4	0
Ron Blomberg	4	6	0	3	.500	0	0	0
Nate Oliver	1	1	0	0	.000	0	0	0

=== Pitching ===
==== Starting pitchers ====
Note: G = Games pitched; IP = Innings pitched; W = Wins; L = Losses; ERA = Earned run average; BB = Walks allowed; SO = Strikeouts

Player	G	IP	W	L	ERA	BB	SO
Mel Stottlemyre	39	303.0	20	14	2.82	97	113
Fritz Peterson	37	272.0	17	16	2.55	43	150
Stan Bahnsen	40	220.2	9	16	3.83	90	130
Bill Burbach	31	140.2	6	8	3.65	102	82

==== Other pitchers ====
Note: G = Games pitched; IP = Innings pitched; W = Wins; L = Losses; ERA = Earned run average; SO = Strikeouts

Player	G	IP	W	L	ERA	SO
Al Downing	30	130.2	7	5	3.38	85
Mike Kekich	28	105.0	4	6	4.54	66
Ron Klimkowski	3	14.0	0	0	0.64	3

==== Relief pitchers ====
Note: G = Games pitched; W = Wins; L = Losses; SV = Saves; ERA = Earned run average; SO = Strikeouts

Player	G	W	L	SV	ERA	SO
Jack Aker	38	8	4	11	2.06	40
Lindy McDaniel	51	5	6	5	3.55	60
Steve Hamilton	38	3	4	2	3.32	39
Ken Johnson	12	1	2	0	3.46	21
Fred Talbot	8	0	0	0	5.11	7
Don Nottebart	4	0	0	0	4.50	5
John Cumberland	2	0	0	0	4.50	0

== Awards and honors ==
- Mel Stottlemyre, All-Star Game
- Roy White, All-Star Game

== Farm system ==
Level	Team	League	Manager
AAA	Syracuse Chiefs	International League	Frank Verdi
AA	Manchester Yankees	Eastern League	Jerry Walker
A	Kinston Eagles	Carolina League	Gene Hassell
A	Fort Lauderdale Yankees	Florida State League	Billy Shantz
A-Short Season	Oneonta Yankees	New York–Penn League	George Case
Rookie	Johnson City Yankees	Appalachian League	Bill Monbouquette

LEAGUE CHAMPIONS: Syracuse, Oneonta
