= 1969 Cleveland Indians season =

1969 Cleveland Indians
- League: American League
- Division: East
- Ballpark: Cleveland Municipal Stadium
- City: Cleveland, Ohio
- Owners: Vernon Stouffer
- General managers: Gabe Paul, Alvin Dark
- Managers: Alvin Dark
- Television: WJW-TV
- Radio: WERE (1300)

The 1969 Cleveland Indians season was a season in American baseball. The club finished in last place in the newly established American League East with a record of 62 wins and 99 losses. The 1969 season seemed hopeful before the season started, based on the Indians' modest 86–75 record the previous season, along with their solid pitching. However, a 1–15 start shattered any illusions of a successful season. Not helping, was that the Indians strong pitching the previous season fell apart. Luis Tiant fell to 9–20 in 1969 and didn't look like the same pitcher from 1968, when he went 21–9, with a 1.60 ERA. Sam McDowell stayed solid at the very least, going 18–14, with a 2.94 ERA.

== Offseason ==
- October 8, 1968: Eddie Fisher was traded by the Cleveland Indians to the California Angels for Jack Hamilton.
- October 15, 1968: 1968 Major League Baseball expansion draft
  - Chico Salmon was drafted from the Indians by the Seattle Pilots as the 11th pick.
  - Lou Piniella was drafted from the Indians by the Pilots as the 28th pick.

== Regular season ==
=== Season standings ===
AL East
Team	W	L	Pct.	GB	Home	Road
Baltimore Orioles	109	53	.673	—	60‍–‍21	49‍–‍32
Detroit Tigers	90	72	.556	19	46‍–‍35	44‍–‍37
Boston Red Sox	87	75	.537	22	46‍–‍35	41‍–‍40
Washington Senators	86	76	.531	23	47‍–‍34	39‍–‍42
New York Yankees	80	81	.497	28½	48‍–‍32	32‍–‍49
Cleveland Indians	62	99	.385	46½	33‍–‍48	29‍–‍51

=== Record vs. opponents ===
1969 American League records Sources:
Team	BAL	BOS	CAL	CWS	CLE	DET	KC	MIN	NYY	OAK	SEA	WAS
Baltimore	—	10–8	6–6	9–3	13–5	11–7	11–1	8–4	11–7	8–4	9–3	13–5
Boston	8–10	—	8–4	5–7	12–6	10–8	10–2	7–5	11–7	4–8	6–6	6–12
California	6–6	4–8	—	9–9	8–4	5–7	9–9	7–11	3–9	6–12	9–9–1	5–7
Chicago	3–9	7–5	9–9	—	8–4	3–9	8–10	5–13	3–9	8–10	10–8	4–8
Cleveland	5–13	6–12	4–8	4–8	—	7–11	7–5	5–7	9–8	5–7	7–5	3–15
Detroit	7–11	8–10	7–5	9–3	11–7	—	8–4	6–6	10–8	7–5	10–2	7–11
Kansas City	1–11	2–10	9–9	10–8	5–7	4–8	—	8–10	5–7–1	8–10	10–8	7–5
Minnesota	4–8	5–7	11–7	13–5	7–5	6–6	10–8	—	10–2	13–5	12–6	6–6
New York	7–11	7–11	9–3	9–3	8–9	8–10	7–5–1	2–10	—	6–6	7–5	10–8
Oakland	4–8	8–4	12–6	10–8	7–5	5–7	10–8	5–13	6–6	—	13–5	8–4
Seattle	3–9	6–6	9–9–1	8–10	5–7	2–10	8–10	6–12	5–7	5–13	—	7–5
Washington	5–13	12–6	7–5	8–4	15–3	11–7	5–7	6–6	8–10	4–8	5–7	—

=== Notable transactions ===
- April 10, 1969: Oscar Zamora was released by the Indians.
- April 19, 1969: Joe Azcue, Vicente Romo and Sonny Siebert were traded by the Indians to the Boston Red Sox for Dick Ellsworth, Ken Harrelson and Juan Pizarro.
- June 12, 1969: Rob Gardner was traded by the Indians to the New York Yankees for John Orsino.
- June 20, 1969: Lee Maye was traded by the Indians to the Washington Senators for Bill Denehy and cash.

=== Opening Day Lineup ===
Opening Day Starters
#	Name	Position
1	José Cardenal	CF
16	Larry Brown	SS
28	Richie Scheinblum	RF
11	Tony Horton	1B
20	Jimmie Hall	LF
7	Joe Azcue	C
17	Zoilo Versalles	3B
13	Vern Fuller	2B
33	Luis Tiant	P

=== Roster ===
1969 Cleveland Indians
Roster
Pitchers: 54 Gary Boyd; 36 Larry Burchart; 42 Dick Ellsworth; 32 Jack Hamilton; 34 Steve Hargan; 38 Phil Hennigan; 37 Gary Kroll; 41 Ron Law; 48 Sam McDowell; 39 Mike Paul; 31 Horacio Piña; 43 Juan Pizarro; 43 Vicente Romo; 42 Sonny Siebert; 33 Luis Tiant; 35 Stan Williams	Catchers: 7 Joe Azcue; 8 Ray Fosse; 9 Duke Sims; 7 Ken Suarez; Infielders: 10 Max Alvis; 16 Larry Brown; 17 Lou Camilli; 13 Vern Fuller; 18 Jack Heidemann; 11 Tony Horton; 29 Lou Klimchock; 24 Eddie Leon; 14 Dave Nelson; 17 Zoilo Versalles	Outfielders: 21 Frank Baker; 1 José Cardenal; 20 Jimmie Hall; 40 Ken Harrelson; 23 Chuck Hinton; 26 Lee Maye; 25 Russ Nagelson; 20 Cap Peterson; 28 Richie Scheinblum; 27 Russ Snyder	Manager: 5 Alvin Dark; Coaches: 12,7 Luke Easter (Hitting); 4 Johnny Lipon (First Base); 2 Jack Sanford (Pitching); 3 George Strickland (Third Base)

== Player stats ==
=== Batting ===
==== Starters by position ====
Note: Pos = Position; G = Games played; AB = At bats; H = Hits; Avg. = Batting average; HR = Home runs; RBI = Runs batted in

Pos	Player	G	AB	H	Avg.	HR	RBI
C	Duke Sims	114	326	77	.236	18	45
1B	Tony Horton	159	625	174	.278	27	93
2B	Vern Fuller	108	254	60	.236	4	22
SS	Larry Brown	132	469	112	.239	4	24
3B	Max Alvis	66	191	43	.225	1	15
LF	Frank Baker	52	172	44	.256	3	15
CF	José Cardenal	146	557	143	.257	11	45
RF	Ken Harrelson	149	519	115	.222	27	84

==== Other batters ====
Note: G = Games played; AB = At bats; H = Hits; Avg. = Batting average; HR = Home runs; RBI = Runs batted in

Player	G	AB	H	Avg.	HR	RBI
Russ Snyder	122	266	66	.248	2	24
Lou Klimchock	90	258	74	.287	6	26
Zoilo Versalles	72	217	49	.226	1	13
Eddie Leon	64	213	51	.239	3	19
Richie Scheinblum	102	199	37	.186	1	13
Dave Nelson	52	123	25	.203	0	6
Chuck Hinton	94	121	31	.256	3	19
Ray Fosse	37	116	20	.172	2	9
Cap Peterson	76	110	25	.227	1	14
Lee Maye	43	108	27	.250	1	15
Ken Suarez	36	85	25	.294	1	9
Joe Azcue	7	24	7	.292	1	1
Russ Nagelson	12	17	6	.353	0	0
Lou Camilli	13	14	0	.000	0	0
Jimmie Hall	4	10	0	.000	0	0
Jack Heidemann	3	3	0	.000	0	0

=== Pitching ===
= Indicates league leader

==== Starting pitchers ====
Note: G = Games pitched; IP = Innings pitched; W = Wins; L = Losses; ERA = Earned run average; SO = Strikeouts

Player	G	IP	W	L	ERA	SO
Sam McDowell	39	285.0	18	14	2.94	279
Luis Tiant	38	249.2	9	20	3.71	156
Sonny Siebert	2	14.0	0	1	3.21	6

==== Other pitchers ====
Note: G = Games pitched; IP = Innings pitched; W = Wins; L = Losses; ERA = Earned run average; SO = Strikeouts

Player	G	IP	W	L	ERA	SO
Stan Williams	61	178.1	6	14	3.94	139
Steve Hargan	32	143.2	5	14	5.70	76
Dick Ellsworth	34	135.0	6	9	4.13	48
Mike Paul	47	117.1	5	10	3.61	98
Gary Boyd	8	11.0	0	2	9.00	9

==== Relief pitchers ====
Note: G = Games pitched; W = Wins; L = Losses; SV = Saves; ERA = Earned run average; SO = Strikeouts

Player	G	W	L	SV	ERA	SO
Juan Pizarro	48	3	3	4	3.16	44
Ron Law	35	3	4	1	4.99	29
Horacio Piña	31	4	2	1	5.21	32
Larry Burchart	29	0	2	0	4.25	26
Jack Hamilton	20	0	2	1	4.40	13
Gary Kroll	19	0	0	0	4.13	28
Phil Hennigan	9	2	1	0	3.31	10
Vicente Romo	3	1	1	0	2.25	7

== Awards and honors ==
All-Star Game

== Farm system ==
Level	Team	League	Manager
AAA	Portland Beavers	Pacific Coast League	Red Davis
AA	Waterbury Indians	Eastern League	Clay Bryant
A	Reno Silver Sox	California League	Ken Aspromonte
A	Statesville/Monroe Indians	Western Carolinas League	Pinky May
Rookie	GCL Indians	Gulf Coast League	Joe Lutz

Statesville franchise moved to Monroe, June 20, 1969
