= Ron Law =

Canadian baseball player (1946–1994)

- Pitcher
- Born: March 14, 1946; Hamilton, Ontario, Canada
- Died: July 5, 1994 (aged 48); St. Petersburg, Florida, U.S.
- Batted: Right Threw: Right

MLB debut
- June 29, 1969, for the Cleveland Indians

Last MLB appearance
- September 30, 1969, for the Cleveland Indians

MLB statistics
- Win–loss record: 3–4
- Earned run average: 4.99
- Strikeouts: 29
- Stats at Baseball Reference

Teams
- Cleveland Indians (1969)

Ronald David Law (March 14, 1946 – July 5, 1994) was a Canadian professional baseball pitcher who appeared in 35 games for the 1969 Cleveland Indians. Born in Hamilton, Ontario, Law threw and batted right-handed. Law worked in 521/3 MLB innings, permitting 68 hits and 34 bases on balls and throwing 29 strikeouts.

== Career ==
Law's ten-season pro career began in the Chicago Cubs organization in 1964. He spent 1964 with the Treasure Valley Cubs and 1965 with the Quincy Cubs, where he had a 11–8 win–loss record and a 2.23 earned run average (ERA) in 29 games. In 1966, Law was promoted to the Dallas-Fort Worth Spurs, where he finished the year with a 10–11 record and a 3.10 ERA in 36 games. He split the 1967 season with Dallas-Fort Worth and the Lodi Crushers, and split the 1968 season between Lodi and the San Antonio Missions. After the season ended, the Cleveland Indians selected him in the 1968 minor league draft alongside four others.

Law spent the early months of the 1969 season with the Waterbury Indians of the Double-A Eastern League, compiling an 8–4 record in 13 games. Recalled to Cleveland in June, Law appeared in 34 games in relief and made one start. He won three games and saved another. In his lone start on July 8 against the Washington Senators, he lasted only 21/3 innings and allowed five hits, two bases on balls and five earned runs, but the Indians battled back to win the game, 6–5.

During the off-season, on December 5, he was traded to Washington with pitcher Horacio Piña and infielder Dave Nelson for pitchers Dennis Higgins and Barry Moore. He pitched at Triple-A for the rest of his career. He spent 1970 and 1971 with the Denver Bears, and split the 1972 season with Denver and the Tacoma Twins. He finished his professional career in 1973 with the Charros de Jalisco of the Mexican League.
