= Major League Baseball logo =

The Major League Baseball logo

The Major League Baseball logo was designed by Jerry Dior in 1968 and was included on all on-field uniforms of Major League Baseball (MLB) employees beginning in the 1969 season.

== Creation ==
The logo was created in a single afternoon. Contrary to popular belief, the silhouette was not modeled on Hall of Famer Harmon Killebrew, or any specific player but was drawn with reference to photographs of several players. The silhouette was chosen specifically because of its ambiguity: the batter could be right- or left-handed and of any ethnic background.

The MLB "Batter" logo was commissioned by the Major League Baseball Centennial Committee, and was introduced by the new Baseball Commissioner, Bowie Kuhn, to be used in preparations for, and celebration of, the 1869–1969 Professional Baseball Centennial Celebration held July 21, 1969, in Washington, DC.

The first MLB "Batter" logo official colors were royal blue, white and red from left to right. In 2019, dark blue replaced royal blue as one of the colors along with white and red as the current logo. The logo also appears on the annual All-Star Game with the host city and year along with the World Series.

For many years, the authorship of the logo was a matter of some dispute as two graphic designers laid claim to creating the piece: Jerry Dior (working for the marketing firm of Sandgren & Murtha) and James Sherman, a comic book illustrator. In November 2008, ESPN writer Paul Lukas managed to clear the matter up and Dior's authorship is no longer in doubt. Upon being informed that the logo had been used by the MLB starting in 1968, Sherman declared:

That's not my logo, and I was totally unaware that it existed... The logo I created was very similar, but I designed it in the early 1980s. All I can say is that I was so sports-unaware that I didn't know about the earlier logo. I feel like a total idiot now that I didn't know about it. I'm flabbergasted.

== Popularity and influence ==
The logo has not been changed in the years since its adoption, except for small variations in the shades of blue and red, and that individual teams sometimes alter the coloring to match their uniform colors. Since its adoption, the basic model of an athlete (or equipment used for the sport) in silhouette flanked by red and blue color blocks has also been incorporated in the logos of the National Basketball Association (with Jerry West as its player model), Minor League Baseball, Women's National Basketball Association, Arena Football League, U.S. Figure Skating, Hockey Canada, American Hockey League, National Women's Soccer League, PGA Tour, National Lacrosse League, Indy Racing League, and Major League Gaming. It has also been parodied in Major League Eating.

Alan Siegel, who oversaw Dior's logo, deliberately based his NBA logo design on MLB's in 1969 because NBA Commissioner J. Walter Kennedy wanted a family relationship between the sports seen as being All-American.
