= César Gutiérrez =

Venezuelan baseball player (1943–2005)

- Shortstop
- Born: January 26, 1943; Santa Ana de Coro, Falcón, Venezuela
- Died: January 22, 2005 (aged 61); Cabimas, Zulia, Venezuela
- Batted: Right Threw: Right

MLB debut
- April 16, 1967, for the San Francisco Giants

Last MLB appearance
- September 26, 1971, for the Detroit Tigers

MLB statistics
- Batting average: .235
- Hits: 128
- Sacrifice hits: 19
- Stats at Baseball Reference

Teams
- MLB: San Francisco Giants (1967, 1969); Detroit Tigers (1969–1971); VPBL: Leones del Caracas (1960-1965); Navegantes del Magallanes (1965-1969); Tigres de Aragua (1969-1974); Águilas del Zulia (1974-1975); Cardenales de Lara (1975-1976)

Career highlights and awards
- Hit 7-for-7 in a single game without making an out (1970)

César Dario Gutiérrez [goo-te-er'-rez] (January 26, 1943 – January 22, 2005), also nicknamed "Cocoa", was a Venezuelan professional baseball player. He played as a shortstop in Major League Baseball for the San Francisco Giants in the 1967 and 1969 seasons, and for the Detroit Tigers from 1969 to 1971. Listed at 5'9" and 155 lbs, he batted and threw right handed. Gutiérrez is notable for being the second player in Major League history to record seven hits in a game without making an out.

== Career ==
Born in Coro, Falcón, Gutiérrez was signed by the Pittsburgh Pirates as an amateur free agent in 1960. He was released in 1962, then was signed by the Giants before the 1963 season. Gutiérrez hit a combined .182 average in just 33 games for the Giants in parts of two seasons, before being traded to Detroit during the 1969 midseason.

His most productive season came in 1970 with the Tigers, when he became the everyday shortstop for the team, while posting career-highs in batting average (.243), RBI (22), runs (40), hits (101), doubles (11), triples (6), stolen bases (4) and games played (135), although he committed 23 errors for the third highest total in the league.

On June 21, 1970 in the second game of a doubleheader against the Cleveland Indians, Gutiérrez collected seven hits in seven at bats including a double, to become the second player in Major League history, after Wilbert Robinson, to record seven hits in a game without making an out. The Tigers won 9–8 in twelve innings, as his batting average went up 31 points that day, from .218 to .249.

Nevertheless, in 1971, Gutiérrez lost his regular shortstop position to Ed Brinkman, who had been acquired in a blockbuster six-player trade with the Washington Senators in the off-season. He played 40 games as a utility infielder for Detroit, batting only .189. Gutiérrez was sold to the Montreal Expos prior to the start of the next season, being assigned to their Triple-A affiliate, the Peninsula Whips, where after playing in only 12 games he was then released and picked up by the San Diego Padres, who assigned him to their Triple-A Hawaii Islanders affiliate club. Gutiérrez played the rest of the 1972 season in Hawaii, and retired at the end of the year.

== Career statistics ==
In a four-year career, Gutiérrez played in 223 games, accumulating 128 hits in 545 at bats for a .235 career batting average and 26 runs batted in without home runs. He ended his career with a .953 fielding percentage.

In between, Gutiérrez played winter baseball in the Venezuelan League from 1961 to 1976. He later became a manager in the Mexican League, and served as a coach and scout with several teams.

Gutiérrez died in Cabimas, Zulia State, Venezuela, four days short of his 62nd birthday.

== See also ==
- List of Major League Baseball players from Venezuela
- List of Major League Baseball hit records
- List of Major League Baseball single-game hits leaders
