= Gary Boyd (baseball) =

American baseball player (1946–2025)

- Pitcher
- Born: August 22, 1946; Pasadena, California, U.S.
- Died: June 10, 2025 (aged 78); Gardena, California, U.S.
- Batted: Right Threw: Right

MLB debut
- August 1, 1969, for the Cleveland Indians

Last MLB appearance
- September 26, 1969, for the Cleveland Indians

MLB statistics
- Win–loss record: 0–2
- Earned run average: 9.00
- Strikeouts: 9
- Stats at Baseball Reference

Teams
- Cleveland Indians (1969)

Gary Lee Boyd (August 22, 1946 – June 10, 2025) was an American professional baseball player. A right-handed pitcher, he appeared in eight games in Major League Baseball for the 1969 Cleveland Indians. He stood 6 feet 4 inches (1.93 m) tall and weighed 200 pounds (91 kg).

== Baseball career ==
A native of Pasadena, California, Boyd played baseball at Juniperro Serra High School in Gardena, graduating in 1964. Cleveland selected Boyd in the fourth round of the 1965 Major League Baseball draft, the first such amateur lottery ever conducted. During his fourth season in the Indians' farm system he was recalled from the Triple-A Portland Beavers in midsummer and made his MLB debut as a starting pitcher against the Kansas City Royals on August 1. Plagued by wildness, he issued four bases on balls and threw a wild pitch in 12/3 innings pitched and was relieved in the second frame with the Indians trailing, 2–0. Boyd was tagged with the Tribe's eventual 6–0 loss.

He worked in seven more games for Cleveland that season, and was awarded two more starts. But he failed to last more than 21/3 innings in each, and concluded his MLB pitching career on September 26 by throwing an inning of scoreless relief against the Washington Senators. During his major league tenure, Boyd compiled an 0–2 won–lost record and an earned run average of 9.00. In 11 total innings pitched, he allowed only eight hits but 14 bases on balls. He struck out nine.

Boyd pitched in the high minors through 1972 before retiring after eight professional seasons.

== Death ==
Boyd died in Gardena, California on June 10, 2025, at the age of 78.
