= Gary Taylor (baseball) =

American baseball player (born 1945)

- Pitcher
- Born: October 19, 1945 (age 80); Detroit, Michigan, U.S.
- Died: March 29, 2026 (aged 80)
- Batted: Right Threw: Right

MLB debut
- September 2, 1969, for the Detroit Tigers

Last MLB appearance
- September 25, 1969, for the Detroit Tigers

MLB statistics
- Win–loss record: 0–1
- Earned run average: 5.23
- Strikeouts: 3
- Stats at Baseball Reference

Teams
- Detroit Tigers (1969)

Gary William Taylor (born October 19, 1945) is an American former professional baseball pitcher who appeared in seven games for the Detroit Tigers in 1969.
