= 1969 Baltimore Orioles season =

Major League Baseball season

1969 Baltimore Orioles
- American League champions American League East champions
- League: American League
- Division: East
- Ballpark: Memorial Stadium
- City: Baltimore, Maryland
- Record: 109–53 (.673)
- Divisional place: 1st
- Owners: Jerold Hoffberger
- General managers: Harry Dalton
- Managers: Earl Weaver
- Television: WJZ-TV
- Radio: WBAL (AM) (Chuck Thompson, Bill O'Donnell, Jim Karvellas)

The 1969 Baltimore Orioles season was a season in North America's Major League Baseball (MLB). In the first season after the American League was split into two divisions, the Orioles won the first-ever American League East title, finishing first with a record of 109 wins and 53 losses, 19 games ahead of the Detroit Tigers, who had won the World Series in the previous season.

After the regular season, the Orioles went on to the 1st American League Championship Series, where they faced the Minnesota Twins. They swept the Twins in the 1969 ALCS, but lost the World Series to the upstart National League champion New York Mets in five games.

The team was managed by Earl Weaver (in his first full season as manager), and played their home games at Memorial Stadium.

== Offseason ==
- October 15, 1968: Wally Bunker was drafted from the Orioles by the Kansas City Royals with the 25th pick in the 1968 Major League Baseball expansion draft.
- December 4, 1968: Curt Blefary and John Mason (minors) were traded by the Orioles to the Houston Astros for Mike Cuellar, Enzo Hernández, and Elijah Johnson (minors).
- December 2, 1968: Bobby Darwin was drafted from the Orioles by the Los Angeles Dodgers in the 1968 rule 5 draft.
- January 20, 1969: Ron Stone was traded by the Orioles to the Philadelphia Phillies for Clay Dalrymple.
- March 31, 1969: Gene Brabender and Gordy Lund were traded by the Orioles to the Seattle Pilots for Chico Salmon.

== Spring training ==
The Baltimore Orioles held spring training at Miami Stadium in Miami for the 11th season.

== Regular season ==
On August 13, 1969, Jim Palmer threw the only no-hitter of his career, defeating the Oakland Athletics, 8–0.

=== Season standings ===
AL East
Team	W	L	Pct.	GB	Home	Road
Baltimore Orioles	109	53	.673	—	60‍–‍21	49‍–‍32
Detroit Tigers	90	72	.556	19	46‍–‍35	44‍–‍37
Boston Red Sox	87	75	.537	22	46‍–‍35	41‍–‍40
Washington Senators	86	76	.531	23	47‍–‍34	39‍–‍42
New York Yankees	80	81	.497	28½	48‍–‍32	32‍–‍49
Cleveland Indians	62	99	.385	46½	33‍–‍48	29‍–‍51

=== Record vs. opponents ===
1969 American League records Sources:
Team	BAL	BOS	CAL	CWS	CLE	DET	KC	MIN	NYY	OAK	SEA	WAS
Baltimore	—	10–8	6–6	9–3	13–5	11–7	11–1	8–4	11–7	8–4	9–3	13–5
Boston	8–10	—	8–4	5–7	12–6	10–8	10–2	7–5	11–7	4–8	6–6	6–12
California	6–6	4–8	—	9–9	8–4	5–7	9–9	7–11	3–9	6–12	9–9–1	5–7
Chicago	3–9	7–5	9–9	—	8–4	3–9	8–10	5–13	3–9	8–10	10–8	4–8
Cleveland	5–13	6–12	4–8	4–8	—	7–11	7–5	5–7	9–8	5–7	7–5	3–15
Detroit	7–11	8–10	7–5	9–3	11–7	—	8–4	6–6	10–8	7–5	10–2	7–11
Kansas City	1–11	2–10	9–9	10–8	5–7	4–8	—	8–10	5–7–1	8–10	10–8	7–5
Minnesota	4–8	5–7	11–7	13–5	7–5	6–6	10–8	—	10–2	13–5	12–6	6–6
New York	7–11	7–11	9–3	9–3	8–9	8–10	7–5–1	2–10	—	6–6	7–5	10–8
Oakland	4–8	8–4	12–6	10–8	7–5	5–7	10–8	5–13	6–6	—	13–5	8–4
Seattle	3–9	6–6	9–9–1	8–10	5–7	2–10	8–10	6–12	5–7	5–13	—	7–5
Washington	5–13	12–6	7–5	8–4	15–3	11–7	5–7	6–6	8–10	4–8	5–7	—

=== Notable transactions ===
- June 5, 1969: 1969 Major League Baseball draft
  - Dave Skaggs was drafted by the Orioles in the 6th round.
  - Dave Winfield was drafted by the Orioles in the 40th round, but did not sign.
- August 16, 1969: Bob Galasso was signed as an amateur free agent by the Orioles.

=== Roster ===
1969 Baltimore Orioles
Roster
Pitchers: 17 Mike Adamson; 33 Fred Beene; 23 Frank Bertaina; 35 Mike Cuellar; 49,29 Dick Hall; 44 Jim Hardin; 40 Dave Leonhard; 29,32 Marcelino López; 19 Dave McNally; 22 Jim Palmer; 36 Tom Phoebus; 24 Pete Richert; 18 Al Severinsen; 39 Eddie Watt	Catchers: 3 Clay Dalrymple; 8 Andy Etchebarren; 10 Elrod Hendricks; Infielders: 7 Mark Belanger; 37 Terry Crowley; 2 Bobby Floyd; 15 Davey Johnson; 26 Boog Powell; 5 Brooks Robinson; 30 Chico Salmon	Outfielders: 6 Paul Blair; 9 Don Buford; 12 Dave May; 21 Curt Motton; 14 Merv Rettenmund; 20 Frank Robinson	Manager: 4 Earl Weaver; Coaches: 31 George Bamberger; 55 Billy Hunter; 41 Charley Lau; 48 George Staller

=== Game log ===
1969 Regular Season Game Log (109–53) (Home: 60–21; Road: 49–32)
April (16–7) (Home: 10–4; Road: 6–3)

#	Date	Opponent	Score	Win	Loss	Save	Attendance	Stadium	Record	Report	Rank	GB	
1	April 8	Red Sox	4–5 (12)				36,100		0–1		4	-1	3:41
2	April 10	Red Sox	2–1 (13)				3,091		1–1		3	-1	3:06
3	April 11	Senators	0–4				8,415		1–2		5	-1½	2:15
4	April 12	Senators	9–0				6,379		2–2		4	-1	2:16
5	April 13 (1)	Senators	2–0				–		3–2		2	-½	2:03
6	April 13 (2)	Senators	9–0				20,483		4–2		2	-½	2:07
7	April 14	@ Red Sox	3–5				33,899		4–3		2	-1½	2:30
8	April 15	@ Red Sox	10–5				9,673		5–3		2	-½	2:50
9	April 16	@ Red Sox	11–8 (8)				8,328		6–3		1	+½	2:45
10	April 17	@ Red Sox	9–5				8,910		7–3		1	+1	2:44
11	April 18	@ Senators	6–0						8–3				
12	April 19	@ Senators	5–7						8–4				
13	April 20	@ Senators	2–1						9–4				
14	April 20	@ Senators	2–5						9–5				
15	April 21	Indians	11–0						10–5				
16	April 22	Indians	3–2						11–5				
17	April 23	Tigers	3–2 (10)						12–5				
18	April 24	Tigers	5–2						13–5				
19	April 25	Yankees	2–7						13–6				
20	April 26	Yankees	5–6						13–7				
21	April 27	Yankees	6–0						14–7				
22	April 27	Yankees	10–5						15–7				
–	April 28	@ Indians	Postponed (rain); Makeup: June 20										
–	April 29	@ Indians	Postponed (rain); Makeup: August 4										
23	April 30	@ Tigers	3–2						16–7				

May (18–8) (Home: 7–4; Road: 11–4)

#	Date	Opponent	Score	Win	Loss	Save	Attendance	Stadium	Record	Report	Rank	GB
24	May 1	@ Tigers	0–2						16–8			
25	May 2	@ Yankees	5–1						17–8			
26	May 3	@ Yankees	5–4						18–8			
27	May 4	@ Yankees	5–3						19–8			
28	May 4	@ Yankees	14–2						20–8			
29	May 6	White Sox	0–1						20–9			
30	May 7	White Sox	4–6						20–10			
31	May 9	Royals	2–4						20–11			
32	May 10	Royals	6–5						21–11			
33	May 11	Royals	5–0						22–11			
34	May 13	@ Twins	2–4						22–12			
35	May 14	@ Twins	9–8						23–12			
36	May 15	@ Twins	5–0						24–12			
37	May 16	@ Royals	5–3 (11)						25–12			
38	May 17	@ Royals	4–2						26–12			
39	May 18	@ Royals	5–0						27–12			
40	May 20	Twins	2–3 (13)						27–13			
41	May 21	Twins	4–3						28–13			
42	May 22	Twins	6–2						29–13			
43	May 23	Athletics	4–3						30–13			
44	May 24	Athletics	2–1						31–13			
45	May 25	Athletics	5–3						32–13			
46	May 27	@ Pilots	1–8						32–14			
47	May 28	@ Pilots	9–5						33–14			
48	May 30	@ Angels	3–1						34–14			
49	May 31	@ Angels	3–4						34–15			

June (21–6) (Home: 8–4; Road: 13–2)

#	Date	Opponent	Score	Win	Loss	Save	Attendance	Stadium	Record	Report	Rank	GB
50	June 1	@ Angels	4–3						35–15			
51	June 3	@ Athletics	3–1 (11)						36–15			
52	June 4	@ Athletics	6–1						37–15			
53	June 6	Pilots	5–1						38–15			
54	June 7	Pilots	10–0						39–15			
55	June 8	Pilots	5–7						39–16			
56	June 10	Angels	11–4						40–16			
57	June 11	Angels	5–7 (14)						40–17			
58	June 13	@ White Sox	5–2						41–17			
59	June 14	@ White Sox	12–3						42–17			
60	June 15	@ White Sox	9–0						43–17			
61	June 15	@ White Sox	13–2						44–17			
62	June 17	@ Senators	5–1						45–17			
63	June 18	@ Senators	3–1						46–17			
64	June 19	@ Senators	2–0						47–17			
65	June 20	@ Indians	2–7						47–18			
66	June 20	@ Indians	5–1						48–18			
67	June 21	@ Indians	3–1						49–18			
68	June 22	@ Indians	2–3						49–19			
69	June 22	@ Indians	6–0						50–19			
70	June 23	Senators	5–3						51–19			
71	June 24	Senators	6–3 (11)						52–19			
72	June 25	Senators	8–11						52–20			
73	June 27	Tigers	4–1						53–20			
74	June 28	Tigers	6–4						54–20			
75	June 29	Tigers	2–3						54–21			
76	June 29	Tigers	4–3						55–21			

July (17–10) (Home: 13–3; Road: 4–7)

#	Date	Opponent	Score	Win	Loss	Save	Attendance	Stadium	Record	Report	Rank	GB
77	July 1	@ Yankees	9–10						55–22			
78	July 2	@ Yankees	2–3						55–23			
79	July 4	@ Tigers	1–4 (5)						55–24			
80	July 5	@ Tigers	9–3						56–24			
81	July 6	@ Tigers	4–5						56–25			
82	July 8	Yankees	10–3						57–25			
83	July 8	Yankees	4–1						58–25			
84	July 9	Yankees	6–5 (10)						59–25			
85	July 10	Red Sox	5–4						60–25			
86	July 11	Red Sox	4–7						60–26			
87	July 11	Red Sox	3–12						60–27			
88	July 12	Red Sox	4–0						61–27			
89	July 13	Red Sox	6–3						62–27			
90	July 15	Indians	5–1						63–27			
91	July 16	Indians	4–6						63–28			
92	July 16	Indians	6–5						64–28			
93	July 17	Indians	3–2						65–28			
94	July 18	@ Red Sox	1–6						65–29			
95	July 19	@ Red Sox	3–5						65–30			
96	July 20	@ Red Sox	5–6						65–31			
July 23: All-Star Game (NL wins—)			9–3	Carlton (STL)	Stottlemyre (NYY)		45,259	RFK Stadium	Washington, D.C.			
97	July 24	White Sox	5–2						66–31			
98	July 25	White Sox	4–2						67–31			
99	July 26	White Sox	2–1						68–31			
100	July 27	White Sox	17–0						69–31			
101	July 29	@ Royals	4–1						70–31			
102	July 30	@ Royals	4–2						71–31			
103	July 31	@ Royals	3–1						72–31			

August (19–12) (Home: 12–4; Road: 7–8)

#	Date	Opponent	Score	Win	Loss	Save	Attendance	Stadium	Record	Report	Rank	GB
104	August 1	@ Twins	3–4 (10)						72–32			
105	August 2	@ Twins	6–5						73–32			
106	August 3	@ Twins	2–5						73–33			
107	August 4	@ Indians	0–2						73–34			
108	August 5	Royals	7–5 (10)						74–34			
109	August 6	Royals	2–1						75–34			
110	August 7	Royals	10–2						76–34			
111	August 8	Twins	6–5						77–34			
112	August 9	Twins	5–1						78–34			
113	August 10	Twins	2–0						79–34			
114	August 11	Athletics	4–7						79–35			
115	August 12	Athletics	4–3						80–35			
116	August 13	Athletics	8–0						81–35			
117	August 15	@ Pilots	2–1						82–35			
118	August 16	@ Pilots	15–3						83–35			
119	August 17	@ Pilots	4–1						84–35			
120	August 18	@ Pilots	12–3						85–35			
121	August 19	@ Angels	10–0						86–35			
122	August 20	@ Angels	2–3						86–36			
123	August 21	@ Angels	0–2						86–37			
124	August 22	@ Athletics	4–3 (10)						87–37			
125	August 23	@ Athletics	2–4						87–38			
126	August 24	@ Athletics	0–9						87–39			
127	August 24	@ Athletics	8–9 (18)						87–40			
128	August 26	Pilots	1–2						87–41			
129	August 27	Pilots	7–2						88–41			
130	August 28	Pilots	4–3 (11)						89–41			
131	August 29	Angels	2–6						89–42			
132	August 29	Angels	1–2						89–43			
133	August 30	Angels	6–3						90–43			
134	August 31	Angels	5–4						91–43			

September (17–10) (Home: 9–2; Road: 8–8)

#	Date	Opponent	Score	Win	Loss	Save	Attendance	Stadium	Record	Report	Rank	GB
135	September 1	@ White Sox	8–0						92–43			
136	September 2	@ White Sox	3–10						92–44			
137	September 4	@ Tigers	5–4						93–44			
138	September 5	@ Tigers	8–4						94–44			
139	September 6	@ Tigers	4–5 (11)						94–45			
140	September 7	@ Tigers	6–5 (14)						95–45			
141	September 9	Senators	6–1						96–45			
142	September 9	Senators	3–2						97–45			
143	September 10	Red Sox	8–7						98–45			
144	September 11	Red Sox	4–2						99–45			
145	September 12	Indians	2–1						100–45			
146	September 13	Indians	10–5						101–45			
147	September 14	Indians	7–3						102–45			
148	September 15	@ Senators	2–3						102–46			
149	September 16	@ Senators	1–0						103–46			
150	September 18	@ Red Sox	6–4						104–46			
151	September 18	@ Red Sox	0–5						104–47			
152	September 19	Yankees	4–2						105–47			
153	September 20	Yankees	8–7						106–47			
154	September 23	@ Indians	1–3						106–48			
155	September 24	@ Indians	4–3 (11)						107–48			
156	September 25	@ Indians	4–1						108–48			
157	September 26	@ Yankees	2–4						108–49			
158	September 27	@ Yankees	0–1						108–50			
159	September 28	@ Yankees	2–3						108–51			
160	September 29	Tigers	1–4						108–52			
161	September 30	Tigers	3–4						108–53			

October (1–0) (Home: 1–0)

#	Date	Opponent	Score	Win	Loss	Save	Attendance	Stadium	Record	Report	Rank	GB
162	October 1	Tigers	2–1 (10)						109–53			

== Player stats ==
= Indicates team leader

=== Batting ===
==== Starters by position ====
Note: Pos = Position; G = Games played; AB = At bats; R = Runs; H = Hits; HR = Home runs; RBI = Runs batted in; Avg. = Batting average; SB = Stolen bases

Pos	Player	G	AB	R	H	Avg.	HR	RBI	SB
C	Elrod Hendricks	105	295	36	72	.244	12	38	0
1B	Boog Powell	152	533	83	162	.304	37	121	1
2B	Davey Johnson	142	511	52	143	.280	7	57	3
3B	Brooks Robinson	156	598	73	140	.234	23	84	2
SS	Mark Belanger	150	530	76	152	.287	2	50	14
LF	Don Buford	144	554	99	161	.291	11	64	19
CF	Paul Blair	150	625	102	178	.285	26	76	20
RF	Frank Robinson	148	539	111	166	.308	32	100	9

==== Other batters ====
Note: G = Games played; AB = At bats; R = Runs; H = Hits; HR = Home runs; RBI = Runs batted in; Avg. = Batting average; SB = Stolen bases

Player	G	AB	R	H	Avg.	HR	RBI	SB
Andy Etchebarren	73	217	29	54	.249	3	26	1
Merv Rettenmund	95	190	27	47	.247	4	25	6
Dave May	78	120	8	29	.242	3	10	2
Chico Salmon	52	91	18	27	.297	3	12	0
Curt Motton	56	89	15	27	.303	6	21	3
Bobby Floyd	39	84	7	17	.202	0	1	0
Clay Dalrymple	37	80	8	19	.238	3	6	0
Terry Crowley	7	18	2	6	.333	0	3	0

=== Pitching ===
==== Starting pitchers ====
Note: G = Games pitched; IP = Innings pitched; W = Wins; L = Losses; ERA = Earned run average; SO = Strikeouts

Player	G	IP	W	L	ERA	SO
Mike Cuellar	39	290.2	23	11	2.38	182
Dave McNally	41	268.2	20	7	3.22	166
Tom Phoebus	35	202.0	14	7	3.52	117
Jim Palmer	26	181.0	16	4	2.34	123

==== Other pitchers ====
Note: G = Games pitched; IP = Innings pitched; W = Wins; L = Losses; ERA = Earned run average; SO = Strikeouts

Player	G	IP	W	L	ERA	SO
Jim Hardin	30	137.2	6	7	3.60	64

==== Relief pitchers ====
Note: G = Games pitched; IP = Innings pitched; W = Wins; L = Losses; SV = Saves; ERA = Earned run average; SO = Strikeouts

Player	G	IP	W	L	SV	ERA	SO
Eddie Watt	56	71.0	5	2	16	1.65	46
Pete Richert	44	57.1	7	4	12	2.20	54
Dick Hall	39	65.2	5	2	6	1.92	31
Dave Leonhard	37	94.0	7	4	1	2.49	37
Marcelino López	27	69.1	5	3	0	4.41	57
Al Severinsen	12	19.2	1	1	0	2.29	13
Mike Adamson	6	8.0	0	1	0	4.50	2
Frank Bertaina	3	6.0	0	0	0	0.00	5
Fred Beene	2	2.2	0	0	0	0.00	0

== Postseason ==
=== ALCS ===
==== Game 1 ====
October 4, 1969, at Memorial Stadium

Team	1	2	3	4	5	6	7	8	9	10	11	12	R	H	E
Minnesota	0	0	0	0	1	0	2	0	0	0	0	0	3	4	2
Baltimore	0	0	0	1	1	0	0	0	1	0	0	1	4	10	1
W: Dick Hall (1–0) L: Ron Perranoski (0–1)
HR: MIN – Tony Oliva (1), BAL – Frank Robinson (1), Mark Belanger (1), Boog Powell (1)

==== Game 2 ====
October 5, 1969, at Memorial Stadium

Team	1	2	3	4	5	6	7	8	9	10	11	R	H	E
Minnesota	0	0	0	0	0	0	0	0	0	0	0	0	3	1
Baltimore	0	0	0	0	0	0	0	0	0	0	1	1	8	0
W: Dave McNally (1–0) L: Dave Boswell (0–1)
HR: None

==== Game 3 ====
October 6, 1969, at Metropolitan Stadium

Team	1	2	3	4	5	6	7	8	9	R	H	E
Baltimore	0	3	0	2	0	1	0	2	3	11	18	0
Minnesota	1	0	0	0	1	0	0	0	0	2	10	2
W: Jim Palmer (1–0) L: Bob Miller (0–1)
HR: BAL – Paul Blair (1)

=== 1969 World Series ===
Game	Score	Date	Location	Attendance
1	Mets – 1, Orioles – 4	October 11	Memorial Stadium	50,429
2	Mets – 2, Orioles – 1	October 12	Memorial Stadium	50,850
3	Orioles – 0, Mets – 5	October 14	Shea Stadium	56,335
4	Orioles – 1, Mets – 2 (10 innings)	October 15	Shea Stadium	57,367
5	Orioles – 3, Mets – 5	October 16	Shea Stadium	57,397

=== Game log ===
1969 Postseason Game Log
1969 American League Championship Series vs. Minnesota – Baltimore wins series 3–0

#	Date	Opponent	Score	Win	Loss	Save	Attendance	Stadium	Report	Game Time	Local TV	National TV
1	October 4	Twins										
2	October 5	Twins										
3	October 6	@ Twins										

1969 World Series vs. New York (NL) – New York (NL) wins series 4–1

#	Date	Opponent	Score	Win	Loss	Save	Attendance	Stadium	Report	Game Time	Local TV	National TV
1	October 11	Mets										
2	October 12	Mets										
3	October 14	@ Mets										
4	October 15	@ Mets										
5	October 16	@ Mets										

== Farm system ==
Level	Team	League	Manager
AAA	Rochester Red Wings	International League	Cal Ripken Sr.
AA	Dallas-Fort Worth Spurs	Texas League	Joe Altobelli
A	Stockton Ports	California League	Bill Werle
A	Miami Marlins	Florida State League	Woody Smith
A-Short Season	Aberdeen Pheasants	Northern League	Ken Rowe
Rookie	Bluefield Orioles	Appalachian League	Jackie Ferrell

LEAGUE CHAMPIONS: Stockton, Miami
