= Len Boehmer =

American baseball player (born 1941)

- Utilityman
- Born: June 28, 1941 (age 85); Flint Hill, Missouri, U.S.
- Batted: Right Threw: Right

MLB debut
- June 18, 1967, for the Cincinnati Reds

Last MLB appearance
- July 6, 1971, for the New York Yankees

MLB statistics
- Batting average: .164
- Home runs: 0
- Runs batted in: 7
- Stats at Baseball Reference

Teams
- Cincinnati Reds (1967); New York Yankees (1969, 1971)

Leonard Joseph Stephen Boehmer (/ˈbeɪmər/ BAY-mər; born June 28, 1941) is an American former Major League Baseball player who appeared in 50 games played between the 1967 and 1971 seasons for the Cincinnati Reds and New York Yankees.

Primarily a first baseman, but also a utility infielder, he was listed at 6 feet 1 inch (1.85 m) tall and 192 pounds (87 kg) and threw and batted right-handed.

Boehmer grew up in Flint Hill, Missouri, a town of about 100 residents. He attended St. Louis University and after his sophomore year, with both the Reds and Yankees showing interest in him, he signed with the Reds in 1961 for an $18,000 bonus.

He was in his seventh season in the Cincinnati farm system when he was recalled for his Major League debut on June 18, 1967. In his first at bat, as a pinch hitter for Gerry Arrigo, he grounded out against Claude Osteen of the Los Angeles Dodgers. Boehmer stayed in the game and flied out in his second MLB at bat, then again went hitless as a pinch hitter on July 2 before returning to the Triple-A Buffalo Bisons.

At the close of the 1967 minor league baseball season, he was traded to the New York Yankees for pitcher Bill Henry and Boehmer played the rest of his pro career in the Yankees organization.

After batting .268 in 144 games for the Triple-A Syracuse Chiefs in 1968, Boehmer made the Yankee roster for the entire 1969 season, where in the team's 70th game of the season, against the Boston Red Sox at Fenway Park, Boehmer earned his first major league hit (and RBI) and it was a big one—a 10th-inning single off Garry Roggenburk which scored Horace Clarke to put the Yankees ahead for good, 4-3, and Boehmer later scored on a Roy White single for the final result of 5-3.

For the season with the Yankees, he appeared in 45 games, starting 17 at first base and seven more at second base, hitting just .176 in 108 at bats. His 19 hits included four doubles.

He then spent the entire 1970 season back at Syracuse (batting .288) before returning to the Yanks for a brief, three-game stint in July 1971, going hitless in five at bats.

In his final season in pro ball, 1972, he batted .326 in 113 games with Syracuse.

For his minor league career, Boehmer batted .274 with 91 home runs in 1,196 games.

In parts of three major league seasons, he tallied 19 hits (all in 1969) in 116 at bats.

After baseball, he entered his father's plumbing supply business, where Boehmer and his brother ran Boehmer Brothers Utility Supply. After he retired, his sons Stephen and Robert became the third generation to run the business. Boehmer continues to live in his hometown of Flint Hill with his wife Alice. They have four children and twelve grandchildren.
