= American League East =

Division of Major League Baseball

- League: American League
- Sport: Major League Baseball
- Founded: 1969
- No. of teams: 5 (1994–present); 7 (1977–1993); 6 (1969–1976)
- Most recent champions: Tampa Bay Rays (2026; 5th title)
- Most titles: New York Yankees (21)

American League East Teams Location

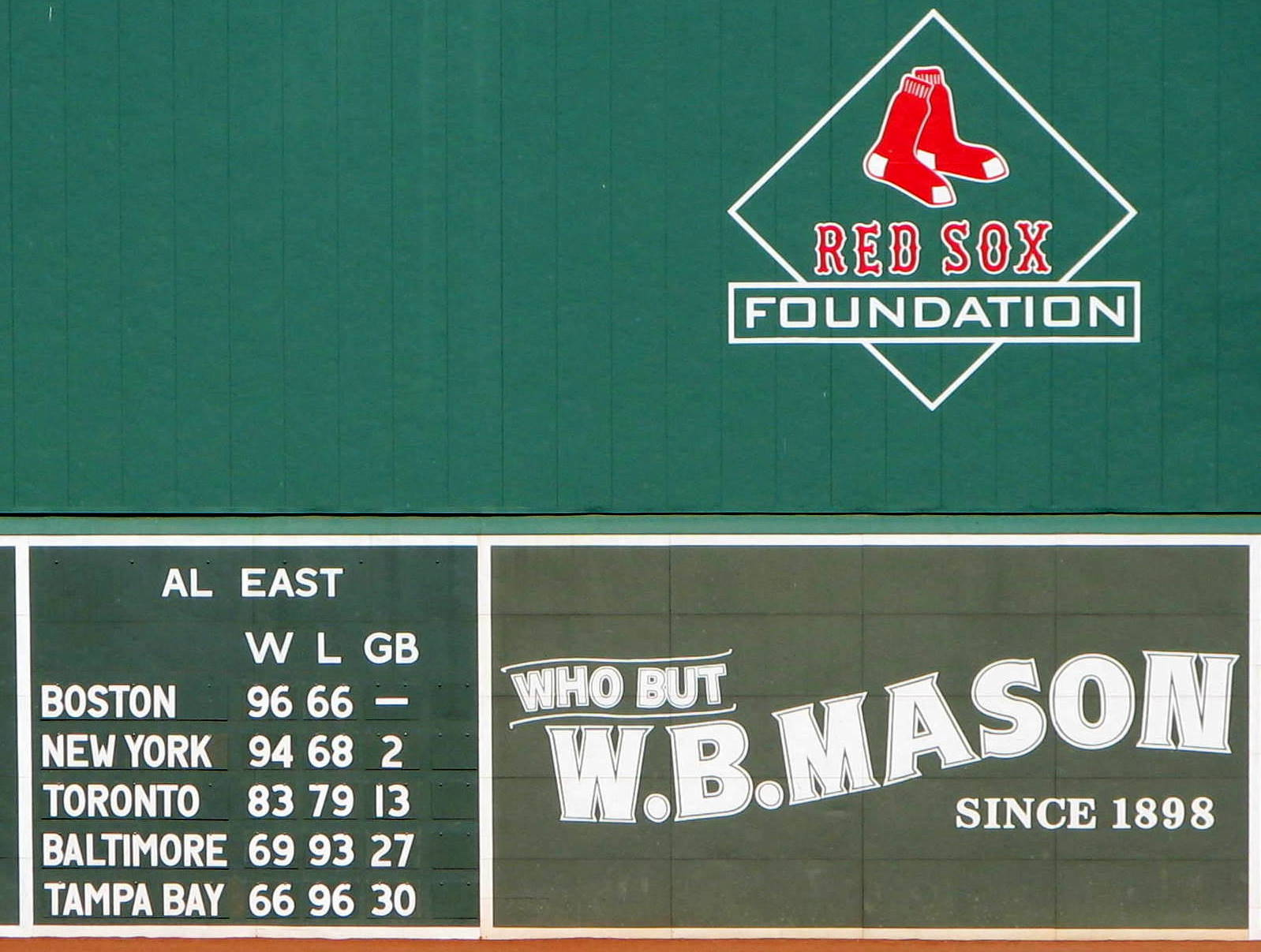
A partial view of the Green Monster at Fenway Park, with the final standings of the AL East at the conclusion of the 2007 season.

The American League East is one of Major League Baseball's six divisions. MLB consists of an East, Central, and West division for each of its two 15-team leagues, the American League (AL) and National League (NL). This division was created before the start of the 1969 season along with the American League West. Before that time, each league consisted of 10 teams without any divisions.

Four of the division's five teams are located in the Eastern United States, with the other team, the Toronto Blue Jays, in Eastern Canada. It is currently the only division that contains a non-American team. At the end of the Major League Baseball season, the team with the best record in the division earns one of the AL's six playoff spots. (Note: The three division winners, plus three wild card teams, advance to the postseason.)

== History ==
Baseball writers have long posited that the American League East is the toughest division in MLB; during its 50-year existence, an AL East team has gone on to play in the World Series 28 times, and 16 of those teams have been crowned World Series champions. Since the 1995 season, when the wild-card playoff berth was introduced, the AL East has produced 20 of the 32 wild-card teams for the American League, with the AL West sending seven teams, and only five coming from the AL Central.

When MLB split into divisions for the 1969 season, the American League, unlike the National League, split its 12 teams strictly on geography. The six teams then located in the Eastern Time Zone were all placed in the AL East, with the other six teams making up the AL West.

=== Realignment of 1972 ===
In September 1971, American League owners approved the move of the second Washington Senators franchise to Arlington, Texas, to become the Texas Rangers. With the Rangers moving to the AL West, the owners then debated whether the Chicago White Sox or Milwaukee Brewers should move to the AL East for 1972. The White Sox requested they be moved to the East under the argument of being an original AL franchise and playing most of their longtime rival teams, of which five were in the East.

The Oakland Athletics (formerly from Kansas City and Philadelphia) objected to moving the White Sox to the East; owner Charlie Finley was a Chicago native who wanted to continue to make three trips per season with his club to the Second City. The Minnesota Twins went a step further and objected to switching either the White Sox or Brewers out of fear of losing their closest geographic rivals and the Twins, citing the National League's lack of geographic accuracy (which placed the Atlanta Braves in the NL West) in forming its divisions as a reason why the Rangers should not have been shifted out of the East. The Twins also argued that the National Football League's Dallas Cowboys played (and still do play) in the NFC East despite being far from the Northeast.

The White Sox' pleas notwithstanding, the Brewers, who began as the Seattle Pilots in 1969 and had to endure long divisional road trips to Oakland and Anaheim (and vice-versa) in the AL West, were moved to the AL East.

== Division membership ==
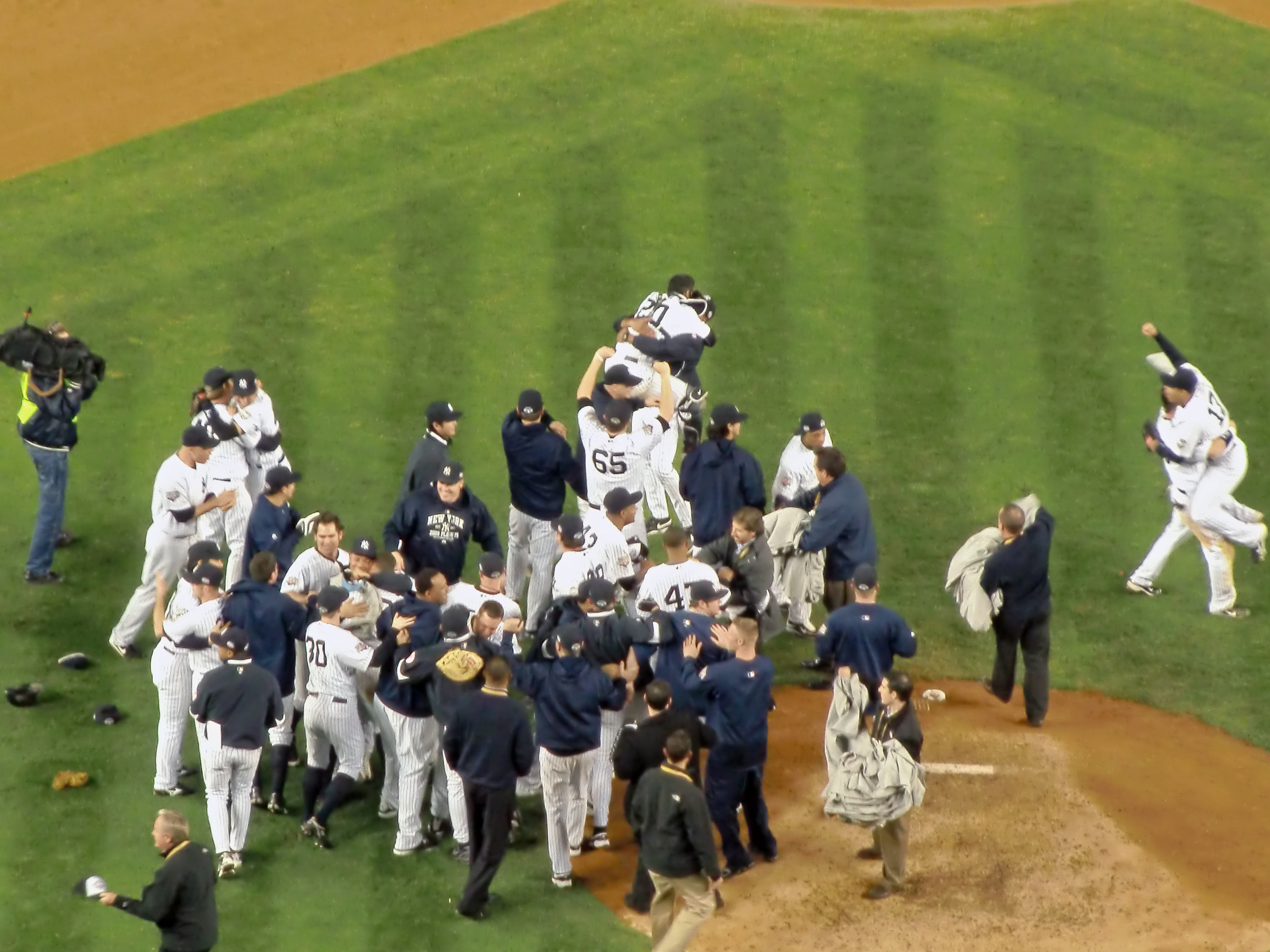
The New York Yankees celebrating their 2009 World Series championship

=== Current members ===
- Baltimore Orioles – Founding member
- Boston Red Sox – Founding member
- New York Yankees – Founding member
- Tampa Bay Rays – Joined in 1998 as an expansion team. Known as the Tampa Bay Devil Rays before 2008
- Toronto Blue Jays – Joined in 1977 as an expansion team.

=== Former members ===
- Cleveland Indians, founding member, moved to the newly created AL Central in 1994
- Detroit Tigers, founding member, moved to the AL Central in 1998 to make room for the expansion Tampa Bay Devil Rays
- Milwaukee Brewers, joined from the AL West in 1972 to replace the Texas Rangers, moved to the newly created AL Central in 1994
- Washington Senators, founding member, moved to the AL West as the Texas Rangers in 1972

=== Membership timeline ===
AL East Division^{[A]}
Years
69	70	71	72	73	74	75	76	77	78	79	80	81	82	83	84	85	86	87	88
Baltimore Orioles
Boston Red Sox
Cleveland Indians
Detroit Tigers
New York Yankees
Washington; Senators^{[B]}																			
			Milwaukee Brewers^{[B]}																
								Toronto Blue Jays^{[C]}											
AL East Division^{[A]}
Years
89	90	91	92	93	94	95	96	97	98	99	00	01	02	03	04	05	06	07	08
Baltimore Orioles
Boston Red Sox
Cleveland Indians^{[D]}																			
Detroit Tigers^{[E]}																			
New York Yankees
Milwaukee Brewers^{[D]}																			
Toronto Blue Jays
									Tampa Bay Devil Rays^{[E]}										TB; Rays^{[F]}
AL East Division^{[A]}
Years
09	10	11	12	13	14	15	16	17	18	19	20	21	22	23	24	25	26	27	
Baltimore Orioles
Boston Red Sox
New York Yankees
Toronto Blue Jays
Tampa Bay Rays
Team not in division Division Won World Series Division Won AL Championship

^{A} AL East was formed with six teams due to the 1969 expansion, as the AL grew from 10 teams to 12.
^{B} Following the 1971 season, the Washington Senators franchise relocated and became the Texas Rangers of the AL West; the Milwaukee Brewers moved to the AL East to maintain an equal number of teams in each division.
^{C} The Toronto Blue Jays were added in the 1977 expansion, becoming the seventh team of the AL East.
^{D} As part of the 1994 realignment, Cleveland and Milwaukee were moved to the newly created AL Central, reducing the AL East to five teams.
^{E} The Tampa Bay Devil Rays were added in the 1998 expansion while Detroit moved to the AL Central, maintaining the AL East at five teams.
^{F} Entering the 2008 season, Tampa Bay's team name changed from Devil Rays to Rays.

== Champions by year ==
- Team names link to the season in which each team played

Year	Winner	Record	%	Playoff Results
1969	Baltimore Orioles (1)	109–53	.673	Won ALCS (Twins) 3–0; Lost World Series (Mets) 4–1
1970	Baltimore Orioles (2)	108–54	.667	Won ALCS (Twins) 3–0; Won World Series (Reds) 4–1
1971	Baltimore Orioles (3)	101–57	.639	Won ALCS (Athletics) 3–0; Lost World Series (Pirates) 4–3
1972	Detroit Tigers (1)	86–70	.551	Lost ALCS (Athletics) 3–2
1973	Baltimore Orioles (4)	97–65	.599	Lost ALCS (Athletics) 3–2
1974	Baltimore Orioles (5)	91–71	.562	Lost ALCS (Athletics) 3–1
1975	Boston Red Sox (1)	95–65	.594	Won ALCS (Athletics) 3–0; Lost World Series (Reds) 4–3
1976	New York Yankees (1)	97–62	.610	Won ALCS (Royals) 3–2; Lost World Series (Reds) 4–0
1977	New York Yankees (2)	100–62	.617	Won ALCS (Royals) 3–2; Won World Series (Dodgers) 4–2
1978	New York Yankees (3)*	100–63	.613	Won ALCS (Royals) 3–1; Won World Series (Dodgers) 4–2
1979	Baltimore Orioles (6)	102–57	.642	Won ALCS (Angels) 3–1; Lost World Series (Pirates) 4–3
1980	New York Yankees (4)	103–59	.636	Lost ALCS (Royals) 3–0
1981†	New York Yankees (5)	59–48	.551	Won ALDS (Brewers) 3–2; Won ALCS (Athletics) 3–0; Lost World Series (Dodgers) 4–2
1982	Milwaukee Brewers (1)	95–67	.586	Won ALCS (Angels) 3–2; Lost World Series (Cardinals) 4–3
1983	Baltimore Orioles (7)	98–64	.605	Won ALCS (White Sox) 3–1; Won World Series (Phillies) 4–1
1984	Detroit Tigers (2)	104–58	.642	Won ALCS (Royals) 3–0; Won World Series (Padres) 4–1
1985	Toronto Blue Jays (1)	99–62	.615	Lost ALCS (Royals) 4–3
1986	Boston Red Sox (2)	95–66	.590	Won ALCS (Angels) 4–3; Lost World Series (Mets) 4–3
1987	Detroit Tigers (3)	98–64	.605	Lost ALCS (Twins) 4–1
1988	Boston Red Sox (3)	89–73	.549	Lost ALCS (Athletics) 4–0
1989	Toronto Blue Jays (2)	89–73	.549	Lost ALCS (Athletics) 4–1
1990	Boston Red Sox (4)	88–74	.543	Lost ALCS (Athletics) 4–0
1991	Toronto Blue Jays (3)	91–71	.562	Lost ALCS (Twins) 4–1
1992	Toronto Blue Jays (4)	96–66	.593	Won ALCS (Athletics) 4–2; Won World Series (Braves) 4–2
1993	Toronto Blue Jays (5)	95–67	.586	Won ALCS (White Sox) 4–2; Won World Series (Phillies) 4–2
1994††	No playoffs due 1994–95 Major League Baseball strike			
1995	Boston Red Sox (5)	86–58	.597	Lost ALDS (Indians) 3–0
1996	New York Yankees (6)	92–70	.568	Won ALDS (Rangers) 3–1; Won ALCS (Orioles) 4–1; Won World Series (Braves) 4–2
1997	Baltimore Orioles (8)	98–64	.605	Won ALDS (Mariners) 3–1; Lost ALCS (Indians) 4–2
1998	New York Yankees (7)	114–48	.704	Won ALDS (Rangers) 3–0; Won ALCS (Indians) 4–2; Won World Series (Padres) 4–0
1999	New York Yankees (8)	98–64	.605	Won ALDS (Rangers) 3–0; Won ALCS (Red Sox) 4–1; Won World Series (Braves) 4–0
2000	New York Yankees (9)	87–74	.540	Won ALDS (Athletics) 3–2; Won ALCS (Mariners) 4–2; Won World Series (Mets) 4–1
2001	New York Yankees (10)	95–65	.594	Won ALDS (Athletics) 3–2; Won ALCS (Mariners) 4–1; Lost World Series (Diamondbacks) 4–3
2002	New York Yankees (11)	103–58	.640	Lost ALDS (Angels) 3–1
2003	New York Yankees (12)	101–61	.623	Won ALDS (Twins) 3–1; Won ALCS (Red Sox) 4–3; Lost World Series (Marlins) 4–2
2004	New York Yankees (13)	101–61	.623	Won ALDS (Twins) 3–1; Lost ALCS (Red Sox) 4–3
2005	New York Yankees (14)+	95–67	.586	Lost ALDS (Angels) 3–2
2006	New York Yankees (15)	97–65	.599	Lost ALDS (Tigers) 3–1
2007	Boston Red Sox (6)	96–66	.593	Won ALDS (Angels) 3–0; Won ALCS (Indians) 4–3; Won World Series (Rockies) 4–0
2008	Tampa Bay Rays (1)	97–65	.599	Won ALDS (White Sox) 3–1; Won ALCS (Red Sox) 4–3; Lost World Series (Phillies) 4–1
2009	New York Yankees (16)	103–59	.636	Won ALDS (Twins) 3–0; Won ALCS (Angels) 4–2; Won World Series (Phillies) 4–2
2010	Tampa Bay Rays (2)	96–66	.593	Lost ALDS (Rangers) 3–2
2011	New York Yankees (17)	97–65	.599	Lost ALDS (Tigers) 3–2
2012	New York Yankees (18)	95–67	.586	Won ALDS (Orioles) 3–2; Lost ALCS (Tigers) 4–0
2013	Boston Red Sox (7)	97–65	.599	Won ALDS (Rays) 3–1; Won ALCS (Tigers) 4–2; Won World Series (Cardinals) 4–2
2014	Baltimore Orioles (9)	96–66	.593	Won ALDS (Tigers) 3–0; Lost ALCS (Royals) 4–0
2015	Toronto Blue Jays (6)	93–69	.574	Won ALDS (Rangers) 3–2; Lost ALCS (Royals) 4–2
2016	Boston Red Sox (8)	93–69	.574	Lost ALDS (Indians) 3–0
2017	Boston Red Sox (9)	93–69	.574	Lost ALDS (Astros) 3–1
2018	Boston Red Sox (10)	108–54	.667	Won ALDS (Yankees) 3–1; Won ALCS (Astros) 4–1; Won World Series (Dodgers) 4–1
2019	New York Yankees (19)	103–59	.636	Won ALDS (Twins) 3–0; Lost ALCS (Astros) 4–2
2020†††	Tampa Bay Rays (3)	40–20	.667	Won ALWC (Blue Jays) 2–0; Won ALDS (Yankees) 3–2; Won ALCS (Astros) 4–3; Lost World Series (Dodgers) 4–2
2021	Tampa Bay Rays (4)	100–62	.617	Lost ALDS (Red Sox) 3–1
2022	New York Yankees (20)	99–63	.611	Won ALDS (Guardians) 3–2; Lost ALCS (Astros) 4–0
2023	Baltimore Orioles (10)	101–61	.623	Lost ALDS (Rangers) 3–0
2024	New York Yankees (21)	94–68	.580	Won ALDS (Royals) 3–1; Won ALCS (Guardians) 4–1; Lost World Series (Dodgers) 4–1
2025	Toronto Blue Jays (7)++	94–68	.580	Won ALDS (Yankees) 3–1; Won ALCS (Mariners) 4–3; Lost World Series (Dodgers) 4–3
2026	Tampa Bay Rays (5)	98–64	.605	Won ALDS (Yankees) 3–0; Won ALCS (Guardians) 4–2; Lost World Series (Brewers) 4–1

* – The Yankees and Red Sox finished with exact records, tied for the division championship; the Yankees won a one-game tie-breaker.

† – Due to the 1981 Major League Baseball strike, the season was split. The Yankees won the first half and defeated the second-half champion Brewers (62–45) in the postseason.

†† – Due to the 1994–95 Major League Baseball strike starting August 12, the season was not played to completion. The Yankees were leading at the time of the strike.

+ – The Red Sox and Yankees finished tied for first place with identical records. The Yankees were declared division winners, due to having won the season series against the Red Sox, and the Red Sox received the wild card berth. (Note: Had a team from another division been the wild card, a one-game tie-breaker would have been played between the Yankees and Red Sox to decide the division champion.)

††† – Due to the COVID-19 pandemic, the 2020 season was shortened to 60 games. By virtue of an expanded eight-team postseason format, the division runner-up Yankees also qualified for the playoffs.

++ – The Blue Jays and Yankees finished tied for first place with identical records. The Blue Jays were declared division winners, due to having won the season series against the Yankees, and the Yankees received the first wild card berth.

== Other postseason teams ==
Since the advent of the Wild Card, AL East teams have faced each other in the ALCS 5 times, the ALDS 4 times, and the Wild Card twice.

See List of American League Wild Card winners (since 1994)

Year	Winner	Record	%	GB	Playoff Results
1995	New York Yankees	79–65	.549	7	Lost ALDS (Mariners) 3–2
1996	Baltimore Orioles	88–74	.543	4	Won ALDS (Indians) 3–1; Lost ALCS (Yankees) 4–1
1997	New York Yankees	96–66	.593	2	Lost ALDS (Indians) 3–2
1998	Boston Red Sox	92–70	.568	22	Lost ALDS (Indians) 3–1
1999	Boston Red Sox	94–68	.580	4	Won ALDS (Indians) 3–2; Lost ALCS (Yankees) 4–1
2003	Boston Red Sox	95–67	.586	6	Won ALDS (Athletics) 3–2; Lost ALCS (Yankees) 4–3
2004	Boston Red Sox	98–64	.605	3	Won ALDS (Angels) 3–0; Won ALCS (Yankees) 4–3; Won World Series (Cardinals) 4–0
2005	Boston Red Sox	95–67	.586	0	Lost ALDS (White Sox) 3–0
2007	New York Yankees	94–68	.580	2	Lost ALDS (Indians) 3–1
2008	Boston Red Sox	95–67	.586	2	Won ALDS (Angels) 3–1; Lost ALCS (Rays) 4–3
2009	Boston Red Sox	95–67	.586	8	Lost ALDS (Angels) 3–0
2010	New York Yankees	95–67	.586	1	Won ALDS (Twins) 3–0; Lost ALCS (Rangers) 4–2
2011	Tampa Bay Rays	91–71	.562	6	Lost ALDS (Rangers) 3–1
2012*	Baltimore Orioles	93–69	.574	2	Won ALWC (Rangers); Lost ALDS (Yankees) 3–2
2013	Tampa Bay Rays**	92–71	.564	5½	Won ALWC (Indians); Lost ALDS (Red Sox) 3–1
2015	New York Yankees	87–75	.537	6	Lost ALWC (Astros)
2016	Toronto Blue Jays***	89–73	.549	4	Won ALWC (Orioles); Won ALDS (Rangers) 3–0; Lost ALCS (Indians) 4–1
2016	Baltimore Orioles***	89–73	.549	4	Lost ALWC (Blue Jays)
2017	New York Yankees	91–71	.562	2	Won ALWC (Twins); Won ALDS (Indians) 3–2; Lost ALCS (Astros) 4–3
2018	New York Yankees	100–62	.617	8	Won ALWC (Athletics); Lost ALDS (Red Sox) 3–1
2019	Tampa Bay Rays	96–66	.593	7	Won ALWC (Athletics); Lost ALDS (Astros) 3–2
2020****	New York Yankees	33–27	.550	7	Won ALWC (Indians) 2–0; Lost ALDS (Rays) 3–2
2020****	Toronto Blue Jays	32–28	.533	8	Lost ALWC (Rays) 2–0
2021	Boston Red Sox*****	92–70	.568	12	Won ALWC (Yankees); Won ALDS (Rays) 3–1; Lost ALCS (Astros) 4–2
2021	New York Yankees*****	92–70	.568	12	Lost ALWC (Red Sox)
2022	Toronto Blue Jays	92–70	.568	7	Lost ALWC (Mariners) 2–0
2022	Tampa Bay Rays	86–76	.531	13	Lost ALWC (Guardians) 2–0
2023	Tampa Bay Rays	99–63	.611	2	Lost ALWC (Rangers) 2–0
2023	Toronto Blue Jays	89–73	.549	12	Lost ALWC (Twins) 2–0
2024	Baltimore Orioles	91–71	.562	3	Lost ALWC (Royals) 2–0
2025	New York Yankees******	94–68	.568	0	Won ALWC (Red Sox) 2–1; Lost ALDS (Blue Jays) 3–1
2025	Boston Red Sox	89–73	.549	5	Lost ALWC (Yankees) 2–1
2026	New York Yankees	93–68	.578	4.5	Won ALWC (Red Sox) 2–0; Lost ALDS (Rays) 3–0
2026	Boston Red Sox	87–75	.537	11	Lost ALWC (Yankees) 2–0

* – From 2012 to 2019, and in 2021, the Wild Card was expanded to two teams. Those teams faced each other in the Wild Card Game to determine the final participant in the American League Division Series. In 2020 only, eight teams, including the three division winners, played in a best-of-three Wild Card Series, with the winners advancing to the Division Series. Starting in 2022, the Wild Card field was increased to three teams, and along with the lowest-ranked division winner, qualified for the best-of-three Wild Card Series to determine the remaining two slots in the Division Series.

** In 2013, the Texas Rangers and the Tampa Bay Rays finished the season with the identical records of 91–71. A one-game playoff was held and the Rays won it 5–2 over the Rangers to capture the second Wild Card berth.

*** In 2016, the Toronto Blue Jays and the Baltimore Orioles finished the season with the identical records of 89–73. However, the Blue Jays won the right to host the Wild Card Game by virtue of their 10–9 regular-season record against the Orioles.

**** Due to the COVID-19 pandemic, the season was shortened to 60 games.

***** In 2021, the Boston Red Sox and the New York Yankees finished the season with the identical records of 92–70. However, the Red Sox won the right to host the Wild Card Game by virtue of their 10–9 regular-season record against the Yankees.

Beginning in 2022, the postseason has expanded to three division leaders and three wild cards per league.

****** In 2025, the Toronto Blue Jays and the New York Yankees finished the season with the identical records of 94–68. However, the Blue Jays clinched the American League East division title by winning the season series 8–5, relegating the Yankees to the first wild-card spot.

== Season results ==
^{(#)}	Denotes team that won the World Series
^{(#)}	Denotes team that won the American League pennant, but lost World Series
^{(#)}	Denotes team that qualified for the MLB postseason

Season	Team (record)						
Season	1st	2nd	3rd	4th	5th	6th	7th
1969: The American League East was formed with six inaugural members: the Baltimore Orioles, Boston Red Sox, Cleveland Indians, Detroit Tigers, New York Yankees and Washington Senators.
1969	Baltimore (109–53)	Detroit (90–72)	Boston (87–75)	Washington (86–76)	N.Y. Yankees (80–81)	Cleveland (62–99)	
1970	Baltimore (108–54)	N.Y. Yankees (93–69)	Boston (87–75)	Detroit (79–83)	Cleveland (76–86)	Washington (70–92)	
1971	Baltimore (101–57)	Detroit (91–71)	Boston (85–77)	N.Y. Yankees (82–80)	Washington (63–96)	Cleveland (60–102)	
1972: The Washington Senators relocated to Arlington, Texas as the Texas Rangers and left to join the American League West. The Milwaukee Brewers joined from the American League West.
1972	Detroit (86–70)	Boston (85–70)	Baltimore (80–74)	N.Y. Yankees (79–76)	Cleveland (72–84)	Milwaukee (65–91)	
1973	Baltimore (97–65)	Boston (89–73)	Detroit (85–77)	N.Y. Yankees (80–82)	Milwaukee (74–88)	Cleveland (71–91)	
1974	Baltimore (91–71)	N.Y. Yankees (89–73)	Boston (84–78)	Cleveland (77–85)	Milwaukee (76–86)	Detroit (72–90)	
1975	Boston (95–65)	Baltimore (90–69)	N.Y. Yankees (83–77)	Cleveland (79–80)	Milwaukee (68–94)	Detroit (57–102)	
1976	N.Y. Yankees (97–62)	Baltimore (88–74)	Boston (83–79)	Cleveland (81–78)	Detroit (74–87)	Milwaukee (66–95)	
1977: An expansion team, Toronto Blue Jays, joined the division.
1977	N.Y. Yankees (100–62)	Baltimore (97–64)	Boston (97–64)	Detroit (74–88)	Cleveland (71–90)	Milwaukee (67–95)	Toronto (54–107)
1978	N.Y. Yankees^{[a]} (100–63)	Boston (99–64)	Milwaukee (93–69)	Baltimore (90–71)	Detroit (86–76)	Cleveland (69–90)	Toronto (59–102)
1979	Baltimore (102–57)	Milwaukee (95–66)	Boston (91–69)	N.Y. Yankees (89–71)	Detroit (85–76)	Cleveland (81–80)	Toronto (53–109)
1980	N.Y. Yankees (103–59)	Baltimore (100–62)	Milwaukee (86–76)	Detroit (84–78)	Boston (83–77)	Cleveland (79–81)	Toronto (67–95)
1981: Due to the player's strike, the season was split and a Division Series was created to pit the first and second half champions from each division. The New York Yankees won the first half and the Milwaukee Brewers won the second half. The Yankees won the ALDS 3–2 to claim the American League East championship.
1981	Milwaukee (62–47)	Baltimore (59–46)	N.Y. Yankees (59–48)	Detroit (60–49)	Boston (59–49)	Cleveland (52–51)	Toronto (37–69)
1982	Milwaukee (95–67)	Baltimore (94–68)	Boston (89–73)	Detroit (83–79)	N.Y. Yankees (79–83)	Cleveland (78–84)	Toronto (78–84)
1983	Baltimore (98–64)	Detroit (92–70)	N.Y. Yankees (91–71)	Toronto (89–73)	Milwaukee (87–75)	Boston (78–84)	Cleveland (70–92)
1984	Detroit (104–58)	Toronto (89–73)	N.Y. Yankees (87–75)	Boston (86–76)	Baltimore (85–77)	Cleveland (75–87)	Milwaukee (67–94)
1985	Toronto (99–62)	N.Y. Yankees (97–64)	Detroit (84–77)	Baltimore (83–78)	Boston (81–81)	Milwaukee (71–90)	Cleveland (60–102)
1986	Boston (95–66)	N.Y. Yankees (90–72)	Detroit (87–75)	Toronto (86–76)	Cleveland (84–78)	Milwaukee (77–84)	Baltimore (73–89)
1987	Detroit (98–64)	Toronto (96–66)	Milwaukee (91–71)	N.Y. Yankees (89–73)	Boston (78–84)	Baltimore (67–95)	Cleveland (61–101)
1988	Boston (89–73)	Detroit (88–74)	Milwaukee (87–75)	Toronto (87–75)	N.Y. Yankees (85–76)	Cleveland (78–84)	Baltimore (54–107)
1989	Toronto (89–73)	Baltimore (87–75)	Boston (83–79)	Milwaukee (81–81)	N.Y. Yankees (74–87)	Cleveland (73–89)	Detroit (59–103)
1990	Boston (88–74)	Toronto (86–76)	Detroit (79–83)	Cleveland (77–85)	Baltimore (76–85)	Milwaukee (74–88)	N.Y. Yankees (67–95)
1991	Toronto (91–71)	Boston (84–78)	Detroit (84–78)	Milwaukee (83–79)	N.Y. Yankees (71–91)	Baltimore (67–95)	Cleveland (57–105)
1992	Toronto (96–66)	Milwaukee (92–70)	Baltimore (89–73)	Cleveland (76–86)	N.Y. Yankees (76–86)	Detroit (75–87)	Boston (73–89)
1993	Toronto (95–67)	N.Y. Yankees (88–74)	Baltimore (85–77)	Detroit (85–77)	Boston (80–82)	Cleveland (76–86)	Milwaukee (69–93)
1994: The Cleveland Indians and Milwaukee Brewers left to join the American League Central. Due to the player's strike, the remainder of the season was cancelled on August 12. The postseason and World Series was also cancelled.
1994	N.Y. Yankees (70–43)	Baltimore (63–49)	Toronto (55–60)	Boston (54–61)	Detroit (53–62)		
1995	^{(2)} Boston (86–58)	^{(4)} N.Y. Yankees (79–65)	Baltimore (71–73)	Detroit (60–84)	Toronto (56–88)		
1996	^{(2)} N.Y. Yankees (92–70)	^{(4)} Baltimore (88–74)	Boston (85–77)	Toronto (74–88)	Detroit (53–109)		
1997	^{(1)} Baltimore (98–64)	^{(4)} N.Y. Yankees (96–66)	Detroit (79–83)	Boston (78–84)	Toronto (76–86)		
1998: The Detroit Tigers left to join the American League Central. The Tampa Bay Devil Rays joined as an expansion franchise.
1998	^{(1)} N.Y. Yankees (114–48)	^{(4)} Boston (92–70)	Toronto (88–74)	Baltimore (79–83)	Tampa Bay (63–99)		
1999	^{(1)} N.Y. Yankees (98–64)	^{(4)} Boston (94–68)	Toronto (84–78)	Baltimore (78–84)	Tampa Bay (69–93)		
2000	^{(3)} N.Y. Yankees (87–74)	Boston (85–77)	Toronto (83–79)	Baltimore (74–88)	Tampa Bay (69–92)		
2001	^{(2)} N.Y. Yankees (95–65)	Boston (82–79)	Toronto (80–82)	Baltimore (63–98)	Tampa Bay (62–100)		
2002	^{(1)} N.Y. Yankees (103–58)	Boston (93–69)	Toronto (78–84)	Baltimore (67–95)	Tampa Bay (55–106)		
2003	^{(1)} N.Y. Yankees (101–61)	^{(4)} Boston (95–67)	Toronto (86–76)	Baltimore (71–91)	Tampa Bay (63–99)		
2004	^{(1)} N.Y. Yankees (101–61)	^{(4)} Boston (98–64)	Baltimore (78–84)	Tampa Bay (70–91)	Toronto (67–94)		
2005	^{(3)} N.Y. Yankees^{[b]} (95–67)	^{(4)} Boston (95–67)	Toronto (80–82)	Baltimore (74–88)	Tampa Bay (67–95)		
2006	^{(1)} N.Y. Yankees (97–65)	Toronto (87–75)	Boston (86–76)	Baltimore (70–92)	Tampa Bay (61–101)		
2007	^{(1)} Boston^{[c]} (96–66)	^{(4)} N.Y. Yankees (94–68)	Toronto (83–79)	Baltimore (69–93)	Tampa Bay (66–96)		
2008: The Tampa Bay Devil Rays rebranded as the Tampa Bay Rays.
2008	^{(2)} Tampa Bay (97–65)	^{(4)} Boston (95–67)	N.Y. Yankees (89–73)	Toronto (86–76)	Baltimore (68–93)		
2009	^{(1)} N.Y. Yankees (103–59)	^{(4)} Boston (95–67)	Tampa Bay (84–78)	Toronto (75–87)	Baltimore (64–98)		
2010	^{(1)} Tampa Bay (96–66)	^{(4)} N.Y. Yankees (95–67)	Boston (89–73)	Toronto (85–77)	Baltimore (66–96)		
2011	^{(1)} N.Y. Yankees (97–65)	^{(4)} Tampa Bay (91–71)	Boston (90–72)	Toronto (81–81)	Baltimore (69–93)		
2012	^{(1)} N.Y. Yankees (95–67)	^{(5)} Baltimore (93–69)	Tampa Bay (90–72)	Toronto (73–89)	Boston (69–93)		
2013	^{(1)} Boston (97–65)	^{(5)} Tampa Bay^{[d]} (92–71)	N.Y. Yankees (85–77)	Baltimore (85–77)	Toronto (74–88)		
2014	^{(2)} Baltimore (96–66)	N.Y. Yankees (84–78)	Toronto (83–79)	Tampa Bay (77–85)	Boston (71–91)		
2015	^{(2)} Toronto (93–69)	^{(4)} N.Y. Yankees (87–75)	Baltimore (81–81)	Tampa Bay (80–82)	Boston (78–84)		
2016	^{(3)} Boston (93–69)	^{(4)} Toronto^{[e]} (89–73)	^{(5)} Baltimore (89–73)	N.Y. Yankees (84–78)	Tampa Bay (68–94)		
2017	^{(3)} Boston (93–69)	^{(4)} N.Y. Yankees (91–71)	Tampa Bay (80–82)	Toronto (76–86)	Baltimore (75–87)		
2018	^{(1)} Boston (108–54)	^{(4)} N.Y. Yankees (100–62)	Tampa Bay (90–72)	Toronto (73–89)	Baltimore (47–115)		
2019	^{(2)} N.Y. Yankees (103–59)	^{(4)} Tampa Bay (96–66)	Boston (84–78)	Toronto (67–95)	Baltimore (54–108)		
2020: Due to the COVID-19 pandemic, the season was shortened to 60 games. The postseason field was expanded to eight teams and the wild-card round became a best-of-three series.
2020	^{(1)} Tampa Bay (40–20)	^{(5)} N.Y. Yankees (33–27)	^{(8)} Toronto (32–28)	Baltimore (25–35)	Boston (24–36)		
2021	^{(1)} Tampa Bay (100–62)	^{(4)} Boston (92–70) ^{[f]}	^{(5)} N.Y. Yankees (92–70)	Toronto (91–71)	Baltimore (52–110)		
2022	^{(2)} N.Y. Yankees (99–63)	^{(4)} Toronto (92–70)	^{(6)} Tampa Bay (86–76)	Baltimore (83–79)	Boston (78–84)		
2023	^{(1)} Baltimore (101–61)	^{(4)} Tampa Bay (99–63)	^{(6)} Toronto (89–73)	N.Y. Yankees (82–80)	Boston (78–84)		
2024	^{(1)} N.Y. Yankees (94–68)	^{(4)} Baltimore (91–71)	Boston (81–81)	Tampa Bay (80–82)	Toronto (74–88)		
2025	^{(1)} Toronto (94–68) ^{[g]}	^{(4)} N.Y. Yankees (94–68)	^{(5)} Boston (89–73)	Tampa Bay (77–85)	Baltimore (75–87)		
2026	^{(1)} Tampa Bay (98–64)	^{(4)} N.Y. Yankees (93–68)	^{(5)} Boston (87–75)	Baltimore (79–82)	Toronto (79–83)		

Notes and tiebreakers

- ^{a} New York and Boston were tied for the division championship and played in a tie-breaker game. The Yankees won 5–4 to claim the division crown.
- ^{b} New York and Boston were tied for the division championship and wild-card berth, but the Yankees claimed the division crown by winning the season series 10–9, relegating Boston to the wild-card spot. New York and Los Angeles Angels of the American League West were also tied for the second and third seed, but the Yankees were relegated to the third seed by losing the season series 6–4.
- ^{c} Boston and Cleveland of the American League Central were tied for the first and second seed, but the Red Sox claimed the top overall seed by winning the season series 5–2, relegating Cleveland to the second seed.
- ^{d} Tampa Bay and Texas of the American League West were tied for the second wild-card berth and played in a tie-breaker game. The Rays won 5–2 to claim the second wild-card spot.
- ^{e} Toronto and Baltimore were tied for both wild-card berths, but the Blue Jays claimed the first wild-card spot by winning the season series 10–9, relegating Baltimore to the second wild-card spot.
- ^{f} Boston and New York both finished with identical records, but the Red Sox claimed the first wild-card spot by winning the season series 10–9, relegating the Yankees to the second wild-card spot.
- ^{g} Toronto and New York were tied for the division championship, but the Blue Jays claimed the division crown by winning the season series 8–5, relegating the Yankees to the first wild-card spot.

== AL East statistics ==
Team	Division championships			Postseason records (Note: Reflects postseason record of each team only during the team's time as a member of the AL East)				
Team	Number	Year(s)	Most recent	Wild Card (Note: Number of times qualifying as a wild card team)	ALWC	ALDS	ALCS	World Series
Current Teams in Division
New York Yankees	21	1976–1977, 1978*, 1980–1981, 1996, 1998–2006, 2009, 2011–2012, 2019, 2022, 2024	2024	8	4–2	15–9	12–7	7–5
Baltimore Orioles	10	1969–1971, 1973–1974, 1979, 1983, 1997, 2014, 2023	2023	3	1–2	3–2	5–5	2–3
Boston Red Sox	10	1975, 1986, 1988, 1990, 1995, 2007, 2013, 2016–2018	2018	9	1–1	8–6	6–6	4–2
Toronto Blue Jays	7	1985, 1989, 1991–1993, 2015, 2025	2025	4	1–3	3–0	3–5	2–1
Tampa Bay Rays (Note: Formerly known as Tampa Bay Devil Rays)	5	2008, 2010, 2020–2021, 2026	2026	5	3–2	2–5	2–0	0–2
Former Teams in Division
Detroit Tigers§	3	1972, 1984, 1987	1987	—	—	0–0	1–2	1–0
Milwaukee Brewers#	1	1982	1982	—	—	0–1	1–0	0–1
Cleveland Indians†	0	—	—	—	—	0–0	0–0	0–0
Washington Senators^	0	—	—	—	—	—	0–0	0–0
Total	55	1969–1993, 1995–present	2024	28	9‍–‍9	31‍–‍23	30‍–‍25	16‍–‍14

* – Won division via tiebreaker
^ indicates no longer in division since 1972
† indicates no longer in division since 1994
# indicates no longer in division since 1994, and no longer part of AL since 1998
§ indicates no longer in division since 1998

Totals updated through conclusion of the 2024 postseason.

== Rivalries ==
- Rays–Red Sox rivalry
- Red Sox–Yankees rivalry

== See also ==
- American League Central
- American League West
- National League East
- National League Central
- National League West
