= Bob Reed (baseball) =

American baseball player (born 1945)

- Pitcher
- Born: January 12, 1945 (age 81); Boston, Massachusetts, U.S.
- Batted: Right Threw: Right

MLB debut
- September 5, 1969, for the Detroit Tigers

Last MLB appearance
- September 30, 1970, for the Detroit Tigers

MLB statistics
- Win–loss record: 2–4
- Earned run average: 4.13
- Strikeouts: 35
- Stats at Baseball Reference

Teams
- Detroit Tigers (1969–1970)

Robert Edward Reed (born January 12, 1945) is an American former Major League Baseball pitcher. Reed played for the Detroit Tigers from 1969 to 1970.
