= Jerry Dior =

American graphic designer (1932–2015)

Dior

Jerry Nicholas Dior (May 14, 1932 – May 10, 2015) was an American graphic designer, best known for creating the Major League Baseball logo.

== Early life ==
Dior was born in Brooklyn, New York and attended Abraham Lincoln High School. He then earned a scholarship to the Art Students League of New York and later graduated from the Pratt Institute. Dior served in the army during the Korean War, and was stationed in the U.S.

== Major League Baseball logo ==
Comic illustrator James Sherman formerly claimed to have designed the Major League Baseball logo, but retracted his claims in November 2008, a few weeks after the Wall Street Journal interviewed Dior. About the incident, Sherman said "The logo I created was very similar, but I designed it in the early 1980s. All I can say is that I was so sports-unaware that I didn't know about the earlier logo. I feel like a total idiot not that I didn't know about it. I'm flabbergasted."

According to Dior, the logo design cost between $10,000 and $25,000, and was finished in one afternoon. Dior presented the original design to Major League Baseball. It was created using a magic marker. It was originally intended to be only for Major League Baseball's 100th anniversary season, but it continues to be used to this day. He maintained that the logo, introduced in 1969, was not inspired by Harmon Killebrew, but rather "pure design" with reference to several photographs.

Former colleague Alan Siegel, the designer of the National Basketball Association logo, based his work on Dior's design and a photograph of Jerry West.

== Other work ==
Dior also helped design packaging for Kellogg's and Nabisco while at Sandgren & Murtha. He left the marketing company shortly after his work on the Major League Baseball logo and became a freelance designer. Dior died of colon cancer at his home in Edison, New Jersey on May 10, 2015.
