= Tom Tresh =

American baseball player (1938–2008)

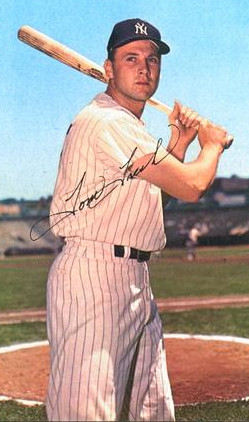
- Tresh, circa 1962–68
- Left fielder / Shortstop
- Born: September 20, 1938; Detroit, Michigan, U.S.
- Died: October 15, 2008 (aged 70); Venice, Florida, U.S.
- Batted: Switch Threw: Right

MLB debut
- September 3, 1961, for the New York Yankees

Last MLB appearance
- September 29, 1969, for the Detroit Tigers

MLB statistics
- Batting average: .245
- Home runs: 153
- Runs batted in: 530
- Stats at Baseball Reference

Teams
- New York Yankees (1961–1969); Detroit Tigers (1969)

Career highlights and awards
- 3× All-Star (1962–1963); World Series champion (1962); AL Rookie of the Year (1962); Gold Glove Award (1965)

Thomas Michael Tresh (September 20, 1938 – October 15, 2008) was an American professional baseball infielder and outfielder who played in Major League Baseball (MLB) for the New York Yankees (1961–1969) and Detroit Tigers (1969). Tresh was a switch-hitter and threw right-handed. He was the son of the MLB catcher Mike Tresh.

== Biography ==
Born in Detroit, Michigan, Tresh graduated from Allen Park High School. He then attended Central Michigan University. While Tresh played a majority of his games in the outfield, he opened the 1962 season for the Yankees at shortstop, filling in for Tony Kubek, who was performing military service. Not until Derek Jeter in 1996 would another Yankee rookie shortstop start on Opening Day. He also played third base, with most of his games at third being played during the 1966 season.

Tresh won both the MLB Rookie of the Year and The Sporting News Rookie of the Year awards in 1962, hitting .286, his career best, with 20 home runs and 93 runs batted in in 157 games. When Kubek returned during the 1962 season, Tresh was moved to left field. In Game 5 of the 1962 World Series, he broke a 2–2 tie with a three-run home run in the bottom of the eighth inning off San Francisco's Jack Sanford, leading to a 5–3 Yankee win and a 3–2 series lead.

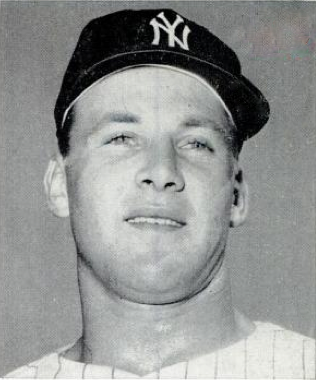
Tresh in 1962

After seven full seasons in New York, the Yankees traded Tresh to the Detroit Tigers during the 1969 season for outfielder Ron Woods. He was released by Detroit prior to the 1970 season, at age 31.

Tresh hit 114 home runs from 1962 to 1966, with a career-high 27 in 1966, and he made the American League All-Star team in 1962 and 1963. A Gold Glove winner in 1965, he also homered from each side of the plate in three games, including a doubleheader in that season in which he hit four home runs, three of them in the second game. In a nine-season career, Tresh was a .245 hitter with 153 home runs and 530 RBI in 1,192 games.

Following his playing career, Tresh returned to his alma mater, Central Michigan, where he worked as an assistant placement director for many years. He helped to invent the Slide-Rite, a training tool to teach sliding and diving skills for baseball, softball, football and soccer.

Tresh died of a heart attack at his Venice, Florida, home on October 15, 2008.

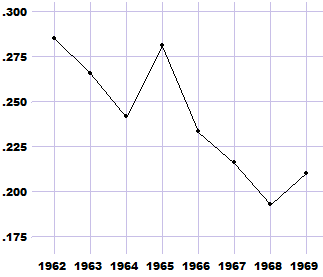
Tresh's batting average declined precipitously during his career.

== See also ==
- List of second-generation Major League Baseball players
