= Ron Woods =

American baseball player (born 1943)

- Outfielder
- Born: February 1, 1943 (age 82); Hamilton, Ohio, U.S.
- Batted: Right Threw: Right

Professional debut
- MLB: April 22, 1969, for the Detroit Tigers
- NPB: April 5, 1975, for the Chunichi Dragons

Last appearance
- MLB: September 29, 1974, for the Montreal Expos
- NPB: August 11, 1976, for the Chunichi Dragons

MLB statistics
- Batting average: .233
- Home runs: 26
- Runs batted in: 130

NPB statistics
- Batting average: .263
- Home runs: 19
- Runs batted in: 68
- Stats at Baseball Reference

Teams
- Detroit Tigers (1969); New York Yankees (1969–1971); Montreal Expos (1971–1974); Chunichi Dragons (1975–1976)

Ronald Lawrence Woods (born February 1, 1943) is an American former professional baseball player who appeared in all or part of six seasons in Major League Baseball from 1969 to 1974, primarily as an outfielder, for the Detroit Tigers, New York Yankees and Montreal Expos. He also played two seasons in Japan for the Chunichi Dragons in 1975–1976. Born in Hamilton, Ohio, Woods threw and batted right-handed, stood 5 feet 10 inches (1.78 m) tall and weighed 168 pounds (76 kg).

Woods graduated from Compton High School in Southern California, and entered pro baseball in the Pittsburgh Pirates' organization in June 1961. However, after five years in the Pittsburgh farm system, he had risen only as high as the Double-A level. Early in 1966, the Detroit Tigers acquired his contract. After a strong 1968 season with the Triple-A Toledo Mud Hens, Woods made the 1969 roster of the defending World Series champion Tigers out of spring training. He appeared in 17 early-season games for Detroit, largely as a pinch hitter, pinch runner and defensive replacement, before being traded June 14 to the New York Yankees for veteran outfielder Tom Tresh.

Although he struggled offensively, Woods was able to solidify his hold on a major league job with the Yankees, appearing in 192 games (starting 147) from June 1969 to June 1971. On June 25 of the latter year, the Yankees sent Woods to the Montreal Expos for former New York Mets outfielder Ron Swoboda. Despite a brief detour to Triple-A Winnipeg in 1971, Woods spent the next 31/2 years on the Expo roster, appearing in 373 games and batting a cumulative .245. In 1973, he was Montreal's most-used center fielder, starting 72 games and platooning with left-handed hitters Boots Day and Jim Lyttle, as the Expos, a fifth-year expansion team, battled for the National League East Division title before falling short by 31/2 games.

That off-season, however, the Expos traded for veteran center fielder Willie Davis of the Los Angeles Dodgers, relegating Woods to part-time status in 1974. He started 21 games all season, batted .205 in 127 at bats, and departed for the Chunichi Dragons of Nippon Professional Baseball. He played the 1975 and 1976 seasons in Japan, appearing in 192 total games and hitting .263 with 160 hits and 19 home runs.

Doing Woods' six seasons in the major leagues, Woods batted .233. His 290 hits in 1,247 at bats included 34 doubles, 12 triples, and 26 career home runs. He compiled 130 RBIs, and 27 stolen bases.

== Sources ==
- Career statistics from ESPN · Baseball Reference · Fangraphs · Baseball Reference (Minors) · Retrosheet · Baseball Almanac
