= Lou Camilli =

American baseball player (born 1946)

- Infielder
- Born: September 24, 1946 (age 79); El Paso, Texas
- Batted: Both Threw: Right

MLB debut
- August 9, 1969, for the Cleveland Indians

Last MLB appearance
- September 24, 1972, for the Cleveland Indians

MLB statistics
- Batting average: .146
- Home runs: 0
- Runs batted in: 3
- Stats at Baseball Reference

Teams
- Cleveland Indians (1969–1972)

Louis Steven Camilli (born September 24, 1946) is a former Major League Baseball infielder who played for four seasons for the Cleveland Indians. A switch hitter who threw right-handed, Camilli was listed as 5 feet 10 inches (1.78 m) tall and 170 pounds (77 kg).

Camilli played college baseball at Texas A&M University, under coach Tom Chandler, where he was an all-conference selection in both 1966 and 1967. In August 1966, he was one of 19 college baseball players named to represent the United States in the World Amateur Tournament. He also played summer ball with the Rapid City Chiefs in South Dakota, a team in the amateur Basin League. He was then selected by the Indians in the 3rd round of the 1967 MLB draft.

Camilli began his professional career with the 1967 Class-A Reno Silver Sox, where he hit .303 in 62 games. He was promoted to the Double-A Waterbury Indians in 1968 and made his Major League debut on August 9, 1969 at third base against the Kansas City Royals. He was hitless in four at-bats in the game. In 13 games with the Indians in 1969, he had 14 at-bats and failed to record a hit. He spent most of 1970 also with Waterbury before receiving a late season call-up. He also failed to record a hit in 15 at-bats that season.

Camilli recorded his first Major League hit with a single to center field against Vida Blue of the Oakland Athletics on April 30, 1971. His 34 at-bats without a hit marks the longest such streak for a non-pitcher at the start of a career since those records were first kept in 1908, according to Baseball Reference.

In four seasons from 1969–1972 with the Indians he played in 107 games, had 151 at-bats, 22 hits and a .146 batting average. He was used mostly as a utility infielder, a role that he embraced. The Indians never finished higher than fifth during Camilli's time with the team, leading him to quip, "They ought to change our name to the Cleveland Light Company. We don't have anything but utility men."

Camilli's professional baseball career ended after he hit .281 in 134 games for the 1973 Oklahoma City 89ers.
