= 1969 Major League Baseball season =

1969 MLB season
- League: American League (AL); National League (NL)
- Sport: Baseball
- Duration: Regular season: April 7 – October 2, 1969; Postseason: October 4–16, 1969
- Games: 162
- Teams: 24 (12 per league)
- TV partner: NBC

Draft
- Top draft pick: Jeff Burroughs
- Picked by: Washington Senators

Regular season
- Season MVP: AL: Harmon Killebrew (MIN); NL: Willie McCovey (SF)

Postseason
- AL champions: Baltimore Orioles
- AL runners-up: Minnesota Twins
- NL champions: New York Mets
- NL runners-up: Atlanta Braves

World Series
- Champions: New York Mets
- Runners-up: Baltimore Orioles
- World Series MVP: Donn Clendenon (NYM)

MLB seasons
- ← 1968 1970 →

Locations of teams for the 1969 American League season
West East
Locations of teams for the 1969 National League season
West East

The 1969 major league baseball season began on April 7, 1969, while the regular season ended on October 2. The postseason began on October 4. The 66th World Series began with Game 1 on October 11 and ended with Game 5 on October 16, with the New York Mets of the National League defeating the Baltimore Orioles of the American League, four games to one, capturing the franchise's first championship in what is considered one of the greatest upsets in World Series history. The season was celebrated as the 100th anniversary of professional baseball, honoring the first professional touring baseball team, the Cincinnati Red Stockings of 1869. The season also brought rule changes to counteract pitchers' dominance in recent seasons, such as lowering the pitcher's mound and shrinking the height of the strike zone.

The 40th All-Star Game was held on July 23 at the Robert F. Kennedy Memorial Stadium in Washington, D.C., home of the Washington Senators. The National League won, 9–3.

The season saw the third round of expansion of the decade (and second for each league), with the enfranchisement of the Kansas City Royals and Seattle Pilots in the American League and the Montreal Expos and San Diego Padres in the National League. Both leagues increased to 12 teams; the National League had last been so large in 1899.

This would be the only season for the Pilots, as stadium problems and bankruptcy would lead them to move to Milwaukee, Wisconsin, to become the Milwaukee Brewers the following season.

The expansion launched the "Divisional Era", as each league split its teams into two six-team divisions and scheduled more games between division rivals and fewer between interdivision teams. Each league implemented their own League Championship Series, which saw division champions face off in a best-of-five series (increased to seven in 1985) to determine pennant winners and World Series contenders.

The Baltimore Orioles won the AL East with a major-league-best 109–53 record, and then defeated the AL West champion Minnesota Twins in three games in the first American League Championship Series. The New York Mets won the NL East with an NL-best 100–62 record, and then defeated the NL West champion Atlanta Braves in three games in the first National League Championship Series. The "Miracle Mets", having joined the league in 1962, were the first expansion team to win a pennant.

== New commissioner ==
Bowie Kuhn was named the 5th commissioner of baseball at the start of the season replacing previous commissioner William Eckert. Eckert was forced out by the owners in December 1968 mainly because of his refusal to cancel games in the wake of the assassinations of Robert Kennedy and Martin Luther King Jr. and for his refusal to help the owners during a player strike they anticipated was around the corner. Kuhn was named interim commissioner during that time and became the official commissioner by the start of the season. Kuhn remains the youngest ever commissioner of baseball, being only 42 when he took office.

== Expansion ==
MLB called for a four-team expansion to take place in 1971 at the 1967 Winter Meetings, the first expansion since 1962. However, there was a complication: influential U.S. Senator Stuart Symington of Missouri was irate over the American League's approval of Kansas City Athletics owner Charles O. Finley's arrangement to move his team to Oakland, California, for the 1968 season. This happened even though Finley had just signed a deal to play at Municipal Stadium at AL president Joe Cronin's behest, and Jackson County, Missouri, had just issued public bonds to build a stadium, the future Royals Stadium (now Kauffman Stadium), which would be completed in 1973.

Symington drew up legislation to remove baseball's anti-trust exemption and threatened to pursue its passage if Kansas City did not get a new team. The leagues agreed and moved expansion up to 1969, with the AL putting one of its new franchises in Kansas City, Missouri. Ewing Kauffman won the bidding for that franchise, naming it the Kansas City Royals, after the local American Royal livestock show. The other AL team was awarded to Seattle, Washington. A consortium led by Dewey Soriano and William Daley won the bidding for the Seattle franchise and named it the Seattle Pilots, a salute to the harbor pilots of the Puget Sound maritime industry and to the city's place in the aviation industry.

In the NL, one franchise was awarded to San Diego, California; the other to Montreal, Quebec, resulting in the first MLB franchise outside the United States. C. Arnholdt Smith, former owner of the AAA Pacific Coast League's San Diego Padres, won the bidding for the San Diego franchise, and the new San Diego MLB team inherited the Padres moniker. Charles Bronfman, owner of Seagram, won the bidding for the Montreal franchise, naming them the Expos, in honor of the World's Fair that year. This was the last NL expansion until the 1993 season, and the last expansion for the major leagues overall until 1977.

== Division play ==
As part of the 1969 expansion, each league was to be split into two divisions of six teams each, with each league holding a best-of-five League Championship Series to decide the pennant. The AL was divided purely along geographic lines, but when it came to assign divisions in the NL, the Chicago Cubs and St. Louis Cardinals insisted on being placed in the same division with the New York Mets and Philadelphia Phillies, on the basis that a schedule with more games with eastern teams would create a more lucrative schedule. Thus, Atlanta and Cincinnati were placed in the NL West. This alignment also addressed concerns that putting the league's three strongest clubs at the time—St. Louis, San Francisco, and the Cubs—in the west would result in divisional inequity.

The Padres and Expos each finished with 110 losses and at the bottom of their respective divisions. The Royals did better, finishing 69–93 and in fourth in the AL West, ahead of the Chicago White Sox. Even though the Pilots managed to avoid losing 100 games (they finished 64–98, last in the AL West), financial trouble would lead to a battle for team control, ending with bankruptcy and the sale of the team to Bud Selig and its move to Milwaukee, Wisconsin, as the Milwaukee Brewers for the 1970 season. The legal fallout of the battle would lead eventually to another round of expansion for the AL in the 1977 season, with Seattle getting a new team called the Mariners.

== Logo ==
Logo commissioned by the Major League Baseball Centennial Committee and introduced by Commissioner Bowie Kuhn to celebrate 100 years of professional baseball.

A special silhouetted batter logo, still in use by the league today, was created by Jerry Dior to commemorate the 100th anniversary of professional baseball. Every player and official in Major League Baseball wore a jersey patch that featured the logo and the phrase "100th anniversary" in red letters. It has served as inspiration for logos for other sports leagues in the United States—most notably the National Basketball Association, which used the silhouette of Jerry West to create their current logo, unveiled after the 1968–69 season.

== Schedule ==
The 1969 schedule consisted of 162 games for all teams in the American League and National League, each of which had 12 teams. Each league was split into two six-team divisions. Each team was scheduled to play 18 games against their five division rivals, totaling 90 games, and 12 games against six interdivision opponents, totaling 72 games. This format was implemented due to expansion of each league from ten to 12 teams, and the subsequent split of each league into two divisions. This format would be used until 1977 in the American League and 1993 in the National League.

Opening Day took place on April 7, featuring six teams. The final day of the regular season was on October 2, featuring 18 teams. Each League Championship Series took place between October 4 and October 6. The World Series took place between October 11 and October 16.

== Rules changes ==
The 1969 season saw the following rule changes:

- In an effort to counteract a trend of low-scoring games and pitching ruling overall, Major League Baseball adopted two measures during the Baseball Winter Meetings held in December 1968.
  - The strike zone was reduced to the area over home plate between the armpits and the top of the knees of a batter.
  - The height of the pitcher's mound was reduced from 15 inches to 10 inches, and it was recommended that the slope be gradual and uniform in every park.
- A save became an official MLB statistic to reward relief pitchers who preserve a lead while finishing a game.
- For relievers entering a game mid-game, scorers were now allowed to charge relievers with earned runs allowed, including potential inning ending plays that instead ended with errors. Runs would be earned for the relief pitcher, but unearned for the team.
- A "temporary inactive list" was created for players for when they were injured or ill, unrelated to baseball activities. For 21 days, players would be removed from rosters and would go unpaid. However, players would still remain under contract.
- The American League continued to experiment with rules during spring training, further experimenting with a permanent designated hitter and permanent pinch runner, as well as the automatically awarding first base for intentional walks (a rule that would not be implemented until 2017.
- Mid-season, the National League ruled that if a second game of a doubleheader was called off due to darkness, the game would be a suspended game.

== Teams ==
League	Division	Team	City	Ballpark	Capacity	Manager
American League	East	Baltimore Orioles	Baltimore, Maryland	Baltimore Memorial Stadium	52,137	Earl Weaver
American League	East	Boston Red Sox	Boston, Massachusetts	Fenway Park	33,375	Dick Williams
American League	East	Boston Red Sox	Boston, Massachusetts	Fenway Park	33,375	Eddie Popowski
American League	East	Cleveland Indians	Cleveland, Ohio	Cleveland Stadium	76,966	Alvin Dark
American League	East	Detroit Tigers	Detroit, Michigan	Tiger Stadium	54,226	Mayo Smith
American League	East	New York Yankees	New York, New York	Yankee Stadium	67,000	Ralph Houk
American League	East	Washington Senators	Washington, D.C.	Robert F. Kennedy Memorial Stadium	43,500	Ted Williams
American League	West	California Angels	Anaheim, California	Anaheim Stadium	43,202	Bill Rigney
American League	West	California Angels	Anaheim, California	Anaheim Stadium	43,202	Lefty Phillips
American League	West	Chicago White Sox	Chicago, Illinois	White Sox Park	46,550	Al López
American League	West	Chicago White Sox	Chicago, Illinois	White Sox Park	46,550	Don Gutteridge
American League	West	Kansas City Royals	Kansas City, Missouri	Municipal Stadium	34,164	Joe Gordon
American League	West	Minnesota Twins	Bloomington, Minnesota	Metropolitan Stadium	45,182	Billy Martin
American League	West	Oakland Athletics	Oakland, California	Oakland–Alameda County Coliseum	50,000	Hank Bauer
American League	West	Oakland Athletics	Oakland, California	Oakland–Alameda County Coliseum	50,000	John McNamara
American League	West	Seattle Pilots	Seattle, Washington	Sick's Stadium	25,420	Joe Schultz Jr.
National League	East	Chicago Cubs	Chicago, Illinois	Wrigley Field	36,644	Leo Durocher
National League	East	Montreal Expos	Montreal, Quebec	Jarry Park Stadium	28,456	Gene Mauch
National League	East	New York Mets	New York, New York	Shea Stadium	55,300	Gil Hodges
National League	East	Philadelphia Phillies	Philadelphia, Pennsylvania	Connie Mack Stadium	33,608	Bob Skinner
National League	East	Philadelphia Phillies	Philadelphia, Pennsylvania	Connie Mack Stadium	33,608	George Myatt
National League	East	Pittsburgh Pirates	Pittsburgh, Pennsylvania	Forbes Field	35,500	Larry Shepard
National League	East	Pittsburgh Pirates	Pittsburgh, Pennsylvania	Forbes Field	35,500	Alex Grammas
National League	East	St. Louis Cardinals	St. Louis, Missouri	Civic Center Busch Memorial Stadium	49,450	Red Schoendienst
National League	West	Atlanta Braves	Atlanta, Georgia	Atlanta Stadium	51,383	Lum Harris
National League	West	Cincinnati Reds	Cincinnati, Ohio	Crosley Field	29,603	Dave Bristol
National League	West	Houston Astros	Houston, Texas	Houston Astrodome	44,500	Harry Walker
National League	West	Los Angeles Dodgers	Los Angeles, California	Dodger Stadium	56,000	Walter Alston
National League	West	San Diego Padres	San Diego, California	San Diego Stadium	50,000	Preston Gómez
National League	West	San Francisco Giants	San Francisco, California	Candlestick Park	42,500	Clyde King

=== Neutral site game ===
The Chicago White Sox hosted 11 neutral site games throughout the season against each of the 11 other American League teams in Milwaukee, Wisconsin, the former home of the recently relocated Milwaukee Braves.

Team	City	Ballpark	Capacity	Games played
Chicago White Sox	Milwaukee, Wisconsin	Milwaukee County Stadium	43,768	11

== Spring training boycott ==
After the 1968 season, the Major League Baseball Players' Association and the owners had concluded the first collective bargaining agreement in major league history. However, one point remained unresolved: the owners refused to increase their contribution to the players' pension plan commensurately with revenues from television broadcasts, which were increasing as more and more fans watched games that way. With the two sides at an impasse, at the beginning of the year the union called on players to refuse to sign contracts until the issue was resolved. Many did, including stars like Brooks Robinson.

The owners did not change their position, so the players' union called for members to boycott spring training the following month if the issue had not been resolved by then. After the union rejected the owners' offer of a higher yet still fixed contribution on February 17, the day before spring training was to begin, 400 players refused to report. The owners expected the situation to resolve itself soon in their favor, since they usually lost money on training camps while the players were foregoing their pay in the meantime.

The players remained united, and few changed their minds about the boycott as it progressed. After the first week only 11 of those who initially boycotted had reported; at the time many had off-season jobs which they continued to work at, and those who did report were in many cases not certain of their futures with their teams. Meanwhile, the owners were being pressured by the television broadcasters, who would also lose money without games to broadcast, or if teams played games with largely unknown rookies—one NBC executive said his company "would not pay major league prices for minor league games".

After that first week, new commissioner Bowie Kuhn leaned on the owners to reach an agreement as well, and they soon sat down with the players again. By February 25 they had acceded to most of the players' demands: a higher contribution of approximately $5.45 million annually, an earlier age at which players could begin drawing pensions, a wider range of benefits and less playing time required for eligibility. By the end of the month, all players had reported to spring training.

== Standings ==
=== American League ===
AL East
Team	W	L	Pct.	GB	Home	Road
Baltimore Orioles	109	53	.673	—	60‍–‍21	49‍–‍32
Detroit Tigers	90	72	.556	19	46‍–‍35	44‍–‍37
Boston Red Sox	87	75	.537	22	46‍–‍35	41‍–‍40
Washington Senators	86	76	.531	23	47‍–‍34	39‍–‍42
New York Yankees	80	81	.497	28½	48‍–‍32	32‍–‍49
Cleveland Indians	62	99	.385	46½	33‍–‍48	29‍–‍51

AL West
Team	W	L	Pct.	GB	Home	Road
Minnesota Twins	97	65	.599	—	57‍–‍24	40‍–‍41
Oakland Athletics	88	74	.543	9	49‍–‍32	39‍–‍42
California Angels	71	91	.438	26	43‍–‍38	28‍–‍53
Kansas City Royals	69	93	.426	28	36‍–‍45	33‍–‍48
Chicago White Sox	68	94	.420	29	41‍–‍40	27‍–‍54
Seattle Pilots	64	98	.395	33	34‍–‍47	30‍–‍51

=== National League ===
NL East
Team	W	L	Pct.	GB	Home	Road
New York Mets	100	62	.617	—	52‍–‍30	48‍–‍32
Chicago Cubs	92	70	.568	8	49‍–‍32	43‍–‍38
Pittsburgh Pirates	88	74	.543	12	47‍–‍34	41‍–‍40
St. Louis Cardinals	87	75	.537	13	42‍–‍38	45‍–‍37
Philadelphia Phillies	63	99	.389	37	30‍–‍51	33‍–‍48
Montreal Expos	52	110	.321	48	24‍–‍57	28‍–‍53

NL West
Team	W	L	Pct.	GB	Home	Road
Atlanta Braves	93	69	.574	—	50‍–‍31	43‍–‍38
San Francisco Giants	90	72	.556	3	52‍–‍29	38‍–‍43
Cincinnati Reds	89	73	.549	4	50‍–‍31	39‍–‍42
Los Angeles Dodgers	85	77	.525	8	50‍–‍31	35‍–‍46
Houston Astros	81	81	.500	12	52‍–‍29	29‍–‍52
San Diego Padres	52	110	.321	41	28‍–‍53	24‍–‍57

=== Tie games ===
3 tie games (2 in AL, 1 in NL), which are not factored into winning percentage or games behind (and were often replayed again) occurred throughout the season.

==== American League ====
The California Angels, Kansas City Royals, New York Yankees, and Seattle Pilots had one tie each.

- May 31, Kansas City Royals vs. New York Yankees, tied at 2 in the middle of the eighth inning due to rain following a 30 minute rain delay.
- September 12 (game 2), Seattle Pilots vs. California Angels, tied at 1 after the middle of the tenth inning due to rain.

==== National League ====
The Chicago Cubs and Cincinnati Reds had one tie each.

- May 26, Chicago Cubs vs. Cincinnati Reds, tied at 5 in the middle of the ninth inning due to rain.

== Postseason ==
The postseason began on October 4 and ended on October 16 with the New York Mets defeating the Baltimore Orioles in the 1969 World Series in five games.

=== Bracket ===
League Championship Series (ALCS, NLCS)
East	Baltimore	3
West	Minnesota	0
East	NY Mets	3
West	Atlanta	0

World Series
AL	Baltimore	1
NL	NY Mets	4

== Managerial changes ==
=== Off-season ===
Team	Former Manager	New Manager
Kansas City Royals	Team enfranchised	Joe Gordon
Minnesota Twins	Cal Ermer	Billy Martin
Montreal Expos	Team enfranchised	Gene Mauch
Oakland Athletics	Bob Kennedy	Hank Bauer
San Diego Padres	Team enfranchised	Preston Gómez
San Francisco Giants	Herman Franks	Clyde King
Seattle Pilots	Team enfranchised	Joe Schultz Jr.
Washington Senators	Jim Lemon	Ted Williams

=== In-season ===
Team	Former Manager	New Manager
Boston Red Sox	Dick Williams	Eddie Popowski
California Angels	Bill Rigney	Lefty Phillips
Chicago White Sox	Al López	Don Gutteridge
Oakland Athletics	Hank Bauer	John McNamara
Philadelphia Phillies	Bob Skinner	George Myatt
Pittsburgh Pirates	Larry Shepard	Alex Grammas

== League leaders ==
=== American League ===
Hitting leaders
Stat	Player	Total
AVG	Rod Carew (MIN)	.332
OPS	Reggie Jackson (OAK)	1.018
HR	Harmon Killebrew (MIN)	49
RBI	Harmon Killebrew (MIN)	140
R	Reggie Jackson (OAK)	123
H	Tony Oliva (MIN)	197
SB	Tommy Harper (SEP)	73

Pitching leaders
Stat	Player	Total
W	Denny McLain (DET)	24
L	Luis Tiant (CLE)	20
ERA	Dick Bosman (WAS)	2.19
K	Sam McDowell (CLE)	279
IP	Denny McLain (DET)	325.0
SV	Ron Perranoski (MIN)	31
WHIP	Fritz Peterson (NYY)	0.996

=== National League ===
Hitting leaders
Stat	Player	Total
AVG	Pete Rose (CIN)	.348
OPS	Willie McCovey (SF)	1.108
HR	Willie McCovey (SF)	45
RBI	Willie McCovey (SF)	126
R	Bobby Bonds (SF); Pete Rose (CIN)	120
H	Matty Alou (PIT)	231
SB	Lou Brock (STL)	53

Pitching leaders
Stat	Player	Total
W	Tom Seaver (NYM)	25
L	Clay Kirby (SD)	20
ERA	Juan Marichal (SF)	2.10
K	Ferguson Jenkins (CHC)	273
IP	Gaylord Perry (SF)	325.1
SV	Fred Gladding (HOU)	29
WHIP	Juan Marichal (SF)	0.994

== Regular season recap ==
The pennant races in the American League lacked drama. In the east, the Baltimore Orioles won 109 games and won the division by a whopping 19 games over the defending world champion Detroit Tigers. The surprise team was the "new" Washington Senators. Under new manager Ted Williams, they went 86–76; it was their first winning season since joining the league in 1961. The Western Division race was a little closer, but the Minnesota Twins led most of the season and were never really threatened in winning the division by 9 games over the Oakland Athletics (who were the only other west team to finish over .500). The National League, on the other hand, was very dramatic. The Chicago Cubs won 35 of their first 50 games, and on August 16, they led the New York Mets and St. Louis Cardinals by 9 games. But the Mets proceeded to win 37 of their last 48 games while the Cubs went 20–28 in the same time period and the Mets won the division by 8 games. In the West, with 3 weeks to play in the season, 5 teams were all within 2 games of each other. The Houston Astros were the first to drop out of the race, losing 8 of 10. With two weeks to play, the San Francisco Giants led the Los Angeles Dodgers and Atlanta Braves by ½ game while the Cincinnati Reds were 2 games back. The Dodgers then lost 8 in a row and 10 of 11 to fall to 4th place. The Braves then went on a 10-game winning streak, ultimately clinching the division over the Giants on the next to last day of the season with a 3–2 win over the Reds. For the Giants, it was the 5th year in a row they would finish in 2nd place.

== Milestones ==
=== Batters ===
- Billy Williams (CHC):
  - Ties a major league record for four consecutive doubles against the Philadelphia Phillies on April 9.
- Harmon Killebrew (MIN):
  - Became the 14th player in Major League history to hit 400 home runs in the first inning against the Chicago White Sox on April 27.
- Reggie Jackson (OAK):
  - Became the eighth player to hit at least 10 runs batted in (RBI) in a single game, hitting 10 against the Boston Red Sox on June 14.
- Willie Mays (SF):
  - Became the second player in Major League history to hit 600 home runs in the seventh inning against the San Diego Padres on September 22.

=== Pitchers ===
==== No-hitters ====
- Bill Stoneman (MON):
  - Stoneman threw his first career no-hitter and first no-hitter in franchise history, by defeating the Philadelphia Phillies 7–0 on April 17. Stoneman walked five and struck out eight.
- Jim Maloney (CIN):
  - Maloney threw his second career no-hitter and 12th no-hitter in franchise history, by defeating the Houston Astros 10–0 on April 30. Maloney walked five and struck out 13.
- Don Wilson (HOU):
  - Wilson threw his second career no-hitter and fourth no-hitter in franchise history, by defeating the Cincinnati Reds 4–0 on May 1. Wilson walked six, hit one by pitch, and struck out 13.
- Jim Palmer (BAL):
  - Palmer threw his first career no-hitter and eighth no-hitter in franchise history, by defeating the Oakland Athletics 8–0 on August 13. Palmer walked six and struck out eight.
- Ken Holtzman (CHC):
  - Holtzman threw his first career no-hitter and ninth no-hitter in franchise history, by defeating the Atlanta Braves 3–0 on August 19. Holtzman walked three and struck out none.
- Bob Moose (PIT):
  - Moose threw his first career no-hitter and third no-hitter in franchise history, by defeating the New York Mets 4–0 on September 20. Moose walked three and struck out six.

==== Other pitching accomplishments ====
- Steve Carlton (STL):
  - Set a modern Major League record (and became the third player to tie the all-time record) for most strikeouts in a single nine-inning game, throwing 19 strikeouts in a 4–3 loss to the New York Mets on September 15.

=== Miscellaneous ===
- Chicago Cubs:
  - Ties a National League record for most one-sided shutout, defeating the San Diego Padres 19–0 on May 13.
- Minnesota Twins:
  - Set a major league record for most runs scored in the 10th inning, by scoring 11 runs against the Oakland Athletics on June 21.

== Awards and honors ==
=== Regular season ===
Baseball Writers' Association of America Awards
BBWAA Award	National League	American League
Rookie of the Year	Ted Sizemore (LAD)	Lou Piniella (KC)
Cy Young Award	Tom Seaver (NYM)	Mike Cuellar (BAL); Denny McLain (DET)
Most Valuable Player	Willie McCovey (SF)	Harmon Killebrew (MIN)
Babe Ruth Award (World Series MVP)	Al Weis (NYM)	—
Gold Glove Awards
Position	National League	American League
Pitcher	Bob Gibson (STL)	Jim Kaat (MIN)
Catcher	Johnny Bench (CIN)	Bill Freehan (DET)
1st Base	Wes Parker (LAD)	Joe Pepitone (NYY)
2nd Base	Félix Millán (ATL)	Davey Johnson (BAL)
3rd Base	Clete Boyer (ATL)	Brooks Robinson (BAL)
Shortstop	Don Kessinger (CHC)	Mark Belanger (BAL)
Outfield	Roberto Clemente (PIT)	Paul Blair (BAL)
Outfield	Curt Flood (STL)	Mickey Stanley (DET)
Outfield	Pete Rose (CIN)	Carl Yastrzemski (BOS)

=== Other awards ===
- Hutch Award: Al Kaline (DET)
- Sport Magazine's World Series Most Valuable Player Award: Donn Clendenon (NYM)

The Sporting News Awards
Award	National League	American League
Player of the Year	Willie McCovey (SF)	—
Pitcher of the Year	Tom Seaver (NYM)	Denny McLain (DET)
Fireman of the Year (Relief pitcher)	Wayne Granger (CIN)	Ron Perranoski (MIN)
Rookie Player of the Year	Coco Laboy (MON)	Carlos May (CWS)
Rookie Pitcher of the Year	Tom Griffin (HOU)	Mike Nagy (BOS)
Comeback Player of the Year	Tommie Agee (NYM)	Tony Conigliaro (BOS)
Manager of the Year	Gil Hodges (NYM)	—
Executive of the Year	Johnny Murphy (NYM)	—

=== Monthly awards ===
==== Player of the Month ====
Month	National League
April	Willie McCovey (SF)
May	Ken Holtzman (CHC)
June	Ron Santo (CHC)
July	Roberto Clemente (PIT)
August	Willie Davis (LAD)

=== Baseball Hall of Fame ===
- Roy Campanella
- Stan Coveleski
- Waite Hoyt
- Stan Musial

== Home field attendance ==
Team name	Wins	%±	Home attendance	%±	Per game
New York Mets	100	37.0%	2,175,373	22.1%	26,529
Boston Red Sox	87	1.2%	1,833,246	−5.5%	22,633
Los Angeles Dodgers	85	11.8%	1,784,527	12.9%	22,031
St. Louis Cardinals	87	−10.3%	1,682,783	−16.3%	21,035
Chicago Cubs	92	9.5%	1,674,993	60.5%	20,427
Detroit Tigers	90	−12.6%	1,577,481	−22.4%	19,475
Atlanta Braves	93	14.8%	1,458,320	29.5%	18,004
Houston Astros	81	12.5%	1,442,995	9.9%	17,815
Minnesota Twins	97	22.8%	1,349,328	18.0%	16,658
Montreal Expos	52		1,212,608		14,970
New York Yankees	80	−3.6%	1,067,996	−9.9%	13,350
Baltimore Orioles	109	19.8%	1,062,069	12.5%	13,112
Cincinnati Reds	89	7.2%	987,991	34.7%	12,197
Washington Senators	86	32.3%	918,106	67.9%	11,335
Kansas City Royals	69		902,414		11,005
San Francisco Giants	90	2.3%	873,603	4.3%	10,785
Oakland Athletics	88	7.3%	778,232	−7.1%	9,608
Pittsburgh Pirates	88	10.0%	769,369	10.9%	9,498
California Angels	71	6.0%	758,388	−26.1%	9,363
Seattle Pilots	64		677,944		8,268
Cleveland Indians	62	−27.9%	619,970	−27.7%	7,654
Chicago White Sox	68	1.5%	589,546	−26.7%	7,278
Philadelphia Phillies	63	−17.1%	519,414	−21.8%	6,413
San Diego Padres	52		512,970		6,333

== Venues ==
The 1969 season saw four new teams across the major leagues, and with it, four new venues:

- The Kansas City Royals played at Municipal Stadium, where they would play for four seasons through 1972. This was the former home of the American League's Kansas City Athletics.
- The Montreal Expos played at Jarry Park Stadium, a temporary home where they would play for eight seasons through 1976.
- The San Diego Padres played at San Diego Stadium, where they would play for 35 seasons through 2003.
- The Seattle Pilots played their only season at Sick's Stadium, the long-time home of the Pacific Coast League Seattle Rainiers/Angels, playing their last game on October 2 against the Oakland Athletics, relocating to Milwaukee, Wisconsin at Milwaukee County Stadium for the start of the 1970 season.

The Washington Senators' District of Columbia Stadium was announced to be renamed to Robert F. Kennedy Memorial Stadium on January 18, in the last days of the Johnson Administration, Secretary of the Interior Stewart Udall announced that the stadium would be renamed Robert F. Kennedy Memorial Stadium, in Kennedy's honor following his assassination in 1968. The dedication ceremony at the stadium was held several months later on June 7. The official renaming ceremony was held on June 7, but by then many had already been referring to it as "RFK Stadium" or simply "RFK".

In addition to their primary home at White Sox Park, the Chicago White Sox would continue to play at the former home of the Milwaukee Braves in Milwaukee, Wisconsin, at Milwaukee County Stadium, playing 11 of 81 home games (one against every other American League team), on April 23, May 22, 28, June 11, 16, July 2, 7, August 6, 13, September 1, and 26. Though accounting for only 14% of home games, these 11 games accounted for 34% of all home games attendance for the White Sox.

== Media ==
=== Television ===
NBC was the exclusive national TV broadcaster of MLB, airing the weekend Game of the Week, the All-Star Game, both League Championship Series, and the World Series.

== Retired numbers ==
- Mickey Mantle had his No. 7 retired by the New York Yankees on June 8. This was the fourth number retired by the team.
- Eddie Mathews had his No. 41 retired by the Atlanta Braves on July 26. This was the first number retired by the team.

== See also ==
- 1969 in baseball (Events, Births, Deaths)
- 1969 Nippon Professional Baseball season
