= 1969 Seattle Pilots season =

1969 Seattle Pilots
- League: American League
- Division: West
- Ballpark: Sick's Stadium
- City: Seattle
- Record: 64–98 (.395)
- Divisional place: 6th
- Owners: Dewey Soriano
- General managers: Marvin Milkes
- Managers: Joe Schultz
- Television: KING-TV (Joe Daggett, Rod Belcher)
- Radio: KVI (Jimmy Dudley, Bill Schonely)

The 1969 Seattle Pilots season was the only season of the Seattle Pilots, a Major League Baseball team. As an expansion team in the American League, along with the Kansas City Royals, the Pilots were placed in the newly established West division. They finished last among the six teams with a record of 64–98 (.395), 33 games behind the division champion Minnesota Twins.

Fewer than 678,000 fans came to see the Pilots, which ranked 20th of the 24 major league teams — a major reason why the team was forced into bankruptcy after only one season. Despite the poor conditions at aging Sick's Stadium, the ticket prices were among the highest in the major leagues. The bankruptcy sale of the team was approved by a federal court in Seattle on March 31, 1970, and the team moved to Milwaukee at the end of spring training for the 1970 season and became the Milwaukee Brewers. Milwaukee had lost the Braves when they relocated to Atlanta after the 1965 season.

A book about the season exists called The 1969 Seattle Pilots: Major League Baseball's One-Year Team. Part of the Pilots' season was also documented in the book Ball Four by Jim Bouton.

After the Pilots, there would not be another MLB team in Seattle until the birth of the Mariners in 1977.

The last remaining active member of the 1969 Seattle Pilots was Fred Stanley, who retired after the 1982 season.

Jim Bouton had the team autograph a baseball and gave it to a fan. The ball is now in the National Baseball Hall of Fame in Cooperstown.

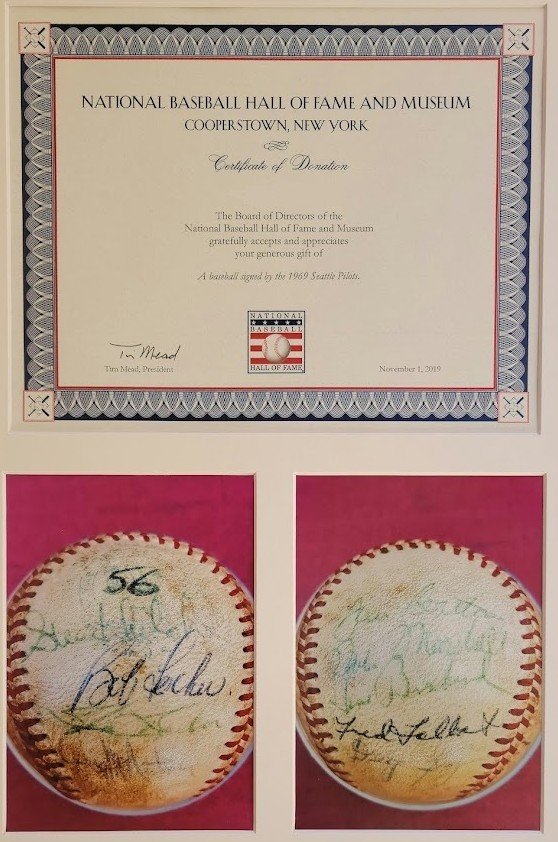
Seattle Pilots 1969 Team Autographed Baseball obtained by Jim Bouton for a fan

== Offseason ==
- April 1, 1968: Marv Staehle was purchased by the Pilots from the Cleveland Indians.
- June 7, 1968: Wilbur Howard was selected by the Pilots in the 19th round of the 1968 Major League Baseball draft.
- October 21, 1968: Jim Bouton was purchased by the Pilots from the New York Yankees.
- March 31, 1969: Chico Salmon was traded by the Pilots to the Baltimore Orioles for Gene Brabender and Gordy Lund.

=== Expansion draft ===
The MLB expansion draft for the Pilots and the Kansas City Royals was held on October 15, 1968.

| Player | Former team | Pick | Notes |
|---|---|---|---|
| Don Mincher | California Angels | 2nd | |
| Tommy Harper | Cleveland Indians | 3rd | |
| Ray Oyler | Detroit Tigers | 5th | |
| Jerry McNertney | Chicago White Sox | 7th | |
| Buzz Stephen | Minnesota Twins | 9th | Never played for Seattle; only major league experience was in 1968. |
| Chico Salmon | Cleveland Indians | 11th | Traded before the start of the season to Baltimore for Gene Brabender and Gordon Lund. |
| Diego Seguí | Oakland Athletics | 14th | |
| Tommy Davis | Chicago White Sox | 16th | |
| Marty Pattin | California Angels | 18th | |
| Gerry Schoen | Washington Senators | 20th | Never played for Seattle; only major league experience was in 1968. |
| Gary Bell | Boston Red Sox | 21st | |
| Jack Aker | Oakland Athletics | 24th | |
| Rich Rollins | Minnesota Twins | 26th | |
| Lou Piniella | Cleveland Indians | 28th | Traded shortly before opening day to Kansas City for Steve Whitaker and John Gelnar. |
| Dick Bates | Washington Senators | 30th | |
| Larry Haney | Baltimore Orioles | 32nd | |
| Dick Baney | Boston Red Sox | 33rd | |
| Steve Hovley | California Angels | 35th | |
| Steve Barber | New York Yankees | 37th | |
| John Miklos | Washington Senators | 39th | Never played in the major leagues. |
| Wayne Comer | Detroit Tigers | 41st | |
| Bucky Brandon | Boston Red Sox | 44th | |
| Skip Lockwood | Oakland Athletics | 46th | |
| Gary Timberlake | New York Yankees | 48th | |
| Bob Richmond | Washington Senators | 50th | Never played in the major leagues. |
| John Morris | Baltimore Orioles | 52nd | |
| Mike Marshall | Detroit Tigers | 53rd | |
| Jim Gosger | Oakland Athletics | 55th | |
| Mike Ferraro | New York Yankees | 57th | |
| Paul Click | California Angels | 59th | Pitched in the minors through 1973. Never played in the major leagues. |

=== 1968 MLB June amateur draft and minor league affiliates ===
The Pilots and Kansas City Royals, along with the two National League expansion teams set to debut in 1969, the Montreal Expos and San Diego Padres, were allowed to participate in the June 1968 MLB first-year player draft, although the new teams were barred from the lottery's first three rounds. The Pilots drafted 29 players in the 1968 June draft, including future major league manager Tom Kelly (eighth round) and starting pitcher Bill Parsons (seventh round). Seattle affiliated with one minor league club during 1968 to develop drafted players; the roster was filled out by professional and amateur free agents that had been signed and players loaned from other organizations.

==== 1968 farm system ====
| Level | Team | League | Manager |
|---|---|---|---|
| A-Short Season | Newark Co-Pilots | New York–Penn League | Sibby Sisti |

== Regular season ==
- On Tuesday, April 8, the Pilots won their first-ever game, 4–3 at Anaheim Stadium over the California Angels. Twenty-six-year-old Pilots' starter Marty Pattin went five innings, allowing two earned runs for Seattle. RHP Jack Aker earned the save. Right fielder Mike Hegan hit Seattle's first-ever home run, a two-run shot off Jim McGlothlin, after second baseman Tommy Harper had doubled to left to begin the Pilots' existence.
- On the afternoon of Friday, April 11, the Pilots played, and won, their first American League game at Sick's Stadium in Seattle – 7–0 over the Chicago White Sox. Thirty-two-year-old righty Gary Bell tossed a complete game for Seattle, scattering nine hits, striking out six Sox and walking four. Bell also helped his own cause by stroking a two-run double off RHP Bob Locker in the bottom of the sixth. Seattle 1b Don Mincher hit a two-run HR off RHP Joe Horlen in the third. The official attendance was 14,993.
- On July 2, Reggie Jackson of the Oakland Athletics hit three home runs against the Pilots to raise his season total to 34.
- In the 1969 Major League Baseball All-Star Game, outfielder Mike Hegan was the only Pilot selected to the All-Star game on the reserved squad. However, due to injury, he would be replaced by his teammate, infielder Don Mincher.
- On October 2, the Pilots played their last-ever game, losing 3-1 to Oakland in front of 5,473 fans in Seattle. In the final inning, Steve Whitaker hit the Pilots' last-ever home run, Greg Goossen got their final hit (a single), and Jerry McNertney struck out to end the game. Steve Barber took the loss. Miguel Fuentes, who would be killed in a bar fight during the off-season, threw what turned out to be the final pitch in Pilots’ history.

=== Season standings ===
AL West
| Team | W | L | Pct. | GB | Home | Road |
|---|---|---|---|---|---|---|
| Minnesota Twins | 97 | 65 | .599 | — | 57‍–‍24 | 40‍–‍41 |
| Oakland Athletics | 88 | 74 | .543 | 9 | 49‍–‍32 | 39‍–‍42 |
| California Angels | 71 | 91 | .438 | 26 | 43‍–‍38 | 28‍–‍53 |
| Kansas City Royals | 69 | 93 | .426 | 28 | 36‍–‍45 | 33‍–‍48 |
| Chicago White Sox | 68 | 94 | .420 | 29 | 41‍–‍40 | 27‍–‍54 |
| Seattle Pilots | 64 | 98 | .395 | 33 | 34‍–‍47 | 30‍–‍51 |

=== Record vs. opponents ===
1969 American League records Sources:
| Team | BAL | BOS | CAL | CWS | CLE | DET | KC | MIN | NYY | OAK | SEA | WAS |
|---|---|---|---|---|---|---|---|---|---|---|---|---|
| Baltimore | — | 10–8 | 6–6 | 9–3 | 13–5 | 11–7 | 11–1 | 8–4 | 11–7 | 8–4 | 9–3 | 13–5 |
| Boston | 8–10 | — | 8–4 | 5–7 | 12–6 | 10–8 | 10–2 | 7–5 | 11–7 | 4–8 | 6–6 | 6–12 |
| California | 6–6 | 4–8 | — | 9–9 | 8–4 | 5–7 | 9–9 | 7–11 | 3–9 | 6–12 | 9–9–1 | 5–7 |
| Chicago | 3–9 | 7–5 | 9–9 | — | 8–4 | 3–9 | 8–10 | 5–13 | 3–9 | 8–10 | 10–8 | 4–8 |
| Cleveland | 5–13 | 6–12 | 4–8 | 4–8 | — | 7–11 | 7–5 | 5–7 | 9–8 | 5–7 | 7–5 | 3–15 |
| Detroit | 7–11 | 8–10 | 7–5 | 9–3 | 11–7 | — | 8–4 | 6–6 | 10–8 | 7–5 | 10–2 | 7–11 |
| Kansas City | 1–11 | 2–10 | 9–9 | 10–8 | 5–7 | 4–8 | — | 8–10 | 5–7–1 | 8–10 | 10–8 | 7–5 |
| Minnesota | 4–8 | 5–7 | 11–7 | 13–5 | 7–5 | 6–6 | 10–8 | — | 10–2 | 13–5 | 12–6 | 6–6 |
| New York | 7–11 | 7–11 | 9–3 | 9–3 | 8–9 | 8–10 | 7–5–1 | 2–10 | — | 6–6 | 7–5 | 10–8 |
| Oakland | 4–8 | 8–4 | 12–6 | 10–8 | 7–5 | 5–7 | 10–8 | 5–13 | 6–6 | — | 13–5 | 8–4 |
| Seattle | 3–9 | 6–6 | 9–9–1 | 8–10 | 5–7 | 2–10 | 8–10 | 6–12 | 5–7 | 5–13 | — | 7–5 |
| Washington | 5–13 | 12–6 | 7–5 | 8–4 | 15–3 | 11–7 | 5–7 | 6–6 | 8–10 | 4–8 | 5–7 | — |

=== The first game ===
April 8, Anaheim Stadium, Anaheim, California

| Team | 1 | 2 | 3 | 4 | 5 | 6 | 7 | 8 | 9 | R | H | E |
|---|---|---|---|---|---|---|---|---|---|---|---|---|
| **Seattle** | 4 | 0 | 0 | 0 | 0 | 0 | 0 | 0 | 0 | **4** | **6** | **0** |
| California | 0 | 1 | 0 | 0 | 1 | 0 | 1 | 0 | 0 | **3** | **10** | **1** |
W: Marty Pattin (1–0) L: Jim McGlothlin (0–1) SV: Jack Aker (1)
HRs: SEA: Mike Hegan (1), CAL: Jim Fregosi (1)

=== Opening Day Lineup ===
Opening Day Starters
| # | Name | Position |
|---|---|---|
| 21 | Tommy Harper | 2B |
| 8 | Mike Hegan | RF |
| 12 | Tommy Davis | LF |
| 5 | Don Mincher | 1B |
| 9 | Rich Rollins | 3B |
| 14 | Jim Gosger | CF |
| 15 | Jerry McNertney | C |
| 1 | Ray Oyler | SS |
| 33 | Marty Pattin | P |

=== Notable transactions ===
- April 1: Lou Piniella was traded by the Pilots to the Kansas City Royals for Steve Whitaker and John Gelnar.
- May 27: Jim Pagliaroni was purchased by the Pilots from the Oakland Athletics.
- June 5: 1969 Major League Baseball draft
  - Gorman Thomas was selected by the Pilots in the first round (21st pick).
  - Bob Coluccio was selected by the Pilots in the 17th round.
- June 14: Larry Haney was traded by the Pilots to the Oakland Athletics for John Donaldson.
- August 24: Jim Bouton was traded by the Pilots to the Houston Astros for Dooley Womack and Roric Harrison.
- September 13: Marv Staehle was purchased from the Pilots by the Montreal Expos.

=== Roster ===
1969 Seattle Pilots
**Roster**
| **Pitchers**: 23 Jack Aker; 32 Dick Baney; 13 Steve Barber; 46 Dick Bates; 39 Gary Bell; 56 Jim Bouton; 32 Gene Brabender; 27 Bucky Brandon; 39 George Brunet; 38 Bill Edgerton; 14 Miguel Fuentes; 25 John Gelnar; 27 Bob Locker; 42 Skip Lockwood; 28 Mike Marshall; 38 Bob Meyer; 35 John Morris; 43 John O'Donoghue; 33 Marty Pattin; 39 Garry Roggenburk; 24 Diego Seguí; 40 Jerry Stephenson; 23 Fred Talbot; 45 Gary Timberlake; 41 Dooley Womack | **Catchers**: 10 Larry Haney; 15 Jerry McNertney; 17 Jim Pagliaroni; 26 Merritt Ranew; 30 Freddie Velázquez; **Infielders**: 30 Ron Clark; 10 John Donaldson; 18 Gus Gil; 34 Greg Goossen; 21 Tommy Harper; 11 John Kennedy; 14 Gordon Lund; 5 Don Mincher; 1 Ray Oyler; 9 Rich Rollins; 22 Fred Stanley | **Outfielders**: 20 Wayne Comer; 12 Tommy Davis; 14 Jim Gosger; 8 Mike Hegan; 36 Steve Hovley; 16 Dick Simpson; 28 Sandy Valdespino; 25 José Vidal; 12 Danny Walton; 19 Steve Whitaker; 51 Billy Williams; **Other batters**: 26 Mike Ferraro | **Manager**: 3 Joe Schultz; **Coaches**: 2 Frankie Crosetti (Third Base); 4 Sal Maglie (Pitching); 6 Eddie O'Brien (Bullpen); 7 Ron Plaza (First Base); 31 Sibby Sisti (Bench, 8/3 – 10/2) |

=== Game log ===
1969 regular season game log: 64–98 (Home: 34–47; Away: 30–51)
April: 7–11 (Home: 4–5; Away: 3–6)

| # | Date | Opponent | Score | Win | Loss | Save | Attendance | Record | Streak |
|---|---|---|---|---|---|---|---|---|---|
| 1 | April 8 | @ Angels | 4–3 | **Pattin** | McGlothlin | **Aker** | 11,930 | 1–0 | W1 |
| 2 | April 9 | @ Angels | 3–7 | Borbon | **Brabender** | Wilhelm | 5,347 | 1–1 | L1 |
| 3 | April 11 | White Sox | 7–0 | **Bell** | Horlen | — | 14,993 | 2–1 | W1 |
| 4 | April 12 | White Sox | 5–1 | **Segui** | Ellis | **Aker** | 8,319 | 3–1 | W2 |
| 5 | April 13 | White Sox | 7–12 | Wood | **Pattin** | — | 10,031 | 3–2 | L1 |
| 6 | April 14 | Royals | 1–2 | Nelson | **Marshall** | Wickersham | 3,611 | 3–3 | L2 |
| 7 | April 16 | Twins | 4–6 | Perranoski | **Aker** | — | 7,329 | 3–4 | L3 |
| — | April 18 | @ White Sox | **Postponed** (Makeup June 18) | | | | | | |
| 8 | April 19 | @ White Sox | 5–1 | **Pattin** | Peters | **Segui** | 3,901 | 4–4 | W1 |
| 9 | April 20 | @ White Sox | 2–3 (10) | Wood | **Segui** | — | 12,579 | 4–5 | L1 |
| 10 | April 20 | @ White Sox | 3–13 | Horlen | **Barber** | Locker | 12,579 | 4–6 | L2 |
| 11 | April 21 | @ Royals | 4–1 | **Marshall** | Jones | **Aker** | 9,024 | 5–6 | W1 |
| 12 | April 22 | @ Royals | 1–2 | Hedlund | **Segui** | Drabowsky | 9,066 | 5–7 | L1 |
| 13 | April 23 | @ Royals | 3–4 | Morehead | **Edgerton** | — | 10,267 | 5–8 | L2 |
| 14 | April 25 | Athletics | 2–14 | Nash | **Bell** | — | 6,617 | 5–9 | L3 |
| 15 | April 26 | Athletics | 6–3 | **Barber** | Dobson | **Segui** | 6,658 | 6–9 | W1 |
| 16 | April 27 | Athletics | 5–13 | Fingers | **Marshall** | Krausse | 5,802 | 6–10 | L1 |
| — | April 28 | Angels | **Postponed** (Makeup July 9) | | | | | | |
| 17 | April 29 | Angels | 1–0 | **Pattin** | McGlothlin | — | 1,954 | 7–10 | W1 |
| 18 | April 30 | @ Twins | 4–6 | Hall | **Brabender** | Perranoski | 4,087 | 7–11 | L1 |

May: 13–13 (Home: 6–6; Away: 7–7)

| # | Date | Opponent | Score | Win | Loss | Save | Attendance | Record | Streak |
|---|---|---|---|---|---|---|---|---|---|
| 19 | May 1 | @ Twins | 1–4 | Boswell | **Bell** | Grzenda | 6,485 | 7–12 | L2 |
| 20 | May 2 | @ Athletics | 7–8 | Lindblad | **Aker** | — | 4,823 | 7–13 | L3 |
| 21 | May 3 | @ Athletics | 2–3 | Dobson | **Marshall** | — | 4,565 | 7–14 | L4 |
| 22 | May 4 | @ Athletics | 6–4 | **Pattin** | Fingers | **O'Donoghue** | 10,852 | 8–14 | W1 |
| 23 | May 4 | @ Athletics | 7–11 | Odom | **Brandon** | Lindblad | 10,852 | 8–15 | L1 |
| 24 | May 6 | Red Sox | 2–12 | Culp | **Brabender** | — | 9,427 | 8–16 | L2 |
| 25 | May 7 | Red Sox | 4–5 | Siebert | **Bell** | Romo | 7,084 | 8–17 | L3 |
| 26 | May 9 | Senators | 2–0 | **Marshall** | Coleman | — | 7,148 | 9–17 | W1 |
| 27 | May 10 | Senators | 16–13 | **Segui** | Higgins | **Bell** | 7,360 | 10–17 | W2 |
| 28 | May 11 | Senators | 6–5 | **Segui** | Baldwin | — | 14,363 | 11–17 | W3 |
| 29 | May 12 | Yankees | 8–4 | **Pattin** | Downing | — | 8,763 | 12–17 | W4 |
| 30 | May 13 | Yankees | 5–3 | **Bell** | Stottlemyre | **Segui** | 19,072 | 13–17 | W5 |
| 31 | May 14 | Yankees | 4–5 | Burbach | **Marshall** | Bahnsen | 12,273 | 13–18 | L1 |
| 32 | May 16 | @ Red Sox | 10–9 (11) | **Bouton** | Romo | **O'Donoghue** | 33,079 | 14–18 | W1 |
| 33 | May 17 | @ Red Sox | 1–6 | Nagy | **Bell** | — | 21,172 | 14–19 | L1 |
| 34 | May 18 | @ Red Sox | 9–6 | **Marshall** | Culp | **Segui** | 25,125 | 15–19 | W1 |
| 35 | May 20 | @ Senators | 5–6 | Higgins | **Pattin** | — | 6,520 | 15–20 | L1 |
| 36 | May 21 | @ Senators | 6–2 | **Brabender** | Coleman | **Segui** | 6,083 | 16–20 | W1 |
| 37 | May 22 | @ Senators | 7–6 | **Segui** | Higgins | — | 4,242 | 17–20 | W2 |
| 38 | May 23 | @ Indians | 1–7 | Ellsworth | **Marshall** | — | 5.633 | 17–21 | L1 |
| 39 | May 24 | @ Indians | 8–2 | **Talbot** | McDowell | — | 7,094 | 18–21 | W1 |
| 40 | May 25 | @ Indians | 3–2 | **Segui** | Williams | **Bell** | 10,558 | 19–21 | W2 |
| 41 | May 27 | Orioles | 8–1 | **Brabender** | Phoebus | — | 8,308 | 20–21 | W3 |
| 42 | May 28 | Orioles | 5–9 | McNally | **Marshall** | Richert | 21,679 | 20–22 | L1 |
| — | May 29 | Orioles | **Postponed** (Makeup August 18) | | | | | | |
| 43 | May 30 | Tigers | 5–8 | Radatz | **Pattin** | Dobson | 12,084 | 20–23 | L2 |
| 44 | May 31 | Tigers | 2–3 | Sparma | **Bell** | — | 15,395 | 20–24 | L3 |

June: 14–15 (Home: 7–5; Away: 7–10)

| # | Date | Opponent | Score | Win | Loss | Save | Attendance | Record | Streak |
|---|---|---|---|---|---|---|---|---|---|
| 45 | June 1 | Tigers | 8–7 | **Segui** | Dobson | **O'Donoghue** | 14,201 | 21–24 | W1 |
| 46 | June 2 | Indians | 8–2 | **Barber** | Pina | **Bouton** | 9,044 | 22–24 | W2 |
| 47 | June 3 | Indians | 1–3 | Tiant | **Pattin** | Williams | 8,634 | 22–25 | L1 |
| 48 | June 4 | Indians | 4–10 | McDowell | **Marshall** | Williams | 9,540 | 22–26 | L2 |
| 49 | June 6 | @ Orioles | 1–5 | McNally | **Bell** | — | 17,689 | 22–27 | L3 |
| 50 | June 7 | @ Orioles | 0–10 | Palmer | **Brabender** | — | 13,903 | 22–28 | L4 |
| 51 | June 8 | @ Orioles | 7–5 | **O'Donoghue** | Cuellar | — | 8,988 | 23–28 | W1 |
| 52 | June 9 | @ Tigers | 3–2 (10) | **Pattin** | Dobson | Gelnar | 13,477 | 24–28 | W2 |
| 53 | June 10 | @ Tigers | 0–5 | Wilson | **Talbot** | McMahon | 14,033 | 24–29 | L1 |
| 54 | June 11 | @ Tigers | 3–4 (10) | Dobson | **O'Donoghue** | — | 23,569 | 24–30 | L2 |
| 55 | June 13 | @ Yankees | 2–1 | **Brabender** | Stottlemyre | — | 14,967 | 25–30 | W1 |
| 56 | June 14 | @ Yankees | 5–4 | **Gelnar** | McDaniel | **Segui** | 9,214 | 26–30 | W2 |
| 57 | June 15 | @ Yankees | 0–4 (6) | Bahnsen | **Talbot** | — | 58,733 | 26–31 | L1 |
| 58 | June 16 | @ White Sox | 3–8 | Wynne | **Marshall** | — | 13,133 | 26–32 | L2 |
| — | June 17 | @ White Sox | **Postponed** (Rescheduled September 17) | | | | | | |
| 59 | June 18 | @ White Sox | 3–7 | Peters | **Brabender** | — | 6,044 | 26–33 | L3 |
| 60 | June 18 | @ White Sox | 6–5 (11) | **Locker** | Osinski | — | 6,044 | 27–33 | W1 |
| 61 | June 19 | @ White Sox | 10–13 | Wood | **Marshall** | — | 2,318 | 27–34 | L1 |
| 62 | June 20 | Royals | 5–3 | **Talbot** | Butler | **Locker** | 18,413 | 28–34 | W1 |
| 63 | June 20 | Royals | 2–6 | Bunker | **Gelnar** | — | 18,413 | 28–35 | L1 |
| 64 | June 21 | Royals | 1–0 | **Brabender** | Nelson | — | 6,829 | 29–35 | W1 |
| 65 | June 22 | Royals | 5–1 | **Pattin** | Drago | **Locker** | 7,008 | 30–35 | W2 |
| — | June 23 | White Sox | **Postponed** (Rescheduled June 24) | | | | | | |
| 66 | June 24 | White Sox | 4–6 | Wood | **Locker** | — | 7,417 | 30–36 | L1 |
| 67 | June 24 | White Sox | 6–7 | Wood | **Segui** | — | 7,417 | 30–37 | L2 |
| 68 | June 25 | White Sox | 3–1 | **Gelnar** | Edmondson | **Locker** | 5,950 | 31–37 | W1 |
| 69 | June 26 | White Sox | 3–2 | **Brabender** | Horlen | — | 7,109 | 32–37 | W2 |
| 70 | June 27 | @ Angels | 3–5 | Fisher | **Pattin** | — | 9,518 | 32–38 | L1 |
| 71 | June 27 | @ Angels | 5–2 | **Roggenburk** | Washburn | **Locker** | 9,518 | 33–38 | W1 |
| 72 | June 28 | @ Angels | 3–0 | **Talbot** | Murphy | **Segui** | 8,893 | 34–38 | W2 |
| 73 | June 29 | @ Angels | 2–8 | Messersmith | **Gelnar** | Tatum | 7,628 | 34–39 | L1 |

July: 9–20 (Home: 7–11; Away: 2–9)

| # | Date | Opponent | Score | Win | Loss | Save | Attendance | Record | Streak |
|---|---|---|---|---|---|---|---|---|---|
| 74 | July 1 | @ Athletics | 7–1 | **Brabender** | Dobson | — | 5,375 | 35–39 | W1 |
| 75 | July 2 | @ Athletics | 0–5 | Odom | **Pattin** | — | 5,012 | 35–40 | L1 |
| 76 | July 3 | @ Athletics | 4–6 | Krausse | **Roggenburk** | Fingers | 8,290 | 35–41 | L2 |
| 77 | July 4 | @ Royals | 2–13 | Nelson | **Talbot** | — | 12,944 | 35–42 | L3 |
| 78 | July 4 | @ Royals | 2–3 | Drago | **Gelnar** | O'Riley | 12,944 | 35–43 | L4 |
| 79 | July 5 | @ Royals | 4–6 | Burgmeier | **Marshall** | Drabowsky | 10,268 | 35–44 | L5 |
| 80 | July 6 | @ Royals | 9–3 | **Brabender** | Butler | **Segui** | 26,480 | 36–44 | W1 |
| 81 | July 7 | Angels | 1–5 | Messersmith | **Pattin** | — | 6,951 | 36–45 | L1 |
| 82 | July 8 | Angels | 3–1 | **Roggenburk** | McGlothlin | — | 6,877 | 37–45 | W1 |
| 83 | July 9 | Angels | 8–0 | **Talbot** | Wright | — | 8,461 | 38–45 | W2 |
| 84 | July 9 | Angels | 0–5 | Brunet | **Gelnar** | — | 8,461 | 38–46 | L1 |
| — | July 10 | Angels | **Postponed** (Rescheduled September 12) | | | | | | |
| 85 | July 11 | @ Twins | 3–9 | Hall | **Brabender** | — | 19,221 | 38–47 | L2 |
| 86 | July 12 | @ Twins | 1–11 | Perry | **Pattin** | — | 17,616 | 38–48 | L3 |
| 87 | July 13 | @ Twins | 2–5 | Kaat | **Roggenburk** | — | 26,123 | 38–49 | L4 |
| 88 | July 13 | @ Twins | 4–5 | Perranoski | **Segui** | — | 26,123 | 38–50 | L5 |
| 89 | July 15 | Athletics | 2–6 | Odom | **Gelnar** | — | 12,288 | 38–51 | L6 |
| 90 | July 16 | Athletics | 1–6 | Krausse | **Brabender** | — | 8,688 | 38–52 | L7 |
| 91 | July 17 | Athletics | 2–8 | Hunter | **Pattin** | — | 6,793 | 38–53 | L8 |
| 92 | July 18 | Twins | 2–1 | **Segui** | Perranoski | — | 14,134 | 39–53 | W1 |
| 93 | July 18 | Twins | 3–2 | **Talbot** | Boswell | **O'Donoghue** | 14,134 | 40–53 | W2 |
| 94 | July 19–20 | Twins | 7–11 (18) | Perry | **Gelnar** | — | 12,069 | 40–54 | L1 |
| 95 | July 20 | Twins | 0–4 | Perry | **Gelnar** | — | 8,287 | 40–55 | L2 |
| — | July 23 | **40th Major League All-Star Game** | | | | | | | |
| 96 | July 24 | Red Sox | 8–6 | **Brabender** | Jarvis | **O'Donoghue** | 8,395 | 41–55 | W1 |
| 97 | July 25 | Red Sox | 6–7 | Landis | **Gelnar** | Stange | 8,470 | 41–56 | L1 |
| 98 | July 26 | Red Sox | 8–5 | **Bouton** | Kline | **Locker** | 13,632 | 42–56 | W1 |
| 99 | July 27 | Red Sox | 3–5 (20) | Lonborg | **Locker** | — | 9,670 | 42–57 | L1 |
| 100 | July 29 | Senators | 2–4 | Coleman | **Brabender** | — | 14,270 | 42–58 | L2 |
| 101 | July 30 | Senators | 4–3 | **Segui** | Cox | **Gelnar** | 5,721 | 43–58 | W1 |
| 102 | July 31 | Senators | 6–7 | Shellenback | **Talbot** | Knowles | 9,699 | 43–59 | L1 |

August: 6–22 (Home: 0–13; Away: 6–9)

| # | Date | Opponent | Score | Win | Loss | Save | Attendance | Record | Streak |
|---|---|---|---|---|---|---|---|---|---|
| 103 | August 1 | Yankees | 2–4 | Johnson | **Pattin** | — | 7,596 | 43–60 | L2 |
| 104 | August 2 | Yankees | 4–5 | Downing | **Brunet** | **Aker** | 10,755 | 43–61 | L3 |
| 105 | August 3 | Yankees | 3–5 | Bahnsen | **Barber** | McDaniel | 23,657 | 43–62 | L4 |
| 106 | August 5 | @ Red Sox | 9–2 | **Brabender** | Culp | — | 25,977 | 44–62 | W1 |
| 107 | August 6 | @ Red Sox | 6–5 (10) | **Locker** | Romo | — | 22,186 | 45–62 | W2 |
| 108 | August 7 | @ Red Sox | 4–5 | Stange | **Locker** | — | 30,706 | 45–63 | L1 |
| 109 | August 8 | @ Senators | 3–10 | Coleman | **Brunet** | Baldwin | 10,737 | 45–64 | L2 |
| 110 | August 9 | @ Senators | 8–6 | **Locker** | Baldwin | — | 8,482 | 46–64 | W1 |
| 111 | August 10 | @ Senators | 5–7 | Knowles | **Gelnar** | Coleman | 8,442 | 46–65 | L1 |
| 112 | August 11 | @ Indians | 8–2 | **Segui** | Tiant | — | 4,658 | 47–65 | W1 |
| 113 | August 12 | @ Indians | 5–6 | Paul | **Talbot** | Williams | 8,190 | 47–66 | L1 |
| 114 | August 13 | @ Indians | 5–3 | **Brunet** | Hargan | — | 5,494 | 48–66 | W1 |
| 115 | August 15 | Orioles | 1–2 | Cuellar | **Brabender** | — | 9,922 | 48–67 | L1 |
| 116 | August 16 | Orioles | 3–15 | McNally | **Segui** | Hardin | 11,550 | 48–68 | L2 |
| 117 | August 17 | Orioles | 1–4 | Phoebus | **Talbot** | Watt | 10,227 | 48–69 | L3 |
| 118 | August 18 | Orioles | 3–12 | Palmer | **Brunet** | — | 19,770 | 48–70 | L4 |
| 119 | August 19 | Tigers | 3–5 | Kilkenny | **Barber** | Dobson | 5,909 | 48–71 | L5 |
| 120 | August 20 | Tigers | 3–4 | Lolich | **Brabender** | — | 5,577 | 48–72 | L6 |
| 121 | August 21 | Tigers | 6–7 | Hiller | **Bouton** | — | 6,483 | 48–73 | L7 |
| 122 | August 22 | Indians | 8–9 | Hargan | **Talbot** | Williams | 6,720 | 48–74 | L8 |
| 123 | August 23 | Indians | 3–7 | McDowell | **Pattin** | — | 5,469 | 48–75 | L9 |
| 124 | August 24 | Indians | 5–6 | Williams | **Talbot** | Law | 5,900 | 48–76 | L10 |
| 125 | August 26 | @ Orioles | 2–1 | **Brabender** | Phoebus | — | 11,400 | 49–76 | W1 |
| 126 | August 27 | @ Orioles | 2–7 | Cuellar | **Brunet** | — | 8,960 | 49–77 | L1 |
| 127 | August 28 | @ Orioles | 3–4 (11) | Watt | **Womack** | — | 8,118 | 49–78 | L2 |
| 128 | August 29 | @ Tigers | 1–6 | Lolich | **Barber** | — | 16,685 | 49–79 | L3 |
| 129 | August 30 | @ Tigers | 3–4 | McLain | **O'Donoghue** | — | 17,550 | 49–80 | L4 |
| 130 | August 31 | @ Tigers | 2–7 | Wilson | **Brabender** | — | 16,485 | 49–81 | L5 |

September: 14–16 (Home: 9–6; Away: 5–10)

| # | Date | Opponent | Score | Win | Loss | Save | Attendance | Record | Streak |
|---|---|---|---|---|---|---|---|---|---|
| 131 | September 1 | @ Yankees | 1–6 | Stottlemyre | **Brunet** | — | 15,387 | 49–82 | L6 |
| 132 | September 1 | @ Yankees | 5–1 (13) | **Womack** | Hamilton | — | 15,387 | 50–82 | W1 |
| 133 | September 2 | @ Yankees | 4–5 (15) | Bahnsen | **Brabender** | — | 7,071 | 50–83 | L1 |
| 134 | September 4 | Royals | 3–5 | Drago | **Gelnar** | — | 3,958 | 50–84 | L2 |
| 135 | September 5 | Royals | 5–4 | **Brabender** | Drabowsky | **Locker** | 6,903 | 51–84 | W1 |
| 136 | September 6 | Royals | 2–6 | Bunker | **Meyer** | — | 4,744 | 51–85 | L1 |
| 137 | September 7 | Royals | 7–6 (10) | **Segui** | Drabowsky | — | 4,653 | 52–85 | W1 |
| 138 | September 8 | White Sox | 2–1 | **Barber** | Johnson | **Gelnar** | 10,831 | 53–85 | W2 |
| 139 | September 8 | White Sox | 5–1 | **Fuentes** | Peters | — | 10,831 | 54–85 | W3 |
| 140 | September 10 | @ Athletics | 9–4 | **Brabender** | Dobson | **Segui** | 1,945 | 55–85 | W4 |
| 141 | September 11 | @ Athletics | 3–6 | Nash | **Meyer** | Talbot | 1,721 | 55–86 | L1 |
| 142 | September 12 | Angels | 4–1 | **Brunet** | May | — | 5,085 | 56–86 | W1 |
| — | September 12 | Angels | 1–1 (10) | — | — | — | 5,085 | 56–86 | — |
| 143 | September 13 | Angels | 6–4 | **Segui** | Murphy | — | 11,184 | 57–86 | W2 |
| 144 | September 13 | Angels | 2–4 | Fisher | **Fuentes** | Tatum | 11,184 | 57–87 | L1 |
| 145 | September 14 | Angels | 2–4 | Messersmith | **Barber** | — | 4,216 | 57–88 | L2 |
| 146 | September 15 | @ Royals | 3–2 | **Brabender** | Cram | **Segui** | 7,238 | 58–88 | W1 |
| 147 | September 16 | @ Royals | 1–2 | Bunker | **Meyer** | — | 7,282 | 58–89 | L1 |
| 148 | September 17 | @ White Sox | 4–6 | Nyman | **Pattin** | Wood | 3,643 | 58–90 | L2 |
| 149 | September 17 | @ White Sox | 1–2 | Wynne | **Lockwood** | — | 3,643 | 58–91 | L3 |
| 150 | September 19 | @ Twins | 1–2 | Boswell | **Barber** | — | 23,700 | 58–92 | L4 |
| 151 | September 20 | @ Twins | 2–3 | Perry | **Segui** | — | 12,797 | 58–93 | L5 |
| 152 | September 21 | @ Twins | 4–3 | **O'Donoghue** | Kaat | — | 15,443 | 59–93 | W1 |
| 153 | September 22 | @ Angels | 5–4 | **Womack** | Messersmith | **Segui** | 5,158 | 60–93 | W2 |
| 154 | September 23 | @ Angels | 4–5 | Tatum | **Fuentes** | — | 5,400 | 60–94 | L1 |
| 155 | September 24 | @ Angels | 1–3 | May | **Brabender** | — | 5,728 | 60–95 | L2 |
| 156 | September 25 | Twins | 5–1 | **Barber** | Kaat | **O'Donoghue** | 3,642 | 61–95 | W1 |
| 157 | September 26 | Twins | 4–3 (14) | **Gelnar** | Hall | — | 6,586 | 62–95 | W2 |
| — | September 27 | Twins | **Postponed** (Rescheduled September 28) | | | | | | |
| 158 | September 28 | Twins | 2–5 | Boswell | **Fuentes** | Perranoski | 8,096 | 62–96 | L1 |
| 159 | September 28 | Twins | 4–1 | **Baney** | Miller | **Segui** | 8,096 | 63–96 | W1 |
| 160 | September 30 | Athletics | 4–8 | Dobson | **Brabender** | Krausse | 2,937 | 63–97 | L1 |

October: 1–1 (Home: 1–1; Away: 0–0)

| # | Date | Opponent | Score | Win | Loss | Save | Attendance | Record | Streak |
|---|---|---|---|---|---|---|---|---|---|
| 161 | October 1 | Athletics | 4–3 | **Segui** | Lindblad | — | 3,612 | 64–97 | W1 |
| 162 | October 2 | Athletics | 1–3 | Roland | **Barber** | — | 5,473 | 64–98 | L1 |

Legend: = Win = Loss = Postponement/Tie
Bold = Pilots team member

== Player stats ==
| = Indicates team leader |

| = Indicates league leader |

=== Batting ===
==== Starters by position ====
Note: Pos = Position; G = Games played; AB = At bats; H = Hits; Avg. = Batting average; HR = Home runs; RBI = Runs batted in; SB = Stolen bases

| Pos | Player | G | AB | H | Avg. | HR | RBI | SB |
|---|---|---|---|---|---|---|---|---|
| C | Jerry McNertney | 128 | 410 | 99 | .241 | 8 | 55 | 1 |
| 1B | Don Mincher | 140 | 427 | 105 | .246 | 25 | 78 | 10 |
| 2B | John Donaldson | 95 | 338 | 79 | .234 | 1 | 19 | 6 |
| 3B | Tommy Harper | 148 | 537 | 126 | .235 | 9 | 41 | 73 |
| SS | Ray Oyler | 106 | 255 | 42 | .165 | 7 | 22 | 1 |
| LF | Tommy Davis | 123 | 454 | 123 | .271 | 6 | 80 | 19 |
| CF | Wayne Comer | 147 | 481 | 118 | .245 | 15 | 54 | 18 |
| RF | Mike Hegan | 95 | 267 | 78 | .292 | 8 | 37 | 6 |

==== Other batters ====
Note: G = Games played; AB = At bats; H = Hits; Avg. = Batting average; HR = Home runs; RBI = Runs batted in

| Player | G | AB | H | Avg. | HR | RBI |
|---|---|---|---|---|---|---|
| Steve Hovley | 91 | 329 | 91 | .277 | 3 | 20 |
| Gus Gil | 92 | 221 | 49 | .222 | 0 | 17 |
| Rich Rollins | 58 | 187 | 42 | .225 | 4 | 21 |
| Ron Clark | 57 | 163 | 32 | .196 | 0 | 12 |
| Greg Goossen | 52 | 139 | 43 | .309 | 10 | 24 |
| John Kennedy | 61 | 128 | 30 | .234 | 4 | 14 |
| Steve Whitaker | 69 | 116 | 29 | .250 | 6 | 13 |
| Jim Pagliaroni | 40 | 110 | 29 | .264 | 5 | 14 |
| Danny Walton | 23 | 92 | 20 | .217 | 3 | 10 |
| Merritt Ranew | 54 | 81 | 20 | .247 | 0 | 4 |
| Larry Haney | 22 | 59 | 15 | .254 | 2 | 7 |
| Jim Gosger | 39 | 55 | 6 | .109 | 1 | 7 |
| Dick Simpson | 26 | 51 | 9 | .176 | 2 | 5 |
| Fred Stanley | 17 | 43 | 12 | .279 | 0 | 4 |
| Gordy Lund | 20 | 38 | 10 | .263 | 0 | 1 |
| Sandy Valdespino | 20 | 38 | 8 | .211 | 0 | 0 |
| José Vidal | 18 | 26 | 5 | .192 | 1 | 2 |
| Freddie Velázquez | 6 | 16 | 2 | .125 | 0 | 2 |
| Billy Williams | 4 | 10 | 0 | .000 | 0 | 0 |
| Mike Ferraro | 5 | 4 | 0 | .000 | 0 | 0 |

=== Pitching ===
==== Starting pitchers ====
Note: G = Games pitched; IP = Innings pitched; W = Wins; L = Losses; ERA = Earned run average; SO = Strikeouts

| Player | G | IP | W | L | ERA | SO |
|---|---|---|---|---|---|---|
| Gene Brabender | 40 | 202.1 | 13 | 14 | 4.36 | 139 |
| Marty Pattin | 34 | 158.2 | 7 | 12 | 5.62 | 126 |
| Mike Marshall | 20 | 87.2 | 3 | 10 | 5.13 | 47 |
| George Brunet | 12 | 63.2 | 2 | 5 | 5.37 | 37 |
| Gary Bell | 13 | 61.1 | 2 | 6 | 4.70 | 30 |
| Bob Meyer | 6 | 32.2 | 0 | 3 | 3.31 | 17 |
| Gary Timberlake | 2 | 6.0 | 0 | 0 | 7.50 | 4 |

==== Other pitchers ====
Note: G = Games pitched; IP = Innings pitched; W = Wins; L = Losses; SV = Saves; ERA = Earned run average; SO = Strikeouts

| Player | G | IP | W | L | SV | ERA | SO |
|---|---|---|---|---|---|---|---|
| Fred Talbot | 25 | 114.2 | 5 | 8 | 0 | 4.16 | 67 |
| John Gelnar | 39 | 108.2 | 3 | 10 | 3 | 3.31 | 69 |
| Steve Barber | 25 | 86.1 | 4 | 7 | 0 | 4.80 | 69 |
| Miguel Fuentes | 8 | 26.0 | 1 | 3 | 0 | 5.19 | 14 |
| Garry Roggenburk | 7 | 24.1 | 2 | 2 | 0 | 4.44 | 11 |
| Skip Lockwood | 6 | 23.0 | 0 | 1 | 0 | 3.52 | 10 |

==== Relief pitchers ====
Note: G = Games pitched; IP = Innings pitched; W = Wins; L = Losses; SV = Saves; ERA = Earned run average; SO = Strikeouts

| Player | G | IP | W | L | SV | ERA | SO |
|---|---|---|---|---|---|---|---|
| Diego Seguí | 66 | 142.1 | 12 | 6 | 12 | 3.35 | 113 |
| Jim Bouton | 57 | 92.0 | 2 | 1 | 1 | 3.91 | 68 |
| John O'Donoghue | 55 | 70.0 | 2 | 2 | 6 | 2.96 | 48 |
| Bob Locker | 51 | 78.1 | 3 | 3 | 6 | 2.18 | 46 |
| Jack Aker | 15 | 16.2 | 0 | 2 | 3 | 7.56 | 7 |
| Dick Baney | 9 | 18.2 | 1 | 0 | 0 | 3.86 | 9 |
| Dooley Womack | 9 | 14.1 | 2 | 1 | 0 | 2.51 | 8 |
| Bucky Brandon | 8 | 15.0 | 0 | 1 | 0 | 8.40 | 10 |
| John Morris | 6 | 12.2 | 0 | 0 | 0 | 6.39 | 8 |
| Bill Edgerton | 4 | 4.0 | 0 | 1 | 0 | 13.50 | 2 |
| Jerry Stephenson | 2 | 2.2 | 0 | 0 | 0 | 10.12 | 1 |
| Dick Bates | 1 | 1.2 | 0 | 0 | 0 | 26.99 | 3 |

== Farm system ==
The Pilots' farm system consisted of four minor league affiliates in 1969. The Triple-A Vancouver Mounties were shared with the Montreal Expos.

| Level | Team | League | Manager |
|---|---|---|---|
| Triple-A | Vancouver Mounties | Pacific Coast League | Bob Lemon |
| Class A | Clinton Pilots | Midwest League | Sibby Sisti, Karl Kuehl, and Tommy Giordano |
| Class A Short Season | Newark Co-Pilots | New York–Penn League | Earl Torgeson |
| Rookie | Billings Mustangs | Pioneer League | Bob Mavis and Roland LeBlanc |

== Awards and honors ==
1969 Major League Baseball All-Star Game

- Don Mincher
- Mike Hegan (reserve, did not play)
