= 1967 Cleveland Indians season =

1967 Cleveland Indians
- League: American League
- Ballpark: Cleveland Municipal Stadium
- City: Cleveland, Ohio
- Owners: Vernon Stouffer
- General managers: Gabe Paul
- Managers: Joe Adcock
- Television: WJW-TV (Harry Jones, Herb Score)
- Radio: WERE (Jimmy Dudley, Bob Neal)

The 1967 Cleveland Indians season was a season in American baseball. The team finished eighth in the American League with a record of 75–87, 17 games behind the Boston Red Sox.

== Offseason ==
- October 12, 1966: Floyd Weaver was traded by the Indians to the New York Mets for Lou Klimchock and Ernie Bowman.
- January 4, 1967: Jim Landis, Jim Weaver, and Doc Edwards were traded by the Indians to the Houston Astros for Lee Maye and Ken Retzer.

== Regular season ==
=== Season standings ===
American League
Team	W	L	Pct.	GB	Home	Road
Boston Red Sox	92	70	.568	—	49‍–‍32	43‍–‍38
Detroit Tigers	91	71	.562	1	52‍–‍29	39‍–‍42
Minnesota Twins	91	71	.562	1	52‍–‍29	39‍–‍42
Chicago White Sox	89	73	.549	3	49‍–‍33	40‍–‍40
California Angels	84	77	.522	7½	53‍–‍30	31‍–‍47
Washington Senators	76	85	.472	15½	40‍–‍40	36‍–‍45
Baltimore Orioles	76	85	.472	15½	35‍–‍42	41‍–‍43
Cleveland Indians	75	87	.463	17	36‍–‍45	39‍–‍42
New York Yankees	72	90	.444	20	43‍–‍38	29‍–‍52
Kansas City Athletics	62	99	.385	29½	37‍–‍44	25‍–‍55

=== Record vs. opponents ===
1967 American League record Sources:
Team	BAL	BOS	CAL	CWS	CLE	DET	KCA	MIN	NYY	WAS
Baltimore	—	10–8	6–11	7–11	9–9	3–15	10–8	8–10	13–5	10–8
Boston	8–10	—	10–8	8–10	13–5	11–7	12–6	7–11	12–6	11–7
California	11–6	8–10	—	7–11	14–4	8–10	14–4	7–11	9–9	6–12
Chicago	11–7	10–8	11–7	—	12–6	8–10	8–10	9–9	12–6	8–10
Cleveland	9–9	5–13	4–14	6–12	—	8–10	11–7	10–8	9–9	13–5
Detroit	15–3	7–11	10–8	10–8	10–8	—	12–6	8–10–1	10–8	9–9
Kansas City	8–10	6–12	4–14	10–8	7–11	6–12	—	8–10	7–11	6–11
Minnesota	10–8	11–7	11–7	9–9	8–10	10–8–1	10–8	—	12–6–1	10–8
New York	5–13	6–12	9–9	6–12	9–9	8–10	11–7	6–12–1	—	12–6
Washington	8–10	7–11	12–6	10–8	5–13	9–9	11–6	8–10	6–12	—

=== Notable transactions ===
- July 20, 1967: Gary Kroll was purchased by the Indians from the Houston Astros.
- September 4, 1967: Jim Kern was signed as an amateur free agent by the Indians.

=== Opening Day Lineup ===
Opening Day Starters
#	Name	Position
25	Vic Davalillo	CF
10	Max Alvis	3B
27	Leon Wagner	LF
15	Fred Whitfield	1B
23	Chuck Hinton	RF
18	Gus Gil	2B
9	Duke Sims	C
16	Larry Brown	SS
48	Sam McDowell	P

=== Roster ===
1967 Cleveland Indians
Roster
Pitchers: 36 Bob Allen; 37 Steve Bailey; 39 Gary Bell; 39 Ed Connolly; 40 George Culver; 34 Steve Hargan; 45 Tom Kelley; 31 Jack Kralick; 48 Sam McDowell; 32 John O'Donoghue; 31 Orlando Peña; 46 Dick Radatz; 42 Sonny Siebert; 33 Luis Tiant; 41 Bobby Tiefenauer; 35 Stan Williams	Catchers: 7 Joe Azcue; 8 Ray Fosse; 9 Duke Sims; Infielders: 10 Max Alvis; 16 Larry Brown; 13 Vern Fuller; 18 Gus Gil; 24 Pedro González; 11 Tony Horton; 22 Gordy Lund; 15 Fred Whitfield	Outfielders: 21 Rocky Colavito; 25 Vic Davalillo; 20 Don Demeter; 23 Chuck Hinton; 21 Jim King; 26 Lee Maye; 17 Chico Salmon; 28 Richie Scheinblum; 22 Willie Smith; 29 José Vidal; 27 Leon Wagner	Manager: 6 Joe Adcock; Coaches: 2 Clay Bryant (Pitching); 4 Pat Mullin (Hitting); 5 Del Rice (First Base); 3 George Strickland (Third Base)

== Player stats ==
=== Batting ===
==== Starters by position ====
Note: Pos = Position; G = Games played; AB = At bats; H = Hits; Avg. = Batting average; HR = Home runs; RBI = Runs batted in

Pos	Player	G	AB	H	Avg.	HR	RBI
C	Joe Azcue	86	295	74	.251	11	34
1B	Tony Horton	106	363	102	.281	10	44
2B	Vern Fuller	73	206	46	.223	7	21
SS	Larry Brown	152	485	110	.227	7	37
3B	Max Alvis	161	637	163	.256	21	70
LF	Leon Wagner	135	433	105	.242	15	54
CF	Vic Davalillo	139	359	103	.287	2	22
RF	Chuck Hinton	147	498	122	.245	10	37

==== Other batters ====
Note: G = Games played; AB = At bats; H = Hits; Avg. = Batting average; HR = Home runs; RBI = Runs batted in

Player	G	AB	H	Avg.	HR	RBI
Lee Maye	115	297	77	.259	9	27
Duke Sims	88	272	55	.202	12	37
Fred Whitfield	100	257	56	.218	9	31
Chico Salmon	90	203	46	.227	2	19
Rocky Colavito	63	191	46	.241	5	21
Pedro González	80	189	43	.228	1	8
Don Demeter	51	121	25	.207	5	12
Gus Gil	51	96	11	.115	0	5
Richie Scheinblum	18	66	21	.318	0	6
José Vidal	16	34	4	.118	0	0
Willie Smith	21	32	7	.219	0	2
Jim King	19	21	3	.143	0	0
Ray Fosse	7	16	1	.063	0	0
Gordy Lund	3	8	2	.250	0	0

=== Pitching ===
==== Starting pitchers ====
Note: G = Games pitched; IP = Innings pitched; W = Wins; L = Losses; ERA = Earned run average; SO = Strikeouts

Player	G	IP	W	L	ERA	SO
Sam McDowell	37	236.1	13	15	3.85	236
Steve Hargan	30	223.0	14	13	2.62	141
Luis Tiant	33	213.2	12	9	2.74	219
Sonny Siebert	34	185.1	10	12	2.38	136
Gary Bell	9	60.2	1	5	3.71	39

==== Other pitchers ====
Note: G = Games pitched; IP = Innings pitched; W = Wins; L = Losses; ERA = Earned run average; SO = Strikeouts

Player	G	IP	W	L	ERA	SO
John O'Donoghue	33	130.2	8	9	3.24	81
Stan Williams	16	79.0	6	4	2.62	75
Ed Connolly	15	49.1	2	1	7.48	45

==== Relief pitchers ====
Note: G = Games pitched; W = Wins; L = Losses; SV = Saves; ERA = Earned run average; SO = Strikeouts

Player	G	W	L	SV	ERA	SO
Orlando Peña	48	0	3	8	3.36	72
George Culver	53	7	3	3	3.96	41
Bob Allen	47	0	5	5	2.98	50
Steve Bailey	32	2	5	2	3.90	46
Bobby Tiefenauer	5	0	1	0	0.79	6
Dick Radatz	3	0	0	0	6.00	1
Jack Kralick	2	0	2	0	9.00	1
Tom Kelley	1	0	0	0	0.00	0

== Farm system ==
Level	Team	League	Manager
AAA	Portland Beavers	Pacific Coast League	Johnny Lipon
AA	Pawtucket Indians	Eastern League	Red Davis
A	Reno Silver Sox	California League	Phil Cavarretta
A	Rock Hill Indians	Western Carolinas League	Pinky May
Rookie	GCL Indians	Gulf Coast League	Gordon Seyfried
