= Freddie Velázquez =

Dominican baseball player (1937–2019)

- Catcher
- Born: December 6, 1937; Santo Domingo, Dominican Republic
- Died: May 21, 2019 (aged 81); Villa Altagracia, San Cristóbal DR
- Batted: Right Threw: Right

MLB debut
- April 20, 1969, for the Seattle Pilots

Last MLB appearance
- September 30, 1973, for the Atlanta Braves

MLB statistics
- Batting average: .256
- Runs: 3
- Runs batted in: 5
- Stats at Baseball Reference

Teams
- Seattle Pilots (1969); Atlanta Braves (1973)

Federico Antonio Velázquez Velásquez (December 6, 1937 – May 21, 2019) was a Dominican professional baseball catcher who played in Major League Baseball (MLB) for the Seattle Pilots (1969) and Atlanta Braves (1973).

== Career ==
Born in Santo Domingo, Dominican Republic, Velázquez was the first Dominican catcher to play in the major leagues. He was signed originally to a minor-league contract in 1958 by San Francisco Giants scout Horacio Martínez, who had also signed Juan Marichal, Manny Mota and the three Alou brothers: Felipe, Matty and Jesús. He played just one season for the Giants organization in the same year, appearing in 102 games for the Class-D Panama City Fliers and was released by the Giants after the season.

Afterwards, Velázquez played only winterball in the Dominican League until he was signed by the Kansas City Athletics prior to the 1964 season. He stayed with the Athletics until 1968, playing mainly in A-ball, appearing in more than 100 games three times in those five years, but he batted fairly well and hit 43 home runs overall, including 16 homers in 1968. The San Diego Padres acquired Velázquez in the winter of 1968, but he was officially with the organization for about two months before he was picked up by the expansion Pilots on December 2. While at Seattle, the 31-year-old rookie formed part of a five-catcher tandem and was used sparingly.

He later bounced around the minors, playing briefly in the Montreal Expos organization before joining the Braves. Velázquez stayed in the Atlanta minor-league system until their MLB catcher Johnny Oates was injured in 1973. Now in his age 35 season, Velázquez was brought up for his second cup of coffee in the majors. At the time, he was leading the Double-A Southern League in home runs (18) and runs batted in (64) prior to his promotion. But he excelled in limited opportunities with the Braves, with a .348 batting average (8-for-23) in 15 games.

Velázquez returned to Double-A Savannah Braves in 1973, when enjoyed his most productive season in the minors with a .293/.325/.498 slash line, 21 homers and 83 RBI in 117 games. He opened 1976 with Savannah and gained a promotion to Triple-A Richmond Braves late in the year, his last season in the minors.

Velázquez appeared in a total of 21 major league games, being a starter in eight of his sixteen catching appearances. Defensively, he handled 66 out of 67 chances successfully for a fielding percentage of .985. At the plate, he posted a .256 average (10-for-39), including three doubles, three runs scored and five RBI.

In a 14-year minor league career, he hit .262 with 172 home runs and 699 RBI in 1,266 games.

Besides, Velázquez spent 19 seasons in the Dominican Winter League, while playing 14 of them with the Leones del Escogido (1957–71; 1977–78) and five for the Tigres del Licey (1973–77) in between. In 1993, he gained induction in the Dominican Sports Hall of Fame (Pabellón de la Fama del Deporte Dominicano).

Velázquez died in 2019 in Villa Altagracia, San Cristóbal DR at the age of 81.

== Quotes ==
According to R.I.P. Baseball website, Velázquez almost did not play baseball at all. He said in a 1973 profile that he could have been a doctor, but instead he decided that there was no money in it. In fact, Velázquez spent most of hit time in the majors waiting for something to happen.

- “I mean it,” Velázquez told Atlanta Constitution writer Frank Hyland in an interview. “Unless you come from a rich family, there isn't any money in medicine in my country. Maybe $300 a month, that's all. You work and study maybe 15 years and that's all the money.”
- "Gary (Bell) has come up with a good nickname for Freddie Velázquez. Freddie just sits there in the bullpen, warming up pitchers, and he never gets into a game and just looks sad. So Gary calls him Poor Devil." – Jim Bouton, former MLB pitcher, in his dairy book Ball Four.
