= Max Soriano =

Max Soriano (October 31, 1925 – September 15, 2012) was part-owner of the Seattle Pilots, a Major League Baseball team based in Seattle, Washington that played during the 1969 season. His brother, Dewey Soriano, also had a stake in the team.

Soriano was born in Prince Rupert, British Columbia. He attended Franklin High School and later played for the University of Washington Huskies baseball team. The San Francisco Seals of the Pacific Coast League sought to sign him, however, he turned down the contract and attended law school instead.

During World War II, Soriano served in the Merchant Marines. He later served in the Korean War.

After the Pilots moved to Milwaukee to become the Milwaukee Brewers, Soriano began a shipping company.

He died in Seattle.
