= Gordon Lund =

American baseball player (1941–2024)

- Shortstop / Second baseman / Third baseman
- Born: February 23, 1941; Iron Mountain, Michigan, U.S.
- Died: April 10, 2024 (aged 83); Arlington Heights, Illinois, U.S.
- Batted: Right Threw: Right

MLB debut
- August 1, 1967, for the Cleveland Indians

Last MLB appearance
- August 8, 1969, for the Seattle Pilots

MLB statistics
- Batting average: .261
- Hits: 12
- Runs batted in: 1
- Stats at Baseball Reference

Teams
- Cleveland Indians (1967); Seattle Pilots (1969)

Gordon Thomas Lund (February 23, 1941 – April 10, 2024) was an American Major League Baseball shortstop, second baseman and third baseman. He stood 5 ft 11 in (180 cm) tall and weighed 170 pounds (77 kg). During his two-season Major League career, Lund batted .261, with 12 hits, no home runs, and one run batted in.

Lund was an adept defensive player who spent almost his entire 11-year playing career in minor league baseball (1960–1970). He signed with the Cleveland Indians and in his 1960 rookie season led Florida State League shortstops in putouts. The following year, he led Carolina League shortstops in double plays and fielding percentage. But Lund did not reach Cleveland until August 1, 1967, and received only a three-game trial with the Indians before being acquired along with John O'Donoghue by the Baltimore Orioles for Eddie Fisher and minor leaguers Johnny Scruggs and Bob Scott on November 28, 1967. Lund along with Gene Brabender was traded from the Orioles to the Seattle Pilots for Chico Salmon on March 31, 1969. He appeared in 20 games with the Pilots in 1969, 17 at shortstop, batting .263 with one RBI. Despite his fielding prowess as a minor leaguer, in the Majors he made six errors in 61 total chances at shortstop, as well as one error in three chances as a second baseman, for a poor .891 fielding average overall.

From 1974 to 1982, Lund managed in the Chicago White Sox farm system from the Class A to the Triple-A levels. He compiled a won–loss mark of 608–615 (.497). His 1978 Appleton Foxes won the Midwest League championship.

Lund died on April 10, 2024, in Arlington Heights, Illinois.

== See also ==
- 1967 Cleveland Indians season
- 1969 Seattle Pilots season
