= Ron Plaza =

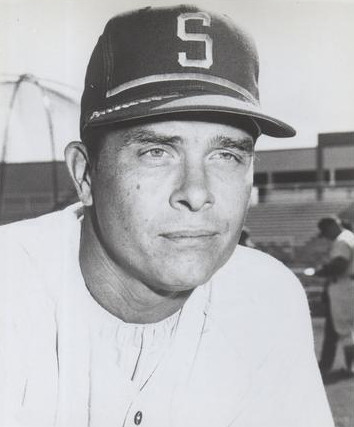
- Plaza in 1969
- Third baseman
- Born: August 24, 1934; Clifton, New Jersey, U.S.
- Died: April 15, 2012 (aged 77); Largo, Florida, U.S.
- Batted: Left Threw: Right

MiLB statistics
- Seasons: 11
- Batting average: .251
- Home runs: 65
- Stats at Baseball Reference

Teams
- As manager (minors): Billings Mustangs (1963); Winnipeg Goldeyes (1964); Cedar Rapids Cardinals (1965–1966); St. Petersburg Cardinals (1967–1968); Gulf Coast League Reds (1970–1973); Trois-Rivières Aigles (1975); As MLB coach: Seattle Pilots (1969); Cincinnati Reds (1978–1983); Oakland Athletics (1986)

Ronald Charles Plaza (August 24, 1934 – April 15, 2012) was an American professional baseball player, coach and manager. Though he never made it to Major League Baseball as a player, he was a coach at the MLB level for the Seattle Pilots, Cincinnati Reds and Oakland Athletics. Later in life, he resided in St. Petersburg, Florida, and worked with the Athletics as a scout and coach for their minor league operations.

== Career ==
Born in Clifton, New Jersey, Plaza joined the Johnson City Cardinals in 1951 at just 16 years old, and batted .302 with four home runs and 34 runs batted in (RBI) in 56 games. In 1953, with the Hamilton Cardinals, he led the Pennsylvania–Ontario–New York League with 37 doubles, was third in the league with 106 RBI and was fifth in the league in walks. He also committed a league-leading 37 errors at third base.

Plaza shifted to second base with the Rochester Red Wings in 1956, and batted .297 with five home runs and 30 RBI in 121 games during his first season in Triple-A. His batting average slipped to .221 his second season with Rochester, however, he hit a career-high 14 home runs and had 49 RBI in 144 games.

He wrapped up an eleven-year playing career (all in the St. Louis Cardinals organization) in 1962 with the Atlanta Crackers, and immediately moved into coaching. He managed the 1963 Billings Mustangs to the Pioneer League finals his first season as a coach, and won the Florida State League championship in 1967 with the St. Petersburg Cardinals.

Plaza's first major league coaching job was the first base and hitting coach for the Seattle Pilots in 1969. Pilots General Manager Marvin Milkes let Plaza go along with the rest of the coaching staff as the team struggled with bankruptcy and a host of other issues after completing their one and only season in Major League Baseball. His term with the Pilots earned him mention in Jim Bouton's book Ball Four, as "The Drill Instructor."

Plaza coached in the Cincinnati Reds' farm system following his stint in Seattle, and joined the big league club following the 1977 season. After succeeding Alex Grammas as Cincinnati's third base coach in 1979, he was shifted to first base coach in June of 1979 by manager John McNamara because of Reds' baserunners being thrown out at home plate after being waved in by Plaza.

== See also ==
- 1969 Seattle Pilots season

Preceded by Franchise established	Seattle Pilots first base coach 1969	Succeeded by Roy McMillan (Milwaukee Brewers)
Preceded by Alex Grammas	Cincinnati Reds third base coach 1979	Succeeded by Russ Nixon
