= Gary Timberlake =

American baseball player (born 1948)

- Pitcher
- Born: August 8, 1948 (age 77); Laconia, Indiana, U.S.
- Batted: Right Threw: Left

MLB debut
- June 18, 1969, for the Seattle Pilots

Last MLB appearance
- June 24, 1969, for the Seattle Pilots

MLB statistics
- Win–loss record: 0–0
- Earned run average: 7.50
- Strikeouts: 4
- Stats at Baseball Reference

Teams
- Seattle Pilots (1969)

Gary Dale Timberlake (born August 9, 1948) is an American former professional baseball pitcher. He appeared in two games for the 1969 Seattle Pilots of Major League Baseball (MLB). Listed at 6 feet 2 inches (1.88 m) and 205 pounds (93 kg), he threw left-handed and batted right-handed.

== Biography ==
Timberlake was born in Laconia, Indiana. He attended Western Kentucky University.

The New York Yankees selected Timbelake in the second round (30th overall) of the 1966 MLB draft. His minor league baseball career spanned 1966 to 1975; he appeared in 177 games (103 starts) with a 45–40 win-loss record, four saves and a 4.08 ERA.

In October 1968, Timberlake was selected by the Seattle Pilots from the Yankees as the 48th pick in the 1968 MLB expansion draft. His major league career lasted about one week, as he was the starting pitcher in two games, on June 18 and 24, 1969, for the Pilots against the Chicago White Sox. Days later, he was called to military service; aged 20, he was summoned to serve six months of active duty with his Army Reserve unit. In his brief MLB career, Timberlake allowed 16 baserunners (via seven hits and nine walks) and five earned runs in six total innings pitched. He recorded a 0–0 record with four strikeouts and a 7.50 earned run average (ERA). After the 1970 season, the Brewers traded Timberlake to the Oakland Athletics for Bill McNulty.

After leaving baseball worked for a chemical company. As of 2006, he resided in Louisville, Kentucky.
