= Garry Roggenburk =

American baseball player (born 1940)

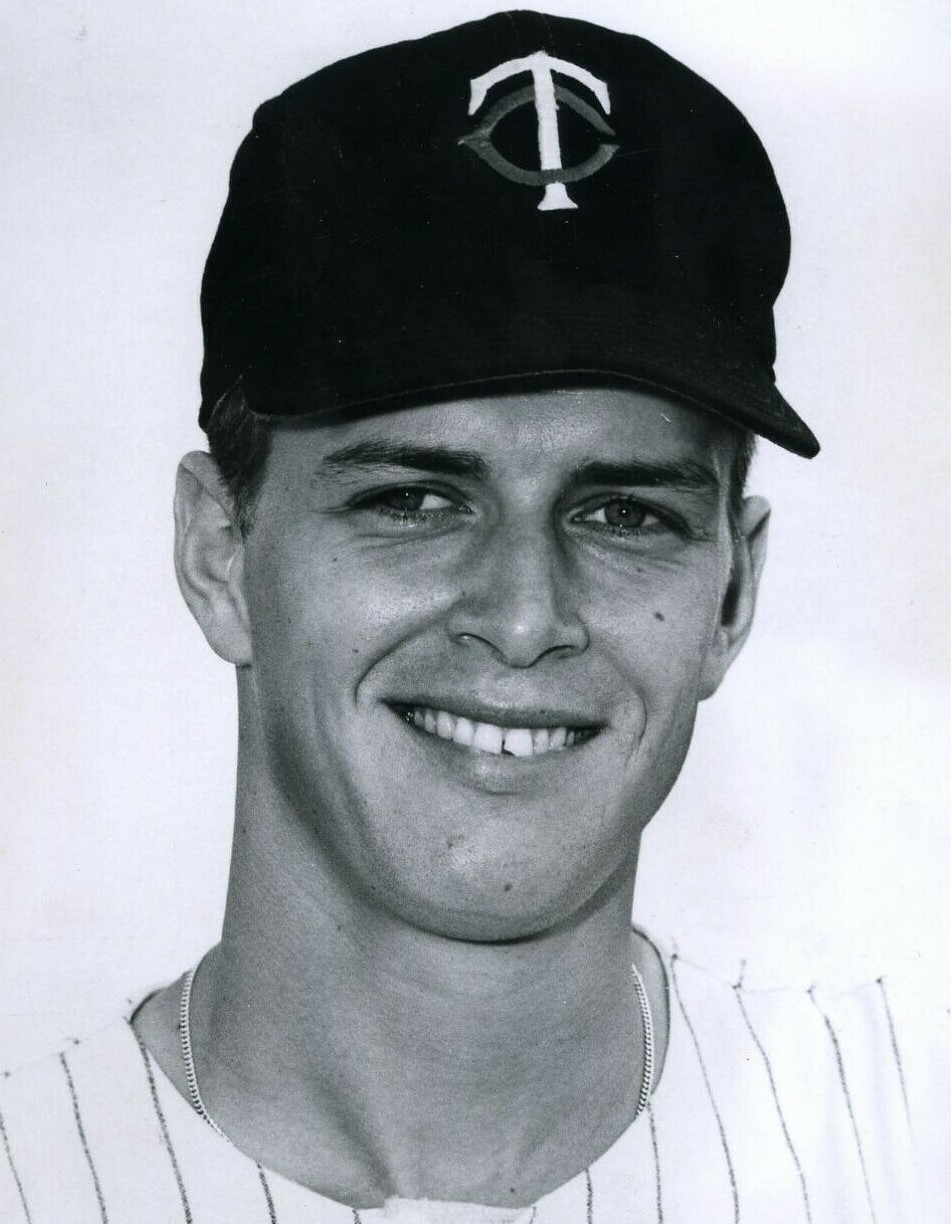
- Pitcher
- Born: April 16, 1940 (age 86); Cleveland, Ohio, U.S.
- Batted: Right Threw: Left

MLB debut
- April 20, 1963, for the Minnesota Twins

Last MLB appearance
- July 27, 1969, for the Seattle Pilots

MLB statistics
- Win–loss record: 6–9
- Earned run average: 3.64
- Strikeouts: 56
- Stats at Baseball Reference

Teams
- Minnesota Twins (1963, 1965–1966); Boston Red Sox (1967–1969); Seattle Pilots (1969)

Garry Earl Roggenburk (/ˈroʊɡɛnbɜːrk/ ROH-gen-burk; born April 16, 1940) is an American former Major League Baseball pitcher. The left-hander was listed as a lanky 6 feet 6 inches (1.98 m) tall and 195 pounds (88 kg). Born in Cleveland, Ohio, he was a high school teammate of Mike Hegan's at Saint Ignatius High School. The two would later be teammates with the 1969 Seattle Pilots.

Roggenburk attended the University of Dayton, where he played college baseball and starred in basketball, leading Dayton to the 1962 National Invitation Tournament championship. He entered professional baseball in 1962 when he was signed by the Minnesota Twins. He was also selected in the fourth round (34th overall) of the 1962 NBA draft by the San Francisco Warriors.

== Major League Baseball career ==
Roggenburk made his Major League debut on April 20, 1963, with the Twins, playing against the Chicago White Sox at Comiskey Park with 7,137 people attending the game. Roggenburk was called to replace Bill Dailey in the sixth inning. He pitched only 1/3 of an inning while walking one batter and allowing one run. Roggenburk was then replaced by Frank Sullivan, who surrendered a two-run home run to Dave Nicholson, one of those earned runs charged against Roggenburk. The Twins lost the game 10–7 in the tenth inning, with Roggenburk getting a no-decision.

Roggenburk appeared in 60 games for the Twins over parts of three seasons before being purchased by the Boston Red Sox on September 7, 1966. After finishing 1966 with Boston, he appeared in portions of the 1968 and 1969 seasons for the Red Sox, then was purchased by Seattle Pilots on June 23, 1969. He worked in 12 total games for Boston and seven for Seattle.

In 79 MLB appearances, 73 of them as a relief pitcher, he fashioned a 6–9 won–lost record, with a 3.64 earned run average and seven saves. Four of his six starting pitcher assignments came with the 1969 Pilots. He threw his only MLB complete game July 8 against the California Angels, a five-hit, 3–1 Seattle victory at Sicks Stadium. In 126 big-league innings pitched, he surrendered 132 hits and 64 walks; he struck out 56.

== Activity after retirement ==
After Roggenburk's playing career ended, Roggenburk became the head coach of the Cleveland State baseball team from 1972 to 1978, then a pitching coach in the Red Sox' minor-league system, and later became general manager (GM) from 1978 to 1983 for the Winter Haven Red Sox, Boston's affiliate in the Class A Florida State League. After leaving baseball, he returned to Cleveland and he worked as a real-estate appraiser. As of 2014, Roggenburk was living in Avon, Ohio.
