= Gus Gil =

Venezuelan baseball player (1939–2015)

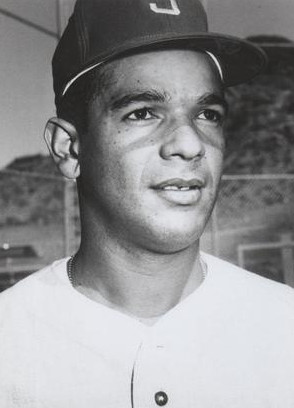
- Gil in 1969
- Infielder
- Born: April 19, 1939; Caracas, Venezuela
- Died: December 8, 2015 (aged 76); Phoenix, Arizona, U.S.
- Batted: Right Threw: Right

MLB debut
- April 11, 1967, for the Cleveland Indians

Last MLB appearance
- June 30, 1971, for the Milwaukee Brewers

MLB statistics
- Batting average: .186
- Home runs: 1
- Runs batted in: 37
- Stats at Baseball Reference

Teams
- MLB: Cleveland Indians (1967); Seattle Pilots / Milwaukee Brewers (1969–1971)

Member of the Venezuelan

Baseball Hall of Fame
- Induction: 2008
Medals
Men's baseball
Representing Venezuela
Central American and Caribbean Games
| Silver medal – second place | 1959 Caracas | Team |

Tomás Gustavo Gil Guillén (April 19, 1939 – December 8, 2015) was a Venezuelan professional baseball player, coach, manager, and scout. He played in Major League Baseball as a second baseman for the Cleveland Indians (1967) and Seattle Pilots / Milwaukee Brewers (1969–1971). He also played 19 seasons in the Venezuelan Professional Baseball League. In 2008, Gil was inducted into the Venezuelan Baseball Hall of Fame.

== Playing career ==
Gil was a talented defensive specialist with a career fielding percentage that was eight points higher than the league average over the span of his playing career. Unfortunately, like many infielders of his time, Gil was a light hitter, and his major league career coincided with what has been called the second deadball era, when batting averages and run production in both leagues were at an unusually low level. He was signed as an amateur free agent by the Cincinnati Reds in 1959. He spent the next seven seasons playing in the minor leagues before being purchased by the Indians in 1966. He joined the Indians' major league club in 1967, at the age of 27.

Career highlights include a game-tying, two-run pinch hit double in the top of the ninth inning against the New York Yankees, then scored to put the Pilots ahead to stay, winning 5–4 (June 14, 1969); a walk-off, two-run double with two outs in the bottom of the ninth for the Brewers as they came from behind and defeated the Minnesota Twins, 4–3 (June 23, 1970); drove in both Milwaukee runs with a pair of sacrifice flies in a 2–1 win over the Kansas City Royals (July 5, 1970); hit the only home run of his major league career, a solo shot against Chicago White Sox left-hander Jim Magnuson (August 5, 1970).

In between major league seasons, Gil also played winter baseball with the Industriales de Valencia, Navegantes del Magallanes and Cardenales de Lara clubs of the Venezuelan Professional Baseball League in a career spanning 19 seasons from 1959 to 1977.

In the 1970 Caribbean Series, he hit .387, scored four runs, and had a series-leading seven RBI, to help the Magallanes win the series, marking the first time a Venezuelan team had won the tournament since its inception in 1949. In the 1973 Caribbean Series, Gil earned a spot on the series' All-Star team.

== Career statistics ==
In a four-year major league career, Gil played in 221 games, accumulating 87 hits in 468 at bats for a .186 career batting average along with one home run, 37 runs batted in and an on-base percentage of .272. His performance as a fielder was much better, with 186 putouts, 192 assists and 36 double plays, but only five errors out of 383 total chances for a .982 fielding percentage.

== Managing career ==
After his playing career, he served as manager for the Aguilas del Zulia in the Venezuelan Winter League in 1979. He also managed the Danville Suns in 1982, and the Bluefield Orioles in 1990 and 1991.

== Honors ==
In 2008, Gil was inducted into the Venezuelan Baseball Hall of Fame.

Gil died in 2015 in Phoenix, Arizona, at the age of 76.

== See also ==
- List of players from Venezuela in Major League Baseball
