= Dick Baney =

American baseball player (born 1946)

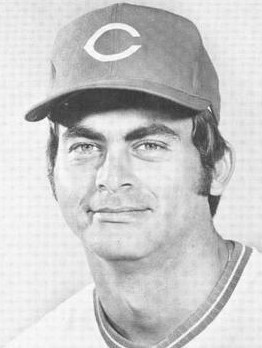
- Baney in 1974
- Pitcher
- Born: November 1, 1946 (age 79); Fullerton, California, U.S.
- Batted: Right Threw: Right

MLB debut
- July 11, 1969, for the Seattle Pilots

Last MLB appearance
- October 2, 1974, for the Cincinnati Reds

MLB statistics
- Win–loss record: 4–1
- Earned run average: 4.28
- Strikeouts: 38
- Saves: 3
- Stats at Baseball Reference

Teams
- Seattle Pilots (1969); Cincinnati Reds (1973–1974)

Richard Lee Baney (born November 1, 1946) is an American former Major League Baseball right-handed pitcher. He was drafted by the Boston Red Sox with the ninth pick of the secondary phase of the 1966 Major League Baseball draft, and later drafted by the Seattle Pilots from the Red Sox as the 33rd pick in the 1968 expansion draft. He played for the Pilots (1969) and the Cincinnati Reds (1973–1974).

He was dealt along with Buzz Stephen from the Milwaukee Brewers to the Baltimore Orioles for Dave May before the trade deadline on June 15, 1970.

During a three-year baseball career, Baney compiled a 4–1 record, three saves, 38 strikeouts, and a 4.28 earned run average in 42 games (three starts).

He posed nude for Playgirl in 1977.

After his retirement as a pitcher, Baney went into business with his father as a general contractor. As of 2006, he was living in Tustin, California and working as a real estate investor and property manager.
