= Winnipeg Goldeyes (1954–1969) =

- 1954–1969; (1954–1964, 1969); Winnipeg, Manitoba

Minor league affiliations
- Class: Class A-Short Season (1969); Class A (1963–1964); Class C (1954–1962)
- League: Northern League (1954–1964, 1969)

Major league affiliations
- Team: Kansas City Royals (1969); St. Louis Cardinals (1954–1964)

Minor league titles
- League titles (3): 1957; 1959; 1960

Team data
- Name: Winnipeg Goldeyes (1954–1964, 1969)
- Ballpark: Winnipeg Stadium (1954–1964, 1969)

The Winnipeg Goldeyes were a minor league baseball team that played in the Northern League from 1954 to 1964 and in 1969. They were based in Winnipeg, Manitoba and played their home games at Winnipeg Stadium. The Goldeyes won Northern League championships in 1957, 1959, and 1960.

== History ==
Winnipeg's previous entry in the Northern League was the Winnipeg Maroons, who played their last season in 1942 before the league shut down for World War II. After the 1953 season, Winnipeg bought the franchise of the league's Sioux Falls Canaries and returned to the circuit. The team was named after the goldeye fish via a name-the-team contest.

The Goldeyes played in the Northern League until 1964, winning league championships in 1957, 1959, and 1960. After the 1964 season, the general manager moved on to more profitable endeavors, and as nobody else was willing to run the club or to buy it for any price, the Goldeyes became inactive.

The Goldeyes franchise was inactive from after the 1964 season until 1969, when the team returned to the Northern League as an affiliate of the Kansas City Royals. In June 1970, the Goldeyes were bought by the Montreal Expos and moved to Watertown, South Dakota to become the Watertown Expos, while the relocated Buffalo Bisons took their spot in Winnipeg as the Winnipeg Whips.

== Year-by-year record ==
Year	Parent club	League	W–L	Win %	Place	Manager	Postseason	Attendance	Ref
Winnipeg Goldeyes
1954	STL	NOR	73–60	.549	3rd	Mickey O'Neil	Lost 1st round 1–2 vs. Fargo–Moorhead	100,458	
1955	STL	NOR	70–56	.556	t-3rd	Al Kubski	Lost 1st round 0–2 vs. St. Cloud	84,668	
1956	STL	NOR	63–55	.534	2nd	Vern Benson	Lost 1st round 0–1 vs. Aberdeen	64,459	
1957	STL	NOR	69–53	.566	2nd	Vern Benson	Won finals 2–1 vs. Duluth–Superior	86,214	
1958	STL	NOR	65–53	.551	3rd	Al Unser	Lost 1st round 0–1 vs. St. Cloud	90,998	
1959	STL	NOR	80–41	.661	1st	Chase Riddle	Won 1st round 1–0 vs. Fargo–Moorhead; Won finals 2–1 vs Aberdeen	79,847	
1960	STL	NOR	72–51	.585	1st	Whitey Kurowski	Won 1st round 1–0 vs. Aberdeen; Won finals 2–0 vs Duluth–Superior	83,014	
1961	STL	NOR	46–77	.374	6th	Grover Resigner; Owen Friend	–	45,874	
1962	STL	NOR	59–63	.484	7th	Fred Koenig	–	83,645	
1963	STL	NOR	55–64	.462	4th	Fred Koenig	–	61,377	
1964	STL	NOR	52–65	.444	4th	Ron Plaza	–	85,425	
Franchise inactive 1965 –1968
1969	KC	NOR	26–43	.377	6th	Spider Jorgensen	–	18,077	
Totals			730–681	.515				884,056	
