= John Gelnar =

American baseball player (born 1943)

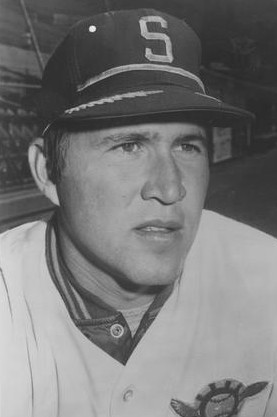
- Gelnar in 1969
- Pitcher
- Born: June 25, 1943 (age 83); Granite, Oklahoma, U.S.
- Batted: Right Threw: Right

MLB debut
- August 4, 1964, for the Pittsburgh Pirates

Last MLB appearance
- April 30, 1971, for the Milwaukee Brewers

MLB statistics
- Win–loss record: 7–14
- Earned run average: 4.18
- Strikeouts: 126
- Stats at Baseball Reference

Teams
- Pittsburgh Pirates (1964, 1967); Seattle Pilots / Milwaukee Brewers (1969–1971)

John Richard Gelnar (born June 25, 1943) is an American former Major League Baseball pitcher.

Gelnar attended Granite High School in Granite, Oklahoma, and the University of Oklahoma, where he played college baseball for the Oklahoma Sooners. He signed with the Pittsburgh Pirates as an amateur free agent in 1963, after his freshman year at Oklahoma. His contract was purchased by the Kansas City Royals from the Pirates after the 1968 season, but he was traded by the Royals with Steve Whitaker to the Seattle Pilots for Lou Piniella prior to the 1969 season. He was traded by the Brewers with José Herrera to the Detroit Tigers for Jim Hannan on May 11, 1971.

After his baseball career ended, Gelnar worked in the oil industry before becoming a farmer and rancher in Hobart in his native Oklahoma. As of April 2018, he still lived in Hobart with his wife, Michele, and dog, Beckett, named for Major League pitcher Josh Beckett. Gelnar's son, Jonathan, is a baseball coach.
