= Gene Brabender =

American baseball player (1941–1996)

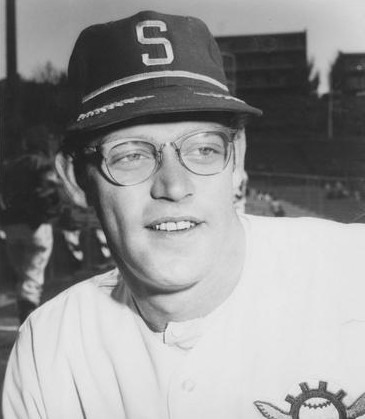
- Brabender with the Seattle Pilots in 1969
- Pitcher
- Born: August 16, 1941; Madison, Wisconsin, U.S.
- Died: December 27, 1996 (aged 55); Madison, Wisconsin, U.S.
- Batted: Right Threw: Right

MLB debut
- May 11, 1966, for the Baltimore Orioles

Last MLB appearance
- September 26, 1970, for the Milwaukee Brewers

MLB statistics
- Win–loss record: 35–43
- Earned run average: 4.25
- Strikeouts: 440
- Stats at Baseball Reference

Teams
- Baltimore Orioles (1966–1968); Seattle Pilots / Milwaukee Brewers (1969–1970)

Eugene Mathew Brabender (August 16, 1941 – December 27, 1996), nicknamed "Lurch", was an American Major League Baseball pitcher. He was signed by the Los Angeles Dodgers as an amateur free agent before the 1961 season. He also was a member of the US Army from 1963 to 1964. He pitched for the Baltimore Orioles (1966–1968), Seattle Pilots / Milwaukee Brewers (1969–1970). During a 5-year baseball career, Brabender compiled 35 wins, 440 strikeouts, and a 4.25 earned run average. He stood 6 feet 6 inches (1.98 m) tall and weighed 225 pounds (102 kg).

Brabender, described by pitcher Steve Barber as "a hard-throwing right-handed country boy," made his Major League debut in relief on May 11, 1966. He entered a tie game against the Chicago White Sox in the top of the 10th inning at Memorial Stadium and gave up a run in the 11th, resulting in a 3–2 Orioles loss. He was part of the Orioles' 1966 World Series champion team, but did not appear in a World Series game. Brabender was 16–14 with a 3.39 ERA in 82 games (30 starts) during his time in Baltimore. He pitched the best game of his career on August 7, 1967, against the Cleveland Indians, tossing a four-hit shutout while striking out 12 batters.

According to author and former teammate Jim Bouton, when Brabender was set to join the Seattle Pilots, his would-be teammates were trying to conjure another nickname for this huge newcomer. When one Pilot pitcher shared that Brabender was tough enough to take the metal spikes that hold the bases in the ground and bend them in his bare hands, they agreed, "We better call him 'Sir.'" Brabender, who would return after baseball to work on his family's Wisconsin dairy farm, was also revealed in Bouton's later version of Ball Four to have been the clubhouse jokester who once nailed Bouton's shoes to the floor. Not only that but Brabender also "would scare guys half to death by shooting a dart into the wall abiove their heads with a homemade blowgun." Brabender's imposing physicality also later prompted Bouton in the mid-'70s to audition Brabender (aka "Bender") for the role of an intimidating teammate on the sitcom version of Ball Four (TV series), but ultimately another former pro athlete, Ben Davidson got the part.

He along with Gordon Lund was traded from the Orioles to the Seattle Pilots for Chico Salmon on March 31, 1969. Brabender led Seattle with 13 wins in their only season in the Pacific Northwest. The Pilots moved to Milwaukee during 1970 spring training and became the Brewers, and in what would be his final season, Brabender compiled a 6–15 record with one save and a 6.02 ERA in 29 games (21 starts).

Brabender died of a brain aneurysm at age 55 on December 27, 1996.
