= Rod Belcher =

Sports broadcaster from California (1920–2014)

- Born: November 4, 1920; Berkeley, California, U.S.
- Died: December 12, 2014 (aged 94); Seattle, Washington, U.S.
- Education: Humboldt State College
- Years active: 1946-1969
- Sports commentary career
- Teams: Seattle Rainiers; Washington Huskies; Seattle Redhawks
- Genre: Play-by-play
- Employer: KOL Radio; KING-TV

Roderick Belcher (November 4, 1920 – December 12, 2014) was an American sports broadcaster. He served as radio play-by-play announcer for the Seattle Rainiers from 1957 to 1958, having succeeded Leo Lassen in that role. Belcher also wrote the Seattle Pilots theme song, "Go Go You Pilots." He also served as the voice of the San Francisco 49ers.

== Biography ==
Belcher was born November 4, 1920, in Berkeley, California He attended Humboldt State College, where he was a star basketball player. He was a member of the school's 1941 Far Western Conference championship team. Belcher began his sports broadcasting career in 1946 with KMO radio in Tacoma, Washington.

In 1950, Belcher was hired by a San Francisco station which had a beer company as the sponsor; he changed his radio name to Rod Hughes to avoid embarrassment to the sponsor. He returned to the State of Washington in 1954 where he was a sports broadcaster on KOL radio in Seattle. In 1957, he began doing play-by-play of Seattle Rainiers games on KOL. He also broadcast University of Washington football and Seattle University basketball games. From 1960 to 1969, he was employed by KING-TV and radio in Seattle. He was named the State of Washington's top sports broadcaster from 1961 to 1964. He was also selected by the Associated Press as its football board member for the State of Washington.

Belcher later worked for more than 10 years as a public information officer for the State of Washington Highway Department. He once served as sports editor of the Humboldt Times and contributed to The Seattle Times. Belcher died on December 12, 2014.
