= Steve Whitaker (baseball) =

American baseball player

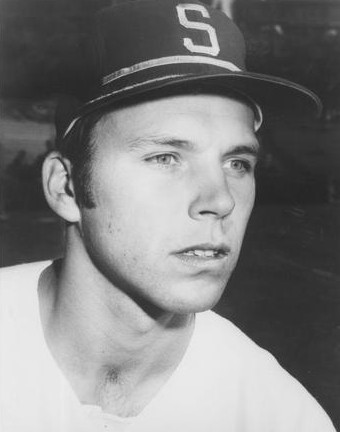
- Whitaker in 1969
- Outfielder
- Born: May 7, 1943 (age 81); Tacoma, Washington, U.S.
- Batted: Left Threw: Right

MLB debut
- August 23, 1966, for the New York Yankees

Last MLB appearance
- May 9, 1970, for the San Francisco Giants

MLB statistics
- Batting average: .230
- Home runs: 24
- Runs batted in: 85
- Stats at Baseball Reference

Teams
- New York Yankees (1966–1968); Seattle Pilots (1969); San Francisco Giants (1970)

Stephen Edward Whitaker (born May 7, 1943) is an American former Major League Baseball outfielder. He played from 1966 to 1970 for the New York Yankees, Seattle Pilots and San Francisco Giants. Whitaker was signed by the Yankees as an amateur free agent in 1962, and made his major league debut with the Yankees on August 23, 1966, going 1-for-4 in a 1–0 loss against the California Angels. In 1967, he played his first full season in the majors, batting .243 with 11 home runs and 50 RBI in 122 games with the Yankees.

After the 1968 season, he was selected by the Kansas City Royals in the 1968 Major League Baseball expansion draft. Whitaker was traded by the Royals, along with John Gelnar to the Pilots for Lou Piniella at the end of spring training 1969. He split the 1969 season between the majors and minors, batting .250 with six home runs and 13 RBI in 69 games with the Pilots.

On December 12, 1969, Whitaker was traded to the San Francisco Giants alongside Dick Simpson in exchange for Bob Bolin. In his final major league action, he hit .111 (3-for-27) while driving in four runs.

Following his playing career, Whitaker became a real estate broker along with his son, Chad. Chad was drafted in the third round of the 1995 MLB draft by the Cleveland Indians, and played in their minor league system until 2001.
