= Bill McNulty =

American baseball player (born 1946)

- Utility player
- Born: August 29, 1946 (age 79); Sacramento, California, U.S.
- Batted: Right Threw: Right

Professional debut
- MLB: July 9, 1969, for the Oakland Athletics
- NPB: June 3, 1975, for the Lotte Orions

Last appearance
- MLB: October 4, 1972, for the Oakland Athletics
- NPB: September 28, 1975, for the Lotte Orions

MLB statistics
- Batting average: .037
- Home runs: 0
- Runs batted in: 0

NPB statistics
- Batting average: .190
- Home runs: 13
- Runs batted in: 27
- Stats at Baseball Reference

Teams
- Oakland Athletics (1969, 1972); Lotte Orions (1975)

William Francis McNulty (born August 29, 1946) is an American former professional baseball player. He played for the Oakland Athletics of Major League Baseball for parts of two seasons, in 1969 and 1972. He also played one season for the Lotte Orions of Nippon Professional Baseball in 1975. During his major league career, he played in the outfield and at third base.

== Early life ==
McNulty was born on August 29, 1946, in Roseville, California. His father, Ray, played professional baseball in the Pacific Coast League (PCL) and his uncle, Gene, played in the farm system of the New York Yankees.

McNulty attended Highlands High School in North Highlands, California. The Sacramento Union named him to the All-City team as a third baseman in 1964, his senior year, in which he had a .355 batting average with six home runs. McNulty also played for the basketball team and American football team as a quarterback. He attended American River College in Sacramento and played college baseball and college basketball for one year.

== Professional career ==
McNulty signed with the Kansas City Athletics in February 1965. Don Pries, the scout who signed him, had informed him that the Athletics would be moving to Oakland, California, in two years. That year, McNulty enlisted in the United States Marine Corps Reserve, attending boot camp for six months. He also needed to miss one month of each baseball season for the next six years to fulfill his commitment.

McNulty played for the Burlington Bees of the Single-A Midwest League in 1966 before receiving a late season promotion to the Mobile A's of the Double-A Southern League in September. McNulty split the 1967 and 1968 seasons between the Peninsula Grays of the Single-A Carolina League and the Birmingham A's of the Southern League. struggling with Birmingham in both seasons. He began the 1969 season with Birmingham and he hit .292 with 18 home runs and 59 runs batted in (RBIs).

On July 9, 1969, Tommie Reynolds went on the disabled list with a broken finger and the Athletics promoted McNulty to the major leagues. They told him that he would play as a left fielder, though he had no experience playing the position. He batted 0-for-17 with 10 strikeouts in five games. The Athletics demoted him to the Iowa Oaks of the Triple-A American Association on July 14.

McNulty batted .295 with 22 home runs for Iowa in 1970. After the season, the Milwaukee Brewers acquired McNulty in a trade for Gary Timberlake. McNulty thought that he had hit well enough to make the Brewers' roster for the 1971 season, but manager Dave Bristol thought he was a poor and lackadaisical fielder. Milwaukee's general manager, Frank Lane, approached McNulty about becoming a pitcher, which he refused. The Athletics purchased McNulty's contract back from Milwaukee before the start of the season and returned him to Iowa. He hit 27 home runs for Iowa in 1971, which led the American Association. After the 1971 season, the Athletics traded McNulty and Frank Fernández to the Chicago Cubs for Adrian Garrett. He played for the Tacoma Rainiers in the PCL playoffs and hit four home runs.

Having too many outfielders and wanting to prioritize the development of Terry Hughes as a third baseman, the Cubs loaned McNulty to the Brewers for the 1972 season. He played for the Evansville Triplets of the American Association, where he batted .258 with 24 home runs and 73 RBIs. In late September, the Athletics reacquired McNulty, intending to promote him to the major leagues. They could not find him as he had gone hunting in the Warner Mountains. McNulty's father drove to Alturas where he found two forest rangers who located Bill at his campsite to tell him that there was a family emergency. At the nearest sheriff's station, he called his father, who told him to report to Oakland. McNulty batted 1-for-10 for the Athletics in three games as a third baseman. His only hit came off of Nolan Ryan.

After the 1972 season, the Athletics traded McNulty and a player to be named later to the Texas Rangers for Paul Lindblad. The Athletics sent Brant Alyea to the Rangers to complete the trade. McNulty attended spring training with Texas in 1973. He did not make the team and the Rangers traded him to the New York Mets for Bill Sudakis. He hit 25 home runs for the Tidewater Tides of the Triple-A International League in 1973.

Before the 1974 season, the Brewers purchased McNulty's contract from the Mets and assigned him to the Sacramento Solons of the PCL. In 1974, McNulty hit 55 home runs, leading all of professional baseball. He also batted .330 and set PCL records with 134 runs scored and 135 RBIs. However, Sacramento's home stadium, Hughes Stadium, was a converted football field that went only 232 feet (71 m) to left field, an unusually short distance. He returned to Sacramento for the 1975 season. However, the Brewers attempted to cut his salary, and he signed with the Lotte Orions of Nippon Professional Baseball for $70,000 ($418,831 in current dollar terms) one month into the 1975 season. He batted .190 for Lotte and was released after spending six weeks with the team.

== Personal life ==
While he was still playing for Sacramento, McNulty became a partner in a clothing store in Roseville, California.

McNulty met Sue Isekite when he played for Tacoma. They married in 1979 and lived in Eatonville, Washington. They have two daughters.
