= Bill Edgerton =

American baseball player (born 1941)

- Pitcher
- Born: August 16, 1941 (age 84); South Bend, Indiana, U.S.
- Batted: Left Threw: Left

MLB debut
- September 3, 1966, for the Kansas City Athletics

Last MLB appearance
- April 25, 1969, for the Seattle Pilots

MLB statistics
- Win–loss record: 1–2
- Earned run average: 4.79
- Strikeouts: 11
- Stats at Baseball Reference

Teams
- Kansas City Athletics (1966–1967); Seattle Pilots (1969)

William Albert Edgerton (born August 16, 1941) is an American former Major League Baseball left-handed pitcher. He pitched for the Kansas City Athletics (1966–1967) and Seattle Pilots (1969). Edgerton was born in South Bend, Indiana. He is 6 ft 2 in (1.88 m) and weighs 185 pounds (84 kg).

During a three-year baseball career, Edgerton compiled one win, 11 strikeouts, and a 4.79 earned run average in 17 games (one start).

Following his career in the majors, Edgerton pitched in the Orioles, Brewers, and Dodgers minor league systems. He played his final season in 1971.
