= Buzz Stephen =

American baseball player (1944–2024)

- Pitcher
- Born: July 13, 1944; Porterville, California, U.S.
- Died: May 9, 2024 (aged 79); Porterville, California, U.S.
- Batted: Right Threw: Right

MLB debut
- September 20, 1968, for the Minnesota Twins

Last MLB appearance
- September 25, 1968, for the Minnesota Twins

MLB statistics
- Win–loss record: 1–1
- Earned run average: 4.76
- Strikeouts: 4
- Stats at Baseball Reference

Teams
- Minnesota Twins (1968)

Louis Roberts "Buzz" Stephen (July 13, 1944 – May 9, 2024) was an American Major League Baseball pitcher. He was born in Porterville, California, which is where he resided. He ended up choosing to attend Fresno State University.

Stephen, who was 6 ft 4 in (1.93 m) tall and who weighed about 205 pounds, was originally drafted by the Houston Astros in the 25th round of the amateur entry draft in 1965. Opting not to sign, he waited until 1966 to be drafted again. This time, he was first drafted by the Minnesota Twins in the 1st round of the June Secondary Phase of the draft. He did not sign that time, but again in 1966 he was drafted by the Twins in the second round of the January Secondary Phase of the draft. He chose to sign after being drafted in that instance.

In his one year in the majors, Stephen's salary was $5,400 and he wore number 42. He also committed one error.

On October 15, 1968 the Seattle Pilots selected Stephen in the expansion draft. Stephen was dealt along with Dick Baney from the Milwaukee Brewers to the Baltimore Orioles for Dave May before the trade deadline on June 15, 1970.

Stephen, who both threw and hit right-handed, only pitched in two major league games, making his debut on September 20, 1968. His last game was on September 25, 1968. In 3 career at-bats, his batting average was .000.

Stephen died on May 9, 2024, at the age of 79.
