= Miguel Fuentes (baseball) =

Puerto Rican baseball player (1946–1970)

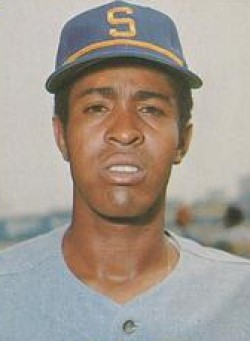
- Pitcher
- Born: May 10, 1946; Loíza, Puerto Rico
- Died: January 29, 1970 (aged 23); Loíza, Puerto Rico
- Batted: Right Threw: Right

MLB debut
- September 1, 1969, for the Seattle Pilots

Last MLB appearance
- October 2, 1969, for the Seattle Pilots

MLB statistics
- Win–loss record: 1–3
- Earned run average: 5.19
- Strikeouts: 14
- Stats at Baseball Reference

Teams
- Seattle Pilots (1969)

Career highlights and awards
- Last player to throw a pitch for the Seattle Pilots (October 2, 1969)

Miguel Fuentes Pinet (May 10, 1946 – January 29, 1970) was a Puerto Rican Major League Baseball (MLB) pitcher. Fuentes was signed to his first professional contract in 1969 with the Seattle Pilots. He went on to pitch in eight games for the club at the major league level after strong performances in the minor leagues. During the off-season, he was murdered in a bar fight at the age of 23.

== Early life and early career ==
Fuentes was born in Loíza, Puerto Rico, in the barrio of Loíza Aldea. He starred as an amateur baseball player and, in 1968, helped lead his amateur team to a Puerto Rican championship. He was discovered by scout Felix Delgado, who went on to sign Fuentes to his first professional contract.

== Career with the Pilots organization ==
Fuentes was initially assigned to the Clinton Pilots, a Class A team in the Midwest League. He recorded an 8–2 record in 26 appearances and his earned run average (ERA) of 1.46 was the lowest in the league for pitchers with 40 or more innings pitched. For his efforts, Fuentes was called to the Seattle Pilots' Major League roster in September 1969.

He made his Major League debut on September 1, striking out two in an inning of work against the New York Yankees. After a second relief appearance, Fuentes was given his first Major League start; he responded by throwing a complete game against the Chicago White Sox, giving up one run on seven hits.

Fuentes made three other starts with the Pilots, with a relief appearance in between his second and third starts; in those other three starts he was credited with the loss. Fuentes ended his Major League year with a relief appearance in Seattle's final game, where he threw the team's last ever pitches, as the Pilots would become the Milwaukee Brewers in 1970.

During his lone year in baseball, Fuentes was 1–3 with a 5.19 ERA and 14 strikeouts in eight games (four starts).

== Death ==
During the MLB off-season in the winter of 1969 and 1970, Fuentes played in the Puerto Rican Winter League with the Caguas Criollos.

A few days after the Criollos' season ended in the league's playoffs, on January 29, Fuentes was shot three times at a bar in Loíza Aldea. "Fuentes had gone outside to relieve himself because there was a plumbing problem in the bathroom. Someone who thought Fuentes was doing it too close to his car shot him." Fuentes was sent to a hospital in a state of shock and died of his wounds shortly thereafter.

Fuentes was regarded as a top prospect in the Pilots organization at the time of his death. Because of the Pilots' move to Milwaukee in 1970 to become the Brewers, Fuentes holds the distinction of throwing the final pitches in the history of the Seattle Pilots.

Fuentes appears in the 1970 set of Topps baseball cards as a Seattle Pilot, as the Topps cards were already in production (and the Seattle franchise had not yet announced their move to Milwaukee) at the time of Fuentes' death.

== See also ==
- List of baseball players who died during their careers
