= Dewey Soriano =

American baseball executive (1920–1998)

Dewey Soriano in 1947 as a member of the Oakland Oaks

Dewey Soriano (February 8, 1920 – April 6, 1998) was the part-owner of the Seattle Pilots baseball team of the American League in 1969, the franchise's only year in Seattle.

== Early life and minor league career ==
Dewey Soriano was born in Prince Rupert, British Columbia, the sixth of ten children of Angel Lorenzo Soriano, a fisherman originally from Spain, and Anna Bundgaard, a farmer's daughter from Denmark. Soriano moved to Seattle with his family when he was five. He played baseball at Franklin High School in Seattle; among his teammates on the Quakers were Fred Hutchinson and newspaper columnist Emmett Watson.

As a 19-year-old, Soriano made his minor league pitching debut with the Seattle Rainiers in 1939. He appeared in nine games that year, but only two in 1940 as a knee injury basically ended his year on the baseball diamond. He became a regular player for the Rainiers in 1941 and 1942. His career was interrupted by WWII; Soriano spent 4 years in the merchant marine, returning to play for Seattle in 1946.

Traded in 1947, Soriano spend the next several years with a wide range of minor league teams. In 1949, using money borrowed from his brothers, he became the part-owner and player-manager of the Yakima Bears for both the 1949 and 1950 seasons. His playing career ended in 1951. As a player, Soriano made it as high as Triple-A, but never made it to the majors.

== Transition to baseball executive ==
After his playing career ended, Soriano initially left baseball altogether, and worked as a nautical ship's pilot for two years. He was then lured back to baseball in 1953 and became the general manager of the Rainiers. He continued to work in the ownership/management side of baseball for the next decade-plus, eventually serving as president of both the Pacific Coast League and the Western International League for several years.

Soriano (as the head of a group of investors that included his brother Max Soriano) won the Pilots expansion franchise in late 1967. However, he didn't have enough money to pay the franchise fee. In what proved to be a harbinger of things to come, he had to ask for help from former Cleveland Indians owner Bill Daley — who, ironically, had nearly moved the Indians to Seattle earlier in the 1960s. In return, Soriano sold Daley a 47 percent stake in the team, making him the largest shareholder. Soriano, however, retained the team presidency. Largely due to being badly undercapitalized, Soriano was nearly out of money by the end of the 1969 season.

Almost as soon as the season ended, it was apparent that Soriano wouldn't be able to hold out before moving to a new stadium. It was also apparent that the timetable for a new park would have to be significantly advanced, as the Pilots' temporary home, Sick's Stadium, was completely inadequate even for temporary use. Soriano put the Pilots on the market, but no credible offers surfaced from Seattle interests. Out of desperation, Soriano cut a deal to sell the franchise to a Milwaukee-based group led by Bud Selig. However, legal action dragged out throughout the 1969–1970 offseason. Ultimately, Soriano took the team into bankruptcy, clearing the way for Selig to take control and move the Pilots to Milwaukee as the Milwaukee Brewers.

== Aftermath ==
“He was a poor kid from the Rainier Valley whose dream was baseball. That was his big goal — baseball, baseball, baseball. Bringing a team to Seattle was pretty amazing. I wouldn't use the word bitter to describe how he felt. I would use disappointment. I'm not sure he ever got over it.”
- Cathi Soriano, Dewey's daughter.

After the move to Milwaukee was finalized in late March, Soriano and his brother Max were hung in effigy in Seattle. Both Soriano brothers left baseball behind to return to working in marine-related enterprises, Dewey as a ship's pilot, Max as an admiralty lawyer.

After seven summers without major league baseball in Seattle, the expansion Mariners began play in 1977. Although they had been personae non gratae in Seattle in the immediate aftermath of the Pilots collapse, both Dewey and Max attended Mariners games regularly and were generally treated well by fans who recognized them.

Soriano married Alice Brougham, daughter of Royal Brougham (1894–1978), longtime sports editor of the Seattle Post-Intelligencer newspaper.

Diagnosed with Alzheimer's disease in the mid-1990s, Dewey Soriano died in 1998.

Preceded by Leslie O'Connor	Pacific Coast League president 1960–1968	Succeeded by Bill McKechnie Jr.
