= Chico Salmon =

Panamanian baseball player (1940–2000)

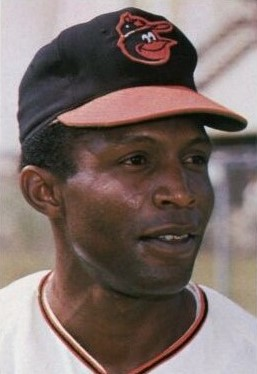
- Utility player
- Born: December 3, 1940; Colón, Panama
- Died: September 17, 2000 (aged 59); Bocas del Toro, Panama
- Batted: Right Threw: Right

MLB debut
- June 28, 1964, for the Cleveland Indians

Last MLB appearance
- August 14, 1972, for the Baltimore Orioles

MLB statistics
- Batting average: .249
- Home runs: 31
- Runs batted in: 149
- Stats at Baseball Reference

Teams
- Cleveland Indians (1964–1968); Baltimore Orioles (1969–1972)

Career highlights and awards
- World Series champion (1970)
Medals
Men's baseball
Representing Panama
Central American and Caribbean Games
Bronze medal – third place	1959 Caracas	Team

Ruthford Eduardo "Chico" Salmon (December 3, 1940 – September 17, 2000) was a Panamanian professional baseball player. He played in Major League Baseball as a utility player from 1964 through 1972, most notably as a member of the Baltimore Orioles team that won three consecutive American League pennants from 1969 to 1971 and, won the World Series in 1970. He also played for the Cleveland Indians.

== Early life ==
Salmon was born in Colón, Panama on December 3, 1940. Salmon graduated from Abel Bravo High School in Colón, where he lettered in baseball, basketball, and track. He later attended Abel Bravo College, where he also played baseball. It was as a college student that Salmon played for the Panamanian baseball team during the 1959 Pan-American Games in Venezuela.

== Minor league baseball career ==
Salmon was originally signed as a free agent by the original Washington Senators, and played one game for their minor league affiliate, the Missoula Timberjacks in 1959. He played in the minor leagues for teams affiliated with the San Francisco Giants (1960), Detroit Tigers (1961-62), and Milwaukee Braves (1963). During that time, his lowest batting average was .292, and he hit .325 or above every other year. In 1963, playing for the Denver Bears of the Triple-A Pacific Coast League at third base and in the outfield, he hit .325, with 103 runs scored and 19 stolen bases.

The Bears were a Triple-A affiliate of the Braves. Before the 1964 season, Salmon was traded by the Braves to the Cleveland Indians. During the 1964 season, Salmon played in 71 games for Cleveland's Pacific Coast League affiliate, the Portland Beavers. He hit only .234 in his worst minor league season.

== Major league baseball career ==
Salmon began play for the Cleveland Indians (now Guardians) chiefly as a versatile utility player from 1964 to 1968, both in the outfield and infield. Despite his unusually poor hitting at Portland in 1964, Cleveland called Salmon up in late June, when regular third baseman Max Alvis was stricken with spinal meningitis. Though Salmon did not play any games at third base, he started 39 games in the outfield and 31 at first or second base. In his rookie year his batting average was .307 in 283 at bats.

The most playing time he got with the Indians was 126 games in 1966 (hitting .256 in 422 at bats), playing 90 games or less in his other three seasons. He earned the nickname "Super Sub" in Cleveland.

Salmon was selected by the Seattle Pilots in the expansion draft following the 1968 season, but was acquired by the Orioles for Gene Brabender and Gordon Lund on March 31, 1969. He played for the Orioles from 1969 to 1972, retiring after that year. Never a starting level player, he did become the Orioles primary utility player, eventually playing all four infield positions. The most he played was in 1970 (63 games and 172 at bats), never playing in more than 52 games any other year or having more than 91 at bats. His highest Orioles average was .297 in 1969. In an August 16, 1969 game against the Pilots, Salmon had the best game of his career, going 4 for 4, with two home runs, and 6 runs batted in (RBIs).

The Orioles were American League champions from 1969 to 1971, winning the 1970 World Series over the Cincinnati Reds. In Game 2 of the 1970 World Series, Salmon had a critical pinch hit single and scored a run.

Salmon was not particularly well known for his fielding. While he was still with the team, the Orioles had a mock award named the Chico Salmon No Touch Award "to recognize fielding prowess that had all the deftness of a rhinoceros knitting," according to Jim Palmer. He was, however, widely known for his belief in ghosts which caused him to always sleep with the lights on. He had to confront this fear during his 1964 army service, where he could not sleep with lights on, but he never really overcame it later in life.

He retired with a career .249 average, 31 home runs, 202 runs scored and 149 RBIs.

== Personal life and death ==
After retiring, he moved to Cleveland and did social work with youth at the Lincoln Recreation Center, discouraging drug abuse. He later returned to Panama, did some baseball scouting there, and also managed the Panamanian team in the World Amateur Baseball Series.

He died from a heart attack on September 17, 2000, at the age of 59.
