= Tony Horton (baseball) =

American baseball player (born 1944)

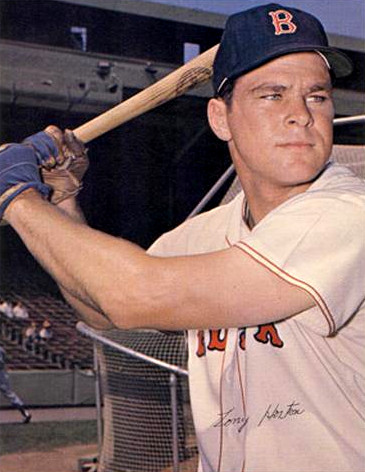
- First baseman
- Born: December 6, 1944 (age 81); Santa Monica, California, U.S.
- Batted: Right Threw: Right

MLB debut
- July 31, 1964, for the Boston Red Sox

Last MLB appearance
- August 28, 1970, for the Cleveland Indians

MLB statistics
- Batting average: .268
- Home runs: 76
- Runs batted in: 297
- Stats at Baseball Reference

Teams
- Boston Red Sox (1964–1967); Cleveland Indians (1967–1970)

Anthony Darrin Horton (born December 6, 1944) is an American former professional baseball player. A first baseman who batted and threw right-handed, Horton played in Major League Baseball (MLB) for the Boston Red Sox (1964–1967) and Cleveland Indians (1967–1970).

== Career ==
Horton made his major league debut at age 19 in 1964. He was a reserve first baseman for two seasons with the Red Sox until he was traded to the Indians in 1967 for Gary Bell, who won 12 games for the Red Sox during their pennant drive after going 1–5 in Cleveland. In 106 games played as an Indian, Horton batted .281 with 10 home runs and 44 runs batted in.

After batting .249 in 1968 with 14 homers and 59 RBI, Horton enjoyed his finest season in 1969, batting .278 and establishing career bests with 27 home runs and 93 runs batted in.

1970 was a difficult season for Horton. He batted .269 with 17 home runs and 59 RBI in a season full of ups and downs. On May 24 of that year in the second game of a doubleheader, he hit three home runs in an 8–7 loss to the New York Yankees but was upset about not hitting a fourth. One month later, again against the Yankees and in the first game of another doubleheader, he fouled off a “folly floater” from Steve Hamilton. He asked for another "Folly Floater," Hamilton threw it and Horton again popped it foul behind home plate, but this time into Thurman Munson's mitt for an out. An embarrassed Horton went back into the dugout.

On July 2, Horton hit for the cycle in a 10–9 victory over the Baltimore Orioles. His playing career ended unexpectedly on August 28, after he took himself out in the fifth inning of the second game of a doubleheader against the California Angels. After the game at his hotel, he attempted suicide by cutting his wrists, but was treated and recovered. The stress of professional baseball forced him to leave the game prematurely; he had played his last game three months shy of his 26th birthday. His manager, Alvin Dark, in his 1980 book When in Doubt, Fire the Manager, would call Horton's sudden exit “the most sorrowful incident I was ever involved in, in my baseball career.”

In his career, Horton batted .268 with 76 home runs and 297 RBI in 636 games played. His early exit from the game has often been tied to Indian lore with the Curse of Rocky Colavito.

== See also ==
- List of Major League Baseball players to hit for the cycle

Achievements
Preceded by Rod Carew	Hitting for the cycle July 2, 1970	Succeeded by Tommie Agee
