= Paul Lindblad =

American baseball player (1941–2006)

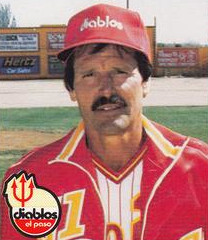
- Lindblad in 1988
- Pitcher
- Born: August 9, 1941; Chanute, Kansas, U.S.
- Died: January 1, 2006 (aged 64); Arlington, Texas, U.S.
- Batted: Left Threw: Left

MLB debut
- September 15, 1965, for the Kansas City Athletics

Last MLB appearance
- October 1, 1978, for the New York Yankees

MLB statistics
- Win–loss record: 68–63
- Earned run average: 3.29
- Strikeouts: 671
- Stats at Baseball Reference

Teams
- Kansas City / Oakland Athletics (1965–1971); Washington Senators / Texas Rangers (1971–1972); Oakland Athletics (1973–1976); Texas Rangers (1977–1978); New York Yankees (1978)

Career highlights and awards
- 3× World Series champion (1973, 1974, 1978); Pitched a combined no-hitter on September 28, 1975

Paul Aaron Lindblad (August 9, 1941 – January 1, 2006) was an American Major League Baseball left-handed middle-relief pitcher. During his career, he pitched primarily for the Kansas City / Oakland Athletics. At the time of his retirement in 1978, he had recorded the seventh-most appearances (655) of any left-hander in history.

== Career ==
Lindblad was born in Chanute, Kansas. A member of three World Series championship teams, he was a solid left-handed specialist in the American League for 14 seasons. A very fine fielder as well, he set a major league record by playing from 1966 to 1974 without making an error in 385 games.

Lindblad was signed by the Kansas City Athletics in 1962, who moved to Oakland in 1968. His most productive season came in 1969, when he posted career highs with nine wins and nine saves. A year later he followed with an 8–2 mark, and in the 1971 midseason he was traded to the Washington Senators, who became the Texas Rangers a year later. With Texas, he led American League pitchers with 66 appearances in 1972. After the 1972 season, the Rangers traded Lindblad to the Athletics for Bill McNulty and a player to be named later. The Athletics sent Brant Alyea to the Rangers to complete the trade.

Lindblad was the winning pitcher for Oakland in Game Three of the 1973 World Series against the New York Mets, by working shutout baseball in the ninth and tenth innings. In the 10th, he became the last pitcher faced by future Hall of Famer Willie Mays, who grounded out as a pinch-hitter.

In 1975, Lindblad had a 9–1 record with seven saves. On the final day of the regular season, he combined with Vida Blue, Glenn Abbott, and Rollie Fingers on a no-hitter against the California Angels. He appeared in two games against the Boston Red Sox in the American League Championship Series.

Lindblad came back to Texas for part of two seasons and made his final majors appearance with the New York Yankees in Game One of the 1978 World Series. He finished his career with a 68–63 record and 64 saves in 665 games. He posted a 3.29 earned run average and struck out 671 batters in 1,213 2/3 innings pitched.

Following his playing career, Lindblad joined the minor league baseball system as a pitching coach, and also worked as a custom home builder for several years.

== Personal life ==
Lindblad died in 2006 from Alzheimer's disease in Arlington, Texas at the age of 64.

Preceded by Ed Halicki	No-hit game September 28, 1975 (with Blue, Abbott & Fingers)	Succeeded by Larry Dierker
