= John O'Donoghue (1960s pitcher) =

American baseball player (born 1939)

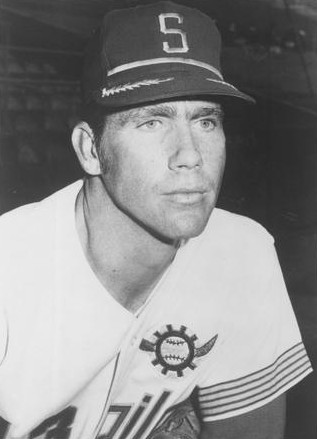
- O'Donoghue in 1969
- Pitcher
- Born: October 7, 1939 (age 86); Kansas City, Missouri, U.S.
- Batted: Right Threw: Left

MLB debut
- September 29, 1963, for the Kansas City Athletics

Last MLB appearance
- June 22, 1971, for the Montreal Expos

MLB statistics
- Win–loss record: 39–55
- Earned run average: 4.07
- Strikeouts: 377
- Stats at Baseball Reference

Teams
- Kansas City Athletics (1963–1965); Cleveland Indians (1966–1967); Baltimore Orioles (1968); Seattle Pilots / Milwaukee Brewers (1969–1970); Montreal Expos (1970–1971)

Career highlights and awards
- All-Star (1965)

John Eugene O'Donoghue (born October 7, 1939) is an American former Major League Baseball left-handed pitcher. He was signed by the Kansas City Athletics as an amateur free agent before the 1959 season and pitched for the Athletics (1963–1965), Cleveland Indians (1966–1967), Baltimore Orioles (1968), Seattle Pilots / Milwaukee Brewers (1969–1970), and Montreal Expos (1970–1971). During his nine-year major league career, O'Donoghue compiled 39 wins, 377 strikeouts, and a 4.07 earned run average. At the plate, he was 35-for-206 (.170) with three home runs, the first two against Buster Narum and the third off Denny McLain.

== Early life ==
O'Donoghue was born on October 7, 1939, in Kansas City, Missouri. He attended the University of Missouri, where he played on the baseball team. As a sophomore, he pitched on Missouri's College World Series runner-up team in 1958, losing two consecutive games to the champion University of Southern California (USC) team. His earlier victory got Missouri into the third round of the tournament.

The 18-year old O'Donoghue had pitched eight innings in the first loss to USC, and then came back the next night to pitch five innings, giving up only one run in a 12-inning loss to the Trojans. He was the first Missouri Tiger player ever to play in a Major League All-Star game.

== Playing career ==
O'Donoghue was signed by the Kansas City Athletics in 1959.

During his pitching career, O'Donoghue stood 6 feet 4 inches (1.93 m) tall and weighed 203 pounds (92 kg). He was primarily a starting pitcher during the first half of his major league career, and almost exclusively a reliever during the second half. From 1963 to 1967, he started in 93 of his 139 games, and from 1968 to 1971 relieved in 115 of his 118 games.

=== Minor leagues ===
O'Donoghue played in the Athletics minor league system from 1959 to 1963. He struggled greatly during his first four minor league seasons (1959–1962), from rookie ball to Double-A. He had a combined record of 26–39 with an earned run average of 5.54. In 499 innings pitched, he had given up 307 earned runs, struck out 360, and walked 358. In 1963, at the age of 24, it all began to come together. Pitching in the Eastern League and Pacific Coast League, he had a combined record of 14–11 with an ERA of 3.10 in 33 games (25 starts), leading to his call-up to the pitching-starved Athletics.

=== Major leagues ===
==== Kansas City ====
O'Donoghue made his major league debut on September 29, 1963, the last day of the regular season. He was the starting pitcher in a home game against the Cleveland Indians at Municipal Stadium. He gave up just two runs (one earned) in six innings, but was the losing pitcher as Jim "Mudcat" Grant and Cleveland prevailed, 2–1. O'Donoghue's first major league career win came on May 12, 1964, at Dodger Stadium. He started and pitched the first seven innings against the Los Angeles Angels, giving up two unearned runs, and the A's won by a score of 6–2. John Wyatt saved the game for him with two scoreless innings.

He played two full seasons with the A's (1964–65) after the one start in 1963. His record was 19–33 with a 4.38 ERA. O'Donoghue made the American League All-Star Team in 1965, though he did not play in the game.

==== Cleveland and Baltimore ====
In April 1966, the A's traded O'Donoghue and cash to Cleveland for pitcher Ralph Terry. He played the 1966 and 1967 seasons for Cleveland. O'Donoghue's finest major league effort was against the Detroit Tigers on August 19, 1967. He pitched a one-hit complete game shutout at Tiger Stadium that day, striking out 11 and walking only two batters. The Tigers had such players as Dick McAuliffe, Al Kaline, Willie Horton, Bill Freehan, Eddie Mathews, and Norm Cash in the lineup, but O'Donoghue was almost untouchable. Freehan got the only Tiger hit, a second-inning single, as the Indians won 5–0.

In two years with the Indians, he had a 14–17 record with a 3.51 ERA. On July 27, 1966, at Memorial Stadium, O'Donoghue gave up the first major league home run of catcher Larry Haney, in Haney's first major league game.

O'Donoghue was traded along with Gordon Lund by the Indians to the Baltimore Orioles for Eddie Fisher and minor leaguers Johnny Scruggs and Bob Scott on November 28, 1967. In 1968, he split the season between the Orioles and their Triple-A International League affiliate, the Rochester Red Wings. He started seven games in Triple-A ball that year, with a 2–4 record, 2.38 ERA and one shutout. He did not start any games for the Orioles, pitching 22 innings with a 6.14 ERA and two saves.

==== Seattle, Milwaukee, Montreal ====
In 1969, he began the year at Rochester, and on April 30 was traded to the expansion Seattle Pilots with Tom Fisher and Lloyd Fourroux for Gerry Schoen and Mike Ferraro. O’Donoghue played for the Pilots the only year they were in Seattle (before becoming the Milwaukee Brewers the following season). He is a main character in Jim Bouton’s baseball classic Ball Four, about a year with that Seattle team. In 1969, he relieved in 55 games for the Pilots and compiled a 2–2 record with six saves and a 2.96 ERA in 70 innings. He began the 1970 season with the Brewers, pitching 25 games in relief with a 5.01 ERA and 2–0 record.

During the 1969 season, in Ball Four Bouton quotes O'Donoghue saying on June 13, 1969, while "getting on the bus to go from the Biltmore Hotel to Yankee Stadium, 'Well, boys, here we start our tour of the funny farm.' He meant the streets of New York." Bouton also wrote of O'Donoghue, "We talk a lot about not drawing fans. At the same time most of the players are still telling the fans they'll be fined $50 if they sign any autographs. If some of the guys spent as much time signing autographs as they do shooing kids we'd have a lot more friends around here. Chief kid-shooer is O'Donoghue. He enjoys the work. One of these days he's going to make another Frank Crosetti." (Ball Four – August 22, 1969)

On June 15, he was traded to the Montreal Expos for Jose Herrera. It is also reported that O'Donoghue's contract was purchased by the Expos from the Brewers on June 15, 1970. He then split time between the Expos Triple-A affiliate, the Buffalo Bisons/Winnipeg Whips and the Expos for the remainder of the 1970 season. In Triple-A ball, he started 12 games, had a 6–5 record and a 2.83 ERA. He pitched in nine games for the Expos, starting three, with a 2–3 record and 5.24 ERA. He began the 1971 season with the Expos, his last year in professional baseball, pitching 17.1 innings in 13 games. The Expos released him on June 30.

=== Legacy ===
Even though O'Donoghue was named to the American League All-Star team in 1965, it probably does not qualify as his best season. He was 9–18 with a 3.95 ERA in 34 games (30 starts); the 18 losses tied him for the league lead with Boston Red Sox pitchers Bill Monbouquette and Dave Morehead. In 1967 for the Indians, he compiled an 8–9 record with two saves and a 3.24 ERA in 33 games (17 starts) and had his lowest career WHIP (1.171). And in 1969, he had a good year as a relief pitcher for Seattle, with his career lowest ERA and most saves.

In 1969, the Baltimore Orioles presented the John O'Donoghue Long Ball Award to pitchers who had given up home runs after games. Jim Palmer said it was named "in honor of the former Indian who had a tendency to throw fat pitches that ended up getting hit so hard they sometimes didn't land in the same county as the baseball park."

O'Donoghue held All-Stars Paul Blair, Tony Kubek, Roger Maris, Rick Monday, Boog Powell, Zoilo Versalles, and Roy White to a .140 collective batting average (19-for-136); and held Hall of Famers Luis Aparicio, Lou Brock, Frank Robinson, and Carl Yastrzemski to a .204 collective batting average (11-for-54). However, in the same game Haney hit his first home run, Aparicio led off the game for the Orioles with a home run against O’Donoghue, one of only 83 home runs he hit in an 18-year career.

== Coaching ==
In 1991, O'Donoghue returned to the Orioles as a coach in their minor league system, where he worked for a decade. He worked as a pitching coach for the Single-A Frederick Keys and the Double-A Bowie Baysox.

== Personal life ==
O'Donoghue is the father of former major league pitcher John Preston O'Donoghue, who O'Donoghue coached in the Orioles farm system, and who pitched for the Orioles in 1993. Preston attended Louisiana State University, where his daughter was on the track team. Preston's son Tyler played college football at Northwestern State University.

O'Donoghue worked 20 years with the Hammermill Paper Company in Wilmington, Delaware.

== Bibliography ==
- 1971 Baseball Register published by The Sporting News
