= Gary Bell (baseball) =

American baseball player (born 1936)

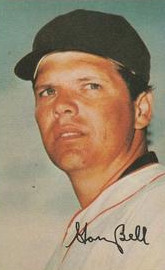
- Pitcher
- Born: November 17, 1936 (age 89); San Antonio, Texas, U.S.
- Batted: Right Threw: Right

MLB debut
- June 1, 1958, for the Cleveland Indians

Last MLB appearance
- September 1, 1969, for the Chicago White Sox

MLB statistics
- Win–loss record: 121–117
- Earned run average: 3.68
- Strikeouts: 1,378
- Stats at Baseball Reference

Teams
- Cleveland Indians (1958–1967); Boston Red Sox (1967–1968); Seattle Pilots (1969); Chicago White Sox (1969)

Career highlights and awards
- 4× All-Star (1960, 1960², 1966, 1968)

Wilbur Gary Bell (born November 17, 1936), nicknamed Ding Dong, is an American former Major League Baseball pitcher. He pitched from 1958 to 1969 for four teams in his career, but is noted primarily for his time with the Cleveland Indians. During a 12-year baseball career, Bell compiled 121 wins, 1,378 strikeouts, and a 3.68 earned run average in 519 games (233 starts).

== Early life ==
Bell was born on November 17, 1936, in San Antonio, Texas to Doris and Bill Bell. He graduated from Luther Burbank High School in 1954. He starred in football, basketball and golf, but the school did not have a baseball team. Bell played YMCA and American Legion baseball in San Antonio before becoming a professional baseball player. In 2004, he was inducted into the San Antonio Sports Hall of Fame, and in 2017, he was inducted into the San Antonio Independent School District Athletic Hall of Fame.

Bell attended high school with future major league pitcher Joe Horlen, graduating one year earlier. Both were inducted the same year into the school district's Hall of Fame. He attended San Antonio Junior College for one year, and was All-Conference in basketball.

== Professional baseball career ==
=== Minor leagues ===
Although Bell had the opportunity to sign with the New York Yankees or Boston Red Sox, among other teams, he chose to sign with the Cleveland Indians. Cleveland's pitching staff (including future Hall of Fame pitchers Bob Feller, Bob Lemon, and Early Wynn, along with Mike Garcia) was aging. This would provide Bell with an opportunity when he was ready to pitch in the major leagues. Bell played in Cleveland's minor league system from 1955 to 1958, when he was called up to Cleveland.

In 1956, Bell played for the Reading Fightin Phils of the Eastern League, with whom he had a 13-8 record, a 2.84 ERA, 13 complete games and a league leading 192 strikeouts. Bell was inducted into the Reading Baseball Hall of Fame in 2002.

At the beginning of the 1958 season, Bell was pitching for the San Diego Padres of the Pacific Coast League in Triple-A minor league baseball. He started the year with a 6-2 record and 1.56 ERA, and was leading the league in strikeouts. On May 29, 1958, Cleveland called Bell up to replace an injured Mike Garcia, who was released.

=== Major leagues ===
In his first two years in Cleveland, Bell compiled a 28–21 record as part of the Cleveland pitching rotation. In 1960, his record was 5–1 after the first month of play, but shoulder problems developed, causing him to win just four of his last 13 decisions. In late August, he was shut down for the remainder of the season. The following year, Bell got off to a slow start with an 0–4 record, and finished with a 12–16 record and a 4.10 ERA in 34 starts. Physical problems as well as issues with pitch control were tabbed as the main reasons for his continued struggles.

In 1962, Bell was converted into a reliever, helping the Indians by picking up over 10 saves in 1962 and 1966. In 1963, Bell went 8–5 with five saves and a 2.95 ERA in 58 appearances (seven starts). Despite this, the Indians finished the season under .500 (79–83). Bell was a fastball pitcher early in his career and then developed a slider and curveball.

After 10 seasons with Cleveland, Bell was traded to the Boston Red Sox on June 4, 1967, for Tony Horton and Don Demeter. In his final full season with the Indians, he had gone back to being a starter and went 14–15 with a 3.22 ERA in 40 games (37 starts). He became a part of the Red Sox 1967 World Series hopes, but they lost to the St. Louis Cardinals. Bell pitched in three games (one start), going 0–1 with a 5.06 ERA. After two fairly solid seasons with Boston, he became a draftee of the expansion Seattle Pilots in 1969. On the Pilots, he roomed with fellow veteran pitcher Jim Bouton who chronicled their camaraderie and of-the-field exploits in his notoriously frank bestseller Ball Four. After going 2–6 with a 4.70 ERA in 13 games (11 starts) for the Pilots, he was traded to the Chicago White Sox in exchange for Bob Locker on June 8, 1969. Bell was released by the White Sox at the end of the 1969 season.

Tommy John became friends with Bell while both pitchers were with the Indians. John described Bell as "a free-spirited, happy-go-lucky righthanded starter and one of the biggest drinkers on the team." He was a serious competitor with a great sense of humor.

== Personal life ==
Bell is a current resident of San Antonio, Texas. In 1987, Bell opened Gary Bell Athletic Supply in San Antonio, which is still in business (as of December 2024).
