= Seattle Pilots =

American baseball club (1969)

Logo	Cap insignia

Information
- League: American League (1969); West Division (1969)
- Ballpark: Sick's Stadium (1969)
- Established: 1969
- Relocated: 1970 (to Milwaukee; became the Milwaukee Brewers)
- Nickname: None
- World Series championships: None
- American League pennant: None
- AL West division titles: None
- Colors: Royal blue, gold, white
- Mascot: None
- Retired numbers: None
- Ownership: William R. Daley & Dewey Soriano
- General manager: Marvin Milkes
- Manager: Joe Schultz Jr.

The Seattle Pilots were an expansion Major League Baseball team based in Seattle. Based at Sick's Stadium, the team played for just one season, 1969, finishing last in the West Division of Major League Baseball's American League with a 64–98 record. After their inaugural season, team ownership struggled financially to keep the franchise and pay their players.

In the ensuing off season, the Pilots declared bankruptcy and Bud Selig purchased the team and its assets. On April 1, 1970, Selig relocated the franchise to Milwaukee and renamed it the Milwaukee Brewers. Afterwards, the city of Seattle and King County sued the American League for breach of contract. To end the lawsuit in 1976, the league agreed to grant an expansion team to Seattle, leading to the creation of the Seattle Mariners.

== Formation ==
Team photo

The franchise was owned by Pacific Northwest Sports, Inc. (PNSI), led by Dewey Soriano, a former Seattle Rainiers pitcher and general manager and former president of the Pacific Coast League. The team's nickname of "Pilots" came from Soriano's part-time job as a harbor pilot and the city's association with the aviation industry. The team colors were royal blue and gold (with accessory red in the logo: helm and baseball seams).

Seattle had long been a hotbed for minor league baseball and was home to the Seattle Rainiers, one of the pillars of the Pacific Coast League (PCL). At the time, Seattle was the third-biggest metropolitan area on the West Coast. The then-Cleveland Indians (now Guardians) briefly considered a move to Seattle in 1964 but opted to stay in the city. In 1967, Charles Finley looked to move his Kansas City Athletics to Seattle, but ended up moving the franchise to Oakland instead.

There was no significant competition from other professional teams at the time in the city. While Seattle had landed the National Basketball Association (NBA)'s SuperSonics (now the Oklahoma City Thunder) in 1967, the NBA was not as popular as baseball was at the time. The National Football League did not come to the city until 1976 with the addition of the expansion Seahawks. Much later, Major League Soccer expanded to the city in 2009 and the National Hockey League followed in 2021, with the introduction of the Sounders and Kraken, respectively.

In an ominous sign of things to come, Soriano found himself short of cash after making little effort to find locally-based partners. He had to ask William R. Daley, who owned the Indians during the time they flirted with moving to Seattle, to underwrite much of the purchase price. In return, Soriano sold Daley 47% of the stock. Daley became the team's largest shareholder and chairman of the board, while Soriano remained team president.

A couple of factors were beyond the Pilots' control. They were originally not set to start play until 1971 along with the Kansas City Royals. However, the date was moved up to 1969 under pressure from Senator Stuart Symington of Missouri. Professional baseball had been played in Kansas City in one form or another from 1883 until the A's left for Oakland after the 1967 season, and Symington would not accept the prospect of Kansas City having to wait three years for baseball to return there. The American League would not allow only one new team to enter the league, as the resulting odd number of teams would unbalance the schedule. That meant that Kansas City and Seattle had to be admitted together.

Despite Soriano having been president of the PCL, he had to pay the PCL $1 million to compensate for the loss of one of its longest-standing and most successful franchises. After King County voters approved a bond for a domed stadium (what would become the Kingdome) in February 1968 with 62 percent in favor, the Seattle Pilots were officially born. California Angels executive Marvin Milkes was hired as general manager, and Joe Schultz, a coach with the National League champion St. Louis Cardinals, became manager.

== Team issues ==
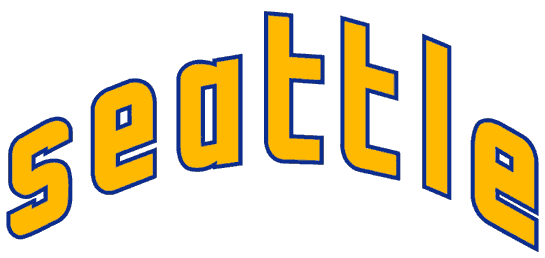

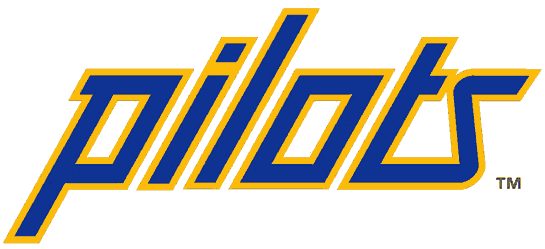
The wordmarks for the Seattle Pilots

With expansion to twelve teams in each league came a realignment into two divisions. Unlike the National League, the AL owners voted to align strictly based on geography. On paper, the newly-formed American League West was by far the weaker division, as it consisted of the two expansion teams and the four clubs that had finished sixth through ninth place in the 1968 campaign. The Oakland Athletics were the only AL West team that had a winning record in 1968, finishing 82–80.

Due to the favorable alignment, Schultz and Milkes both optimistically predicted that the Pilots could finish third in the new division. However, the Pilots experienced the typical struggles of a first-year expansion team. They won their first game, and then their home opener three days later, but only won five more times in the first month. Nevertheless, the Pilots stayed within striking distance of .500 for much of the spring, and were only six games out of the AL West lead as late as June 28. But a disastrous 9–20 July ended even a faint hope of any kind of contention, though they were still in third place as late as August. However, a 6–22 August sent them into the AL West basement for good. The team finished the season with a record of 64–98, 33 games behind division winner Minnesota and five games behind their expansion brethren, the Royals. Only Cleveland had a worse record in the American League. On the plus side, they did finish 12 games ahead of the two National League expansion teams, Montreal and San Diego, both of whom lost 110 games.

However, the team's poor play was the least of its troubles. The most obvious problem was Sick's Stadium. The longtime home of the Rainiers, it had once been considered one of the best ballparks in minor league baseball. However, in 1964, the Rainiers sold the stadium to the city, which was more interested in building a freeway on the stadium site than maintaining it. Indeed, both the Indians and A's had balked at moving to Seattle because of Sick's rapid deterioration. While a condition of awarding the Pilots to Seattle was that Sicks' had to be expanded to 30,000 seats, this had initially been agreed on the understanding that the team would commence play in 1971. Work did not really begin in earnest until January 1969, and only 18,000–19,500 seats (depending on the source) were ready by Opening Day because of numerous delays. The scoreboard was not even ready until the night before the season opener. By June there were finally 25,000 seats in place. Water pressure was almost nonexistent after the seventh inning, especially with crowds above 8,000.

The Pilots had a total attendance of 677,944 people for the season, 20th out of 24 teams in Major League Baseball, and their average attendance per game, 8,268, was also 20th. Seattle finished above fellow cellar dweller teams like the Cleveland Indians, Chicago White Sox, Philadelphia Phillies, and the expansion San Diego Padres. The other two expansion teams outdrew the Pilots, with the Kansas City Royals having 902,414 attend their games while the Montreal Expos finished 10th in attendance with 1,212,608. The highest attendance for a Pilots home game was 23,657, on August 3 against the New York Yankees. The lowest attendance for a Pilot home game was on April 29, their 17th game, when a reported 1,954 fans showed up to watch them play the California Angels. The Pilots lost several hundred thousand dollars their first and only season. The team's new stadium was slated to be built at the Seattle Center, but a petition by stadium opponents ground the project to a halt. The project was later moved to south of downtown and developed for the Kingdome. Television broadcast agreements, normally an important source of revenue for major league sports teams, were non-existent for the Pilots, who could not work out a deal with any TV broadcaster.

Additionally, the Pilots were severely underfinanced. The Sorianos were forced to bring Daley into their group after making almost no effort to court Seattle-based partners. However, the American League did not even consider any other prospective owners. When league president Joe Cronin scouted out the city in 1967, his only interview was with Soriano. Despite their straitened financial condition, the Sorianos balked at corporate support, a critical factor even in those days for sports franchises.

== Move ==
By the end of the season, the Pilots were in trouble as a franchise. However, Daley refused to put up more financing. It was obvious that they would not survive long enough to move into their new park without new ownership. It was also obvious that the timetable for that new stadium would have to be moved up quickly, as Sicks' Stadium was inadequate even for temporary use.

It turned out both the league and commissioner's offices were concerned about the Pilots' viability as well. As early as June, an MLB memo envisaged the Pilots moving to Milwaukee. During the offseason, Soriano made contact with car salesman and former Milwaukee Braves minority owner Bud Selig, who was leading the effort to bring major league baseball back to Milwaukee. They met in secret for over a month towards the end of the season, and during Game 1 of the World Series, Soriano agreed to sell the Pilots to Selig for $10.8 million. Selig would then move the team to Milwaukee. However, the remaining owners of the Pilots turned it down in the face of pressure from Washington's two senators, Warren Magnuson and Henry M. "Scoop" Jackson, as well as state attorney general Slade Gorton.

Local theater chain owner Fred Danz, restaurateur Dave Cohn, and Westin Hotels head Eddie Carlson came forward with an offer to buy out the Sorianos and reduce Daley's stake to 30 percent. The $10 million deal received preliminary approval in December. However, the deal fizzled when it emerged that three months earlier, the Bank of California had called in a $4 million loan (or $3.5 million, depending on the source) it made to the Soriano-Daley group to finance the purchase of the franchise. No one in the American League knew that the loan had even existed. Faced with having to raise more money than expected, Danz walked away. In January 1970, Carlson put together a nonprofit group, modeled loosely on the ownership structure of the National Football League's Green Bay Packers, to buy the team. However, the other American League owners rejected the idea almost out of hand. Chicago White Sox owner John Allyn expressed the concerns of the owners when he said that under Carlson's plan, "no one person, group, or firm" would be responsible for team expenses. The owners also feared it would devalue the other clubs' worth. A slightly modified deal came one vote short of approval.

== Bankruptcy ==
After a winter and spring full of court action, the owners loaned Soriano and Daley $650,000 to send the team to spring training and settle the Pilots' most immediate debts. Under new manager Dave Bristol, the Pilots arrived for spring training in Tempe, Arizona unsure of where they would play. However, Soriano and Daley declared bankruptcy, claiming that the loan was not enough to keep the team alive. The league stripped Soriano and Daley of their authority over the Pilots and took control of the team.

Soon afterward, the league gave tentative approval to sell the Pilots to Selig's Milwaukee group, but final approval was delayed due to the state seeking an injunction to stop the sale. PNSI's bankruptcy filing, however, was intended to forestall post-sale legal action. At the bankruptcy hearing a week later, Milkes testified there was not enough money to pay the coaches, players, and office staff. Had Milkes been more than 10 days late in paying the players, they would have all become free agents. This would effectively reduce the AL to eleven teams for the 1970 season, which would have left the schedule in chaos. With this in mind and with no credible alternatives to Selig's offer, Federal Bankruptcy Referee Sidney C. Volinn declared the Pilots bankrupt on March 31—seven days before Opening Day—clearing the way for them to move to Milwaukee. The team's equipment had been sitting in Provo, Utah, with the drivers awaiting word on whether to drive toward Seattle or Milwaukee.

Selig intended to change the team's colors to navy and red in honor of the minor-league Brewers of his youth, colors shared by the Milwaukee Braves. Instead, due to the move being finalized at such a late date, the Brewers were stuck using the existing Pilots' blue and gold sets, with the team wordmark going from the Seattle design language to generic block lettering. Though darkened to navy blue and a wheat-shaded gold in 2000, the Brewers maintain the same general color scheme as the Pilots did. Also due to the late timing, the Brewers inherited the Pilots' place in the AL West; until the 1972 realignment of the team into the AL East in 1972, they were saddled with some of the longest road trips in baseball.

The move also came too late for Topps to change its baseball cards for the 1970 season, so the 1970 Topps set has cards for the Pilots.

== Ball Four ==
Jim Bouton was a Pilots relief pitcher through most of 1969, after the team bought his contract from the New York Yankees in mid-1968. His book Ball Four is based on a journal that he kept during the 1969 season. Bouton spent most of the season with Seattle, although he was traded to the Houston Astros in late August for Dooley Womack.

== Lawsuit and enfranchisement of the Seattle Mariners ==
In 1970, after the Pilots' move, the City of Seattle, King County, and the state of Washington (represented by then-State Attorney General Slade Gorton) sued the American League for breach of contract. Confident that Major League Baseball would return to Seattle within a few years, King County built the multi-purpose Kingdome, which would become home to the NFL's expansion Seattle Seahawks in 1976. The construction of the Kingdome had originally been approved by area voters as a condition of getting the Pilots, but had not begun before the team left.

The Pilots lawsuit continued until 1976. At trial, the American League offered to give Seattle an expansion baseball franchise in return for dropping the suit, and details were ironed out over the next year. To keep the league with an even number of teams, a formal expansion proceeding was held, with a second team, the Blue Jays, being awarded to the city of Toronto (also allowing both leagues to place a team in Canada, the National League's Montreal Expos [now the Washington Nationals] having been established in 1969). The new Seattle team, to begin play in 1977, would be owned by a consortium led by entertainer Danny Kaye, along with Stanley Golub, Walter Schoenfeld, Lester Smith, James Stillwell, Jr. and James A. Walsh. Seattle's new team would be known as the Mariners and would initially incorporate the same blue and gold colors used by the Pilots. Since 1993, the team's colors have been navy blue, teal, and silver, though the original color scheme has been utilized for throwbacks, along with the current City Connect uniforms which utilize a modern equivalent to the Pilots' lowercase font.

== Aftermath ==
The newly transplanted Milwaukee Brewers did not find immediate success. Their first 8 seasons were spent in the basement of the American League; their first winning season came in 1978 and their first postseason appearance in 1981. The Brewers won the American League pennant one year later only to fall in seven games to the Cardinals. The Brewers languished in playoff limbo for the next 26 years as they endured one of the longest postseason droughts in MLB history.

Their luck turned in the 2010s. Thanks to Christian Yelich and others, the team became perennial contenders despite their low payroll and MLB's smallest market. In 2026, 57 years after being established in Seattle and 56 years after moving to Milwaukee, the team won the 2026 World Series. In their first Series since 1982, they defeated the Tampa Bay Rays, 4 games to 1, earning their first World Series trophy.

The Seattle Mariners, their replacements, have yet to win a World Series or an American League pennant.

== List of Seattle Pilots seasons ==
Seattle Pilots season records
Year	Record	Win %	Place	Playoffs	Notes
1969	64–98	.395	6th in AL West	—	The only season in Seattle.

== See also ==
- History of the Milwaukee Brewers § Roots in Seattle
- Milwaukee Brewers § Seattle (1969)
- Seattle Mariners
- Selig v. United States
