= 1970 Oakland Athletics season =

1970 Oakland Athletics
- League: American League
- Division: West
- Ballpark: Oakland-Alameda County Coliseum
- City: Oakland, California
- Record: 89–73 (.549)
- Owners: Charles O. Finley
- Managers: John McNamara
- Television: KBHK-TV
- Radio: KNBR (Monte Moore, Harry Caray)

The 1970 Oakland Athletics season was the 70th season for the Oakland Athletics franchise, all as members of the American League, and their 3rd season in Oakland. The Athletics finished the season with a record of 89 wins and 73 losses. In 1970, owner Charlie Finley officially changed the team name from the Athletics to the "A's". An "apostrophe-s" was added to the cap and uniform emblem to reflect that fact.

== Offseason ==
During the off-season, Reggie Jackson sought an increase in salary, and A's owner Charlie Finley threatened to send Jackson to the minors. Commissioner Bowie Kuhn successfully intervened in their dispute. Reggie Jackson demanded $60,000 per season, while he was offered $40,000 by Charlie Finley. Both parties settled on $45,000, but Jackson's numbers in 1970 dropped sharply, as he hit just 23 home runs while batting .237.

=== Notable transactions ===
- December 1, 1969: Manny Trillo was drafted by the Athletics from the Philadelphia Phillies in the 1969 rule 5 draft.
- December 5, 1969: Danny Cater and Ossie Chavarria were traded by the Athletics to the New York Yankees for Al Downing and Frank Fernández.
- December 7, 1969: George Lauzerique and Ted Kubiak were traded by the Athletics to the Milwaukee Brewers for Diego Seguí and Ray Oyler.
- January 15, 1970: Phil Roof, Mike Hershberger, Lew Krausse Jr., and Ken Sanders were traded by the Athletics to the Milwaukee Brewers for Don Mincher and Ron Clark.
- January 17, 1970: 1970 Major League Baseball draft (January draft) notable picks:

Round 4: Mitchell Page (did not sign)

Secondary Phase

Round 1: Vic Harris

== Regular season ==
- During the 1970 season, there were rumours of the Athletics attempting to relocate to Toronto.
- At the end of May, the Athletics were 25–23, and 8 games back of the first place Minnesota Twins.
- September 21: Vida Blue threw a no-hitter versus the Minnesota Twins, winning 6-0. A walk by Harmon Killebrew prevented Blue from pitching a perfect game.
- The club hired Harry Caray to do the play by play for the Athletics. Charlie Finley wanted Caray to change his broadcast chant of Holy Cow to Holy Mule. Caray refused and left after the season.

=== Season standings ===
AL West
Team	W	L	Pct.	GB	Home	Road
Minnesota Twins	98	64	.605	—	51‍–‍30	47‍–‍34
Oakland Athletics	89	73	.549	9	49‍–‍32	40‍–‍41
California Angels	86	76	.531	12	43‍–‍38	43‍–‍38
Kansas City Royals	65	97	.401	33	35‍–‍44	30‍–‍53
Milwaukee Brewers	65	97	.401	33	38‍–‍42	27‍–‍55
Chicago White Sox	56	106	.346	42	31‍–‍53	25‍–‍53

=== Record vs. opponents ===
1970 American League record Sources:
Team	BAL	BOS	CAL	CWS	CLE	DET	KC	MIL	MIN	NYY	OAK	WAS
Baltimore	—	13–5	7–5	9–3	14–4	11–7	12–0	7–5	5–7	11–7	7–5	12–6
Boston	5–13	—	5–7	8–4	12–6	9–9	7–5	5–7	7–5	10–8	7–5	12–6
California	5–7	7–5	—	12–6	6–6	6–6	10–8	12–6	8–10	5–7	8–10	7–5
Chicago	3–9	4–8	6–12	—	6–6	6–6	7–11	7–11	6–12	5–7	2–16	4–8
Cleveland	4–14	6–12	6–6	6–6	—	7–11	8–4	7–5	6–6	8–10	7–5	11–7
Detroit	7–11	9–9	6–6	6–6	11–7	—	6–6	8–4	4–8	7–11	6–6	9–9
Kansas City	0–12	5–7	8–10	11–7	4–8	6–6	—	12–6	5–13	1–11	7–11	6–6
Milwaukee	5–7	7–5	6–12	11–7	5–7	4–8	6–12	—	5–13	3–9–1	8–10	5–7
Minnesota	7–5	5–7	10–8	12–6	6–6	8–4	13–5	13–5	—	5–7	13–5	6–6
New York	7–11	8–10	7–5	7–5	10–8	11–7	11–1	9–3–1	7–5	—	6–6	10–8
Oakland	5–7	5–7	10–8	16–2	5–7	6–6	11–7	10–8	5–13	6–6	—	10–2
Washington	6–12	6–12	5–7	8–4	7–11	9–9	6–6	7–5	6–6	8–10	2–10	—

=== Notable transactions ===
- May 18, 1970: Roberto Peña was traded by the Athletics to the Milwaukee Brewers for John Donaldson.
- June 4, 1970: 1970 Major League Baseball draft (June Draft) notable picks:

Round 1: Dan Ford (18th pick)

- June 11, 1970: Al Downing and Tito Francona were traded by the Athletics to the Milwaukee Brewers for Steve Hovley.

=== Roster ===
1970 Oakland Athletics
Roster
Pitchers: 17,35 Vida Blue; 29 Chuck Dobson; 38 Al Downing; 34 Rollie Fingers; 28 Mudcat Grant; 27 Catfish Hunter; 14,16 Marcel Lachemann; 25 Paul Lindblad; 36 Bob Locker; 13 Blue Moon Odom; 35 Darrell Osteen; 45 Roberto Rodríguez; 33 Jim Roland; 24 Diego Seguí; 46 Fred Talbot; 16 Dooley Womack	Catchers: 10 Dave Duncan; 39 Frank Fernández; 12 Larry Haney; 38,54 Gene Tenace; Infielders: 6 Sal Bando; 19 Bert Campaneris; 2 John Donaldson; 2,21 Jim Driscoll; 36 Tito Francona; 1 Dick Green; 32 Bob Johnson; 22 Tony La Russa; 5,30 Don Mincher; 14 Roberto Peña	Outfielders: 8 Felipe Alou; 15 Bobby Brooks; 12,42 Tommy Davis; 23 Steve Hovley; 9 Reggie Jackson; 32 Allan Lewis; 7 Rick Monday; 26 Joe Rudi; 31 José Tartabull	Manager: 11 John McNamara; Coaches: 5 Joe DiMaggio (Hitting); 43 Bobby Hofman (Third base); 41 Charley Lau (First base); 44 Vern Hoscheit (Bullpen); 40 Bill Posedel (Pitching)

== Player stats ==
=== Batting ===
==== Starters by position ====
Note: Pos = Position; G = Games played; AB = At bats; H = Hits; Avg. = Batting average; HR = Home runs; RBI = Runs batted in

Pos	Player	G	AB	H	Avg.	HR	RBI
C	Frank Fernández	94	252	54	.214	15	44
1B	Don Mincher	140	463	114	.246	27	74
2B	Dick Green	135	384	73	.190	4	29
SS	Bert Campaneris	147	603	168	.279	22	64
3B	Sal Bando	155	502	132	.263	20	75
LF	Felipe Alou	154	575	156	.271	8	55
CF	Rick Monday	112	376	109	.290	10	37
RF	Reggie Jackson	149	426	101	.237	23	66

==== Other batters ====
Note: G = Games played; AB = At bats; H = Hits; Avg. = Batting average; HR = Home runs; RBI = Runs batted in

Player	G	AB	H	Avg.	HR	RBI
Joe Rudi	106	350	108	.309	11	42
Dave Duncan	86	232	60	.259	10	29
Tommy Davis	66	200	58	.290	1	27
Tony La Russa	52	106	21	.198	0	6
Gene Tenace	38	105	32	.305	7	20
Steve Hovley	72	100	19	.190	0	1
John Donaldson	41	89	22	.247	1	11
Roberto Peña	19	58	15	.259	0	3
Jim Driscoll	21	52	10	.192	1	2
Bob Johnson	30	46	8	.174	1	2
Tito Francona	32	33	8	.242	1	6
Bobby Brooks	7	18	6	.333	2	5
José Tartabull	24	13	3	.231	0	2
Allan Lewis	9	8	2	.250	1	1
Larry Haney	2	2	0	.000	0	0

=== Pitching ===
==== Starting pitchers ====
Note: G = Games pitched; IP = Innings pitched; W = Wins; L = Losses; ERA = Earned run average; SO = Strikeouts

Player	G	IP	W	L	ERA	SO
Chuck Dobson	41	267.0	16	15	3.74	149
Catfish Hunter	40	262.1	18	14	3.81	178
Blue Moon Odom	29	156.1	9	8	3.80	88
Vida Blue	6	38.2	2	0	2.09	35

==== Other pitchers ====
Note: G = Games pitched; IP = Innings pitched; W = Wins; L = Losses; ERA = Earned run average; SO = Strikeouts

Player	G	IP	W	L	ERA	SO
Diego Seguí	47	162.0	10	10	2.56	95
Rollie Fingers	45	148.0	7	9	3.65	79
Al Downing	10	41.0	3	3	3.95	26
Darrell Osteen	3	5.2	1	0	6.35	3

==== Relief pitchers ====
Note: G = Games pitched; W = Wins; L = Losses; SV = Saves; ERA = Earned run average; SO = Strikeouts

Player	G	W	L	SV	ERA	SO
Mudcat Grant	72	6	2	24	1.82	54
Paul Lindblad	62	8	2	3	2.70	42
Marcel Lachemann	41	3	3	3	2.78	39
Bob Locker	38	3	3	4	2.88	33
Jim Roland	28	3	3	2	2.70	26
Roberto Rodríguez	6	0	0	0	2.92	8
Dooley Womack	2	0	0	0	15.00	3
Fred Talbot	1	0	1	0	10.80	0

== Awards and honors ==
- Bert Campaneris led the American League in Stolen Bases (42)

== Farm system ==
Level	Team	League	Manager
AAA	Iowa Oaks	American Association	Sherm Lollar
AA	Birmingham A's	Southern League	Phil Cavarretta
A	Burlington Bees	Midwest League	Roy Sievers
A-Short Season	Coos Bay-North Bend A's	Northwest League	Harry Bright
