= 1969 Oakland Athletics season =

1969 Oakland Athletics
- League: American League
- Division: West
- Ballpark: Oakland-Alameda County Coliseum
- City: Oakland, California
- Record: 88–74 (.543)
- Owners: Charles O. Finley
- Managers: Hank Bauer, John McNamara
- Television: KBHK-TV
- Radio: KNBR (Monte Moore, Al Helfer)

The 1969 Oakland Athletics season was the 69th season for the Oakland Athletics franchise, all as members of the American League, and their 2nd season in Oakland. The Athletics finished the season with a record of 88 wins and 74 losses. With its expansion to 12 teams in 1969, the American League had been divided into two 6-team divisions. In their first year in the newly established American League West, the Athletics finished second, nine games behind the Minnesota Twins. It was the first time they had finished in the first place in a division since 1952 Philadelphia Athletics season. Paid attendance for the season was 778,232.

== Offseason ==
- October 15, 1968: Joe Keough was drafted from the Athletics by the Kansas City Royals as the 8th pick in the 1968 MLB expansion draft.
- December 2, 1968: Darrell Evans was drafted from the Athletics by the Atlanta Braves in the 1968 rule 5 draft.

== Regular season ==
- Reggie Jackson hit 47 home runs in 1969, and was briefly ahead of the pace that Roger Maris set when he broke the single-season record for home runs with 61 in 1961, and that of Babe Ruth when he set the previous record of 60 in 1927.
- The club ranked second in the American League Western division. With 13 games left in the season, Hank Bauer was replaced as Field Manager by John McNamara. McNamara compiled a won loss record of 8–5 to help the A's finish with 88 wins and 74 losses, an improvement of six wins compared to the previous season.

=== Season standings ===
AL West
| Team | W | L | Pct. | GB | Home | Road |
|---|---|---|---|---|---|---|
| Minnesota Twins | 97 | 65 | .599 | — | 57‍–‍24 | 40‍–‍41 |
| Oakland Athletics | 88 | 74 | .543 | 9 | 49‍–‍32 | 39‍–‍42 |
| California Angels | 71 | 91 | .438 | 26 | 43‍–‍38 | 28‍–‍53 |
| Kansas City Royals | 69 | 93 | .426 | 28 | 36‍–‍45 | 33‍–‍48 |
| Chicago White Sox | 68 | 94 | .420 | 29 | 41‍–‍40 | 27‍–‍54 |
| Seattle Pilots | 64 | 98 | .395 | 33 | 34‍–‍47 | 30‍–‍51 |

=== Record vs. opponents ===
1969 American League records Sources:
| Team | BAL | BOS | CAL | CWS | CLE | DET | KC | MIN | NYY | OAK | SEA | WAS |
|---|---|---|---|---|---|---|---|---|---|---|---|---|
| Baltimore | — | 10–8 | 6–6 | 9–3 | 13–5 | 11–7 | 11–1 | 8–4 | 11–7 | 8–4 | 9–3 | 13–5 |
| Boston | 8–10 | — | 8–4 | 5–7 | 12–6 | 10–8 | 10–2 | 7–5 | 11–7 | 4–8 | 6–6 | 6–12 |
| California | 6–6 | 4–8 | — | 9–9 | 8–4 | 5–7 | 9–9 | 7–11 | 3–9 | 6–12 | 9–9–1 | 5–7 |
| Chicago | 3–9 | 7–5 | 9–9 | — | 8–4 | 3–9 | 8–10 | 5–13 | 3–9 | 8–10 | 10–8 | 4–8 |
| Cleveland | 5–13 | 6–12 | 4–8 | 4–8 | — | 7–11 | 7–5 | 5–7 | 9–8 | 5–7 | 7–5 | 3–15 |
| Detroit | 7–11 | 8–10 | 7–5 | 9–3 | 11–7 | — | 8–4 | 6–6 | 10–8 | 7–5 | 10–2 | 7–11 |
| Kansas City | 1–11 | 2–10 | 9–9 | 10–8 | 5–7 | 4–8 | — | 8–10 | 5–7–1 | 8–10 | 10–8 | 7–5 |
| Minnesota | 4–8 | 5–7 | 11–7 | 13–5 | 7–5 | 6–6 | 10–8 | — | 10–2 | 13–5 | 12–6 | 6–6 |
| New York | 7–11 | 7–11 | 9–3 | 9–3 | 8–9 | 8–10 | 7–5–1 | 2–10 | — | 6–6 | 7–5 | 10–8 |
| Oakland | 4–8 | 8–4 | 12–6 | 10–8 | 7–5 | 5–7 | 10–8 | 5–13 | 6–6 | — | 13–5 | 8–4 |
| Seattle | 3–9 | 6–6 | 9–9–1 | 8–10 | 5–7 | 2–10 | 8–10 | 6–12 | 5–7 | 5–13 | — | 7–5 |
| Washington | 5–13 | 12–6 | 7–5 | 8–4 | 15–3 | 11–7 | 5–7 | 6–6 | 8–10 | 4–8 | 5–7 | — |

=== Opening Day starters ===
- Sal Bando
- Bert Campaneris
- Danny Cater
- Dave Duncan
- Dick Green
- Mike Hershberger
- Reggie Jackson
- Rick Monday
- Blue Moon Odom

=== Notable transactions ===
- June 5, 1969: 1969 Major League Baseball draft (June Draft) notable picks:

Round 1: Don Stanhouse (9th pick).
Round 2: Tommy Sandt
Round 3: Steve Lawson
Round 6: Jim Sundberg (did not sign)
Round 8: Glenn Abbott
Round 13: John Stearns (did not sign)
Round 19: Charlie Chant

- June 14, 1969: John Donaldson was traded by the Athletics to the Seattle Pilots for Larry Haney.

=== Reggie Jackson ===
In the offseason, Jackson demanded a salary increase from $10,000 to $25,000. Jackson would settle at $20,000. Reggie Jackson hit two home runs versus the Washington Senators, with President Richard Nixon in the crowd. By July 1, the A's had played in 71 games and Jackson had hit 30 home runs, 62 RBI, .287 batting average and a 1.145 OPS. On July 2, Reggie Jackson would hit three home runs versus the Seattle Pilots to raise his season total to 34 home runs. He was on pace to break the home run record set by Roger Maris eight years earlier. By the end of July, Jackson had 40 home runs but he only hit 5 home runs in August. In September, Jackson was hospitalized with a skin rash and was only able to hit 2 home runs. Jackson still managed to lead the American League with 123 runs scored.

=== Roster ===
1969 Oakland Athletics
Roster
| Pitchers: 21 Vida Blue; 29 Chuck Dobson; 34 Rollie Fingers; 27 Catfish Hunter; 20 Lew Krausse Jr.; 16,24 Marcel Lachemann; 28 George Lauzerique; 25 Paul Lindblad; 30 Jim Nash; 13 Blue Moon Odom; 42 Juan Pizarro; 33 Jim Roland; 22 Ed Sprague; 17 Fred Talbot; 11 John Wyatt | Catchers: 10 Dave Duncan; 12 Larry Haney; 17 Jim Pagliaroni; 4 Phil Roof; 24 Gene Tenace; Infielders: 6 Sal Bando; 19 Bert Campaneris; 2 Danny Cater; 12 John Donaldson; 36 Tito Francona; 1 Dick Green; 32 Bob Johnson; 14 Ted Kubiak; 23,31 Ray Webster | Outfielders: 15 Bobby Brooks; 3 Mike Hershberger; 9 Reggie Jackson; 37 Bill McNulty; 7 Rick Monday; 24 Joe Nossek; 35 Tommie Reynolds; 36,26 Joe Rudi; 31 José Tartabull; Other batters: 11 Tony La Russa; 8,36 Allan Lewis | Manager: 42 Hank Bauer; 41 John McNamara; Coaches: 5 Joe DiMaggio (Hitting); 43 Bobby Hofman (First base); 44 Vern Hoscheit (Bullpen); 41 John McNamara (Third base); 40 Bill Posedel (Pitching) |

== Player stats ==
=== Batting ===
==== Starters by position ====
Note: Pos = Position; G = Games played; AB = At bats; H = Hits; Avg. = Batting average; HR = Home runs; RBI = Runs batted in

| Pos | Player | G | AB | H | Avg. | HR | RBI |
|---|---|---|---|---|---|---|---|
| C | Phil Roof | 106 | 247 | 58 | .235 | 2 | 19 |
| 1B | Danny Cater | 152 | 584 | 153 | .262 | 10 | 76 |
| 2B | Dick Green | 136 | 483 | 133 | .275 | 12 | 64 |
| 3B | Sal Bando | 162 | 609 | 171 | .281 | 31 | 113 |
| SS | Bert Campaneris | 135 | 547 | 142 | .260 | 2 | 25 |
| LF | Tommie Reynolds | 107 | 315 | 81 | .257 | 2 | 20 |
| CF | Rick Monday | 122 | 399 | 108 | .271 | 12 | 54 |
| RF | Reggie Jackson | 152 | 549 | 151 | .275 | 47 | 118 |

==== Other batters ====
Note: G = Games played; AB = At bats; H = Hits; Avg. = Batting average; HR = Home runs; RBI = Runs batted in

| Player | G | AB | H | Avg. | HR | RBI |
|---|---|---|---|---|---|---|
| Ted Kubiak | 92 | 305 | 76 | .249 | 2 | 27 |
| José Tartabull | 75 | 266 | 71 | .267 | 0 | 11 |
| Mike Hershberger | 51 | 129 | 26 | .202 | 1 | 10 |
| Dave Duncan | 58 | 127 | 16 | .126 | 3 | 22 |
| Joe Rudi | 35 | 122 | 23 | .189 | 2 | 6 |
| Larry Haney | 53 | 86 | 13 | .151 | 2 | 12 |
| Tito Francona | 32 | 85 | 29 | .341 | 3 | 20 |
| Bobby Brooks | 29 | 79 | 19 | .241 | 3 | 10 |
| Ray Webster | 64 | 77 | 20 | .260 | 1 | 13 |
| Bob Johnson | 51 | 67 | 23 | .343 | 1 | 9 |
| Gene Tenace | 16 | 38 | 6 | .158 | 1 | 2 |
| Jim Pagliaroni | 14 | 27 | 4 | .148 | 1 | 2 |
| Bill McNulty | 5 | 17 | 0 | .000 | 0 | 0 |
| John Donaldson | 12 | 13 | 1 | .077 | 0 | 0 |
| Tony La Russa | 8 | 8 | 0 | .000 | 0 | 0 |
| Joe Nossek | 13 | 6 | 0 | .000 | 0 | 0 |
| Allan Lewis | 12 | 1 | 0 | .000 | 0 | 0 |

=== Pitching ===
==== Starting pitchers ====
Note: G = Games pitched; IP = Innings pitched; W = Wins; L = Losses; ERA = Earned run average; SO = Strikeouts

| Player | G | IP | W | L | ERA | SO |
|---|---|---|---|---|---|---|
| Catfish Hunter | 38 | 247.0 | 12 | 15 | 3.35 | 150 |
| Chuck Dobson | 35 | 235.1 | 15 | 13 | 3.86 | 137 |
| Blue Moon Odom | 32 | 231.1 | 15 | 6 | 2.92 | 150 |
| Jim Nash | 26 | 115.1 | 8 | 8 | 3.67 | 75 |

==== Other pitchers ====
Note: G = Games pitched; IP = Innings pitched; W = Wins; L = Losses; ERA = Earned run average; SO = Strikeouts

| Player | G | IP | W | L | ERA | SO |
|---|---|---|---|---|---|---|
| Lew Krausse Jr. | 43 | 140.0 | 7 | 7 | 4.44 | 85 |
| George Lauzerique | 19 | 61.1 | 3 | 4 | 4.70 | 39 |
| Vida Blue | 12 | 42.0 | 1 | 1 | 6.64 | 24 |
| Fred Talbot | 12 | 19.0 | 1 | 2 | 5.21 | 9 |

==== Relief pitchers ====
Note: G = Games pitched; W = Wins; L = Losses; SV = Saves; ERA = Earned run average; SO = Strikeouts

| Player | G | W | L | SV | ERA | SO |
|---|---|---|---|---|---|---|
| Rollie Fingers | 60 | 6 | 7 | 12 | 3.71 | 61 |
| Paul Lindblad | 60 | 9 | 6 | 9 | 4.14 | 64 |
| Jim Roland | 39 | 5 | 1 | 1 | 2.19 | 48 |
| Marcel Lachemann | 28 | 4 | 1 | 2 | 3.95 | 16 |
| Ed Sprague | 27 | 1 | 1 | 2 | 4.47 | 20 |
| John Wyatt | 4 | 0 | 1 | 0 | 5.40 | 5 |
| Juan Pizarro | 3 | 1 | 1 | 1 | 2.35 | 4 |

== Farm system ==
| Level | Team | League | Manager |
|---|---|---|---|
| AAA | Iowa Oaks | American Association | Jimmy Williams |
| AA | Birmingham A's | Southern League | Gus Niarhos |
| A | Lodi Crushers | California League | Billy Klaus and Eli Grba |
| A | Burlington Bees | Midwest League | Roy Sievers |
| A-Short Season | Tri-City A's | Northwest League | Billy Herman |
