= 1970 Milwaukee Brewers season =

1970 Milwaukee Brewers
- League: American League
- Division: West
- Ballpark: Milwaukee County Stadium
- City: Milwaukee, Wisconsin
- Record: 65–97 (.401)
- Divisional place: 4th
- Owners: Bud Selig
- General managers: Marvin Milkes
- Managers: Dave Bristol
- Television: WTMJ-TV
- Radio: WEMP (Merle Harmon, Tom Collins)
- Stats: ESPN.com; Baseball Reference

The 1970 Milwaukee Brewers season was the second season for the franchise. The team finished fourth in the American League West with a record of 65 wins and 97 losses, 33 games behind the Minnesota Twins. This was the team's inaugural season in Milwaukee, Wisconsin, after spending its first year of existence in Seattle, Washington, as the Pilots.

== Offseason ==
=== Relocation to Milwaukee ===
During the offseason, Dewey Soriano, president of the financially strapped Seattle Pilots, crossed paths with Bud Selig, a Milwaukee car dealer who had been working to bring baseball back to Milwaukee since the Braves (of which he'd been a minority owner) left for Atlanta after the 1965 season. They met in secret for over a month after the end of the season, and during Game 1 of the World Series, Soriano agreed to sell the Pilots to Selig for $10 to $13 million (depending on the source). Selig would then move the team to Milwaukee and rename it the Brewers. However, the owners turned it down in the face of pressure from Washington's two senators, Warren Magnuson and Henry (Scoop) Jackson, as well as state attorney general Slade Gorton. MLB asked Soriano and chairman William Daley to find a local buyer.

Local theater chain owner Fred Danz came forward in October 1969 with a $10 million deal, but it fizzled when the Bank of California called in a $4 million loan it had made to Soriano and Daley for startup costs. In January 1970, Westin Hotels owner Eddie Carlson put together a nonprofit group to buy the team. However, the owners rejected the idea almost out of hand since it would have devalued the other clubs' worth. A more traditional deal came one vote short of approval.

After a winter and spring full of court action, the Pilots reported for spring training under new manager Dave Bristol unsure of where they would play. The owners had given tentative approval to the Milwaukee group, but the state of Washington got an injunction on March 17 to stop the deal. Soriano immediately filed for bankruptcy — a move intended to forestall any post-sale legal action. At the bankruptcy hearing a week later, general manager Marvin Milkes testified there was not enough money to pay the coaches, players and office staff. Had Milkes been more than 10 days late in paying the players, they would have all become free agents and left Seattle without a team for the 1970 season. With this in mind, Federal Bankruptcy Referee Sidney C. Volinn declared the Pilots bankrupt on March 31—seven days before Opening Day—clearing the way for them to move to Milwaukee. The team's equipment had been sitting in Provo, Utah, with the drivers awaiting word on whether to drive toward Seattle or Milwaukee. MLB returned to Seattle in 1977, when the Mariners began play at the Kingdome.

Coincidentally, Milwaukee had gained its previous team under circumstances similar to some of those surrounding this move. The Braves had moved from Boston to Milwaukee only a few weeks before the 1953 season.

=== Notable transactions ===
- November 21, 1969: Mike Marshall was purchased from the Seattle Pilots by the Houston Astros.
- December 7, 1969: Diego Seguí and Ray Oyler were traded by the Seattle Pilots to the Oakland Athletics for George Lauzerique and Ted Kubiak.
- January 15, 1970: Don Mincher and Ron Clark were traded by the Seattle Pilots to the Oakland Athletics for Phil Roof, Mike Hershberger, Lew Krausse Jr., and Ken Sanders.

== Regular season ==
=== Opening Day starters ===
- Max Alvis
- Tommy Harper
- Mike Hegan
- Steve Hovley
- Lew Krausse Jr.
- Ted Kubiak
- Jerry McNertney
- Russ Snyder
- Danny Walton

=== Season standings ===
AL West
Team	W	L	Pct.	GB	Home	Road
Minnesota Twins	98	64	.605	—	51‍–‍30	47‍–‍34
Oakland Athletics	89	73	.549	9	49‍–‍32	40‍–‍41
California Angels	86	76	.531	12	43‍–‍38	43‍–‍38
Kansas City Royals	65	97	.401	33	35‍–‍44	30‍–‍53
Milwaukee Brewers	65	97	.401	33	38‍–‍42	27‍–‍55
Chicago White Sox	56	106	.346	42	31‍–‍53	25‍–‍53

=== Record vs. opponents ===
1970 American League record Sources:
Team	BAL	BOS	CAL	CWS	CLE	DET	KC	MIL	MIN	NYY	OAK	WAS
Baltimore	—	13–5	7–5	9–3	14–4	11–7	12–0	7–5	5–7	11–7	7–5	12–6
Boston	5–13	—	5–7	8–4	12–6	9–9	7–5	5–7	7–5	10–8	7–5	12–6
California	5–7	7–5	—	12–6	6–6	6–6	10–8	12–6	8–10	5–7	8–10	7–5
Chicago	3–9	4–8	6–12	—	6–6	6–6	7–11	7–11	6–12	5–7	2–16	4–8
Cleveland	4–14	6–12	6–6	6–6	—	7–11	8–4	7–5	6–6	8–10	7–5	11–7
Detroit	7–11	9–9	6–6	6–6	11–7	—	6–6	8–4	4–8	7–11	6–6	9–9
Kansas City	0–12	5–7	8–10	11–7	4–8	6–6	—	12–6	5–13	1–11	7–11	6–6
Milwaukee	5–7	7–5	6–12	11–7	5–7	4–8	6–12	—	5–13	3–9–1	8–10	5–7
Minnesota	7–5	5–7	10–8	12–6	6–6	8–4	13–5	13–5	—	5–7	13–5	6–6
New York	7–11	8–10	7–5	7–5	10–8	11–7	11–1	9–3–1	7–5	—	6–6	10–8
Oakland	5–7	5–7	10–8	16–2	5–7	6–6	11–7	10–8	5–13	6–6	—	10–2
Washington	6–12	6–12	5–7	8–4	7–11	9–9	6–6	7–5	6–6	8–10	2–10	—

=== Notable transactions ===
- April 1, 1970: Steve Barber was released by the Brewers.
- May 11, 1970: Wayne Comer was traded by the Brewers to the Washington Senators for Hank Allen and Ron Theobald.
- May 18, 1970: John Donaldson was traded by the Brewers to the Oakland Athletics for Roberto Peña.
- June 4, 1970: John Tamargo was drafted by the Brewers in the 4th round of the secondary phase of the 1970 Major League Baseball draft, but did not sign.
- June 11, 1970: Steve Hovley was traded by the Brewers to the Oakland Athletics for Al Downing and Tito Francona.
- June 15, 1970: John O'Donoghue was traded by the Brewers to the Montreal Expos for José Herrera.
- August 20, 1970: Floyd Wicker was purchased by the Brewers from the Montreal Expos.

=== Roster ===
1970 Milwaukee Brewers
Roster
Pitchers: 46 Dave Baldwin; 39 Bobby Bolin; 32 Gene Brabender; 31 Bruce Brubaker; 36 Al Downing; 49 Dick Ellsworth; 25 John Gelnar; 47 Bob Humphreys; 24 Lew Krausse; 49 George Lauzerique; 23 Bob Locker; 42 Skip Lockwood; 38 Bob Meyer; 35 John Morris; 43 John O'Donoghue; 33 Marty Pattin; 41 Ray Peters; 20 Ken Sanders; 48 Wayne Twitchell	Catchers: 15 Jerry McNertney; 5 Phil Roof; Infielders: 10 Max Alvis; 9 Tito Francona; 16 Gus Gil; 34 Greg Goossen; 21 Tommy Harper; 8 Mike Hegan; 11 John Kennedy; 1 Ted Kubiak; 28 Roberto Peña; 9 Rich Rollins; 45 Fred Stanley	Outfielders: 44 Hank Allen; 19 Bob Burda; 20 Wayne Comer; 6 Mike Hershberger; 36 Steve Hovley; 17 Pete Koegel; 11 Dave May; 2 Ted Savage; 22 Bernie Smith; 7 Russ Snyder; 28 Sandy Valdespino; 12 Danny Walton; 40 Floyd Wicker	Manager: 4 Dave Bristol; Coaches: 27 Cal Ermer (Third base); 26 Roy McMillan (First base); 30 Jackie Moore (Bullpen); 18 Wes Stock (Pitching)

== Player stats ==
= Indicates team leader

=== Batting ===
==== Starters by position ====
Note: Pos = Position; G = Games played; AB = At bats; H = Hits; Avg. = Batting average; HR = Home runs; RBI = Runs batted in

Pos	Player	G	AB	H	Avg.	HR	RBI
C	Phil Roof	110	321	73	.227	13	37
1B	Mike Hegan	148	476	116	.244	11	52
2B	Ted Kubiak	158	540	136	.252	4	41
3B	Tommy Harper	154	604	179	.296	31	82
SS	Roberto Peña	121	416	99	.238	3	42
LF	Danny Walton	117	397	102	.257	17	66
CF	Dave May	100	342	82	.240	7	31
RF	Bob Burda	78	222	55	.248	4	20

==== Other batters ====
Note: G = Games played; AB = At bats; H = Hits; Avg. = Batting average; HR = Home runs; RBI = Runs batted in

Player	G	AB	H	Avg.	HR	RBI
Jerry McNertney	111	296	72	.243	6	22
Ted Savage	114	276	77	.279	12	50
Russ Snyder	124	276	64	.232	4	31
Steve Hovley	40	135	38	.281	0	16
Gus Gil	64	119	22	.185	1	12
Max Alvis	62	115	21	.183	3	12
Mike Hershberger	49	98	23	.235	1	6
Bernie Smith	44	76	21	.276	1	6
Tito Francona	52	65	15	.231	0	4
Hank Allen	28	61	14	.230	0	4
John Kennedy	25	55	14	.255	2	6
Greg Goossen	21	47	12	.255	1	3
Floyd Wicker	15	41	8	.195	1	3
Rich Rollins	14	25	5	.200	0	5
Wayne Comer	13	17	1	.059	0	1
Sandy Valdespino	8	9	0	.000	0	0
Pete Koegel	7	8	2	.250	1	1
Fred Stanley	6	0	0	----	0	0

=== Pitching ===
==== Starting pitchers ====
Note: G = Games pitched; IP = Innings pitched; W = Wins; L = Losses; ERA = Earned run average; SO = Strikeouts

Player	G	IP	W	L	ERA	SO
Marty Pattin	37	233.1	14	12	3.39	161
Lew Krausse Jr.	37	216.1	13	18	4.75	130
Skip Lockwood	27	173.2	5	12	4.30	93
Gene Brabender	29	128.2	6	15	6.02	76
Al Downing	17	94.1	2	10	3.34	53
Ray Peters	2	2.0	0	2	31.50	1

==== Other pitchers ====
Note: G = Games pitched; IP = Innings pitched; W = Wins; L = Losses; ERA = Earned run average; SO = Strikeouts

Player	G	IP	W	L	ERA	SO
Bobby Bolin	32	132.0	5	11	4.91	81
John Morris	20	73.1	4	3	3.93	40
George Lauzerique	11	35.0	1	2	6.94	24

==== Relief pitchers ====
Note: G = Games pitched; W = Wins; L = Losses; SV = Saves; ERA = Earned run average; SO = Strikeouts

Player	G	W	L	SV	ERA	SO
Ken Sanders	50	5	2	13	1.75	64
John Gelnar	53	4	3	4	4.19	48
Dave Baldwin	28	2	1	1	2.55	26
Bob Locker	28	0	1	3	3.41	19
John O'Donoghue	25	2	0	0	5.01	13
Bob Humphreys	23	2	4	3	3.15	32
Dick Ellsworth	14	0	0	1	1.72	9
Bob Meyer	10	0	1	0	6.38	20
Wayne Twitchell	2	0	0	0	10.80	5
Bruce Brubaker	1	0	0	0	9.00	0

== Farm system ==
The Brewers' farm system consisted of four minor league affiliates in 1970. The Double-A Jacksonville Suns were shared with the Montreal Expos.

Level	Team	League	Manager
Triple-A	Portland Beavers	Pacific Coast League	Al Federoff
Double-A	Jacksonville Suns	Southern League	Gus Niarhos
Class A	Clinton Pilots	Midwest League	Earl Torgeson
Class A Short Season	Newark Co-Pilots	New York–Penn League	Sandy Johnson
