= 1968 Oakland Athletics season =

1968 Oakland Athletics
- League: American League
- Ballpark: Oakland-Alameda County Coliseum
- City: Oakland, California
- Record: 82–80 (.506)
- League place: 6th
- Owners: Charles O. Finley
- Managers: Bob Kennedy
- Television: KBHK-TV
- Radio: KNBR (Monte Moore, Al Helfer)

The 1968 Oakland Athletics season was the franchise's 68th season and its first in Oakland, California. The team finished sixth in the American League with a record of 82 wins and 80 losses, placing them 21 games behind the eventual World Series champion Detroit Tigers. The Athletics' paid attendance for the season was 837,466.

The 1968 season represented a tremendous breakthrough for the Athletics organization. The campaign resulted in their first winning record since 1952, when they were still located in Philadelphia. Moreover, the Athletics' 82 wins marked a 20-win increase over the prior year's 62–99 mark. The team's young core of Jim "Catfish" Hunter, Joe Rudi, Bert Campaneris, Reggie Jackson, Sal Bando, Gene Tenace, and Rick Monday began to gel; all of these young players (with the exception of Monday, who would be traded in 1971 for pitcher Ken Holtzman) would power the Athletics' forthcoming 1970s dynasty in which they would win three consecutive World Series championships. The franchise would play in Oakland for 57 seasons until 2024 when the team would temporarily relocate to West Sacramento for the 2025 season pending a permanent move to Las Vegas by 2028.

== Offseason ==
=== Relocation to Oakland ===
- On October 18, 1967, American League owners at last gave Charles O. Finley permission to move the Athletics from Kansas City, Missouri to Oakland for the 1968 season. According to some reports, AL President Joe Cronin promised Finley that he could move the team after the 1967 season as an incentive to sign the new lease with Municipal Stadium in Kansas City. The move came in spite of approval by voters in Jackson County, Missouri of a bond issue for a brand new baseball stadium (the eventual Kauffman Stadium) to be completed in 1973. During their 13-year stay in Kansas City, the Athletics were arguably one of the worst teams in baseball history, finishing last or next-to-last place in 10 of those years. Their overall record was 829–1,224, for a winning percentage of .404.
- October 22, 1967: Charlie Finley arrived at the Oakland Airport and was greeted by 400 fans. Finley had signed a 20-year lease ($125,000 per year or 5% of gate revenues if attendance passed 1.45 million a season) to bring the A's to Oakland.

=== Front office ===
Finley had persuaded Joe DiMaggio to take a position as Executive Vice President and consultant. DiMaggio needed two more years of baseball service to qualify for the league's maximum pension allowance. In addition, Finley signed Phil Seghi to run the A's farm system (of note, Seghi signed Pete Rose to his first major league contract).

=== Notable transactions ===
- October 19, 1967: Andy Kosco was purchased by the Athletics from the Minnesota Twins.
- January 27, 1968: 1968 Major League Baseball draft (January Draft) notable picks:

Round 1: George Hendrick
Round 2: Reggie Sanders

Secondary Phase:

Round 2: Ray Peters (did not sign)

== Regular season ==
=== Opening day ===
The first game in Oakland A's history took place on the road, on April 10, 1968, against the Baltimore Orioles at Memorial Stadium. The Orioles defeated the Athletics, 3–1, behind starting pitcher Tom Phoebus and the efforts of three relievers. Jim "Catfish" Hunter started for Oakland and took the loss, with Reggie Jackson hitting the first home run in Oakland's MLB history to account for the A's only run, the blow coming in the eighth inning. Seven days later, the Athletics made their home debut, also against the Orioles, and were again defeated, this time by a 4–1 score with Dave McNally besting Lew Krausse Jr. before 50,164 at Oakland–Alameda County Coliseum.

==== Starting lineup, April 10, 1968 ====
19	Bert Campaneris	SS
9	Reggie Jackson	RF
6	Sal Bando	3B
31	Ramón Webster	1B
12	John Donaldson	2B
17	Jim Pagliaroni	C
21	Jim Gosger	LF
7	Rick Monday	CF
27	Catfish Hunter	P

=== Hunter's perfect game ===
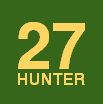
Catfish Hunter's number 27 was retired by the Oakland Athletics in 1991.

On May 8 against the Minnesota Twins, Hunter pitched the first regular season perfect game in the American League since 1922, but the paid attendance in Oakland was only 6,298 on a Wednesday night. The game was scoreless until the bottom of the seventh when Hunter squeezed the first run in. In the eighth, he drove in two more with a bases-loaded single, and ended with three hits and three RBI. Hunter was inducted in the National Baseball Hall of Fame in 1987 and was the first to have his number retired by the franchise, in 1991.

=== Season standings ===
American League
Team	W	L	Pct.	GB	Home	Road
Detroit Tigers	103	59	.636	—	56‍–‍25	47‍–‍34
Baltimore Orioles	91	71	.562	12	47‍–‍33	44‍–‍38
Cleveland Indians	86	75	.534	16½	43‍–‍37	43‍–‍38
Boston Red Sox	86	76	.531	17	46‍–‍35	40‍–‍41
New York Yankees	83	79	.512	20	39‍–‍42	44‍–‍37
Oakland Athletics	82	80	.506	21	44‍–‍38	38‍–‍42
Minnesota Twins	79	83	.488	24	41‍–‍40	38‍–‍43
California Angels	67	95	.414	36	32‍–‍49	35‍–‍46
Chicago White Sox	67	95	.414	36	36‍–‍45	31‍–‍50
Washington Senators	65	96	.404	37½	34‍–‍47	31‍–‍49

=== Record vs. opponents ===
1968 American League record Sources:
Team	BAL	BOS	CAL	CWS	CLE	DET	MIN	NYY	OAK	WAS
Baltimore	—	9–9	10–8	11–7	7–11	8–10	10–8	13–5	9–9	14–4
Boston	9–9	—	9–9	14–4	10–8	6–12	9–9	10–8	8–10	11–7
California	8–10	9–9	—	8–10	7–11	5–13	7–11	6–12	5–13	12–6
Chicago	7–11	4–14	10–8	—	5–13	5–13	10–8	6–12	10–8	10–8
Cleveland	11–7	8–10	11–7	13–5	—	6–12	14–4	10–8–1	6–12	7–10
Detroit	10–8	12–6	13–5	13–5	12–6	—	10–8	10–8–1	13–5–1	10–8
Minnesota	8–10	9–9	11–7	8–10	4–14	8–10	—	12–6	8–10	11–7
New York	5–13	8–10	12–6	12–6	8–10–1	8–10–1	6–12	—	10–8	14–4
Oakland	9–9	10–8	13–5	8–10	12–6	5–13–1	10–8	8–10	—	7–11
Washington	4–14	7–11	6–12	8–10	10–7	8–10	7–11	4–14	11–7	—

=== Notable transactions ===
- June 7, 1968: 1968 Major League Baseball draft (June Draft) notable picks:

Round 1: Pete Broberg (did not sign)
Round 6: Rich Troedson (did not sign).
Round 26: John Strohmayer

=== Roster ===
1968 Oakland Athletics
Roster
Pitchers: 23 Jack Aker; 11 Warren Bogle; 29 Chuck Dobson; 32 Rollie Fingers; 27 Catfish Hunter; 20 Lew Krausse Jr.; 28 George Lauzerique; 25 Paul Lindblad; 30 Jim Nash; 13,10,13 Blue Moon Odom; 32 Tony Pierce; 32 Ken Sanders; 24 Diego Seguí; 22 Ed Sprague	Catchers: 10 Dave Duncan; 18 Rene Lachemann; 17 Jim Pagliaroni; 4 Phil Roof; Infielders: 6 Sal Bando; 19 Bert Campaneris; 2 Danny Cater; 12 John Donaldson; 1 Dick Green; 14 Ted Kubiak; 31 Ray Webster	Outfielders: 21 Jim Gosger; 3 Mike Hershberger; 9 Reggie Jackson; 16 Joe Keough; 15 Allan Lewis; 7 Rick Monday; 15 Floyd Robinson; 8 Joe Rudi; Other batters: 10 Tony La Russa	Manager: 33 Bob Kennedy; Coaches: 5 Joe DiMaggio (Hitting/First base); 42 Sherm Lollar (Bullpen); 41 John McNamara (Third base); 40 Bill Posedel (Pitching)

== Player stats ==
=== Batting ===
==== Starters by position ====
Note: Pos = Position; G = Games played; AB = At bats; H = Hits; Avg. = Batting average; HR = Home runs; RBI = Runs batted in

Pos	Player	G	AB	H	Avg.	HR	RBI
C	Dave Duncan	82	246	47	.191	7	28
1B	Danny Cater	147	504	146	.290	6	62
2B	John Donaldson	127	363	80	.220	2	27
SS	Bert Campaneris	159	642	177	.276	4	38
3B	Sal Bando	162	605	152	.251	9	67
LF	Joe Rudi	68	181	32	.177	1	12
CF	Rick Monday	148	482	132	.274	8	49
RF	Reggie Jackson	154	553	138	.250	29	74

==== Other batters ====
Note: G = Games played; AB = At bats; H = Hits; Avg. = Batting average; HR = Home runs; RBI = Runs batted in

Player	G	AB	H	Avg.	HR	RBI
Mike Hershberger	99	246	67	.272	5	32
Dick Green	76	202	47	.233	6	18
Jim Pagliaroni	66	199	49	.246	6	20
Ray Webster	66	196	42	.214	3	23
Jim Gosger	88	150	27	.180	0	5
Ted Kubiak	48	120	30	.250	0	8
Joe Keough	34	98	21	.214	2	18
Floyd Robinson	53	81	20	.247	1	14
Phil Roof	34	64	12	.188	1	2
Rene Lachemann	19	60	9	.150	0	4
Allan Lewis	26	4	1	.250	0	0
Tony La Russa	5	3	1	.333	0	0

=== Pitching ===
==== Starting pitchers ====
Note: G = Games pitched; IP = Innings pitched; W = Wins; L = Losses; ERA = Earned run average; SO = Strikeouts

Player	G	IP	W	L	ERA	SO
Catfish Hunter	36	234.0	13	13	3.35	172
Blue Moon Odom	32	231.1	16	10	2.45	143
Jim Nash	34	228.2	13	13	2.28	169
Chuck Dobson	35	225.1	12	14	3.00	168
Lew Krausse Jr.	36	185.0	10	11	3.11	105

==== Other pitchers ====
Note: G = Games pitched; IP = Innings pitched; W = Wins; L = Losses; ERA = Earned run average; SO = Strikeouts

Player	G	IP	W	L	ERA	SO
Tony Pierce	17	32.2	1	2	3.86	16

==== Relief pitchers ====
Note: G = Games pitched; W = Wins; L = Losses; SV = Saves; ERA = Earned run average; SO = Strikeouts

Player	G	W	L	SV	ERA	SO
Jack Aker	54	4	4	11	4.10	44
Diego Seguí	52	6	5	6	2.39	72
Ed Sprague	47	3	4	4	3.28	34
Paul Lindblad	47	4	3	2	2.40	42
Warren Bogle	16	0	0	0	4.30	26
Ken Sanders	7	0	1	0	3.38	6
Rollie Fingers	1	0	0	0	27.00	0
George Lauzerique	1	0	0	0	0.00	0

== Farm system ==
- Life Magazine had declared the A's to have the best minor league system in professional baseball. Finley had spent $2.5 million on bonus contracts as a way of getting prospects to sign with his club.

Level	Team	League	Manager
AAA	Vancouver Mounties	Pacific Coast League	Mickey Vernon
AA	Birmingham A's	Southern League	Gus Niarhos
A	Peninsula Grays	Carolina League	Jimmy Williams
A	Leesburg Athletics	Florida State League	Al Ronning
A	Burlington Bees	Midwest League	Jim Hughes
Rookie	GCL A's	Gulf Coast League	Billy Herman

LEAGUE CHAMPIONS: GCL A's
