= Pete Koegel =

American baseball player (1947–2023)

- First baseman / Catcher / Outfielder
- Born: July 31, 1947; Mineola, New York, U.S.
- Died: February 4, 2023 (aged 75); Kingston, New York, U.S.
- Batted: Right Threw: Right

MLB debut
- September 1, 1970, for the Milwaukee Brewers

Last MLB appearance
- October 2, 1972, for the Philadelphia Phillies

MLB statistics
- Batting average: .174
- Home runs: 1
- Runs batted in: 5
- Hits: 15
- Runs: 6
- Stats at Baseball Reference

Teams
- Milwaukee Brewers (1970–1971); Philadelphia Phillies (1971–1972)

Peter John Koegel (July 31, 1947 – February 4, 2023) was an American Major League Baseball (MLB) first baseman, catcher, and outfielder. Koegel was drafted in the fourth round of the 1965 Major League Baseball draft by the Kansas City Athletics out of Seaford High School (New York). He remained in the organization through its move to Oakland, California before being traded along with Bob Meyer to the Seattle Pilots for Fred Talbot in 1969. Koegel again remained in an organization through a move, this time when the Pilots moved to Milwaukee, Wisconsin to become the Milwaukee Brewers. During his time with the Brewers, Koegel played at the Major League level with the team in 1970 and in 1971 before being dealt along with Ray Peters to the Philadelphia Phillies for Johnny Briggs on April 22, 1971. Koegel played at the Major League level with the Phillies that year, as well as the following year. In 1973, he was traded to the Pittsburgh Pirates for Chris Zachary, but never played a Major League game with the organization.

Koegel died in Kingston, New York, on February 4, 2023, at the age of 75.
