= Ossie Chavarría =

Panamanian baseball player (born 1937)

- Infielder / Outfielder
- Born: August 5, 1937 (age 89); Colón, Panama
- Batted: Right Threw: Right

MLB debut
- April 14, 1966, for the Kansas City Athletics

Last MLB appearance
- August 2, 1967, for the Kansas City Athletics

MLB statistics
- Home runs: 2
- Batting average: .208
- Runs batted in: 14
- Stats at Baseball Reference

Teams
- Kansas City Athletics (1966–1967)
Medals
Men's baseball
Representing Panama
Central American and Caribbean Games
Bronze medal – third place	1959 Caracas	Team

Osvaldo Chavarría Quijano (born August 5, 1937) is a Panamanian former Major League Baseball player. When he made his major league debut with the Kansas City Athletics on April 14, 1966, he became the thirteenth Panamanian born baseball player to make it to the majors.

== Career ==
Chavarría lied about his age, claiming to have been born in 1940 when he originally signed as an amateur free agent with the Chicago Cubs in 1959. After one season with the Cubs organization, he was acquired by the A's in a minor league transaction prior to the 1960 season.

He made his major league debut in left field against the Minnesota Twins at Metropolitan Stadium on April 14, 1966, and was held hitless by Jim Kaat in four at-bats. He hit his first major league home run in his 60th at bat on July 1 off the Detroit Tigers' Johnny Podres.

Chavarría struggled mightily in his second season with the A's. His batting average never climbed above .143, and he was to the triple A Vancouver Mounties August 4 to make room on the roster for Blue Moon Odom's return to the majors from a minor league assignment with a slash line of .102/.209/.136, four RBIs and no home runs. Over his two major league seasons, Chavarría also played first, second, third base and shortstop.

Chavarría was still with the Athletics organization when they moved to Oakland, California prior to the start of the 1968 season. He was traded to the New York Yankees with Danny Cater for Al Downing and Frank Fernández prior to the start of the 1970 season. After two seasons with the Yankees' International League affiliate, the Syracuse Chiefs, Chavarría was dealt to Mexico City Tigers of the Mexican Baseball League for Celerino Sánchez.

After retiring as a player, Chavarría became an umpire. He worked in the minor leagues, including the Northwest League, and college games. He has also umpired numerous international events, including the 1992 Olympics, the Baseball World Cup, Pan American Games and Intercontinental Cup.
