= Jim Ellis (baseball) =

American baseball player (born 1945)

- Pitcher
- Born: March 25, 1945 (age 81); Tulare, California, U.S.
- Batted: Right Threw: Left

MLB debut
- August 11, 1967, for the Chicago Cubs

Last MLB appearance
- July 12, 1969, for the St. Louis Cardinals

MLB statistics
- Win–loss record: 1–1
- Earned run average: 2.86
- Strikeouts: 8
- Stats at Baseball Reference

Teams
- Chicago Cubs (1967); St. Louis Cardinals (1969)

James Russell Ellis (born March 25, 1945) is an American former Major League Baseball pitcher who played in 1967 and 1969 for the Chicago Cubs and St. Louis Cardinals.

The 6 ft 2 in (1.88 m), 185 pounds (84 kg) Ellis was originally signed by the Cubs as a free-agent in 1963, and he made his big league debut with them on August 11, 1967, at the age of 22. Although he allowed one run, three hits and two walks in the 2 2/3 innings he pitched in his big league debut earning the loss, his first big league at-bat was notable because he hit a double off an opposing pitcher Jim Bunning, driving in the Cubs only run of the game. Overall, Ellis went 1–1 with a 3.24 ERA in eight games (one started) in his first big league season.

On April 23, 1968, Ellis was traded with Ted Savage to the Los Angeles Dodgers for Jim Hickman and Phil Regan. On October 21 of that year, he was traded to the Cardinals for Pete Mikkelsen. He appeared in two games for the Cardinals in 1969, starting one of them. In 5 1/3 innings, he allowed only one run for a 1.69 ERA.

Ellis played his final big league game on July 12, 1969. Overall, he went 1–1 with a 2.86 ERA in 10 major league games.

He was involved in a trade with the Milwaukee Brewers on October 20, 1970. The Cardinals sent Ellis and Carl Taylor to the Brewers for Jerry McNertney, George Lauzerique and Jesse Huggins, a minor leaguer. After one season with the Brewers' top farm club, the Evansville Triplets, Ellis' professional career ended.
