= Al Downing =

American baseball player (born 1941)

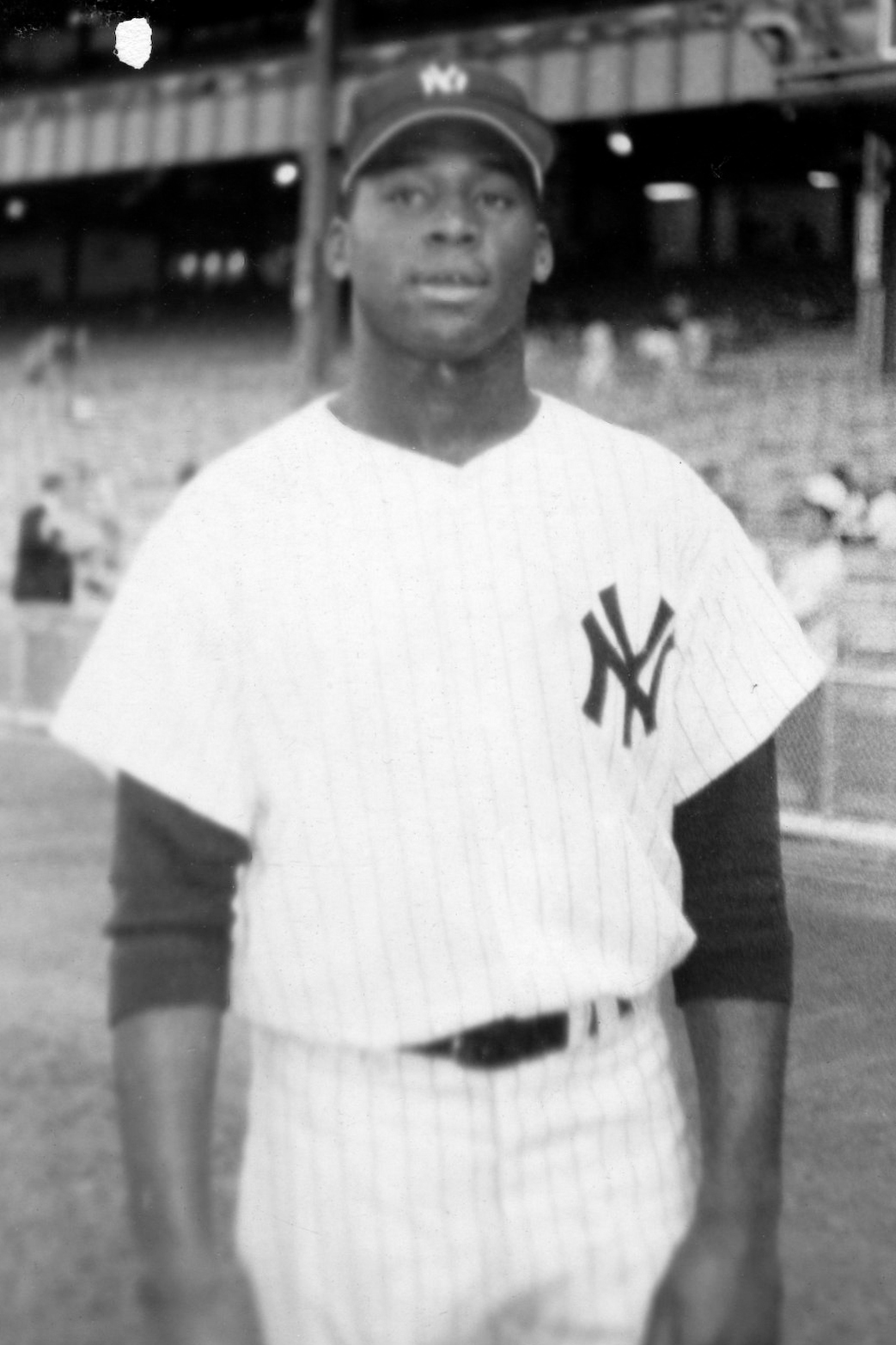
- Pitcher
- Born: June 28, 1941 (age 85); Trenton, New Jersey, U.S.
- Batted: Right Threw: Left

MLB debut
- July 19, 1961, for the New York Yankees

Last MLB appearance
- July 13, 1977, for the Los Angeles Dodgers

MLB statistics
- Win–loss record: 123–107
- Earned run average: 3.22
- Strikeouts: 1,639
- Stats at Baseball Reference

Teams
- New York Yankees (1961–1969); Oakland Athletics (1970); Milwaukee Brewers (1970); Los Angeles Dodgers (1971–1977)

Career highlights and awards
- All-Star (1967); World Series champion (1961); AL strikeout leader (1964)

Alphonso Erwin Downing (born June 28, 1941) is an American former professional baseball pitcher. He played in Major League Baseball for the New York Yankees, Oakland Athletics, Milwaukee Brewers, and Los Angeles Dodgers from 1961 through 1977. Downing was an All Star in 1967 and the National League's Comeback Player of the Year in 1971. Downing allowed Hank Aaron's record breaking 715th home run on April 8, 1974.

== Early life ==
Downing was born in Trenton, New Jersey. He participated in the Police Athletic League. Downing attended Trenton Central High School, Muhlenberg College in Allentown, Pennsylvania, and Rider College in Lawrenceville, New Jersey. He also played baseball as a semi-professional.

== New York Yankees ==
Downing signed with the New York Yankees as an amateur free agent in 1961, and was promoted to the major league roster by July of that season. In 1963, his first full major league season, Downing had a 13–5 win–loss record with a 2.56 earned run average (ERA) for a Yankee team that went 104–57, but were swept by the Los Angeles Dodgers in the 1963 World Series. In 1964, he went 13–8 with a 3.47 ERA, and led the league with 217 strikeouts.

Downing was 9–5 with a 2.66 ERA when he made his only All-Star team in 1967. He pitched two innings, giving up no earned runs while striking out two. On August 11, 1967, Downing struck out all three batters on nine total pitches in the second inning of a game against the Cleveland Indians; it was the first immaculate inning in the major leagues since 1964.

Injuries limited Downing to only twelve starts in 1968. In 1969, Yankees manager Ralph Houk began using Downing out of the bullpen more, as he made fifteen starts and fifteen relief appearances. He was traded to the Oakland Athletics prior to the 1970 along with catcher Frank Fernández for Danny Cater and Ossie Chavarria.

== NL Comeback Player of the Year ==
Oakland traded Downing and Tito Francona to the Milwaukee Brewers on June 11, 1970, for Steve Hovley. Despite a respectable 3.34 ERA, Downing's record was 2–10 for a Brewers team that narrowly escaped losing 100 games (97). For the season, Downing went 5–13 with a 3.52 ERA and 79 strikeouts in 27 games and 22 starts between his two teams.

Prior to the start of the 1971 season, the Brewers traded Downing to the Los Angeles Dodgers for Andy Kosco. In his first season in the National League (NL), Downing won twenty games, and pitched a league-leading five shutouts. He earned NL Comeback Player of the Year honors as well as finishing third in NL Cy Young Award balloting behind Ferguson Jenkins and Tom Seaver.

On April 8, 1974, Downing allowed a home run to Hank Aaron that was the 715th of his career, breaking the all-time record set by Babe Ruth. Downing made his third, and final post-season appearance that season. His Dodgers lost four games to one to the Oakland A's. Downing played two more full seasons with the Dodgers, and was released during the 1977 season with a 0–1 record and 6.75 ERA.

== Broadcasting career ==
Downing served as a color analyst on Dodgers cable-TV broadcasts from 1980 to 1987 and on Dodgers radio in 2005. He also broadcast for CBS Radio in the 1990s, and the Atlanta Braves in 2000. As of 2006, he remains on the Dodgers Speaker's Bureau.

== See also ==
- Black Aces, African-American pitchers with a 20-win MLB season
- List of Major League Baseball annual strikeout leaders
- List of Major League Baseball pitchers who have thrown an immaculate inning
- List of World Series starting pitchers
- Los Angeles Dodgers award winners and league leaders
- New York Yankees award winners and league leaders
