= Frank Fernández (baseball) =

American baseball player (born 1943)

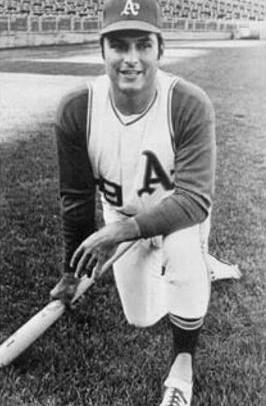
- Catcher
- Born: April 16, 1943 (age 83); Staten Island, New York, U.S.
- Batted: Right Threw: Right

MLB debut
- September 12, 1967, for the New York Yankees

Last MLB appearance
- May 25, 1972, for the Chicago Cubs

MLB statistics
- Batting average: .199
- Home runs: 39
- Runs batted in: 116
- Stats at Baseball Reference

Teams
- New York Yankees (1967–1969); Oakland Athletics (1970–1971); Washington Senators (1971); Chicago Cubs (1971–1972)

Frank Fernández (born April 16, 1943) is an American former professional baseball catcher. He played in Major League Baseball for the New York Yankees, Oakland Athletics, Washington Senators, and Chicago Cubs from 1967 to 1972.

== Biography ==
Fernández signed as an amateur free agent with the New York Yankees of Major League Baseball (MLB) upon graduation from Curtis High School in Staten Island in 1961. He spent six seasons in their minor league system before debuting with the Yankees as a September call-up in 1967. He went one for three in his major league debut against the California Angels in the second game of a doubleheader on September 12.

Fernández backed up Jake Gibbs for 1968 and 1969. Upon former first round draft pick Thurman Munson's arrival in the major leagues, the Yankees dealt Fernández to the Oakland Athletics with Al Downing for Danny Cater and Ossie Chavarria prior to the start of the 1970 season.

During the 1971 season, the A's traded Fernández to the Washington Senators with Paul Lindblad and Don Mincher for Mike Epstein and Darold Knowles. A little over a month later, he was purchased back by the Athletics. Late in the 1971 season, the Athletics traded Fernández and Bill McNulty to the Chicago Cubs for Adrian Garrett.

Fernández made three pinch hitting appearances with the Cubs in 1972, but spent most of his time with their triple A affiliate, the Wichita Aeros before being reacquired by the Yankees in a minor league deal. He also spent time in Oakland's and the Detroit Tigers' farm system before retiring.

Fernández once held the record for the most home runs (39) for a player with a batting average less than .200, as well as having the most career walks than hits by a non-pitcher with over 100 at-bats, with 164 walks and 145 hits.

Fernández was inducted into the Staten Island Sports Hall of Fame in 2000.
