= Ray Peters =

American baseball player (1946–2019)

- Pitcher
- Born: August 27, 1946; Buffalo, New York, U.S.
- Died: May 4, 2019 (aged 72); Dallas, Texas, U.S.
- Batted: Right Threw: Right

MLB debut
- June 4, 1970, for the Milwaukee Brewers

Last MLB appearance
- June 9, 1970, for the Milwaukee Brewers

MLB statistics
- Win–loss record: 0–2
- Earned run average: 31.50
- Strikeouts: 1
- Stats at Baseball Reference

Teams
- Milwaukee Brewers (1970)

Raymond James Peters (August 27, 1946 – May 4, 2019) was an American professional baseball player and a former Major League pitcher. Peters, a 6 ft 5 in (1.96 m), 210 lb (95 kg) right-hander born in Buffalo, New York, attended Harvard University, where he played college baseball for the Crimson for two seasons (1967–68).

== Career ==
He was drafted by the Seattle Pilots in the first round (22nd pick) of the 1969 amateur draft (secondary phase). He had been drafted four times previously, but did not sign with any of those clubs.

Said his Harvard baseball coach, Norman Shepard, in 1969: "A pitcher like Ray comes along just once in a while. He was one that could throw the ball by the hitter. You don't get a real stopper like Ray every day." Peters received his Bachelor of Arts in Latin American History and Spanish from Harvard in 1969. He was inducted into the Harvard Varsity Club Hall of Fame in 1993.

Peters' Major League career lasted about a week, starting two games for the Milwaukee Brewers (né Pilots) against the Cleveland Indians and Detroit Tigers in 1970 (June 4 and June 9). Peters gave up 12 baserunners (7 hits and 5 walks) and 7 earned runs in 2 total innings, and shortly thereafter returned to the minor leagues. He was traded along with Pete Koegel from the Brewers to the Philadelphia Phillies for Johnny Briggs on April 22, 1971.

Peters' career MLB totals included an 0–2 record, 1 strikeout, and an earned run average of 31.50. His minor league career lasted three seasons, from 1969–1971.

== Death ==
Peters died on May 4, 2019, aged 72, in Dallas, Texas.
