= Ray Oyler =

American baseball player (1937–1981)

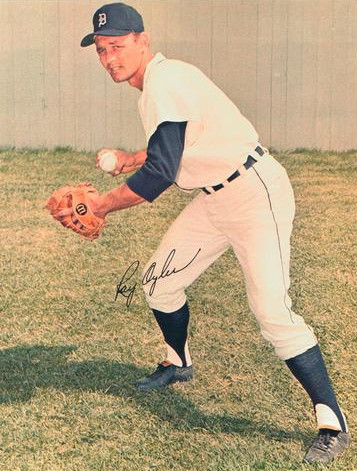
- Shortstop
- Born: August 4, 1937; Indianapolis, Indiana, U.S.
- Died: January 26, 1981 (aged 43); Redmond, Washington, U.S.
- Batted: Right Threw: Right

MLB debut
- April 18, 1965, for the Detroit Tigers

Last MLB appearance
- October 1, 1970, for the California Angels

MLB statistics
- Batting average: .175
- Home runs: 15
- Runs batted in: 86
- Stats at Baseball Reference

Teams
- Detroit Tigers (1965–1968); Seattle Pilots (1969); California Angels (1970)

Career highlights and awards
- World Series champion (1968)

Raymond Francis Oyler (August 4, 1937 – January 26, 1981) was an American baseball player, a major league shortstop for the Detroit Tigers (1965–1968), Seattle Pilots (1969), and California Angels (1970). He is best remembered as the slick-fielding, no-hit shortstop for the 1968 World Series champion Tigers and as the subject of the "Ray Oyler Fan Club" organized by Seattle radio personality Robert E. Lee Hardwick (of the Pilots flagship radio station KVI) in Seattle. Oyler is noteworthy for having had the lowest career batting average of any position player (with at least a thousand at-bats) in modern baseball history.

== Early years ==
Oyler was born in Indianapolis, Indiana, to Ray and Frances (née Harrington) Oyler. He graduated from Cathedral High School in Indianapolis in 1955 and served in the U.S. Marine Corps before playing in the major leagues.

== Detroit Tigers (1965–1968) ==
Oyler was signed by the Tigers in 1960 as an amateur free agent. He made his major league debut with Detroit on April 18, 1965, going 0-for-2 as the starting shortstop against the California Angels.

During his first two seasons, Oyler was a backup shortstop to Dick McAuliffe. In 1965, Oyler debuted with a .186 batting average, with five home runs, six doubles and 13 RBI in 82 games. In 1966, Oyler's average dropped to .171 in 71 games, with one home run and 9 RBI in 210 at bats.

In 1967, the Tigers moved McAuliffe from shortstop to second base, opening a spot for Oyler as the Tigers' starting shortstop. Oyler played a career-high 147 games at shortstop in 1967 and had career-highs with 185 putouts, 374 assists, and 61 double plays. Also, as an everyday player in 1967, Oyler increased his batting average to .207, the only year in which he hit above .200, along with a home run, two triples, 14 doubles and 29 RBI. Additionally, he was also third in the American League with 15 sacrifice hits in 1967.

In 1968, Oyler played in 111 games, with 29 hits (21 of them singles) for a career-low batting average of .135, which remains the lowest batting average by any major league player appearing in at least 100 games in a season. Defensively, his .977 fielding percentage was 15 points above the league average for shortstops.

== 1968 World Series: Mayo Smith's shortstop gamble ==
When Oyler went "0 for August", manager Mayo Smith moved outfielder Mickey Stanley to the shortstop position for the last nine games of the regular season and for all seven games of the 1968 World Series. Oyler's batting average had dropped to .135, and Smith had four quality outfielders in Willie Horton, Jim Northrup, Al Kaline, and Mickey Stanley that he wanted in the lineup for every World Series game. Stanley had not played the shortstop position before the 1968 season, but was a talented athlete with a good glove.

Oyler did not have an official at bat in the 1968 World Series, but he did appear in all four Detroit victories as a defensive replacement and had a sacrifice bunt.

In its "The End of the Century" series, ESPN rated Smith's decision to move Stanley to shortstop for the World Series as one of the 10 greatest coaching decisions of the century.

Stanley returned to play 59 games at shortstop the next year, while Oyler was allowed to be drafted by the expansion Seattle Pilots.

== The Ray Oyler "S.O.C. I.T. T.O. M.E. .300 Club" in Seattle (1969) ==
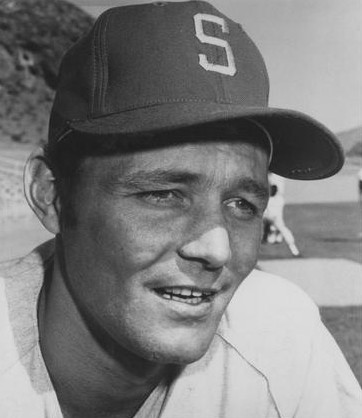
Oyler with the Seattle Pilots in 1969

Oyler was left unprotected in the expansion draft after the 1968 season and was the third player drafted by the Seattle Pilots. Before the Pilots even played their first game in 1969, Seattle radio disc jockey Robert E. Lee "Bob" Hardwick looked over the list of players drafted by the Pilots, discovered Oyler's batting average and created the "Ray Oyler Fan Club," initially as a radio bit on his radio show.

Grabbing onto the popularity of the late 1960s Laugh-In show's "Sock it to Me" catchphrase, the fan club was called the Ray Oyler "S.O.C. I.T. T.O. M.E. .300" Club, meaning "Slugger Oyler Can, In Time, Top Our Manager's Estimate" and hit .300. Some 15,000 baseball-starved fans signed up, and former Pilots relief pitcher Jack Aker recalled that the Ray Oyler Fan Club was out in great number at Sick's Stadium on the Pilots Opening Day. The fan club even gave Oyler a car and an apartment to use. When Oyler came to bat for the first time on Opening Day, the Oyler Fan Club went wild. "He got cheers, horns blew, confetti filled the air in his first time at bat."

In April 1969, catcher Jim Campanis of the Kansas City Royals punched Oyler during a game. The Ray Oyler Fan Club sent a telegram to Royals general manager Cedric Tallis, protesting Campanis' actions and saying: "Please do not misinterpret our motto 'Sock it to Ray Oyler', as this is an expression of encouragement." The Oyler Fan Club also developed and sang songs, such as "Hey Ray Oyler yer Bat's Too Small." Former fan club members still boast that Oyler holds the all-time Pilots records for assists, putouts, and home runs by a shortstop (the Pilots played only one year, and Oyler was their shortstop).

In Ball Four, Seattle teammate Jim Bouton wrote that Oyler's nickname was "Oil Can Harry" because "he always looks as though he had just changed a set of rings."

Oyler hit a career-high seven home runs with 22 RBI in 106 games for the Pilots in 1969, and increased his batting average to .165.

== Later years ==
In December 1969, Oyler was traded to the Oakland Athletics with pitcher Diego Segui for infielder Ted Kubiak and pitcher George Lauzerique. Oyler was sold by Oakland in April 1970 and played his final 24 games with the California Angels, with a perfect fielding percentage and a .083 average at the plate. In a six-year career, he finished with a .175 batting average (221-for-1,265). After his major league career ended, Oyler was a player-coach for the Honolulu and Salt Lake City teams of the Pacific Coast League before retiring in 1973.

After Oyler retired from baseball, he settled in the Seattle area, working for the Safeway supermarket chain, managing a bowling alley in Bellevue, Washington, and working at Boeing. Oyler played slowpitch softball in Seattle from 1973 to 1980 and also occasionally pitched batting practice for the Tigers when they were in Seattle playing the Mariners. He suffered a heart attack on January 26, 1981, and died at the age of 43. He is buried at Sunset Hills Memorial Park in Bellevue.
