= Ron Clark (baseball) =

American baseball player (born 1943)

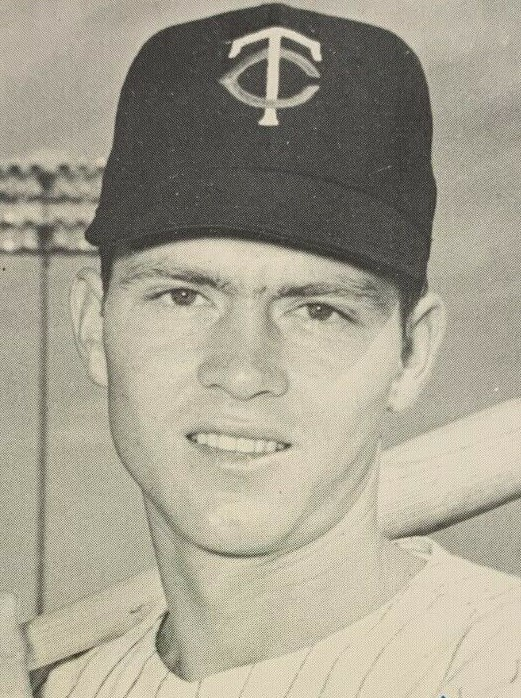
- Infielder
- Born: January 14, 1943 (age 83); Fort Worth, Texas, U.S.
- Batted: Right Threw: Right

MLB debut
- September 11, 1966, for the Minnesota Twins

Last MLB appearance
- September 26, 1975, for the Philadelphia Phillies

MLB statistics
- Batting average: .189
- Home runs: 5
- Runs batted in: 43
- Stats at Baseball Reference

Teams
- Minnesota Twins (1966–1969); Seattle Pilots (1969); Oakland Athletics (1971–1972); Milwaukee Brewers (1972); Philadelphia Phillies (1975)

Ronald Bruce Clark (born January 14, 1943) is an American former professional baseball infielder who played in Major League Baseball (MLB) for the Minnesota Twins (1966–1969), Seattle Pilots (1969), Oakland Athletics (1971–1972), Milwaukee Brewers (1972), and Philadelphia Phillies (1975). During a seven-year big league career, Clark batted .189, with five home runs, and 43 runs batted in (RBI). Clark was later a minor league manager and was an MLB coach for the Chicago White Sox (1988–1990), Seattle Mariners (1991), and Cleveland Indians (1992–1993). He later worked as a scout for the Kansas City Royals before retiring from baseball in 2014.

== Playing career ==
Clark graduated from Brewer High School in Fort Worth, Texas. Before the 1961 season, he signed with the Phillies as an amateur free agent (prior to the MLB draft). He was acquired by the Los Angeles Angels prior to the 1962 season, then by the Twins before the 1963 season. He made his MLB debut in September 1966. In the minors in 1967, Clark led the Pacific Coast League with 94 RBI and won a minor league Gold Glove Award for his defense at third base. He played in a career-high 104 MLB games for Minnesota in 1968.

Clark was part of several teams that reached the postseason. In the first half of 1969, he played for the Twins, which won the American League (AL) West division. He also contributed to the Athletics’ successes in winning the AL West in 1971, then played for the team at the start of their 1972 World Series-winning season. He never played in a postseason game.

The expansion Pilots purchased Clark's contract in July 1969. He collided with George Scott of the Boston Red Sox during a game, needing 13 stitches. In January 1970, the team, then relocated to Milwaukee, traded Clark with Don Mincher to Oakland for Mike Hershberger, Lew Krausse, Phil Roof, and Ken Sanders. In June 1972, the Athletics traded Clark back to the Brewers for Bill Voss. After playing in 22 games for the Brewers, Clark was traded back to the Angels with Paul Ratliff for Joe Azcue and Syd O'Brien. Clark did not play in the majors for the Angels and was traded to the San Diego Padres for Aurelio Monteagudo in June 1973. San Diego sent him to Philadelphia for minor leaguer Gene Martin that December. Clark played in one MLB game for the Phillies, on September 26, 1975, his last game in the majors and first since 1972. He struck out in his only at bat, which was also his only at bat in the National League. He stayed in the Phillies organization long enough to qualify for a full player's pension.

== Coaching career ==
After retiring as a player, Clark worked in the Phillies organization as a minor league coach and manager. He began coaching in 1976 with the Oklahoma City 89ers in 1976, then first managed in 1978 with the Spartanburg Phillies of the Western Carolinas League, then managed the Peninsula Pilots, Reading Phillies, Oklahoma City, and Clearwater Phillies. He briefly left the organization to manage the Kinston Blue Jays in 1983, leaving the Toronto Blue Jays system after one year to return to the Phillies, where he managed through 1986.

Clark joined the White Sox organization in 1987. He became an MLB coach for the first time in 1988, working as the team's third base coach. He was the first base coach in 1990. He then was the bench coach for Seattle in 1991 and had three same role for Cleveland in 1992 and 1993.

Clark later worked off the field for the Kansas City Royals organization in several roles, including as a scout, retiring from baseball in 2014.
