= Steve Hovley =

American baseball player

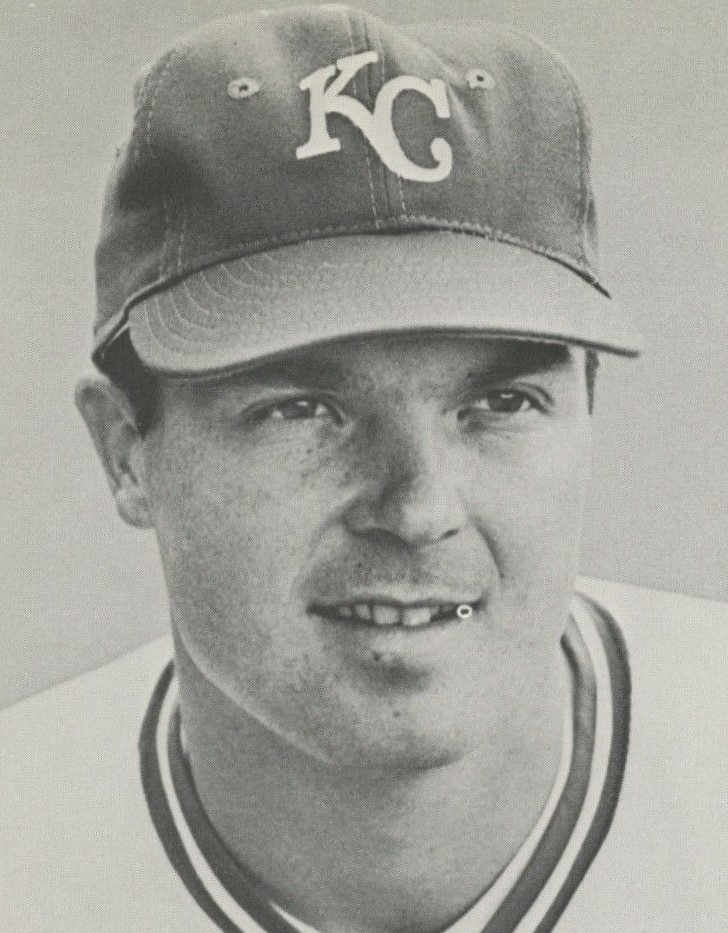
- Outfielder
- Born: December 18, 1944 (age 81); Ventura, California, U.S.
- Batted: Left Threw: Left

MLB debut
- June 26, 1969, for the Seattle Pilots

Last MLB appearance
- September 28, 1973, for the Kansas City Royals

MLB statistics
- Batting average: .258
- Home runs: 8
- Runs batted in: 88
- Stats at Baseball Reference

Teams
- Seattle Pilots / Milwaukee Brewers (1969–1970); Oakland Athletics (1970–1971); Kansas City Royals (1972–1973)

Stephen Eugene Hovley (born December 18, 1944), nicknamed Tennis Ball Head, is an American former professional baseball player whose career extended for eight seasons, including all or parts of five years in Major League Baseball for the Seattle Pilots / Milwaukee Brewers (1969–70), Oakland Athletics (1970–71) and Kansas City Royals (1972–73). An outfielder, he threw and batted left-handed, stood 5 feet 10 inches (1.78 m) tall and weighed 188 pounds (85 kg).

Born in Ventura, California, Hovley attended Stanford University and was selected by the California Angels in the 35th round (665th overall) of the 1966 Major League Baseball draft. After two seasons in the Angels' farm system, he was chosen by the Pilots in the 1968 Major League Baseball expansion draft—also with the 35th pick. The Pilots lent Hovley to the Triple-A Rochester Red Wings for the first two months of their inaugural 1969 season before recalling him in June. In his third big-league game, Hovley collected three hits against his former team, the Angels, on June 27. His hot start in the Majors continued for his first two-dozen games, as he reached a season-high .352 batting average on July 24, with ten multi-hit games. Hovley eventually cooled off and he ended the year with a .277 batting mark, three home runs and 20 RBI in 91 games played. He was a roommate of veteran pitcher Jim Bouton's, whose diary of the 1969 season, Ball Four, became a national sensation a year later. Hovley, like Bouton, was a non-conformist in the baseball world; according to Bouton, other players nicknamed Hovley "Orbie," shorthand for "Orbit" because his behavior was considered to be so “spacey.” Hovley said he actually liked the nickname.

The following season, in 1970, the Pilots moved to Wisconsin as the Brewers, and in their first home game at Milwaukee County Stadium on April 7, Hovley had three hits in three at bats off the Angels' Andy Messersmith; but the rest of the Brewers combined for just one hit in 28 at bats and the team fell, 12–0. Hovley got into 40 games and batted .281 with 16 RBI before being traded to Oakland on June 11 for Al Downing and Tito Francona. Relegated to part-time duty with the A's, Hovley hit only .173 in 141 at bats during his tenure, was sent to Triple-A in 1971, and then acquired by the Royals in the 1971 Rule 5 draft. He then played two years as the Royals' fourth outfielder, appearing in 105 and 104 games, to close out his Major League career with 263 hits (39 doubles, five triples and eight home runs), 88 RBI and a .258 batting average in 436 games played.
