= Bob Johnson (infielder) =

American baseball player (1936–2019)

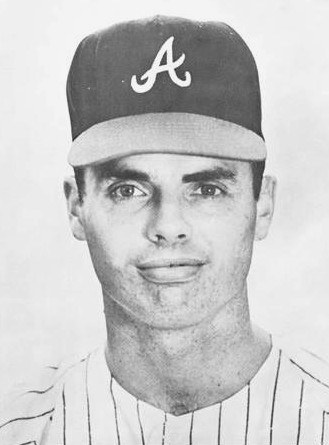
- Utility player
- Born: March 4, 1936; Omaha, Nebraska, U.S.
- Died: November 12, 2019 (aged 83); St. Paul, Minnesota, U.S.
- Batted: Right Threw: Right

MLB debut
- April 19, 1960, for the Kansas City Athletics

Last MLB appearance
- June 20, 1970, for the Oakland Athletics

MLB statistics
- Batting average: .272
- Home runs: 44
- Runs batted in: 230
- Stats at Baseball Reference

Teams
- Kansas City Athletics (1960); Washington Senators (1961–1962); Baltimore Orioles (1963–1967); New York Mets (1967); Cincinnati Reds (1968); Atlanta Braves (1968); St. Louis Cardinals (1969); Oakland Athletics (1969–1970)

Career highlights and awards
- World Series champion (1966)

Robert Wallace Johnson (March 4, 1936 – November 12, 2019), nicknamed "Rocky", was an American professional baseball player. Largely a utility infielder and pinch hitter, Johnson appeared in 11 Major League Baseball seasons, from 1960 through 1970, for seven clubs, including the 1966 World Series champion Baltimore Orioles. He threw and batted right-handed, stood 5 ft 10 in (1.78 m) tall, and weighed 175 lb (79 kg).

== Playing career ==
Johnson's 11-season MLB career began with the Kansas City Athletics and ended with the same franchise, when it was based in Oakland. He was a member of the expansion Washington Senators during their maiden season in the American League, then moved on to the Orioles, where he would play four full seasons and establish himself as a top pinch hitter. In 1964 he led the American League with 45 pinch hit at bats and 15 pinch hits. Three years later, in 1967, Johnson collected 13 pinch hits in 34 at-bats in a season split between the Orioles and the National League's New York Mets.

Although Johnson's career batting average was only .272, he twice hit over .340 as a part-time player, for the 1967 Mets (.348) and the 1969 Athletics (.343). During the latter season, Johnson made 14 pinch hits in 50 at bats, in a season divided between Oakland and the St. Louis Cardinals.

In the field, Johnson played every infield position: shortstop (201 games), second base (167), third base (166) and first base (107). He collected 66 pinch hits in 243 career at bats — to match his career overall batting average of .272.

Johnson died on November 12, 2019, at age 83.
