= Allan Lewis (baseball) =

Panamanian baseball player (born 1941)

- Outfielder / Pinch runner
- Born: December 12, 1941 (age 84); Colón, Panama
- Batted: Both Threw: Right

MLB debut
- April 11, 1967, for the Kansas City Athletics

Last MLB appearance
- September 30, 1973, for the Oakland Athletics

MLB statistics
- Batting average: .207
- Home runs: 1
- Stolen bases: 44
- Stats at Baseball Reference

Teams
- Kansas City/Oakland Athletics (1967–1973)

Career highlights and awards
- 2× World Series champion (1972–1973)

Allan Sydney Lewis (born December 12, 1941) is a Panamanian former professional baseball player and coach. He played in Major League Baseball (MLB) as an outfielder and pinch runner over parts of six seasons between 1967 and 1973 with the Kansas City/Oakland Athletics. Lewis won World Series championships while playing for the Athletics in 1972 and 1973. He holds the record for most pinch running appearances in a single World Series with 6 in 1972. Lewis is one of only seven players with more career game appearances than plate appearances. He was dubbed "The Panamanian Express" for his base-stealing ability and his country of origin, in contrast to the train run called the Panama Limited.

As a minor leaguer with the Leesburg Athletics in 1966, Lewis set a minor league single-season record with 116 steals, which stood until 1980, when Alan Wiggins stole 120.

He made his Major League debut in 1967 despite never having played above the Class A in the minor leagues because Athletics' owner Charlie Finley was intrigued by Lewis' speed and wanted to add a pinch runner to the roster. Athletics' manager wanted a more versatile player but was forced to keep Lewis on the initial roster because Finley had already publicized Lewis' role. Lewis was demoted to the minor leagues in June of that season when the team needed to add an extra pitcher to the roster, despite Lewis having stolen 14 bases in 19 attempts.

From 1968 through 1970, Lewis continued to bounce between the Athletics and the minor leagues. Lewis hit the only home run of his career on September 27, 1970 off of Greg Garrett, in a game he started in left field. Lewis broke his ankle during 1971 spring training and once healthy spent the remainder of the season for the minor league Birmingham A's without playing in the Major Leagues at all that season.

Lewis split the 1972 season between Birmingham and Oakland. He was not originally on the A's playoff roster but was added to the World Series roster after Reggie Jackson was injured. In the first 2 games of the series he was caught stealing by Reds' catcher Johnny Bench after pinch running for Mike Epstein. Lewis ended up being used as a pinch runner in 6 of the 7 games of the series, scoring 2 runs to help the A's to their championship. The 6 pinch running appearances set a World Series record.

In 1973, Lewis again split the season between Birmingham and Oakland. The A's again won the World Series, and Lewis played in 2 games of the American League Championship Series and 3 games of the World Series, scoring 1 run in each. Before the 1974 season, the A's signed Herb Washington as a pinch runner and Lewis was demoted to the Tucson Toros but never played in the Major Leagues or minor leagues again. For his career he batted .207 with 1 home run and 44 stolen bases in 156 games.

After retiring, Lewis served as a minor league instructors for several years. He later served as a scout for both the Cleveland Indians and Philadelphia Phillies. Among the players he signed as a scout were Einar Díaz for Cleveland and Carlos Ruiz for Philadelphia. In 2009, he served as a coach for the Panamanian team in the World Baseball Classic.
