= Jim Roland =

American baseball player (1942–2010)

- Pitcher
- Born: December 14, 1942; Franklin, North Carolina, U.S.
- Died: March 6, 2010 (aged 67); Shelby, North Carolina, U.S.
- Batted: Right Threw: Left

MLB debut
- September 20, 1962, for the Minnesota Twins

Last MLB appearance
- September 16, 1972, for the Texas Rangers

MLB statistics
- Win–loss record: 19–17
- Earned run average: 3.22
- Strikeouts: 272
- Stats at Baseball Reference

Teams
- Minnesota Twins (1962–1968); Oakland Athletics (1969–1972); New York Yankees (1972); Texas Rangers (1972)

James Ivan Roland (December 14, 1942 – March 6, 2010) was an American professional baseball relief pitcher. He played in Major League Baseball (MLB) for the Minnesota Twins, Oakland Athletics, New York Yankees, and Texas Rangers.

Roland entered the majors in 1962 with the Minnesota Twins, playing for them six years (1962–64, 1966–68), before joining the Oakland Athletics (1969–72), New York Yankees (1972) and Texas Rangers (1972). A starter converted to long relief duties, he possessed a hard fastball and a dominant curve, but his delivery was bothered by control problems for most of his career. His most productive season came in 1969, when he posted career-numbers in wins (five), earned run average (2.19), games (39) and innings pitched (86 1/3). After that his career declined due to a nerve problem in his throwing arm, pitching a combined 23 innings for Oakland, New York and Texas in 1972, his last major league season.

His only career shutout was at the expense of the Chicago White Sox, 3–0, at Comiskey Park on April 21, 1963. He gave up three singles on nine walks and seven strikeouts. On May 19, 1964, he defeated the New York Yankees at Yankee Stadium, 7–2, pitching 12 innings and facing 50 batters, in a victory where he went up against a lineup which included Roger Maris, Mickey Mantle, Elston Howard, Tom Tresh and Bobby Richardson.

In a 10-year career, Roland went 19–17 with a 3.22 ERA and nine saves in 216 pitching appearances, including 29 starts, six complete games and one shutout, giving up 185 runs (161 earned) on 357 hits, while striking out 272 and walking 229 in 450 1/3 innings of work. In four minor league seasons, he had a 32–42 record with a 3.48 ERA in 111 games.

Roland died from cancer in Shelby, North Carolina, at the age of 67.
