= John Donaldson (second baseman) =

American baseball player (born 1943)

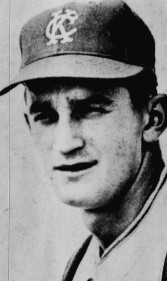
- Second baseman
- Born: May 5, 1943 (age 82); Charlotte, North Carolina, U.S.
- Batted: Left Threw: Right

MLB debut
- August 26, 1966, for the Kansas City Athletics

Last MLB appearance
- October 2, 1974, for the Oakland Athletics

MLB statistics
- Batting average: .238
- Home runs: 4
- Runs batted in: 86
- Stats at Baseball Reference

Teams
- Kansas City / Oakland Athletics (1966–1969); Seattle Pilots (1969); Oakland Athletics (1970, 1974)

John David Donaldson (born May 5, 1943) is an American former professional baseball infielder who appeared in 405 games over all or part of six seasons in Major League Baseball, almost exclusively as a second baseman, for two American League franchises, the Kansas City / Oakland Athletics (1966–1969, 1970 and 1974) and Seattle Pilots (1969). Donaldson batted left-handed, threw right-handed, and was listed as 5 feet 11 inches (1.80 m) tall and 160 pounds (73 kg).

He was born in Charlotte, North Carolina, where he graduated from Garinger High School and played semi-pro baseball for local cotton mills. The Minnesota Twins signed him in 1963 on the recommendations of the general manager of the Double-A Charlotte Hornets, and Twins' special-assignment scout Billy Martin. After only one year in the low minor leagues, Donaldson was selected by the Athletics in the first-year player draft then in effect. He spent three years rising through the Athletics' farm system when he was called up to Kansas City in August 1966 for his first MLB audition. Sent back to Triple-A Vancouver for 1967, he batted .339 through early June and was recalled by the Athletics. With regular Dick Green battling injuries and a season-long batting slump, Donaldson took over as second baseman, starting 100 games, and hitting .276 with 104 hits and 28 RBI, all career bests.

At season's end, the Athletics relocated to Oakland, and Donaldson held onto his starting job through the 1968 campaign's early weeks. He played in the Oakland Athletics' maiden road and home games in April. But a lingering stomach ailment impacted his performance, and by early August, with Donaldson hitting in the .220s, Green reclaimed his old job, which he'd hold through 1974 and three World Series championships. Donaldson batted only .220 with two home runs and 27 RBI in 127 games in 1968. On June 14, 1969—with Donaldson playing sparingly and collecting only one hit in his first 13 at bats—the Athletics traded him to the Seattle Pilots, a first-year expansion team, for backup catcher Larry Haney. Donaldson took over the Pilots' starting second base job, getting into 90 games at the position, but he hit only .234 with a home run and 19 RBI. The financially moribund Pilots abandoned Seattle at the close of spring training in 1970 and became the Milwaukee Brewers, but Donaldson never played in a Milwaukee uniform. He started 1970 with Triple-A Portland, then was traded back to the Athletics on May 18 for Roberto Peña. He played 41 games for the 1970 Athletics as a utility infielder, and hit .247 with a home run and 11 RBI.

Donaldson would not return to the majors until April 1974. He spent 1971–1973 bouncing among three different organizations and five minor-league destinations until Oakland signed him as a free agent. The Athletics, gunning for their third straight American League pennant and world championship, used Donaldson in ten games, nine of them in April and May, and sent him to Triple-A Tucson for the bulk of the season. At the big-league level, Donaldson hit only .133 in 15 at bats, his tenure marred by a shoulder injury. He was not included on Oakland's 1974 World Series roster.

That season concluded Donaldson's 12-year pro career. All told, he batted .238 with 292 hits, including 35 doubles, 11 triples, four home runs and 86 runs batted in in 405 career games.
