= George Lauzerique =

Cuban baseball player (born 1947)

- Pitcher
- Born: July 22, 1947 (age 79); Havana, Cuba
- Batted: Right Threw: Right

MLB debut
- September 17, 1967, for the Kansas City Athletics

Last MLB appearance
- May 28, 1970, for the Milwaukee Brewers

MLB statistics
- Win–loss record: 4-8
- Earned run average: 5.00
- Strikeouts: 73
- Stats at Baseball Reference

Teams
- Kansas City / Oakland Athletics (1967–1969); Milwaukee Brewers (1970)

George Albert Lauzerique (born July 22, 1947) is a Cuban former professional baseball player. He played in Major League Baseball as a right-handed pitcher from 1967 to 1970 for the Kansas City / Oakland Athletics and the Milwaukee Brewers.

== 1967 ==
Lauzerique was born in Havana, Cuba. Standing at 6'1" tall and weighing 180 pounds, he was drafted by the Athletics in the 10th round (199th overall) of the 1965 draft. He didn't spend much time in the minors-but he did well while there. In 1967 with the Birmingham A's of the Southern League, he went 13 and 4 with a 2.30 ERA. He even tossed a seven inning perfect game at one point that year.

He ended up making his big league debut on September 17, 1967, at the age of 19. He pitched seven solid innings against the California Angels, surrendering just four hits. He ended up receiving the loss though, as the Angels beat the Athletics 3 to 2. His ERA in that game was 3.86.

He was able to bring his season ERA down to 2.25 after giving up only one run in the final nine innings he pitched that year. In three at bats that year, he collected zero hits.

== 1968 ==
In 1968, Lauzerique appeared in only one major league game. On September 15, he pitched one inning in a game that would see the Athletics lose to Bill Freehan and the Detroit Tigers 13 to 0. Lauzerique did not give up a single run, although he did throw one wild pitch and walk a batter.

== 1969 ==
In his final season with the Oakland Athletics, Lauzerique was the sixth most used starter (in terms of total number of starts) on the team. He appeared in 19 games total, starting eight of them and complete one of his starts. In 61+ innings of work, he surrendered 14 home runs, walked 27 and struck out 39. Overall, his ERA 4.70, and his record was 3 and 4.

He collected the first two hits of his career in his first game of the 1969 season: facing the Cleveland Indians in the second game of a doubleheader on May 30, he went 2 for 4 with one run scored. His first hit came off Mike Paul and his second came off Stan Williams. Oddly, those were the only two hits of his entire season – he would end up going 0 for 16 the rest of the year.

That game was also his best pitching-wise that season and possibly of his entire career. In a complete game, he allowed seven hits, walked only one batter, struck out 11, and gave up only one run for the win.

On December 7, 1969, he was traded from the Athletics with Ted Kubiak to the Seattle Pilots for Diego Seguí and Ray Oyler.

== 1970 ==
1970 would end up being Lauzerique's final season in the big leagues. With the Brewers that season, he had the highest ERA among all pitchers on the team with 10 or more innings of work, posting a 6.94 earned run average. He gave up, on average, one home run every five innings that season, surrendering seven in 35 innings of work. He overall record was 1 and 2.

Although his 1970 season was rather unimpressive, it did have a couple bright spots. For one, he did complete a game that year-on April 17 against the Chicago White Sox-allowing nine hits in nine innings of work but still getting the win.

And, like 1969, he collected two hits in one game, with those being the only two hits of his season. In the second inning of the game—off pitcher Gerry Arrigo—he hit a single. The next hit in the game would end up being the most noteworthy hit of his career: in the fifth inning off pitcher Tommie Sisk, he hit a three-run home run which scored Phil Roof, Russ Snyder and himself. Overall in that game, he went 2 for 4 with 2 runs and 4 RBI. The Brewers beat the White Sox 16 to 2.

On October 20 of that year, he was traded with minor leaguer Jesse Huggins and Jerry McNertney to the St. Louis Cardinals for Carl Taylor and Jim Ellis. He never played for the Cardinals in the Majors.

== Career totals ==
Overall, Lauzerique had a four and eight record with a 5.00 ERA in his career. Of the 34 games he appeared in, he started 14 of them and completed two of his starts. In 113+ innings of work, he allowed 110 hits (including 23 home runs), 63 runs (all of them earned). He walked 48 batters, struck out 73, and hit four.

As a batter, he hit .121, collecting four hits in 33 at-bats. He walked zero times, struck out 10 times, scored three times and hit one home run. He drove in four RBI.

He was a perfect fielder, committing zero errors in 26 total chances for a 1.000 fielding percentage.

He wore two numbers in his career: 28 with the Athletics and 49 with the Brewers.
