= Bobby Brooks (baseball) =

American baseball player (1945–1994)

- Outfielder
- Born: November 1, 1945; Los Angeles, California, U.S.
- Died: October 11, 1994 (aged 48); Harbor City, California, U.S.
- Batted: Right Threw: Right

MLB debut
- September 1, 1969, for the Oakland Athletics

Last MLB appearance
- June 5, 1973, for the California Angels

MLB statistics (through Career)
- Batting average: .231
- Home runs: 5
- Hits: 33
- Runs: 19
- RBI: 20
- Stats at Baseball Reference

Teams
- Oakland Athletics (1969–1970, 1972); California Angels (1973)

Robert Brooks (November 1, 1945 – October 11, 1994) was an American professional baseball player. He appeared in 55 games in Major League Baseball over parts of four seasons for the Oakland Athletics (1969–1970 and 1972) and California Angels (1973). An outfielder and native of Los Angeles, he threw and batted right-handed and was listed as 5 feet 8 inches (1.73 m) tall and 165 pounds (75 kg).

== Career ==
Brooks entered pro baseball in 1965 when he was chosen by the Athletics (then in Kansas City) out of Los Angeles Harbor College in the 15th round of the first-ever MLB June amateur draft.

He earned his first big-league call-up in September 1969 after an All-Star season in the Double-A Southern League, when he led the circuit in runs scored (102) and home runs (23), and tied for the league RBI title (100).

Brooks appeared in 29 late-season games for Oakland in 1969, starting 21 as a corner outfielder, smashed three homers and drove in ten runs, batting .241. However, that would be his most extensive big-league trial: over the next four years, he appeared in only 26 total MLB games, and spent all of 1971 and the bulk of the other three seasons in Triple-A. He finished his professional career in 1975 after two years in the Mexican League.

Brooks collected 33 hits in his 55 major-league games, 11 of them for extra bases—six doubles and five homers—along with 20 runs batted in. He batted .231 lifetime.

In retirement, Brooks became an active youth baseball coach in his community, Harbor City, California; a baseball diamond there is named Bobby Brooks Field.

== Death ==
He died of complications from multiple sclerosis on October 11, 1994, at the age of 48. He was buried at Inglewood Park Cemetery.
