= Bobby Hofman =

American baseball player and coach (1925-1994)

- Infielder / Catcher
- Born: October 5, 1925; St. Louis, Missouri, U.S.
- Died: April 5, 1994 (aged 68); Chesterfield, Missouri, U.S.
- Batted: Right Threw: Right

MLB debut
- April 19, 1949, for the New York Giants

Last MLB appearance
- May 5, 1957, for the New York Giants

MLB statistics
- Batting average: .248
- Home runs: 32
- Runs batted in: 101
- Stats at Baseball Reference

Teams
- As player: New York Giants (1949, 1952–1957); As coach: Kansas City Athletics (1966–1967); Washington Senators (1968); Oakland Athletics (1969–1970); Cleveland Indians (1971–1972); Oakland Athletics (1974–1978)

Career highlights and awards
- 2× World Series champion (1954, 1974)

Robert George Hofman (October 5, 1925 – April 5, 1994) was an American infielder, catcher and coach in Major League Baseball. Born in St. Louis, Missouri, Hofman threw and batted right-handed, and stood 5 ft 11 in (180 cm) tall and weighed 175 pounds (79 kg). His early baseball career was interrupted by service in the United States Army during World War II, where he saw action in the European Theater.

== Life and career ==
Hofman's seven-year MLB playing career (1949; 1952–57) was spent entirely with the New York Giants. After a 19-game trial with them in 1949, Hofman made the Giants to stay in 1952 and was a member of their 1954 world championship roster. His managers, Leo Durocher and Bill Rigney, used Hofman in a utilityman role and as a right-handed pinch hitter off the Giant bench. Over the course of his National League career, he would appear in 86 games at second base, 49 games at first base, 45 contests as a third baseman, and 26 as a catcher. As a hitter, he had some power, twice (in 1953 and 1955) reaching double figures in home runs. Overall, he appeared in 341 games, batting .248 with 32 home runs in 670 at bats.

From 1958 through 1965, Hofman managed in minor league baseball with the San Francisco Giants and Kansas City Athletics organizations. In 1966, former teammate Alvin Dark (the starting shortstop for most of Hofman's tenure with the Giants) was named manager of the Athletics, and he added Hofman to his coaching staff. Hofman would go on to coach in the American League for 12 seasons (1966–72; 1974–78) with the Athletics in both Kansas City and Oakland, the Washington Senators and Cleveland Indians. He was a coach, under Dark, on Oakland's 1974 world championship team. After his coaching career, Hofman briefly was Oakland's traveling secretary and, during the 1980s, he served as director of scouting and player development of the New York Yankees. He also managed the Richmond Braves for part of the 1973 season, and overall he compiled a record of 574 victories and 599 defeats (.489) as a minor league pilot.

Hofman died of cancer in Chesterfield, Missouri, at the age of 68.
