= Bob Meyer =

American baseball player (born 1939)

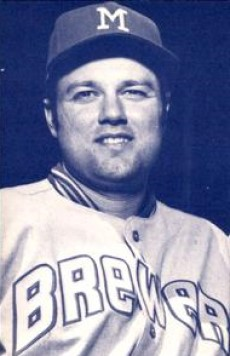
- Pitcher
- Born: August 4, 1939 (age 85); Toledo, Ohio, U.S.
- Batted: Right Threw: Left

MLB debut
- April 20, 1964, for the New York Yankees

Last MLB appearance
- May 20, 1970, for the Milwaukee Brewers

MLB statistics
- Win–loss record: 2–12
- Earned run average: 4.38
- Strikeouts: 92
- Stats at Baseball Reference

Teams
- New York Yankees (1964); Los Angeles Angels (1964); Kansas City Athletics (1964); Seattle Pilots/Milwaukee Brewers (1969–1970)

Robert Bernard Meyer (born August 4, 1939) is an American former Major League Baseball left-handed pitcher. He was signed by the New York Yankees as an amateur free agent in 1960. Meyer pitched for the Yankees (1964), Los Angeles Angels (1964), Kansas City Athletics (1964), Seattle Pilots/Milwaukee Brewers (1969–1970). His first major league strikeout victim was future Hall of Famer Carl Yastrzemski. During a three-year baseball career, Meyer compiled two wins, 92 strikeouts, and a 4.38 earned run average.

On September 12, 1964, while starting for the Athletics on the road at Memorial Stadium, he and Baltimore Orioles left-hander Frank Bertaina each pitched a complete game one-hitter, but the A's lost 1–0 as Jackie Brandt hit a sacrifice fly in the bottom of the eighth to score pinch-runner Bob Saverine from third.

Other career highlights include a six scoreless inning win against the Kansas City Athletics on June 26, 1964, a six-hit, complete game win (6–1) against the Baltimore Orioles on September 7, 1964, and pitching the first nine innings and giving up one unearned run in a 13-inning victory over the New York Yankees on September 1, 1969.
