= Roberto Peña =

Dominican baseball player (1937–1982)

- Shortstop
- Born: April 17, 1937; Santo Domingo, Dominican Republic
- Died: July 23, 1982 (aged 45); Santo Domingo, Dominican Republic
- Batted: Right Threw: Right

MLB debut
- April 12, 1965, for the Chicago Cubs

Last MLB appearance
- September 30, 1971, for the Milwaukee Brewers

MLB statistics
- Batting average: .245
- Home runs: 13
- Runs batted in: 154
- Stats at Baseball Reference

Teams
- Chicago Cubs (1965–1966); Philadelphia Phillies (1968); San Diego Padres (1969); Oakland Athletics (1970); Milwaukee Brewers (1970–1971)

Roberto Cesar Peña (April 17, 1937 – July 23, 1982) was a Dominican professional baseball shortstop, who played in Major League Baseball (MLB) for the Chicago Cubs (1965–66), Philadelphia Phillies (1968), San Diego Padres (1969), Oakland Athletics (1970), and Milwaukee Brewers (1970–71). He represented the Dominican Republic at the 1959 Pan American Games, in Chicago.
