= Larry Haney =

American baseball player (born 1942)

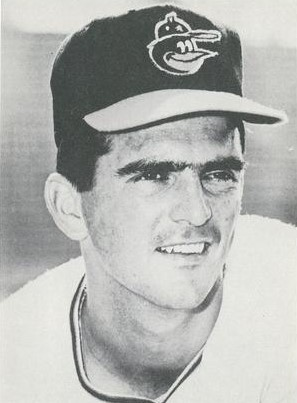
- Catcher
- Born: November 19, 1942 (age 83); Charlottesville, Virginia, U.S.
- Batted: Right Threw: Right

MLB debut
- July 27, 1966, for the Baltimore Orioles

Last MLB appearance
- October 1, 1978, for the Milwaukee Brewers

MLB statistics
- Batting average: .215
- Home runs: 12
- Runs batted in: 73
- Stats at Baseball Reference

Teams
- Baltimore Orioles (1966–1968); Seattle Pilots (1969); Oakland Athletics (1969–1973, 1974–1976); St. Louis Cardinals (1973); Milwaukee Brewers (1977–1978)

Career highlights and awards
- 2× World Series champion (1966, 1974)

Wallace Larry Haney (born November 19, 1942) is an American former catcher who played in Major League Baseball (MLB). He played from 1966 to 1978 for the Baltimore Orioles, Seattle Pilots / Milwaukee Brewers, Oakland Athletics, and St. Louis Cardinals. Haney later served as bullpen coach with the Brewers. His son, Chris Haney, pitched in the majors, primarily for the Kansas City Royals. During a 13-year baseball career, he hit .215, with 12 home runs and 73 runs batted in.

Haney was valued by teams mainly for his defensive abilities. In addition to his .985 fielding percentage and skill at working with pitching staffs, he threw out 110 of 282 stolen base attempts (39.0%) and picked off nine baserunners during his career. He was acquired three separate times by the Oakland A's, and was on their roster during their entire World Championship year of 1974.

On July 27, 1966, Haney hit a home run in his first major league game (second at bat) against John O'Donoghue of the Cleveland Indians.

On September 6, 1968, Haney had his first and only four-hit game, when he hit three singles and a double against the Chicago White Sox. He also recorded five three-hit games in his career.

Haney played in two World Series games for the Oakland A's in 1974 against the Los Angeles Dodgers.

In his minor league career, he led California League catchers with 18 double plays and 38 passed balls while playing for the Stockton Ports in 1962, and led Eastern League catchers with 17 double plays while playing for the Elmira Pioneers in 1963.

After his major league career, Haney went to work for the Milwaukee Brewers organization. He was a major league coach in 1978–91, serving as bullpen coach from 1978 until 1989 and pitching coach in 1990 and 1991. He continued working for the Brewers in various capacities until 2006.

Haney's Topps baseball cards for 1968 and 1969 are popular because the 1969 card is simply the reverse image of the 1968 card. He appears as a left-handed throwing catcher (with a mitt that fits on his right hand) in the 1969 card. The player/coach in the background (of both cards) is also reversed.
