= Ted Kubiak =

American baseball player (born 1942)

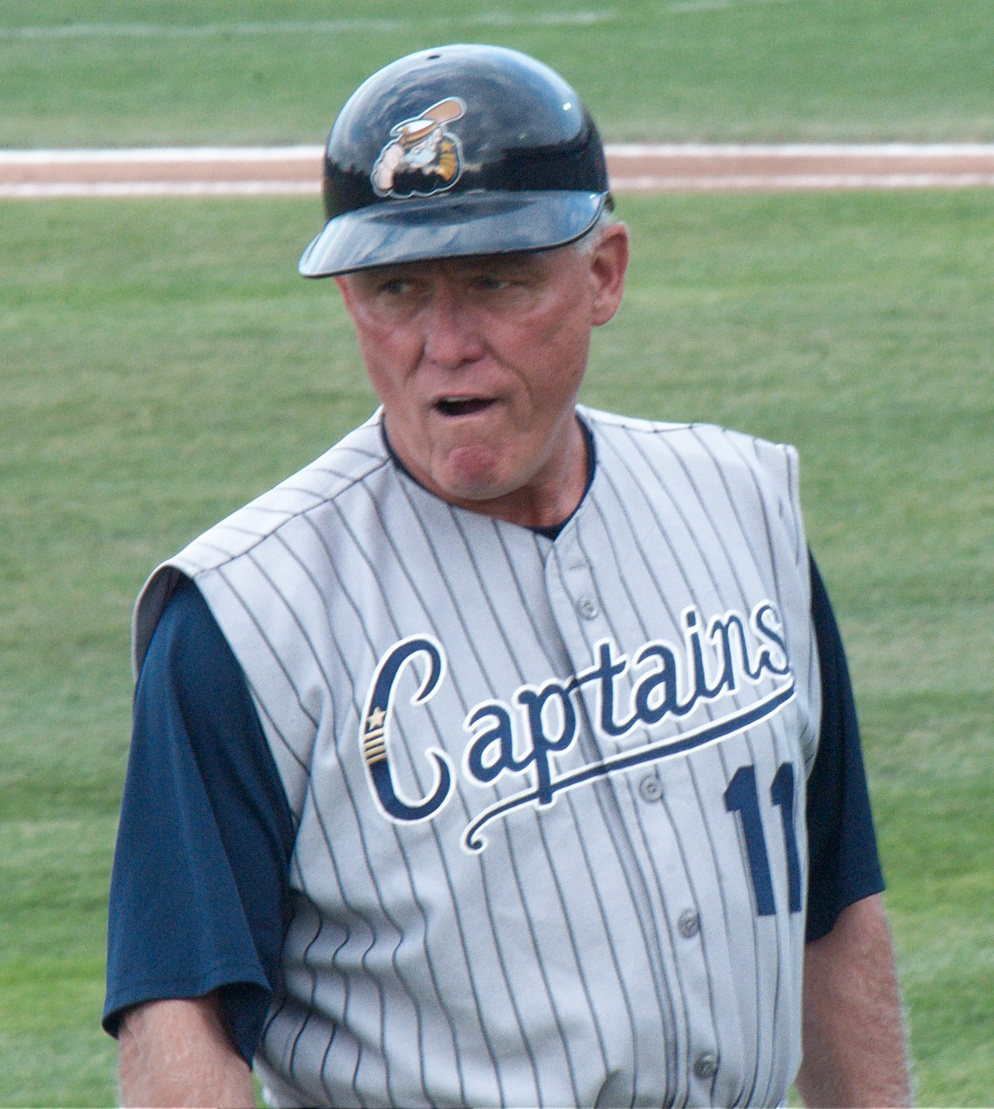
- Kubiak with the Lake County Captains in 2010
- Infielder
- Born: May 12, 1942 (age 84); New Brunswick, New Jersey, U.S.
- Batted: Switch Threw: Right

MLB debut
- April 14, 1967, for the Kansas City Athletics

Last MLB appearance
- September 28, 1976, for the San Diego Padres

MLB statistics
- Batting average: .231
- Home runs: 13
- Runs batted in: 202
- Stats at Baseball Reference

Teams
- Kansas City / Oakland Athletics (1967–1969); Milwaukee Brewers (1970–1971); St. Louis Cardinals (1971); Texas Rangers (1972); Oakland Athletics (1972–1975); San Diego Padres (1975–1976)

Career highlights and awards
- 3× World Series champion (1972–1974)

Theodore Rodger Kubiak (born May 12, 1942) is an American former professional baseball player and manager. He played as an infielder in Major League Baseball from 1967 through 1976, most notably as a member of the Oakland Athletics dynasty that won three consecutive World Series championships between 1972 and 1974. He also played for the Milwaukee Brewers, St. Louis Cardinals, Texas Rangers, and the San Diego Padres.

== Personal life ==
Kubiak was born in New Brunswick, New Jersey, the only child of Theodore Kubiak, a traffic manager for Gerber Plumbing, and Margaret "Marge" (née Pochinski) Kubiak. He had planned to study architecture at the Pratt Institute, but his baseball career kept him from going, which he later said he regretted. He joined the National Guard in 1967, and in 1973 he married the daughter of Irv Noren, a former major league outfielder who was then an Athletics coach. Kubiak has two children, Justin and Kristi, from an earlier marriage. After leaving the Padres in 1977, he did occasional color commentary on Athletics television broadcasts with Hank Greenwald in 1978. He then worked in real estate in the Bay Area, renovating houses and apartment buildings, until he returned to baseball in 1989.

== Baseball career ==
Kubiak grew up in Highland Park, New Jersey and is a graduate of Highland Park High School, class of 1960. He was signed by the Kansas City Athletics as an amateur free agent in September 1960 by scout Ray Sanders. He played in the minor leagues for six seasons before making his major league debut at the age of 24 with the Athletics on April 14, 1967. The Athletics franchise moved from Kansas City to Oakland, California prior to the 1968 season. On December 7, 1969, the Athletics traded Kubiak along with George Lauzerique to the Milwaukee Brewers for Ray Oyler and Diego Segui.

Kubiak produced the best offensive statistics of his career while playing for the Brewers in 1970, posting career-highs in games played (152), batting average (.252), home runs (4) and runs batted in (41). Kubiak still holds the Brewers' record for most RBIs in a single game with 7 (later equalled by 8 other Milwaukee players), which he set at Boston on July 18, 1970, the team's first year in Milwaukee.

== Managerial career ==
Kubiak reentered baseball as a manager and took over as the manager of the Modesto A's in mid-1989 from Lenn Sakata. He remained in Modesto for four more years before joining the Cleveland Indians organization in 1994. He managed the Canton–Akron Indians in 1994 and 1995, then moved down to the New York–Penn League for five years. He was with the Watertown Indians from 1996 to 1998, and the Mahoning Valley Scrappers in 1999 and 2000. He moved up to the Columbus RedStixx in 2001, the Kinston Indians in 2002, then returned to Mahoning Valley in 2003. From 2004 to 2008 he was the minor league defensive coordinator for the Cleveland Indians. In 2009, he returned to managing with the Arizona Extended League Indians, in 2010 managed the Lake County Captains to the Midwest League Championship, and in 2012 he returned to Mahoning Valley to begin his 4th season at the helm of the Scrappers.
