= Jerry McNertney =

American baseball player (born 1936)

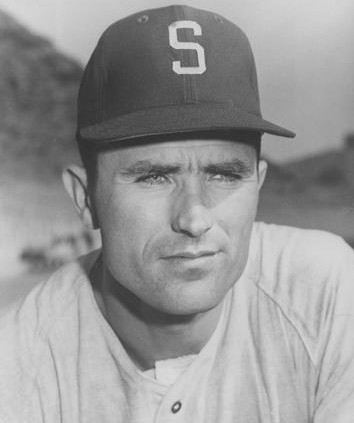
- McNertney in 1969
- Catcher
- Born: August 7, 1936 (age 89); Boone, Iowa, U.S.
- Batted: Right Threw: Right

MLB debut
- April 16, 1964, for the Chicago White Sox

Last MLB appearance
- June 15, 1973, for the Pittsburgh Pirates

MLB statistics
- Batting average: .237
- Home runs: 27
- Runs batted in: 163
- Stats at Baseball Reference

Teams
- Chicago White Sox (1964; 1966–1968); Seattle Pilots / Milwaukee Brewers (1969–1970); St. Louis Cardinals (1971–1972); Pittsburgh Pirates (1973)

Gerald Edward McNertney (born August 7, 1936) is an American former professional baseball player and coach. He played in Major League Baseball as a catcher in 1964 and then from 1966 to 1973.

== Career ==
Born in Boone, Iowa, McNertney signed with the Chicago White Sox in 1958 after attending Gilbert High School and Iowa State University. During his first three seasons in minor league baseball, he was a first baseman and outfielder and converted to catcher in his fourth professional season, 1961, while playing for the Charleston White Sox of the Class A South Atlantic League.

Despite his late conversion, McNertney developed into a good defensive catcher and made his major league debut at the age of 27 with the White Sox in 1964. He played in 1964 and from 1966 to 1973 for the White Sox, Seattle Pilots / Milwaukee Brewers, St. Louis Cardinals, and Pittsburgh Pirates. McNertney led American League catchers in 1967 with a 54.8% caught stealing percentage.

McNertney was the regular catcher for the Pilots in 1969—the only year the franchise played in the Pacific Northwest—where he reached career highs in at bats (410), home runs (8) and runs batted in (55). 1969 was also his best year defensively as he led the league's catchers in base runners caught stealing and finished second in assists and in putouts.

McNertney was the last player to bat in Seattle Pilots history, striking out for the final out of the team's final game on October 2, 1969. The 1969 Seattle Pilots season was immortalized by the book Ball Four, written by his Seattle teammate, Jim Bouton. McNertney played in his final major league game for the Pittsburgh Pirates on June 15, 1973 at the age of 36.

== Career statistics ==
In a nine-year major league career, McNertney played in 590 games, accumulating 337 hits in 1,423 at bats for a .237 career batting average, along with 27 home runs, 163 runs batted in and an on-base percentage of .298. He had a career fielding percentage of .987.

== Coaching career ==
After his playing career ended, McNertney was the bullpen coach for the New York Yankees in 1984 and for the Boston Red Sox during the latter half of the 1988 season, after coaching in the Yankees' farm system during the early 1980s.
