= Fred Talbot (baseball) =

American baseball player (1941–2013)

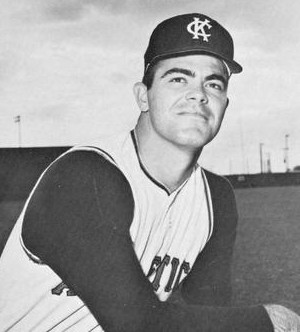
- Pitcher
- Born: June 28, 1941; Washington, D.C., U.S.
- Died: January 11, 2013 (aged 71); Falls Church, Virginia, U.S.
- Batted: Right Threw: Right

MLB debut
- September 28, 1963, for the Chicago White Sox

Last MLB appearance
- June 14, 1970, for the Oakland Athletics

MLB statistics
- Win–loss record: 38–56
- Earned run average: 4.12
- Strikeouts: 449
- Stats at Baseball Reference

Teams
- Chicago White Sox (1963–1964); Kansas City / Oakland Athletics (1965–1966, 1969–1970); New York Yankees (1966–1969); Seattle Pilots (1969)

Frederick Lealand Talbot (June 28, 1941 – January 11, 2013) was an American Major League Baseball pitcher. He pitched from 1963 to 1970 for the New York Yankees, Kansas City / Oakland Athletics, Seattle Pilots, and Chicago White Sox. He attended Fairfax High School in Fairfax, Virginia.

After his baseball career ended, Talbot worked in the construction business before retiring in 1996. He died following a long illness in Falls Church, Virginia, on January 11, 2013, at age 71.
