= Blue Moon Odom =

American baseball player (born 1945)

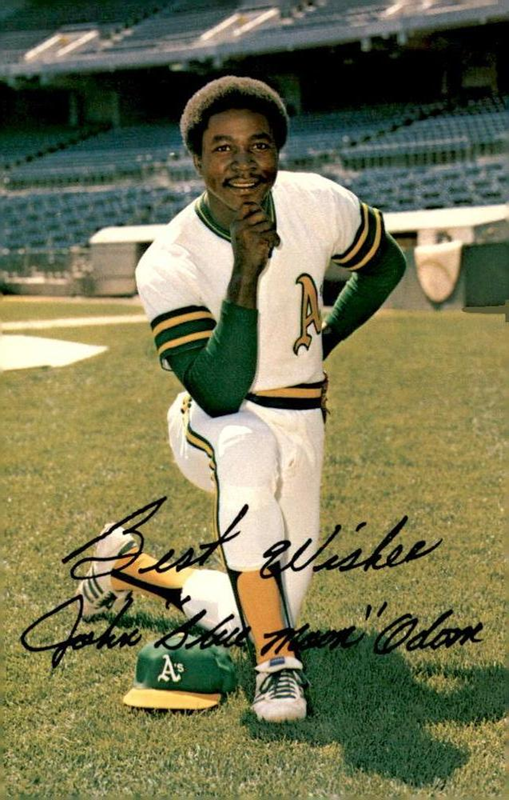
- Odom in 1973 postcard
- Pitcher
- Born: May 29, 1945 (age 81); Macon, Georgia, U.S.
- Batted: Right Threw: Right

MLB debut
- September 5, 1964, for the Kansas City Athletics

Last MLB appearance
- August 17, 1976, for the Chicago White Sox

MLB statistics
- Win–loss record: 84–85
- Earned run average: 3.70
- Strikeouts: 857
- Stats at Baseball Reference

Teams
- Kansas City / Oakland Athletics (1964–1975); Cleveland Indians (1975); Atlanta Braves (1975); Chicago White Sox (1976)

Career highlights and awards
- 2× All-Star (1968, 1969); 3× World Series champion (1972–1974); Pitched combined no-hitter on July 28, 1976; Athletics Hall of Fame

Johnny Lee "Blue Moon" Odom (born May 29, 1945) is an American former professional baseball player. He played as a right-handed pitcher in Major League Baseball from 1964 through 1976, most notably as a member of the Oakland Athletics dynasty that won three consecutive World Series championships between 1972 and 1974. The two-time All-Star also played for the Cleveland Indians, Atlanta Braves, and Chicago White Sox.

== Early years ==
Odom was nicknamed Blue Moon in grade-school by a classmate who thought Odom's round face resembled the moon. Odom led Ballard-Hudson High School in Macon, Georgia, to two consecutive state championships while amassing a 42–2 record. He signed with the Kansas City Athletics upon graduation.

== Baseball career ==
=== Kansas City/Oakland Athletics ===
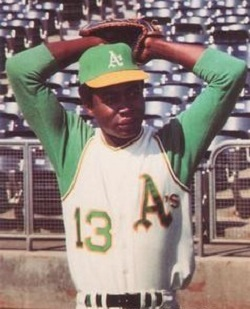
Odom in 1969

Odom began his professional baseball career with the Birmingham Barons of the Southern League. After one season in Birmingham, he received a September call-up to the Kansas City Athletics in 1964, and made his major league debut at just nineteen years old on September 5 at Municipal Stadium in Kansas City. Odom lasted just two innings against the New York Yankees, giving up a three-run home run in the first inning to Mickey Mantle and surrendering three more runs in the second before giving way to the bullpen.

Odom spent the entire 1965 season with the Lewiston Broncs of the Northwest League. For the season, he went 11–14 with a 4.27 earned run average and led the league in games started (29) and innings pitched (198). He only made one appearance at the major league level all season, pitching one inning and allowing one earned run against the Washington Senators on September 22.

Odom split the 1966 season between Kansas City and the double A Mobile A's, going 5–5 with a 2.49 ERA at the major league level. He began the 1967 season in Kansas City but was demoted in July with a 2–4 record and 5.15 ERA. For the season, he went 3–8 with a 5.04 ERA.

Odom's arrival as a quality major league starter would essentially coincide with his franchise's arrival the next season in Oakland, California, as he improved to 16–10 with a 2.45 ERA once team owner Charles O. Finley relocated his franchise. He had a no-hitter against the Baltimore Orioles broken up by a Davey Johnson single with two out in the ninth on June 7, 1968. Baltimore scored a run in the first on three walks as Odom walked eight in the game. He finished third in the American League with 98 walks and tied Frank Bertaina for the league lead in wild pitches with seventeen. He was also named to his first All-Star Game, and pitched two scoreless innings.

Odom was simply dominant in the first half of the 1969 season, going 14–3 with a 2.41 ERA heading into the All-Star break. He also showed himself to be one of the league's better-hitting pitchers as he went 3-for-3 with a home run and six runs batted in (RBI) against the Seattle Pilots on May 4. He was named to his second consecutive All Star team, but was tagged for five runs (four earned) in just a third of an inning as the National League cruised to a 9–3 victory. His numbers tailed off considerably following the All-Star break, as he went 1–3 with a 4.09 ERA in the second half of the season.

Odom was on the A's roster in both 1970 and 1971.

After finishing second to the Minnesota Twins two years in a row in the newly realigned American League West, the Athletics won the division in 1971, but were swept by the Orioles in the 1971 American League Championship Series.

Before the start of the 1972 season, Odom was shot twice while trying to prevent a burglary at his neighbor's house. He recovered, and went 15–6 with a 2.50 ERA in a rotation that also included future Hall of Famer and Cy Young award winner Catfish Hunter, two-time no-hitter throwing Ken Holtzman, and simultaneous Cy Young and MVP-winner Vida Blue as the A's cruised to their second consecutive division title in 1972.

==== World Series starts ====
In his first post-season start, Odom shutout the Detroit Tigers, holding them to just three hits in the second game of the 1972 American League Championship Series to give Oakland a 2–0 series lead. The Tigers came back to tie the series as Odom took the mound for game five of the ALCS. He held the Tigers to just one unearned run in five innings, and Vida Blue pitched the final four innings as the A's beat the Tigers 2–1.

Although both pitchers pitched well, and their team was now headed to the World Series, a fight broke out between the two men after the game. After going 24–8 with a 1.82 ERA and winning the Cy Young Award in 1971, Vida Blue had a disappointing 1972 season in which he went 6-10. As a result, manager Dick Williams decided to use Blue as a reliever in the post-season.

Blue was unhappy with this decision and made his feelings known. During the team's post-game celebration on October 12, Blue joked with Odom that he choked, and needed to be rescued by him. At some point, the joking turned serious and nearly came to blows.

Oakland held a 2–0 game lead against Cincinnati's "Big Red Machine" in the 1972 World Series as Odom faced Jack Billingham in game three. Odom had allowed just one hit and two walks while striking out ten in six innings before giving up his first post-season earned run in the seventh inning. Unfortunately for Odom, Billingham was even more dominant, as he pitched eight scoreless innings to lead the Cincinnati Reds to a 1–0 victory.

In game five, Odom was used as a pinch runner with Oakland trailing 5–4 in the bottom of the ninth inning. With one out and Odom on third base, he tried to score after Reds second baseman Joe Morgan caught a pop fly in foul territory, and was thrown out at the home plate to end the ball game.

Odom and Billingham were again embroiled in a pitchers' duel in game seven of the World Series, this time with Odom leading 1-0 before both pitchers gave way to their bullpens. The A's won the game 3–2, giving the franchise their first world championship since moving to Oakland. For the post-season, Odom was 2–1 with a 0.71 ERA and eighteen strikeouts in 25.1 innings pitched.

Though Odom fell to 5–12 with a 4.49 ERA in 1973, his A's returned to the post-season. Odom was used in relief by Dick Williams during the 1973 post-season. He made just one appearance in the 1973 American League Championship Series, pitching five innings and giving up just one earned run in their 6–0 loss to the Orioles in game two.

Odom made two appearances in the World Series against the New York Mets. In game two, he pitched two scoreless innings. Odom entered game four of the series with only one out, two men on and three runs already on the board in the first inning. Odom got Don Hahn to ground into a double play to end the inning. He left the game in the fourth without giving up a run, however, Darold Knowles allowed both base runners he inherited from Odom to score.

Odom was used in relief in the 1974 season, earning his only career save on August 30 against the Detroit Tigers. The A's once again faced the Baltimore Orioles in the ALCS, beating them in four games. Odom's only appearance came in their game one loss.

Just before the start of the World Series against the Los Angeles Dodgers, Odom and fellow A's reliever, Rollie Fingers got into a fight in the A's locker room after Odom commented on Fingers' wife. The incident lasted less than a minute, however, Fingers required six stitches on his head, and Odom sprained his ankle and had a noticeable limp.

Regardless of his injury, Odom pitched a scoreless ninth inning in game two, and earned the win in game five. Odom faced just one batter, Davey Lopes, in the fifth and final game of the World Series. Lopes grounded out to end the seventh inning with the score tied, 2-2. Joe Rudi led off the following inning with a home run to put Oakland up 3–2, and give Odom the win.

=== Oakland, Cleveland, and Atlanta ===
Odom made just seven appearances for the A's in 1975 before a May 20 trade sent him to the Cleveland Indians for Dick Bosman and Jim Perry. After just a month in Cleveland, Odom was traded again, this time to the Atlanta Braves for Roric Harrison. Odom went 2–9 with a 7.22 ERA for his three clubs.

Odom began the 1976 season playing minor league ball for the Atlanta Braves, and did not see any major league experience until a June 15 trade sent him to the Chicago White Sox for Pete Varney. In just his second start for the ChiSox on July 28, Odom combined with reliever Francisco Barrios to pitch a no-hitter against his former team, the Oakland A's. Odom pitched the first five innings, Barrios the last four, in what would be his last big-league victory.

Odom pitched six games for Oakland's triple-A affiliate, the San Jose Missions in 1977 before retiring. He was asked to represent the Athletics at the 2008 First-Year Player Draft, June 5 in Lake Buena Vista, Florida.

=== Career stats ===
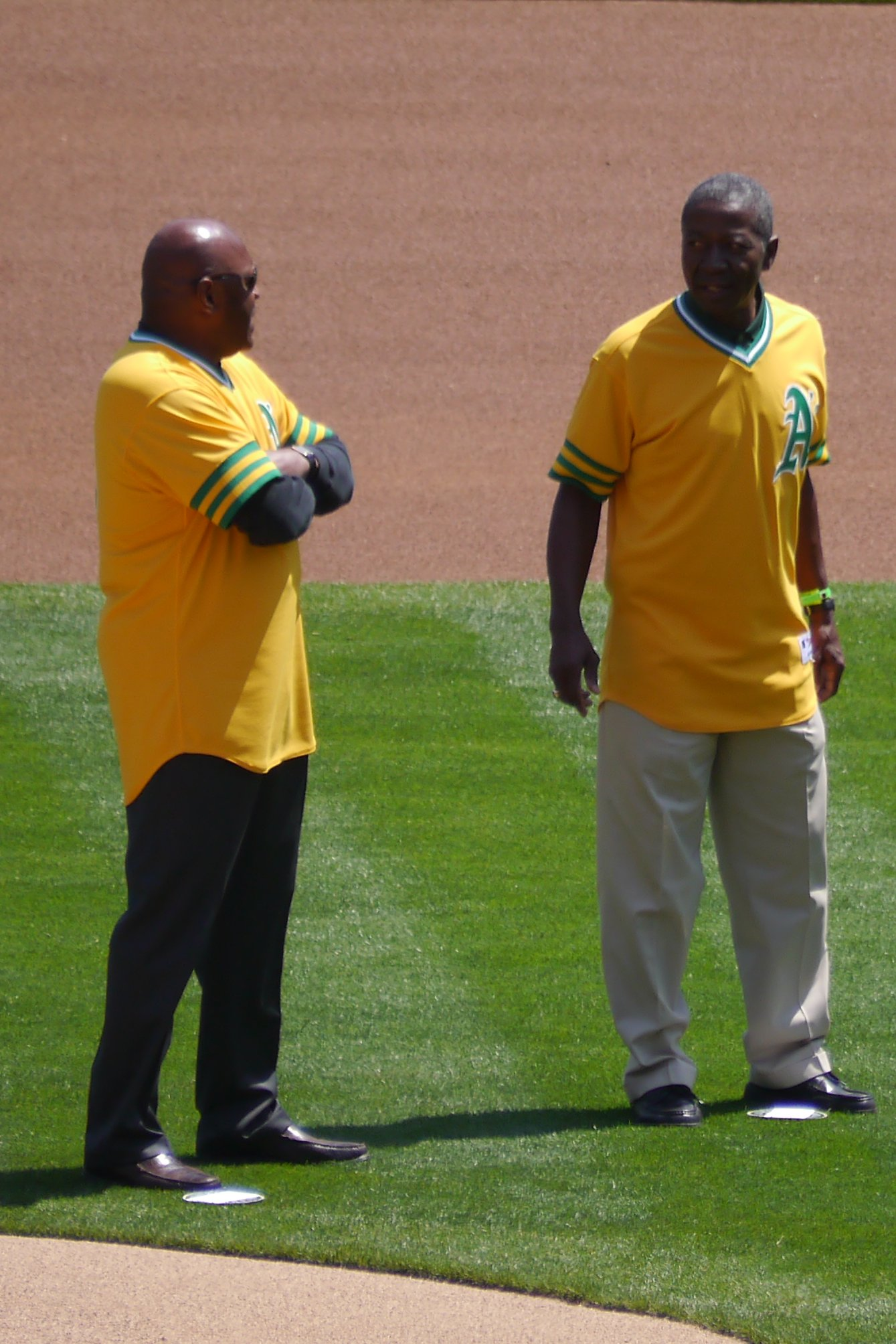
Vida Blue (left) and Odom (right) at the Oakland Athletics' 1973 World Series reunion

W	L	PCT	ERA	G	GS	CG	SHO	SV	IP	H	ER	R	HR	BB	K	WP	HBP	Fld%
84	85	.497	3.70	295	229	40	15	1	1509	1362	620	708	103	788	857	92	36	.904

An excellent athlete, Odom was used 105 times as a pinch-runner. He also wielded a strong bat (for a pitcher), hitting twelve home runs with a .195 career batting average. Odom had a 3–1 career record in the post-season with a 1.13 ERA and 27 strikeouts.

== Personal life ==
Odom was arrested twice in 1985. The first time was for selling cocaine to a co-worker. Then, during the trial, he was arrested a second time on December 11, for assault with a deadly weapon as he held his wife, Gayle, at gunpoint with a shotgun, holding police at bay for six hours. He ended up spending six weeks in alcohol rehabilitation and another 55 days in jail for the drug conviction.

Odom was inducted into the Georgia Sports Hall of Fame in 2004.

Preceded by Larry Dierker	No-hitter; July 28, 1976 (with Francisco Barrios)	Succeeded by John Candelaria
