= Birmingham A's =

- 1967–1975; Birmingham, Alabama

Minor league affiliations
- Class: Double-A (1967–1975)
- League: Southern League (1967–1975)

Major league affiliations
- Team: Oakland Athletics (1968–1975); Kansas City Athletics (1967)

Minor league titles
- Dixie Series titles (1): 1967
- League titles (1): 1967

Team data
- Name: Birmingham A's (1967–1975)
- Ballpark: Rickwood Field (1967–1975)

The Birmingham A's were a Minor League Baseball team in Birmingham, Alabama, that played in the Double-A Southern League from 1967 to 1975. They played their home games at Rickwood Field, and were named after their Major League Baseball affiliates, the Kansas City Athletics (1967) and Oakland Athletics (1968–1975).

== Players ==
- Birmingham A's players (1967–1975)
