= Tito Francona =

American baseball player (1933–2018)

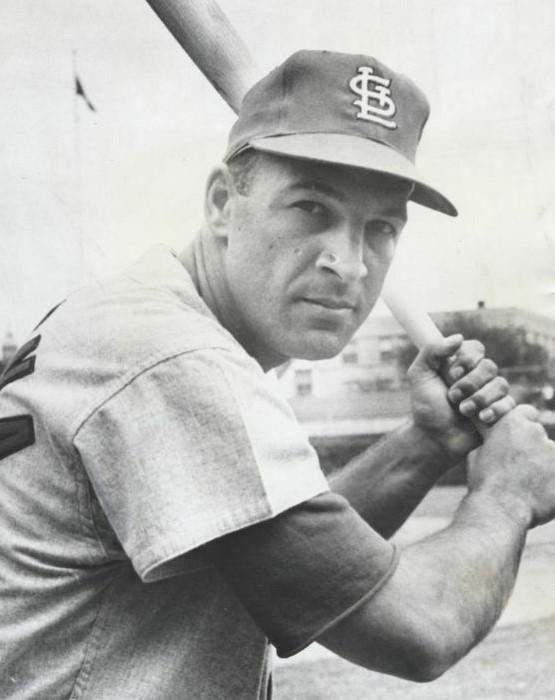
- Outfielder / First baseman
- Born: November 4, 1933; Aliquippa, Pennsylvania, U.S.
- Died: February 13, 2018 (aged 84); New Brighton, Pennsylvania, U.S.
- Batted: Left Threw: Left

MLB debut
- April 17, 1956, for the Baltimore Orioles

Last MLB appearance
- September 29, 1970, for the Milwaukee Brewers

MLB statistics
- Batting average: .272
- Home runs: 125
- Runs batted in: 656
- Stats at Baseball Reference

Teams
- Baltimore Orioles (1956–1957); Chicago White Sox (1958); Detroit Tigers (1958); Cleveland Indians (1959–1964); St. Louis Cardinals (1965–1966); Philadelphia Phillies (1967); Atlanta Braves (1967–1969); Oakland Athletics (1969–1970); Milwaukee Brewers (1970)

Career highlights and awards
- All-Star (1961²)

John Patsy Francona (November 4, 1933 – February 13, 2018) was an American Major League Baseball player, an outfielder and first baseman for nine teams. As a child, he was nicknamed "Tito" by his father.

== Baltimore Orioles ==
Francona originally signed with the St. Louis Browns in 1952. He spent two seasons in the Browns/Baltimore Orioles' farm system (the franchise was relocated to Baltimore and renamed on September 29, 1953) before departing to serve in the U.S. Army for two years. Upon his return, he was invited to Spring training 1956 as a non-roster invitee, and made the club. He batted .258 with nine home runs and 57 runs batted in to finish tied with the Cleveland Indians' Rocky Colavito for second place in American League Rookie of the Year balloting behind Chicago White Sox shortstop Luis Aparicio.

With Al Pilarcik's acquisition during the off season, Francona lost his starting job in right field, and was demoted to the Pacific Coast League's Vancouver Mounties early in the 1957 season. He returned with a vengeance, hitting two home runs in a game for the first time in his career on May 19 against the Kansas City Athletics, raising his season average to an even .300 in the process. He slipped into more of a reserve role from there. Used as a fourth outfielder and left-handed bat off the bench, Francona batted just .185 as a pinch hitter for the season. After which, he, Ray Moore and Billy Goodman were dealt to the Chicago White Sox for Larry Doby, Jack Harshman and Jim Marshall (Chicago later sent pitcher Russ Heman to Baltimore as part of this deal when it was discovered by the Orioles that Harshman was suffering from a slipped disc).

== Chicago White Sox/Detroit Tigers ==
After a hot Spring, Francona won the White Sox starting right field job. His stay in Chicago was short, as he was dealt to the Detroit Tigers on the June 15 trade deadline. With Hall of Famer Al Kaline in right, Francona logged just 84 plate appearances over the remainder of the season. Dissatisfied with his lack of playing time, Francona demanded a trade. On March 21, 1959, he was traded to the Cleveland Indians for Larry Doby, the second trade involving the two.

== Cleveland Indians ==
Regardless of his desire for more playing time, Francona began the 1959 season as a pinch hitter and utility man with his new franchise. After going five-for-nine with a home run in a June 7 doubleheader with the New York Yankees, Francona replaced Jim Piersall as Cleveland's starting center fielder. Toward the end of the season, he was shifted to first base, with Indians regular first baseman Vic Power being shifted to second base. For the season, he batted .363 with a career high 20 home runs and 79 RBIs to help the Indians to an 89–65 record and second place in the American League. His .363 average would have led the league. However, he fell 34 at-bats short of the 3.1 per game necessary to qualify. The batting championship was awarded to the Detroit Tigers' Harvey Kuenn, with a .353 batting average.

Francona was shifted to left field when the Indians acquired Kuenn for home run leader Rocky Colavito just prior to the start of the 1960 season. With Colavito gone, Francona was inserted in the clean-up spot in manager Joe Gordon's batting order. After hitting only six home runs through the month of July, Francona was dropped to the number six spot in the batting order for August, and up to the number two spot in September. The moves helped, as he hit eleven home runs over the rest of the season to finish with seventeen. His 36 doubles led the American League.

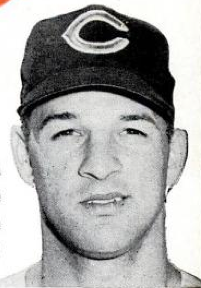
Francona with the Cleveland Indians in 1960

On March 26, 1961, Francona hit a home run during a spring training exhibition game against the Boston Red Sox at Hi Corbett Field. When John C. Cota, a city parks employee, went to retrieve the ball, he discovered the body of Fred Victor Burden, who was wanted by Tucson, Arizona police in connection with the shooting death of former prize fighter James Cocio.

Francona was batting .293 with eleven home runs and 53 RBIs at the second All-Star break of the 1961 season to be named to the American League All-Star squad for the only time in his career. He did not, however, appear in the game. For the season, he batted .301 with sixteen home runs, 85 RBIs and led American League Left Fielders in Fielding Percentage.

Despite having emerged as one of the better fielding left fielders in the league, Francona was shifted to first base during spring training in 1962 and finished the season leading the American League in double plays turned as a first baseman. He drew the ire of Boston sports fans at Fenway Park on June 11. With the game still scoreless, the Indians loaded the bases with two outs in the third inning. From first base, Francona yelled, "Hold it, Earl!" to Red Sox pitcher Earl Wilson. Francona's distraction caused Wilson to half stumble off the mound and balk. Despite this being against baseball rules, Francona admitted after the game that he had indeed yelled to Wilson.

Francona slumped a little under new manager Mel McGaha in 1962. When Birdie Tebbetts grabbed the reins in 1963, Francona was moved back into left, but his numbers dipped even further. His .228 batting average was a career low, and his ten home runs and 41 RBIs were his fewest over a full season. He was, however, part of baseball history on July 31, when he hit the third in a series of four consecutive home runs in a single inning against pitcher Paul Foytack of the Los Angeles Angels. This was the second time in baseball history that a team hit four consecutive home runs in a single inning. It has happened three times since, including once by the Red Sox while his son was managing; that son, Terry Francona, is also often referred to as "Tito."

The Indians acquired All-Star Leon Wagner to play left field prior to the 1964 season, so Francona split time between right and first base. After the season, he was dealt to the St. Louis Cardinals for a player to be named later and cash.

== Journeyman years ==
The World Series champions were already set in their corner outfield positions and at first base; Francona was acquired strictly to strengthen their bench. He batted .259 in 1965, including .265 as a pinch hitter. He remained a pinch hitter with the Cardinals through 1966. During spring training 1967, his contract was sold to the Philadelphia Phillies.

Francona batted .205 with three RBIs filling in for an injured Bill White at first base for the Phillies. Upon his healthy return, Francona was sold to the Atlanta Braves. He enjoyed something of a resurgence in Atlanta, batting .248 with six home runs and 25 RBIs over the remainder of the 1967 season. In 1968, he logged 398 plate appearances, his most since 1963, and batted .296 with 47 RBIs, his most since 1962.

Francona was batting .339 with fourteen RBIs in semi-regular action in 1969 before a dislocated thumb halted his season. He returned healthy toward the end of June, but batted just .219 with one home run and eight RBIs in his return before his contract was sold to the Oakland Athletics on August 22. He returned to his hitting ways, batting .341 with three home runs and twenty RBIs over the rest of the season. He split the 1970 season between the A's and Milwaukee Brewers before retiring.

== Career stats ==
Seasons	Games	PA	AB	Runs	Hits	2B	3B	HR	RBI	SB	BB	SO	Avg.	Slg.	OBP	Fld%
15	1719	5775	5121	650	1395	224	34	125	656	46	544	694	.272	.403	.343	.988

His 1000th hit came off Los Angeles Angels All-Star Ken McBride on April 23, 1964.

- List of second-generation Major League Baseball players
- List of Major League Baseball annual doubles leaders

== Post-baseball career ==
Francona was the director of parks and recreation in New Brighton, Pennsylvania until retiring in 1997. He remained in New Brighton until his death at his home on February 13, 2018.
