= Mike Hershberger =

American baseball player (1939–2012)

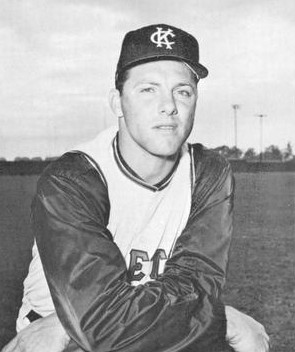
- Outfielder
- Born: October 9, 1939; Massillon, Ohio, U.S.
- Died: July 1, 2012 (aged 72); Massillon, Ohio, U.S.
- Batted: Right Threw: Right

MLB debut
- September 5, 1961, for the Chicago White Sox

Last MLB appearance
- September 17, 1971, for the Chicago White Sox

MLB statistics
- Batting average: .252
- Home runs: 26
- Runs batted in: 344
- Stats at Baseball Reference

Teams
- Chicago White Sox (1961–1964); Kansas City / Oakland Athletics (1965–1969); Milwaukee Brewers (1970); Chicago White Sox (1971)

Norman Michael Hershberger (October 9, 1939 – July 1, 2012) was an American professional baseball player and outfielder for the Chicago White Sox (1961–1964, 1971), Kansas City / Oakland Athletics (1965–1969) and Milwaukee Brewers (1970) during an 11-season Major League Baseball career. Born in Massillon, Ohio, he threw and batted right-handed, stood 5 feet 10 inches (1.78 m) tall and weighed 175 pounds (79 kg).

He signed with the White Sox in 1959 after graduating from Massillon High School and attending the University of Cincinnati. He held down a starting corner outfielder job in the majors for seven straight years (1962–1968), and in 1966 led the American League in sacrifice flies (7) during his tenure with the Athletics.

In his 11 MLB seasons, Hershberger played in 1,150 games and had 3,572 at bats, 398 runs, 900 hits, 150 doubles, 22 triples, 26 home runs, 344 runs batted in, 74 stolen bases, 319 walks, .252 batting average, .316 on-base percentage, .328 slugging percentage, 1,172 total bases, 33 sacrifice hits, 28 sacrifice flies and 19 intentional walks.

He died in Massillon on July 1, 2012, following a brief illness.
