= Danny Cater =

American baseball player (born 1940)

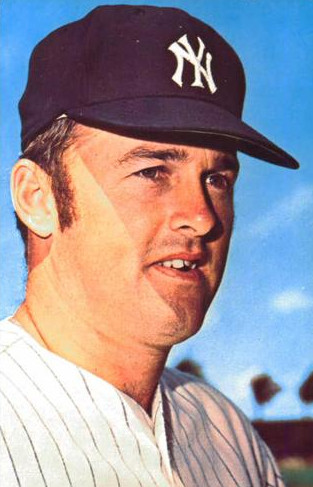
- Cater in 1970
- First baseman / Outfielder
- Born: February 25, 1940 (age 86); Austin, Texas, U.S.
- Batted: Right Threw: Right

MLB debut
- April 14, 1964, for the Philadelphia Phillies

Last MLB appearance
- June 11, 1975, for the St. Louis Cardinals

MLB statistics
- Batting average: .276
- Home runs: 66
- Runs batted in: 519
- Stats at Baseball Reference

Teams
- Philadelphia Phillies (1964); Chicago White Sox (1965–1966); Kansas City / Oakland Athletics (1966–1969); New York Yankees (1970–1971); Boston Red Sox (1972–1974); St. Louis Cardinals (1975)

Danny Anderson Cater (born February 25, 1940) is an American former professional baseball first baseman, third baseman, outfielder, and designated hitter. He signed with the Philadelphia Phillies at the age of 18, on June 8, 1958. Cater played in Major League Baseball (MLB) for the Phillies (1964), Chicago White Sox (1965–1966), Kansas City / Oakland Athletics (1966–1969), New York Yankees (1970–1971), Boston Red Sox (1972–1974), and St. Louis Cardinals (1975).

== Career ==
Cater played twelve seasons in the big leagues, mostly as a regular. For the eight-year period from 1965 to 1972, he averaged over 500 plate appearances per season. Cater was a good hitter who was tough to strike out; however, he was slow afoot, making him more likely to ground into double plays, finishing in the top ten in the league in that category six times in those eight years, including second in both in 1968 and 1969.

Cater finished second for the American League batting title in 1968 with a batting average of .290. That year is called "The Year of the Pitcher", and Carl Yastrzemski won the batting crown with a .301 batting average, the lowest mark ever to win a major league batting championship. Cater also led all American League first basemen with a .995 fielding percentage, that season. In 1972, the Yankees traded Cater and Mario Guerrero to the Boston Red Sox for Sparky Lyle.

Cater‘s career highlights included:

- a pair of 5-hit games: five singles vs. the Cleveland Indians (August 30, 1967); and a double and four singles vs. the Boston Red Sox (June 21, 1970)
- eighteen 4-hit games, with the most impressive being two singles, a double, and a home run good for 4 runs batted in and 4 runs scored vs. the California Angels (August 12, 1973)

Cater's career totals include 1,289 games played, 1,229 hits, 66 home runs, 519 runs batted in, and a .276 batting average.

== Post-playing career ==
After retiring from baseball, Cater worked at the headquarters office of the Texas Comptroller of Public Accounts in Austin, Texas. He now lives in Plano, Texas.
