= 1970 Minnesota Twins season =

1970 Minnesota Twins
- American League West champions
- League: American League
- Division: West
- Ballpark: Metropolitan Stadium
- City: Bloomington, Minnesota
- Record: 98–64 (.605)
- Divisional place: 1st
- Owners: Calvin Griffith (majority owner, with Thelma Griffith Haynes)
- General managers: Calvin Griffith
- Managers: Bill Rigney
- Television: WTCN-TV
- Radio: 830 WCCO AM (Herb Carneal, Halsey Hall, Al Shaver, Ray Christensen, Frank Buetel)

The 1970 Minnesota Twins season was the 10th season for the Minnesota Twins franchise in the Twin Cities of Minnesota, their 10th season at Metropolitan Stadium and the 70th overall in the American League.

Led by new manager Bill Rigney, the Twins won the American League West with a 98–64 record, nine games ahead of the Oakland Athletics. The Twins were swept by the Baltimore Orioles in the ALCS. Of note, the Twins were the only team in the American League to have a winning record in the regular season versus the Orioles. The 1970 ALCS would be the last MLB postseason games played at Metropolitan Stadium, as the Twins would not return to the postseason stage until 1987 when they won the World Series.

== Offseason ==
- October 13, 1969: John Roseboro was released by the Twins.
- December 1, 1969: 1969 rule 5 draft
  - Mike Sadek was drafted from the Twins by the San Francisco Giants.
  - Hal Haydel was drafted by the Twins from the San Francisco Giants.
- December 10, 1969: Graig Nettles, Dean Chance, Bob Miller, and Ted Uhlaender were traded by the Twins to the Cleveland Indians for Luis Tiant and Stan Williams.
- March 21, 1970: Joe Grzenda and Charley Walters were traded by the Twins to the Washington Senators for Brant Alyea.

== Regular season ==
On April 7, newly acquired Twin Brant Alyea homered twice in going 4 for 4 and driving in 7 RBIs. The RBI total set a record for major league baseball's Opening Day.

On May 20, in a 10–5 win over the Kansas City Royals, Rod Carew became the first Twin to hit for the cycle—going single, homer, double, triple. Over time, his feat will be matched by nine other Twins (César Tovar, 1972; Larry Hisle, 1976; Lyman Bostock, 1976; Mike Cubbage, 1978; Gary Ward, 1980; Kirby Puckett, 1986; Carlos Gómez, 2008; Jason Kubel, 2009; and Michael Cuddyer, 2009).

On June 5, pitcher Bert Blyleven debuted, allowing a home run off the first batter he faced.

Four Twins made the All-Star Game: first baseman Harmon Killebrew, second baseman Rod Carew, outfielder Tony Oliva, and pitcher Jim Perry.

On September 16, Blyleven struck out the first six batters he faced to tie a major league record. However, the Twins lost the game to the California Angels, 5–1.

The Twins are no-hit for the second time in their history, losing 6–0 to Oakland's Vida Blue.

The Twins won the American League West, led by leadoff batter César Tovar (120 runs), Oliva (.325, 23 HR, 107 RBI) and Killebrew (41 HR, 113 RBI). Carew was batting .366 (after 51 games) when his knee was injured turning a double play. Perry won 24 games and became the first Twins pitcher to win the AL Cy Young Award. Jim Kaat added 14 wins and rookie Bert Blyleven won 10. Kaat also won his 9th Gold Glove Award. Reliever Ron Perranoski led the AL with 34 saves.

1,261,887 fans attended Twins games, the third highest total in the American League.

=== Season standings ===
AL West
Team	W	L	Pct.	GB	Home	Road
Minnesota Twins	98	64	.605	—	51‍–‍30	47‍–‍34
Oakland Athletics	89	73	.549	9	49‍–‍32	40‍–‍41
California Angels	86	76	.531	12	43‍–‍38	43‍–‍38
Kansas City Royals	65	97	.401	33	35‍–‍44	30‍–‍53
Milwaukee Brewers	65	97	.401	33	38‍–‍42	27‍–‍55
Chicago White Sox	56	106	.346	42	31‍–‍53	25‍–‍53

=== Record vs. opponents ===
1970 American League record Sources:
Team	BAL	BOS	CAL	CWS	CLE	DET	KC	MIL	MIN	NYY	OAK	WAS
Baltimore	—	13–5	7–5	9–3	14–4	11–7	12–0	7–5	5–7	11–7	7–5	12–6
Boston	5–13	—	5–7	8–4	12–6	9–9	7–5	5–7	7–5	10–8	7–5	12–6
California	5–7	7–5	—	12–6	6–6	6–6	10–8	12–6	8–10	5–7	8–10	7–5
Chicago	3–9	4–8	6–12	—	6–6	6–6	7–11	7–11	6–12	5–7	2–16	4–8
Cleveland	4–14	6–12	6–6	6–6	—	7–11	8–4	7–5	6–6	8–10	7–5	11–7
Detroit	7–11	9–9	6–6	6–6	11–7	—	6–6	8–4	4–8	7–11	6–6	9–9
Kansas City	0–12	5–7	8–10	11–7	4–8	6–6	—	12–6	5–13	1–11	7–11	6–6
Milwaukee	5–7	7–5	6–12	11–7	5–7	4–8	6–12	—	5–13	3–9–1	8–10	5–7
Minnesota	7–5	5–7	10–8	12–6	6–6	8–4	13–5	13–5	—	5–7	13–5	6–6
New York	7–11	8–10	7–5	7–5	10–8	11–7	11–1	9–3–1	7–5	—	6–6	10–8
Oakland	5–7	5–7	10–8	16–2	5–7	6–6	11–7	10–8	5–13	6–6	—	10–2
Washington	6–12	6–12	5–7	8–4	7–11	9–9	6–6	7–5	6–6	8–10	2–10	—

=== Notable transactions ===
- June 27, 1970: Craig Kusick was signed as an amateur free agent by the Twins.

=== Roster ===
1970 Minnesota Twins
Roster
Pitchers: 24 Steve Barber; 28 Bert Blyleven; 23 Dave Boswell; 21 Tom Hall; 34 Pete Hamm; 30 Hal Haydel; 36 Jim Kaat; 16 Ron Perranoski; 31 Jim Perry; 33 Luis Tiant; 35 Stan Williams; 32 Dick Woodson; 25 Bill Zepp	Catchers: 38 Rick Dempsey; 15 George Mitterwald; 8 Paul Ratliff; 22 Tom Tischinski; Infielders: 5,17 Leo Cárdenas; 29 Rod Carew; 3 Harmon Killebrew; 27 Minnie Mendoza; 40 Cotton Nash; 7 Frank Quilici; 20 Rich Reese; 10 Rick Renick; 55,5 Danny Thompson	Outfielders: 4 Bob Allison; 11 Brant Alyea; 37 Steve Brye; 19 Herman Hill; 26 Jim Holt; 9 Charlie Manuel; 34,39 Jim Nettles; 6 Tony Oliva; 12 César Tovar	Manager: 18 Bill Rigney; Coaches: 2 Frankie Crosetti; 46 Marv Grissom; 44 Vern Morgan; 47 Sherry Robertson; 45 Buck Rodgers

== Player stats ==
= Indicates team leader

=== Batting ===
==== Starters by position ====
Note: Pos = Position; G = Games played; AB = At bats; H = Hits; Avg. = Batting average; HR = Home runs; RBI = Runs batted in

Pos	Player	G	AB	H	Avg.	HR	RBI
C	George Mitterwald	117	369	82	.222	15	46
1B	Rich Reese	153	501	131	.261	10	56
2B	Danny Thompson	96	302	66	.219	0	22
3B	Harmon Killebrew	157	527	143	.271	41	113
SS	Leo Cárdenas	160	588	145	.247	11	65
LF	Brant Alyea	94	258	75	.291	16	61
CF	César Tovar	161	650	195	.300	10	54
RF	Tony Oliva	157	628	204	.325	23	107

==== Other batters ====
Note: G = Games played; AB = At bats; H = Hits; Avg. = Batting average; HR = Home runs; RBI = Runs batted in

Player	G	AB	H	Avg.	HR	RBI
Jim Holt	142	319	85	.266	3	40
Rod Carew	51	191	70	.366	4	28
Rick Renick	81	179	41	.229	7	25
Paul Ratliff	69	149	40	.268	5	22
Frank Quilici	111	141	32	.227	2	12
Bob Allison	47	72	15	.208	1	7
Charlie Manuel	59	64	12	.188	1	7
Tom Tischinski	24	46	9	.196	1	2
Herman Hill	27	22	2	.091	0	0
Jim Nettles	13	20	5	.250	0	0
Minnie Mendoza	16	16	3	.188	0	2
Steve Brye	9	11	2	.182	0	2
Rick Dempsey	5	7	0	.000	0	0
Cotton Nash	4	4	1	.250	0	2

=== Pitching ===
= Indicates league leader

==== Starting pitchers ====
Note: G = Games pitched; IP = Innings pitched; W = Wins; L = Losses; ERA = Earned run average; SO = Strikeouts

Player	G	IP	W	L	ERA	SO
Jim Perry	40	278.2	24*	12	3.04	168
Jim Kaat	45	230.0	14	10	3.56	120
Bert Blyleven	27	164.0	10	9	3.18	135
Luis Tiant	18	92.2	7	3	3.40	50
Dave Boswell	18	68.2	3	7	6.42	45

- Tied with Mike Cuellar and Dave McNally (both with Baltimore) for league lead

==== Other pitchers ====
Note: G = Games pitched; IP = Innings pitched; W = Wins; L = Losses; ERA = Earned run average; SO = Strikeouts

Player	G	IP	W	L	ERA	SO
Tom Hall	52	155.1	11	6	2.55	184
Bill Zepp	43	151.0	9	4	3.22	64

==== Relief pitchers ====
Note: G = Games pitched; W = Wins; L = Losses; SV = Saves; ERA = Earned run average; SO = Strikeouts

Player	G	W	L	SV	ERA	SO
Ron Perranoski	67	7	8	34	2.43	55
Stan Williams	68	10	1	15	1.99	76
Dick Woodson	21	1	2	1	3.82	22
Steve Barber	18	0	0	2	4.61	14
Pete Hamm	10	0	2	0	5.51	3
Hal Haydel	4	2	0	0	3.00	4

== Awards and honors ==
- Jim Perry, American League Cy Young Award

== Farm system ==
Level	Team	League	Manager
AAA	Evansville Triplets	American Association	Ralph Rowe
AA	Charlotte Hornets	Southern League	Harry Warner and Pete Appleton
A	Lynchburg Twins	Carolina League	Tom Umphlett and Spencer "Red" Robbins
A	Orlando Twins	Florida State League	Jackie Ferrell
A	Wisconsin Rapids Twins	Midwest League	Johnny Goryl
A-Short Season	Auburn Twins	New York–Penn League	Boyd Coffie
A-Short Season	St. Cloud Rox	Northern League	Jim Merrick
Rookie	GCL Twins	Gulf Coast League	Fred Waters

LEAGUE CHAMPIONS: Auburn
