= 1968 Minnesota Twins season =

1968 Minnesota Twins
- League: American League
- Ballpark: Metropolitan Stadium
- City: Bloomington, Minnesota
- Record: 79–83 (.488)
- Divisional place: 7th
- Owners: Calvin Griffith (majority owner, with Thelma Griffith Haynes)
- General managers: Calvin Griffith
- Managers: Cal Ermer
- Television: WTCN-TV
- Radio: 830 WCCO AM (Herb Carneal, Halsey Hall, Merle Harmon)

The 1968 Minnesota Twins season was the 8th season for the Minnesota Twins franchise in the Twin Cities of Minnesota, their 8th season at Metropolitan Stadium and the 68th overall in the American League. The team finished 79–83, seventh in the American League.

== Offseason ==
- January 27, 1968: Eric Soderholm was drafted by the Twins in the 1st round (1st pick) of the secondary phase of the 1968 Major League Baseball draft.

== Regular season ==
Leadoff batter César Tovar sparked the offense, finishing second in the American League (AL) with 167 hits and third with 89 runs. Tony Oliva was third in the AL with a .289 batting average. Harmon Killebrew had 17 HR and 40 RBI at the All-Star break but was injured in the All-Star Game and missed most of the second half of the season.

It took until their eighth season for the Twins to get no-hit and then it happened profoundly, as their first opposing no-hitter was the perfect game thrown by Oakland's Catfish Hunter on May 8 in Oakland. Hunter struck out 11 and drove in three of his team's four runs.

A first for the Twins: on July 11, Rick Renick played his first-ever major league game, at shortstop. In his first big-league at bat, he homered. The run came off Detroit Tigers pitcher Mickey Lolich. Renick is the first Twins player to accomplish the feat, later to be joined in history by Dave McKay (1975), Gary Gaetti (1981), Andre David (1984), and Eddie Rosario (2015), who hit a homer not only in his first at bat, but on the first major-league pitch thrown to him.

Three Twins made the All-Star Game: Killebrew, Oliva, and second baseman Rod Carew.

On September 22, utility player César Tovar played all nine positions, an inning each, against the Oakland Athletics. Duplicating the feat that Bert Campaneris had performed three years prior, Tovar topped Campy by starting as pitcher and allowing no hits or runs. In the inning, the first batter Tovar faced was Campaneris, who fouled out. Tovar then struck out slugger Reggie Jackson.

Four Twins won 10 or more games: Dean Chance (16–16), Jim Kaat (14–12) Jim Merritt (12–16), Dave Boswell (10–13). Kaat won his seventh Gold Glove. Al Worthington led the AL with 18 saves.

1,143,257 fans attended Twins games, the fourth highest total in the AL.

=== Season standings ===
American League
Team	W	L	Pct.	GB	Home	Road
Detroit Tigers	103	59	.636	—	56‍–‍25	47‍–‍34
Baltimore Orioles	91	71	.562	12	47‍–‍33	44‍–‍38
Cleveland Indians	86	75	.534	16½	43‍–‍37	43‍–‍38
Boston Red Sox	86	76	.531	17	46‍–‍35	40‍–‍41
New York Yankees	83	79	.512	20	39‍–‍42	44‍–‍37
Oakland Athletics	82	80	.506	21	44‍–‍38	38‍–‍42
Minnesota Twins	79	83	.488	24	41‍–‍40	38‍–‍43
California Angels	67	95	.414	36	32‍–‍49	35‍–‍46
Chicago White Sox	67	95	.414	36	36‍–‍45	31‍–‍50
Washington Senators	65	96	.404	37½	34‍–‍47	31‍–‍49

=== Record vs. opponents ===
1968 American League record Sources:
Team	BAL	BOS	CAL	CWS	CLE	DET	MIN	NYY	OAK	WAS
Baltimore	—	9–9	10–8	11–7	7–11	8–10	10–8	13–5	9–9	14–4
Boston	9–9	—	9–9	14–4	10–8	6–12	9–9	10–8	8–10	11–7
California	8–10	9–9	—	8–10	7–11	5–13	7–11	6–12	5–13	12–6
Chicago	7–11	4–14	10–8	—	5–13	5–13	10–8	6–12	10–8	10–8
Cleveland	11–7	8–10	11–7	13–5	—	6–12	14–4	10–8–1	6–12	7–10
Detroit	10–8	12–6	13–5	13–5	12–6	—	10–8	10–8–1	13–5–1	10–8
Minnesota	8–10	9–9	11–7	8–10	4–14	8–10	—	12–6	8–10	11–7
New York	5–13	8–10	12–6	12–6	8–10–1	8–10–1	6–12	—	10–8	14–4
Oakland	9–9	10–8	13–5	8–10	12–6	5–13–1	10–8	8–10	—	7–11
Washington	4–14	7–11	6–12	8–10	10–7	8–10	7–11	4–14	11–7	—

=== Roster ===
1968 Minnesota Twins
Roster
Pitchers: 23 Dave Boswell; 32 Dean Chance; 18 Tom Hall; 36 Jim Kaat; 38 Ron Keller; 26 Jim Merritt; 21,49 Bob Miller; 27 Danny Morris; 16 Ron Perranoski; 31 Jim Perry; 19 Jim Roland; 42 Buzz Stephen; 15 Al Worthington	Catchers: 25 Bruce Look; 34 George Mitterwald; 10,13 John Roseboro; 22 Jerry Zimmerman; Infielders: 29 Rod Carew; 8 Ron Clark; 24 Jackie Hernández; 3 Harmon Killebrew; 7 Frank Quilici; 20 Rich Reese; 10 Rick Renick; 9 Rich Rollins	Outfielders: 4 Bob Allison; 45 Jim Holt; 25 Pat Kelly; 2 Frank Kostro; 28 Graig Nettles; 6 Tony Oliva; 12 César Tovar; 11 Ted Uhlaender	Manager: 43 Cal Ermer; Coaches: 46 George Case; 48 Johnny Goryl; 1 Billy Martin; 5 Bob Oldis; 47 Early Wynn

== Player stats ==
= Indicates team leader

=== Batting ===
==== Starters by position ====
Note: Pos = Position; G = Games played; AB = At bats; H = Hits; Avg. = Batting average; HR = Home runs; RBI = Runs batted in

Pos	Player	G	AB	H	Avg.	HR	RBI
C	John Roseboro	135	380	82	.216	8	39
1B	Harmon Killebrew	100	295	62	.210	17	40
2B	Rod Carew	127	461	126	.273	1	42
SS	Jackie Hernández	83	199	35	.176	2	17
3B	César Tovar	157	613	167	.272	6	47
LF	Bob Allison	145	469	116	.247	22	52
CF	Ted Uhlaender	140	488	138	.283	7	52
RF	Tony Oliva	128	470	136	.289	18	68

==== Other batters ====
Note: G = Games played; AB = At bats; H = Hits; Avg. = Batting average; HR = Home runs; RBI = Runs batted in

Player	G	AB	H	Avg.	HR	RBI
Rich Reese	126	332	86	.259	4	28
Frank Quilici	97	229	56	.245	1	22
Ron Clark	104	227	42	.185	1	13
Rich Rollins	93	203	49	.241	6	30
Bruce Look	59	118	29	.246	0	9
Frank Kostro	63	108	26	.241	0	9
Jim Holt	70	106	22	.208	0	8
Rick Renick	42	97	21	.216	3	13
Graig Nettles	22	76	17	.224	5	8
Jerry Zimmerman	24	45	5	.111	0	2
Pat Kelly	12	35	4	.114	1	2
George Mitterwald	11	34	7	.206	0	1

=== Pitching ===
==== Starting pitchers ====
Note: G = Games pitched; IP = Innings pitched; W = Wins; L = Losses; ERA = Earned run average; SO = Strikeouts

Player	G	IP	W	L	ERA	SO
Dean Chance	43	292.0	16	16	2.53	234
Jim Merritt	38	238.1	12	16	3.25	181
Jim Kaat	30	208.0	14	12	2.94	130
Dave Boswell	34	190.0	10	13	3.32	143
Buzz Stephen	2	11.1	1	1	4.76	4
César Tovar	1	1.0	0	0	0.00	1

==== Other pitchers ====
Note: G = Games pitched; IP = Innings pitched; W = Wins; L = Losses; ERA = Earned run average; SO = Strikeouts

Player	G	IP	W	L	ERA	SO
Jim Perry	32	139.0	8	6	2.27	69
Jim Roland	28	61.2	4	1	3.50	36
Tom Hall	8	29.2	2	1	2.43	18
Ron Keller	7	16.0	0	1	1.69	11
Danny Morris	3	10.2	0	1	1.69	6

==== Relief pitchers ====
Note: G = Games pitched; W = Wins; L = Losses; SV = Saves; ERA = Earned run average; SO = Strikeouts

Player	G	W	L	SV	ERA	SO
Al Worthington	54	4	5	18	2.71	57
Ron Perranoski	66	8	7	6	3.10	65
Bob Miller	45	0	3	2	2.74	41

== Farm system ==
Level	Team	League	Manager
AAA	Denver Bears	Pacific Coast League	Johnny Goryl and Billy Martin
AA	Charlotte Hornets	Southern League	Harry Warner
A	Wilson Tobs	Carolina League	Vern Morgan
A	Orlando Twins	Florida State League	Ralph Rowe
A	Wisconsin Rapids Twins	Midwest League	Ray Bellino and Tom Umphlett
A-Short Season	Auburn Twins	New York–Penn League	Boyd Coffie
A-Short Season	St. Cloud Rox	Northern League	Carroll Hardy
Rookie	GCL Twins	Gulf Coast League	Fred Waters

League champions: Orlando, St. Cloud
