= 1969 Minnesota Twins season =

1969 Minnesota Twins
- American League West champions
- League: American League
- Division: West
- Ballpark: Metropolitan Stadium
- City: Bloomington, Minnesota
- Record: 97–65 (.599)
- Divisional place: 1st
- Owners: Calvin Griffith (majority owner, with Thelma Griffith Haynes)
- General managers: Calvin Griffith
- Managers: Billy Martin
- Television: WTCN-TV
- Radio: 830 WCCO AM (Herb Carneal, Halsey Hall, Merle Harmon)

The 1969 Minnesota Twins season was the 9th season for the Minnesota Twins franchise in the Twin Cities of Minnesota, their 9th season at Metropolitan Stadium and the 69th overall in the American League.

Led by new manager Billy Martin, the Twins won the newly formed American League West with a 97–65 record, nine games over the second-place Oakland Athletics. The Twins were swept by the Baltimore Orioles in the first ALCS.

== Regular season ==
In the first year of divisional play, the Twins won the American League West, led by Rod Carew (.332, his first AL batting title), Tony Oliva (.309, 24 HR, 101 RBI) and league MVP Harmon Killebrew (49 HR, 140 RBI – both league-leading totals). Carew stole home 7 times. Leadoff batter César Tovar was third in the AL with 45 stolen bases. Jim Perry and Dave Boswell each won 20 games, the first and only time a Minnesota club has held two 20-game winners. Reliever Ron Perranoski became the first Twin to lead the AL in saves with 31. Pitcher Jim Kaat won his 8th Gold Glove Award.

In the May 18 loss to Detroit, the Twins stole five bases during the third inning to tie a major league record. Four bases were stolen during Harmon Killebrew's at-bat: César Tovar stole home, and Rod Carew stole second, third and then home.

On June 21 in Oakland, the Twins were tied 3–3 with the A's going into the tenth inning. In the top of the inning, Minnesota scored eleven times, tying a 1928 New York Yankees record. The Twins won the game 14–4.

On September 20, the Twins were at least able to clinch a playoff spot at home by beating the Seattle Pilots 3-2 on a walk-off double by Tony Oliva that brought in Rod Carew who'd hit a single in the at-bat before. It would be 2 more days before they'd clinch the AL West outright as the Pilots upset the Twins the next day while the 2nd-place A's throttled the California Angels. On September 22, they went on the road to Kansas City and won over the expansion Royals 4-3 becoming the first team to win the division.

Four Twins made the All-Star Game: first baseman Killebrew, second baseman Carew, outfielder Oliva, and catcher John Roseboro. Harmon Killebrew became the second Twin to be named American League Most Valuable Player.

1,349,328 fans attended Twins games, the third highest total in the American League.

=== Season standings ===
AL West
Team	W	L	Pct.	GB	Home	Road
Minnesota Twins	97	65	.599	—	57‍–‍24	40‍–‍41
Oakland Athletics	88	74	.543	9	49‍–‍32	39‍–‍42
California Angels	71	91	.438	26	43‍–‍38	28‍–‍53
Kansas City Royals	69	93	.426	28	36‍–‍45	33‍–‍48
Chicago White Sox	68	94	.420	29	41‍–‍40	27‍–‍54
Seattle Pilots	64	98	.395	33	34‍–‍47	30‍–‍51

=== Record vs. opponents ===
1969 American League records Sources:
Team	BAL	BOS	CAL	CWS	CLE	DET	KC	MIN	NYY	OAK	SEA	WAS
Baltimore	—	10–8	6–6	9–3	13–5	11–7	11–1	8–4	11–7	8–4	9–3	13–5
Boston	8–10	—	8–4	5–7	12–6	10–8	10–2	7–5	11–7	4–8	6–6	6–12
California	6–6	4–8	—	9–9	8–4	5–7	9–9	7–11	3–9	6–12	9–9–1	5–7
Chicago	3–9	7–5	9–9	—	8–4	3–9	8–10	5–13	3–9	8–10	10–8	4–8
Cleveland	5–13	6–12	4–8	4–8	—	7–11	7–5	5–7	9–8	5–7	7–5	3–15
Detroit	7–11	8–10	7–5	9–3	11–7	—	8–4	6–6	10–8	7–5	10–2	7–11
Kansas City	1–11	2–10	9–9	10–8	5–7	4–8	—	8–10	5–7–1	8–10	10–8	7–5
Minnesota	4–8	5–7	11–7	13–5	7–5	6–6	10–8	—	10–2	13–5	12–6	6–6
New York	7–11	7–11	9–3	9–3	8–9	8–10	7–5–1	2–10	—	6–6	7–5	10–8
Oakland	4–8	8–4	12–6	10–8	7–5	5–7	10–8	5–13	6–6	—	13–5	8–4
Seattle	3–9	6–6	9–9–1	8–10	5–7	2–10	8–10	6–12	5–7	5–13	—	7–5
Washington	5–13	12–6	7–5	8–4	15–3	11–7	5–7	6–6	8–10	4–8	5–7	—

=== Notable transactions ===
- June 5, 1969: 1969 Major League Baseball draft
  - Bert Blyleven was drafted by the Twins in the 3rd round.
  - Jim Hughes was drafted by the Twins in the 33rd round.

=== Roster ===
1969 Minnesota Twins
Roster
Pitchers: 23 Dave Boswell; 24 Bucky Brandon; 32 Dean Chance; 27 Jerry Crider; 17,33 Joe Grzenda; 21 Tom Hall; 36 Jim Kaat; 49 Bob Miller; 27 Danny Morris; 16 Ron Perranoski; 31 Jim Perry; 27 Charlie Walters; 18,35 Dick Woodson; 19 Al Worthington; 25 Bill Zepp	Catchers: 8 Rick Dempsey; 15 George Mitterwald; 13 John Roseboro; 22 Tom Tischinski; Infielders: 5 Leo Cárdenas; 29 Rod Carew; 8 Ron Clark; 3 Harmon Killebrew; 34 Cotton Nash; 7 Frank Quilici; 20 Rich Reese; 10 Rick Renick	Outfielders: 4 Bob Allison; 28 Herman Hill; 26 Jim Holt; 9 Charlie Manuel; 2 Graig Nettles; 6 Tony Oliva; 12 César Tovar; 11 Ted Uhlaender; Other batters: 2 Frank Kostro	Manager: 1 Billy Martin; Coaches: 43 Art Fowler; 45 Johnny Goryl; 44 Vern Morgan; 46 Charlie Silvera; 47 Early Wynn

== Player stats ==
= Indicates team leader

= Indicates league leader

=== Batting ===
==== Starters by position ====
Note: Pos = Position; G = Games played; AB = At bats; H = Hits; Avg. = Batting average; HR = Home runs; RBI = Runs batted in

Pos	Player	G	AB	H	Avg.	HR	RBI
C	John Roseboro	115	361	95	.263	3	32
1B	Rich Reese	132	419	135	.322	16	69
2B	Rod Carew	123	458	152	.332	8	56
3B	Harmon Killebrew	162	555	153	.276	49	140
SS	Leo Cárdenas	160	578	162	.280	10	70
LF	Bob Allison	81	189	43	.228	8	29
CF	Ted Uhlaender	152	554	151	.273	8	62
RF	Tony Oliva	153	637	197	.309	24	101

==== Other batters ====
Note: G = Games played; AB = At bats; H = Hits; Avg. = Batting average; HR = Home runs; RBI = Runs batted in

Player	G	AB	H	Avg.	HR	RBI
César Tovar	158	535	154	.288	11	52
Graig Nettles	96	225	50	.222	7	26
George Mitterwald	69	187	48	.257	5	13
Charlie Manuel	83	164	34	.207	2	24
Frank Quilici	118	144	25	.174	2	12
Rick Renick	71	139	34	.254	5	17
Tom Tischinski	37	47	9	.191	0	2
Jim Holt	12	14	5	.357	1	2
Cotton Nash	6	9	2	.222	0	0
Ron Clark	5	8	1	.125	0	0
Rick Dempsey	5	6	3	.500	0	0
Frank Kostro	2	2	0	.000	0	0
Herman Hill	16	2	0	.000	0	0

=== Pitching ===
==== Starting pitchers ====
Note: G = Games pitched; IP = Innings pitched; W = Wins; L = Losses; ERA = Earned run average; SO = Strikeouts

Player	G	IP	W	L	ERA	SO
Jim Perry	46	261.2	20	6	2.82	153
Dave Boswell	39	256.1	20	12	3.23	190
Jim Kaat	40	242.1	14	13	3.49	139
Tom Hall	20	140.2	8	7	3.33	92
Dean Chance	20	88.1	5	4	2.95	50

==== Other pitchers ====
Note: G = Games pitched; IP = Innings pitched; W = Wins; L = Losses; ERA = Earned run average; SO = Strikeouts

Player	G	IP	W	L	ERA	SO
Bob Miller	48	119.1	5	5	3.02	57
Dick Woodson	44	110.1	7	5	3.67	66
Danny Morris	3	5.1	0	1	5.06	1

==== Relief pitchers ====
Note: G = Games pitched; W = Wins; L = Losses; SV = Saves; ERA = Earned run average; SO = Strikeouts

Player	G	W	L	SV	ERA	SO
Ron Perranoski	75	9	10	31	2.11	62
Al Worthington	46	9	10	3	4.57	51
Joe Grzenda	38	4	1	3	3.88	24
Jerry Crider	21	1	0	1	4.71	16
Charley Walters	6	0	0	0	5.40	2
Bill Zepp	4	0	0	0	6.75	2
Bucky Brandon	3	0	0	0	2.70	1

== Postseason ==
The Twins were swept 3–0 by the Baltimore Orioles in the 1969 American League Championship Series.

== Awards and honors ==
Recipient	Award
Rod Carew	All-Star starting 2B
Harmon Killebrew	All-Star reserve 1B
Tony Oliva	All-Star reserve OF (did not play due to injury)
John Roseboro	All-Star reserve C
Jim Kaat	AL Gold Glove Award P
Harmon Killebrew	AL Most Valuable Player

Along with MVP winner Killebrew, starting pitcher Jim Perry, Carew, shortstop Leo Cardenas, relief pitcher Ron Perranoski, Oliva, and utility man Cesar Tovar all received votes in American League MVP balloting, finishing in 9th, 10th, 12th, 13th, 15th and 17th place, respectively.

Perry finished in third place in American League Cy Young Award balloting.

== Farm system ==
Level	Team	League	Manager
AAA	Denver Bears	American Association	Don Heffner
AA	Charlotte Hornets	Southern League	Ralph Rowe
A	Red Springs Twins	Carolina League	Tom Umphlett
A	Orlando Twins	Florida State League	Harry Warner
A	Wisconsin Rapids Twins	Midwest League	Tom Videtich
A-Short Season	Auburn Twins	New York–Penn League	Steve Thornton
A-Short Season	St. Cloud Rox	Northern League	Jim Merrick
Rookie	GCL Twins	Gulf Coast League	Fred Waters

LEAGUE CHAMPIONS: Charlotte
