= Catfish Hunter's perfect game =

Ninth perfect game in MLB history

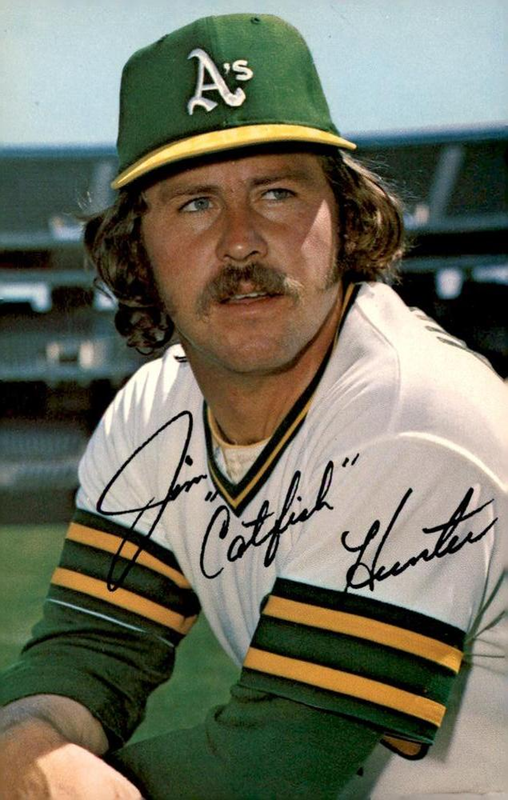
- Catfish Hunter pitched only the ninth perfect game in major league history.
Minnesota Twins	Oakland Athletics
0	4
	1	2	3	4	5	6	7	8	9	R	H	E
Minnesota Twins	0	0	0	0	0	0	0	0	0	0	0	1
Oakland Athletics	0	0	0	0	0	0	1	3	-	4	10	0
- Date: May 8, 1968
- Venue: Oakland–Alameda County Coliseum
- City: Oakland, California
- Managers: Cal Ermer (Minnesota Twins); Bob Kennedy (Oakland Athletics)
- Umpires: HP: Jerry Neudecker; 1B: Larry Napp; 2B: Al Salerno; 3B: Bill Haller
- Attendance: 6,298
- Time of game: 2:28

On May 8, 1968, Jim "Catfish" Hunter of the Oakland Athletics pitched the ninth perfect game in Major League Baseball history, defeating the Minnesota Twins 4–0 at Oakland–Alameda County Coliseum. The game was not televised.

Hunter struck out 11 batters, including the last two batters he faced: Bruce Look and pinch-hitter Rich Reese. He also struck out Harmon Killebrew all three times the two future Hall-of-Famers faced each other. Only two batters got to a three-ball count: Tony Oliva in the second inning, who reached a 3–0 count before striking out, and pinch hitter Reese, who fouled off five consecutive 3–2 pitches before striking out to end the game.

Hunter relied mostly on his fastball during the game, only disagreeing with catcher Jim Pagliaroni's pitch-calling decisions twice. As a measure of his appreciation for his catcher's contribution to the perfect game, Hunter rewarded Pagliaroni with a gold watch that he had inscribed on back. Only 6,298 fans showed up for the evening contest, which is the smallest attendance to watch any MLB perfect game.

The perfect game was the American League's first regular season perfect game since Charlie Robertson's perfect game in 1922, as well as the first no-hitter in the Athletics' Oakland history, which was in only its 25th game after the franchise had moved from Kansas City, Missouri, its home from 1955 to 1967. Bill McCahan had pitched the Athletics' last no-hitter in 1947; the franchise was then based in Philadelphia.

One of the best hitting pitchers of his time, Hunter went 3–4 at the plate, helping his own cause by batting in three of the four Oakland runs. In the bottom of the seventh inning, his bunt single scored Rick Monday to break a scoreless tie. One inning later, with the Athletics leading 2–0, he singled to score Pagliaroni and Monday.

As of 2017, Hunter is the youngest pitcher to pitch a modern-era perfect game, at 22 years, 30 days old.

== Boxscore ==
Team	1	2	3	4	5	6	7	8	9	R	H	E
Minnesota Twins (13–12)	0	0	0	0	0	0	0	0	0	0	0	1
Oakland Athletics (13–12)	0	0	0	0	0	0	1	3	x	4	10	0
WP: Catfish Hunter (3–2) LP: Dave Boswell (3–3)
