= César Tovar =

Venezuelan baseball player (1940–1994)

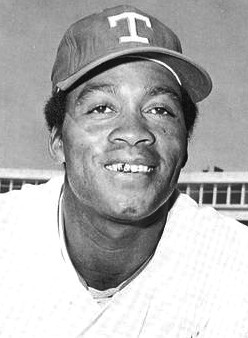
- Tovar in 1974
- Utility player
- Born: July 3, 1940; Caracas, Venezuela
- Died: July 14, 1994 (aged 54); Caracas, Venezuela
- Batted: Right Threw: Right

MLB debut
- April 12, 1965, for the Minnesota Twins

Last MLB appearance
- September 29, 1976, for the New York Yankees

MLB statistics
- Batting average: .278
- Home runs: 46
- Runs batted in: 435
- Stats at Baseball Reference

Teams
- Minnesota Twins (1965–1972); Philadelphia Phillies (1973); Texas Rangers (1974–1975); Oakland Athletics (1975–1976); New York Yankees (1976)

Career highlights and awards
- Minnesota Twins Hall of Fame

Member of the Venezuelan

Baseball Hall of Fame
- Induction: 2003

César Leonardo Tovar (July 3, 1940 – July 14, 1994), nicknamed "Pepito" and "Mr. Versatility", was a Venezuelan professional baseball player and coach. He played in Major League Baseball (MLB) from 1965 to 1976, most notably as the leadoff hitter for the Minnesota Twins teams that won two consecutive American League Western Division titles in 1969 and 1970. He later played for the Philadelphia Phillies, Texas Rangers, Oakland Athletics, and New York Yankees.

Although Tovar began his career as a second baseman, he was an extremely versatile utility player who could play any defensive position. In 1968, he became only the second player in MLB history to play all nine field positions during a single game, a feat first accomplished by Bert Campaneris, in 1965. Although he was a small player, listed at 5-feet-9 and 150 pounds, he was muscular and tough-bodied. Tovar played baseball with such speed and aggressiveness that manager Billy Martin considered him one of his favorite players. He was also a very good contact hitter, striking out only 7% of the time he appeared at the plate as a major league player. He led the American League (AL) in doubles (36) and in triples (13) in 1970, and in hits (204) in 1971.

Tovar also had a prolific career in the Venezuelan Professional Baseball League (VPBL), where he played 26 seasons – second only to the 30 seasons played by Vic Davalillo. He was inducted into the Venezuelan Sports Hall of Fame in 1996 and the Venezuelan Baseball Hall of Fame as part of its inaugural class in 2003. In 2022, Tovar was inducted into the Minnesota Twins Hall of Fame, and in 2024 he was inducted into the Caribbean Baseball Hall of Fame.

== Baseball playing career ==
=== Minor leagues ===
Tovar was born and raised in Caracas, Venezuela, where as a child, he shined shoes to earn extra income for his family. At the age of 15, he befriended Gus Gil, another Venezuelan who went on to play in Major League Baseball. In January 1959, Cincinnati Reds General Manager, Gabe Paul, attempted to sign Gil to a contract however, Gil insisted that Paul should also have Tovar sign a contract. Paul relented in order to make Gil agree to sign.

Tovar began his professional baseball career when he was assigned to the Geneva Redlegs in the New York–Penn League. He hit .252 in 87 games as an infielder for Geneva in 1959. That winter, he returned to Venezuela to play for the Leones del Caracas, and won the league's rookie of the year award.

In 1960, he played with the Missoula Timberjacks of the Pioneer League where he produced a promising .304 batting average along with 12 home runs and 68 runs batted in. After being selected to the league's All-Star team, he was rewarded by getting to play two games at the top level of the Reds' minor league system with the Seattle Rainiers. Tovar was sent back to Geneva in 1961, where he batted .338 with 19 home runs and 78 runs batted in. He stole 88 bases in 100 attempts to lead the league while setting a new league record for stolen bases. In 1962, he played for the Rocky Mount Leafs of the Carolina League, and led the league in batting with a .329 batting average along with 10 home runs and 78 runs batted in.

The Reds had a promising second baseman in Pete Rose, who would win the 1963 National League Rookie of the Year Award, with future Gold Glover Cookie Rojas on the bench and second basemen Bobby Klaus and Gus Gil in their minor league system, there was little room left for Tovar to progress. The Reds sent him on loan to play for the Minnesota Twins minor league affiliate, the Dallas-Fort Worth Rangers. Tovar first met his future manager Billy Martin at spring training in 1963 where Martin was working as a minor-league instructor. Martin took a liking to Tovar's aggressiveness on the base paths and took him under his wing. He also met future Hall of Fame member Tony Oliva in 1963 and the two became friends and later became roommates for seven years while playing for the Twins.

In 1964, Tovar returned to the Reds organization, where he played for the San Diego Padres of the Pacific Coast League. He helped the Padres win the league championship by hitting for a .275 average with 7 home runs and 52 runs batted in, while playing as a third baseman, shortstop, second baseman, and as an outfielder.

=== Minnesota Twins ===
Before the start of the 1965 season, the Twins traded pitcher Gerry Arrigo to the Reds for Tovar. The Twins had originally sought to get Tommy Helms from the Reds, but they refused to trade him and the Twins settled for Tovar. At the age of 24, Tovar made his major league debut on April 12, 1965, becoming the ninth Venezuelan to play in Major League Baseball. At that time, the only other Venezuelan players in MLB were Luis Aparicio and Vic Davalillo. However, he would soon be sent back to the minor leagues with the Denver Bears, where he hit for a .328 average. Tovar received a September call-up and played in a total of 18 games in the season however, he would be left off the postseason roster and would watch the Twins' seven-game World Series loss to the Los Angeles Dodgers from home.

The peak of Tovar's playing career came between 1966 and 1972. Starting in 1966, the Twins began to make ample use of Tovar's ability to play a variety of defensive positions. Although he was known as a utility player, he averaged 153 games per year during his tenure with the Twins. As a leadoff hitter, he averaged 92 runs scored a year while batting ahead of power hitters Tony Oliva and Harmon Killebrew in the Twins' batting order.

When rookie second baseman Rod Carew arrived in 1967, the Twins began to use Tovar predominately as an outfielder and a third baseman. The 1967 season was memorable for the tight, four-way pennant race between the Twins, the Boston Red Sox, the Detroit Tigers, and the Chicago White Sox, with all four teams still in contention entering the final week of the season. The Twins were in first place with two games left in the season, but lost their final two games to the Red Sox and finished the season in second place.

Tovar played an integral role as a utility player during the Twins' 1967 pennant run, dividing his playing time between third base (70 games), center field (64), second baseman (36), left field (10), shortstop (9) and right field (5). He set an American League record of 164 games played (the Twins had two tie games in the 1967 season) and led the league with 726 plate appearances and 649 at-bats. He was also among the top 10 batters in runs, hits, doubles, triples, stolen bases, hit by pitch and sacrifice hits. At the end of the 1967 season, the Triple Crown winner, Carl Yastrzemski, received all but one vote for the American League Most Valuable Player Award; the lone dissenting ballot (cast by Minneapolis Star sports writer Max Nichols) was marked in favor of Tovar, who would finish 7th in the MVP voting.

On September 22, 1968, Tovar became the second player after Bert Campaneris (Kansas City Athletics, 1965) to play all nine fielding positions in a game. The two were later joined by Scott Sheldon (Texas Rangers, 2000), Shane Halter (Detroit Tigers, 2000), and Andrew Romine (Detroit Tigers, 2017) as the only five players in MLB history to have accomplished the feat. Tovar started the game on the mound against Oakland and pitched one scoreless inning in which he struck out Reggie Jackson. As fate would have it, the first batter he faced was Campaneris.

“The little guy can beat you so many ways – his bat, his feet, his brains, his hustle.”

— Billy Martin

Billy Martin became the Twins manager in 1969 and he extolled Tovar's leadership and motivation among his teammates. During a game against the Detroit Tigers on May 18, 1969, Tovar combined with Rod Carew to set a major league record for most steals by a club in one inning with five. In the third inning against the Detroit battery of Mickey Lolich and Bill Freehan, Tovar stole third base and home. Carew followed by stealing second base, third base and home. The two steals of home in the same inning also tied a record. He ended the year with a career-high 45 stolen bases. Tovar returned to Venezuela during the off-season to play for the Navegantes del Magallanes team that won the 1969-1970 Venezuelan Professional Baseball League title and went on to win the 1970 Caribbean Series, marking the first time a Venezuelan team had won the tournament since its inception in 1949.

In 1970, Tovar ended the season with a .300 batting average and posted career highs in doubles (36), triples (13), runs (120), on-base percentage (.356), slugging percentage (.442), and on-base plus slugging (.798). His 36 doubles and 13 triples led the American League and his 120 runs scored ranked second behind Carl Yastrzemski (125). His 195 hits ranked third in the league behind teammate Tony Oliva (204) and Alex Johnson (202) of the California Angels.

The Twins won the American League Western Division title in both 1969 and 1970, but each time were swept in three games by the Baltimore Orioles during the play-offs. Tovar hit for only a .077 batting average in the 1969 American League Championship Series, but improved with a .385 average and scored two runs in the 1970 American League Championship Series.

As he improved at the plate, Tovar also moved less around the diamond – playing primarily center field in 1970, left field in 1971, and right field in 1972. He improved his hitting through 1971, when he hit for a .311 batting average and led the league with a career-high 204 hits, the highest one-year total by a Venezuelan player in MLB until Magglio Ordóñez had 216 hits in 2007.

In 1971, SPORT magazine polled major league players to identify the game's most competitive player. Pete Rose won; the runners-up were Frank Robinson, Bob Gibson, and César Tovar. On September 19, 1972, Tovar hit a walk-off home run to hit for the cycle. Only five other players in major league baseball history have completed a cycle with a game-ending homer: Ken Boyer (1961), George Brett (1979), Dwight Evans (1984), Carlos González (2010) and Nolan Arenado (2017).

=== Later career ===
After a subpar season in 1972, the Twins traded Tovar to the Philadelphia Phillies for Ken Sanders, Ken Reynolds and Joe Lis on December 1. Tovar would then spend the 1973 season platooning with a young Mike Schmidt at third base.

When Billy Martin became the manager of the Texas Rangers in 1973, he requested that the team purchase Tovar's contract from the Phillies, which they did on December 7, 1973. Tovar's career experienced a brief resurgence as Martin's leadoff hitter for the Rangers in 1974, hitting .292 with a .354 on-base percentage. After the Rangers released Martin in July 1975, they sold Tovar's contract to the Oakland Athletics in August 1975.

The Athletics were in first place in the American League Western Division and went on to win the division title. Tovar appeared in two games of the 1975 American League Championship Series, getting one hit in two at-bats and scoring two runs. He was a pinch hitter and defensive replacement for the Athletics in 1976, before breaking his wrist while making a diving catch on May 31. He was activated in mid-August, only after a complaint from the Major League Baseball Players Association. The Athletics' temperamental owner, Charlie Finley, then released Tovar on August 25.

Less than one week after being released by the Athletics, Tovar was signed as a free agent by the New York Yankees on September 1, once again with the assistance of Billy Martin who was then the Yankees manager. His signing made him the first Venezuelan to play for the Yankees. He appeared in 13 games for them before playing in his final major league game on September 29, 1976, at the age of 35. He joined the club too late to be eligible for the postseason. The Yankees released him in December 1976.

== Career statistics ==
In his 12-year major league career, Tovar played in 1,448 games with 1,546 hits in 5,569 at bats for a .278 batting average along with 46 home runs, 435 RBI, 834 runs, 253 doubles, 55 triples, 226 stolen bases and a .335 on-base percentage.

Along with former Reds center fielder Eddie Milner, Tovar is regarded as the major league's all-time leader in breaking up no-hit attempts with five. On April 30, 1967, Tovar's single was the only hit against the Washington Senators' Barry Moore. On May 15, 1969, he broke up the no-hit bid of Baltimore pitcher, Dave McNally. Later that same season on August 10, 1969, Mike Cuellar of the Baltimore Orioles extended his streak of consecutive batters retired to 35 before surrendering a ninth-inning single to Tovar, which also broke up Cuellar's bid for a no-hitter. Tovar was responsible for spoiling two other no-hitters during his career: against the Washington's Dick Bosman (August 13, 1970) and the Yankees' Jim "Catfish" Hunter (May 31, 1975). He had the opportunity to break up a sixth no-hitter, but recorded the last out in Vida Blue’s no-hitter on September 21, 1970.

== Later life ==
After retiring from the major leagues, Tovar played in the Mexican League where he hit .345 in 121 games for the Pericos de Puebla. In 1978, he appeared in only 31 games for the Olmecas de Tabasco with a .336 batting average. In 1979, Tovar played in the short-lived Inter-American League for the Caracas Metropolitanos and hit .285 for manager Jim Busby.

Tovar also continued to play in the Venezuelan Winter League. He was a player-coach for the Águilas del Zulia team that won the 1984 league championship before going on to win the 1984 Caribbean Series. He retired as a player at the age of 45 after two final games in the winter of 1985–86. Over a 26-season career in the Venezuelan Professional Baseball League, Tovar appeared in 1,116 games posting a .286 batting average, along with 23 home runs and 399 runs batted in. His 1,224 career hits and 1,116 games played ranks fourth in league history. As of 2014, he ranked second in runs scored (635) and stolen bases (146), and third in doubles (191).

After his playing career, Tovar continued to serve with the Águilas del Zulia as a coach where his protégé was future MLB player, Carlos Quintana who called him his "second father". He helped support children's charities in Venezuela by collecting baseball uniforms and equipment. He also worked as a softball coach for the Venezuelan Horse Racing Authority, which sponsored recreation for its workers and their families. In August 1990, he was a coach on the Venezuelan team at the Baseball World Cup, which was held in Edmonton, Alberta, Canada, under manager Domingo Carrasquel.

Tovar died on July 14, 1994, of pancreatic cancer in Caracas at age 54. The level of pride and admiration with which the Venezuelan public held for Tovar's playing career was such that the nation's president, Rafael Caldera, attended his funeral. He was inducted into the Venezuelan Sports Hall of Fame in 1996 and the Venezuelan Baseball Hall of Fame in 2003 as part of its inaugural class. Tovar was posthumously inducted into the Minnesota Twins Hall of Fame in 2022.

== Related links ==
- List of Major League Baseball annual doubles leaders
- List of Major League Baseball annual triples leaders
- List of Major League Baseball career stolen bases leaders
- List of Major League Baseball players to hit for the cycle
- List of Major League Baseball players from Venezuela

Achievements
Preceded by Bobby Murcer	Hitting for the cycle September 19, 1972	Succeeded by Joe Torre
