= Dean Look =

American football and baseball player (born 1937)

No. 30
- Position: Quarterback

Personal information
- Born: July 23, 1937 (age 89); Lansing, Michigan, U.S.
- Listed height: 5 ft 11 in (1.80 m)
- Listed weight: 185 lb (84 kg)

Career information
- High school: Everett (Lansing)
- College: Michigan State
- NFL draft: 1960: 20th round, 231st overall pick
- AFL draft: 1960: 1st round

Career history
- New York Titans (1962); Detroit Lions (1963)*
- * Offseason or practice squad member only

Awards and highlights
- First-team All-American (1959); First-team All-Big Ten (1959); Second-team All-Big Ten (1958)

Career AFL statistics
- Rushing yards: 9
- Rushing average: 4.5
- TD–INT: 0-1
- Stats at Pro Football Reference

Dean Zachary Look (born July 23, 1937) is an American former professional football and baseball player. He played college football as quarterback for the Michigan State Spartans and professional football for the New York Titans of the American Football League (AFL). He was also a Major League Baseball (MLB) outfielder, and on-field official in the National Football League (NFL).

He spent 29 years as an NFL official: first as line judge in 1972-77 and then as side judge from 1978 until he retired after the 2001 season (Look missed the 1987 season). He was the side judge who signaled touchdown on the historic Joe Montana to Dwight Clark pass better known as "The Catch" during the 1982 NFC Championship game between the Dallas Cowboys and the San Francisco 49ers. As an official, Look wore the uniform number 49 and was assigned to three Super Bowls—Super Bowl XIII in 1979, Super Bowl XV in 1981, and Super Bowl XXVII in 1993.

Look was the only official hired before 1974, the year the goalposts moved from the goal line to the end line, to officiate in the 2000s. He was one of only three, along with Bob McElwee and Jack Vaughan, who was hired before 1978, the first season of seven-member officiating crews, to work into the 2000s.

Look was an All-American college football quarterback in 1959 playing for the Michigan State Spartans football team. Look finished sixth in the 1959 Heisman Trophy voting. He was selected a year later by the Denver Broncos of the AFL, but he played only one game in his career with the New York Titans in 1962.

Look had a brief stint in Major League Baseball, playing three games in 1961 for the Chicago White Sox of the American League. He had six at bats without getting a hit, pinch hitting in two games and getting his lone start in left field on September 30 against the Baltimore Orioles. He went 0 for 4. A brother, Bruce, was a catcher who played eight seasons in professional baseball, including 59 games for the 1968 Minnesota Twins.

Look was inducted into the Michigan Sports Hall of Fame in 2017.

== See also ==
- List of American Football League players
- Chicago White Sox all-time roster
