= Tom Tischinski =

American baseball player (1944–2024)

- Catcher
- Born: July 12, 1944; Kansas City, Missouri, U.S.
- Died: April 23, 2024 (aged 79); Kansas City, Missouri, U.S.
- Batted: Right Threw: Right

MLB debut
- April 11, 1969, for the Minnesota Twins

Last MLB appearance
- August 11, 1971, for the Minnesota Twins

MLB statistics
- Batting average: .181
- Home runs: 1
- Runs batted in: 6
- Stats at Baseball Reference

Teams
- Minnesota Twins (1969–1971)

Thomas Arthur Tischinski (July 12, 1944 – April 23, 2024) was an American professional baseball player. A catcher, his career extended for 13 years (1962–1974) and included 82 games played in Major League Baseball (MLB) for the Minnesota Twins from 1969 to 1971. Born in Kansas City, Missouri, Tischinski threw and batted right-handed, stood 5 feet 10 inches (1.78 m) tall and weighed 190 pounds (86 kg).

Tischinski's three years as a backup catcher for Minnesota saw him play behind starters John Roseboro and George Mitterwald. The Twins won the American League West Division championship in each of his first two MLB seasons, but he did not appear in the postseason series that followed. In 137 plate appearances over his career, he collected 21 hits and 18 bases on balls. His lone big-league home run came on August 21, 1970, at Metropolitan Stadium off Casey Cox of the Washington Senators and provided the winning margin in a 4–3 Twin victory. He also hit two doubles and was credited with six runs batted in, batting .181 lifetime. During his minor league career, he played in 888 games.

Tischinski died in Kansas City on April 23, 2024, at the age of 79.
