= Warren Bogle =

American baseball player

- Pitcher
- Born: October 19, 1946 (age 78); Passaic, New Jersey
- Batted: Left Threw: Left

MLB debut
- July 31, 1968, for the Oakland Athletics

Last MLB appearance
- September 15, 1968, for the Oakland Athletics

MLB statistics
- Win–loss record: 0–0
- Earned run average: 4.30
- Strikeouts: 26
- Stats at Baseball Reference

Teams
- Oakland Athletics (1968)

Warren Frederick Bogle (born October 19, 1946) is a former American Major League Baseball pitcher. He appeared in 16 games played for the Oakland Athletics during the 1968 season. Bogle played college baseball at the University of Miami.
