= Larry Napp =

American baseball umpire (1916-1993)

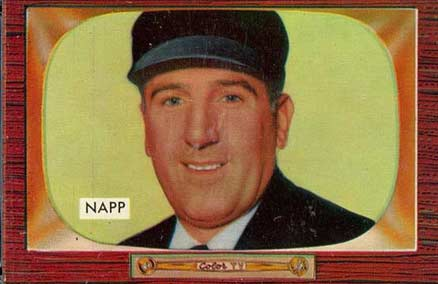
- Born: May 21, 1916; Brooklyn, New York, U.S.
- Died: July 7, 1993 (aged 77); Plantation, Florida, U.S.
- Occupation: American League Umpire
- Years active: 1951 – 1974
- Employer: American League
- Height: 5 ft 11 in (180 cm)

Larry Albert Napp, born Larry Albert Napodano (May 21, 1916 – July 7, 1993), was an American umpire in Major League Baseball who worked in the American League from 1951 to 1974. He officiated in the World Series in 1954, 1956, 1963 and 1969, and in the All-Star Game in 1953, 1957, 1961 (second game) and 1968, calling balls and strikes in 1961. He also worked the American League Championship Series in 1971 and 1974, serving as crew chief in 1974. His 3,609 total games ranked sixth in AL history when he retired.

== Early life and career ==
Napp was born in Brooklyn, New York and played as a catcher in high school and in the minor leagues from 1938 to 1940 in the Eastern Shore League, Pennsylvania–Ontario–New York League (PONY League) and Michigan State League. He also boxed professionally as a lightweight and welterweight from 1936 to 1938. A judo expert, he served as a chief fitness instructor in the Navy from 1942 to 1946 at United States Naval Training Center Bainbridge, Maryland and Staten Island during World War II.

He began umpiring in the minor leagues in 1948, working in the Middle Atlantic League (1948) and International League (1949–50) before moving up to the AL.

== Notable games ==
Napp umpired in eight no-hitters in his career, and is one of seven umpires to have worked in two perfect games. He was the third base umpire during Don Larsen's perfect game for the New York Yankees against the Brooklyn Dodgers in the 1956 Series, and was at first base for Catfish Hunter's perfect game for the Oakland Athletics against the Minnesota Twins on May 8, 1968. Among the other notable games he worked were Bob Feller's record-tying third no-hitter on July 1, 1951, Bobo Holloman's no-hitter in his first career start on May 6, 1953, Dean Chance's 2–1 no-hitter for the Twins against the Cleveland Indians on August 25, 1967, and Clyde Wright's no-hitter for the California Angels against the Athletics on July 3, 1970, the first no-hitter in Anaheim Stadium history; Napp called balls and strikes for the last two contests. Napp was also the home plate umpire for Early Wynn's 300th career victory, as well as Denny McLain's 30th victory of the 1968 season (September 14), the last time to date that a pitcher has won 30 games during a regular season.

In 1972, after Napp and Detroit Tigers manager Billy Martin had feuded for two seasons, Napp received death threats in Detroit. As a precaution, Napp was asked to sit out of two Detroit series in June of that year. The source of the threats was unknown. Tiger Stadium had been utilizing a sniper with a pellet gun behind home plate for part of that season.

== Personal life ==
He married Phyllis Tencza on March 19, 1942. They had one son, Larry Napp, Jr., who became a Florida high school baseball coach.

== Later life and death ==
Prior to the 1962 season, he moved from his long-time home of Staten Island to Plantation, Florida. He died there in 1993 at age 77 after suffering a heart attack.

== See also ==
- List of Major League Baseball umpires (disambiguation)
