= Danny Morris =

American baseball player (1946–2023)

- Pitcher
- Born: June 11, 1946; Greenville, Kentucky, U.S.
- Died: September 23, 2023 (aged 77); Oakland City, Indiana, U.S.
- Batted: Right Threw: Right

MLB debut
- September 10, 1968, for the Minnesota Twins

Last MLB appearance
- June 29, 1969, for the Minnesota Twins

MLB statistics
- Win–loss record: 0–2
- Earned run average: 2.81
- Innings: 16
- Stats at Baseball Reference

Teams
- Minnesota Twins (1968–1969)

Danny Walker Morris (June 11, 1946 – September 23, 2023) was an American professional baseball player, a right-handed pitcher who appeared in six Major League games for the 1968–1969 Minnesota Twins. He was 5 feet 7 inches (1.70 m) tall and weighed 175 pounds (79 kg) during his active career. He was a top prospect, with a 98 mph fastball, until an arm injury ended his career.

Morris played seven seasons (1966–1972) of professional baseball, all in the Twins' organization. He twice won 16 games in the minor leagues, going 16–8 with an earned run average of 2.16 with the Wisconsin Rapids Twins of the Class A Midwest League in 1966, and 16–15 (3.94) with the Denver Bears of the Triple-A Pacific Coast League in 1968. After the latter season, he received his first trial with the 1968 Twins, working in three September games, two as a starting pitcher, and losing his only decision in a September 18, 1968, starting assignment against the California Angels. Morris spent most of 1969 with Denver, but was recalled by the Twins in June and appeared in three more games. In his only start for the 1969 Twins, he again faced the Angels and again absorbed the defeat, giving up two earned runs and three hits (including a two-run home run by Rick Reichardt) in three innings of work.

As a Major Leaguer, Morris worked in 16 complete innings, allowing 16 hits and nine runs (five earned), with three bases on balls and twenty seven strikeouts.

Danny Morris died on September 23, 2023, at the age of 77.
