= 1969 American League Championship Series =

Inaugural edition of Major League Baseball's American League Championship Series

| Team (Wins) | Managers | Season |
|---|---|---|
| Baltimore Orioles (3) | Earl Weaver | 109–53, .673, GA: 19 |
| Minnesota Twins (0) | Billy Martin | 97–65, .599, GA: 9 |
- Dates: October 4–6
- Umpires: Nestor Chylak (crew chief); Ed Runge; Frank Umont; Bob Stewart; Johnny Rice; Red Flaherty

Broadcast
- Television: NBC; WJZ-TV (BAL); WTCN-TV (MIN)
- TV announcers: NBC: Curt Gowdy and Tony Kubek (Game 1); Jim Simpson and Sandy Koufax (Game 3) (NBC did not televise Game 2 due to conflicts with its AFL coverage.); WJZ-TV: Chuck Thompson, Bill O'Donnell and Jim Karvellas; WTCN-TV: Herb Carneal, Merle Harmon and Halsey Hall

The 1969 American League Championship Series was the first ALCS held after Major League Baseball adopted the two-division format that season. It was the opening semifinal round on the American League side of the inaugural edition of the MLB postseason. It featured the Baltimore Orioles vs. the Minnesota Twins, with the Orioles winning the series 3–0 and advancing to the 1969 World Series, where they would lose to the New York Mets in five games. The Orioles and Twins would meet again the following year, with similar results.

This was the first of three straight appearances in the ALCS for the Orioles, with all 3 series ending in a 3-game sweep by Baltimore.

== Summary ==
=== Minnesota Twins vs. Baltimore Orioles ===
Baltimore won the series, 3–0.

| Game | Date | Score | Location | Time | Attendance |
|---|---|---|---|---|---|
| 1 | October 4 | Minnesota Twins – 3, Baltimore Orioles – 4 (12) | Memorial Stadium | 3:29 | 39,324 |
| 2 | October 5 | Minnesota Twins – 0, Baltimore Orioles – 1 (11) | Memorial Stadium | 3:17 | 41,704 |
| 3 | October 6 | Baltimore Orioles – 11, Minnesota Twins – 2 | Metropolitan Stadium | 2:48 | 32,735 |

== Game summaries ==
=== Game 1 ===
October 4, 1969 1:00 pm (ET) at Memorial Stadium in Baltimore, Maryland
| Team | 1 | 2 | 3 | 4 | 5 | 6 | 7 | 8 | 9 | 10 | 11 | 12 | R | H | E |
|---|---|---|---|---|---|---|---|---|---|---|---|---|---|---|---|
| Minnesota | 0 | 0 | 0 | 0 | 1 | 0 | 2 | 0 | 0 | 0 | 0 | 0 | 3 | 4 | 2 |
| Baltimore | 0 | 0 | 0 | 1 | 1 | 0 | 0 | 0 | 1 | 0 | 0 | 1 | 4 | 10 | 1 |
WP: Dick Hall (1–0) LP: Ron Perranoski (0–1); Home runs: MIN: Tony Oliva (1); BAL: Frank Robinson (1), Mark Belanger (1), Boog Powell (1)

In the opener, eventual 1969 Cy Young Award winner Mike Cuellar faced off against 20-game winner Jim Perry, who would finish 3rd in voting. Frank Robinson's home run in the fourth put the Orioles up 1–0 off Perry, but the Twins tied the game in the fifth inning when Tony Oliva hit a leadoff double off Cuellar, went to third on Robinson's error and scored on Bob Allison's sacrifice fly. Mark Belanger's home run in the bottom of the inning put the Orioles back in front 2–1, but Oliva's two-run home run in the seventh after a walk put the Twins up 3–2. In the ninth inning, Boog Powell tied the score with a home run over the right-field fence. Reliever Ron Perranoski, who worked in all three games, shut off Baltimore's offense at that point. Then, with two down in the 12th and Belanger on third, Paul Blair stepped to the plate. Acting on his own, he bunted toward third. Neither third baseman Harmon Killebrew nor catcher John Roseboro could make the play as Belanger sped across the plate with the winning run. Dick Hall, who pitched 2/3 of an inning, was the winner. Perranoski did not allow a ball to leave the infield in the 12th, but was the loser nonetheless.

=== Game 2 ===
October 5, 1969 2:00 pm (ET) at Memorial Stadium in Baltimore, Maryland
| Team | 1 | 2 | 3 | 4 | 5 | 6 | 7 | 8 | 9 | 10 | 11 | R | H | E |
|---|---|---|---|---|---|---|---|---|---|---|---|---|---|---|
| Minnesota | 0 | 0 | 0 | 0 | 0 | 0 | 0 | 0 | 0 | 0 | 0 | 0 | 3 | 1 |
| Baltimore | 0 | 0 | 0 | 0 | 0 | 0 | 0 | 0 | 0 | 0 | 1 | 1 | 8 | 0 |
WP: Dave McNally (1–0) LP: Dave Boswell (0–1)

Game 2 pitted Dave McNally, winner of 15 games in a row during the season against Dave Boswell. Both pitchers pitched shutout baseball into the 10th inning, until Curt Motton's pinch-hit single in the bottom of the 11th, scored Boog Powell from second base for the only run of the game. Boswell was the losing pitcher with a line of 10 2/3 innings, with 7 hits allowed, 7 walks, and 4 strikeouts with the lone earned run of the game. McNally pitched an eleven-inning complete game shutout (the longest in MLB postseason history), struck out 11 Twins batters and yielded only three hits, none after the fourth inning.

=== Game 3 ===
October 6, 1969 1:30 pm (CT) at Metropolitan Stadium in Bloomington, Minnesota
| Team | 1 | 2 | 3 | 4 | 5 | 6 | 7 | 8 | 9 | R | H | E |
|---|---|---|---|---|---|---|---|---|---|---|---|---|
| Baltimore | 0 | 3 | 0 | 2 | 0 | 1 | 0 | 2 | 3 | 11 | 18 | 0 |
| Minnesota | 1 | 0 | 0 | 0 | 1 | 0 | 0 | 0 | 0 | 2 | 10 | 2 |
WP: Jim Palmer (1–0) LP: Bob Miller (0–1); Home runs: BAL: Paul Blair (1); MIN: None

In a pivotal Game 3, the Twins sent veteran Bob Miller to the mound while the Orioles trotted out their young budding ace, future 3-time Cy Young winner Jim Palmer. The Twins struck first in the bottom of the first off Palmer on Rich Reese's RBI single after a two-out double and intentional walk, but Elrod Hendricks's two-run double after a double and error put the Orioles up 2–1 in the second. Two outs later, Don Buford's RBI single made it 3–1 Orioles and knocked Miller out of the game after only 1 2/3 innings. Paul Blair's two-run double in the fourth off Dick Woodson made it 5–1 Orioles. The Twins scored their last run of the series in the fifth when Harmon Killebrew doubled with two outs and scored on Reese's single. Frank Robinson's RBI single with two on off Al Worthington made it 6–2 Orioles in the sixth. Blair's two-run home run in the eighth off Dean Chance made it 8–2 Orioles. Next inning, Davey Johnson hit a leadoff single off Chance, then scored on Hendricks's double off Ron Perranoski while Hendricks himself scored on an error. Mark Belanger singled and scored on Blair's two-out double. Palmer pitched a scoreless ninth to finish the series.

This Monday game at Metropolitan Stadium forced the NFL's Minnesota Vikings to play their game against division rival Green Bay the previous day at the University of Minnesota's Memorial Stadium in Minneapolis. It was the first NFL game played in a Big Ten stadium. That same day, because the Atlanta Braves were hosting Game 2 of the NLCS, the Atlanta Falcons had to move their home game against the Baltimore Colts from Atlanta Stadium to Grant Field on the campus of Georgia Tech.

== Composite box ==
1969 ALCS (3–0): Baltimore Orioles over Minnesota Twins

| Team | 1 | 2 | 3 | 4 | 5 | 6 | 7 | 8 | 9 | 10 | 11 | 12 | R | H | E |
|---|---|---|---|---|---|---|---|---|---|---|---|---|---|---|---|
| Baltimore Orioles | 0 | 3 | 0 | 3 | 1 | 1 | 0 | 2 | 4 | 0 | 1 | 1 | 16 | 36 | 1 |
| Minnesota Twins | 1 | 0 | 0 | 0 | 2 | 0 | 2 | 0 | 0 | 0 | 0 | 0 | 5 | 17 | 5 |
Total attendance: 113,763 Average attendance: 37,921

== Aftermath ==
The 1970 American League Championship Series (ALCS) also featured the Orioles and Twins, with the Orioles sweeping the series again. In that year's World Series, they avenged their 1969 upset defeat to the Mets, and defeated the Cincinnati Reds in five games to give the city of Baltimore their second World Series championship.

Although the Twins made it back ALCS the next season, they did so without manager Billy Martin, who was fired on October 13, 1969. Despite the team's success, owner Calvin Griffith was not enamored with Martin's conduct, which was highlighted by a few incidents during the 1969 season. The most notable came when Martin reportedly instructed pitcher Dick Woodson to throw at Oakland A's slugger Reggie Jackson after Jackson hit two home runs earlier in the game; this in turn, led to a full-scale brawl between the teams. Another incident came when former US vice president Hubert Humphrey was kicked out of the locker room when he tried to visit after a Twins loss. The final straw came during the 1969 ALCS. Griffith was also unhappy both that Martin had not pitched Jim Kaat (a friend of his) and that the explanation he had asked Martin for had been "Because I'm the manager". The Twins were the first of four teams Martin would lead to the playoffs in his managerial career (Twins, Tigers, Yankees–winning a World Series in 1977, and Athletics), and he was fired from each team within a few seasons of their initial playoff appearance.
