= 1963 World Series =

60th edition of Major League Baseball's championship series

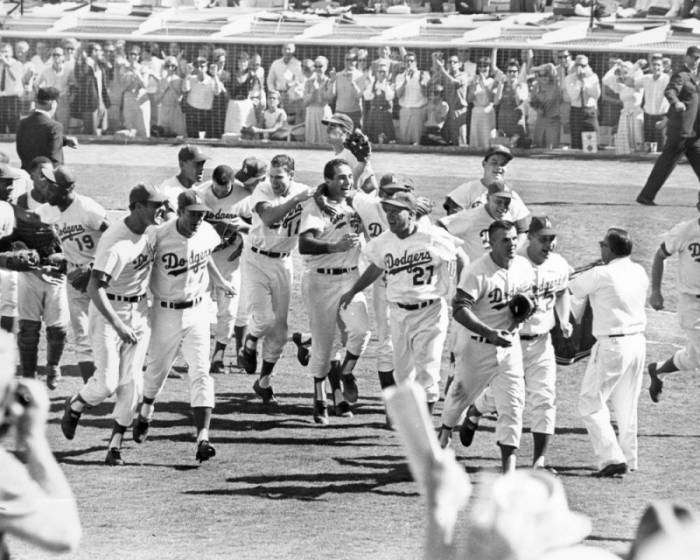
- The Dodgers celebrate the sweep of the Yankees after the final pitch of the World Series
| Team (Wins) | Managers | Season |
|---|---|---|
| Los Angeles Dodgers (4) | Walter Alston | 99–63, .611, GA: 6 |
| New York Yankees (0) | Ralph Houk | 104–57, .646, GA: 10 1/2 |
- Dates: October 2–6
- Venue(s): Yankee Stadium (New York); Dodger Stadium (Los Angeles)
- MVP: Sandy Koufax (Los Angeles)
- Umpires: Joe Paparella (AL), Tom Gorman (NL), Larry Napp (AL), Shag Crawford (NL), Johnny Rice (AL: outfield only), Tony Venzon (NL: outfield only)
- Hall of Famers: Dodgers: Walt Alston (manager); Leo Durocher (coach); Don Drysdale; Sandy Koufax; Yankees: Yogi Berra; Whitey Ford; Mickey Mantle

Broadcast
- Television: NBC
- TV announcers: Mel Allen and Vin Scully
- Radio: NBC
- Radio announcers: Ernie Harwell and Joe Garagiola

The 1963 World Series was the championship series of Major League Baseball's (MLB) 1963 season. The 60th edition of the World Series, it was a best-of-seven playoff that matched the American League (AL) champion and two-time defending World Series champion New York Yankees against the National League (NL) champion Los Angeles Dodgers.

The Dodgers swept the Series in four games to secure their second World’s championship in five years, and their third in franchise history. Dodgers starting pitchers Sandy Koufax, Don Drysdale, and Johnny Podres, and ace reliever Ron Perranoski combined to give up only four runs in four games. The dominance of the Dodgers pitchers was so complete that at no point in any of the four games did the Yankees have the lead. New York was held to a .171 team batting average, the lowest ever for the Yankees in the postseason. Koufax, who pitched 2 complete games with a 1.50 ERA and 23 strikeouts, was named the World Series Most Valuable Player. Koufax was the first player since the introduction of the award in the 1955 Series to be named league MVP and World Series MVP in the same calendar year. Coincidentally, the 1955 World Series was also won by the Dodgers.

This was the first time in their history that the Yankees were swept in a World Series in four straight games — the 1922 World Series had one tie.

Of the Dodgers' nine World championships to date, this remains the only one clinched in their home ballpark (although their 2020 title was won as the designated "home team" as part of that year's neutral-site World Series in Arlington, Texas).

This series was also the first meeting between teams from New York City and Los Angeles for a major professional sports championship. Eight more such meetings have followed with four more times each in the World Series, three in the NBA Finals, and the 2014 Stanley Cup Final.

== Background ==
=== Yankees ===
Despite injuries that limited Mickey Mantle to just 65 games, the Yankees went 104–57 to win their fourth straight American League pennant—this one by 10 1/2 games. Catcher Elston Howard (.287 BA, 28 HRs, 85 RBI) won the MVP Award, while Joe Pepitone, Roger Maris, and Tom Tresh also topped the 20 home run mark. Their pitching was anchored by Whitey Ford (24 wins, 2.74 ERA) and Jim Bouton (21 wins, 2.53 ERA).

=== Dodgers ===
The Dodgers' road to the World Series was much more challenging. After blowing a four-game lead with seven to play in 1962, the Dodgers again built a lead in 1963. On August 21, the Dodgers beat the Cardinals 2–1 in 16 innings to take a 7 1/2 game lead. When they went to St. Louis for a three-game series on September 16, their lead was one game over the Cardinals, who had won 19 of 20 games. Sports fans around the country were saying how the Dodgers were going to blow it again. But the Dodgers swept the three games from the Cardinals to move four games ahead with nine to play; a 4–1 win over the Mets clinched the pennant in the season's 158th game.

== Summary ==
NL Los Angeles Dodgers (4) vs. AL New York Yankees (0)

| Game | Date | Score | Location | Time | Attendance |
|---|---|---|---|---|---|
| 1 | October 2 | Los Angeles Dodgers – 5, New York Yankees – 2 | Yankee Stadium | 2:09 | 69,000 |
| 2 | October 3 | Los Angeles Dodgers – 4, New York Yankees – 1 | Yankee Stadium | 2:13 | 66,455 |
| 3 | October 5 | New York Yankees – 0, Los Angeles Dodgers – 1 | Dodger Stadium | 2:05 | 55,912 |
| 4 | October 6 | New York Yankees – 1, Los Angeles Dodgers – 2 | Dodger Stadium | 1:50 | 55,912 |

== Matchups ==
=== Game 1 ===
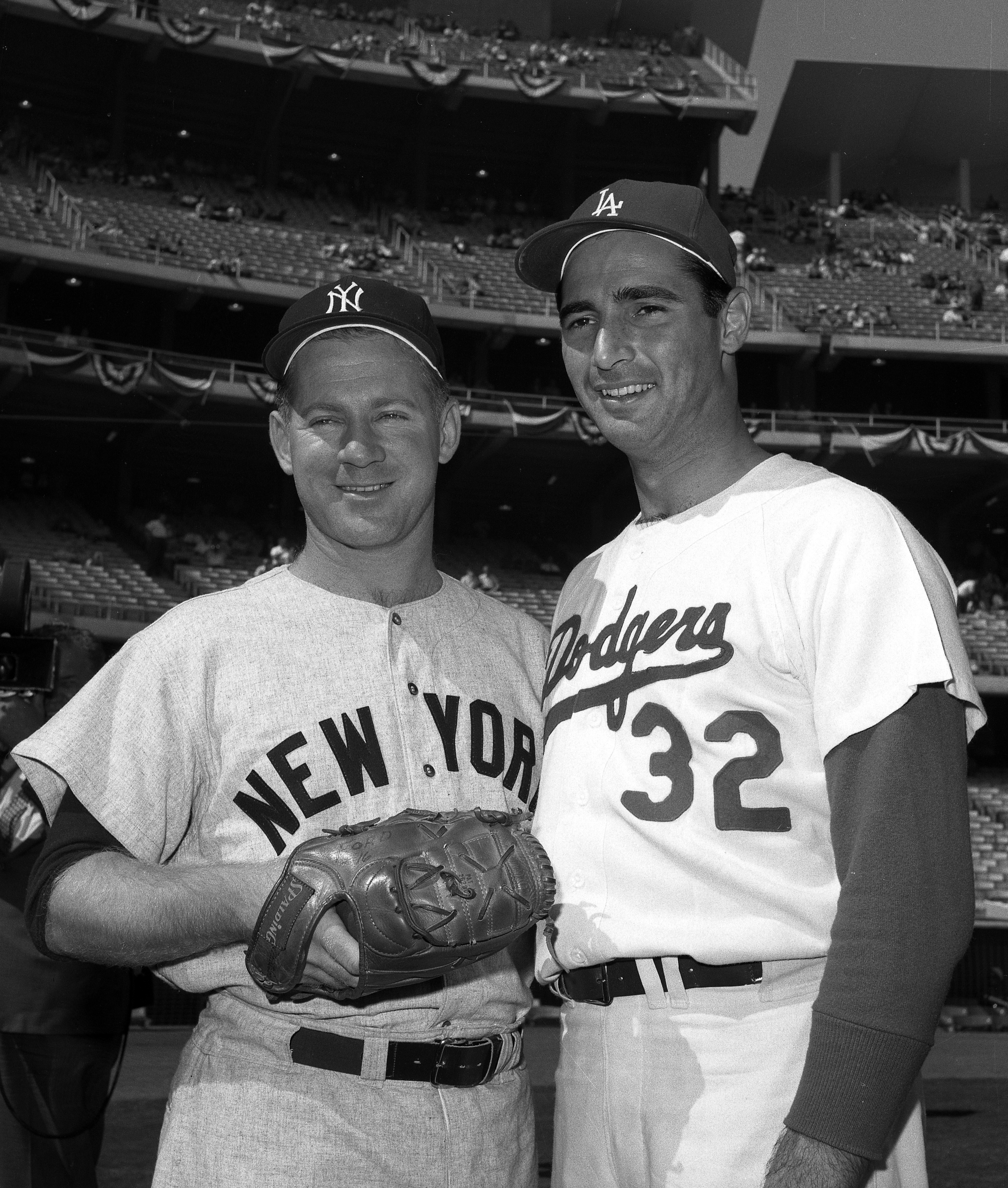
Future Hall of Fame pitchers Sandy Koufax (right) and Whitey Ford, starting aces of the 1963 World Series

Wednesday, October 2, 1963 1:00 pm (ET) at Yankee Stadium in Bronx, New York
| Team | 1 | 2 | 3 | 4 | 5 | 6 | 7 | 8 | 9 | R | H | E |
|---|---|---|---|---|---|---|---|---|---|---|---|---|
| Los Angeles | 0 | 4 | 1 | 0 | 0 | 0 | 0 | 0 | 0 | 5 | 9 | 0 |
| New York | 0 | 0 | 0 | 0 | 0 | 0 | 0 | 2 | 0 | 2 | 6 | 0 |
WP: Sandy Koufax (1–0) LP: Whitey Ford (0–1); Home runs: LAD: John Roseboro (1); NYY: Tom Tresh (1)

Sandy Koufax started it off with a record 15-strikeout performance in Game 1 to outduel the Yankees' ace left-hander Whitey Ford. The 15 strikeouts bested fellow Dodgers pitcher Carl Erskine's mark in 1953 by one, and would be surpassed by Bob Gibson in 1968 with 17. Koufax also tied a World Series record when he fanned the first five Yankees he faced.

Clete Boyer was the only Yankees regular not to strike out. Mickey Mantle, Tom Tresh and Tony Kubek each struck out twice, and Bobby Richardson struck out three times—his only three-strikeout game in 1448 regular season or World Series games. Koufax also struck out three pinch-hitters, including Harry Bright to end the game.

Ford set the Dodgers down in order in the first inning, but got into trouble in the second inning. With one out, right fielder Frank Howard doubled into left center field. A single by first baseman Bill Skowron plated Howard to give the Dodgers a 1–0 lead. Second baseman Dick Tracewski's single preceded a three-run home run by catcher John Roseboro to give the Dodgers a 4–0 lead.

The Dodgers upped the lead to 5-0 when Skowron singled home Willie Davis with two outs in the third inning against Ford, who went just five innings.

The Yankees scored twice in the eighth inning when Tony Kubek singled with one out and Tom Tresh homered with two outs to cut the lead to 5–2.

=== Game 2 ===
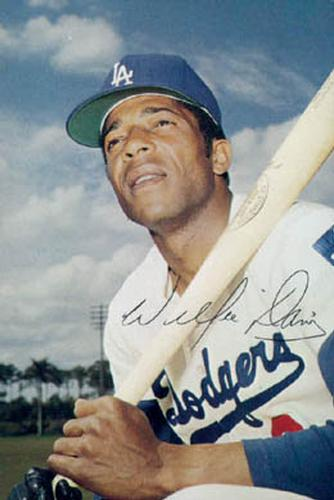
Willie Davis

Thursday, October 3, 1963 1:00 pm (ET) at Yankee Stadium in Bronx, New York
| Team | 1 | 2 | 3 | 4 | 5 | 6 | 7 | 8 | 9 | R | H | E |
|---|---|---|---|---|---|---|---|---|---|---|---|---|
| Los Angeles | 2 | 0 | 0 | 1 | 0 | 0 | 0 | 1 | 0 | 4 | 10 | 1 |
| New York | 0 | 0 | 0 | 0 | 0 | 0 | 0 | 0 | 1 | 1 | 7 | 0 |
WP: Johnny Podres (1–0) LP: Al Downing (0–1) Sv: Ron Perranoski (1); Home runs: LAD: Bill Skowron (1); NYY: None

Willie Davis doubled in two runs in the first inning (after Maury Wills and Jim Gilliam singled), former Yankee Bill Skowron homered in the fourth, and Tommy Davis had two triples, including an RBI triple in the eighth after a second Davis double, to lead the Dodger offense. Yankee starter Al Downing, who would take the loss, went only five innings and charged with three runs. Ralph Terry, in relief, allowed Davis's RBI triple. Dodger manager Walt Alston went with #3 starter Johnny Podres over #2 starter Don Drysdale because he was left-handed and Yankee Stadium was favorable to left-handed pitchers. Podres delivered a six-hitter through 8 1/3 innings; ace reliever Ron Perranoski, also a left-hander, got the last two outs and the save, and the Dodgers headed home with 2–0 Series lead. Yankees right fielder Roger Maris left the game in the third after hurting his left arm running into the right field foul wall while chasing down Tommy Davis's first triple and would miss the final two games of the series. He was replaced by Héctor López, who actually doubled and Elston Howard singled him home in the eighth for the Yankees' only run that game.

=== Game 3 ===
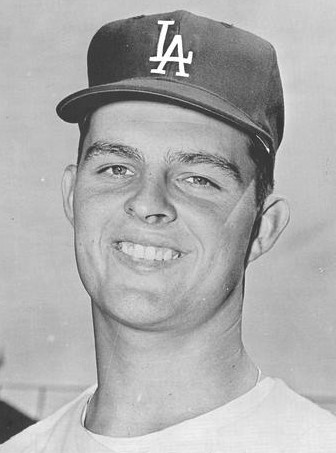
Don Drysdale

Saturday, October 5, 1963 1:00 pm (PT) at Dodger Stadium in Los Angeles, California
| Team | 1 | 2 | 3 | 4 | 5 | 6 | 7 | 8 | 9 | R | H | E |
|---|---|---|---|---|---|---|---|---|---|---|---|---|
| New York | 0 | 0 | 0 | 0 | 0 | 0 | 0 | 0 | 0 | 0 | 3 | 0 |
| Los Angeles | 1 | 0 | 0 | 0 | 0 | 0 | 0 | 0 | X | 1 | 4 | 1 |
WP: Don Drysdale (1–0) LP: Jim Bouton (0–1)

Don Drysdale pitched a masterful three-hitter at Dodger Stadium in his complete-game win. Manager Walter Alston called Drysdale's performance "one of the greatest pitched games I ever saw." Jim Bouton, making his first World Series start, dueled Drysdale throughout, permitting only four hits in seven innings for a losing cause. The lone run of the game came in the bottom of the first on a Jim Gilliam walk, a wild pitch and a two-out single by Tommy Davis. Gilliam almost scored again in the eighth off Hal Reniff, but was caught in an attempt to steal third. The final out came on Joe Pepitone's drive that backed Dodger right fielder Ron Fairly up against the bullpen gate to make the catch of a ball that would have been a home run in Yankee Stadium. Tony Kubek had two of the Yankees' three hits, but none of the hits were extra-base hits.

=== Game 4 ===
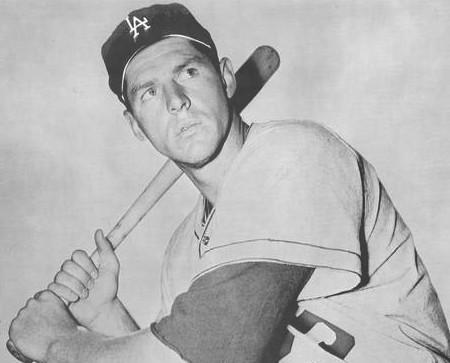
Frank Howard

Sunday, October 6, 1963 1:00 pm (PT) at Dodger Stadium in Los Angeles, California
| Team | 1 | 2 | 3 | 4 | 5 | 6 | 7 | 8 | 9 | R | H | E |
|---|---|---|---|---|---|---|---|---|---|---|---|---|
| New York | 0 | 0 | 0 | 0 | 0 | 0 | 1 | 0 | 0 | 1 | 6 | 1 |
| Los Angeles | 0 | 0 | 0 | 0 | 1 | 0 | 1 | 0 | X | 2 | 2 | 1 |
WP: Sandy Koufax (2–0) LP: Whitey Ford (0–2); Home runs: NYY: Mickey Mantle (1); LAD: Frank Howard (1)

Aces were on the mound again in a game 1 rematch between Whitey Ford and Sandy Koufax. This time, it was a pitcher's duel. The Dodgers scored first in the bottom of the fifth on a monumental Frank Howard home run into the second (Loge) level at Dodger Stadium. The Yankees tied it on a Mickey Mantle home run in the top of the seventh. But in the bottom of the inning, Gilliam hit a high hopper to Yankee third baseman Clete Boyer; Boyer leaped to make the grab, and fired an accurate throw to first base. But first baseman Joe Pepitone lost Boyer's peg in the white-shirted crowd background; the ball struck Pepitone in the arm and rolled down the right field line, allowing Gilliam to scamper all the way to third base. He then scored a moment later on Willie Davis' sacrifice fly. Sandy Koufax went on to hold the Yankees for the final two innings for a 2–1 victory and the Dodgers' third world championship. To date, this is the only time the Dodgers have won the deciding game of a World Series at home. (The Dodgers won the 2020 World Series in Game 6 while they were designated as the home team, but the game was played at a neutral site, Globe Life Field in Arlington, Texas, as a result of the COVID-19 global pandemic.)

The World Series Most Valuable Player Award went to Sandy Koufax, who started two of the four games and had two complete game victories. He struck out 23 batters and only surrendered three earned runs, recording an ERA of 1.50. When the award was given to Koufax at a luncheon in New York City, he was presented with a new car—while the luncheon was taking place, a New York City police officer put a parking violation ticket on the car's windshield.

== Composite line score ==
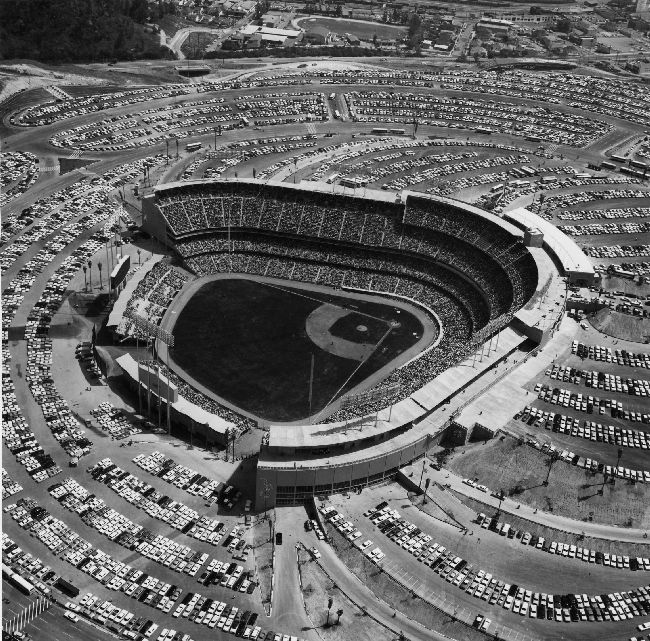
Dodger Stadium

1963 World Series (4–0): Los Angeles Dodgers (N.L.) over New York Yankees (A.L.)

| Team | 1 | 2 | 3 | 4 | 5 | 6 | 7 | 8 | 9 | R | H | E |
|---|---|---|---|---|---|---|---|---|---|---|---|---|
| Los Angeles Dodgers | 3 | 4 | 1 | 1 | 1 | 0 | 1 | 1 | 0 | 12 | 25 | 3 |
| New York Yankees | 0 | 0 | 0 | 0 | 0 | 0 | 1 | 2 | 1 | 4 | 22 | 1 |
Total attendance: 247,279 Average attendance: 61,820; Winning player's share: $12,794 Losing player's share: $7,874

The Yankees' four runs in the series was, at the time, the second-lowest total in a World Series, as the Philadelphia Athletics had scored only three runs in 1905. The Los Angeles Dodgers would set a new low in 1966, two runs.

== Aftermath ==
The Yankees returned to the World Series the next year, but lost to the St. Louis Cardinals in seven games.

The Dodgers returned to the World Series two years later, and defeated the Minnesota Twins in seven games after trailing two-games-to-none in the series.

== In popular culture ==
- In the 1986 novel Replay by Ken Grimwood, the protagonist bets his life savings on a Dodgers sweep, knowing they will win. His winnings total more than $12 million, at the apparent odds of 100–1, with Grimwood referring to it as "one of the great upsets in baseball history".
- This is the World Series that Jack Nicholson's character R.P. McMurphy lobbies unsuccessfully to watch on television (and subsequently "announces" by imagining the action) in Miloš Forman's 1975 film One Flew Over the Cuckoo's Nest. He imagines quite a different scene than what occurred, however, as he describes Richardson, Tresh, and Mantle knocking Koufax out of the box. In reality, the Yankees never led at any time in the Series, and only once in the entire Series (and that only for a half-inning) were the Yankees and Dodgers tied at a score other than 0–0. A brief clip of Ernie Harwell's NBC Radio broadcast of Game 2 can be heard in the film.
- On March 21, 1964, The Joey Bishop Show had lead character Joey Barnes host members of the 1963 Los Angeles Dodgers on his variety show. Don Drysdale sang "I Left My Heart in San Francisco," Joey had fun with 6'7" Frank Howard, and all the Dodgers sang a parody of "High Hopes" in which they celebrated their victory over the Yankees. The lyrics to this parody were written by Sammy Cahn, who also wrote the original lyrics.
- In the documentary Mr. Pearson, filmed by D.A. Pennebaker, Canadian Prime Minister Lester B. Pearson is shown distracted at a meeting in his office while watching Game 2 on television.

== Broadcasting ==
- This was longtime Yankees announcer Mel Allen's 22nd and final World Series broadcast. Allen was suffering from an attack of severe laryngitis at the time of the Series, and while doing play-by-play for NBC television during Game 4 his voice gave out completely in the bottom of the eighth inning, requiring Vin Scully to take over for the remainder of the game. (The following year—Allen's last with the Yankees—he would be passed over for the Series assignment in favor of boothmate Phil Rizzuto.)
- Game 4 was the highest-rated sports broadcast of 1963, per Nielsen ratings. Of all televised World Series games, its 39.5 rating (percentage of all U.S. television-equipped households that watched the game) has only been surpassed by Game 7 in 1975 (39.6) and Game 6 in 1980 (40.0).

== See also ==
- 1963 Japan Series
- List of World Series sweeps
- Dodgers–Yankees rivalry

== Sources ==
- Cohen, Richard M.; Neft, David S. (1990). The World Series: Complete Play-By-Play of Every Game, 1903–1989. New York: St. Martin's Press. pp. 298–301. ISBN 0-312-03960-3.
- Reichler, Joseph (1982). The Baseball Encyclopedia (5th ed.). Macmillan Publishing. p. 2171. ISBN 0-02-579010-2.
- Forman, Sean L. "1963 World Series". Baseball-Reference.com – Major League Statistics and Information. Archived from the original on November 30, 2007.
