= Bruce Look =

American baseball player (born 1943)

- Catcher
- Born: June 9, 1943 (age 82); Lansing, Michigan
- Batted: Left Threw: Right

MLB debut
- April 17, 1968, for the Minnesota Twins

Last MLB appearance
- September 29, 1968, for the Minnesota Twins

MLB statistics
- Batting average: .246
- Home runs: 0
- Runs batted in: 9
- Stats at Baseball Reference

Teams
- Minnesota Twins (1968)

Bruce Michael Look (born June 9, 1943) is an American former professional baseball player and catcher who appeared in 59 games played in Major League Baseball as a member of the 1968 Minnesota Twins. The native of Lansing, Michigan, threw right-handed, batted left-handed and was listed as 5 feet 11 inches (1.80 m) tall and 183 pounds (83 kg). He is the younger brother of Dean Look, who played for the Chicago White Sox in 1961, and also played professional football and was a longtime on-field official in the National Football League.

Like his brother, Bruce Look played football and baseball for Michigan State University before serving in the United States Army. He then signed his first pro baseball contract. In 1968, his only MLB season, Look appeared in 41 games in the field, 29 as the Twins' starting catcher, playing behind veteran John Roseboro, like Look a left-handed batter. His 29 big-league hits included four doubles; he had nine runs batted in. Look retired after the 1971 minor league season.
