= Frank Kostro =

American baseball player (born 1937)

- Utility player
- Born: August 4, 1937 (age 87); Windber, Pennsylvania, U.S.
- Batted: Right Threw: Right

MLB debut
- September 2, 1962, for the Detroit Tigers

Last MLB appearance
- September 21, 1969, for the Minnesota Twins

MLB statistics
- Batting average: .244
- Home runs: 5
- Runs batted in: 37

NPB statistics
- Batting average: .200
- Home runs: 1
- Runs batted in: 6
- Stats at Baseball Reference

Teams
- Detroit Tigers (1962–1963); Los Angeles Angels (1963); Minnesota Twins (1964–1965, 1967–1969); Hankyu Braves (1970)

Frank Jerry Kostro (born August 4, 1937) is a retired American professional baseball player. The native of Windber, Pennsylvania appeared in 266 games over seven seasons (1962–65; 1967–69) for the Detroit Tigers, Los Angeles Angels and Minnesota Twins of Major League Baseball. Following his big league career, Kostro played in Japan in 1970 for the Hankyu Braves.

Kostro threw and batted right-handed and was listed as 6 feet 2 inches (1.88 m) tall and 190 pounds (86 kg). He signed with the Tigers in 1956 after attending the University of Michigan and his pro career in North America lasted for 14 seasons. He played multiple positions during his MLB career: 55 games as a third baseman, 38 games as an outfielder, and 14 games each as a second baseman and first baseman. In 1962, he was named an all-star as a utilityman in recognition of his versatility in the Triple-A American Association after batting .321 with 165 hits and 97 runs batted in in 136 games.

His 114 MLB hits included 17 doubles, two triples, and five home runs.
