= Dave Boswell (baseball) =

American baseball player (1945–2012)

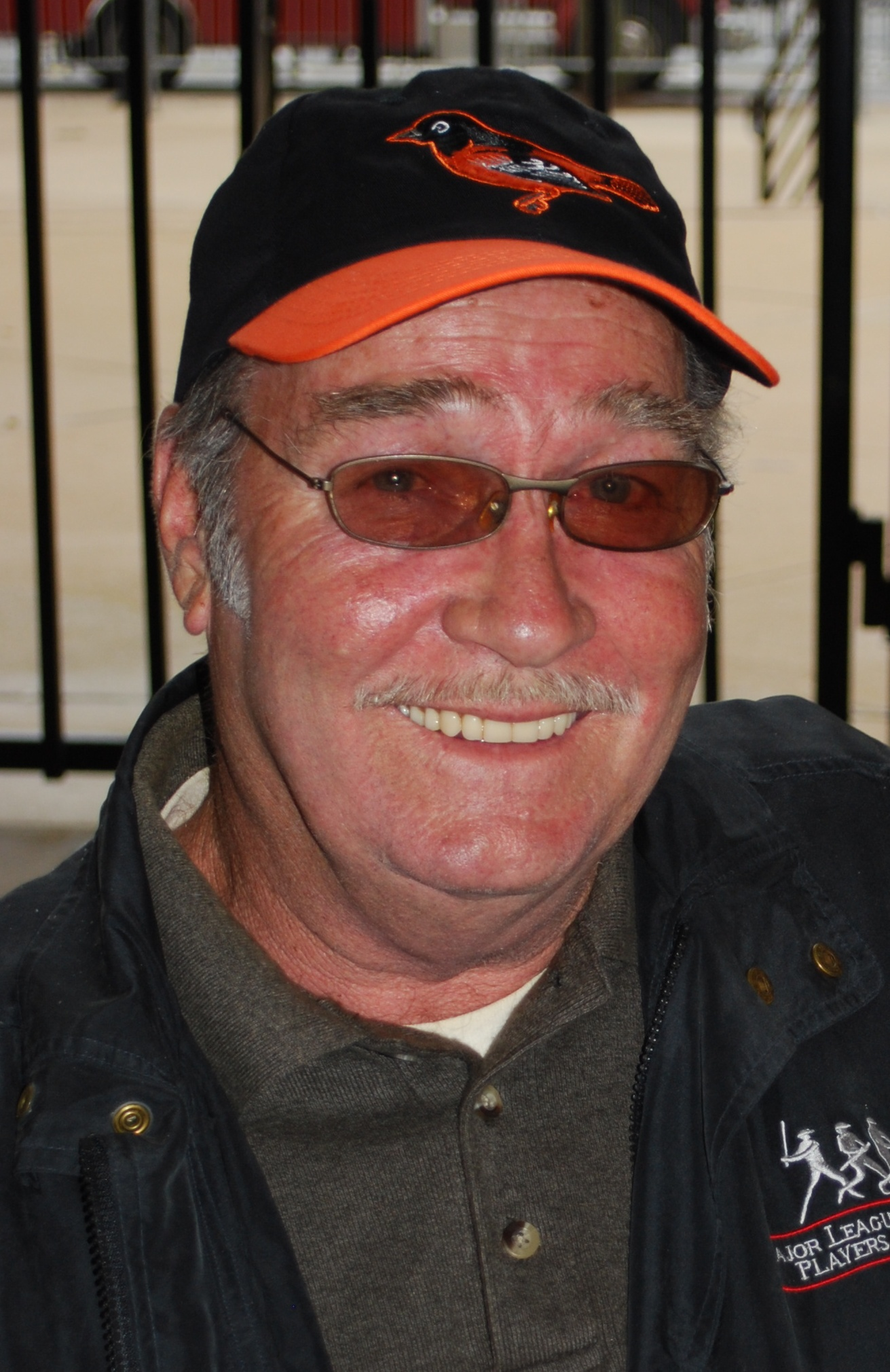
- Pitcher
- Born: January 20, 1945; Baltimore, Maryland, U.S.
- Died: June 11, 2012 (aged 67); Joppa, Maryland, U.S.
- Batted: Right Threw: Right

MLB debut
- September 18, 1964, for the Minnesota Twins

Last MLB appearance
- September 17, 1971, for the Baltimore Orioles

MLB statistics
- Win–loss record: 68–56
- Earned run average: 3.52
- Strikeouts: 882
- Stats at Baseball Reference

Teams
- Minnesota Twins (1964–1970); Detroit Tigers (1971); Baltimore Orioles (1971)

David Wilson Boswell (January 20, 1945 – June 11, 2012) was an American right-handed pitcher who spent eight seasons in Major League Baseball (MLB), all in the American League (AL), with the Minnesota Twins (1964–1970), Detroit Tigers, and Baltimore Orioles (both in 1971). He won twenty games as a starting pitcher during the 1969 season, the only time he achieved the feat during his major league career.

Boswell graduated from Calvert Hall College High School in 1963. He drew the interest of several major league teams. One was the hometown Orioles who had ranked him and Wally Bunker as the two best pitching prospects in the country. Not able to afford giving each of them huge signing bonuses, the ballclub only signed Bunker after being disappointed by Boswell's performance during his senior year. Boswell eventually signed with the Twins for US$15,000. Even though the New York Yankees had offered the same amount of money, he decided that his chances to make the majors were better with Minnesota.

After debuting with the Twins in 1965, Boswell pitched for the Twins in the team's World Series loss to the Los Angeles Dodgers. In 1966, Boswell's .706 winning percentage (based on a 12–5 record) led the American League. Following a 1969 game against the Detroit Tigers, Boswell got into a fight with teammate Bob Allison and Manager Billy Martin outside the Lindell AC bar near Tiger Stadium. After knocking out Allison with one punch, Boswell was in turn knocked out by Martin, resulting in a cut that required 20 stitches. Despite the off-field injury, Boswell would win 20 games in 1969, helping the Twins win the American League West.

During the American League Championship Series, Boswell lost 1–0 in 11 innings to Baltimore Orioles pitcher Dave McNally. He later revealed that he had suffered a career-ending arm injury during the game on a slider thrown to strike out slugger Frank Robinson in the bottom of the 10th.

"It felt like my shoulder went right into my jawbone," Boswell would tell the Fort Myers News-Press years later. "The arm would actually turn black and run all the way down to the elbow."

After being released by the Twins following the 1970 season, Boswell briefly played for the Detroit Tigers and the Baltimore Orioles during the 1971 season.

Boswell was the losing pitcher in Catfish Hunter's perfect game on May 8, 1968.

Boswell was a good hitting pitcher, posting a .202 batting average (74-for-367) with 41 runs, 4 home runs and 22 RBIs.

Boswell died of a heart attack at his Joppatowne, Maryland, home on June 11, 2012.
