= Charley Walters =

American baseball player (born 1947)

- Pitcher
- Born: February 21, 1947 (age 79); Minneapolis, Minnesota
- Batted: Right Threw: Right

MLB debut
- April 11, 1969, for the Minnesota Twins

Last MLB appearance
- May 14, 1969, for the Minnesota Twins

MLB statistics
- Earned run average: 5.40
- Record: 0-0
- Strikeouts: 2
- Stats at Baseball Reference

Teams
- Minnesota Twins (1969)

Charles Leonard Walters (born February 21, 1947) is a former Major League Baseball pitcher who played for the Minnesota Twins in 1969 and is currently a columnist and reporter for the Saint Paul Pioneer Press newspaper.

== Professional baseball ==
Walters had graduated from high school in 1965 and was playing Legion ball when his high school's assistant principal called to notify him that the Minnesota Twins were having an open tryout. Walters doubted that he would get a second look, but went to the tryout anyway. The Twins' chief scout, Angelo Giuliani, liked Walters' arm and team executive Joe Haynes offered Walters $400 per month and a $500 signing bonus to play minor league baseball. It took Walters four years to rise to the major leagues. In 1969 Twins manager Billy Martin elected to keep Walters on the team, and star player Bob Allison gave Walters the nickname "Big Shooter," which was later shortened to "Shooter." Walters pitched in six games in the major leagues, finishing with 6.2 innings pitched and a 5.40 ERA, 1 game finished, 6 hits, 4 runs, 4 earned runs, 1 home run, 3 base on balls, 2 strike outs and 1 hit batter. Defensively he had 1 assist.
