= Bob Miller (pitcher, born 1939) =

American baseball player (1939–1993)

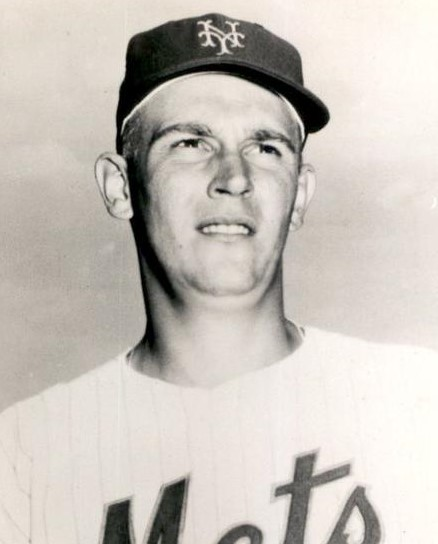
- Pitcher
- Born: February 18, 1939; St. Louis, Missouri, U.S.
- Died: August 6, 1993 (aged 54); Rancho Bernardo, California, U.S.
- Batted: Right Threw: Right

MLB debut
- June 26, 1957, for the St. Louis Cardinals

Last MLB appearance
- September 28, 1974, for the New York Mets

MLB statistics
- Win–loss record: 69–81
- Earned run average: 3.37
- Strikeouts: 895
- Stats at Baseball Reference

Teams
- St. Louis Cardinals (1957, 1959–1961); New York Mets (1962); Los Angeles Dodgers (1963–1967); Minnesota Twins (1968–1969); Cleveland Indians (1970); Chicago White Sox (1970); Chicago Cubs (1970–1971); San Diego Padres (1971); Pittsburgh Pirates (1971–1972); San Diego Padres (1973); Detroit Tigers (1973); New York Mets (1973–1974)

Career highlights and awards
- 3× World Series champion (1963, 1965, 1971)

Robert Lane Miller (February 18, 1939 – August 6, 1993) was an American professional baseball player. He played in Major League Baseball as a right-handed pitcher from 1957 to 1974. Miller played for three World Series champions: the 1963 Los Angeles Dodgers, 1965 Los Angeles Dodgers and the 1971 Pittsburgh Pirates—five league champions (the above three plus the 1966 Los Angeles Dodgers and the 1973 New York Mets) and four division winners, as well as for four teams that lost 100 or more games in a season.

Miller played for ten teams during his major league career, tying a modern-day record (since 1900) with Dick Littlefield that has since been broken. He played with three teams in each of three seasons: the Cleveland Indians, Chicago White Sox and Chicago Cubs in 1970; the Cubs, San Diego Padres and Pittsburgh Pirates in 1971; and the Padres, Detroit Tigers and New York Mets in 1973.

Steve Treder of the Hardball Times described Miller as a "whatever-is-needed utility pitcher". Former teammate Roy Hartsfield, who managed the Toronto Blue Jays when Miller was the team's pitching coach, called him "The Christian", a nickname he earned "because he suffers so much", noting that Miller was a part-time reliever with a sore arm, but that "when we came up with some other sore arms on the staff he would come in and suffer a few innings."

His 12 consecutive losses at the start of the 1962 season with the Mets stood as a club record until it was broken by Anthony Young in 1993.

== Before professional baseball ==
Miller was born in St. Louis, Missouri, as Robert Lane Gemeinweiser and later changed his last name to "Miller"; the circumstances of the name change are unknown. He attended Beaumont High School in St. Louis, where he had a 22–1 record pitching for the school's baseball team, including a perfect 12–0 record in his senior year. In the 1956 American Legion Baseball championships, Miller won all three games for the St. Louis Stockhams to lead the team to the national title.

== Major League Baseball career ==
=== St. Louis Cardinals (1957–61) ===
After graduating from high school as an 18-year-old, Miller was pursued by 15 major league teams and chose to sign as a "bonus baby" amateur free agent with the hometown St. Louis Cardinals on June 20, 1957, receiving a signing bonus estimated at $20,000. As required by the Bonus Rule as it existed when he was signed, the Cardinals had to immediately place Miller on their 40-man roster and keep him there for two years. Miller made his major league debut on June 26, less than a week after being signed to the team, pitching the final inning of an 11–3 loss to the Philadelphia Phillies, with Miller giving up three hits, three walks and three runs. Miller pitched in four more games in the 1957 season, seeing a total of nine innings of work, all in relief, ending with an earned run average (ERA) of 7.00.

With changes made to the Bonus Rule after the 1957 season, the Cardinals sent Miller down to the minor leagues. He began the 1958 season at the Triple-A Rochester Red Wings, but was sent down to the Double-A Houston Buffaloes, finishing the season there with an 8–11 record and an ERA of 3.54. He started the 1959 season in Rochester, pitching to an 8–12 record and a 3.50 ERA. He was promoted back to the Cardinals and appeared in 11 games, all but one as a starter, finishing with a 4–3 record and an ERA of 3.31 and threw three complete games.

In 15 games for the Cardinals in 1960 (starting seven), Miller ended the season with the same 4–3 record as the previous year, this time with an ERA of 3.42. He spent a brief injury-related stint with the Double-A Memphis Chicks of the Southern Association, where he had a 1–0 record and a 2.45 ERA in three games. Once being called back to the Cardinals, he was in the majors for the rest of his career.

He spent most of the 1961 season as a relief pitcher for the Cardinals, appearing in 34 games, all but five in relief, and ending the year with a 1–3 record and three saves, with a 4.24 ERA. Miller earned the first save of his career on September 20, 1961, pitching the final 2 2/3-innings of an 11–2 win by the Cardinals against the Los Angeles Dodgers at the Los Angeles Memorial Coliseum, called into the game with one out and bases loaded in the bottom of the seventh inning and getting Frank Howard to ground into a double play to end the inning and then pitching two perfect innings to earn the save.

=== New York Mets (1962) ===
In the 1961 MLB Expansion Draft held on October 10, 1961, the New York Mets picked Miller as one of three players they selected from the Cardinals, joining catcher Chris Cannizzaro and outfielder Jim Hickman. Miller was one of four players selected by the team from a premium pool of players at the top $125,000 draft price. One of two pitchers on the team's inaugural squad sharing the name Bob Miller, Mets manager Casey Stengel would call this Bob Miller by the name "Nelson", either out of confusion or in order to distinguish him from Bob G. Miller.

Miller was the starting pitcher on the losing end of a no-hitter pitched by Sandy Koufax of the Dodgers on June 30, 1962, a 5–0 Mets loss. Miller took the loss, his sixth of the season, after giving up four runs (all earned) on five hits and a walk in only 2/3 of an inning. In losing his first 12 decisions with the Mets, Miller tied a then-Major League record for losses by a pitcher at the start of the season. He ended the 1962 season with a 1–12 record in 33 games (21 as a starter), and a 4.89 ERA. Miller's only win that season came in a 2–1 victory over the Chicago Cubs at Wrigley Field on September 29 in the team's second from last game of the season, with Miller pitching his only complete game of the season, scattering seven hits and a walk, the only run scoring on a home run by Cubs first baseman Ernie Banks. His 12 wild pitches that season ranked him fifth in the National League, one ahead of Bob Gibson.

=== Los Angeles Dodgers (1963–67) ===
Miller was acquired by the Los Angeles Dodgers from the Mets for Larry Burright and Tim Harkness on 1 December 1962. On May 8, 1963, Stan Musial of the Cardinals hit a home run off of Miller in the fourth inning, giving Musial the 1,357th extra base hit of his career, breaking the major league record that had been held by Babe Ruth. In a game against the Milwaukee Braves on August 13, Warren Spahn struck out Miller for the 2,832nd strikeout of Spahn's career, setting a record for strikeouts by a left-handed pitcher that had been held by Rube Waddell since 1910. Miller finished the 1963 season with a 10–8 record and two saves in 42 appearances, an ERA of 2.89 and 125 strikeouts, the most wins in a season in his major league career and the only time he exceeded 100 strikeouts. His 23 games as starter represented the majority of his appearances and was his only season with the Dodgers in which he was primarily a starter; Miller was used primarily as a reliever and had only seven starts in his remaining four seasons with the team. Miller did not play in the Dodgers four-game sweep of the New York Yankees in the 1963 World Series.

He had a 7–7 record and nine saves in 74 appearances (all but two in relief) and a 2.62 ERA in 1964. His 74 appearances in 1964 were the most of any pitcher in the National League that season.

He had a 6–7 record and nine saves in 61 appearances and a 2.97 ERA in 1965. His first postseason appearance came in relief in two games as part of the Dodgers' 1965 World Series victory in seven games over the Minnesota Twins. Miller pitched in the eighth inning of the second and sixth games of the series, both of which were 5–1 losses to the Twins.

Miller had a 4–2 record and five saves in 45 relief appearances and a 2.77 ERA in 1966. In the 1966 World Series, in which the Baltimore Orioles swept the Dodgers in four games, Miller appeared in the fifth inning of the first game and pitched three innings in relief after starter Don Drysdale gave up four runs in the game's first two innings.

In the 1967 season, Miller had a 2–9 record with no saves in 52 appearances, with his ERA climbing to 4.31.

Miller gave up no runs in any of his World Series appearances with the Dodgers.

=== Minnesota Twins (1968–69) ===
The Dodgers traded Miller on November 28, 1967, to the Minnesota Twins, together with Ron Perranoski and John Roseboro, in exchange for Mudcat Grant and Zoilo Versalles, in a trade made at baseball's winter meeting held in Mexico City. Miller had an 0–3 record and two saves in 45 appearances (all in relief) and an ERA of 2.74 in the 1968 season.

In 1969, Miller ended with a 5–5 record and three saves in 48 appearances (including 11 starts) with a 3.02 ERA. The Twins faced the Baltimore Orioles in the 1969 American League Championship Series, the first year of intraleague playoffs with the split of each league into Eastern and Western divisions. In the best three-out-of-five format, the Twins lost the first two games and called on Miller to start game three. Miller faced off against Jim Palmer, but lasted only 1 2/3 innings, giving up five hits and three runs (only one of them earned) before being removed by manager Billy Martin.

=== Indians / White Sox / Cubs (1970) ===
Miller's journeyman travels started when he was traded by the Twins to the Cleveland Indians on December 10, 1969, together with Dean Chance, Graig Nettles and Ted Uhlaender, in exchange for Luis Tiant and Stan Williams. He appeared in 15 games for the Indians at the start of the 1970, all but two in relief, ending with a 2–2 record and one save and an ERA of 4.18.

He was dealt along with Barry Moore from the Indians to the White Sox for Buddy Bradford and Tommie Sisk before the trade deadline on June 15, 1970. He pitched in 15 games for the White Sox, all but three as a starter, and ended his time there with a 4–6 record and a 5.01 ERA.

On September 1, 1970, he was purchased by the crosstown Chicago Cubs from the White Sox for an amount described by The Washington Post as being well above the $20,000 waivers price. In his second game with the Cubs, Miller earned a save against the Mets, facing the final five batters in a 7–4 Cubs victory. Miller appeared in seven games for the Cubs, ending with no decisions and two saves in nine innings of work, and the Cubs fell short in their bid for a playoff spot.

=== Cubs / Padres / Pirates (1971) ===
Miller started the 1971 season with the Cubs, and pitched in two games for the team before being released on May 10, 1971.

He was signed as a free agent the next day by the San Diego Padres. In 38 games with the Padres, all in relief, Miller had a 7–3 record and seven saves and an ERA of 1.41.

The Padres were in last place in the National League West with a 42–76 record, 26 1/2 games out of first place, and traded Miller to the National League East division-leading Pittsburgh Pirates on August 10, 1971, for Johnny Jeter and Ed Acosta. Miller continued his success in the bullpen, ending the season with the Pirates with a 1–2 record and three saves in 16 appearances, all in relief, finishing with a 1.29 ERA. Miller pitched the second game of the 1971 National League Championship Series, entering in the sixth inning and giving up three hits, three walks and two runs in three innings of work in a game in which the Pirates held on to defeat the San Francisco Giants by a final score of 9–4. He pitched in relief in three games in the 1971 World Series against the Baltimore Orioles that the Pirates won in seven games, appearing in relief in all three Pirate losses (in the first, second and sixth games of the series), taking the loss in Game 6 when he gave up a sacrifice fly to Brooks Robinson that brought in the winning run.

=== Pittsburgh Pirates (1972) ===
Miller stuck with the Pirates for the entire 1972 season, finishing with a 5–2 record and three saves in 36 appearances (all in relief) and an ERA of 2.65. He pitched in game four of the 1972 National League Championship Series, appearing in the ninth inning of a 7–1 loss to the Cincinnati Reds, retiring all three batters he faced in a series that the Pirates lost in five games.

=== Padres / Tigers / Mets (1973) ===
Miller was released by the Pittsburgh Pirates on March 27, 1973, and signed as a free agent with the San Diego Padres on April 2, 1973. In his brief second stint with the Padres, he appeared in 18 games, all in relief, had no decisions and a 4.11 ERA.

He was selected off waivers by the Detroit Tigers from the Padres on June 22, 1973. With the Tigers, he had a 4–2 record and one save in 22 games (all in relief) and a 3.43 ERA.

He was purchased by the New York Mets from the Tigers on September 23, 1973, appearing in one game for the Mets in their push for the playoffs. The Mets made it to the 1973 World Series, losing to the Oakland Athletics in seven games, but Miller was not placed on the postseason roster, as he had joined the team too late in the season.

=== New York Mets (1974) ===
Miller stuck with the Mets for the 1974 season, ending with a 2–2 record, two saves and a 3.58 ERA in 58 appearances, all in relief. His final appearance was on September 28, 1974, in a 7–3 loss to the Pirates, with Miller getting the last two outs of the fifth inning in relief of starter Tug McGraw.

He was released by the Mets on October 1, 1974.

=== Career statistics ===
Career Pitching
W	L	G	GS	CG	SHO	GF	Sv	IP	H	R	ER	HR	BB	K	HBP	ERA	WHIP
69	81	694	99	7	0	290	51	1551.1	1487	679	581	101	608	895	32	3.37	1.350

== Later career ==
In 1976, Miller was named as manager of the Amarillo Gold Sox, the double-A Texas League affiliate of the San Diego Padres. He led the team to a first-place finish with an 81–54 record, and won the league championship over the Shreveport Captains, a Pittsburgh Pirates affiliate, winning the best-of-five series in five games.

With another round of expansion in the major leagues in 1977, Miller was named as the pitching coach for the Toronto Blue Jays, where his pitching staff included a large number of rookies, and veteran players including former star Bill Singer, a two-time 20-game winner, and journeyman Chuck Hartenstein. Miller spent three seasons with Toronto, helping to develop future stars Dave Stieb and Pete Vuckovich. Five pitchers he coached while with the Blue Jays would themselves become major league pitching coaches, including Joe Coleman, Hartenstein, Dyar Miller, Dave Wallace and Mark Wiley.

He was the pitching coach for the San Francisco Giants in 1985, but after the team ended the season with 99 losses, the team fired the entire coaching staff, offering Miller a position as pitching coach with the team's top minor league affiliates. Miller spent time as a scout, evaluating prospective pitchers for the Giants.

Miller, then an advance scout for the Giants, died of injuries sustained in a collision with another vehicle in Rancho Bernardo, California, near San Diego. He was driving with his mother, Norma Jean Miller, who was left in serious condition from the accident.

Miller, who lived in Scottsdale, Arizona, was survived by his wife, Judy, and a daughter, Kriskine.

Preceded by Claude Osteen	Los Angeles Dodgers Opening Day; Starting pitcher 1967	Succeeded by Claude Osteen
Preceded by n/a	Toronto Blue Jays pitching coach 1977–1979	Succeeded by Al Widmar
Preceded by Herm Starrette	San Francisco Giants pitching coach 1985	Succeeded by Norm Sherry
