= Rick Renick =

American baseball player (1944–2026)

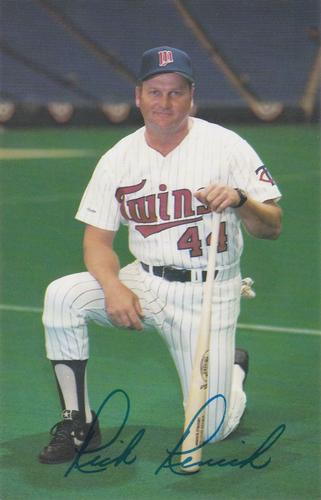
- Renick in 1987 during his coaching tenure with the Minnesota Twins
- Infielder, outfielder
- Born: March 16, 1944; London, Ohio, U.S.
- Died: January 31, 2026 (aged 81)
- Batted: Right Threw: Right

MLB debut
- July 11, 1968, for the Minnesota Twins

Last MLB appearance
- October 2, 1972, for the Minnesota Twins

MLB statistics
- Batting average: .221
- Home runs: 20
- Runs batted in: 71
- Stats at Baseball Reference

Teams
- As player: Minnesota Twins (1968–1972); As coach: Kansas City Royals (1981); Montreal Expos (1985–1986; 2001); Minnesota Twins (1987–1990); Pittsburgh Pirates (1997–2000); Florida Marlins (2002)

Career highlights and awards
- World Series champion (1987)

Warren Richard Renick (/ˈrɛnɪk/ REN-ik; March 16, 1944 – January 31, 2026) was an American professional baseball player, manager and coach. Renick had a 14-year (1965–1978) professional playing career, including all or part of five seasons (1968–1972) in Major League Baseball as a third baseman, left fielder and shortstop for the Minnesota Twins. He threw and batted right-handed and was listed as 6 feet (1.8 m) tall and 188 pounds (85 kg).

== Playing career ==
Renick graduated from Madison South High School in his hometown of London, Ohio, attended Ohio State University, and signed with the Twins in 1964, the year before the institution of the Major League Baseball draft. In 1968, he was recalled from Triple-A Denver in midyear, and in his debut major league at bat on July 11, he homered off Mickey Lolich, ace left-hander of the Detroit Tigers. The blow helped Minnesota win the game, 5–4. Renick started in 30 games at shortstop during the season's final three months.

Beginning in 1969, he was a backup third baseman and outfielder for Minnesota, setting career bests in games played (81), hits (41), doubles (eight), home runs (seven) and runs batted in in 1970. Overall, he batted .221 lifetime with 122 career hits, 42 of them for extra bases. In the field, he appeared in 71 games (65 games started) at third base, 63 games (37 starts) in the outfield, and 48 games (33) at shortstop. Although Minnesota sent him to the minor leagues at the end of the 1972 season, Renick continued his active career through 1978, playing his final two seasons in the Montreal Expos' organization.

== Coach and manager ==
In 1979, Renick began his coaching and managing career, starting as a minor league batting instructor in the Kansas City Royals' system. For 13 years between 1981 and 2002, he was a member of the major league coaching staffs of the Royals, Expos, Twins (including serving as third-base coach for the 1987 World Series champions), Pittsburgh Pirates, and Florida Marlins. He also managed in the high minors for the Expos and Chicago White Sox; as skipper of the Triple-A Nashville Sounds, Renick was named American Association Manager of the Year in 1993 and 1996.

== Death ==
Renick died on January 31, 2026, at the age of 81.
