= Ron Perranoski =

American baseball player and coach (1936–2020)

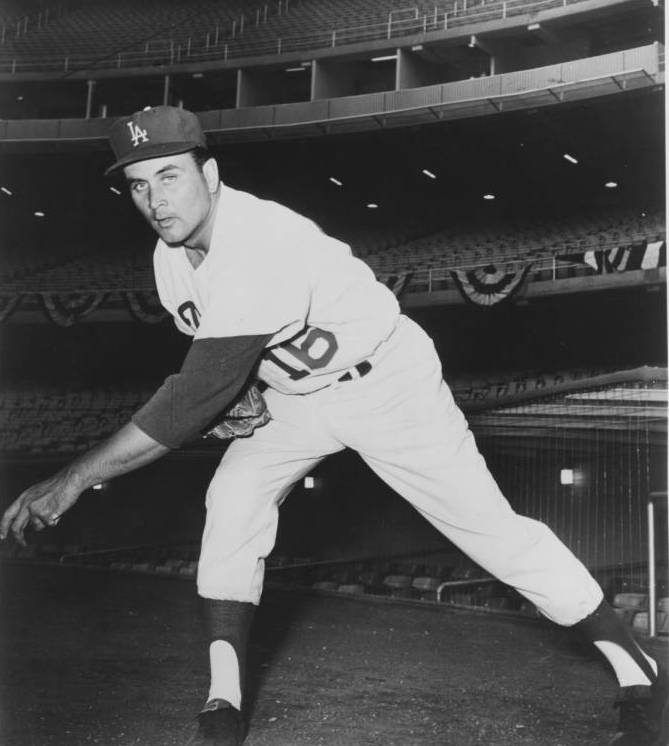
- Pitcher
- Born: April 1, 1936; Paterson, New Jersey, U.S.
- Died: October 2, 2020 (aged 84); Vero Beach, Florida, U.S.
- Batted: Left Threw: Left

MLB debut
- April 14, 1961, for the Los Angeles Dodgers

Last MLB appearance
- June 17, 1973, for the California Angels

MLB statistics
- Win–loss record: 79–74
- Earned run average: 2.79
- Strikeouts: 687
- Saves: 178
- Stats at Baseball Reference

Teams
- As player: Los Angeles Dodgers (1961–1967); Minnesota Twins (1968–1971); Detroit Tigers (1971–1972); Los Angeles Dodgers (1972); California Angels (1973); As coach: Los Angeles Dodgers (1981–1994); San Francisco Giants (1997–1999)

Career highlights and awards
- 4× World Series champion (1963, 1965, 1981, 1988); 2× AL saves leader (1969, 1970)

Ronald Peter Perranoski (April 1, 1936 – October 2, 2020) was an American professional baseball player and coach. He played in Major League Baseball as a left-handed relief pitcher from 1961 to 1973, most prominently as a member of the Los Angeles Dodgers for whom he appeared in three World Series and, with the Minnesota Twins teams that won two consecutive American League Western Division titles. He also played for the Detroit Tigers and the California Angels. After his playing career, Perranoski worked as a Major League pitching coach, winning two more World Series with the Dodgers in the 1980s.

== Early life and college ==
Perranoski was born in Paterson, New Jersey and grew up in Fair Lawn, New Jersey, where he attended Fair Lawn High School, (1952-54) and pitched on its state champion baseball team. He also played on the basketball team. As a child attending Yankees games, he was inspired by watching Yankees pitcher Joe Page to want to become a relief pitcher.

Perranoski attended Michigan State University, where he was a teammate and friend of Dick Radatz, who also would become a standout reliever in the 1960s.

== Professional playing career ==
Perranoski was signed as an amateur free agent by the Chicago Cubs on June 9, 1958.

=== Minor leagues ===
The Cubs assigned him to the Class B Burlington Bees, where he started 13 of the 18 games in which he appeared, with a 5–9 won–loss record and 6.43 earned run average (ERA). He spent 1959 with the Double-A San Antonio Missions, starting 26 games, with an 11–10 record and 3.12 ERA.

Before the start of the 1960 season, the Cubs traded Perranoski to the Dodgers, along with Johnny Goryl, Lee Handley and $25,000 for Don Zimmer. Perranoski had just finished six months in the Army, and Dodgers general manager Buzzy Bavasi had never seen him play, but decided to take a chance on Perranoski as the third player in the Zimmer trade because Perranoski had received a substantial bonus from the Cubs which gave him potential worth in Bavasi's eyes. In 1960, he pitched for two different Dodger Triple-A affiliates, with a combined 12–11 record and 2.58 ERA. Unlike his earlier years, Perranoski pitched the majority of his games as a relief pitcher, starting only 18 of the 57 games in which he appeared.

=== Major leagues ===
==== Los Angeles Dodgers ====
In his rookie season with the Dodgers (1961), Perranoski pitched 52 games in relief, with one start. He was 7–5 with a 2.68 ERA and six saves in 91.2 innings pitched. In 1962, he led all major league pitchers in games pitched (70) and was tied for third in saves (19), behind Roy Face (28) and old friend Radatz (24). He was 6–6 with a 2.85 ERA, and pitched 107.1 innings, all in relief.

In 1963, Perranoski appeared in 69 games, saved 21 games, had a 1.67 ERA, and won 16 of 19 relief decisions for the Los Angeles Dodgers, who went on to win that year's World Series in four consecutive games over the New York Yankees. He appeared in Game 2 of that Series and earned a save in relief of Johnny Podres. Perranoski led the National League in pitching appearances and was second in saves, behind only Lindy McDaniel's 22 saves. He was fourth in the NL Most Valuable Player (MVP) voting.

In 1964, Perranoski had a career high 72 pitching appearances, but his ERA rose to rose to 3.09, with 14 saves and a 5–7 record. He improved the following year with a 2.24 ERA, 18 saves and a 6–6 record in 59 games. Perranoski would again pitch in and win the 1965 World Series with the Dodgers over the Minnesota Twins. He relieved in two games without a decision or save, giving up three runs in 3.2 innings.

He returned with the Dodgers to the 1966 World Series, but lost to the Baltimore Orioles in four straight games. Perranoski pitched in 55 games that year with a 6–7 record and 3.18 ERA, but only had six saves; as Phil Regan became the Dodgers primary closer, pitching in 65 games with 21 saves and a 1.62 ERA. Perranoski pitched in two 1966 World Series games, with no decisions or saves, giving up two runs in 3.1 innings. He had a good year in 1967, leading the NL in pitching appearances (70), with a 2.45 ERA and 16 saves, but the Dodgers fell into eighth place.

==== Minnesota Twins ====
After the 1967 season ended, the Dodgers traded Perranoski to the Minnesota Twins, along with John Roseboro and Bob Miller for Jim "Mudcat" Grant (who Perranoski pitched against in Game 1 of the 1965 World Series) and Zoilo Versalles (who hit a triple against Perranoski in Game 2 of the 1965 World Series). In his first year with the Twins, Perranoski led them in games pitched (66) and was 8–7 with a 3.10 ERA and six saves; but reliever Al Worthington led team with a league-leading 18 saves and a 2.71 ERA.

Perranoski had two more exceptional seasons in his career, 1969-70. He was named the Sporting News Reliever of the Year for the American League in both 1969 and 1970 while pitching for the Twins. He led all major league pitchers in saves in 1969 with 31, and led the American League in 1970 with a career-high 34, only one save behind Wayne Granger's major league best 35 saves that year. His ERAs in 1969-70 were 2.11 and 2.43 respectively. In 1969, he was 13th in AL MVP voting, and in 1970 was 12th in MVP voting and 7th in voting for the Cy Young Award.

His Twins teams won the AL Western Division each of those years, but lost to the Orioles in the playoffs both times, three games to none. In the 1969 American League Championship Series (ALCS), Perranoski pitched in all three ALCS games, losing Game 1 in the bottom of the 12th inning after pitching 3.2 innings in relief of Jim Perry, when Paul Blair laid down a bunt to score Mark Belanger from third base. Perranoski and his manager Billy Martin said there was nothing that could be done because it was a perfect bunt. He pitched two games in the 1970 ALCS, but was ineffective, giving up five runs in 2.1 innings pitched.

==== Final years pitching ====
After pitching in 36 games for the Twins with a 6.75 ERA in 1971, he was waived by the Twins in July and claimed by the Tigers. He pitched only 18 innings in 11 games for the Tigers, but had a 2.50 ERA and two saves. In 1972, his ERA ballooned to 7.71, and the Tigers released him at the end of July. The Dodgers signed him in early August, and he appeared in nine games with a 2.70 ERA, but was released after the season ended. He ended his career with the California Angels in 1973, but played only sparingly.

==== Career ====
In 13 seasons, Perranoski appeared in 737 major league games (only once as a starter), pitching 1,174.2 innings, with a 2.79 lifetime ERA. His record was 79–74, with 178 saves. He averaged 5.3 strikeouts per nine innings, 3.6 bases on ball per nine innings, and .4 home runs per nine innings.

== Coaching career ==
After his playing career ended, Perranoski was the Dodgers' minor league pitching coordinator (1973 or 1975–80), then the MLB pitching coach for Los Angeles for 14 seasons (1981–94). During this time, the Dodgers ranked first or second eight times in the NL and led all of major league baseball in ERA in 1982-83, 1985, 1989 and 1991. He joined the San Francisco Giants as minor league pitching coordinator in 1995, was promoted to bench coach for manager Dusty Baker in 1997 and then to pitching coach in 1998-99. He was succeeded as the Giants pitching coach by Dave Righetti, who had great success with the Giants and considered Perranoski his mentor. He had been a special assistant to general manager Brian Sabean since 2000.

== Honors ==
In 1983, Perranoski was inducted into the National Polish-American Sports Hall of Fame.

== Personal life ==
On June 6, 1964, Fair Lawn honored him with a Ron Perranoski Day, including 1,000 Fair Lawn residents honoring him before a Dodgers-Mets game at Shea Stadium, followed by a dinner in Fair Lawn later that evening. A Ron Perranoski Scholarship Fund was created for deserving high school candidates who had an interest in baseball and wanted to attend college.

In 1965, Perranoski appeared in an episode of the television series Branded ("Coward Step Aside", S1, Ep 7) with former baseball player and series star Chuck Connors.

== Death ==
Perranoski died in his home in Vero Beach, Florida, on October 2, 2020, following complications from a long illness.

== See also ==
- List of Major League Baseball annual saves leaders

Sporting positions
Preceded by Red Adams	Los Angeles Dodgers Pitching coach 1981–1994	Succeeded by Dave Wallace
