= Rich Reese =

American baseball player (born 1941)

- First baseman
- Born: September 29, 1941 (age 84); Leipsic, Ohio, U.S.
- Batted: Left Threw: Left

MLB debut
- September 4, 1964, for the Minnesota Twins

Last MLB appearance
- September 29, 1973, for the Minnesota Twins

MLB statistics
- Batting average: .253
- Home runs: 52
- Runs batted in: 245
- Stats at Baseball Reference

Teams
- Minnesota Twins (1964–1972); Detroit Tigers (1973); Minnesota Twins (1973)

Richard Benjamin Reese (born September 29, 1941) is an American former professional baseball player who played first base and outfield in the major leagues from 1964 through 1973 for the Minnesota Twins and Detroit Tigers. Born in Leipsic, Ohio, Reese threw and batted left-handed, stood 6 feet 3 inches (1.91 m) tall and weighed 185 pounds (84 kg). He attended Deshler, Ohio, high school.

Reese's pro career began in the Detroit organization and he appeared in 59 games for the Tigers in his final MLB season in 1973, but he spent the bulk of his big-league tenure—807 games played—as a member of the Twins, who drafted him away from the Tigers in November 1962. In his finest season, 1969, Reese batted a career-best .322 in 132 games, with 16 home runs and 69 runs batted in, also personal bests. He tied for the American League lead in pinch hits with 13 in 1967. He is also the co-holder of the major league record for pinch-hit grand slam home runs in a career with three. One of those pinch-hit slams, on August 3, 1969, snapped the Baltimore Orioles' Dave McNally's consecutive win streak at 17, one short of the American League record.

Reese is also in the record books for two strikeouts: as the final out in Catfish Hunter's perfect game on May 8, 1968, and as Nolan Ryan's 383rd strikeout victim of the 1973 season (September 27), the still-standing single-season record, breaking Sandy Koufax's record of 382 in 1965.

In 866 games over ten seasons, Reese compiled a .253 batting average (512-for-2,020) with 248 runs, 73 doubles, 17 triples, 52 home runs, 245 RBI, 158 base on balls, 270 strikeouts, .312 on-base percentage and .384 slugging percentage. Defensively, he recorded a .992 fielding percentage at first base and left field. In the postseason, in the 1969 and 1970 American League Championship Series, he appeared in five games and hit .158 (3-for-19) with two runs batted in.

Reese went on to a career in the distilled spirits industry, retiring in 2003 as CEO of Jim Beam Brands headquartered in the Chicago suburb of Deerfield, Illinois.
