= 1970 California Angels season =

Major League Baseball season

1970 California Angels
- League: American League
- Division: West
- Ballpark: Anaheim Stadium
- City: Anaheim, California
- Record: 86–76 (.531)
- Divisional place: 3rd
- Owner: Gene Autry
- General manager: Dick Walsh
- Manager: Lefty Phillips
- Television: KTLA
- Radio: KMPC (Dick Enberg, Don Wells, Dave Niehaus, Jerry Coleman)
- Stats: ESPN.com; Baseball Reference

The 1970 California Angels season was the 10th season of the Angels franchise in the American League, the 5th in Anaheim, and their 5th season playing their home games at Anaheim Stadium. The Angels finished the season third in the American League West with a record of 86 wins and 76 losses.

== Offseason ==
- October 22, 1969: Rubén Amaro Sr. was released by the Angels.
- October 24, 1969: Mel Queen was purchased by the Angels from the Cincinnati Reds.
- November 25, 1969: Pedro Borbón, Vern Geishert and Jim McGlothlin were traded by the Angels to the Cincinnati Reds for Alex Johnson and Chico Ruiz.
- January 14, 1970: Bill Harrelson and Dan Loomer (minors) were traded by the Angels to the Cincinnati Reds for Jack Fisher.

== Regular season ==
Coming off a 71–91 1969 season, the Angels rebounded to finish 86–76, tying their 1962 season as their best in franchise history up to that point. As of 2024, this is the only season that saw the Angels hold a winning record for all 162 games of a season, starting the season 5–0 and never falling back to .500 from there on.

On July 3, Clyde Wright pitched a 3-walk no-hitter against the Athletics, the first no-hitter at Anaheim Stadium since its first game in 1966. Wright would go on to be only the 2nd 20-win starter in franchise history that year and finished 6th in Cy Young voting. His 22 wins that year are a franchise record as of 2024, tied with Nolan Ryan's 1972 season.

Throughout the year, Alex Johnson was involved in a tight batting race with Carl Yastrzemski, Tony Oliva, and Luis Aparicio. After 161 games, Johnson was trailing Yastrzemski by only .0013. On the last day of the season, Johnson went 2 for 3 against the White Sox, legging out an infield single on his 3rd at-bat to beat Yastrzemski by .0004. As of 2024, Johnson is the only batting champion for the Angels.

The Angels remained in the American League West race throughout the season, and by September 3, they were only 3 games back of the division lead heading into a 3-game set against the division-leading Twins in Anaheim. However, after being swept by them, the Angels collapsed, losing their next 6 in a row and going 5-17 from September 4 to September 26 to fall out of the postseason race for good. According to Alex Johnson, it was as though the team gave up on the season following being swept by the Twins.

=== Season standings ===
AL West
Team	W	L	Pct.	GB	Home	Road
Minnesota Twins	98	64	.605	—	51‍–‍30	47‍–‍34
Oakland Athletics	89	73	.549	9	49‍–‍32	40‍–‍41
California Angels	86	76	.531	12	43‍–‍38	43‍–‍38
Kansas City Royals	65	97	.401	33	35‍–‍44	30‍–‍53
Milwaukee Brewers	65	97	.401	33	38‍–‍42	27‍–‍55
Chicago White Sox	56	106	.346	42	31‍–‍53	25‍–‍53

=== Record vs. opponents ===
1970 American League record Sources:
Team	BAL	BOS	CAL	CWS	CLE	DET	KC	MIL	MIN	NYY	OAK	WAS
Baltimore	—	13–5	7–5	9–3	14–4	11–7	12–0	7–5	5–7	11–7	7–5	12–6
Boston	5–13	—	5–7	8–4	12–6	9–9	7–5	5–7	7–5	10–8	7–5	12–6
California	5–7	7–5	—	12–6	6–6	6–6	10–8	12–6	8–10	5–7	8–10	7–5
Chicago	3–9	4–8	6–12	—	6–6	6–6	7–11	7–11	6–12	5–7	2–16	4–8
Cleveland	4–14	6–12	6–6	6–6	—	7–11	8–4	7–5	6–6	8–10	7–5	11–7
Detroit	7–11	9–9	6–6	6–6	11–7	—	6–6	8–4	4–8	7–11	6–6	9–9
Kansas City	0–12	5–7	8–10	11–7	4–8	6–6	—	12–6	5–13	1–11	7–11	6–6
Milwaukee	5–7	7–5	6–12	11–7	5–7	4–8	6–12	—	5–13	3–9–1	8–10	5–7
Minnesota	7–5	5–7	10–8	12–6	6–6	8–4	13–5	13–5	—	5–7	13–5	6–6
New York	7–11	8–10	7–5	7–5	10–8	11–7	11–1	9–3–1	7–5	—	6–6	10–8
Oakland	5–7	5–7	10–8	16–2	5–7	6–6	11–7	10–8	5–13	6–6	—	10–2
Washington	6–12	6–12	5–7	8–4	7–11	9–9	6–6	7–5	6–6	8–10	2–10	—

=== Notable transactions ===
- April 7, 1970: Jack Fisher was released by the Angels.
- April 27, 1970: Aurelio Rodríguez and Rick Reichardt were traded by the Angels to the Washington Senators for Ken McMullen.
- June 4, 1970: Mike Krukow was drafted by the Angels in the 32nd round of the 1970 Major League Baseball draft, but did not sign.
- August 31, 1970: Tony González was purchased by the Angels from the Atlanta Braves.

=== Roster ===
1970 California Angels
Roster
Pitchers: 40 Lloyd Allen; 29 Tom Bradley; 26,48 Terry Cox; 48 Paul Doyle; 24 Eddie Fisher; 43 Greg Garrett; 39 Steve Kealey; 37 Dave LaRoche; 34 Rudy May; 47 Andy Messersmith; 41 Tom Murphy; 46 Mel Queen; 42 Harvey Shank; 19 Ken Tatum; 39 Wally Wolf; 38 Clyde Wright	Catchers: 2 Joe Azcue; 28 Randy Brown; 30 Tom Egan; Infielders: 4 Sandy Alomar Sr.; 11 Jim Fregosi; 44 Doug Griffin; 7 Ken McMullen; 1,42 Ray Oyler; 42 Marty Perez; 1 Aurelio Rodríguez; 15 Chico Ruiz; 9 Jim Spencer	Outfielders: 14 Billy Cowan; 25 Tony González; 17 Alex Johnson; 10 Jay Johnstone; 3 Rick Reichardt; 6 Roger Repoz; 5 Tommie Reynolds; 3 Mickey Rivers; 33 Tom Silverio; 8 Jarvis Tatum; 32 Bill Voss; Other batters: 5 Jim Hicks	Manager: 36 Lefty Phillips; Coaches: 22 Rocky Bridges; 20 Fred Koenig; 7,27 Pete Reiser; 21 Norm Sherry

== Player stats ==
=== Batting ===
==== Starters by position ====
Note: Pos = Position; G = Games played; AB = At bats; H = Hits; Avg. = Batting average; HR = Home runs; RBI = Runs batted in

Pos	Player	G	AB	H	Avg.	HR	RBI
C	Joe Azcue	114	351	85	.242	2	25
1B	Jim Spencer	146	511	140	.274	12	68
2B	Sandy Alomar Sr.	162	672	169	.251	2	36
SS	Jim Fregosi	158	601	167	.278	22	82
3B	Ken McMullen	124	422	98	.232	14	61
LF	Alex Johnson	156	614	202	.329	14	86
CF	Jay Johnstone	119	320	76	.238	11	39
RF	Roger Repoz	137	407	97	.238	18	47

==== Other batters ====
Note: G = Games played; AB = At bats; H = Hits; Avg. = Batting average; HR = Home runs; RBI = Runs batted in

Player	G	AB	H	Avg.	HR	RBI
Tom Egan	79	210	50	.238	4	20
Bill Voss	80	181	44	.243	3	30
Jarvis Tatum	75	181	43	.238	0	6
Billy Cowan	68	134	37	.276	5	25
Tommie Reynolds	59	120	30	.250	1	6
Chico Ruiz	68	107	26	.243	0	12
Tony González	26	92	28	.304	1	12
Aurelio Rodríguez	17	63	17	.270	0	7
Doug Griffin	18	55	7	.127	0	4
Mickey Rivers	17	25	8	.320	0	3
Ray Oyler	24	24	2	.083	0	1
Tom Silverio	15	15	0	.000	0	0
Rick Reichardt	9	6	1	.167	0	1
Randy Brown	5	4	0	.000	0	0
Jim Hicks	4	4	1	.250	0	0
Marty Perez	3	3	0	.000	0	1

=== Pitching ===
==== Starting pitchers ====
Note: G = Games pitched; IP = Innings pitched; W = Wins; L = Losses; ERA = Earned run average; SO = Strikeouts

Player	G	IP	W	L	ERA	SO
Clyde Wright	39	260.2	22	12	2.83	110
Tom Murphy	39	227.0	16	13	4.24	99
Rudy May	38	208.2	7	13	4.01	164
Andy Messersmith	37	194.2	11	10	3.01	62

==== Other pitchers ====
Note: G = Games pitched; IP = Innings pitched; W = Wins; L = Losses; ERA = Earned run average; SO = Strikeouts

Player	G	IP	W	L	ERA	SO
Greg Garrett	32	74.2	5	6	2.65	53
Tom Bradley	17	69.2	2	5	4.13	53
Lloyd Allen	8	24.0	1	1	2.62	12

==== Relief pitchers ====
Note: G = Games pitched; W = Wins; L = Losses; SV = Saves; ERA = Earned run average; SO = Strikeouts

Player	G	W	L	SV	ERA	SO
Ken Tatum	62	7	4	17	2.94	50
Eddie Fisher	67	4	4	8	3.04	74
Paul Doyle	40	3	1	5	5.14	34
Dave LaRoche	38	4	1	4	3.44	44
Mel Queen	34	3	6	9	4.20	44
Steve Kealey	17	1	0	1	4.15	14
Wally Wolf	4	0	0	0	5.06	5
Terry Cox	3	0	0	0	3.86	3
Harvey Shank	1	0	0	0	0.00	1

== Farm system ==
Level	Team	League	Manager
AAA	Hawaii Islanders	Pacific Coast League	Chuck Tanner
AA	El Paso Sun Kings	Texas League	Del Rice
A	Quad Cities Angels	Midwest League	Mike Stubbins
Rookie	Idaho Falls Angels	Pioneer League	Bob Clear

LEAGUE CHAMPIONS: Idaho Falls

Records
Preceded by 1969	California Angels seasons 1970	Succeeded by 1971
