= 1971 in baseball =

The following are the baseball events of the year 1971 throughout the world.

== Champions ==
=== Major League Baseball ===
National League: Pittsburgh Pirates

American League: Baltimore Orioles

1971 World Series: Pittsburgh (NL) def. Baltimore (AL), 4 games to 3.

Inter-league playoff: Pittsburgh (NL) declined challenge by Tokyo Yomiuri Giants.

- World Series MVP: Roberto Clemente
- All-Star Game, July 13 at Tiger Stadium: American League, 6–4; Frank Robinson, MVP

=== Other champions ===
- Amateur World Series: Cuba
- College World Series: USC
- Japan Series: Yomiuri Giants over Hankyu Braves (4–1)
- Big League World Series: District 44 LL, Cupertino, California
- Little League World Series: Tainan, Taiwan
- Senior League World Series: La Habra, California
- Pan American Games: Cuba over United States

Winter Leagues

- 1971 Caribbean Series: Tigres del Licey
- Dominican Republic League: Tigres del Licey
- Mexican Pacific League: Naranjeros de Hermosillo
- Puerto Rican League: Cangrejeros de Santurce
- Venezuelan League: Tiburones de La Guaira

== Awards and honors ==
- Baseball Hall of Fame
  - Dave Bancroft
  - Jake Beckley
  - Chick Hafey
  - Harry Hooper
  - Joe Kelley
  - Rube Marquard
  - Satchel Paige
  - George Weiss (executive)

Baseball Writers' Association of America Awards
BBWAA Award	National League	American League
Rookie of the Year	Chris Chambliss (CLE)	Earl Williams (ATL)
Cy Young Award	Ferguson Jenkins (CHC)	Vida Blue (OAK)
Most Valuable Player	Joe Torre (STL)	Vida Blue (OAK)
Gold Glove Awards
Position	National League	American League
Pitcher	Bob Gibson (STL)	Jim Kaat (MIN)
Catcher	Johnny Bench (CIN)	Ray Fosse (CLE)
1st Base	Wes Parker (LAD)	George Scott (BOS)
2nd Base	Tommy Helms (CIN)	Davey Johnson (BAL)
3rd Base	Doug Rader (HOU)	Brooks Robinson (BAL)
Shortstop	Bud Harrelson (NYM)	Mark Belanger (BAL)
Outfield	Bobby Bonds (SF)	Paul Blair (BAL)
Outfield	Roberto Clemente (PIT)	Amos Otis (KC)
Outfield	Willie Davis (LAD)	Carl Yastrzemski (BOS)

== Statistical leaders ==
	American League		National League	
Stat	Player	Total	Player	Total
AVG	Tony Oliva (MIN)	.337	Joe Torre (STL)	.363
HR	Bill Melton (CWS)	33	Willie Stargell (PIT)	48
RBI	Harmon Killebrew (MIN)	119	Joe Torre (STL)	137
W	Mickey Lolich (DET)	25	Ferguson Jenkins (CHC)	24
ERA	Vida Blue (OAK)	1.82	Tom Seaver (NYM)	1.76
K	Mickey Lolich (DET)	308	Tom Seaver (NYM)	289

== Major league baseball final standings ==
=== American League final standings ===
AL East
Team	W	L	Pct.	GB	Home	Road
^{(1)} Baltimore Orioles	101	57	.639	—	53‍–‍24	48‍–‍33
Detroit Tigers	91	71	.562	12	54‍–‍27	37‍–‍44
Boston Red Sox	85	77	.525	18	47‍–‍33	38‍–‍44
New York Yankees	82	80	.506	21	44‍–‍37	38‍–‍43
Washington Senators	63	96	.396	38½	35‍–‍46	28‍–‍50
Cleveland Indians	60	102	.370	43	29‍–‍52	31‍–‍50

AL West
Team	W	L	Pct.	GB	Home	Road
^{(2)} Oakland Athletics	101	60	.627	—	46‍–‍35	55‍–‍25
Kansas City Royals	85	76	.528	16	44‍–‍37	41‍–‍39
Chicago White Sox	79	83	.488	22½	39‍–‍42	40‍–‍41
California Angels	76	86	.469	25½	35‍–‍46	41‍–‍40
Minnesota Twins	74	86	.463	26½	37‍–‍42	37‍–‍44
Milwaukee Brewers	69	92	.429	32	34‍–‍48	35‍–‍44

Locations of teams for the 1970–1971 American League seasons
West East

=== National League final standings ===
NL East
Team	W	L	Pct.	GB	Home	Road
^{(1)} Pittsburgh Pirates	97	65	.599	—	52‍–‍28	45‍–‍37
St. Louis Cardinals	90	72	.556	7	45‍–‍36	45‍–‍36
Chicago Cubs	83	79	.512	14	44‍–‍37	39‍–‍42
New York Mets	83	79	.512	14	44‍–‍37	39‍–‍42
Montreal Expos	71	90	.441	25½	36‍–‍44	35‍–‍46
Philadelphia Phillies	67	95	.414	30	34‍–‍47	33‍–‍48

NL West
Team	W	L	Pct.	GB	Home	Road
^{(2)} San Francisco Giants	90	72	.556	—	51‍–‍30	39‍–‍42
Los Angeles Dodgers	89	73	.549	1	42‍–‍39	47‍–‍34
Atlanta Braves	82	80	.506	8	43‍–‍39	39‍–‍41
Cincinnati Reds	79	83	.488	11	46‍–‍35	33‍–‍48
Houston Astros	79	83	.488	11	39‍–‍42	40‍–‍41
San Diego Padres	61	100	.379	28½	33‍–‍48	28‍–‍52

Locations of teams for the 1971–1976 National League seasons
West East

== Nippon Professional Baseball final standings ==
=== Central League final standings ===
Central League
Team	G	W	L	T	Pct.	GB
Yomiuri Giants	130	70	52	8	.574	—
Chunichi Dragons	130	65	60	5	.520	6.5
Taiyo Whales	130	61	59	10	.508	8.0
Hiroshima Toyo Carp	130	63	61	6	.508	8.0
Hanshin Tigers	130	57	64	9	.471	12.5
Yakult Atoms	130	52	72	6	.419	19.0

=== Pacific League final standings ===
Pacific League
Team	G	W	L	T	Pct.	GB
Hankyu Braves	130	80	39	11	.672	—
Lotte Orions	130	80	46	4	.635	3.5
Osaka Kintetsu Buffaloes	130	65	60	5	.520	18.0
Nankai Hawks	130	61	65	4	.484	22.5
Toei Flyers	130	44	74	12	.373	35.5
Nishitetsu Lions	130	38	84	8	.311	43.5

== Events ==
=== January ===
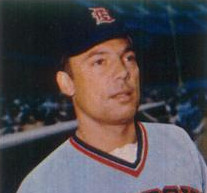
John Hiller

- January 7 – The ruptured Achilles tendon of Cincinnati Reds centerfielder Bobby Tolan brings an end to two sports seasons. Tolan suffers the injury while playing basketball for the Reds' offseason squad. He will miss the 1971 season because of the injury and the Cincinnati front office orders the basketball team to be disbanded.
- January 11 – Detroit Tigers pitcher John Hiller suffers a heart attack at age 27. He'll miss the 1971 season but will make a full recovery and remarkable comeback.
- January 18 – The Pittsburgh Pirates sign Tony Armas as a free agent.
- January 23 – The Milwaukee Brewers hire Frank "Trader" Lane as general manager, replacing Marvin Milkes. Eight days from his 76th birthday, Lane is the former GM of four MLB teams between 1948 and 1961, and is known for his relentless roster-churning and player transactions. By the time he retires after the 1972 season, Lane will have made more than 400 deals during his MLB career.
- January 29 – Making a trade within their division, the St. Louis Cardinals acquire well-traveled southpaw George Brunet and former NL batting champ Matty Alou from the Pittsburgh Pirates in exchange for right-hander Nelson Briles and outfielder Vic Davalillo.
- January 31 – The new Special Veterans Committee selects seven men for enshrinement to the Hall of Fame: former players Dave Bancroft, Jake Beckley, Chick Hafey, Harry Hooper, Joe Kelley and Rube Marquard, and executive George Weiss.

=== February ===
- February 9 – Former Negro leagues pitcher Satchel Paige is nominated for the Hall of Fame. On June 10, the Hall's new Veterans Committee will formally select Paige for induction.
- February 10 – The Los Angeles Dodgers acquire left-handed pitcher Al Downing from the Milwaukee Brewers in exchange for outfielder Andy Kosco. In 1974, Downing will become part of history as the pitcher who surrenders Hank Aaron's 715th career home run, which breaks the all-time record set by Babe Ruth.

=== March ===
- March 6 – Oakland Athletics owner Charles O. Finley persuades American League president Joe Cronin to experiment with a Cactus League exhibition game in which a base on balls is granted on three balls rather than four. The game sees pitchers issue 19 walks, batters slug six home runs, and the Athletics outscore the Milwaukee Brewers, 13–9.
- March 20 – Alex Johnson's season-long troubles with California Angels' management begin when manager Lefty Phillips removes the reigning American League batting champion from an exhibition game for failure to run out a ground ball and lackadaisical play on defense. The following day, Johnson also is pulled from a game for not running out a grounder.

=== April ===
- April 5:
  - The 1971 American League season begins with a non-traditional "Presidential Opener" at Robert F. Kennedy Stadium when Richard Nixon, a devoted baseball fan, misses the contest while on a working trip to California. It also will be the last such opener for the Washington Senators, who will move to Dallas–Fort Worth after the season ends. In the game, Washington's Dick Bosman throws a six-hit, complete game shutout and the Senators blank the Oakland Athletics, 8–0, before 45,061 fans.
  - In Cincinnati, 51,702 attend the first-ever National League opener played at Riverfront Stadium. The Atlanta Braves spoil the day for the defending NL champion Cincinnati Reds, 7–4, as Félix Millán goes four-for-four.
  - The St. Louis Cardinals return 21-year-old first baseman Cecil Cooper to the Boston Red Sox. The Cardinals had selected Cooper in the Rule 5 draft in November 1970.
- April 10:
  - The Philadelphia Phillies defeat the Montreal Expos, 4–1, in the first game played at Philadelphia's Veterans Stadium.
  - Willie Stargell of the Pittsburgh Pirates hits three home runs, including his 200th career homer.
  - Willie Mays of the San Francisco Giants becomes the first player to hit a home run in each of his team's first four games of a season. His fourth blast comes off Jerry Reuss in the third inning of a 6–4 victory over the St. Louis Cardinals at Busch Memorial Stadium. Earlier, Mays had hit homers in the season's first three games against the San Diego Padres.
- April 13 – An unusual arrangement sees two Double-A circuits, the Southern League and Texas League, temporarily merge into one loop, called the Dixie Association, for the 1971 season. The union is necessary because each league begins the year with only seven teams. After the Charlotte Hornets, a Minnesota Twins affiliate, win the 1971 championship in September, the constituent leagues each gain an eighth team, rebalancing their schedules, and they resume their separate identities in 1972.
- April 16 – The Atlanta Braves sign free agent pitcher Luis Tiant, released by the Minnesota Twins. Tiant, 30, is battling a sore arm.
- April 26 – Out of shape and his skills rusty after sitting out the entire 1970 season, Curt Flood notifies the Washington Senators that he is quitting baseball. Flood, who collected seven singles in 35 at bats in 13 games with Washington, moves temporarily to Spain, but continues his legal challenge to the reserve clause.
- April 27 – Hank Aaron becomes the third player in Major League history to hit his 600th home run.

=== May ===
- May 6 – NBC Sports and Major League Baseball agree to a four-year, $72 million contract, running through 1976, for 26 Saturday "Game of the Week" telecasts, ten Monday night games, the Major League Baseball All-Star Game, both the AL and NL League Championship Series, and the World Series. Part of the agreement stipulates that all World Series games played during the workweek be played at night.
- May 15:
  - Billy Williams of the Chicago Cubs hits the 300th home run of his career during a 6–4 win over the San Diego Padres at Wrigley Field. The milestone homer comes off Tom Phoebus.
  - Alex Johnson, voted the California Angels' Player of the Month for April, is held out of the lineup for failure to hustle during the previous day's game against Milwaukee at Anaheim Stadium. He will be benched four more times for similar reasons over the next six weeks.
  - Pitcher Luis Tiant, struggling to regain his form at Triple-A Richmond, is released by the Atlanta Braves just one month after signing with them. Two days later, free-agent Tiant signs with the Boston Red Sox and is assigned to their Triple-A club, the Louisville Colonels, where he continues his comeback efforts.
- May 17:
  - The Cincinnati Reds' 23-year-old superstar, Johnny Bench, hits his 100th career home run.
  - The Cleveland Indians are involved in a bizarre play against the Washington Senators at Robert F. Kennedy Memorial Stadium. The Senators' Tommy McCraw leads off the bottom of the fourth inning with a 140-foot pop fly (some sources say it was 250 feet) into short left-center for what should be an out. Instead, Indians shortstop Jack Heidemann, left fielder John Lowenstein and center fielder Vada Pinson collide as they go for the ball, which falls amongst the three players. Before the ball can be recovered, McCraw circles the bases for an inside-the-park home run; meanwhile, Heidemann, Lowenstein and Pinson are all injured and have to be replaced. Despite their embarrassing moment, the Indians defeat the Senators 6–3.
- May 29 – The Cincinnati Reds acquire 22-year-old outfielder George Foster from the San Francisco Giants for pitcher Vern Geishert and shortstop Frank Duffy. A powerful, right-handed hitter, Foster has been unable to crack the Giants' lineup. But given an opportunity to play by Cincinnati, he becomes the Reds' regular left-fielder (1975), leads the National League in runs batted in three consecutive years (1976–1978), smashes 52 homers to lead MLB and become his league's Most Valuable Player (1977), makes five NL All-Star teams, and wins two World Series rings (1975, 1976).
- May 30 – Willie Mays hits his 638th career home run and becomes the National League's all-time career leader in runs scored with 1,950. His San Francisco Giants, meanwhile, improve to 36–14 (.720) with a 5–4 win over the Montreal Expos at Candlestick Park. They lead the NL West by 10½ games over their bitter rivals, the Los Angeles Dodgers.

=== June ===
- June 2 – The Atlanta Braves release third baseman Clete Boyer. The 34-year-old former Gold Glove Award-winner has been publicly feuding with Braves' management for three weeks. Boyer plays four more seasons with the Taiyo Whales of Nippon Professional Baseball.
- June 3 – Pitcher Ken Holtzman of the Chicago Cubs throws the second no-hitter of his career, victimizing the host Cincinnati Reds, 1–0. Holtzman scores the only run, unearned, in the third inning, to beat Reds pitcher Gary Nolan.
- June 6 – Willie Mays hits his major league-leading 22nd and last career extra-inning home run. It comes against Phillies reliever Joe Hoerner.
- June 8 – The June 1971 amateur draft features future notable players who are selected in the early rounds. In the first, Burt Hooton goes to the Chicago Cubs, Jim Rice goes to the Boston Red Sox, and Frank Tanana goes to the California Angels. In the second round, George Brett is selected by the Kansas City Royals and Mike Schmidt goes to the Philadelphia Phillies.
- June 14 – The California Angels are engulfed in controversy when Alex Johnson charges that teammate Hiraldo "Chico" Ruiz pulled a gun on him in the Angels' clubhouse the previous day. There are no witnesses to the incident, which will be confirmed by Angels' general manager Dick Walsh in September. Johnson and Ruiz, formerly friends, have become bitter enemies.
- June 21 – Struggling at the plate (.199 with only 32 hits in 52 games played), Cleveland Indians first baseman Ken Harrelson, 29, announces his retirement from baseball and his intention to qualify for the professional golf tour. However, he will return to baseball as a colorful analyst and play-by-play announcer in 1975, and forge a 40-year broadcasting career that culminates with a Ford C. Frick Award.
- June 23 – In a singular performance, pitcher Rick Wise of the Philadelphia Phillies no-hits the Cincinnati Reds, 4–0, and bangs two home runs in the game. Wise joins Wes Ferrell (1931), Jim Tobin (1944) and Earl Wilson (1962) as the only pitchers to pitch a no-hitter and hit a home run in the same game. It is the second no-hitter against Cincinnati this month, both in Riverfront Stadium.

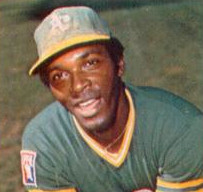
Vida Blue

- June 25:
  - Vida Blue, the electrifying 22-year-old Oakland Athletics left-hander, wins his 16th game of 1971 (against two losses), firing a five-hit, 7–0 shutout against the visiting Kansas City Royals while fanning 12 hitters; the blanking lowers his earned run average to 1.37. In Oakland's 70th game of 1971, Blue records his 16th complete game, sixth shutout, and the sixth time he has reached double-digits in strikeouts.
  - Willie Stargell of the Pittsburgh Pirates hits what will be the longest home run ever hit at Veterans Stadium. In the second inning of the Pirates' 14–4 victory over the Philadelphia Phillies, his shot off Jim Bunning strikes above an exit in the 600 level of the upper deck. The spot where the ball struck will eventually be marked with a yellow star with a black "S" inside a white circle until Stargell's 2001 death, after which the white circle will then be painted black. The star will remain until the stadium's 2004 demolition.
- June 26 – California Angels general manager Dick Walsh suspends outfielder Alex Johnson for "failure to give his best efforts" during games. The Major League Baseball Players Association files a grievance on Johnson's behalf four days later. Johnson never plays for the Angels again.
- June 29 – The Atlanta Braves release 48-year-old knuckleball artist Hoyt Wilhelm. He signs as a free agent with the Los Angeles Dodgers on July 10, 1971, and finishes his Hall of Fame career in a Dodger uniform exactly one year later after 1,070 games pitched over 21 seasons.
- June 30 – American League owners meet behind closed doors for over eight hours in Detroit to discuss the fate of the Washington Senators franchise, after it's revealed that owner Bob Short has not paid rent for Robert F. Kennedy Stadium since the end of the 1969 season. During the meeting, Short begins to campaign for support to move the ten-year-old expansion team to Dallas–Fort Worth for the 1972 season.

=== July ===
- July 7 – Commissioner of Baseball Bowie Kuhn announces that players from the Negro leagues elected to the Hall of Fame will be given full membership in the museum. It had been previously announced that they would be honored in a separate wing.
- July 9:
  - The Oakland Athletics beat the California Angels 1–0 in 20 innings—the longest shutout in American League history. Vida Blue strikes out 17 batters in 11 innings for Oakland, while the Angels' Billy Cowan ties a major league record by fanning six times. Both teams combine for 43 strikeouts, a new major league record.
  - Kansas City Royals shortstop Freddie Patek hits for the cycle in the Royals' 6–3 victory over the Minnesota Twins at Metropolitan Stadium.
- July 10 – In the wake of his team's marathon loss the day before, California Angels outfielder Tony Conigliaro announces his retirement at age 26, asserting that his vision, initially compromised when he was struck in the face by a pitch on August 18, 1967, is deteriorating and he cannot see well enough to play. A medical examination later confirms Conigliaro's statement. Batting only .222 with four homers in 74 games in 1971, Conigliaro will sit out three full seasons before attempting a final comeback in 1975 with his original team, the Boston Red Sox.
- July 13 – In an All-Star Game featuring home runs by future Hall of Famers Hank Aaron, Johnny Bench, Roberto Clemente, Reggie Jackson, Harmon Killebrew and Frank Robinson, the American League triumphs over the National League 6–4 at Tiger Stadium. It is the only AL All-Star victory between 1962 and 1983. Jackson's home run goes 520 feet, and Robinson is named MVP.
- July 30 – The Cleveland Indians fire general manager/field manager Alvin Dark. Club president Gabe Paul resumes his former role as GM, and coach Johnny Lipon takes over as interim pilot through season's end. The Tribe are 43–61, sixth and last in the American League East, and have recently been fined for including illegal performance incentives in player contracts.

=== August ===
- August 4:
  - In Texas League action, Tom Walker pitched a 15-inning no-hitter for the Dallas-Fort Worth Spurs to beat the Albuquerque Dodgers, 1–0, which is considered the second longest no-hitter pitched in American professional baseball history. Walker struck out 11 batters and walked four to complete the gem. His manager, Cal Ripken Sr., left him in the game until he finally picked the victory after throwing 176 pitches. Only Fred Toney, who hurled 17 no-hit innings in the Blue Grass League in 1909, has pitched a longer no-hitter in baseball history.
  - St. Louis Cardinals pitcher Bob Gibson wins his 200th game, a 7–2 victory over the San Francisco Giants at St. Louis.
- August 7 – Ken Boswell belts his first career grand slam home run and a run-scoring double as the New York Mets explode for 21 hits and crush the Atlanta Braves, 20–6. The 20 runs are a Mets record, breaking the mark of 19 set against the Chicago Cubs on May 6, 1964.
- August 10:
  - Harmon Killebrew becomes the 10th player to amass 500 home runs, and adds his 501st, but the Orioles beat the Twins 4–3. Mike Cuellar picks up the win.
  - Sixteen baseball researchers at Cooperstown form the Society for American Baseball Research (SABR), with founder Robert Davids as president.
- August 14 – Ten days after his 200th victory, St. Louis Cardinal pitcher Bob Gibson no-hits the Pittsburgh Pirates 11–0, the first no-hitter ever pitched at Three Rivers Stadium. He strikes out 10 batters along the way; three of those Ks belong to Willie Stargell, including the final out. The no-hitter is the first to be pitched in Pittsburgh in 64 years; none had been pitched in the 62-year (mid-1909 to mid-1970) history of Three Rivers Stadium's predecessor, Forbes Field.
- August 17 – Billy Williams collects the 2,000th hit of his career in a 5–4 loss to the Atlanta Braves in Atlanta.
- August 23 – A clubhouse meeting called by Chicago Cubs pilot Leo Durocher after a frustrating, 4–3 loss the day before to the Houston Astros backfires when several players, including Joe Pepitone and Ron Santo, respond by criticizing Durocher's managing. When news of the rift hits the sports pages, owner Philip K. Wrigley takes out a full-page newspaper ad on September 3 backing his skipper and blasting the "Dump Durocher clique." On the field, the Cubs lose 15 of their next 21 games after the clubhouse ruckus.
- August 24 – The City Council of Washington, D.C. files suit against the Senators and owner Bob Short, seeking collection of $136,848 in unpaid rent for Robert F. Kennedy Stadium that dates to the end of the 1969 season. Commissioner of Baseball Bowie Kuhn then spends the following two weeks looking for potential buyers who will keep the team in the U.S. capital.
- August 25 - The Cincinnati Reds signed free agent infielder Doug Flynn.
- August 28 – Phillies pitcher Rick Wise hits two home runs, including a grand slam off Don McMahon, in the second game of a doubleheader, duplicating his feat in his June no-hitter. Wise beats the San Francisco Giants, 7–3.

=== September ===
- September 1 – The Pittsburgh Pirates start what is believed to be the first All-Black lineup in major league history, which include several Latin American players, in a 10–7 victory over the Philadelphia Phillies. The lineup: Rennie Stennett (2B); Gene Clines (CF); Roberto Clemente (RF); Willie Stargell (LF); Manny Sanguillén (C); Dave Cash (3B); Al Oliver (1B); Jackie Hernández (SS), and Dock Ellis (P). Another Black player, Bob Veale, was one of three relievers in the game.
- September 3 – Ron Cey makes his MLB debut, pinch hitting for pitcher Jose Pena in the Dodgers 6–5 win over the Cincinnati Reds. Cey would go on to be the Dodgers regular starting third baseman for the next 12 seasons.
- September 5 – J. R. Richard ties Karl Spooner's major league record by striking out 15 San Francisco Giants in his first major league game, as the Houston Astros beat the Giants.
- September 9 – The Chicago Cubs sign Bruce Sutter as an amateur free agent.
- September 10 – Ferguson Jenkins breaks Charlie Root's Chicago Cubs club record for career strikeouts during an 8–7, 12-inning loss to the Cardinals at Wrigley Field.
- September 13 – Baltimore Orioles right fielder Frank Robinson becomes the 11th player to reach 500 career home runs.
- September 15:
  - Sal Bando's two-run, eighth-inning homer in the first game of a doubleheader at Comiskey Park lifts the Oakland Athletics to a 3–2 victory over the Chicago White Sox. When the second-place Kansas City Royals fall to the California Angels, the Athletics (94–54) lock up the American League West Division championship. It's the franchise's first trip to the postseason in 40 years—when it played in Philadelphia and was managed by legendary Connie Mack.
  - Pitcher Larry Yount, elder brother of Robin, the Baseball Hall of Fame shortstop/centerfielder, is called upon to make his MLB debut for the Houston Astros in relief in the ninth inning of a game against the Atlanta Braves. But Yount injures his arm in the bullpen, and once on the mound, the pain gets worse as he warms up. Astros manager Harry Walker pulls the injured hurler from the game before he throws a single pitch. Yount, then 21, never appears in another major-league game.
- September 21 – Meeting in Boston, American League owners approve the transfer of the Washington Senators to Dallas–Fort Worth, after an 11th-hour bid from a local ownership group falls apart. The vote is 10–2, with only Baltimore and Chicago opposed. The move will end the AL's presence in Washington, D.C. after 71 consecutive years (and two different "Senators" franchises). It's the ninth franchise shift in MLB since March 1953, and will be the last such transfer until 2005, when Washington joins the National League as the new home of the former Montreal Expos.
- September 22 – At Busch Stadium, the Pittsburgh Pirates clinch the National League East title for the second straight year as they beat the Bob Gibson-led St. Louis Cardinals, 5–1.

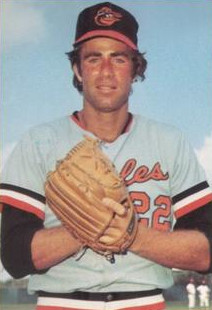
Jim Palmer

- September 24 – At Cleveland Stadium, the Baltimore Orioles clinch the American League East title for the third straight year by beating the Indians, 7–2 in the first game of a doubleheader. Mike Cuellar picks up his 20th victory of 1971.
- September 26 – Baltimore Orioles pitcher Jim Palmer shuts out the host Cleveland Indians, 5–0, and becomes the fourth member of the Orioles 1971 pitching staff to notch his 20th victory, joining Dave McNally, Mike Cuellar and Pat Dobson. Only one other team in ML history, the 1920 Chicago White Sox, boasted four 20-game winners.
- September 28:
  - An independent arbitrator rules that the California Angels must pay suspended outfielder Alex Johnson $29,970 in back salary, because Johnson should have been placed on the disabled list for "emotional incapacitation" rather than suspended without pay. The Angels are permitted to keep the $3,750 in the 29 fines the team levied against Johnson before his June 26 suspension.
  - Philadelphia Phillies pitcher Jim Bunning, 39, announces his retirement as an active player after 224 victories, nine All-Star selections, and a perfect game; he will be elected to the Baseball Hall of Fame in 1996. Bunning will manage in the Phillies' farm system for four seasons before beginning a successful career in politics.
- September 29 – The Montreal Expos' Ron Hunt is hit by a pitch for the 50th time of the season.
- September 30 – In the last American League home game ever played in Washington, D.C., the Senators lead 7–5 but forfeit the contest to the New York Yankees, when, with two outs in the top of the ninth, fans storm the field. The Senators will relocate to Arlington, Texas, and became the Texas Rangers for the 1972 season.

=== October ===
- October 5:
  - The Baltimore Orioles win their ninth consecutive American League Championship Series game, defeating the Oakland Athletics, 5–3, to reach their third straight World Series. Baltimore is undefeated (9–0) in ALCS play, having swept Minnesota in both 1969 and 1970, and Oakland this season.
  - The California Angels trade outfielder Alex Johnson, suspended since June 26, and catcher Jerry Moses to the Cleveland Indians for pitcher Alan Foster and outfielders Vada Pinson and Frank Baker. The following day, the Angels fire manager Lefty Phillips.
- October 6 – The Pittsburgh Pirates break a 5–5 deadlock with four sixth-inning runs to defeat the San Francisco Giants and win the 1971 National League Championship Series, three games to one. A three-run homer by Al Oliver seals the Pittsburgh win. It's the first LCS in either circuit that does not end in a three-game sweep.
- October 10 – With Game 2 of the 1971 World Series postponed by rain, the Boston Red Sox and Milwaukee Brewers pull off a nine-player blockbuster. The Red Sox trade pitchers Ken Brett and Jim Lonborg (1967's American League Cy Young Award winner), first baseman George Scott, and outfielders Billy Conigliaro and Joe Lahoud to the Brewers for pitchers Lew Krausse Jr. and Marty Pattin and outfielders Tommy Harper and Pat Skrable.
- October 17 – Pitcher Steve Blass throws a four-hitter and Roberto Clemente homers as the Pittsburgh Pirates win Game 7 of the World Series over the Baltimore Orioles, 2–1, becoming world champions for the first time since 1960. Clemente is named the Series MVP. Game 4, played on October 13, is the first night game in World Series history.
- October 18 – In an eight-player trade, the New York Mets send pitchers Jim Bibby, Rich Folkers and Charlie Hudson and outfielder Art Shamsky to the St. Louis Cardinals for pitchers Harry Parker and Chuck Taylor, first baseman/outfielder Jim Beauchamp and shortstop Chip Coulter.
- October 20 – The fallout from the California Angels' disastrous 1971 season continues when the club fires general manager Dick Walsh, who has four years remaining on a seven-year contract.
- October 27 – Baltimore Orioles general manager Harry Dalton is hired to fill Walsh's old job as GM of the California Angels. In his six years as head of baseball operations, Dalton's Orioles have won four American League pennants and two World Series titles. Executive vice president Frank Cashen assumes the Orioles' GM duties.

=== November ===
- November 2 – Pat Dobson of the Baltimore Orioles pitches a no-hitter against the Yomiuri Giants, winning 2–0. It is the first no-hitter in Japanese-American baseball exhibition history. The Orioles compile a record of 12–2–4 on the tour.
- November 9 – The Cleveland Indians, who finished last in the AL East and lost 102 games in 1971, promote former infielder Ken Aspromonte to manager. Aspromonte, 40, spent the past two seasons at the helm of Triple-A Wichita.
- November 10:
  - Joe Torre of the St. Louis Cardinals, who led the National League in batting average (.363) and runs batted in (137) while hitting 24 home runs, is named the Most Valuable Player over Willie Stargell of the Pittsburgh Pirates (.295/125/48). Torre receives 318 points to 222 for Stargell.
  - Oakland Athletics pitcher Vida Blue adds the American League MVP Award to his list of awards for 1971, easily outpointing teammate Sal Bando 268–182.
- November 14 – In Venezuelan Winter League, Luis Tiant of the Tiburones de la Guaira hurls a 3–0 no-hitter against his former team Leones del Caracas. Tiant becomes the fourth pitcher in the league's 26-year history to achieve the feat, joining Len Yochim (1955), Mel Nelson (1963) and Howie Reed (1968).
- November 17 – At age 22, Oakland Athletics pitcher Vida Blue becomes the youngest player ever to win the Most Valuable Player Award and only the fourth to capture both the Cy Young Award and the MVP in the same season.
- November 22 – Cleveland Indians first baseman Chris Chambliss receives 11 of 24 first place votes to win the American League Rookie of the Year Award.
- November 23 – Just weeks after winning his second World Series championship, Pittsburgh Pirates manager Danny Murtaugh announces his retirement. The 53-year-old Murtaugh has a history of health issues and was briefly hospitalized during 1971 for chest pain; his decision ends the third of four terms he will serve as the team's manager. The Pirates name coach and former centerfielder Bill Virdon as Murtaugh's successor.
- November 24 – Catcher-infielder Earl Williams, who hit 33 home runs and 87 RBI for the Atlanta Braves, wins the National League Rookie of the Year honors. Williams gets 18 of 24 first place votes, with the others going to Willie Montañez of the Philadelphia Phillies.

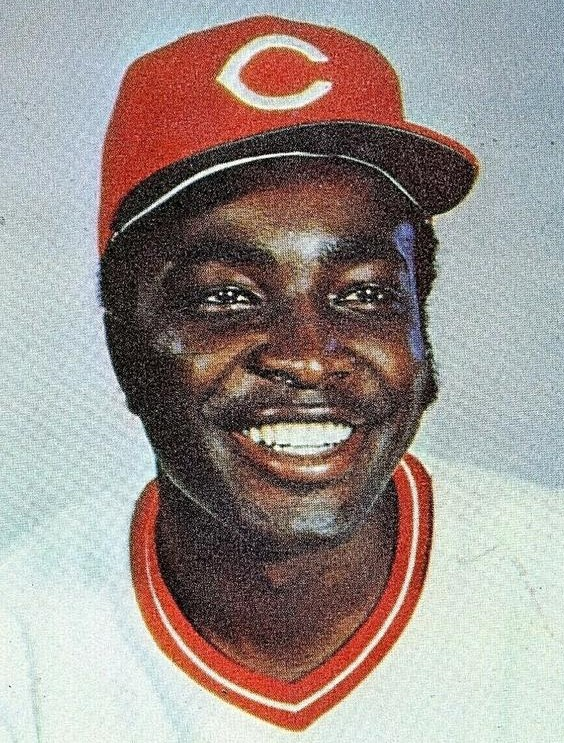
Joe Morgan

- November 29:
  - The Cincinnati Reds send first baseman Lee May, second baseman Tommy Helms and utilityman Jimmy Stewart to the Houston Astros for second baseman Joe Morgan, outfielder César Gerónimo and pitcher Jack Billingham. This trade, initially criticized in the Cincinnati press, will prove to be one of the best in Reds' history, and "puts the wheels" on the Big Red Machine when future Hall-of-Famer Morgan wins the 1975 and 1976 NL MVP awards.
  - The Chicago Cubs trade pitcher Ken Holtzman to the Oakland Athletics for outfielder Rick Monday. Southpaw Holtzman will go 4–1 (2.55 ERA) in eight World Series games and help Oakland win championships in 1972, 1973 and 1974.
  - The San Francisco Giants deal future Hall-of-Fame pitcher Gaylord Perry and shortstop Frank Duffy to the Cleveland Indians for fireballing southpaw Sam McDowell.
- November 30 – The Chicago White Sox purchase the contract of Jorge Orta from Mexicali of the Mexican Northern League.

=== December ===
- December 1 – The Chicago Cubs release longtime star and future Hall of Famer Ernie Banks, ending his 19-year major league career. The Cubs also announce that Banks will serve as a coach on manager Leo Durocher's staff in 1972. "Mr. Cub" finishes his illustrious playing career with 512 home runs and 1,636 RBI.
- December 2 – Eight trades are announced today during the 1971 Winter Meetings, including:
  - The Los Angeles Dodgers deal pitchers Doyle Alexander and Bob O'Brien, catcher Sergio Robles and outfielder Royle Stillman to the Baltimore Orioles for former Dodger hurler Pete Richert and future Baseball Hall of Fame outfielder Frank Robinson. Robinson's six years in Baltimore have produced four American League pennants and two World Series titles.
  - The Dodgers then trade slugging third baseman/outfielder Dick Allen to the Chicago White Sox for starting pitcher Tommy John and infielder Steve Huntz. Allen will win the 1972 American League Most Valuable Player Award; John will go 87–42 (2.97 ERA) in six seasons with the Dodgers.
  - The White Sox obtain starting pitcher Stan Bahnsen from the New York Yankees for infielder Rich McKinney.
  - The Kansas City Royals acquire young first baseman John Mayberry from the Houston Astros for pitchers Lance Clemons and Jim York. Mayberry, 22, will slam 143 homers and make two AL All-Star teams in his six seasons with the Royals.
  - The newly transferred and renamed Texas Rangers make three deals involving 13 players.
- December 3:
  - The Milwaukee Brewers trade outfielder José Cardenal to the Chicago Cubs for pitchers Jim Colborn and Earl Stephenson and outfielder Brock Davis. Colborn will win 20 games for the 1973 Brewers.
  - The San Diego Padres deal left-hander Dave Roberts, who finished second in the National League in earned run average (2.10) in 1971, to the Houston Astros for pitchers Bill Greif and Mark Schaeffer and infielder Derrel Thomas.
  - The Cincinnati Reds send former NL saves leader Wayne Granger to the Minnesota Twins for left-hander Tom "The Blade" Hall.
- December 6 – When news leaks out that local investors led by Cleveland shipping magnate George M. Steinbrenner III have reached a handshake deal to buy the Indians for $8.5 million, enraged owner Vernon Stouffer pulls out of the transaction. Stouffer believes that the reported sale price is an attempt to force him to sell the cellar-dwelling team for at least $1.5 million below his target asking price of $10-million-plus. Fourteen months later, Steinbrenner's group successfully bids for the New York Yankees, buying them from CBS in a deal worth only $8.8 million.
- December 8 – The California Angels fill their managerial vacancy with Del Rice, former MLB catcher and coach, who has been managing the club's Triple-A Salt Lake City affiliate.
- December 10 – The Angels acquire future Hall-of-Famer Nolan Ryan from the New York Mets, along with pitcher Don Rose, catcher Francisco Estrada and outfielder Leroy Stanton, in exchange for six-time All-Star shortstop Jim Fregosi. Fireballer Ryan will throw four of his record seven career no-hitters and record five seasons of 300 or more strikeouts over his eight seasons in an Angel uniform.
- December 13 – The Philadelphia Phillies acquire outfielder Bill Robinson, 28, from the Chicago White Sox organization for a minor-league catcher. After a disappointing stint with the 1967–1969 New York Yankees, Robinson has not played in the majors since September 25, 1969. But he will successfully revive his career over the next 12 seasons as a member of the Phillies and Pittsburgh Pirates.

== Births ==
=== January ===
- January 2 – Rick Greene
- January 4 – Chris Michalak
- January 5 – Jason Bates
- January 6 – Eric Moody
- January 7
  - Frank Menechino
  - Jorge Toca
- January 8 – Jason Giambi
- January 11
  - Alex Delgado
  - Rey Ordóñez
- January 12 – Andy Fox
- January 13 – Elmer Dessens
- January 17 – Tyler Houston
- January 19
  - Jeff Juden
  - Phil Nevin
- January 20 – Brian Giles
- January 21 – Johnny Guzmán
- January 23 – Charlie Greene
- January 24 – Cory Bailey
- January 25 – Kerry Taylor
- January 27 – Ken Huckaby
- January 28 – Kevin Tolar

=== February ===
- February 3
  - Scott Klingenbeck
  - Eric Owens
- February 4 – Dennis Konuszewski
- February 8 – James Hoye
- February 10 – Kevin Sefcik
- February 13 – Todd Williams
- February 15 – Terry Jones
- February 16 – Mike Hubbard
- February 17 – Danny Patterson
- February 19 – Miguel Batista
- February 21 – Jeff Schmidt
- February 26
  - Matt Luke
  - Danny Perez

=== March ===
- March 3 – José Oliva
- March 4 – Nerio Rodríguez
- March 5
  - Chad Fonville
  - Jeffrey Hammonds
  - Brian Hunter
  - Brian Lesher
  - José Mercedes
- March 6 – Roger Salkeld
- March 10
  - Bobby Hughes
  - Shad Williams
- March 11
  - Rod Henderson
  - Lee Sang-hoon
- March 12
  - Greg Hansell
  - Raúl Mondesí
- March 13 – Scott Sullivan
- March 17 – Bill Mueller
- March 19 – D. T. Cromer
- March 20 – Manny Alexander
- March 26
  - Frank Lankford
  - Jesús Tavárez
- March 29 – Sean Lowe

=== April ===
- April 1 – José Martínez
- April 3 – Quilvio Veras
- April 5 – Andrés Berumen
- April 6 – Lou Merloni
- April 7 – Mark Thompson
- April 12 – Matt Williams
- April 13 – Kevin Ohme
- April 14
  - Carlos Pérez
  - Gregg Zaun
- April 16 – Marc Sagmoen
- April 17 – Keith Johnson
- April 19 – Sean Whiteside
- April 25 – Brad Clontz
- April 29 – Sterling Hitchcock
- April 30 – Ryan Hawblitzel

=== May ===
- May 2 – Brent Bowers
- May 4
  - Joe Borowski
  - Brian Maxcy
- May 5 – Mike Redmond
- May 8 – Todd Greene
- May 10 – Glen Barker
- May 11 – Kerry Ligtenberg
- May 13 – Mike Sirotka
- May 14 – Takashi Kashiwada
- May 18 – Rich Garcés
- May 21 – Chris Widger
- May 22 – Steve Reich
- May 23 – Marshall Boze
- May 24 – Todd Rizzo
- May 25
  - Angel Echevarria
  - Sean Maloney
- May 26 – Jason Bere
- May 31 – José Malavé

=== June ===
- June 3
  - Carl Everett
  - Aaron Ledesma
  - Izzy Molina
- June 7 – Roberto Petagine
- June 8 – Matt Whisenant
- June 12 – Ryan Klesko
- June 13 – Jason Thompson
- June 16
  - Chris Gomez
  - Fernando Hernández
- June 22
  - Brant Brown
  - Brian Sackinsky
  - Hunter Wendelstedt
- June 25 – Michael Tucker
- June 26 – Greg Blosser
- June 28
  - Greg Keagle
  - Ron Mahay

=== July ===
- July 1 – Jamie Walker
- July 2 – Joel Adamson
- July 4 – Brendan Donnelly
- July 13 – Rich Aude
- July 15
  - James Baldwin
  - Tim Harikkala
- July 19
  - Gus Gandarillas
  - Keith Johns
- July 20
  - Charles Johnson
  - Ray McDavid
- July 25 – Billy Wagner
- July 27 – Shane Bowers
- July 29 – Johnny Ruffin
- July 30
  - Ron Blazier
  - Calvin Murray

=== August ===
- August 1 – Travis Driskill
- August 2 – Steve Sinclair
- August 3 – Chris Sexton
- August 5 – Carlos Pulido
- August 9
  - Scott Karl
  - Ryan Radmanovich
  - Ben Van Ryn
- August 10 – Sal Fasano
- August 14 – Mark Loretta
- August 17
  - Jim Converse
  - Jorge Posada
- August 18 – Albie López
- August 20 – Chris Clapinski
- August 21 – Lou Pote
- August 22 – Carl Schutz
- August 23 – Allen McDill
- August 24 – Everett Stull
- August 28 – Shane Andrews
- August 29
  - Henry Blanco
  - Bronson Heflin

=== September ===
- September 1 – Derek Wallace
- September 2 – Rich Aurilia
- September 5 – Brian Bevil
- September 7 – Sid Roberson
- September 9 – Robinson Checo
- September 13
  - Brent Brede
  - Armando Ríos
- September 15 – Jason Hardtke
- September 18 – Chris Holt
- September 19 – Joey Dawley
- September 23 – Willie Greene
- September 24
  - Jamie Burke
  - Kevin Millar
- September 28 – Jamie Brewington
- September 29 – Eddy Díaz

=== October ===
- October 3
  - Wil Cordero
  - Tim Hyers
- October 4 – Carlos Crawford
- October 8 – Joe Ayrault
- October 11 – Joe Roa
- October 12 – Tony Fiore
- October 14 – Midre Cummings
- October 15 – Chad Mottola
- October 16 – Larry Mitchell
- October 25 – Pedro Martínez
- October 27 – Scott Forster

=== November ===
- November 3 – Danny Young
- November 4 – Melvin Bunch
- November 6 – Bubba Trammell
- November 7 – Todd Ritchie
- November 9
  - Jon Nunnally
  - Scott Sauerbeck
- November 10
  - Butch Huskey
  - Terry Pearson
- November 11
  - Roland de la Maza
  - Ryan Hancock
- November 15
  - Ryan Jackson
  - Todd Steverson
- November 17 – Billy McMillon
- November 19 – Andy Sheets
- November 20
  - Kevin Lomon
  - Gabe White
- November 21 – John Roper
- November 23
  - Ryan McGuire
  - Matt Miller
  - Eddie Oropesa
  - Aaron Small
- November 25 – Tavo Álvarez
- November 27 – Iván Rodríguez
- November 28 – Bill Simas
- November 30
  - Ray Durham
  - Matt Lawton

=== December ===
- December 6
  - José Contreras
- Adam Hyzdu
- December 8 – Garvin Alston
- December 9 – Todd Van Poppel
- December 11 – Willie Cañate
- December 13 – Greg Mullins
- December 14 – Eric Ludwick
- December 15 – Héctor Ramírez
- December 16 – Jeff Granger
- December 17 – Bret Hemphill
- December 20 – Marc Valdes
- December 22 – Jon Ratliff
- December 24 – Alex Cabrera
- December 26
  - Jay Tessmer
  - Carlos Valdéz
- December 28
  - Benny Agbayani
- Melvin Nieves
- December 30 – Travis Baptist
- December 31
  - Esteban Loaiza
  - Brian Moehler

== Deaths ==
=== January ===
- January 1
  - Luis Aparicio Sr., 58, legendary Venezuelan shortstop and father of the Baseball Hall-of-Famer.
  - Joe Lotz, 79, pitcher who worked in 12 games for the 1916 St. Louis Cardinals.
  - Harry Rice, 69, outfielder noted for his defense who also hit .300 five times; played in 1,034 games between 1923 and 1933 for five clubs, principally the St. Louis Browns and Detroit Tigers.
- January 7
  - Dud Lee, 71, infielder for the St. Louis Browns and Boston Red Sox in the 1920s.
  - Hal Rhyne, 71, shortstop who played from 1926 to 1933 for the Pirates, Red Sox and White Sox.
- January 9 – Elmer Flick, 94, Hall of Fame right fielder and lifetime .313 hitter who led AL in triples three times, steals twice, and batting and runs once each.
- January 12 – Cy Malis, 63, pitcher who threw 32/3 innings of relief for the Philadelphia Phillies in his only MLB game, on August 17, 1934.
- January 22 – Dorothy Comiskey Rigney, 54, granddaughter of Charles Comiskey and principal owner of the Chicago White Sox from December 10, 1956, to February 7, 1959, when she sold her controlling interest to Bill Veeck.
- January 27 – Bruce Connatser, 68, first baseman for 1931–1932 Cleveland Indians; later a longtime scout.
- January 31 – Steve Yerkes, 82, second baseman who played in 711 games over seven seasons with the Boston Red Sox, Pittsburgh Rebels of the "outlaw" Federal League, and Chicago Cubs between 1909 and 1916; played all eight games of the 1912 World Series for champion Boston.
- January – Bob Clarke, 67 or 68, Negro leagues catcher whose career extended from 1923 to 1948; member, Negro National League 1940 All-Star team.

=== February ===
- February 8 – Bobby Burke, 64, left-handed pitcher who appeared in 254 MLB games in ten seasons between 1927 and 1937, mostly for the Washington Senators; threw a no-hitter against Boston on August 8, 1931.
- February 16 – Cedric Durst, 74, outfielder for the St. Louis Browns, New York Yankees and Boston Red Sox between 1922 and 1930; member of the 1927–1928 world–champion Yankees.
- February 18 – Chuck Hostetler, 67, outfielder who appeared in 132 games for the Detroit Tigers after his 40th birthday during the wartime 1944 and 1945 seasons; member of Detroit's 1945 World Series champions.
- February 20 – Vidal López, 52, three-time Triple Crown Pitching winner and slugging outfielder who played in the professional leagues of Cuba, México, Puerto Rico and Venezuela, throughout a career that lasted 21 years between the 1930s and 1950s.
- February 28 – Lou Chiozza, 60, infielder-outfielder who appeared in 616 games from 1934 to 1939 for the Philadelphia Phillies and New York Giants; first player to bat in the major leagues' first night game on May 24, 1935, at Cincinnati.

=== March ===
- March 2 – Johnny Podgajny, 50, pitcher in 115 games for the Philadelphia Phillies (1940–1943), Pittsburgh Pirates (1943) and Cleveland Indians (1946).
- March 8 – Tripp Sigman, 72, outfielder who appeared in 62 games for the 1929–1930 Phillies.
- March 10 – Bill James, 78, pitcher for the Boston Braves (1913–1915 and 1919); compiled a 26–7 won–lost record for the "Miracle Braves" of 1914 and won two games in the 1914 World Series, throwing 11 shutout innings, as Boston swept the Philadelphia Athletics.
- March 11
  - Clyde Barfoot, 79, pitcher for the St.Louis Cardinals (1922–1923) and Detroit Tigers (1926) who worked in 86 major league contests.
  - Pelayo Chacón, 82, Cuban shortstop and manager in the Negro leagues whose playing career extended from 1908 to 1930.
- March 16 – Ralph Birkofer, 62, left-handed pitcher who appeared in 132 games for the Pittsburgh Pirates and Brooklyn Dodgers from 1933 to 1937.
- March 18 – Tony Welzer, 71, pitcher for the Boston Red Sox from 1926 to 1927, who was the first player born in Germany to appear in an American League game.
- March 24 – Verlon Walker, 42, coach for the Chicago Cubs from 1961 until his death, and former minor-league catcher and manager; younger brother of Rube Walker.
- March 31 – Sam Post, 74, first baseman who appeared in nine games for the 1922 Brooklyn Robins.

=== April ===
- April 3 – Jack Boyle, 81, third baseman, shortstop and pinch hitter in 15 games for the 1912 Philadelphia Phillies.
- April 4 – Carl Mays, 79, underhand pitcher who won 20 games five times with three teams, but was best remembered for his pitch which struck Ray Chapman in the head for the only field fatality in major league history.
- April 9
  - Elmer Eggert, 69, pitcher for the 1927 Boston Red Sox.
  - Will Harridge, 87, president of the American League from 1931 to 1958.
- April 12 – Ed Lafitte, 85, pitcher who worked in 33 games for the Detroit Tigers between 1909 and 1912, followed by 73 appearances for the Brooklyn Tip-Tops of the "outlaw" Federal League in 1914 and 1915.
- April 15 – Mickey Harris, 54, All-Star pitcher who won 17 games for the 1946 Red Sox, led AL in saves with 1950 Senators.
- April 16
  - William Eckert, 62, Commissioner of Baseball from December 15, 1965, to February 3, 1969; retired United States Air Force general.
  - Ron Northey, 50, outfielder with a powerful arm for five MLB teams between 1942 and 1957; hit a record three pinch-hit grand slams in his career.
- April 19 – Russ Hodges, 60, broadcaster for the New York/San Francisco Giants from 1946 until his 1970 retirement; previously handled play-by-play for the Chicago Cubs and Chicago White Sox (1935–1938) and Washington Senators (1943–1945); also teamed with Mel Allen on New York Yankees' broadcasts from 1946 until the Bombers and Giants ended their joint radio/TV arrangement after the 1948 season; known for his legendary call of Bobby Thomson's pennant-winning home run during Game 3 of the 1951 National League tie-breaker series.
- April 26 – Joe Agler, 83, first baseman who played 232 games of his 234-game MLB career in the short-lived Federal League, with Buffalo (1914–1915) and Baltimore (1915).

=== May ===
- May 4 – Billy Mullen, 75, third baseman who appeared in 36 total games over five seasons for the St. Louis Browns (1920–1921 and 1928), Brooklyn Robins (1923) and Detroit Tigers (1926).
- May 10 – Eddie Edmonson, 81, first baseman/outfielder in two games for 1913 Cleveland Naps.
- May 12 – Heinie Manush, 69, Hall of Fame left fielder and career .330 hitter who won 1926 batting title with Detroit, led AL in hits and doubles twice each.
- May 15 – Goose Goslin, 70, Hall of Fame left fielder who starred for five pennant winners in Washington and Detroit, batting .316 lifetime with eleven 100-RBI seasons; one of the first ten players to hit 200 home runs, he retired with the 7th-most RBIs in history.
- May 20 – Martín Dihigo, 65, Cuban star in the Negro leagues who excelled at all positions, particularly as a pitcher and second baseman.
- May 24
  - Charlie Grover, 80, pitcher who worked in two games for the Detroit Tigers in September 1913.
  - Rupert "Tommy" Thompson, 61, outfielder who appeared in 397 games for the Boston Braves, Chicago White Sox and St. Louis Browns.
- May 26 – Judge Nagle, 91, pitched for the Pittsburgh Pirates and Boston Red Sox during the 1911 season.
- May 27 – Jack Doscher, 90, left-handed pitcher for Chicago, Brooklyn and Cincinnati of the National League (1903–1906, 1908).

=== June ===
- June 3 – Vern Spencer, 77, New York Giants outfielder who appeared in 45 games during the 1920 season.
- June 8 – Ed Rile, 70, first baseman and pitcher whose career in the Negro leagues spanned 1918 to 1936; batted .306 lifetime in 454 games in the Negro National League.
- June 19
  - Gene Bremer, 54, All-Star pitcher of the Negro leagues between 1937 and 1948 who principally played for the Cleveland Buckeyes and Memphis Red Sox.
  - Bert Graham, 85, first- and second-baseman (and pinch hitter) who got into eight games for the 1910 St. Louis Browns.
- June 24 – Tom "Shaky" Kain, 63, longtime minor league manager and scout, influential to early career of Yogi Berra.

=== July ===
- July 1 – Walt Kinney, 77, left-hander who pitched in 63 career games for the Boston Red Sox (1918) and Philadelphia Athletics (1919–1920 and 1923).
- July 2
  - Chester Emerson, 81, outfielder for the 1911–1912 Philadelphia Athletics.
  - Frank Mack, 71, pitcher who appeared in 27 games over three seasons (1922–1923, 1925) for the White Sox.
- July 7 – Ray Phelps, 67, pitcher in 126 games for the Brooklyn Robins and Dodgers (1930–1932) and Chicago White Sox (1935–1936).
- July 8 – Ed Doherty, 71, longtime baseball executive and the first general manager of the expansion Washington Senators (1960–1962).
- July 12
  - Wally Judnich, 54, center fielder who twice batted .300 for the St. Louis Browns; backup outfielder for 1948 World Series champion Cleveland Indians.
  - Ed Weiland, 56, pitcher who appeared in ten career games for the Chicago White Sox in 1940 and 1942.
- July 16
  - Earl McNeely, 73, outfielder and first baseman who played 683 games for the Washington Senators and St. Louis Browns between 1924 and 1931; his single that bounced over the head of New York Giants' third baseman Fred Lindstrom in the 12th inning of Game 7 won the 1924 World Series for Washington.
  - Harry Pattee, 89, second baseman who played 80 games for the 1908 Brooklyn Superbas.
- July 25 – John "Chief" Meyers, 90, catcher for New York Giants, Brooklyn Robins and Boston Braves (1909–1917); led National League catchers in put outs five straight seasons (1910–1914) and in on-base percentage (1912); batted .291 in 992 career games, enjoying three over-.300 campaigns.
- July 28 – Myril Hoag, 63, outfielder for the New York Yankees, St. Louis Browns, Chicago White Sox and Cleveland Indians over 13 seasons between 1931 and 1945 who recovered from a brutal 1936 collision to become an All-Star three years later.

=== August ===
- August 4 – Frank Lamanske, 64, left-handed pitcher who made two MLB appearances out of the bullpen for the 1935 Brooklyn Dodgers.
- August 11 – Rusty Pence, 71, pitcher in four games for the 1921 Chicago White Sox.
- August 12 – Shorty Dee, 81, Canadian-born 5 ft 6 in (1.68 m) shortstop who played one game in the majors on September 14, 1915, as a member of the St. Louis Browns.
- August 16 – Walter Mueller, 76, outfielder who played in 121 games for the Pittsburgh Pirates (1922–1924 and 1926); father of Don Mueller.
- August 18 – Jim McCloskey, 61, southpaw who pitched in four contests for the 1936 Boston Bees.
- August 24 – Mitch Chetkovich, 54, World War II-era pitcher for the 1945 Philadelphia Phillies who appeared in four early-season games.
- August 27 – Bill Clarkson, 72, pitcher who appeared in 51 games for the New York Giants and Boston Braves between 1927 and 1929.

=== September ===
- September 4 – Joe Hassler, 66, shortstop who played in 37 MLB games for the 1928 and 1929 Philadelphia Athletics and 1930 St. Louis Browns.
- September 6 – Artie Dede, 76, catcher in one game for the 1916 Brooklyn Robins who became a longtime scout for the Brooklyn Dodgers and New York Yankees.
- September 11 – Rube Melton, 54, pitcher who worked in 162 career games for the Philadelphia Phillies (1941–1942) and Brooklyn Dodgers (1943; 1946–1947).
- September 14 – Bill Holden, 82, outfielder who played in 79 career games for the 1913–1914 New York Yankees and the 1914 Cincinnati Reds.
- September 15 – Roberto Ortiz, 56, outfielder for the Washington Senators and Philadelphia Athletics who logged all or portions of six years in MLB between 1941 and 1950.
- September 17 – Hack Miller, 77, outfielder who batted .323 in 349 career games, 334 of them for the Chicago Cubs of 1922–1925; played briefly for the 1916 Brooklyn Robins and 1918 Boston Red Sox.
- September 20 – Tony Venzon, 56, National League umpire from 1957 until May 25, 1971, when he retired due to ill health; worked 2,226 league games, three World Series and three All-Star games.

=== October ===
- October 7 – Les Barnhart, 66, pitcher who had two brief trials with the Cleveland Indians in 1928 and 1930.
- October 8 – Murray Wall, 45, relief pitcher for the Boston Braves, Boston Red Sox and Washington Senators between 1950 and 1959.
- October 14 – Doc Prothro, 78, licensed dentist; third baseman for the Senators (1920; 1923–1924), Red Sox (1925) and Cincinnati Reds (1926); manager of Philadelphia Phillies (1939–1941); influential minor league manager and club owner; father of Tommy Prothro.
- October 16 – Dave Coble, 58, catcher who played in 15 games for 1939 Philadelphia Phillies.
- October 17 – Mike Massey, 78, infielder in 31 games for the 1917 Boston Braves.
- October 21 – William R. Daley, 79, principal owner of the Cleveland Indians (1956–1962) and Seattle Pilots (1969, their only year of existence).
- October 23
  - Jesse Petty, 76, left-handed pitcher who worked in 207 games for the Cleveland Indians (1921), Brooklyn Robins (1925–1928), Pittsburgh Pirates (1929–1930) and Chicago Cubs (1930).
  - Woody Upchurch, 60, left-handed pitcher who appeared in ten games for the 1935–1936 Philadelphia Athletics.

=== November ===
- November 4
  - Logan Hensley, 71, ace pitcher for the St. Louis Stars of the Negro National League between 1922 and 1931; twice led NNL in games won (1926, 1930).
  - Howard "Polly" McLarry, 80, infielder for the Chicago White Sox (1912) and Chicago Cubs (1915).
  - Bud Messenger, 73, pitcher who won his only two decisions in five games pitched for the 1924 Cleveland Indians.
- November 5
  - Toothpick Sam Jones, 45, pitcher who began career in the Negro leagues and appeared in 322 MLB games, principally with the Chicago Cubs, St. Louis Cardinals and San Francisco Giants, over 12 seasons between 1951 and 1964; led National League in strikeouts (1955, 1956, 1958), games won (21 in 1959) and earned run average (2.83 in 1959); threw a no-hitter (1955) and a seven-inning no-no (1959, in a game shortened by rain); two-time NL All-Star.
  - Joe Palmisano, 68, backup catcher who played in 19 games for the 1931 AL champion Philadelphia Athletics.
- November 9 – Bill Dreesen, 67, third baseman who played 48 games for 1931 Boston Braves.
- November 21 – Norm Branch, 56, relief pitcher who worked in 37 career games for 1941–1942 New York Yankees; member of 1941 World Series champions.
- November 24 – Ed Fallenstein, 62, pitcher in 33 total games, 29 in relief, for 1931 Philadelphia Phillies and 1933 Boston Braves.
- November – Ameal Brooks, 64, catcher/outfielder in the Negro leagues who played from 1928 to 1947.

=== December ===
- December 4 – Walter Ockey, 51, relief pitcher who worked in two games in May 1944 for the wartime-era New York Giants.
- December 12
  - George Dunlop, 83, infielder who appeared briefly for 1913–1914 Cleveland Naps.
  - Bill Kellogg, 87, first- and second baseman who appeared in 75 games for the 1914 Cincinnati Reds.
  - Nip Winters, 72, standout Negro leagues left-hander of the 1920s who led the Eastern Colored League in games won for four consecutive seasons (1923–1926).
- December 13 – Mike Ryba, 68, pitcher (in 240 games) and catcher (in ten games) who toiled for the St. Louis Cardinals (1935–1938) and Boston Red Sox (1941–1946); later a coach, minor league manager and longtime scout.
- December 16 – Ferdie Schupp, 80, pitcher who won 21 games for the 1917 New York Giants but whose career faltered after service in World War I.
- December 20 – Tom Fitzsimmons, 81, third baseman who got into four games for the 1919 Brooklyn Robins.
- December 26 – Cliff Daringer, 86, infielder who appeared in 64 games for 1914 Kansas City Packers (Federal League).
- December 30 – Tetelo Vargas, 65, Dominican All-Star outfielder who played in the Negro leagues between 1927 and 1944; batted .471 in 131 plate appearances for 1943 New York Cubans.
