= Alan Foster (baseball) =

American baseball player (born 1946)

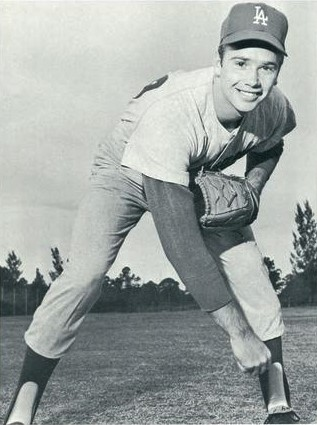
- Pitcher
- Born: December 8, 1946 (age 79); Pasadena, California, U.S.
- Batted: Right Threw: Right

MLB debut
- April 25, 1967, for the Los Angeles Dodgers

Last MLB appearance
- August 13, 1976, for the San Diego Padres

MLB statistics
- Win–loss record: 48–63
- Earned run average: 3.74
- Strikeouts: 501
- Stats at Baseball Reference

Teams
- Los Angeles Dodgers (1967–1970); Cleveland Indians (1971); California Angels (1972); St. Louis Cardinals (1973–1974); San Diego Padres (1975–1976)

Alan Benton Foster (born December 8, 1946) is an American former professional baseball player. He played in Major League Baseball as a right-handed pitcher from 1967 to 1976 for the Los Angeles Dodgers, Cleveland Indians, California Angels, St. Louis Cardinals and the San Diego Padres.

== Baseball career ==
Foster was born in Pasadena, California. He attended Los Altos High School (Hacienda Heights, California), and was listed as 6 feet (1.8 m) tall and 180 pounds (82 kg). He was drafted by the Los Angeles Dodgers of Major League Baseball in the second round of the 1965 Major League Baseball draft.

Pitching against the Pittsburgh Pirates at Dodger Stadium on August 6, 1969, Foster surrendered a home run to Pirate left fielder Willie Stargell that cleared the right field pavilion. Stargell's home run, the first to be hit completely out of the seven-year-old stadium, was measured at 507 feet (155 m), making it the longest home run ever hit in that park.

Foster was traded to the Cleveland Indians following the 1970 season. After one season in Cleveland, he was traded with outfielders Vada Pinson and Frank Baker to the California Angels for Alex Johnson and Jerry Moses. In November 1974, Foster was involved in a three-team deal in which he was traded along with Sonny Siebert and Rich Folkers from the Cardinals to the Padres for Ed Brinkman who had been sent to San Diego with Bob Strampe and Dick Sharon from the Detroit Tigers for Nate Colbert. Danny Breeden went from the Padres to the Cardinals to subsequently complete the transactions.

Over his career, Foster won 48 games, lost 63, and had an earned run average of 3.74. In 217 games pitched, including 148 starts, he posted 26 complete games and six shutouts. He allowed 988 hits and 383 bases on balls, with 501 strikeouts, in 1,0251/3 innings pitched. His best campaign came in 1973 for the Cardinals, as he set a personal best with 13 victories in 22 decisions with a 3.14 ERA.
