= Chico Ruiz =

Cuban baseball player (1938–1972)

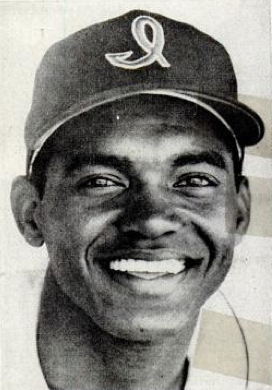
- Ruiz in 1962
- Infielder
- Born: December 5, 1938; Santo Domingo, Cuba
- Died: February 9, 1972 (aged 33); San Diego, California, U.S.
- Batted: Switch Threw: Right

MLB debut
- April 13, 1964, for the Cincinnati Reds

Last MLB appearance
- August 3, 1971, for the California Angels

MLB statistics
- Batting average: .240
- Home runs: 2
- Runs batted in: 69
- Stats at Baseball Reference

Teams
- Cincinnati Reds (1964–1969); California Angels (1970–1971)

Hiraldo Sablón Ruiz (December 5, 1938 – February 9, 1972), known in the United States as Chico Ruiz, was a Cuban-American professional baseball player. An infielder, Ruiz played in Major League Baseball for the Cincinnati Reds and California Angels from 1964 through 1971. He was the only major-league player ever to pinch-hit for Johnny Bench. He is, however, best remembered for a play he made his rookie season. His steal of home against the Philadelphia Phillies on September 21, 1964 has entered baseball folklore. Viewed by most over the years as "mad" or "zany," the play received a revisionist defense that put it in perspective as a daring and worthwhile gamble. It is often viewed as the turning point of the Phillies late season standings collapse in 1964.

== Early years ==
Ruiz was born in Santo Domingo, Cuba, on December 5, 1938. His father, who owned a cigar factory, wanted Giraldo to succeed him in running the business. However, Chico attended college, where he studied architecture. His brother, Julio, later headed the labor force of Cubatabaco, which absorbed the Sablón business and various other private-sector tobacco enterprises.

Ruiz signed with the Cincinnati Redlegs in 1958 at age 19. He was among the last of the Cuban players to make it out of Cuba before the borders were sealed. He batted .275 with 28 home runs over six seasons in their farm system before making the renamed Cincinnati Reds out of spring training in 1964. Though he was a shortstop by trade, he made all 79 of his appearances on the field at either second or third base.

Ruiz married Isabel Suárez Navarro on October 4, 1961. They later had two daughters, Isis and Bárbara Isa.

== "The Curse of Chico Ruiz" ==
On September 21, 1964, facing Art Mahaffey and the Philadelphia Phillies, Ruiz singled with one out in the sixth and the score 0–0. He advanced to third base on a single by Vada Pinson; however, Pinson made the second out of the inning trying to stretch it into a double. With two outs, Frank Robinson stepped to the plate.

Though in later years Mahaffey recalled he had gotten two strikes on Robinson, newspaper accounts at the time showed, in actuality, the count was 0–1. Ruiz, noting Mahaffey had used a long windup on the first pitch, broke for home on the next delivery. Seeing the runner, a rattled Mahaffey rushed and uncorked a pitch which Phillies catcher Clay Dalrymple could not handle. Ruiz stole home, accounting for the only run of the game. Then and later, Ruiz's decision was viewed as a bad one, considering that Robinson—Cincinnati's best hitter—was up. Sabermetric analysis, however, shows that it was not a bad percentage play.

At the start of that game, the Phillies had a 6 1/2-game hold on first place with 12 games to play. The Phillies then lost ten straight games to finish tied for second place. Phillies third baseman Dick Allen is quoted in Crash, The Life and Times of Dick Allen by Tim Whitaker as saying that the play "broke our humps". Chico Ruiz's steal of home has evolved into a popular culture legend. Some Philadelphia sports fans still refer to the "Curse of Chico Ruiz" as the reason for many of the misfortunes of the team over time.

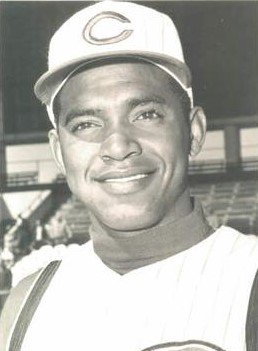
Ruiz with the Cincinnati Reds

== "Bench me or trade me" ==
With Pete Rose at second base, Deron Johnson at third base, and Leo Cárdenas at shortstop, Ruiz found himself excluded from a strong infield and consequently experienced limited playing time over the subsequent two seasons. To enhance his comfort while on the bench, he utilized a cushion, wore a pair of specially designed soft alligator spiked shoes, and employed a battery-operated fan that was gifted to him by fans in St. Louis during their games, allowing him to remain cool and comfortable while not actively participating in the game.

His chance finally arrived in 1967 when Cárdenas broke his finger. He performed admirably in Cárdenas' absence, batting .283 with five runs scored and four runs batted in while providing solid defense at short. This was followed with a two-week stint at second while second baseman Tommy Helms shifted over to short. During the hot summer stretch, Ruiz said playing every day was killing him and jokingly demanded to Reds manager Dave Bristol, "Bench me or trade me."

Regardless of his "demand", Ruiz remained with the Reds for two more seasons. Following the 1969 season, he and outfielder Alex Johnson were traded to the California Angels for pitchers Pedro Borbón, Jim McGlothlin and Vern Geishert.

== Angels and Alex Johnson ==
Despite Johnson having a reputation as a malcontent, he and Ruiz were good friends. In fact, Ruiz was the godfather of Johnson's adopted daughter. Johnson won the American League batting crown in 1970, their first season together with the Angels. However, during spring training in 1971 several bouts of "indifferent play" landed him in the middle of Angels manager Lefty Phillips' crosshairs. The trend continued into the regular season as Johnson was benched three times in May for indifferent play. Meanwhile, the relationship between Ruiz and Johnson also began to sour. Johnson would scream obscenities at Ruiz whenever they were near each other, and Ruiz had reportedly challenged Johnson to a fight on more than one occasion, regardless of the fact that Ruiz was much smaller.

Tensions hit a climax when Johnson claimed that Ruiz pointed a gun at him while the two were in the clubhouse following a June 13 loss to the Washington Senators. Ruiz denied the claim but Angels GM Dick Walsh later admitted during Johnson's arbitration case over his suspension that the incident had indeed occurred. Shortly after the alleged incident, Ruiz was demoted to the Triple-A Salt Lake City Angels.

The Angels would clean house after the season. Phillips and Walsh were both fired, Johnson was traded to the Cleveland Indians, and Ruiz was released. Shortly afterwards, Ruiz signed with the Kansas City Royals.

== Death ==
Ruiz became a United States citizen on January 7, 1972, something which made him very proud. Just before joining the Royals, Ruiz was driving on Interstate 5 in San Diego, California on the morning of February 9, when his car, operating between 70–80 miles per hour (110–130 km/h), veered off the road and crashed into a highway sign post at full speed. Ruiz was taken to Palomar Hospital in Escondido, California, where he was declared dead upon arrival. Despite the animosity between Ruiz and Johnson at the end of the 1971 season, Alex Johnson attended Ruiz's funeral on February 11. No active players from the Angels were present at the funeral.

== See also ==
- List of baseball players who died during their careers
