= Harvey Shank =

Canadian baseball player (born 1946)

- Pitcher
- Born: July 29, 1946 (age 78); Toronto, Ontario, Canada
- Batted: Right Threw: Right

MLB debut
- May 16, 1970, for the California Angels

Last MLB appearance
- May 16, 1970, for the California Angels

MLB statistics
- Win–loss record: 0–0
- Earned run average: 0.00
- Strikeouts: 1
- Stats at Baseball Reference

Teams
- California Angels (1970)

Harvey Tillman Shank (born July 29, 1946) is a former professional baseball pitcher. He played in one game for the 1970 California Angels of Major League Baseball (MLB). Listed at 6 feet 4 inches (1.93 m) and 220 pounds (100 kg), he threw and batted right-handed.

== Biography ==
Shank attended Wheaton College in Illinois where he played college basketball on a team which defeated both Notre Dame and Portland) as well as college baseball. After one year, he transferred to Stanford University, and was selected by the California Angels in the 10th round of the 1968 MLB draft. He then had a four-season minor league career, playing from 1968 through 1971 within the Angels' farm system. He pitched in 134 minor league games (17 starts) compiling a win–loss record of 23–15 with a 3.57 earned run average (ERA).

Shank's lone major league appearance was with the Angels on May 16, 1970, in an away game against the Oakland Athletics. With the Angels losing, 7–2, Shank entered the game in the bottom of the fifth inning. He pitched three scoreless innings, allowing two hits and two walks while recording one strikeout (that of catcher Dave Duncan). Shank left the game in the top of the eighth inning, when Chico Ruiz replaced him as a pinch hitter.

Following his baseball career, Shank worked as a sales and marketing executive for the Phoenix Suns of the National Basketball Association for over 40 years.
