= Wally Wolf (baseball) =

American baseball player (1942–2020)

- Pitcher
- Born: January 5, 1942; Los Angeles, California, U.S.
- Died: July 7, 2020 (aged 78); Los Angeles, California, U.S.
- Batted: Right Threw: Right

MLB debut
- September 27, 1969, for the California Angels

Last MLB appearance
- May 5, 1970, for the California Angels

MLB statistics
- Win–loss record: 0–0
- Earned run average: 7.04
- Strikeouts: 7
- Stats at Baseball Reference

Teams
- California Angels (1969–1970)

Walter Beck Wolf (January 5, 1942 – July 7, 2020) was an American professional baseball pitcher. He played for two seasons in Major League Baseball for the California Angels, appearing in two games during the 1969 California Angels season and four games during the 1970 California Angels season. He died on July 7, 2020, in Los Angeles, California.
