= 1971 Big League World Series =

Tournament details
- Country: United States
- City: Fort Lauderdale, Florida
- Dates: 16–21 August 1971
- Teams: 7

Final positions
- Champions: Cupertino, California
- Runner-up: Lincolnwood, Illinois

The 1971 Big League World Series took place from August 16–21 in Fort Lauderdale, Florida, United States. Cupertino, California defeated Lincolnwood, Illinois twice in the championship game.

== Teams ==
United States	International
(Florida) Fort Lauderdale, Florida Host	Canada
(New York (state)) New Hyde Park, New York East	(West Germany) Heidelberg, West Germany Europe
(Illinois) Lincolnwood, Illinois North	
(North Carolina) Kernersville, North Carolina South
(California) Cupertino, California; District 44; West

== Results ==
Upper round 1	Upper round 2	Upper final	Championship
—	California	7
1–0	Canada	4
—	Canada	4
—	(New York (state)) New York	0
1–0	California	3
2–0	Illinois	5
—	Florida	2
—	Illinois (F/10)	4
1–0	Illinois	7
1–0	North Carolina	0
—	North Carolina	2
—	West Germany	1
3–0	Illinois	0	0
2–1	California	2	4
Lower round 1	Lower round 2	Lower round 3	Lower final
1–1	North Carolina	0
0–1	Florida	9	1–1	Florida	1	1–1	California	13
0–1	West Germany	1	2–1	Florida	5	2–1	(New York (state)) New York	1
1–1	(New York (state)) New York	6
1–1	Canada	0
0–1	(New York (state)) New York	1

1971 Big League World Series Champions
District 44 LL
Cupertino, California
