= 1971 Senior League World Series =

American youth baseball tournament

Tournament information
- Location: Gary, Indiana
- Dates: August 16–21, 1971

Final positions
- Champions: La Habra, California
- Runner-up: Richmond, Virginia

The 1971 Senior League World Series took place from August 16–21 in Gary, Indiana, United States. La Habra, California defeated Richmond, Virginia in the championship game.

== Teams ==
United States	International
(Indiana) Jeffersonville, Indiana Host	Whalley, British Columbia Canada
(New Jersey) Pequannock Township, New Jersey East	(West Germany) Wiesbaden, West Germany Europe
(Wisconsin) Madison, Wisconsin; West Madison; North	Nuevo Laredo, Mexico Mexico
(Virginia) Richmond, Virginia South	Mayagüez, Puerto Rico Puerto Rico
(California) La Habra, California West	

== Results ==
Winner's Bracket

Opening Game
—	Indiana	3
—	Wisconsin	4

First Round
1–0	Wisconsin (F/9)	2
—	Mexico	1
—	New Jersey	7
—	Puerto Rico	5
—	California	2
—	Canada	0
—	West Germany	3
—	Virginia	5

—
2–0	Wisconsin	3
1–0	New Jersey	4
1–0	California	5
1–0	Virginia	2

Bracket Final
2–0	New Jersey	1
2–0	California (F/17)	3

Loser's Bracket

—
1
0–1	Indiana	1
2
7
3
6
0–1	Mexico	2
5

—
0–1	Puerto Rico	5
1–1	Mexico	2
0–1	Canada	14
0–1	West Germany	3

—
2–1	Wisconsin	8
1–1	Puerto Rico	1
1–1	Virginia	8
1–1	Canada	4

Bracket Final
3–1	Wisconsin	1
2–1	Virginia (F/8)	3

Elimination Round

Semifinals
2–0	New Jersey	1
2–0	California (F/17)	3
2–1	New Jersey
2–1	Virginia

World Championship
3–0	California	1
3–1	Virginia	0

1971 Senior League World Series Champions
La Habra, California
