= Tom Fitzsimmons (baseball) =

American baseball player

- Third baseman
- Born: April 6, 1890; Oakland, California, U.S.
- Died: December 20, 1971 (aged 81); Oakland, California, U.S.
- Batted: Right Threw: Right

MLB debut
- June 12, 1919, for the Brooklyn Robins

Last MLB appearance
- June 25, 1919, for the Brooklyn Robins

MLB statistics
- Batting average: .000
- Home runs: 0
- Runs batted in: 0
- Stats at Baseball Reference

Teams
- Brooklyn Robins (1919)

Thomas William Fitzsimmons (April 6, 1890 – December 20, 1971) was an American professional baseball player who played third base in four games for the Brooklyn Robins during the 1919 baseball season. He was born in Oakland, California, and attended Saint Mary's College of California.
