= Eric Moody =

American baseball player (born 1971)

- Pitcher
- Born: January 6, 1971 (age 55); Greenville, South Carolina, U.S.
- Batted: Right Threw: Right

MLB debut
- August 3, 1997, for the Texas Rangers

Last MLB appearance
- September 18, 1997, for the Texas Rangers

MLB statistics
- Win–loss record: 0–1
- Earned run average: 4.26
- Strikeouts: 12
- Stats at Baseball Reference

Teams
- Texas Rangers (1997)

Eric Lane Moody (born January 6, 1971) is an American former Major League Baseball pitcher. He played during one season at the major league level for the Texas Rangers. He was drafted by the Rangers in the 24th round of the 1993 amateur draft. Moody played his first professional season with their Class A- Erie Sailors in 1993, and his last with the Pittsburgh Pirates' Triple-A club, the Nashville Sounds, in 2001.
