= Greg Garrett (baseball) =

American baseball player (1947–2003)

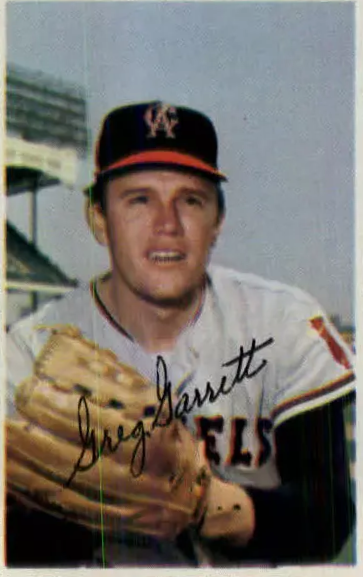
- Garrett in 1970
- Relief pitcher
- Born: March 12, 1947; Atascadero, California, U.S.
- Died: June 7, 2003 (aged 56); Santa Clarita, California, U.S.
- Batted: Switch Threw: Left

debut
- April 24, 1970, for the California Angels

Last MLB appearance
- April 18, 1971, for the Cincinnati Reds

MLB statistics
- Win–loss record: 5–7
- Earned run average: 2.48
- Strikeouts: 55
- Innings pitched: 83⅓
- Stats at Baseball Reference

Teams
- California Angels (1970); Cincinnati Reds (1971)

Gregory Garrett (March 12, 1947 – June 7, 2003) was an American professional baseball player, a left-handed pitcher who appeared in 34 Major League games (eight as a starting pitcher) over two seasons for the California Angels and Cincinnati Reds of Major League Baseball. Garrett attended Washington State University, where he played college baseball for the Cougars in the 1967 season. He was traded from the Angels to the Reds for Jim Maloney on December 15, 1970. After retiring from baseball, Garrett died on June 7, 2003, at the age of 56.
