= Dick Walsh (executive) =

- Born: October 30, 1925; South Bend, Indiana, U.S.
- Died: May 6, 2011 (aged 85); Fullerton, California, U.S.
- Occupation(s): Baseball executive Commissioner, North American Soccer League; Convention center executive
- Years active: 1948–2005

Richard Bishop Walsh Jr. (October 30, 1925 – May 6, 2011) was an American professional sports and events industry executive who, during a 50-plus year career, held high-level positions in Major League Baseball, professional soccer (he was the first commissioner of the North American Soccer League), and in convention center management. He was born in South Bend, Indiana, spent his early years in Evanston, Illinois, and moved to Los Angeles with his family as a boy.

== Early baseball career with the Dodgers ==
Walsh's first career was in baseball. After attending Los Angeles High School, where he was an All-City third baseman in 1943, and military service during World War II, Walsh joined the Brooklyn Dodgers organization in 1948 as a member of the front office staff of the Fort Worth Cats, Brooklyn's farm club in the Double-A Texas League. He became the parent team's assistant minor league director, working under Fresco Thompson, in 1951.

When the Dodgers acquired the Los Angeles franchise of the Pacific Coast League in February 1957 — the precursor of the Brooklyn club's historic shift to the West Coast, which would follow at the close of the 1957 season — Walsh, as an Angeleno, became president of the minor league team and a liaison between the Dodgers and the city of Los Angeles. Then, after the Brooklyn club moved West in 1958, Walsh became assistant general manager of the Dodgers. He focused on the team's efforts to build a ballpark in Chavez Ravine, and when Dodger Stadium opened as a state-of-the-art facility in 1962, Walsh was named director of stadium operations.

== Soccer commissioner, then Angel GM ==
After 18 years with the Dodgers, he was chosen to serve as commissioner of first the United Soccer Association (USA) in 1966, then the North American Soccer League (NASL), which resulted from the merger of the USA and the National Professional Soccer League (NPSL) in 1968. He served the NASL through its first full season, 1968, then returned to baseball.

In October 1968, Fred Haney, the 72-year-old general manager of the California Angels, retired and Walsh was named his successor by Angel owner Gene Autry. Walsh had to rebuild the team's front office, as in the months just prior to Haney's retirement, his two top aides, Marvin Milkes and Cedric Tallis, left to take over the two American League expansion teams set to debut in 1969, the Seattle Pilots and Kansas City Royals.

Walsh then faced another test after the 1969 season began, when the Angels lost 28 of their first 39 games. Walsh fired Bill Rigney, the only manager in the club's Major League history to that point, and replaced him with Lefty Phillips, who had just joined the Angel front office after a long career as a scout and pitching coach with the Dodgers.

The Phillips hiring pulled the Angels out of their tailspin and they finished third that season in the American League West Division. Then during the 1969–70 offseason, Walsh acquired the highly talented but controversial outfielder Alex Johnson in an inter-league trade with the Cincinnati Reds. Johnson was a feared batter, but disciplinary problems had caused three National League teams to give up on him. In 1970, Johnson put those problems behind him. He batted .329 with 202 hits and captured the AL batting title, while the Angels won 86 games and finished a strong third in their division. During the 1970–71 offseason, Walsh traded for another heavy-hitting outfielder, Tony Conigliaro of the Boston Red Sox, who had hit 36 home runs, fourth in the American League, during 1970.

The 1971 season began with the Angels considered probable AL West contenders. But Johnson and Phillips clashed over the outfielder's on-field behavior, resulting in multiple team suspensions. Johnson was handed a season-ending ban on June 26 (which he contested in court); his year ended after only 65 games and saw his average decline almost 70 points, with two home runs. Conigliaro played in only 74 games and was batting .222 with four home runs when he announced his retirement on July 11. The 26-year-old had battled vision problems since he was seriously beaned in an August 18, 1967, game—ironically, against the Angels. The 1971 Angels fell below .500 in mid-May, then finished ten games and two notches below Tallis' three-year-old Royals. Walsh was fired on October 20, 1971 despite four years remaining on his seven‐year contract. Harry Dalton succeeded him one week later on October 27.

== Convention center director ==
The firing ended Walsh's baseball career. In 1974, he became executive director of the Los Angeles Convention Center and held the post for nearly 24 years, a period during which Los Angeles hosted the 1984 Summer Olympics and began planning the construction of another state-of-the-art venue, the Staples Center. The Convention Center oversaw two expansion projects during Walsh's tenure: one in 1981 with the addition of the North Hall, and another in 1991 that saw the opening of the South Hall, which opened in 1993.

During this phase of his career, Walsh earned a master's degree in public administration from California State University, Fullerton in 1976 and a law degree from Western State University College of Law in 1984. After leaving the LACC in 1997, Walsh supervised the opening or operations of convention facilities in Hawaii and Alaska before becoming the executive director of the Ontario, California, Convention Center from 2002 to 2005.

Walsh died of natural causes on May 6, 2011, at the age of 85.

== See also ==
- Baseball America Executive Database.
- San Bernardino Business Press, Knight Ridder/Tribune Business News, December 13, 2004.

Preceded by Fred Haney	California Angels General Manager; 1968–1971	Succeeded by Harry Dalton
