= Terry Cox (baseball) =

American baseball player (born 1949)

- Relief pitcher
- Born: March 30, 1949 (age 76); Odessa, Texas, U.S.
- Batted: Right Threw: Right

MLB debut
- September 7, 1970, for the California Angels

Last MLB appearance
- September 24, 1970, for the California Angels

MLB statistics
- Win–loss record: 0-0
- Earned run average: 3.86
- Strikeouts: 3
- Stats at Baseball Reference

Teams
- California Angels (1970)

Terry Lee Cox (born March 30, 1949) is an American former professional baseball player who played one season for the California Angels of Major League Baseball.
