= Alex Johnson =

American baseball player (1942–2015)

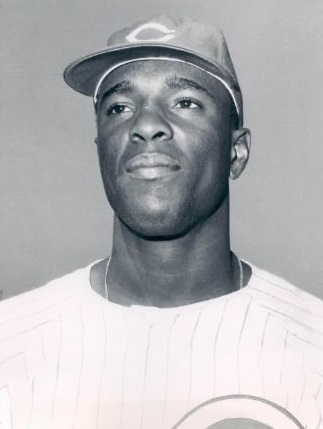
- Johnson in 1968
- Left fielder
- Born: December 7, 1942; Helena, Arkansas, U.S.
- Died: February 28, 2015 (aged 72); Detroit, Michigan, U.S.
- Batted: Right Threw: Right

MLB debut
- July 25, 1964, for the Philadelphia Phillies

Last MLB appearance
- October 1, 1976, for the Detroit Tigers

MLB statistics
- Batting average: .288
- Home runs: 78
- Runs batted in: 525
- Stats at Baseball Reference

Teams
- Philadelphia Phillies (1964–1965); St. Louis Cardinals (1966–1967); Cincinnati Reds (1968–1969); California Angels (1970–1971); Cleveland Indians (1972); Texas Rangers (1973–1974); New York Yankees (1974–1975); Detroit Tigers (1976)

Career highlights and awards
- All-Star (1970); AL batting champion (1970)

Alex Johnson (December 7, 1942 – February 28, 2015) was an American professional baseball outfielder, who played in Major League Baseball (MLB), from 1964 to 1976, for the Philadelphia Phillies, St. Louis Cardinals, Cincinnati Reds, California Angels, Cleveland Indians, Texas Rangers, New York Yankees, and Detroit Tigers. He was the National League Comeback Player of the Year in 1968 and an American League All-Star and batting champion in 1970. His brother, Ron, was an NFL running back, most notably for the New York Giants.

== Early years ==
Johnson was born in Helena, Arkansas, and grew up in Detroit, Michigan with his two brothers and sisters. One brother Ron Johnson, was an NFL running back from 1969 to 1976. Alex played sandlot ball with Bill Freehan, Willie Horton, and Dennis Ribant.

Johnson attended Northwestern High School, where he excelled as an offensive lineman for the school's football team. He received a scholarship offer to attend Michigan State University to play football for the Michigan State Spartans, but opted to sign with the Philadelphia Phillies instead.

== Philadelphia Phillies ==
Johnson worked his way up the ranks quickly in the Phillies' farm system, batting .322 with 40 home runs and 187 runs batted in across two seasons to earn a spot on the Phillies' bench for the start of the 1964 season. However, he was optioned back to the Arkansas Travelers of the Pacific Coast League without having logged a major league at-bat in order to make room on the major league roster for relief pitcher Ed Roebuck, who was acquired from the Washington Senators shortly after the season started.

Johnson soon earned a call back up to the majors as he batted .316 with 21 home runs and 71 RBIs in just over half a season with Arkansas. In his Major League Baseball debut, Johnson went 3-for-4 with a walk, two RBIs and a run scored. He remained hot for his first month in the majors, batting .400 with one home run and nine RBIs through August. He eventually settled into a lefty-righty platoon with Wes Covington in left field, which he would do through the 1965 season. That October, the Phillies traded Johnson, Pat Corrales and Art Mahaffey to the St. Louis Cardinals for Bill White, Dick Groat and Bob Uecker.

== St. Louis Cardinals ==
To make room for Johnson in left field, St. Louis shifted Hall of Famer Lou Brock to right field. Along with Curt Flood in center, the Cardinals boasted one of the top young outfields in the National League heading into the 1966 season. However, Johnson batted just .186 with two home runs and six RBIs through May 17 when he was sent down to the Tulsa Oilers of the Triple-A Pacific Coast League (PCL). That year, he was named the "Most Dangerous Hitter" in the PCL.

Johnson returned to the Cardinals in 1967, batting .223 with one home run and twelve RBIs mostly as a pinch hitter and back up for Roger Maris in right field. The Cardinals defeated the Boston Red Sox in the World Series that year, though Johnson did not appear in the post-season. Just before spring training 1968, he was traded to the Cincinnati Reds for Dick Simpson.

== Cincinnati Reds ==
Pete Rose, the left fielder in Cincinnati in 1967, was shifted to right field for 1968. Mack Jones, a left-handed hitter acquired from the Atlanta Braves shortly before Johnson, was the early favorite to inherit the left field job. While Johnson was labelled as "moody" and "uncoachable" during his days with the Phillies and Cardinals, he impressed Reds manager Dave Bristol that spring and was given the starting job in left field even though a lefthanded bat would have been more suitable for the Reds' line-up.

By the time Johnson joined the Reds, he had a reputation as a notoriously slow starter. After batting .259 with four RBIs through April, Johnson got hot in May, batting .366 to move into the National League batting race. He finished the season at .312, fourth in the league behind Rose and two of the Alou brothers (Matty and Felipe), to be named the Sporting News' National League Comeback Player of the Year.

Though his potential to hit for power was recognized throughout his early career, he entered the 1969 season having hit just 17 career home runs. He matched that total in 1969, while also driving in a career high 88 runs and scoring a career high 86 runs. He also finished sixth in the N.L. with a .315 batting average.

Despite his hitting prowess, Johnson was a defensive liability as he led National League outfielders in errors both seasons in Cincinnati. In need of pitching, and with outfield prospect Bernie Carbo ready to jump to the majors, the Reds dealt Johnson and utility infielder Chico Ruiz to the California Angels for Pedro Borbón, Jim McGlothlin, and Vern Geishert.

== California Angels ==
Johnson hit the ground running in California, leading the league with a .366 batting average through May. He cooled off as the 1970 season progressed, but still went into the All-star break at .328 to earn selection to the A.L. squad. He remained in the batting title race throughout the season, and went into the final game of the season with batting average which was .002 behind Boston's Carl Yastrzemski. In the last game of the season against the White Sox, Johnson went two-for-three to win the A.L. batting title by 0.0004 over Yastrzemski. He was removed from the game after his third at-bat, to ensure the title.

Johnson became the subject of some controversy toward the end of his first season in California when he was fined by Angels manager Lefty Phillips for not running out a grounder. This continued into the following spring, when Phillips fined Johnson $100 for loafing in an exhibition game. The following day, Phillips removed Johnson from a second exhibition after he failed to run out a first-inning grounder.

Things deteriorated during the 1971 regular season as Johnson was benched three times in May for indifferent play. On June 4, he was pulled in the first inning of a 10–1 loss to the Red Sox when he failed to run all the way to first base on a routine ground ball. After being replaced by Tony González in left field, Johnson intimated that some of his battles with teammates and management were racially motivated.

Hell yes, I'm bitter. I've been bitter ever since I learned I was black. The society into which I was born and in which I grew up and in which I play ball today is anti-black. My attitude is nothing more than a reaction of their attitude.

Following a June 13 loss to the Washington Senators, Johnson claimed that Chico Ruiz, who had been a close friend and was the godfather of Johnson's adopted daughter, pointed a gun at him while the two were in the clubhouse. Ruiz denied the claim.

Johnson, limited as a fielder, stopped taking outfield practice before games. In June, after a potential trade deadline deal with the Milwaukee Brewers for Tommy Harper fell through, Johnson told reporters that he needed to get out of California, and that "playing in hell" would be an improvement. Johnson was benched after he loafed on two balls hit to him in left field against Milwaukee, which resulted in a five-run fourth inning for the Brewers, and failed to run out a ground ball in his final at-bat in the ninth inning. Phillips put it simply, "If you had seen him play lately, you'd know why he isn't in the line-up."

By the end of June, Johnson had been benched five times and fined 29 times. On June 26, Angels GM Dick Walsh suspended him without pay indefinitely for "not using his best efforts."

=== Grievance and arbitration ===
Marvin Miller, executive director of the Major League Baseball Players Association, immediately filed a grievance against the Angels on Johnson's behalf claiming that Walsh failed to properly outline the basis for the suspension in specific terms. His case, however, was weakened when Johnson defended his actions rather than deny the claims made against him by his ballclub. He admitted to not being in the spirit to play properly as the whole team was indifferent toward playing together. Miller eventually ended up filing a grievance on Johnson's behalf suggesting that Johnson was emotionally disabled.

Regardless of the grievance, Phillips remained defiant that Johnson would not be returning to his ballclub (Phillips' stance was perhaps, in part, due to the fact that his fourth place team was suddenly playing better – 17–11 in the month of July.) When a meeting between Miller and the Owners' Players' Relations committee on July 21 failed to resolve the grievance, it went to an independent arbitrator.

After a 30-day suspension, the longest the Angels could give, Commissioner of Baseball Bowie Kuhn placed Johnson on the restricted list, allowing the Angels to continue the suspension. On August 10, Phillips, the Angels' coaches and six players (including team captain Jim Fregosi) met with Kuhn's labor advisor John Gaherin, who was part of the three-man arbitration panel attempting to resolve the case along with Miller and professional Arbitrator Lewis Gill of the National Labor Relations Board. On August 31, the panel indefinitely postponed a decision on Johnson's appeal, and indicated that they were unlikely to come to an agreement before the end of the regular season.

The Angels' case against Johnson hit a snag on September 7, when the Chicago Sun-Times reported that Walsh had lied about the gun incident with Ruiz, and ordered that the weapon be concealed. Based on the findings of two psychiatrists, Gill found in favor of Johnson, determining that an emotional disturbance was no worse than a physical ailment, and that the Angels should not have suspended him, but rather should have placed Johnson on the disabled list. Johnson was awarded $29,970 in back pay (as players on the disabled list still receive full pay); however, Gill upheld the $3,750 in fines he received from the team.

== Cleveland Indians ==
After the season, the Angels cleaned house. Phillips and Walsh were both fired, Ruiz was released, and Johnson was traded to the Cleveland Indians with Jerry Moses for Vada Pinson, Alan Foster, and Frank Baker.

While more "emotional disturbance" followed Johnson to his new club when Ruiz was killed in an auto accident on February 9, 1972 (Johnson attended the funeral), Johnson got off to a fast start for the Indians, as his batting average reached .328 on May 6. But a 6-for-66 slump brought his average down to .208 by June. Johnson appeared to be rebounding when he learned that Phillips, who had been rehired by the Angels as a scout, had had a fatal asthma attack on June 12. He then went into a 5-for-37 slump that dropped his season average to .219.

Johnson's hitting problems were blamed on a heel injury, which limited him to pinch hitting during the first half of August. He resumed his role of everyday left fielder on August 19, and batted .351 over the rest of the season.

== Texas Rangers ==
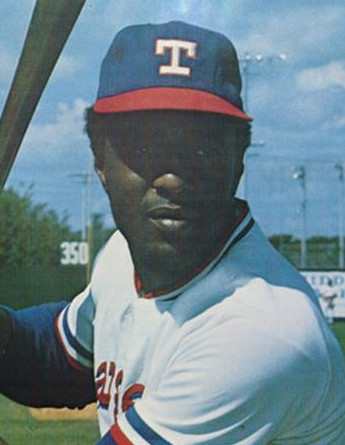
Johnson in 1974

Johnson held out for a new contract with the Indians the following spring. Unable to reach an agreement, they traded him to the Texas Rangers for pitchers Rich Hinton and Vince Colbert. Rangers manager Whitey Herzog made it clear upon his team's acquisition of Johnson that he would release Johnson immediately if he turned out to be a discipline problem with his club. However, with the American League's institution of the designated hitter rule in 1973, Johnson was able to provide strong offensive production for the Rangers without hindering his team defensively, and soon won over his new manager. He appeared in 116 games at DH while spelling an occasional day off for Rico Carty in left in an additional forty games, and batted .287 with eight home runs and 68 RBIs. His 179 hits were the fifth most in the AL, and he held the Senators/Rangers franchise record in that category until 1979.

Johnson became an everyday outfielder again when Billy Martin took over as Rangers manager toward the end of the 1973 season. At first, Johnson and Martin got along, but by the time the Rangers sold Johnson's contract to the New York Yankees on September 9, 1974, Martin had also gotten fed up with him.

== New York Yankees ==
Johnson joined a Yankees club that was in first place by one game over the Baltimore Orioles in the American League East. In his first game as a Yankee, he hit an extra innings home run to defeat the Boston Red Sox. It was, however, his only highlight with the Yankees as he batted just .214 in ten games with his new club, and the Orioles won the division by two games.

He started the 1975 season as the Yankees' regular DH, but a knee injury limited his role. After Billy Martin was named Yankees manager on August 2, Johnson logged just nine more at-bats before he was released on September 2.

== Detroit Tigers ==
Johnson signed with his hometown Detroit Tigers for the 1976 season, and enjoyed something of a resurgent year as he batted .268 with six home runs and 45 RBIs as his team's everyday left fielder. Regardless, he was released at the end of the season. He played briefly with the Mexican League's Diablos Rojos del México before retiring.

== Post-retirement ==
After Johnson retired, he returned to Detroit and in 1985, after his father's death, took over Johnson Trucking Service, which was founded by his father, Arthur Johnson, in the 1940s. The company rents dump trucks to construction companies. In 1998, he told Sports Illustrated "Do I enjoy my life?" Johnson asks rhetorically. "I enjoy not being on an airplane all the time. I enjoy not having to face everything I did. I just want to help people with their vehicles. It's a nice, normal life — the thing I've always wanted."

== Personal life ==
Johnson married Julia Augusta in 1963, and they adopted daughter Jenifer in 1969 and had son Alex Jr. in 1972. Alex and Julia divorced after his baseball career ended.

Johnson died on February 28, 2015, from complications of prostate cancer.

== Career statistics ==
Games	PA	AB	R	H	2B	3B	HR	RBI	SB	BB	BA	OBP	SLG	FLD%
1322	4948	4623	550	1331	180	33	78	525	113	244	.288	.326	.392	.953

== See also ==
- List of Major League Baseball batting champions
