= Marc Sagmoen =

American baseball player (born 1971)

- Outfielder
- Born: April 16, 1971 (age 54); Seattle, Washington, U.S.
- Batted: Left Threw: Left

MLB debut
- April 15, 1997, for the Texas Rangers

Last MLB appearance
- September 20, 1997, for the Texas Rangers

MLB statistics
- Batting average: .140
- Home runs: 1
- Runs batted in: 4
- Stats at Baseball Reference

Teams
- Texas Rangers (1997)

Marc Richard Sagmoen (born April 16, 1971) is an American former professional baseball outfielder. He was drafted by the Texas Rangers in the 13th round of the 1993 Major League Baseball draft and signed on June 8, 1993. After retiring from baseball, Sagmoen became a police officer in Seattle.

== Inside-the-park home run ==
Sagmoen is one of the few players to record his first Major League base hit as an inside-the-park home run. It would also be the only home run he hit. This came on April 17, 1997, at Kauffman Stadium against the Kansas City Royals in the top of the 5th inning versus Tim Belcher. The Rangers won the game 5 to 1.

== Jersey number ==
Sagmoen made his Major League debut on April 15, 1997, wearing the #42 that he had been assigned by Rangers management. On that same day Major League Baseball retired the number league-wide in tribute to Jackie Robinson, commemorating the 50th anniversary of Robinson breaking the color barrier in 1947. Therefore Sagmoen became the last player to make his debut in the number.
