= Vada Pinson =

American baseball player and coach (1938–1995)

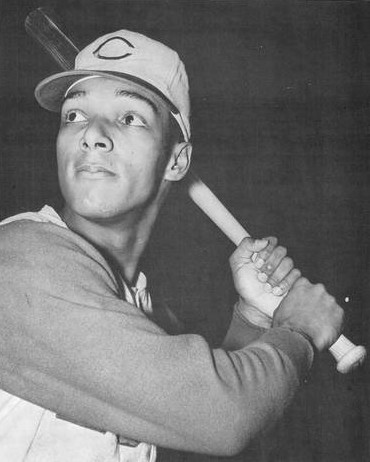
- Pinson in 1961
- Outfielder
- Born: August 11, 1938; Memphis, Tennessee, U.S.
- Died: October 21, 1995 (aged 57); Oakland, California, U.S.
- Batted: Left Threw: Left

MLB debut
- April 15, 1958, for the Cincinnati Redlegs

Last MLB appearance
- September 28, 1975, for the Kansas City Royals

MLB statistics
- Batting average: .286
- Hits: 2,757
- Home runs: 256
- Runs batted in: 1,169
- Stats at Baseball Reference

Teams
- Cincinnati Redlegs / Reds (1958–1968); St. Louis Cardinals (1969); Cleveland Indians (1970–1971); California Angels (1972–1973); Kansas City Royals (1974–1975)

Career highlights and awards
- 4× All-Star (1959–1960²); Gold Glove Award (1961); Cincinnati Reds Hall of Fame

Vada Edward Pinson Jr. (August 11, 1938 – October 21, 1995) was an American professional baseball player and coach. He played as a center fielder in Major League Baseball for 18 years (1958–1975), most notably for the Cincinnati Reds, for whom he played from 1958 to 1968 as a four-time National League All-Star. He was inducted into the Cincinnati Reds Hall of Fame in 1977. The 5 ft 11 in (1.80 m), 170 lb (77 kg) Pinson, who batted and threw left-handed, combined power, speed, and strong defensive ability.

== Early life ==
Pinson was born in Memphis, Tennessee, and his family moved to California when he was a child. He attended Oakland's McClymonds High School, a school attended by Baseball Hall of Fame outfielder Frank Robinson (a Pinson teammate in the major leagues for nine years), star centerfielder Curt Flood, and Basketball Hall of Fame center Bill Russell. Pinson had interest in the trumpet in the school's band, to the point where he considered playing trumpet as a career, but his baseball coach George Powles convinced him otherwise, developing him into a player by cultivating his athletic ability and talent.

== Professional career ==
Right before Pinson turned 18, the Cincinnati Redlegs offered him a $4,000 bonus contract, which he signed. He played two seasons in the minor leagues, playing with the Wausau Lumberjacks in the Northern League for 1956 (hitting .278 in 75 games) and the Visalia Redlegs in the California League the following year, hitting .367 with 209 hits in 135 games.

After two minor league seasons and still only 19 years old, he earned a spot on the Redlegs' 25-man roster out of spring training, making his major league debut on April 15, 1958, against the Philadelphia Phillies at home in Crosley Field. Batting second and starting in centerfield, Pinson had one hit in five at-bats, his first hit a single off future Baseball Hall-of-Famer Robin Roberts. Three days later, in the Redlegs' next game, he hit his first home run, a grand slam off Pittsburgh Pirates' starter Ron Kline at Forbes Field. A slump in May that lowered his average to .194 resulted in him being sent to the Seattle Rainiers of the Pacific Coast League. He played in 124 games and hit .343 before being called up by the Redlegs, going .412 in 12 games in September. He finished the year with a .271 batting average in 27 games and 96 at-bats with a .352 OBP.

The next season, 1959, was his first full year in the majors. He responded with big numbers: 154 games, a .316 batting average, a .371 OBP, 131 runs scored (a league high), 205 hits, 47 doubles (also a league high), 20 home runs, and 21 stolen bases. He had an .880 OPS. He was selected to both All-Star Games played that year (not playing in the first while pinch running in the second) and finished 15th in Most Valuable Player voting. He led the National League in putouts as an outfielder with 423.

The following year, he played in 154 games again while having 107 runs on 187 hits, 37 doubles (a league high), 20 home runs, 61 RBIs, and 32 stolen bases on a .287 batting average and .339 OBP while finishing 18th in MVP voting. He had an OPS above 800 once again, having an .811 OPS. He led the league again in putouts with 401. He was named to both of the All-Star Games that year, batting once in the first game and having no at-bat in the second game. However, the Reds went 67-87 and 6th in the National League. This was the worst season in terms of record in Pinson's tenure.

1961 was much of the same in consistent production, playing in all 154 games for the third straight year while having 208 hits (a career high and league high) on 607 at-bats with 101 runs, 34 doubles, 16 home runs and 87 RBIs on a .343 batting average and .379 OBP. He finished 3rd in the MVP voting while receiving a Gold Glove, his only career win. He had a career high .883 OPS. He finished 2nd for the batting title to Roberto Clemente, who edged him out by eight percentage points. For the third year in a row, he led the league in putouts with 391. That year, the Reds won the league pennant, going 93-61 (a 26-game improvement) while gaining the right to play the New York Yankees in the 1961 World Series. Pinson had two hits in 22 at-bats for a .091 batting average as the Reds lost to the Yankees in five games. As it turned out, this was his only postseason appearance in his career.

The following year, he played 155 games (with this being the first season of the National League having 162 games), having 181 hits with 107 runs, 31 doubles, 23 home runs, 100 RBIs, 26 stolen bases on a .292 batting average and a .341 OBP. He had a .817 OPS, his fourth straight year with an OPS above 800. He had 344 putouts as an outfielder, 5th best in the league. However, his season was marred by an embarrassing incident in which he took a swing at club reporter Earl Lawson, who suggested that Pinson would be able to hit for .350 if he went for bunts every so often instead of going for home runs along with questionable fielding. The charges were dropped, but Pinson stated that this was the most embarrassing moment of his career.

For 1963, he played in all 162 games, the only time he would do so in his career. Accordingly, he had 204 hits (a league high), 37 doubles, 14 triples (a league high), 22 home runs, 106 RBIs and 27 stolen bases on a .313 batting average and a .347 OBP. For the fifth (and final) straight year, he had an OPS above 800, slugging a percentage of .861. He had 357 putouts an outfielder, 3rd most in the league. On September 11, 1963, Pinson recorded his 1,000th career hit, doing so on a home run against Claude Raymond of the Milwaukee Braves. He finished 10th in MVP voting.

Robinson noted in his autobiography Extra Innings a story of him and Pinson inviting then rookie Pete Rose to dinner during the season while helping to show him the ropes around the team and league. Pinson allegedly grabbed Lawson by the neck and pushed him against a wall in September 1963, with Lawson filling assault and battery charges, although the trial ended in a hung jury three months later. Lawson also described Pinson as a rare talent like Mickey Mantle that "combined speed with power...Pinson, one of the most graceful runners ever to put on a baseball uniform, gave the appearance of gliding across the ground, his feet barely touching the surface."

Pinson played in 156 games the following year, having 166 hits (his lowest at this point in his career) while having 23 doubles and home runs, 84 RBIs, eight stolen bases and 99 strikeouts (a career high) with a .266 batting average and a .316 OBP. He had 299 putouts as an outfielder, 5th most in the league. He finished 18th in MVP voting. The Reds finished 92-70 that year, one game behind the St. Louis Cardinals and tied with the Philadelphia Phillies, who took both games in the final series of the season. Before his 26th birthday, Pinson had accumulated 1,177 hits, the 5th highest total for a 25-year-old player in MLB history, behind only Ty Cobb (1,433), Mel Ott (1,249), Al Kaline (1,200) and Freddie Lindstrom (1,186), all of whom were inducted into the Baseball Hall of Fame. Additionally, he had accumulated more hits than other 25-year-old players such as Alex Rodriguez, Robin Yount, Hank Aaron, Jimmie Foxx and Orlando Cepeda.

1965 was a huge improvement for Pinson, as he played in 159 games while having 728 plate appearances and 669 at-bats, both career highs. He had 204 hits (2nd in the league) and 97 runs with 34 doubles and 22 home runs with 94 RBIs with a .305 batting average, .352 OBP and a .836 OPS. This was the final year with his teammate Frank Robinson, as Bill DeWitt traded Robinson to the Baltimore Orioles on December 9, 1965.

The following year, he played in 156 games while having 178 hits, 35 doubles, 16 home runs, 76 RBIs, with a .288 batting average, .326 OBP and .768 OPS. Although he was 4th in putouts as an outfielder with 344, he committed 13 errors, 2nd most in the League.

For 1967, he played in 158 games, having 187 hits, 90 runs, 28 doubles, 13 triples (a league high), 18 home runs, 66 RBIs, 26 stolen bases (4th in the League), with a .288 batting average, .318 OBP and a .771 OPS. He had 341 putouts as an outfielder (with 338 as a centerfielder), 2nd most in the League, with a decrease in errors to five.

The following year (described by some as "The Year of the Pitcher") was his final season with the Reds. He played 130 games, his least with the team in a full season, having 60 runs, 135 hits, 29 doubles, six triples, five home runs, 48 RBIs, 17 stolen bases, with a .271 batting average, .311 OBP, and a .694 OPS (his lowest as a Red). His putout total of 271 was also a career low for him in a full season, although he did have a .978 fielding percentage. On May 22, 1968, Pinson collected a double off Dave Giusti of the Houston Astros to pass Edd Roush (who had 1,784 hits with Cincinnati) for most hits as a Red. He retained the record for four seasons until Pete Rose passed him on September 1, 1972. The Reds finished 83-79 that year, with Pinson finishing his Reds career on the final game on September 29, where he went 1-for-2 with a walk. On October 11, he was traded by the Reds to the St. Louis Cardinals for Wayne Granger and Bobby Tolan. Since the trade in 1968, numerous players have worn his jersey number of 28, from Tolan (who Pinson was traded for) to Anthony DeSclafani. In 11 years with the Reds, he had played in 1,565 games, garnering 1,881 hits on 6,335 at-bats while having 342 doubles, 186 home runs, 814 RBIs with 221 stolen bases for a .297 batting average. His numbers for the remaining seven-year career were not as consistent, although he maintained fair production.

=== Later career (1969-1975) ===
In his only year with the Cardinals, he played in 123 games while having 126 hits, 58 runs, 22 doubles, 10 home runs, 70 RBIs on a .255 batting average (his 2nd lowest for his entire career) while having a .303 OBP and .686 OPS. Although he played in just 1,090.2 innings, he had a .996 fielding percentage as an outfielder (with just one error all season), 1st in the league. Pinson recorded his 2,000th hit off Pittsburgh Pirates reliever Joe Gibbon in the bottom of the 7th inning on September 18, 1969.

He moved to the Cleveland Indians for the 1970 season, playing in 148 games while having 164 hits, 74 runs, 28 doubles, a career-high 24 home runs, 82 RBIs on a .286 batting average, .319 OBP and .800 OPS (his highest since 1965). The following year, he played in 146 games, having 149 hits, 60 runs, 23 doubles, 11 home runs and 35 RBIs while stealing 25 bases (5th most in the American League) with a .263 batting average, .295 OBP, and a .672 OPS. He was third in both assists as a center fielder and errors committed, with nine and five respectively. On October 5, he was traded by the Indians (along with Frank Baker and Alan Foster) to the California Angels for Alex Johnson and Jerry Moses.

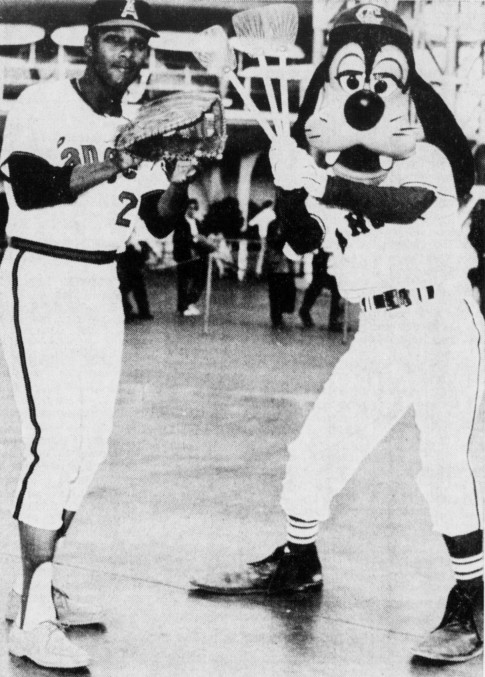
Pinson in 1972

For 1972, he played in 136 games while having 133 hits and 56 runs with 24 doubles, seven home runs, 49 RBIs, 17 stolen bases on a .275 batting average, a .321 OBP, and .697 OPS. In left field, he had 10 assists in his 112 games played at the position, with the former category being 2nd in the League, while turning three double plays, a league high. He regressed slightly the following year, playing in just 124 games while having 121 hits, 56 runs, 14 doubles, eight home runs, 57 RBIs with five stolen bases on a .260 batting average, .286 OBP and a .653 OPS. He appeared in under 1,000 innings on the field (having 997.2), the first time this occurred since his rookie year in 1958. His totals would go down the following two seasons. He was traded by the Angels on February 23, 1974, for Barry Raziano and cash.

In 115 games with the Royals the ensuing season, he had 112 hits, 46 runs, 18 doubles, 41 RBIs, 21 stolen bases for a .276 batting average, .312 OBP, and a .686 OPS. He played most of his games at right field (with occasional games at left or center), logging in 860 combined innings while having a .980 fielding percentage. In his final season in 1975, Pinson played in just 103 games, having 71 hits, 37 runs, 14 doubles, four home runs with 21 RBIs, five stolen bases with a .223 batting average, .248 OBP, and a .583 OPS. He played 629 total innings in the field, a good chunk in right field, while having a .993 fielding percentage, with five games played at DH. In his final game on September 28, 1975, against the Texas Rangers, he replaced Amos Otis in center field and played the position for three innings, having one at-bat against Stan Perzanowski in the 6th, grounding out. On December 15, he was released by the team. He was signed as a free agent by the Milwaukee Brewers but was released by the team on April 4, four days before the season started.

== Career statistics ==
In an 18-year career, playing for the Cincinnati Reds, St. Louis Cardinals, Cleveland Indians, California Angels, and Kansas City Royals, Pinson appeared in 2469 games, compiling a .286 batting average, with 2757 hits, 1365 runs, 485 doubles, 127 triples, 256 home runs, 1169 RBI, 305 stolen bases, 574 walks, .327 on-base percentage and .442 slugging percentage. He had four 200+ hit seasons in 1959, 1961, 1963 and 1965, batting over .300 in each season. He recorded a career .981 fielding percentage and was a gold glove winner in 1961. For all players who played in the third quarter of the 20th century (1950-1975), he was 7th in hits for all players and the only one of the top ten not in the Hall of Fame.

== Coaching career ==
Highly respected throughout the game, he was later a coach for the Seattle Mariners (1977–80; 1982–83), Chicago White Sox (1981), Detroit Tigers (1985–91), and Florida Marlins (1993–94) after his playing days ended. He coached on the inaugural editions of two expansion teams, the Mariners (1977) and the Marlins (1993).

== Personal life ==
He became eligible for the Hall of Fame in 1981. In his 15 years on the ballot, his highest ballot total was 15.7% in 1988. He fell off the ballot in 1996, receiving just 10.9% of votes.

He had three daughters, Valerie, Kimberly and Renee, and one son, Vada Pinson III.

Pinson retired from baseball entirely after the 1994 season. On October 5, 1995, he was admitted to an Oakland hospital after suffering a stroke. He died on October 21, 1995. He was interred at Rolling Hills Memorial Park, Richmond, California.

== See also ==
- List of Major League Baseball career home run leaders
- List of Major League Baseball career hits leaders
- List of Major League Baseball career doubles leaders
- List of Major League Baseball career triples leaders
- List of Major League Baseball career runs scored leaders
- List of Major League Baseball career runs batted in leaders
- List of Major League Baseball career total bases leaders
- List of Major League Baseball annual runs scored leaders
- List of Major League Baseball annual doubles leaders
- List of Major League Baseball annual triples leaders
