= Vern Geishert =

American baseball player (born 1946)

- Pitcher
- Born: January 10, 1946 (age 80); Madison, Wisconsin, U.S.
- Batted: Right Threw: Right

MLB debut
- August 26, 1969, for the California Angels

Last MLB appearance
- October 2, 1969, for the California Angels

MLB statistics
- Win–loss record: 1–1
- Earned run average: 4.65
- Innings: 31
- Stats at Baseball Reference

Teams
- California Angels (1969)

Vernon William Geishert (born January 10, 1946) is an American former professional baseball player. A 6 ft 1 in (1.85 m), 215 lb (98 kg) right-handed pitcher, he appeared in 11 Major League Baseball games for the California Angels in 1969.

Geishert was drafted by the Angels in the second round of the January 1966 Major League Baseball draft out of the University of Wisconsin, Madison. After his fourth minor league campaign, he was recalled in August 1969. In his debut against the Cleveland Indians, he entered the game in relief of starting pitcher Steve Kealey in the third inning. The Angels were leading, 4–2, but the Indians were rallying and the bases were loaded. Geishert got Vern Fuller on a fly ball out, and went on to pitch four full innings of three-hit relief to earn the eventual 8–4 victory in his first MLB game. He appeared in ten more games over the final weeks of the 1969 season, including three starting assignments. He gave up 32 hits and seven bases on balls in 31 total innings pitched with 18 strikeouts. He was credited with one save.

On November 25, 1969, Geshert was included in a major interleague trade, going to the Cincinnati Reds with starting pitcher Jim McGlothlin and reliever Pedro Borbón for hard-hitting outfielder Alex Johnson and infielder Chico Ruiz. On May 29, 1971, Geishert was again involved in a big trade, this time going to the San Francisco Giants along with infielder Frank Duffy for future star George Foster.
