= Lefty Phillips =

American baseball coach and manager (1919–1972)

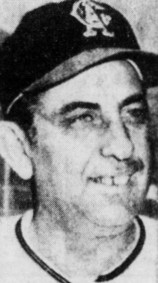
- Manager
- Born: May 16, 1919; Los Angeles, California, U.S.
- Died: June 12, 1972 (aged 53); Fullerton, California, U.S.
- Batted: Left Threw: Left

MLB statistics
- Managerial record: 222–225
- Winning percentage: .497
- Stats at Baseball Reference
- Managerial record at Baseball Reference

Teams
- California Angels (1969–1971)

Career highlights and awards
- World Series champion (1965)

Harold Ross "Lefty" Phillips (May 16, 1919 – June 12, 1972) was an American coach, manager, scout, and front office executive in Major League Baseball. As manager of the California Angels from May 27, 1969, through the 1971 season, Phillips was the second manager in Los Angeles Angels franchise history.

== Early life and career ==
A native of Los Angeles, he attended Franklin High School. He was a left-handed pitcher in his playing days but, because of a sore arm, his professional playing career consisted of fewer than five games with the Bisbee Bees of the Class D Arizona–Texas League in 1939. With his playing days behind him, Phillips worked for a railroad and, still in his early twenties, simultaneously embarked on his scouting career by joining the staff of the St. Louis Browns.

After the Second World War, Phillips returned to baseball and became a highly respected scout for the Cincinnati Reds (1947–50) and the Brooklyn/Los Angeles Dodgers (1952–64). As an area scout in Southern California, he signed Baseball Hall of Fame pitcher Don Drysdale, 1959 World Series MVP Larry Sherry, and 21-year MLB veteran Ron Fairly for the Dodgers, among many others. Phillips also signed future Hall of Fame manager Sparky Anderson to his first playing contract in 1953.

In 1965, Phillips reached the Major Leagues when he was named pitching coach of the Dodgers. During his first two seasons in that post, he worked with Hall of Famers Drysdale, Sandy Koufax and Don Sutton, as Los Angeles won back-to-back National League pennants and the 1965 World Series. Although the Dodgers fell back in the standings in 1967–68, after Koufax' retirement, they still boasted one of the strongest pitching staffs in the majors.

== Manager of 1969–71 Angels ==
At the end of the 1968 season, Phillips joined former Dodger executive Dick Walsh in the Angels' front office. Walsh was appointed general manager, while Phillips was named to the high-ranking post of director of player personnel. But when the Angels started only 11–28 in 1969 under their longtime and original manager, Bill Rigney, Phillips was asked to return to the field, first as a coach, and then as Rigney's replacement on May 27, despite his never before having managed in the minor leagues or in MLB.

The Angels responded to Phillips, however, improving from sixth (last) place to third in the American League West Division in 1969 and then—led by batting champion Alex Johnson—winning 86 games in 1970 to again finish third. Johnson, however, was a disciplinary problem. In 1971 he was suspended by Phillips five times for lack of hustle, culminating in a season-long suspension beginning June 26, and the Angels won only 76 games. Walsh and Phillips were fired at the end of the season, and Johnson was traded. Phillips' record in 21/2 seasons as Angel manager was 222–225 (.497).

Phillips then resumed his scouting career with the Angels, but on June 12, 1972, he was stricken with a fatal asthma attack. He died in Fullerton, California, at age 53, and is buried at the Mount Sinai Memorial Park Cemetery in Los Angeles. Phillips was posthumously elected to the Southern California Jewish Sports Hall of Fame in 2000.

| Preceded by Joe Becker | Los Angeles Dodgers Pitching Coach; 1965–1968 | Succeeded by Red Adams |
