= Marvin Milkes =

- Born: August 10, 1923; Niagara Falls, New York, U.S.
- Died: January 31, 1982 (aged 58); Los Angeles, California, U.S.
- Occupation: Sports executive

Marvin Edward Milkes (August 10, 1923 – January 31, 1982) was an American front office executive in three professional sports: Major League Baseball, soccer, and hockey. He is perhaps best known as the first general manager in the history of baseball's Seattle Pilots and—when that franchise was transferred after its only season in the Pacific Northwest—Milwaukee Brewers.

== Minor league executive ==
A former batboy for the Pacific Coast League's Los Angeles Angels, Milkes' front-office career began in 1946 when he became an executive with minor league affiliates in the St. Louis Cardinals' vast farm system. He won The Sporting News' Minor League Executive of the Year Award (Lower Classification) in 1956 as general manager of the Fresno Cardinals of the Class C California League. Beginning in 1957, he was the GM of the San Antonio Missions, then the Double-A Texas League affiliate of the Baltimore Orioles. When the Orioles dropped the affiliation after the 1958 season, Milkes worked to keep the Missions franchise alive, securing a working agreement with the Chicago Cubs. He later served as general manager of the Charleston Senators of the Triple-A American Association in 1960.

== At the Pilots' helm ==
In 1961, he joined the front office of the American League's Los Angeles Angels in the franchise's first year as an expansion team. Serving as assistant general manager to Fred Haney, Milkes helped build the organization. One of his duties beginning in 1965 was to supervise its newly acquired Triple-A club, the Seattle Angels of the Pacific Coast League, and when Seattle was granted an AL expansion team for 1969—the Pilots—Milkes was named its first general manager in February 1968.

Although he drafted many veterans from the 1968 expansion pool, Milkes also chose younger players who would go on to long and successful Major League careers—including Lou Piniella, Mike Marshall and Marty Pattin. But his most famous acquisition was pitcher Jim Bouton, purchased from the New York Yankees during the 1968 season. Bouton would immortalize the 1969 Pilots in his memoir/diary Ball Four, and Milkes would not escape Bouton's scorn as an example of a baseball executive willing to deceive his players for the benefit of the club's ownership and management.

Bouton wrote on August 26, 1969, after Milkes had traded him to the Houston Astros: "As soon as a general manager says ['Now I want to be honest with you'], check your wallet. It's like Marvin Milkes telling you, 'We've always had a nice relationship.' The truth is general managers aren't honest with their players, and they have no relationship with them except a business one."

== One and done in Seattle ==
Unfortunately for Milkes, the Pilots' tenure in Seattle would be the shortest of any franchise in modern MLB history and Ball Four would be the team's lasting legacy. The Pilots played in a former minor league facility, Sick's Stadium, that was intended only as a stopgap until a domed stadium could be built. The team was outdrafted by its expansion twin, the Kansas City Royals, and finished last in the American League West Division, winning only 64 games and drawing only 678,000 fans. They were also plagued by an unstable, undercapitalized ownership. Dewey Soriano, the man who had won the franchise, couldn't pay the expansion fee and had to get help from former Cleveland Indians owner William R. Daley, who got almost half the stock in return.

By the end of the season, the Pilots had almost run out of money. It was obvious that the Pilots would not be able to hold out long enough to move to their new stadium without new ownership. It was also obvious that those new owners would have to start construction right away, as it was now clear that Sick's Stadium was inadequate even for temporary use. A local group was forced to withdraw when the Bank of California called a $4 million loan to the Soriano-Daley group. Another local group put together a nonprofit bid to buy the team, but this bid was rejected out of concerns it would devalue the other clubs. Another, more traditional bid by the same people fronting the nonprofit group fell one vote short of approval. The American League was concerned enough to seize control of the Pilots and appoint Roy Hamey as caretaker CEO to watch over the foundering franchise.

As the Pilots got ready for spring training in 1970, the only credible buyers who appeared on the horizon were bent on moving the Pilots to Milwaukee. This group, headed by Bud Selig, wanted to bring baseball back to a city still smarting over the 1965 move of the Braves to Atlanta. It had tried to lure the Chicago White Sox to Milwaukee, and failed to land a National League expansion franchise in 1969. MLB gave tentative approval for the sale to Selig's group, but the state of Washington got a temporary injunction to stop the sale. In response, the Pilots filed for bankruptcy to forestall any further legal action.

As spring training drew to a close, Pilots players and management were unsure whether to report to Seattle or Milwaukee to begin the 1970 season. At the bankruptcy hearing, Milkes testified that the Pilots no longer had enough money to pay the coaches, players and office staff. Had Milkes been more than 10 days late in paying the players, they would have all become free agents and left Seattle without a team for the 1970 season. With this in mind, Federal Bankruptcy Referee Sidney C. Volinn declared the Pilots bankrupt on March 31—seven days before Opening Day—clearing the way for them to move to Milwaukee. The team's equipment had been sitting in Provo, Utah with the drivers awaiting word on whether to drive toward Seattle or Milwaukee.

With the move being approved on such short notice, Selig and his syndicate were compelled to retain Milkes and the new manager he had just hired, Dave Bristol. The Brewers took the field with the outline of the old Pilots logo clearly visible on their uniforms, and Milkes was allowed to finish the season—during which Milwaukee won 65 games (one more than the Pilots had won the previous year), finished fourth in the AL West, and attracted 933,000 fans. Then, on December 17, 1970, Milkes turned in his resignation.

== After baseball: hockey and soccer ==
As it turned out, Milkes' resignation signaled the end of a 25-year baseball career. His next job, in February 1972, was as the first general manager in the history of the New York Raiders, a franchise in the upstart World Hockey Association. But Milkes' tenure was brief; he resigned eight months into the job. He returned to the club in the same capacity, replacing his previous successor Jerry DeLise on 20 November 1973 when the franchise relocated to Cherry Hill, New Jersey and was rebranded the Jersey Knights.

In soccer, Milkes was general manager of the Las Vegas Quicksilvers of the North American Soccer League (NASL) in 1976; the team relocated to San Diego after that season. In 1981, Milkes was general manager of Soccer Los Angeles, which operated the Los Angeles Aztecs of the NASL, but the franchise folded and in November of that year he resigned.

Slightly more than two months later, on January 31, 1982, Milkes died of an apparent heart attack at a Los Angeles health club. He was 58 years old.

Preceded by Franchise established	Seattle Pilots/Milwaukee Brewers General Manager; 1968–1970	Succeeded by Frank Lane
