= Frank Baker (outfielder) =

American baseball player (1944–2010)

- Frank Baker, Topps 1971
- Outfielder
- Born: January 11, 1944; Bartow, Florida, U.S.
- Died: January 28, 2010 (aged 66); Raleigh, North Carolina, U.S.
- Batted: Left Threw: Right

MLB debut
- July 27, 1969, for the Cleveland Indians

Last MLB appearance
- September 29, 1971, for the Cleveland Indians

MLB statistics
- Batting average: .232
- Home runs: 4
- Runs batted in: 38
- Stats at Baseball Reference

Teams
- Cleveland Indians (1969, 1971)

Frank Baker Jr. (January 11, 1944 – January 28, 2010) was an American professional baseball player. He was a backup outfielder in Major League Baseball who played for the Cleveland Indians in the 1969 and 1971 seasons. Listed at 5 feet 10 inches (1.78 m), 180 pounds (82 kg), he batted left-handed and threw right-handed.

A native of Bartow, Florida, Baker played high school baseball for Franklin High School in Somerset, New Jersey, where he was inducted into their Football Hall of Fame. He signed with the Cleveland Indians in 1964 and played for them in their Minor league system for three years before joining the United States Army. In the Army, he served in the Vietnam War from 1967 to 1968, and attained the rank of private first class. After discharging from the Army in 1969, he spent most of the season with the Waterbury Indians, hitting .312 in 84 games before being promoted. He made his major league debut on July 27, and got off to a blistering hot start for the Indians, 11 hits in his first 24 at bats for a .458 average.. Cleveland fans started to call him "Home Run Baker" after the famous Philadelphia Phillies Hall of Fame Frank Baker with that nickname from the dead-ball era. Alas, the Indians' Baker cooled off after his brilliant start, and for the season he hit .256 in 52 games for Cleveland. The following season, he spent the year with the Wichita Aeros. In 1971, he divided his playing time between the Indians and the Aeros. He also played for Triple-A California affiliate Salt Lake City Angels in 1972, his last season in baseball.

In part of two season for the Indians, Baker was a .286 hitter (82-for-353) with four home runs and 38 runs batted in in 125 games. In a seven-season minors career, he hit .284 with 51 homers and 235 RBI in 703 games.

Baker died in Raleigh, North Carolina, at the age of 66, following complications from a heart failure. He is buried at Florida National Cemetery, Bushnell, Florida.
