= 1963 Minnesota Twins season =

1963 Minnesota Twins
- League: American League
- Ballpark: Metropolitan Stadium
- City: Bloomington, Minnesota
- Record: 91–70 (.565)
- Divisional place: 3rd
- Owners: Calvin Griffith (majority owner, with Thelma Griffith Haynes)
- General managers: Calvin Griffith
- Managers: Sam Mele
- Television: WTCN-TV
- Radio: 830 WCCO AM (Ray Scott, Herb Carneal, Halsey Hall)

The 1963 Minnesota Twins season was the 3rd season for the Minnesota Twins franchise in the Twin Cities of Minnesota, their 3rd season at Metropolitan Stadium and the 63rd overall in the American League.

The Twins finished 91–70, third in the American League. 1,406,652 fans attended Twins games, the highest total in the American League.

== Offseason ==
- November 5, 1962: Rudy May was signed as an amateur free agent by the Twins.
- November 26, 1962: Rich Reese was drafted by the Twins from the Detroit Tigers in the 1962 first-year draft.
- November 26, 1962: Joe Foy was drafted by the Boston Red Sox from the Minnesota Twins in the 1962 minor league draft.
- January 21, 1963: Rubén Gómez was released by the Twins.

== Regular season ==
Four Twins made the All-Star Game: first baseman Harmon Killebrew, shortstop Zoilo Versalles, outfielder Bob Allison and catcher Earl Battey.

On August 29, the Twins played two games at Washington. The club struck eight home runs in the first game (to tie an American League record) and four more in the nightcap, for an even dozen on the day.

On September 21, the Twins played two games at Boston's Fenway Park. Slugger Harmon Killebrew connected for three home runs in the first game and another in the nightcap. His four-homer double-header tied an AL record.

Harmon Killebrew again led the team (and the American League) with 45 home runs; his 96 RBI was Minnesota's best. Bob Allison hit 35 home runs and drove in 91. Camilo Pascual won 21 games and led the AL with 202 strikeouts.

With 33 home runs, Twins rookie Jimmie Hall topped the Boston Red Sox Ted Williams' "true rookie" American League record of 31 homers, set by Williams in 1939. The team's total of 225 home runs was the second-most ever in a season at the time, only trailing the 1961 New York Yankees' 240.

Three Twins won Gold Gloves: first baseman Vic Power won his sixth, shortstop Zoilo Versalles won his first, and Jim Kaat won his second.

=== Season standings ===
American League
Team	W	L	Pct.	GB	Home	Road
New York Yankees	104	57	.646	—	58‍–‍22	46‍–‍35
Chicago White Sox	94	68	.580	10½	49‍–‍33	45‍–‍35
Minnesota Twins	91	70	.565	13	48‍–‍33	43‍–‍37
Baltimore Orioles	86	76	.531	18½	48‍–‍33	38‍–‍43
Cleveland Indians	79	83	.488	25½	41‍–‍40	38‍–‍43
Detroit Tigers	79	83	.488	25½	47‍–‍34	32‍–‍49
Boston Red Sox	76	85	.472	28	44‍–‍36	32‍–‍49
Kansas City Athletics	73	89	.451	31½	36‍–‍45	37‍–‍44
Los Angeles Angels	70	91	.435	34	39‍–‍42	31‍–‍49
Washington Senators	56	106	.346	48½	31‍–‍49	25‍–‍57

=== Record vs. opponents ===
1963 American League record Sources:
Team	BAL	BOS	CWS	CLE	DET	KCA	LAA	MIN	NYY	WAS
Baltimore	—	7–11	7–11	10–8	13–5	9–9	9–9	9–9	7–11	15–3
Boston	11–7	—	8–10	10–8	9–9	7–11	9–8	7–11	6–12	9–9
Chicago	11–7	10–8	—	11–7	11–7	12–6	10–8	8–10	8–10	13–5
Cleveland	8–10	8–10	7–11	—	10–8	11–7	10–8	5–13	7–11	13–5
Detroit	5–13	9–9	7–11	8–10	—	13–5	12–6	8–10	8–10	9–9
Kansas City	9–9	11–7	6–12	7–11	5–13	—	10–8	9–9	6–12	10–8
Los Angeles	9–9	8–9	8–10	8–10	6–12	8–10	—	9–9	5–13	9–9
Minnesota	9–9	11–7	10–8	13–5	10–8	9–9	9–9	—	6–11	14–4
New York	11–7	12–6	10–8	11–7	10–8	12–6	13–5	11–6	—	14–4
Washington	3–15	9–9	5–13	5–13	9–9	8–10	9–9	4–14	4–14	—

=== Notable transactions ===
- May 21, 1963: Bill Tuttle was released by the Twins.
- August 24, 1963: Dwight Siebler was purchased by the Twins from the Philadelphia Phillies.

=== Roster ===
1963 Minnesota Twins
Roster
Pitchers: 35 Gerry Arrigo; 31,15 Bill Dailey; 27 Gary Dotter; 27 Mike Fornieles; 36 Jim Kaat; 15 Jack Kralick; 29,33 Fred Lasher; 21 Ray Moore; 17 Camilo Pascual; 31 Jim Perry; 19 Bill Pleis; 32 Garry Roggenburk; 34 Jim Roland; 34 Dwight Siebler; 39,20 Lee Stange; 18 Dick Stigman; 20 Frank Sullivan; 43 Don Williams	Catchers: 10 Earl Battey; 24 Paul Ratliff; 22 Jerry Zimmerman; Infielders: 12,1 Bernie Allen; 11 George Banks; 8 Johnny Goryl; 5 Don Mincher; 28 Vic Power; 9 Rich Rollins; 2 Zoilo Versalles; 26 Jay Ward; 6 Vic Wertz	Outfielders: 4 Bob Allison; 7 Lenny Green; 30 Jimmie Hall; 3 Harmon Killebrew; 23 Jim Lemon; 29 Wally Post; 13 Bill Tuttle; Other batters: 40 Julio Bécquer; 37 Tony Oliva	Manager: 14 Sam Mele; Coaches: 53 Floyd Baker; 52 Ed Fitz Gerald; 54 Gordon Maltzberger; 51 Hal Naragon

== Player stats ==
= Indicates team leader

=== Batting ===
==== Starters by position ====
Note: Pos = Position; G = Games played; AB = At bats; H = Hits; Avg. = Batting average; HR = Home runs; RBI = Runs batted in

Pos	Player	G	AB	H	Avg.	HR	RBI
C	Earl Battey	147	508	145	.285	26	84
1B	Vic Power	138	541	146	.270	10	52
2B	Bernie Allen	139	421	101	.240	9	43
3B	Rich Rollins	136	531	163	.307	16	61
SS	Zoilo Versalles	159	621	162	.261	10	54
LF	Harmon Killebrew	142	515	133	.258	45	96
CF	Jimmie Hall	156	497	129	.260	33	80
RF	Bob Allison	148	527	143	.271	35	91

==== Other batters ====
Note: G = Games played; AB = At bats; H = Hits; Avg. = Batting average; HR = Home runs; RBI = Runs batted in

Player	G	AB	H	Avg.	HR	RBI
Lenny Green	145	280	67	.239	4	27
Don Mincher	82	225	58	.258	17	42
Johnny Goryl	64	150	43	.287	9	24
George Banks	25	71	11	.155	3	8
Jerry Zimmerman	39	56	13	.232	0	3
Wally Post	21	47	9	.191	2	6
Vic Wertz	35	44	6	.136	3	7
Paul Ratliff	10	21	4	.190	1	3
Jim Lemon	7	17	2	.118	0	1
Jay Ward	9	15	1	.067	0	2
Tony Oliva	7	7	3	.429	0	1
Bill Tuttle	4	3	0	.000	0	0
Julio Bécquer	1	0	0	----	0	0

=== Pitching ===
==== Starting pitchers ====
Note: G = Games pitched; IP = Innings pitched; W = Wins; L = Losses; ERA = Earned run average; SO = Strikeouts

Player	G	IP	W	L	ERA	SO
Camilo Pascual	31	248.1	21	9	2.46	202
Dick Stigman	33	241.0	15	15	3.25	193
Jim Kaat	31	178.1	10	10	4.19	105
Jim Perry	35	168.1	9	9	3.74	65
Lee Stange	32	164.2	12	5	2.62	100
Jack Kralick	5	25.2	1	4	3.86	13

==== Other pitchers ====
Note: G = Games pitched; IP = Innings pitched; W = Wins; L = Losses; ERA = Earned run average; SO = Strikeouts

Player	G	IP	W	L	ERA	SO
Jim Roland	10	49.0	4	1	2.57	34
Dwight Siebler	7	38.2	2	1	2.79	22
Gerry Arrigo	5	15.2	1	2	2.87	13

==== Relief pitchers ====
Note: G = Games pitched; W = Wins; L = Losses; SV = Saves; ERA = Earned run average; SO = Strikeouts

Player	G	W	L	SV	ERA	SO
Bill Dailey	66	6	3	21	1.99	72
Bill Pleis	36	6	2	0	4.37	37
Garry Roggenburk	36	2	4	4	2.16	24
Ray Moore	31	1	3	2	6.98	38
Mike Fornieles	11	1	1	0	4.76	7
Fred Lasher	11	0	0	0	4.76	10
Frank Sullivan	10	0	1	1	5.73	2
Don Williams	3	0	0	0	10.38	2
Gary Dotter	2	0	0	0	0.00	2

== Farm system ==
Level	Team	League	Manager
AAA	Dallas-Fort Worth Rangers	Pacific Coast League	Jack McKeon
AA	Charlotte Hornets	Sally League	Al Evans
A	Wilson Tobs	Carolina League	Ralph Rowe
A	Orlando Twins	Florida State League	Harry Warner
A	Erie Sailors	New York–Penn League	Frank Franchi
A	Bismarck-Mandan Pards	Northern League	Vern Morgan
Rookie	Wytheville Twins	Appalachian League	Red Norwood

LEAGUE CHAMPIONS: Wilson
