= 1961 Minnesota Twins season =

1961 Minnesota Twins
- League: American League
- Ballpark: Metropolitan Stadium
- City: Bloomington, Minnesota
- Record: 70-90 (.438)
- League place: 7th
- Owners: Calvin Griffith (majority owner, with Thelma Griffith Haynes)
- General managers: Calvin Griffith
- Managers: Cookie Lavagetto, Sam Mele
- Television: WTCN-TV
- Radio: 830 WCCO AM (Bob Wolff, Ray Scott, Halsey Hall)

The 1961 Minnesota Twins season was the 61st in franchise history and its first in Minneapolis–Saint Paul after it transferred from Washington following a six-decade tenure in late October 1960. The maiden edition of the Twins finished 1961 with a record of 70–90, good for seventh place in the American League, which had expanded from eight to ten teams during the 1960–61 offseason. The Twins played their home games at Metropolitan Stadium, where they set a franchise record for home attendance.

== Offseason ==
After 60 seasons in Washington, the Senators franchise moved to the Minneapolis–Saint Paul area – or, more precisely, Bloomington, Minnesota – in 1961. In honor of the cities' nickname, "The Twin Cities", the franchise changed the team's name to the Twins. As one of the conditions to allow the team to move, there would be a new Senators franchise in Washington in 1961, an expansion team that joined the league along with the Los Angeles Angels.

== Opening Day ==
The Twins won their first-ever game, when Pedro Ramos shut out the New York Yankees in Yankee Stadium on April 11. In beating the defending American League champs 6–0, Ramos out-dueled New York ace Whitey Ford, allowing just three hits and a walk. Ramos drove in two runs with a single himself. Bob Allison hit the first home run in Minnesota big-league history with a solo shot off Ford in the seventh inning, and Reno Bertoia followed with another homer, a two-run blast, an inning later off Ralph Terry. On April 21, the Twins lost their home opener to the expansion team that replaced them in the nation's capital, the second edition of the Senators, 5–3, before 24,606 at Metropolitan Stadium.

=== Starting lineup, April 11, 1961 ===
2	Zoilo Versalles	SS
7	Lenny Green	CF
3	Harmon Killebrew	1B
23	Jim Lemon	LF
4	Bob Allison	RF
10	Earl Battey	C
1	Reno Bertoia	3B
9	Billy Gardner	2B
14	Pedro Ramos	P

== Regular season ==
The move to Minnesota immediately paid dividends at the turnstiles, where they drew 1,256,723 fans, the third highest total in the American League. The previous year in Washington, the Senators drew just 743,404 fans, worst in the league. However, the team's record went in the other direction, as they dropped from 73–81 and fifth place in 1960 to 70–90 and seventh place under the new 162-game AL schedule.

In early June, after a losing streak that reached eleven games, Twins owner Calvin Griffith directed manager Cookie Lavagetto to take a week-long sabbatical. Two weeks after his return, Lavagetto was fired by Griffith. Cookie had been managing the club since the 1957 season. He was replaced by his first base coach Sam Mele.

In a home Fourth of July double-header against Chicago, the Twins' Julio Bécquer hit a pinch hit grand slam home run that was the first of its kind in major league history—each run was credited to a different Chicago pitcher (Billy Pierce, Russ Kemmerer, Frank Baumann and Warren Hacker). In the second game, Twins slugger Harmon Killebrew hit an inside-the-park home run—the only one he would hit in his 573-homer career.

Two Twins made the All-Star Game: first baseman Harmon Killebrew (both games) and pitcher Camilo Pascual (second game).

On August 20, pitchers Jack Kralick and Al Schroll each hit a home run against the Los Angeles Angels—the sixth and final pitching duo to do so in the same game. On September 27, Schroll took a no-hitter into the ninth inning before giving up four runs on two walks and two hits.

Pedro Ramos was the first pitcher to lead the American League in losses for four years in a row. Both Harmon Killebrew and Bob Allison topped 100 in RBIs, walks and strikeouts.

Harmon Killebrew led the team with 46 home runs, 122 runs batted in, and 94 runs scored. Camilo Pascual led the Twins with 15 wins and a 3.46 ERA. Catcher Earl Battey won his second Gold Glove Award.

=== Season standings ===
American League
Team	W	L	Pct.	GB	Home	Road
New York Yankees	109	53	.673	—	65‍–‍16	44‍–‍37
Detroit Tigers	101	61	.623	8	50‍–‍31	51‍–‍30
Baltimore Orioles	95	67	.586	14	48‍–‍33	47‍–‍34
Chicago White Sox	86	76	.531	23	53‍–‍28	33‍–‍48
Cleveland Indians	78	83	.484	30½	40‍–‍41	38‍–‍42
Boston Red Sox	76	86	.469	33	50‍–‍31	26‍–‍55
Minnesota Twins	70	90	.438	38	36‍–‍44	34‍–‍46
Los Angeles Angels	70	91	.435	38½	46‍–‍36	24‍–‍55
Kansas City Athletics	61	100	.379	47½	33‍–‍47	28‍–‍53
Washington Senators	61	100	.379	47½	33‍–‍46	28‍–‍54

=== Record vs. opponents ===
1961 American League record Sources:
Team	BAL	BOS	CWS	CLE	DET	KCA	LAA	MIN	NYY	WAS
Baltimore	—	11–7	11–7	9–9	9–9	13–5	8–10	11–7	9–9–1	14–4
Boston	7–11	—	9–9	5–13	8–10	10–8	11–7–1	11–7	5–13	10–8
Chicago	7–11	9–9	—	12–6	6–12	14–4	10–8	9–9–1	6–12	13–5
Cleveland	9–9	13–5	6–12	—	6–12	8–9	10–8	10–8	4–14	12–6
Detroit	9–9	10–8	12–6	12–6	—	12–6–1	14–4	11–7	8–10	13–5
Kansas City	5–13	8–10	4–14	9–8	6–12–1	—	9–9	7–11	4–14	9–9
Los Angeles	10–8	7–11–1	8–10	8–10	4–14	9–9	—	8–9	6–12	10–8
Minnesota	7–11	7–11	9–9–1	8–10	7–11	11–7	9–8	—	4–14	8–9
New York	9–9–1	13–5	12–6	14–4	10–8	14–4	12–6	14–4	—	11–7
Washington	4–14	8–10	5–13	6–12	5–13	9–9	8–10	9–8	7–11	—

=== Notable transactions ===
- December 14, 1960: Faye Throneberry was drafted from the Twins by the Los Angeles Angels in the 1960 MLB expansion draft.
- Prior to 1961 season: Jackie Collum was acquired by the Twins from the Los Angeles Dodgers.
- June 1, 1961: Billy Consolo was traded by the Twins to the Milwaukee Braves for Billy Martin.
- June 1, 1961: Reno Bertoia, Paul Giel and a player to be named later were traded by the Twins to the Kansas City Athletics for Bill Tuttle and a player to be named later. The Athletics completed the deal by returning Paul Giel to the Twins in exchange for cash on June 10.

=== Roster ===
1961 Minnesota Twins
Roster
Pitchers: 42 Gerry Arrigo; 38 Fred Bruckbauer; 16 Bert Cueto; 41 Gary Dotter; 18 Paul Giel; 36 Jim Kaat; 15 Jack Kralick; 20 Don Lee; 18 Danny McDevitt; 21 Ray Moore; 24,40 Ed Palmquist; 17 Camilo Pascual; 40 Bill Pleis; 14,28 Pedro Ramos; 35 Ted Sadowski; 43 Al Schroll; 39 Lee Stange; 27 Chuck Stobbs	Catchers: 10 Earl Battey; 11 Ron Henry; 8 Hal Naragon; Infielders: 29 Julio Bécquer; 1 Reno Bertoia; 6 Billy Consolo; 9 Billy Gardner; 3 Harmon Killebrew; 6 Ted Lepcio; 1 Billy Martin; 28 Don Mincher; 9 Rich Rollins; 6 Jim Snyder; 13 Bill Tuttle; 5 José Valdivielso; 2 Zoilo Versalles	Outfielders: 4 Bob Allison; 35 Joe Altobelli; 22 Dan Dobbek; 7 Lenny Green; 25 Jake Jacobs; 23 Jim Lemon; 32 Elmer Valo; 24 Pete Whisenant	Manager: 51 Cookie Lavagetto; 32,14 Sam Mele; Coaches: 53 Floyd Baker; 52 Eddie Lopat; 55 Clyde McCullough; 54 Sam Mele

== Player stats ==
= Indicates team leader

=== Batting ===
==== Starters by position ====
Note: Pos = Position; G = Games played; AB = At bats; H = Hits; Avg. = Batting average; HR = Home runs; RBI = Runs batted in

Pos	Player	G	AB	H	Avg.	HR	RBI
C	Earl Battey	133	460	139	.302	17	55
1B	Harmon Killebrew	150	541	156	.288	46	122
2B	Billy Martin	108	374	92	.246	6	36
SS	Zoilo Versalles	129	510	143	.280	7	53
3B	Bill Tuttle	113	370	91	.246	5	38
LF	Jim Lemon	129	423	109	.258	14	52
CF	Lenny Green	156	600	171	.285	9	50
RF	Bob Allison	159	556	136	.245	29	105

==== Other batters ====
Note: G = Games played; AB = At bats; H = Hits; Avg. = Batting average; HR = Home runs; RBI = Runs batted in

Player	G	AB	H	Avg.	HR	RBI
Billy Gardner	45	154	36	.234	1	11
José Valdivielso	76	149	29	.195	1	9
Hal Naragon	57	139	42	.302	2	11
Dan Dobbek	72	125	21	.168	4	14
Ted Lepcio	47	112	19	.170	7	19
Reno Bertoia	39	104	22	.212	1	8
Don Mincher	35	101	19	.188	5	11
Joe Altobelli	41	95	21	.221	3	14
Julio Bécquer	57	84	20	.238	5	18
Elmer Valo	33	32	5	.156	0	4
Ron Henry	20	28	4	.143	0	3
Rich Rollins	13	17	5	.294	0	3
Jake Jacobs	4	8	2	.250	0	0
Pete Whisenant	10	6	0	.000	0	0
Billy Consolo	11	5	0	.000	0	0
Jim Snyder	3	5	0	.000	0	0

=== Pitching ===
= Indicates league leader

==== Starting pitchers ====
Note: G = Games pitched; IP = Innings pitched; W = Wins; L = Losses; ERA = Earned run average; SO = Strikeouts

Player	G	IP	W	L	ERA	SO
Pedro Ramos	42	264.1	11	20	3.95	174
Camilo Pascual	35	252.1	15	16	3.46	221
Jack Kralick	33	242.0	13	11	3.61	137
Jim Kaat	36	200.2	9	17	3.90	122
Bert Cueto	7	21.1	1	3	7.17	5

==== Other pitchers ====
Note: G = Games pitched; IP = Innings pitched; W = Wins; L = Losses; ERA = Earned run average; SO = Strikeouts

Player	G	IP	W	L	ERA	SO
Don Lee	37	115.0	3	6	3.52	65
Al Schroll	11	50.0	4	4	5.22	24
Bert Cueto	7	21.1	1	3	7.17	5
Ed Palmquist	9	21.0	1	1	9.43	13
Gerry Arrigo	7	9.2	0	1	10.24	6

==== Relief pitchers ====
Note: G = Games pitched; W = Wins; L = Losses; SV = Saves; ERA = Earned run average; SO = Strikeouts

Player	G	W	L	SV	ERA	SO
Ray Moore	46	4	4	14	3.67	45
Bill Pleis	37	4	2	2	4.95	32
Chuck Stobbs	24	2	3	2	7.46	17
Ted Sadowski	15	0	2	0	6.82	12
Paul Giel	12	1	0	0	9.78	14
Lee Stange	7	1	0	0	2.92	10
Gary Dotter	2	0	0	0	9.00	2
Julio Bécquer	1	0	0	0	20.25	0
Fred Bruckbauer	1	0	0	0	inf	0

== Farm system ==
Level	Team	League	Manager
AAA	Syracuse Chiefs	International League	Gene Verble and Frank Verdi
AA	Nashville Vols	Southern Association	Spencer "Red" Robbins
A	Charlotte Hornets	Sally League	Ellis Clary
B	Wilson Tobs	Carolina League	Jack McKeon
D	Fort Walton Beach Jets	Alabama–Florida League	Vern Morgan
D	Wytheville Twins	Appalachian League	Red Norwood
D	Erie Sailors	New York–Penn League	Harry Warner

LEAGUE CHAMPIONS: Wilson
