= Pleis =

Pleis is a surname. Notable people with the surname include:

- Bill Pleis (born 1937), American baseball player
- Jack Pleis (1917–1990), American jazz pianist, arranger, conductor, composer and producer
