= 1963 Major League Baseball season =

1963 MLB season
- League: American League (AL); National League (NL)
- Sport: Baseball
- Duration: Regular season: April 8 – September 29, 1963; World Series: October 2–6, 1963
- Games: 162
- Teams: 20 (10 per league)
- TV partner(s): NBC, CBS

Regular season
- Season MVP: AL: Elston Howard (NYY); NL: Sandy Koufax (LAD)
- AL champions: New York Yankees
- AL runners-up: Chicago White Sox
- NL champions: Los Angeles Dodgers
- NL runners-up: St. Louis Cardinals

World Series
- Champions: Los Angeles Dodgers
- Runners-up: New York Yankees
- World Series MVP: Sandy Koufax (LAD)

MLB seasons
- ← 1962 1964 →

Locations of teams for the 1962–1964 American League seasons
American League
Locations of teams for the 1962–1963 National League seasons
National League

The 1963 major league baseball season began on April 8, 1963. The regular season ended on September 29, with the Los Angeles Dodgers and New York Yankees as the regular season champions of the National League and American League, respectively. The postseason began with Game 1 of the 60th World Series on October 2 and ended with Game 4 on October 6. In the eighth iteration of this World Series matchup, and their first since the Dodgers relocated to Los Angeles from Brooklyn, New York, the Dodgers swept the Yankees in four games, capturing their third championship in franchise history, since their previous in 1959, and second in Los Angeles. The Dodgers' stellar pitching staff, anchored by left-hander Sandy Koufax and right-hander Don Drysdale, was so dominant that the vaunted Yankees, despite the presence of sluggers such as Mickey Mantle and Roger Maris in their lineup, never took a lead against Los Angeles the entire Series. This was the eighth World Series between the two teams. Going into the season, the defending World Series champions were the New York Yankees from the 1962 season.

In a return to the single-game-in-a-season format, the 34th All-Star Game, was held on July 9 at Cleveland Stadium in Cleveland, Ohio, home of the Cleveland Indians. The National League won, 5–3.

== Schedule ==
The 1963 schedule consisted of 162 games for all teams in the American League and National League, each of which had 10 teams. Each team was scheduled to play 18 games against the other nine teams of their respective league. This continued the format put in place by the American League since the 1961 season and by the National League since the previous season, and would be used until 1969.

Opening Day took place on April 8, featuring four teams. The final day of the regular season was on September 29, which saw 16 teams play. The World Series took place between October 2 and October 6.

== Rule changes ==
The 1963 season saw the following rule changes:

- The top of the strike zone was raised from the armpits to the top of the shoulders.
- Caught stealing, a statistic that began being tracked in 1951, was officially codified.
- In efforts to speed up the game:
  - Both the American and National Leagues implement a five-pitch warm-up limit per inning, reducing the number from eight.
    - The American League, however, still allows eight pitches for the first 30 days of the season.
  - Both leagues implement a rule forcing pitchers to be in the on-deck circle as the next batter in the lineup. Previously, the following batter would stand in the on-deck circle while the pitcher rested on the bench until his at-bat.
    - The American League additionally required catchers in the on-deck circle to remove all protective gear.
  - The National League now limits the ability of managers to visit the mound to once per inning. The pitcher would be removed from the game if the manager visited a second time.
- If offensive interference is called, all runners must return to their last legally touched base.

== Teams ==
League	Team	City	Ballpark	Capacity	Manager
American League	Baltimore Orioles	Baltimore, Maryland	Baltimore Memorial Stadium	49,373	Billy Hitchcock
American League	Boston Red Sox	Boston, Massachusetts	Fenway Park	33,357	Johnny Pesky
American League	Chicago White Sox	Chicago, Illinois	White Sox Park	46,550	Al López
American League	Cleveland Indians	Cleveland, Ohio	Cleveland Stadium	73,811	Birdie Tebbetts
American League	Detroit Tigers	Detroit, Michigan	Tiger Stadium	53,089	Bob Scheffing
American League	Detroit Tigers	Detroit, Michigan	Tiger Stadium	53,089	Chuck Dressen
American League	Kansas City Athletics	Kansas City, Missouri	Municipal Stadium	34,165	Ed Lopat
American League	Los Angeles Angels	Los Angeles, California	Dodger Stadium (Note: Dodger Stadium was referred to as "Chavez Ravine Stadium" by the Angels during their tenure.)	56,000	Bill Rigney
American League	Minnesota Twins	Bloomington, Minnesota	Metropolitan Stadium	40,073	Sam Mele
American League	New York Yankees	New York, New York	Yankee Stadium	67,337	Ralph Houk
American League	Washington Senators	Washington, D.C.	District of Columbia Stadium	43,500	Mickey Vernon
American League	Washington Senators	Washington, D.C.	District of Columbia Stadium	43,500	Eddie Yost
American League	Washington Senators	Washington, D.C.	District of Columbia Stadium	43,500	Gil Hodges
National League	Chicago Cubs	Chicago, Illinois	Wrigley Field	36,755	Bob Kennedy
National League	Cincinnati Reds	Cincinnati, Ohio	Crosley Field	30,322	Fred Hutchinson
National League	Houston Colt .45s	Houston, Texas	Colt Stadium	32,601	Harry Craft
National League	Los Angeles Dodgers	Los Angeles, California	Dodger Stadium	56,000	Walter Alston
National League	Milwaukee Braves	Milwaukee, Wisconsin	Milwaukee County Stadium	43,768	Bobby Bragan
National League	New York Mets	New York, New York	Polo Grounds	56,000	Casey Stengel
National League	Philadelphia Phillies	Philadelphia, Pennsylvania	Connie Mack Stadium	33,608	Gene Mauch
National League	Pittsburgh Pirates	Pittsburgh, Pennsylvania	Forbes Field	35,500	Danny Murtaugh
National League	San Francisco Giants	San Francisco, California	Candlestick Park	42,553	Alvin Dark
National League	St. Louis Cardinals	St. Louis, Missouri	Busch Stadium	30,500	Johnny Keane

== Standings ==
=== American League ===
American League
Team	W	L	Pct.	GB	Home	Road
New York Yankees	104	57	.646	—	58‍–‍22	46‍–‍35
Chicago White Sox	94	68	.580	10½	49‍–‍33	45‍–‍35
Minnesota Twins	91	70	.565	13	48‍–‍33	43‍–‍37
Baltimore Orioles	86	76	.531	18½	48‍–‍33	38‍–‍43
Cleveland Indians	79	83	.488	25½	41‍–‍40	38‍–‍43
Detroit Tigers	79	83	.488	25½	47‍–‍34	32‍–‍49
Boston Red Sox	76	85	.472	28	44‍–‍36	32‍–‍49
Kansas City Athletics	73	89	.451	31½	36‍–‍45	37‍–‍44
Los Angeles Angels	70	91	.435	34	39‍–‍42	31‍–‍49
Washington Senators	56	106	.346	48½	31‍–‍49	25‍–‍57

=== National League ===
National League
Team	W	L	Pct.	GB	Home	Road
Los Angeles Dodgers	99	63	.611	—	50‍–‍31	49‍–‍32
St. Louis Cardinals	93	69	.574	6	53‍–‍28	40‍–‍41
San Francisco Giants	88	74	.543	11	50‍–‍31	38‍–‍43
Philadelphia Phillies	87	75	.537	12	45‍–‍36	42‍–‍39
Cincinnati Reds	86	76	.531	13	46‍–‍35	40‍–‍41
Milwaukee Braves	84	78	.519	15	45‍–‍36	39‍–‍42
Chicago Cubs	82	80	.506	17	43‍–‍38	39‍–‍42
Pittsburgh Pirates	74	88	.457	25	42‍–‍39	32‍–‍49
Houston Colt .45s	66	96	.407	33	44‍–‍37	22‍–‍59
New York Mets	51	111	.315	48	34‍–‍47	17‍–‍64

=== Tie game ===
1 tie game (0 in AL, 1 in NL), which is not factored into winning percentage or games behind (and was replayed again) occurred during the season.

==== National League ====
- May 29, Milwaukee Braves vs. Los Angeles Dodgers, tied at 3 after a shortened seven innings on account of fog.

== Postseason ==
The postseason began on October 2 and ended on October 6 with the Los Angeles Dodgers sweeping the New York Yankees in the 1963 World Series in four games.

=== Bracket ===
World Series
AL	New York Yankees	0
NL	Los Angeles Dodgers	4

== Managerial changes ==
=== Off-season ===
Team	Former Manager	New Manager
Boston Red Sox	Pinky Higgins	Johnny Pesky
Chicago Cubs	College of Coaches	Bob Kennedy
Cleveland Indians	Mel Harder	Birdie Tebbetts
Kansas City Athletics	Hank Bauer	Ed Lopat
Milwaukee Braves	Birdie Tebbetts	Bobby Bragan

=== In-season ===
Team	Former Manager	New Manager
Detroit Tigers	Bob Scheffing	Chuck Dressen
Washington Senators	Mickey Vernon	Eddie Yost
Washington Senators	Eddie Yost	Gil Hodges

== League leaders ==
=== American League ===
Hitting leaders
Stat	Player	Total
AVG	Carl Yastrzemski (BOS)	.321
OPS	Bob Allison (MIN)	.911
HR	Harmon Killebrew (MIN)	45
RBI	Dick Stuart (BOS)	118
R	Bob Allison (MIN)	99
H	Carl Yastrzemski (BOS)	183
SB	Luis Aparicio (BAL)	40

Pitching leaders
Stat	Player	Total
W	Whitey Ford (NYY)	24
L	Orlando Peña (KCA)	20
ERA	Gary Peters (CWS)	2.33
K	Camilo Pascual (MIN)	202
IP	Whitey Ford (NYY)	269.1
SV	Stu Miller (BAL)	27
WHIP	Ralph Terry (NYY)	1.063

=== National League ===
Hitting leaders
Stat	Player	Total
AVG	Tommy Davis (LAD)	.326
OPS	Hank Aaron (MIL)	.977
HR	Hank Aaron (MIL); Willie McCovey (SF)	44
RBI	Hank Aaron (MIL)	130
R	Hank Aaron (MIL)	121
H	Vada Pinson (CIN)	204
SB	Maury Wills (LAD)	40

Pitching leaders
Stat	Player	Total
W	Sandy Koufax^{1} (LAD); Juan Marichal (SF)	25
L	Roger Craig (NYM)	22
ERA	Sandy Koufax^{1} (LAD)	1.88
K	Sandy Koufax^{1} (LAD)	306
IP	Juan Marichal (SF)	321.1
SV	Lindy McDaniel (CHC)	22
WHIP	Sandy Koufax (LAD)	0.875

^{1} National League Triple Crown pitching winner

== Milestones ==
=== Batters ===
==== Cycles ====
- Johnny Callison (PHI):
  - Callison hit for his first cycle and sixth in franchise history, on June 27 against the Pittsburgh Pirates.
- Jim Hickman (NYM):
  - Hickman hit for his first cycle, first in franchise history, and seventh natural cycle in major league history on August 7 against the St. Louis Cardinals.

==== Other batting accomplishments ====
- Eddie Mathews (MIL):
  - Became the eighth player in Major League history to hit 400 home runs in the seventh inning against the Philadelphia Phillies on April 16.
- Duke Snider (NYM):
  - Became the ninth player in Major League history to hit 400 home runs in the first inning against the Cincinnati Reds on June 14.
- Woodie Held / Pedro Ramos / Tito Francona / Larry Brown (CLE):
  - Became the second group of players to hit four consecutive home runs in the 6th inning in game one of a doubleheader on July 31 against the Los Angeles Angels.
- Willie Mays (SF):
  - Became the 10th player in Major League history to hit 400 home runs in the third inning against the St. Louis Cardinals on August 27.
- Stan Musial (STL):
  - Became the second player in major league history to play in 3,000 games on August 31 against the Philadelphia Phillies.
  - Set a National League record for most career hits with his 3,630th hit in on September 29 against the Cincinnati Reds.
- Jesús Alou / Matty Alou / Felipe Alou (SF):
  - Became the first brother trio to bat consecutively in one game on September 10.

=== Pitchers ===
==== No-hitters ====
- Sandy Koufax (LAD):
  - Koufax threw for his second career no-hitter and 15th no-hitter in franchise history, by defeating the San Francisco Giants 8–0 on May 11. Koufax walked two and struck out four, throwing 72 strikes on 111 pitches.
- Don Nottebart (HOU):
  - Nottebart threw for his first career no-hitter and first in franchise history, by defeating the Philadelphia Phillies 4–1 on May 17. Nottebart walked three and struck out eight, throwing 67 strikes on 105 pitches.
- Juan Marichal (SF):
  - Marichal threw for his first career no-hitter and ninth in franchise history, by defeating the Houston Colt .45s 1–0 on June 15. Marichal walked two and struck out five.

==== Other pitching accomplishments ====
- Bob Shaw (MIL):
  - Set a Major League record for most balks in a game by a single player when he balked five times on May 4.
- Milwaukee Braves:
  - Set a Major League record at six balks for most balks in a game by a single team when Bob Shaw balked five times and Denny Lemaster balked once on May 4.
- Early Wynn (CLE):
  - Became the 14th member of the 300-win club, defeating the Kansas City Athletics on game two of a doubleheader on July 13, winning 7–4.
- Warren Spahn (MIL):
  - Breaks a National League record for most starts previously set by Grover Cleveland Alexander, when he starts his 601st game on August 23.
  - Became the oldest pitcher to win 20 games in a season on September 8 against the Philadelphia Phillies, at age 42.

=== Miscellaneous ===
- Ernie Banks (CHC):
  - Set a National League record by recording 22 putouts in a 3–1 victory over the Pittsburgh Pirates on May 9.

== Season recap ==
In the American League, the New York Yankees were in the 4th of 5 straight pennant winning years, and, led by MVP Elston Howard, cruised to the American League title by 10.5 games over the 2nd place Chicago White Sox.

In the National League, most experts figured the San Francisco Giants and Los Angeles Dodgers would be locked in another battle for the pennant, much like 1962 when the Giants came from behind and beat the Dodgers in a playoff. The Dodgers started slowly, perhaps feeling the hangover effect from blowing the pennant the year before. They were 2 games under .500 in early May, and trailed the surprising St. Louis Cardinals by 4.5 games. Then their pitching asserted itself, and on August 28, the Dodgers led the Giants by 5.5 games and the Cardinals by 6.5 games. The Cardinals proceeded to win 19 of their next 20 games and, while the Dodgers didn't exactly slump, they went "only" 14–7 during that same period. Thus, the Dodgers went into St. Louis on September 16 to play the Cardinals in a 3-game series leading by only 1 game. With the memory of blowing the 1962 pennant fresh in their minds, the Dodgers proceeded to sweep the Cardinals and take a 4-game lead with 7 games to go. The key game was the third one; the Cardinals led 5–1 in the 8th inning and a win would move them back to within 2 games of L.A. But the Dodgers got 3 in the 8th and in the top of the 9th, late season call up Dick Nen, in only his 8th major league at bat, hit a pinch hit homer to force extra innings. The Cardinals got a leadoff triple from Dick Groat in the 10th but could not score. The Dodgers then scored an unearned run in the 13th inning and won, 6–5. The disheartened Cardinals then lost their next 3 games as well while the Dodgers won 3 of their next 4 to clinch the pennant with 6 games left.

== Awards and honors ==
Hall of Famer Sandy Koufax

=== Regular season ===
Baseball Writers' Association of America Awards
BBWAA Award	National League	American League
Rookie of the Year	Pete Rose (CIN)	Gary Peters (CWS)
Cy Young Award	Sandy Koufax (LAD)	—
Most Valuable Player	Sandy Koufax (LAD)	Elston Howard (NYY)
Babe Ruth Award (World Series MVP)	Sandy Koufax (LAD)	—
Gold Glove Awards
Position	National League	American League
Pitcher	Bobby Shantz (STL)	Jim Kaat (MIN)
Catcher	Johnny Edwards (CIN)	Elston Howard (NYY)
1st Base	Bill White (STL)	Vic Power (MIN)
2nd Base	Bill Mazeroski (PIT)	Bobby Richardson (NYY)
3rd Base	Ken Boyer (STL)	Brooks Robinson (BAL)
Shortstop	Bobby Wine (PHI)	Zoilo Versalles (MIN)
Outfield	Roberto Clemente (PIT)	Jim Landis (CWS)
Outfield	Curt Flood (STL)	Al Kaline (DET)
Outfield	Willie Mays (SF)	Carl Yastrzemski (BOS)

=== Other awards ===
- Sport Magazine's World Series Most Valuable Player Award: Sandy Koufax (LAD)

The Sporting News Awards
Award	National League	American League
Player of the Year	Sandy Koufax (LAD)	—
Pitcher of the Year	Sandy Koufax (LAD)	Whitey Ford (NYY)
Fireman of the Year (Relief pitcher)	Lindy McDaniel (CHC)	Stu Miller (BAL)
Rookie Player of the Year	Pete Rose (CIN)	Pete Ward (CWS)
Rookie Pitcher of the Year	Ray Culp (PHI)	Gary Peters (CGW)
Manager of the Year	Walter Alston (LAD)	—
Executive of the Year	Bing Devine (STL)	—

=== Monthly awards ===
==== Player of the Month ====
Month	National League
May	Dick Ellsworth (CHC)
June	Ron Santo (CHC)
July	Willie McCovey (SF)
August	Willie Mays (SF)

=== Baseball Hall of Fame ===
- John Clarkson
- Elmer Flick
- Sam Rice
- Eppa Rixey

== Home field attendance ==
Team name	Wins	%±	Home attendance	%±	Per game
Los Angeles Dodgers	99	−2.9%	2,538,602	−7.9%	31,341
San Francisco Giants	88	−14.6%	1,571,306	−1.3%	19,399
Minnesota Twins	91	0.0%	1,406,652	−1.8%	17,366
New York Yankees	104	8.3%	1,308,920	−12.4%	16,362
St. Louis Cardinals	93	10.7%	1,170,546	22.7%	14,451
Chicago White Sox	94	10.6%	1,158,848	2.4%	14,132
New York Mets	51	27.5%	1,080,108	17.1%	13,335
Chicago Cubs	82	39.0%	979,551	60.6%	12,093
Boston Red Sox	76	0.0%	942,642	28.6%	11,783
Philadelphia Phillies	87	7.4%	907,141	19.0%	11,199
Cincinnati Reds	86	−12.2%	858,805	−12.6%	10,603
Detroit Tigers	79	−7.1%	821,952	−32.0%	10,148
Los Angeles Angels	70	−18.6%	821,015	−28.2%	10,136
Pittsburgh Pirates	74	−20.4%	783,648	−28.1%	9,675
Baltimore Orioles	86	11.7%	774,343	−2.0%	9,560
Milwaukee Braves	84	−2.3%	773,018	0.8%	9,427
Kansas City Athletics	73	1.4%	762,364	19.9%	9,412
Houston Colt .45s	66	3.1%	719,502	−22.2%	8,883
Cleveland Indians	79	−1.3%	562,507	−21.4%	6,945
Washington Senators	56	−6.7%	535,604	−26.6%	6,695

== Uniforms ==
In an attempt to create an identity distinguishable from all other teams, Kansas City Athletics owner Charlie Finley changed the team uniforms to kelly green and yellow. This tradition of "green and gold" has been preserved to this day, although the kelly green has since been replaced with forest green. Finley also changed the Athletics' cleats to white instead of the standard black. Coaches and managers were also given white hats, which were dropped when the Athletics adopted new colors in 1993. The white cleats were dropped in 2000, but were revived in 2008.

== Venues ==
The New York Mets would play their final game at the Polo Grounds on September 18 against the Philadelphia Phillies, moving into Shea Stadium for the start of the 1964 season. This would be the final of 78 seasons since 1882 that any iteration of the Polo Grounds featured a major-league team.

== Media ==
=== Television ===
CBS and NBC aired weekend Game of the Week broadcasts. The All-Star Game and World Series also aired on NBC.

== Retired numbers ==
- Stan Musial had his No. 6 retired by the St. Louis Cardinals on September 29. This was the first number retired by the team.

== See also ==
- 1963 in baseball (Events, Births, Deaths)
- 1963 Nippon Professional Baseball season
