= Dwight Siebler =

American baseball player (1937–2021)

- Pitcher
- Born: August 5, 1937; Platte Center, Nebraska, U.S.
- Died: June 16, 2021 (aged 83); Omaha, Nebraska, U.S.
- Batted: Right Threw: Right

MLB debut
- August 26, 1963, for the Minnesota Twins

Last MLB appearance
- April 30, 1967, for the Minnesota Twins

MLB statistics
- Win–loss record: 4–3
- Earned run average: 3.45
- Strikeouts: 71
- Stats at Baseball Reference

Teams
- Minnesota Twins (1963–1967)

Dwight Leroy Siebler (August 5, 1937 – June 16, 2021) was an American professional baseball player. A right-handed pitcher who attended the University of Nebraska, he spent one full season (1966) and parts of four others in Major League Baseball for the Minnesota Twins. Siebler stood 6 feet 2 inches (1.88 m) tall and weighed 184 pounds (83 kg).

Siebler began his pro career with the Philadelphia Phillies and was in his fifth season with the Phils' minor league organization when his contract was purchased by the Twins in late August 1963. He made five starts in seven appearances for Minnesota during the remainder of the season and turned in two complete game victories, defeating the Washington Senators 10–1 on three hits August 29 and the Detroit Tigers 3–1 on four hits September 17. He made only three more starts during his Major League career.

Siebler spent parts of the 1964 and 1965 seasons in Triple-A. During 1966, his full season with Minnesota, Siebler worked in 23 games, with two starts, and recorded his two other big-league victories and his one MLB save. On August 17, against the California Angels, he earned his final Major League win with 6 2/3 innings of relief, allowing one unearned run, and enabling the Twins to come from behind to win, 5–3.

Siebler appeared in 48 Major League games pitched. In 117 1/3 innings, he allowed only 97 hits, with 71 strikeouts and 44 bases on balls. He left professional baseball after the 1967 season.

Siebler died in Omaha, Nebraska, in June 2021 at the age of 83.
