= Gary Dotter =

American baseball player (1942–2024)

- Pitcher
- Born: August 7, 1942; St. Louis, Missouri, U.S.
- Died: July 27, 2024 (aged 81); Wichita Falls, Texas, U.S.
- Batted: Left Threw: Left

MLB debut
- September 10, 1961, for the Minnesota Twins

Last MLB appearance
- October 2, 1964, for the Minnesota Twins

MLB statistics
- Win–loss record: 0–0
- Earned run average: 5.11
- Innings pitched: 12⅓
- Stats at Baseball Reference

Teams
- Minnesota Twins (1961, 1963–1964)

Gary Richard Dotter (August 7, 1942 – July 27, 2024) was an American professional baseball player. A left-handed pitcher listed at 6 feet 1 inch (1.85 m) tall and 180 pounds (82 kg), he made late-season appearances in three seasons (1961; 1963–1964) for the Minnesota Twins of Major League Baseball.

Dotter signed with his hometown St. Louis Cardinals after high school, but was drafted out of the Redbird farm system after his first minor league season in Class D, then the lowest classification of the minors. After posting 14 wins with the 1961 Wilson Tobs of the Class B Carolina League, he was recalled by the Twins that September. He made his debut by pitching four innings in relief against the Kansas City Athletics. He did a creditable job for his first three innings — giving up only one earned run — but in his fourth frame, he surrendered five runs and was replaced on the mound by a non-pitcher, first baseman Julio Bécquer.

Dotter would appear in six other MLB games for Minnesota in relief over his career, and pitch well. He worked in a total of seven Major League games and 12 ⅓ innings pitched, surrendering nine hits seven earned runs, walking seven and striking out ten.

But he spent the remainder of his professional career in the minor leagues, retiring after the 1967 campaign with a 55–40 won–lost record.

Dotter died from complications of Parkinson's disease on July 27, 2024, at the age of 81.
