= Fred Bruckbauer =

American baseball player (1938-2007)

- Pitcher
- Born: May 27, 1938; New Ulm, Minnesota, U.S.
- Died: October 14, 2007 (aged 69); Naples, Florida, U.S.
- Batted: Right Threw: Right

MLB debut
- April 25, 1961, for the Minnesota Twins

Last MLB appearance
- April 25, 1961, for the Minnesota Twins

MLB statistics
- Win–loss record: 0–0
- Earned run average: infinite
- Strikeouts: 0
- Stats at Baseball Reference

Teams
- Minnesota Twins (1961)

Frederick John Bruckbauer (May 27, 1938 – October 14, 2007) was an American relief pitcher in Major League Baseball. Listed at 6 feet 1 inch (1.85 m) and 185 pounds (84 kg), Bruckbauer batted and threw right-handed. He was born in New Ulm, Minnesota.

Bruckbauer was one of the better pitchers in Minnesota Golden Gophers history before making one appearance for the Minnesota Twins during the 1961 season.

In two years with the Gophers, Bruckbauer posted a 16–5 record and received one of the bigger signing bonuses of its time, estimated at $50,000 ($552,226 today), from the original Washington Senators in 1959. That year, he was named Outstanding Rookie of the Three-I League while pitching for the Fox Cities Foxes under Jack McKeon. He had a chance to play in the majors when the Senators moved to Minnesota in 1961, but a shoulder injury had robbed much of his promise. His Major League career, statistically speaking, was only slightly different than that of Eddie Gaedel or Moonlight Graham.

On April 25, 1961, Bruckbauer appeared in a game against the Kansas City Athletics at Municipal Stadium. He faced four batters, allowing three runs on three hits and one walk without recording an out. Coming into the game in the fourth inning in relief of Lee Stange with the Twins already trailing 7–2, Bruckbauer allowed a double to Dick Howser, an RBI single to Jay Hankins, a walk to Jerry Lumpe, and a two-run double to Lou Klimchock. Bruckbauer then departed and his successor, Chuck Stobbs, temporarily stemmed the tide. Kansas City eventually won the contest, 20–2.

When rosters were reduced from 28 to 25 players, he was sent back to the minors and never appeared in another Major League game, making him one of only 19 pitchers in MLB history with a career earned-run average of infinity. Oddly, two of those 19 are from the same small town of New Ulm, Minnesota: Bruckbauer and Doc Hamann. Hamann was the first ever major league player from New Ulm (playing his one game in 1922); Bruckbauer was the second.

Two players (Vic Davalillo and Gerardo Parra) have retired with infinite ERAs since Bruckbauer's 1961 appearance. However, both were position players who appeared in over 1400 games each, and who were only very briefly used as pitchers as an emergency resort in blowout games. Bruckbauer remains the last person listed as a pitcher on a major league team's roster to retire with a career ERA of infinity.

Following his baseball career, Bruckbauer worked for Deere & Company for 34 years. He died in Naples, Florida, at the age of 69.

== See also ==
- Cup of coffee
