= Sam Mele =

American baseball player and manager (1922–2017)

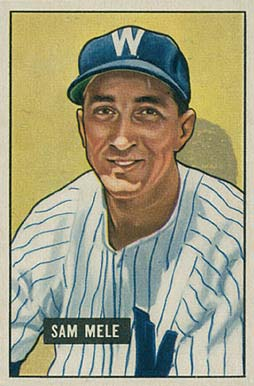
- Right fielder / Manager
- Born: January 21, 1922; Astoria, New York, U.S.
- Died: May 1, 2017 (aged 95); Quincy, Massachusetts, U.S.
- Batted: Right Threw: Right

MLB debut
- April 15, 1947, for the Boston Red Sox

Last MLB appearance
- September 16, 1956, for the Cleveland Indians

MLB statistics
- Batting average: .267
- Home runs: 80
- Runs batted in: 544
- Managerial record: 524–436
- Winning %: .546
- Stats at Baseball Reference
- Managerial record at Baseball Reference

Teams
- As player: Boston Red Sox (1947–1949); Washington Senators (1949–1952); Chicago White Sox (1952–1953); Baltimore Orioles (1954); Boston Red Sox (1954–1955); Cincinnati Redlegs (1955); Cleveland Indians (1956); As manager: Minnesota Twins (1961–1967)

Sabath Anthony "Sam" Mele (/ˈmiːliː/ MEE-lee; January 21, 1922 – May 1, 2017) was an American right fielder, manager, coach and scout in Major League Baseball. As a manager, he led the Minnesota Twins to their first American League championship in 1965.

== Early life ==
Mele was born in 1922 in Queens, New York, where his parents had immigrated to from Italy. Mele was the nephew of major league baseball players Tony and Al Cuccinello, but did not play baseball until he attended William Cullen Bryant High School. The high school gave up baseball after his freshman year, but Mele played with other local baseball teams. Mentored by his uncle Tony, Mele gained major league attention and worked out with several teams while still in high school.

After high school, Mele attended New York University. In 1940, he broke his leg sliding into third base but, in 1941, he posted a batting average of .405, and in 1942, he hit .369. He also excelled as a basketball player. NYU basketball head coach Howard Cann called Mele one of the finest players he ever coached. In the summer of 1941, Mele also played baseball for the Burlington, Vermont team of the Northern League where he made contact with the Boston Red Sox and signed a five-figure contract.

== World War II service ==
But before he could join the Sox, he first signed up for the United States Marine Corps in 1942 and was called in July 1943. As part of the V-12 Navy College Training Program, Mele played baseball for Red Rolfe at Yale University. He was sent to the Pacific Ocean where he was able to play baseball with Joe DiMaggio and others. Mele led the Navy league with a .358 average in 1944.

== Playing career ==
Mele threw and batted right-handed and was listed as 6 feet 1 inch (1.85 m) tall and 183 pounds (83 kg). In 1946, after the Marines, Mele joined the Red Sox in Sarasota, Florida, before being sent to the Louisville Colonels and, later, the Eastern League Scranton Red Sox. Mele won the Eastern League Most Valuable Player award, leading the league in batting average (.342), total bases and triples. Along the way, he acquired the nickname "Sam" from his initials.

The following year, the 1947 Red Sox, the defending American League champions, went into spring training with uncertainty at the right field position, but Mele won the job with a 5-for-5 performance, started in 90 games, and hit .302 for the season. He also substituted well in center field when Dom DiMaggio was injured.

During his big-league career (1947–56), Mele saw duty with six major league clubs: the Red Sox, Washington Senators, Chicago White Sox, Baltimore Orioles, Cincinnati Reds and Cleveland Indians, batting .267 with 80 home runs in 1,046 games. His 916 hits also included 168 doubles, 39 triples, 406 runs and 311 bases on balls. Although he never duplicated his .302 rookie batting average, Mele had two strong back-to-back seasons for Washington in 1950–51. Playing as the Senators' regular right fielder, he drove home 86 and 94 runs and led the American League in doubles with 36 in 1951. In 1953, he knocked in 82 runs for the White Sox, second on the club. Defensively, Mele posted a .988 fielding percentage at all three outfield positions and at first base.

== Managing career ==
=== Minnesota Twins ===
==== Early managerial and coaching career ====
Immediately after his playing career ended in the minor leagues in 1958, Mele became a scout for the Washington Senators. But in 1959, on July 4, Mele joined the Major League coaching staff of the Senators under manager Cookie Lavagetto when Billy Jurges departed to become skipper of the Red Sox. He followed the franchise when it moved to Bloomington, Minnesota, as the Minnesota Twins in 1961. With the maiden edition of the Twins struggling at 19–30 (.388) on June 6, 1961, Mele filled in as manager, winning two of seven games while Lavagetto took a leave of absence. Mele then formally succeeded to the job on June 23, 1961. The Twins moved up two places in the standings under Mele, going 45–49 (.479) and finishing seventh.

But fortified by young players such as Hall of Famer Harmon Killebrew, Jim Kaat, Zoilo Versalles and Bob Allison, the Twins challenged the powerful New York Yankees in 1962 before placing second. After finishing third in 1963, the team suffered through a poor season in 1964, leading to speculation that Mele would be replaced by his new third base coach, Billy Martin.

==== 1965 American League championship ====
1965 proved a surprise as Mele's Twins broke through the Yankees' stranglehold. That team had won the American League pennant 15 of the past 18 seasons (1947–1964) while the Twins languished out of contention. Led by Versalles, who was named the American League's Most Valuable Player, batting champion Tony Oliva, and pitcher Mudcat Grant, who won 21 games, Minnesota won 102 games—still a franchise record—and coasted to the league title (the Yankees, in the beginning of a downfall for years, were not competitive). Minnesota won the first two games in the 1965 World Series, but the superior pitching trio of the Los Angeles Dodgers in Sandy Koufax, Don Drysdale and Claude Osteen asserted itself as Los Angeles won in seven games.

==== 1966 and beyond ====
The 1966 Twins won 13 fewer games, and finished runners-up to the Baltimore Orioles. Mele also became embroiled in a clash between two of his coaches, Martin and pitching tutor Johnny Sain, which was later described by Martin as Sain's efforts to try to get Mele fired. His action (or inaction) alienated him from some of the players. The club swung a major trade for pitcher Dean Chance during the offseason and unveiled star rookie Rod Carew in 1967. Expectations were high in Minnesota, but when the Twins were only .500 after 50 games, Mele was fired. His successor was not Martin, as had been anticipated, but longtime minor league manager Cal Ermer.

Mele's record as a manager was 524–436 (.546). He never managed again at any level in baseball, but returned to the Red Sox, where he served as a special assignments scout from the midseason of 1967 until his 1994 retirement.

=== Managerial record ===
Team	From	To	Regular season record			Post–season record		
Team	From	To	W	L	Win %	W	L	Win %
Minnesota Twins	1961	1961	2	5	.286	—		
Minnesota Twins	1961	1967	522	431	.548	3	4	.429
Total			524	436	.546	3	4	.429
Ref.:

== Death ==
Mele died on the night of May 1, 2017, at his residence in Quincy, Massachusetts, of natural causes at the age of 95.

== See also ==
- List of Major League Baseball annual doubles leaders

Sporting positions
Preceded by Billy Jurges	Washington Senators/Minnesota Twins third base coach 1959–1961	Succeeded by Floyd Baker
