= Bert Cueto =

Cuban baseball player (1937-2011)

- Pitcher
- Born: August 14, 1937; San Luis, Pinar del Río, Cuba
- Died: October 25, 2011 (aged 74); Charlotte, North Carolina, U.S.
- Batted: Right Threw: Right

MLB debut
- June 18, 1961, for the Minnesota Twins

Last MLB appearance
- July 26, 1961, for the Minnesota Twins

MLB statistics
- Win–loss record: 1–3
- Earned run average: 7.17
- Strikeouts: 5
- Stats at Baseball Reference

Teams
- Minnesota Twins (1961)

Dagoberto Cueto Concepción (August 14, 1937 – October 25, 2011) was a Cuban-born professional baseball player. The native of San Luis, Pinar del Río, was a right-handed pitcher whose nine-year career included seven games pitched in Major League Baseball for the 1961 Minnesota Twins. He was listed as a lanky 6 feet 4 inches (1.93 m) tall and 170 pounds (77 kg).

Cueto was signed in 1956 by legendary scout Joe Cambria of the Washington Senators of 1901–1960, and was in his sixth year with the organization when he was recalled from Triple-A Syracuse during the MLB franchise's first season as the Twins. He was a starting pitcher in five of his seven Minnesota appearances, including his MLB debut on June 18, 1961, against the Chicago White Sox at Comiskey Park. Although his day began badly when he allowed two singles, a base on balls, a stolen base and a run to the first three hitters he faced, Cueto settled down and pitched into the ninth inning with a 3–1 lead. But, one out away from his first big-league victory, Cueto surrendered a game-tying home run to pinch hitter Billy Goodman and was removed from the contest. Relief pitcher Pedro Ramos then gave up a game-winning homer to eventual Baseball Hall of Famer Nellie Fox. Cueto would gain his first and only MLB win in his last game with the Twins on July 26, working a scoreless one-third of an inning against the expansion Senators of 1961–1971 and halting a five-run Washington rally to preserve Minnesota's eventual 10–9 win.

Cueto posted an MLB won–lost mark of 1–3 during his Twins' career. In 211/3 total MLB innings pitched, he permitted 27 hits and ten bases on balls, and struck out five. His earned run average was a disappointing 7.17.

He died in Charlotte, North Carolina, one of his minor-league stops, at the age of 74 in 2011.
