= Ron Henry (baseball) =

American baseball player (1936–2016)

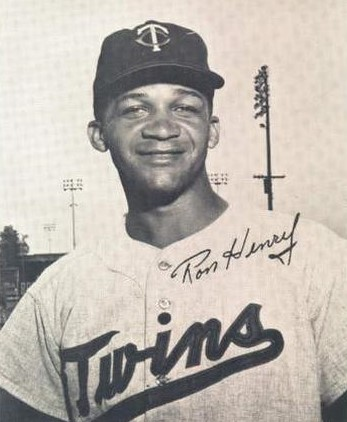
- Catcher
- Born: August 7, 1936; Chester, Pennsylvania, U.S.
- Died: May 14, 2016 (aged 79); Denver, Colorado, U.S.
- Batted: Right Threw: Right

MLB debut
- April 15, 1961, for the Minnesota Twins

Last MLB appearance
- October 2, 1964, for the Minnesota Twins

MLB statistics
- Batting average: .130
- Home runs: 2
- Runs batted in: 8
- Stats at Baseball Reference

Teams
- Minnesota Twins (1961; 1964)

Ronald Baxter Henry (August 7, 1936 – May 14, 2016) was an American professional baseball player. He was a catcher who spent one full season (1961) and part of another (1964) in Major League Baseball as a member of the Minnesota Twins. Born in Chester, Pennsylvania, he threw and batted right-handed, stood 6 feet 1 inch (1.85 m) tall, and weighed 180 pounds (82 kg).

Henry's career lasted for 15 seasons (1954–68). The first seven were spent in the farm system of the Milwaukee Braves. He was chosen in the 1960 Rule 5 draft after batting .310 for the Austin Senators of the Double-A Texas League, and spent the entire 1961 campaign with the Twins in their first season in the Twin Cities. He was the club's third-string catcher (behind Earl Battey and Hal Naragon) and played in only 20 games, 14 as a pinch hitter. Henry batted only .143 with four hits, then spent the next 2 1/2 seasons in the minor leagues until his recall to Minnesota in June 1964. With Battey, a five-time American League All-Star, still entrenched as the Twins' regular receiver, Henry's opportunities again were limited. He appeared in 22 games, 13 as a catcher, and logged 41 at bats. He hit his only two Major League home runs, off Don Lee and Dave Vineyard, but made only three other hits.

Altogether, Henry appeared in 42 MLB games, with nine hits in 69 at bats. He resumed his minor league playing career in 1965.

Henry died on May 14, 2016, aged 79, in Denver, Colorado, of cardiovascular disease and end stage renal disease.
