= Gerry Arrigo =

American baseball player (born 1941)

- Pitcher
- Born: June 12, 1941 (age 85); Chicago, Illinois, U.S.
- Batted: Left Threw: Left

MLB debut
- June 12, 1961, for the Minnesota Twins

Last MLB appearance
- June 5, 1970, for the Chicago White Sox

MLB statistics
- Win–loss record: 35–40
- Earned run average: 4.14
- Strikeouts: 433
- Stats at Baseball Reference

Teams
- Minnesota Twins (1961–1964); Cincinnati Reds (1965–1966); New York Mets (1966); Cincinnati Reds (1967–1969); Chicago White Sox (1970)

Gerald William Arrigo (/əˈriːɡoʊ/ ə-REE-goh; born June 12, 1941) is an American former professional baseball pitcher who appeared in 194 games in Major League Baseball (MLB) for the Minnesota Twins, Cincinnati Reds, New York Mets and Chicago White Sox between 1961 and 1970. Arrigo was a left-hander who was listed as 6 feet 1 inch (1.85 m) tall and weighed 185 pounds (84 kg). He was a graduate of Harrison Technical High School in his native city of Chicago.

His pro career began in 1960 in the White Sox organization. But after only one season in the Class D Midwest League, he was selected by the Twins in the first-year player draft then in effect. His first major league game occurred on June 12, 1961, when he started against the Boston Red Sox at Fenway Park. After hurling a scoreless first inning, he allowed three earned runs on three hits, a walk, and a hit batsman in the second inning. He was charged with the Twins' eventual 10–8 loss. He worked in seven games for the 1961 Twins, then six total MLB games in 1962 and 1963, which he spent primarily in minor league baseball.

Arrigo threw two one-hit games in his career. On June 26, 1964, he had a no hitter going against the White Sox until Mike Hershberger hit a single to center in the top of the ninth inning. His second one-hitter, which came on April 29, 1967, lacked the suspense of the first, as Arrigo gave up the only hit of the game to the New York Mets' Jerry Grote in the first inning.

He had his best all-around year in 1968 for the Reds, in his second tour of duty with the franchise. Appearing in 36 games (31 as starting pitcher) and 2051/3 innings pitched, his record was 12–10 with a 3.33 earned run average with 140 strikeouts and five complete games.

Arrigo went on to play his final major league game with the White Sox, his original organization, on June 5, 1970. In 194 MLB games, with 80 starts, he compiled a 35–40 (4.14) record, with nine complete games, three shutouts and four saves. In 620 innings pitched, he allowed 605 hits and 291 bases on balls, striking out 433. He retired from pro ball in 1971.
