= Don Williams (1963 pitcher) =

American baseball player (1935-1991)

- Pitcher
- Born: September 2, 1935; Los Angeles, California, U.S.
- Died: December 20, 1991 (aged 56); La Jolla, California, U.S.
- Batted: Right Threw: Right

MLB debut
- August 4, 1963, for the Minnesota Twins

Last MLB appearance
- August 17, 1963, for the Minnesota Twins

MLB statistics
- Win–loss record: 0–0
- Earned run average: 10.38
- Innings pitched: 4 1/3
- Stats at Baseball Reference

Teams
- Minnesota Twins (1963)

Donald Reid Williams (September 2, 1935 – December 20, 1991), nicknamed "Dino", was an American professional baseball player. He was a 6 ft 5 in (1.96 m), 218 lb (99 kg) right-handed pitcher who had a three-game, two-week trial in Major League Baseball for the 1963 Minnesota Twins.

Born in Los Angeles, Williams began his 11-year professional career in 1955. Eight years later, after a successful half-season with the Triple-A Dallas-Fort Worth Rangers, he was summoned by the Twins. He made his MLB debut on August 4, 1963, against the Kansas City Athletics, in whose farm system Williams had previously toiled. In that game, he pitched 1 1/3 innings of scoreless relief, although he did allow an inherited runner to score and loaded the bases in his final inning. His other two outings, on August 13 against the Baltimore Orioles and August 17 against the Washington Senators, were less successful. Williams returned to the minor leagues and remained there through the 1966 season.

In 4 1/3 Major League innings pitched, Williams gave up eight hits (including a home run to Washington's Dick Phillips), five earned runs, and six bases on balls.
