= Bob Allison =

American baseball player (1934–1995)

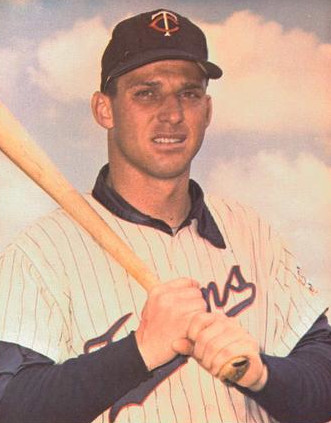
- Allison in 1965
- Outfielder
- Born: July 11, 1934; Raytown, Missouri, U.S.
- Died: April 9, 1995 (aged 60); Rio Verde, Arizona, U.S.
- Batted: Right Threw: Right

MLB debut
- September 16, 1958, for the Washington Senators

Last MLB appearance
- September 29, 1970, for the Minnesota Twins

MLB statistics
- Batting average: .255
- Home runs: 256
- Runs batted in: 796
- Stats at Baseball Reference

Teams
- Washington Senators / Minnesota Twins (1958–1970)

Career highlights and awards
- 3× All-Star (1959², 1963, 1964); AL Rookie of the Year (1959); Minnesota Twins Hall of Fame

William Robert Allison (July 11, 1934 – April 9, 1995) was an American professional baseball outfielder who played 13 seasons in Major League Baseball (MLB), with the Washington Senators / Minnesota Twins.

Allison attended the University of Kansas for two years and was a star outfielder on the baseball team and fullback on the football team. In his Major League career, he hit 30 or more home runs three times and 20 or more in eight different seasons. Although he struck out often like many sluggers, reaching the century mark in strikeouts in five seasons, he received more than his share of walks and despite a mediocre career .255 batting average, Allison finished with a lifetime on-base percentage (OBP) of .358 and he finished in the top 10 in OBP in four seasons. Allison wasn't an especially fast player, but he was among the most feared base-runners of his time in hustling out numerous doubles and triples – leading the league in triples in 1959 (with 9) and finishing in the top 10 twice in doubles (1960 & 1964) and four times in triples (1959, 1962, 1967, and 1968).

At the three outfield positions he showed good range, finishing in the top five in range factor per nine innings five times, and his strong arm was rated as one of the best in the league. He also played a solid first base late at his career and his competitive attitude was highly praised by teammates and opponents. Despite his skill in the field, which saw him finish in the top 5 in the American League in outfield assists three times (1961, 1962, and 1965) and outfield putouts twice (1959 and 1963), he also produced many errors and Allison led the league with 11 errors in 1960, finished second twice (1959 and 1963), and finished fourth in errors by a first baseman in 1964.

== Early life ==
Allison was born on July 11, 1934 in Raytown, Missouri to Robert and Frances (Witte) Allison, the oldest of three children. His father was a former semi-pro baseball catcher. He attended Raytown High School where he starred in football at quarterback and fullback, as well as in basketball and track. The school did not have a baseball team, and he played baseball in the Ban Johnson League, in the Kansas City, Missouri area.

After graduating in 1952, he entered the University of Kansas on a football scholarship, and played baseball as well under coach Floyd Temple. He continued to play baseball in the Ban Johnson League in the summers from 1952 to 1954. He was scouted by a number of major league baseball teams, and in the fall of 1954 when he lost his eligibility to play sports because of his grades, decided to leave Kansas for professional baseball.

== Baseball career ==
After leaving the University of Kansas at the age of 20, Allison was signed by the Senators as an amateur free agent before the start of the 1955 season. After signing, he was assigned to the Hagerstown Packets of the Class B Piedmont League where he hit only .256 in 122 games. The following year, he was promoted to the Charlotte Hornets in the Single-A South Atlantic League. His roommate was Harmon Killebrew, future Senators and Twins teammate and a lifelong friend.

Although he improved his power numbers, hitting 12 home runs and 6 triples, his batting average dipped to .233. Allison then spent 1957 and 1958 playing for the Chattanooga Lookouts of the Double-A Southern League and raised his batting average and slugging percentage to .307 and .446 respectively in 1958 (both highs in his minor league career). On September 16, 1958, Allison made his major league debut, batting lead-off, and got a single in four at bats in a 5–1 loss to the Cleveland Indians.

In 1959, Allison went north with the Senators and he batted .261 with 30 home runs and 85 runs batted in; leading the league in triples (9), while fifth in stolen bases (13). He was named to the All-Star team, received a smattering of Most Valuable Player (MVP) votes, and was honored by being voted Rookie of the Year. Allison experienced a "sophomore slump" in 1960 with an across-the-board drop in his offensive statistics. However, he came back strong in 1961, hitting 29 home runs – including three grand slams – with 105 RBIs, although his batting average dropped for the second year in a row, to .245.

The Senators moved to Minnesota in 1961. Allison hit the first home run in Twins history off future hall of fame Yankees pitcher Whitey Ford. On April 16, 1961 in Baltimore, he hit the first grand slam home run in Twins history, as well as a three-run home run in the same game. Allison became a local favorite and along with teammate Harmon Killebrew made one of the most dangerous one-two punches in baseball. In 1961, they combined for 75 home runs, 80 in 1963, and 81 in 1964. In a July 18, 1962 game against the Cleveland Indians, they each hit a grand slam home run in the first inning. They were known as "Mr. Upstairs" (Killebrew) and "Mr. Downstairs" (Allison).

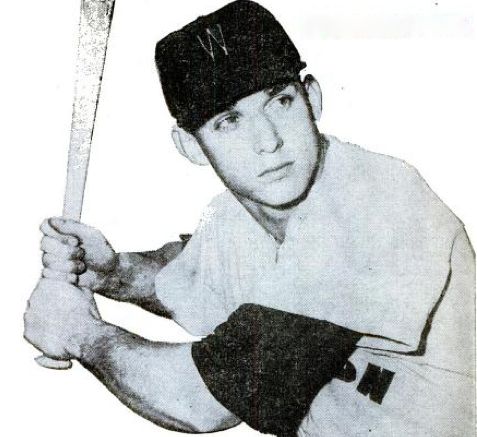
Allison, circa 1959

In 1963, Allison had 25 doubles, 35 home runs, 91 RBIs, led the league in runs scored (99) and in OPS (.911), and earned his second All-Star berth. In addition, he became the first of four Twins to lead the league in WAR, a stat that measures a player's overall production both in the field and at the plate. Other Twins leading the league in WAR include Zoilo Versalles, Rod Carew, and Joe Mauer, all of whom were named MVP in the seasons they did so. Only Allison did not win the MVP in the same season (finishing a distant 15th behind winner Elston Howard and behind teammates Camilo Pascual, Earl Battey, and Killebrew on the 1963 ballot).

He followed this up in 1964 with a 32-home run 86 RBIs performance that got him named to his third and final All-Star team, this time at first base. The next year, Allison suffered a broken left hand when he was hit by a pitch. Records reflect that he played in 135 games in 1965, in a 162 game season, playing 68 games after returning from the injury. In 1966, he was again hit by a pitch that broke his wrist, and played in only 70 games, but returned at the end of the season to knock a pinch-hit three-run homer against the New York Yankees on September 18, 1966.

During the Twins' 1965 World Series season, Allison had a down year, after suffering a fractured wrist on July 6th, hitting only .233 in 135 games. Before the injury he was hitting .267 with 12 home runs and 34 RBI, and after returning he hit .199 with 11 home runs and 44 RBIs. He continued his poor production versus the Los Angeles Dodgers, reaching base only 4 times (two walks, a double, and a home run in a game 6 win) and striking out 9 times in 16 at-bats, the last of which was against Sandy Koufax for the final out in Game 7 of the 1965 World Series. However, he had a memorable Game 2 of the Series. His bases-loaded double against Koufax and a great backhand diving catch of a Jim Lefebvre fly ball were the main contributors to the Twins victory. This catch has been called the best catch in Twins history and one of the most spectacular catches seen in World Series history. Harold Kaese of the Boston Globe considered it a better catch then the legendary World Series catches of Al Gionfriddo and Willie Mays, among others.

Allison's slide at the plate continued into the 1966 season. His wrist was again fractured when he was hit by a pitch from Jim Lonborg. He played in only 70 games and hit .233. However, he returned in a big way in 1967, hitting .258 with 24 home runs with 75 RBIs in a year which the league batting average was only .236.

In 13 seasons, Allison finished in the top ten in home runs eight times (1959, 1961–65, 1967–68). Particularly memorable home run feats included combining with Harmon Killebrew to become the first pair to hit grand slams in the same inning on July 18, 1962, hitting home runs in three consecutive at-bats on May 17, 1963, and teaming with Killebrew, Tony Oliva, and Jimmie Hall to hit four consecutive home runs on May 2, 1964.

== Personal life ==
During his baseball career, he worked during the off season in sales for Coca-Cola Bottling Midwest Co. in suburban Minneapolis. After retirement, he continued with that business, becoming a plant manager and a sales manager for Coca-Cola's Twin Cities Marketing Division.

== Illness and death ==
Thirteen years after his retirement, Allison began noticing problems with his coordination during a 1987 old-timers game at the Hubert H. Humphrey Metrodome. Running and even catching the ball became difficult. Following two years of doctor visits to learn what was wrong, the diagnosis was finally made — Allison was suffering from a progressive sporadic ataxia known as Olivo-Ponto cerebellar atrophy.

In 1990, Allison helped found the Bob Allison Ataxia Research Center at the University of Minnesota along with his wife Betty, sons Mark, Kirk, and Kyle, and former Twins' teammates Jim Kaat and Frank Quilici. He continued to battle this rare degenerative neurological disease for eight years, eventually losing his ability to walk, talk, write, and feed himself. Allison died of complications from ataxia on April 9, 1995, at the age of 60 in his Rio Verde, Arizona, home.

Following his death, the Minnesota Twins created the Bob Allison Award for the Twins player who exemplifies determination, hustle, tenacity, competitive spirit and leadership both on and off the field.

== See also ==
- List of Major League Baseball annual runs scored leaders
- List of Major League Baseball annual triples leaders
- List of Major League Baseball players who spent their entire career with one franchise
- List of Major League Baseball career home run leaders
