= Tony Oliva =

Cuban baseball player (born 1938)

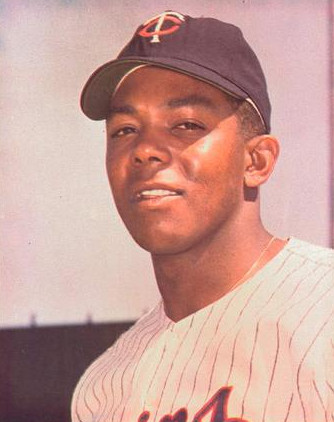
- Oliva with the Minnesota Twins in 1965
- Right fielder / Designated hitter
- Born: July 20, 1938 (age 88); Pinar del Río, Cuba
- Batted: Left Threw: Right

MLB debut
- September 9, 1962, for the Minnesota Twins

Last MLB appearance
- September 29, 1976, for the Minnesota Twins

MLB statistics
- Batting average: .304
- Home runs: 220
- Runs batted in: 947
- Stats at Baseball Reference

Teams
- Minnesota Twins (1962–1976)

Career highlights and awards
- 8× All-Star (1964–1971); 2× World Series champion (1987, 1991); AL Rookie of the Year (1964); Gold Glove Award (1966); 3× AL batting champion (1964, 1965, 1971); Minnesota Twins No. 6 retired; Minnesota Twins Hall of Fame

Member of the National

Baseball Hall of Fame
- Induction: 2022
- Vote: 75%
- Election method: Golden Days Era Committee

Tony Pedro Oliva Lopez (born Antonio Oliva Lopez Hernandes Javique; July 20, 1938) is a Cuban-American former professional baseball player and coach. He played his entire career in Major League Baseball (MLB) as a right fielder and designated hitter for the Minnesota Twins from 1962 to 1976. An eight-time All-Star player, Oliva was an integral member of the Twins teams that won the 1965 American League pennant and two consecutive American League Western Division titles in 1969 and 1970.

Oliva was named the American League (AL) Rookie of the Year in 1964 and won three American League batting championships as well as a Gold Glove Award during his career. Playing in baseball's "second dead-ball era", he was one of the game's best hitters during his first eight seasons. After eight seasons in the majors, Oliva's career was hampered by a series of severe knee injuries, forcing him to become a designated hitter during his final four years in baseball. He retired with a career batting average of .304.

Oliva was inducted into the Minnesota Sports Hall of Fame in 1988 and the Minnesota Twins Hall of Fame in 2000. The Twins retired Oliva's uniform number 6 in 1991. He was inducted into the Baseball Hall of Fame in 2022.

== Early life ==
Born in Pinar del Río Province, Cuba in 1938, he played baseball weekly with his father, brothers, and neighbors in a vacant lot near the family farm. Oliva's father, who worked in a tobacco factory and was famous for rolling the best cigars, was also a former semi-professional player who instructed Tony and helped him become "the best hitter in Pinar del Río". A scout for the Minnesota Twins noticed the youth and brought him to the United States to play professionally. He was reluctant to leave his parents and nine siblings, but his father encouraged him to become "rich and famous" in America.

== Professional baseball career ==
=== Minor leagues ===
Oliva arrived in the US in the spring of 1961. During spring training that year, he appeared in the Twins' final three games, collecting seven hits in ten at bats. The Twins, however, had already filled their minor league rosters and released Oliva, with some saying it was due to his poor outfield play. Having nowhere else to go, Oliva traveled to Charlotte, North Carolina to train with a friend who played for a Minnesota Twins Class A farm team. His quick wrists, long frame, and "unharnessed power" impressed Charlotte general manager Phil Howser, who placed a call and convinced the Twins to re-sign the potential star.

Due to a paperwork switch at Oliva's arrival in the US to reflect the name and birthdate of his younger brother Pedro Jr. (born 1941) in order to appear younger to major league scouts, many newspapers reported the 21-year-old Tony as his 18-year-old sibling. The name stuck and Oliva officially changed his name to Tony Pedro Oliva in the late 1990s.

The Twins assigned Oliva to the class-D Wytheville Twins in the Appalachian League, where he played in 64 games and led the league with a .410 batting average, but had a low fielding percentage of .854. After finishing second to Orlando Cepeda in batting average in the Puerto Rico leagues in winter ball, Oliva was sent to single-A Charlotte in the South Atlantic League, where he played 127 games and hit .350 with 17 home runs and 93 RBIs. He was called up to the major leagues with nine games left and debuted for the Twins on September 9, 1962, hitting a searing .444 in 12 plate appearances.

In 1963, he was invited to spring training with the Twins and management hoped that the lefty Oliva would counterbalance their right-handed sluggers Bob Allison and Harmon Killebrew. While there, he became friends with teammate, and fellow Cuban, shortstop Zoilo Versalles, who quickly became convinced that Oliva was "the new Ty Cobb", citing their similarities in hitting ability, speed, and arm strength. However, Oliva failed to make the Twins' major league team and was assigned to the Dallas-Fort Worth Rangers, the club's Class AAA affiliate in the Pacific Coast League. Disappointed, Oliva started the season slow, compiling a .235 average in his first two months. He recovered, however, and finished the minor league season with a .304 batting average with 23 home runs and 74 RBI. This earned him a call up for the final few games of the 1963 major league season. Once again he responded with a sizzling bat, hitting .429 in just 7 at-bats. Oliva first met César Tovar in 1963 and the two players became friends and later became roommates for seven years until 1972, when Tovar was traded to the Philadelphia Phillies.

=== Major leagues ===
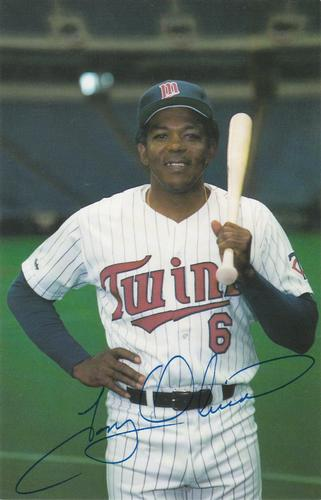
Oliva in 1987 during his coaching tenure with the Twins

Oliva was selected as a near-unanimous 1964 American League (AL) Rookie of the Year, receiving 19 of 20 first-place votes. Oliva was voted to his first All-Star game in his rookie year, but went 0-for-4 at the plate. His AL-leading .323 batting average made him the first player ever to win both the Rookie of the Year Award and AL batting title. He also paced the AL in hits (217), doubles (43), extra base hits (84), total bases (374), runs (109), and runs created (133). Oliva's 374 total bases tied a rookie record. Oliva finished fourth in MVP voting.

In 1965, Oliva won a second straight AL batting title with a .321 average, his back-to-back wins once again a baseball first. His performances were all the more noteworthy for falling right at the onset of baseball's "second deadball era", with only two other AL hitters reaching the .300 mark that season, (Carl Yastrzemski (.312) and Vic Davalillo (.301)). Oliva added 16 home runs, 98 runs batted in, and 107 runs. He led the AL in hits (185), runs created (108), sacrifice flies (10), and batting average (.321), good for a second-place finish in MVP voting to teammate and Twins spark plug Versalles. In his second All-Star game, Oliva entered as right fielder in the eighth inning, replacing game starter Rocky Colavito, and had a double in the ninth inning after pinch hitting in the seventh inning and grounding out.

Through the end of July in 1966, Oliva was leading the league with a .328 average. However, between August 21 and August 28 and September 13 and September 21, he slumped badly, collecting three hits in 29 at bats and four hits in 34 at bats respectively, which cost him a chance at his third straight batting title. Oliva finished with a .307 batting average and was the runner-up to Triple Crown winner and AL MVP Frank Robinson, who hit .316. For the third year in a row, Oliva led the AL in hits (191). Additionally, he won his only Gold Glove award, and finished sixth in MVP voting. One of the season's highlights came on June 9, 1966, in the seventh inning of a game against the Kansas City Athletics, where Oliva joined Harmon Killebrew, Don Mincher, Rich Rollins and Versalles to hit five home runs in a single inning. These five home runs, hit off starter Catfish Hunter (three) and reliever Paul Lindblad (two), stand as of 2021, tying an MLB record for the most home runs in a single inning.

After a somewhat off 1967, where he led the AL with 37 doubles and finished in the top 10 in batting average, slugging percentage, hits, total bases, RBIs, runs created, extra base hits, and intentional walks, Oliva's rebound in 1968 was cut short by injury. Missing the last 34 games, he once again hit .289, but so depressed were batting averages it was good for third in the AL by a single point (and only batting champ Yastrzemski topping .300 by a single point as well). He returned to form in 1969 to again place third in the AL with a .309 batting average, with 24 homers, 101 RBIs, and league leads in hits (197) and doubles (39). He finished third in batting average in the American League in 1970 at .325, with 23 home runs and 107 RBIs. He also led the AL in hits (204) for the fifth time, in doubles (36) for the fourth time, and finished second in MVP voting for the second time, this time to Baltimore's Boog Powell.

In 1971, Oliva won his third AL batting title with a .337 average and led the league in slugging percentage (.546). These feats at the end of a stretch of eight straight All-Star appearances that began his rookie season marked the high point of his career, as severe knee, leg, and shoulder injuries hampered his remaining playing days. His roommate Rod Carew often heard Oliva "moaning and groaning" and getting up to obtain ice for his sore knees during the night. He played just 10 games in 1972 before having season-ending surgery. Due to injuries and a 1973 American League rule change establishing a new position, he became the Twins' designated hitter that spring and remained in that role his final four seasons. Oliva would hit the first home run by a DH in league play on April 6, 1973. Just three months later, on July 3, 1973, Oliva also became the first DH to hit 3 home runs in a game against the Kansas City Royals in a 7-6 loss at Royals Stadium.

Oliva was a coach for the Twins after he retired as a player. As such, he holds the distinction of being the only on-field team member to appear with all three Minnesota Twins' World Series teams: star outfielder in 1965, hitting coach in 1987 and bench coach in 1991.

== MLB statistics ==
Years	G	AB	R	H	2B	3B	HR	RBI	SB	CS	BB	SO	AVG	OBP	SLG	OPS	E	FLD%
15	1,676	6,301	870	1,917	329	48	220	947	86	55	448	645	.304	.353	.476	.830	61	.975

== MLB awards ==
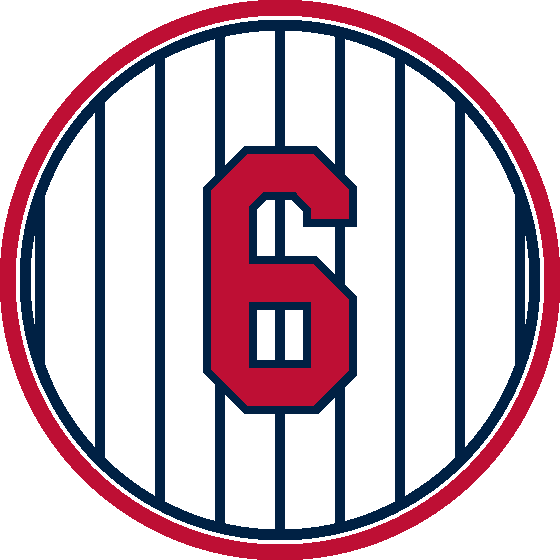
Tony Oliva's number 6 was retired by the Minnesota Twins in 1991.

Oliva's's major league awards:

Award / Honor	Time(s)	Date(s)
American League Rookie of the Year	1	1964
American League All-Star	8	1964–1971
American League Gold Glove Award (OF)	1	1966
American League Player of the Week	1	June 30, 1974

Oliva was the AL MVP runner-up in 1965 and 1970.

National Baseball Hall of Fame (2022)

=== Other awards, honors, and achievements ===
- World Series champion: 1987, 1991
- AL batting champion: 1964, 1965, 1971
- AL leader in slugging average: 1971
- AL leader in runs scored, total bases, runs created, and extra base hits: 1964
- AL leader in hits: 1964–1966, 1969, 1970
- AL leader in doubles: 1964, 1967, 1969, 1970
- AL leader in sacrifice flies: 1965
- AL leader in put outs as right fielder: 1964–1967, 1969, 1970
- AL leader in assists as right fielder: 1969, 1970
- AL leader in double plays turned as right fielder: 1966, 1970, 1971
- Minnesota Twins No. 6 retired: July 14, 1991.
- Minnesota Twins Hall of Fame: 2000
- Tony Oliva statue, Target Field: April 8, 2011.

== Hall of Fame candidacy ==
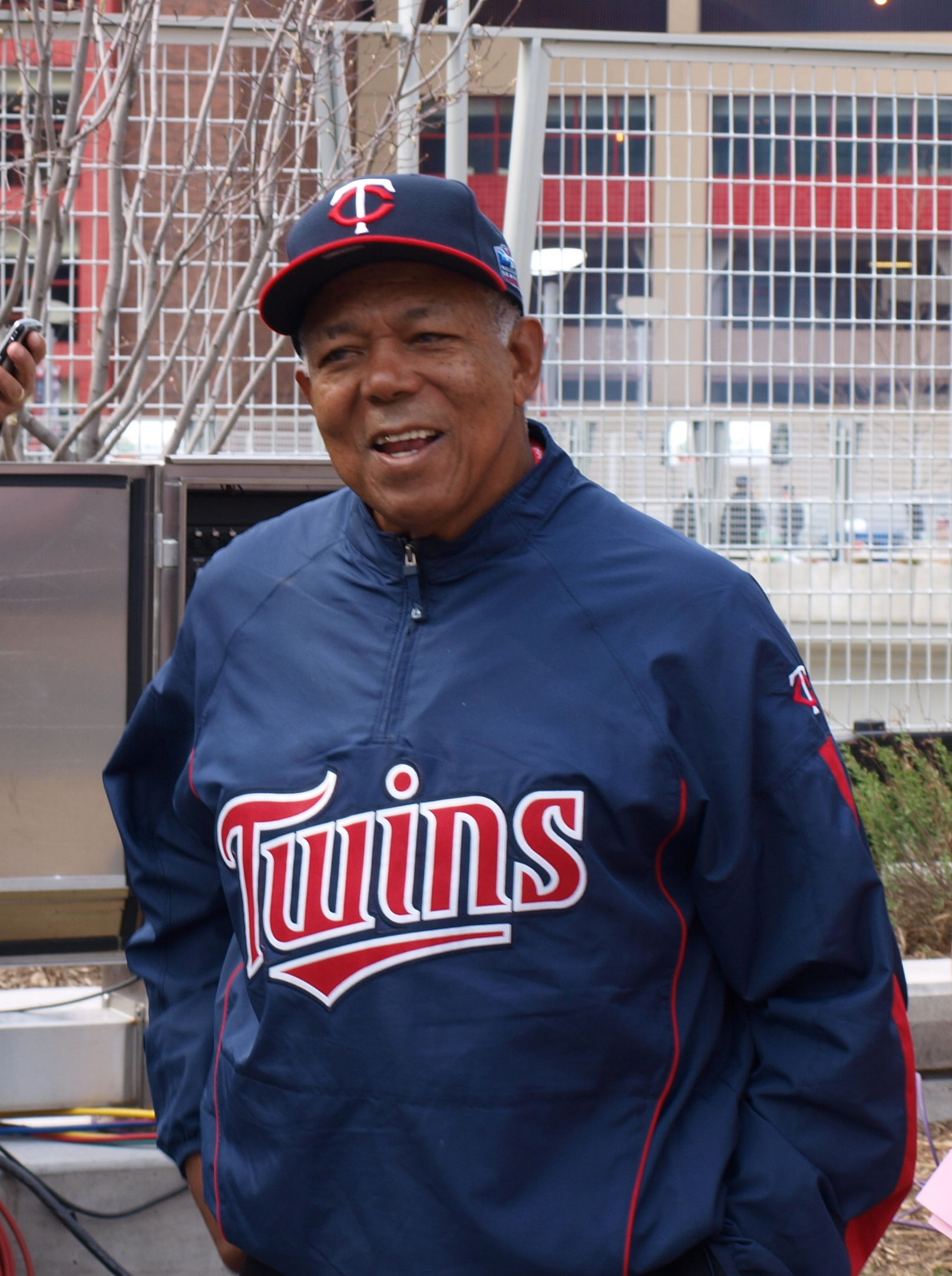
Oliva in 2010

Oliva was considered for election to the National Baseball Hall of Fame via voting of the Baseball Writers' Association of America (BWAA) from 1982 to 1996.

Writer Bill James, utilizing the Keltner list, determined that Oliva was a "viable Hall of Fame candidate", but ultimately did not endorse him as a Hall of Famer. Several contemporaries have endorsed Oliva's enshrinement in the Hall of Fame, including Tony Pérez, who mentioned in his 2000 induction speech that he hoped Oliva would soon be in the Hall of Fame.

In 2000, 2001, 2003, 2005, and 2007, Oliva was considered for the National Baseball Hall of Fame by its Veterans Committee's election, but was unsuccessful. He was considered again by the Hall of Fame's Golden Era Committee (from the 1947–1972 era) which voted in 2011, but was short by four of the required 12 votes needed for induction in 2012. In 2014, the Golden Era Committee considered him for the second time from their 10-candidate ballot, but both he and former infielder/outfielder Dick Allen were one vote short of election; one candidate was elected in 2011 and no one in 2014.

=== Golden Days Committee ===
The Golden Era Committee was replaced in July 2016 by a 16-member Golden Days Committee, to vote from a 10 candidate ballot for the 1950–1969 era. Oliva was voted into the Hall of Fame at their meeting on December 5, 2021, and was formally enshrined on July 24, 2022.

== Legacy ==
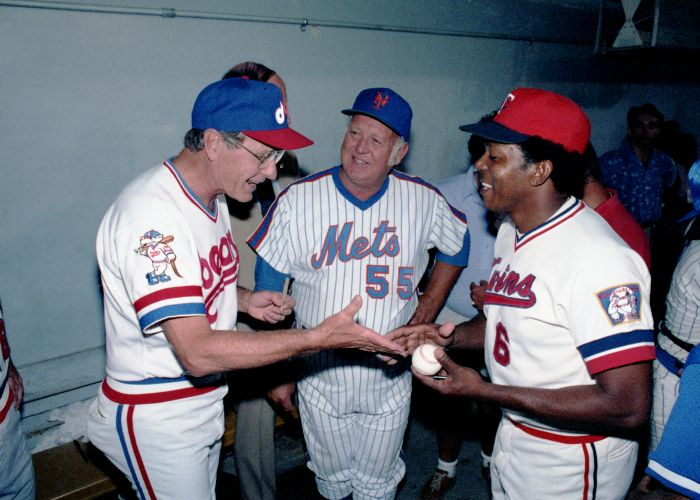
Oliva (right) with U.S. Vice President George H. W. Bush (left) at an old-timers' game in 1984

Throughout his 15-year career, Oliva possessed a "rather pleasant disposition" and was known as a positive influence in a team's clubhouse. He was popular with the fans and the media of the Twin Cities during his career, and was given the nickname "Tony-O".

Oliva had strong offensive numbers during an era heavily dominated by pitching. He batted .304 with 220 home runs, 947 RBI, 870 runs, 1,917 hits, 329 doubles, 48 triples, 448 bases on balls and 86 stolen bases in 1,676 games played. In 13 postseason games, he batted .314 with 3 home runs and 5 RBI. He was selected to the All-Star team his first eight seasons, surpassing Joe DiMaggio's previous record of six selections. In addition, he was a powerful-armed Gold Glove outfielder who led AL right fielders in putouts 6 times, double plays 3 times, and assists twice.

As a pinch hitter in his major league career, Oliva was very effective in that role. He batted .340 (32-for-94) with 2 home runs and 27 RBI.

In 1981, Lawrence Ritter and Donald Honig included him in their book The 100 Greatest Baseball Players of All Time. They explained what they called "the Smoky Joe Wood Syndrome", in which a player of truly exceptional talent but whose career was curtailed by injury, in spite of not having had career statistics that would quantitatively rank him with the all-time greats, should still be included on their list of the 100 greatest players.

At the end of his career in 1979 and again in 1991, Hall of Famer Catfish Hunter named Oliva the toughest hitter he ever had to face because "he could hit any pitch anywhere... he didn't have any weaknesses." In 2006, Cy Young Award winner Dean Chance said that Oliva and Carl Yastrzemski were the two toughest hitters he had to face in his career. In 2021, three-time All-Star Luis Tiant wrote that Oliva was the toughest hitter he had to face in his career.

== Personal life ==
Oliva started dating Gordette (DuBois) in the mid-1960s. They were married in Hitchcock, South Dakota in 1968 and settled in Bloomington, Minnesota. He currently lives in a house he bought in 1972 and all of his four children live within 10 miles (16 km) of their parents. As of 2015, Oliva also had four grandchildren.

== See also ==
- Major League Baseball titles leaders
- List of Gold Glove Award winners at outfield
- List of Major League Baseball annual doubles leaders
- List of Major League Baseball annual runs scored leaders
- List of Major League Baseball batting champions
- List of Major League Baseball career games played as a right fielder leaders
- List of Major League Baseball career putouts as a right fielder leaders
- List of Major League Baseball hit records
- List of Major League Baseball players from Cuba
- List of Major League Baseball players who spent their entire career with one franchise

== Book sources ==
- Aschburner, Steve (2012). Harmon Killebrew: Ultimate Slugger. Triumph Books. ISBN 9781600787027.
- Bjarkman, Peter (2010). Baseball with a Latin Beat: A History of the Latin American Game. McFarland. ISBN 9780786483082.
- Henninger, Thom (2015). Tony Oliva: The Life and Times of a Minnesota Twins Legend. University of Minnesota Press. ISBN 9781452944395.
- Thielman, Jim (2005). Cool of the Evening: The 1965 Minnesota Twins. Kirk House Publishers. ISBN 9781886513716.

Sporting positions
Preceded by Jim Lemon	Minnesota Twins first base coach 1985	Succeeded by Wayne Terwilliger
Preceded by Vacant	Minnesota Twins hitting coach 1986–1991	Succeeded by Terry Crowley
