= Lee Stange =

American baseball player and coach (1936–2018)

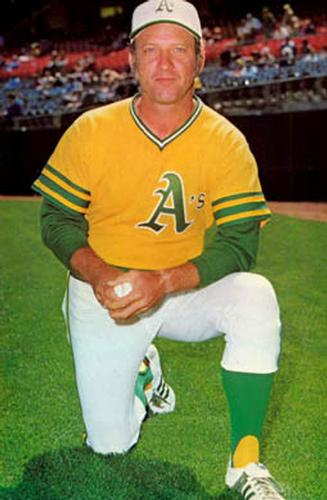
- Pitcher
- Born: October 27, 1936; Chicago, Illinois, U.S.
- Died: September 21, 2018 (aged 81); Melbourne, Florida, U.S.
- Batted: Right Threw: Right

MLB debut
- April 15, 1961, for the Minnesota Twins

Last MLB appearance
- September 21, 1970, for the Chicago White Sox

MLB statistics
- Win–loss record: 62–61
- Earned run average: 3.56
- Strikeouts: 718
- Stats at Baseball Reference

Teams
- Minnesota Twins (1961–1964); Cleveland Indians (1964–1966); Boston Red Sox (1966–1970); Chicago White Sox (1970)

Albert Lee Stange (/stæŋ/ STANG; October 27, 1936 – September 21, 2018) was an American professional baseball player and coach. During his playing career, the right-handed pitcher appeared in 359 games pitched in Major League Baseball over all or parts of ten seasons (1961–70) for the Minnesota Twins (1961–64), Cleveland Indians (1964–66), Boston Red Sox (1966–70) and Chicago White Sox (1970). He was listed as 5 feet 10 inches (1.78 m) tall and 170 pounds (77 kg).

== Biography ==
Born in Chicago, Stange grew up in Broadview, Illinois. He attended Proviso Township High School, in Maywood, Illinois, then Drake University on a football scholarship, but a knee injury led to him playing baseball instead. Stange was signed by the Washington Senators' organization before the 1957 season. In 1960, he won 20 games in the Class B Carolina League, and in 1961 he was promoted all the way to the majors as a member of the inaugural edition of the Twins, who had just moved to Minneapolis–Saint Paul from Washington. After two early-April relief performances, he spent the bulk of 1961 in Triple-A, then was recalled in September. On September 15, he earned his first MLB victory by throwing two scoreless rinnings in relief of Jack Kralick against the Indians.

The majority of his 359 MLB appearances were as a relief pitcher, but he did start 125 games. In 1963, Stange was 12–5 and finished sixth in the American League in earned run average (2.62) and fifth in winning percentage (.705). In 1967, he was 8–10 (2.77) for the pennant-winning "Impossible Dream" Red Sox, and pitched two scoreless innings in 1967 World Series Game 3 (October 7, 1967). He finished his career with a total of 62 wins, 61 losses, 32 complete games, 8 shutouts, 21 saves, 77 games finished, 718 strikeouts and only 344 walks in 1,216 innings pitched, and an ERA of 3.56.

Stange was later a pitching coach for the Red Sox (1972–74; 1981–84), Twins (1975) and Oakland Athletics (1977–79). He was a roving minor league pitching instructor in the Red Sox farm system in 1971, 1980 and from 1985 to 1994, and managed Oakland's Triple-A Tucson Toros farm club for the final weeks of the 1976 season. In 2005, Stange was named pitching coach for NCAA Division II Florida Institute of Technology. He was the stepfather of former major league infielder Jody Reed.

Stange died at age 81 on September 21, 2018.

== See also ==
- List of Major League Baseball single-inning strikeout leaders

Sporting positions
Preceded by Harvey Haddix; Johnny Podres	Boston Red Sox Pitching Coach; 1972–1974; 1981–1984	Succeeded by Stan Williams; Bill Fischer
Preceded by Buck Rodgers	Minnesota Twins Pitching Coach; 1975	Succeeded by Don McMahon
Preceded by Wes Stock	Oakland Athletics Pitching Coach; 1977–1979	Succeeded by Art Fowler
