= Bill Pleis =

American baseball player (1937–2025)

- Pitcher
- Born: August 5, 1937; St. Louis, Missouri, U.S.
- Died: October 17, 2025 (aged 88)
- Batted: Left Threw: Left

MLB debut
- April 16, 1961, for the Minnesota Twins

Last MLB appearance
- September 15, 1966, for the Minnesota Twins

MLB statistics
- Win–loss record: 21–16
- Earned run average: 4.07
- Strikeouts: 184
- Stats at Baseball Reference

Teams
- Minnesota Twins (1961–1966)

William Pleis III (/plaɪs/ PLYSE; August 5, 1937 – October 17, 2025) was an American professional baseball player, a left-handed pitcher who appeared in 190 Major League games between 1961 and 1966 for the Minnesota Twins. On April 22, 1961, Pleis notched the Twins' first-ever win in their new home state and home field, Metropolitan Stadium.

== Biography ==
Pleis, listed at 5 feet 10 inches (1.78 m) tall and 170 pounds (77 kg), was a relief pitcher for all but ten of his 190 big-league appearances. In 1965, he equaled his career season-high for saves (four) and won four other games as the Twins captured their first American League pennant and the franchise's first since 1933, when it was located in Washington. He appeared in the 1965 World Series against the Los Angeles Dodgers, a team he would serve as a longtime scout after the end of his playing career. He gave up two hits and an earned run in one inning pitched in Game 4, a game the Dodgers won 7–2 to even the series at two wins each. Los Angeles went on to prevail in seven games.

He retired from pitching after the 1968 season. He allowed 269 hits and 127 bases on balls in 280 2/3 innings pitched in the Majors, with 184 strikeouts, 13 saves and one complete game.

Pleis' son, Scott, was selected in the fourth round of the 1981 MLB draft before transitioning into a scouting career.

Bill Pleis died on October 17, 2025, at the age of 88.
