= Camilo Pascual =

Cuban baseball player (born 1934)

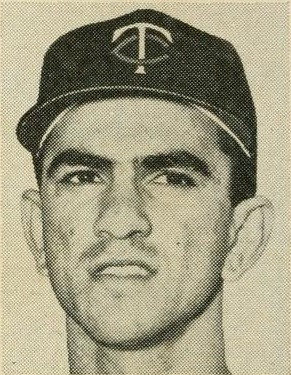
- Pitcher
- Born: January 20, 1934 (age 92); Havana, Cuba
- Batted: Right Threw: Right

MLB debut
- April 15, 1954, for the Washington Senators

Last MLB appearance
- May 5, 1971, for the Cleveland Indians

MLB statistics
- Win–loss record: 174–170
- Earned run average: 3.63
- Strikeouts: 2,167
- Stats at Baseball Reference

Teams
- Washington Senators / Minnesota Twins (1954–1966); Washington Senators (1967–1969); Cincinnati Reds (1969); Los Angeles Dodgers (1970); Cleveland Indians (1971)

Career highlights and awards
- 7× All-Star (1959²–1960², 1961²–1962², 1964); 3× AL strikeout leader (1961–1963); Minnesota Twins Hall of Fame

Member of the Cuban

Baseball Hall of Fame
- Induction: 2014

Camilo Alberto Pascual Lus (born January 20, 1934) is a Cuban former Major League Baseball right-handed pitcher. During an 18-year baseball career (1954–71), he played for the original modern Washington Senators franchise (which became the Minnesota Twins in 1961), the second edition of the Washington Senators, Cincinnati Reds, Los Angeles Dodgers, and Cleveland Indians. He was also known by the nicknames "Camile" and "Little Potato."

Pascual's best pitches were his fastball and devastating overhand curveball, described by Ted Williams as the "most feared curveball in the American League for 18 years". His curveball has been rated in the top 10 of all-time. Over his career, he compiled 174 wins, 2,167 strikeouts, and a 3.63 earned run average. He was elected to the American League All-Star team 5 times (from 1959 to 1962, and in 1964). In the second 1961 All-Star Game, he pitched three hitless innings and struck out four. He holds the opening day strikeout record as he fanned 15 in a 10–1 win versus the Boston Red Sox in the 1960 season opener.

== Early life ==
Pascual was born on January 20, 1934, in Havana, Cuba. His older brother Carlos was also a future pitcher in Cuba and in American major league baseball. Carlos had the Cuban-Spanish nickname Patato, meaning short or a runt. Pascual, as the younger brother, became known as Patato Pequeño. When they later came to the United States, patato, sounding like potato, was mistranslated; and the brothers became known in the U.S. as Potato and Little Potato.

== Playing career ==
=== Minor leagues and Cuban League ===
Pascual had begun playing amateur baseball in Cuba as a teenager, but his first professional play came in the United States. As a 17-year-old, Pascual left Havana and spent the 1951 season as a minor league free agent pitching for the Class-D Chickasha Chiefs in the Oklahoma Sooner State League and two Class-C teams, the Big Spring Broncs in the Longhorn League and Geneva Robins in the New York Border League. The latter team was made up largely of Cuban players signed by Washington Senator's scout Joe Cambria, including future Minnesota Twins teammate Julio Bécquer. Pascal finished the season with a combined record of 5–4 with a 4.64 ERA and 46 walks in 64 innings. Despite his less than overwhelming stats, the 18-year-old Pascual was signed by the Washington Senators as an amateur free agent prior to the start of the 1952 season.

Pascual spent the 1952 season in Class-B pitching for the Havana Cubans and the Tampa Smokers in the Florida International League, improving to an 8–6 record with a 2.88 ERA and only 66 walks in 122 innings over 24 games. His first professional play in Cuba came in the 1952–53 Winter League, playing for Tigres de Marianao. Pascual learned his renowned curveball from Cuban pitching legend and Marianao manager Adolfo Luque. He was back with the Florida League's Havana Cubans for the entire 1953 season, and compiled similar stats as the year before (10–6, 3.00 ERA, 68 walks, 141 Inn in 25 games).

Following the 1953 season, he was traded from Marianao to his hometown Elefantes de Cienfuegos in the Cuban League, competing for the Caribbean World Series. The team won championships in 1956, 1960 and 1961. One of his teammates was Pedro Ramos, with whom he formed a top pitching duo. Ramos also would be a future teammate on the Washington Senators. Pascual continued to play for Cienfuegos until Fidel Castro closed the country in 1961. Pascual was only able to leave Cuba for the United States in 1961 after high level negotiations. Pascual was a Cuban League Most Valuable Player (MVP) in 1955–56, and was one of the decades old league's historically best pitchers.

=== Major leagues ===
==== Washington Senators/Minnesota Twins ====
Pascual would go north with the Senators in 1954 and would make his major league debut on April 15, mopping up the last 3 innings of a 6–1 loss to the Boston Red Sox for losing pitcher Bob Porterfield. The 20-year-old Pascual had an encouraging rookie season for the 66–88 Senators, finishing 4–7 with a 4.22 ERA, 3 saves and one complete game in 48 appearances (3 starts). However, walks would continue to plague the young pitcher, as he finished the season with a strikeout-to-walk ratio of less than one (60 strikeouts and 61 walks).

Pascual continued to be used primarily as a reliever in 1955 and improved his strikeout ratio, but this was about the only statistic he improved on over his rookie season as he finished with a 2–12 record and 6.14 ERA – mirroring the club as a whole which won only 53 games. However, Pascual steadily improved, lowering his ERA and increasing his win total every year from 1955 to 1959. In 1959, he was named to his first of four consecutive All-Star Teams, making the August 3, 1959 All-Star roster (though not the July 1959 team). Pascual finished 1959 with 17–10 record, a 2.64 ERA, and 185 strikeouts in 238 2/3 innings. He also led the league in both complete games (17) and shutouts (6), as well as WAR, while also receiving some support in the MVP balloting.

The period from 1959 to 1964 would see Pascual's peak years. He would win at least 12 games every season while leading the league in complete games, shutouts, and strikeouts three times each. He was selected to American League All-Star teams in five of those years (both 1960 All-Star teams, the second 1961 All-Star team, both 1962 All-Star teams, and the 1964 team, in addition to his 1959 selection); actually playing in three of those games (1961–62, 1964). During that time, the Senators moved to Minnesota, beginning the 1961 season as the Minnesota Twins, and Pascal moved with the team.

In 1962, Pascual went 20–11 and led the league in complete games, shutouts and strikeouts to help notch his first 20-win season. In a reversal from his earlier career, his 3.5–1 strikeout to walk ratio also led the American League. In 1963, he had arguably his best season with a 21-9 win lost record, a 2.46 ERA, leading the league in complete games and 202 strikeouts. In 1964, his record fell to 15–12, but the team overall was not as good as the previous two years, falling to sixth place with a record below .500.

1965 saw the Twins/Washington franchise return to the World Series for the first time since Washington lost the 1933 series to the New York Giants. However, after starting the season 8–2, injuries limited Pascual to nine relatively ineffective second-half starts, and shoulder surgery in August. He recovered in time for the team's stretch run and American League pennant win, but lost his World Series matchup with Claude Osteen in Game 3 against the Los Angeles Dodgers. The Dodgers defeated the Twins 4–3 to win the World Series. Pascual continued to have arm problems in 1966 and only pitched 103 innings in 21 games, both career lows.

==== New Washington Senators, Reds, Dodgers, Cleveland ====
In 1961, an American League expansion team began play in Washington, D.C., once again called the Washington Senators.

Seeing the writing on the wall, the Twins traded Pascual and once-promising second baseman Bernie Allen on December 3, 1966 to the new Washington Senators for 35-year-old relief pitcher Ron Kline. Although no longer over-powering or the durable innings-eater he had once been, Pascual had a minor renaissance during the 1967 and 1968 seasons while in Washington. He won a total of 25 games while leading the Senator' staff in wins and finishing second in both innings and strikeouts both seasons.

Pascal was the Senators opening day pitcher in 1969, the seventh time he had the honor. However, Pascual got off to a brutal start in 1969 (2-5, 6.83 ERA, 38 walks in 55 1/3 innings) and Washington sold his rights to the Cincinnati Reds on July 7, where he gave up seven runs in seven innings over the rest of the year. Unable to make the club in spring training 1970, the Reds released Pascual on April 4, 1970 or April 13, 1970, with the Los Angeles Dodgers signing him on April 13, 1970. He pitched for the Dodgers until August and for the Cleveland Indians for the first half of the 1971 season, but only saw action in a total of 19 games and he retired at the end of the season.

==== Legacy ====
Over his career, Pascual led the league in strikeouts in 1961 (221), 1962 (206), and 1963 (202) and as of the start of the 2025 season, he is 71st on the all-time strikeout list (2,167). However, he was also in the top 10 in the league in walks and home runs allowed five times in his career and is 87th and 120th all-time in those categories as of the start of the 2025 season. Pascual led the league in complete games three times (1959, 62, 63), and came in second two more times (1961, 64). Pascual was a 20-game winner twice, in 1962–63, and also finished with a career-high in complete games (18) in both of those seasons.

Pascual posted a .205 batting average (198-for-967) with 71 runs, 32 doubles, 5 triples, 5 home runs, 81 RBI and 46 bases on balls. Defensively, he recorded a .973 fielding percentage. He is one of only 7 pitchers in MLB history to hit 2 grand slams, the first on August 14, 1960, in a game against the New York Yankees, and the second on April 27, 1965 in the 1st inning of a game against the Cleveland Indians.

Yankee shortstop Tony Kubek said of Pascual's curveball, “'He’d come straight over the top with it and it would just dive off the table. The spin was so tight, you couldn’t identify the pitch until it was too late. It didn’t flutter, it didn’t hang, it just kept biting. When Pascual was right, nobody had a chance. That curve was unhittable.'”

== Coach and scout ==
After his playing career ended, Pascual retired to Miami where he had lived since 1960. From 1978 to 1980, Pascual was the Minnesota Twins pitching coach for manager Gene Mauch. He scouted for the Oakland Athletics from 1982–1988, and then for the Dodgers beginning in 1989. After 1989, he worked as an international scout for the New York Mets and the Dodgers. He was originally hired by the Dodgers to scout in Venezuela, but scouted players from other nations as well. Among the major leaguers Pascual has signed are Jose Canseco, Alex Cora, Omar Daal, Miguel Cairo, and Franklin Gutiérrez. He served as an international scout until he had almost turned 80. His brother Carlos Pascual scouted for the Yankees, Baltimore Orioles and Mets, most notably signing Dwight "Doc" Gooden for the Mets.

== Honors ==
In 1983, Pascual was elected to the Cuban Baseball Hall of Fame. Then, in 1996 he gained induction into the Caribbean Baseball Hall of Fame as part of their first class. His six victories in the Caribbean Series ties him with José Bracho and Rubén Gómez for the most all-time wins in the tournament.

On May 29, 2010, he was elected in the inaugural class of the Latino Baseball Hall of Fame at the Roman Amphitheater in Altos de Chavón, in the Dominican Republic. He later became the 24th former Twins player inducted into the Twins Hall of Fame, during a ceremony held on July 15, 2012.

He was honored on February 18, 2017, when his name was added to the "Pitching Wall of Great Achievement" at the Ted Williams Museum in St. Petersburg, Florida.

He was named Cuba's outstanding athlete of 1959.

In 2020, The Athletic ranked Pascal's 1963 season as the third best by a right-handed pitcher in Twins history, and his 1962 season as eighth best.

== See also ==
- List of Major League Baseball annual strikeout leaders
- List of Major League Baseball career strikeout leaders
