= Harmon Killebrew =

American baseball player (1936–2011)

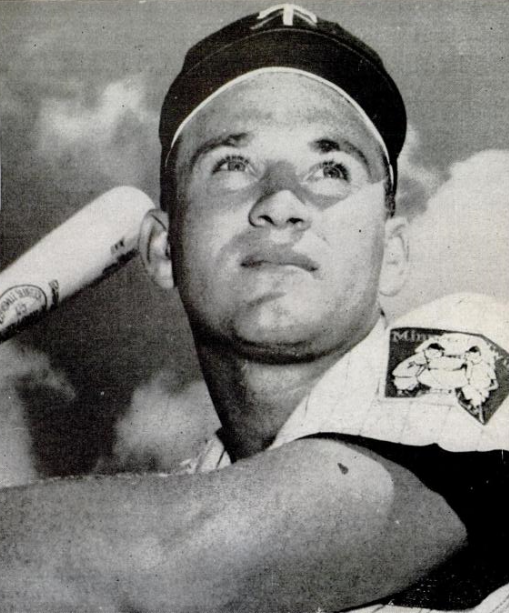
- Killebrew with the Minnesota Twins in 1962
- First baseman / Third baseman / Left fielder
- Born: June 29, 1936; Payette, Idaho, U.S.
- Died: May 17, 2011 (aged 74); Scottsdale, Arizona, U.S.
- Batted: Right Threw: Right

MLB debut
- June 23, 1954, for the Washington Senators

Last MLB appearance
- September 26, 1975, for the Kansas City Royals

MLB statistics
- Batting average: .256
- Hits: 2,086
- Home runs: 573
- Runs batted in: 1,584
- Stats at Baseball Reference

Teams
- Washington Senators / Minnesota Twins (1954–1974); Kansas City Royals (1975)

Career highlights and awards
- 13× All-Star (1959, 1959², 1961, 1961², 1963–1971); AL MVP (1969); 6× AL home run leader (1959, 1962–1964, 1967, 1969); 3× AL RBI leader (1962, 1969, 1971); Minnesota Twins No. 3 retired; Minnesota Twins Hall of Fame; Washington Nationals Ring of Honor

Member of the National

Baseball Hall of Fame
- Induction: 1984
- Vote: 83.1% (fourth ballot)

Harmon Clayton Killebrew Jr. (/ˈkɪlɪbruː/; June 29, 1936 – May 17, 2011), nicknamed "the Killer" and "Hammerin' Harmon", was an American professional baseball player as a first baseman, third baseman, and left fielder. He spent most of his 22-year career in Major League Baseball (MLB) with the Minnesota Twins. A prolific power hitter, Killebrew had the fifth-most home runs in major league history at the time of his retirement. He was second only to Babe Ruth in American League (AL) home runs, and was the AL career leader in home runs by a right-handed batter. Killebrew was inducted into the National Baseball Hall of Fame in 1984.

Killebrew was 5 feet 11 inches (180 cm) and 213 pounds (97 kg). His compact swing generated tremendous power and made him one of the most feared power hitters of the 1960s, when he hit at least 40 home runs per season eight times. In total Killebrew led the league six times in home runs and three times in RBIs, and was named to 13 All-Star teams. In 1965, he played in the World Series with the Twins, who lost to the Los Angeles Dodgers. His finest season was 1969, when he hit 49 home runs, recorded 140 RBIs and won the AL Most Valuable Player Award while helping lead the Twins to the AL West pennant.

With quick hands and exceptional upper body strength, Killebrew was known for both the frequency and distance of his homers. He hit the longest home runs ever recorded at Minnesota's Metropolitan Stadium (520 ft (160 m)), and Baltimore's Memorial Stadium (471 ft (144 m)), and was the first of four players to hit a ball over the left field roof at Detroit's Tiger Stadium. Despite his nicknames and his powerful style of play, Killebrew was regarded as a quiet, kind man.

After retiring from baseball, Killebrew became a television broadcaster for several baseball teams from 1976 to 1988. He also served as a hitting instructor for the Oakland Athletics.

== Early life ==
Killebrew was born and raised in Payette, Idaho, the youngest of four children born to Harmon Clayton Sr. and Katherine Pearl (May) Killebrew. His father, a painter and sheriff, was a member of an undefeated football team at Millikin College, and was later named an All-American while playing for eventual Pro Football Hall of Fame coach Greasy Neale. According to family legend, Harmon Killebrew's grandfather was the strongest man in the Union Army, winning every available heavyweight wrestling championship. Clayton encouraged Harmon and his brothers to stay active in various sports before his sudden death in 1953 at age 59.

As a child, Killebrew played baseball at Walter Johnson Memorial Field, named after the Hall of Fame pitcher who spent part of his childhood in Idaho. He worked as a farmhand in his youth, lifting ten-gallon milk cans, each weighing about 95 pounds (43 kg). Killebrew earned 12 letters in various sports and was named an All-American quarterback at Payette High School; the school retired his uniform number. He was offered an athletic scholarship by the University of Oregon, but declined the offer.

In the early 1950s, Senator Herman Welker of Idaho told Washington Senators owner Clark Griffith about Killebrew, who was hitting for an .847 batting average for a semi-professional baseball team at the time. Griffith told his farm director Ossie Bluege about the tip and Bluege flew to Idaho to watch Killebrew play. The Boston Red Sox also expressed interest but Bluege succeeded in signing him to a $50,000 ($599,442 today) contract on June 19, 1954.

== Professional career ==
=== Washington Senators / Minnesota Twins (1954–1974) ===
Killebrew signed his contract under the bonus rule in effect at the time. Since he received a bonus of over $4,000 ($58,000 today), Major League Baseball rules required that he spend two full seasons on the major league roster. He made his major league debut four days after signing and six days from his 18th birthday (becoming the youngest active player in the majors at the time), running for pinch-hitter Clyde Vollmer, who had been hit by a pitch with the bases loaded by Chicago White Sox starter Jack Harshman. On August 23, 1954, Killebrew made his first start in the second game of a doubleheader against the Philadelphia Athletics, hitting two singles and a double as the Senators won, 10–3. A year and one day after making his major league debut, Killebrew hit his first major league home run on June 24, 1955, in the fifth inning off Detroit Tigers starter Billy Hoeft, five days shy of his 19th birthday. In his first two seasons, Killebrew struck out 34 times in only 93 at bats, recording a .215 batting average with four home runs. Killebrew also had defensive difficulties at third base, where he played behind veteran Eddie Yost.

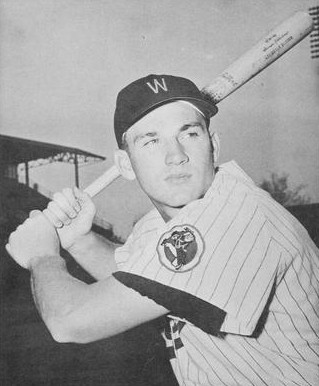
Killebrew with the Senators in 1959

When Killebrew's bonus period expired in 1956, he was sent to the Senators' minor league affiliate in Charlotte of the South Atlantic League. He returned to the majors in early May. On May 29, after being forced into action when regular second baseman Pete Runnels was injured early in a game against the Orioles, Killebrew hit two home runs, including only the second ball ever hit over a wire barrier in Baltimore's Memorial Stadium's center field. Killebrew had a .115 average through June 16, and as a result was sent back to Charlotte; he finished the season there with a .325 batting average and 15 home runs in 70 games. Killebrew spent most of the 1957 season with the Southern Association's Chattanooga Lookouts, where he hit a league-high 29 home runs with 101 RBIs and was named to the All-Star Game. While in Chattanooga, Killebrew became the only player to hit a home run over the center field wall at Engel Stadium, 471 feet (144 m) from home plate. In 1958, he was briefly promoted to Indianapolis of the American Association but struggled and was sent back to Chattanooga for most of the season. Killebrew finished the season with 38 games played in Indianapolis and 86 in Chattanooga, where he hit .308 with 17 home runs. He also played a combined 22 games for the Senators in 1957 and 1958.

Calvin Griffith took over the Senators after his uncle Clark Griffith died in 1955, and decided Killebrew was ready to become the Senators' regular third baseman. Griffith traded the 32-year-old Eddie Yost to the Detroit Tigers on December 6, 1958, and Killebrew became the starting third baseman. From May 1 to May 17, he had five multi-home run games and his first five-RBI game on May 12. With 28 home runs by mid-season, he started the first 1959 All-Star Game and was a reserve in the second. Killebrew attracted so much attention in Washington that he was visited by President Dwight D. Eisenhower, who frequently attended games, and Griffith turned down a $500,000 offer for Killebrew from the Cincinnati Reds. Killebrew finished the season with 42 home runs to tie for the American League lead; it also tied the Senators' single-season record set by his teammate Roy Sievers two years earlier. Although 1959 proved his breakout season, he was ineligible for the Rookie of the Year Award because of his previous sparse experience. Instead, the award went to teammate Bob Allison.

Killebrew was bothered by injury early in the 1960 season. In March, he had surgery for nasal irritation, and a recurring hamstring injury caused him to miss most of May. On his return, he remained in the lineup for the rest of the season, finishing the year with 31 home runs in 124 games. Killebrew's arrival and home runs did little to improve the Senators' record, as they finished in the second division of the American League every year he played for Washington, including four years in last place. After the 1960 season, the Senators moved to Minnesota and became the Minnesota Twins.

==== 1961–1965 ====
For the franchise's first year in Minnesota, Killebrew was named team captain by manager Cookie Lavagetto. He responded by hitting 46 home runs, breaking the franchise record he had tied two years earlier. Among his other production, Killebrew drove in a team-leading 122 RBIs, posted a career-best batting average of .288 and had a slugging percentage of over .600 for the only time in his career. In addition, he had a career-high seven triples, tying for the team lead, and led the Twins in runs, total bases and walks. On June 12, 1961, Killebrew had the only five-hit game of his career, though in a losing effort. Killebrew was named to both 1961 All-Star games. He did not play in the second, but in the first, he hit a pinch hit home run in the sixth inning. After the season ended, Killebrew took part in a home run hitting contest with Jim Gentile and Roger Maris, whose 61 home runs that year broke the single-season record; Killebrew hit 20 to win the contest.

After his seven-triple season, his speed began to decrease and he could no longer regularly score triples due to pulling his quadriceps during the 1962 season. Killebrew moved to left field, where he started off the season slowly. He hit under .200 in both April and June, and because of this Killebrew was not selected to play in either 1962 All-Star Game, the last season he was not named an All-Star before 1972. On July 18 in a game against the Cleveland Indians, Killebrew and Bob Allison became the first teammates since 1890 to hit grand slams in the same inning as the Twins scored 11 runs in the first. Over the course of the season, Killebrew hit 48 home runs, 126 RBIs, and had 107 walks, all career highs at the time. No one else in the AL managed even 40 home runs and he also led the league in RBIs. Killebrew's 48 home runs also broke the franchise record for the second year in a row. Not all his stats were positive; Killebrew's batting average dropped from .288 in 1961 to .243 and he struck out a career-worst 142 times, leading the AL.

Killebrew's efforts were rewarded in 1963 when he agreed to a contract for about $40,000 ($420,652 today). He started the season off slowly, and he missed the second half of April and early May due to a right knee injury that was slow to heal. Killebrew continued his hitting prowess for the Twins upon his return, and at one point led them on a six-game winning streak. On September 21, Killebrew hit three home runs in a game for the only time in his career in the first game of a doubleheader against the Boston Red Sox. Killebrew finished the season with a .258 batting average, 45 home runs, and 96 RBI, and led the league in home runs and slugging percentage (.555). He had surgery on his troublesome right knee after the season ended.

Having played left field for the previous three years with a below-average throwing arm, the additional complication of Killebrew's knee surgery necessitated a move to the infield. For the remainder of his career, he played only 19 games in the outfield. He finished the 1964 season with a .270 batting average, 49 home runs, and 111 RBI; he led the AL in home runs for the third consecutive year.

The Twins finally won the American League pennant during the 1965 season. On July 11, the day before the All-Star break, the defending AL champion Yankees had a one-run lead over the Twins going into the bottom of the 9th inning, but Killebrew hit a two-run home run for the win. Two days later, Killebrew started the All-Star Game at his home field, Metropolitan Stadium, and hit a game-tying two-run home run, erasing what had been a 5–0 National League lead. Elected to play first base on his fifth All-Star team, Killebrew became the first player in All-Star game history to be elected at three different positions, having previously been selected to play third base (1959 and 1961) and left field (1963 and 1964).

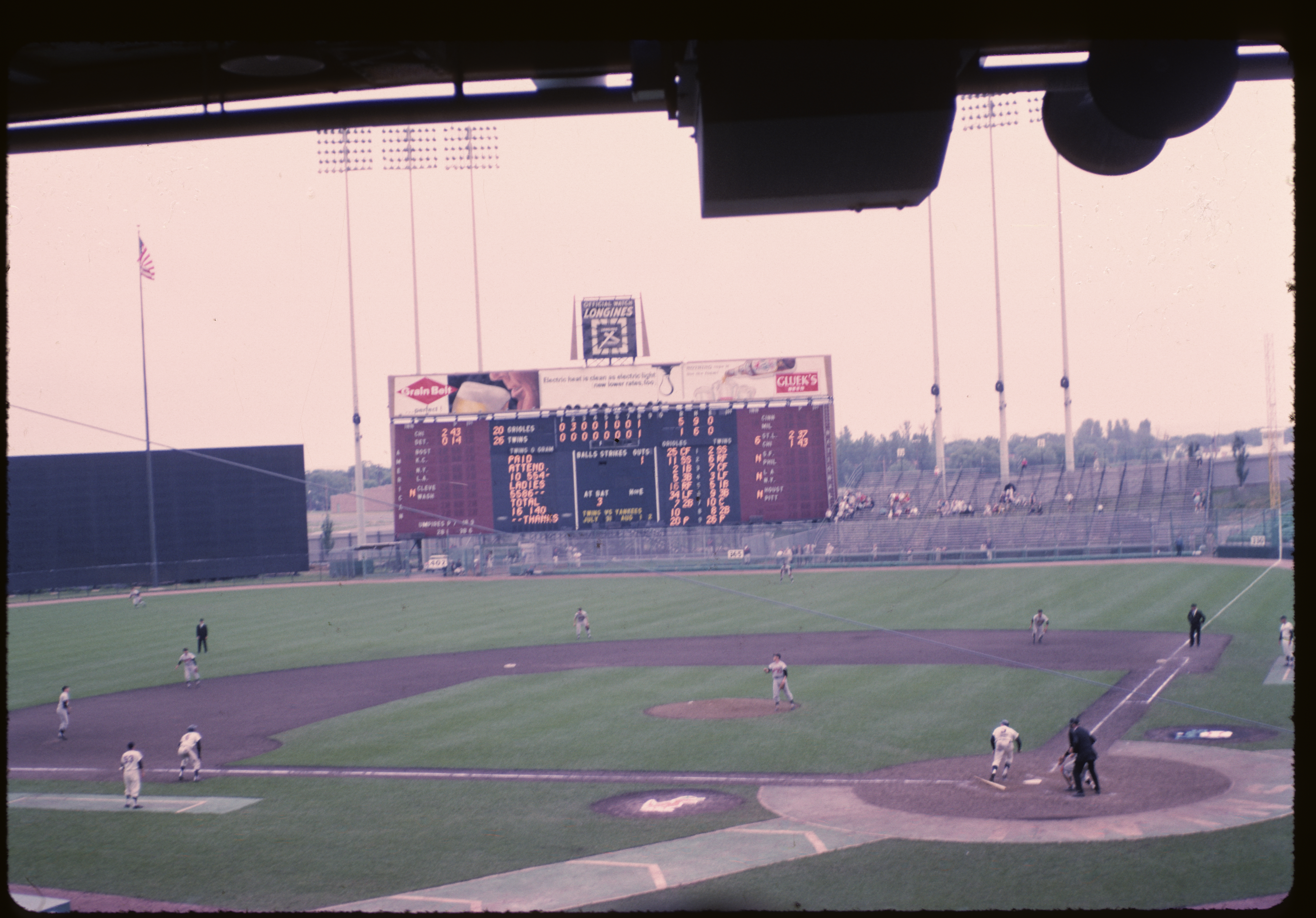
Killibrew hits a single at Metropolitan Stadium on July 30, 1964, driving in Tony Oliva.

Killebrew drove in the tying or winning run seven times in 1965 before suffering an injury on August 2. During a game against the Orioles, Twins third baseman Rich Rollins made a poor throw to first and while trying to save the play, Killebrew collided with the runner and dislocated his elbow, putting him out of action until mid-September. Despite his absence, the Twins had a win–loss record of 28–19 and even extended their first place lead. Killebrew ended the regular season with 25 home runs and 75 RBI, his lowest numbers in a full season due to the injury. In the 1965 World Series against the Los Angeles Dodgers, Killebrew and Zoilo Versalles led the Twins with .286 batting averages, and Killebrew hit a home run off Don Drysdale in Game 4. Minnesota was shut out in three games and the Dodgers won the series in seven.

==== 1966–1969 ====
At the start of the 1966 season, Killebrew hit few home runs; halfway through May, he had hit only two, his lowest total at that point of a season since 1960, when he had missed the first two months of the season. He later increased his tally to 39 and finished the season with a .281 batting average and 110 RBIs. He led the AL with 103 walks and finished 4th in Most Valuable Player Award (MVP) voting after Frank Robinson, Brooks Robinson, and Boog Powell of the American League leading Baltimore Orioles.

During the 1967 season Killebrew hit the then longest home run recorded at Metropolitan Stadium, a June 3 shot off Lew Burdette in the 4th inning that landed in the second deck of the bleachers. The Twins, led by Killebrew, were in the pennant race throughout the season, and had a one-game lead as the final two games of the season began against the Boston Red Sox. Having to win only once to clinch the pennant, Killebrew hit a home run in the first game and recorded two hits in each game, but Boston won twice and Minnesota finished in a second place tie with the Detroit Tigers. Killebrew finished the season with a .269 batting average and 113 RBIs, tied AL Triple Crown winner Carl Yastrzemski with 44 home runs, and led the league with 131 walks. He also finished a distant second in MVP voting to the Boston star.

In April 1968 Killebrew served as a prosecution witness in a case where his name was being used to fraudulently sell stocks in Idaho. The baseball season proved unsuccessful for Killebrew, whose batting average barely passed .200 most of the year; after a strong start, he hit below .200 in both May and June and his average stood at .204 with 13 home runs going into the all-star break. Even so, he was selected as the starting first baseman in the All-Star Game and Killebrew said that, owing to his poor start, he was "surprised" and "embarrassed" by the selection. During the third inning of the game he stretched for a ball thrown by shortstop Jim Fregosi, his foot slipped, and he did the splits, rupturing his left medial hamstring. He was carried from the field by a stretcher. At the time, the injury was considered career-threatening, but after missing about six weeks, he returned to limited action in September.

After enduring seven months of rehabilitation for his injury, Killebrew remained in pain but rebounded to have his best season in 1969. On July 5, Killebrew set a career-high with six RBIs in a game against the Oakland Athletics. On September 7 he topped that mark with a three-run homer and a grand slam in the first two innings, leading the team to another defeat of the Athletics . Killebrew led the best offense in the league and rookie manager Billy Martin's Twins won the new American League West division as a result.

For the season, Killebrew set career highs in RBIs, runs, walks and on-base percentage, tied his career high with 49 home runs, and even registered eight of his 19 career stolen bases, en route to winning his only Most Valuable Player Award. Playing in all 162 games, he led the majors in home runs and RBI (140), while leading the AL in on-base percentage (.427), walks (145) and intentional walks (20). As of 2021, Killebrew's home run, RBI, and walk totals from 1969 remain team records, and his 145 walks are tied for the 20th highest single season total in MLB history and 7th highest for a right-handed batter. In the 1969 American League Championship Series, the Baltimore Orioles used their pitching staff, the best in the league, to defeat Minnesota and win the series three games to none. Baltimore avoided Killebrew by walking him six times in the three games to avoid pitching to him, which was as many times as they walked the rest of the Twins team.

==== 1970–1974 ====
After his MVP season, Killebrew signed a new contract with the Twins worth $90,000 ($746,144 today). He was set to lead a team that had undergone a lot of change; Killebrew was one of only four Twins remaining from the 1965 pennant-winning club. He spent most of the season's first half continuing his success, and found Baltimore's Brooks Robinson rivalling him for the third base spot during the All-Star voting process; the two were neck-and-neck throughout. He continued his success through the second half of the year, and at season's end had hit 41 home runs with 113 RBIs and finished third in MVP voting behind teammate and runner-up Tony Oliva and Baltimore's Boog Powell. In a rematch of the previous season the Twins again faced Powell and the Orioles in the 1970 American League Championship Series. Killebrew upped his performance and hit two home runs in three games, but Minnesota was again swept.

Killebrew reached 40 home runs in a season for the final time in 1970 and also made his last appearance in the postseason. His contract continued to grow in value though, and before the 1971 season began he was awarded the first $100,000 ($794,988 today) contract in Twins history. Killebrew appeared in his last All-Star Game in 1971, hitting a two-run home run off Ferguson Jenkins to provide the margin of victory for the AL. He finished the season with a .254 batting average, 114 walks, 119 RBI, the latter two of which led the league, and 28 home runs. Killebrew hit his 498th home run on June 22, 1971, but a sprained right toe made his run to milestone number 500 a slow one. He hit number 499 more than a month later and finally hit number 500 off a Mike Cuellar slow curveball in the first inning of an August 10 home game; at the time, he was the 10th player in history to hit 500 home runs. He then wasted no time in hitting number 501, knocking a Cuellar fastball over the fences later in the same game.

In 1972, Killebrew showed signs of slowing down. He missed his first All-Star Game since 1962, but instead of expressing disappointment in his streak ending, he noted that Twins shortstop Danny Thompson should have had the opportunity to play instead; Thompson mentioned the same thing about Killebrew. Despite not making the team, Killebrew's home run total continued to climb, and by the end of July he had Jimmie Foxx and Mickey Mantle's career marks in his sights; he went on to pass both in August. Killebrew finished the season with a .231 batting average, 26 home runs, and 74 RBIs. There were questions about Killebrew's health as the 1973 season began, as he had surgery twice during the offseason to fix leg problems. He played through the first half of the season, but an injury to his left knee on June 25 sidelined him. A month later, the injury had not cleared up, and he underwent surgery to remove some torn cartilage; he did not return to the lineup until mid-September. Killebrew played in only 69 games that season, hitting five home runs.

Fully recovered for the 1974 season, Killebrew made his mark early on, hitting two home runs in a May 5 match against the Detroit Tigers; the second was career home run number 550. In his honor, the Twins held Harmon Killebrew Day in August, when it was announced that they would retire his number; Killebrew responded by leading the Twins to a 5–4 victory over the Orioles. He finished the season with a .222 batting average, 13 home runs, and 54 RBIs. In December 1974, he was given the option of staying with the Twins as a coach and batting instructor, managing the AAA Tacoma Twins, or being released. He chose to be released, ending his 21-season tenure with the Twins.

=== Kansas City Royals (1975) ===
On January 24, 1975, eight days after getting his release from the Twins, Killebrew signed a one-year contract with the Kansas City Royals. During his return to Minnesota in early May, the Twins formally retired his No. 3 jersey. In that game, Killebrew hit a home run against his former teammates and received a standing ovation from the crowd. In 106 games with the Royals, he had a batting average of .199, 14 home runs, and 44 RBIs. At the end of the season, the Royals released Killebrew. In March 1976, he formally announced his retirement and said he would become an announcer and color commentator for Twins games. At the time of his retirement, he was fifth all-time on the home run list.

== Career overall ==
=== Statistics and achievements ===
Killebrew hit 573 home runs (12th all time), drove in 1,584 runs and had 1,559 (15th all time) bases on balls during his career. He is also the all-time home run record holder among players born in Idaho; Vance Law is second. He also finished with the record of having the most plate appearances (9,831) in his career without a sacrifice hit (since broken by Frank Thomas with 10,074 plate appearances).

Category	G	BA	AB	R	H	2B	3B	HR	RBI	BB	SO	OBP	SLG	OPS	TB	PO	A	DP	E	FLD%	Ref.
Total	2,435	.256	8,147	1,283	2,086	290	24	573	1,584	1,559	1,699	.376	.509	.884	4,143	8,849	1,963	767	215	.981	

=== Power hitting ===
Killebrew can knock the ball out of any park, including Yellowstone.

— Paul Richards, Baltimore Orioles manager, 1959.

Killebrew was known for his quick hands and exceptional upper-body strength, demonstrated by frequent "tape measure" home runs he hit in the prime of his career. Killebrew said his first home run in the Majors was his favorite, coming off Billy Hoeft at Griffith Stadium. He said of it, "Frank House was the catcher. When I came to the plate, he said, 'Kid, we're going to throw you a fastball.' I didn't know whether to believe him or not. I hit it out. It was one of the longest home runs I ever hit. As I crossed the plate, House said, 'That's the last time I ever tell you what pitch is coming.'"

On August 3, 1962, he became the first hitter ever to hit a baseball over the left field roof at Tiger Stadium, a seldom-reached target as contrasted with the old ballpark's smaller right field area. Only three others accomplished this feat during the next 37 seasons before the stadium closed. On May 24, 1964, Harmon hit the longest measured homer at Baltimore's Memorial Stadium, 471 feet (144 m) to deep left center. The ball landed in the far reaches of the bleachers. The only player to hit one completely out of the Orioles' stadium was Frank Robinson in 1966; his blast was reported as about 451 feet (137 m), or about 20 feet (6 m) less than Killebrew's. On June 3, 1967, Killebrew hit a 520-foot (158 m) home run, the longest measured home run ever hit at Metropolitan Stadium and, as of 2022, the longest in Twins history. That event is commemorated at the Mall of America in Bloomington, which includes a plaque marking home plate, and one red-painted seat from the Met which was placed at the location and elevation of the landing spot of the home run. Target Field had a statue of a Gold Glove outside Gate 34 that was exactly 520 feet (158 m) from Target Field's home plate. It was moved to another location after the Twins created the Gate 34 experience.

== Honors and legacy ==
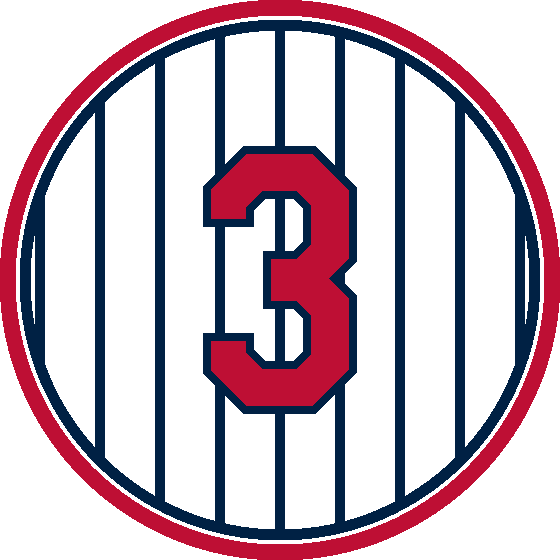
Killebrew's number 3 was retired by the Minnesota Twins in 1975.

Killebrew was first eligible for the Hall of Fame in 1981 and received 239 votes, or 59.6% of the vote; 75% of the vote is required for induction. While he did hit 573 home runs (5th all-time when he left the game), he amassed a relatively low hit total (2,086, the lowest for any 500 home run hitter at the time), given the years he played, combined with a high number of strikeouts (1699), and a .256 batting average.

In 1982, Killebrew received 59.3% of the vote, taking a backseat to Hank Aaron and Frank Robinson, who made it in their first year of eligibility. After receiving 71.9% of the vote in 1983, Killebrew said not getting in that year was more difficult to accept than the previous two times, and asked "Why do the writers feel there only has to be a certain number inducted each time?" In 1984, Killebrew received 83.1% of the vote and was elected to the Hall in his fourth year of eligibility, joining Luis Aparicio and Don Drysdale as electees.

In 2022, The Sporting News named Killebrew on their "Minneapolis Mount Rushmore of Sports", along with fellow Twin Kirby Puckett, Minnesota Timberwolves basketball player Kevin Garnett, and Minnesota Vikings football player Fran Tarkenton.

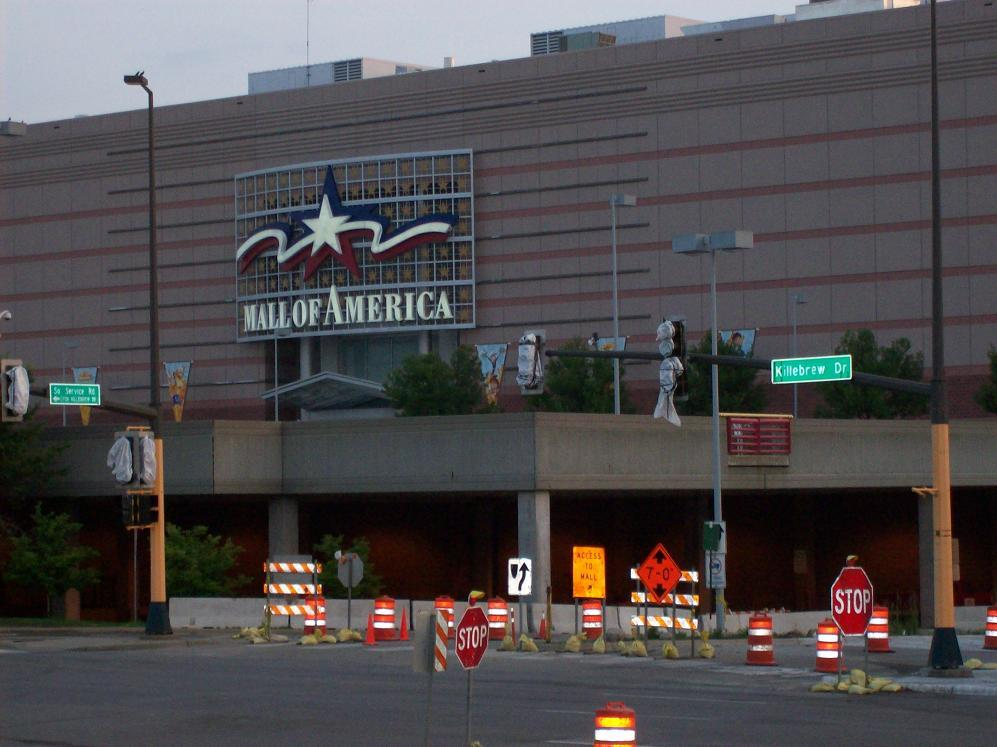
Mall of America entrance and Killebrew Drive

The street along the south side of the Mall of America, the former site of Metropolitan Stadium, in Bloomington, Minnesota, is named "Killebrew Drive" in his honor. Banners that hung above the Metrodome's outfield upper deck, resembling baseball cards, showed the retired numbers: Killebrew (3), Rod Carew (29), Tony Oliva (6), Kent Hrbek (14) and Kirby Puckett (34). In 1999, he was ranked 69th on The Sporting News list of the 100 Greatest Baseball Players and nominated as a finalist for Major League Baseball's All-Century Team. When the Twins moved to Target Field in 2010, Gate 3 on the southeast (center field) side of the stadium was named in his honor. There are also corresponding gates for the team's other retired numbers.

Despite rumors that Killebrew is the player depicted in the Major League Baseball logo, according to the creator, Jerry Dior, it was not patterned after any specific player. Killebrew is the model for the logo of the Major League Baseball Players Alumni Association, an organization he helped found in 1982.

Killebrew was known as an all-around gentleman during his playing career. "He's one of the greatest of all time." He was even noted as being kind to the umpires, as noted by Ron Luciano in his autobiography, The Umpire Strikes Back:

The Killer was one of the most feared sluggers in baseball history, but he was also one of the nicest people ever to play the game. He was one of the few players who would go out of his way to compliment umpires on a good job, even if their calls went against him. I'd call a tough strike on him and he would turn around and say approvingly, "Good call." And he was the same way in the field. And he never did this to get help on close plays, as some players do. The man hit 573 major league home runs and no umpire ever swung a bat for him.

== Post-playing career ==
Following his retirement, Killebrew was a television broadcaster for the Twins at WTCN TV from 1976 to 1978, the Oakland Athletics from 1979 to 1982, the California Angels in 1983 and back with Minnesota from 1984 to 1988. While with Oakland, he also served as a major- and minor-league hitting instructor.

Killebrew was involved in a Boise, Idaho insurance and securities business. He moved to Scottsdale, Arizona, in 1990, where he chaired the Harmon Killebrew Foundation, which he created in 1998. Killebrew founded the Danny Thompson Memorial Golf Tournament, now titled the Killebrew-Thompson Memorial in 1977 with former Idaho congressman Ralph Harding, which is played annually in mid August in Sun Valley, Idaho, and has donated more than $23 million to leukemia and cancer research. Thompson was a Twins teammate who continued his major league career while suffering from leukemia; he died in December 1976 at the age of 29.

== Personal life ==
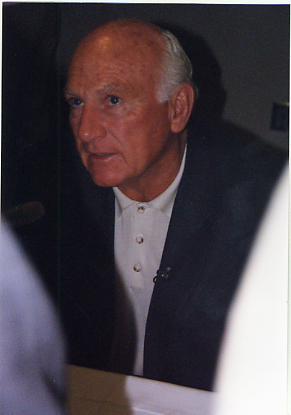
Killebrew in 2007

Despite his nicknames and style of play, Killebrew was considered by his colleagues to be a quiet, kind man. While still an active major leaguer, Killebrew became a member of the Church of Jesus Christ of Latter-day Saints and never smoked or drank. He was once asked in an interview what hobbies he had, to which he replied, "Just washing the dishes, I guess."

In the late 1980s, Killebrew had financial problems. In July 1988, his house went into foreclosure and, in 1989, the Minneapolis Star Tribune reported that he had fallen $700,000 into debt. He also divorced his first wife of more than 30 years, Elaine Killebrew née Roberts, whom he had married in 1955. Soon after, Killebrew's health failed. In May 1990, he was rushed to the hospital with a collapsed lung and damaged esophagus. Together with a subsequent abscess and staph infection, Killebrew endured three surgeries and nearly died. He used a wheelchair for some time post-surgery. By December 1990, his health had improved and he married Nita Patten.

On December 29, 2010, Killebrew announced that he had been diagnosed with esophageal cancer and started treatment. On May 13, 2011, a Minnesota Twins press release reported he was ceasing treatment and entering hospice care, because his illness had progressed beyond his doctors' expectation of cure. To honor Killebrew, the Twins wore their 1961 throwback alternate jerseys at home for the remainder of the 2011 season; he was also honored by the Washington Nationals, who hung a jersey with Killebrew's name and number 3 in their home dugout. Killebrew died on May 17, 2011, at his home in Scottsdale at the age of 74. He was interred at Riverside Cemetery in Payette, Idaho.

Following his death, Minnesota Twins president Dave St. Peter released the following statement:

No individual has ever meant more to the Minnesota Twins organization and millions of fans across Twins Territory than Harmon Killebrew. Harmon will long be remembered as one of the most prolific home run hitters in the history of the game and the leader of a group of players who helped lay the foundation for the long-term success of the Twins franchise and Major League Baseball in the Upper Midwest. However, more importantly Harmon's legacy will be the class, dignity and humility he demonstrated each and every day as a Hall of Fame-quality husband, father, friend, teammate and man.

== See also ==
- Major League Baseball titles leaders
- List of Major League Baseball home run records
- List of Major League Baseball annual home run leaders
- List of Major League Baseball annual runs batted in leaders
- List of Major League Baseball career hits leaders
- List of Major League Baseball career runs batted in leaders
- List of Major League Baseball career runs scored leaders
- List of Major League Baseball career total bases leaders
- List of Major League Baseball career bases on balls leaders
- List of baseball players who went directly to Major League Baseball

== Bibliography ==
- Allen, Bob; Bill Gilbert (2000). The 500 Home Run Club: Baseball's 16 Greatest Home Run Hitters from Babe Ruth to Mark McGwire. Champaign, Illinois: Sports Publishing. ISBN 1-58261-289-7.
- Armour, Mark L.; Daniel R. Levitt (2004). Paths to Glory: How Great Baseball Teams Got That Way. Dulles, Virginia: Brassey's. ISBN 1-57488-805-6.
- Kalb, Elliott (2005). Who's Better, Who's Best in Baseball?. New York: McGraw-Hill Professional. ISBN 0-07-144538-2.
- Leboutillier, Nate (2008). The Story of the Minnesota Twins. Mankato, Minnesota: Creative Education. ISBN 978-1-58341-493-4.
- Markoe, Arnie (2002). The Scribner Encyclopedia of American Lives. New York: Charles Scribner's Sons. ISBN 0-684-80665-7.
- Pahigian, Josh; Kevin O'Connell (2004). The Ultimate Baseball Road-trip: A Fan's Guide to Major League Stadiums. Guilford, Connecticut: Lyons Press. ISBN 1-59228-159-1.
- Porter, David L. (2000). Biographical Dictionary of American Sports. Westport, Connecticut: Greenwood Publishing Group. ISBN 0-313-31175-7.
- Rushin, Steve (2000). The Caddie Was a Reindeer: And Other Tales of Extreme Recreation. New York: Atlantic Monthly Press. ISBN 0-87113-878-6.
- Thielman, Jim (2005). Cool of the Evening: The 1965 Minnesota Twins. Minneapolis: Kirk House Publishers. ISBN 1-886513-71-6.
