= Julio Bécquer =

Cuban baseball player (1931–2020)

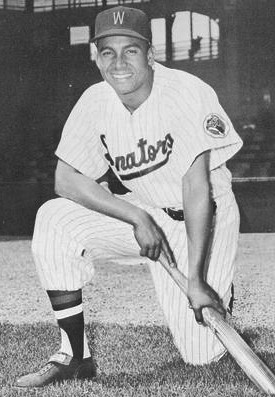
- First baseman
- Born: December 20, 1931; Havana, Cuba
- Died: November 1, 2020 (aged 88); Hopkins, Minnesota, U.S.
- Batted: Left Threw: Left

MLB debut
- September 13, 1955, for the Washington Senators

Last MLB appearance
- September 18, 1963, for the Minnesota Twins

MLB statistics
- Batting average: .244
- Home runs: 12
- Runs batted in: 114
- Stats at Baseball Reference

Teams
- Washington Senators (1955, 1957–1960); Los Angeles Angels (1961); Minnesota Twins (1961, 1963)

Julio Bécquer Villegas (December 20, 1931 – November 1, 2020) was a Cuban-born American professional baseball player, a first baseman who played in 488 games over seven seasons (1955; 1957–61; 1963) for the Washington Senators / Minnesota Twins and Los Angeles Angels of Major League Baseball. A native of Havana, he batted and threw left-handed; Bécquer stood 5 feet 11 inches (1.80 m) tall and weighed 178 pounds (81 kg) during his active career.

Bécquer attended the University of Havana. His pro baseball career began in the Washington organization in 1952 and he made his MLB debut with the Washington Senators in September 1955, getting into ten games, with one start as a first baseman, and collecting three hits in 14 at bats. He spent 1956 with the Triple-A Louisville Colonels, where he belted 15 home runs but posted only a .235 batting average. Bécquer then spent four full seasons with the Senators. Although he appeared in 100 or more games three times (1957; 1959–60) only in 1960 was he Washington's regular first baseman. That season, the last of the "original" Senators' 60 years in Washington, he set personal bests in games played (110), hits (75) and runs batted in (35). At the expansion draft that followed in December, he was left unprotected and was taken as the 49th player selected by the new Los Angeles Angels franchise.

For the 1961 Angels, Bécquer appeared in nine games as a defensive replacement and pinch hitter and went hitless in eight at bats. On May 10, with MLB teams cutting their rosters from 28 to 25 men, he was acquired by the Philadelphia Phillies' Buffalo Bisons Triple-A affiliate. Bécquer never appeared for the Phils at the Major League level; instead, on June 2 he was sold to his original MLB team, renamed the Minnesota Twins, where he appeared in 57 games, 18 at first base, and batted .238 with five home runs, a career high. On July 4, 1961, he hit a pinch hit, walk-off grand slam home run off Warren Hacker of the Chicago White Sox on a 1–1 count with two outs in the bottom of the ninth inning.

Bécquer spent all of 1962, and most of 1963, in minor league baseball. But late in the 1963 campaign, Calvin Griffith, the president and majority owner of the Twins, purchased Bécquer's contract from the Mexican League and placed him on the Twins' roster so that he could qualify for his MLB pension. Bécquer's only big-league appearance in 1963, his last in the majors, came when he pinch-ran for catcher Earl Battey September 18, and scored his final MLB run. Altogether, Bécquer notched 238 hits, including 37 doubles, 16 triples, 12 homers and 114 RBI, batting .244 lifetime. He finished his career with a .993 fielding percentage at first base.

Bécquer retired from the game after the 1964 minor-league season and lived in Minneapolis. He died from COVID-19 at an assisted living facility in Hopkins, on November 1, 2020, at the age of 88.
