= 1963 in baseball =

The following are the baseball events of the year 1963 throughout the world.

== Champions ==
=== Major League Baseball ===
- World Series: Los Angeles Dodgers beat New York Yankees (4–0); Sandy Koufax, MVP
- All-Star Game, July 9 at Municipal Stadium: National League, 5–3; Willie Mays, MVP

=== Other champions ===
- College World Series: USC
- Japan Series: Yomiuri Giants over Nishitetsu Lions (4–3)
- Little League World Series: Granada Hills National, Granada Hills, California
- Senior League World Series: Monterrey, Mexico
- Pan American Games: Cuba over United States

== Awards and honors ==
- Baseball Hall of Fame
  - John Clarkson
  - Elmer Flick
  - Sam Rice
  - Eppa Rixey

Baseball Writers' Association of America Awards
BBWAA Award	National League	American League
Rookie of the Year	Pete Rose (CIN)	Gary Peters (CWS)
Cy Young Award	Sandy Koufax (LAD)	—
Most Valuable Player	Sandy Koufax (LAD)	Elston Howard (NYY)
Gold Glove Awards
Position	National League	American League
Pitcher	Bobby Shantz (STL)	Jim Kaat (MIN)
Catcher	Johnny Edwards (CIN)	Elston Howard (NYY)
1st Base	Bill White (STL)	Vic Power (MIN)
2nd Base	Bill Mazeroski (PIT)	Bobby Richardson (NYY)
3rd Base	Ken Boyer (STL)	Brooks Robinson (BAL)
Shortstop	Bobby Wine (PHI)	Zoilo Versalles (MIN)
Outfield	Roberto Clemente (PIT)	Jim Landis (CWS)
Outfield	Curt Flood (STL)	Al Kaline (DET)
Outfield	Willie Mays (SF)	Carl Yastrzemski (BOS)

== Statistical leaders ==
Hall of Famer Sandy Koufax

	American League		National League	
Stat	Player	Total	Player	Total
AVG	Carl Yastrzemski (BOS)	.321	Tommy Davis (LAD)	.326
HR	Harmon Killebrew (MIN)	45	Hank Aaron (MIL); Willie McCovey (SF)	44
RBI	Dick Stuart (BOS)	118	Hank Aaron (MIL)	130
W	Whitey Ford (NYY)	24	Sandy Koufax^{1} (LAD); Juan Marichal (SF)	25
ERA	Gary Peters (CWS)	2.33	Sandy Koufax^{1} (LAD)	1.88
K	Camilo Pascual (MIN)	202	Sandy Koufax^{1} (LAD)	306

^{1} Major league Triple Crown pitching winner

== Major league baseball final standings ==
=== American League final standings ===
American League
Team	W	L	Pct.	GB	Home	Road
New York Yankees	104	57	.646	—	58‍–‍22	46‍–‍35
Chicago White Sox	94	68	.580	10½	49‍–‍33	45‍–‍35
Minnesota Twins	91	70	.565	13	48‍–‍33	43‍–‍37
Baltimore Orioles	86	76	.531	18½	48‍–‍33	38‍–‍43
Cleveland Indians	79	83	.488	25½	41‍–‍40	38‍–‍43
Detroit Tigers	79	83	.488	25½	47‍–‍34	32‍–‍49
Boston Red Sox	76	85	.472	28	44‍–‍36	32‍–‍49
Kansas City Athletics	73	89	.451	31½	36‍–‍45	37‍–‍44
Los Angeles Angels	70	91	.435	34	39‍–‍42	31‍–‍49
Washington Senators	56	106	.346	48½	31‍–‍49	25‍–‍57

Locations of teams for the 1962–1964 American League seasons
American League

=== National League final standings ===
National League
Team	W	L	Pct.	GB	Home	Road
Los Angeles Dodgers	99	63	.611	—	50‍–‍31	49‍–‍32
St. Louis Cardinals	93	69	.574	6	53‍–‍28	40‍–‍41
San Francisco Giants	88	74	.543	11	50‍–‍31	38‍–‍43
Philadelphia Phillies	87	75	.537	12	45‍–‍36	42‍–‍39
Cincinnati Reds	86	76	.531	13	46‍–‍35	40‍–‍41
Milwaukee Braves	84	78	.519	15	45‍–‍36	39‍–‍42
Chicago Cubs	82	80	.506	17	43‍–‍38	39‍–‍42
Pittsburgh Pirates	74	88	.457	25	42‍–‍39	32‍–‍49
Houston Colt .45s	66	96	.407	33	44‍–‍37	22‍–‍59
New York Mets	51	111	.315	48	34‍–‍47	17‍–‍64

Locations of teams for the 1962–1963 National League seasons
National League

== Nippon Professional Baseball final standings ==
=== Central League final standings ===
Central League	G	W	L	T	Pct.	GB
Yomiuri Giants	140	83	55	2	.601	—
Chunichi Dragons	140	80	57	3	.584	2.5
Hanshin Tigers	140	69	70	1	.496	14.5
Kokutetsu Swallows	140	65	73	2	.471	18.0
Taiyo Whales	140	59	79	2	.428	24.0
Hiroshima Carp	140	58	80	2	.420	25.0

=== Pacific League final standings ===
Pacific League	G	W	L	T	Pct.	GB
Nishitetsu Lions	150	86	60	4	.589	—
Nankai Hawks	150	85	61	4	.582	1.0
Toei Flyers	150	76	71	3	.517	10.5
Kintetsu Buffaloes	150	74	73	3	.503	12.5
Daimai Orions	150	64	85	1	.430	23.5
Hankyu Braves	150	57	92	1	.383	30.5

== Events ==
=== January ===
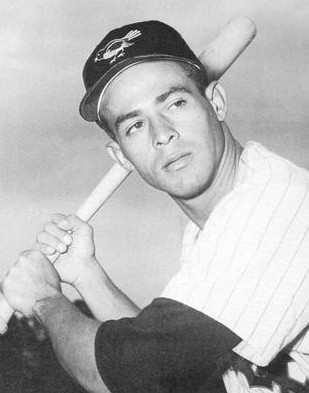
Luis Aparicio wearing Oriole cap and ChiSox uniform

- January 5 – The National League's greatest hitter of the modern era, Rogers Hornsby, suffers a fatal heart attack at age 66. [See Deaths below.]
- January 10 – Chicago Cubs owner Philip K. Wrigley, who two years ago invented the "College of Coaches" to replace baseball's traditional field-manager-led on-field hierarchy, today creates the position of athletic director, and names ex-Air Force Academy athletics director Robert V. Whitlow to the post. But Whitlow's lack of baseball experience leads to him being ignored by general manager John Holland and the Cubs' coaching staff; he resigns in January 1965 and his position is abolished.
- January 14 – The Baltimore Orioles and Chicago White Sox pull off a blockbuster trade. Baltimore obtains future Baseball Hall of Fame shortstop Luis Aparicio and veteran outfielder Al Smith in exchange for Cooperstown-bound knuckleballer Hoyt Wilhelm, shortstop Ron Hansen (the 1960 American League Rookie of the Year), third baseman Pete Ward and outfielder Dave Nicholson. The White Sox gain, in Wilhelm, a shutdown relief pitcher, as well as three regulars; meanwhile, Aparicio will help the Orioles break through to a World Series championship in 1966.
- January 24 – The Los Angeles Dodgers acquire Don Zimmer from the Cincinnati Reds in exchange for minor league pitcher Scott Breeden. Infielder Zimmer previously played for the Dodgers from 1954 to 1959.
- January 27 – Sam Rice, Eppa Rixey, Elmer Flick and John Clarkson are elected to the Hall of Fame by the Special Veterans Committee.
- January 29 – Elwood "Pete" Quesada divests himself of his majority stake in the Washington Senators, and James Johnston and James Lemon become co-owners of the two-year-old expansion team. Johnston and Lemon hire former New York Yankees outfielder George Selkirk as their new general manager, replacing Ed Doherty.

=== February ===
- February 7 – The Kansas City Athletics sign pitcher Marcel Lachemann, who becomes known as a manager and pitching coach after his playing days.
- February 14 – New York Yankees southpaw relief pitcher Marshall Bridges (8–4 with 18 saves in 52 games pitched in 1962) is wounded in the left calf by a gun-wielding woman in an after-hours incident at a Fort Lauderdale bar. Known as "Fox" and "The Sheriff," Bridges, 31, will recover in time to appear in his first 1963 contest for the Bombers on April 20.
- February 18 – Commissioner of Baseball Ford Frick publicly opposes interleague play; the American League reportedly favors the idea, but the National League, currently considered the stronger of the two circuits, rejects it. "I have always maintained that the two leagues should keep themselves as far apart as possible," says Frick, a former NL president. He does, however, predict expansion and two 12-team leagues, each split into two divisions, which will become reality in 1969.
- February 20 – On the eve of spring training and Year 3 of the Chicago Cubs' "College of Coaches" era, owner Philip K. Wrigley appoints former American League outfielder/third baseman and native Chicagoan Bob Kennedy "head coach." But in a departure from the coaching rotations of 1961–1962, it is announced that Kennedy is expected to serve in the post for the full 1963 season. In fact, Kennedy leads the Cubs to an 82–80 mark, their first above-.500 season since 1946, and will hold the head coaching job through June 13, 1965.
- February 27 – The Kansas City Athletics trade right-hander Jerry Walker to the Cleveland Indians for outfielder Chuck Essegian. Walker, 24, is a former member of the "Kiddie Corps"—mostly "bonus-baby" pitchers of the Baltimore Orioles. His brief MLB playing career (which ends in 1964) will be superseded by a 40+ year tenure as a pitching coach and front-office executive.

=== March ===
- March 8 – The second-year New York Mets, who finished last in the National League with a 40–120 record in their inaugural season, release veteran Gene Woodling, closing the book on the outfielder's playing career. Known as a key member of five of Casey Stengel's championship New York Yankees teams (1949–1953), Woodling, 40, batted .274 in 81 games for the Mets in 1962.
- March 14 – The Los Angeles Angels sell the contract of fireballing relief pitcher Ryne Duren to the Philadelphia Phillies. Duren, 34, will win six games and save two others for the 1963 Phils.
- March 18 – The Washington Senators purchase the contract of veteran right-hander Ron Kline, 31, from the Detroit Tigers.
- March 22 – The New York Mets purchase pitcher Carl Willey from the Milwaukee Braves. Willey will attempt to boost a pitching rotation that includes Roger Craig, Al Jackson and Tracy Stallard.
- March 25 – The Philadelphia Phillies further strengthen their bullpen by acquiring Johnny Klippstein from the Cincinnati Reds in a cash transaction. Veteran righty Klippstein, 35, will post a stellar 1.93 earned run average in 1963, his 14th MLB season.
- March 28 – After less than three years in their organization, 1960 bonus baby Danny Murphy is dealt by the Chicago Cubs to the Houston Colt .45s, along with pitcher Dave Gerard, for pitchers Hal Haydel and Dick LeMay and catcher Merritt Ranew. Murphy, 20, currently an outfielder, signed a $100,000 contract after his high school graduation, but batted only .171 in three brief trials as a Cub; he will convert to the mound in 1965 and when he finally returns to the majors in 1969 it will be as a relief pitcher.

=== April ===
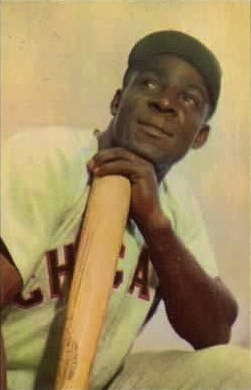
Minnie Miñoso in 1953

- April 1 – The New York Mets purchase the contract of outfielder Duke Snider from the Los Angeles Dodgers. Future Hall of Famer Snider, 36, is one of the most celebrated stars of the Brooklyn Dodgers' 1950s National League dynasty.
- April 2 – Another veteran outfielder and future Hall of Famer, Minnie Miñoso, changes teams when the St. Louis Cardinals ship the 39-year-old to the Washington Senators. Miñoso's lone season as a Redbird was ruined by a fractured wrist, limiting him to only 39 games.
- April 4 – The Pittsburgh Pirates and Houston Colt .45s swap outfielders, with Pittsburgh obtaining Manny Mota for Howie Goss. Mota, 24, will establish himself as a major-leaguer after the Pirates recall him from Triple-A in July, and go on to play into 1982 while setting pinch-hitting records.
- April 8:
  - In the seventh inning of the National League's traditional Opening Day contest at Cincinnati's Crosley Field, Reds southpaw Jim O'Toole commits the first balk of the 1963 season with the slow-running Bob Bailey of the Pittsburgh Pirates on first base. Two batters later, Bailey scores an inconsequential run in O'Toole's 5–2 complete-game victory. But the balk call signals an approaching controversy: prior to the season, NL president Warren Giles has instructed umpires to strictly enforce Rule 8.05(m), which demands that pitchers stop their motions for a full second with a runner on base; as a result, 96 balks will be called in the Senior Circuit over the next four weeks.
  - Second-inning home runs by Jim Gentile and Boog Powell power the Baltimore Orioles to a 3–1 win over the Washington Senators in the American League's traditional Presidential Opener before 43,022 at District of Columbia Stadium. Steve Barber goes eight innings for the victory. John F. Kennedy throws out the first ball.
  - The Detroit Tigers acquire pitcher Denny McLain, 19, off first-year waivers from the Chicago White Sox.
- April 11:
  - Warren Spahn of the Milwaukee Braves becomes the all-time winningest left-handed pitcher in Major League Baseball history. His 6–1 victory over the New York Mets gives him 328 career wins, moving him ahead of Eddie Plank, star southpaw of the early-century Philadelphia Athletics. Except for Duke Snider's home run in today's game, no Met gets past second base.
  - In his third American League game since being acquired over the winter from the Pittsburgh Pirates, catcher Don Leppert of the Washington Senators slugs three home runs against the Boston Red Sox, leading his team to an 8–0 rout at D.C. Stadium. His battery-mate, Tom Cheney, fires a one-hitter (a fourth-inning single by Eddie Bressoud) and fans ten. Leppert is one of seven batters who will enjoy three-homer days in 1963; Cheney's one-hitter is the first of ten one-hitters thrown in MLB this year.
- April 13 – After 11 hitless at bats, Cincinnati Reds second baseman Pete Rose records his first major league hit, a triple off Pittsburgh Pirates pitcher Bob Friend. The NL's mandated enforcement of the balk rule produces a major-league record seven in the Pirates' 12–4 trouncing of the Reds at Crosley Field. Friend commits four of the balks; Cincinnati's John Tsitouris (two) and Jim O'Toole (one) are guilty of the rest.
- April 21 – The New York Yankees acquire southpaw relief pitcher Steve Hamilton from the Washington Senators for right-handed reliever Jim Coates.
- April 29 – The Baltimore Orioles claim 18-year-old outfielder Curt Blefary from the New York Yankees on first-year waivers. He will win the 1965 American League Rookie of the Year Award.

=== May ===
- May 2 – The Minnesota Twins trade left-hander Jack Kralick to the Cleveland Indians for right-hander Jim Perry. Gaylord Perry's elder sibling, Jim will win 128 games over a decade in a Minnesota uniform, with two 20-game-winning seasons. Perry also will capture the 1970 American League Cy Young Award.
- May 4:
  - The National League's balk craze reaches its peak when umpires call five balks on Milwaukee Braves right-hander Bob Shaw in 41/3 innings pitched in a 7–5 Chicago Cubs victory at County Stadium. A rattled Shaw also walks six hitters and is ejected by arbiter Al Barlick after facing only 25 batters. His five balks set an MLB record, and when a sixth infraction is called on reliever Denny Lemaster in the eighth, Milwaukee establishes a new all-time MLB record for most balks by a team in a single game; when Chicago's Paul Toth also commits the same offense, the two clubs tie the record of most balks (seven) in one game, set only three weeks ago.
  - At the Polo Grounds, the Giants—who abandoned the Manhattan ballyard six years ago for San Francisco—make themselves right at home, scoring an NL-season-high 17 runs and bashing six homers in thrashing the New York Mets 17–4. Orlando Cepeda (four RBI) and Ed Bailey (three RBI) each hit two long balls; Jim Davenport drives in five runs and adds a homer himself.
- May 5 – The Detroit Tigers release veteran first baseman and pinch hitter Vic Wertz, 38, who later signs with the Minnesota Twins to close out his 17-year career.
- May 7 – Reacting to the spate of balks called in the National League this season—96 in less than a month—Commissioner Ford Frick, NL president Warren Giles and American League boss Joe Cronin meet in emergency session to simplify Rule 8.05m. While insisting on pitchers' coming to a full stop when a runner is on base, the new rule removes the "one second" minimum stipulation. Under the re-written rule, 51 balks will be called for the last five months of the NL campaign.
- May 9 – Chicago Cubs first baseman Ernie Banks becomes the first National League player to record 22 putouts in a game, during a 3–1 victory over the Pittsburgh Pirates.
- May 11 – At Dodger Stadium, Sandy Koufax of the Los Angeles Dodgers no-hits the San Francisco Giants 8–0, his second no-hitter in as many seasons. He walks two, fans four, and faces 28 hitters, one over the minimum. The final out is made by Harvey Kuenn on a ground ball back to than Koufax. Kuenn will also make the final out of Koufax's perfect game two years later.
- May 14 – Veteran right-hander Ray Herbert of the Chicago White Sox fires his fourth straight complete-game shutout, defeating the Detroit Tigers 3–0 at Comiskey Park. The 33-year-old, a 20-game winner in 1962, gives up a total of 15 hits and three walks during the four-game stretch, which began May 1. Herbert's scoreless-innings-pitched streak will reach 38 innings, best in MLB in 1963, before it's snapped by the Baltimore Orioles on May 19 in the third frame.
- May 17 – Houston Colt .45s pitcher Don Nottebart throws the first no-hitter in franchise history, leading his team past the Philadelphia Phillies, 4–1, at Colt Stadium. The 27-year-old right-hander allows three bases on balls and fans eight; the Phils' run is unearned.
- May 19 – Detroit Tigers center fielder Bill Bruton ties a major league record for most doubles—four—in a single game. Bruton hits his four two-baggers in consecutive plate appearances, as Detroit defeats the Washington Senators, 5–1. Teammate and rookie pitcher Bill Faul tosses a three-hitter in his first major league start.
- May 21 – Jim Maloney, the Cincinnati Reds' flame-throwing 22-year-old, strikes out 16 Milwaukee Braves in 81/3 innings in today's 2–0 road victory—the most strikeouts recorded in a 1963 contest in the majors.
- May 23:
  - The New York Mets trade first baseman Gil Hodges to the Washington Senators for outfielder Jimmy Piersall. Hodges, 39, immediately retires as an active player and replaces Mickey Vernon as Washington's manager. He will pilot the Senators through 1967, then return to the Mets as their manager in 1968.
  - The Cincinnati Reds trade ace pinch-hitter and reserve outfielder Jerry Lynch to the Pittsburgh Pirates for outfielder Bob Skinner.
- May 25 – The Kansas City Athletics trade shortstop Dick Howser and catcher Joe Azcue to the Cleveland Indians for catcher Doc Edwards and $100,000.

=== June ===
- June 2 – At Busch Stadium, Willie Mays hits three home runs off three different pitchers (Ernie Broglio, Bob Humphreys and Bobby Shantz), helping the San Francisco Giants beat the St. Louis Cardinals 6–4.
- June 6 – The New York Mets sign shortstop Bud Harrelson, 19, as an amateur free agent out of San Francisco State University.
- June 9 – Ernie Banks hits three home runs but his Chicago Cubs lose to the Los Angeles Dodgers 11–8.
- June 10 – Al Kaline belts his 200th career home run helping the Detroit Tigers beat the Boston Red Sox 6–1.
- June 11 – Bob Aspromonte clouts a walk-off grand slam in the tenth inning off pitcher Lindy McDaniel to give the Houston Colt .45s a 6–2 victory over the Chicago Cubs at Colt Stadium.
- June 14:
  - The New York Mets' Duke Snider hits his 400th career home run off Bob Purkey in the first inning of the Mets' 10–3 victory over the Cincinnati Reds at Crosley Field.
  - Willie Kirkland of the Cleveland Indians hits a home run in the 11th inning to tie the game 2–2. In the 19th inning, he hits the game-winning home run to defeat the Washington Senators. Kirkland joins Vern Stephens as the only player to hit two extra-inning home runs. The contest is the majors' longest, as measured in innings, of 1963.

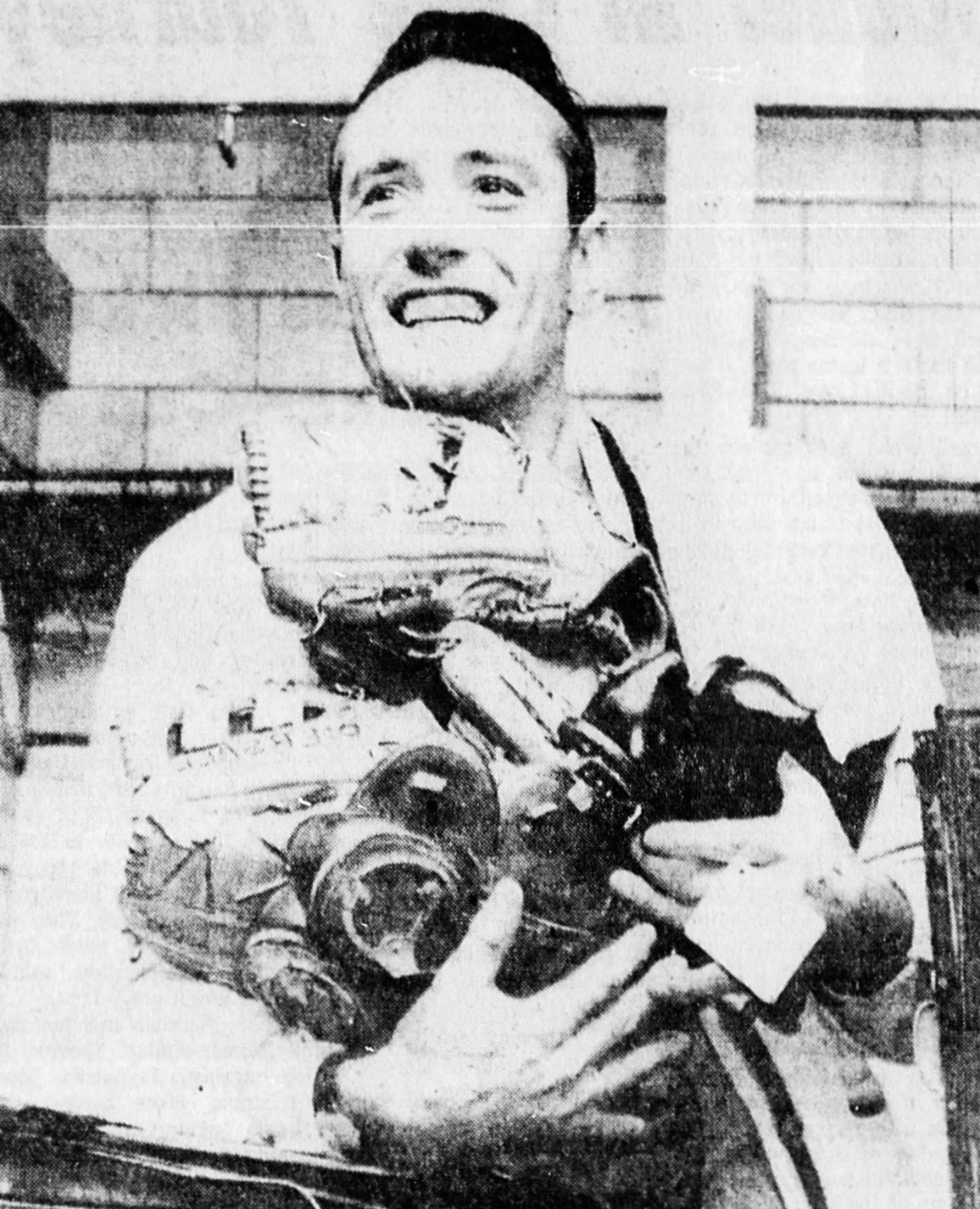
Jimmy Piersall in 1963

- June 15:
  - At Candlestick Park, Juan Marichal of the San Francisco Giants no-hits the Houston Colt .45s, 1–0, becoming the first Latin American pitcher to throw a no-hitter. The no-hitter is the first by a Giant since the franchise's move from New York City after the 1957 season. Moreover, Marichal joins Carl Hubbell, who did it while pitching for the New York York Giants in 1929, as the second Giants pitcher to accomplish the feat.
  - An era ends for the Milwaukee Braves when they trade 36-year-old right-hander Lew Burdette to the St. Louis Cardinals for catcher/outfielder Gene Oliver and young hurler Bob Sadowski. A three-time All-Star, Burdette had formed a formidable one-two pitching tandem with southpaw Warren Spahn since the Braves moved to Wisconsin in 1953, and had carried the team to its 1957 World Series championship with three complete-game victories.
  - The Detroit Tigers reacquire outfielder George Thomas from the Los Angeles Angels for pitcher Paul Foytack and infielder Frank Kostro. Thomas, 25, is an ex-"bonus baby" who broke into pro ball with the 1957 Tigers.
- June 18 – Veteran manager Chuck Dressen is called back into harness when he replaces Bob Scheffing as pilot of the struggling Detroit Tigers, who are 24–36 and 11½ games from first place. For Dressen, 68, the Tigers' job represents his fifth MLB managerial assignment since 1934.
- June 21 – Pitcher Early Wynn, 43, in search of his 300th career victory, returns to the Cleveland Indians as a free agent. He had been released by the Chicago White Sox on November 20, 1962.
- June 23 – Colorful Jimmy Piersall hits his 100th career home run in a 5–0 New York Mets victory over the Philadelphia Phillies at the Polo Grounds. In celebration, he runs backwards around the bases (although he touches each bag in the correct, counter-clockwise order); still photos of the stunt make coast-to-coast news but Piersall draws scorn from baseball traditionalists.
- June 24 – The St. Louis Cardinals acquire knuckle-balling reliever Barney Schultz, a 36-year-old journeyman, from the Chicago Cubs. In 1964, Schultz will record saves in 11 straight appearances between September 15 and October 4, playing a major role in the Redbirds' successful late-season pennant drive.
- June 27:
  - Johnny Callison, the Philadelphia Phillies' 24-year-old All-Star outfielder, hits for the cycle against the Pittsburgh Pirates in a 13–4 Philadelphia victory at Forbes Field. It's one of two "cycles" in the majors in 1963. Callison's four runs batted in help Phillies' rookie right-hander Ray Culp win his tenth game of the year.
  - In a sparsely attended, weekday-afternoon game, right-fielder Al Luplow of the Cleveland Indians makes one of the most spectacular catches in Fenway Park history, catching Dick Williams' long drive as he leaps over the fence and tumbles into the Boston Red Sox' bullpen. The catch comes in the eighth inning with the tying runs on base, and preserves the Tribe's 6–4 victory over Boston.
- June 30 – The Los Angeles Angels sign 17-year-old outfielder Jay Johnstone as a free agent.

=== July ===
- July 1:
  - The Cincinnati Reds make two trades. They send Don Blasingame to the Washington Senators for reliever Jim Coates. Blasingame, a 31-year-old former NL All-Star, has lost his second-base job to the Reds' standout rookie, Pete Rose. The Reds also deal catcher Jesse Gonder to the New York Mets for catcher Sammy Taylor and infielder Charlie Neal.
  - The Kansas City Athletics purchase the contract of catcher/pinch hitter Charley Lau from the Baltimore Orioles.
- July 2 – The San Francisco Giants' Juan Marichal pitches a 16-inning shutout against the Milwaukee Braves, outdueling Warren Spahn, who hurls 15 1/3 scoreless innings before Willie Mays wins the contest 1–0 with a home run in the bottom of the 16th. In the ninth inning, when the Giants' manager suggests Marichal should come out for a pinch hitter, he angrily replies, "I am not going to come out of that game as long as that old man is still pitching." Later, when the Braves' manager suggests to Spahn that it's time he leaves the game, the 42-year-old Spahn replies that if that young kid can still pitch, so can he. When it's over, Marichal has thrown 227 pitches and Spahn 201.
- July 7 – The All-Star break sees two clear league leaders at the season's midpoint: the New York Yankees (50–31), who boast a five-game advantage over the Chicago White Sox (47–38); and the Los Angeles Dodgers (50–33), up by three lengths over the defending NL champions, the rival Giants (48–37).
- July 9 – At Cleveland Municipal Stadium, the National League defeats the American League 5–3 in the 1963 Major League Baseball All–Star Game, as the annual Midsummer Classic returns to a single-game format. The Americans out-hit the Nationals 11–6, but MVP Willie Mays puts on a one-man show. Although he's held to a single, Mays collects two runs, two RBI and two stolen bases, and makes a running catch that deprives Joe Pepitone of an extra base hit in the eighth inning. The game marks the 24th and final All-Star appearance of Stan Musial, who pinch hits in the fifth inning. He lines out to right field, leaving behind a .317 batting average (20-for-63) and an All-Star Game record of six home runs.

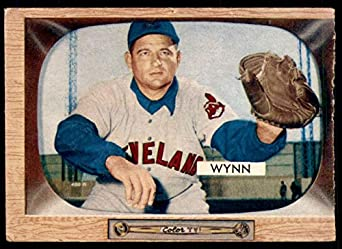
Early Wynn in 1955

- July 13 – Cleveland Indians pitcher Early Wynn finally wins his 300th game thanks to a little help from his bullpen. After going winless in six straight starts dating to September 1962, then struggling through five innings against the Kansas City Athletics today, Wynn, 43, is replaced by relief man Jerry Walker, whose four scoreless frames save the future Hall of Famer's 7–4 triumph.
- July 27 – The Los Angeles Angels sign outfielder Jim Piersall the same day he is unconditionally released by the New York Mets. Piersall, 33, will continue his MLB career as a backup outfielder with the Angels until he's released on May 2, 1967.
- July 30 – In one in a series of trades the Los Angeles Dodgers will make with the Washington Senators, the Dodgers send their ace 1962 right-handed relief pitcher, Ed Roebuck, to Washington for infielder Marv Breeding. On June 24, Los Angeles had sold the contract of veteran infielder Don Zimmer to the Senators. The two teams have become interleague trading partners since ex-Dodger standout Gil Hodges became Washington's manager earlier this season.
- July 31 – A gathering of 7,288 at Cleveland Stadium watches Indians infielder Woodie Held, pitcher Pedro Ramos, outfielder Tito Francona, and shortstop Larry Brown slug four straight solo home runs off Los Angeles Angels right-hander Paul Foytack in the bottom of the sixth inning. The four homers build the Indians' lead to 9–1, and they win, 9–5.

=== August ===
- August 7 – The New York Mets defeat the St. Louis Cardinals, 7–3. Mets outfielder Jim Hickman hits for the cycle, doing it in order. Both are firsts for the Mets.
- August 9 – Jim Hickman becomes the second player to hit a walk-off grand slam against Chicago Cubs pitcher Lindy McDaniel this season, in a 7–3 New York Mets victory at the Polo Grounds. Hickman's blow enables teammate Roger Craig (3–20) to break a personal 18-game losing steak that dates to May 4. McDaniel—who previously surrendered a game-ending slam to Bob Aspromonte of the Houston Colt .45s on June 11—is the second MLB pitcher to be so victimized in one season, joining Satchel Paige (1952).
- August 16 – The Baltimore Orioles sign 17-year-old free agent pitcher Jim Palmer, a recent graduate of a Scottsdale, Arizona, high school.
- August 27 – Willie Mays hits his 400th career home run helping the San Francisco Giants beat the St. Louis Cardinals 7–2.
- August 23
  - Milwaukee Braves veteran pitcher Warren Spahn sets a National League record for most starts, previously set by Grover Alexander, with his 601st appearance on the mound during a 6–1 win over the Los Angeles Dodgers. Later in 1963, Spahn will match an NL record set by Christy Mathewson with his thirteenth 20-win season, while becoming the oldest pitcher to do so at 42.
  - Two lopsided American League games see the winning side each score 17 runs. At D.C. Stadium, the visiting Los Angeles Angels trounce the Washington Senators 17–0; Ken McBride throws a three-hit shutout and knocks in two runs himself. At Tiger Stadium, host Detroit pummels the Kansas City Athletics 17–2; veteran Frank Lary throws a complete game and Norm Cash slugs two home runs. The 17 runs scored in each game are the most in an AL game this season.
- August 29 – Helped by a league-record-tying eight home runs, the Minnesota Twins amass a team-record forty-seven total bases in the first game of a double-header at D.C. Stadium. Harmon Killebrew and Vic Power both strike for two homers in the 14–2 victory. In the second game, a 10–1 Minnesota win, the Twins hit four more homers for a team-record even dozen on the day.

=== September ===
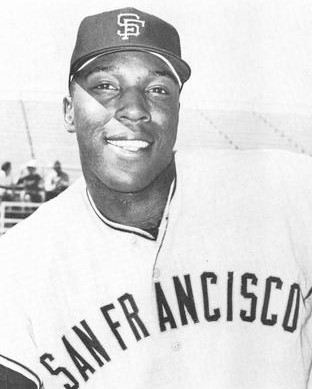
Willie McCovey

- September 2 – The conclusion of Labor Day weekend ends with the two seemingly decided pennant races. In the American League, the New York Yankees (90–48) have increased their advantage to 12 games over the Chicago White Sox (78–60); in the National League, the Los Angeles Dodgers (83–54) hold a less-comfortable six-game margin over their nearest pursuer, the St. Louis Cardinals (77–60).
- September 5 – Willie McCovey hits his 100th career home run.
- September 6 – Major League Baseball celebrates its 100,000th game with a match-up between the Cleveland Indians and the Washington Senators at D.C. Stadium.
- September 10 – The Alous become the first brother trio to bat consecutively in one game, during the eighth inning of a San Francisco Giants' 4–2 loss to the New York Mets at the Polo Grounds. Jesús pinch-hits in his Major League debut and grounds out to shortstop Al Moran; Matty, also pinch-hitting, strikes out, and Felipe ends the inning by grounding out to pitcher Carl Willey, who goes the distance for the victory.
- September 13 – The New York Yankees beat the Minnesota Twins 2–0 to clinch their 28th American League pennant.
- September 15:
  - The red-hot St. Louis Cardinals, now 91–61, win their 19th game in their last 20, sweeping a twin bill against the Milwaukee Braves by taking the second game, 5–0, at Busch Stadium behind Ray Sadecki's five-hitter. Since August 30, when the streak began, the Cards have leapfrogged the San Francisco Giants to move into second place in the NL and made up 6½ games on the front-running Los Angeles Dodgers (91–59), whom they now trail by only one game, two in the loss column. The Cardinals and Dodgers will square off in a three-game series tomorrow in St. Louis with the pennant on the line.
  - All three Alou brothers—Felipe, Matty and Jesus—play in the outfield for the Giants in a 15–3 victory over the Pittsburgh Pirates.
- September 18:
  - Playing in his first MLB game, Los Angeles Dodgers first baseman Dick Nen clubs a ninth-inning, game-tying home run over the roof at Busch Stadium off Ron Taylor of the St. Louis Cardinals. The Dodgers go on to win in the 13th, 6–5, completing a three-game road sweep of the Redbirds and effectively wrecking St. Louis' pennant drive.
  - In the final regular-season game ever played at the Polo Grounds, the Philadelphia Phillies defeat the New York Mets 6–1. New York gets its only run on Jim Hickman's fourth-inning home run, the last home run to be hit at Upper Manhattan's venerable stadium.
- September 21 – Harmon Killebrew, in a double-header split between his Minnesota Twins and the Boston Red Sox at Fenway Park, hits four home runs on the day to tie an American League record.
- September 22:
  - Willie McCovey hits three home runs to help San Francisco Giants beat the New York Mets 13–4.
  - Outfielder Jimmie Hall of the Minnesota Twins hits his 33rd and final home run of the year. No other rookie without previous-year at bats has hit more. Hall tops the current record-holder, Boston's Ted Williams, who hit 31 in 1939.
- September 24 – Don Drysdale gains his 19th victory of the year and the Dodgers win their second West Coast pennant, defeating the New York Mets 4–1 at Los Angeles. Meanwhile, the second-place St. Louis Cardinals drop a 6–3 decision to the Chicago Cubs at Wrigley Field. The 1963 World Series will match the Dodgers against the New York Yankees for the eighth time since 1941 and the first time since 1956 when they represented Brooklyn.
- September 27 – Manager Harry Craft of the Houston Colt .45s fields the "Baby Colts", a starting lineup with an average age of nineteen years, against the New York Mets at Colt Stadium. The oldest player used by Houston all game is 26-year-old Dick Drott, who pitches the ninth inning.
- September 28 – Minnesota Twins first baseman Vic Power hits the club's 225th home run of 1963, a season total that ranks second behind the 1961 New York Yankees' 240.
- September 29:
  - Stan Musial's RBI single off Cincinnati Reds pitcher Jim Maloney is his 3,630th hit (then a National League record) in the final at-bat of his 22-year major league career spent entirely with the St. Louis Cardinals; his Redbirds go on to defeat the Reds 3–2.
  - John Paciorek makes his MLB debut for the Houston Colt .45s at age 18, lashing three hits, driving in four runs, and drawing two walks. He reaches base in all five plate appearances for a batting average of 1.000 and an OPS of 2.000. However, this will be Paciorek's only appearance in a major league game, after he suffers an injury in the minors that ends his career by the time he's 24.
- September 30 – The off-season, and trade season, begin for the 18 clubs not playing in the upcoming World Series. In the first major transaction, the Cleveland Indians purchase the contract of 33-year-old relief pitcher Don McMahon from the Houston Colt .45s.

=== October ===
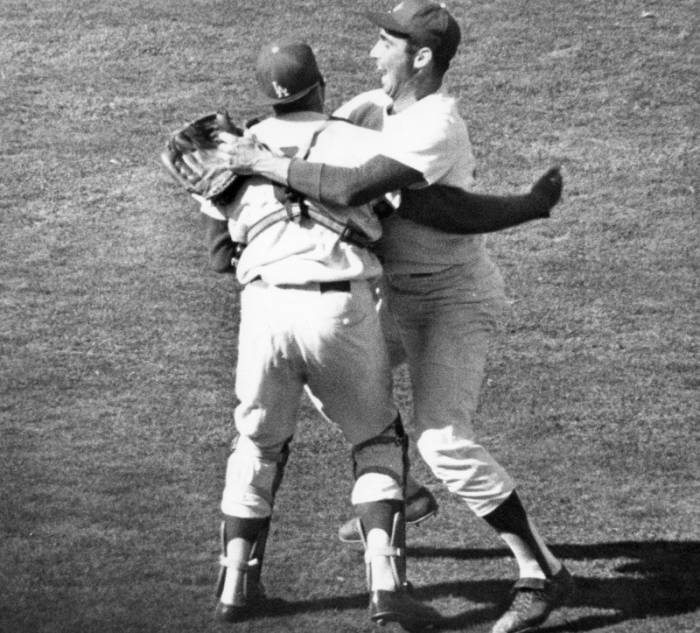
John Roseboro and Sandy Koufax celebrate the Dodgers' sweep of the 1963 World Series

- October 2 – In Game 1 of the 1964 World Series—and his first and only official appearance on the Yankee Stadium mound—ace southpaw Sandy Koufax sets a new Fall Classic record, striking out 15 (breaking ex-teammate Carl Erskine's ten-year old mark), and giving his Los Angeles Dodgers the jump on the New York Yankees with a 5–2 victory. The Dodgers' four-run second inning, keyed by a mammoth Frank Howard drive over Mickey Mantle's head in centerfield (it lands for a double), an RBI single by ex-Yankee Bill Skowron, and a three-run homer from catcher John Roseboro, provides all the support Koufax needs; he holds the Yanks off the scoreboard until Tom Tresh reaches him for a two-run homer in the eighth, allows six hits, and walks three in his complete-game triumph.
- October 4 – Among the veteran players receiving career-ending unconditional releases during early October is Sherm Lollar, 39, nine-time All-Star and 3x Gold Glove Award-winning catcher, who is cut loose by the Chicago White Sox.
- October 6 – At Dodger Stadium in Game 4, Sandy Koufax again defeats the New York Yankees, 2–1, completing a shocking World Series sweep for the Los Angeles Dodgers. Whitey Ford gives up only two hits, both by Frank Howard, who belts a long home run in the fifth inning to start the Dodgers' scoring. The Yankees are swept in a World Series for the first time; they bat just .171 and score only four runs, second-lowest in World Series history. Curiously, the Dodgers will set the mark for fewest runs scored in a World Series only three years later, falling victim to a decisive sweep at the hands of the Baltimore Orioles.
- October 8 – The St. Louis Cardinals sign amateur free agent left-hander and future Hall-of-Famer Steve Carlton, 18, from Miami Dade College.
- October 10 – Reacting to the poor performances of its two 1962 expansion teams—especially the New York Mets, who have posted a ghastly 91–231 (.283) record and finished a combined 108½ games out of first place during their two-year lifespan so far—the National League holds a special, one-of-a-kind "assistance" draft to supplement their rosters. The eight pre-1962 NL franchises offer up a total of 32 players available to the Mets and Houston Colt .45s for $30,000 each, but only three are chosen in the draft, which is conducted by phone and lasts a mere five minutes:
  - The Mets select pitcher Jack Fisher, 24, from the San Francisco Giants and first base prospect Bill Haas, 20, from the Dodgers.
  - The Colt .45s—who have fared better than the Mets, with a two-year mark of 130–192 (.404)—select relief pitcher Claude Raymond, 26, from the Milwaukee Braves.
- October 12 – In what is the only Hispanic American major league All-Star Game, the National League team beats the American League 5–2 at the Polo Grounds. The game features such names as Felipe Alou, Luis Aparicio, Orlando Cepeda, Roberto Clemente, Julián Javier, Minnie Miñoso, Tony Oliva and Zoilo Versalles. Vic Power receives a pregame award as the number one Latin player. NL starter Juan Marichal strikes out six in four innings, though reliever Al McBean is the winning pitcher. Pinch hitter Manny Mota drives in two runs against loser Pedro Ramos. This was the last baseball game played at the Polo Grounds, as the New York Mets would move into the brand new Shea Stadium in 1964.
- October 14 – The Cleveland Indians release 300-game-winner and future Hall-of-Famer Early Wynn, 43, and name him their new pitching coach.
- October 29 – The New York Yankees release catcher and playing coach Yogi Berra, 38, so he can manage the 1964 Bombers. He succeeds Ralph Houk, who moves up to general manager, replacing the retiring Roy Hamey.
- October 30 – Capping a brilliant 1963 season and a sweep of major awards during the month of October, Sandy Koufax breezes to the National League's Most Valuable Player Award. Today, he captures 14 of a possible 20 first place votes and 237 points to best Dick Groat of the St. Louis Cardinals (four, 190). Six days earlier, he was unanimously voted winner of the Cy Young Award—then given to only one hurler across both major leagues; and 24 days ago, he was selected World Series MVP. Before winning two games in the World Series, and setting a new, single-game strikeout record in Game 1, Koufax led the NL (and all of MLB) in games won (25), strikeouts (306), earned run average (1.88) and shutouts (11).

=== November ===
- November 4 – The New York Mets trade pitcher Roger Craig to the St. Louis Cardinals for young pitcher Bill Wakefield and veteran outfielder George Altman. Craig, 33, went 15–46 (including an 18-game personal losing streak) for the expansion Mets but he will help the Cardinals win the 1964 World Series.
- November 7 – Catcher Elston Howard becomes the first Black player to win the American League Most Valuable Player Award. The 34-year-old, nine-year veteran of the New York Yankees this year is selected to the AL All-Star team for the seventh straight year and wins the first of his two Gold Glove Awards. In the MVP voting, Howard wins 15 of 20 first place votes and 248 points; Al Kaline (one first-place vote, 148) is runner-up.
- November 18 – The Detroit Tigers trade slugger Rocky Colavito, whose production dropped to 22 homers in 1963, pitcher Bob Anderson and $50,000 to the Kansas City Athletics for pitchers Dave Wickersham and Ed Rakow and second baseman Jerry Lumpe.
- November 19 – United States Marine Corps veteran and former New York Yankees outfielder Hank Bauer signs a one-year contract to manage the Baltimore Orioles. Bauer succeeds Billy Hitchcock, fired September 29, and is expected to bring greater discipline to the Orioles' culture. Bauer's term will last into July 1968, during which the Birds narrowly miss the 1964 pennant, but take home the 66-year-old franchise's first-ever World Series championship in 1966.
- November 26
  - Second baseman Pete Rose is a landslide winner of National League Rookie of the Year honors, taking 17 of 20 first place votes, with the others going to Ron Hunt (2) and Ray Culp (1). Rose becomes the second Cincinnati Reds player to win the award, joining Frank Robinson.
  - The Reds sell the contract of former starting third baseman Gene Freese to the Pittsburgh Pirates. A key member of Cincinnati's 1961 NL champions, Freese, 29, suffered a badly broken ankle in spring training the following season and was able to appear in only 84 total games during 1962 and 1963.
- November 27:
  - Chicago White Sox pitcher Gary Peters, who posted a 19–8 record with 189 strikeouts and a 2.33 ERA, edges teammate third baseman Pete Ward (.295 BA, 22 HR, 84 RBI) and Minnesota Twins outfielder Jimmie Hall (.260, 33, 80) for American League Rookie of the Year honors. Peters takes 10 of 20 first-place votes, Ward six and Hall four.
  - In an "all first basemen" transaction, the Kansas City Athletics acquire Jim Gentile and $25,000 from the Baltimore Orioles in exchange for Norm Siebern.

=== December ===
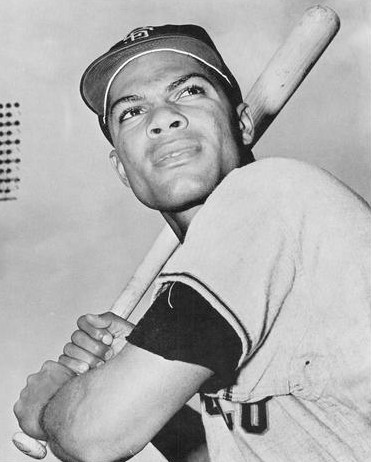
Felipe Alou in 1961

- December 2:
  - In today's Rule 5 draft, the Los Angeles Angels select second baseman Bobby Knoop, 25, from the Milwaukee Braves. Knoop will form a formidable double play combo with shortstop Jim Fregosi for the next five seasons, winning three Gold Glove Awards and making the 1966 AL All-Star squad.
  - In the first-year professional player draft then in force, 19 young players change organizations. They include future All-Star Reggie Smith (selected by the Boston Red Sox from the Minnesota Twins) and longtime major-leaguers Rudy May (selected by the Chicago White Sox from the Twins), Bobby Tolan (by the St. Louis Cardinals from the Pittsburgh Pirates) and Luke Walker (by the Pirates from the Red Sox). This short-lived draft will be phased out in 1965 when the MLB amateur draft is adopted.
  - The Angels trade outfielder Leon Wagner, a former All-Star, to the Cleveland Indians for pitcher Barry Latman and first baseman Joe Adcock (as a "player to be named later").
  - Bad news for knuckleball pitchers: the MLB Rules Committee bans oversized catcher's mitts, effective in 1965.
  - The Indianapolis and Little Rock franchises are transferred from the International League to the Pacific Coast League. With the movement, the IL is reduced to eight clubs while the PCL membership is raised to 12 clubs. The Class A Pioneer League steps down a classification to become a Rookie league with a "short season" schedule, and two new spring training complex-based circuits, the Sarasota Rookie League and Cocoa Rookie League, are planned to debut in Florida in 1964.
- December 3 – The San Francisco Giants and Milwaukee Braves announce a seven-player trade. The Giants send pitcher Billy Hoeft, catcher Ed Bailey, infielder Ernie Bowman ("PTBNL") and outfielder Felipe Alou to the Braves for pitchers Bob Hendley and Bob Shaw and catcher Del Crandall. Alou, Bailey, Crandall and Shaw are former or future All-Stars.
- December 4 – The Cleveland Indians reacquire Al Smith, a member of their 1954 AL champions, from the Baltimore Orioles for fellow outfielder Willie Kirkland and $25,000.
- December 5 – The Philadelphia Phillies obtain a top-of-the-rotation starting pitcher—and future Hall of Famer—by acquiring seven-time American League All-Star Jim Bunning from the Detroit Tigers. The Phils also receive veteran catcher Gus Triandos and send back outfielder Don Demeter and pitcher Jack Hamilton to Detroit.
- December 6 – The Los Angeles Dodgers sell the contract of 1963 World Series batting star Bill Skowron to the Washington Senators.
- December 10 – The Chicago White Sox bid goodbye to future Hall of Famer and former American League MVP Nellie Fox, almost 36, trading him to the Houston Colt .45s for pitcher Jim Golden, outfielder Danny Murphy and cash. Fox had played 14 full seasons in a White Sox uniform.
- December 13 – The World Series champion Los Angeles Dodgers obtain left-hander Jim Brewer and catcher Cuno Barragan from the Chicago Cubs for southpaw Dick Scott. Brewer, 26, will spend all or part of 12 seasons with the Dodgers, almost exclusively as a relief pitcher, and post a 61–51 (2.62) record, with 126 saves.
- December 14 – The Baltimore Orioles acquire lefty Harvey Haddix from the Pittsburgh Pirates for minor-league shortstop Richard Yencha and cash. Famous for throwing 12 perfect innings for the Pirates as a starter in May 1959, Haddix, now 38, has become a relief specialist and will join the Baltimore bullpen in 1964.
- December 21 – Sandy Koufax is named the Southern California Athlete of the Year by the Helms Athletic Foundation.
- December 27 – The Houston Colt .45s purchase the contract of hard-hitting outfielder/first baseman Walt Bond from the Cleveland Indians. Diagnosed with leukemia in 1962, the 26-year-old Bond is examined by Houston's team physician before the deal is made; his findings determine that the disease is in remission.

== Births ==
=== January ===
- January 2
  - David Cone
  - Edgar Martínez
- January 4
  - Daryl Boston
  - Trey Hillman
- January 5

John Davis

  - Jeff Fassero
- January 6
  - Norm Charlton
  - Bob Davidson
- January 7 – Craig Shipley
- January 8 – Shane Turner
- January 15 – William Brennan
- January 18 – Bill Sampen
- January 19 – Scott Little
- January 20 – Cecil Espy
- January 22
  - Javier Ortiz
  - Jeff Treadway
- January 23 – Marty Brown
- January 26
  - Kevin Blankenship
  - José Segura
- January 28 – Gary Mielke
- January 29 – Brian Meyer
- January 31
  - Dave Cochrane
  - Francisco Oliveras

=== February ===
- February 7 – Brian O'Nora
- February 10
  - Lenny Dykstra
  - Dane Johnson
- February 11 – Todd Benzinger
- February 14 – John Marzano
- February 15 – Barry Jones
- February 18
  - LaVel Freeman
  - Jeff McKnight
- February 20 – Phil Lombardi
- February 21 – Jim Olander
- February 22 – Don Wakamatsu
- February 23 – Bobby Bonilla
- February 24 – Matías Carrillo
- February 25
  - Larry Arndt
  - Joel McKeon
  - Paul O'Neill

=== March ===
- March 1
  - Tony Castillo
  - Rich Rodriguez
- March 7 – Keith Miller
- March 9 – Terry Mulholland
- March 10 – John Cangelosi
- March 13 – Mariano Duncan
- March 14 – Mike Rochford
- March 16 – Fieldin Culbreth
- March 19 – Chuck Jackson
- March 20
  - Rick Parker
  - Dana Williams
- March 21 – Shawon Dunston
- March 22 – Rich Monteleone
- March 26 – Luis Medina
- March 27
  - Mike Dalton
  - Drew Hall
- March 29 – Laz Díaz

=== April ===
- April 3 – Chris Bosio
- April 9
  - Mike Brumley
  - José Guzmán
- April 10
  - Mike Devereaux
  - Marvin Freeman
  - Jeff Gray
- April 13 – Mark Leiter
- April 18
  - Alex Madrid
  - Pete Stanicek
- April 21 – Ken Caminiti
- April 24 – Tony DeFrancesco
- April 26 – Lou Thornton

=== May ===
- May 3 – Joe Kmak
- May 5 – Kimiyasu Kudo
- May 14
  - Shawn Barton
  - Pat Borders
- May 17 – Tom Newell
- May 20 – David Wells
- May 21 – José Román
- May 27
  - Scott Jordan
  - Edwin Núñez

=== June ===
- June 2 – Bryan Harvey
- June 8 – Scott Ruskin
- June 12 – Keith Miller
- June 17
  - Tom Drees
  - Matt Kinzer
- June 18 – Russ McGinnis
- June 21 – Jeff Musselman
- June 25 – Mike Stanley
- June 27 – Nelson Simmons

=== July ===
- July 3 – Don August
- July 4 – José Oquendo
- July 6
  - Todd Burns
  - Lance Johnson
- July 7 – Paul Nauert
- July 9 – Mark Higgins
- July 14 – John Dopson
- July 17 – Bobby Thigpen
- July 18 – Mike Greenwell
- July 19
  - Mark Carreon
  - Vicente Palacios
- July 22
  - Gary Eave
  - Denny Gonzalez
- July 23 – Pat Pacillo
- July 29
  - Steve Frey
  - Tommy Gregg
- July 30 – Jeff Shaver
- July 31 – Scott Bankhead

=== August ===
- August 8
  - Brett Gideon
  - Ron Karkovice
- August 9 – Vance Lovelace
- August 10 – Jerald Clark
- August 11
  - Mike Huff
  - Van Snider
- August 12 – Kent Anderson
- August 13
  - Jeff Ballard
  - Dennis Powell
- August 14 – Mike Cook
- August 15 – Eric Fox
- August 17 – Jeff Fischer
- August 20
  - Brad Arnsberg
  - José Cecena
  - Kal Daniels
  - Israel Sánchez
- August 21 – Ken Jackson
- August 22 – Darrin Jackson
- August 29 – Jeff Richardson

=== September ===
- September 3
  - Ced Landrum
  - Eric Plunk
- September 5 – Jeff Brantley
- September 6 – John Pawlowski
- September 10
  - Randy Johnson
  - Terry Wells
- September 12
  - Keith Hughes
  - Mike Roesler
- September 13 – Rodney McCray
- September 21
  - Troy Afenir
  - Cecil Fielder
- September 22 – Jeff Peterek
- September 23 – Terry McGriff
- September 25 – Eric Hetzel
- September 26 – Calvin Jones
- September 28
  - Charlie Kerfeld
  - Hawa Koroma

=== October ===
- October 1 – Mark McGwire
- October 4 – Bruce Ruffin
- October 7 – Ty Van Burkleo
- October 9 – Félix Fermín
- October 13 – Bryan Hickerson
- October 17 – Ravelo Manzanillo
- October 18 – Jeff Wetherby
- October 20 – Luis Encarnación
- October 22 – Bill Fulton
- October 24 – Mark Grant
- October 27
  - Eric Bell
  - Bip Roberts
- October 31
  - Fred McGriff
  - Matt Nokes
  - Mike Smith

=== November ===
- November 2
  - Sam Horn
  - Pat Rice
- November 3 – Mike Christopher
- November 8 – Dwight Smith
- November 10 – Andrés Thomas
- November 11 – Rey Quiñones
- November 15 – Yasuaki Taiho
- November 18 – Dante Bichette
- November 23
  - Rich Sauveur
  - Dale Sveum
- November 25 – Marty Foster
- November 28 – Walt Weiss

=== December ===
- December 1 – Greg W. Harris
- December 3 – Damon Berryhill
- December 4 – Bernardo Brito
- December 5 – Sam Khalifa
- December 6 – Lance Blankenship
- December 7
  - Jim Austin
  - Billy Bates
  - Steve Howard
  - Shane Mack
- December 9 – Tom Magrann
- December 10
  - Doug Henry
  - Luis Polonia
  - Gil Reyes
  - Rick Wrona
- December 16 – Chris Jelic
- December 18 – Jim Czajkowski
- December 27 – Jim Leyritz
- December 28 – Mel Stottlemyre Jr.

== Deaths ==
=== January ===
- January 4 – Sam Covington, 68, first baseman who played in 40 games over three seasons for the 1913 St. Louis Browns and 1917–1918 Boston Braves.
- January 5 – Rogers Hornsby, 66, Hall-of-Fame second baseman (1915–1937), mainly for the St. Louis Cardinals; seven-time batting champion (including a .424 mark in 1924), twice MVP, and the first National League player to hit 300 home runs; batted .358 lifetime, won two NL Triple Crowns (1922, 1925) and, during the first six years of the 1920s, averaged .397 (including .424 in 1924), with 216 hits and 26 home runs, leading the NL in batting, on-base percentage and slugging percentage, as well as in batting, every year; as player–manager led 1926 Cardinals to their first World Series title, and also played for New York Giants, Boston Braves, Chicago Cubs and St. Louis Browns; also managed Braves, Cubs, Browns and Cincinnati Reds; equally known for his blunt, uncompromising and prickly personality.
- January 7 – Harl Maggert, 79, outfielder who appeared in 77 total games for the 1907 Pittsburgh Pirates and 1912 Philadelphia Athletics; his son played for the 1938 Brooklyn Dodgers.
- January 16 – Tommy Thompson, 73, pitcher in seven games for 1912 New York Highlanders.
- January 20 – Jimmy Wiggs, 86, pitcher who worked in 13 MLB games, two for the 1903 Cincinnati Reds and 11 for 1905–1906 Detroit Tigers; as of 2023, one of three big-league players born in Norway.
- January 29
  - Win Ballou, 65, pitcher in 99 games over four seasons between 1925 and 1929 for Washington Senators, St. Louis Browns and Brooklyn Robins.
  - Lee Meadows, 68, pitcher who won 188 games for the Cardinals, Phillies and Pirates, as well as the first modern major leaguer to wear glasses.
- January 31 – Ossie Vitt, 73, third baseman for the 1912–1918 Detroit Tigers and 1919–1921 Boston Red Sox; longtime minor-league manager known for piloting 1937 Newark Bears, one of the strongest clubs in history of minors; managed 1938–1940 Cleveland Indians to a 262–198–2 (.570) record, but his tenure was marred by a player revolt.

=== February ===
- February 2 – Emil Planeta, 54, pitcher who worked in two games for the New York Giants in September 1931.
- February 9 – Ray Starr, 56, All-Star pitcher who pitched for six teams—most prominently the 1941–1943 Cincinnati Reds—and won 37 career games.
- February 10 – Bunny Brief, 70, outfielder/first baseman who batted only .223 in 184 MLB games for the 1912–1913 St. Louis Browns, 1915 Chicago White Sox and 1917 Pittsburgh Pirates, but a feared minor-league slugger who led the American Association in homers five teams between 1920 and 1926 and amassed seasons of 191, 151, 164, and 175 runs batted in over the same span.
- February 15
  - Bump Hadley, 58, pitcher who worked in 528 games over 16 years (1926–1941) for six MLB teams (going 161–165, 4.24); ended Mickey Cochrane's career with a 1937 pitch that fractured his skull; later a broadcaster in Boston.
  - Harlin Pool, 54, outfielder who appeared in 127 games for the 1934–1935 Cincinnati Reds.
- February 17 – Lee Thompson, 64, left-hander who pitched in four games for the 1921 Chicago White Sox.
- February 20 – Bill Hinchman, 79, outfielder for the Cincinnati Reds (1905–1906), Cleveland Naps (1907–1909) and Pittsburgh Pirates (1915–1918, 1920) who twice (1915, 1916) batted over .300 and led National League in triples (16 in 1916); later, a scout.
- February 22 – Harry Schwarts, 44, American League umpire from September 8, 1960, until his death; worked in 338 AL games and the first of 1962's two All-Star games.
- February 25 – Bill Hughes, 66, pitcher who went 302–249 in 761 minor-league games over 20 consecutive seasons (1920–1939), but made only one MLB appearance — on September 15, 1921, as a member of the Pittsburgh Pirates.
- February 27 – Lefty Schegg, 73, pitcher who worked in two games for 1912 Washington Senators.
- February 28
  - Eppa Rixey, 71, pitcher elected to the Hall of Fame just one month earlier; winningest left-hander in NL history (until 1959) with 266 victories for Philadelphia Phillies (1912–1917 and 1919–1920) and Cincinnati Reds (1921–1933); won 20 games four times and lost 20 games twice.
  - Charlie Spearman, 71, catcher/first baseman for the 1923–1926 Brooklyn Royal Giants and 1928–1929 New York Lincoln Giants of the Eastern Colored League and American Negro League.

=== March ===
- March 1 – Irish Meusel, 69, left fielder for four MLB teams over 11 seasons between 1914 and 1927, principally the Philadelphia Phillies and New York Giants; member of 1921 and 1922 world champion Giants; batted .310 lifetime and led NL in RBI in 1923; older brother of Bob Meusel.
- March 4 – Jess Cortazzo, 58, diminutive shortstop — listed as 5 feet 3 inches (1.60 m), 142 pounds (64 kg) — who had only one at-bat for the 1923 Chicago White Sox, but fashioned a 15-year career in the minor leagues.
- March 5 – Lefty Lorenzen, 70, pitcher who threw two innings in his only appearance in the majors, on September 12, 1913, for the Detroit Tigers.
- March 11
  - Joe Judge, 68, first baseman who batted over .300 nine times for Washington Senators (1915–1932); went 10-for-26 (.385) with five bases on balls to help lead his team to 1924 World Series title; also played for Brooklyn Dodgers (1933) and Boston Red Sox (1933–1934); later, head baseball coach at Georgetown for 20 years.
  - Robert "Farmer" Ray, 76, pitcher who appeared in 21 games for 1910 St. Louis Browns.
- March 14 – Charlie Harris, 85, third baseman for the 1899 Baltimore Orioles of the National League.
- March 16 – Tom Walsh, 78, catcher with 1906 Chicago Cubs who appeared in two games.
- March 27 – Fritz Knothe, 59, third baseman and shortstop who played in 174 games for the Boston Braves and Philadelphia Phillies in 1932–1933.
- March 29 – Wilcy Moore, 65, New York Yankees' ace relief pitcher who in 1927 saved 13 games and won 19 (he made 12 starts among his 50 appearances), and AL earned run average title (2.28); in addition, he won clinching Game 4 of 1927 World Series and was a member of Yanks' 1928 and 1932 world champs; also pitched briefly for Boston Red Sox in his six-season (1927–1929 and 1931–1933) and 261-game career.

=== April ===
- April 1 – Ladd White, 45, pitcher for 1947 Memphis Red Sox and 1948 Indianapolis Clowns of the Negro American League.
- April 7 – Jim Ball, 79, catcher who appeared in 16 games for the 1907–1908 Boston Doves of the National League.
- April 11 – Jim Wright, 62, pitcher and U.K. native who appeared in four games for the 1927–1928 St. Louis Browns.
- April 14 – Earl Kunz, 64, pitcher who worked in 21 games for the 1923 Pittsburgh Pirates.
- April 19 – Pryor McBee, 61, southpaw who appeared in one game for the Chicago White Sox on May 22, 1926.
- April 23 – Harry Harper, 67, pitched from 1913 through 1923 for the Washington Senators, Boston Red Sox, New York Yankees and Brooklyn Robins.
- April 25 – Hal Elliott, 63, Philadelphia Phillies pitcher who worked in 120 games from 1929 to 1933; posted a dreadful 6.95 career ERA in 3221/3 innings pitched, playing his home games at the Phils' bandbox stadium, Baker Bowl.
- April 27
  - Johnny Hutchings, 47, pitcher for the Cincinnati Reds and Boston Braves who worked in 155 games over six seasons between 1940 and 1946.
  - Lou Manske, 78, left-hander who hurled in two games for the 1906 Pittsburgh Pirates.

=== May ===
- May 4
  - Dickie Kerr, 69, pitcher who as a 1919 rookie won two World Series games for the Chicago White Sox, as one of the players not involved in fixing the Series; later helped a struggling pitcher-turned-hitter, Stan Musial.
  - Pat McNulty, 64, outfielder who played in 308 games for the Cleveland Indians (1922, 1924–1927).
  - Ray Pierce, 65, left-handed pitcher who worked in 66 career games for the Chicago Cubs and Philadelphia Phillies from 1924 to 1926.
- May 6 – Larry Woodall, 68, backup catcher who played 548 games for 1920–1929 Detroit Tigers; later, a longtime employee of Boston Red Sox as coach (1942–1948), director of public relations, and scout—when he famously took a pass on signing a teenaged Willie Mays.
- May 8 – Ben Glaspy, 67, outfielder for the 1926 Dayton Marcos of the Negro National League.
- May 16 – Don Hankins, 61, pitcher who worked in 20 games, 19 in relief, for the 1927 Detroit Tigers.
- May 22 – Dave Shean, 79, second baseman and captain of the World Series champion 1918 Boston Red Sox.
- May 23 – Gavvy Cravath, 82, right fielder and "dead-ball era" slugger, who won six home runs titles with Phillies between 1913 and 1919; managed Phils from July 8, 1919, through 1920 season.
- May 24 – Hi West, 78, pitcher in 19 games over two stints (in 1905 and 1911) with Cleveland Naps.
- May 27 – Dave Jolly, 38, knuckleball relief pitcher for the Milwaukee Braves from 1953 to 1957.
- May 28 – Paddy Mayes, 78, outfielder/pinch hitter who went 0-for-5 with one base on balls in eight games for the 1911 Philadelphia Phillies.
- May 29 – Fred Herbert, 76, pitcher who posted a 1–1 (1.06 ERA) with one complete game in two appearances, both starts, for the New York Giants in September 1915.
- May 30 – Joe McDonald, 75, third baseman in ten games for the 1910 St. Louis Browns.
- May 31 – Ernie Sulik, 52, outfielder for the 1936 Philadelphia Phillies.
- May – Connie Rector, 70, Negro leagues pitcher between 1920 and 1944; went 18–1 for the New York Lincoln Giants in 1929.

=== June ===
- June 1 – Henry Gillespie, 66, Negro leagues pitcher between 1921 and 1932.
- June 6 – Charlie Mullen, 74, first baseman for the Chicago White Sox and New York Yankees in the 1910s.
- June 8 – Earl Smith, 66, good-hitting catcher who batted .303 over 860 career games for 1919–1923 New York Giants, 1923–1924 Boston Braves, 1924–1928 Pittsburgh Pirates and 1928–1930 St. Louis Cardinals; played for five National League champions (1921, 1922, 1925, 1927, 1928, 1930), and three World Series champs (1921, 1922, 1925); batted .350 for Pittsburgh in 1925 World Series.
- June 10 – Mike Simon, 80, catcher who appeared in 379 games from 1909 to 1915 for Pittsburgh of the National League, then St. Louis and Brooklyn of the "outlaw" Federal League; member of 1909 World Series champion Pirates.
- June 18 – Ben Geraghty, 50, infielder who played in 70 total games for the 1936 Brooklyn Dodgers and 1943–1944 Boston Braves; legendary minor league manager who played a key role in the early career of Henry Aaron; at his death, incumbent skipper of the Jacksonville Suns of the International League.
- June 24
  - George Trautman, 73, president of the minor leagues since 1947; previously president of the American Association (1933–1945) and general manager of Detroit Tigers (1946).
  - Jud Wilson, 69, Hall of Fame and All-Star third baseman of the Negro leagues who batted .352 lifetime in 900 games between 1923 and 1945, and three times (1927, 1929, 1941) eclipsed the .400 mark.
- June 28 – Frank "Home Run" Baker, 77, Hall of Fame third baseman, a lifetime .307 hitter and four-time home run champion, as well as the last surviving member of Philadelphia Athletics' "$100,000 infield".

=== July ===
- July 1 – Earl Moseley, 75, pitcher who starred in the Federal League, winning 19 games for Indianapolis in 1914 and ERA championship (1.91) for Newark in 1915; also pitched for 1913 Boston Red Sox and 1916 Cincinnati Reds.
- July 2 – Pat Flanagan, 70, radio voice of the Chicago Cubs from 1929 to 1943 on WBBM, calling games for three National League champions and handling play-by-play for the first MLB All-Star Game in 1933; also described White Sox games.
- July 5 – Ben Demott, 74, pitcher for the Cleveland Naps from 1910 to 1911.
- July 8 – Roy Sanders, 69, pitcher who worked in 14 career contests for the 1918 New York Yankees and 1920 St. Louis Browns.
- July 12 – "Happy Jack" Cameron, 78, Canadian outfielder/pitcher who appeared in 18 games for Boston of the National League in 1906.
- July 14 – Bill Lindsay, 82, third baseman in 19 games for the 1911 Cleveland Naps.
- July 19 – Charlie Hanford, 81, native of the United Kingdom who appeared in 232 games as an outfielder for Buffalo and Chicago of the Federal League in 1914 and 1915,
- July 24 – Luther Roy, 60, pitcher who appeared in 56 career contests for the Cleveland Indians (1924–1925), Chicago Cubs (1927), Philadelphia Phillies (1929) and Brooklyn Robins (1929).
- July 25 – Rags Roberts, 67, outfielder/catcher for 1923 Baltimore Black Sox of the Eastern Colored League.
- July 27 – Hooks Dauss, 73, pitcher won 222 games, all for Detroit, for whom he played from 1912 through 1926.

=== August ===
- August 2 – Pete Standridge, 71, pitcher who appeared in 31 total games for 1911 St. Louis Cardinals and 1915 Chicago Cubs.
- August 4 – Bob Fisher, 76, shortstop and second baseman who played 503 games in the National League for Brooklyn, Chicago, Cincinnati and St. Louis over seven seasons spanning 1912 to 1919.
- August 5 – Herb Crompton, 51, catcher who played 38 career games in the majors as a member of the 1937 Washington Senators and 1945 New York Yankees.
- August 6 – Frank Ray, 54, outfielder in 26 games for the 1932 Montgomery Grey Sox of the Negro Southern League.
- August 10 – William Kinsler, 95, outfielder who appeared in one game for the New York Giants on June 8, 1893.
- August 12 – Dick Braggins, 85, pitcher during the American League's inaugural season, appearing in four games for Cleveland between May 16 and June 26, 1901.
- August 15 – Karl Drews, 43, pitcher who worked in 418 games for four MLB teams between 1946 and 1954, including 1947 champion New York Yankees.
- August 17 – Coco Ferrer, 48, Puerto Rican infielder for the 1946–1948 Indianapolis Clowns of the Negro American League.
- August 19 – Carl Zamloch, 73, pitcher who went 1–6 (2.45 ERA) in 17 games for the 1913 Detroit Tigers.
- August 21 – Tom Asmussen, 84, catcher who appeared in two games for the 1907 Boston Doves of the National League.
- August 24
  - Ren Kelly, 63, who pitched one game for the Philadelphia Athletics in 1923.
  - Arnold Waites, 48, pitcher/outfielder who played for the Homestead Grays (1936–1937) and Washington Elite Giants (1937) of the Negro National League.

=== September ===
- September 3 – Tony DeFate, 68, infielder/pinch hitter who got into 17 total games with the St. Louis Browns and Detroit Tigers in 1917.
- September 4 – Grant "Home Run" Johnson, 90, shortstop and slugger who played in Black baseball from 1893 to 1923, before organization of the Negro leagues; fell short of entry into National Baseball Hall of Fame in 2022.
- September 8
  - Bill Knickerbocker, 51, infielder for five different teams from 1933 to 1942, and a member of 1938 and 1939 Yankees champion teams as a backup infielder.
  - "Honolulu Johnnie" Williams, 74, Hawaii native who pitched in four games for the 1914 Detroit Tigers.
- September 11 – Ham Hyatt, 78, reserve outfielder/first baseman who appeared in 465 career games for the Pittsburgh Pirates (1909–1910, 1912–1914), St. Louis Cardinals (1915) and New York Yankees (1922).
- September 15
  - Ray Miner, 66, southpaw who hurled in one MLB game for the Philadelphia Athletics on September 15, 1921.
  - Isadore Muchnick, 55, Boston city councilor who in 1945 pressured his city's Braves and Red Sox to break the baseball color line by offering tryouts to black players Jackie Robinson, Sam Jethroe and Marvin Williams. The Braves ignore Muchnick and the Red Sox hold a pro forma tryout. Later in 1945, Robinson will sign with the Brooklyn Dodgers' organization and become the pioneer in "Baseball's Great Experiment."
- September 16
  - Johnny Niggeling, 60, one of four knuckleballers in starting rotation of 1945 Washington Senators; also pitched for Boston Bees/Braves, Cincinnati Reds and St. Louis Browns between 1938 and 1946.
  - Ollie Waldon, 52, outfielder/third baseman for the 1944 Chicago American Giants of the Negro American League.
- September 19 – Slim Harriss, 66, pitcher who went 95–135 (4.25) for mostly struggling Philadelphia Athletics and Boston Red Sox teams from 1920 to 1928.
- September 24 – Daff Gammons, 87, who appeared in 28 games—primarily as an outfielder—in 1901 for Boston of the National League.
- September 27 – Andy Coakley, 80, pitcher who won 18 games for 1905 Athletics, later coach at Columbia for 37 years.
- September 30 – Jack White, 85, outfielder who played almost two decades (1895–1913) in minors but appeared in only one big-league game, with Boston of the National League on June 26, 1904.

=== October ===
- October 2
  - Eddie Bacon, 68, pitcher/pinch hitter who appeared in three games for the 1917 Philadelphia Athletics.
  - Cy Perkins, 67, catcher for 17 seasons in the American League, mostly with the Athletics (1917–1930); also a coach for New York Yankees, Detroit Tigers and Philadelphia Phillies for 15 seasons between 1932 and 1954; member of four World Series champions (1929, 1930, 1932, 1935).
- October 5 – George Curry, 74, pitcher who went 0–3 (7.47 ERA) in three games and three starts for the 1911 St. Louis Browns.
- October 9 – Maywood Brown, 67, pitcher for the 1921 and 1925 Indianapolis ABCs of the Negro National League.
- October 18
  - Frank Emmer, 67, Cincinnati Reds shortstop who played in 122 career games over two seasons spaced over a decade (1916, 1926).
  - Stu Flythe, 51, Philadelphia Athletics pitcher who worked in 17 games during 1936 and led American League with 16 wild pitches.
- October 25 – Jim Lindsey, 64, pitcher who hurled 177 career games, mostly in relief, for the Cleveland Indians (1922 and 1924), St. Louis Cardinals (1929–1934), Cincinnati Reds (1934) and Brooklyn Dodgers (1937); member of 1931 world champion Redbirds.
- October 26 – Newt Hunter, 83, first baseman in 65 games for 1911 Pittsburgh Pirates; coach for 1920 Cardinals and 1928–1930 and 1933 Phillies.

=== November ===
- November 2 – Luis Pillot, 46, native of Puerto Rico who appeared as a pitcher/outfielder for the New York Black Yankees (1941, 1946) and Cincinnati Clowns (1943) of the Negro leagues.
- November 6 – Clarence Mitchell, 72, spitball pitcher who won 125 games over 18 seasons between 1911 and 1932 — most notably for the Philadelphia Phillies and Brooklyn Robins — for six MLB clubs; hit into unassisted triple play in 1920 World Series.
- November 12 – Ed Connolly, 54, catcher for the Boston Red Sox between 1929 and 1932; his son pitched for 1964 Red Sox.
- November 13 – Muddy Ruel, 67, catcher for 19 seasons for six American League teams, including 1924 World Series champion Washington Senators (when he scored the Series-deciding run); held law degree from Washington University in St. Louis; later a coach with the Chicago White Sox (1935–1945) and Cleveland Indians (1948–1950), assistant to Commissioner of Baseball Happy Chandler (1945–1946), manager of St. Louis Browns (1947), and general manager of Detroit Tigers (1954–1956).
- November 14 – Oscar "Ski" Melillo, 64, second baseman in 1,377 games for St. Louis Browns (1926–1935) and Boston Red Sox (1935–1937); interim manager of 1938 Browns; later a longtime coach associated with manager Lou Boudreau.
- November 17
  - Merito Acosta, 67, Cuban outfielder for the Washington Senators (1913–1916, 1918) and Philadelphia Athletics (1918); broke into majors at 17 as one of first Cuban ballplayers in American League; his brother was an MLB pitcher.
  - Lewis Means, 64, catcher who played for the Birmingham Black Barons and the Atlantic City Bacharach Giants of the Negro leagues between 1920 and 1928.
- November 20 – Marty Hopkins, 56, second-string third baseman who played in 136 career games for 1934 Philadelphia Phillies and 1934–1935 Chicago White Sox.
- November 21
  - Ed Hock, 64, outfielder/pinch runner for 1920 St. Louis Cardinals and 1923–1924 Cincinnati Reds, getting into 19 MLB games.
  - Jimmy Shields, 58, pitcher/second baseman for Atlantic City who led the Eastern Colored League in earned run average (1.51) in 1928.
- November 22 – John F. Kennedy, 46, President of the United States who threw out the ceremonial first pitch of the 1961 MLB season and became only the 2nd president to attend an All-Star Game in 1962.
- November 25 – Rube Parnham, 69, pitcher for 1916–1917 Philadelphia Athletics who worked in six career games; compiled a 2–1 won–lost mark in four contests for the abysmal 1916 Athletics to become the sole pitcher with a winning record for a team that lost 117 of 153 games.
- November 29 – Arch Reilly, 72, third baseman who played three innings of one MLB game for the Pittsburgh Pirates on June 1, 1917.

=== December ===
- December 3 – Nellie Pott, 64, southpaw who pitched in two games for the 1922 Cleveland Indians.
- December 8 – Red Worthington, 57, left fielder for Boston Braves from 1931 to 1934.
- December 10 – Carl Fischer, 55, left-handed hurler who appeared in 191 games for five American League teams (principally the Washington Senators and Detroit Tigers) between 1930 and 1937.
- December 12 – Myles Thomas, 66, pitcher for 1926–1929 New York Yankees and 1930 Senators who worked in 105 MLB games; member of World Series champions in 1927 and 1928 but did not appear in either Fall Classic.
- December 13 – Joe Jaeger, 68, pitcher who played in two games for the 1920 Chicago Cubs.
- December 14 – Gacho Torres, 67, outfielder/first baseman and Puerto Rico native who appeared for the 1926 Newark Stars of the Eastern Colored League.
- December 16 – Jimmy Cockerham, 53, catcher/first baseman for the 1937 Indianapolis Athletics and 1943 Cleveland Buckeyes of the Negro American League.
- December 20 – Dinny McNamara, 58, outfielder/pinch runner who played in 20 games for the 1927–1928 Boston Braves.
- December 21
  - Lefty Ross, 60, who pitched for five Negro National League teams in four seasons (1924 to 1927).
  - Happy Townsend, 84, pitcher who went 34–82 (with a 3.59 ERA) in 153 games for three clubs between 1901 and 1906, notably posting a 22–69 mark for execrable Washington Senators teams from 1902 to 1905.
  - Harry Williams, 73, first baseman who played 86 total games for 1913–1914 New York Yankees.
- December 24 – Skipper Roberts, 75, lefty-swinging catcher and pinch hitter who appeared in 82 games for the 1913 St. Louis Cardinals and the 1914 Pittsburgh Rebels and Chicago Chi-Feds of the Federal League.
- December 28 – Ray Keating, 70, pitcher who appeared in 130 career games for the New York Highlanders/Yankees (1912–1916, 1918) and Boston Braves (1919).
- December 30 – Wilbur Good, 78, outfielder who played in 749 games for six teams, primarily the Chicago Cubs, over 11 seasons between 1905 and 1918.
- December 31
  - Junie Barnes, 52, left-hander who pitched to only two batters in his two MLB games, on September 12 and 21, 1934, as a member of the Cincinnati Reds.
  - Bill Batsch, 71, who appeared in one game in professional baseball as a pinch hitter (and drew a base on balls) for the Pittsburgh Pirates on September 9, 1916.
