= 1963 Kansas City Athletics season =

1963 Kansas City Athletics
- League: American League
- Ballpark: Municipal Stadium
- City: Kansas City, Missouri
- Record: 73–89 (.451)
- League place: 8th
- Owners: Charles O. Finley
- General managers: Pat Friday
- Managers: Ed Lopat
- Television: KCMO
- Radio: KCMO (AM) (Monte Moore, George Bryson)

The 1963 Kansas City Athletics season was the ninth for the franchise in Kansas City and the 63rd overall. It involved the A's finishing eighth in the American League with a record of 73 wins and 89 losses, 31 1/2 games behind the AL Champion New York Yankees. The 1963 season was also the first season in which the Athletics debuted their current color scheme of green and gold and the first to feature names on the back of the jerseys.

== Regular season ==
- Owner Charlie Finley changed the team's colors to Kelly green, Fort Knox Gold and Wedding Gown White, and replaced Connie Mack's elephant mascot with a Missouri mule — not just a cartoon logo, but a real mule, which he named after himself: "Charlie O, the Mule." In reading the Chicago Tribune, Charlie Finley read about the Missouri Mule, a mule which helped troops in World War I carry ammunition. Finley decided that a mule would become the club's new mascot.
- He also began phasing out the team name "Athletics" in favor of simply, "A's." In June 1963, Bill Bryson wrote of the uniforms,

Kelly green is the Athletics' accent color. It was more a nauseous green the players wore on their wholesome, clean-cut faces the first few times they had to appear in public looking like refugees from a softball league.

- Owner Charlie Finley was upset about his stadium deal with Kansas City. He had visited Dallas, Texas and Oakland, California as prospective places for relocation. Finley also talked to Atlanta Journal sportswriter Furman Bisher about relocating the A's to Atlanta. Later in the season, Finley made threats of moving the club to Louisville, Kentucky and renaming the franchise the Kentucky Colonels. As a sign of protest, Finley relocated the A's offices from the stadium to the garage of team scout J Bowman.

=== Season standings ===
American League
Team	W	L	Pct.	GB	Home	Road
New York Yankees	104	57	.646	—	58‍–‍22	46‍–‍35
Chicago White Sox	94	68	.580	10½	49‍–‍33	45‍–‍35
Minnesota Twins	91	70	.565	13	48‍–‍33	43‍–‍37
Baltimore Orioles	86	76	.531	18½	48‍–‍33	38‍–‍43
Cleveland Indians	79	83	.488	25½	41‍–‍40	38‍–‍43
Detroit Tigers	79	83	.488	25½	47‍–‍34	32‍–‍49
Boston Red Sox	76	85	.472	28	44‍–‍36	32‍–‍49
Kansas City Athletics	73	89	.451	31½	36‍–‍45	37‍–‍44
Los Angeles Angels	70	91	.435	34	39‍–‍42	31‍–‍49
Washington Senators	56	106	.346	48½	31‍–‍49	25‍–‍57

=== Record vs. opponents ===
1963 American League record Sources:
Team	BAL	BOS	CWS	CLE	DET	KCA	LAA	MIN	NYY	WAS
Baltimore	—	7–11	7–11	10–8	13–5	9–9	9–9	9–9	7–11	15–3
Boston	11–7	—	8–10	10–8	9–9	7–11	9–8	7–11	6–12	9–9
Chicago	11–7	10–8	—	11–7	11–7	12–6	10–8	8–10	8–10	13–5
Cleveland	8–10	8–10	7–11	—	10–8	11–7	10–8	5–13	7–11	13–5
Detroit	5–13	9–9	7–11	8–10	—	13–5	12–6	8–10	8–10	9–9
Kansas City	9–9	11–7	6–12	7–11	5–13	—	10–8	9–9	6–12	10–8
Los Angeles	9–9	8–9	8–10	8–10	6–12	8–10	—	9–9	5–13	9–9
Minnesota	9–9	11–7	10–8	13–5	10–8	9–9	9–9	—	6–11	14–4
New York	11–7	12–6	10–8	11–7	10–8	12–6	13–5	11–6	—	14–4
Washington	3–15	9–9	5–13	5–13	9–9	8–10	9–9	4–14	4–14	—

=== Notable transactions ===
- May 25, 1963: Joe Azcue and Dick Howser were traded by the Athletics to the Cleveland Indians for Doc Edwards and $100,000.
- May 26, 1963: Sammy Esposito was signed as a free agent by the Athletics.

=== Roster ===
1963 Kansas City Athletics
Roster
Pitchers: 22 Norm Bass; 43 Ted Bowsfield; 25 Moe Drabowsky; 28 Bill Fischer; 35 Bill Landis; 32 Pete Lovrich; 31 Aurelio Monteagudo; 27,36 Fred Norman; 35 John O'Donoghue; 19 Orlando Peña; 27 Dan Pfister; 21 Ed Rakow; 22 José Santiago; 24 Diego Seguí; 18 Tom Sturdivant; 25 Dave Thies; 26 Dave Wickersham; 20 Dale Willis; 33 John Wyatt	Catchers: 10 Joe Azcue; 18 Billy Bryan; 10 Doc Edwards; 14 Charley Lau; 8 Haywood Sullivan; Infielders: 2 Wayne Causey; 16 Ed Charles; 1 Sammy Esposito; 1 Dick Green; 12 Ken Harrelson; 1 Dick Howser; 29 Tony La Russa; 11 Jerry Lumpe; 7 Norm Siebern	Outfielders: 3 George Alusik; 4 Gino Cimoli; 5 Bobby Del Greco; 6 Chuck Essegian; 9 Jay Hankins; 12,20 Manny Jiménez; 9 Héctor Martínez; 9 Tommie Reynolds; 15 José Tartabull; 17 John Wojcik	Manager: 30 Ed Lopat; Coaches: 40 Jimmy Dykes; 41 Mel McGaha; 42 Gus Niarhos

== Player stats ==
= Indicates team leader

=== Batting ===
==== Starters by position ====
Note: Pos = Position; G = Games played; AB = At bats; H = Hits; Avg. = Batting average; HR = Home runs; RBI = Runs batted in

Pos.	Player	G	AB	H	Avg.	HR	RBI
C	Doc Edwards	71	240	60	.250	6	35
1B	Norm Siebern	152	556	151	.272	16	83
2B	Jerry Lumpe	157	595	161	.271	5	59
SS	Wayne Causey	139	554	155	.280	8	44
3B	Ed Charles	158	603	161	.267	15	79
LF	Chuck Essegian	101	231	52	.225	5	27
CF	Bobby Del Greco	121	306	65	.212	8	29
RF	Gino Cimoli	145	529	139	.263	4	48

==== Other batters ====
Note: G = Games played; AB = At bats; H = Hits; Avg. = Batting average; HR = Home runs; RBI = Runs batted in

Player	G	AB	H	Avg.	HR	RBI
José Tartabull	79	242	58	.240	1	19
Ken Harrelson	79	226	52	.230	6	23
George Alusik	87	221	59	.267	9	37
Charley Lau	62	187	55	.294	3	26
Manny Jiménez	60	157	44	.280	0	15
Haywood Sullivan	40	113	24	.212	0	8
Billy Bryan	24	65	11	.169	3	7
John Wojcik	19	59	11	.186	0	2
Tony La Russa	34	44	11	.250	0	1
Dick Howser	15	41	8	.195	0	1
Dick Green	13	37	10	.270	1	4
Jay Hankins	10	34	6	.176	1	4
Sammy Esposito	18	25	5	.200	0	2
Tommie Reynolds	8	19	1	.053	0	0
Héctor Martínez	6	14	4	.286	1	3
Joe Azcue	2	4	0	.000	0	0

=== Pitching ===
= Indicates league leader

==== Starting pitchers ====
Note: G = Games pitched; IP = Innings pitched; W = Wins; L = Losses; ERA = Earned run average; SO = Strikeouts

Player	G	IP	W	L	ERA	SO
Dave Wickersham	38	237.2	12	15	4.09	118
Orlando Peña	35	217.0	12	20	3.69	128
Moe Drabowsky	26	174.1	7	13	3.05	109
Ed Rakow	34	174.1	9	10	3.92	104
Fred Norman	2	6.1	0	1	11.37	6
John O'Donoghue	1	6.0	0	1	1.50	1

==== Other pitchers ====
Note: G = Games pitched; IP = Innings pitched; W = Wins; L = Losses; ERA = Earned run average; SO = Strikeouts

Player	G	IP	W	L	ERA	SO
Diego Seguí	38	167.0	9	6	3.77	116
Ted Bowsfield	41	111.1	5	7	4.45	67
Tom Sturdivant	17	53.0	1	2	3.74	26
Dave Thies	9	25.1	0	1	4.62	9
Dan Pfister	3	9.1	1	0	1.93	9
Norm Bass	3	7.2	0	0	11.74	4

==== Relief pitchers ====
Note: G = Games pitched; W = Wins; L = Losses; SV = Saves; ERA = Earned run average; SO = Strikeouts

Player	G	W	L	SV	ERA	SO
John Wyatt	63	6	4	21	3.13	81
Bill Fischer	45	9	6	3	3.57	34
Dale Willis	25	0	2	1	5.04	47
Pete Lovrich	20	1	1	0	7.84	16
José Santiago	4	1	0	0	9.00	6
Aurelio Monteagudo	4	0	0	0	2.57	3
Bill Landis	1	0	0	0	0.00	3

== Awards and honors ==
All-Star Game

- Norm Siebern, reserve

== Farm system ==
Level	Team	League	Manager
AAA	Portland Beavers	Pacific Coast League	Les Peden and Dan Carnevale
AA	Binghamton Triplets	Eastern League	John McNamara
A	Daytona Beach Islanders	Florida State League	Bobby Hofman
A	Burlington Bees	Midwest League	Grady Wilson
A	Lewiston Broncos	Northwest League	Bill Robertson
