= 1963 Detroit Tigers season =

Major League Baseball season

1963 Detroit Tigers
- League: American League
- Ballpark: Tiger Stadium
- City: Detroit, Michigan
- Record: 79–83 (.488)
- League place: T–5th
- Owners: John Fetzer
- General managers: Jim Campbell
- Managers: Bob Scheffing, Chuck Dressen
- Television: WJBK
- Radio: WKMH; WWJ; WJR (George Kell, Ernie Harwell)

The 1963 Detroit Tigers season was the team's 63rd season and the 52nd season at Tiger Stadium. The team finished tied for fifth place in the American League with a record of 79–83, 25 1/2 games behind the New York Yankees.

A sluggish start, then a seven-game, mid-June losing streak, cost third-year manager Bob Scheffing his job on June 17. He was replaced by 68-year-old veteran former MLB manager Chuck Dressen. When the change was made, the Tigers were in ninth place at 24–36 (.400), 11 1/2 games behind the Yankees. Scheffing's three-man coaching staff was released along with him. Under Dressen, Detroit would recover to win 55 of 102 games and move up to its fifth-place finish.

== Offseason ==
- November 26, 1962: 1962 first-year draft
  - Tom Matchick was drafted by the Tigers from the St. Louis Cardinals.
  - Rich Reese was drafted from the Tigers by the Minnesota Twins.
  - Conrad Cardinal was drafted from the Tigers by the Houston Colt .45s.
- November 26, 1962: Dick Brown was traded by the Tigers to the Baltimore Orioles for Whitey Herzog and Gus Triandos.

== Regular season ==
=== Season standings ===
American League
Team	W	L	Pct.	GB	Home	Road
New York Yankees	104	57	.646	—	58‍–‍22	46‍–‍35
Chicago White Sox	94	68	.580	10½	49‍–‍33	45‍–‍35
Minnesota Twins	91	70	.565	13	48‍–‍33	43‍–‍37
Baltimore Orioles	86	76	.531	18½	48‍–‍33	38‍–‍43
Cleveland Indians	79	83	.488	25½	41‍–‍40	38‍–‍43
Detroit Tigers	79	83	.488	25½	47‍–‍34	32‍–‍49
Boston Red Sox	76	85	.472	28	44‍–‍36	32‍–‍49
Kansas City Athletics	73	89	.451	31½	36‍–‍45	37‍–‍44
Los Angeles Angels	70	91	.435	34	39‍–‍42	31‍–‍49
Washington Senators	56	106	.346	48½	31‍–‍49	25‍–‍57

=== Record vs. opponents ===
1963 American League record Sources:
Team	BAL	BOS	CWS	CLE	DET	KCA	LAA	MIN	NYY	WAS
Baltimore	—	7–11	7–11	10–8	13–5	9–9	9–9	9–9	7–11	15–3
Boston	11–7	—	8–10	10–8	9–9	7–11	9–8	7–11	6–12	9–9
Chicago	11–7	10–8	—	11–7	11–7	12–6	10–8	8–10	8–10	13–5
Cleveland	8–10	8–10	7–11	—	10–8	11–7	10–8	5–13	7–11	13–5
Detroit	5–13	9–9	7–11	8–10	—	13–5	12–6	8–10	8–10	9–9
Kansas City	9–9	11–7	6–12	7–11	5–13	—	10–8	9–9	6–12	10–8
Los Angeles	9–9	8–9	8–10	8–10	6–12	8–10	—	9–9	5–13	9–9
Minnesota	9–9	11–7	10–8	13–5	10–8	9–9	9–9	—	6–11	14–4
New York	11–7	12–6	10–8	11–7	10–8	12–6	13–5	11–6	—	14–4
Washington	3–15	9–9	5–13	5–13	9–9	8–10	9–9	4–14	4–14	—

=== Notable transactions ===
- April 8, 1963: Denny McLain was selected off waivers by the Tigers from the Chicago White Sox as first-year waiver pick.
- May 8, 1963: Chico Fernández was traded by the Tigers to the Milwaukee Braves for Lou Johnson and cash.

=== Roster ===
1963 Detroit Tigers
Roster
Pitchers: 37 Hank Aguirre; 23 Bob Anderson; 14 Jim Bunning; 35 Bob Dustal; 41 Dick Egan; 13 Bill Faul; 46 Larry Foster; 18 Terry Fox; 21 Paul Foytack; 20 Fred Gladding; 42 Alan Koch; 17 Frank Lary; 29 Mickey Lolich; 34 Denny McLain; 15 Don Mossi; 16 Phil Regan; 33 Willie Smith; 22 Tom Sturdivant	Catchers: 11 Bill Freehan; 12 Mike Roarke; 36 John Sullivan; 10 Gus Triandos; Infielders: 25 Norm Cash; 9 Chico Fernández; 4 Whitey Herzog; 24 Frank Kostro; 3 Dick McAuliffe; 1 Bubba Phillips; 40 George Smith; 28 Coot Veal; 8 Don Wert; 2 Jake Wood	Outfielders: 26 Gates Brown; 38 Bill Bruton; 7 Rocky Colavito; 48 Willie Horton; 6 Al Kaline; 40 Bubba Morton; 24 George Thomas; Other batters: 5 Purnal Goldy; 20 Vic Wertz	Manager: 9 Chuck Dressen; 27 Bob Scheffing; Coaches: 31,54 Wayne Blackburn; 44 Phil Cavarretta; 33 Tom Ferrick; 34,52 Pat Mullin; 34 George Myatt; 41,53 Stubby Overmire; 35,51 Bob Swift

== Player stats ==
=== Batting ===
==== Starters by position ====
Note: Pos = Position; G = Games played; AB = At bats; H = Hits; Avg. = Batting average; HR = Home runs; RBI = Runs batted in

Pos	Player	G	AB	H	Avg.	HR	RBI
C	Gus Triandos	106	327	78	.239	14	41
1B	Norm Cash	147	493	133	.270	26	79
2B	Jake Wood	85	351	95	.271	11	27
SS	Dick McAuliffe	150	568	149	.262	13	61
3B	Bubba Phillips	128	464	114	.246	5	45
LF	Rocky Colavito	160	597	162	.271	22	91
CF	Bill Bruton	145	524	134	.256	8	48
RF	Al Kaline	145	551	172	.312	27	101

==== Other batters ====
Note: G = Games played; AB = At bats; H = Hits; Avg. = Batting average; HR = Home runs; RBI = Runs batted in

Player	G	AB	H	Avg.	HR	RBI
Bill Freehan	100	300	73	.243	9	36
Don Wert	78	251	65	.259	7	25
George Smith	52	171	37	.216	0	17
George Thomas	49	109	26	.239	1	11
Gates Brown	55	82	22	.268	2	14
Whitey Herzog	52	53	8	.151	0	7
Frank Kostro	31	52	12	.231	0	0
Chico Fernández	15	49	7	.143	0	1
Mike Roarke	23	44	14	.318	0	1
Willie Horton	15	43	14	.326	1	4
Coot Veal	15	32	7	.219	0	4
Bubba Morton	6	11	1	.091	0	2
Purnal Goldy	9	8	2	.250	0	0
John Sullivan	3	5	0	.000	0	0
Vic Wertz	6	5	0	.000	0	0

=== Pitching ===
==== Starting pitchers ====
Note: G = Games pitched; IP = Innings pitched; W = Wins; L = Losses; ERA = Earned run average; SO = Strikeouts

Player	G	IP	W	L	ERA	SO
Jim Bunning	39	248.1	12	13	3.88	196
Hank Aguirre	38	225.2	14	15	3.67	134
Phil Regan	38	189.0	15	9	3.86	115
Don Mossi	24	122.2	7	7	3.74	68
Frank Lary	16	107.1	4	9	3.27	46
Denny McLain	3	21.0	2	1	4.29	22

==== Other pitchers ====
Note: G = Games pitched; IP = Innings pitched; W = Wins; L = Losses; ERA = Earned run average; SO = Strikeouts

Player	G	IP	W	L	ERA	SO
Mickey Lolich	33	144.1	5	9	3.55	103
Bill Faul	28	97.0	5	6	4.64	64
Willie Smith	11	21.2	1	0	4.57	16
Alan Koch	7	10.0	1	1	10.80	5

==== Relief pitchers ====
Note: G = Games pitched; W = Wins; L = Losses; SV = Saves; ERA = Earned run average; SO = Strikeouts

Player	G	W	L	SV	ERA	SO
Terry Fox	46	8	6	11	3.59	35
Bob Anderson	32	3	1	0	3.30	38
Tom Sturdivant	28	1	2	2	3.76	36
Fred Gladding	22	1	1	7	1.98	24
Dick Egan	20	0	1	0	5.14	16
Paul Foytack	9	0	1	0	8.66	7
Bob Dustal	7	0	1	0	9.00	4
Larry Foster	1	0	0	0	13.50	1

== Farm system ==
Level	Team	League	Manager
AAA	Syracuse Chiefs	International League	Bob Swift and Frank Carswell
AA	Knoxville Smokies	Sally League	Frank Carswell, Frank Lary and Frank Skaff
A	Lakeland Tigers	Florida State League	Gail Henley
A	Thomasville Tigers	Georgia–Florida League	Al Federoff
A	Jamestown Tigers	New York–Penn League	Stubby Overmire, John O'Neil, Max Macon and Fred Hatfield
A	Duluth–Superior Dukes	Northern League	Bob Mavis

LEAGUE CHAMPIONS: Thomasville
