= Larry Foster =

Larry Foster may refer to:

- Larry Foster (American football)
- Larry Foster (baseball)
