= Dale Willis =

American baseball player (born 1938)

- Pitcher
- Born: May 29, 1936; Calhoun, Georgia
- Died: August 26, 2021 (aged 83)
- Batted: Right Threw: Right

MLB debut
- April 14, 1963, for the Kansas City Athletics

Last MLB appearance
- September 13, 1963, for the Kansas City Athletics

MLB statistics
- Win–loss record: 0–2
- Earned run average: 5.04
- Strikeouts: 47
- Stats at Baseball Reference

Teams
- Kansas City Athletics (1963)

Dale Jerome Willis (May 29, 1936 – August 26, 2021) was an American college and professional baseball player who was a pitcher in Major League Baseball (MLB) for a single season in 1963. He threw and batted right-handed and was listed as 5 feet 11 inches (1.80 m) tall and 165 pounds (75 kg).

Willis was born in Calhoun, Georgia. He attended the University of Florida in Gainesville, Florida, where he played for coach Dave Fuller's Florida Gators baseball team in 1955 and 1956. As a senior in 1956, he posted three consecutive games with ten or more strikeouts, averaged 11.9 strikeouts per game, and earned an All-SEC selection. He was later inducted into the University of Florida Athletic Hall of Fame as a "Gator Great" in 1976.

Willis was signed by the Kansas City Athletics in 1960, and spent six years playing for their minor league affiliates. For the 1963 Athletics, he appeared in 25 games pitched, all in relief, and posted an 0–2 win–loss record with a 5.04 earned run average (ERA). He allowed 46 hits and 25 bases on balls in 442/3 innings pitched, with 47 strikeouts. Willis was credited with one save, earned May 25 against the Los Angeles Angels. He also got into one game as a pinch runner.

== See also ==
- Florida Gators
- List of Florida Gators baseball players
- List of University of Florida Athletic Hall of Fame members
