= Dave Thies =

American baseball player (born 1937)

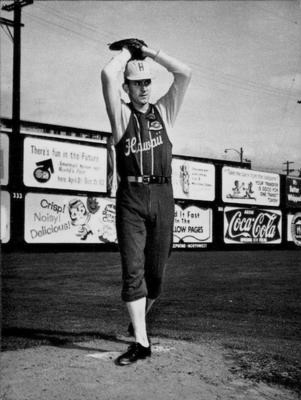
- Pitcher
- Born: March 21, 1937 (age 89); Minneapolis, Minnesota
- Batted: Right Threw: Right

MLB debut
- April 20, 1963, for the Kansas City Athletics

Last MLB appearance
- June 7, 1963, for the Kansas City Athletics

MLB statistics
- Win–loss record: 0–1
- Earned Run Average: 4.62
- Strikeouts: 9
- Stats at Baseball Reference

Teams
- Kansas City Athletics (1963)

David Robert Thies (born March 21, 1937) is an American former professional baseball pitcher who appeared in nine Major League Baseball (MLB) games for the 1963 Kansas City Athletics. Born in Minneapolis, Minnesota, he threw and batted right-handed and was listed as 6 feet 4 inches (1.93 m) tall and 205 pounds (93 kg).

Thies graduated from DeLaSalle High School and Saint Mary's University of Minnesota (Class of 1959), where he played baseball and basketball. He signed with the Athletics in 1959 and spent his entire six-season pro career in the Kansas City organization. In 1961, Thies' best minor league campaign, he won 15 games and lost seven for the Triple-A Hawaii Islanders of the Pacific Coast League, with 11 complete games and two shutouts.

In 1963, he spent the first weeks of the major-league season on the Kansas City roster, making seven relief appearances and two starts. In his first start, May 4 at Municipal Stadium against the Boston Red Sox, Thies was staked to an 11–3 lead — thanks, in part, to his two-for-two performance at the plate. Thies drove in a run with a single in his first at bat, then doubled in his second plate appearance, scoring a run himself, the Athletics' eighth of the game. But, on the mound, Thies could not complete the fourth inning. He was relieved by Bill Fischer after allowing four hits and one earned run in 32/3 innings pitched. Fischer shut down the Red Sox for another 11/3 innings and received credit for the win in Kansas City's rain-shortened, 14–3 triumph. Thies' second starting assignment occurred June 1, at District of Columbia Stadium against the Washington Senators. After shutting out the Senators in his first two innings, Thies gave up four earned runs in the third, including a three-run home run to Don Lock. He was removed for a pinch hitter in the fifth inning, and absorbed the 9–1 Kansas City loss, the only decision of his big league career.

After his last MLB appearance on June 7, Thies returned to the minor leagues and pitched into 1964 for the Athletics' Triple-A affiliates. In his nine big-league games, Thies allowed 26 hits and 12 bases on balls in 251/3 innings pitched, with nine strikeouts, two hit batsmen and one wild pitch. At the plate, he batted .333 on the strength of his May 4, 1963, game against the Red Sox, with six total at bats and two hits.

He was elected to the Saint Mary's University of Minnesota's Athletics Hall of Fame in 1972.
