= Dave Wickersham =

American baseball player (1935–2022)

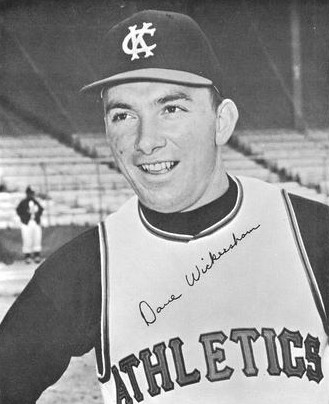
- Wickersham in 1962
- Pitcher
- Born: September 27, 1935; Erie, Pennsylvania, U.S.
- Died: June 18, 2022 (aged 86); Overland Park, Kansas, U.S.
- Batted: Right Threw: Right

MLB debut
- September 18, 1960, for the Kansas City Athletics

Last MLB appearance
- July 26, 1969, for the Kansas City Royals

MLB statistics
- Win–loss record: 68–57
- Earned run average: 3.66
- Strikeouts: 638
- Stats at Baseball Reference

Teams
- Kansas City Athletics (1960–1963); Detroit Tigers (1964–1967); Pittsburgh Pirates (1968); Kansas City Royals (1969)

David Clifford Wickersham (September 27, 1935 – June 18, 2022) was an American professional baseball pitcher. He played ten seasons in Major League Baseball (MLB) for the Kansas City Athletics, Detroit Tigers, Pittsburgh Pirates, and Kansas City Royals from 1960 to 1969.

== Early life ==
Wickersham was born in Erie, Pennsylvania, on September 27, 1935. He attended high school in East Springfield, where he excelled in several sports. He attended Taylor University. He later attended Ohio University, where he played with the Ohio Bobcats for two years. He was signed as an amateur free agent by the Pittsburgh Pirates before the 1955 season.

== Career ==
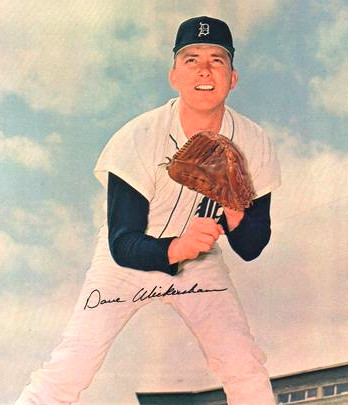
Wickersham in 1966

Wickersham played six seasons in the minor leagues from 1955 to 1960. He was acquired by the Kansas City Athletics in the 1959 minor league draft. He made his MLB debut for the franchise on September 18, 1960, nine days before his 25th birthday, pitching two innings, giving up an earned run, and striking out one in a 9–2 loss against the Cleveland Indians. In 1962, he posted an 11–4 win–loss record and led American League pitchers with a .733 winning percentage, and went 12–15 with a 3.78 earned run average (ERA) the following year. He was traded along with Jerry Lumpe and Ed Rakow from the Athletics to the Detroit Tigers for Rocky Colavito, Bob Anderson and $50,000 on November 18, 1963.

Wickersham enjoyed his most productive season for Detroit in 1964, when he went 19–12 with a 3.44 ERA and posted career-numbers in strikeouts (164), starts (36), complete games (11), appearances (40), and innings pitched (254.0). He was in consideration that year in the American League MVP vote. His 19 victories also was a career-mark, missing a 20-win season due to an ejection in his last start from a ballgame which was tied 1–1 in the 7th inning. Mickey Lolich relieved him and earned a 4–2 win. Wickersham was ejected after calling time out three times to try to keep a base runner from advancing as Norm Cash argued with the call by Bill Valentine. Valentine later expressed regret for the call, saying he had been "too impulsive" in his ejection. However, Wickersham wrote him a letter in 2004, reassuring the ump that he made the right call, in an attempt to relieve him of his burden.

Wickersham also pitched for the Pittsburgh Pirates and Kansas City Royals. He was traded by the Tigers to the Pirates for Dennis Ribant on November 28, 1967. He played his final major league game on July 26, 1969, at the age of 33. Over his 10-season MLB career, Wickersham posted a 68–57 record with 638 strikeouts and a 3.66 ERA in 1,123 innings, including 29 complete games, five shutouts and 18 saves. Notably, he was one of four players (along with fellow pitchers Aurelio Monteagudo, Moe Drabowsky, and Ken Sanders) to play for both Kansas City-based major league teams, the Athletics and Royals.

In 1989, Wickersham was inducted into the Pennsylvania Sports Hall of Fame.

== Personal life ==
Wickersham married Carol Sue Larson in 1964. They remained married for 48 years until her death from cancer in 2012. Together, they had four children: Davey, Carey, Mandy, and Matthew.

Wickersham died on June 18, 2022, at the age of 86.
