= Héctor Martínez (outfielder) =

Cuban baseball player (1939-1999)

- Centerfielder
- Born: May 11, 1939; Las Villas, Cuba
- Died: December 14, 1999 (aged 60); Havana, Cuba
- Batted: Right Threw: Right

MLB debut
- September 30, 1962, for the Kansas City Athletics

Last MLB appearance
- June 4, 1963, for the Kansas City Athletics

MLB statistics
- Batting average: .267
- Home runs: 1
- Runs batted in: 3

Teams
- Kansas City Athletics (1962–1963)

Rodolfo Héctor Martínez (May 11, 1939 – December 14, 1999) was a Cuban baseball player who played in professional baseball on the North American mainland in 1957–1958, 1960–1964, and 1966–1967, mostly in the Kansas City Athletics' minor league system. He was an outfielder who threw and batted right-handed, stood 5 feet 10 inches (1.78 m) tall and weighed 160 pounds (73 kg). During his career, he had two separate trials in Major League Baseball with the 1962–1963 Athletics, appearing in seven games played, and making four hits in 15 at bats. He was born in Las Villas (Cuba).

Martínez' two most successful professional seasons came with the Albuquerque Dukes — in 1960, when they played in the Class D Sophomore League, and 1962, when the Dukes were members of the Double-A Texas League. In the former season, Martínez batted .310 and was named the second baseman of the Sophomore League's all-star team. In 1962, Martínez batted .352 with 68 runs batted in in only 83 games for the TL Dukes.

He made one Major League appearance at the tail end of the 1962 campaign, striking out as a pinch hitter on September 30. In 1963, he had a six-game May–June tenure with the Athletics, hitting a home run off Ken McBride in his second MLB at bat on May 24. Martínez' only three starts as an MLB outfielder came May 24–26, 1963, against the Los Angeles Angels at Chavez Ravine. He spent most of that season with the Triple-A Portland Beavers.

Héctor Martínez died in Cuba in December 1999 at the age of 60.
