= Jerry Lumpe =

American baseball player (1933–2014)

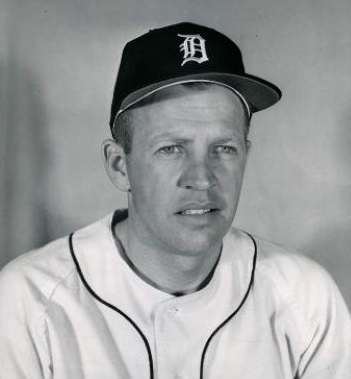
- Lumpe in 1967
- Second baseman
- Born: June 2, 1933; Lincoln, Missouri, U.S.
- Died: August 15, 2014 (aged 81); Springfield, Missouri, U.S.
- Batted: Left Threw: Right

MLB debut
- April 17, 1956, for the New York Yankees

Last MLB appearance
- October 1, 1967, for the Detroit Tigers

MLB statistics
- Batting average: .268
- Home runs: 47
- Runs batted in: 454
- Stats at Baseball Reference

Teams
- New York Yankees (1956–1959); Kansas City Athletics (1959–1963); Detroit Tigers (1964–1967)

Career highlights and awards
- All-Star (1964); World Series champion (1958)

Jerry Dean Lumpe (/ˈlʌmpiː/ LUMP-ee; June 2, 1933 – August 15, 2014) was an American professional baseball player and coach. He had a 12-season career in Major League Baseball, primarily as a second baseman, for the New York Yankees (1956–1959), Kansas City Athletics (1959–1963) and Detroit Tigers (1964–1967), played in two World Series, and was selected to the 1964 American League All-Star team. Named for National Baseball Hall of Fame pitcher Jerome "Dizzy" Dean, Lumpe was born in Lincoln, Missouri. He batted left-handed, threw right-handed, and was listed as 6 feet 2 inches (1.88 m) tall and 175 pounds (79 kg).

== Early life ==
Lumpe was born on June 2, 1933, in Lincoln, Missouri, to W.J. "Pete" and Anna Lumpe, and was raised in Warsaw, Missouri. His father was a St. Louis Cardinals baseball fan, and gave his son the middle name Dean, after Cardinals pitching great, Dizzy Dean.

Lumpe attended Warsaw High School, where he played basketball, graduating in 1951. He was an excellent high school basketball player. The high school did not have a baseball team, and he played for the Warsaw Junior American Legion baseball team, and played youth baseball for the Sedalia Chiefs of the Ban Johnson League.

In 1951, Lumpe was signed by scout Tom Greenwade to play with the Yankees as a shortstop. Greenwade was the same scout who earlier signed future Yankee Hall of Fame great Mickey Mantle. Lumpe began in the Yankees minor league system in 1951, but also attended college at Southwest Missouri State College (SMS; now Missouri State University).

Lumpe and future MLB teammate Norm Siebern were basketball players together for SMS, where they won two NAIA Championships in 1952 and 1953, although both needed to miss some tournament games (including the title games) to report to baseball spring training camp. Yankees manager Casey Stengel had ordered them to spring training in 1953, but they played in a couple tournament games after their coach negotiated with Stengel. Those teams have been inducted into the Missouri State University Athletics Hall of Fame. Lumpe maintained strong ties to the university and died in 2014 in Springfield, Missouri, the school's home, where he had been a longtime resident.

Lumpe was drafted into the U.S. Army in 1953, and played baseball for the Fort Leonard Wood team that won the National Baseball Congress championship. He did not play professional baseball in 1954.

== Playing career ==
=== New York Yankees ===
Lumpe rose through the Yankee farm system during the early 1950s, although he missed part of the 1953 and all of the 1954 minor league seasons while performing military service. In 1952, he played a full season for the Class-C Joplin Miners, and had a .293 batting average. His next full season came in 1955, playing for the Double-A Birmingham Barons, where Lumpe hit .301 and scored 94 runs, while playing shortstop. In 1956, he played shortstop for the Triple-A Richmond Virginians, batting .279 in 129 games.

He made the Bombers' roster for the first time in 1956, appearing in 20 games, as a member of the expanded early-season 28-man squad (though the number 28 was formally instituted in 1957 and was greater in 1956), and the post-September-1 40-man allotment. He started 14 games as the Yankees' shortstop, and played in one game at third base; batting .258.

He began 1957 at Richmond, batting .297 in 98 games. Unlike prior years he played third base, not shortstop. He was recalled to New York in July. With another young player, Bobby Richardson, installed as the club's second baseman, and Gil McDougald and Tony Kubek at shortstop, Lumpe started 21 games at third base, and appeared in 40 contests, hitting a robust .340 with 35 hits in 101 at bats.

He also appeared in three games of the 1957 World Series as the Yankees' starting third baseman in Games 3, 5 and 6. Lumpe collected four hits, all singles, in 14 at bats (including three additional appearances as a pinch hitter), and two runs batted in, but the Milwaukee Braves triumphed in seven games. In 1958, his first full year as a major leaguer, Lumpe earned a world championship ring. He appeared in 81 games, with 54 starts at third base, and hit his first three MLB home runs, as the Yankees won another American League pennant. In the 1958 World Series, a rematch with the Braves, he again was the Yankees' starting third baseman in three games, including the decisive Game 7, won by New York 6–2, for the 18th title in the team's history.

=== Kansas City Athletics ===
But Lumpe could not break into the Yankees' regular lineup. In 1959, again beginning the season as a utility infielder, he was hitting only .222 in 18 games when he was dealt to the second-division Kansas City Athletics on May 26 with pitchers Johnny Kucks and Tom Sturdivant for outfielder Héctor López and pitcher Ralph Terry. Lumpe started 54 games as Kansas City's second baseman and 47 as their shortstop, although he still showed rust at the plate, hitting only .243 with the Athletics in 108 games.

In 1960, Lumpe's first year as a starting second baseman (playing 127 games at second base and only 14 at shortstop), he began to find his stride. He raised his batting average to .271 and led his club in hits with 156. He had a .982 fielding percentage at second base, third highest among American League second basemen; and was fourth in putouts, fifth in assists and fifth in double plays turned among second basemen.

His best two offensive seasons came in 1961 and 1962, as he held down the right side of the Kansas City infield with first baseman Siebern, his teammate in college and with the Yankees. In 1961, Lumpe batted .293 with 167 hits, including nine triples, second in the American League. Then, in 1962, he batted .301, with ten home runs, 89 runs scored, and 83 runs batted in (RBIs). He was second in the league in hits with 193, second again in triples (ten), fifth in doubles (34) and eighth in batting average. All were personal bests, and Lumpe finished 25th in voting for the Junior Circuit's MVP race. His fielding percentage at second base in 1961 was .978 (fourth best in the AL), and .980 in 1962 (second best in the AL).

=== Detroit Tigers ===
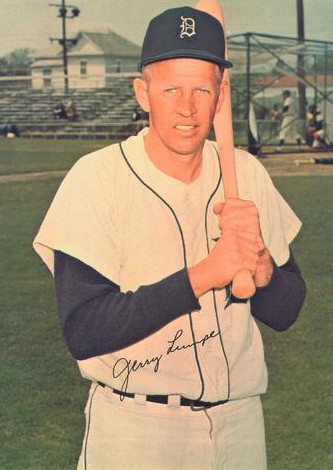
Lumpe, circa 1966

After a solid 1963 campaign with Kansas City, when he batted .271 in 157 games, and had a full season career high .988 fielding percentage in a league leading 155 games at second base (barely behind the league leader Nellie Fox who had the same .988 percentage), he was traded along with Dave Wickersham and Ed Rakow to the Detroit Tigers for Rocky Colavito, Bob Anderson and $50,000 on November 18. The lowly Athletics were making room for young second baseman Dick Green, who would become a fixture on the Oakland Athletics' early 1970s dynasty.

Lumpe, in turn, became the first-string second baseman for the first-division Tigers, playing alongside shortstop Dick McAuliffe. He started 156 games at second base in 1964, leading all American League second basemen along with Bobby Knoop, and was also in the top five among AL second basemen, in putouts, assists and double plays turned. Lumpe was named to the 1964 AL All-Star team as a reserve behind his former Yankee teammate Richardson. Lumpe did not appear in the July 7 contest at Shea Stadium, won by the National League on Johnny Callison's walk-off home run.

Lumpe also was a regular for the Tigers in both 1965 and 1966, although his offensive production began to fall off as he approached his mid thirties, while his fielding percentage remained strong. In 1967, the year of a feverish, four-team pennant race featuring the Tigers, Chicago White Sox, Minnesota Twins and Boston Red Sox, McAuliffe moved over from shortstop to become the club's second baseman (starting 123 games). Lumpe hit .232 in 81 contests, with only 59 appearances in the field, and 31 starts at second base. He started the final game of the year on October 1 in the second game of a doubleheader against the California Angels (the fourth game the two teams had played in two days); the Tigers needed to win to clinch a tie for the pennant with the Red Sox. He singled in his only at bat before being replaced by Dick Tracewski in the third inning. Detroit dropped the game, 8–5, handing the championship to the Red Sox (who won the games they needed to win against the Minnesota Twins over the same weekend). Lumpe retired as an active player upon his unconditional release 19 days later.

== Career statistics ==
In 12 MLB seasons, Jerry Lumpe played in 1,371 games and had 4,912 at bats. He scored 620 runs with 1,314 hits, 190 doubles, 52 triples, 47 home runs, 454 RBIs, 20 stolen bases, 428 walks, and a .268 average, .325 on-base percentage, .356 slugging percentage, 1,749 total bases, 57 sacrifice hits, 36 sacrifice flies and 21 intentional walks. Defensively, he recorded a .980 fielding percentage playing at second and third base and shortstop. In 12 World Series games (1957–1958), Lumpe collected six hits, all singles, in 26 at bats (.231), with two runs batted in. In the field, at third base, he handled 15 total chances without committing an error.

Lumpe returned to the game for one season, 1971, as the first-base coach of the Oakland Athletics on the staff of his former Kansas City teammate Dick Williams (who had also managed the 1967 Red Sox). The 1971 Athletics won the American League West Division championship on the strength of 101 regular-season victories, but dropped the 1971 ALCS to the Baltimore Orioles in three straight games. Lumpe then stepped down from the Oakland coaching staff, ending his MLB career.

== Post-baseball ==
After leaving baseball, he worked in banking and insurance. In 1994, Lumpe was inducted into the Missouri Sports Hall of Fame.

== Death ==
Lumpe died of cancer on August 15, 2014. He was survived by his wife of 60 years, Vivian, along with their children and grandchildren.

Preceded by Charley Lau	Oakland Athletics first base coach 1971	Succeeded by Jerry Adair
