= Kent Anderson (baseball) =

American baseball player (born 1963)

- Shortstop
- Born: August 12, 1963 (age 62); Florence, South Carolina, U.S.
- Batted: Right Threw: Right

MLB debut
- April 15, 1989, for the Anaheim Angels

Last MLB appearance
- September 6, 1990, for the Anaheim Angels

MLB statistics
- Batting average: .260
- Home runs: 1
- Runs batted in: 22
- Stats at Baseball Reference

Teams
- California Angels (1989–1990)

Kent McKay Anderson (born August 12, 1963) is an American former professional baseball player. He played in Major League Baseball (MLB) as an infielder from 1989 to 1990. Anderson graduated from Hudgens Academy High School in 1981 and was drafted in the 4th round of the 1984 Major League Baseball draft by the California Angels. In parts of two big league seasons, he batted .260/.318/.311. He is the brother of former MLB outfielder Mike Anderson.
