= Bob Dustal =

American baseball player (1935–2015)

- Pitcher
- Born: September 28, 1935; Sayreville, New Jersey, U.S.
- Died: November 30, 2015 (aged 80); Lakeland, Florida, U.S.
- Batted: Right Threw: Right

MLB debut
- April 9, 1963, for the Detroit Tigers

Last MLB appearance
- May 2, 1963, for the Detroit Tigers

MLB statistics
- Win–loss record: 0–1
- Earned run average: 9.00
- Innings: 6
- Stats at Baseball Reference

Teams
- Detroit Tigers (1963)

Robert Andrew Dustal (September 28, 1935 – November 30, 2015) was an American professional baseball player. A 6 ft (1.8 m), 172 lb (78 kg) right-handed pitcher whose professional career lasted for 14 seasons (1955–1968), Dustal appeared in seven Major League games as a relief pitcher for the 1963 Detroit Tigers. In his only decision, on April 20, 1963, at Fenway Park, he suffered an excruciating loss when he allowed a game-winning, two-run double to Román Mejías in the bottom of the 15th inning to give the Boston Red Sox a come-from-behind, 4–3 victory over his Tigers.

Dustal allowed nine runs, six of them earned, over six innings of relief, giving up ten hits and five bases on balls. He won 116 games over the course of his minor league career, most of it played in the Tiger organization. He also managed in the Detroit farm system in the late 1960s.
