= Ben Glaspy =

American baseball player

- Outfielder
- Born: September 14, 1895; Woodford County, Kentucky, U.S.
- Died: May 8, 1963 (aged 67); Dayton, Ohio, U.S.

Negro league baseball debut
- 1926, for the Dayton Marcos

Last appearance
- 1926, for the Dayton Marcos

Teams
- Dayton Marcos (1926)

Benjamin Albert Glaspy (September 14, 1895 – May 8, 1963) was an American Negro league baseball outfielder in the 1920s.

A native of Woodford County, Kentucky, Glaspy played for the Dayton Marcos in 1926. He died in Dayton, Ohio in 1963 at age 67.
