= Pete Lovrich =

American baseball player (1942–2018)

- Pitcher
- Born: October 16, 1942; Blue Island, Illinois, U.S.
- Died: December 26, 2018 (aged 76); Mokena, Illinois, U.S.
- Batted: Right Threw: Right

MLB debut
- April 26, 1963, for the Kansas City Athletics

Last MLB appearance
- September 5, 1963, for the Kansas City Athletics

MLB statistics
- Win–loss record: 1–1
- Earned run average: 7.84
- Strikeouts: 16
- Stats at Baseball Reference

Teams
- Kansas City Athletics (1963)

Peter Lovrich (October 16, 1942 – December 26, 2018) was an American Major League Baseball pitcher who played for the Kansas City Athletics during the 1963 season.

Lovrich attended Arizona State University. The 6 ft 4 in (1.93 m), 200 lb (91 kg) right hander was the first former ASU Sun Devil player to reach Major League Baseball. Lovrich appeared in 20 games played for the 1963 Athletics, and gave up 25 hits and ten bases on balls, with 16 strikeouts, in 20 2/3 innings pitched. He started one game, August 23 against the Detroit Tigers, and lasted only one-third of an inning, giving up four earned runs in an eventual 17–2 defeat. However, his one victory came in relief on July 15 against the eventual American League champion New York Yankees. He pitched a scoreless 12th inning, and bunted the winning run into scoring position during the bottom of the frame.

Lovrich died December 26, 2018.
