= Larry Foster (baseball) =

American baseball player (1937–2023)

- Pitcher
- Born: December 24, 1937; Lansing, Michigan, U.S.
- Died: May 7, 2023 (aged 85); Whitehall, Michigan, U.S.
- Batted: Left Threw: Right

MLB debut
- September 18, 1963, for the Detroit Tigers

Last MLB appearance
- September 18, 1963, for the Detroit Tigers

MLB statistics
- Win–loss record: 0–0
- Earned run average: 13.50
- Strikeouts: 1
- Innings pitched: 2
- Stats at Baseball Reference

Teams
- Detroit Tigers (1963)

Larry Lynn Foster (December 24, 1937 – May 7, 2023) was an American professional baseball player. The right-handed pitcher attended Michigan State University before signing a professional contract with the Detroit Tigers prior to the 1958 season. He had an eight-season professional career, but appeared in only one Major League game for the Tigers on September 18, 1963. He batted left-handed, stood 6 feet (1.83 m) tall and weighed 185 pounds (84 kg).

In that game, against the Minnesota Twins at Metropolitan Stadium, Foster pitched the sixth and seventh innings in relief of Willie Smith. He gave up four hits and three earned runs, with a double by Don Mincher as the most damaging blow. He issued one walk and struck out one.

After retiring from baseball in 1965, Foster became a Lutheran pastor, at one point serving at Grace Lutheran Church in his home city of Lansing. and Lebanon Lutheran, Whitehall, Michigan, from 1975 to 1993.

Foster died on May 7, 2023, at the age of 85.
