= Lewis Means =

American baseball player (1898-1963)

- Catcher
- Born: December 14, 1898; Washington, Georgia, U.S.
- Died: November 17, 1963 (aged 64); Chicago, Illinois, U.S.
- Batted: Right Threw: Right

Negro league baseball debut
- 1920, for the Bacharach Giants

Last appearance
- 1928, for the Birmingham Black Barons

Teams
- Bacharach Giants (1920, 1922); Birmingham Black Barons (1923–1924); Bacharach Giants (1927); Birmingham Black Barons (1928)

Lemuel Lewis Means (December 14, 1898 – November 17, 1963) was an American Negro league catcher in the 1920s.

A native of Washington, Georgia, Means attended Morris Brown College. He made his Negro leagues debut in 1920 with the Bacharach Giants, and finished his career in 1928 with the Birmingham Black Barons. Means died in Chicago, Illinois in 1963 at age 64.
