= Ed Rakow =

American baseball player (1935–2000)

- Pitcher
- Born: May 30, 1935; Pittsburgh, Pennsylvania, U.S.
- Died: August 26, 2000 (aged 65); West Palm Beach, Florida, U.S.
- Batted: Switch Threw: Right

MLB debut
- April 22, 1960, for the Los Angeles Dodgers

Last MLB appearance
- September 28, 1967, for the Atlanta Braves

MLB statistics
- Win–loss record: 36–47
- Earned run average: 4.33
- Strikeouts: 484
- Stats at Baseball Reference

Teams
- Los Angeles Dodgers (1960); Kansas City Athletics (1961–1963); Detroit Tigers (1964–1965); Atlanta Braves (1967)

Edward Charles Rakow (May 30, 1935 – August 26, 2000), nicknamed "Rock", was an American professional baseball player. The right-handed pitcher appeared in 195 games in Major League Baseball during all or parts of seven seasons (1960–65; 1967) as a member of the Los Angeles Dodgers, Kansas City Athletics, Detroit Tigers and Atlanta Braves. He stood 5 feet 11 inches (1.80 m) tall and weighed 178 pounds (81 kg).

== Formative years ==
Born in Pittsburgh, Pennsylvania on May 30, 1935 or 1936, Rakow signed with the Brooklyn Dodgers during the team's last season in Brooklyn, 1957. After three minor league seasons, he spent part of the 1960 season on the Los Angeles Dodgers' roster. He worked in nine games, two as a starting pitcher, and lost his only decision, giving up 18 earned runs, 30 hits and 11 bases on balls in 22 innings pitched. The following spring, he was traded to the Athletics, where he would appear in 121 games over the next three years.

== Career ==
In 1962, Rakow led the A's in games started (35), innings pitched (235 1/3), complete games (11), shutouts (2), and games won (14). He led the American League in losses (17), and earned runs (111); he finished eighth in the league in strikeouts (159, which led the Athletics).

On November 18, 1963, Rakow was traded with Jerry Lumpe and Dave Wickersham from the Athletics to the Detroit Tigers for Rocky Colavito, Bob Anderson and $50,000 In 1964, Rakow's first year as a Tiger, he lowered his earned run average to a career-best 3.72 in 34 games and 174 1/3 innings pitched in 1964, but it was his last full season in the majors. Detroit farmed him out to Triple-A in May 1965.

Rakow subsequently remained in the minor leagues for the remainder of his career, except for the 17 games he played with the Atlanta Braves during the latter part of the 1967 season.

Following his twelfth pro season, Rakow retired in 1968.

Rakow allowed 771 hits and 304 bases on balls in 761 1/3 big-league innings pitched, with 484 strikeouts, 20 complete games, and 5 saves. Of his 195 MLB appearances, 90 came as a starting pitcher.

== Later years ==
In 1989, at age 54, Rakow was a player-coach for the West Palm Beach Tropics of the Senior Professional Baseball Association.
