= Frank Ray (baseball) =

American baseball player (1909–1963)

- Outfielder
- Born: April 28, 1909; Athens, Georgia, U.S.
- Died: August 6, 1963 (aged 54); Tuskegee, Alabama, U.S.

Negro league baseball debut
- 1932, for the Montgomery Grey Sox

Last appearance
- 1932, for the Montgomery Grey Sox
- Stats at Baseball Reference

Teams
- Montgomery Grey Sox (1932)

Frank Evans Ray (April 28, 1909 – August 6, 1963) was an American Negro league outfielder in the 1930s.

A native of Athens, Georgia, Ray attended Morris Brown College and played for the Montgomery Grey Sox in 1932. In 26 recorded games, he posted 16 hits in 95 plate appearances. Ray died in Tuskegee, Alabama in 1963 at age 54.
