= Ollie Waldon =

American baseball player

- Third baseman
- Born: March 7, 1911; Itasca, TX
- Died: September 16, 1963 (aged 52); Itasca, TX
- Batted: Right Threw: Right

Negro league baseball debut
- May 7, 1944, for the Chicago American Giants

Last appearance
- 1944, for the Chicago American Giants

Teams
- Chicago American Giants (1944)

American baseball player

Ollie Waldon is an American former Negro league third baseman who played in the 1940s.

Waldon played for the Chicago American Giants in 1944 at age 33, debuting on May 7. In 11 recorded games, he posted five hits in 29 plate appearances.
