= John Wojcik =

American baseball player (born 1942)

- Leftfielder
- Born: April 6, 1942 (age 84); Olean, New York
- Batted: Left Threw: Right

MLB debut
- September 9, 1962, for the Kansas City Athletics

Last MLB appearance
- June 13, 1964, for the Kansas City Athletics

MLB statistics
- Batting average: .218
- Home runs: 0
- Runs batted in: 11
- Stats at Baseball Reference

Teams
- Kansas City Athletics (1962–1964)

John Joseph Wojcik (born April 6, 1942) is an American former professional baseball player. He played parts of three seasons for the Kansas City Athletics of Major League Baseball, primarily as an outfielder.

Wojcik graduated from McKinley Vocational High School and Erie County Technical Institute where he played college baseball and college basketball. Wojcik's father and two of his brothers also played minor league baseball.

Wojcik batted left-handed, threw right-handed, and was listed as 6 feet (1.8 m) tall and weighing 170 pounds (77 kg). He was signed as an amateur free agent by the Athletics in 1961. He made his major league debut on September 9, 1962. In 148 career at bats, Wojcik collected 27 hits for a .218 batting average and had only four extra-base hits, all doubles.

Wojcik's professional baseball career ended in 1965 after five seasons.
