= Aurelio Monteagudo =

Cuban baseball player (1943–1990)

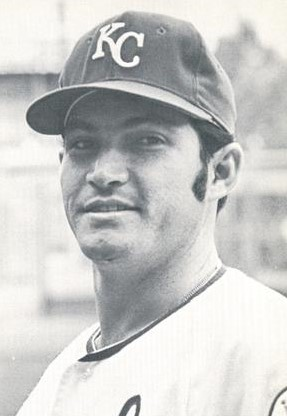
- Monteagudo in 1970
- Pitcher
- Born: November 19, 1943; Caibarién, Cuba
- Died: November 10, 1990 (aged 46); Ramos Arizpe, Mexico
- Batted: Right Threw: Right

MLB debut
- September 1, 1963, for the Kansas City Athletics

Last MLB appearance
- September 28, 1973, for the California Angels

MLB statistics
- Win–loss record: 3-7
- Earned run average: 5.05
- Strikeouts: 58
- Stats at Baseball Reference

Teams
- Kansas City Athletics (1963–1966); Houston Astros (1966); Chicago White Sox (1967); Kansas City Royals (1970); California Angels (1973)

Career highlights and awards
- Acereros de Monclova #28 retired

Member of the Venezuelan

Baseball Hall of Fame
- Induction: 2009

Aurelio Faustino Monteagudo Cintra (/aʊˈreɪli.oʊ mɒnteɪˈɡuːdoʊ/; November 19, 1943 – November 10, 1990), nicknamed "Monty", was a Cuban right-handed pitcher who played in Major League Baseball (MLB) for parts of seven seasons with the Kansas City Athletics, Houston Astros, Chicago White Sox, Kansas City Royals, and California Angels. He played Minor League Baseball during the course of 14 seasons, played in the Mexican Baseball League from 1974 to 1981, and played winter league baseball in Venezuela for 20 seasons. Monteagudo managed and coached in the minor leagues, principally in the California Angels' farm system, and in the Mexican Baseball League and Venezuelan winter ball. He was the son of former MLB player René Monteagudo.

== Early life ==
Monteagudo was born on November 19, 1943, in Caibarién, Villa Clara Province, Cuba. His father René Monteagudo had been scouted by the Washington Senator's Joe Cambria in Cuba, and played for the Senators (1938, 1940, 1944) and Philadelphia Phillies (1945) during Monteagudo's early childhood. Monteagudo attended Presbyterian High School. It is reported that he moved with his family to Venezuela after Fidel Castro's rise to power in 1959. He later lived in Barquisimeto, Lara, Venezuela with his wife and family.

It has also been reported that he lived in Cuba until 1963. Monteagudo himself said that he was living in Cuba in 1961, and received permission from Castro to play in the United States. After leaving Cuba to play in the United States, he did not return to Cuba. He was later offered an opportunity to play winter baseball in Venezuela, where he met his future wife and was offered citizenship. He has also been reported as saying that when his 1963 minor league season ended, the Kansas City Athletics wanted him to join the team in September, but he wanted to return home to Cuba and had to be convinced to stay in America to play for the A's that September. In May 1971, it was reported that his parents, two brothers, and his sister were all living in Havana, Cuba, and he had not seen them in 11 years.

== Professional career ==
=== Kansas City A's organization ===
In 1961, the Kansas City Athletics signed Monteagudo to a professional contract when he was 16-years old. He was nicknamed "Monty" during his early minor league career. In 1961, he was assigned to the Albuquerque Dukes in the Sophomore League. He had an 11–4 win-loss record, leading the team in wins and winning percentage. Monteagudo started 21 games, completing 12. He had a 4.03 earned run average (ERA) in 154 innings pitched, with 187 strikeouts and 45 bases on balls. He was selected to play in the Sophomore League All-Star Game in 1961.

Monteagudo split most of the 1962 season between the Class B Lewiston Broncos of the Northwest League and the Single-A Binghamton Triplets of the Eastern League. At Lewiston he had a 5–2 record with a 3.55 ERA and 62 strikeouts and 31 walks in 66 innings pitched. With Binghamton, Monteagudo was 1–3, with a 5.30 ERA. He had 54 strikeouts and 25 walks in 56 innings pitched. He also pitched 18 innings over six games for the Dukes, now part of the Double-A Texas League; with an ERA of 8.50.

In 1963, he pitched in 31 games for the Triple-A Portland Beavers of the Pacific Coast League (PCL). He started 25 games and had a 10–13 record, with a 3.80 ERA. He had 205 strikeouts and 45 walks in 173 innings pitched. Monteagudo's 205 strikeouts were second highest in the PCL that season. He was called up to the Kansas City A's and made his MLB debut on September 1, 1963, pitching one inning against the Los Angeles Angels. Overall, Monteagudo appeared in four games for the A's as a relief pitcher, with a 2.57 ERA in seven innings pitched.

Monteagudo began the 1964 season with the A's, but was optioned to the Triple-A Dallas Rangers of the PCL in June. On the A's, he pitched in 11 games, starting six, with an 0–4 record and 8.90 ERA. With the Rangers, Monteagudo pitched in 19 games, starting 17. Monteagudo had a 10–5 record with a 2.79 ERA. He had 108 strikeouts and 48 walks in 116 innings pitched. In 1965, he played for the Vancouver Mounties in the PCL, starting all 27 games in which he appeared. Monteagudo had a 11–10 record and 3.32 ERA. He had 128 strikeouts and 78 walks in 171 innings pitched. He was called up to the A's in September 1965, where he pitched seven innings in four relief appearances, with a 3.86 ERA.

On September 8, 1965, the A's Bert Campaneris became the first player in MLB history to play all nine positions in the field. He pitched in the eighth inning and played catcher in the ninth inning (being knocked out of the game by Ed Kirkpatrick on the final out). Monteagudo was the A's pitcher in the ninth inning when Campaneris was the catcher.

Monteagudo began the 1966 season with the A's. He appeared in six games as a relief pitcher, with a 2.84 ERA. The A's sold Monteagudo's contract rights to the Houston Astros on May 17, 1966 for $20,000. During his time with the A's over parts of the 1963 to 1966 seasons, Monteagudo appeared in 25 games, starting six, with a 6.21 ERA and an 0–4 record in 58 innings pitched.

=== Houston Astros organization, Cincinnati Reds organization, and Chicago White Sox organization ===
After coming to the Astros in May 1966, Monteagudo appeared in 10 games as a relief pitcher. He had a 4.70 ERA in 15.1 innings pitched. In late July 1966, the Astros sent Monteagudo to their Triple-A farm team in the PCL, the Oklahoma City 89ers, and brought up Carroll Sembera to replace him. He started eight games for the 89ers, with a 4–2 record and 2.29 ERA in 59 innings pitched. He had 58 strikeouts and 22 bases on balls. In late September 1966, the Astros sold Monteagudo's contract rights to the Cincinnati Reds. At the end of the season, he received Venezuelan citizenship. The Reds signed Monteagudo in February 1967, but in mid-May sold his contract rights conditionally to the Indianapolis Indians, the Chicago White Sox Triple-A affiliate in the PCL.

With Indianapolis in 1967, Monteagudo appeared in 24 games, starting 19. He had 4–8 record and 3.55 ERA. He was called up to pitch in one game for the Chicago White Sox that season. He started the second game of a doubleheader on July 16, 1967, pitching only 1.1 innings. The White Sox released Monteagudo less than one week later, and the Reds signed him again the same day.

In 1968, he signed with the Hawaii Islanders, a White Sox affiliate in the PCL, and appeared in seven games with them. The Reds has conditionally sent Monteagudo to the Islanders, and he was returned to the Reds organization in May, joining the Reds Double-A affiliate, the Asheville Tourists. Monteagudo pitched in 17 games for Asheville, starting 13 games. He had an 8–2 record, with a 2.72 ERA and 89 strikeouts in 94 innings pitched. He later played in 10 games for the Indianapolis Indians that season, which had become a Reds' affiliate. He played in 17 games for Indianapolis in 1969, and was traded in June to the St. Louis Cardinals for Dennis Ribant.

=== St. Louis Cardinals organization, Kansas City Royals, San Diego Padres organization, California Angels ===
Monteagudo finished the 1969 season with the Tulsa Oilers, the Cardinals' Triple-A affiliate in the American Association, pitching in 20 games. On December 1, 1969, the Kansas City Royals selected Monteagudo in the minor league draft. In early January 1970, the Royals sold Monteagudo's rights to the San Diego Padres, but he was returned to the Royals in early April 1970. Monteagudo began the 1970 season with the Triple-A Omaha Royals in the American Association. He pitched 14 games in relief, with a 3–1 record and three saves. He had a 2.57 ERA in 28 innings pitched with 28 strikeouts and eight walks.

The Royals brought him up in June 1970 to replace Wally Bunker who had been placed on the disabled list. It had been nearly three years since Monteagudo had last appeared in an MLB game. He pitched in 21 games, all in relief. He had a 1–1 record with a 2.96 ERA in 27.1 innings pitched. On June 15, he was credited with his first MLB victory. The Royals returned Monteagudo to Omaha, where he played the entire 1971 season. He appeared in 46 games, all in relief, and had 12–4 record with 11 saves and a 2.60 ERA. In 83 innings pitched, he had 66 strikeouts and 36 walks. He was tied for second in saves in the American Association that season. Monteagudo was selected as a member of the 1971 American Association All-Star Team.

In late November 1971, the Milwaukee Brewers selected Monteagudo in the Rule 5 draft, but released him at the end of March 1972. He signed with the San Diego Padres the same day. He was assigned to the Hawaiian Islanders, now a Padres' Triple-A affiliate, where he played the entire 1972 season. Monteagudo pitched in 58 games; all in relief. He was 8–6 with 21 saves and a 2.37 ERA. In 95 innings pitched, he had 83 strikeouts and 37 walks. He led the Pacific Coast League in saves. Monteagudo was selected to play on the Caribbean all-star team that participated in the Kodak World Baseball Classic in September 1972 in Hawaii. Although he had been a relief pitcher that year, he started and pitched 8.2 innings against the Tidewater Tides during that tournament, winning the game 2–0.

In 1973, Monteagudo appeared in 19 games for the Islanders. On June 10, the Padres traded him to the California Angels for Ron Clark. He was originally assigned to the Triple-A Salt Lake City Angels of the PCL. He pitched in 20 games for Salt Lake City that season. The Angels called him up in late July. He was 2–1 with a 4.20 ERA and three saves in 15 relief appearances. This was his last season in MLB or American minor league baseball (other than a few minor league games in 1983 when he was primarily a pitching coach). He played his final MLB game on September 28, 1973.

Monteagudo was traded along with Chris Coletta from the Angels to the Philadelphia Phillies for Denny Doyle at the Winter Meetings on December 6, 1973, completing a transaction from four months earlier on August 14 when Philadelphia purchased Billy Grabarkewitz's contract from California. He pitched during the Phillies' preseason in 1974. In mid-April 1974, the Phillies sold Monteagudo's contract rights to Pericos de Puebla in the Mexican League.

Monteagudo never played an entire MLB season. In the seven seasons in which he played MLB baseball, Monteagudo compiled a 3–7 record with 58 strikeouts, a 5.05 ERA, four saves, and 132 innings pitched in 72 games (65 as a reliever).

=== Mexican League and Venezuela ===
In 1974 with Pericos de Puebla in the Mexican League, Monteagudo had a 12–0 record, with three saves. He appeared in 20 games, starting 15, and had a 3.45 ERA in 120 innings, with 103 strikeouts and 31 walks. The following season with Pericos de Puebla, he was 15–9, with a 3.02 ERA while starting 26 of the 27 games in which he appeared. In 1976, he was 15–8, with three saves and a 2.56 ERA. He had 133 strikeouts and 37 walks in 193 innings pitched.

From 1977 to 1979, he pitched for Mineros de Coahuila. He was 16–18 in 1977, with a 2.76 ERA. He pitched 264 innings, then a career high at age 33. He broke his innings pitched career-high in 1978, pitching 275 innings. Monteagudo led the league in strikeouts (222) and had a 17–12 record, with a 2.26 ERA; starting 29 of the 42 games in which he appeared. He had his best Mexican League season in 1979, pitching for Coahuila, with a 21–12 record and 2.45 ERA. On May 19, 1979, Monteagudo pitched a no-hitter game against Nuevo Laredo.

He split the 1980 season, which was cut short by a players' strike, between Acereros de Monclova and Osos Negros de Toluca. When Toluca disbanded after the 1980 season, he was signed by the Rojos del Aguila de Veracruz. However, he did not play for the Rojos in 1981, but joined the Tecolotes de los dos Laredos. The 37-yeard old Monteagudo was selected as the Tecolotes' opening day pitcher that season. Monteagudo also played in the Mexican League with the Los Rieleros de Aguascalientes.

Monteagudo also played 20 seasons in the Venezuelan Professional Baseball League with five teams: Caracas (1963–68), Magallanes (1968), La Guaira (1968–74, 1976–82) and Portuguesa (1975), compiling a 79–81 record with 897 strikeouts and a 3.37 ERA. In 1970, he was named the most valuable player in the Caribbean Series, had a 2.11 ERA with La Guaira, and was selected to the Venezuelan League all-star team. On December 20, 1973, Monteagudo kept the Cardenales de Lara hitless for 8 2/3 innings until Faustino Zabala ruined the no-hitter with a single to center field.

During his career, Monteagudo is said to have thrown the screwball.

== Managing and coaching career ==
=== Minor leagues ===
In 1982, Monteagudo managed the Danville Suns, the Single-A affiliate of the California Angels in the Midwest League, for part of the season. He was the pitching coach for the Edmonton Trappers, the Angels Triple-A affiliate in the Pacific Coast League in 1983. During the season, because of a pitching staff shortage, the 39-year old Monteagudo was activated as a pitcher and pitched in four games. He was the winning pitcher in a July 4, 1983 game, allowing only one run in five innings.

He spent three more years coaching in the Angels minor league system. In 1984, he was pitching coach for the Peoria Chiefs of the Midwest League, under manager Joe Maddon. In 1985 and 1986, Monteagudo was a pitching coach under manager Maddon with the Midland Angels of the Double-A Texas League. In 1987, he became pitching coach of the Double-A Knoxville Blue Jays, the Toronto Blue Jays' affiliate in the Southern League. In 1988, the Boston Red Sox hired Monteagudo as a roving minor league pitching instructor.

=== Mexican League and Venezuela ===
He was a pitching coach in Venezuelan winter ball for Tiburones de la Guaira in 1985 and Cardenales de Lara in 1987. In 1988, Monteagudo managed the Acereros de Monoclova in the Mexican League. In 1989, he managed Rieleros de Aguascalientes in the Mexican League, until he was replaced in mid-June 1989. In 1990, Monteagudo was the manager of the Saraperos de Saltillo in the Mexican League.

== Honors ==
In 2009, Monteagudo was inducted into the Venezuelan Baseball Hall of Fame.

== Personal life and death ==
Monteagudo died on November 10, 1990. He was killed in a motor vehicle accident in Saltillo, Mexico nine days before his 47th birthday. He is reported to have died in Ramos Arizpe, Coahuila, Mexico, within Saltillo.

== See also ==
- List of Major League Baseball players from Cuba
- List of second-generation Major League Baseball players
