= Willie Smith (outfielder) =

American baseball player (1939–2006)

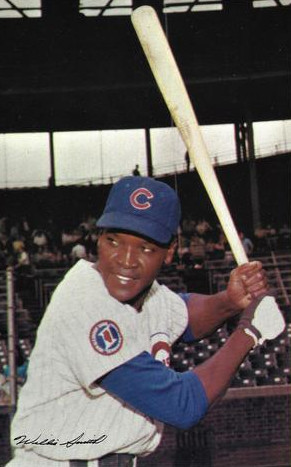
- Smith in 1968
- Pitcher / Outfielder
- Born: February 11, 1939; Anniston, Alabama, U.S.
- Died: January 16, 2006 (aged 66); Anniston, Alabama, U.S.
- Batted: Left Threw: Left

MLB debut
- June 18, 1963, for the Detroit Tigers

Last MLB appearance
- September 30, 1971, for the Cincinnati Reds

MLB statistics
- Batting average: .248
- Home runs: 46
- Runs batted in: 211
- Win–loss record: 2–4
- Earned run average: 3.10
- Strikeouts: 39

NPB statistics
- Batting average: .259
- Home runs: 29
- Runs batted in: 90
- Stats at Baseball Reference

Teams
- Detroit Tigers (1963); Los Angeles/California Angels (1964–1966); Cleveland Indians (1967–1968); Chicago Cubs (1968–1970); Cincinnati Reds (1971); Nankai Hawks (1972–1973)

Willie Smith (February 11, 1939 – January 16, 2006), nicknamed "Wonderful Willie" was an American Major League Baseball pitcher and outfielder. After starting his career as a pitcher for the Detroit Tigers in 1963, Smith was converted to an outfielder in 1964 by the Los Angeles Angels, and remained an outfielder and pinch hitter for the Angels (through 1966), Cleveland Indians (1967–68), Chicago Cubs (1968–70) and Cincinnati Reds (1971). He also played two seasons in Japan for the Nankai Hawks (1972–73). Listed at 6 feet (1.8 m) tall and 182 pounds (83 kg), he threw and batted left-handed. He was born in Anniston, Alabama.

Smith began his professional career with the Negro league Birmingham Black Barons, where he was selected to play in the East–West All-Star Game in 1958 and 1959.

Smith was a highly regarded pitching prospect in the Detroit farm system. In 1963, playing for the Triple-A Syracuse Chiefs, he led the International League in winning percentage (.875) with a 14–2 won/loss mark, and posted a 2.11 earned run average. He also batted .380 (30 hits in 79 at bats), with one home run and 13 runs batted in.

Smith was still plying his trade on the mound when he was traded to the Angels for Julio Navarro on April 28, 1964. He had compiled a 1–4 record with an earned run average of 2.84 with the Angels in 31 2/3 innings pitched when Halo manager Bill Rigney shifted Smith to the outfield to get his bat in the lineup on a daily basis. Smith responded by hitting .301 that season (his career-best batting average) with 11 home runs and 51 RBI.

The pinnacle moment of Smith's 245-game stint with the Cubs was his one-out two-run walk-off homer to the right-field bleachers off Barry Lersch in an eleven-inning Opening Day 7–6 win over the Philadelphia Phillies at Wrigley Field on April 8, 1969. He was traded by the Cubs to the Reds for Danny Breeden on November 30, 1970.

In nine seasons, he played in 691 games and had 1,654 at bats, 410 hits, 46 home runs, 211 RBI, 20 stolen bases, 107 walks, and a slash line of .248/.295/.395. His record as a pitcher was 2–4 with a 3.10 ERA in 29 games; in 61 innings pitched spread over three MLB seasons, he allowed 60 hits and 24 bases on balls, with 39 strikeouts.

Smith died of an apparent heart attack in his hometown at the age of 66.

== See also ==
- List of Negro league baseball players who played in Major League Baseball
