= 1963 Boston Red Sox season =

Major League Baseball season

1963 Boston Red Sox
- League: American League
- Ballpark: Fenway Park
- City: Boston, Massachusetts
- Record: 76–85 (.472)
- League place: 7th
- Owners: Tom Yawkey
- President: Tom Yawkey
- General managers: Pinky Higgins
- Managers: Johnny Pesky
- Television: WHDH-TV, Ch. 5
- Radio: WHDH-AM 850 (Curt Gowdy, Ned Martin, Art Gleeson)
- Stats: ESPN.com; Baseball Reference

The 1963 Boston Red Sox season was the 63rd season in the franchise's Major League Baseball history. The Red Sox finished seventh in the American League (AL) with a record of 76 wins and 85 losses, 28 games behind the AL champion New York Yankees.

== Offseason ==
- November 26, 1962: Glenn Beckert was drafted from the Red Sox by the Chicago Cubs in the 1962 first-year draft.
- November 26, 1962: Joe Foy was drafted by the Boston Red Sox from the Minnesota Twins in the 1962 minor league draft.

== Regular season ==
=== Season standings ===
American League
Team	W	L	Pct.	GB	Home	Road
New York Yankees	104	57	.646	—	58‍–‍22	46‍–‍35
Chicago White Sox	94	68	.580	10½	49‍–‍33	45‍–‍35
Minnesota Twins	91	70	.565	13	48‍–‍33	43‍–‍37
Baltimore Orioles	86	76	.531	18½	48‍–‍33	38‍–‍43
Cleveland Indians	79	83	.488	25½	41‍–‍40	38‍–‍43
Detroit Tigers	79	83	.488	25½	47‍–‍34	32‍–‍49
Boston Red Sox	76	85	.472	28	44‍–‍36	32‍–‍49
Kansas City Athletics	73	89	.451	31½	36‍–‍45	37‍–‍44
Los Angeles Angels	70	91	.435	34	39‍–‍42	31‍–‍49
Washington Senators	56	106	.346	48½	31‍–‍49	25‍–‍57

=== Record vs. opponents ===
1963 American League record Sources:
Team	BAL	BOS	CWS	CLE	DET	KCA	LAA	MIN	NYY	WAS
Baltimore	—	7–11	7–11	10–8	13–5	9–9	9–9	9–9	7–11	15–3
Boston	11–7	—	8–10	10–8	9–9	7–11	9–8	7–11	6–12	9–9
Chicago	11–7	10–8	—	11–7	11–7	12–6	10–8	8–10	8–10	13–5
Cleveland	8–10	8–10	7–11	—	10–8	11–7	10–8	5–13	7–11	13–5
Detroit	5–13	9–9	7–11	8–10	—	13–5	12–6	8–10	8–10	9–9
Kansas City	9–9	11–7	6–12	7–11	5–13	—	10–8	9–9	6–12	10–8
Los Angeles	9–9	8–9	8–10	8–10	6–12	8–10	—	9–9	5–13	9–9
Minnesota	9–9	11–7	10–8	13–5	10–8	9–9	9–9	—	6–11	14–4
New York	11–7	12–6	10–8	11–7	10–8	12–6	13–5	11–6	—	14–4
Washington	3–15	9–9	5–13	5–13	9–9	8–10	9–9	4–14	4–14	—

=== Opening Day lineup ===
2	Chuck Schilling	2B
1	Ed Bressoud	SS
8	Carl Yastrzemski	LF
7	Dick Stuart	1B
4	Román Mejías	CF
6	Lou Clinton	RF
11	Frank Malzone	3B
10	Bob Tillman	C
27	Bill Monbouquette	P

=== Notable transactions ===
- April 1963: Bob Smith was purchased by the Red Sox from the St. Louis Cardinals.
- August 14, 1963: Jim Lonborg was signed as an amateur free agent by the Red Sox.

=== Roster ===
1963 Boston Red Sox
Roster
Pitchers: 18 Gene Conley; 14 Ike Delock; 21 Arnold Earley; 20 Mike Fornieles; 20 Bob Heffner; 28 Hal Kolstad; 36 Jack Lamabe; 27 Bill Monbouquette; 23 Dave Morehead; 31 Chet Nichols Jr.; 17 Dick Radatz; 49 Pete Smith; 29 Jerry Stephenson; 29 Bob Turley; 26 Earl Wilson; 19 Wilbur Wood	Catchers: 5 Russ Nixon; 10 Bob Tillman; Infielders: 1 Ed Bressoud; 15 Billy Gardner; 11 Frank Malzone; 12 Félix Mantilla; 38 Rico Petrocelli; 2 Chuck Schilling; 7 Dick Stuart; 16 Dick Williams	Outfielders: 6 Lou Clinton; 3 Gary Geiger; 25 Jim Gosger; 4 Román Mejías; 8 Carl Yastrzemski	Manager: 22 Johnny Pesky; Coaches: 34 Harry Dorish (Pitching); 35 Billy Herman (Third base); 33 Al Lakeman (Bullpen); 32 Harry Malmberg (First base)

== Player stats ==
= Indicates team leader

=== Batting ===
==== Starters by position ====
Note: Pos = Position; G = Games played; AB = At bats; H = Hits; Avg. = Batting average; HR = Home runs; RBI = Runs batted in

Pos	Player	G	AB	H	Avg.	HR	RBI
C	Bob Tillman	96	307	69	.225	8	32
1B	Dick Stuart	157	612	160	.261	42	118
2B	Chuck Schilling	146	576	135	.234	8	33
3B	Frank Malzone	151	580	169	.291	15	71
SS	Ed Bressoud	140	497	129	.260	20	60
LF	Carl Yastrzemski	151	570	183	.321	14	68
CF	Gary Geiger	121	399	105	.263	16	44
RF	Lou Clinton	148	560	130	.232	22	77

==== Other batters ====
Note: G = Games played; AB = At bats; H = Hits; Avg. = Batting average; HR = Home runs; RBI = Runs batted in

Player	G	AB	H	Avg.	HR	RBI
Roman Mejias	111	357	81	.227	11	39
Russ Nixon	98	287	77	.268	5	30
Felix Mantilla	66	178	56	.315	6	15
Dick Williams	79	136	35	.257	2	12
Billy Gardner	36	84	16	.190	0	1
Jim Gosger	19	16	1	.063	0	0
Rico Petrocelli	1	4	1	.250	0	1

=== Pitching ===
==== Starting pitchers ====
Note: G = Games pitched; IP = Innings pitched; W = Wins; L = Losses; ERA = Earned run average; SO = Strikeouts

Player	G	IP	W	L	ERA	SO
Bill Monbouquette	37	266.2	20	10	3.81	173
Earl Wilson	37	210.2	11	16	3.76	123
Dave Morehead	29	174.2	10	13	3.81	136
Bob Heffner	20	124.2	4	9	4.26	77
Gene Conley	9	40.2	3	4	6.64	14
Ike Delock	6	32.0	1	2	4.50	23
Jerry Stephenson	1	2.1	0	0	7.71	3

==== Other pitchers ====
Note: G = Games pitched; IP = Innings pitched; W = Wins; L = Losses; ERA = Earned run average; SO = Strikeouts

Player	G	IP	W	L	ERA	SO
Wilbur Wood	25	64.2	5	0	3.76	28
Chet Nichols Jr.	21	52.2	3	0	4.78	27
Bob Turley	11	41.1	1	4	6.10	35
Pete Smith	6	15.0	0	0	3.60	6

==== Relief pitchers ====
Note: G = Games pitched; W = Wins; L = Losses; SV = Saves; ERA = Earned run average; SO = Strikeouts

Player	G	W	L	SV	ERA	SO
Dick Radatz	66	15	6	23	1.97	162
Jack Lamabe	65	7	4	6	3.15	93
Arnold Earley	53	3	7	1	4.75	97
Mike Fornieles	9	0	0	0	6.43	5
Hal Kolstad	7	0	2	0	13.09	6

== Awards and honors ==
- Carl Yastrzemski, Gold Glove Award (OF)

All-Star Game

- Bill Monbouquette, reserve P
- Carl Yastrzemski, reserve OF

== Farm system ==
Level	Team	League	Manager
AAA	Seattle Rainiers	Pacific Coast League	Mel Parnell
AA	Reading Red Sox	Eastern League	Eddie Popowski
A	Winston-Salem Red Sox	Carolina League	Matt Sczesny and Bill Slack
A	Waterloo Hawks	Midwest League	Len Okrie
A	Wellsville Red Sox	New York–Penn League	Bill Slack and Matt Sczesny
