= 1962 Boston Red Sox season =

Major League Baseball season

1962 Boston Red Sox
- League: American League
- Ballpark: Fenway Park
- City: Boston, Massachusetts
- Record: 76–84 (.475)
- League place: 8th
- Owners: Tom Yawkey
- President: Tom Yawkey
- General managers: Pinky Higgins
- Managers: Pinky Higgins
- Television: WHDH-TV, Ch. 5
- Radio: WHDH-AM 850 (Curt Gowdy, Ned Martin, Art Gleeson)
- Stats: ESPN.com; Baseball Reference

The 1962 Boston Red Sox season was the 62nd season in the franchise's Major League Baseball history. The Red Sox finished eighth in the American League (AL) with a record of 76 wins and 84 losses, 19 games behind the AL pennant winner and eventual World Series champion New York Yankees.

== Offseason ==
- October 20, 1961: Joe Ginsberg was released by the Red Sox.
- March 24, 1962: Tom Borland was traded by the Red Sox to the Houston Colt .45s for Dave Philley.

== Regular season ==
- Earl Wilson (June 26) Bill Monbouquette (August 1) and each threw no-hitters for the Red Sox. Wilson no-hit the Los Angeles Angels and hit a home run in the process, while Monbouquette threw his against the Chicago White Sox.
- On September 30, Don Gile hit a home run in the last at-bat of his career.
- On October 6, field manager Pinky Higgins, 53, was promoted to executive vice president and general manager. Former Red Sox shortstop/third baseman Johnny Pesky, 43, was promoted from Triple-A Seattle to Boston as Higgins' successor.

=== Season standings ===
American League
Team	W	L	Pct.	GB	Home	Road
New York Yankees	96	66	.593	—	50‍–‍30	46‍–‍36
Minnesota Twins	91	71	.562	5	45‍–‍36	46‍–‍35
Los Angeles Angels	86	76	.531	10	40‍–‍41	46‍–‍35
Detroit Tigers	85	76	.528	10½	49‍–‍33	36‍–‍43
Chicago White Sox	85	77	.525	11	43‍–‍38	42‍–‍39
Cleveland Indians	80	82	.494	16	43‍–‍38	37‍–‍44
Baltimore Orioles	77	85	.475	19	44‍–‍38	33‍–‍47
Boston Red Sox	76	84	.475	19	39‍–‍40	37‍–‍44
Kansas City Athletics	72	90	.444	24	39‍–‍42	33‍–‍48
Washington Senators	60	101	.373	35½	27‍–‍53	33‍–‍48

=== Record vs. opponents ===
1962 American League record Sources:
Team	BAL	BOS	CWS	CLE	DET	KCA	LAA	MIN	NYY	WAS
Baltimore	—	8–10	9–9	11–7	2–16	10–8	8–10	6–12	11–7	12–6
Boston	10–8	—	8–10	7–11	11–6	10–8	6–12	10–8	6–12	8–9
Chicago	9–9	10–8	—	12–6	9–9	9–9	10–8	8–10	8–10	10–8
Cleveland	7–11	11–7	6–12	—	10–8	11–7	9–9	6–12	11–7	9–9
Detroit	16–2	6–11	9–9	8–10	—	12–6	11–7	5–13	7–11	11–7
Kansas City	8–10	8–10	9–9	7–11	6–12	—	6–12	8–10	5–13	15–3
Los Angeles	10–8	12–6	8–10	9–9	7–11	12–6	—	9–9	8–10	11–7
Minnesota	12–6	8–10	10–8	12–6	13–5	10–8	9–9	—	7–11	10–8–1
New York	7–11	12–6	10–8	7–11	11–7	13–5	10–8	11–7	—	15–3
Washington	6–12	9–8	8–10	9–9	7–11	3–15	7–11	8–10–1	3–15	—

=== Opening Day lineup ===
3	Pete Runnels	1B
2	Chuck Schilling	2B
7	Gary Geiger	CF
8	Carl Yastrzemski	LF
11	Frank Malzone	3B
22	Russ Nixon	C
16	Carroll Hardy	RF
1	Ed Bressoud	SS
37	Don Schwall	P

=== Notable transactions ===
- August 14, 1962: Dave Philley was released by the Red Sox.
- September 7, 1962: Galen Cisco was selected off waivers from the Red Sox by the New York Mets.

=== Roster ===
1962 Boston Red Sox
Roster
Pitchers: 15 Galen Cisco; 18 Gene Conley; 14 Ike Delock; 21 Arnold Earley; 20 Mike Fornieles; 28 Hal Kolstad; 47 Billy MacLeod; 27 Bill Monbouquette; 36 Billy Muffett; 31 Chet Nichols Jr.; 15 Merlin Nippert; 17 Dick Radatz; 37 Don Schwall; 49 Pete Smith; 39 Tracy Stallard; 25 Ted Wills; 26 Earl Wilson; 41 Wilbur Wood	Catchers: 22 Russ Nixon; 29 Jim Pagliaroni; 30 Bob Tillman; Infielders: 1 Ed Bressoud; 10 Billy Gardner; 38 Don Gile; 12 Pumpsie Green; 11 Frank Malzone; 3 Pete Runnels; 2 Chuck Schilling	Outfielders: 6 Lou Clinton; 7 Gary Geiger; 16 Carroll Hardy; 19 Dave Philley; 8 Carl Yastrzemski	Manager: 5 Pinky Higgins; Coaches: 35 Billy Herman (Third base); 33 Sal Maglie (Pitching); 32 Len Okrie (Bullpen); 34 Rudy York (First base & Hitting)

== Player stats ==
= Indicates team leader

= Indicates league leader

=== Batting ===
==== Starters by position ====
Note: Pos = Position; G = Games played; AB = At bats; H = Hits; Avg. = Batting average; HR = Home runs; RBI = Runs batted in

Pos	Player	G	AB	H	Avg.	HR	RBI
C	Jim Pagliaroni	90	260	67	.258	11	37
1B	Pete Runnels	152	562	183	.326	10	60
2B	Chuck Schilling	119	413	95	.230	7	35
3B	Frank Malzone	156	619	175	.283	21	95
SS	Ed Bressoud	153	599	166	.277	14	68
LF	Carl Yastrzemski	160	646	191	.296	19	94
CF	Gary Geiger	131	466	116	.249	16	54
RF	Lou Clinton	114	398	117	.294	18	75

==== Other batters ====
Note: G = Games played; AB = At bats; H = Hits; Avg. = Batting average; HR = Home runs; RBI = Runs batted in

Player	G	AB	H	Avg.	HR	RBI
Carroll Hardy	115	362	78	.215	8	36
Bob Tillman	81	249	57	.229	14	38
Billy Gardner	53	199	54	.271	0	12
Russ Nixon	65	151	42	.278	1	19
Pumpsie Green	56	91	21	.231	2	11
Dave Philley	38	42	6	.143	0	4
Don Gile	18	41	2	.049	1	3

=== Pitching ===
==== Starting pitchers ====
Note: G = Games pitched; IP = Innings pitched; W = Wins; L = Losses; ERA = Earned run average; SO = Strikeouts

Player	G	IP	W	L	ERA	SO
Gene Conley	34	241.2	15	14	3.95	134
Bill Monbouquette	35	235.1	15	13	3.33	153
Earl Wilson	31	191.1	12	8	3.91	137
Don Schwall	33	182.1	9	15	4.94	89
Ike Delock	17	86.1	4	5	3.75	49
Wilbur Wood	1	7.2	0	0	3.52	3
Billy Muffett	1	4.0	0	0	9.00	1
Pete Smith	1	3.2	0	1	19.64	1

==== Other pitchers ====
Note: G = Games pitched; IP = Innings pitched; W = Wins; L = Losses; ERA = Earned run average; SO = Strikeouts

Player	G	IP	W	L	ERA	SO
Galen Cisco	23	83.0	4	7	6.72	43

==== Relief pitchers ====
Note: G = Games pitched; W = Wins; L = Losses; SV = Saves; ERA = Earned run average; SO = Strikeouts

Player	G	W	L	SV	ERA	SO
Dick Radatz	62	9	6	24	2.24	144
Mike Fornieles	42	3	6	5	5.36	36
Arnold Earley	38	4	5	5	5.80	59
Hal Kolstad	27	0	2	2	5.43	36
Chet Nichols Jr.	29	1	1	3	3.00	33
Merlin Nippert	4	0	0	0	4.50	3
Billy MacLeod	2	0	1	0	5.40	2
Tracy Stallard	1	0	0	0	0.00	0
Ted Wills	1	0	0	0	inf	0

== Farm system ==
Level	Team	League	Manager
AAA	Seattle Rainiers	Pacific Coast League	Johnny Pesky
A	York White Roses	Eastern League	Mel Parnell
B	Winston-Salem Red Sox	Carolina League	Eddie Popowski and Mace Brown
C	Pocatello Chiefs	Pioneer League	Bill Slack
D	Waterloo Hawks	Midwest League	Matt Sczesny
D	Olean Red Sox	New York–Penn League	Harold Holland
