= 1961 Boston Red Sox season =

Major League Baseball season

1961 Boston Red Sox
- League: American League
- Ballpark: Fenway Park
- City: Boston, Massachusetts
- Record: 76–86 (.469)
- League place: 6th
- Owners: Tom Yawkey
- President: Tom Yawkey
- Managers: Pinky Higgins
- Television: WHDH-TV, Ch. 5
- Radio: WHDH-AM 850 (Curt Gowdy, Ned Martin, Art Gleeson)
- Stats: ESPN.com; Baseball Reference

The 1961 Boston Red Sox season was the 61st season in the franchise's Major League Baseball history. The Red Sox finished sixth in the American League (AL) with a record of 76 wins and 86 losses, 33 games behind the AL and World Series champion New York Yankees.

== Regular season ==
Future Hall of Famer Carl Yastrzemski made his major league debut on Opening Day, April 11. He was considered the heir apparent to Ted Williams, who had retired at the end of 1960.

On June 30, Wilbur Wood made his major league baseball debut with the Red Sox. In a game against the Cleveland Indians, Wood pitched 4 innings, allowed 3 hits, and 2 earned runs. He had 3 strikeouts and allowed 1 walk.

On October 1, in a game against the New York Yankees, Red Sox pitcher Tracy Stallard gave up Roger Maris' 61st home run of the season, breaking Babe Ruth's record for most home runs in a season.

=== Season standings ===
American League
Team	W	L	Pct.	GB	Home	Road
New York Yankees	109	53	.673	—	65‍–‍16	44‍–‍37
Detroit Tigers	101	61	.623	8	50‍–‍31	51‍–‍30
Baltimore Orioles	95	67	.586	14	48‍–‍33	47‍–‍34
Chicago White Sox	86	76	.531	23	53‍–‍28	33‍–‍48
Cleveland Indians	78	83	.484	30½	40‍–‍41	38‍–‍42
Boston Red Sox	76	86	.469	33	50‍–‍31	26‍–‍55
Minnesota Twins	70	90	.438	38	36‍–‍44	34‍–‍46
Los Angeles Angels	70	91	.435	38½	46‍–‍36	24‍–‍55
Kansas City Athletics	61	100	.379	47½	33‍–‍47	28‍–‍53
Washington Senators	61	100	.379	47½	33‍–‍46	28‍–‍54

=== Record vs. opponents ===
1961 American League record Sources:
Team	BAL	BOS	CWS	CLE	DET	KCA	LAA	MIN	NYY	WAS
Baltimore	—	11–7	11–7	9–9	9–9	13–5	8–10	11–7	9–9–1	14–4
Boston	7–11	—	9–9	5–13	8–10	10–8	11–7–1	11–7	5–13	10–8
Chicago	7–11	9–9	—	12–6	6–12	14–4	10–8	9–9–1	6–12	13–5
Cleveland	9–9	13–5	6–12	—	6–12	8–9	10–8	10–8	4–14	12–6
Detroit	9–9	10–8	12–6	12–6	—	12–6–1	14–4	11–7	8–10	13–5
Kansas City	5–13	8–10	4–14	9–8	6–12–1	—	9–9	7–11	4–14	9–9
Los Angeles	10–8	7–11–1	8–10	8–10	4–14	9–9	—	8–9	6–12	10–8
Minnesota	7–11	7–11	9–9–1	8–10	7–11	11–7	9–8	—	4–14	8–9
New York	9–9–1	13–5	12–6	14–4	10–8	14–4	12–6	14–4	—	11–7
Washington	4–14	8–10	5–13	6–12	5–13	9–9	8–10	9–8	7–11	—

=== Notable transactions ===
- May 17, 1961: Joe Ginsberg was signed as a free agent by the Red Sox.
- June 26, 1961: Rip Repulski was released by the Red Sox.

=== Opening Day lineup ===
2	Chuck Schilling	2B
7	Gary Geiger	CF
6	Vic Wertz	1B
4	Jackie Jensen	RF
8	Carl Yastrzemski	LF
3	Pete Runnels	3B
22	Russ Nixon	C
12	Pumpsie Green	SS
27	Bill Monbouquette	P

=== Roster ===
1961 Boston Red Sox
Roster
Pitchers: 21 Tom Borland; 23 Tom Brewer; 15 Galen Cisco; 18 Gene Conley; 14 Ike Delock; 21 Arnold Earley; 20 Mike Fornieles; 17 Dave Hillman; 27 Bill Monbouquette; 36 Billy Muffett; 31 Chet Nichols Jr.; 37 Don Schwall; 39 Tracy Stallard; 25 Ted Wills; 28 Wilbur Wood	Catchers: 24 Joe Ginsberg; 22 Russ Nixon; 29 Jim Pagliaroni; Infielders: 1 Don Buddin; 38 Don Gile; 12 Pumpsie Green; 10 Billy Harrell; 11 Frank Malzone; 3 Pete Runnels; 2 Chuck Schilling; 6 Vic Wertz	Outfielders: 19 Lou Clinton; 7 Gary Geiger; 16 Carroll Hardy; 4 Jackie Jensen; 28 Rip Repulski; 8 Carl Yastrzemski	Manager: 5 Pinky Higgins; Coaches: 35 Billy Herman (Third base); 33 Sal Maglie (Pitching); 32 Len Okrie (Bullpen); 34 Rudy York (First base & Hitting)

== Player stats ==
= Indicates team leader

=== Batting ===
==== Starters by position ====
Note: Pos = Position; G = Games played; AB = At bats; H = Hits; Avg. = Batting average; HR = Home runs; RBI = Runs batted in

Pos	Player	G	AB	H	Avg.	HR	RBI
C	Jim Pagliaroni	120	376	91	.242	16	58
1B	Pete Runnels	143	360	114	.317	3	38
2B	Chuck Schilling	158	646	167	.259	5	62
3B	Frank Malzone	151	590	157	.266	14	87
SS	Don Buddin	115	339	89	.263	6	42
LF	Carl Yastrzemski	148	583	155	.266	11	80
CF	Gary Geiger	140	499	116	.232	18	64
RF	Jackie Jensen	147	498	131	.263	13	66

==== Other batters ====
Note: G = Games played; AB = At bats; H = Hits; Avg. = Batting average; HR = Home runs; RBI = Runs batted in

Player	G	AB	H	Avg.	HR	RBI
Vic Wertz	99	317	83	.262	11	60
Carroll Hardy	85	281	74	.263	3	36
Russ Nixon	87	242	70	.289	1	19
Pumpsie Green	88	219	57	.260	6	27
Lou Clinton	17	51	13	.255	0	3
Billy Harrell	37	37	6	.162	0	1
Rip Repulski	15	25	7	.280	0	1
Joe Ginsberg	19	24	6	.250	0	5
Don Gile	8	18	5	.278	1	1

=== Pitching ===
==== Starting pitchers ====
Note: G = Games pitched; IP = Innings pitched; W = Wins; L = Losses; ERA = Earned run average; SO = Strikeouts

Player	G	IP	W	L	ERA	SO
Bill Monbouquette	32	236.1	14	14	3.39	161
Gene Conley	33	199.2	11	14	4.91	113
Don Schwall	25	178.2	15	7	3.22	91
Ike Delock	28	156.0	6	9	4.90	80

==== Other pitchers ====
Note: G = Games pitched; IP = Innings pitched; W = Wins; L = Losses; ERA = Earned run average; SO = Strikeouts

Player	G	IP	W	L	ERA	SO
Galen Cisco	17	52.1	2	4	6.71	26
Chet Nichols Jr.	26	51.2	3	2	2.09	20
Tom Brewer	10	42.0	3	2	3.43	13
Ted Wills	17	19.2	3	2	5.95	11
Wilbur Wood	6	13.0	0	0	5.54	7
Tom Borland	1	1.0	0	0	18.00	0

==== Relief pitchers ====
Note: G = Games pitched; W = Wins; L = Losses; SV = Saves; ERA = Earned run average; SO = Strikeouts

Player	G	W	L	SV	ERA	SO
Mike Fornieles	57	9	8	15	4.68	70
Tracy Stallard	43	2	7	2	4.88	109
Billy Muffett	38	3	11	2	5.67	47
Arnold Earley	33	2	4	7	3.99	44
Dave Hillman	28	3	2	0	2.77	39

== Farm system ==
Level	Team	League	Manager
AAA	Seattle Rainiers	Pacific Coast League	Johnny Pesky
A	Johnstown Red Sox	Eastern League	Eddie Popowski
B	Winston-Salem Red Sox	Carolina League	Elmer Yoter and Matt Sczesny
D	Waterloo Hawks	Midwest League	Matt Sczesny and Bill Slack
D	Olean Red Sox	New York–Penn League	Harold Holland
D	Alpine Cowboys	Sophomore League	Mel Parnell

LEAGUE CHAMPIONS: Olean
