= Bob Tillman =

American baseball player (1937–2000)

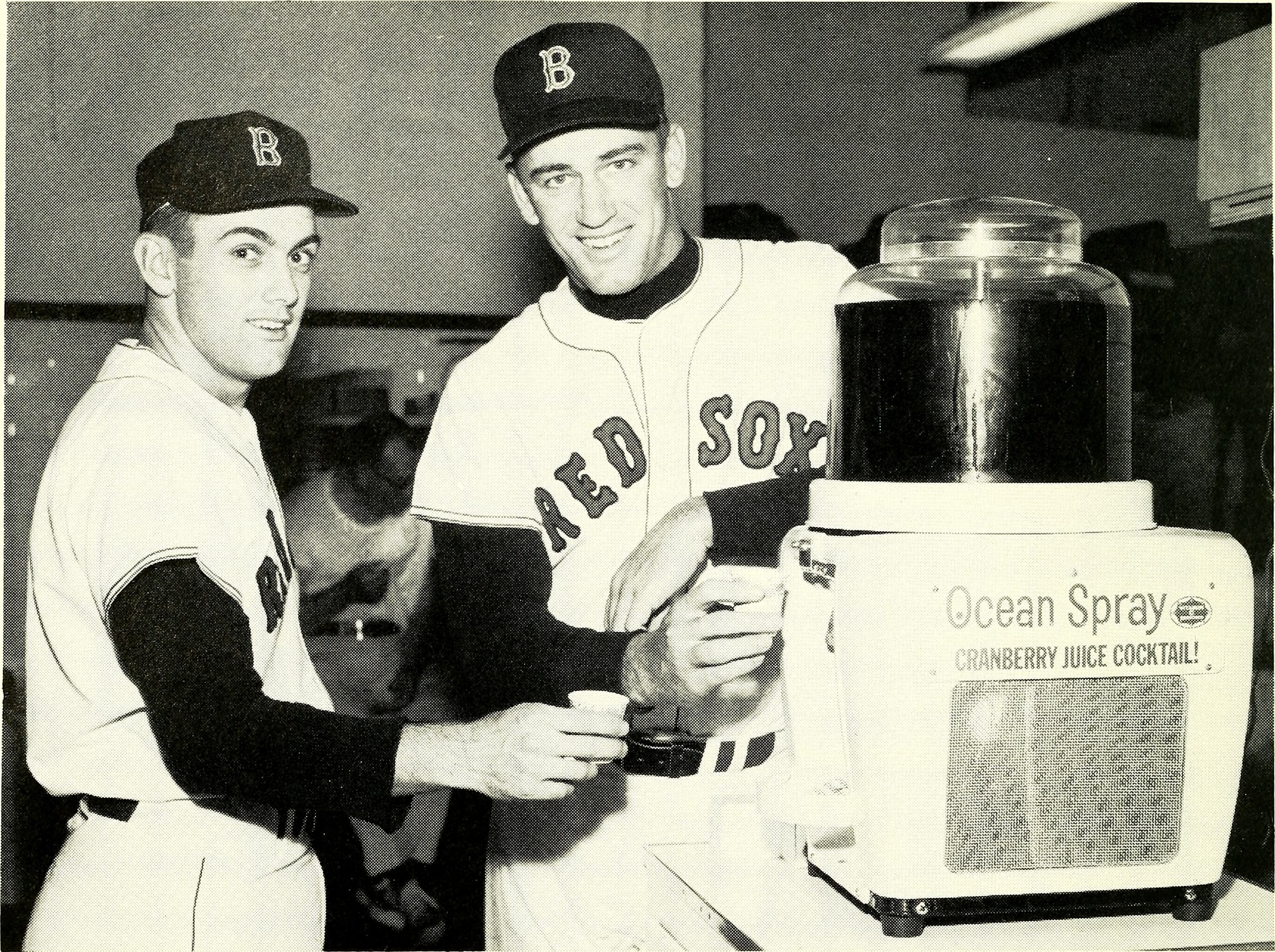
- Tillman, at right, with Chuck Schilling in 1963
- Catcher
- Born: March 24, 1937; Nashville, Tennessee, U.S.
- Died: June 23, 2000 (aged 63); Gallatin, Tennessee, U.S.
- Batted: Right Threw: Right

MLB debut
- April 15, 1962, for the Boston Red Sox

Last MLB appearance
- October 1, 1970, for the Atlanta Braves

MLB statistics
- Batting average: .232
- Home runs: 79
- Runs batted in: 282
- Stats at Baseball Reference

Teams
- Boston Red Sox (1962–1967); New York Yankees (1967); Atlanta Braves (1968–1970)

John Robert Tillman (March 24, 1937 – June 23, 2000) was an American professional baseball player. He played in Major League Baseball as a catcher for the Boston Red Sox (1962–67), New York Yankees (1967), and Atlanta Braves (1968–70). He threw and batted right-handed, stood 6 feet 4 inches (1.93 m) tall and weighed 205 pounds (93 kg). As a Nashville high school athlete in 1955, he was selected as the Most Valuable Player in baseball by the Nashville Interscholastic League, All-State in football at quarterback, and All-District in basketball.

== Early life ==
Tillman was born on March 24, 1937, in Nashville, Tennessee. Tillman graduated from Isaac Litton High School in Nashville, where he starred as a catcher, shortstop and pitcher on the school's baseball team. As a baseball player for Litton, he was the Nashville Interscholastic League's (NIL) Most Valuable Player in 1955. Tillman also led the Litton Lions to an Eastern Division championship, pitching a two-hitter in the championship game. He was named All-Nashville at shortstop.

Tillman also played on Litton's football and basketball teams. In November 1955, he was named the All-State quarterback in football, as well as All-Nashville. He was also All-19th District in basketball in 1955. He was considered one of Nashville's best all-around high school athletes. He was secretary of the Student Christian Association in high school.

He attended Middle Tennessee State University (MTSU) and Georgia Tech (the Georgia Institute of Technology). It has been reported that he originally attended Georgia Tech on a basketball scholarship, and then transferred to MTSU where he played on the football team. It has also been reported that he attended Georgia Tech on a football scholarship, and played quarterback on the freshman team in 1956, before transferring to MTSU where he lettered in both football and baseball. He was a backup quarterback at MTSU.

== Professional career ==
=== Boston Red Sox ===
George Digby, the Boston Red Sox famed baseball scout, signed Tillman for the Red Sox as an amateur free agent in January 1958. The Red Sox paid him a $10,000 signing bonus. After starting his professional baseball career, he served in the United States Army from September 1959 through February 1960, at Fort Jackson.

==== Minor leagues ====
In 1958, he was assigned to the Raleigh Capitals of the Class B Carolina League. He had a .282 batting average with 18 home runs, 76 runs batted in (RBI), and 58 runs scored in 447 at bats; and a .781 OPS (on-base plus slugging). He played 96 games at catcher, where he had a .972 fielding percentage, with 21 fielding errors and 28 passed balls. He also played 15 games as an outfielder.

In 1959, he was promoted to the Single-A Allentown Red Sox of the Eastern League. In only 364 at bats he hit 25 home runs, with 72 RBIs, 55 runs and an .883 OPS. He had a .978 fielding percentage, with 16 errors and 21 passed balls at catcher. He was tied for fourth in home runs in the Eastern League, even though he had 100-200 less at bats than the players equal to or ahead of him in home runs.

In 1960, the Red Sox assigned Tillman to the Triple-A Minneapolis Millers of the American Association. He hit .256 with 24 home runs and 82 RBIs, and a .978 fielding percentage at catcher. Tillman worked out with the Red Sox in spring training before the 1961 season. He was given an opportunity to play first base because the Red Sox liked his power as a right-handed hitter for playing in Fenway Park, and the team had Russ Nixon and Jim Pagliaroni in place as catchers. Before that, Tillman's only experience as a first baseman was playing two games there in high school. Red Sox first baseman Vic Wertz and coach Rudy York (who had played over 1,000 major league games at first base) worked with Tillman on the position. During his subsequent major league career, Tillman never played first base.

In 1961, he did not join the Red Sox, but played his final year of Minor League Baseball (MiLB) with the Triple-A Seattle Rainiers of the Pacific Coast League, under manager Johnny Pesky. He played 29 games at first base and 100 as a catcher. Tillman hit only .215, with 14 home runs and 67 RBIs. However, he had minor league career bests defensively at catcher, with a .985 fielding percentage and only nine errors and 11 passed balls.

==== Red Sox ====
He made the 1962 Red Sox' roster out of spring training as one of Boston's three catchers (with Pagliaroni and Nixon). After drawing walks in his first two MLB plate appearances, Tillman connected for a solo home run against Ted Bowsfield of the Los Angeles Angels in his first official at bat in the majors on May 19 at Fenway Park. In his rookie season, Tillman started 59 games at catcher, chiefly splitting time with Pagliaroni who had 68 starts. Tillman had a .983 fielding percentage. Overall, Tillman played in 81 games, with 14 home runs and 38 RBIs in only 249 at bats, and a .229 batting average. He enjoyed his first year with the Red Sox, but he called all of his later seasons in Boston "pure drudgery".

In 1963, Tillman started 89 games at catcher for the Red Sox. He had a .992 fielding percentage (fourth best in the American League), but led all American League catchers in allowing 43 stolen bases. He hit .225, with eight home runs, 32 RBIs and a .653 OPS.

His finest offensive season came in 1964, under his former Seattle manager Johnny Pesky. Tillman set personal bests in almost every offensive category, hitting .278 with 17 home runs, 18 doubles, 43 runs scored, 61 RBIs, 49 bases on balls and a .796 OPS, in 131 games played and 425 at bats. Defensively, he had a .989 fielding percentage, but allowed the most stolen bases of any catcher in the Major Leagues (61).

In 1965, he played in 20 fewer games, and hit only .215, with six home runs and 35 RBIs, under new manager Billy Herman. Tillman led the American League for the third consecutive year in allowing the most stolen bases (50). In 1966, Herman made Mike Ryan the starting catcher. Tillman hit .230, with three home runs and 24 RBIs in 204 at bats.

Dick Williams became the Red Sox manager in 1967, and played Ryan and Russ Gibson ahead of Tillman at catcher. Tillman spent the first four months of the Red Sox' pennant-winning 1967 season on the Boston roster, getting into 30 games, before his contract rights were sold to the New York Yankees on August 8. Under American League rules, Tillman was not allowed to receive any share of the 1967 World Series money, which upset his former teammates, particularly future Hall of Fame outfielder Carl Yastrzemski, who felt Tillman had suffered with the team through bad years and deserved some reward.

Tillman caught two no-hitters during his Red Sox days: Earl Wilson's in 1962, and Dave Morehead's in 1965.

=== New York Yankees and Atlanta Braves ===
Tillman played in 21 games for the Yankees, starting 15 at catcher. He hit .254 with two home runs and nine RBIs in 63 at bats. After the 1967 season the Yankees traded Tillman and Dale Roberts to the Atlanta Braves for third baseman Bobby Cox.

In 1968, Tillman was the backup catcher to Joe Torre. Over his playing career, Torre was a nine-time All-Star and the National League's Most Valuable Player in 1971, and a future Hall of Fame manager. During the Braves' 1968 spring training, Tillman had to compete with a number of catchers for the backup position (Johnny Blanchard, Bob Uecker and Marty Martinez). Torre developed a sore throwing arm in spring training, giving Tillman an opportunity for more playing time. Tillman did very well in spring training, impressing manager Luman Harris, who called Tillman "'the surprise of spring training'". Tillman's hitting was better than Harris expected, and Tillman proved himself a capable catcher defensively, especially in handling the difficult knuckleball thrown by future Hall of Fame pitcher Phil Niekro. Harris made him Torre's backup.

Torre's finger was injured on a foul tip during the Braves home opener on April 12, 1968. Tillman entered the game and hit a game-winning two run home run. Torre returned to play after a few days, but on April 18 he was hit in the face by a Chuck Hartenstein pitch, suffering fractures in his cheekbone and palate. He did not return to play until May 19. On the season, Torre started 85 games catching and 28 at first base. Tillman started 66 games catching. Tillman hit .220, with five home runs and 20 RBIs in 236 at bats.

Before the start of the 1969 season, the Braves traded Torre to the St. Louis Cardinals for future Hall of Fame first baseman Orlando Cepeda. Tillman temporarily retired in training camp, before rejoining the team. Rookie Bob Didier became the starting catcher in Torre's place, with Tillman the backup catcher.

Tillman helped the 1969 Braves win the National League West Division title, appearing in 69 games, 52 as starting catcher. His batting average was only .195, but he had 12 home runs and 29 RBIs in 190 at bats. Tillman hit three home runs against Grant Jackson in a July 30 game against the Philadelphia Phillies.

In 1969, Didier had a .256 batting average in 352 at bats, playing in 114 games for the Braves. In 1970, he started 48 games at catcher, but hit .149 in 57 total games for the Braves, and was sent down to the Triple-A Richmond Braves on July 12, with a .157 batting average; though recalled for some late season games. The majority of catching duties were split between Tillman (63 starts at catcher) and Hal King (51 starts). Tillman hit .238, with 11 home runs and 30 RBIs in 223 at bats.

On December 2, 1970, the Braves traded Tillman to the Milwaukee Brewers for Hank Allen, Paul Click and minor-league infielder John Ryan at the Winter Meetings. The Brewers released Tillman in February 1971, ending his Major League career.

In nine seasons he played in 775 games and had 2,329 at-bats, 189 runs, 540 hits, 68 doubles, 10 triples, 79 home runs, 282 RBIs, one stolen base, 228 walks, a .232 batting average, a .300 on-base percentage, a .371 slugging percentage, 865 total bases, 9 sacrifice hits, 14 sacrifice flies, and 33 intentional walks.

== Personal life and death ==
Tillman met his wife Dolores while playing in Boston. They married in 1963 and made their home in Nashville. After retiring, he worked for a food company in Gallatin, Tennessee, 25 miles from Nashville.

In April 1984, at age 47, Tillman underwent heart surgery in Nashville's Baptist Hospital after suffering a heart attack.

He died of a heart attack at his home on June 23, 2000, in Gallatin, Tennessee, at the age of 63. A moment of silence was observed in his honor at an Atlanta Braves game.

== See also ==
- List of Major League Baseball players with a home run in their first major league at bat
