= Billy MacLeod =

American baseball player (1942–2018)

- Pitcher
- Born: May 13, 1942; Gloucester, Massachusetts, U.S.
- Died: December 12, 2018 (aged 76); Marblehead, Massachusetts, U.S.
- Batted: Left Threw: Left

MLB debut
- September 13, 1962, for the Boston Red Sox

Last MLB appearance
- September 22, 1962, for the Boston Red Sox

MLB statistics
- Win–loss record: 0–1
- Earned run average: 5.40
- Strikeouts: 2
- Stats at Baseball Reference

Teams
- Boston Red Sox (1962)

William Daniel MacLeod (May 13, 1942 – December 12, 2018) was an American relief pitcher in Major League Baseball who played briefly for the Boston Red Sox during the 1962 season. The Gloucester, Massachusetts, native threw and batted left-handed and was listed as 6 feet 2 inches (1.88 m) tall and 190 pounds (86 kg).

In 1960, MacLeod posted a 9–0 won–lost record during his senior season at Gloucester High School. After signing with the Red Sox, he marked his 1961 professional baseball debut by winning 15 of 23 decisions at Winston-Salem of the Class B Carolina League. His 15 victories tied him with three other pitchers for the most in the league, while his sparkling 2.31 earned run average and 208 strikeouts led the circuit. He was named an All-Star and the Carolina League Rookie of the Year.

Promoted all the way to the Triple-A Pacific Coast League in 1962, he had a winning record (8–6) for the Seattle Rainiers, although his ERA climbed to 4.64. When rosters expanded late that season, he was recalled by the Red Sox for his first (and, ultimately, his only) MLB opportunity, appearing in relief in two road games.

On September 13, against Detroit at Tiger Stadium, he relieved the starting pitcher, fellow rookie Pete Smith, in the fourth inning with Boston already trailing 8–0. MacLeod retired the only man he faced, veteran centerfielder Bill Bruton, on a ground ball to shortstop, then exited the game for a pinch hitter. Nine days later, he was called into an extra-inning game against the Washington Senators at DC Stadium with the score tied 3–3 in the 11th frame. He held Washington scoreless in the 11th, fanning Jim King and Bob Johnson. But, in the 12th, after getting one out, he allowed two singles and a "walk-off" double, struck by left-handed hitter Bud Zipfel, and was charged with the 4–3 defeat, his only big-league decision.

In his two relief appearances, MacLeod posted a 0–1 record with two strikeouts, one walk, four hits allowed, and a 5.40 ERA in 12/3 innings pitched.

MacLeod resumed his career in the minors in 1963. Although he struggled that season, he returned to form in 1964 in the Double-A Eastern League, with a 12–6 mark for Reading. Then, in 1965, hurling for Pittsfield, he compiled a perfect 18–0 record, accompanied by a 2.73 ERA and 15 complete games, helping lead Pittsfield to the Eastern League championship. Counting his final four decisions of the 1964 season, he won 22 consecutive games.

He retired after the 1967 season with a minor-league won–lost mark of 62–39. He became a longtime resident of Marblehead, Massachusetts, and died at his home on December 12, 2018, at age 76.

== See also ==
- 1962 Boston Red Sox season
