= Merlin Nippert =

American baseball player (born 1938)

- Pitcher
- Born: September 1, 1938 (age 87); Mangum, Oklahoma, U.S.
- Batted: Right Threw: Right

MLB debut
- September 12, 1962, for the Boston Red Sox

Last MLB appearance
- Sweptember 22, 1962, for the Boston Red Sox

MLB statistics
- Win–loss record: 0–0
- Earned run average: 4.50
- Strikeouts: 3
- Stats at Baseball Reference

Teams
- Boston Red Sox (1962)

Merlin Lee Nippert (born September 1, 1938) is an American former professional baseball player. A relief pitcher, he appeared briefly in Major League Baseball for the Boston Red Sox during the final weeks of the 1962 season. The native of Mangum, Oklahoma, was listed as 6 feet 1 inch (1.85 m) tall and 175 pounds (79 kg) and batted and threw right-handed.

Nippert attended the University of Central Oklahoma and Oklahoma State University and signed with the Red Sox in 1957. By 1962, he had risen to the Triple-A Seattle Rainiers of the Pacific Coast League, where he excelled coming out of the bullpen: he won eight of 12 decisions and posted a 2.00 earned run average in 58 games pitched, all in relief. Seattle fans nicknamed him "Merlin the Magician".

The parent Red Sox recalled him in September for four relief appearances. Nippert allowed three earned runs and four hits, giving up four walks and striking out three in six full innings pitched for a 4.50 ERA. He did not have a decision or a save. He stayed on Boston's 40-man roster for spring training in 1963, but returned to Seattle for two more campaigns before retiring from the game.

== See also ==
- 1962 Boston Red Sox season
