= Carroll Hardy =

American baseball player (1933–2020)

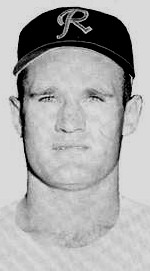
- Outfielder
- Born: May 18, 1933; Sturgis, South Dakota, U.S.
- Died: August 9, 2020 (aged 87); Highlands Ranch, Colorado, U.S.
- Batted: Right Threw: Right

MLB debut
- April 15, 1958, for the Cleveland Indians

Last MLB appearance
- September 27, 1967, for the Minnesota Twins

MLB statistics
- Batting average: .225
- Home runs: 17
- Runs batted in: 113
- Stats at Baseball Reference

Teams
- Cleveland Indians (1958–1960); Boston Red Sox (1960–1962); Houston Colt .45's (1963–1964); Minnesota Twins (1967)
Football career
No. 27
Position	Halfback
Personal information
Listed height	6 ft 0 in (1.83 m)
Listed weight	185 lb (84 kg)
Career information
High school	Sturgis (SD) Brown
College	Colorado
NFL draft	1955: 3rd round, 34th overall pick
Career history
San Francisco 49ers (1955)
Awards and highlights
Third-team All-American (1954); First-team All-Big Seven (1954); Hula Bowl MVP (1955)
Stats at Pro Football Reference

Carroll William Hardy (May 18, 1933 – August 9, 2020) was an American professional athlete who played in the National Football League (NFL) for the San Francisco 49ers (1955) and in Major League Baseball for the Cleveland Indians (1958–1960), Boston Red Sox (1960–1962), Houston Colt .45s (1963–1964) and Minnesota Twins (1967). Born in Sturgis, South Dakota, he batted and threw right-handed and was listed as 6 feet (1.8 m) tall and 185 pounds (84 kg).

== Amateur career ==
Hardy attended the University of Colorado from 1951 to 1955, where he lettered in football, baseball and track. He was all-Big Seven Conference as a halfback, running from a single-wing formation under head coach Dallas Ward, and All-Conference in baseball under head coach Frank Prentup.

== Professional football ==
A third-round pick in the 1955 NFL draft, Hardy chose baseball over football after one year in the National Football League (NFL). He caught 12 passes—four for touchdowns— while he played halfback with the San Francisco 49ers in 1955. Though he was named the Hula Bowl MVP that year, he became more notable as a baseball player.

As a 49er, he shared the field with Pro Football Hall of Famers Y. A. Tittle, Joe Perry and Hugh McElhenny.

== Major League Baseball ==
Though the New York Times on August 12,2020 reported that Hardy had the honor of being the only player ever to have pinch-hit for Ted Williams, that is not correct. Tom Wright pinch hit for Williams on June 17, 1951 in the second game of a doubleheader vs the St Louis Browns, according to retrosheet. Few know that his pinch-hit résumé goes well beyond the mistaken claim to immortality: he also pinch hit for Carl Yastrzemski, Williams's replacement in left field, and also pinch-hit for Roger Maris.

=== Indians ===
Hardy spent two seasons, 1957–58, with the Indians' farm team, the San Diego Padres, owned at the time by C. Arnholt Smith, founder and owner of San Diego's U.S. National Bank. A reserve for the majority of his career, he debuted with the Cleveland Indians in the 1958 season. On May 18, celebrating his 25th birthday, he pinch-hit for Roger Maris and belted his first major league home run, a three-run blast off Billy Pierce, to lead Cleveland to a 7–4 victory over the Chicago White Sox.

=== Red Sox ===
Hardy was on the bench for the Boston Red Sox on September 20, 1960. Ted Williams, in the final days of his Hall of Fame career, fouled a ball off his foot in the first inning of a game on September 20. After he limped off the field, Hardy finished the at bat for him, becoming the only player ever to pinch hit for Williams. Hardy lined into a double play.

On September 28 at Fenway Park, in his final major league appearance, Williams hit his 521st and last home run off Jack Fisher of the Baltimore Orioles. In the ninth inning, he was replaced by Hardy in left field. "They booed me all the way out and cheered him all the way in", Hardy later remembered. Then, on May 31, 1961, Hardy pinch-hit for rookie Carl Yastrzemski, making him the only player in major league history to go in for both future Hall of Famers.

Hardy saw the most action in 1962, posting career highs in games (115), at-bats (362), hits (78), runs, home runs (eight) and runs batted in (36), but hit for just a .215 average. On April 11, Hardy enjoyed another career highlight at Fenway Park when he broke up a scoreless pitching duel between Cleveland's Ron Taylor and Boston's Bill Monbouquette, hitting a 12th-inning walk-off grand slam for a 4–0 Red Sox victory over the Indians.

=== Remaining career ===
On December 10, 1962, Hardy was traded to the Houston Colt .45s for another outfielder, Dick Williams, who eventually became Boston's manager, leading them to the 1967 American League pennant, and enjoyed a long Hall of Fame career as a manager.

Hardy spent most of the remainder of his playing career at the Triple-A level, with brief appearances for Houston and Minnesota. On the last day of the 1967 season, the Twins lost a chance to clinch the American League pennant to the Red Sox, losing 6–2, at Fenway Park. With two outs in the ninth inning, Rich Rollins pinch hit for catcher Russ Nixon, popping out to Rico Petrocelli for the last out of the game. Had Rollins reached base, Hardy likely would have pinch hit for Twins pitcher Mudcat Grant.

Hardy managed in the Twins' farm system at the Class A level in 1968.

In an eight-season career, Hardy was a .225 hitter with 17 home runs and 113 RBI in 433 games.

== After baseball ==
With his baseball career behind him, Hardy worked for 20 years in the Denver Broncos' front office. As a player personnel director, he was the key figure in building the Orange Crush Defense in the 1970s. Hardy was also with the Broncos when they went to Super Bowl XII in 1977. He also worked for the city of Steamboat Springs, Colorado.

Hardy died as a result of complications of dementia in 2020 at the age of 87.

== See also ==
- List of NCAA major college yearly punt and kickoff return leaders
