= Dick Radatz =

American baseball player (1937–2005)

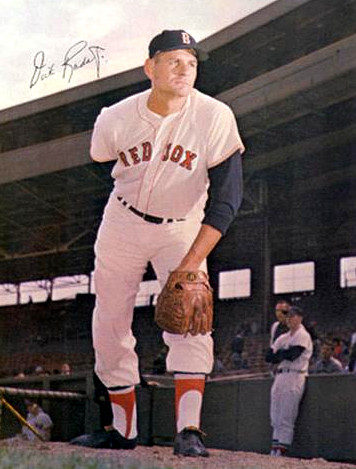
- Pitcher
- Born: April 2, 1937; Detroit, Michigan, U.S.
- Died: March 16, 2005 (aged 67); Easton, Massachusetts, U.S.
- Batted: Right Threw: Right

MLB debut
- April 10, 1962, for the Boston Red Sox

Last MLB appearance
- August 15, 1969, for the Montreal Expos

MLB statistics
- Win–loss record: 52–43
- Earned run average: 3.13
- Strikeouts: 745
- Saves: 120
- Stats at Baseball Reference

Teams
- Boston Red Sox (1962–1966); Cleveland Indians (1966–1967); Chicago Cubs (1967); Detroit Tigers (1969); Montreal Expos (1969)

Career highlights and awards
- 2× All-Star (1963, 1964); 2× AL saves leader (1962, 1964); Boston Red Sox Hall of Fame

Richard Raymond Radatz (April 2, 1937 – March 16, 2005) was an American relief pitcher in Major League Baseball. Nicknamed "The Monster", the 6 ft 6 in (1.98 m), 230 lb (100 kg) right-hander had a scorching but short-lived period of dominance for the Boston Red Sox in the early 1960s. Radatz is reported to have gotten his nickname during a game against the New York Yankees in Boston in 1963 in which he came in to pitch with the bases loaded and no one out. He consecutively struck out Mickey Mantle, Roger Maris, and Elston Howard, after which Mantle grumbled about Radatz being "that monster". Over his career, Radatz struck out Hall of Famer Mantle 44 times in 63 at-bats.

As of 2025, Radatz owns the record for the most strikeouts in a single season by a reliever in MLB history, striking out 181 batters in 1964. This broke his own record, set in 1963 when he struck out 162. The only pitcher since to even surpass his 1963 total is Mark Eichhorn, with 166 strikeouts in 1986.

== Early life ==
Born in Detroit, Radatz was the first child of Virginia (Osterman) and Norman Radatz, an automotive engineer and body design draftsman. Radatz grew up in Berkley, Michigan, in the same neighborhood that produced Hall of Fame Detroit Tigers pitcher Hal Newhouser. Norman Radatz had known Newhouser when Newhouser was young, and Dick Radatz grew up admiring Newhouser. Radatz attended Berkley High School, where he played football, baseball, and basketball. He threw a no-hitter in April 1954, only allowing one base on balls; one of three no-hitters he pitched in high school.

He also played Class D baseball for Walway, in the Detroit Baseball Federation. He had a 7–1 won–loss record, the team winning the American Baseball Congress junior title in August of 1954.

He was a star basketball and baseball player at Michigan State University before signing with the Red Sox as an amateur free agent in 1959. Another future MLB relief pitcher, Ron Perranoski, was Radatz's roommate at Michigan State. In 1957, Radatz and Perranoski played for the Watertown Lake Sox of the Basin League in South Dakota, with whom he had a 10-1 record. Radatz returned in 1958 and led the Basin League with 107 strikeouts. As a Michigan State senior, he was 10–1 with a 1.12 earned run average (ERA).

== Minor leagues ==
Originally a starting pitcher when he began his professional career, Radatz compiled a 16–10 record and 3.48 ERA in his first two seasons in the Red Sox farm system. At Triple-A with the Seattle Rainiers in 1961, Radatz was converted into a reliever by manager Johnny Pesky against his will, due to a sore arm. The experiment worked, as he pitched in 54 games in relief, with a 2.28 ERA, 24 saves and 74 strikeouts in 71 innings. Radatz earned a job with the Red Sox out of spring training the following season as a non-roster invitee.

== Boston Red Sox ==
Radatz was immediately dominant at the major league level, as he pitched 18.1 innings and recorded six saves before surrendering his first earned run on May 15, 1962, against the Yankees (a game which the Red Sox won, and Radatz earned his seventh save). On July 12, 1962, he pitched five innings in relief to gain a win over the Kansas City Athletics, and the next day pitched seven innings in relief for another win against the A's. In a September 1962 game against the Yankees, he pitched nine innings in relief, winning the game. In a 1963 game, he pitched six relief innings to defeat the Baltimore Orioles, allowing only two hits. He went on to lead the American League in saves (24), games (62) and relief wins (9), while posting a 2.24 ERA in 124.2 innings his rookie season, earning the AL's Fireman of the Year from The Sporting News. He was tied for ninth among all AL players with a 5.2 WAR (wins above replacement). Radatz was tied for third in AL Rookie of the Year voting. Boston's baseball writers named him the Red Sox Rookie of the Year.

Yankee manager Ralph Houk, who said "[f]or two seasons, I've never seen a better pitcher," added Radatz to his 1963 AL All-Star team after a 33 scoreless inning streak saw his ERA dip to 0.88 on June 14. He gave up one earned run in two innings pitched, but impressed with strikeouts of Willie Mays, Dick Groat, Duke Snider, Willie McCovey and Julián Javier. For the season, he saved 23 games and went 15–6 with a 1.97 ERA, along with the stretch of 33 scoreless innings pitched; becoming the first pitcher in history to have consecutive 20-save seasons and finishing fifth in AL MVP voting despite Boston's seventh-place finish. He was fifth among all AL players with a 5.5 WAR.

The Red Sox toyed with the idea of converting Radatz back into a starter for the 1964 season. Instead, he remained in the bullpen, and earned his second Fireman of the Year award in 1964 for his major league-leading 29 saves with 16 wins and a 2.29 ERA in 79 games (breaking Jim Konstanty's record of 74). He was again in the top 10 AL players with a 6.0 WAR. He fanned 181 batters in 157 innings, setting a record that still stands for most strikeouts by a relief pitcher in a single season. During his three peak seasons in Boston (1962-64), Radatz averaged 10.59 strikeouts per nine innings.

He was named to the AL's All-Star Game pitching staff again in 1964, and struck out the first two batters he faced when he entered the game in the eighth inning. He was, however, unable to hold onto the AL's 4–3 lead, as he surrendered four runs in the ninth, including a game ending three-run home run by Johnny Callison.

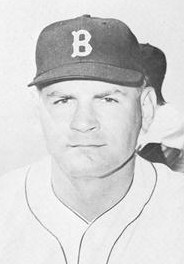
Radatz, circa 1965

Radatz got off to a poor start to the 1965 season, blowing three save opportunities and posting a 7.54 ERA through May 14. He settled down, bringing his ERA down to a far more respectable 3.91 and earning 22 saves by season's end, but his 9–11 mark was the first losing record he had posted in his major league career.

Radatz believed his decline as a pitcher was the result of trying to develop a new pitch during spring training in 1965. He worked on adding a sinker to go along with his overpowering fast ball. In the process, he changed his pitching motion and lost velocity on his fastball, taking away what had been the pitch that made him extraordinary.

Radatz's only career home run came off the Kansas City Athletics' Jesse Hickman on June 5, 1965.

Radatz was mentioned in trade rumors with the Los Angeles Dodgers, Milwaukee Braves and Minnesota Twins during the off-season, but eventually returned to the Red Sox. He was 0–2 with a 4.74 ERA before being dealt to the Cleveland Indians on June 2 for Don McMahon and Lee Stange.

== Cleveland Indians ==
Radatz went 0–3 with a 4.61 ERA in Cleveland. He earned a combined 14 saves between his two teams in 1966, marking the first time in his career he failed to reach 20. He also failed to win a game as he ended the season with an 0–5 record.

== Chicago Cubs ==
Nine games into the 1967 season, Radatz was dealt to the Chicago Cubs for a player to be named later. On June 9, Radatz pitched a scoreless ninth inning against the New York Mets at Wrigley Field to earn his first win since September 14, 1965. But in 21.2 innings pitched with the Cubs through July 7, Radatz surrendered 12 hits, 23 walks and hit five batters. He was sent down to the minors to work on his control, but was unable to regain it. In 34 innings pitched in the minors, Radatz surrendered 25 hits and 40 walks and hit eight batters.

== Detroit Tigers ==
The Cubs released Radatz during spring training of 1968. He signed with his hometown Detroit Tigers shortly afterwards, and spent the 1968 season with their Triple A affiliate Toledo Mud Hens. With Toledo, Radatz was 6–7, 2.78 ERA, 24 GP, started 13 games, 5 CG, 3 SHO, 110.O IP, 103 K, 23 BB, and a WHIP of 0.973. He earned a spot on the major league roster out of spring training 1969, and was 2–2 with a 3.32 ERA in 11 appearances when his contract was sold to the Montreal Expos at the June 15 trade deadline. He went 0–4 with a 5.71 ERA for the Expos before he was released in August.

== Legacy ==
Radatz pitched at a time when starting pitchers were more likely to finish games and it was common for a closer to pitch more than one inning. These factors reduced the likelihood of getting a save. Out of his 104 saves, Radatz pitched two or more innings 53 times, including three or more innings for 20 of those saves. As a Red Sox reliever, he had a 10–0 record in games where he pitched five or more innings, and was 16–2 in games where he pitched four or more innings. Overall with Boston, Radatz saved 104 games (a team record later broken by Bob Stanley) with a 49–34 record and 646 strikeouts in 576.1 innings pitched. With the other four teams, he went only 6–20 with 26 saves in 117.2 innings.

He was selected to the Boston Red Sox Hall of Fame in 1997.

Through 2024, he remains fourth in saves among all Red Sox pitchers, only behind Stanley, Jonathan Papelbon, and Craig Kimbrel.

== Personal life and death ==
After leaving the game, Radatz worked at a number of jobs, had his own weekly radio show, and was a frequent guest on other sports talk radio shows. Radatz frequently suggested that contemporary relievers weren't durable enough and that his own experience was that when he didn't get used as much, he lost his edge.

In the 1970s, Radatz suffered from severely painful cluster headaches, after the deaths of his mother and a close friend. A resident of Farmington Hills, Michigan, Radatz moved back to the Greater Boston area in 1984, living in Easton, Massachusetts, where former teammate Jerry Moses had found him a job at a corrugated packaging company, Triple P Packaging. "I felt I had formed a love affair with this town, that I was appreciated by the fans here." Before his death in 2005, Radatz worked as pitching coach for the North Shore Spirit, an independent league team based in Lynn, Massachusetts. The team was managed by former Red Sox infielder John Kennedy, who was expecting Radatz to return for the 2005 season.

Radatz died on March 16, 2005, after falling down a flight of stairs at his home in Easton, Massachusetts. He left behind a wife and three children. The Red Sox held a moment of silence during their 2005 home opener in his honor.

His son Richard Jr. was an executive in the Red Sox minor league system. He was later an assistant director of the Michigan Special Olympics and a creator of the Northwoods League.

== See also ==
- List of Major League Baseball annual saves leaders

Preceded by Luis Arroyo; Stu Miller	American League Saves Leader; 1962; 1964	Succeeded by Stu Miller; Ron Kline
Preceded by Carl Yastrzemski	Boston Red Sox MVP; 1964	Succeeded by Carl Yastrzemski
