= Bob Heffner =

American baseball player (1938–2025)

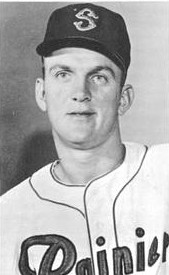
- Heffner in 1961
- Pitcher
- Born: September 13, 1938; Allentown, Pennsylvania, U.S.
- Died: June 25, 2025 (aged 86); Allentown, Pennsylvania, U.S.
- Batted: Right Threw: Right

MLB debut
- June 19, 1963, for the Boston Red Sox

Last MLB appearance
- May 20, 1968, for the California Angels

MLB statistics
- Win–loss record: 11–21
- Earned run average: 4.51
- Strikeouts: 241
- Stats at Baseball Reference

Teams
- Boston Red Sox (1963–1965); Cleveland Indians (1966); California Angels (1968)

Robert Frederic Heffner (September 13, 1938 – June 25, 2025), nicknamed "Butch", was an American Major League Baseball right-handed pitcher with the Boston Red Sox (1963–1965), Cleveland Indians (1966), and California Angels (1968).

== Early life and education ==
Heffner was born in Allentown, Pennsylvania, on September 13, 1938. He attended Allentown High School, now William Allen High School, where he was an All-State basketball player in 1956 and 1957.

== Major League Baseball ==
On June 12, 1957, Heffner was signed by the Boston Red Sox as an amateur free agent right out of high school.

Throughout his Major League Baseball (MLB) career, Heffner was used both as starter and reliever. His most productive season came in 1964 with the Red Sox, when he posted career-highs in wins (seven, including a shutout), strikeouts (112), saves (six), games (55), and innings (158 2/3).

Heffner's five-season MLB career totals include an 11–21 W–L record, a 4.51 ERA, and six saves. Overall, he appeared in 114 games, 31 of which were as a starter.

== Death ==
Heffner died on June 25, 2025, in Allentown, Pennsylvania, at the age of 86.
