= Chuck Schilling =

American baseball player (1937–2021)

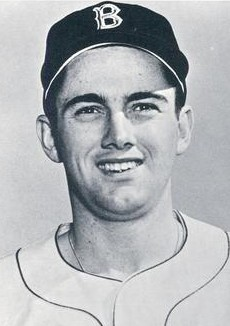
- Second baseman
- Born: October 25, 1937; Brooklyn, New York, U.S.
- Died: March 30, 2021 (aged 83); West Chester, Pennsylvania, U.S.
- Batted: Right Threw: Right

MLB debut
- April 11, 1961, for the Boston Red Sox

Last MLB appearance
- October 3, 1965, for the Boston Red Sox

MLB statistics
- Batting average: .239
- Home runs: 23
- Runs batted in: 146
- Stats at Baseball Reference

Teams
- Boston Red Sox (1961–1965)

Charles Thomas Schilling (October 25, 1937 – March 30, 2021) was an American professional baseball player who appeared in Major League Baseball as a second baseman for the Boston Red Sox from 1961 to 1965. A graduate of St. Mary's High School in Manhasset, New York (1955) and Manhattan College (1959), he threw and batted right-handed, stood 5 feet 11 inches (1.80 m) tall and weighed 170 pounds (77 kg).

After playing for Boston's Triple-A Minneapolis Millers farm team in 1960, Schilling broke into the Major Leagues in 1961, the same year as his friend and fellow Long Islander, eventual Hall of Famer Carl Yastrzemski. A slick fielder, his arrival prompted the Red Sox to move the incumbent American League batting champion, Pete Runnels, from second base to first baseman and utility infielder. Schilling appeared in 158 games as a rookie, setting career highs in batting average (.259), hits (167), runs scored (87) and runs batted in (RBI) (62). He committed eight errors in 846 chances for a league-best fielding percentage of .991. He won the Red Sox' Most Valuable Player (now the Thomas A. Yawkey) Award for 1961 as bestowed by the Boston chapter of the Baseball Writers' Association of America.

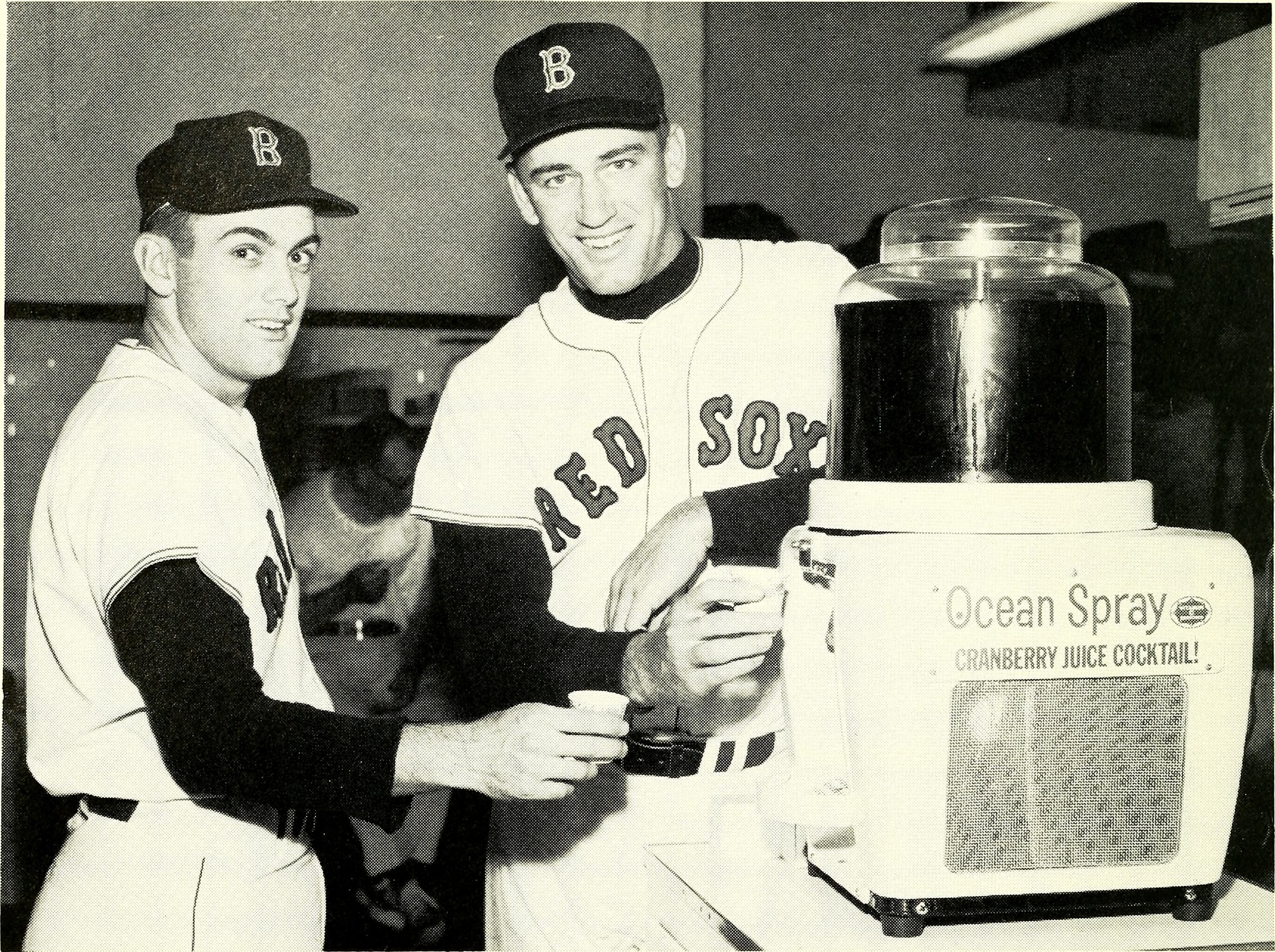
Schilling, at left, with Bob Tillman in 1963

In 1962, Schilling's sophomore season, he suffered a broken hand, causing him to miss over 40 games and impairing his batting ability for the rest of his career. Although he hit a personal-best seven home runs in 1962, he batted only .230 and would never again hit over .240. He was still the Red Sox' regular second baseman in 1963, but hit .234 in 143 games and lost his regular job to Felix Mantilla and Dalton Jones in 1964, both good hitters but mediocre-at-best fielders.

By the start of the 1966 campaign, Schilling had become a utility player. During spring training, he was traded to the Minnesota Twins with catcher Russ Nixon for left-handed pitcher Dick Stigman. Schilling began the season on the Twins' 28-man roster, but never played a game for manager Sam Mele and retired just before the rosters were cut to 25 on May 15 rather than accept a minor league assignment.

During his five-season career, Schilling batted .239 in 541 games played, with 470 hits, 76 doubles, five triples, 23 home runs and 146 runs batted in.

In retirement, he returned to Long Island to teach secondary-school mathematics and play competitive softball until he was 69.

He died on March 30, 2021, at the age of 83.
