= Hal Kolstad =

American baseball player (born 1935)

- Pitcher
- Born: June 1, 1935 (age 89); Rice Lake, Wisconsin
- Batted: Right Threw: Right

MLB debut
- April 22, 1962, for the Boston Red Sox

Last MLB appearance
- July 17, 1963, for the Boston Red Sox

MLB statistics
- Win–loss record: 0–4
- Earned run average: 6.59
- Strikeouts: 42
- Stats at Baseball Reference

Teams
- Boston Red Sox (1962–1963)

Harold Everette Kolstad (born June 1, 1935) is a former pitcher in Major League Baseball who played from 1962 through 1963 for the Boston Red Sox. Listed at 5 ft 9 in (1.75 m) and 190 pounds (86 kg), Kolstad batted and threw right-handed. He was signed by Boston as a free agent in 1957 out of the San Jose State University.

In a two-season MLB career, Kolstad posted a 0–4 win–loss mark with 42 strikeouts and a 6.59 ERA in 34 appearances, including two starts, two saves and 72⅓ innings pitched. He surrendered 81 hits and 41 bases on balls.

In 1966, Kolstad joined the faculty at Leigh High School in San Jose, California as a teacher and coach. He remained there until his retirement in 1990.
