= Pete Smith (baseball, born 1940) =

American baseball player

- Pitcher
- Born: March 19, 1940 (age 86); Natick, Massachusetts, U.S.
- Batted: Right Threw: Right

MLB debut
- September 13, 1962, for the Boston Red Sox

Last MLB appearance
- September 28, 1963, for the Boston Red Sox

MLB statistics
- Win–loss record: 0–1
- Earned run average: 6.75
- Innings: 18 2/3
- Stats at Baseball Reference

Teams
- Boston Red Sox (1962–1963)

Peter Luke Smith (born March 19, 1940) is an American former pitcher in Major League Baseball who played from 1962 to 1963 for the Boston Red Sox. Listed at 6' 2", 190 lb., Smith batted and threw right-handed.

A native of Natick, Massachusetts, he idolized Bobby Doerr as a child and graduated from Natick High School in 1957 before attending Colgate University.

At Colgate, Smith played baseball and soccer and ran cross country. He set an NCAA record by striking out 23 batters in a game against Bucknell.

In a two-season career, Smith posted a 0–1 record with a 6.75 ERA in seven appearances, including two starts, giving up 14 runs on 18 hits and eight walks while striking out seven in 18 2/3 innings of work.

On September 28, 1963, at Fenway Park, Smith started a triple play against the Angels with the last ball he fielded in the majors. With Charlie Dees running on second base and Lee Thomas on first, Félix Torres tried to advance both runners with a bunt. Unfortunately for Torres, Smith fielded cleanly the ball and threw to 3B Frank Malzone, who tagged Dees out before throwing the ball to SS Eddie Bressoud, covering second to double out Thomas. Bressoud then threw to 2B Félix Mantilla, who covered first and completed the 1-5-6-4 triple play.

After the end of his baseball career, he served as a school guidance counselor mostly in Westchester County, New York.
