= Arnold Earley =

American baseball player (1933–1999)

- Earley with the Houston Astros, circa 1967
- Pitcher
- Born: June 4, 1933; Lincoln Park, Michigan, U.S.
- Died: September 29, 1999 (aged 66); Flint, Michigan, U.S.
- Batted: Left Threw: Left

MLB debut
- September 27, 1960, for the Boston Red Sox

Last MLB appearance
- July 25, 1967, for the Houston Astros

MLB statistics
- Win–loss record: 12–20
- Earned run average: 4.48
- Strikeouts: 310
- Stats at Baseball Reference

Teams
- Boston Red Sox (1960–1965); Chicago Cubs (1966); Houston Astros (1967)

Arnold Carl Earley (June 4, 1933 – September 29, 1999) was an American professional baseball player and left-handed pitcher in Major League Baseball. He was born in Lincoln Park, Michigan, where he attended Lincoln Park High School.

== Career ==
Earley was listed as 6 feet 1 inch (1.85 m) tall and 195 pounds (88 kg). He appeared in eight seasons in the major leagues with the Boston Red Sox (1960–65), Chicago Cubs (1966) and Houston Astros (1967). Signed by the Red Sox as an amateur free agent in 1952, he did not make his major league debut until 1960 at age 27. He missed the 1954 and 1955 seasons while serving in the United States Army.

He appeared in 223 major league games (all but ten as a relief pitcher) and had a lifetime record of 12–20 with 310 strikeouts, 85 games finished and 14 saves. As a starting pitcher, he threw one complete game: on July 15, 1964, he defeated the contending Chicago White Sox, 11–2, at Fenway Park, allowing only four hits. In 3811/3 career innings pitched, Earley surrendered 400 hits and 188 bases on balls. His lifetime earned run average was 4.48 for an Adjusted ERA+ of 87. His best season was 1964 when he played in 25 games for the Red Sox and had an earned run average of 2.68 and an Adjusted ERA+ of 143.

== Death ==
Arnold Earley died at age 66 in Flint, Michigan, in 1999.
