= Frank Malzone =

American baseball player (1930–2015)

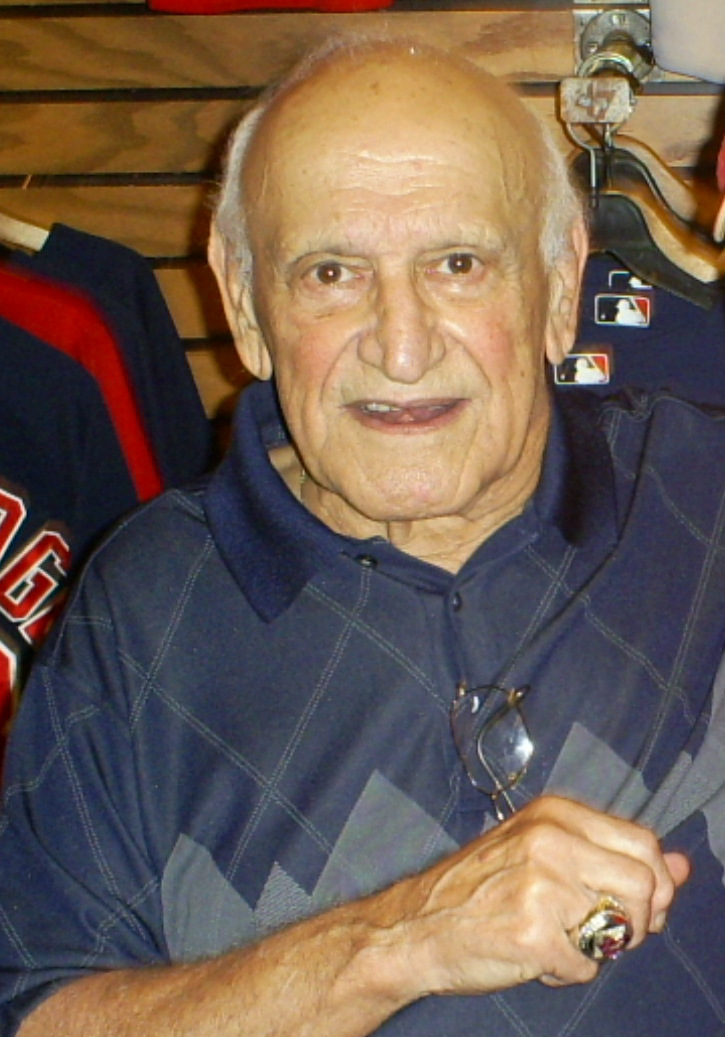
- Third baseman
- Born: February 28, 1930; Bronx, New York, U.S.
- Died: December 29, 2015 (aged 85); Needham, Massachusetts, U.S.
- Batted: Right Threw: Right

MLB debut
- September 17, 1955, for the Boston Red Sox

Last MLB appearance
- October 1, 1966, for the California Angels

MLB statistics
- Batting average: .274
- Home runs: 133
- Runs batted in: 728
- Stats at Baseball Reference

Teams
- Boston Red Sox (1955–1965); California Angels (1966)

Career highlights and awards
- 8× All-Star (1957–1960², 1963, 1964); 3× Gold Glove Award (1957–1959); Boston Red Sox Hall of Fame

Frank James Malzone (February 28, 1930 – December 29, 2015) was an American Major League Baseball third baseman who played for the Boston Red Sox (1955–65) and California Angels (1966).

== Early life ==
Malzone was born on February 28, 1930, in the Bronx, New York. He was the son of an Italian immigrant, Francis Malzone, and Pauline (Dazago) Malzone. Malzone attended Samuel Gompers High School, where he played baseball. He was signed as a free agent by the Boston Red Sox in 1948, his senior year. Malzone was the first Gompers graduate to reach the major leagues. He had also tried out for the New York Giants in 1948, but was told he was too light and small.

== Career ==
Malzone spent 11 seasons with Boston and is among the all-time Red Sox leaders in several categories. He batted .276 with 131 home runs and 716 runs batted in (RBI) in 1,359 games. He finished up with the Angels, playing 82 games in 1966.

=== Minor league and military career ===
In 1948, shortly after turning 18, the Red Sox assigned Malzone to the Milford Red Sox. The team was located in Milford, Delaware, part of the Eastern Shore League. He had a .304 batting average that year. In 1949, he was assigned to the Oneonta Red Sox of the Canadian-American League, where he hit .329, with 107 runs scored and 92 runs batted in, with 26 doubles and 26 triples. He suffered broken leg early in 1950 season, and played in only two games.

In 1951, he played for the Scranton Red Sox in the Eastern League, but served in the U.S. Army in 1952 and 1953. He played for the Louisville Colonels of the American Association in 1954 and 1955, hitting .270 and .310 respectively.

In early 1956, Malzone's two-year-old daughter died.

=== Major league career ===
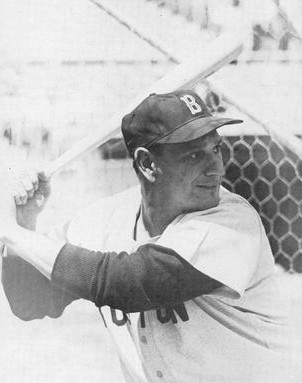
Malzone in 1965

Malzone made his Boston debut in September 1955, playing in six games for the Red Sox that year. On September 20, 1955, he went 6-for-10 in a doubleheader against Baltimore. In 1956, he started out with the Red Sox and played in 27 games, but was hitting poorly. He was sent to the San Francisco Seals of the Pacific Coast League, playing in 87 games. Some in the organization thought the death of his 15-month old daughter Suzanne weighed heavily on Malzone.

In 1957, in his first full season with the Red Sox, he became the starting third baseman, and hit .292 and had a career-high 103 RBIs. He tied an American League record for a third baseman with 10 assists in a game. He became the first player to lead the league at his position in games played, putouts, errors, assists, double plays and fielding percentage. He received the inaugural Gold Glove Award at third base, which was given to only one player in both leagues for each position in 1957. Casey Stengel also chose him as a reserve for the 1957 American League All-Star Team. Stengel promised to play Malzone in the game, who he said had "come along great". Malzone came into the game for George Kell, with no hits in two at bats.

In 1958, Malzone led the league with 627 at-bats, games played (playing in every Red Sox game), and hit a career-high .295. Malzone had been third in the league in games played in 1957 (153), would be second in 1959 (154), and fifth in 1960 (152). The American League regular season went from 154 games to 162 games in 1961 (followed by the National League in 1962). Malzone played in over 150 games seven years in a row (1957-1963), and had a streak of playing in 475 consecutive games.

Through 1961, he tied an American League record by leading all third basemen in double plays for five seasons (with Ken Keltner), and was the first to do so in five consecutive seasons, both of which still stand as of 2024. As of 2024, Malzone was 34th all time in double plays made by third basemen, even though only playing 12 years. Malzone enjoyed his best season in 1962, batting .283 with 21 home runs and 95 RBIs. When Red Sox legend Carl Yastrzemski joined the team in 1961, Malzone took Yastrzemski under his wing.

He was an All-Star at third base eight times (1957, 1958, twice in 1959, twice in 1960, 1963, and 1964). From 1959 to 1962, there were two All-Star Games annually, the second game to raise money for the players' pension fund. In 1959's second All-Star Game, Malzone hit a home run against future Hall of Fame pitcher Don Drysdale. Malzone won three straight Gold Glove Awards; in 1957 for both leagues, and in 1958-1959 for the American League. He was the last American League third baseman to win a Gold Glove prior to Brooks Robinson's 16-year run at third base.

The Red Sox released Malzone after the 1965 season, but informed him he would have a place with the team once he retired. In 1966, Malzone's final season as a player, he played 82 games with the California Angels, batting only .206.

In his playing career, Malzone compiled a total record of a .274 lifetime batting average, 133 home runs, 728 RBIs, 647 runs, 239 doubles, 21 triples, and 14 stolen bases in 1,441 games.

=== Scouting and consulting ===
After leaving the Angels, Malzone became a scout for the Red Sox in New England. He was an advance scout, following other teams the Red Sox played in the 1967 pennant race and World Series and providing reports on these opponents. In total, he was an advance scout for 28 years. He also did instructional work with Red Sox players, such as Rico Petrocelli and Jim Rice. He remained on the Red Sox payroll as a "player development consultant" for many years after his retirement from scouting.

== Honors ==
Malzone was inducted into the Boston Red Sox Hall of Fame in its inaugural Class of 1995.

== Death ==
He died on December 29, 2015.

== See also ==
- List of Gold Glove Award winners at third base
