= Ike Delock =

American baseball player (1929–2022)

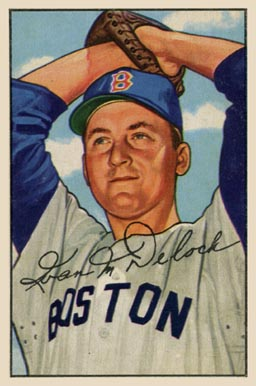
- Pitcher
- Born: November 11, 1929; Highland Park, Michigan, U.S.
- Died: February 28, 2022 (aged 92); Raleigh, North Carolina, U.S.
- Batted: Right Threw: Right

MLB debut
- April 17, 1952, for the Boston Red Sox

Last MLB appearance
- July 13, 1963, for the Baltimore Orioles

MLB statistics
- Win–loss record: 84–75
- Earned run average: 4.03
- Strikeouts: 672
- Stats at Baseball Reference

Teams
- Boston Red Sox (1952–1953, 1955–1963); Baltimore Orioles (1963)

Ivan Martin Delock (November 11, 1929 – February 28, 2022) was an American Major League Baseball right-handed pitcher who played 11 seasons for the Boston Red Sox (1952–1953, 1955–1963) and Baltimore Orioles (1963).

== Early years ==
Delock was born in 1929 at Highland Park, Michigan, to Croatian immigrants. He was a multisport athlete at Highland Park High School, playing third base for the baseball team, guard for the basketball team, and fullback for the football team. After high school, he served in the Marine Corps from 1946 to 1948.

== Professional baseball ==
After his discharge from the Marines, Delock signed with the Boston Red Sox. He spent four years in Boston's minor league system, playing for the Auburn Cayugas (1948), Oneonta Red Sox (1949), Roanoke Red Sox (1950), and Scranton Red Sox (1951). In 1950, he compiled a 15–8 record, a 2.87 ERA, and a career-high 147 strikeouts with Roanoke. In 1951, he had the best year of his career with Scranton in 1951, tallying a 20–4 record, 1.92 ERA, 136 strikeouts, and 20 complete games.

Delock played eleven seasons with the Red Sox from 1952 to 1953 and 1955 to 1963. He compiled a record of 83–72. He pitched in at least 20 games for the Red Sox every year from 1952 to 1961 (1954 excepted), and had an Adjusted ERA+ of 110 or better in 1955 (114), 1956 (110), 1958 (118), 1959 (138), and 1961 (110).

Delock led the American League with 11 relief wins in 1956 while tying for fourth with nine saves (then not an official statistic). In 1958, he was among the league leaders in win percentage and had a 13-game win streak that was broken at the end of July. His best major-league season was 1959 when he went 11–6 with a 2.95 ERA—1.10 points lower than the league average. His Adjusted ERA+ in 1959 was 138, and his winning percentage of .647 was fifth best in the American League.

In 1962, a knee injury shortened Delock's career. He began the 1963 season with Boston, appearing in only six games before being released on June 1. He signed with Baltimore on June 8, 1963, appeared in seven games, including his final game on July 13.

== Later years ==
After his baseball playing career, Delock was affiliated with the National Sports Camp in Windham, Connecticut, and was a sales representative for Northwest Airlines. He died in 2022 at Raleigh, North Carolina, at age 92.
