= Russ Nixon =

American baseball player and manager (1935–2016)

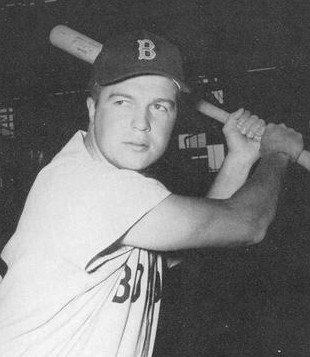
- Catcher / Manager
- Born: February 19, 1935; Cleves, Ohio, U.S.
- Died: November 8, 2016 (aged 81); Las Vegas, Nevada, U.S.
- Batted: Left Threw: Right

MLB debut
- April 20, 1957, for the Cleveland Indians

Last MLB appearance
- September 16, 1968, for the Boston Red Sox

MLB statistics
- Batting average: .268
- Home runs: 27
- Runs batted in: 266
- Managerial record: 231–347
- Winning percentage: .400
- Stats at Baseball Reference
- Managerial record at Baseball Reference

Teams
- As player: Cleveland Indians (1957–1960); Boston Red Sox (1960–1965); Minnesota Twins (1966–1967); Boston Red Sox (1968); As manager: Cincinnati Reds (1982–1983); Atlanta Braves (1988–1990); As coach: Cincinnati Reds (1976–1982); Montreal Expos (1984–1985); Atlanta Braves (1986–1987); Seattle Mariners (1992)

Career highlights and awards
- World Series champion (1976)

Russell Eugene Nixon (February 19, 1935 – November 8, 2016) was an American professional baseball player, coach, and manager. He played as a catcher in Major League Baseball (MLB) from 1957 to 1968. A veteran of 55 years in professional baseball, Nixon managed at virtually every level of the sport, from the lowest minor league to MLB assignments with the Cincinnati Reds and Atlanta Braves. He batted left-handed and threw right-handed, and stood 6 feet 1 inch (1.85 m) tall and weighed 190 pounds (86 kg) in his playing days.

== American League catcher ==
Nixon was born in Cleves, Ohio, near Cincinnati. He graduated from Western Hills High School in Cincinnati, and also attended the University of Cincinnati. At Game One of the 1952 World Series, he was given the honor of throwing out the ceremonial first pitch.

Nixon and his twin brother, Roy, an infielder, each signed with the Cleveland Indians in 1953. Although Roy never played Major League Baseball, retiring after five minor league seasons, Russ Nixon fashioned a 12-year MLB career with the Indians (1957–60), Boston Red Sox (1960–65; 1968) and Minnesota Twins (1966–67). In his best season, 1958, Nixon caught 101 games for Cleveland and batted .301.

Overall, he appeared in 906 games through all or parts of 12 seasons, and batted .268. His 670 hits included 115 doubles, 19 triples and 27 home runs. He holds the record for most games played without ever stealing a base.

In addition, Nixon was actually traded twice to the Red Sox in 1960. Cleveland initially dealt him to Boston on March 16 for catcher Sammy White and first baseman Jim Marshall. White chose to retire and the trade was cancelled but not before Nixon played five exhibition games for the Red Sox. Nixon returned to the Indians and started the regular season with them, appearing in 25 games, 21 as the starting catcher; then, almost three months after the original swap, on June 13, he was traded to the Red Sox a second time, with outfielder Carroll Hardy for Canadian-born pitcher Ted Bowsfield and outfielder Marty Keough.

Nixon remained with the Red Sox' organization through 1965 as a platoon catcher, although he spent part of 1965 with Triple-A Toronto. At the close of spring training in 1966, Boston packaged him and second baseman Chuck Schilling in a trade with the Minnesota Twins for left-handed pitcher Dick Stigman. Nixon spent two years as the Twins' second-string catcher, then was released in April 1968 and returned to the Red Sox' organization. Beginning the year at Double-A Pittsfield, he was recalled in July and in his first at bat, he hit a three-run, pinch-hit double, providing the winning margin in a 6–5 victory over the Twins.

But Nixon hit only .153 in his final Boston tour and was outrighted to their Triple-A Louisville affiliate. The Chicago White Sox then selected him in the Rule 5 draft that December. Nixon went to spring training in 1969 with the White Sox, but was given his unconditional release a week before the regular season began.

Nixon reached base 863 times in his career without ever stealing a base, a Major League record.

== National League coach and manager ==
His managing career began in the Cincinnati Reds' farm system in 1970 and in 1976 he was promoted to a coaching position with the defending World Series champion Reds, under Baseball Hall of Fame manager Sparky Anderson. In Nixon's first season, Cincinnati's "Big Red Machine" dynasty reached its pinnacle with a second consecutive world championship, dispatching the New York Yankees in a four-game sweep in the 1976 World Series. However, the Reds' period in the sun began to dim with the advent of baseball free agency. Anderson was fired after the 1978 season, and Nixon remained on the Reds' staff under their new manager, John McNamara, in 1979.

After compiling the best overall record in baseball during the strike-affected split season of 1981, the Reds unraveled in 1982, plummeting into last place and losing 101 games. McNamara was fired July 21 and Nixon took his place. Nixon was unable to right the ship, as the Reds went 27–43 the rest of way en route to what is still the only 100-loss season in franchise history. When the Reds finished last again in 1983, Nixon was fired. He then coached for the Montreal Expos (1984–85) before signing as a coach with the Braves. Nixon worked for Chuck Tanner in 1986–87 before his appointment as pilot of the Greenville Braves, the club's Double-A Southern League affiliate, for 1988.

While new general manager Bobby Cox had done much to rebuild the Braves' farm system, at the National League level they were in the midst of their worst stretch since their days in Boston. When the Braves dropped 27 of their first 39 games in 1988, Nixon was recalled from Greenville to succeed Tanner on May 23—a rare promotion of a manager from AA all the way to the majors. However, the losses continued to pile up. The 1988 Braves finished 54–106, the worst season in the Atlanta portion of Braves history and the franchise's worst since its struggles in Boston during the Great Depression. Nixon was unable to turn the Braves' fortunes around in 1989 and through the first 65 games of 1990, seasons in which the Braves lost 97 games each while seeing young pitchers such as Tom Glavine, John Smoltz, and Steve Avery make the roster. On June 22, 1990, Cox fired Nixon and took over as field manager himself.

Between 1981 and 1986, Nixon managed in the Mexican Pacific League for the Venados de Mazatlán, Potros de Tijuana and Naranjeros de Hermosillo.

== Later career ==
Nixon remained in the game as a minor-league manager and instructor, except for 1992, when he returned to the American League to spend one year as a coach for the Seattle Mariners. At age 70, he spent the 2005 season as manager of the Greeneville Astros, rookie-level Appalachian League affiliate of the Houston Astros, and in 2006–07 he was a roving instructor in the Houston farm system. In 2008, Nixon, then 73, was still active in baseball as a roving instructor in the Texas Rangers' farm system, appointed by the club president at the time, Nolan Ryan.

== Death ==
Russ Nixon died on November 8, 2016, in Las Vegas, Nevada, at the age of 81.
