= Bill Monbouquette =

American baseball player (1936–2015)

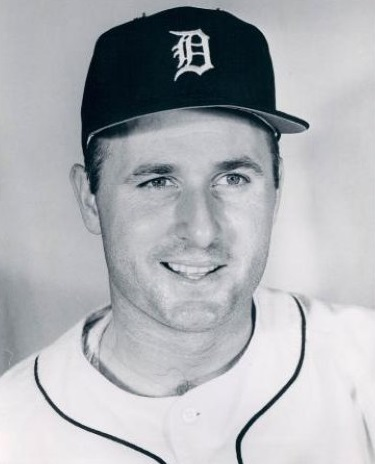
- Monbouquette in 1967
- Pitcher
- Born: August 11, 1936; Medford, Massachusetts, U.S.
- Died: January 25, 2015 (aged 78); Boston, Massachusetts, U.S.
- Batted: Right Threw: Right

MLB debut
- July 18, 1958, for the Boston Red Sox

Last MLB appearance
- September 3, 1968, for the San Francisco Giants

MLB statistics
- Win–loss record: 114–112
- Earned run average: 3.68
- Strikeouts: 1,122
- Stats at Baseball Reference

Teams
- Boston Red Sox (1958–1965); Detroit Tigers (1966–1967); New York Yankees (1967–1968); San Francisco Giants (1968)

Career highlights and awards
- 4× All-Star (1960, 1960^{2}, 1962, 1963); Pitched a no-hitter on August 1, 1962; Boston Red Sox Hall of Fame

William Charles Monbouquette (August 11, 1936 – January 25, 2015) was an American professional baseball player and coach. He played in Major League Baseball (MLB) as a right-handed pitcher for the Boston Red Sox (1958–65), Detroit Tigers (1966–67), New York Yankees (1967–68), and the San Francisco Giants (1968). A four-time All-Star player, Monbouquette was notable for pitching a no-hitter in 1962 as a member of the Red Sox. He was inducted into the Boston Red Sox Hall of Fame in 2000.

== Early career ==
Bill was born in Medford, Massachusetts, and attended Medford High School. He was signed as a free agent on June 21, 1955, by the Boston Red Sox at the age of 18.

== Major League career ==
Monbouquette compiled 114 wins, 1,122 strikeouts, and a 3.68 earned run average during his major league career. He was also an above-average fielding pitcher, recording a .984 fielding percentage with only seven errors in 428 total chances in 1961 1/3 innings of work.

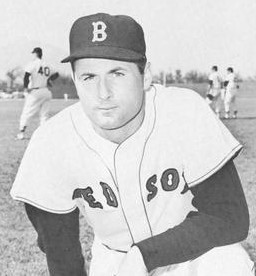
Monbouquette as a member of the Boston Red Sox in 1965.

Monbouquette was signed by the Boston Red Sox as an amateur free agent in 1955 and started his majors career on July 18, 1958. He won at least 14 games from 1960 to 1963, with a career-high 20 victories in 1963. An American League (AL) All-Star in 1960, 1962, and 1963, Monbouquette no-hit the Chicago White Sox 1–0 on August 1, 1962, at Comiskey Park; a second-inning walk to Al Smith was the only baserunner Monbouquette allowed. Monbouquette credited Red Sox pitching coach Sal Maglie with refining his delivery, enabling him to improve his pitching performance.

He also collected two one-hit games, and set a Red Sox record with a 17 strikeout-game against the Washington Senators in 1961. The record stood until Roger Clemens established a major league record with 20 strikeouts in a 1986 game against Seattle.

On September 25, 1965, in a game against the Kansas City A's, Monbouquette was the starting pitcher versus 58-year-old Hall of Famer Satchel Paige. Monbouquette threw a complete game for his tenth win of the season, but became the final strikeout victim of Paige's career in the 3rd inning.

After going 96–91 with Boston, Monbouquette was sent to the Detroit Tigers before the 1966 season. He also pitched for the New York Yankees and finished his career with the San Francisco Giants on September 3, 1968. He never made the postseason.

Monbouquette spent five years coaching in the New York Mets farm system before being named the pitching coach of the Mets in November 1981, joining new manager George Bamberger. In October 1982, the Mets relieved Monbouquette of his duties and announced that Bamberger, the manager, would handle both roles. Although Bamberger denied that there had been any conflict between the two, Monbouquette told The New York Times, "You can't have two pitching coaches on the same club. Two opinions could be conflicting. Maybe it was confusing at times."

Monbouquette was inducted into the Boston Red Sox Hall of Fame in 2000. He was a pitching coach for Detroit Single-A affiliate team, Oneonta Tigers. Bill was also once professional hockey player Wayne Muloin's brother-in-law. When people would ask him for an autograph, he surprised people because although he pitched and batted right-handed, his hand writing was left handed.

== Illness and death ==
In May 2008, the Boston Globe reported that Monbouquette was suffering from acute myelogenous leukemia. The chemotherapy and drug treatment he received had the disease in remission, but he needed a bone marrow and stem cell transplant to be cured. The Red Sox, in conjunction with Dana–Farber Cancer Institute, on June 7, 2008, encouraged fans to enroll in the National Marrow Donor Registry at Tufts University in hopes of finding a suitable donor for Monbouquette and others suffering from the disease.

In 2010, the Boston rock band the Remains released a song, "Monbo Time", as a tribute to Monbouquette. The Remains pledged to donate 50% of the revenues they receive from sales of the song to cancer research.

Monbouquette died on January 25, 2015, aged 78 at Brigham and Women's Hospital in Boston, Massachusetts. He was buried in Oak Grove Cemetery, Medford, Massachusetts.

== See also ==
- List of Major League Baseball no-hitters
- List of Major League Baseball career wins leaders

Preceded by Sandy Koufax	No-hitter pitcher August 1, 1962	Succeeded by Jack Kralick
Preceded by Rube Walker	New York Mets Pitching Coach; 1982–1983	Succeeded by Mel Stottlemyre
