= Carl Yastrzemski =

American baseball player (born 1939)

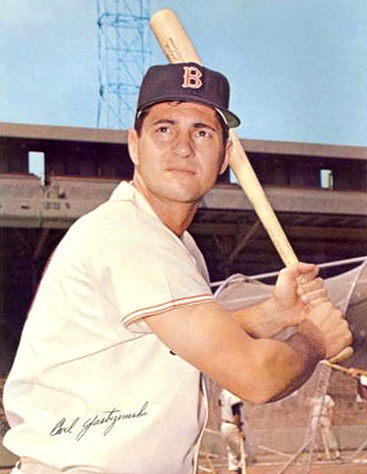
- Yastrzemski with the Boston Red Sox in 1966
- Left fielder / First baseman
- Born: August 22, 1939 (age 87); Southampton, New York, U.S.
- Batted: Left Threw: Right

MLB debut
- April 11, 1961, for the Boston Red Sox

Last MLB appearance
- October 2, 1983, for the Boston Red Sox

MLB statistics
- Batting average: .285
- Hits: 3,419
- Home runs: 452
- Runs batted in: 1,844
- Stats at Baseball Reference

Teams
- Boston Red Sox (1961–1983)

Career highlights and awards
- 18× All-Star (1963, 1965–1979, 1982, 1983); AL MVP (1967); AL Triple Crown (1967); 7× Gold Glove Award (1963, 1965, 1967–1969, 1971, 1977); 3× AL batting champion (1963, 1967, 1968); AL home run leader (1967); AL RBI leader (1967); Boston Red Sox No. 8 retired; Boston Red Sox Hall of Fame

Member of the National

Baseball Hall of Fame
- Induction: 1989
- Vote: 94.6% (first ballot)

Carl Michael Yastrzemski Sr. (/jəˈstrɛmski/ yə-STREM-skee; born August 22, 1939), nicknamed "Yaz", is an American former professional baseball player who played his entire 23-year career with the Boston Red Sox of Major League Baseball (MLB). He started his career primarily as a left fielder, but also played 33 games as a third baseman. Later in his career, he was mainly a first baseman and designated hitter.

Yastrzemski is an 18-time All-Star, the possessor of seven Gold Gloves, a member of the 3,000 hit club, and the first American League (AL) player in that club to also accumulate over 400 home runs. He is second on the all-time list for games played, and third for total at-bats. He is the Red Sox's all-time leader in career RBIs, runs, hits, singles, doubles, total bases, and games played, and is third on the team list for home runs, behind Ted Williams and David Ortiz. He was elected to the Baseball Hall of Fame in 1989 in his first year of eligibility.

In 1967 Yastrzemski achieved a peak in his career, leading the Red Sox to the American League pennant for the first time in over two decades and being voted the 1967 American League MVP. Yastrzemski also won the Triple Crown that year, something not accomplished again in the Major Leagues until Miguel Cabrera did so in 2012.

== Early life ==
Yastrzemski was born in Southampton, New York, to Karol Yastrzemski (anglicized to Carl) and Hattie Skonieczny. Both his parents were of a Polish background, and young Carl was bilingual from an early age. Raised on his father's potato farm, Carl played on sandlot baseball teams with his father, who, he maintains, was a better athlete than he was. Yastrzemski also played Little League Baseball, and became the first Little League player to be inducted into the Baseball Hall of Fame. He graduated in 1957 from Bridgehampton School. During his time there he was a successful three sport athlete participating in football, basketball and baseball. Yastrzemski was a career .512 hitter, he also threw a no-hitter with 18 strikeouts in the 1957 Suffolk Championship baseball game in 1957. He also set the Suffolk County record for most points in a varsity basketball season the same year. During his senior basketball season he set the Bridgehampton scoring record previously held by Jim Brown. He attended Notre Dame on a basketball scholarship briefly before embarking on his baseball career.

Yastrzemski, who had studied business at Notre Dame, fulfilled a promise to his parents by finishing his degree at Merrimack College in North Andover, Massachusetts, in 1966.

== Major League career ==
=== Early career and rise to prominence (1959–1966) ===
Yastrzemski signed with the Red Sox organization, which sent him to the minor-league Raleigh Capitals in 1959, where he led the league with a .377 batting average, winning both the Carolina League Most Valuable Player Award, and Rookie of the year. The organization moved him to the Minneapolis Millers for that post-season, Yastrzemski 7-for-18 as he and Millers beat the Fort Worth Cats four games to three to win the American Association championship. They then played the Havana Sugar Kings for the International League championship but were defeated in seven games. Yastrzemski then went on to play the entire 1960 season with the Millers.

Yastrzemski began his Major League Baseball career in 1961. He hit his first home run off former Boston Red Sox pitcher Jerry Casale. Upon assuming the left-field position previously held by Ted Williams, he faced significant public and media attention. During his rookie year, he batted .266 with 11 home runs and 80 RBIs. Yastrzemski later commented on his rookie season, stating, "I started off very slow. I actually think that was on account of Ted. I was trying to emulate him—be a home run hitter and not be myself: just an all-around player. I could never be a Ted Williams as far as hitting was concerned." Williams later watched Yastrzemski during batting practice that season and told him he had “a great swing and to just go out and use it." Yastrzemski's play improved in 1962, when he posted a .296 batting average with 19 home runs, 43 doubles, and 94 RBIs.

While his first two years were viewed as solid but unspectacular, he emerged as a rising star in 1963, winning the American League batting championship with a .321 average. He also led the league in doubles (40) and walks (95) and finished sixth in Most Valuable Player voting. Additionally, Yastrzemski was selected to his first All-Star Game and won his first Gold Glove Award. His numbers declined slightly during the 1964 season; he recorded a .289 batting average, hit 15 home runs, and drove in 67 RBIs. He also hit a career-high nine triples that year.

During the 1965 season, Yastrzemski hit for the cycle on May 14 in a 12–8 Red Sox loss to the Detroit Tigers at Fenway Park. He went 5-for-5 with two home runs and one walk, becoming the 13th player in Red Sox history to hit for the cycle while also tying a team record with 14 total bases. This performance raised Yastrzemski's batting average to .304. However, two days later, during the second game of a doubleheader against the Tigers, he was injured while attempting to break up a double play when Jake Wood struck him in the back with his knee, leaving Yastrzemski with a cracked rib and a bruised kidney. The injury forced him to miss several games, and when he returned his average had fallen below .300. He quickly rebounded with a strong stretch from June 9 to June 28, batting .425 during that span. Not long after raising his average again, Yastrzemski suffered another setback when he pulled a leg muscle, causing him to miss 13 games and preventing him from appearing in the All-Star Game. Once back in the lineup, he resumed hitting well, carrying a .332 average as late as August 27. He ultimately finished the season batting .312 while also leading the league in on-base percentage (.395), slugging percentage (.536), and OPS (.932). However, Minnesota's Tony Oliva passed him late in the season, leaving Yastrzemski in second place for the league's batting title. At the end of the year, he was selected for his second Gold Glove Award. Yastrzemski also led the league in doubles with 45 in 133 games. Since the start of the Modern Era in 1901, only five players—Nap Lajoie, Tris Speaker-2x, Bob Meusel, Frankie Frisch and Ben Chapman have had as many doubles in few games.

In 1966, Yastrzemski averaged .278, hit 16 home runs, 80 RBIs, and led the league in doubles for a third time with 39. He was also selected for his third All-Star game. During that year's offseason Yastrzemski spent his time working out to improve his stamina and gain extra muscle.

=== 1967 ===
Yastrzemski enjoyed his best season in 1967, when he won the American League Triple Crown with a .326 batting average, 44 home runs (tied with Harmon Killebrew), and 121 RBIs. Yastrzemski's Triple Crown win in 1967 was the last time a major league hitter won the Batting Triple Crown until Miguel Cabrera in the 2012 season (conversely, six different pitchers have since won the pitchers' version). He was voted Most Valuable Player almost unanimously (one voter chose César Tovar of the Twins). His 12.4 WAR was the highest since Babe Ruth's 1927 season.

1967 was the season of the "Impossible Dream" for the Red Sox (referring to the hit song from the musical Man of La Mancha), who rebounded from a ninth-place finish a year before to win the American League pennant (their first since 1946) on the last day of the season. With the Red Sox battling as part of a four-team pennant race, Yastrzemski hit .513 (23 hits in 44 at-bats) with five home runs and 16 runs batted in over the last two weeks of the season, and the Red Sox finished a mere one game ahead of the Detroit Tigers and Minnesota Twins. The Red Sox went into the final two games of the season trailing the Twins by one game and leading the Tigers by one-half game. Their final two games were against Minnesota, with the pennant and home run title (hence, the triple crown) on the line. In the Saturday game, Yastrzemski went 3 for 4 with a home run and 4 RBI. Killebrew also homered, but the Red Sox won, 6–4. Thus, the teams went into the final game tied for first place, and Yastrzemski and Killebrew were tied with 44 home runs apiece. In the final game, neither player homered, but Yastrzemski went 4 for 4 with 2 RBI in a 5-3 Red Sox win. In the two games with the pennant on the line, Yastrzemski was 7 for 8 with six RBIs.

The Red Sox lost the World Series four games to three to the St. Louis Cardinals, losing three times to Bob Gibson. Yastrzemski batted .400 with 3 home runs and 5 RBI in the series. After the season, he fell one vote shy of a unanimous MVP award. He also won the Hickok Belt as top professional athlete of the year and Sports Illustrated magazine's "Sportsman of the Year" Award.

In an article he co-wrote for the November 1967 issue of SPORT magazine, Yastrzemski credited Boston's remarkable season to manager Dick Williams and an infusion of youth, including Rico Petrocelli and Tony Conigliaro. Of Williams, Yastrzemski wrote: "He got rid of all the individuality, made us into a team, gave us an incentive, and made us want to win."

=== Later career (1968–1983) ===
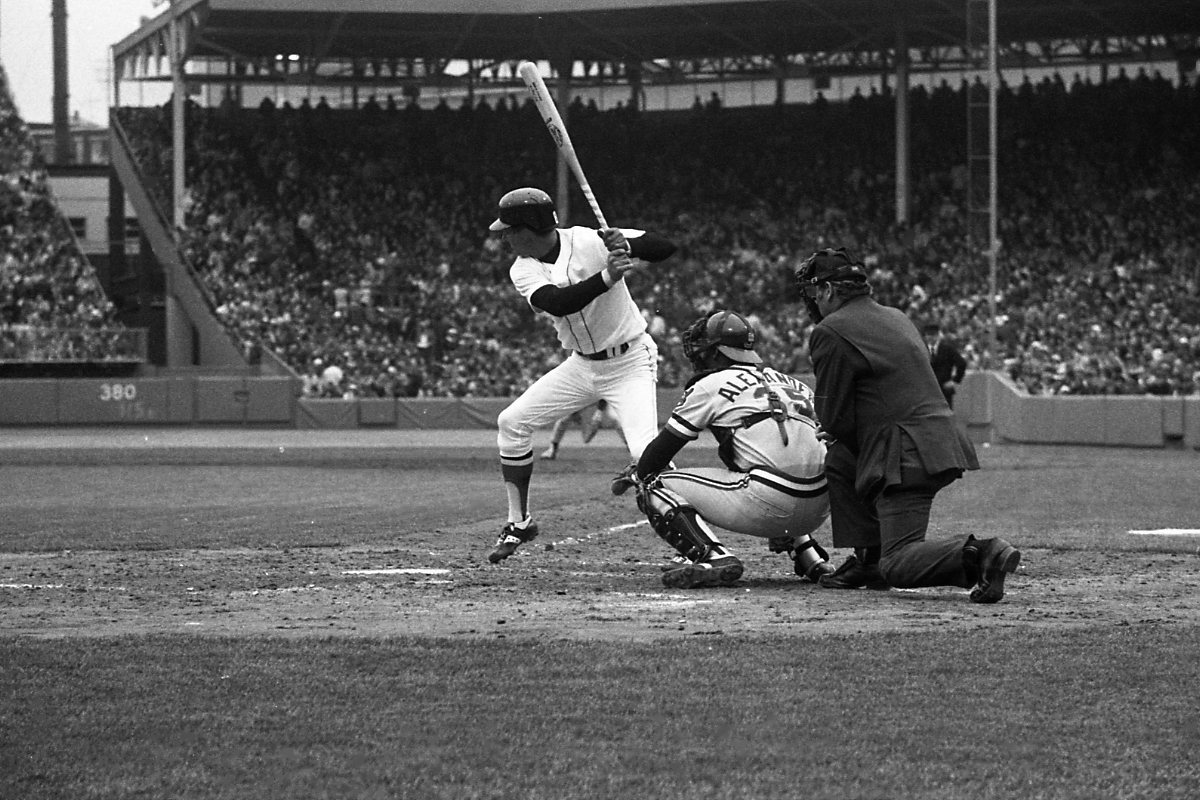
Yastrzemski bats at Fenway Park (c. 1979)

In 1968, Yastrzemski hit 23 home runs and drove in 74 RBIs. He led the league in OPS with .922 and in walks with 119, and once again won the batting championship with a .301 average. Because of the competitive advantages pitchers enjoyed between 1963 and 1968 (before the lowering of the pitcher's mound following the 1968 season) Yastrzemski's .301 mark in the "Year of the Pitcher" is the lowest average ever recorded by a batting champion in Major League history. He was also the only hitter in the American League to bat .300 that season against such formidable pitching and led the league in on-base percentage and walks. That year, Yastrzemski also secured his fourth Gold Glove Award and made his fifth All-Star Game appearance.

In 1969, Yastrzemski had the first of two consecutive 40-home-run seasons as he helped lead the Red Sox to a third-place finish that year and the next. He drove in 111 runs that season, finished with a .255 batting average, and won his fifth Gold Glove Award. In the 1970 All-Star Game, he collected four hits, tying the record, and was named the game's MVP despite being on the losing team. He is one of only two players to win the All-Star Game MVP Award while playing for the losing team, the other being Brooks Robinson in 1966. That season, Yastrzemski led the league in slugging percentage .592, OPS 1.044, and total bases 335. His .329 batting average that year was a career high, though he finished second in the batting race behind the California Angels’ Alex Johnson by less than .001. In 1970, Yastrzemski also led the league in slugging and on-base percentage while finishing third in home runs. That year, he recorded a career-best 23 stolen bases, making him only the second player in Red Sox history to hit 20 or more home runs and steal 20 or more bases in a single season, the first being Jackie Jensen.

In the early 1970s, Yastrzemski suffered hand injuries that significantly reduced his power and productivity until he recovered. He also sustained a permanent shoulder injury that further diminished his power and forced him to change his distinctive batting stance. During the 1971 season, Yastrzemski hit 15 home runs, drove in 70 RBIs, and finished with a .254 batting average. He also won his sixth Gold Glove Award. In February of that year, Yastrzemski signed a three-year contract extension with the Red Sox reportedly worth $500,000, making him the highest-paid player in professional baseball history at the time. In 1972, Yastrzemski hit 12 home runs and finished with a .264 batting average.

Yastrzemski finished in the top 10 in batting average (.296) and ranked in the top three in both on-base percentage (.407) and walks in 1973 (105). He also hit 19 home runs and drove in 98 RBIs. Yastrzemski volunteered to take over as the Red Sox's third baseman in August 1973 following the departure of Rico Petrocelli from the lineup, and he finished the season at that position.[34] In 1974, he led the league in runs scored with 93. He also batted over .300 for the sixth and final time in his career and hit 15 home runs. Despite his hand injuries, he hit 61 home runs from 1971 to 1974 as the Red Sox finished second twice and third twice.

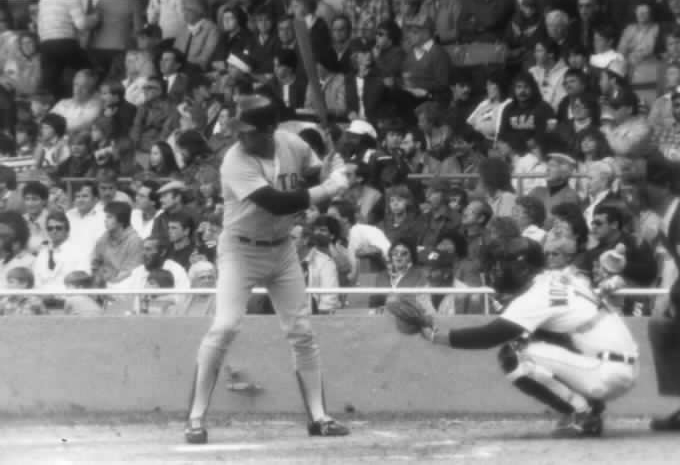
Yastrzemski bats at Tiger Stadium

In the 1975 All-Star Game, Yastrzemski was called upon to pinch-hit in the sixth inning with two men on base and the American League trailing 3–0. Without wearing a batting helmet, he hit Tom Seaver's first pitch for a home run to tie the score. The three-run homer accounted for the only runs the American League scored that night, as they ultimately lost 6–3. During the regular season, Yastrzemski batted .269 with 14 home runs and 60 RBIs; however, he excelled during the postseason. In the American League Championship Series against Oakland, he went 5-for-11 with a home run and two RBIs.

Yastrzemski scored 11 runs and batted .350 during the 10 postseason games. However, he and the Red Sox suffered another World Series loss in 1975, falling to the Cincinnati Reds four games to three. He made the final out in Game 7 on a fly ball to center field while the Red Sox trailed by one run. Coincidentally, he also made the final out of the 1978 American League East tie-breaker game, popping out in foul territory to third base. That game featured Bucky Dent’s famous home run (although Reggie Jackson’s homer ultimately proved to be the winning run). Earlier in the game, Yastrzemski opened the scoring with a home run off left-handed pitcher Ron Guidry, who was having a career year (25 wins, 3 losses, and a 1.74 ERA). It was the only home run the Cy Young Award winner allowed to a left-handed hitter all season.

On May 19, 1976, Yastrzemski hit three home runs against the Detroit Tigers at Tiger Stadium. He then went to Yankee Stadium and hit two more, tying the major league record of five home runs in two consecutive games. He finished the year batting .269 with 21 home runs. On July 14, 1977, Yastrzemski recorded his 2,655th hit off Cleveland's Al Fitzmorris, surpassing Ted Williams for the most hits in Red Sox history. That year, Yastrzemski batted .296, hit 28 home runs, and won his seventh and final Gold Glove Award, after tying an MLB record with 1.000 fielding percentage during the season. Over 12 seasons as a left fielder, Yastrzemski won seven Gold Glove Awards and led the team in assists seven times.

In 1978, Yastrzemski, then 39, was one of the five oldest players in the league. That year, he batted .277 and hit 17 home runs. On July 24, 1979, Yastrzemski hit his 400th career home run off Oakland's Mike Morgan, breaking a 3–3 tie in the bottom of the seventh inning as the Red Sox went on to win 7–3. On June 16, he recorded his 1,000th extra-base hit. On September 12, 1979, Yastrzemski achieved another milestone when he collected his 3,000th career hit off New York's Jim Beattie. This made him the first American League player with 3,000 career hits and 400 home runs. He finished the year with a .270 batting average and was selected to his 15th consecutive All-Star Game.

In 1980, Yastrzemski batted .275 and hit 15 home runs; however, he missed the All-Star Game for the first time since 1965. The 1981 season saw Yastrzemski bat .246 with seven home runs. In 1982, playing primarily as a designated hitter, an early-season hitting streak placed him among the league's leading hitters. He was featured on the cover of Sports Illustrated and also played in that year's All-Star Game. That season, he batted .275 and hit 16 home runs.

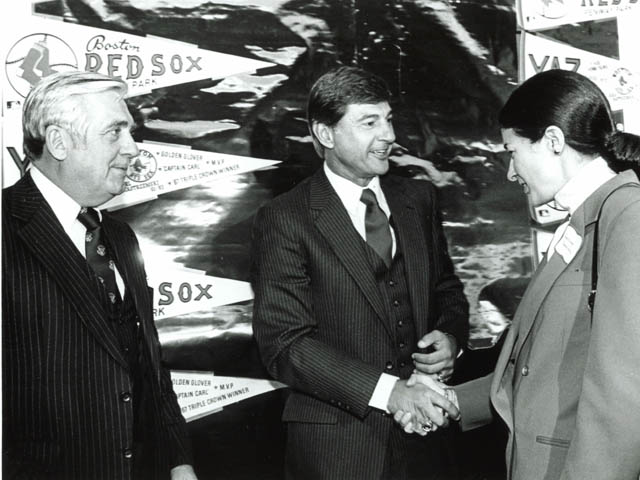
Yastrzemski with Olympia Snowe following his retirement in 1983

Yastrzemski played his final year during the 1983 season. He batted .266, hit 10 home runs, and was selected to his 18th and final All-Star Game. During his second-to-last game on October 1, 1983, in front of a sold-out crowd of 33,491 at Fenway Park, the Red Sox held Carl Yastrzemski Day. There was an hour-long pregame ceremony celebrating his career. During his speech, he asked for a moment of silence for his mother and for former Red Sox owner Tom Yawkey. After thanking his family and the entire Red Sox organization, he concluded his remarks by saying, "New England, I love you." He recorded his 3,419th and final hit against Cleveland's Bud Anderson during his final game on October 2.

== Retirement ==
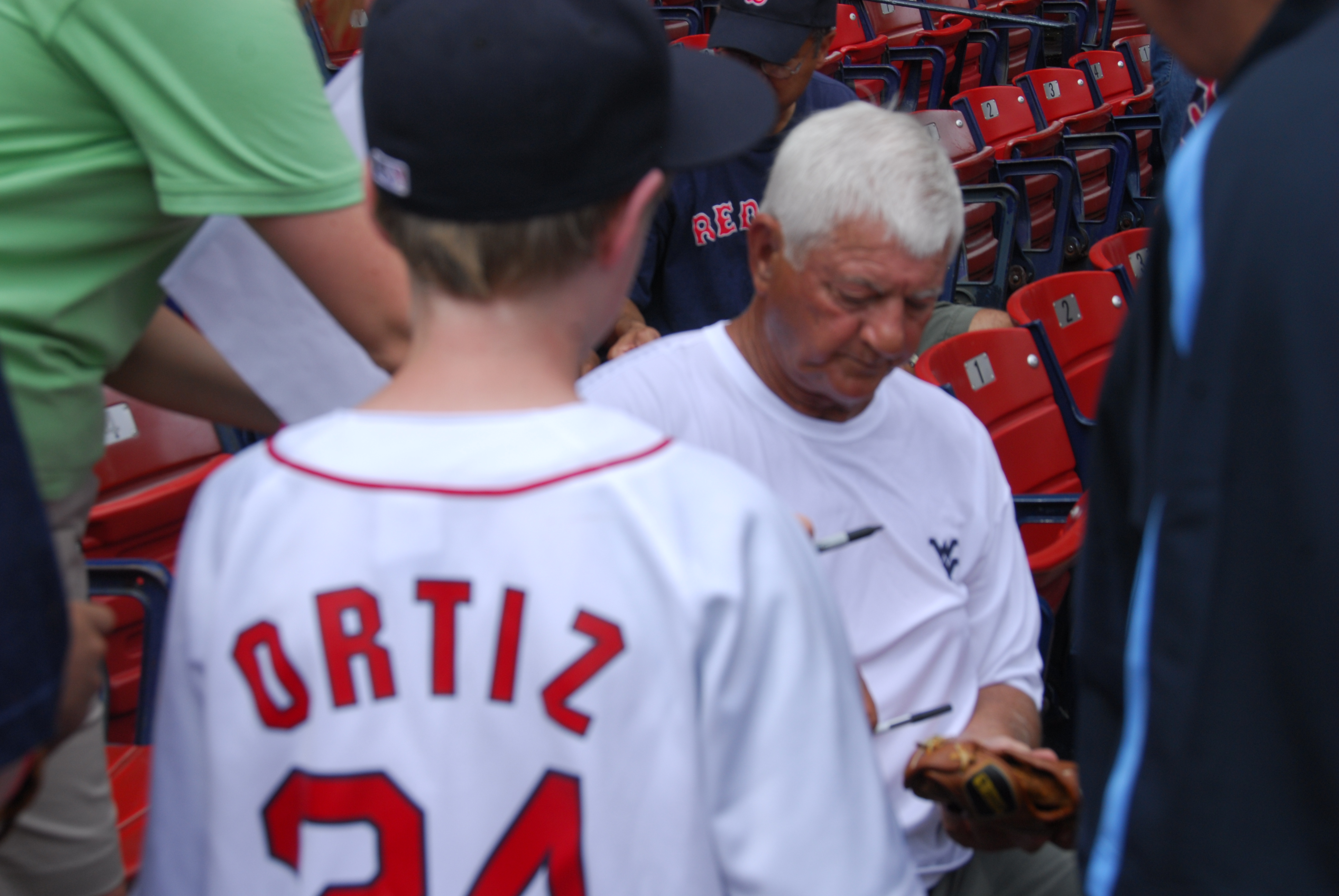
Yastrzemski signing an autograph at Fenway Park in 2008

Yastrzemski retired at the end of the 1983 season at age 44, though he wrote in his autobiography Yaz that he was planning on playing the 1984 season until he was tired from a prolonged midseason slump. He also said that had he known how good Roger Clemens would be, he would have played in 1984 to have had a chance to play with him. Yastrzemski thought that Tommy John was one of the hardest pitchers for him to hit against. This surprised John, who remembered Yastrzemski hitting him well while he was with the White Sox (1965–71). John concluded that Yastrzemski must be remembering his years with the Yankees beginning in 1979, when John fared better in their matchups.

After retirement, Yastrzemski delved into other professions such as sportscasting, along with working as marketing director for a meat manufacturer.

Along with Johnny Pesky, Yastrzemski raised the 2004 World Series championship banner over Fenway Park. He is still involved with the Red Sox previously working as a minor-league hitting instructor, he then worked as a roving instructor with the Red Sox and helped batters during Spring Training till his retirement in 2020. He was honored by throwing out the ceremonial first pitch for Game 1 of the 2004, 2007, 2013, and 2018 World Series. Yastrzemski threw out the first pitch at Fenway Park on April 4, 2025, after a ceremony honoring the 50th anniversary of the 1975 Boston Red Sox team.

== Legacy ==
Carl Yastrzemski's number 8 was retired by the Boston Red Sox in 1989.

He had a long career with only one team, 23 seasons, a record he shares with Brooks Robinson of the Baltimore Orioles. His final career statistics include 3,308 games played (second all-time and the most with a single team), 3,419 hits, 646 doubles, 452 home runs, 1,844 RBIs, and a batting average of .285. He had 1,845 walks in his career, and 1,157 extra base hits. Yastrzemski was the first player to collect over 3,000 hits and 400 home runs solely in the American League (the feat has since been accomplished by Cal Ripken Jr.). He reached base 5,304 times in his career (not including errors), which is the fifth most in AL/NL history. He was named to the All-Star Game 18 times. Yastrzemski won three American League batting championships in his career. In addition, he trails only Ty Cobb and Derek Jeter in hits collected with a single team, and trails only Cobb, Jeter and Tris Speaker in hits collected playing in the American League. Yastrzemski is also Fenway Park's all-time leader in hits, doubles, and RBIs. By the time of his retirement, he was the all-time leader in plate appearances, a record since surpassed by Pete Rose.

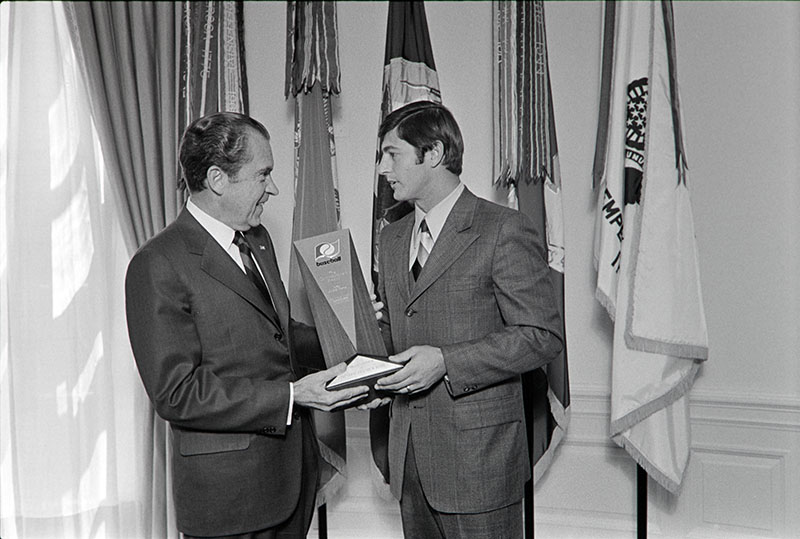
Yastrzemski presenting his 1970 MLB All-Star Game MVP trophy to 37th President Richard Nixon.

As one of the top players of his era, he was elected to the Baseball Hall of Fame in 1989, his first year of eligibility, with the support of 94% of voters. He is one of the few Hall of Famers to directly succeed another Hall of Famer at the same position. For his entire career with the Red Sox, he wore uniform number 8. The Red Sox retired this number on August 6, 1989, after Yastrzemski was elected to the Hall of Fame. In 1999, Yastrzemski ranked 72nd on The Sporting News' list of the 100 Greatest Baseball Players. That same season, he was named a finalist to the Major League Baseball All-Century Team. Prior to his induction in the Baseball Hall of Fame, Yastrzemski was inducted into the National Polish-American Sports Hall of Fame in 1986. He was inducted into the Suffolk Sports Hall of Fame on Long Island in the Baseball Category with the Class of 1990. He was inducted as an inaugural member of the Boston Red Sox Hall of Fame in 1995. The Red Sox later honored him with a statue outside Fenway Park on September 23, 2013. In 2022 ESPN ranked him 61st on their list of the 100 Greatest MLB players of all time.

Yastrzemski proved a worthy successor for Red Sox's superstar left fielder Ted Williams, whom he took over for upon joining the league. In fact, he is often regarded as one of the best players in Red Sox history. In acknowledgement of Yastrzemski's loyalty to the team, a 2022 New York Times article wrote, "there is no man alive today whose Red Sox career matched or eclipsed Yastrzemski’s." An additional 2026 NESN article added, "Carl Yastrzemski’s impact on the Red Sox is measured in more than highlights. It’s in the way he defined a generation of Fenway baseball, delivered one of the franchise’s most legendary seasons in 1967, and retired with a Hall of Fame résumé that still reads like a blueprint for what a 'Red Sox lifer' looks like."

The Carl Yastrzemski Award is given annually to the most outstanding high school baseball player in Suffolk County, Long Island, New York. In April 2022, a historic marker honoring Yastrzemski as "one of the greatest baseball players of all time" was unveiled at Bridgehampton High School's new baseball field.

=== In popular culture ===
In the season 2 episode of The Simpsons "Three Men and a Comic Book" Martin and Milhouse attempt to buy a 1973 Topps card of Carl Yastrzemski, "when he had the big sideburns."

== Career statistics ==
Season	Team	G	AB	H	HR	RBI	BB	SO	AVG	OBP	SLG	OPS
1961	Boston Red Sox	148	583	155	11	80	50	96	.266	.324	.396	.721
1962	Boston Red Sox	160	646	191	19	94	66	82	.296	.363	.469	.832
1963	Boston Red Sox	151	570	183	14	68	95	72	.321	.418	.475	.894
1964	Boston Red Sox	151	567	164	15	67	75	90	.289	.374	.451	.825
1965	Boston Red Sox	133	494	154	20	72	70	58	.312	.395	.536	.932
1966	Boston Red Sox	160	594	165	16	80	84	60	.278	.368	.431	.799
1967	Boston Red Sox	161	579	189	44	121	91	69	.326	.418	.622	1.040
1968	Boston Red Sox	157	539	162	23	74	119	90	.301	.426	.495	.922
1969	Boston Red Sox	162	603	154	40	111	101	91	.255	.362	.507	.870
1970	Boston Red Sox	161	566	186	40	102	128	66	.329	.452	.592	1.044
1971	Boston Red Sox	148	508	129	15	70	106	60	.254	.381	.392	.772
1972	Boston Red Sox	125	455	120	12	68	67	44	.264	.357	.391	.748
1973	Boston Red Sox	152	540	160	19	95	105	58	.296	.407	.463	.870
1974	Boston Red Sox	148	515	155	15	79	104	48	.301	.414	.445	.859
1975	Boston Red Sox	149	543	146	14	60	87	67	.269	.371	.405	.776
1976	Boston Red Sox	155	546	146	21	102	80	67	.267	.357	.432	.790
1977	Boston Red Sox	150	558	165	28	102	73	40	.296	.372	.505	.877
1978	Boston Red Sox	144	523	145	17	81	76	44	.277	.367	.423	.790
1979	Boston Red Sox	147	518	140	21	87	62	46	.270	.346	.450	.796
1980	Boston Red Sox	105	364	100	15	50	44	38	.275	.350	.462	.812
1981	Boston Red Sox	91	338	83	7	53	49	28	.246	.338	.355	.693
1982	Boston Red Sox	131	459	126	16	72	59	50	.275	.358	.431	.789
1983	Boston Red Sox	119	380	101	10	56	54	29	.266	.359	.408	.767

== Personal life ==
In August 2008 Yastrzemski underwent emergency triple-bypass heart surgery at Massachusetts General Hospital after experiencing chest pain. He was released from the hospital the following week after a successful recovery.

Yastrzemski has a long-standing relationship with The Jimmy Fund, which supports pediatric and adult cancer research and care at the Dana-Farber Cancer Institute. During his final MLB game in 1983 he famously donated his game-worn jerseys for auction to support the charity.

=== Family ===
In 1960, Yastrzemski married his first wife Carol; together they had four children: Sue, Mary Ann, Carolyn and Carl Jr. Carl Jr., known as Mike, played college baseball for the Florida State Seminoles and was drafted by the Atlanta Braves in the third round in 1984. He started his professional career with the Durham Bulls. Eventually, he played for two Chicago White Sox affiliated teams in the Triple-A Pacific Coast League, first with the Hawaii Islanders in 1987 and then ending his playing career with the Vancouver Canadians in 1988. He died in 2004 at age 43 from a blood clot after having hip surgery.

Carl's grandson Mike Yastrzemski (Carl Jr.'s son) plays for the Atlanta Braves. He was drafted by the Red Sox in 2009 and the Seattle Mariners in 2012. However, he did not sign with either team, instead choosing to play college baseball for the Vanderbilt Commodores. He signed with the Baltimore Orioles after being selected in the 2013 MLB draft. He rose through Baltimore's farm system, reaching Triple-A with the Norfolk Tides by 2016. In March 2019, he was traded to the San Francisco Giants organization, and he made his MLB debut with the Giants on May 25, 2019. On September 17, as a member of the Giants, in his first game played at Fenway Park, Mike went 2-for-7 with a home run and a double. In the next game of the series on September 18, Carl threw out the ceremonial first pitch to Mike. Yastrzemski became a great-grandfather in 2021 when Mike's first child Quinley was born.

In 2002, Yastrzemski married his second wife Nancy. The two currently reside in Boxford, Massachusetts.

=== Publications ===
Following the 1967 season Yastrzemski released his first autobiography Yaz in 1968 which he co wrote alongside Al Hirshberg. In 1990 Yastrzemski released his second autobiography Yaz: Baseball, the Wall, and Me which was co written with Gerald Eskenazi.

== Career regular season statistics ==
Through the end of the 2026 season, on the all-time lists for Major League Baseball, Yastrzemski ranks first for games played for one team, second for games played, third for at-bats, sixth for bases on balls, ninth for doubles, ninth for hits, tenth for total bases, 13th for extra-base hits, and 15th for RBIs.

Category	G	AB	R	H	2B	3B	HR	RBI	TB	XBH	SB	CS	BB	AVG	OBP	SLG	FLD%
Total	3,308	11,988	1,816	3,419	646	59	452	1,844	5,539	1,157	168	116	1,845	.285	.379	.462	.988

== Career accomplishments ==
=== MLB ===
- AL MVP (1967)
- Triple Crown (1967)
- 18× All-Star (1963, 1965, 1966, 1967, 1968, 1969, 1970, 1971, 1972, 1973, 1974, 1975, 1976, 1977, 1978, 1979, 1982, 1983)
- 7× Gold Glove Award (1963, 1965, 1967, 1968, 1969, 1971, 1977)
- 3× AL batting champion (1963, 1967, 1968)
- AL home run leader (1967)
- AL RBI leader (1967)
- All-Star game MVP (1970)
- Boston Red Sox No. 8 retired

=== Minor league ===
- Carolina League Most Valuable Player (1959)
- Carolina League Rookie of the Year (1959)
- American Association champion (1959)

=== Halls of Fame ===
- National Polish-American Sports Hall of Fame (1986)
- Baseball Hall of Fame (1989)
- Suffolk Sports Hall of Fame (1990)
- Inaugural member of the Boston Red Sox Hall of Fame (1995)
- New York State Public High School Athletic Association Hall of Fame (2014)
- Bridgehampton Hall of Fame (2016)

=== Media ===
- Associated Press Athlete of the Year Award (1967)
- Sports Illustrated Sportsperson of the Year (1967)
- The Sporting News MLB Player of the Year Award (1967)
- Ranked 72nd on The Sporting News' list of the 100 Greatest Baseball Players in 1999.

=== Other honors ===
- Hickok Belt (1967)
- Received an Honorary Doctor of Physical Education from Providence College (1983)
- Received an Honorary Doctor of Humane Letters degree from Boston University (1988)

== See also ==
- List of Boston Red Sox team records
- List of Major League Baseball annual doubles leaders
- List of Major League Baseball annual runs scored leaders
- List of Major League Baseball career assists as a left fielder leaders
- List of Major League Baseball career bases on balls leaders
- List of Major League Baseball career doubles leaders
- List of Major League Baseball career games played leaders
- List of Major League Baseball career home run leaders
- List of Major League Baseball career hits leaders
- List of Major League Baseball career putouts as a left fielder leaders
- List of Major League Baseball career runs batted in leaders
- List of Major League Baseball career runs scored leaders
- List of Major League Baseball career total bases leaders
- List of Major League Baseball doubles records
- List of Major League Baseball players to hit for the cycle
- List of Major League Baseball players who spent their entire career with one franchise
- Major League Baseball titles leaders
- Major League Baseball Triple Crown

Achievements
Preceded by Jim Fregosi	Hitting for the cycle May 14, 1965	Succeeded by Billy Williams
