= 1963 Cleveland Indians season =

1963 Cleveland Indians
- League: American League
- Ballpark: Cleveland Municipal Stadium
- City: Cleveland, Ohio
- Owners: Gabe Paul
- General managers: Gabe Paul
- Managers: Birdie Tebbetts
- Television: WJW-TV (Ken Coleman, Bob Neal)
- Radio: WERE (Jimmy Dudley, Harry Jones)

The 1963 Cleveland Indians season was a season in American baseball. The team finished tied for fifth in the American League with a record of 79–83, 25 1/2 games behind the New York Yankees.

== Offseason ==
- November 26, 1962: Lou Piniella was drafted from the Indians by the Washington Senators in the 1962 first-year draft.
- November 26, 1962: Bob Lipski was drafted by the Indians from the Philadelphia Phillies in the 1962 rule 5 draft.
- March 1963: Rubén Gómez was signed as a free agent by the Indians.
- Prior to 1963 season: Duke Carmel was acquired from the Indians by the St. Louis Cardinals.

== Regular season ==
=== Season standings ===
American League
| Team | W | L | Pct. | GB | Home | Road |
|---|---|---|---|---|---|---|
| New York Yankees | 104 | 57 | .646 | — | 58‍–‍22 | 46‍–‍35 |
| Chicago White Sox | 94 | 68 | .580 | 10½ | 49‍–‍33 | 45‍–‍35 |
| Minnesota Twins | 91 | 70 | .565 | 13 | 48‍–‍33 | 43‍–‍37 |
| Baltimore Orioles | 86 | 76 | .531 | 18½ | 48‍–‍33 | 38‍–‍43 |
| Cleveland Indians | 79 | 83 | .488 | 25½ | 41‍–‍40 | 38‍–‍43 |
| Detroit Tigers | 79 | 83 | .488 | 25½ | 47‍–‍34 | 32‍–‍49 |
| Boston Red Sox | 76 | 85 | .472 | 28 | 44‍–‍36 | 32‍–‍49 |
| Kansas City Athletics | 73 | 89 | .451 | 31½ | 36‍–‍45 | 37‍–‍44 |
| Los Angeles Angels | 70 | 91 | .435 | 34 | 39‍–‍42 | 31‍–‍49 |
| Washington Senators | 56 | 106 | .346 | 48½ | 31‍–‍49 | 25‍–‍57 |

=== Record vs. opponents ===
1963 American League record Sources:
| Team | BAL | BOS | CWS | CLE | DET | KCA | LAA | MIN | NYY | WAS |
|---|---|---|---|---|---|---|---|---|---|---|
| Baltimore | — | 7–11 | 7–11 | 10–8 | 13–5 | 9–9 | 9–9 | 9–9 | 7–11 | 15–3 |
| Boston | 11–7 | — | 8–10 | 10–8 | 9–9 | 7–11 | 9–8 | 7–11 | 6–12 | 9–9 |
| Chicago | 11–7 | 10–8 | — | 11–7 | 11–7 | 12–6 | 10–8 | 8–10 | 8–10 | 13–5 |
| Cleveland | 8–10 | 8–10 | 7–11 | — | 10–8 | 11–7 | 10–8 | 5–13 | 7–11 | 13–5 |
| Detroit | 5–13 | 9–9 | 7–11 | 8–10 | — | 13–5 | 12–6 | 8–10 | 8–10 | 9–9 |
| Kansas City | 9–9 | 11–7 | 6–12 | 7–11 | 5–13 | — | 10–8 | 9–9 | 6–12 | 10–8 |
| Los Angeles | 9–9 | 8–9 | 8–10 | 8–10 | 6–12 | 8–10 | — | 9–9 | 5–13 | 9–9 |
| Minnesota | 9–9 | 11–7 | 10–8 | 13–5 | 10–8 | 9–9 | 9–9 | — | 6–11 | 14–4 |
| New York | 11–7 | 12–6 | 10–8 | 11–7 | 10–8 | 12–6 | 13–5 | 11–6 | — | 14–4 |
| Washington | 3–15 | 9–9 | 5–13 | 5–13 | 9–9 | 8–10 | 9–9 | 4–14 | 4–14 | — |

=== Notable transactions ===
- April 2, 1963: Ellis Burton was purchased by the Indians from the Houston Colt .45s.
- May 8, 1963: Bob Lipski was returned by the Indians to the Philadelphia Phillies.
- May 25, 1963: Doc Edwards and $100,000 were traded by the Indians to the Kansas City Athletics for Joe Azcue and Dick Howser.
- May 27, 1963: Ellis Burton was purchased from the Indians by the Chicago Cubs.

=== Opening Day Lineup ===
Opening Day Starters
| # | Name | Position |
|---|---|---|
| 25 | Vic Davalillo | CF |
| 16 | Tony Martínez | SS |
| 14 | Tito Francona | LF |
| 15 | Fred Whitfield | 1B |
| 9 | Johnny Romano | C |
| 29 | Ellis Burton | RF |
| 10 | Max Alvis | 3B |
| 12 | Woodie Held | 2B |
| 33 | Mudcat Grant | P |

=== Roster ===
1963 Cleveland Indians
Roster
| Pitchers: 36 Ted Abernathy; 40 Bob Allen; 39 Gary Bell; 43 Jack Curtis; 30 Dick Donovan; 33 Mudcat Grant; 37 Tommy John; 31 Jack Kralick; 32 Barry Latman; 34 Sam McDowell; 42 Ron Nischwitz; 31 Jim Perry; 35 Pedro Ramos; 43 Gordon Seyfried; 48 Jerry Walker; 38 Early Wynn | Catchers: 6 Joe Azcue; 6 Doc Edwards; 5 Jim Lawrence; 7 Bob Lipski; 5 Cal Neeman; 9,5 Johnny Romano; 5 Sammy Taylor; Infielders: 11 Joe Adcock; 10 Max Alvis; 16 Larry Brown; 17 Mike de la Hoz; 12 Woodie Held; 18 Dick Howser; 14 Jerry Kindall; 16 Tony Martínez; 15 Fred Whitfield | Outfielders: 23 Tommie Agee; 29 Ellis Burton; 21 Bob Chance; 25 Vic Davalillo; 24 Tito Francona; 23 Gene Green; 27 Willie Kirkland; 22 Al Luplow; 28 Willie Tasby | Manager: 1 Birdie Tebbetts; Coaches: 2 Mel Harder (Pitching); 3 George Strickland (Third base); 4 Elmer Valo (First base) |

== Player stats ==
=== Batting ===
==== Starters by position ====
Note: Pos = Position; G = Games played; AB = At bats; H = Hits; Avg. = Batting average; HR = Home runs; RBI = Runs batted in

| Pos | Player | G | AB | H | Avg. | HR | RBI |
|---|---|---|---|---|---|---|---|
| C | Joe Azcue | 94 | 320 | 91 | .284 | 14 | 46 |
| 1B | Fred Whitfield | 109 | 346 | 87 | .251 | 21 | 54 |
| 2B | Woodie Held | 133 | 416 | 103 | .248 | 17 | 61 |
| SS | Larry Brown | 74 | 247 | 63 | .255 | 5 | 18 |
| 3B | Max Alvis | 158 | 602 | 165 | .274 | 22 | 67 |
| LF | Tito Francona | 142 | 500 | 114 | .228 | 10 | 41 |
| CF | Vic Davalillo | 90 | 370 | 108 | .292 | 7 | 36 |
| RF | Al Luplow | 100 | 295 | 69 | .234 | 7 | 27 |

==== Other batters ====
Note: G = Games played; AB = At bats; H = Hits; Avg. = Batting average; HR = Home runs; RBI = Runs batted in

| Player | G | AB | H | Avg. | HR | RBI |
|---|---|---|---|---|---|---|
| Willie Kirkland | 127 | 427 | 98 | .230 | 15 | 47 |
| Joe Adcock | 97 | 283 | 71 | .251 | 13 | 49 |
| Johnny Romano | 89 | 255 | 55 | .216 | 10 | 34 |
| Jerry Kindall | 86 | 234 | 48 | .205 | 5 | 20 |
| Dick Howser | 49 | 162 | 40 | .247 | 1 | 10 |
| Mike de la Hoz | 67 | 150 | 40 | .267 | 5 | 25 |
| Tony Martínez | 43 | 141 | 22 | .156 | 0 | 8 |
| Willie Tasby | 52 | 116 | 26 | .224 | 4 | 5 |
| Gene Green | 43 | 78 | 16 | .205 | 2 | 7 |
| Bob Chance | 16 | 52 | 15 | .288 | 2 | 7 |
| Doc Edwards | 10 | 31 | 8 | .258 | 0 | 0 |
| Ellis Burton | 26 | 31 | 6 | .194 | 1 | 1 |
| Tommie Agee | 13 | 27 | 4 | .148 | 1 | 3 |
| Sammy Taylor | 4 | 10 | 3 | .300 | 0 | 1 |
| Cal Neeman | 9 | 9 | 0 | .000 | 0 | 0 |
| Bob Lipski | 2 | 1 | 0 | .000 | 0 | 0 |
| Jim Lawrence | 2 | 0 | 0 | ---- | 0 | 0 |

=== Pitching ===
==== Starting pitchers ====
Note: G = Games pitched; IP = Innings pitched; W = Wins; L = Losses; ERA = Earned run average; SO = Strikeouts

| Player | G | IP | W | L | ERA | SO |
|---|---|---|---|---|---|---|
| Mudcat Grant | 38 | 229.1 | 13 | 14 | 3.69 | 157 |
| Dick Donovan | 30 | 206.0 | 11 | 13 | 4.24 | 84 |
| Jack Kralick | 28 | 197.1 | 13 | 9 | 2.92 | 116 |
| Sam McDowell | 14 | 65.0 | 3 | 5 | 4.85 | 63 |

==== Other pitchers ====
Note: G = Games pitched; IP = Innings pitched; W = Wins; L = Losses; ERA = Earned run average; SO = Strikeouts

| Player | G | IP | W | L | ERA | SO |
|---|---|---|---|---|---|---|
| Pedro Ramos | 36 | 184.2 | 9 | 8 | 3.12 | 169 |
| Barry Latman | 38 | 149.1 | 7 | 12 | 4.94 | 133 |
| Early Wynn | 20 | 55.1 | 1 | 2 | 2.28 | 29 |
| Tommy John | 6 | 20.1 | 0 | 2 | 2.21 | 9 |
| Gordon Seyfried | 3 | 7.1 | 0 | 1 | 1.23 | 1 |

==== Relief pitchers ====
Note: G = Games pitched; W = Wins; L = Losses; SV = Saves; ERA = Earned run average; SO = Strikeouts

| Player | G | W | L | SV | ERA | SO |
|---|---|---|---|---|---|---|
| Ted Abernathy | 43 | 7 | 2 | 12 | 2.88 | 47 |
| Gary Bell | 58 | 8 | 5 | 5 | 2.95 | 98 |
| Bob Allen | 43 | 1 | 2 | 2 | 4.66 | 51 |
| Jerry Walker | 39 | 6 | 6 | 1 | 4.91 | 41 |
| Ron Nischwitz | 14 | 0 | 2 | 1 | 6.48 | 10 |
| Jim Perry | 5 | 0 | 0 | 0 | 5.23 | 7 |
| Jack Curtis | 4 | 0 | 0 | 0 | 18.00 | 3 |

== Awards and honors ==
All-Star Game

- Mudcat Grant, reserve

== Farm system ==
| Level | Team | League | Manager |
|---|---|---|---|
| AAA | Jacksonville Suns | International League | Ben Geraghty and Casey Wise |
| AA | Charleston Indians | Eastern League | Johnny Lipon |
| A | Burlington Indians | Carolina League | Patrick Colgan |
| A | Dubuque Packers | Midwest League | Walt Novick |
| A | Grand Forks Chiefs | Northern League | Ray Dabek |

LEAGUE CHAMPIONS: Charleston, Grand Forks
