= List of Major League Baseball players (L) =

The following is a list of Major League Baseball players, retired or active. As of the end of the 2011 season, there have been 816 players with a last name that begins with L who have been on a major league roster at some point.

== L ==
For reasons of space, this list has been split into two pages:

- Chet Laabs through Sixto Lezcano
- Steve Libby through Jim Lyttle
