= List of Major League Baseball players (La–Lh) =

The following is a list of Major League Baseball players, retired or active.

== La through Lh ==
| Name | Debut | Final game | Position | Teams | Ref |
|---|---|---|---|---|---|
| Chet Laabs | May 5, 1937 | June 3, 1947 | Outfielder | Detroit Tigers, St. Louis Browns, Philadelphia Athletics | |
| Josh Labandeira | September 17, 2004 | October 3, 2004 | Utility infielder | Montreal Expos | |
| Clem Labine | April 18, 1950 | April 24, 1962 | Pitcher | Brooklyn/Los Angeles Dodgers, Detroit Tigers, Pittsburgh Pirates, New York Mets | |
| Coco Laboy | April 8, 1969 | May 16, 1973 | Third baseman | Montreal Expos | |
| Bob Lacey | May 13, 1977 | September 26, 1984 | Pitcher | Oakland Athletics, Cleveland Indians, Texas Rangers, California Angels, San Francisco Giants | |
| Candy LaChance | August 15, 1893 | April 28, 1905 | First baseman | Brooklyn Grooms/Bridegrooms, Baltimore Orioles (NL), Cleveland Blues (AL), Boston Americans | |
| Marcel Lachemann | June 4, 1969 | April 25, 1971 | Pitcher | Oakland Athletics | |
| Rene Lachemann | May 4, 1965 | June 8, 1968 | Catcher | Kansas City/Oakland Athletics | |
| Al Lachowicz | September 13, 1983 | October 2, 1983 | Pitcher | Texas Rangers | |
| John Lackey | June 24, 2002 | | Pitcher | Anaheim Angels/Los Angeles Angels of Anaheim, Boston Red Sox | |
| William Lackey | October 2, 1890 | October 2, 1890 | Pitcher | Philadelphia Athletics (AA) | |
| Pete LaCock | September 6, 1972 | October 5, 1980 | First baseman | Chicago Cubs, Kansas City Royals | |
| Frank LaCorte | September 8, 1975 | September 24, 1984 | Pitcher | Atlanta Braves, Houston Astros, California Angels | |
| Mike LaCoss | July 18, 1978 | July 2, 1991 | Pitcher | Cincinnati Reds, Houston Astros, Kansas City Royals, San Francisco Giants | |
| Guy Lacy | May 7, 1926 | August 17, 1926 | Second baseman | Cleveland Indians | |
| Kerry Lacy | August 16, 1996 | August 21, 1997 | Pitcher | Boston Red Sox | |
| Lee Lacy | June 30, 1972 | October 3, 1987 | Outfielder | Los Angeles Dodgers, Atlanta Braves, Pittsburgh Pirates, Baltimore Orioles | |
| Hi Ladd | July 12, 1898 | July 18, 1898 | Outfielder | Pittsburgh Pirates, Boston Beaneaters | |
| Pete Ladd | August 17, 1979 | October 3, 1986 | Pitcher | Houston Astros, Milwaukee Brewers, Seattle Mariners | |
| Doyle Lade | September 18, 1946 | September 29, 1950 | Pitcher | Chicago Cubs | |
| Steve Ladew | September 27, 1889 | September 28, 1889 | Utility player | Kansas City Cowboys | |
| Joe Lafata | April 17, 1947 | September 25, 1949 | First baseman | New York Giants | |
| Flip Lafferty | September 15, 1876 | October 2, 1877 | Outfielder | Philadelphia Athletics (1860–76), Louisville Grays | |
| Aaron Laffey | August 7, 2004 | | Pitcher | Cleveland Indians, Seattle Mariners, New York Yankees | |
| Ed Lafitte | April 16, 1909 | August 26, 1915 | Pitcher | Detroit Tigers, Brooklyn Tip-Tops, Buffalo Blues | |
| Pete Laforest | September 2, 2003 | September 27, 2007 | Catcher | Tampa Bay Devil Rays, San Diego Padres, Philadelphia Phillies | |
| Ty LaForest | August 4, 1945 | September 30, 1945 | Third baseman | Boston Red Sox | |
| Roger LaFrancois | May 27, 1982 | October 3, 1982 | Catcher | Boston Red Sox | |
| Mike Laga | September 1, 1982 | October 3, 1990 | First baseman | Detroit Tigers, St. Louis Cardinals, San Francisco Giants | |
| Ed Lagger | June 15, 1934 | August 27, 1934 | Pitcher | Philadelphia Athletics | |
| Lerrin LaGrow | July 28, 1970 | July 14, 1980 | Pitcher | Detroit Tigers, St. Louis Cardinals, Chicago White Sox, Los Angeles Dodgers, Philadelphia Phillies | |
| Bryan LaHair | July 18, 2008 | | First baseman | Seattle Mariners, Chicago Cubs | |
| Joe Lahoud | April 10, 1968 | May 24, 1978 | Outfielder | Boston Red Sox, Milwaukee Brewers, California Angels, Texas Rangers, Kansas City Royals | |
| Jeff Lahti | June 27, 1982 | April 24, 1986 | Pitcher | St. Louis Cardinals | |
| Brandon Laird | July 22, 2011 | | Third baseman | New York Yankees | |
| Gerald Laird | April 30, 2003 | | Catcher | Texas Rangers, Detroit Tigers, St. Louis Cardinals | |
| Dick Lajeskie | September 10, 1946 | September 22, 1946 | Second baseman | New York Giants | |
| Nap Lajoie β | August 12, 1896 | August 26, 1916 | Second baseman | Philadelphia Phillies, Philadelphia Athletics, Cleveland Bronchos/Naps | |
| Eddie Lake | September 26, 1939 | September 30, 1950 | Shortstop | St. Louis Cardinals, Boston Red Sox, Detroit Tigers | |
| Fred Lake | May 7, 1891 | May 28, 1910 | Catcher | Boston Beaneaters, Louisville Colonels, Pittsburgh Pirates, Boston Doves | |
| Joe Lake | April 21, 1908 | August 25, 1913 | Pitcher | New York Highlanders, St. Louis Browns, Detroit Tigers | |
| Steve Lake | April 9, 1983 | September 22, 1993 | Catcher | Chicago Cubs, St. Louis Cardinals, Philadelphia Phillies | |
| Al Lakeman | April 19, 1942 | May 23, 1954 | Catcher | Cincinnati Reds, Philadelphia Phillies, Boston Braves, Detroit Tigers | |
| Tim Laker | August 18, 1992 | June 18, 2006 | Catcher | Montreal Expos, Baltimore Orioles, Tampa Bay Devil Rays, Pittsburgh Pirates, Cleveland Indians | |
| Dan Lally | August 19, 1891 | September 19, 1897 | Outfielder | Pittsburgh Pirates, St. Louis Cardinals | |
| Jack Lamabe | April 17, 1962 | September 22, 1968 | Pitcher | Pittsburgh Pirates, Boston Red Sox, Houston Astros, Chicago White Sox, New York Mets, St. Louis Cardinals, Chicago Cubs | |
| Al LaMacchia | September 27, 1943 | June 29, 1946 | Pitcher | St. Louis Browns, Washington Senators | |
| Frank LaManna | April 16, 1940 | September 19, 1942 | Pitcher | Boston Bees/Braves | |
| Ray Lamanno | September 11, 1941 | October 3, 1948 | Catcher | Cincinnati Reds | |
| Frank Lamanske | April 27, 1935 | May 1, 1935 | Pitcher | Brooklyn Dodgers | |
| Bill Lamar | September 19, 1917 | August 6, 1927 | Outfielder | New York Yankees, Boston Red Sox, Philadelphia Athletics | |
| Wayne LaMaster | April 19, 1937 | August 29, 1938 | Pitcher | Philadelphia Phillies, Brooklyn Dodgers | |
| David Lamb | April 12, 1999 | September 29, 2002 | Shortstop | Tampa Bay Devil Rays, New York Mets, Minnesota Twins | |
| John Lamb | August 12, 1970 | September 21, 1973 | Pitcher | September 21, 1973 | |
| Lyman Lamb | September 14, 1920 | September 24, 1921 | Third baseman | St. Louis Browns | |
| Mike Lamb | April 23, 2000 | | Third baseman | Texas Rangers, Houston Astros, Minnesota Twins, Milwaukee Brewers, Florida Marlins | |
| Ray Lamb | August 1, 1969 | September 28, 1973 | Pitcher | Los Angeles Dodgers, Cleveland Indians | |
| Chris Lambert | August 26, 2008 | | Pitcher | Detroit Tigers, Baltimore Orioles | |
| Clayton Lambert | April 20, 1946 | April 30, 1947 | Pitcher | Cincinnati Reds | |
| Gene Lambert | September 14, 1941 | April 26, 1942 | Pitcher | Philadelphia Phillies | |
| Otis Lambeth | July 16, 1916 | April 24, 1918 | Pitcher | Cleveland Indians | |
| Pete Lamer | September 10, 1902 | August 20, 1907 | Catcher | Chicago Orphans, Cincinnati Reds | |
| Fred Lamlein | September 18, 1912 | September 21, 1915 | Pitcher | Chicago White Sox, St. Louis Cardinals | |
| Gene Lamont | September 2, 1970 | May 24, 1975 | Catcher | Detroit Tigers | |
| Bobby LaMotte | September 1, 1920 | July 11, 1926 | Shortstop | Washington Senators, St. Louis Browns | |
| Dennis Lamp | August 21, 1977 | June 6, 1992 | Pitcher | Chicago Cubs, Chicago White Sox, Toronto Blue Jays, Oakland Athletics, Boston Red Sox, Pittsburgh Pirates | |
| Keith Lampard | September 15, 1969 | October 1, 1970 | Outfielder | Houston Astros | |
| Henry Lampe | May 14, 1894 | August 2, 1895 | Pitcher | Boston Beaneaters, Philadelphia Phillies | |
| Tom Lampkin | September 10, 1988 | September 28, 2002 | Catcher | Cleveland Indians, San Diego Padres, Milwaukee Brewers, San Francisco Giants, St. Louis Cardinals, Seattle Mariners | |
| Dick Lanahan | September 15, 1935 | May 12, 1941 | Pitcher | Washington Senators, Pittsburgh Pirates | |
| Les Lancaster | April 7, 1987 | October 3, 1993 | Pitcher | Chicago Cubs, Detroit Tigers, St. Louis Cardinals | |
| Gary Lance | September 28, 1977 | September 28, 1977 | Pitcher | Kansas City Royals | |
| Rick Lancellotti | August 27, 1982 | August 18, 1990 | First baseman | San Diego Padres, San Francisco Giants, Boston Red Sox | |
| Doc Land | October 6, 1929 | October 6, 1929 | Outfielder | Washington Senators | |
| Grover Land | September 2, 1908 | September 25, 1915 | Catcher | Cleveland Naps, Brooklyn Tip-Tops | |
| Ken Landenberger | September 20, 1952 | September 28, 1952 | First baseman | Chicago White Sox | |
| Rafael Landestoy | August 27, 1977 | September 30, 1984 | Second baseman | Los Angeles Dodgers, Houston Astros, Cincinnati Reds | |
| Bill Landis | September 28, 1963 | September 30, 1969 | Pitcher | Kansas City Athletics, Boston Red Sox | |
| Doc Landis | May 2, 1882 | September 30, 1882 | Pitcher | Philadelphia Athletics (AA), Baltimore Orioles (AA) | |
| Jim Landis | April 16, 1957 | August 27, 1967 | Outfielder | Chicago White Sox, Kansas City Athletics, Cleveland Indians, Houston Astros, Detroit Tigers, Boston Red Sox | |
| Ken Landreaux | September 11, 1977 | October 4, 1987 | Outfielder | California Angels, Minnesota Twins, Los Angeles Dodgers | |
| Larry Landreth | September 16, 1976 | September 30, 1977 | Pitcher | Montreal Expos | |
| Hobie Landrith | July 30, 1950 | August 7, 1963 | Catcher | Cincinnati Reds/Redlegs, Chicago Cubs, St. Louis Cardinals, San Francisco Giants, New York Mets, Baltimore Orioles, Washington Senators | |
| Bill Landrum | August 31, 1986 | June 3, 1993 | Pitcher | Cincinnati Reds, Chicago Cubs, Pittsburgh Pirates, Montreal Expos | |
| Ced Landrum | May 28, 1991 | September 25, 1993 | Outfielder | Chicago Cubs, New York Mets | |
| Don Landrum | September 28, 1957 | July 21, 1966 | Outfielder | Philadelphia Phillies, St. Louis Cardinals, Chicago Cubs, San Francisco Giants | |
| Jesse Landrum | April 26, 1938 | May 11, 1938 | Second baseman | Chicago White Sox | |
| Joe Landrum | July 13, 1950 | September 11, 1952 | Pitcher | Brooklyn Dodgers | |
| Tito Landrum | July 23, 1980 | May 9, 1988 | Outfielder | St. Louis Cardinals, Baltimore Orioles, Los Angeles Dodgers | |
| Chappy Lane | May 16, 1882 | September 9, 1884 | First baseman | Pittsburgh Alleghenys, Toledo Blue Stockings | |
| Dick Lane | June 20, 1949 | July 8, 1949 | Outfielder | Chicago White Sox | |
| Hunter Lane | May 13, 1924 | July 26, 1924 | Third baseman | Boston Braves | |
| Jason Lane | May 10, 2002 | October 1, 2007 | Outfielder | Houston Astros, San Diego Padres | |
| Jerry Lane | July 7, 1953 | May 8, 1955 | Pitcher | Washington Senators, Cincinnati Redlegs | |
| Marvin Lane | September 4, 1971 | October 3, 1976 | Outfielder | Detroit Tigers | |
| Sam Lanford | August 19, 1907 | September 14, 1907 | Pitcher | Washington Senators | |
| Walt Lanfranconi | September 12, 1941 | September 4, 1947 | Pitcher | Chicago Cubs, Boston Braves | |
| Chip Lang | September 8, 1975 | October 3, 1976 | Pitcher | Montreal Expos | |
| Don Lang | July 4, 1938 | October 1, 1948 | Third baseman | Cincinnati Reds, St. Louis Cardinals | |
| Marty Lang | July 4, 1930 | July 14, 1930 | Pitcher | Pittsburgh Pirates | |
| Bill Lange | April 27, 1893 | October 15, 1899 | Outfielder | Chicago Colts/Orphans | |
| Dick Lange | September 9, 1972 | September 23, 1975 | Pitcher | California Angels | |
| Erv Lange | April 19, 1914 | October 6, 1914 | Pitcher | Chicago Chi-Feds | |
| Frank Lange | May 16, 1910 | July 20, 1913 | Pitcher | Chicago White Sox | |
| Ryan Langerhans | April 28, 2002 | | Outfielder | Atlanta Braves, Oakland Athletics, Washington Nationals, Seattle Mariners | |
| Rick Langford | June 13, 1976 | July 13, 1986 | Pitcher | Pittsburgh Pirates | |
| Sam Langford | April 13, 1926 | September 21, 1928 | Outfielder | Boston Red Sox, Cleveland Indians | |
| Bob Langsford | June 18, 1899 | June 18, 1899 | Shortstop | Louisville Colonels | |
| Mark Langston | April 7, 1984 | September 24, 1999 | Pitcher | Seattle Mariners, Montreal Expos, California/Anaheim Angels, San Diego Padres, Cleveland Indians | |
| Hal Lanier | June 18, 1964 | September 30, 1973 | Utility infielder | San Francisco Giants, New York Yankees | |
| Max Lanier | April 20, 1938 | July 5, 1953 | Pitcher | St. Louis Cardinals, New York Giants, St. Louis Browns | |
| Rimp Lanier | September 11, 1971 | September 26, 1971 | Pinch hitter | Pittsburgh Pirates | |
| Frank Lankford | March 31, 1998 | May 13, 1998 | Pitcher | Los Angeles Dodgers | |
| Ray Lankford | August 21, 1990 | October 3, 2004 | Outfielder | St. Louis Cardinals, San Diego Padres | |
| John Lannan | July 26, 2007 | | Pitcher | Montreal Expos | |
| Johnny Lanning | April 17, 1936 | May 12, 1947 | Pitcher | Boston Braves, Pittsburgh Pirates | |
| Red Lanning | June 20, 1916 | August 5, 1916 | Utility player | Philadelphia Athletics | |
| Tom Lanning | September 14, 1938 | October 2, 1938 | Pitcher | Philadelphia Phillies | |
| Carney Lansford | April 8, 1978 | October 4, 1992 | Third baseman | California Angels, Boston Red Sox, Oakland Athletics | |
| Jody Lansford | July 31, 1982 | October 2, 1983 | First baseman | San Diego Padres | |
| Gene Lansing | April 27, 1922 | July 17, 1922 | Pitcher | Boston Braves | |
| Mike Lansing | April 7, 1993 | September 8, 2001 | Second baseman | Montreal Expos, Colorado Rockies, Boston Red Sox | |
| Paul LaPalme | May 28, 1951 | August 28, 1957 | Pitcher | Pittsburgh Pirates, St. Louis Cardinals, Cincinnati Reds, Chicago White Sox | |
| Pete Lapan | September 16, 1922 | May 3, 1923 | Catcher | Washington Senators | |
| Andy Lapihuska | September 12, 1942 | May 5, 1943 | Pitcher | Philadelphia Phillies | |
| Dave LaPoint | September 10, 1980 | April 20, 1991 | Pitcher | Milwaukee Brewers, St. Louis Cardinals, San Francisco Giants, Detroit Tigers, San Diego Padres, Chicago White Sox, Pittsburgh Pirates, New York Yankees, Philadelphia Phillies | |
| Ralph LaPointe | April 15, 1947 | September 29, 1948 | Shortstop | Philadelphia Phillies, St. Louis Cardinals | |
| Matt LaPorta | May 3, 2009 | | First baseman | Cleveland Indians | |
| Frank LaPorte | September 29, 1905 | October 3, 1915 | Second baseman | New York Highlanders, Boston Red Sox, St. Louis Browns, Washington Senators, Indianapolis Hoosiers (FL)/Newark Peppers | |
| Jack Lapp | September 11, 1908 | October 1, 1916 | Catcher | Philadelphia Athletics, Chicago White Sox | |
| Juan Lara | September 8, 2006 | September 6, 2007 | Pitcher | Cleveland Indians | |
| Yovanny Lara | June 28, 2000 | July 14, 2000 | Pitcher | Montreal Expos | |
| Jeff Larish | May 30, 2008 | | First baseman | Detroit Tigers, Oakland Athletics | |
| Norm Larker | April 15, 1958 | September 28, 1963 | First baseman | Los Angeles Dodgers, Houston Colt .45s, Milwaukee Braves, San Francisco Giants | |
| Andy Larkin | September 29, 1996 | September 10, 2000 | Pitcher | Florida Marlins, Cincinnati Reds, Kansas City Royals | |
| Barry Larkin | August 13, 1986 | October 3, 2004 | Shortstop | Cincinnati Reds | |
| Ed Larkin | October 2, 1909 | October 2, 1909 | Catcher | Philadelphia Athletics | |
| Gene Larkin | May 21, 1987 | August 11, 1993 | First baseman | Minnesota Twins | |
| Henry Larkin | May 1, 1884 | August 4, 1893 | First baseman | Philadelphia Athletics (AA), Cleveland Infants, Philadelphia Athletics (1890–91), Washington Senators (NL) | |
| Pat Larkin | July 16, 1983 | August 1, 1983 | Pitcher | San Francisco Giants | |
| Stephen Larkin | September 27, 1998 | September 27, 1998 | First baseman | Cincinnati Reds | |
| Steve Larkin | May 6, 1934 | May 9, 1934 | Pitcher | Detroit Tigers | |
| Terry Larkin | May 20, 1876 | October 13, 1884 | Pitcher | New York Mutuals, Brooklyn Hartfords, Chicago White Stockings, Troy Trojans | |
| Patrick Larkins | May 29, 1884 | July 16, 1884 | Third baseman | Washington Nationals (UA) | |
| Bob Larmore | May 14, 1918 | June 22, 1918 | Shortstop | St. Louis Cardinals | |
| Greg LaRocca | September 7, 2000 | September 23, 2003 | Third baseman | San Diego Padres, Cleveland Indians | |
| Adam LaRoche | April 7, 2004 | | First baseman | Atlanta Braves, Pittsburgh Pirates, Boston Red Sox, Arizona Diamondbacks, Washington Nationals | |
| Andy LaRoche | May 6, 2007 | | Third baseman | Los Angeles Dodgers, Pittsburgh Pirates, Oakland Athletics | |
| Dave LaRoche | May 11, 1970 | August 23, 1983 | Pitcher | California Angels, Minnesota Twins, Chicago Cubs, Cleveland Indians, New York Yankees | |
| Sam LaRocque | July 30, 1888 | May 31, 1891 | Second baseman | Detroit Wolverines, Pittsburgh Alleghenys/Pirates, Louisville Colonels | |
| John LaRose | September 20, 1978 | September 20, 1978 | Pitcher | Boston Red Sox | |
| Vic LaRose | September 13, 1968 | September 25, 1968 | Utility infielder | Chicago Cubs | |
| Harry LaRoss | June 24, 1914 | July 23, 1914 | Outfielder | Cincinnati Reds | |
| Don Larsen | April 18, 1953 | July 7, 1967 | Pitcher | St. Louis Browns/Baltimore Orioles, New York Yankees, Kansas City Athletics, Chicago White Sox, San Francisco Giants, Houston Colt .45s/Astros, Chicago Cubs | |
| Swede Larsen | June 17, 1936 | September 27, 1936 | Second baseman | Boston Bees | |
| Brandon Larson | May 4, 2001 | July 17, 2004 | Third baseman | Cincinnati Reds | |
| Dan Larson | July 18, 1976 | June 1, 1982 | Pitcher | Houston Astros, Philadelphia Phillies, Chicago Cubs | |
| Jason LaRue | June 15, 1999 | | Catcher | Cincinnati Reds, Kansas City Royals, St. Louis Cardinals | |
| Tony La Russa | May 10, 1963 | April 6, 1973 | Second baseman | Kansas City/Oakland Athletics, Atlanta Braves, Chicago Cubs | |
| Al Lary | September 6, 1954 | September 15, 1962 | Pitcher | Chicago Cubs | |
| Frank Lary | September 14, 1954 | September 21, 1965 | Pitcher | Detroit Tigers, New York Mets, Milwaukee Braves, Chicago White Sox | |
| Lyn Lary | May 11, 1929 | August 7, 1940 | Shortstop | New York Yankees, Boston Red Sox, Washington Senators, St. Louis Browns, Cleveland Indians, Brooklyn Dodgers, St. Louis Cardinals | |
| Fred Lasher | April 12, 1963 | July 1, 1971 | Pitcher | Minnesota Twins, Detroit Tigers, Cleveland Indians, California Angels | |
| Bill Laskey | April 23, 1982 | August 13, 1988 | Pitcher | San Francisco Giants, Montreal Expos, Cleveland Indians | |
| Bill Lasley | September 19, 1924 | September 23, 1924 | Pitcher | St. Louis Browns | |
| Tommy Lasorda β | August 5, 1954 | July 8, 1956 | Pitcher | Brooklyn Dodgers, Kansas City Athletics | |
| Don Lassetter | September 21, 1957 | September 29, 1957 | Outfielder | St. Louis Cardinals | |
| Arlie Latham | July 5, 1880 | September 30, 1909 | Third baseman | Buffalo Bisons (NL), St. Louis Browns, Chicago Pirates, Cincinnati Reds, St. Louis Browns (NL), Washington Senators (NL), New York Giants | |
| Bill Latham | April 15, 1985 | October 1, 1986 | Pitcher | New York Mets, Minnesota Twins | |
| Chris Latham | April 12, 1997 | April 18, 2003 | Outfielder | Minnesota Twins, Toronto Blue Jays, New York Yankees | |
| Juice Latham | April 19, 1875 | October 11, 1884 | First baseman | Boston Red Stockings, New Haven Elm Citys, Louisville Grays, Philadelphia Athletics (AA), Louisville Eclipse | |
| Chick Lathers | May 1, 1910 | October 8, 1911 | Utility infielder | Detroit Tigers | |
| Bill Lathrop | July 29, 1913 | October 3, 1914 | Pitcher | Chicago White Sox | |
| Tacks Latimer | October 1, 1898 | September 8, 1902 | Catcher | New York Giants, Louisville Colonels, Pittsburgh Pirates, Baltimore Orioles, Brooklyn Superbas | |
| Barry Latman | September 10, 1957 | August 12, 1967 | Pitcher | Chicago White Sox, Cleveland Indians, Los Angeles/California Angels, Houston Astros | |
| Mat Latos | July 19, 2009 | | Pitcher | San Diego Padres | |
| Bill Lattimore | April 17, 1908 | May 28, 1908 | Pitcher | Cleveland Naps | |
| Charley Lau | September 12, 1956 | September 29, 1967 | Catcher | Detroit Tigers, Milwaukee Braves, Baltimore Orioles, Kansas City Athletics, Atlanta Braves | |
| Billy Lauder | June 25, 1898 | September 26, 1903 | Third baseman | Philadelphia Phillies, Philadelphia Athletics, New York Giants | |
| Tim Laudner | August 28, 1981 | September 3, 1989 | Catcher | Minnesota Twins | |
| Chuck Lauer | July 17, 1884 | April 28, 1890 | Outfielder | Pittsburgh Alleghenys, Chicago Colts | |
| Ben Laughlin | April 28, 1873 | August 7, 1873 | Second baseman | Elizabeth Resolutes | |
| Bill Lauterborn | September 20, 1904 | August 28, 1905 | Second baseman | Boston Beaneaters | |
| George Lauzerique | September 17, 1967 | May 28, 1970 | Pitcher | Kansas City/Oakland Athletics, Milwaukee Brewers | |
| Cookie Lavagetto | April 17, 1934 | September 28, 1947 | Third baseman | Pittsburgh Pirates, Brooklyn Dodgers | |
| Mike LaValliere | September 9, 1984 | September 22, 1995 | Catcher | Philadelphia Phillies, St. Louis Cardinals, Pittsburgh Pirates, Chicago White Sox | |
| Doc Lavan | June 22, 1913 | May 4, 1924 | Shortstop | St. Louis Cardinals, Philadelphia Athletics, Washington Senators, St. Louis Cardinals | |
| Ryan Lavarnway | August 18, 2011 | | Catcher | Boston Red Sox | |
| Gary Lavelle | September 10, 1974 | October 3, 1987 | Pitcher | San Francisco Giants, Toronto Blue Jays, Oakland Athletics | |
| Jimmy Lavender | April 23, 1912 | October 3, 1917 | Pitcher | Chicago Cubs, Philadelphia Phillies | |
| Art LaVigne | April 24, 1914 | October 5, 1914 | Catcher | Buffalo Buffeds | |
| Johnny Lavin | September 10, 1884 | October 15, 1884 | Outfielder | St. Louis Browns (AA) | |
| Ron Law | June 29, 1969 | September 30, 1969 | Pitcher | Cleveland Indians | |
| Rudy Law | September 12, 1978 | October 4, 1986 | Outfielder | Los Angeles Dodgers, Chicago White Sox, Kansas City Royals | |
| Vance Law | June 1, 1980 | October 6, 1991 | Third baseman | Pittsburgh Pirates, Chicago White Sox, Montreal Expos, Chicago Cubs, Oakland Athletics | |
| Vern Law | June 11, 1950 | August 20, 1967 | Pitcher | Pittsburgh Pirates | |
| Garland Lawing | May 29, 1946 | July 20, 1946 | Outfielder | Cincinnati Reds, New York Giants | |
| Tom Lawless | July 15, 1982 | July 4, 1990 | Utility infielder | Cincinnati Reds, Montreal Expos, St. Louis Cardinals, Toronto Blue Jays | |
| Mike Lawlor | May 27, 1880 | July 23, 1884 | Catcher | Troy Trojans, Washington Nationals (UA) | |
| Bill Lawrence | April 13, 1932 | July 21, 1932 | Outfielder | Detroit Tigers | |
| Bob Lawrence | July 19, 1924 | July 19, 1924 | Pitcher | Chicago White Sox | |
| Brian Lawrence | April 15, 2001 | September 17, 2007 | Pitcher | San Diego Padres, New York Mets | |
| Brooks Lawrence | June 24, 1954 | May 1, 1960 | Pitcher | St. Louis Cardinals, Cincinnati Redlegs/Reds | |
| Jim Lawrence | May 30, 1963 | June 1, 1963 | Catcher | Cleveland Indians | |
| Joe Lawrence | April 8, 2002 | July 22, 2002 | Second baseman | Toronto Blue Jays | |
| Sean Lawrence | August 25, 1998 | September 22, 1998 | Pitcher | Pittsburgh Pirates | |
| Brett Lawrie | August 5, 2011 | | Third baseman | Toronto Blue Jays | |
| Otis Lawry | June 28, 1916 | September 29, 1917 | Second baseman | Philadelphia Athletics | |
| Alfred Lawson | May 13, 1890 | June 2, 1890 | Pitcher | Boston Beaneaters, Pittsburgh Alleghenys | |
| Bob Lawson | May 7, 1901 | June 10, 1902 | Pitcher | Boston Beaneaters, Baltimore Orioles (1901–02) | |
| Roxie Lawson | August 3, 1930 | September 28, 1940 | Pitcher | Cleveland Indians, Detroit Tigers, St. Louis Browns | |
| Steve Lawson | August 3, 1972 | October 4, 1972 | Pitcher | Texas Rangers | |
| Marcus Lawton | August 11, 1989 | October 1, 1989 | Outfielder | New York Yankees | |
| Matt Lawton | September 5, 1995 | May 16, 2006 | Outfielder | Minnesota Twins, New York Mets, Cleveland Indians, Pittsburgh Pirates, Chicago Cubs, New York Yankees, Seattle Mariners | |
| Bill Laxton | September 15, 1970 | September 19, 1977 | Pitcher | Philadelphia Phillies, San Diego Padres, Detroit Tigers, Seattle Mariners, Cleveland Indians | |
| Brett Laxton | June 21, 1999 | July 13, 2000 | Pitcher | Oakland Athletics, Kansas City Royals | |
| Tim Layana | April 9, 1990 | July 26, 1993 | Pitcher | Cincinnati Reds, San Francisco Giants | |
| Gene Layden | July 29, 1915 | September 25, 1915 | Outfielder | New York Yankees | |
| Pete Layden | April 20, 1948 | July 15, 1948 | Outfielder | St. Louis Browns | |
| Herman Layne | April 16, 1927 | May 31, 1927 | Outfielder | Pittsburgh Pirates | |
| Hillis Layne | September 16, 1941 | September 21, 1945 | Third baseman | Washington Senators | |
| Les Layton | April 24, 1948 | October 3, 1948 | Outfielder | New York Giants | |
| Danny Lazar | June 21, 1968 | October 2, 1969 | Pitcher | Chicago White Sox | |
| Johnny Lazor | April 22, 1943 | September 29, 1946 | Outfielder | Boston Red Sox | |
| Jack Lazorko | June 4, 1984 | September 27, 1988 | Pitcher | Milwaukee Brewers, Seattle Mariners, Detroit Tigers, California Angels | |
| Tony Lazzeri β | April 13, 1926 | June 7, 1939 | Second baseman | New York Yankees, Chicago Cubs, Brooklyn Dodgers, New York Giants | |
| Charlie Lea | June 12, 1980 | October 1, 1988 | Pitcher | Montreal Expos, Minnesota Twins | |
| Brent Leach | May 6, 2009 | | Pitcher | Los Angeles Dodgers | |
| Freddy Leach | May 24, 1923 | September 20, 1932 | Outfielder | Philadelphia Phillies, New York Giants, Boston Braves | |
| Jalal Leach | September 5, 2001 | October 6, 2001 | Outfielder | San Francisco Giants | |
| Rick Leach | April 30, 1981 | August 5, 1990 | Utility player | Detroit Tigers, Toronto Blue Jays, Texas Rangers, San Francisco Giants | |
| Terry Leach | August 12, 1981 | June 23, 1993 | Pitcher | New York Mets, Kansas City Royals, Minnesota Twins, Chicago White Sox | |
| Tommy Leach | September 28, 1898 | September 2, 1918 | Outfielder | Louisville Colonels, Pittsburgh Pirates, Chicago Cubs, Cincinnati Reds | |
| Brandon League | September 21, 2004 | | Pitcher | Toronto Blue Jays, Seattle Mariners | |
| Dan Leahy | September 2, 1896 | September 2, 1896 | Shortstop | Philadelphia Phillies | |
| Tom Leahy | May 18, 1897 | October 7, 1905 | Catcher | Pittsburgh Pirates, Washington Senators (NL), Milwaukee Brewers (1901), Philadelphia Athletics, St. Louis Cardinals | |
| Mike Leake | April 11, 2010 | | Pitcher | Cincinnati Reds | |
| Luis Leal | May 25, 1980 | June 29, 1985 | Pitcher | Toronto Blue Jays | |
| Fred Lear | June 7, 1915 | June 22, 1920 | Third baseman | Philadelphia Athletics, Chicago Cubs, New York Giants | |
| King Lear | May 2, 1914 | September 29, 1915 | Pitcher | Cincinnati Reds | |
| Bill Leard | July 21, 1917 | July 25, 1917 | Second baseman | Brooklyn Robins | |
| Frank Leary | April 30, 1907 | May 5, 1907 | Pitcher | Cincinnati Reds | |
| Jack Leary | August 21, 1880 | July 5, 1884 | Utility player | Boston Red Caps, Detroit Wolverines, Pittsburgh Alleghenys, Baltimore Orioles (AA), Louisville Eclipse, Altoona Mountain City, Chicago Browns/Pittsburgh Stogies | |
| John Leary | April 14, 1914 | September 27, 1915 | First baseman | St. Louis Browns | |
| Tim Leary | April 12, 1981 | August 9, 1994 | Pitcher | New York Mets, Milwaukee Brewers, Los Angeles Dodgers, Cincinnati Reds, New York Yankees, Seattle Mariners, Texas Rangers | |
| Hal Leathers | September 13, 1920 | October 2, 1920 | Shortstop | Chicago Cubs | |
| Emil Leber | September 2, 1905 | September 3, 1905 | Third baseman | Cleveland Naps | |
| Wade LeBlanc | September 3, 2008 | | Pitcher | San Diego Padres | |
| Bevo LeBourveau | September 9, 1919 | October 5, 1929 | Outfielder | Philadelphia Phillies, Philadelphia Athletics | |
| George LeClair | June 5, 1914 | October 2, 1915 | Pitcher | Pittsburgh Rebels, Buffalo Blues, Baltimore Terrapins | |
| Matthew LeCroy | April 3, 2000 | September 30, 2007 | Catcher | Minnesota Twins, Washington Nationals | |
| Sam LeCure | May 28, 2010 | | Pitcher | Cincinnati Reds | |
| Razor Ledbetter | April 16, 1915 | April 16, 1915 | Pitcher | Detroit Tigers | |
| Ricky Ledée | June 14, 1998 | July 7, 2007 | Outfielder | New York Yankees, Cleveland Indians, Texas Rangers, Philadelphia Phillies, San Francisco Giants, Los Angeles Dodgers, New York Mets | |
| Aaron Ledesma | July 2, 1995 | June 10, 2000 | Shortstop | New York Mets, Baltimore Orioles, Tampa Bay Devil Rays, Colorado Rockies | |
| Wil Ledezma | April 2, 2003 | | Pitcher | Detroit Tigers, Atlanta Braves, San Diego Padres, Arizona Diamondbacks, Washington Nationals, Pittsburgh Pirates, Toronto Blue Jays | |
| Mike Ledwith | August 19, 1874 | August 19, 1874 | Catcher | Brooklyn Atlantics | |
| Bill Lee (RHP) | April 29, 1934 | June 29, 1947 | Pitcher | Chicago Cubs, Philadelphia Phillies, Boston Braves | |
| Bill Lee (LHP) | June 25, 1969 | May 7, 1982 | Pitcher | Boston Red Sox, Montreal Expos | |
| Billy Lee | April 15, 1915 | September 30, 1916 | Outfielder | St. Louis Browns | |
| Bob Lee | April 15, 1964 | August 25, 1968 | Pitcher | Los Angeles/California Angels, Los Angeles Dodgers, Cincinnati Reds | |
| Carlos Lee | May 7, 1999 | | Outfielder | Chicago White Sox, Milwaukee Brewers, Texas Rangers, Houston Astros | |
| Cliff Lee (OF) | May 15, 1919 | September 8, 1926 | Outfielder | Pittsburgh Pirates, Philadelphia Phillies, Cincinnati Reds, Cleveland Indians | |
| Cliff Lee (P) | September 15, 2002 | | Pitcher | Cleveland Indians, Philadelphia Phillies, Seattle Mariners, Texas Rangers | |
| Corey Lee | August 24, 1999 | August 24, 1999 | Pitcher | Texas Rangers | |
| David Lee | May 22, 1999 | April 23, 2004 | Pitcher | Colorado Rockies, San Diego Padres, Cleveland Indians | |
| Derek Lee | June 27, 1993 | July 22, 1993 | Outfielder | Minnesota Twins | |
| Derrek Lee | April 28, 1997 | | First baseman | San Diego Padres, Florida Marlins, Chicago Cubs, Atlanta Braves, Baltimore Orioles, Pittsburgh Pirates | |
| Don Lee | April 23, 1957 | August 21, 1966 | Pitcher | Detroit Tigers, Washington Senators/Minnesota Twins, Los Angeles/California Angels, Houston Astros, Chicago Cubs | |
| Dud Lee | October 3, 1920 | April 14, 1926 | Shortstop | St. Louis Browns, Boston Red Sox | |
| Hal Lee | April 19, 1930 | September 27, 1936 | Outfielder | Brooklyn Robins, Philadelphia Phillies, Boston Braves | |
| Leonidas Lee | July 17, 1877 | August 25, 1877 | Outfielder | St. Louis Brown Stockings | |
| Leron Lee | September 5, 1969 | October 3, 1976 | Outfielder | St. Louis Cardinals, San Diego Padres, Cleveland Indians, Los Angeles Dodgers | |
| Manuel Lee | April 10, 1985 | April 26, 1995 | Shortstop | Toronto Blue Jays, Texas Rangers, St. Louis Cardinals | |
| Mark Lee (RHP) | April 23, 1978 | October 4, 1981 | Pitcher | San Diego Padres, Pittsburgh Pirates | |
| Mark Lee (LHP) | September 8, 1988 | September 24, 1995 | Pitcher | Kansas City Royals, Milwaukee Brewers, Baltimore Orioles | |
| Mike Lee | May 6, 1960 | September 22, 1963 | Pitcher | Cleveland Indians, Los Angeles Angels | |
| Roy Lee | September 23, 1945 | September 29, 1945 | Pitcher | New York Giants | |
| Lee Sang-Hoon | June 29, 2000 | October 1, 2000 | Pitcher | Boston Red Sox | |
| Terry Lee | September 3, 1990 | August 21, 1991 | First baseman | Cincinnati Reds | |
| Thornton Lee | September 19, 1933 | June 18, 1948 | Pitcher | Cleveland Indians, Chicago White Sox, New York Giants | |
| Tom Lee | June 14, 1884 | September 16, 1884 | Pitcher | Chicago White Stockings, Baltimore Monumentals | |
| Travis Lee | March 31, 1998 | September 1, 2006 | First baseman | Arizona Diamondbacks, Philadelphia Phillies, Tampa Bay Devil Rays, New York Yankees | |
| Watty Lee | April 30, 1901 | May 26, 1904 | Outfielder | Washington Senators, Pittsburgh Pirates | |
| Gene Leek | April 22, 1959 | September 30, 1962 | Third baseman | Cleveland Indians, Los Angeles Angels | |
| Dave Leeper | September 10, 1984 | October 6, 1985 | Outfielder | Kansas City Royals | |
| George Lees | May 7, 1921 | September 24, 1921 | Catcher | Chicago White Sox | |
| Sam Leever | May 26, 1898 | September 26, 1910 | Pitcher | Pittsburgh Pirates | |
| Bill Lefebvre | June 10, 1938 | September 29, 1944 | Pitcher | Boston Red Sox, Washington Senators | |
| Jim Lefebvre | April 12, 1965 | September 19, 1972 | Second baseman | Los Angeles Dodgers | |
| Joe Lefebvre | May 22, 1980 | May 13, 1986 | Outfielder | New York Yankees, San Diego Padres, Philadelphia Phillies | |
| Al Lefevre | June 28, 1920 | October 3, 1920 | Shortstop | New York Giants | |
| Craig Lefferts | April 7, 1983 | July 3, 1994 | Pitcher | Chicago Cubs, San Diego Padres, San Francisco Giants, Baltimore Orioles, Texas Rangers, California Angels | |
| Wade Lefler | April 16, 1924 | September 30, 1924 | Outfielder | Boston Braves, Washington Senators | |
| Ron LeFlore | August 1, 1974 | September 3, 1982 | Outfielder | Detroit Tigers, Montreal Expos, Chicago White Sox | |
| Phil Leftwich | July 29, 1993 | May 6, 1996 | Pitcher | California Angels | |
| Lou Legett | May 8, 1929 | May 4, 1935 | Catcher | Boston Braves, Boston Red Sox | |
| Greg Legg | April 18, 1986 | June 15, 1987 | Second baseman | Philadelphia Phillies | |
| James Lehan | April 26, 1884 | April 29, 1884 | Shortstop | Washington Nationals (UA) | |
| Mike Lehane | April 17, 1890 | October 4, 1891 | First baseman | Columbus Solons | |
| Regis Leheny | May 21, 1932 | May 22, 1932 | Pitcher | Boston Red Sox | |
| Jim Lehew | September 13, 1961 | May 6, 1962 | Pitcher | Baltimore Orioles | |
| Ken Lehman | September 5, 1952 | September 30, 1961 | Pitcher | Brooklyn Dodgers, Baltimore Orioles, Philadelphia Phillies | |
| Paul Lehner | September 10, 1946 | June 30, 1952 | Outfielder | St. Louis Browns, Philadelphia Athletics, Chicago White Sox, Cleveland Indians, Boston Red Sox | |
| Clarence Lehr | May 18, 1911 | October 9, 1911 | Utility player | Philadelphia Phillies | |
| Justin Lehr | June 20, 2004 | | Pitcher | Oakland Athletics, Milwaukee Brewers, Cincinnati Reds | |
| Norm Lehr | May 20, 1926 | July 15, 1926 | Pitcher | Cleveland Indians | |
| Hank Leiber | April 16, 1933 | September 25, 1942 | Outfielder | New York Giants, Chicago Cubs | |
| Nemo Leibold | April 12, 1913 | October 2, 1925 | Outfielder | Cleveland Indians, Chicago White Sox, Boston Red Sox, Washington Senators | |
| Charlie Leibrandt | September 17, 1979 | September 21, 1993 | Pitcher | Cincinnati Reds, Kansas City Royals, Atlanta Braves, Texas Rangers | |
| Jon Leicester | June 9, 2004 | September 28, 2007 | Pitcher | Chicago Cubs, Baltimore Orioles | |
| Elmer Leifer | September 7, 1921 | September 26, 1921 | Utility player | Chicago White Sox | |
| Lefty Leifield | September 3, 1905 | September 24, 1920 | Pitcher | Pittsburgh Pirates, Chicago Cubs, St. Louis Browns | |
| John Leighton | July 12, 1890 | July 20, 1890 | Outfielder | Syracuse Stars (AA) | |
| Bill Leinhauser | May 18, 1912 | May 18, 1912 | Outfielder | Detroit Tigers | |
| Ed Leip | September 16, 1939 | April 30, 1942 | Second baseman | Washington Senators, Pittsburgh | |
| Dave Leiper | September 2, 1984 | September 22, 1996 | Pitcher | Oakland Athletics, San Diego Padres, Montreal Expos, Philadelphia Phillies | |
| Jack Leiper | September 4, 1891 | October 4, 1891 | Pitcher | Columbus Solons | |
| John Leister | May 28, 1987 | April 16, 1990 | Pitcher | Boston Red Sox | |
| Al Leiter | September 15, 1987 | October 2, 2005 | Pitcher | New York Yankees, Toronto Blue Jays, Florida Marlins, New York Mets | |
| Mark Leiter | July 24, 1990 | October 7, 2001 | Pitcher | New York Yankees, Detroit Tigers, California Angels, San Francisco Giants, Montreal Expos, Philadelphia Phillies, Seattle Mariners, Milwaukee Brewers | |
| Bill Leith | September 25, 1899 | September 25, 1899 | Pitcher | Washington Senators (NL) | |
| Doc Leitner | August 10, 1887 | September 17, 1887 | Pitcher | Indianapolis Hoosiers (NL) | |
| Dummy Leitner | June 29, 1901 | August 25, 1902 | Pitcher | Philadelphia Athletics, New York Giants, Cleveland Bronchos, Chicago White Sox | |
| Scott Leius | September 3, 1990 | July 3, 1999 | Third baseman | Minnesota Twins, Cleveland Indians, Kansas City Royals | |
| Frank Leja | May 1, 1954 | April 29, 1962 | First baseman | New York Yankees, Los Angeles Angels | |
| Larry LeJeune | May 10, 1911 | May 3, 1915 | Outfielder | Brooklyn Dodgers, Pittsburgh Pirates | |
| Don LeJohn | June 30, 1965 | October 3, 1965 | Third baseman | Los Angeles Dodgers | |
| Bill Lelivelt | July 19, 1909 | May 6, 1910 | Pitcher | Detroit Tigers | |
| Jack Lelivelt | June 24, 1909 | June 13, 1914 | Outfielder | Washington Senators, New York Highlanders/Yankees, Cleveland Naps | |
| DJ LeMahieu | May 30, 2011 | | Infielder | Chicago Cubs | |
| Dave Lemanczyk | April 15, 1973 | September 27, 1980 | Pitcher | Detroit Tigers, Toronto Blue Jays, California Angels | |
| Denny Lemaster | July 15, 1962 | June 21, 1972 | Pitcher | Milwaukee/Atlanta Braves, Houston Astros, Montreal Expos | |
| Johnnie LeMaster | September 2, 1975 | July 28, 1987 | Shortstop | San Francisco Giants, Cleveland Indians, Pittsburgh Pirates, Oakland Athletics | |
| Dick LeMay | June 13, 1961 | July 28, 1963 | Pitcher | San Francisco Giants, Chicago Cubs | |
| Steve Lembo | September 16, 1950 | September 27, 1952 | Catcher | Brooklyn Dodgers | |
| Mark Lemke | September 17, 1988 | May 25, 1998 | Second baseman | Atlanta Braves, Boston Red Sox | |
| Bob Lemon β | September 9, 1941 | July 1, 1958 | Pitcher | Cleveland Indians | |
| Chet Lemon | September 9, 1975 | October 3, 1990 | Outfielder | Chicago White Sox, Detroit Tigers | |
| Jim Lemon | August 20, 1950 | September 29, 1963 | Outfielder | Cleveland Indians, Washington Senators/Minnesota Twins, Philadelphia Phillies, Chicago White Sox | |
| Dave Lemonds | June 30, 1969 | October 2, 1972 | Pitcher | Chicago Cubs, Chicago White Sox | |
| Mark Lemongello | September 14, 1976 | July 23, 1979 | Pitcher | Houston Astros, Toronto Blue Jays | |
| Don Lenhardt | April 18, 1950 | September 25, 1954 | Outfielder | St. Louis Browns, Chicago White Sox, Boston Red Sox, Detroit Tigers, Baltimore Orioles | |
| Bill Lennon | May 4, 1871 | July 11, 1873 | Catcher | Fort Wayne Kekiongas, Washington Nationals (NA), Baltimore Marylands | |
| Bob Lennon | September 9, 1954 | May 11, 1957 | Outfielder | New York Giants, Chicago Cubs | |
| Ed Lennon | June 30, 1928 | August 2, 1928 | Pitcher | Philadelphia Phillies | |
| Patrick Lennon | September 15, 1991 | June 1, 1999 | Outfielder | Seattle Mariners, Kansas City Royals, Oakland Athletics, Toronto Blue Jays | |
| Ed Lennox | August 8, 1906 | October 3, 1915 | Third baseman | Philadelphia Athletics, Brooklyn Superbas, Chicago Cubs, Pittsburgh Rebels | |
| Jim Lentine | September 3, 1978 | October 5, 1980 | Outfielder | St. Louis Cardinals, Detroit Tigers | |
| David Lenz | May 7, 1872 | May 21, 1872 | Catcher | Brooklyn Eckfords | |
| Danilo León | June 6, 1992 | August 4, 1992 | Pitcher | Texas Rangers | |
| Eddie Leon | September 9, 1968 | May 4, 1975 | Utility infielder | Cleveland Indians, Chicago White Sox, New York Yankees | |
| Izzy León | June 21, 1945 | September 16, 1945 | Pitcher | Philadelphia Phillies | |
| José León | June 16, 2002 | September 26, 2004 | First baseman | Baltimore Orioles | |
| Max León | July 18, 1973 | September 10, 1978 | Pitcher | Atlanta Braves | |
| Leonard, first name unknown | September 12, 1892 | September 12, 1892 | Outfielder | St. Louis Browns (NL) | |
| Andy Leonard | May 5, 1871 | July 6, 1880 | Outfielder | Washington Olympics, Boston Red Stockings/Red Caps, Cincinnati Reds (1876–1880) | |
| Dennis Leonard | September 4, 1974 | September 27, 1986 | Pitcher | Kansas City Royals | |
| Dutch Leonard (LHP) | April 12, 1913 | July 19, 1925 | Pitcher | Boston Red Sox, Detroit Tigers | |
| Dutch Leonard (RHP) | August 31, 1933 | September 25, 1953 | Pitcher | Brooklyn Dodgers, Washington Senators, Philadelphia Phillies, Chicago Cubs | |
| Elmer Leonard | June 22, 1911 | July 27, 1911 | Pitcher | Philadelphia Athletics | |
| Jeffrey Leonard | September 2, 1977 | October 3, 1990 | Pitcher | Los Angeles Dodgers, Houston Astros, San Francisco Giants, Milwaukee Brewers, Seattle Mariners | |
| Joe Leonard | April 24, 1914 | April 23, 1920 | Third baseman | Pittsburgh Pirates, Cleveland Indians, Washington Senators | |
| Mark Leonard | July 21, 1990 | October 1, 1995 | Outfielder | San Francisco Giants, Baltimore Orioles | |
| Justin Leone | July 2, 2004 | July 21, 2006 | Third baseman | Seattle Mariners, San Diego Padres | |
| Dave Leonhard | September 21, 1967 | September 20, 1972 | Pitcher | Baltimore Orioles | |
| Rudy Leopold | July 4, 1928 | July 25, 1928 | Pitcher | Chicago White Sox | |
| John Leovich | May 1, 1941 | May 1, 1941 | Catcher | Philadelphia Athletics | |
| Ted Lepcio | April 15, 1952 | September 11, 1961 | Second baseman | Boston Red Sox, Detroit Tigers, Philadelphia Phillies, Chicago White Sox, Minnesota Twins | |
| Pete LePine | July 21, 1902 | September 20, 1902 | Outfielder | Detroit Tigers | |
| Don Leppert (2B) | April 11, 1955 | September 25, 1955 | Second baseman | Baltimore Orioles | |
| Don Leppert (C) | June 18, 1961 | September 16, 1964 | Catcher | Pittsburgh Pirates, Washington Senators | |
| Randy Lerch | September 14, 1975 | June 22, 1986 | Pitcher | Philadelphia Phillies, Milwaukee Brewers, Montreal Expos, San Francisco Giants | |
| Dutch Lerchen | August 14, 1910 | October 8, 1910 | Shortstop | Boston Red Sox | |
| George Lerchen | April 15, 1952 | September 13, 1953 | Outfielder | Detroit Tigers, Cincinnati Reds | |
| Anthony Lerew | September 4, 2005 | | Pitcher | Atlanta Braves, Kansas City Royals | |
| Walt Lerian | April 16, 1928 | October 5, 1929 | Catcher | Philadelphia Phillies | |
| Chris Leroux | May 26, 2009 | | Pitcher | Florida Marlins, Pittsburgh Pirates | |
| John LeRoy | September 26, 1997 | September 26, 1997 | Pitcher | Atlanta Braves | |
| Louis Leroy | September 22, 1905 | April 20, 1910 | Pitcher | New York Highlanders, Boston Red Sox | |
| Barry Lersch | April 8, 1969 | September 21, 1974 | Pitcher | Philadelphia Phillies, St. Louis Cardinals | |
| Brian Lesher | August 25, 1996 | September 28, 2002 | Outfielder | Oakland Athletics, Seattle Mariners, Toronto Blue Jays | |
| Don Leshnock | June 7, 1972 | June 7, 1972 | Pitcher | Detroit Tigers | |
| Curt Leskanic | June 27, 1993 | October 2, 2004 | Pitcher | Colorado Rockies, Milwaukee Brewers, Kansas City Royals, Boston Red Sox | |
| Brad Lesley | July 31, 1982 | October 4, 1985 | Pitcher | Cincinnati Reds, Milwaukee Brewers | |
| Roy Leslie | September 6, 1917 | October 1, 1922 | First baseman | Chicago Cubs, St. Louis Cardinals, Philadelphia Phillies | |
| Sam Leslie | October 6, 1929 | September 27, 1938 | First baseman | New York Giants, Brooklyn Dodgers | |
| Jon Lester | June 10, 2006 | | Pitcher | Boston Red Sox | |
| Charlie Letchas | September 16, 1939 | September 29, 1946 | Utility infielder | Philadelphia Phillies, Washington Senators | |
| Tom Letcher | September 27, 1891 | October 4, 1891 | Outfielder | Milwaukee Brewers (AA) | |
| Jesse Levan | September 27, 1947 | May 15, 1955 | Third baseman | Philadelphia Phillies, Washington Senators | |
| Walt Leverenz | April 13, 1913 | July 23, 1915 | Pitcher | St. Louis Browns | |
| Dixie Leverett | May 6, 1922 | September 27, 1929 | Pitcher | Chicago White Sox, Boston Braves | |
| Hod Leverette | April 22, 1920 | May 8, 1920 | Pitcher | St. Louis Browns | |
| Jim Levey | September 17, 1930 | October 1, 1933 | Shortstop | St. Louis Browns | |
| Al Levine | June 22, 1996 | June 10, 2005 | Pitcher | Chicago White Sox, Texas Rangers, Anaheim Angels, Tampa Bay Devil Rays, Kansas City Royals, Detroit Tigers, San Francisco Giants | |
| Charlie Levis | April 17, 1884 | October 1, 1885 | First baseman | Baltimore Monumentals, Washington Nationals (UA), Indianapolis Hoosiers (AA), Baltimore Orioles (AA) | |
| Jesse Levis | April 24, 1992 | October 7, 2001 | Catcher | Cleveland Indians, Milwaukee Brewers, Cleveland Indians | |
| Allen Levrault | June 13, 2000 | June 27, 2003 | Pitcher | Milwaukee Brewers, Florida Marlins | |
| Dutch Levsen | September 28, 1923 | July 31, 1928 | Pitcher | Cleveland Indians | |
| Ed Levy | April 16, 1940 | June 17, 1944 | Outfielder | Philadelphia Phillies, New York Yankees | |
| Dennis Lewallyn | September 21, 1975 | April 27, 1982 | Pitcher | Los Angeles Dodgers, Texas Rangers, Cleveland Indians | |
| Dan Lewandowski | September 22, 1951 | September 30, 1951 | Pitcher | St. Louis Cardinals | |
| Lewis, first name unknown | July 12, 1890 | July 12, 1890 | Utility player | Buffalo Bisons (PL) | |
| Allan Lewis | April 11, 1967 | September 30, 1973 | Outfielder | Kansas City/Oakland Athletics | |
| Bert Lewis | April 19, 1924 | September 20, 1924 | Pitcher | Philadelphia Phillies | |
| Bill Lewis | June 3, 1933 | September 25, 1936 | Catcher | St. Louis Cardinals, Boston Braves/Bees | |
| Buddy Lewis | September 16, 1935 | September 30, 1949 | Utility player | Washington Senators | |
| Colby Lewis | April 1, 2002 | | Pitcher | Texas Rangers, Detroit Tigers, Oakland Athletics | |
| Darren Lewis | August 21, 1990 | July 30, 2002 | Outfielder | Oakland Athletics, San Francisco Giants, Cincinnati Reds, Chicago White Sox, Los Angeles Dodgers, Boston Red Sox, Chicago Cubs | |
| Duffy Lewis | April 16, 1910 | June 6, 1921 | Outfielder | Boston Red Sox, New York Yankees, Washington Senators | |
| Fred Lewis (1880s OF) | July 2, 1881 | August 26, 1886 | Outfielder | Boston Red Caps, Philadelphia Quakers, St. Louis Browns (AA), St. Louis Maroons, Cincinnati Red Stockings (AA) | |
| Fred Lewis (2000s OF) | September 1, 2006 | | Outfielder | San Francisco Giants, Toronto Blue Jays, Cincinnati Reds | |
| Jack Lewis | September 16, 1911 | October 3, 1915 | Second baseman | Boston Red Sox, Pittsburgh Rebels | |
| Jensen Lewis | July 16, 2007 | | Pitcher | Cleveland Indians | |
| Jim Lewis (1980s P) | September 12, 1979 | August 12, 1985 | Pitcher | Seattle Mariners, New York Yankees, Minnesota Twins | |
| Jim Lewis (1990s P) | August 9, 1991 | October 5, 1991 | Pitcher | San Diego Padres | |
| Johnny Lewis | April 14, 1964 | June 11, 1967 | Outfielder | St. Louis Cardinals, New York Mets | |
| Mark Lewis | April 26, 1991 | May 30, 2001 | Utility infielder | Cleveland Indians, Cincinnati Reds, Detroit Tigers, San Francisco Giants, Philadelphia Phillies, Baltimore Orioles | |
| Phil Lewis | April 14, 1905 | September 29, 1908 | Shortstop | Brooklyn Superbas | |
| Richie Lewis | July 31, 1992 | June 4, 1998 | Pitcher | Baltimore Orioles, Florida Marlins, Detroit Tigers, Oakland Athletics, Cincinnati Reds | |
| Rommie Lewis | April 28, 2010 | | Pitcher | Toronto Blue Jays | |
| Scott Lewis (RHP) | September 25, 1990 | July 22, 1994 | Pitcher | California Angels | |
| Scott Lewis (LHP) | September 10, 2008 | April 10, 2009 | Pitcher | Cleveland Indians | |
| Ted Lewis | July 6, 1896 | September 26, 1901 | Pitcher | Boston Beaneaters, Boston Americans | |
| Terry Ley | August 20, 1971 | September 25, 1971 | Pitcher | New York Yankees | |
| Jim Leyritz | June 8, 1990 | September 13, 2000 | Catcher | New York Yankees, Anaheim Angels, Texas Rangers, Boston Red Sox, San Diego Padres, Los Angeles Dodgers | |
| Carlos Lezcano | April 10, 1980 | June 10, 1981 | Outfielder | Chicago Cubs | |
| Sixto Lezcano | September 10, 1974 | September 29, 1985 | Outfielder | Milwaukee Brewers, St. Louis Cardinals, San Diego Padres, Philadelphia Phillies, Pittsburgh Pirates | |
