= List of Major League Baseball players (Li–Lz) =

The following is a list of Major League Baseball players, retired or active.

== Li through Lz ==
Name	Debut	Final game	Position	Teams	Ref
Steve Libby	May 10, 1879	May 10, 1879	First baseman	Buffalo Bisons (NL)	
Al Libke	April 19, 1945	September 29, 1946	Outfielder	Cincinnati Reds	
Frankie Libran	September 3, 1969	September 28, 1969	Shortstop	San Diego Padres	
John Lickert	September 19, 1981	September 19, 1981	Catcher	Boston Red Sox	
Dave Liddell	June 3, 1990	June 3, 1990	Catcher	New York Mets	
Alex Liddi	September 7, 2011	June 17, 2013	Third baseman	Seattle Mariners	
Don Liddle	April 17, 1953	September 19, 1956	Pitcher	Milwaukee Braves, New York Giants, St. Louis Cardinals	
Brad Lidge	April 26, 2002	June 16, 2012	Pitcher	Houston Astros, Philadelphia Phillies, Washington Nationals	
Cory Lidle	May 8, 1997	October 1, 2006	Pitcher	New York Mets, Tampa Bay Devil Rays, Oakland Athletics, Toronto Blue Jays, Cincinnati Reds, Philadelphia Phillies, New York Yankees	
Dutch Lieber	April 18, 1935	April 26, 1936	Pitcher	Philadelphia Athletics	
Jon Lieber	May 15, 1994	September 5, 2008	Pitcher	Pittsburgh Pirates, Chicago Cubs, New York Yankees, Philadelphia Phillies	
Mike Lieberthal	June 30, 1994	September 22, 2007	Catcher	Philadelphia Phillies, Los Angeles Dodgers	
Glenn Liebhardt (1900s P)	October 2, 1906	August 5, 1909	Pitcher	Cleveland Naps	
Glenn Liebhardt (1930s P)	April 22, 1930	August 9, 1938	Pitcher	Philadelphia Athletics, St. Louis Browns	
Jeff Liefer	April 7, 1999	September 30, 2005	Utility player	Chicago White Sox, Montreal Expos, Tampa Bay Devil Rays, Milwaukee Brewers, Cleveland Indians	
Fred Liese	April 14, 1910	April 26, 1910	Pinch hitter	Boston Doves	
Kerry Ligtenberg	August 12, 1997	May 29, 2005	Pitcher	Atlanta Braves, Baltimore Orioles, Toronto Blue Jays, Arizona Diamondbacks	
Bill Lillard	September 11, 1939	September 24, 1940	Shortstop	Philadelphia Athletics	
Gene Lillard	May 8, 1936	May 20, 1940	Pitcher	Chicago Cubs, St. Louis Cardinals	
Brent Lillibridge	April 26, 2008	August 4, 2013	Utility player	Atlanta Braves, Chicago White Sox, Boston Red Sox, Cleveland Indians, Chicago Cubs, New York Yankees	
Jim Lillie	May 17, 1883	October 11, 1886	Outfielder	Buffalo Bisons (NL), Kansas City Cowboys (NL)	
Derek Lilliquist	April 13, 1989	September 6, 1996	Pitcher	Atlanta Braves, San Diego Padres, Cleveland Indians, Boston Red Sox, Cincinnati Reds	
Bob Lillis	August 17, 1958	September 17, 1967	Shortstop	Los Angeles Dodgers, St. Louis Cardinals, Houston Colt .45s/Astros	
Ted Lilly	May 14, 1999	June 4, 2013	Pitcher	Montreal Expos, New York Yankees, Oakland Athletics, Toronto Blue Jays, Chicago Cubs, Los Angeles Dodgers	
José Lima	April 20, 1994	July 7, 2006	Pitcher	Detroit Tigers, Houston Astros, Kansas City Royals, Los Angeles Dodgers, New York Mets	
Lou Limmer	April 21, 1951	September 26, 1954	First baseman	Philadelphia Athletics	
Rufino Linares	April 10, 1981	October 6, 1985	Outfielder	Atlanta Braves, California Angels	
Tim Lincecum	May 6, 2007	August 5, 2016	Pitcher	San Francisco Giants, Los Angeles Angels	
Brad Lincoln	June 9, 2010	April 8, 2014	Pitcher	Pittsburgh Pirates, Toronto Blue Jays, Philadelphia Phillies	
Ezra Lincoln	May 2, 1890	August 12, 1890	Pitcher	Cleveland Spiders, Syracuse Stars (AA)	
Mike Lincoln	April 7, 1999	May 31, 2010	Pitcher	Minnesota Twins, Pittsburgh Pirates, St. Louis Cardinals, Cincinnati Reds	
Adam Lind	September 2, 2006	October 1, 2017	Outfielder	Toronto Blue Jays, Milwaukee Brewers, Seattle Mariners, Washington Nationals	
Carl Lind	September 14, 1927	June 28, 1930	Second baseman	Cleveland Indians	
Jack Lind	September 10, 1974	September 22, 1975	Shortstop	Milwaukee Brewers	
José Lind	August 28, 1987	August 29, 1995	Second baseman	Pittsburgh Pirates, Kansas City Royals, California Angels	
Vive Lindaman	April 14, 1906	July 7, 1909	Pitcher	Boston Beaneaters/Doves	
Em Lindbeck	April 22, 1960	May 1, 1960	Pinch hitter	Detroit Tigers	
Paul Lindblad	September 15, 1965	October 1, 1978	Pitcher	Kansas City/Oakland Athletics, Washington Senators (1961–71)/Texas Rangers, New York Yankees	
Josh Lindblom	June 1, 2011	May 25, 2021	Pitcher	Los Angeles Dodgers, Philadelphia Phillies, Texas Rangers, Oakland Athletics, Pittsburgh Pirates, Milwaukee Brewers	
Lyman Linde	September 11, 1947	May 9, 1948	Pitcher	Cleveland Indians	
Johnny Lindell	April 18, 1941	May 9, 1954	Outfielder	New York Yankees, St. Louis Cardinals, Pittsburgh Pirates, Philadelphia Phillies	
Jim Lindeman	September 3, 1986	August 11, 1994	Outfielder	St. Louis Cardinals, Detroit Tigers, Philadelphia Phillies, Houston Astros, New York Mets	
Bob Lindemann	August 28, 1901	August 31, 1901	Outfielder	Philadelphia Athletics	
Ernie Lindemann	June 28, 1907	June 28, 1907	Pitcher	Boston Doves	
Todd Linden	August 18, 2003	September 30, 2007	Outfielder	San Francisco Giants, Florida Marlins	
Walt Linden	April 30, 1950	May 8, 1950	Catcher	Boston Braves	
Carl Lindquist	September 27, 1943	June 4, 1944	Pitcher	Boston Braves	
Bill Lindsay	June 21, 1911	July 23, 1911	Third baseman	Cleveland Naps	
Chris Lindsay	July 6, 1905	October 7, 1906	First baseman	Detroit Tigers	
Shane Lindsay	September 2, 2011	September 12, 2011	Pitcher	Chicago White Sox	
Bill Lindsey	July 18, 1987	August 18, 1987	Catcher	Chicago White Sox	
Doug Lindsey	October 6, 1991	October 2, 1993	Catcher	Philadelphia Phillies, Chicago White Sox	
Jim Lindsey	May 1, 1922	September 27, 1937	Pitcher	Cleveland Indians, St. Louis Cardinals, Cincinnati Reds, Brooklyn Dodgers	
John Lindsey	September 8, 2010	October 3, 2010	First baseman	Los Angeles Dodgers	
Rod Lindsey	September 2, 2000	October 1, 2000	Outfielder	Detroit Tigers	
Axel Lindstrom	October 3, 1916	October 3, 1916	Pitcher	Philadelphia Athletics	
Charlie Lindstrom	September 28, 1958	September 28, 1958	Catcher	Chicago White Sox	
Freddie Lindstrom β	April 15, 1924	May 15, 1936	Third baseman	New York Giants, Pittsburgh Pirates, Chicago Cubs, Brooklyn Dodgers	
Matt Lindstrom	April 4, 2007	September 26, 2014	Pitcher	Florida Marlins, Houston Astros, Colorado Rockies, Baltimore Orioles, Arizona Diamondbacks, Chicago White Sox	
Scott Linebrink	April 15, 2000	September 28, 2011	Pitcher	San Francisco Giants, Houston Astros, San Diego Padres, Milwaukee Brewers, Chicago White Sox, Atlanta Braves	
Dick Lines	April 16, 1966	October 1, 1967	Pitcher	Washington Senators (1961–71)	
Carl Linhart	August 2, 1952	September 19, 1952	Pinch hitter	Detroit Tigers	
Cole Liniak	September 3, 1999	April 5, 2000	Third baseman	Chicago Cubs	
Fred Link	April 15, 1910	August 25, 1910	Pitcher	Cleveland Naps, St. Louis Browns	
Jon Link	April 20, 2010	September 25, 2010	Pitcher	Los Angeles Dodgers	
Ed Linke	April 27, 1933	September 4, 1938	Pitcher	Washington Senators, St. Louis Browns	
Royce Lint	April 13, 1954	August 29, 1954	Pitcher	St. Louis Cardinals	
Bob Linton	April 26, 1929	September 11, 1929	Catcher	Pittsburgh Pirates	
Doug Linton	August 3, 1992	April 18, 2003	Pitcher	Toronto Blue Jays, California Angels, New York Mets, Kansas City Royals, Baltimore Orioles	
Larry Lintz	July 14, 1973	May 30, 1978	Second baseman	Montreal Expos, St. Louis Cardinals, Oakland Athletics, Cleveland Indians	
Phil Linz	April 13, 1962	September 29, 1968	Shortstop	New York Yankees, Philadelphia Phillies, New York Yankees	
Frank Linzy	August 14, 1963	September 2, 1974	Pitcher	San Francisco Giants, St. Louis Cardinals, Milwaukee Brewers, Philadelphia Phillies	
Angelo LiPetri	April 25, 1956	May 10, 1958	Pitcher	Philadelphia Phillies	
Johnny Lipon	August 16, 1942	April 25, 1954	Shortstop	Detroit Tigers, Boston Red Sox, St. Louis Browns, Cincinnati Reds	
Tom Lipp	September 18, 1897	September 18, 1897	Pitcher	Philadelphia Phillies	
Nig Lipscomb	April 23, 1937	September 20, 1937	Second baseman	St. Louis Browns	
Bob Lipski	April 28, 1963	May 1, 1963	Catcher	Cleveland Indians	
Felipe Lira	April 27, 1995	May 21, 2001	Pitcher	Detroit Tigers, Seattle Mariners, Montreal Expos	
Francisco Liriano	September 5, 2005	September 27, 2019	Pitcher	Minnesota Twins, Chicago White Sox, Pittsburgh Pirates, Toronto Blue Jays, Houston Astros, Detroit Tigers	
Nelson Liriano	August 25, 1987	May 13, 1998	Second baseman	Toronto Blue Jays, Minnesota Twins, Kansas City Royals, Colorado Rockies, Pittsburgh Pirates, Los Angeles Dodgers	
Pedro Liriano	August 27, 2004	September 18, 2005	Pitcher	Milwaukee Brewers, Philadelphia Phillies	
Joe Lis	September 5, 1970	May 8, 1977	First baseman	Philadelphia Phillies, Minnesota Twins, Cleveland Indians, Seattle Mariners	
Hod Lisenbee	April 23, 1927	September 7, 1945	Pitcher	Washington Senators, Boston Red Sox, Philadelphia Athletics, Cincinnati Reds	
Rick Lisi	May 9, 1981	May 29, 1981	Outfielder	Texas Rangers	
Ad Liska	April 17, 1929	September 24, 1933	Pitcher	Washington Senators, Philadelphia Phillies	
Pat Listach	April 8, 1992	June 29, 1997	Shortstop	Milwaukee Brewers, Houston Astros	
Pete Lister	September 14, 1907	October 6, 1907	First baseman	Cleveland Naps	
Jesse Litsch	May 15, 2007	September 25, 2011	Pitcher	Toronto Blue Jays	
Mark Littell	June 14, 1973	June 24, 1982	Pitcher	Kansas City Royals, St. Louis Cardinals	
Bryan Little	July 29, 1982	October 5, 1986	Second baseman	Montreal Expos, Chicago White Sox, New York Yankees	
Harry Little	July 16, 1877	October 6, 1877	Outfielder	St. Louis Brown Stockings, Louisville Grays	
Jack Little (1912 outfielder)	July 2, 1912	July 2, 1912	Outfielder	New York Highlanders	
Jack Little (2020s pitcher)	June 19, 2025		Pitcher	Los Angeles Dodgers	
Jeff Little	September 6, 1980	October 3, 1982	Pitcher	St. Louis Cardinals, Minnesota Twins	
Mark Little	September 12, 1998	July 20, 2004	Outfielder	St. Louis Cardinals, Colorado Rockies, New York Mets, Arizona Diamondbacks, Cleveland Indians	
Scott Little	July 27, 1989	August 6, 1989	Outfielder	Pittsburgh Pirates	
Dick Littlefield	July 7, 1950	May 30, 1958	Pitcher	Boston Red Sox, Chicago White Sox, Detroit Tigers, St. Louis Browns/Baltimore Orioles, Pittsburgh Pirates, St. Louis Cardinals, New York Giants, Chicago Cubs, Milwaukee Braves	
John Littlefield	June 8, 1980	October 4, 1981	Pitcher	St. Louis Cardinals, San Diego Padres	
Carlisle Littlejohn	May 11, 1927	June 23, 1928	Pitcher	St. Louis Cardinals	
Dennis Littlejohn	July 9, 1978	October 5, 1980	Catcher	San Francisco Giants	
Larry Littleton	April 12, 1981	May 26, 1981	Outfielder	Cleveland Indians	
Wes Littleton	July 4, 2006	September 26, 2008	Pitcher	Texas Rangers	
Greg Litton	May 2, 1989	August 10, 1994	Utility player	San Francisco Giants, Seattle Mariners, Boston Red Sox	
Jack Littrell	April 19, 1952	September 15, 1957	Shortstop	Philadelphia/Kansas City Athletics, Chicago Cubs	
Danny Litwhiler	April 25, 1940	September 25, 1951	Outfielder	Philadelphia Phillies, St. Louis Cardinals, Boston Braves, Cincinnati Reds	
Buddy Lively	April 17, 1947	September 25, 1949	Pitcher	Cincinnati Reds	
Jack Lively	April 16, 1911	October 6, 1911	Pitcher	Detroit Tigers	
Wes Livengood	May 30, 1939	July 2, 1939	Pitcher	Cincinnati Reds	
Bobby Livingston	April 25, 2006	August 21, 2007	Pitcher	Seattle Mariners, Cincinnati Reds	
Mickey Livingston	September 17, 1938	September 20, 1951	Catcher	Washington Senators, Philadelphia Phillies, Chicago Cubs, New York Giants, Boston Braves, Brooklyn Dodgers	
Paddy Livingston	September 2, 1901	June 15, 1917	Catcher	Cleveland Blues (AL), Cincinnati Reds, Philadelphia Athletics, Cleveland Naps, St. Louis Cardinals	
Jake Livingstone	September 6, 1901	September 9, 1901	Pitcher	New York Giants	
Scott Livingstone	July 19, 1991	September 26, 1998	Third baseman	Detroit Tigers, San Diego Padres, St. Louis Cardinals, Montreal Expos	
Radhames Liz	August 25, 2007	September 10, 2015	Pitcher	Baltimore Orioles, Pittsburgh Pirates	
Abel Lizotte	September 17, 1896	September 26, 1896	First baseman	Pittsburgh Pirates	
Winston Llenas	August 15, 1968	September 14, 1975	Utility player	California Angels	
Clem Llewellyn	June 18, 1922	June 18, 1922	Pitcher	New York Yankees	
Graeme Lloyd	April 11, 1993	September 27, 2003	Pitcher	Milwaukee Brewers, New York Yankees, Toronto Blue Jays, Montreal Expos, Florida Marlins, New York Mets, Kansas City Royals	
Esteban Loaiza	April 29, 1995	June 11, 2008	Pitcher	Pittsburgh Pirates, Texas Rangers, Toronto Blue Jays, Chicago White Sox, New York Yankees, Washington Nationals, Oakland Athletics, Los Angeles Dodgers	
Mike Loan	September 18, 1912	September 18, 1912	Catcher	Philadelphia Phillies	
Bob Loane	July 29, 1939	May 19, 1940	Outfielder	Washington Senators, Boston Braves	
José Lobatón	July 5, 2009	June 29, 2021	Catcher	San Diego Padres, Tampa Bay Rays, Washington Nationals, New York Mets, Chicago Cubs	
Frank Lobert	June 6, 1914	June 22, 1914	Third baseman	Baltimore Terrapins	
Hans Lobert	September 21, 1903	October 3, 1917	Third baseman	Pittsburgh Pirates, Chicago Cubs, Cincinnati Reds, Philadelphia Phillies, New York Giants	
Harry Lochhead	April 16, 1899	May 15, 1901	Shortstop	Cleveland Spiders, Detroit Tigers, Philadelphia Athletics	
Don Lock	July 17, 1962	October 1, 1969	Outfielder	Washington Senators (1961–71), Philadelphia Phillies, Boston Red Sox	
Bobby Locke	June 18, 1959	September 29, 1968	Pitcher	Cleveland Indians, St. Louis Cardinals, Philadelphia Phillies, Cincinnati Reds, California Angels	
Chuck Locke	September 16, 1955	September 23, 1955	Pitcher	Baltimore Orioles	
Jeff Locke	September 10, 2011	July 3, 2017	Pitcher	Pittsburgh Pirates, Miami Marlins	
Marshall Locke	July 5, 1884	July 20, 1884	Outfielder	Indianapolis Hoosiers (AA)	
Ron Locke	April 23, 1964	October 4, 1964	Pitcher	New York Mets	
Bob Locker	April 14, 1965	June 20, 1975	Pitcher	Chicago White Sox, Seattle Pilots/Milwaukee Brewers, Oakland Athletics, Chicago Cubs	
Keith Lockhart	April 5, 1994	September 27, 2003	Second baseman	San Diego Padres, Kansas City Royals, Atlanta Braves	
Gene Locklear	April 5, 1973	October 2, 1977	Outfielder	Cincinnati Reds, San Diego Padres, New York Yankees	
Stu Locklin	June 23, 1955	May 30, 1956	Outfielder	Cleveland Indians	
Whitey Lockman	July 5, 1945	June 24, 1960	Utility infielder	New York Giants, St. Louis Cardinals, San Francisco Giants, Baltimore Orioles, Cincinnati Reds	
Milo Lockwood	April 17, 1884	May 26, 1884	Utility player	Washington Nationals (UA)	
Skip Lockwood	April 23, 1965	September 10, 1980	Pitcher	Seattle Pilots/Milwaukee Brewers, California Angels, New York Mets, Boston Red Sox	
Dario Lodigiani	April 18, 1938	August 18, 1946	Third baseman	Philadelphia Athletics, Chicago White Sox	
Paul Lo Duca	June 21, 1998	September 27, 2008	Catcher	Los Angeles Dodgers, Florida Marlins, New York Mets, Washington Nationals	
Kameron Loe	September 26, 2004	September 28, 2013	Pitcher	Texas Rangers, Milwaukee Brewers, Seattle Mariners, Chicago Cubs, Atlanta Braves	
George Loepp	August 29, 1928	July 23, 1930	Outfielder	Boston Red Sox, Washington Senators	
Billy Loes	May 18, 1950	September 14, 1961	Pitcher	Brooklyn Dodgers, Baltimore Orioles, San Francisco Giants	
Adam Loewen	May 23, 2006	August 14, 2016	Pitcher/Outfielder	Baltimore Orioles, Toronto Blue Jays, Philadelphia Phillies, Arizona Diamondbacks	
Carlton Loewer	June 14, 1998	June 7, 2003	Pitcher	Philadelphia Phillies, San Diego Padres	
James Lofton	September 19, 2001	October 5, 2001	Shortstop	Boston Red Sox	
Kenny Lofton	September 14, 1991	September 29, 2007	Outfielder	Houston Astros, Cleveland Indians, Atlanta Braves, Chicago White Sox, San Francisco Giants, Pittsburgh Pirates, Chicago Cubs, New York Yankees, Philadelphia Phillies, Los Angeles Dodgers, Texas Rangers	
Dick Loftus	April 20, 1924	September 14, 1925	Outfielder	Brooklyn Robins	
Frank Loftus	September 26, 1926	September 26, 1926	Pitcher	Washington Senators	
Tom Loftus	August 17, 1877	May 13, 1883	Outfielder	St. Louis Brown Stockings, St. Louis Browns	
Bob Logan	April 18, 1935	September 20, 1945	Pitcher	Brooklyn Dodgers, Detroit Tigers, Chicago Cubs, Cincinnati Reds, Boston Braves	
Boone Logan	April 4, 2006	June 16, 2018	Pitcher	Chicago White Sox, Atlanta Braves, New York Yankees, Colorado Rockies, Cleveland Indians, Milwaukee Brewers	
Johnny Logan	April 17, 1951	September 27, 1963	Shortstop	Boston/Milwaukee Braves, Pittsburgh Pirates	
Nook Logan	July 21, 2004	September 30, 2007	Outfielder	Detroit Tigers, Washington Nationals	
Pete Lohman	May 11, 1891	July 20, 1891	Catcher	Washington Statesmen	
Howard Lohr	June 17, 1914	August 5, 1916	Outfielder	Cincinnati Reds, Cleveland Indians	
Jack Lohrke	April 18, 1947	June 10, 1953	Third baseman	New York Giants, Philadelphia Phillies	
Bill Lohrman	June 19, 1934	June 10, 1944	Pitcher	Philadelphia Phillies, New York Giants, St. Louis Cardinals, Brooklyn Dodgers, Cincinnati Reds	
Kyle Lohse	June 22, 2001	July 19, 2016	Pitcher	Minnesota Twins, Cincinnati Reds, Philadelphia Phillies, St. Louis Cardinals, Milwaukee Brewers, Texas Rangers	
Alberto Lois	September 8, 1978	September 29, 1979	Outfielder	Pittsburgh Pirates	
Rich Loiselle	September 7, 1996	October 6, 2001	Pitcher	Pittsburgh Pirates	
Mickey Lolich	May 12, 1963	September 23, 1979	Pitcher	Detroit Tigers, New York Mets, San Diego Padres	
Ron Lolich	July 18, 1971	September 28, 1973	Outfielder	Chicago White Sox, Cleveland Indians	
Sherm Lollar	April 20, 1946	September 7, 1963	Catcher	Cleveland Indians, New York Yankees, St. Louis Cardinals, Chicago White Sox	
Tim Lollar	June 28, 1980	October 5, 1986	Pitcher	New York Yankees, San Diego Padres, Chicago White Sox, Boston Red Sox	
Doug Loman	September 3, 1984	May 11, 1985	Outfielder	Milwaukee Brewers	
Steve Lomasney	October 3, 1999	October 3, 1999	Catcher	Boston Red Sox	
George Lombard	September 4, 1998	October 1, 2006	Outfielder	Atlanta Braves, Detroit Tigers, Tampa Bay Devil Rays, Washington Nationals	
Ernie Lombardi β	April 15, 1931	September 17, 1947	Catcher	Brooklyn Robins, Cincinnati Reds, Boston Braves, New York Giants	
Phil Lombardi	April 26, 1986	October 1, 1989	Catcher	New York Yankees, New York Mets	
Vic Lombardi	April 18, 1945	September 24, 1950	Pitcher	Brooklyn Dodgers, Pittsburgh Pirates	
Lou Lombardo	September 22, 1948	October 3, 1948	Pitcher	New York Giants	
Steve Lombardozzi	July 12, 1985	April 11, 1990	Second baseman	Minnesota Twins, Houston Astros	
Steve Lombardozzi Jr.	September 6, 2011	May 12, 2017	Infielder/Outfielder	Washington Nationals, Baltimore Orioles, Pittsburgh Pirates, Miami Marlins	
Kevin Lomon	April 27, 1995	September 28, 1996	Pitcher	New York Mets, Atlanta Braves	
Jim Lonborg	April 23, 1965	June 10, 1979	Pitcher	Boston Red Sox, Milwaukee Brewers, Philadelphia Phillies	
Walter Lonergan	August 17, 1911	September 22, 1911	Second baseman	Boston Red Sox	
James Loney	April 4, 2006	October 2, 2016	First baseman	Los Angeles Dodgers, Boston Red Sox, Tampa Bay Rays, New York Mets	
Bill Long	July 21, 1985	April 14, 1991	Pitcher	Chicago White Sox, Chicago Cubs, Montreal Expos	
Bob Long	September 2, 1981	October 2, 1985	Pitcher	Pittsburgh Pirates, Seattle Mariners	
Dale Long	April 21, 1951	July 18, 1963	First baseman	Pittsburgh Pirates, St. Louis Browns, Chicago Cubs, New York Yankees, Washington Senators (1961–71)	
Dan Long	August 27, 1890	October 15, 1890	Outfielder	Baltimore Orioles (AA)	
Herman Long	April 17, 1889	July 13, 1904	Shortstop	Kansas City Cowboys (AA), Boston Beaneaters, New York Highlanders, Detroit Tigers, Philadelphia Phillies	
Jeoff Long	July 31, 1963	September 23, 1964	Utility player	St. Louis Cardinals, Chicago White Sox	
Jim Long	August 9, 1891	August 30, 1893	Outfielder	Louisville Colonels, Baltimore Orioles (NL)	
Jimmie Long	September 12, 1922	September 30, 1922	Catcher	Chicago White Sox	
Joey Long	April 25, 1997	May 24, 1997	Pitcher	San Diego Padres	
Lep Long	June 29, 1911	July 17, 1911	Pitcher	Philadelphia Athletics	
Red Long	September 11, 1902	September 11, 1902	Pitcher	Boston Beaneaters	
Ryan Long	July 16, 1997	July 23, 1997	Outfielder	Kansas City Royals	
Terrence Long	April 14, 1999	June 5, 2006	Outfielder	New York Mets, Oakland Athletics, San Diego Padres, Kansas City Royals, New York Yankees	
Tom Long (OF)	September 11, 1911	September 30, 1917	Outfielder	Washington Senators, St. Louis Cardinals	
Tom Long (P)	April 26, 1924	April 26, 1924	Pitcher	Brooklyn Robins	
Thomas Long	August 29, 1888	August 29, 1888	Outfielder	Louisville Colonels	
Tony Longmire	September 3, 1993	August 6, 1995	Outfielder	Philadelphia Phillies	
Evan Longoria	April 12, 2008	October 1, 2023	Third baseman	Tampa Bay Rays, San Francisco Giants, Arizona Diamondbacks	
Joe Lonnett	April 22, 1956	September 26, 1959	Catcher	Philadelphia Phillies	
Bruce Look	April 17, 1968	September 29, 1968	Catcher	Minnesota Twins	
Dean Look	September 22, 1961	September 30, 1961	Outfielder	Chicago White Sox	
Brian Looney	September 26, 1993	June 8, 1995	Pitcher	Montreal Expos, Boston Red Sox	
Aaron Looper	August 2, 2003	September 28, 2003	Pitcher	Seattle Mariners	
Braden Looper	March 31, 1998	October 2, 2009	Pitcher	St. Louis Cardinals, Florida Marlins, New York Mets, Milwaukee Brewers	
Pete Loos	May 2, 1901	May 2, 1901	Pitcher	Philadelphia Athletics	
Eddie Lopat	April 30, 1944	September 23, 1955	Pitcher	Chicago White Sox, New York Yankees, Baltimore Orioles	
Stan Lopata	September 19, 1948	June 12, 1960	Catcher	Philadelphia Phillies, Milwaukee Brewers	
Art Lopatka	September 12, 1945	July 1, 1946	Pitcher	St. Louis Cardinals, Philadelphia Phillies	
Davey Lopes	September 22, 1972	October 4, 1987	Second baseman	Los Angeles Dodgers, Oakland Athletics, Chicago Cubs, Houston Astros	
Al López β	September 27, 1928	September 16, 1947	Catcher	Brooklyn Robins/Dodgers, Boston Bees, Pittsburgh Pirates, Cleveland Indians	
Albie López	July 6, 1993	June 19, 2003	Pitcher	Cleveland Indians, Tampa Bay Devil Rays, Arizona Diamondbacks, Atlanta Braves, Kansas City Royals	
Aquilino López	April 2, 2003	September 29, 2008	Pitcher	Toronto Blue Jays, Colorado Rockies, Philadelphia Phillies, Detroit Tigers	
Art López	April 12, 1965	September 29, 1965	Outfielder	New York Yankees	
Arturo López	April 29, 2009	May 10, 2009	Pitcher	San Diego Padres	
Aurelio López	September 1, 1974	June 17, 1987	Pitcher	Kansas City Royals, St. Louis Cardinals, Detroit Tigers, Houston Astros	
Carlos López	September 17, 1976	October 1, 1978	Outfielder	California Angels, Seattle Mariners, Baltimore Orioles	
Felipe López	August 3, 2001	August 20, 2011	Shortstop	Toronto Blue Jays, Cincinnati Reds, Washington Nationals, St. Louis Cardinals, Arizona Diamondbacks, Milwaukee Brewers, Boston Red Sox, Tampa Bay Rays	
Héctor López	May 12, 1955	September 30, 1966	Utility player	Kansas City Athletics, New York Yankees	
Javier López	April 1, 2003	September 29, 2016	Pitcher	Colorado Rockies, Arizona Diamondbacks, Boston Red Sox, Pittsburgh Pirates, San Francisco Giants	
Javy López	September 18, 1992	September 2, 2006	Catcher	Atlanta Braves, Baltimore Orioles, Boston Red Sox	
José López	July 31, 2004	October 3, 2012	Second baseman	Seattle Mariners, Florida Marlins, Colorado Rockies, Cleveland Indians, Chicago White Sox	
Luis Lopez (C)	September 14, 1990	October 6, 1991	Utility player	Los Angeles Dodgers, Cleveland Indians	
Luis López (IF)	September 7, 1993	June 19, 2005	Utility infielder	San Diego Padres, New York Mets, Milwaukee Brewers, Baltimore Orioles, Cincinnati Reds	
Luis Lopez (3B)	April 29, 2001	April 24, 2004	Third baseman	Toronto Blue Jays, Montreal Expos	
Marcelino López	April 14, 1963	September 24, 1972	Pitcher	Philadelphia Phillies, California Angels, Baltimore Orioles, Milwaukee Brewers, Cleveland Indians	
Mendy López	June 3, 1998	May 27, 2004	Shortstop	Kansas City Royals, Florida Marlins, Houston Astros, Pittsburgh Pirates	
Mickey Lopez	September 6, 2004	October 3, 2004	Second baseman	Seattle Mariners	
Pedro López	May 1, 2005	September 30, 2007	Shortstop	Chicago White Sox, Cincinnati Reds	
Ramón López	August 21, 1966	September 22, 1966	Pitcher	California Angels	
Rodrigo López	April 29, 2000	April 22, 2012	Pitcher	San Diego Padres, Baltimore Orioles, Colorado Rockies, Philadelphia Phillies, Arizona Diamondbacks, Chicago Cubs	
Wilton López	August 28, 2009	April 8, 2014	Pitcher	Houston Astros, Colorado Rockies	
Bris Lord	April 21, 1905	October 3, 1913	Outfielder	Philadelphia Athletics, Cleveland Naps, Boston Braves	
Carlton Lord	July 12, 1923	September 27, 1923	Third baseman	Philadelphia Phillies	
Harry Lord	September 25, 1907	September 27, 1915	Third baseman	Boston Americans/Red Sox, Chicago White Sox, Buffalo Blues	
Lefty Lorenzen	September 12, 1913	September 12, 1913	Pitcher	Detroit Tigers	
Mark Loretta	September 4, 1995	October 4, 2009	Second baseman	Milwaukee Brewers, Houston Astros, San Diego Padres, Boston Red Sox, Los Angeles Dodgers	
Andrew Lorraine	July 17, 1994	September 26, 2002	Pitcher	California Angels, Chicago White Sox, Oakland Athletics, Seattle Mariners, Chicago Cubs, Cleveland Indians, Milwaukee Brewers	
Joe Lotz	July 15, 1916	September 25, 1916	Pitcher	St. Louis Cardinals	
Scott Loucks	September 1, 1980	May 29, 1985	Outfielder	Houston Astros, Pittsburgh Pirates	
Art Loudell	August 13, 1910	September 24, 1910	Pitcher	Detroit Tigers	
Baldy Louden	September 13, 1907	September 18, 1916	Second baseman	New York Highlanders, Detroit Tigers, Buffalo Buffeds/Blues, Cincinnati Reds	
Charlie Loudenslager	April 15, 1904	April 15, 1904	Second baseman	Brooklyn Superbas	
Larry Loughlin	May 27, 1967	June 14, 1967	Pitcher	Philadelphia Phillies	
Bill Loughran	June 6, 1884	August 28, 1884	Catcher	New York Gothams	
Don Loun	September 23, 1964	October 3, 1964	Pitcher	Washington Senators (1961–71)	
Shane Loux	September 10, 2002	September 30, 2012	Pitcher	Detroit Tigers, Los Angeles Angels of Anaheim, San Francisco Giants	
Slim Love	September 8, 1913	April 18, 1920	Pitcher	Washington Senators, New York Yankees, Detroit Tigers	
Tom Lovelace	September 23, 1922	September 23, 1922	Pinch hitter	Pittsburgh Pirates	
Vance Lovelace	September 10, 1988	September 22, 1990	Pitcher	California Angels, Seattle Mariners	
Lynn Lovenguth	April 18, 1955	September 27, 1957	Pitcher	Philadelphia Phillies, St. Louis Cardinals	
John Lovett	May 22, 1903	May 26, 1903	Pitcher	St. Louis Cardinals	
Len Lovett	August 4, 1873	May 19, 1875	Outfielder	Elizabeth Resolutes, Philadelphia Centennials	
Mem Lovett	September 4, 1933	September 4, 1933	Pinch hitter	Chicago White Sox	
Tom Lovett	June 4, 1885	July 9, 1894	Pitcher	Philadelphia Athletics (AA), Brooklyn Bridegrooms/Grooms, Boston Beaneaters	
Jay Loviglio	September 2, 1980	July 26, 1983	Second baseman	Philadelphia Phillies, Chicago White Sox, Chicago Cubs	
Joe Lovitto	April 15, 1972	September 16, 1975	Outfielder	Texas Rangers	
Pete Lovrich	April 26, 1963	September 5, 1963	Pitcher	Kansas City Athletics	
Torey Lovullo	September 10, 1988	October 3, 1999	Second baseman	Detroit Tigers, New York Yankees, California Angels, Seattle Mariners, Oakland Athletics, Cleveland Indians, Philadelphia Phillies	
Fletcher Low	October 7, 1915	October 7, 1915	Third baseman	Boston Braves	
Grover Lowdermilk	July 3, 1909	May 12, 1920	Pitcher	St. Louis Cardinals, Chicago Cubs, St. Louis Browns, Detroit Tigers, Cleveland Indians, Chicago White Sox	
Lou Lowdermilk	April 20, 1911	May 16, 1912	Pitcher	St. Louis Cardinals	
Bobby Lowe	April 19, 1890	October 6, 1907	Second baseman	Boston Beaneaters, Chicago Orphans/Cubs, Pittsburgh Pirates, Detroit Tigers	
Charlie Lowe	September 24, 1872	October 31, 1872	Second baseman	Brooklyn Atlantics	
Derek Lowe	April 26, 1997	May 19, 2013	Pitcher	Seattle Mariners, Boston Red Sox, Los Angeles Dodgers, Atlanta Braves, Cleveland Indians, New York Yankees, Texas Rangers	
Dick Lowe	June 26, 1884	June 26, 1884	Catcher	Detroit Wolverines	
George Lowe	July 28, 1920	July 28, 1920	Pitcher	Cincinnati Reds	
Mark Lowe	July 7, 2006	September 23, 2016	Pitcher	Seattle Mariners, Texas Rangers, Los Angeles Angels of Anaheim, Cleveland Indians, Toronto Blue Jays, Detroit Tigers	
Sean Lowe	August 29, 1997	July 30, 2003	Pitcher	St. Louis Cardinals, Chicago White Sox, Pittsburgh Pirates, Colorado Rockies, Kansas City Royals	
Mike Lowell	September 13, 1998	October 2, 2010	Third baseman	New York Yankees, Florida Marlins, Boston Red Sox	
John Lowenstein	September 2, 1970	May 4, 1985	Outfielder	Cleveland Indians, Texas Rangers, Baltimore Orioles	
Devon Lowery	September 5, 2008	September 28, 2008	Pitcher	Kansas City Royals	
Terrell Lowery	September 13, 1997	October 1, 2000	Outfielder	Chicago Cubs, Tampa Bay Devil Rays, San Francisco Giants	
Turk Lown	April 24, 1951	September 22, 1962	Pitcher	Chicago Cubs, Cincinnati Redlegs, Chicago White Sox	
Peanuts Lowrey	April 14, 1942	August 30, 1955	Outfielder	Chicago Cubs, Cincinnati Reds, St. Louis Cardinals, Philadelphia Phillies	
Jed Lowrie	April 15, 2008	August 7, 2022	Shortstop	Boston Red Sox, Houston Astros, Oakland Athletics, New York Mets	
Dwight Lowry	April 3, 1984	April 23, 1988	Catcher	Detroit Tigers, Minnesota Twins	
John Lowry	June 26, 1875	July 4, 1875	Outfielder	Washington Nationals (NA)	
Noah Lowry	September 5, 2003	August 29, 2007	Pitcher	San Francisco Giants	
Sam Lowry	September 19, 1942	October 2, 1943	Pitcher	Philadelphia Athletics	
Mike Loynd	July 24, 1986	October 1, 1987	Pitcher	Texas Rangers	
Willie Lozado	July 16, 1984	September 30, 1984	Third baseman	Milwaukee Brewers	
Steve Lubratich	September 27, 1981	September 30, 1983	Utility infielder	California Angels	
Hal Luby	September 10, 1936	September 29, 1944	Utility infielder	Philadelphia Athletics, New York Giants	
Pat Luby	June 16, 1890	June 11, 1895	Pitcher	Chicago Colts, Louisville Colonels	
Johnny Lucadello	September 24, 1938	June 13, 1947	Second baseman	St. Louis Browns, New York Yankees	
Fred Lucas	July 15, 1935	September 24, 1935	Outfielder	Philadelphia Phillies	
Gary Lucas	April 16, 1980	October 3, 1987	Pitcher	San Diego Padres, Montreal Expos, California Angels	
Johnny Lucas	April 15, 1931	April 16, 1932	Outfielder	Boston Red Sox	
Ray Lucas	September 28, 1929	June 6, 1934	Pitcher	New York Giants, Brooklyn Dodgers	
Red Lucas	April 19, 1923	October 1, 1938	Pitcher	New York Giants, Boston Braves, Cincinnati Reds, Pittsburgh Pirates	
Frank Luce	September 17, 1923	October 7, 1923	Outfielder	Pittsburgh Pirates	
Joe Lucey	July 6, 1920	June 25, 1925	Pitcher	New York Yankees, Boston Red Sox	
Con Lucid	May 1, 1893	August 15, 1897	Pitcher	Louisville Colonels, Brooklyn Grooms, Philadelphia Phillies, St. Louis Browns (NL)	
Lou Lucier	April 23, 1943	June 13, 1945	Pitcher	Boston Red Sox, Philadelphia Phillies	
Jonathan Lucroy	May 21, 2010	July 10, 2021	Catcher	Milwaukee Brewers, Texas Rangers, Colorado Rockies, Oakland Athletics, Los Angeles Angels, Chicago Cubs, Boston Red Sox, Washington Nationals, Atlanta Braves	
Donny Lucy	September 5, 2007	September 28, 2011	Catcher	Chicago White Sox	
Fred Luderus	September 23, 1909	June 23, 1920	First baseman	Chicago Cubs, Philadelphia Phillies	
Willie Ludolph	May 28, 1924	June 20, 1924	Pitcher	Detroit Tigers	
Eric Ludwick	September 1, 1996	April 8, 1999	Pitcher	St. Louis Cardinals, Oakland Athletics, Florida Marlins, Toronto Blue Jays	
Ryan Ludwick	June 5, 2002	September 27, 2014	Outfielder	Texas Rangers, Cleveland Indians, St. Louis Cardinals, San Diego Padres, Pittsburgh Pirates, Cincinnati Reds	
Bill Ludwig	April 16, 1908	October 3, 1908	Catcher	St. Louis Cardinals	
Roy Luebbe	August 22, 1925	September 19, 1925	Catcher	New York Yankees	
Steve Luebber	June 27, 1971	September 29, 1981	Pitcher	Minnesota Twins, Toronto Blue Jays, Baltimore Orioles	
Larry Luebbers	July 3, 1993	September 26, 2000	Pitcher	Cincinnati Reds, St. Louis Cardinals	
Cory Luebke	September 3, 2010	June 17, 2016	Pitcher	San Diego Padres, Pittsburgh Pirates	
Dick Luebke	August 11, 1962	September 24, 1962	Pitcher	Baltimore Orioles	
Rick Luecken	June 6, 1989	September 29, 1990	Pitcher	Kansas City Royals, Atlanta Braves, Toronto Blue Jays	
Josh Lueke	April 3, 2011	June 5, 2014	Pitcher	Seattle Mariners, Tampa Bay Rays	
Henry Luff	April 19, 1875	July 5, 1884	Utility player	New Haven Elm Citys, Detroit Wolverines, Cincinnati Red Stockings (AA), Louisville Eclipse, Philadelphia Keystones, Kansas City Cowboys (UA)	
Julio Lugo	April 15, 2000	August 23, 2011	Shortstop	Houston Astros, Tampa Bay Devil Rays, Los Angeles Dodgers, Boston Red Sox, St. Louis Cardinals, Baltimore Orioles, Atlanta Braves	
Ruddy Lugo	April 3, 2006	September 27, 2007	Pitcher	Tampa Bay Devil Rays, Oakland Athletics	
Urbano Lugo	April 28, 1985	May 11, 1990	Pitcher	California Angels, Montreal Expos, Detroit Tigers	
Wild Bill Luhrsen	August 23, 1913	September 13, 1913	Pitcher	Pittsburgh Pirates	
Rob Lukachyk	July 5, 1996	July 6, 1996	Pinch hitter	Montreal Expos	
Mark Lukasiewicz	May 11, 2001	September 29, 2002	Pitcher	Anaheim Angels	
Matt Luke	April 3, 1996	September 30, 1999	Outfielder	New York Yankees, Los Angeles Dodgers, Cleveland Indians, Anaheim Angels	
Al Lukens	June 23, 1894	July 4, 1894	Pitcher	Philadelphia Phillies	
Eddie Lukon	August 6, 1941	September 28, 1947	Outfielder	Cincinnati Reds	
Mike Lum	September 12, 1967	September 30, 1981	Outfielder	Atlanta Braves, Cincinnati Reds, Chicago Cubs	
Ralph Lumenti	September 7, 1957	September 27, 1959	Pitcher	Washington Senators	
Harry Lumley	April 14, 1904	May 19, 1910	Outfielder	Brooklyn Superbas	
Jerry Lumpe	April 17, 1956	October 1, 1967	Second baseman	New York Yankees, Kansas City Athletics, Detroit Tigers	
Héctor Luna	April 8, 2004	August 17, 2012	Second baseman	St. Louis Cardinals, Cleveland Indians, Toronto Blue Jays, Florida Marlins, Philadelphia Phillies	
Memo Luna	April 20, 1954	April 20, 1954	Pitcher	St. Louis Cardinals	
Fernando Lunar	May 8, 2000	April 11, 2002	Catcher	Atlanta Braves, Baltimore Orioles	
Don Lund	July 3, 1945	July 29, 1954	Outfielder	Brooklyn Dodgers, St. Louis Browns, Detroit Tigers	
Gordy Lund	August 1, 1967	August 8, 1969	Shortstop	Cleveland Indians, Seattle Pilots	
Jack Lundbom	May 9, 1902	September 4, 1902	Pitcher	Cleveland Bronchos	
Carl Lundgren	June 19, 1902	April 23, 1909	Pitcher	Chicago Orphans/Cubs	
Del Lundgren	April 27, 1924	October 1, 1927	Pitcher	Pittsburgh Pirates, Boston Red Sox	
David Lundquist	April 6, 1999	June 28, 2002	Pitcher	Chicago White Sox, San Diego Padres	
Tom Lundstedt	August 31, 1973	September 28, 1975	Catcher	Chicago Cubs, Minnesota Twins	
Trey Lunsford	September 12, 2002	June 18, 2003	Catcher	San Francisco Giants	
Harry Lunte	May 19, 1919	September 23, 1920	Shortstop	Cleveland Indians	
Tony Lupien	September 12, 1940	October 3, 1948	First baseman	Boston Red Sox, Philadelphia Phillies, Chicago White Sox	
Al Luplow	September 16, 1961	September 26, 1967	Outfielder	Cleveland Indians, New York Mets, Pittsburgh Pirates	
Dolf Luque	May 20, 1914	April 26, 1935	Pitcher	Boston Braves, Cincinnati Reds, Brooklyn Robins, New York Giants	
Scott Lusader	September 1, 1987	May 11, 1991	Outfielder	Detroit Tigers, New York Yankees	
Billy Lush	September 3, 1895	October 8, 1904	Outfielder	Washington Senators (NL), Boston Beaneaters, Detroit Tigers, Cleveland Naps	
Ernie Lush	July 20, 1910	July 20, 1910	Outfielder	St. Louis Cardinals	
Johnny Lush	April 22, 1904	October 13, 1910	Pitcher	Philadelphia Phillies, St. Louis Cardinals	
Charlie Luskey	September 12, 1901	September 23, 1901	Outfielder	Washington Senators	
Luke Lutenberg	July 7, 1894	September 30, 1894	First baseman	Louisville Colonels	
Lyle Luttrell	May 15, 1956	May 16, 1957	Shortstop	Washington Senators	
Joe Lutz	April 17, 1951	May 6, 1951	First baseman	St. Louis Browns	
Red Lutz	May 31, 1922	May 31, 1922	Catcher	Cincinnati Reds	
Rube Lutzke	April 18, 1923	September 13, 1927	Third baseman	Cleveland Indians	
Keith Luuloa	May 17, 2000	May 31, 2000	Utility infielder	Anaheim Angels	
Greg Luzinski	September 9, 1970	September 24, 1984	Outfielder	Philadelphia Phillies, Chicago White Sox	
Mitch Lyden	June 16, 1993	October 3, 1993	Catcher	Florida Marlins	
Scott Lydy	May 18, 1993	October 3, 1993	Outfielder	Oakland Athletics	
Jim Lyle	October 2, 1925	October 2, 1925	Pitcher	Washington Senators	
Sparky Lyle	July 4, 1967	September 27, 1982	Pitcher	Boston Red Sox, New York Yankees, Texas Rangers, Philadelphia Phillies, Chicago White Sox	
Jordan Lyles	May 31, 2011		Pitcher	Houston Astros, Colorado Rockies, San Diego Padres, Pittsburgh Pirates, Milwaukee Brewers, Texas Rangers, Baltimore Orioles, Kansas City Royals	
Adrian Lynch	August 4, 1920	October 2, 1920	Pitcher	St. Louis Browns	
Danny Lynch	September 14, 1948	October 2, 1948	Second baseman	Chicago Cubs	
Ed Lynch	August 31, 1980	October 1, 1987	Pitcher	New York Mets, Chicago Cubs	
Henry Lynch	September 21, 1893	September 25, 1893	Outfielder	Chicago Colts	
Jack Lynch	May 2, 1881	April 19, 1890	Pitcher	Buffalo Bisons (NL), New York Metropolitans, Brooklyn Gladiators	
Jerry Lynch	April 15, 1954	October 2, 1966	Outfielder	Pittsburgh Pirates, Cincinnati Redlegs/Reds	
Mike Lynch (OF)	April 24, 1902	May 5, 1902	Outfielder	Chicago Orphans	
Mike Lynch (P)	June 21, 1904	September 25, 1907	Pitcher	Pittsburgh Pirates, New York Giants	
Thomas Lynch	August 5, 1884	August 5, 1884	Utility player	Chicago White Stockings	
Tom Lynch	August 18, 1884	June 3, 1885	Outfielder	Wilmington Quicksteps, Philadelphia Quakers	
Walt Lynch	July 8, 1922	July 17, 1922	Catcher	Boston Red Sox	
Byrd Lynn	April 16, 1916	October 1, 1920	Catcher	Chicago White Sox	
Fred Lynn	September 5, 1974	October 3, 1990	Outfielder	Boston Red Sox, California Angels, Baltimore Orioles, Detroit Tigers, San Diego Padres	
Jerry Lynn	September 19, 1937	September 19, 1937	Second baseman	Washington Senators	
Lance Lynn	June 2, 2011		Pitcher	St. Louis Cardinals	
Red Lynn	April 25, 1939	October 1, 1944	Pitcher	Detroit Tigers, New York Giants, Chicago Cubs	
Brandon Lyon	August 4, 2001	July 4, 2013	Pitcher	Toronto Blue Jays, Boston Red Sox, Arizona Diamondbacks, Detroit Tigers, Houston Astros, New York Mets	
Russ Lyon	April 21, 1944	May 27, 1944	Catcher	Cleveland Indians	
Al Lyons	April 19, 1944	October 3, 1948	Pitcher	New York Yankees, Pittsburgh Pirates, Boston Braves	
Barry Lyons	April 19, 1986	October 1, 1995	Catcher	New York Mets, Los Angeles Dodgers, California Angels, Chicago White Sox	
Bill Lyons	July 20, 1983	September 30, 1984	Second baseman	St. Louis Cardinals	
Curt Lyons	September 19, 1996	September 29, 1996	Pitcher	Cincinnati Reds	
Denny Lyons	September 18, 1885	July 23, 1897	Third baseman	Providence Grays, Philadelphia Athletics (AA), St. Louis Browns (AA), New York Giants, Pittsburgh Pirates, St. Louis Browns (NL)	
Ed Lyons	September 15, 1947	September 28, 1947	Second baseman	Washington Senators	
George Lyons	September 6, 1920	September 23, 1924	Pitcher	St. Louis Cardinals, St. Louis Browns	
Harry Lyons	August 29, 1887	July 4, 1893	Outfielder	Philadelphia Quakers, St. Louis Browns (AA), New York Giants, Rochester Broncos	
Hersh Lyons	April 17, 1941	April 17, 1941	Pitcher	St. Louis Cardinals	
Pat Lyons	July 21, 1890	August 5, 1890	Second baseman	Cleveland Spiders	
Steve Lyons	April 15, 1985	October 3, 1993	Utility player	Boston Red Sox, Chicago White Sox, Atlanta Braves, Montreal Expos	
Ted Lyons β	July 2, 1923	May 19, 1946	Pitcher	Chicago White Sox	
Terry Lyons	April 19, 1929	April 19, 1929	First baseman	Philadelphia Phillies	
Toby Lyons	April 18, 1890	May 2, 1890	Pitcher	Syracuse Stars (AA)	
Rick Lysander	April 12, 1980	October 1, 1985	Pitcher	Oakland Athletics, Minnesota Twins	
John Lyston	August 29, 1891	June 15, 1894	Pitcher	Columbus Solons, Cleveland Spiders	
Dad Lytle	August 11, 1890	August 28, 1890	Utility player	Chicago Colts, Pittsburgh Alleghenys	
Jim Lyttle	May 17, 1969	October 3, 1976	Outfielder	New York Yankees, Chicago White Sox, Montreal Expos, Los Angeles Dodgers	
