= Gordon Seyfried =

American baseball player (born 1937)

- Pitcher
- Born: July 4, 1937 (age 89); Long Beach, California, U.S.
- Batted: Right Threw: Right

MLB debut
- September 13, 1963, for the Cleveland Indians

Last MLB appearance
- April 28, 1964, for the Cleveland Indians

MLB statistics
- Won–lost record: 0–1
- Earned run average: 0.93
- Strikeouts: 1
- Stats at Baseball Reference

Teams
- Cleveland Indians (1963–1964)

Gordon Clay Seyfried (born July 4, 1937) is an American retired professional baseball player. The former right-handed pitcher spent 12 years as a professional and appeared in five games in Major League Baseball for the 1963 and 1964 Cleveland Indians. The native of Long Beach, California was listed as 6 feet (1.8 m) and 185 pounds (84 kg). He attended Wilson Classical High School and Long Beach City College.

== Baseball career ==
Seyfried was signed by the Detroit Tigers in 1956. In the minor leagues, he won over 100 games, leading the Eastern League in wins in 1958, with 17, while playing for the Lancaster Red Roses. From 1960 to 1962, as a member of the Triple-A Denver Bears, he posted a combined won–lost record of 40–24. On November 27, 1962, Seyfried was traded with fellow hurler Ron Nischwitz to the Cleveland Indians for veteran third baseman Bubba Phillips.

=== MLB tenure ===
After spending the 1963 minor league season at Triple-A, Seyfried made his MLB debut on September 13, 1963, against the Los Angeles Angels at Dodger Stadium, only a few miles up the freeway from his Long Beach home town. Relieving Early Wynn, Seyfried pitched one inning and allowed two hits and no runs before being lifted for a pinch hitter; Cleveland prevailed in 12 innings, 7–6, with Gary Bell getting the win. In the third and final game of his 1963 late-season trial, Seyfried received his only big-league start. Facing the Kansas City Athletics at Municipal Stadium, Seyfried allowed only one earned run in 52/3 innings, but departed the game trailing 2–1; when Cleveland could not rally from behind, Seyfried was tagged with the loss in his only MLB decision. In 1964, Seyfried worked in two scoreless April relief appearances for the Indians, before returning to Triple-A.

Seyfried retired as a pitcher in mid-1967, and spent the remainder of that season as the manager of the Gulf Coast Indians, Cleveland's Rookie-level affiliate.
