= Ron Nischwitz =

American baseball player (born 1937)

- Pitcher
- Born: July 1, 1937 (age 89); Dayton, Ohio, U.S.
- Batted: Both Threw: Left

MLB debut
- September 4, 1961, for the Detroit Tigers

Last MLB appearance
- September 19, 1965, for the Detroit Tigers

MLB statistics
- Win–loss record: 5–8
- Earned run average: 4.21
- Strikeouts: 58
- Stats at Baseball Reference

Teams
- Detroit Tigers (1961–1962, 1965); Cleveland Indians (1963)

Ronald Lee Nischwitz (born July 1, 1937) is an American former Major League Baseball (MLB) relief pitcher who played from 1961 to 1963, and again in 1965, for the Detroit Tigers and Cleveland Indians. A switch-hitter, he threw left-handed, was 6 ft 3 in (1.91 m) tall and weighed 205 lb (93 kg).

Before playing professional baseball, he attended Fairview High School and then Ohio State University. Signed by the Tigers as an amateur free agent in 1958, Nischwitz made his big league debut on September 4, 1961, against the Baltimore Orioles. He pitched two perfect innings, striking out three batters. He played in a total of six games in his rookie year, going 0–1 with a 5.56 ERA.

In 1962, Nischwitz was the Tigers' most used reliever, appearing in 48 games. He went 4–5 with a 3.90 ERA. In 64 2/3 innings, he struck out only 28 batters but proved to be a solid hitter, collecting five hits — including a triple — in 12 at-bats, for a .417 batting average. After the season, he was traded by the Tigers with Gordon Seyfried to the Indians for Bubba Phillips.

Nischwitz played in only 14 big league games in 1963, going 0–2 with a 6.48 ERA. He did not play in the majors in 1964.

1965 was Nischwitz's final big league season. Before the season began, he was purchased by the Tigers from the Indians. He appeared in 20 games for the Tigers, going 1–0 with a 2.78 ERA — one of the best ERAs on the team. He played his final game on September 19.

Overall, Nischwitz 5–8 with a 4.21 ERA in 88 games. In 115 1/3 innings, he walked 48 batters and struck out 68. He hit .278 in 18 career at-bats.

Following his playing career, he served as the head coach of Dayton's Wright State University baseball team from 1975 to 2004. In 2007 he was inducted into the American Baseball Coaches Association Hall of Fame.
