= Jim Lawrence (baseball) =

Canadian baseball player (1939–2025)

- Catcher
- Born: February 12, 1939; Hamilton, Ontario, Canada
- Died: January 8, 2025 (aged 85); Caledonia, Ontario, Canada
- Batted: Left Threw: Right

MLB debut
- May 30, 1963, for the Cleveland Indians

Last MLB appearance
- June 1, 1963, for the Cleveland Indians

MLB statistics
- Games played: 2
- Total chances: 4
- Errors: 1
- Stats at Baseball Reference

Teams
- Cleveland Indians (1963)

James Ross Lawrence (February 12, 1939 – January 8, 2025) was a Canadian professional baseball catcher who appeared in two major league games for the 1963 Cleveland Indians. Although he did not have a plate appearance, he had three putouts behind the plate and committed one error. The native of Hamilton, Ontario, batted left-handed, threw right-handed, stood 6 feet 1 inch (1.85 m) tall and weighed 185 pounds (84 kg) (13 stone, 3 pounds).

Lawrence's minor league baseball career spanned seven seasons, from 1958 to 1964. He played his entire career with the Indians organization.

Lawrence died on January 8, 2025, at the age of 85.
