= Bob Lipski =

American baseball player (born 1938)

- Catcher
- Born: July 7, 1938 (age 87); Scranton, Pennsylvania, U.S.
- Batted: Left Threw: Right

MLB debut
- April 28, 1963, for the Cleveland Indians

Last MLB appearance
- May 1, 1963, for the Cleveland Indians

MLB statistics
- Batting average: .000
- At bats: 1
- Hits: 0
- Stats at Baseball Reference

Teams
- Cleveland Indians (1963)

Robert Peter Lipski (born July 7, 1938) is an American former Major League Baseball catcher who played for the Philadelphia Phillies and the Cleveland Indians.

== Formative years ==
Born in Scranton, Pennsylvania on July 7, 1938, Bob Lipski was a graduate of that city's Technical High School.

== Baseball career ==
Originally signed by the Philadelphia Phillies in 1956, Lipski was drafted from them by the Cleveland Indians in the 1962 rule 5 draft. He played in just two games for that team in 1963, going hitless in one at bat, before being returned to the Phillies, ending his major league career.

During the summer of 1962, he was "named to the International Baseball League all-star team," according to The Scranton Times.

== Public service career and family ==
Following his baseball career, Lipski married, had two children, and worked as a Pennsylvania State Trooper in Dunmore, Pennsylvania and in his hometown of Scranton.

During the summer of 1994, Lipski traveled to Poland, where he worked with civic leaders in multiple communities to establish Little League Baseball programs for Polish children.
