= H. Gabriel Murphy =

American sports executive

- Born: January 8, 1903; Hogansburg, New York, U.S.
- Died: November 1, 2001 (aged 98); Washington, D.C., U.S.
- Occupation(s): Insurance executive (H. Gabriel Murphy & Co.); Major League Baseball team owner
- Years active: 1950–1984 (baseball)

Henry Gabriel Murphy (January 8, 1903 – November 1, 2001) was an American businessman, sportsman and Major League Baseball club owner. From June 1950 through April 1984, he was a minority stockholder in the Washington Senators/Minnesota Twins franchise of the American League. After October 1955, Murphy became the largest individual shareholder in the team, although he never gained majority control.

A longtime insurance executive in Washington, D.C., Murphy was known for his battles with club president and majority owner Calvin Griffith over management of the Senators, and especially over Griffith's decision to relocate the club to Minneapolis-St. Paul at the close of the 1960 baseball season. Murphy was a native of Hogansburg, New York, who attended Georgetown University in Washington, where he starred in football, earned a law degree, and served as athletics director (1930–41).

== Minority owner of Washington Senators ==
Ironically, Murphy had purchased his stake in the Washington franchise in 1950 as an ally of Calvin's uncle, Baseball Hall of Famer Clark Griffith, who was then the team's president. Griffith was the Senators' largest shareholder, but with his holdings at only 44 percent, he fell short of majority ownership. Murphy's 40.4 percent share in the team previously was George Richardson's but, a year after Richardson died in 1948, his estate sold his baseball holdings to New York businessman John J. Jachym, bypassing Clark Griffith. When Jachym attempted to obtain a seat on the Senators' board of directors and a voice in the team's operations, however, he was thwarted by Griffith and the board. Jachym then sold his stock to Murphy in June 1950 for a price later reported as $625,000.

Griffith considered Murphy, then 47, a friendly partner; Murphy had dealt with the owner over the years when he negotiated a lease on Griffith Stadium for use by the Georgetown Hoyas varsity football team. Murphy's investment ended any threat to Griffith's control of the Senators; in return he was reported to have acquired right of first refusal should the club be put up for sale.

== Opposed team's move to Twin Cities ==
By the time Clark Griffith died at age 85 in October 1955, he had acquired an additional eight percent of the team's stock and owned 52 percent of its shares. His nephew Calvin and niece Thelma Griffith Haynes each inherited half of their uncle's majority stake and together they assumed control of the franchise, with Calvin becoming the Senators' president and de facto general manager. He and Murphy soon began to clash over the floundering team's management. The Senators' front office included three of Griffith's brothers, plus Thelma and her husband, Joe Haynes. The Senators lost over 90 games for five consecutive seasons (1955–59) and finished in last place for three successive seasons (1957–59). Murphy wanted Griffith to relinquish his general manager duties and hire an outsider to run the team's baseball operations; Griffith flatly refused. In protest, Murphy resigned as the Senators' treasurer and member of the board of directors in 1956.

Their disagreements intensified when Griffith began entertaining offers from cities wishing to lure the Senators from Washington. In the autumn of 1960, when after protracted negotiations with Twin Cities officials the team finally moved, Murphy filed suit in federal court seeking to block the transfer. He battled Griffith in court for eight years and tried unsuccessfully to have a summons served on Griffith in the District of Columbia. When the Twins won the 1965 American League pennant (with Murphy still the club's largest minority shareholder), the threat kept Griffith from attending the flag-clinching game, played at D.C. Stadium September 26 against the expansion Washington Senators club created to assuage official Washington for Griffith's 1960 abandonment. Murphy did gain one benefit over Griffith due to his forced absence, he was able to celebrate with the Twins in the pennant winning clubhouse.

== Sold Twins' shares in 1984 ==
Murphy held onto his share of the Twins, however, and returned to the club's board of directors in 1977. In April 1984, he agreed to sell his stake to the Tampa Bay Baseball Group for $11.5 million. When Griffith sold his family's majority interest to Carl Pohlad in August 1984, Pohlad also acquired Murphy's former shares from the Tampa Bay consortium.

Murphy was active in Washington charities and organizations, at one time serving as president of the National Symphony Orchestra Association and vice president of the Washington Hospital Center and the Columbia Lighthouse for the Blind. He retired from his insurance business (H. Gabriel Murphy and Company) in 1994, and died at age 98 on November 1, 2001, from a heart ailment at his Washington home.

== Personal ==
On Murphy's death, he was survived by two daughters, seven grandchildren, and five great-grandchildren. He was predeceased by his wife, Marie McIntyre Murphy. He was the maternal grandfather of Motley Fool co-founders Tom and David Gardner.
