= Frank McIntyre (military officer) =

United States Army general (1865–1944)

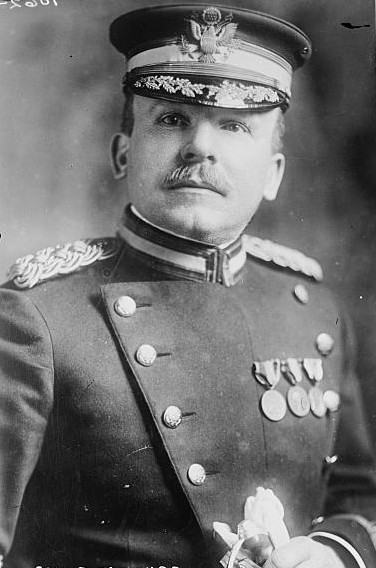
- Frank McIntyre
- Born: January 5, 1865; Montgomery, Alabama
- Died: February 16, 1944 (aged 79); Miami Beach, Florida
- Burial place: Arlington National Cemetery
- Military career
- Allegiance: United States of America
- Branch: United States Army
- Service years: 1886–1929
- Rank: Major General
- Service number: 0-7
- Commands: Bureau of Insular Affairs
- Conflicts: Spanish–American War; Philippine–American War; World War I
- Awards: Legion of Honor; Order of the Bath; Distinguished Service Medal

Frank McIntyre (January 5, 1865 – February 16, 1944) was an American military officer who served for many years as Chief of the Bureau of Insular Affairs, responsible for federal administration of the Philippines and Puerto Rico.

== Early life and ancestry ==
Frank McIntyre was born to Dennis and Mary Gaughan McIntyre in Montgomery, Alabama. He had three brothers, James, John, and Cornelius Patrick, and four sisters, Mary, Catherine, Ellen, and Nora. Dennis McIntyre came to America in the 1850s and was a railroad car inspector for the West Point and Alabama Railroad. He settled first in Georgia, where he met his wife, and the family had moved to Alabama by 1860, when they are listed in census records. Dennis is listed on the roster of the Montgomery County Home Guard, CSA, in 1864. His wife Mary was originally from Crossmolina County Mayo, where many Gaughans reside. She moved to Georgia in the 1850s to join her brother, Patrick Gaughan. Patrick later moved to Camden, Arkansas. He enlisted in the 33rd Arkansas Infantry Regiment, CSA, in 1863. The surname McIntyre is a Scottish Highland name (also spelled MacIntyre) that means "son of the carpenter" or wright. The Gaelic original is Mac an-T Saoir. McIntyres were originally to be found in Lorne where they possessed the lands of Glenoe from the 13th century until the early 19th century. According to family tradition, the MacIntyres/McIntyres came originally from the Hebrides. In the 13th century, they sailed from their ancestral home carrying a white cow, and settled on the mainland at Glen Noe by Ben Cruachan. On the mainland the MacIntyres/McIntyres were hereditary foresters to the lords of Lorne. For many years, they paid the Campbells of Glenorchy a symbolic rent of a white calf and a snowball for their Glen Noe lands. During the 18th century, the rent was commuted to cash, then progressively raised. Donald, the 4th MacIntyre chief, could not pay so he emigrated to Canada. His brother and successor Captain Donald MacIntyre the fifth chief, tried but failed to make ends meet and the Glen Noe lands were lost two hundred years ago, in 1808. The present Clan Chief is Donald MacIntyre of Glenoe.

Frank McIntyre was a grandson of James and Norah McIntyre of The Brockey, Killybegs County Donegal, Ireland. His grandmother was Norah Cannon, the daughter of Dennis and Jane Cannon (née McBraerty) of Killybegs, County Donegal. Her sister Mary Cannon married Thomas Murrin of Croaghlin (1804–1882) Banagh barony, Killybegs, County Donegal, their daughter Jane Murrin (1829–1903) married Charles Dawson Lea (1819–1883) in 1851. Their son John Edward Dawson Lea (1859–1929) married Hannora McIntyre his cousin, who died on 10 October 1938. John and Hannorah lived at Rathmines, Dublin, and Aileach House, Killybegs, County Donegal, where his cousin and sister-in-law Agnes McIntyre also lived and where she died on 5 February 1990, aged 92. Agnes and Hannorah McIntyre were first cousins of General Frank McIntyre and Judge Patrick McIntyre. On the distaff side their first cousin was Séamus Hegarty, D.D. an Irish Roman Catholic prelate, who served as Bishop of Raphoe from 1982 to 1994, then as Bishop of Derry from 1994 to 2011. Agnes and Hannorah were the daughters of John and Mary McIntyre née Carr, and like Frank the grandchildren of James and Nora McIntyre, Nora being a Cannon.

The Cannons are descended from two of Ireland's most renowned Kings: Conn of the Hundred Battles and Niall of the Nine Hostages. The O'Cannons have been described as "Ancient Princes of Tir Connaill" and "Valiant Chiefs". However their 350-year dynasty in Tir Connaill ended in 1250. Their ancient territory would seem to have been Tir Aeda (now the barony of Tirhigh) after the deaths of Rory O' Canannain and his son Niall O'Canannain in 1250, the sept declined greatly in power. Brian O'Neill died ten years later in 1260, he had supported an O'Canannain claimant to Tir Conaill i.e. to the Kingdom of Tir Conaill (Tirconnell). The personal name Canannain is a diminutive of Cano meaning 'wolf cub'. Canannain was fifth in descent from Flaithbertach mac Loingsig (died 765), high-king of Ireland; they were the descendants of Neill of the Nine Hostages (Irish: Niall Noigiallach) who died c. 405 by his son, Conall Gulban who gave his name to Tir Conaill, the Land of Conall, now County Donegal.

Ui Canannain was the ancestral name of the Cannons and Tir Connaill (all of County Donegal and part of County Londonderry) was the "Land of the Cannons". By the early 17th century the name Ui Canannain had been anglicised to O'Cannon. Further anglicisation took place during the Penal laws in the late 18th and early 19th centuries and the name in County Donegal became Cannon. In the early 1880s, there were just 200 families bearing the Cannon surname living in County Donegal, who were mainly tenant farmers. The Cannons/O'Canannains, were of the ancient sept of Cenell Conaill, a branch of the northern Ui Neill and descend from Ruaidri ua Canannain (died 30 November 950) King of Cenel Conaill, and grandson of Canannain, who flourished in the second half of the 9th century. One of Neill's most famous descendants was George Washington, the first President of the United States of America. The site of the ancient seat of the O'Canannains was near Letterkenny the largest town of County Donegal, which is said on good authority to represent the hillside of the O'Cannons (English translation).

== Education ==
Frank McIntyre was educated in public and private schools in Montgomery and at The University of Alabama from 1880 to 1882. While a student in Tuscaloosa, his professors noted his talents and recommended him for his home district's vacancy to West Point. McIntyre successfully passed a competitive examination and was enrolled at the United States Military Academy in the Fall of 1882. The son of Irish immigrants never forgot his roots. In a 1938 letter to his classmates at West Point, McIntyre reflected "I can never forget the unsolicited kindness of these professors at the University [of Alabama] to a young boy without influence and with not the slightest obligation on their part. Their action reflects one phase of the spirit of Alabama. How could I forget it?" McIntyre graduated from West Point in 1886, ranked tenth in his class. A classmate and roommate of McIntyre was General John J. Pershing.

== Military career ==
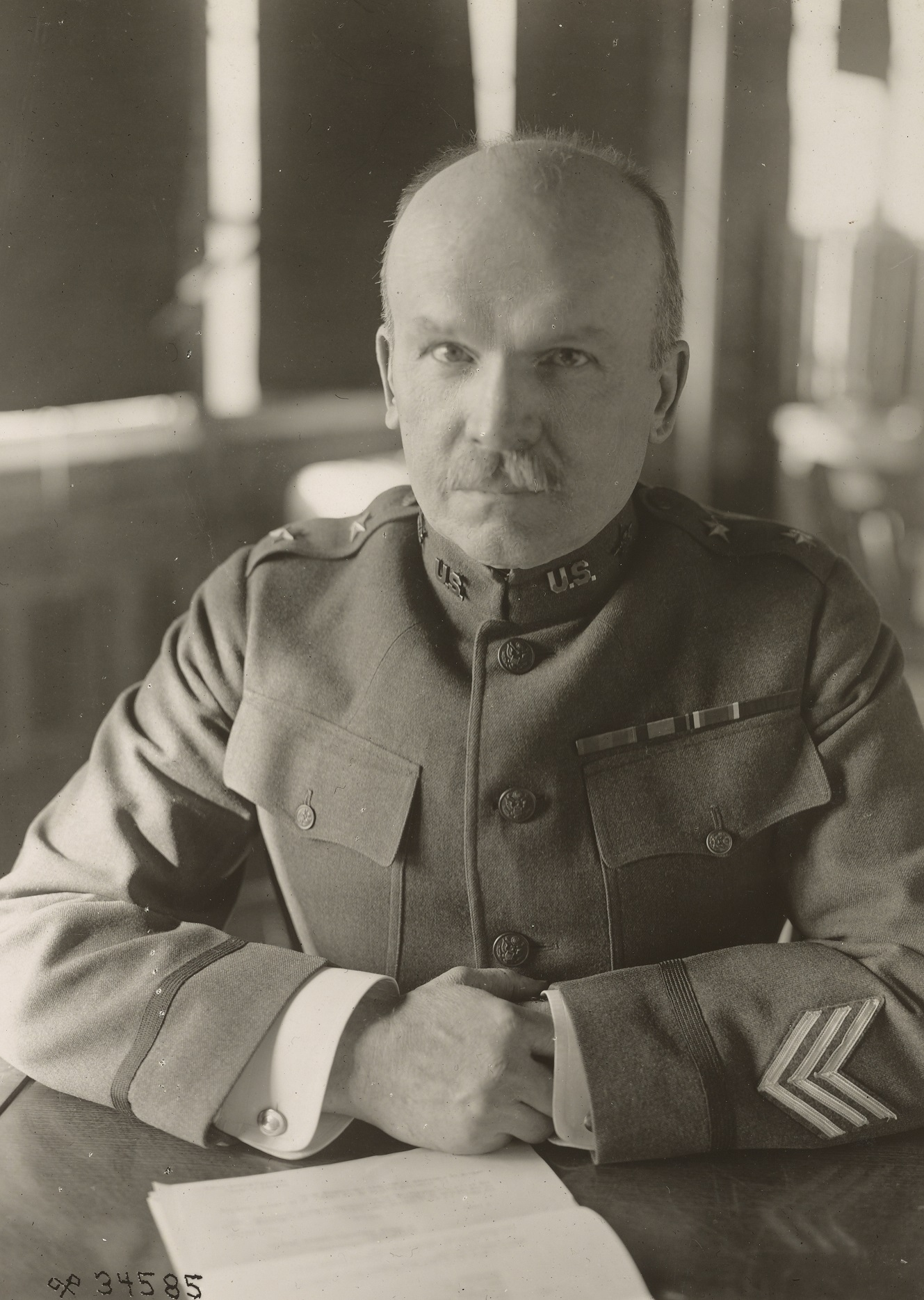
Major General McIntyre in early 1919

McIntyre entered the United States army as a second lieutenant in the 19th Infantry Regiment, serving in various ranks until he attained that of brigadier-general in 1912. He saw duty at different posts, chiefly on the Mexican border, until the war with Spain, in which he participated in the Puerto Rico Campaign in 1898. McIntyre served in the Philippines from 1899 to 1902, after which he served with the general staff.

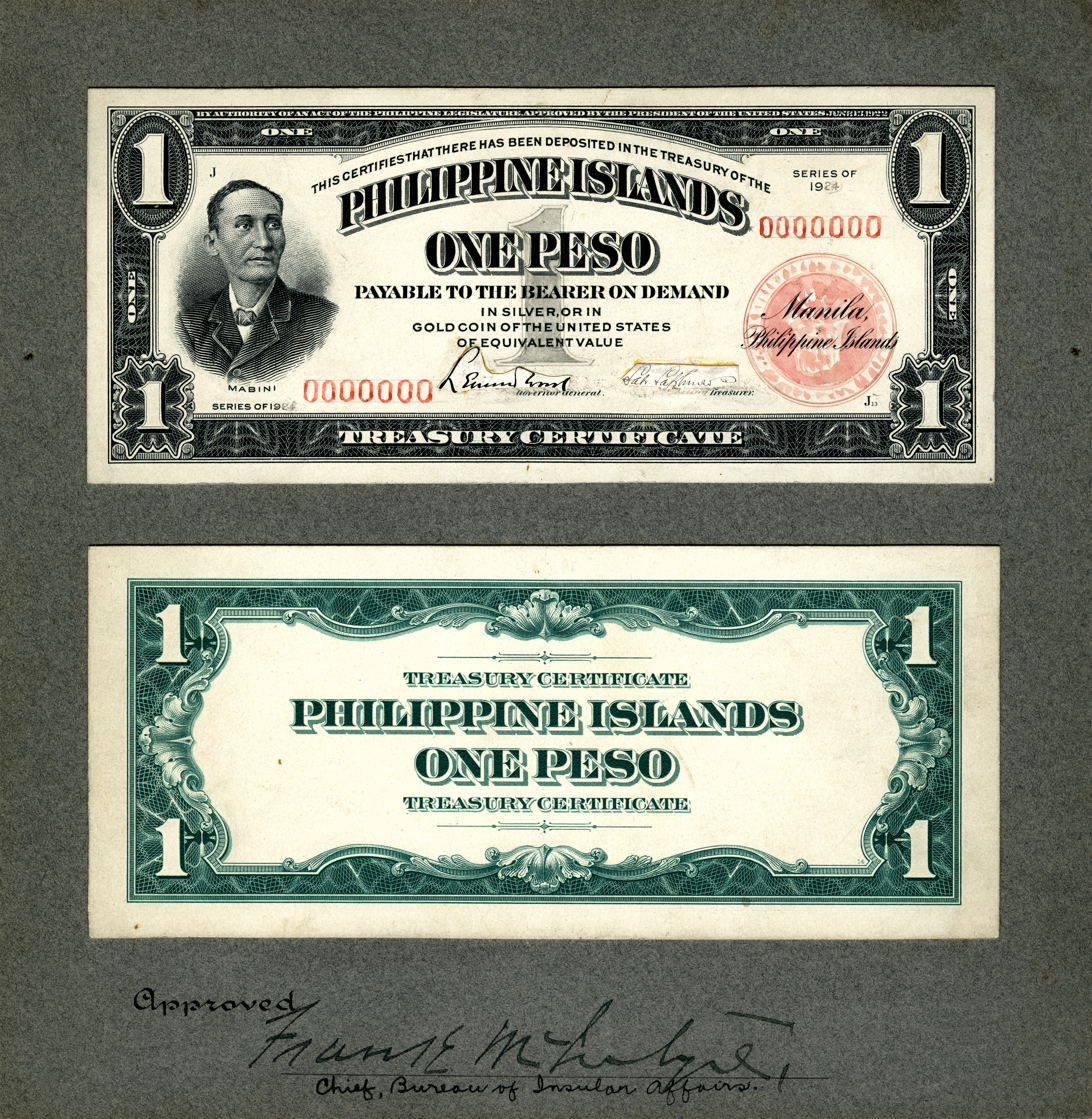
Design proof for a 1924 Philippine one peso note, approved by McIntyre.

McIntyre was attached to the Bureau of Insular Affairs in 1905 and became its Chief in 1912, relieving General Clarence Ransom Edwards. During the War in Europe, he was assistant chief of staff with the rank of major-general. McIntyre served as long-time Chief of the Bureau of Insular Affairs and played a significant role in the governance of the Philippines and Puerto Rico throughout this period. With respect to Puerto Rico, McIntyre wavered on the wisdom of granting United States citizenship to Puerto Ricans but ultimately supported the Jones–Shafroth Act of 1917. At times, McIntyre had strained relations with other officials in Puerto Rico, such as U.S. District Judge and fellow Alabama native Peter J. Hamilton during the 1910s and Governor E. Mont Reily during the 1920s. In his 2007 book Planting the American Flag: Twelve Men Who Expanded the United States Overseas, author Peter C. Stuart devoted an entire chapter to the career of Gen. McIntyre and his leadership of the Bureau of Insular Affairs. With respect to McIntyre's administration of the Philippines and Puerto Rico, Stuart noted " While others more assertive or egoistic imprinted on the protectorates their personal marks, McIntyre left no memorial....yet he wielded perhaps greater sway upon the United States' little empire than all his more visible imperial colleagues." Stuart credits Gen. McIntyre's stewardship over the Bureau of Insular Affairs as having been critical to its survival, and noting that within a decade following his retirement the Bureau was turned over to the Department of the Interior and disbanded in 1939. Reflecting upon the Bureau's demise, Stuart noted "An era of American imperial administration – in many ways the McIntyre era – had ended."

McIntyre retired from the Army in 1929.

== In retirement ==
Following retirement Gen. McIntyre served for several years as the Philippine trade commissioner in Washington and lived on Massachusetts Avenue. In this role he lobbied on behalf of the islands' interests. He later purchased and maintained a home in Montgomery, Alabama on South Hull Street, from which he helped oversee the large plantation, cotton business, and real estate interests of his older brothers Jim and John McIntyre, who established McIntyre Brothers in 1878. The main plantation, named "Killybegs" after the ancestral hometown, is located in Ramer, Montgomery County, Alabama. At its zenith the property comprised 7600 contiguous acres. Approximately 1500 acres of Killybegs remain in the McIntyre family as of 2026.

== Personal life ==
McIntyre was married in 1892 in Dallas to the former Marie Dennett, a native of New Orleans who grew up primarily in Texas. Marie Dennett was the daughter of James Wilson Dennett (1831–1888) a native of Huntsville, Alabama, and Marie Dufilho Dennett, who was from an old New Orleans Creole family. James Dennett was an assistant quartermaster for the Confederacy in New Orleans prior to the Federals taking the city in 1862, and then served in similar roles primarily in East Tennessee and SW Virginia for the remainder of the war. Marie's maternal great-grandfather Christoval Toledano (1790–1869) was a sugar merchant and the son of Manuel Toledano y Valenzuela (1763–1806), a Spanish military official who arrived in New Orleans in the 1790s. Christoval served in Plauche's Battalion in the War of 1812 and fought at the Battle of New Orleans. In the 1850s he built the Tullis-Toledano Manor for his second wife. The McIntyres were the parents of six children, who grew up primarily in Washington, DC: Frank Jr. James, Edward, Margaret, Marie, and Nora. James continued the military tradition established by his father and retired as a major general in the United States Air Force. He served as the legislative liaison for the Air Force to Congress in the late 1940s, and is credited with helping establish the Air Force as an independent branch of the military through his efforts to help pass the National Security Act of 1947. McIntyre's descendants include great-grandsons David and Tom Gardner, co-founders of The Motley Fool, and great-granddaughter Georgena Terry, the pioneering women's bicycle designer who founded Terry Precision Cycling. In 2025 Terry was inducted into the U.S. Bicycling Hall of Fame for her achievements.

== Awards ==
In large part due to his service as executive assistant to the chief of staff in World War I McIntyre's awards and decorations included the only French Legion of Honour, and he was invested as a Knight Commander of the Order of the Bath from Great Britain. He also received the Grand Cordon of the Striped Tiger from China and the Czechoslovak War Cross. He also received the Army Distinguished Service Medal, the citation for which reads:

The President of the United States of America, authorized by Act of Congress, July 9, 1918, takes pleasure in presenting the Army Distinguished Service Medal to Major General Frank McIntyre, United States Army, for exceptionally meritorious and distinguished services to the Government of the United States, in a duty of great responsibility during World War I. As Executive Assistant to the Chief of Staff, General McIntyre's breadth of view and sound judgment have contributed materially to the formulation and carrying out of policies essential to the operation of the military establishment.

== Death and legacy ==
He died on February 16, 1944, at age 79, while on a vacation trip to Miami Beach, Florida. He and his wife Marie, who died in 1935, are buried at Arlington National Cemetery, in Arlington, Virginia.
