= John Jachym =

American businessman (1918–2005)

John J. Jachym
- Born: May 9, 1918; Youngstown, Ohio, U.S.
- Died: May 10, 2005 (aged 87); Charlottesville, Virginia, U.S.
- Resting place: Arlington National Cemetery
- Occupations: Businessman, philanthropist, sportsman

John James Jachym (/ˈjɑːkɪm/ YAW-kim) (May 9, 1918 – May 10, 2005) was an American businessman, philanthropist, and sportsman. He was briefly (from December 23, 1949, through June 22, 1950) a club owner in Major League Baseball as the second largest shareholder in the Washington Senators of the American League. Later in his career, he was active in Republican Party politics and an important figure in (and a rare honorary member of) the Professional Golfers' Association.

== Early life and career ==
Jachym was born in Youngstown, Ohio. He graduated from high school in South Dayton, New York, and earned a bachelor's degree in journalism in 1940 from the University of Missouri. As a young newspaper reporter working in Jefferson City, Missouri, Jachym became acquainted with legendary St. Louis Cardinals executive Branch Rickey, who became a key influence in his life. At the age of 22, Jachym became a part-time scout for Rickey's Cardinals.

However, Jachym's baseball and journalism careers were interrupted by World War II. In 1941, Jachym enlisted in the United States Marine Corps and rose to the field rank of captain. He saw combat at New Guinea, New Britain and Guadalcanal, earning a Silver Star. At war's end he relocated to Jamestown, New York, became a successful businessman, and—still in his 20s—purchased the local minor league baseball franchise, the Jamestown Falcons of the Class D Pennsylvania–Ontario–New York League (PONY League). When he in turn sold the Falcons to the Major League Detroit Tigers, he joined the Tiger front office as assistant director of minor league operations.

== Rebuffed as part owner of Senators ==
In August 1948, George Richardson died. Six years before, he had inherited the second-largest bloc of Senators' stock from his brother, William, a Philadelphia grain dealer. In 1949, representatives of the Richardson estate put its 40.4 percent (amounting to 7,851 shares) interest in the Washington club up for sale. Jachym, backed by Hugh Grant, an oil magnate from Bradford, Pennsylvania, purchased the outstanding stock for $70 per share ($549,570), becoming the second-largest shareholder in the Senators after the team's iconic president, Clark Griffith, a Baseball Hall of Fame pitcher who owned 44 percent of the club.

Griffith, then 80 years of age, had controlled the fate of the Senators since 1912, first as field manager, then as club president. He was furious at the sale, believing that he had the right of first refusal on Richardson's stock. Jachym, who had hoped to become general manager or treasurer of the Senators, was denied any executive role by the Griffith-dominated board of directors. Although his attorney was given a seat on the board, Jachym was refused that position as well. His suggestions—such as purchasing the Triple-A Buffalo Bisons to serve as the top farm team in Washington's notoriously weak minor league system, and opening a ticket office in downtown Washington, D.C.—were ignored.

Finally, in June 1950, almost six months to the day when he acquired his stake, Jachym sold his shares to Washington insurance executive H. Gabriel Murphy, an ally of Griffith's, at a profit estimated at between $80,000 and $100,000. Murphy then sold Clark Griffith the additional seven percent of stock that would give Griffith full control of the team, in exchange for the right to buy Griffith's stock should it ever come up for sale. (Griffith's nephew Calvin inherited the club in 1955, moved it to Minneapolis–St. Paul after the 1960 season, and sold it to Carl Pohlad in 1984.)

== Business career ==
Jachym was involved in another ill-fated baseball venture later in 1950. Partnering with American tennis star Bobby Riggs, he organized a post-season barnstorming tour of 32 North American cities featuring 36 big-league stars, playing in an American League vs. National League format. Fan response and ticket sales in the tour's first two cities, Montreal and Toronto, showed promise. But heavy rains forced cancellation of those games, and continued poor weather conditions—including a hurricane that struck during its planned visit to Miami—dogged the series. It was halted after 13 games, with Jachym and Riggs losing an estimated $66,000.

Out of baseball, but still only 32 years of age, Jachym then forged a business career as an investment banker and, later, top executive with companies based in Chicago and San Diego. He was a key financial advisor during the successful 1980 Presidential campaign of Ronald Reagan, but declined the opportunity to return to Washington as a member of Reagan's administration. He remained in the sporting world, however, as an active supporter of the PGA, acting as the official American observer of multiple Ryder Cup competitions and serving on the PGA Board of Directors from 1990 to 1992. In 1994, he was elected an honorary member of the PGA, one of only six men ever selected.

In retirement, Jachym maintained residences in Virginia, Western New York, and Florida. On May 10, 2005, the day after his 87th birthday, he died from cancer in Charlottesville, Virginia, and was interred in Arlington National Cemetery.
