= CytRx =

Biopharmaceutical research company in Los Angeles, California, USA

CytRx Corp.
- Type: Public
- Traded as: Nasdaq: CYTR; Russell Microcap Index component
- Headquarters: United States
- Key people: Steven Arthur Kriegsman (president and CEO)
- Website: www.cytrx.com

CytRx Corp. is a biopharmaceutical research and development oncology company based in Los Angeles, California.

The CytRx oncology pipeline includes clinical trials involving their lead drug aldoxorubicin. Aldoxorubicin (formerly INNO-206) is a modified form of doxorubicin, the popular anthracycline chemotherapeutic agent known as "red death".

Anthracyclines are a class of drugs that are among the most commonly used agents in the treatment of cancer. Doxorubicin, the first anthracycline to gain approval, has demonstrated efficacy in a wide variety of cancers including breast cancer, lung cancer, sarcomas, and lymphomas. However, doxorubicin is associated with side effects such as myelosuppression, gastrointestinal disorders, mucositis, stomatitis, cumulative cardiotoxicity and extravasation.

== General ==
CytRx plans to expand its pipeline of oncology candidates at its laboratory facilities in Freiburg, Germany, based on novel linker technologies that can be utilized with multiple chemotherapeutic agents and may allow for greater concentration of drug at tumor sites.

=== Aldoxorubicin ===
Aldoxorubicin (formerly INNO-206) is a tumor-targeted doxorubicin conjugate. Specifically, it is the (6-Maleimidocaproyl) hydrazone of doxorubicin. Essentially, this chemical name describes doxorubicin (DOXO) attached to an acid sensitive linker (EMCH).

Completed preclinical and clinical trials (see below) indicate that this novel agent has attributes that improve on native doxorubicin including reduction of adverse events, improvement in efficacy and the ability to reach the tumor more quickly.

== Stock promotion ==
In 2014 CytRx was involved in a stock promotion scheme, paying DreamTeamGroup US$65,000 to write at least 13 articles that appeared on Seeking Alpha, Forbes.com, Motley Fool, and Cheat Sheet. The articles carried no conflict of interest disclosure, and were reviewed and edited by CytRx management. The stock price doubled following the articles. The articles and author profile pages (including pseudonyms) were removed after investigation by CNNMoney. A class action lawsuit has been filed against CytRx.

The events leading to CytRx lawsuits were revealed by a Seeking Alpha author named Richard Pearson who was shorting the CytRx company stock and the "short attack" was revealed by another Seeking Alpha author PhD. who wrote about the science of aldoxorubicin and revealed the motives behind Richard Pearson's article to short the company's stock. The second Seeking Alpha article pointed to a financial motive for the negative article and that the author Richard Pearson took a short position in CytRx company stock 3 days before he published his article about CytRx.

== See also ==
- Galena Biopharma, a former subsidiary of CytRx
