= Galena Biopharma =

American pharmaceutical company

Galena Biopharma, Inc.
- Formerly: RXi Pharmaceuticals
- Type: Public
- Traded as: Nasdaq: GALE
- Industry: Biotechnology
- Founded: 2006; 20 years ago
- Defunct: December 29, 2017
- Fate: Acquired by SELLAS Life Sciences Group
- Headquarters: San Ramon, California, United States
- Key people: Mark Schwartz (CEO)
- Products: NeuVax
- Revenue: $7.4 million (2014)
- Number of employees: 60 (March 2014)
- Website: www.sellaslifesciences.com

Galena Biopharma, Inc. (originally RXi Pharmaceuticals) was a publicly traded pharmaceutical company based in San Ramon, California. The company was founded in Worcester, Massachusetts. In 2011, it moved to Oregon, and in 2015 moved to San Ramon, California. Mark Schwartz was the company's president and chief executive officer. As of December 29, 2017, the company was acquired by Sellas Life Sciences Group Ltd. through a reverse merger transaction. Galena Biopharma was renamed to Sellas Life Sciences Group, Inc. (Nasdaq: SLS).

== History ==
In November 2006, Argonaut Pharmaceuticals, Inc. changed the name to RXi Pharmaceuticals Corporation. RXi was a subsidiary of CytRx Corp., which provided $15 million in financing in April 2007. RXi was founded in part by Nobel Prize winner Craig Mello. In September 2007, RXi signed a licensing deal with TriLink Biotechnologies, a competitor in the RNA interference (RNAi) field, in which RXi would pay TriLink to use three of TriLink's technologies.

In March 2011, the company announced the planned acquisition of Arizona-based Apthera, Inc. for $7 million. The acquisition included the breast cancer drug NeuVax. In June 2011, NeuVax was approved by the United States Food and Drug Administration to start a stage three clinical trial.

In September 2011, the company separated its cancer therapies division. It was renamed Galena Biopharma Inc and moved to Lake Oswego, Oregon. RXi became a subsidiary of Galena and retained RNAi technologies. RXi Pharmaceuticals remained in Massachusetts as a publicly traded company. In January 2014, Galena bought Mills Pharmaceuticals. In April 2014, the company headquarters moved to Portland.

In November 2011, the company partnered with Genentech to combine drugs from each company for a cancer treatment.

=== Leadership ===
In March 2011, president and CEO Noah Beerman were replaced by Mark Ahn, and in August 2014, Ahn resigned and was replaced by Mark Schwartz. On January 31, 2017, Galena announced the resignation of Mark Schwartz effective that day, and reported in the same press release that it would be exploring strategic alternatives to maximize shareholder value going forward.

=== Stock ===
RXi went public in March 2008. CytRx retained 49% ownership of RXi's stock and gave shares of RXi to existing shareholders. Trading began on the Nasdaq market on March 12, 2008, under the ticker symbol of RXII. Fidelity Investments invested $8.5 million in the company in May 2008, followed by a $25 million private-equity investment by Yorkville in February 2009. In 2010, RXi received a National Institutes of Health grant of $600,000. By August 2010, the company had 30 employees. In April 2011, RXi raised about $12 million from a stock offering and received $580,000 in grants from the National Institutes of Health. The company reported a loss of $11.5 million loss for 2011.

In November 2012, an anonymous internet report caused Galena stock to decline. The company filed a lawsuit claiming the report was false and attempted to manipulate the stock. In 2014, Galena's involvement in a fraudulent stock promotion scheme was exposed. On February 1, 2014, analyst Matt Gravitt published an article that revealed Galena had paid MissionIR, DreamTeam brand, to promote Galena's stock. Galena's stock fell 20% following this revelation that received a heated response, and was one of the three most read articles in Seeking Alpha's history. Over the next few weeks, more revelations came out and the company admitted their stock promotion relationship and insider selling. Galena then disclosed that the SEC was investigating their relationship with The DreamTeam Group. By March 2014, five lawsuits were filed against Galena and several of its officers alleging that the company used misleading articles to boost stock prices. Motley Fool, discussing the 23% stock price drop during March 2015, noted there was stock dilution from the offering and also that Abstral's sales were below Galena's estimates from late 2013. Discussing the Motley Fool article, Portland Business Journal also noted the ongoing insider-trading lawsuits as a factor in the stock price. A few days later, Zacks Investment Research said Galena could be a "great candidate" to beat its earnings. In response, Galena's CEO said there were many positive aspects to the company, and that the lawsuits weren't a worry as they should get covered under Directors and officers liability insurance. The company moved to San Ramon, California, in the Bay Area in 2015.

=== Stock promotion scandal ===
The revelation that Galena was engaging in fraudulent stock promotion without adequate disclosure led to the investigation of other biotech companies who engaged in similar activities. Richard Pearson, an investor who went undercover to investigate the stock promotion firms, wrote an exposé on DreamTeam and its ties to articles about Galena, CytRx, and other companies on media websites. In April 2017, the Securities and Exchange Commission announced enforcement actions against 27 individuals and entities behind various alleged stock promotion schemes. Fraud charges were filed against three public companies, seven stock promotion or communications firms, and two company CEOs; also on this hit list are six individuals and nine writers.

=== Merger with Sellas Life Sciences ===
In August 2017, Galena Biopharma Inc. announced a merger "with privately-held oncology company Sellas Life Sciences Group Ltd. in an all-stock transaction." Galena Biopharma was now known as Sellas Life Science Group. The newly merged companies focused on the development of novel treatments for cancer.

== Products ==
Galena acquired the experimental breast cancer drug NeuVax in 2011 and are currently in phase II trials to combine the drug with Genentech's Herceptin.

In 2013, Galena began selling its first developed drug, an analgesic for cancer pain named Abstral Sublingual.

Anagrelide controlled-released (GALE-401) was approved by the FDA for phase III clinical trials for the treatment of essential thrombocytosis in December 2016.

GALE-301 and GALE-302 are immunotherapies in phase I and II trials for ovarian and breast cancers.
