= Christian Magoon =

- Born: Green Bay, Wisconsin
- Education: Wheaton College
- Occupations: Entrepreneur, author, motivational speaker
- Website: www.amplifyetfs.com

Christian Magoon is an American entrepreneur, author, speaker and business executive, best known for being CEO of Amplify ETFs He specializes in exchange-traded funds.

== Background ==
In 2013, his Twitter profile was recognized as a Top 10 investment expert to follow on the site by The Wall Street Journal. In 2012, ETF Database, a leading ETF research provider, named Magoon a "Top Five ETF Expert To Follow On Twitter." In 2011, Financial Planning magazine dubbed him an "ETF Pioneer." In 2008, he was named one of "Five People To Watch In The U.S. ETF Industry" by Institutional Investor. Magoon regularly contributes to leading financial sites including the NASDAQ, Seeking Alpha, Motley Fool, Index Universe, Financial Advisor Magazine and ETF Daily News. He is a contributor to The Wall Street Journal's "The Experts", a panel on wealth management.

He is regularly quoted in the media and participates in a variety of investment conferences annually as a speaker, moderator and panellist. Magoon has participated in the ringing of the opening bell to begin the trading day at the NYSE Euronext multiple times. Magoon has been featured by Fox Business, Bloomberg Radio, The Wall Street Journal, MarketWatch, TheStreet, The New York Times and CNBC.

He holds a Bachelor of Arts in communications and a Master of Arts from Wheaton College in Illinois.

== Career ==
Magoon launched Amplify Investments and Amplify ETFs in February 2016. IBUY differentiates itself from other consumer discretionary and retail-focused ETFs in its peer group by holding only companies that generate 70 percent or more of their revenue from online sales. For example, IBUY's portfolio is more than 87 percent unique versus the largest consumer discretionary ETF.

In September 2016, Amplify acquired YieldShares LLC, and has since launched the Amplify YieldShares Prime 5 Dividend ETF (PFV) and the Amplify YieldShares CWP Dividend and Option Income ETF (DIVO).

In his early career, Magoon served as President of Claymore Securities (now Guggenheim Investments), where he led the firm's product development, distribution and marketing efforts. Magoon built one of the fastest growing ETF businesses in the country, gathering more than $3 billion in AUM in three years. He has introduced many aspects of the field to the American market, including the first frontier markets, solar energy, timber, BRIC, multi-asset income and suite of China-focused ETF's.

Before forming Amplify ETFs and Amplify Investments to bring innovative, opportunity-specific exchange traded products to market, he founded Magoon Capital in 2010. Launching over fifty ETF's to date, Magoon has been referred to as an "ETF Jedi" by one industry publication. In 2013, he formed a new ETF Sponsor, YieldShares. YieldShares will focus on ETF's for income-starved investors, with its flagship YYY product amassing over $125 million in assets as of January 2017.
