= Benjamin Minor (baseball) =

Owner of the Washington Senators

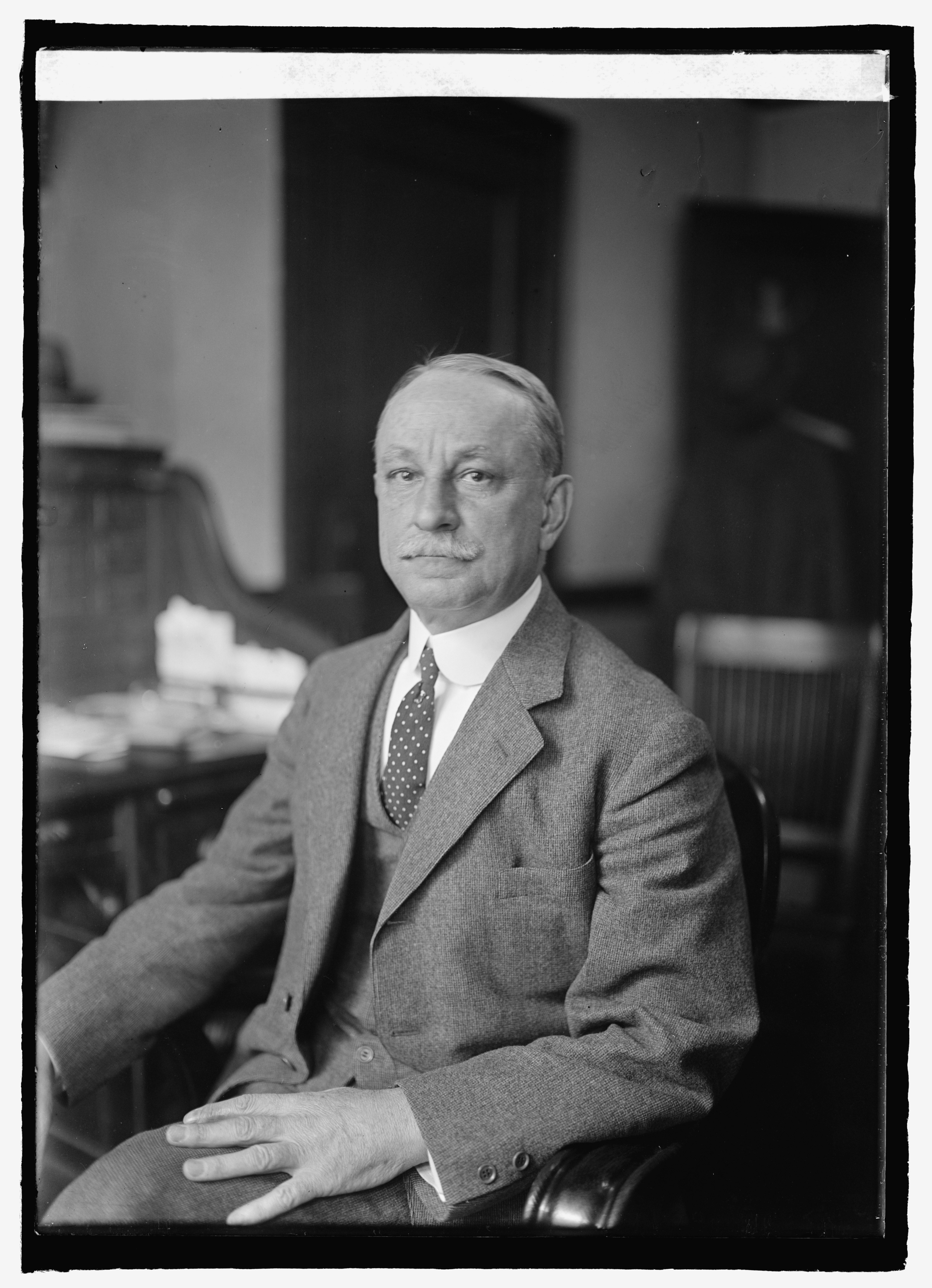
Benjamin Minor (baseball)

Benjamin S. Minor (1864/1865-1946) was the principal owner and president of the Washington Senators from 1912 to 1919.

Born in Comorn, Virginia; Minor graduated from the University of Virginia and became a prominent attorney in the Washington area. In 1904, he joined a syndicate headed by Washington Star owner Thomas C. Noyes that bought the Senators from Fred Postal. When Noyes died late in the 1912 season, the board named Minor as his successor.

Minor immediately came into conflict with manager Clark Griffith; he was not as inclined to give Griffith as free a hand in baseball matters as Noyes had been. Minor and the other owners were not willing to let Griffith spend money to improve the team on the field. The Senators had risen to second in Griffith's first year as manager, but hadn't been able to sustain that pace. By 1919, however, Minor felt he could no longer devote attention to the Senators, and sold his stake to Griffith and Philadelphia grain magnate William Richardson in late 1919. Richardson allowed Griffith to vote his shares as well, effectively giving Griffith controlling interest.

Minor served as receiver for The Washington Post in 1933. He died in Washington on September 27, 1946 after a long illness at the age of 81.
