= Totalise plc v Motley Fool Ltd =

2001 UK legal case

Totalise plc v Motley Fool Ltd was libel case in concerned with identifying users on web forums. In 2001, it represents one of the earliest reported cases in England and Wales relating to libel on the internet.

The internet service provider Totalise (which became part of Madasafish in 2006) sued Motley Fool because a user named "Zeddust" made negative comments about Totalise on the Motley Fool website. Motley Fool were forced to reveal the identity of Zeddust under Section 10 of the Contempt of Court Act.
