= NeuVax =

Vaccine

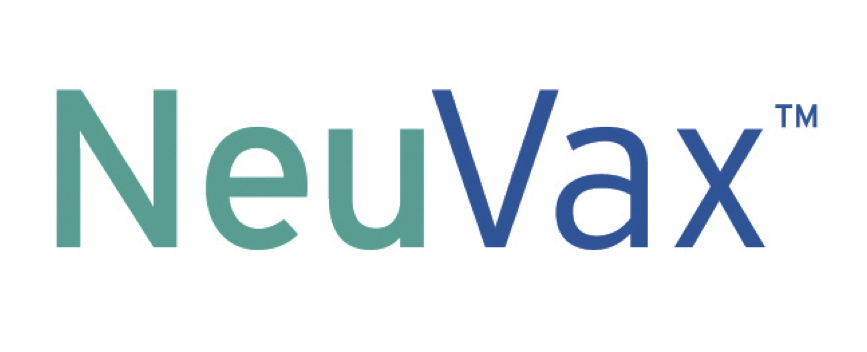

NeuVax is a peptide vaccine aimed at preventing or delaying the recurrence of breast cancer in cancer survivors who achieve remission after standard of care treatment (e.g., surgery, radiation, chemotherapy). The product's developer is the US biotechnology company Galena Biopharma.

== The product ==
NeuVax is the E75 synthetic peptide initially isolated from HER2/neu proto-oncogene (being HER2/neu p366-379) combined with the immune adjuvant, granulocyte macrophage colony stimulating factor (rhGM-CSF from yeast).

NeuVax in Phase II showed effectiveness in early-stage, node-positive breast cancer with low-to-intermediate HER-2 expression, where the five-year recurrence rate dropped from 26% to 6%. The vaccine is now in a Phase III study called PRESENT, short for (Prevention of Recurrence in Early-Stage Node-Positive Breast Cancer with Low to Intermediate HER2 Expression with NeuVax Treatment (ClinicalTrials.gov identifier NCT01479244). This study is taking place under an FDA Special Protocol Assessment.

NeuVax works by harnessing the patient's own immune system to seek out and attack any residual cancer cells that express HER2/neu, a protein associated with tumors in breast, ovarian, pancreatic, colon, bladder and prostate cancers.

== Clinical trials ==
NeuVax has been tested as adjuvant treatment in nearly 200 breast cancer patients over a total of 5 years, and has shown to be safe and effective in Phase 2 trials. As a result, two additional NeuVax trials registered or underway are: (1) a 700 patient Phase 3 trial for FDA approval - not yet recruiting and (2) a 300 patient Phase 2 trial studying the combination of NeuVax and Herceptin® (trastuzumab).
