= Aldoxorubicin =

Medication

Identifiers
- IUPAC name: N-[[1-[(2S,4S)-4-[(2R,4S,5S,6S)-4-Amino-5-hydroxy-6-methyloxan-2-yl]oxy-2,5,12-trihydroxy-7-methoxy-6,11-dioxo-3,4-dihydro-1H-tetracen-2-yl]-2-hydroxyethylidene]amino]-6-(2,5-dioxopyrrol-1-yl)hexanamide
- CAS Number: 1361644-26-9
- PubChem CID: 71300693
- ChemSpider: 7986464
- UNII: C28MV4IM0B
- KEGG: D10383
- ECHA InfoCard: 100.244.879

Chemical and physical data
- Formula: C_{37}H_{42}N_{4}O_{13}
- Molar mass: 750.758 g·mol^{−1}
- 3D model (JSmol): Interactive image
- SMILES: C[C@H]1[C@H]([C@H](C[C@@H](O1)O[C@H]2C[C@@](CC3=C(C4=C(C(=C23)O)C(=O)C5=C(C4=O)C=CC=C5OC)O)(C(=NNC(=O)CCCCCN6C(=O)C=CC6=O)CO)O)N)O
- InChI: InChI=1S/C37H42N4O13/c1-17-32(46)20(38)13-27(53-17)54-22-15-37(51,23(16-42)39-40-24(43)9-4-3-5-12-41-25(44)10-11-26(41)45)14-19-29(22)36(50)31-30(34(19)48)33(47)18-7-6-8-21(52-2)28(18)35(31)49/h6-8,10-11,17,20,22,27,32,42,46,48,50-51H,3-5,9,12-16,38H2,1-2H3,(H,40,43)/t17-,20-,22-,27-,32+,37-/m0/s1; Key:OBMJQRLIQQTJLR-FRTGXRTISA-N

Aldoxorubicin (INNO-206) is a tumor-targeted doxorubicin conjugate in development by CytRx. Specifically, it is the (6-maleimidocaproyl) hydrazone of doxorubicin. Essentially, this chemical name describes doxorubicin attached to an acid-sensitive linker (N-ε-maleimidocaproic acid hydrazide, or EMCH).

The proposed mechanism of action is as follows:

1. After administration, aldoxorubicin rapidly binds endogenous circulating albumin through the EMCH linker.
2. Circulating albumin preferentially accumulates in tumors, bypassing uptake by other non-specific sites including heart, bone marrow and gastrointestinal tract.
3. Once albumin-bound aldoxorubicin reaches the tumor, the acidic environment of the tumor causes cleavage of the acid sensitive linker.
4. Free doxorubicin is released at the site of the tumor.

== Clinical trials and FDA approvals ==
Aldoxorubicin was used in clinical trials to treat various forms of cancer, particularly soft-tissue sarcomas. Results from the sole phase III trial of Aldoxorubicin were considered disappointing as they did not meet their primary endpoint. As of May 2025, aldoxorubicin has not been approved by the FDA for use in treating cancer.
