= George H. Richardson =

American baseball executive (died 1948)

George H. Richardson (sometimes George M. Richardson; died August 13, 1948) was an American Major League Baseball team owner.

== Career ==
Richardson was a transportation and warehousing executive. He was vice president of the Philadelphia Chamber of Commerce. He was a grain dealer from Philadelphia. At the time of his death, he was vice president of the Merchants Warehouse Company and the Girard Warehouse Company. He was treasurer of the National Portland Cement Company and president of the Philadelphia Export Company.

Richardson's twin brother William was vice president of the Washington Senators. He was a minority owner of the Washington Senators from the death of his brother on June 10, 1942, until his own death. He held 40.4 percent of club stock, the second-largest bloc of shares behind team president Clark Griffith's 44 percent. He had been Griffith's "silent partner" since the two teamed up to purchase the franchise after the 1919 season. Richardson later served as the Senators' treasurer.

== Personal life ==
Richardson died on August 13, 1948, aged 70, at his home in Pitman, New Jersey.
