= Wall Street Survivor =

Finance education website

- Lesson screenshot
- Website: www.wallstreetsurvivor.com
- Current status: Active

Wall Street Survivor is an educational website that teaches the basics of finances. Launched in 2005, it uses gamification to teach concepts of the stock market, investing, and general financial planning. The website also provides articles, videos, courses, and other content.

== History ==
Rajat Paharia originally created Wall Street Survivor as a stock investing game that allowed users to practice their knowledge by investing in stocks using fake money. The current version was launched as an add-on to the site in 2012 and presented at the Finovate conference in San Francisco, California the same year. The website was gamified using software on the Bunchball Nitro platform.

== Overview ==
Wall Street Survivor has been referred to as Codecademy for learning about money. The site uses videos, article, and other resources to teach people about personal finance, debt, and investing. Lessons are taught using gamification with users completing missions to get to the next step. Users earn badges and rewards and can also play in fantasy leagues to challenge their friends. The site teaches without using complicated financial jargon.

Wall Street Survivor offers its education through partner websites, mobile applications, and educational institutions including Yale University, Seeking Alpha, The Motley Fool, and Daily Finance. The site generates revenue from advertising and referrals.

== Reception ==
The website has been seen in publications including Business Insider, TechCrunch, The Globe and Mail, and Forbes.
