= List of Minnesota Twins managers =

In its 108-year history, the Minnesota Twins baseball franchise of Major League Baseball's American League has employed 31 managers. The duties of the manager include team strategy and leadership on and off the field. Eight of these team managers have been "player-managers", all during the Washington Senators era; specifically, they managed the team while still playing for it.

The Minnesota franchise began its life as the Washington Senators in Washington, D. C., where they played from their inception in 1901 to 1960. In the early twentieth century, the Senators were managed consecutively by three future members of the National Baseball Hall of Fame, bookended by Bucky Harris, who managed the team from 1924 to 1928 and again from 1935 to 1942. Walter Johnson managed the team for four seasons from 1929 to 1932, and he was followed by Joe Cronin, who led for the next two seasons (1933–1934). In 1960, the American League awarded an expansion franchise to Minneapolis, Minnesota; however, owner Calvin Griffith moved his team to Minnesota, and Washington was awarded the expansion team instead. Thus, the Minnesota Twins began play at Metropolitan Stadium in Bloomington, Minnesota the following year, during the tenure of manager Cookie Lavagetto, and played at the Hubert H. Humphrey Metrodome in downtown Minneapolis from 1982 to 2009. Under manager Ron Gardenhire, the team moved to Target Field beginning in the 2010 season.

Seven managers have taken the franchise to the postseason, with Gardenhire leading them to five playoff appearances, the most in their franchise history. Two managers have won World Series championships with the franchise: Bucky Harris, in the 1924 World Series against the New York Giants; and Tom Kelly, in the 1987 World Series against the St. Louis Cardinals and 1991 against the Atlanta Braves. Harris is also the longest-tenured manager in their franchise history, with 2,776 games of service in parts of 18 seasons between 1924 and 1954; he is followed by Kelly, who managed 2,386 games over 16 seasons from 1986 to 2001. The manager with the highest winning percentage in team history is Billy Martin, who managed the team in 1969 and achieved a record of 97–65 (.599). Conversely, the manager with the lowest winning percentage is Malachi Kittridge, whose winning percentage of .059 was achieved with a record of 1–16 in the first half of 1904. Kittridge's tenure is also the shortest in team history.

== Table key ==
WPct	Winning percentage: number of wins divided by number of games managed
PA	Playoff appearances: number of years this manager has led the franchise to the playoffs
PW	Playoff wins: number of wins this manager has accrued in the playoffs
PL	Playoff losses: number of losses this manager has accrued in the playoffs
WS	World Series: number of World Series victories achieved by the manager
† or ‡	Elected to the National Baseball Hall of Fame (‡ denotes induction as manager)
§	Member of the Twins Hall of Fame

== Managers ==
#^{[a]}	Image	Manager	Years	Wins	Losses	WPct	PA	PW	PL	WS	Ref
1		Jim Manning	1901	61	73	.455	—	—	—	—	
2		Tom Loftus	1902–1903	104	169	.381	—	—	—	—	
3		Malachi Kittridge	1904	1	16	.059	—	—	—	—	
4		Patsy Donovan	1904	37	97	.296	—	—	—	—	
5		Jake Stahl	1905–1906	119	182	.395	—	—	—	—	
6		Joe Cantillon	1907–1909	158	297	.347	—	—	—	—	
7		Jimmy McAleer	1910–1911	130	175	.426	—	—	—	—	
8		Clark Griffith^{†}	1912–1920	693	646	.518	—	—	—	—	
9		George McBride	1921	80	73	.523	—	—	—	—	
10		Clyde Milan	1922	69	85	.448	—	—	—	—	
11		Donie Bush	1923	75	78	.490	—	—	—	—	
12		Bucky Harris^{‡}	1924–1928	429	334	.562	2	7	7	1	
13		Walter Johnson^{†}	1929–1932	350	264	.570	—	—	—	—	
14		Joe Cronin^{†}	1933–1934	165	139	.543	1	1	4	0	
—		Bucky Harris^{‡}	1935–1942	558	663	.457	—	—	—	—	
15		Ossie Bluege	1943–1947	375	394	.488	—	—	—	—	
16		Joe Kuhel	1948–1949	106	201	.345	—	—	—	—	
—		Bucky Harris^{‡}	1950–1954	349	419	.454	—	—	—	—	
17		Chuck Dressen	1955–1957	116	212	.354	—	—	—	—	
18		Cookie Lavagetto	1957–1961	271	384	.414	—	—	—	—	
19		Sam Mele	1961–1967	522	431	.546	1	3	4	0	
20		Cal Ermer	1967–1968	145	129	.529	—	—	—	—	
21		Billy Martin	1969	97	65	.599	1	0	3	0	
22		Bill Rigney	1970–1972	208	184	.531	1	0	3	0	
23		Frank Quilici	1972–1975	280	287	.494	—	—	—	—	
24		Gene Mauch	1976–1980	378	394	.490	—	—	—	—	
25		Johnny Goryl	1980–1981	34	38	.472	—	—	—	—	
26		Billy Gardner	1981–1985	268	353	.432	—	—	—	—	
27		Ray Miller	1985–1986	109	130	.456	—	—	—	—	
28		Tom Kelly^{§}^{[b]}	1986–2001	1140	1244	.478	2	16	8	2	
29		Ron Gardenhire^{[c]}	2002–2014	1068	1039	.507	6	6	21	0	
30		Paul Molitor^{†}	2015–2018	305	343	.471	1	0	1	0	
31		Rocco Baldelli	2019–2025	527	505	.511	3	3	8	0	
32		Derek Shelton	2026-present	77	85	.475	0	0	0	0	

== Footnotes ==
- ^{a} #: running total of the number of Twins managers. Thus, any manager who has two or more separate terms is only counted once.
- ^{b} Tom Kelly won the Manager of the Year Award in 1991.
- ^{c} Ron Gardenhire won the Manager of the Year Award in 2010.
- ^{d} Paul Molitor won the Manager of the Year Award in 2017.
