= Clark Griffith =

American baseball player, manager, and owner (1869–1955)

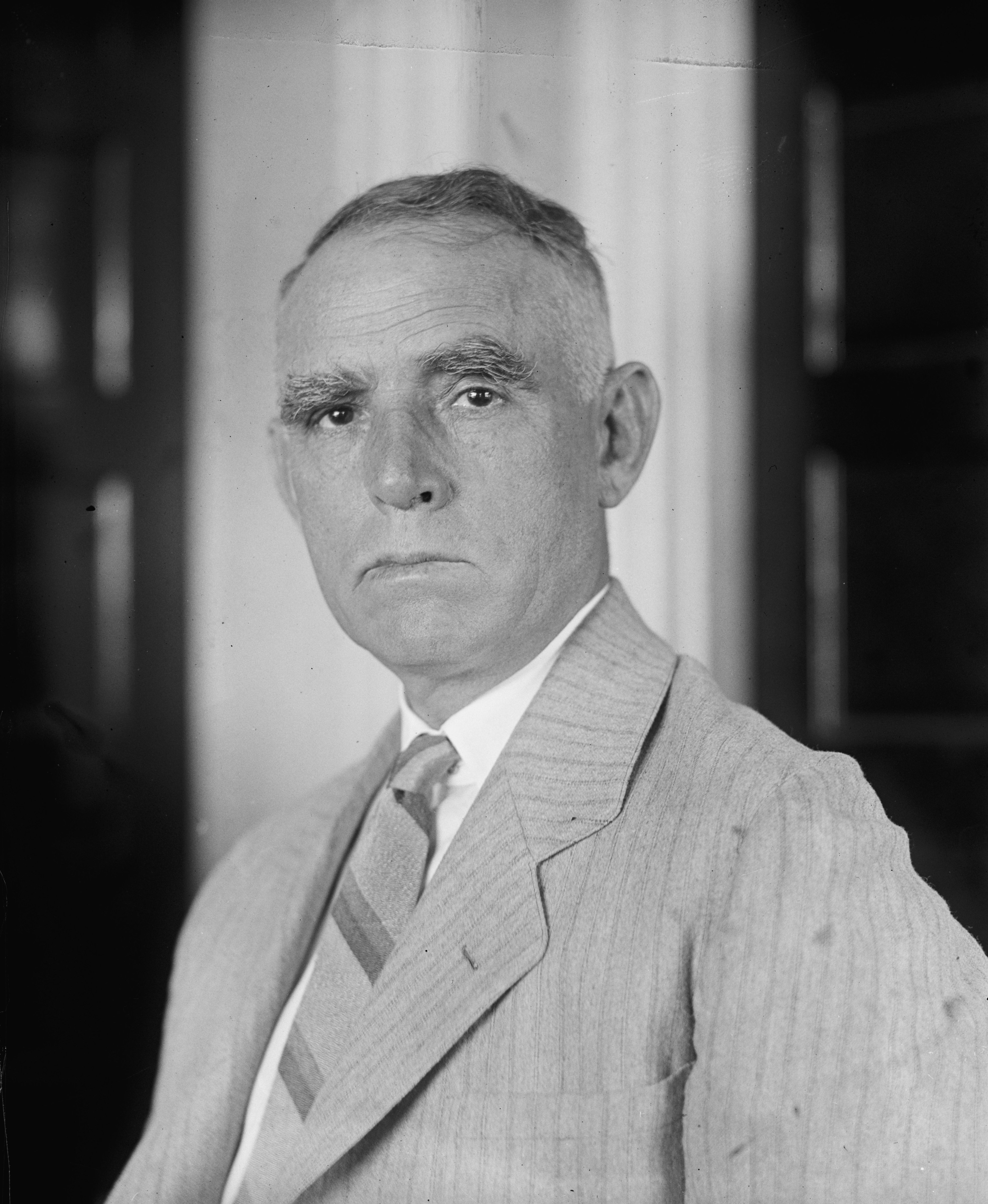
- Pitcher / Manager / Owner
- Born: November 20, 1869; Clear Creek, Missouri, U.S.
- Died: October 27, 1955 (aged 85); Washington, D.C., U.S.
- Batted: Right Threw: Right

MLB debut
- April 11, 1891, for the St. Louis Browns

Last MLB appearance
- October 7, 1914, for the Washington Senators

MLB statistics
- Win–loss record: 237–146
- Earned run average: 3.31
- Strikeouts: 955
- Managerial record: 1,491–1,367–59
- Winning %: .522
- Stats at Baseball Reference

Teams
- As player: St. Louis Browns (1891); Boston Reds (1891); Chicago Colts / Orphans (1893–1900); Chicago White Stockings (1901–1902); New York Highlanders (1903–1907); Cincinnati Reds (1909–1910); Washington Senators (1912–1914); As manager: Chicago White Stockings (1901–1902); New York Highlanders (1903–1908); Cincinnati Reds (1909–1911); Washington Senators (1912–1920); As owner: Washington Senators (1920–1955)

Career highlights and awards
- MLB ERA leader (1898); Washington Nationals Ring of Honor; Chicago Cubs Hall of Fame

Member of the National

Baseball Hall of Fame
- Induction: 1946
- Election method: Old-Timers Committee

Clark Calvin Griffith (November 20, 1869 – October 27, 1955), nicknamed "the Old Fox", was an American Major League Baseball (MLB) pitcher, manager and team owner. He began his MLB playing career with the St. Louis Browns (1891), Boston Reds (1891), and Chicago Colts/Orphans (1893–1900). He then served as player-manager for the Chicago White Stockings (1901–1902) and New York Highlanders (1903–1907).

He retired as a player after the 1907 season, remaining manager of the Highlanders in 1908. He managed the Cincinnati Reds (1909–1911) and Washington Senators (1912–1920), making some appearances as a player with both teams. He owned the Senators from 1920 until his death in 1955. Sometimes known for being a thrifty executive, Griffith is also remembered for attracting talented players from the National League to play for the upstart American League when the Junior Circuit was in its infancy.

Griffith has the second-most ties by a manager in MLB history, with 59. He trails only Connie Mack, who has 76 ties and holds the record for managing the most games in MLB history, with a total of 7,755 games, 4,838 more than Griffith. Additionally, 25 managers have managed more games than Griffith’s 2,917, making the incidence of ties in his managerial career significantly higher than any other manager in Major League history.

Griffith was elected to the National Baseball Hall of Fame in 1946.

== Early life ==
Clark Calvin Griffith was born on November 20, 1869, in Clear Creek, Missouri, to Isaiah and Sarah Anne Griffith. His parents were of Welsh ancestry. They had lived in Illinois before Clark Griffith's birth. The family took a covered wagon west toward the Oklahoma Territory. Along the way, the family encountered hungry and disenchanted people returning from the Oklahoma Territory, so they decided to settle in Missouri. Griffith grew up with five siblings, four of them older.

When Griffith was a small child, his father was killed in a hunting accident when fellow hunters mistook him for a deer. Sarah Griffith struggled to raise her children as a widow, but Clark Griffith later said that his neighbors in Missouri had been very helpful to his mother, planting crops for her and the children. Fearing a malaria epidemic that was sweeping through the area, the Griffith family moved to Bloomington, Illinois.

A childhood incident taught him about the money side to baseball, Griffith recalled. When he was 13, he and a few other young boys had raised $1.25 to buy a baseball. They sent one of the boys 12 miles on horseback to make the purchase. The ball burst the second time that it was struck. Griffith later found out that the boy who purchased the ball only spent a quarter, keeping the leftover dollar. At the age of 17, Griffith had made $10 pitching in a local baseball game in Hoopeston, Illinois.

== Professional career ==
=== Minor leagues ===
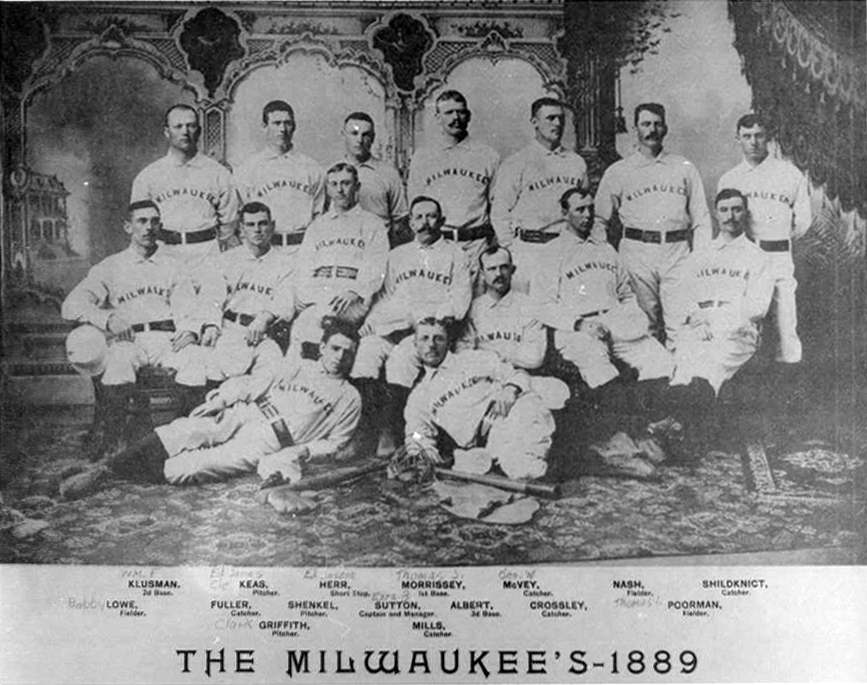
The 1889 Milwaukee Creams, Griffith is front row on the left

Griffith broke into organized baseball late in the 1887 with the local Bloomington club in the Central Interstate League. The following year, during an exhibition game against the Milwaukee Creams of the Western Association, Griffith so impressed Milwaukee manager Jim Hart that he offered the 18-year old a contract at $225 a month. Clark pitched for Milwaukee for three seasons before Charlie Comiskey convinced him to join the major leagues.

=== St. Louis Browns and Boston Reds (1891) ===
Griffith entered the American Association in 1891, pitching 226 1/3 innings and going 11-8 for Comiskey's St. Louis Browns. He was released in July of that year after developing a sore arm, and joined the Boston Reds later that season. After the 1891 season, the Association disbanded and he was left looking for new work.

=== Back to the minors ===
Griffith spent the next two seasons moving from independent minor league club to minor league club, playing in Tacoma, Washington, Missoula, Montana, and Oakland, California. The leagues were unstable; he had 30 wins for Oakland when the club disbanded in August 1893, and Griffith performed on stage in Wild West variety shows in San Francisco's Barbary Coast red-light district before signing with the Chicago Colts in early September.

=== Chicago Colts / Orphans (1893–1900) ===
Griffith began the following season with the Colts, and spent the rest of his playing career in the major leagues. In 1893, the pitchers box was moved back; it had been 55 feet from home plate and was moved to the modern distance of 60 feet, six inches. Following that change, offensive numbers increased across baseball and many pitchers had to adjust their approaches. Cap Anson was the player-manager of the Colts during Griffith's tenure and he utilized a rotation of only three starting pitchers. Just before Griffith's arrival on the team, pitcher Bill Hutchison had thrown more than 600 innings in a single season for Anson, which may have contributed to a decline in Hutchison's career. Griffith tried a new pitch to increase his longevity. By modifying the grip of a curveball, he threw a pitch similar to the screwball that Christy Mathewson had developed. He also often scuffed balls with his spikes or rubbed them in the grass.

In 1894, Griffith began a string of six consecutive seasons with 20 or more victories, compiling a 21–14 record and 4.92 earned run average (ERA). Griffith lowered his ERA over the following years to a low of 1.88 in 1898, the lowest mark in the league.

== Managerial career ==
=== Chicago White Stockings (1901–1902) ===
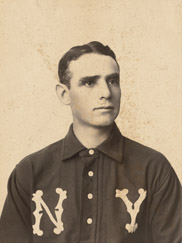
Griffith in 1903

When Ban Johnson, a longtime friend, announced plans to form the American League, Griffith was one of the ringleaders in getting National League players to jump ship. Using the cover of his post as vice president of the League Protective Players' Association (a nascent players' union), Griffith persuaded 39 players to sign on with the new league for the 1901 season. Griffith himself signed on with the Chicago White Stockings as player-manager. He won 20 games for the final time in his career and led the White Stockings to the first AL pennant with an 83–53 record.

=== New York Highlanders (1903–1908) ===
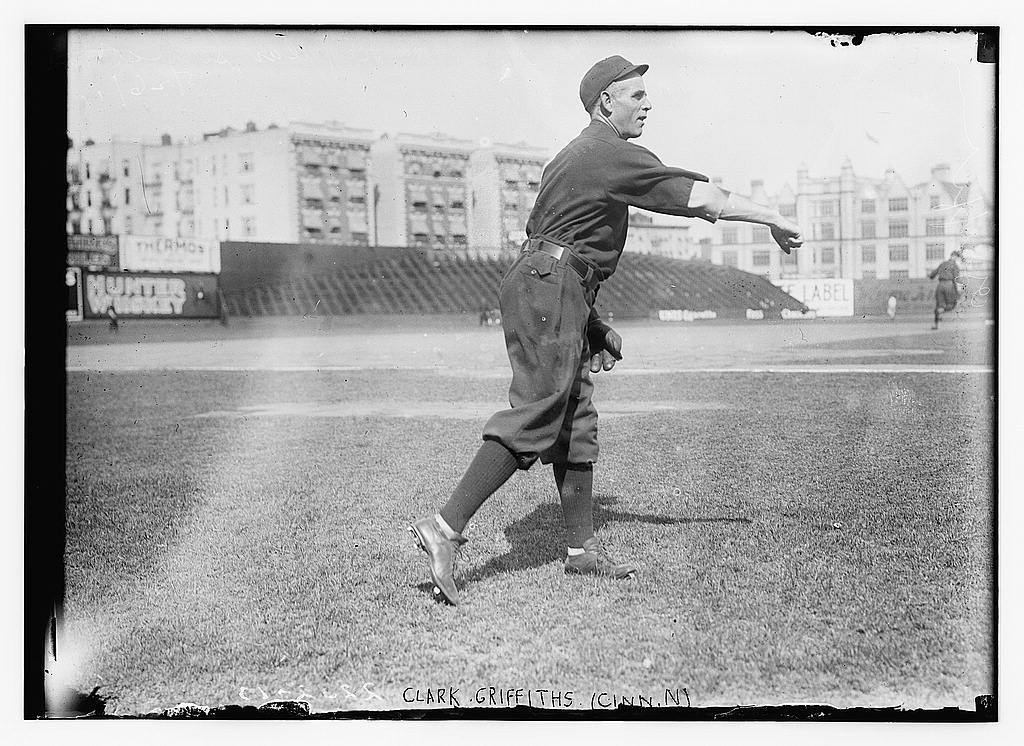
Griffith at Hilltop Park, 1909

At Johnson's suggestion, Griffith left Chicago in 1903 to take over as manager of the New York Highlanders. The Highlanders had just moved from Baltimore, and Johnson knew that for the league to be successful, it needed a strong franchise in the nation's biggest city. Griffith's last year as a regular player was 1907 after he nearly suffered a breakdown from overwork in April 1907.

After a falling-out with the Highlanders' ownership, Griffith was fired during the 1908 season. The team had started strong, but the team's pitching faltered as the season progressed and Griffith was criticized for trading away Jimmy Williams in exchange for a disappointing prospect.

He made brief appearances as a player for the Reds (1909–1910) and Senators (1912, 1913 and 1914).

=== Cincinnati Reds (1909–1911) ===
Griffith returned to the National League as manager of the Cincinnati Reds in 1909.

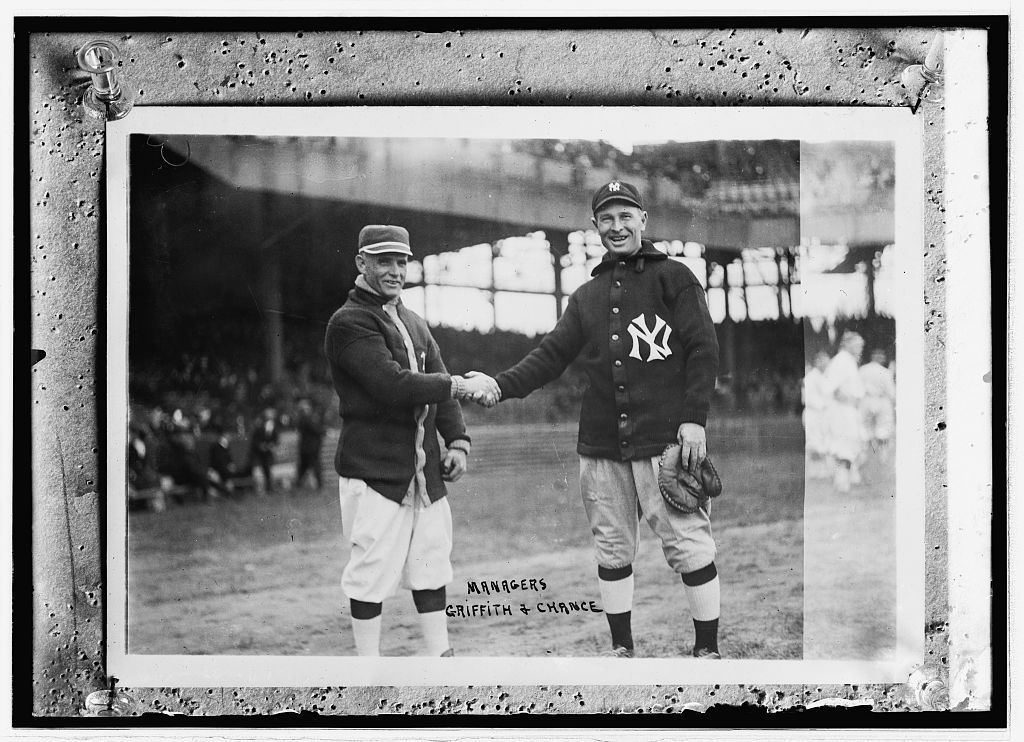
Managers Griffith and Chance

=== Washington Senators (1912–1920) ===
Late in the 1911 season, the American League's Washington Senators needed to raise money to pay for the construction of their new park, National Park, which had been hurriedly built just days before the start of the season after its predecessor, Boundary Park, burned down. Principal owner Thomas C. Noyes had been friends with Griffith, and asked one of his minority partners, Ed Walsh, to come to Washington as manager in 1912. At the same time, he also bought stock in the team as part of an effort to finance the construction of National Park. By selling the cattle on his Montana ranch, then mortgaging the ranch, Griffith was able to acquire a 10 percent stake in the Senators in two separate transactions totaling $27,000 ($900,776 in 2025 dollars), making him the team's largest single shareholder. At the time, the franchise had little going for it other than star pitcher Walter Johnson. In the American League's first 12 years, the Senators had never had a winning record or finished higher than sixth.

To entertain the fans, Griffith hired Nick Altrock as a first base coach in his first season with Washington. Described as a "natural buffoon", Altrock engaged in lighthearted fun while coaching first base. He wrestled with himself, copied the motions of the pitcher and made the fans laugh with other antics. Griffith also engineered one of the biggest turnarounds in major league history, leading the Senators to second place. In nine years, his Washington teams only twice finished below fifth in the eight-team league.

Through this time, Griffith frequently clashed with the Senators executives, who were sometimes unwilling to spend the money he felt necessary to make the team a consistent winner. Noyes had died in the middle of the 1912 season and was succeeded as president by Benjamin Minor. Unlike Noyes, Minor insisted that Griffith clear all transactions with him. Griffith began an effort to increase his interest in the team. Along the way, he used his ties with Secretary of War Newton D. Baker to keep the baseball season going past July after the government issued a "work or fight" order requiring all able-bodied men to either serve in the military or work in an essential occupation. Griffith persuaded Baker to allow ballplayers to perform military drills on the field with bats rather than rifles, allowing the season to go on through Labor Day.

In late 1919, frustrated by continued resistance on the board, Griffith joined forces with Philadelphia grain broker William Richardson, a close friend of Mack's, to buy controlling interest in the Senators. Minor was more than willing to sell, believing he could no longer devote attention to the team. Griffith boosted his holdings to 44 percent, while Richardson bought a 40.4 percent stake. Richardson and Griffith quickly came to an agreement that allowed Griffith to vote Richardson's shares as well, effectively giving Griffith a commanding 84 percent controlling interest. This all but assured his election as team president that November. At the same time, the Senators' home park, National Park, was renamed Griffith Stadium.

Griffith stepped down as manager after the 1920 season to devote all his energy to the front office. He finished his managerial career with a 1,491–1,367 record. His 1,491 wins ranked 19th all-time as of 2005. During his managing tenure, Griffith had a tradition of treating the fans to a farce game as the final game of the season. This tradition is a factor in the inflation of Walter Johnson's minuscule ERA from 1.09 to 1.14 in 1913.

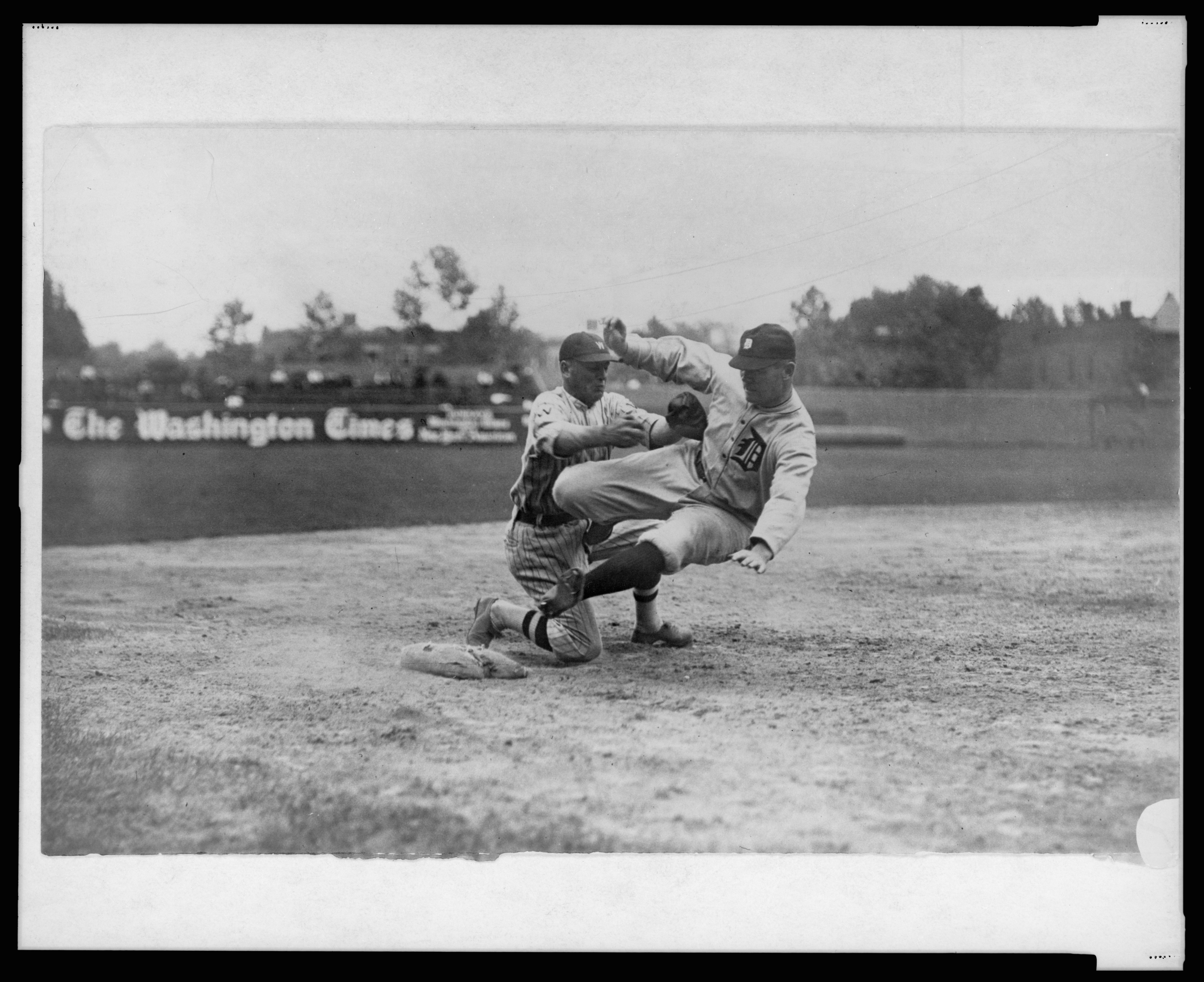
Harry Heilmann, in a poorly executed slide, is tagged out by Washington Senators' third baseman Howard Shanks, 1921.

Griffith was known for running the Senators on a shoestring. This was almost out of necessity; unlike most other owners, he had no income other than the Senators and Griffith Stadium. However, the Washington Redskins (who moved into the stadium in 1937 from Boston) and other tenants enabled him to turn a profit for 21 straight years.

He was known for his faith in young players. He twice entrusted 27-year-old players to manage his teams—Bucky Harris in 1924 and Joe Cronin in 1933. Griffith's wagers appeared to pay off, as the Senators won the pennant in both years under their new youthful managers. In Harris' case, they won the 1924 World Series. Cronin came to the team as a player when Griffith's friend Joe Engel, a former Senators pitcher, was placed in charge of the Chattanooga Lookouts at Engel Stadium. Engel was the first to scout Cronin for the club and said, "I knew I was watching a great player. I bought Cronin at a time he was hitting .221. When I told Clark Griffith what I had done, he screamed, "You paid $7,500 for that bum? Well, you didn't buy him for me. You bought him for yourself. He's not my ballplayer – he's yours. You keep him and don't either you or Cronin show up at the ballpark." Cronin later married Griffith's niece, Mildred June Robertson. He also leaned heavily on Joe Cambria, a scout who frequently found talented Cuban players for Griffith.

Ironically given his faith in young players, Griffith either would not or could not spend money on a farm system, preferring to mine prospects from independent minor league teams. For a time, the Senators had only three minor league teams–the Class A1 (now Double-A) Lookouts, the Class B (equivalent to a short-season A team before 2021, and a Low-A team since 2021) Charlotte Hornets, and the Class D (equivalent to a Rookie-level team today) Orlando Senators. This was a major reason why the Senators were unable to put together a consistent winner, especially after World War II.

Through all of this, Griffith's hold on the team appeared secure. When Richardson died in 1942, his twin brother, George, inherited his stake and voiced full confidence in Griffith. However, George died in 1948, triggering a series of events that almost cost Griffith control of the team. In 1949, after a string of mostly humdrum seasons, the Richardson estate sold its stake to John Jachym, a businessman who had been a scout for the St. Louis Cardinals and Detroit Tigers. Griffith long believed he had the right to match any offer made by the Richardson estate, and was surprised when Jachym arrived at Griffith Stadium as part-owner. Jachym had no intention of being a silent partner, but Griffith was able to persuade his board to rebuff Jachym's effort to have any say in team affairs. He was particularly angered when Jachym expressed his fondness for longtime Cardinals general manager Branch Rickey, whom Griffith had long detested. When Jachym proposed buying the Buffalo Bisons of the International League, which would have given the Senators a Triple-A team for the first time, Griffith turned the request down out of hand.

Frustrated at being shut out, Jachym sold his stake to H. Gabriel Murphy six months later. However, Griffith understood that unless the team improved, the next vote would go against him.

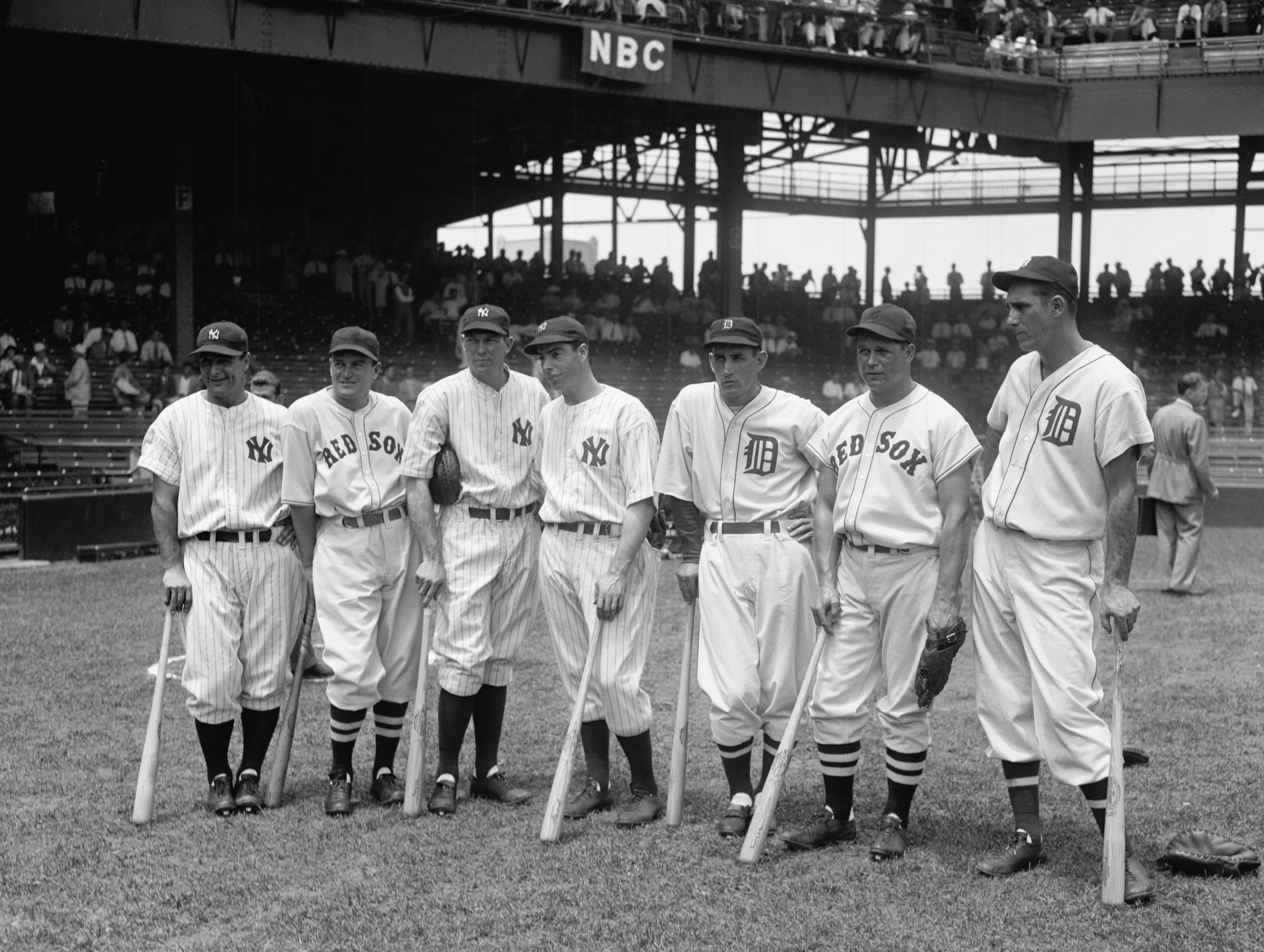
The 1937 All-Star game, played at Griffith Stadium, featuring seven Hall of Fame American League players. (Lou Gehrig, Joe Cronin, Bill Dickey, Joe DiMaggio, Charlie Gehringer, Jimmie Foxx, and Hank Greenberg)

To protect himself, Griffith persuaded Murphy to sell him enough stock to give him 52 percent of the club, making Griffith majority owner in name as well as in fact. In return, Griffith gave Murphy right of first refusal on his shares should the Griffiths ever decide to sell. However, Griffith stubbornly resisted all efforts to modernize. For example, it would be 1955 before he hired as manager anyone who wasn't a current Senators or ex-Senators player. Additionally, he actively supported the St. Louis Browns' move to Baltimore, a mere 30 miles north, as the Baltimore Orioles, even though it would have almost certainly cut into the Senators' attendance.

=== Managerial record ===
Team	Year	Regular season					Postseason			
Team	Year	Games	Won	Lost	Win %	Finish	Won	Lost	Win %	Result
CWS	1901	136	83	53	.610	1st in AL	–	–	–	No postseason
CWS	1902	134	74	60	.552	4th in AL	–	–	–	–
CWS total		270	157	113	.581		0	0	–	
NYH	1903	134	72	62	.537	4th in AL	–	–	–	–
NYH	1904	151	92	59	.609	2nd in AL	–	–	–	–
NYH	1905	149	71	78	.477	6th in AL	–	–	–	–
NYH	1906	151	90	61	.596	2nd in AL	–	–	–	–
NYH	1907	148	70	78	.473	5th in AL	–	–	–	–
NYH	1908	56	24	32	.429	fired	–	–	–	–
NYH total		789	419	370	.531		0	0	–	
CIN	1909	153	77	76	.503	4th in NL	–	–	–	–
CIN	1910	154	75	79	.487	5th in NL	–	–	–	–
CIN	1911	153	70	83	.458	6th in NL	–	–	–	–
CIN total		470	222	238	.483		0	0	–	
WSH	1912	152	91	61	.599	2nd in AL	–	–	–	–
WSH	1913	154	90	64	.584	2nd in AL	–	–	–	–
WSH	1914	154	81	73	.526	3rd in AL	–	–	–	–
WSH	1915	153	85	68	.556	4th in AL	–	–	–	–
WSH	1916	153	76	77	.497	7th in AL	–	–	–	–
WSH	1917	153	74	79	.484	5th in AL	–	–	–	–
WSH	1918	128	72	56	.563	3rd in AL	–	–	–	–
WSH	1919	140	56	84	.400	7th in AL	–	–	–	–
WSH	1920	152	68	84	.447	6th in AL	–	–	–	–
WSH total		1339	693	646	.518		0	0	–	
Total		2858	1491	1367	.522		0	0	–	

== National Baseball Hall of Fame ==
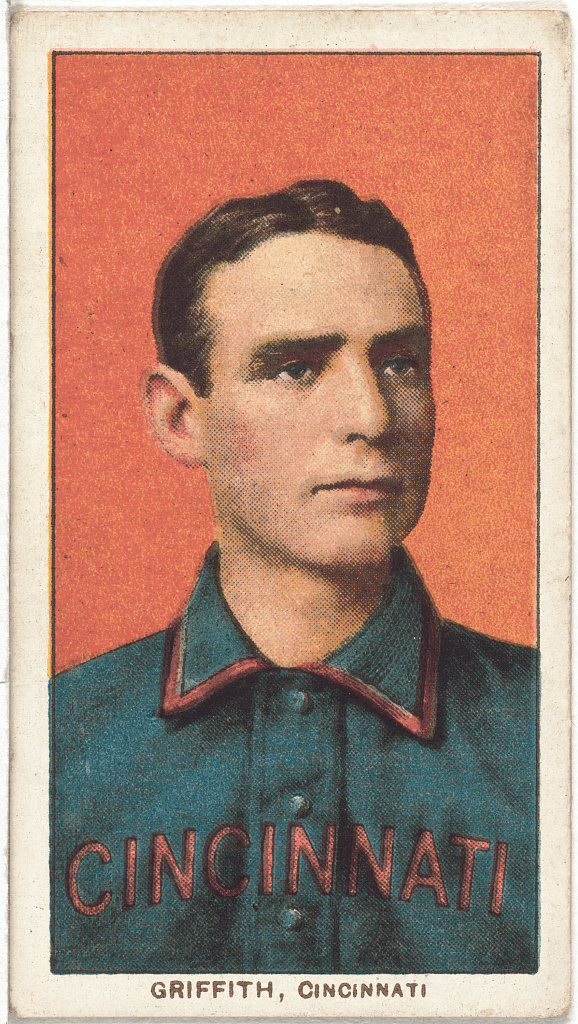
T206 Griffith baseball card

In 1939, sportswriter Bob Considine expressed disappointment that Griffith had not already been elected to the Baseball Hall of Fame. He referred to Griffith as "the real father of the American League", citing the fact that Griffith had been a key force in attracting National League players to join the American League teams in their initial years. He wrote that Griffith "belongs in any hall of fame where the elective body is composed of sports writers, for no other reason than that no sports writer ever came away from the old guy without a story. Some of them were even kindly stories."

Griffith had appeared on ballot for the second Baseball Hall of Fame election (1937), but he received 2% of the possible votes. In 1938, he received votes on only 3.8% of the submitted ballots. He received votes on 7.3% of ballots the next year. The Hall of Fame held only triennial elections for a few years. In 1942, 30.5% of voters submitted Griffith's name.

Griffith was elected to the Baseball Hall of Fame by the Old Timers Committee in 1946. He was honored at the induction ceremony the following year. According to author Dennis Corcoran, Griffith had attended the initial Hall of Fame induction ceremony in 1939 but that there is no evidence that Griffith came to the 1947 induction or any other ceremony.

== Death and legacy ==
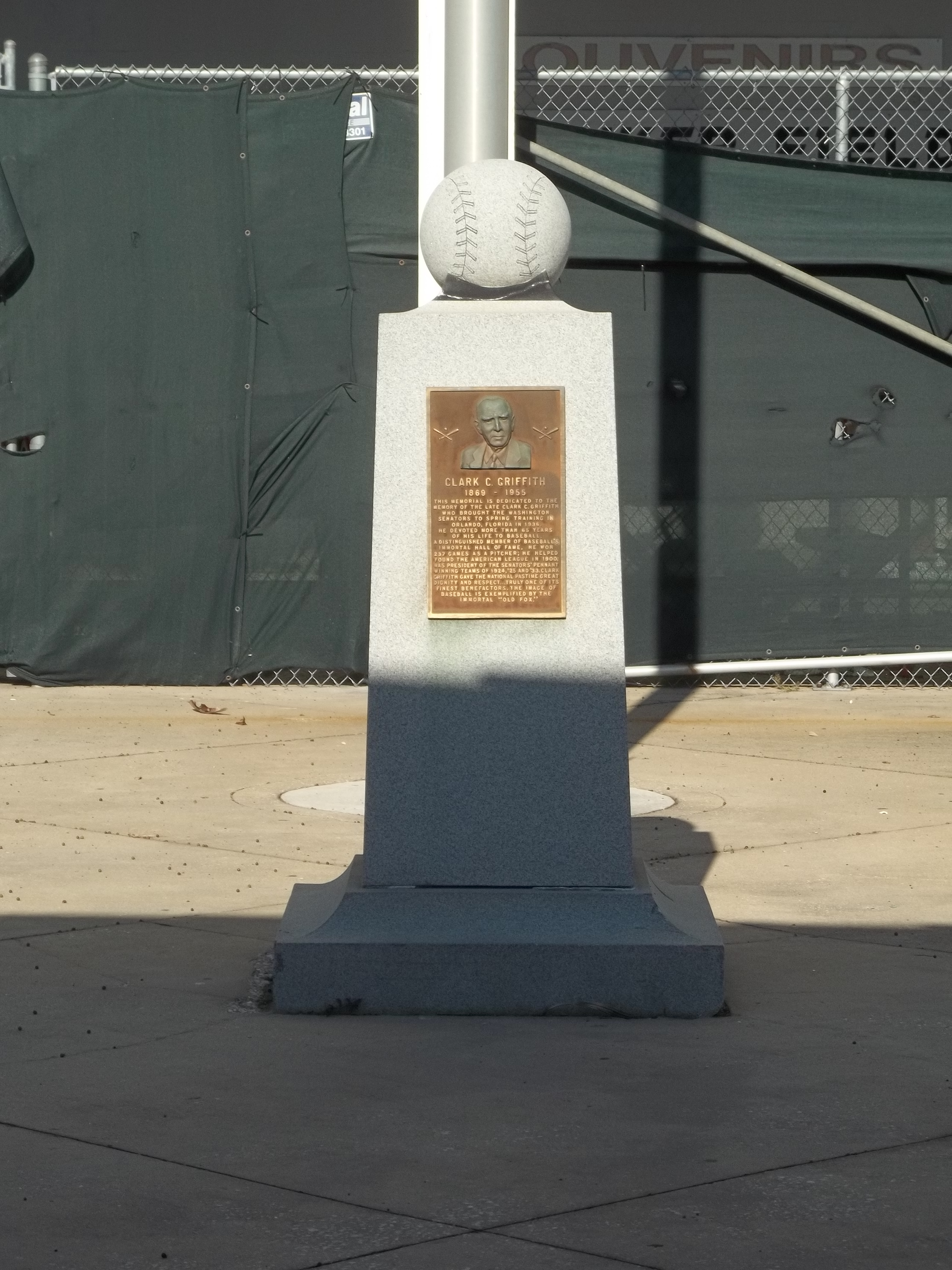
Memorial to Griffith at Tinker Field in Orlando

In October 1955, Griffith was in the hospital with neuritis when he suffered a stomach hemorrhage. Though he appeared to be improving, Griffith died a few days after he was hospitalized. He was nearing his 86th birthday.

After his death, newspaper accounts described Griffith's longtime relationships with U.S. presidents. During World War I, he successfully petitioned Woodrow Wilson to allow the continuation of baseball. He did the same with Franklin D. Roosevelt during World War II. He had also begun a tradition of presidents throwing out the ceremonial first pitch at a season's first Opening Day game, which started with William Howard Taft. When the Baseball Hall of Fame was being built and was looking for baseball memorabilia, Griffith donated several photographs of these presidential first pitches.

League president Will Harridge called Griffith "one of the game's all-time great figures." Griffith was survived by his wife, who died of a heart attack two years later. He and his wife had no children, but they raised several relatives. One of those relatives was Calvin Griffith, who was informally adopted by Clark and Addie at the age of 11. Calvin took over the team after his uncle's death and led efforts to have the club moved to Minnesota and become the Twins. The younger Griffith held on to the team until 1984, when he sold it to Carl Pohlad, thus ending the Griffith family's 65-year ownership of the franchise. Another nephew, Sherry Robertson, played infield and outfield for the Senators and the Philadelphia Athletics in the 1940s and 1950s.

A monument was erected in honor of Griffith at Griffith Stadium. After the stadium was demolished in 1964, the obelisk was moved to Robert F. Kennedy Memorial Stadium, where the Washington Nationals played between 2005 and 2007. A collegiate baseball league, the National Capital City Junior League, was renamed in honor of Griffith after his death. The league suspended operations in 2010.

== Gallery ==
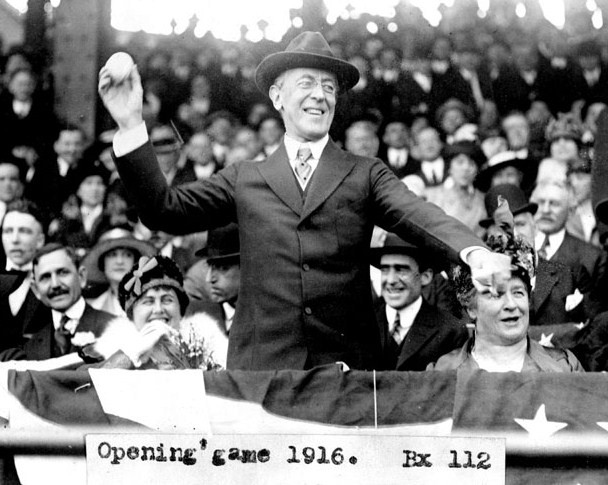
Woodrow Wilson opens the season at Griffith Stadium, April 20, 1916

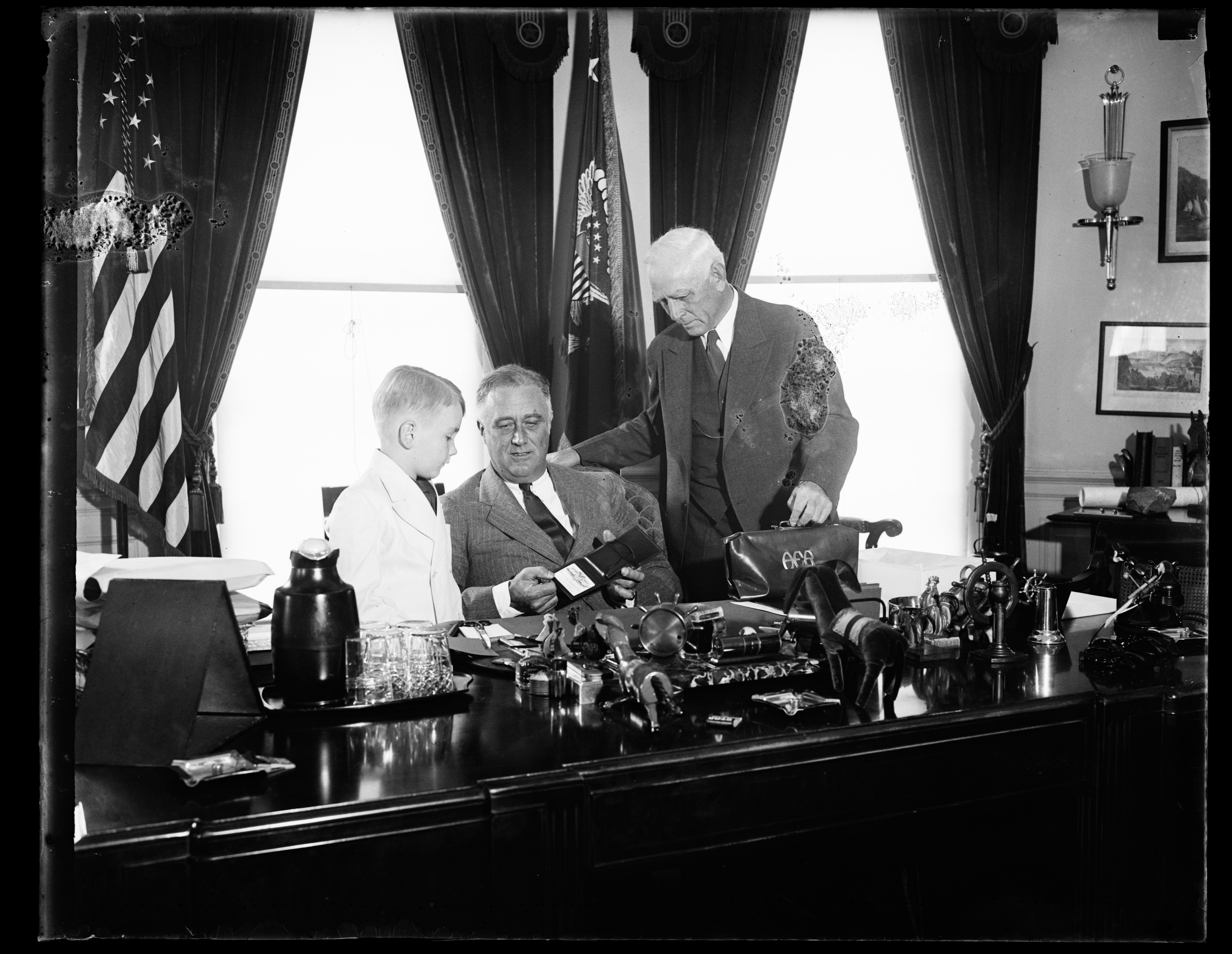
Griffith presents President Franklin D. Roosevelt with a gold pass

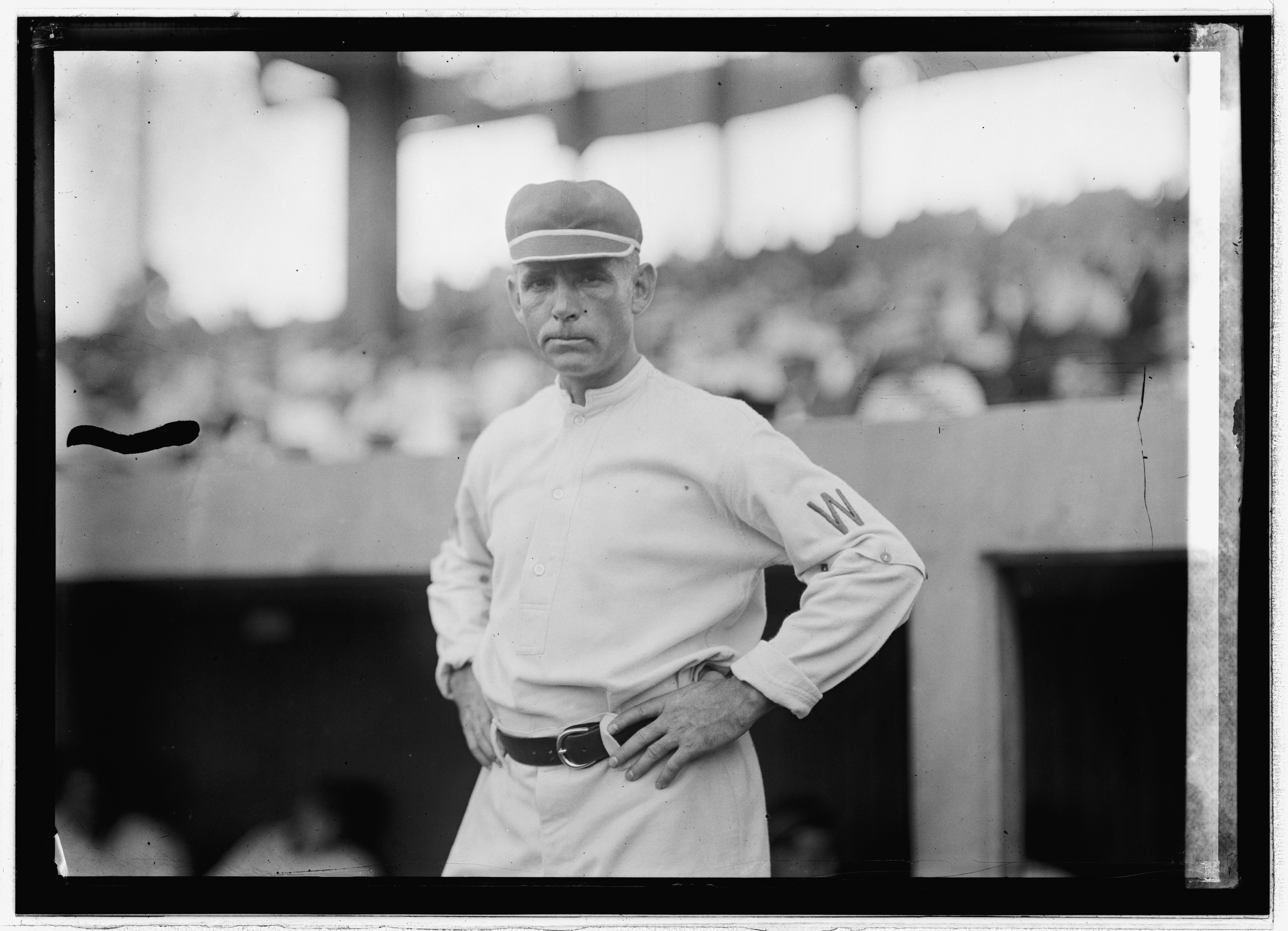
Clark Griffith as Manager of the Washington Senators, 1913

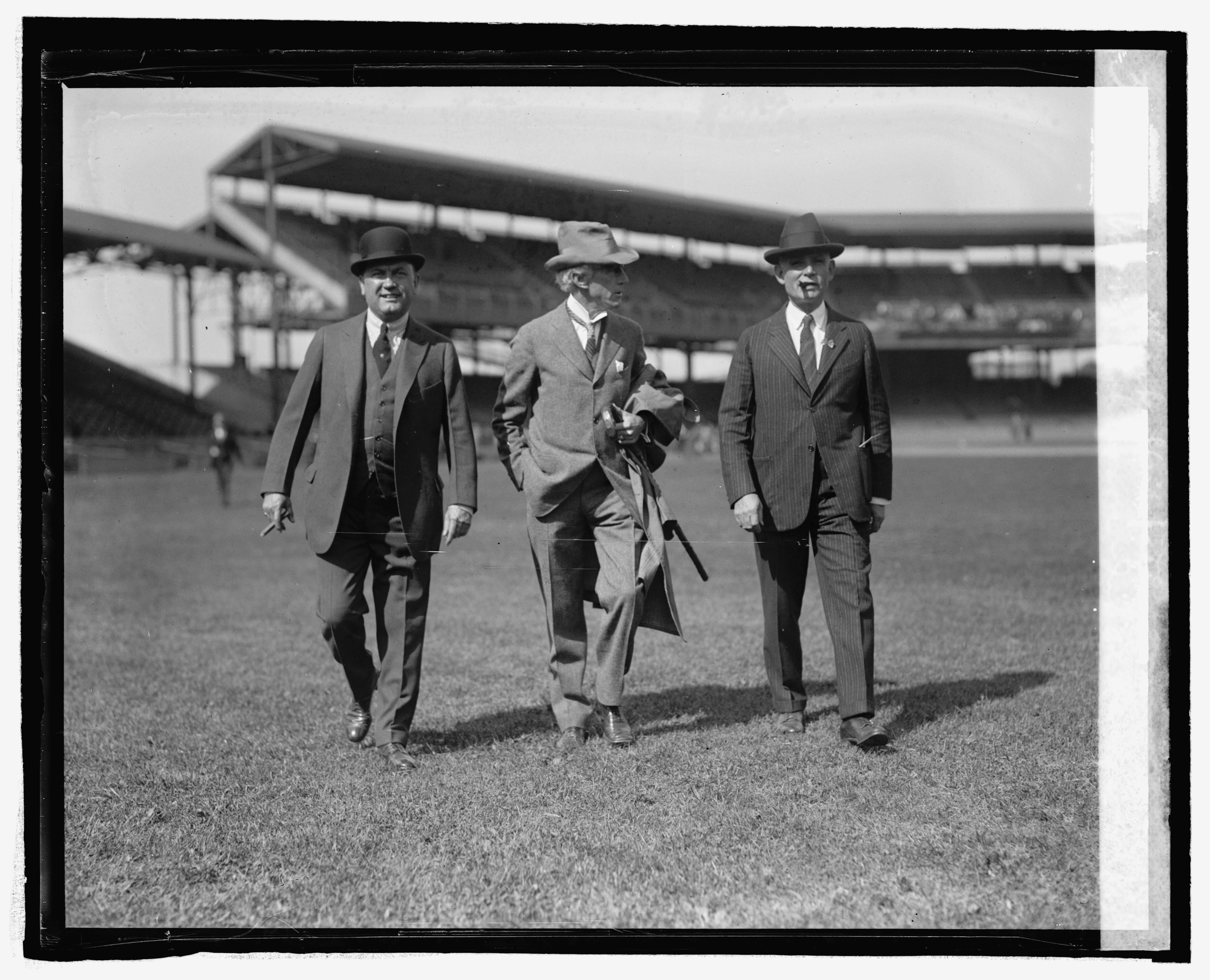
W. M. Richardson, Judge Landis and Clark Griffith, 1924

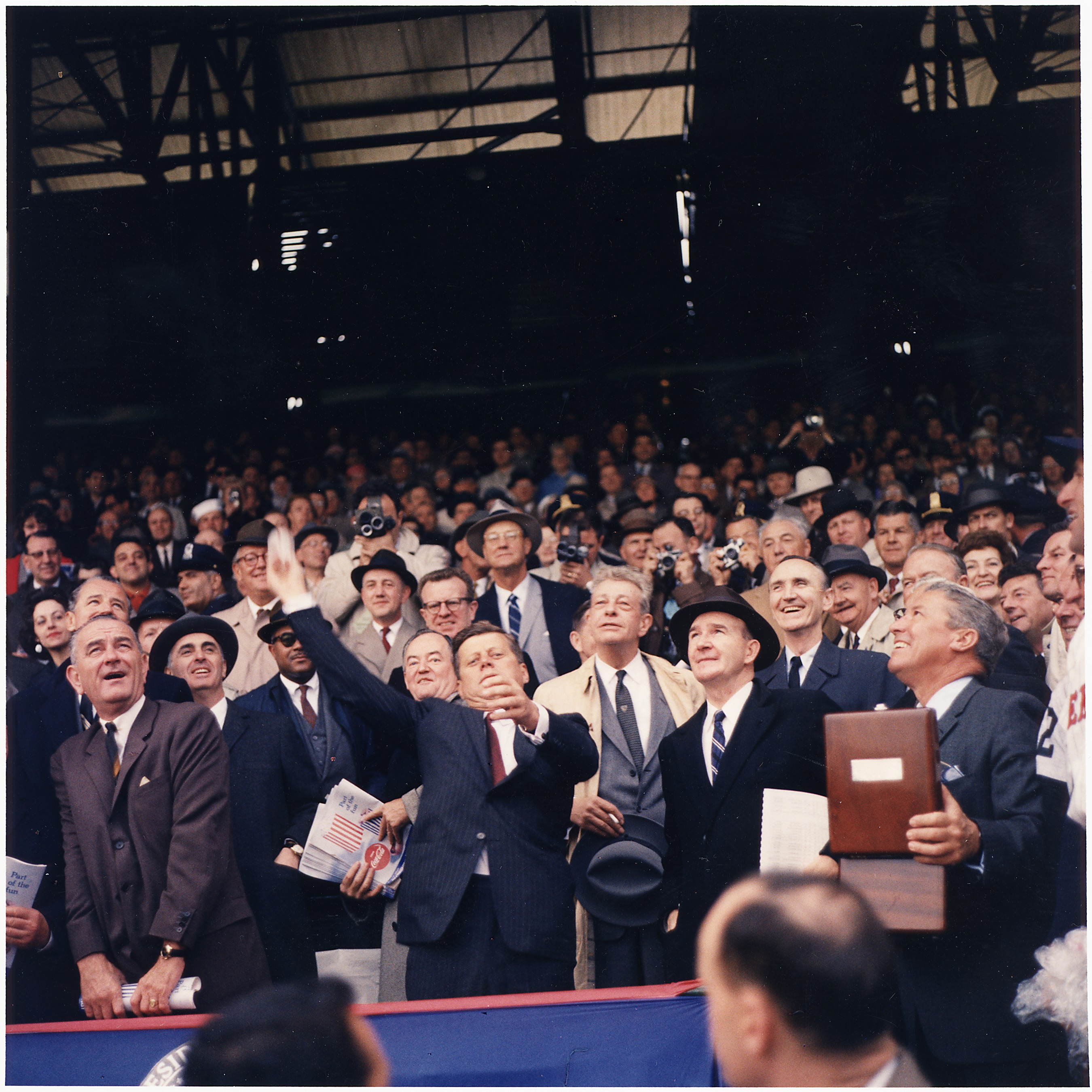
John F. Kennedy throws out the first ball, Opening Day, April 10, 1961 is incorrectly attributed to the original Senators, (Moved to MN, inaugural season was 1961) as the expansion Senators team who would become the Texas Rangers were in place.

== See also ==
- List of Major League Baseball career wins leaders
- List of Major League Baseball annual ERA leaders
- List of Major League Baseball managers with most career ejections
- List of Major League Baseball managers with most career wins
- List of Major League Baseball player-managers
- List of Major League Baseball career hit batsmen leaders
