= Tom Gardner =

American entrepreneur (born 1968)

- Born: April 16, 1968 (age 57)
- Occupation: Entrepreneur
- Known for: Founder/CEO of the Motley Fool

Tom Gardner (born April 16, 1968) is an American entrepreneur. He is CEO and one of three founders of the Motley Fool.

== Early life and education ==
Gardner attended Brown University, graduating in 1990 with a B.A. with honors in English and creative writing. He later pursued two master's degrees at the University of Montana but left the programs to return to the D.C. area. He received an honorary PhD in humane letters from Strayer University in 2000.

== Career ==
In 1993, he and his older brother, David Gardner, started the Motley Fool as a vehicle for teaching people about saving and investing in stocks. Gardner is the author of The Motley Fool Hidden Gems newsletter, which aims to find the most promising small public companies for investment, and The Motley Fool Stock Advisor newsletter, in which he competes with his brother, David. The two had learned how to invest from their father.

Gardner has testified before the United States Congress, calling for greater transparency in Wall Street dealings.

The Gardner brothers have co-authored several books, including The Motley Fool Investment Guide, You Have More Than You Think, Rule Breakers, Rule Makers, and The Motley Fool Investment Guide for Teens.
