= David Gardner (The Motley Fool) =

American entrepreneur

- Born: May 16, 1966 (age 59)
- Occupation: Entrepreneur
- Known for: Founder of The Motley Fool

David Gardner (born May 16, 1966) is an American entrepreneur and one of the three founders of The Motley Fool.

== Early life and education ==
He attended the University of North Carolina at Chapel Hill on a Morehead Scholarship, graduating in 1988. He also attended the Saint Albans School, Washington, D.C., before going on to St. Mark's School in Southboro, Massachusetts, and graduated from there.

== Career ==
He was a writer for Louis Rukeyser's Wall Street newsletter before joining the Motley Fool. David is the lead advisor on The Motley Fool Rule Breakers advisory service, and co-lead with his brother Tom on The Motley Fool Stock Advisor, the company's flagship subscription offering. His investment philosophy favors passive long-term holding of dynamic growth stocks.

He is also the inventor of Motley Fool CAPS, a site that features the community intelligence of 75,000+ ranked stock pickers drawn mainly from The Motley Fool Community.

== Personal life ==
He is the older brother of Tom Gardner. The Gardner brothers have co-authored several books, including The Motley Fool Investment Guide, You Have More Than You Think, Rule Breakers, Rule Makers, The Motley Fool Investment Guide for Teens, and the Million Dollar Portfolio.
