= Washington Senators (1901–1960) =

Former baseball team in Washington

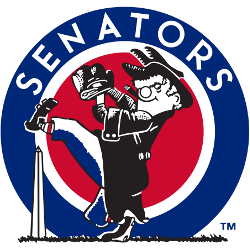

Logo	Cap insignia

Information
- League: American League
- Ballpark: Griffith Stadium (1911–1960)
- Established: 1901
- Relocated: 1961 (to Minneapolis; became the Minnesota Twins)
- Nickname(s): Grifs (1912–1920); Nats (1905–1955)
- World Series championships: 1: 1924
- American League pennants: 3: 1924; 1925; 1933
- Former name: Washington Nationals (1905–1955)
- Former ballpark(s): American League Park (1901–1903); Boundary Field (1904–1910)
- Colors: Blue, red, white
- Retired numbers: 3; 36
- Ownership: Clark Griffith (1920–1955); Calvin Griffith (1955–1960)
- Manager: List of managers: Clark Griffith (1912–1921); Bucky Harris (1924–1928); Walter Johnson (1929–1932); Joe Cronin (1933–1934); Bucky Harris (1935–1942, 1950–1954)

The Washington Senators were a Major League Baseball team based in Washington, D.C. It was one of the American League's eight charter franchises, founded in 1901. The Senators spent 60 seasons in Washington, winning three American League pennants (1924, 1925, 1933) and one World Series in 1924. The franchise relocated to Minneapolis in 1961 to become the present-day Minnesota Twins.

The team was officially named the "Senators" during 1901–1904, the Nationals during 1905–1955 and the Senators again during 1956–1960, but nonetheless was commonly referred to as the Senators throughout its history (and unofficially as the "Grifs" during Clark Griffith's tenure as manager during 1912–1920). The name "Nationals" appeared on the uniforms for only two seasons, and then was replaced with the "W" logo. However, the names "Senators," "Nationals" and shorter "Nats" were used interchangeably by fans and media throughout the team's history; in 2005, the latter two names were revived for the current National League franchise that had previously played in Montreal.

For a time, from 1911 to 1933, the Senators were one of the more successful franchises in Major League Baseball. The team's rosters included Baseball Hall of Fame members Goose Goslin, Sam Rice, Joe Cronin, Bucky Harris, Heinie Manush and all-time career shutout leader, Walter Johnson. The Senators experienced extended periods of poor on-field performance, including six last-place finishes in the 1940s and 1950s. Despite the team's limited success, several notable players, including Joe Judge, Cecil Travis, Buddy Myer, Roy Sievers, and Eddie Yost, played for the team during this period.

After the team's relocation to Minnesota in 1961, the Twins largely brushed their history in Washington aside, in part due to the team's lack of success in the decades preceding the move. However, in recent years, the team has taken an effort to better acknowledge their past as the Senators. Many prominent Twins players (such as Hall of Famers Jim Kaat and Harmon Killebrew, as well as perennial All-Stars Bob Allison and Camilo Pascual) spent significant time as Senators before moving with the team. In 2024, on the 100th anniversary of the Senators' 1924 World Series victory (their only championship during their time in D.C.), the Twins held a ceremony at Target Field unveiling a "W" displayed alongside their retired numbers to honor the Senators' legacy in Washington. Kaat, who debuted for the Senators in 1959, expressed his appreciation for the club in his speech at the ceremony, stating "Without the Washington Senators, there would be no Minnesota Twins".

The Washington Senators had an overall win–loss record of 4,223–4,864–101 (.465) during their 60 years in Washington, D.C. Six former Washington Senators players were elected to the National Baseball Hall of Fame.

== History ==
=== A losing start for a charter franchise ===
When the American League declared itself a major league in 1901, the new league moved the previous minor Western League's Kansas City Blues franchise to Washington, a city that had been abandoned by the older National League a year earlier. The new Washington club, like the old one, was called the "Senators" (the second of three franchises to hold the name). Jim Manning moved with the Kansas City club to manage the first Senators team.

The Senators began their history as a consistently losing team, at times so inept that San Francisco Chronicle columnist Charley Dryden famously joked, "Washington: First in war, first in peace, and last in the American League," a play on the famous line in Henry Lee III's eulogy for President George Washington as "First in war, first in peace, and first in the hearts of his countrymen". The 1904 Senators lost 113 games, and the next season the team's owners, trying for a fresh start, changed the team's name to the "Nationals" (and occasionally nicknamed the "Nats"). However, the "Senators" name remained widely used by fans and journalists — in fact, the two names were used interchangeably — although "Nats" remained the team's nickname. The Senators name was officially restored in 1956.

=== A new era ===
The club continued to lose, despite the addition of a talented 19-year-old pitcher named Walter Johnson in 1907. Raised in rural Kansas, Johnson was a tall, lanky man with long arms who, using a leisurely windup and unusual sidearm delivery, threw the ball faster than anyone had ever seen. Johnson's breakout year was 1910, when he struck out 313 batters, posted an earned-run average of 1.36 and won 25 games for a losing ball club. Over his 21-year Hall of Fame career, Johnson, nicknamed the "Big Train", won 417 games and struck out 3,508 batters, a major-league record that stood for more than 50 years.

In 1911, the Senators' wooden ballpark burned to the ground, and they replaced it with a modern concrete-and-steel structure on the same location. First called National Park, it later was renamed Griffith Stadium, after the man who was named Washington manager in 1912 and whose name became almost synonymous with the ball club: Clark Griffith. A star pitcher with the National League's Chicago Colts in the 1890s, Griffith jumped to the AL in 1901 and became a successful manager with the Chicago White Sox and New York Highlanders. Walter Johnson blossomed in 1911 with 25 victories, although the Senators still finished the season in seventh place. In 1912, the Senators improved dramatically, as their pitching staff led the league in team earned run average and in strikeouts. Johnson won 33 games while teammate Bob Groom added another 24 wins to help the Senators finish the season in second place behind the Boston Red Sox. The Senators continued to perform respectably in 1913 with Johnson posting a career-high 36 victories, as the team once again finished in second place, this time to the Philadelphia Athletics. Starting in 1916, the Senators settled back into mediocrity. Griffith, frustrated with the owners' penny-pinching, bought a controlling interest in the team in 1920 and stepped down as field manager a year later to focus on his duties as team president. The minority interest was owned by William Richardson, who was content to remain in the background. The shares passed to his twin brother George on his death in 1942, and then to George's son William Richardson II in 1948. William Richardson II sold his shares to an unrelated party in 1949.

=== 1924: World champions ===
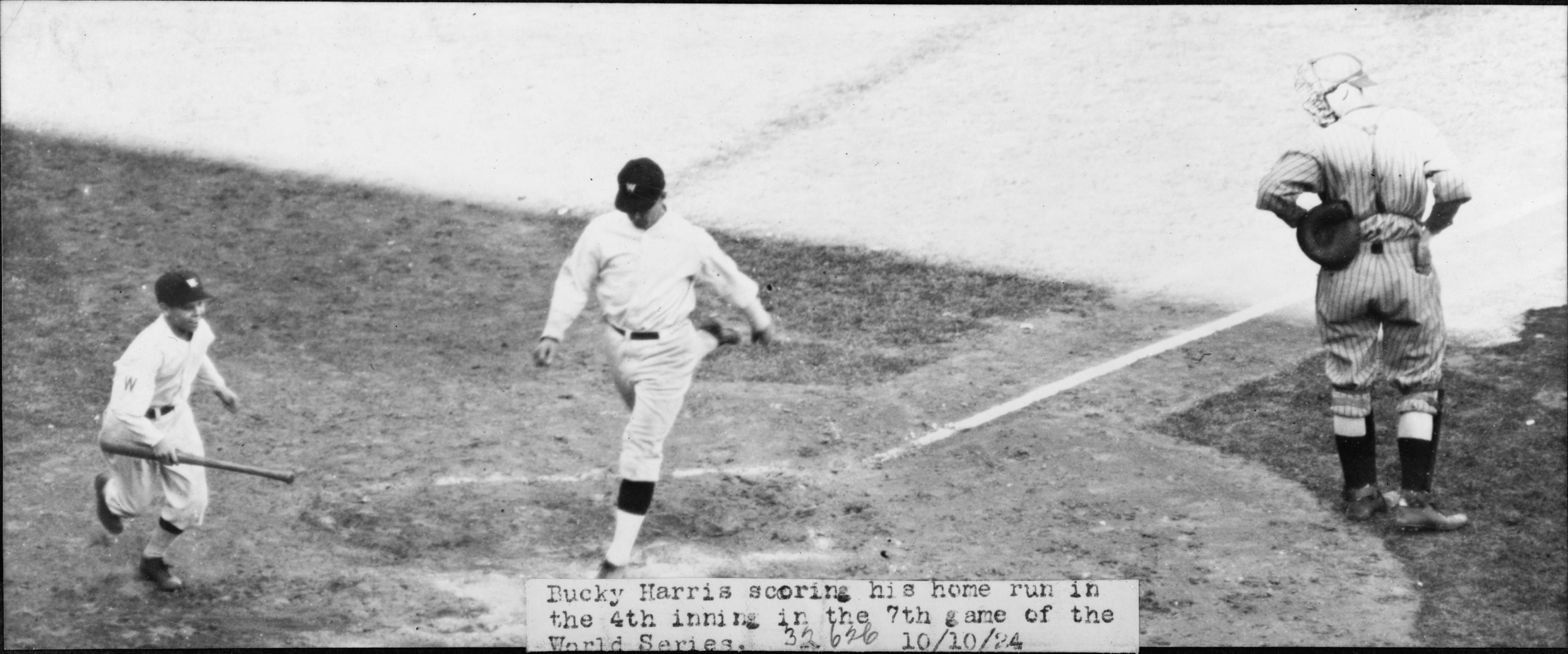
Washington's Bucky Harris scores on his home run in the fourth inning of Game 7 of the 1924 World Series.

In 1924, Griffith named 27-year-old second baseman Bucky Harris player-manager. Led by the hitting of Goose Goslin and Sam Rice, and a solid pitching staff headlined by the 36-year-old Johnson, the Senators captured their first American League pennant, two games ahead of Babe Ruth and the New York Yankees.

The Senators faced John McGraw's heavily favored New York Giants in the 1924 World Series. Despite Johnson losing both of his starts, the Senators kept pace to tie the Series at three games apiece and force Game 7. The Senators trailed the Giants 3–1 in the eighth inning of Game 7, when Bucky Harris hit a routine ground ball to third which hit a pebble and took a bad hop over Giants third baseman Freddie Lindstrom. Two runners scored on the play, tying the score at three. In the ninth inning with the game tied, 3–3, Harris brought in an aging Johnson to pitch on just one day of rest – he had been the losing pitcher in Game 5. Johnson held the Giants scoreless into extra innings. In the bottom of the 12th inning, Muddy Ruel hit a high foul ball near home plate. The Giants' catcher, Hank Gowdy, dropped his protective face mask to field the ball but, failing to toss the mask aside, stumbled over it and dropped the ball, thus giving Ruel another chance to bat. On the next pitch, Ruel hit a double and, then proceeded to score the winning run when Earl McNeely hit a ground ball that took another bad hop over Lindstrom's head. It was the only World Series triumph for the franchise during their 60-year tenure in Washington.

=== Building a winning tradition ===
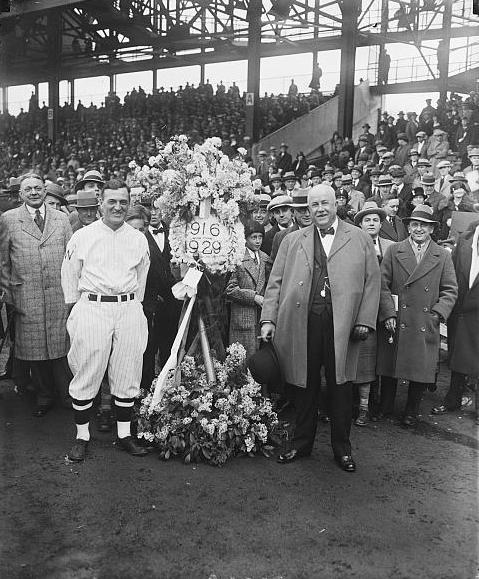
On behalf of the Elks of Washington, Joe Judge (front left), captain of the Senators, was presented with a floral tribute for the team before the start of a game in 1929

The Senators repeated as American League champions in 1925 but lost the World Series to the Pittsburgh Pirates. After Johnson's retirement in 1927, the Senators endured a few losing seasons until returning to contention in 1930, this time with Johnson as manager. But after the Senators finished third in 1931 and 1932, behind powerful Philadelphia and New York, Griffith fired Johnson, a victim of high expectations.

For his new manager in 1933, Griffith returned to the formula that worked for him in 1924, and 26-year-old shortstop Joe Cronin became player-manager. The change worked, as Washington posted a 99–53 record and swept to the pennant seven games ahead of the Yankees. But the Senators lost the World Series to the Giants in five games, and after that, the city would not host another World Series until 2019, when the Washington Nationals, its current National League team, defeated the Houston Astros.

=== Fading fortunes ===
The Senators sank all the way to seventh in 1934. Attendance plunged as well, and after the season Griffith traded Cronin to the Red Sox for journeyman shortstop Lyn Lary and $225,000 in cash (even though Cronin was married to Griffith's niece, Mildred). Despite the return of Harris as manager in 1935–42 and 1950–54, Washington remained mostly a losing ball club for the next 25 years, contending for the pennant only in the talent-thin war years of 1943 and 1945.

In the fall of 1953, the second major baseball franchise shift of the mid-20th century took place (after the Boston Braves moved to Milwaukee in 1952), with long suffering Baltimore civic and business interests purchasing the perennially cellar-dwelling St. Louis Browns from controversial but enterprising owner Bill Veeck and moving them 40 miles (64 km) northeast of Washington to the Chesapeake Bay port city. In the spring of 1954, the Browns moved to a newly renovated and modernized Memorial Stadium on the site of their former northeastern city collegiate football bowl, and replacing the earlier minor league level "Triple A" "Orioles" (also sometimes nicknamed the "Birds") of the International League where they had been consistent champions since the 1910s. The additional competition in the same League for Maryland and Virginia area baseball fans added to the complexion around the nation's capital for the rest of the 1950s as the new "Baltimore Orioles" swiftly built their team prospects with astute trades and farm system output during the rest of the decade, finally becoming pennant contenders by 1960. They continued their winning ways as one of the most dominant teams in professional baseball for the next two decades overpowering even the hapless third Senators franchise in 1961–1971.

The Senators were also the butt of many nationwide jokes during the 1950s, with the debut and running of a Broadway musical play in 1955 in New York City called "Damn Yankees" (based on an earlier best-selling novel and later movie in 1958), which followed a hapless elderly D.C. fan being given a "Faustian" or "devil's bargain," selling his soul to transform the team by becoming a young powerful new Senators player (played in the movie version by heart-throb leading-man actor Tab Hunter) and lead the lowly team to a pennant versus the Yankees.

In 1954, Senators farm system director Ossie Bluege signed a 17-year-old Harmon Killebrew. Because of his $30,000 signing bonus, an enormous amount for that time, baseball rules required Killebrew to spend the rest of 1954 with the Senators as a "bonus baby." Killebrew bounced between the Senators and the minor leagues for the next few years. He became the Senators' regular third baseman in 1959, leading the League with 42 home runs and earning a starting spot on the American League All-Star team.

=== Relocation ===
Clark Griffith died in 1955, and his nephew and adopted son Calvin took over the team presidency. He sold Griffith Stadium to the city of Washington and leased it back, leading to speculation that the team was planning to move, as the Boston Braves, St. Louis Browns and Philadelphia Athletics had done in the early 1950s, and the New York Giants and Brooklyn Dodgers would do later in the decade. After an early flirtation with San Francisco (with a "Triple A" Pacific Coast League team, the San Francisco Seals), by 1957 Griffith was courting Minneapolis–St. Paul in the Upper Midwest state of Minnesota, a prolonged process that resulted in his rejecting the Twin Cities' first offer before agreeing to relocate. The American League opposed the move at first, but in 1960, in the face of the Continental League's proposed Minnesota franchise, a deal was reached. The Senators moved and were replaced with an expansion Washington Senators team for 1961. The old Washington Senators became the new Minnesota Twins; the expansion Senators would become the Texas Rangers in 1972, and baseball would not return to the city until 2005, when the former Montreal Expos became the Washington Nationals.

== Achievements ==
=== Baseball Hall of Fame members ===
Washington Senators Hall of Famers
Affiliation according to the National Baseball Hall of Fame and Museum
Washington Senators

Stan Coveleski
Joe Cronin
Ed Delahanty

Rick Ferrell
Lefty Gomez
**Goose Goslin** *

Clark Griffith *
**Bucky Harris** *
Whitey Herzog
**Walter Johnson** *

Heinie Manush *
**Sam Rice** *
Al Simmons

George Sisler
Tris Speaker
Early Wynn

- Players and managers listed in **bold** are depicted on their Hall of Fame plaques wearing a Senators cap insignia.
- * Washington Senators listed as primary team according to the Hall of Fame

Cronin, Goslin, Griffith, Harris, Johnson, Killebrew and Wynn are listed on the Washington Hall of Stars display at Nationals Park (previously they were listed at Robert F. Kennedy Stadium). So are Ossie Bluege, George Case, Joe Judge, George Selkirk, Roy Sievers, Cecil Travis, Mickey Vernon and Eddie Yost.

=== Retired numbers ===
The Senators did not retire any numbers during their tenure in Washington D.C., though have had two players who played for the franchise in both Washington and Minnesota retired, that being Harmon Killebrew's #3, who played in Washington for seven seasons and Jim Kaat's #36, who played in Washington for two seasons. In 2024, the 100th anniversary of the franchise's first championship, the Twins retired a "W" to honor the franchise permanently.

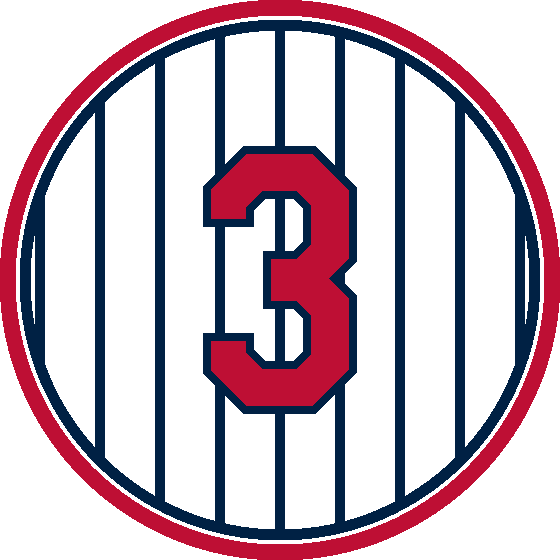
Harmon
Killebrew
LF/1B/3B
Retired May 4, 1975
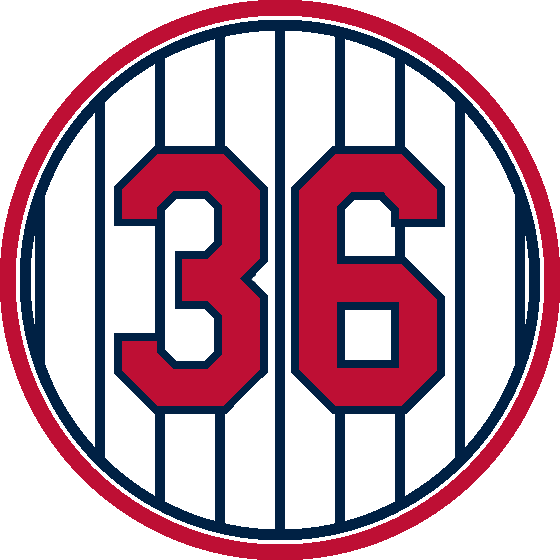
Jim
Kaat
P
Retired July 16, 2022

Player	Jersey	Position	Tenure	Date retired
Harmon Killebrew	3	LF/1B/3B	1954–1960	May 4, 1975
Jim Kaat	36	P	1959–1960	July 16, 2022

== Photos ==
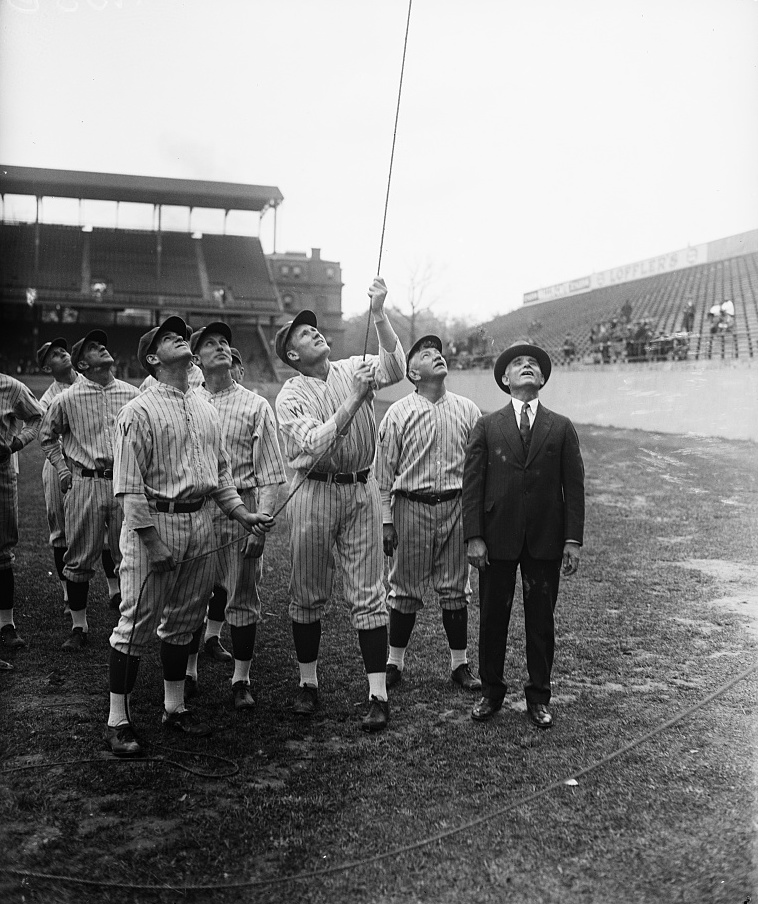
The Washington Senators led by star Walter Johnson and owner Clark Griffith hoist their championship banner at the 1925 opening day.

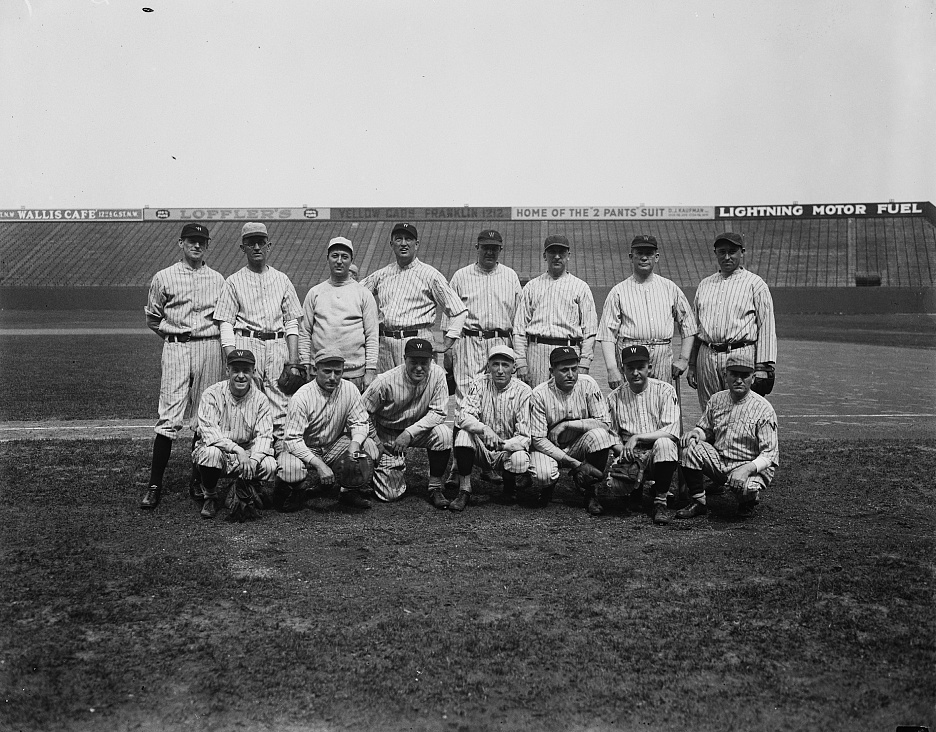
Washington Senators in the 1920s

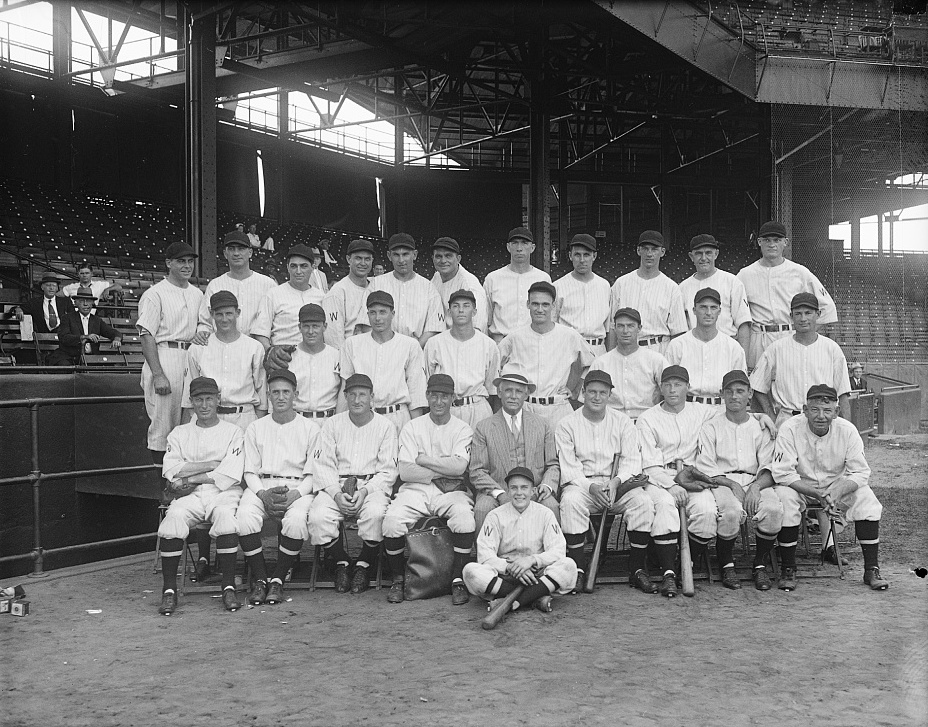
Washington Senators team picture in the early 1930s

== The Washington Senators in popular culture ==
The longtime competitive struggles of the team were fictionalized in the 1954 book The Year the Yankees Lost the Pennant, which became the 1955 Broadway musical Damn Yankees and the 1958 film starring then "heart-throb" leading-man actor Tab Hunter. The plot centers on Joe Boyd, a middle-aged real estate salesman and long-suffering fan of the Washington Senators baseball club. In this musical comedy-drama of the Faust legend, Boyd sells his soul to the Devil and becomes slugger Joe Hardy, the "long ball hitter the Senators need that he'd sell his soul for" (as spoken by him in a throwaway line near the beginning of the drama). His hitting prowess enables the Senators to win the American League pennant over the then-dominant Yankees. One of the songs from the musical, "Heart", is frequently played at baseball games.

The (expansion) Washington Senators were mentioned several times in Tom Clancy's book Without Remorse. As they performed even worse than the team they replaced, they were the subject of an updated joke: "Washington: First in war, first in peace, and still last in the American League." When the current Nationals had their own struggles, the joke was updated once again, this time to "Washington: First in war, first in peace, and last in the National League."

== See also ==
- List of Minnesota Twins seasons

Awards and achievements
Preceded by New York Yankees; 1923	World Series champions Washington Senators; 1924	Succeeded by Pittsburgh Pirates; 1925
Preceded by New York Yankees; 1921–1923	American League champions Washington Senators; 1924–1925	Succeeded by New York Yankees; 1926–1928
Preceded by New York Yankees; 1932	American League champions Washington Senators; 1933	Succeeded by Detroit Tigers; 1934–1935
