= The Motley Fool =

American financial and investing advice company

Motley Fool
- Logo since 2020
- Company type: Private
- Website type: Financial advisory services
- Founded: July 1993; 33 years ago
- Headquarters: Alexandria, Virginia, U.S.
- Area served: United States, United Kingdom, Australia, Canada, Germany, Japan, Hong Kong
- Owners: The Motley Fool, LLC
- Founders: David Gardner; Tom Gardner; Todd Etter; Erik Rydholm
- Website: www.fool.com

The Motley Fool is a private financial and investing advice company based in Alexandria, Virginia. It was founded in July 1993 by co-chairmen and brothers David Gardner and Tom Gardner, and Todd Etter and Erik Rydholm. The company employs over 300 people worldwide.

== Company name ==
The name "Motley Fool" is taken from Shakespeare's comedy As You Like It. It references the one character – the court jester – who could speak the truth to the Duke without having his head lopped off.

== History ==
=== Early years ===
In 1994, The Motley Fool published a series of statements online promoting a nonexistent sewage-disposal company. The messages, which were an April Fool's joke designed to teach a lesson about penny stock investing, garnered widespread attention, including an article in The Wall Street Journal. In August that year, the Gardners parlayed their one-year-old investment newsletter into a content partnership with America Online (AOL). In December, they were profiled in the "Talk of the Town" section of the New Yorker.

In 1996, David and Tom Gardner published The Motley Fool Investment Guide, which ranked on bestseller lists for The New York Times and Bloomberg Businessweek. The book was controversial; Bloomberg wrote about The Motley Fool's "Fanatical following", while a PBS Frontline episode described the company as made up of "20-somethings" giving "so-called advice".

In 1997, the Motley Fool's online presence moved from AOL to its own domain, Fool.com, where it continued to provide investment advice under an advertising-based revenue model.

=== "Foolish Four" and dot-com bust ===
In the late 1990s, the Motley Fool publicized their "Foolish Four" method of systematic trading, adapted from the Dogs of the Dow method for selecting stocks from the Dow Jones Industrial Average based on high dividend yield. They published a book on the topic in 1999. Journalist Jason Zweig criticized the Foolish Four method in 1999. Zweig describes selecting high-dividend yield stocks as a "sensible" strategy, at least on a preliminary level, as such stocks tend to be relatively inexpensive compared to other stocks using various valuation methods. However, Zweig said the Motley Fool staff made outlandish claims such as the ability to "crush mutual funds [in] only 15 minutes a year", used needlessly complicated mathematical formulas and he questioned the method's effectiveness. In 2000, Motley Fool writer Ann Coleman admitted that the Foolish Four method "turned out to be not nearly as wonderful a strategy as we thought". In 1999, McQueen and Thorley wrote a light hearted paper that used the Foolish Four portfolio to illustrate the limitations of any trading strategy based on data mining historical returns data, especially one described in a best selling book.

During the dot-com bubble and market collapse of 2001, the Motley Fool company removed 80% of its staff in three rounds of layoffs.

=== Expansion ===
In February 2002, The Motley Fool shifted to a subscription-based business model. The company launched its Stock Advisor program, offering subscribers monthly stock picks and premium investment education.

The company also established free and subscription-based businesses in several countries. As of 2023, The Motley Fool has operations in the United Kingdom, Australia, and Canada. In October 2019, the company announced that it was shutting down operations in Singapore. A year later, in October 2020, the company announced that it was also shutting down operations in Hong Kong.

In August 2018, the company launched a personal-finance sub-brand called The Ascent to provide personal finance product reviews and free educational resources.

In September 2019, the Motley Fool launched two more sub-brands. Millionacres provides subscription-based real estate investing advice and real estate resources.

On September 17, 2019, the Motley Fool launched its mobile game, Investor Island.

== Legislative efforts ==
Representatives of The Motley Fool have testified before Congress against mutual fund fees, in support of fair financial disclosure, on the Enron scandal, and the IPO process.

In 1999, the Securities and Exchange Commission proposed Regulation Fair Disclosure, which would require companies to simultaneously give vital information to Wall Street analysts and the public. In December 1999, Motley Fool author Bill Barker wrote an article telling readers to post comments on the SEC's website. The regulation passed, and in the July 2, 2001, edition of The Wall Street Journal, former SEC chairman Arthur Levitt is quoted saying, "Two-thirds of our letters came from Fools. Without them, Reg FD would not have happened".

== See also ==
- Investopedia
- List of financial market information services
- Seeking Alpha
- Totalise plc v Motley Fool Ltd
- Wall Street Survivor
