= 1946 in baseball =

The following are the baseball events of the year 1946 throughout the world.

== Champions ==
=== Major League Baseball ===
- Negro League World Series: Newark Eagles over Kansas City Monarchs (4–3)
- World Series: St. Louis Cardinals over Boston Red Sox (4–3)
- All-Star Game, July 9 at Fenway Park: American League, 12–0
- Negro League Baseball All-Star Game: East, 5–3 (first game, at Griffith Stadium); West, 4–1 (second game, at Comiskey Park)

=== Other champions ===
- Japanese Baseball League: Great Ring
- Mexican League: Alijadores de Tampico
- All-American Girls Professional Baseball League: Racine Belles

==== Winter Leagues ====
- Cuban League: Elefantes de Cienfuegos
- Mexican Pacific League: Venados de Mazatlán
- Puerto Rican League: Senadores de San Juan
- Venezuelan League: Sabios de Vargas

==== Club tournaments ====
- Interamerican Series: Brooklyn Bushwicks

== Awards and honors ==
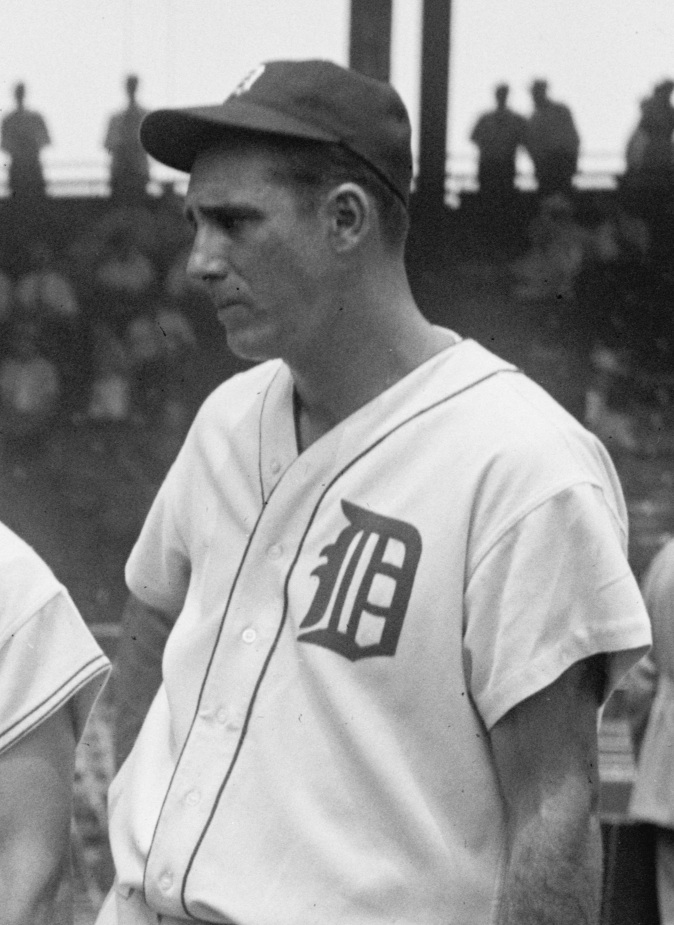
Hank Greenberg, Hall of Famer and 2-time MVP

- Baseball Hall of Fame
  - Jesse Burkett
  - Frank Chance
  - Jack Chesbro
  - Johnny Evers
  - Clark Griffith
  - Tommy McCarthy
  - Joe McGinnity
  - Eddie Plank
  - Joe Tinker
  - Rube Waddell
  - Ed Walsh
- Most Valuable Player
  - Ted Williams (AL) – OF, Boston Red Sox
  - Stan Musial (NL) – 1B, St. Louis Cardinals
- The Sporting News Player of the Year Award
  - Stan Musial (NL) – 1B, St. Louis Cardinals
- The Sporting News Manager of the Year Award
  - Eddie Dyer (NL) – St. Louis Cardinals
- The Sporting News Rookie of the Year Award
  - Del Ennis (NL) – OF, Philadelphia Phillies

== Statistical leaders ==
	American League		National League		Negro American League		Negro National League	
Stat	Player	Total	Player	Total	Player	Total	Player	Total
AVG	Mickey Vernon (WSH)	.353	Stan Musial (STL)	.365	Ted Strong (KCM)	.364	Monte Irvin (NE)	.369
HR	Hank Greenberg (DET)	44	Ralph Kiner (PIT)	23	Willard Brown (KCM); Ted Strong (KCM)	3	Josh Gibson (HOM)	13
RBI	Hank Greenberg (DET)	127	Enos Slaughter (STL)	130	Willard Brown (KCM)	27	Lennie Pearson (NE)	61
W	Bob Feller (CLE); Hal Newhouser (DET)	26	Howie Pollet (STL)	21	Connie Johnson (KCM); Steve Wylie (KCM)	5	Leon Day (NE)	13
ERA	Hal Newhouser (DET)	1.94	Howie Pollet (STL)	2.10	Satchel Paige (KCM)	1.29	Rufus Lewis (NE)	1.97
K	Bob Feller (CLE)	348	Johnny Schmitz (CHC)	135	Connie Johnson (KCM)	63	Leon Day (NE)	109

== Major league baseball final standings ==
=== American League final standings ===
American League
Team	W	L	Pct.	GB	Home	Road
Boston Red Sox	104	50	.675	—	61‍–‍16	43‍–‍34
Detroit Tigers	92	62	.597	12	48‍–‍30	44‍–‍32
New York Yankees	87	67	.565	17	47‍–‍30	40‍–‍37
Washington Senators	76	78	.494	28	38‍–‍38	38‍–‍40
Chicago White Sox	74	80	.481	30	40‍–‍38	34‍–‍42
Cleveland Indians	68	86	.442	36	36‍–‍41	32‍–‍45
St. Louis Browns	66	88	.429	38	35‍–‍41	31‍–‍47
Philadelphia Athletics	49	105	.318	55	31‍–‍46	18‍–‍59

Locations of teams for the 1942–1953 American League seasons
American League

=== National League final standings ===
National League
Team	W	L	Pct.	GB	Home	Road
St. Louis Cardinals	98	58	.628	—	49‍–‍29	49‍–‍29
Brooklyn Dodgers	96	60	.615	2	56‍–‍22	40‍–‍38
Chicago Cubs	82	71	.536	14½	44‍–‍33	38‍–‍38
Boston Braves	81	72	.529	15½	45‍–‍31	36‍–‍41
Philadelphia Phillies	69	85	.448	28	41‍–‍36	28‍–‍49
Cincinnati Reds	67	87	.435	30	35‍–‍42	32‍–‍45
Pittsburgh Pirates	63	91	.409	34	37‍–‍40	26‍–‍51
New York Giants	61	93	.396	36	38‍–‍39	23‍–‍54

Locations of teams for the 1943–1952 National League seasons
National League

== Negro league baseball final standings ==
All Negro leagues standings below are per MLB and Seamheads.

=== Negro American League final standings ===
vs. Negro American League						vs. Major Black teams			
Negro American League	W	L	T	Pct.	GB	W	L	T	Pct.
Kansas City Monarchs	48	17	2	.731	—	66	29	2	.691
Birmingham Black Barons	34	31	1	.523	14	51	39	3	.565
Cleveland Buckeyes	33	32	3	.507	15	45	44	5	.505
Cincinnati–Indianapolis Clowns	31	37	1	.457	18½	38	56	2	.406
Memphis Red Sox	32	42	2	.434	20½	46	62	5	.429
Chicago American Giants	30	49	1	.381	25	40	68	3	.374

Locations of teams for the 1946 Negro American League season
Negro American League
Note: Clowns play in both Indianapolis and Cincinnati.

=== Negro National League final standings ===
vs. Negro National League						vs. Major Black teams			
Negro National League	W	L	T	Pct.	GB	W	L	T	Pct.
Newark Eagles	46	16	2	.734	—	60	24	3	.707
New York Cubans	28	21	1	.570	11½	37	37	2	.500
Philadelphia Stars	27	28	1	.491	15½	33	40	4	.455
Baltimore Elite Giants	27	29	2	.483	16	43	35	3	.549
Homestead Grays	26	30	2	.466	17	52	40	4	.563
New York Black Yankees	8	38	0	.174	30	16	53	0	.232

Locations of teams for the 1944–1947 Negro National League seasons
Negro National League
Note: Homestead Grays played in both Washington, D.C. and Pittsburgh, with the majority in Washington, D.C.

=== Negro World Series ===
- 1946 Negro World Series: Newark Eagles over Kansas City Monarchs 4–3.

== All-American Girls Professional Baseball League final standings ==
Rank	Team	W	L	Pct.	GB
1	Racine Belles	74	38	.661	—
2	Grand Rapids Chicks	71	41	.569	3
3	South Bend Blue Sox	70	42	.625	4
4	Rockford Peaches	60	52	.536	14
5	Fort Wayne Daisies	52	60	.464	22
6	Muskegon Lassies	46	66	.411	28
7	Kenosha Comets	42	70	.375	32
8	Peoria Redwings	33	79	.295	41

== Japanese Baseball League final standings ==
Japanese Baseball League	W	L	T	Pct.	GB
Kinki Great Ring	65	38	2	.629	—
Tokyo Kyojin	64	39	2	.619	1
Osaka Tigers	59	46	0	.562	7
Hankyu	51	52	2	.495	14
Senators	47	58	0	.448	19
Gold Star	27	45	2	.378	22
Chubu Nippon	42	60	3	.414	22.5
Pacific	42	60	3	.414	22.5

== Events ==
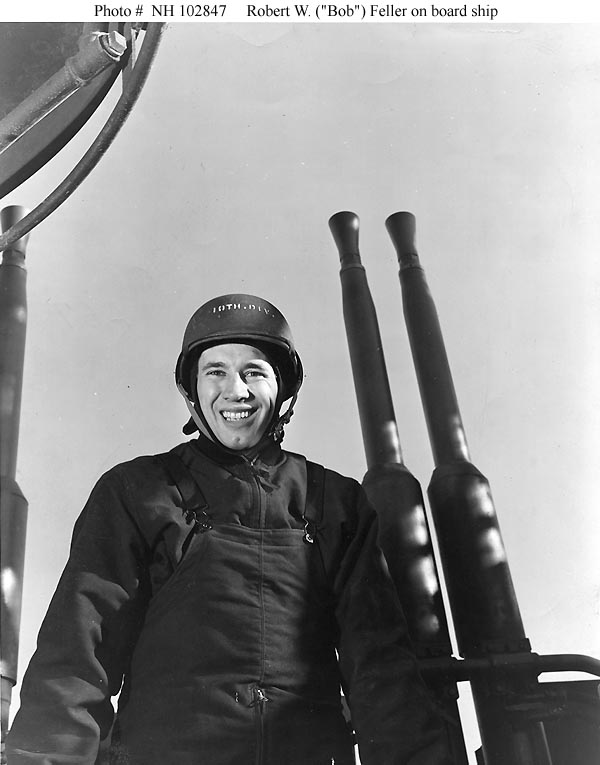
Bob Feller served in the U.S. Navy in the Pacific Theatre

=== January ===
- January 1
  - After the end of hostilities in World War II's Pacific Theatre on August 15, 1945, the first full peacetime season since 1939 anticipates a flood of returning and new players into North America's "Organized" and independent baseball in the coming year. Over 500 major-league and 4,000 minor-league players from the prewar era had entered the military, most of them after the Attack on Pearl Harbor in December 1941; three MLB players and "at least" 150 minor-leaguers lost their lives.
    - American and National league rosters are expanded for 1946: the off-season roster grows from 40 to 48 players; early-season squads grow to 36 players, and the cutdown date is delayed to June 15; and the normal active roster swells from 25 to 30 players.
  - The Negro American League and Negro National League will each field six teams and meet in the Negro World Series; a third black circuit, the startup, six-team West Coast Baseball Association, will disband before its first season is completed.
  - The All-American Girls Professional Baseball League, established in 1943, will feature eight clubs playing a 112-game schedule.
  - The Japanese Baseball League sets a 105-game schedule for 1946; an estimated 72 Japanese baseball players had died performing World War II service.
- January 2
  - The Pittsburgh Pirates name Ray Kennedy the first general manager in club history. A former infielder, Kennedy most recently was business manager of the Newark Bears, one of the top clubs in the New York Yankees' farm system.
  - The Chicago Cubs unconditionally release veteran right-hander Paul Derringer, 39, who won 16 games for their 1945 pennant winners last season. Although Derringer will sign a minor-league pact with Indianapolis, the release effectively ends his MLB career after 223 wins and World Series rings in both 1931 and 1940.
- January 3 – The Boston Red Sox acquire slugger/first baseman Rudy York from the reigning world champion Detroit Tigers for shortstop Eddie Lake. York, 32, will be selected to the American League's 1946 All-Star team for the sixth time in his ten-season career.
- January 5
  - The St. Louis Cardinals sell the contract of three-time National League All-Star catcher Walker Cooper to the New York Giants for $175,000—the highest price the Giants have ever paid for a player. Cooper, who will turn 31 on January 18, is still serving in the United States Navy, and has been battling Redbird owner Sam Breadon over his salary. He will be selected to his fourth All-Star team as a Giant this coming season.
  - The Boston Braves acquire 22-year-old first-base prospect Earl Torgeson from the Seattle Rainiers of the Pacific Coast League for two "players to be named later" (PTBNL): first baseman Tony York and outfielder Bill Ramsey. The Braves, who have signed a working agreement with Seattle, will keep Torgeson on the Rainiers' roster all season before calling him up to the National League in 1947.
- January 12
  - Boston Red Sox star Ted Williams receives his discharge from the U.S. Marine Air Corps after a three-year stint serving in World War II. Despite his long absence from competitive baseball, Williams will return to the majors by hitting .342 with 38 home runs and 123 RBI in 1946.
  - The first official professional game is played in Venezuela, launching the newly constituted four-team Liga de Béisbol Profesional de Venezuela. The league is composed of four teams: Caracas BBC, Magallanes BBC, Vargas BBC and Venezuela BBC. The inaugural game is won by Magallanes over Venezuela, 5–2, behind strong pitching from Alex Carrasquel, who gives up 11 hits in a complete game effort.
- January 20
  - Commissioner of Baseball Happy Chandler reveals that he, AL president Will Harridge and NL boss Ford Frick have conferred with leaders of the Negro American League and Negro National League regarding steps the Black leagues would require taking to have their circuits recognized as part of "Organized Baseball." Chandler notes that racial integration is not the goal of the talks, saying: "The Negro leagues favor keeping their own [players], and with their leagues on a sound basis, with a contract like the one we use, they expect these [players] to want to stay in their own class."
  - In a classic pitching matchup played in Caracas, Venezuela, Alex Carrasquel of Magallanes beats Roy Welmaker and Vargas club, 3–2, in 17 innings. In the six-and-a-half-hour marathon, Carrasquel is good enough to silence the bats of Roy Campanella and Sam Jethroe. Both pitchers go the distance in one of the greatest matchups ever.
- January 22 – The Boston Red Sox sell the contract of their hard-hitting, hard-living third baseman, Jim "Rawhide" Tabor, to the Philadelphia Phillies. Tabor, 29, averaged 15 homers and 30 errors annually over six seasons between 1939 and 1944.
- January 29 – The Brooklyn Dodgers announce the signing of right-hander Johnny Wright, 29, of the Homestead Grays, one of the top pitchers in the Negro National League. He becomes the second Black player to participate in Branch Rickey's plan to integrate all-white "Organized Baseball".

=== February ===
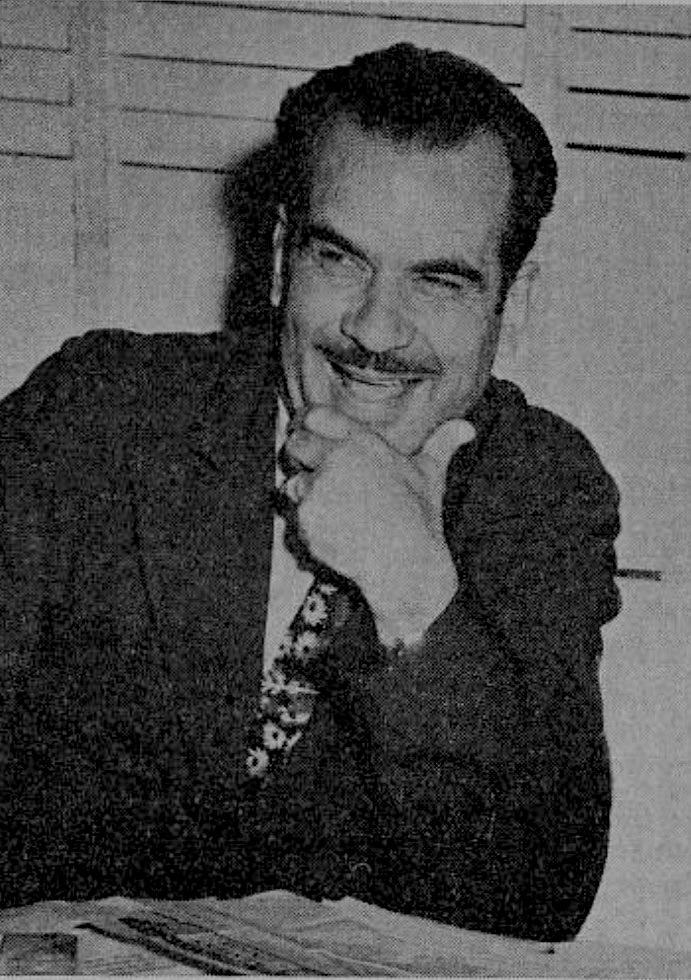
Jorge Pasquel, president of the Mexican League

- February 4–5 – Faced with the surge of World War II military veterans returning to baseball and a surplus of players, the St. Louis Cardinals sell the contracts of pitcher Al Jurisich and outfielder Johnny Wyrostek to the Philadelphia Phillies, and trade outfielder Johnny Hopp to the Boston Braves for shortstop Eddie Joost and $40,000.
- February 10
  - After three years of preparing for the coming seasons in cold-weather sites because of wartime travel restrictions, MLB teams resume spring training drills in warmer climes—setting up camps in Florida, California, Arizona and Panama.
  - Jackie Robinson, signed to a Montreal Royals contract, marries the former Rachel Isum in Los Angeles. After their honeymoon in Northern California, they will embark on a cross-country journey to the Brooklyn Dodgers' minor-league camp in Daytona Beach, where Robinson will begin his struggle to break "Organized Baseball's" color barrier.
- February 19 – New York Giants outfielder Danny Gardella becomes the first United States-born major leaguer to "jump" his contract and its reserve clause and defect to the "outlaw" Mexican League, the first shot in the series of events that will dominate baseball headlines in 1946. The Mexican loop, operating outside the purview of Organized Baseball, also signs 1945 big-leaguers Nap Reyes and Adrián Zabala, both native Cubans, away from the Giants, and Luis Olmo, who hails from Puerto Rico, away from the Brooklyn Dodgers.
- February 26 – The war between the Mexican League and Organized Baseball intensifies when Gerardo Pasquel, brother of league president Jorge Pasquel, says his circuit has set aside USD $40 million to lure American players. "We have the money to pay them ... If American club owners think they have lost some players, they will be in for a big surprise in March."

=== March ===
- March 7 – Negro leaguer Marvin Williams, playing for the Sabios de Vargas against the Navegantes del Magallanes, sets a still-standing Venezuelan League mark by driving in eight runs on two home runs and two singles, while leading Vargas to a 16–9 victory.
- March 17 – Four thousand fans cram into City Island Park, Daytona Beach, to witness Jackie Robinson make baseball history by appearing in the lineup for his Montreal Royals against the parent Brooklyn Dodgers—the first time in the 20th century in which a black ballplayer will take the field with and against whites in an exhibition game for which admission is charged. He goes hitless but steals a base and scores a run.
- March 18
  - The Dodgers pare down their roster, releasing outfielder/third baseman Frenchy Bordagaray, 36, and selling the contract of shortstop Claude Corbitt, 30, to the Cincinnati Reds.
  - The Negro National League votes to ban All-Star southpaw Tom Glover, formerly of the Baltimore Elite Giants, for five years for "jumping" his contract to sign with the Industriales de Monterrey of the "outlaw" Mexican Baseball League. The NNL's suspension foreshadows the punishments that will soon be levied by Commissioner Happy Chandler against major- and minor-leaguers who do the same.
- March 21 – Citing laws that mandate racial segregation at city facilities, officials in Jacksonville, Florida, notify the Brooklyn Dodgers that Jackie Robinson and Johnny Wright of the Dodgers' Montreal Royals farm club will not be permitted to play among whites in an upcoming spring training game. Jacksonville becomes the first city to enforce "Jim Crow laws." Rather than comply, Branch Rickey responds by cancelling the game; however more cities, including Savannah and Richmond, will issue similar bans—and game cancellations will follow—before the Royals start their season.
- March 29
  - A rejuvenated Minor League Baseball begins its first post-World War II season with 43 active leagues ranging from Class D to Triple-A, the most since 1940. By contrast, only 12 leagues had competed in 1945, the last wartime season.
    - The new Triple-A classification reflects a change in nomenclature, with the Double-A level of 1912–1945 given a new identity and its three circuits—the American Association, International League and Pacific Coast League—elevated to the new level. Similarly, the 1946-and-beyond Double-A classification is a renaming of the Class A1 level of 1936–1945.
    - Established leagues that were dormant during the war, such as the Texas League (now Double-A), Sally League (now Class A), and Three-I League (Class B), spring back into life. The postwar boom is especially strong year-over-year in Class B, which quadruples in membership from two leagues (1945) to eight (1946); Class C, which grows from one member league to 11; and Class D, which also quadruples, from four to 17 leagues.
- March 30
  - The upstart Mexican League appears to score its biggest coup yet when the St. Louis Browns' holdout slugger/shortstop, Vern Stephens, signs with the Azules de Veracruz, owned by the league's president, Jorge Pasquel. Stephens, only 25, is already a two-time All-Star coming off leading the American League in runs batted in (109 in 1944), then home runs (24 in 1945). Stephens has been offered $13,000 by the cash-poor Brownies, well short of his salary demand of $17,500. Pasquel's counter-offer: $175,000.
  - The 16 big-league clubs continue to cut their rosters to prepare for the mid-April start of their season. Under special rules created for this first post-war campaign, teams can keep 36 men on their varsity squads until June 15, then 30 through August 31. The month of March sees 20 MLB and ex-MLB players handed their unconditional releases.
    - One of six players released today is the real-life Lawrence "Crash" Davis, 26, an infielder and Duke University alumnus who appeared in 148 games between 1940 and 1942 for the Philadelphia Athletics before spending 1943–1945 serving in the United States Navy. His MLB career over, Davis will find a job with the Lawrence Millionaires of the New England League in 1946—but "Crash Davis" will be immortalized when his name is borrowed by ex-ballplayer turned film director Ron Shelton and bestowed on leading man Kevin Costner in the hit, baseball-themed, romantic comedy Bull Durham (1988).
- March 31 – Three American-born members of the New York Giants join the exodus to the Mexican League: pitcher Sal Maglie, 28, first baseman Roy Zimmerman, 32, and second baseman George Hausmann, 29. All "jump" their existing contracts in search of higher compensation; each sign for "a $5,000 bonus and twice as much pay."

=== April ===
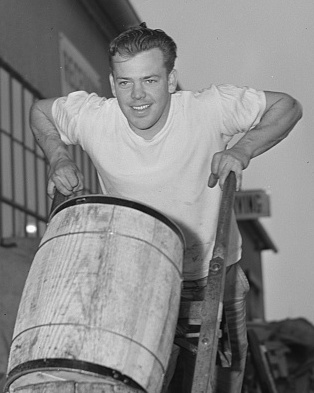
Vern Stephens, during his off-season wartime job at California Shipbuilding Corporation in Los Angeles Harbor (1943)

- April 4 – The Brooklyn Dodgers assign the contracts of their third and fourth African-American players, pitcher Don Newcombe, 19, and catcher Roy Campanella, 24, to their newly founded Nashua affiliate in the Class B New England League. Campanella, called by the Dodgers the "best catcher in the Negro leagues", had signed with Brooklyn March 18 after playing for the Baltimore Elite Giants last season; Newcombe, whose signing is revealed today, was 3–3 (2.60) for the Newark Eagles in 1945.
- April 5 – After only two games with the Azules de Veracruz, unhappy shortstop Vern Stephens "re-defects" to his old team, the St. Louis Browns, when Browns' scout Jack Fournier and Stephens' father, Vern Sr., meet him in Monterrey and swiftly drive him back over the border. He signs with St. Louis for $17,000 and returns the money Jorge Pasquel had advanced to him. By signing, Stephens avoids punishment from "Organized Baseball," where Commissioner Happy Chandler is already vowing to impose heavy suspensions on "contract jumpers."
- April 7 – In Sanford, Florida, an exhibition game between the Brooklyn Dodgers' two Triple-A affiliates, the Montreal Royals and St. Paul Saints, is interrupted in the third inning when the local sheriff orders Montreal manager Clay Hopper to remove Jackie Robinson from his lineup. Robinson's playing among whites violates Jim Crow laws. To avoid possible arrests, Hopper complies.
- April 12 – Unlike Vern Stephens, another high-profile Mexican League defector, catcher Mickey Owen, affirms his decision to join the outlaw circuit after nearly returning to his old team, the Brooklyn Dodgers. Owen, 30, is a 4x National League All-Star (1941–1944). Arriving in Mexico City today, Owen says he has been subjected to intense pressure to remain in Organized Baseball—including threats from Dodger president Branch Rickey to make him a "whipping boy" to discourage other American players from following Owen's example.
- April 15 – The St. Louis Cardinals continue to shed excess playing talent, selling the contract of first baseman Ray Sanders to the Boston Braves for $25,000. With ex-Redbird manager Billy Southworth now in charge of the Braves, his penchant for acquiring former players causes local sportswriters to nickname Boston's NL club "the Cape Cod Cardinals."
- April 16 – A full slate of games opens the 1946 big-league season and the post-war "Baseball Boom" begins. Almost 239,000 fans attend the eight contests, an average of 29,840, with the reigning world champion Detroit Tigers raising their banner at Briggs Stadium before the day's largest reported crowd (52,900). By season's end, total MLB attendance will soar to a new record of 18.5 million, shattering the old mark of 11 million set in 1945.
  - The Tigers defeat the St. Louis Browns, 2–1, behind last year's American League MVP, future Hall of Famer Hal Newhouser.
  - Bob Feller of the Cleveland Indians marks the six-year anniversary of his Opening Day 1940 no-hitter against the Chicago White Sox by shutting out the Pale Hose on three hits at Comiskey Park, 1–0. "Rapid Robert" walks one and fans ten.
  - Boston's Braves Field opens to the public after a winter of renovations, costing over $500,000 ($8 million in 2025), ordered by the team's new ownership. Among them, the 31-year-old stadium is equipped with arc lights for night baseball—surpassing nearby Fenway Park, which won't install them until 1947—and its grandstand seats are given a fresh coat of dark green paint. The home team celebrates Opening Day by defeating the Brooklyn Dodgers, 5–3, behind Johnny Sain before 19,482. However, the game is marred when 13,000 spectators complain that their clothes have been stained from the freshly painted seats, which haven't dried in the chilly, damp New England weather. The Braves pay the cleaning bills for all who submit them, which adds another $6,000 ($99,000 in 2025) to the renovation project's cost.
  - Player–manager Mel Ott of the New York Giants hits his 511th and final career home run, victimizing Oscar Judd of the Philadelphia Phillies, in the first inning of New York's 8–4 win at the Polo Grounds.
- April 17 – Labor attorney and Harvard Law School graduate Robert F. Murphy formally launches the American Baseball Guild, the fourth attempt to unionize major-league players since 1885, and the first since World War I. Murphy claims he has sounded out players during spring training and discovered "substantial" support for his venture.

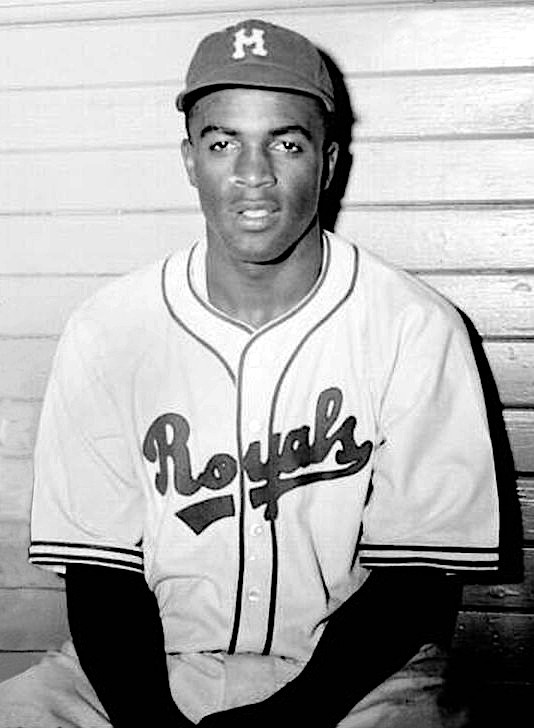
Jackie Robinson in 1946

- April 18 – Jackie Robinson makes his first appearance for the Montreal Royals of the International League, breaking the color barrier in the minor leagues. Against the Jersey City Giants at a standing-room-only Roosevelt Stadium, he lashes four hits, including a three-run homer, in five at bats, scores four runs, and steals two bases; Montreal wins, 14–1. The official paid attendance—51,873—is more than twice the stadium's capacity of 24,500.
- April 21 – In the first game of doubleheader at Fenway Park, the Boston Red Sox erase 7–0 and 10–5 deficits to defeat the Philadelphia Athletics, 12–11, in ten innings. The second game is called by darkness after five full innings at the still-light-less ballpark with the Athletics ahead 3–0; the defeat is the Bosox' first of 1946.
- April 23
  - Ed Head pitches a no-hitter as the Brooklyn Dodgers blank the Boston Braves, 5–0, at Ebbets Field. Head walks three and fans two.
  - A special "Committee on Old Timers" names 11 men to the Baseball Hall of Fame in Cooperstown. The honorees include the three immortalized members of the Chicago Cubs' early-century infield—Joe Tinker, Johnny Evers and Frank Chance—plus pitcher/manager/owner Clark Griffith and fellow hurlers Jack Chesbro, Joe McGinnity, Eddie Plank, Rube Waddell and Ed Walsh, and outfielders Jesse Burkett and Tommy McCarthy.
- April 24 – Cleveland Indians catcher Frankie Hayes's MLB record for consecutive games caught ends at 312 when rookie Sherm Lollar starts behind the plate in Cleveland's 5–1 victory over the St. Louis Browns at Sportsman's Park. Hayes's skein had begun October 2, 1943, ironically when he played for the Browns; he then started 155 out of 155 games in 1944 for the Philadelphia Athletics, 151 of 151 contests in 1945 for the Athletics and Indians, and Cleveland's first four games of 1946. Of those 312 games started, Hayes registered 267 complete games and 2,6392/3 innings caught.
- April 30 – Bob Feller tosses the second no-hitter of his career in a 1–0 Cleveland win over the New York Yankees in the Bronx. Feller walks five and fans 11; catcher Frankie Hayes' solo homer in the ninth off Bill Bevens is the game's only run. Feller also will fire two one-hitters in 1946, on July 31 and August 8, and compile a stretch of 33 consecutive scoreless innings pitched.

=== May ===
- May 1 – The St. Louis Cardinals obtain well-traveled catcher Clyde Kluttz from the Philadelphia Phillies for infielder Emil Verban. In a separate trade earlier today, Kluttz, 28, had been acquired by the Phils from the New York Giants for outfielder Vince DiMaggio.
- May 5 – At Wrigley Field, eight hits, two errors, a walk and a hit batsman enable the Chicago Cubs to score 11 seventh-inning runs, and go on to a 13–1 thumping of the Philadelphia Phillies in the first game of a doubleheader.
- May 10
  - The fast-starting Boston Red Sox win their 15th consecutive game, defeating the New York Yankees, 5–4, in The Bronx. Dominic DiMaggio drives in the winning run in the seventh inning in the come-from-behind victory. Boston is now 21–3, 5½ games ahead of New York in the early weeks of the American League season.
  - At Shibe Park, a 1 a.m. curfew lowers the curtain on a 15-inning, five-all deadlock between the Washington Senators and Philadelphia Athletics. The contest goes into the books as a tie (one of nine stalemates to be recorded in MLB this season) and individual statistics will count; however, the game must be replayed in its entirety later in the season.
- May 11 – Braves Field's eventful season continues when it hosts Boston's first-ever night baseball game. A crowd of 35,945 fans—the Braves' largest since 1933—sees the home side drop a 5–1 decision to the New York Giants. Boston players, like their Brooklyn Dodger counterparts, will wear satin uniforms for night games, designed to shimmer under the lights.
- May 14 – The Montréal Royals send pitcher Johnny Wright to Class C Trois-Rivières of the Canadian–American League, and sign former Philadelphia Stars hurler Roy Partlow, 34, as a free agent. Wright and Partlow are both African-Americans who are briefly teammates of Jackie Robinson's on the Triple-A Royals. Partlow, like Wright, will pitch infrequently for Montréal and spend most of 1946 with Trois–Rivières, where they go a combined 22–9 to help win the Can–Am League pennant and playoff title. Both will return to the Negro leagues in 1947.
- May 18
  - The Philadelphia Athletics trade 23-year-old third baseman George Kell to the Detroit Tigers for outfielder Barney McCosky, 29. In Detroit, Kell will blossom into a star, making the AL All-Star team five consecutive years (1947–1951), winning a batting title (1949), and burnishing his credentials for the Hall of Fame (elected 1983); then, after his career, he'll become a beloved member of the Tigers' broadcasting team.
  - The Chicago Cubs become the first team in Major League history to score six runs in the first and ninth innings of a game, when defeating the New York Giants 19–3.
- May 19
  - To make room for Kell, the Tigers sell the contract of veteran third baseman Pinky Higgins to the first-place Boston Red Sox. Higgins, 36, formerly played for Boston in 1937–1938, batting over .300 each season and driving in 212 runs. Although 1946 will be his final MLB season, he'll help the Red Sox break their 28-year pennant drought, hitting .275 in 64 games, then become an influential friend of owner Tom Yawkey's, and eventually the Red Sox' manager (1955–1959, 1960–1962) and general manager (1962–1965).
  - Mickey Vernon of the Washington Senators hits for the cycle in a 7–1 Washington victory at Comiskey Park over the Chicago White Sox. It's the first of two "cycles" in the majors in 1946; Ted Williams will author the second on July 21 at Fenway Park. Coincidentally, Vernon (.353) and Williams (.342) will finish 1–2 in the contest for the AL batting title.

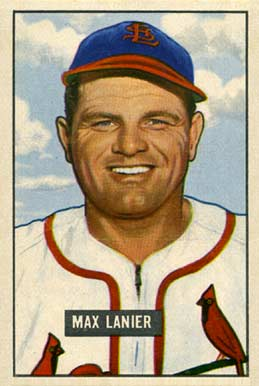
Max Lanier

- May 23
  - The insurgent Mexican League deals another haymaker to "Organized Baseball" when, five weeks into the National League season, three members of the pennant-contending St. Louis Cardinals (who today are 19–10 and tied with the Brooklyn Dodgers for first place) abandon them and head "South of the Border" in search of higher pay. The three—who will face punitive suspensions from Commissioner of Baseball Happy Chandler—are:
    - Left-handed starting pitcher Max Lanier, 31, who in six starts had delivered six complete-game victories, including two shutouts, with an ERA of 1.93.
    - Infielder Lou Klein, 27, a standout 1943 rookie who is losing his starting second-base job to future Hall of Famer Red Schoendienst.
    - Starter/reliever Fred Martin, a 30-year-old rookie who is 2–1 (4.08) with two complete-game victories and two games finished in six games.
  - Eventually, Chandler levies five-year suspensions on the 22 players who've "jumped" to the Mexican loop: Ace Adams, Alex Carrasquel, Bobby Estalella, Harry Feldman, Moe Franklin, Danny Gardella, Roland Gladu, José "Chili" Gómez, George Hausmann, Red Hayworth, Salvador "Chico" Hernández, Klein, Lanier, Sal Maglie, Martin, René Monteagudo, Luis Olmo, Roberto Ortiz, Mickey Owen, Nap Reyes, Adrián Zabala and Roy Zimmerman.
- May 24
  - Future Hall-of-Fame manager Joe McCarthy, 59, resigns from the New York Yankees after his 15-plus seasons have produced eight AL pennants, seven World Series titles, and a 1,460–867–21 (.627) regular-season record. Veteran catcher Bill Dickey, 38, a future Hall of Famer himself, is immediately named McCarthy's successor. His letter of resignation cites ill health (reported to be a gall-bladder condition) as the "sole reason" for McCarthy's retirement, but "meddling" by new Yankees co-owner Larry MacPhail and a serious alcohol binge will also be suggested as causes for his decision. The Yanks are 22–13 and five games behind the Boston Red Sox when the change is made.
  - Another veteran AL manager, Jimmy Dykes of the Chicago White Sox, steps down today, with Ted Lyons, a Hall-of-Fame pitcher still active at age 45, taking over the team. Dykes, 49, has helmed the White Sox since May 9, 1934, compiling a 899–940–11 (.489) record. The 899 triumphs are most in team history, but his club is only 10–20 this season and only had five over-.500 seasons during Dykes' 13-year reign.
- May 28 – The Washington Senators defeat the New York Yankees, 2–1, in the first night game ever played at Yankee Stadium. Before 49,917 fans, knuckleball artist Dutch Leonard throws a complete-game victory, and knocks in the visitors' winning run with a fourth-inning single. The lights, which Yankee boss and night-baseball pioneer Larry MacPhail says are the brightest to be found at any other MLB ballpark, are the focal point of an $800,000 ($13.7 million in 2026 dollars) renovation of the 23-year-old "House That Ruth Built."

=== June ===
- June 7 — The Pittsburgh Pirates' 36 active players vote 20–16 to authorize a strike rather than take the field against the New York Giants after club president William Benswanger refuses to negotiate with the American Baseball Guild, a nascent trade union. However, the union needs a two-thirds "yes" vote (24 players with 1946's expanded rosters) to legally authorize a job action. Thus the strike vote falls short, dealing the Guild a lethal blow. In August, owners will offer minor concessions to players and effectively stave off the creation of a union until 1966.
- June 8 – At Sportsman's Park, rookie Del Ennis's eighth-inning single is the only blemish on what would have been Red Barrett's perfect game as the St. Louis Cardinals blank the Philadelphia Phillies, 7–0. Barrett fans three.
- June 9
  - Ted Williams blasts a pitch from the Detroit Tigers' Fred Hutchinson over the bullpens in Fenway Park's right field that's hit so far that, when it returns to earth—502 feet (153 m) from home plate—it breaks the hat of a startled fan from Albany, New York, who's taking in the game. Williams calls the homer "as long as I've ever hit one." The seat will be painted red in the park's bleachers to commemorate its landing spot.
  - The Boston Braves purchase the contract of their second 29-year-old outfielder in six days, acquiring Danny Litwhiler from the St. Louis Cardinals. Earlier, on June 3, the Braves had obtained Mike McCormick from the Cincinnati Reds in a cash transaction. Upon Litwhiler's playing retirement, he'll become a celebrated U.S. college baseball coach at Florida State and Michigan State universities from 1955 through 1982.
  - Mel Ott of the New York Giants is the first manager to be ejected from both games of a doubleheader, when the Giants lose both games to the Pittsburgh Pirates.
- June 14
  - Pitcher–manager Ted Lyons of the Chicago White Sox is released from his playing contract. The future Hall of Famer, 45, retires with a 260–230 record and 3.67 ERA in 594 games, all with the ChiSox. This season, as his team's "Sunday pitcher", he's 1–4 (2.32) with five complete games in five starts.
  - The Philadelphia Athletics purchase the contract of third baseman Hank Majeski from the New York Yankees. He'll be a key part of the Athletics' brief revival of 1947–1949.
- June 15
  - The Brooklyn Dodgers trade veteran second baseman Billy Herman to the Boston Braves for catcher Stew Hofferth.
  - The Washington Senators trade hard-hitting outfielder Jeff Heath to the St. Louis Browns for pitcher Al LaMacchia and outfielder Joe Grace.
- June 20 – Sam Breadon, owner of the St. Louis Cardinals, flies to Mexico City to meet face-to-face with Jorge Pasquel, whose Mexican League has enticed 22 MLB players to flee the reserve clause in their contracts and join his circuit. Among the 22 are three key Cardinals—Max Lanier, Lou Klein and Fred Martin—who "jumped" Breadon's team four weeks ago. Breadon, who made the trip without permission from the National League or the Commissioner's office, refuses to reveal the substance of his talks with Pasquel. Happy Chandler fines Breadon $5,000 for insubordination.
- June 22 – The Hall-of-Fame big-league career of showman owner Bill Veeck begins when his syndicate purchases the Cleveland Indians of the American League from Alva Bradley and partners for between $1.6 and $2 million. Veeck leads a largely Chicago-based investor group that also includes entertainer and former Clevelander Bob Hope. Only 32, Veeck formerly owned the Milwaukee Brewers of the American Association, where he was known for his relentless promotions and stunts designed to entertain fans in the grandstands.
- June 24 – The team bus carrying the Spokane Indians of the Western International League crashes on Snoqualmie Pass in Washington State in the worst transit accident in the history of U.S. professional sports as of June 2025. Nine members of the team, including player–manager Mel Cole, are killed and six are injured. Eight of the victims served in World War II.
- June 25 – Veteran slugger Joe Medwick, 34, signs as a free agent with the Brooklyn Dodgers, his third team of 1946. On the sidelines since the St. Louis Browns released him April 5, Medwick shakes off the rust to bat .318 with an OPS of .811 as a pinch-hitter and spare outfielder for the Dodgers.
- June 26 – In one of the American League's longest games of the year, the visiting Washington Senators outlast the Chicago White Sox, 4–3, in 16 innings. The winning pitcher, Sid Hudson, scores the winning run on third baseman Bob Kennedy's error.

=== July ===
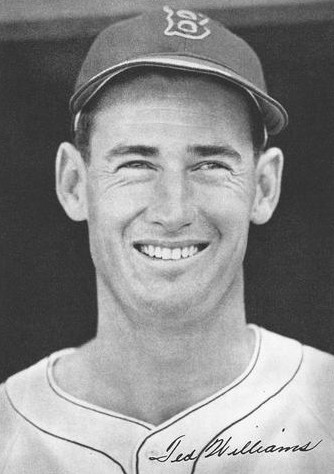
Ted Williams

- July 7 – The All-Star break, which marks the midpoint of the 1946 season, sees the Brooklyn Dodgers (48–26) five games ahead of the St. Louis Cardinals (43–31) in the National League, and the Boston Red Sox (54–23) 7½ lengths ahead of the New York Yankees (47–31) in the American League.
- July 9
  - At Fenway Park, the American League crushes the National League, 12–0, in the All-Star Game. Red Sox superstar Ted Williams goes four-for-four, including two home runs, scores four times, and knocks in five. One of his blasts comes off Rip Sewell of the Pittsburgh Pirates—the first and only time Sewell's famed "eephus pitch" is belted for a home run.
  - The first-place Red Sox bolster their bench strength by purchasing the contract of infielder Don Gutteridge from the St. Louis Browns. Gutteridge, 34, has spent the early weeks of the 1946 season as the player–manager of the Browns' Triple-A affiliate in Toledo.
- July 12 – Johnny Sain of the Boston Braves one-hits the Cincinnati Reds at Crosley Field. Grady Hatton's first-inning double is Cincinnati's only safety, and Sain sets down the Reds' final 25 hitters in order. Bama Rowell scores Boston's run on an RBI infield single by Johnny Hopp.
- July 14 – Player-manager Lou Boudreau of the Cleveland Indians hits four doubles and one home run, but Ted Williams wallops three homers and drives in eight runs, as the Boston Red Sox top the Indians, 11–10. In the Sox second-game win, the famous Boudreau Shift is born. Boudreau shifts all his players, except the third baseman and left fielder, to the right side of the diamond in an effort to stop Williams. Ted grounds out and walks twice while ignoring the shift; Boston sweeps the twin bill, 6–4.
- July 15 – The Indians send former "iron man" catcher Frankie Hayes to the Chicago White Sox as the "player to be named later" in an earlier transaction in which Cleveland obtained fellow catcher Tom Jordan from Chicago.
- July 18 – The slumping Brooklyn Dodgers fall to the Cincinnati Reds for their eighth loss in nine tilts since the All-Star Game; now 49–34, they drop into second place, a half game behind the St. Louis Cardinals (50–34), who are 7–3 since the break, including a four-game sweep of Brooklyn at Sportsman's Park from July 14–16.
- July 19 – Four players and one coach from the visiting Chicago White Sox are ejected by umpires Red Jones and Bill Summers for "bench jockeying" in the third inning of a game against the Boston Red Sox. When the heckling of the arbiters continues, the remaining White Sox players on the bench are ordered to the clubhouse—but are eligible to play in the contest if needed. The result leaves leaving only manager Ted Lyons, two coaches, and the nine players in the lineup in Chicago's dugout when the team is on defense. The ChiSox bullpen also remains eligible for the game. The Red Sox win, 9–2.
- July 23 – The Red Sox strengthen their outfield, purchasing the contract of 12-year veteran Wally Moses from the White Sox. Left-handed hitter Moses, 35, will start three games of the 1946 World Series in right field and go five-for-13 (.385) at the plate.
- July 27 – At Briggs Stadium, the Detroit Tigers' future Hall-of-Fame southpaw Hal Newhouser wins his 20th game of 1946, handcuffing the Philadelphia Athletics, 4–2. He allows eight hits and fans eight in his 20th complete game of the year. Newhouser will lead American League hurlers in games won (26; his third straight campaign with 25 or more victories), earned run average (1.94) and strikeouts per nine innings pitched (8.457).

=== August ===
- August 2 – In what will be a characteristic act during his early career as an owner, Bill Veeck, who bought the Cleveland Indians six weeks ago, signs free-agent, minor-league shortstop Jackie Price, released by the Triple-A Oakland Oaks earlier in 1946 after batting .171. But Price, 33, is more known as a stuntman, acrobat and baseball clown than as a ballplayer. He'll appear in only seven games as a shortstop and pinch hitter through September 20, but entertain Cleveland fans with his unique talents.
- August 4 – St. Louis Browns relief pitcher Tom Ferrick earns the win in both games of a doubleheader with the Philadelphia Athletics.
- August 8 – The Pittsburgh Pirates are sold by the heirs of Barney Dreyfuss, who owned them from 1900 until his 1932 death, to a four-member group headed by Indiana banker, politician and minor-league team owner Frank E. McKinney, and including real-estate magnate John W. Galbreath, entertainer Bing Crosby and Pittsburgh attorney Thomas P. Johnson. The reported purchase price is $2.5 million.
- August 9 – All eight big-league games are played at night for the first time in MLB annals.
- August 15 – Sam Chapman slugs three home runs off Joe Dobson, pacing the Philadelphia Athletics, tail-enders in the Junior Circuit, to a 5–3 victory over the first-place Boston Red Sox at Shibe Park.
- August 18 – Paul Erickson of the Chicago Cubs one-hits the Pittsburgh Pirates 8–0 at Wrigley Field. A seventh-inning single by Billy Cox spoils Erickson's no-no. The game features a bizarre dispute in which the Pirates argue that home-plate umpire Lou Jorda forgot the ball-strike count and awarded a walk to a Cubs' hitter after only three balls.

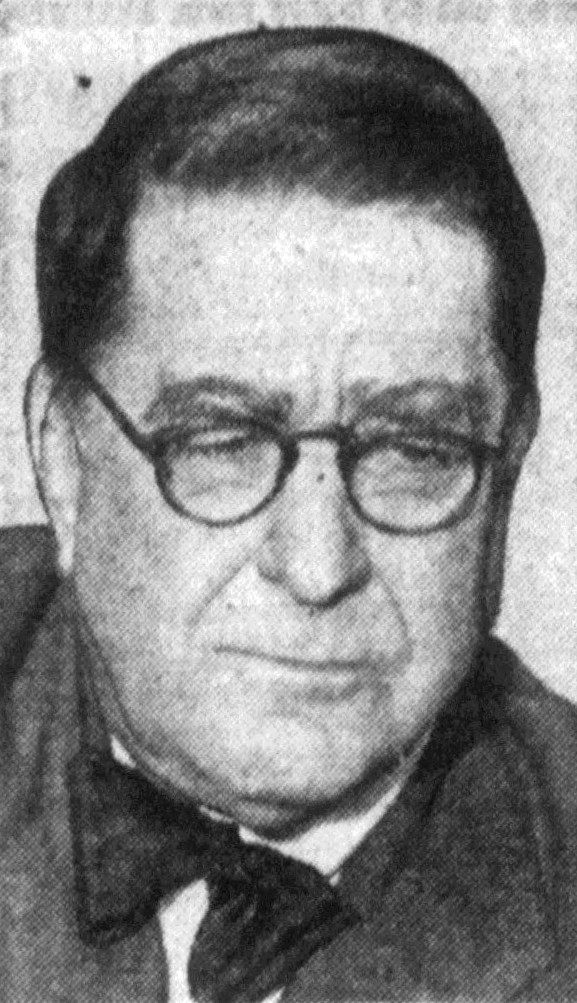
Branch Rickey

- August 27
  - A six-member subcommittee, including both league presidents and two owners from each circuit, presents an explosive—and top secret—report to all 16 MLB magnates dealing with highly charged topics such as the shaky legality of the reserve clause, the Mexican League raids and recent unsuccessful player unionization effort by the American Baseball Guild, and the threatened racial integration of the major leagues.
    - The report, nicknamed after the subcommittee chair, Larry MacPhail of the New York Yankees, warns that the reserve clause must be amended to avoid being overturned in court. It advocates establishment of a pension plan to improve labor relations and fend off future union organizing among MLB players.
    - It also argues fiercely against breaking the baseball color line, offering five reasons why the major leagues must remain all-white—including the argument that black fans thronging to MLB games in venues like New York and Chicago will depress the market value of the clubs in those cities.
    - According to some statements from then-Commissioner Happy Chandler and then-Brooklyn Dodgers president Branch Rickey, owners will approve the MacPhail Report, 15–1. The lone dissenter: Rickey, who signed Jackie Robinson to a Triple-A contract last October and other young black players this season.
  - On the field of play, at Sportsman's Park, Rickey's Dodgers rack up 16 hits and starting pitcher Kirby Higbe wins his 13th game, enabling Brooklyn to tie their arch-rival St. Louis Cardinals in the NL pennant race. Both clubs are 75–47, with 32 games to play. The Chicago Cubs are third, eight games out.
- August 31 – Luke Sewell, who led the 1944 St. Louis Browns to the first American League pennant in their history, hands over the team's managerial reins to interim pilot James "Zack" Taylor. Sewell, 45, steps down with a winning record (432–410–8, .513) over all or part of six seasons; he's one of the few Browns' skippers who will finish above .500 for his tenure there.

=== September ===
- September 2 – After today's Labor Day doubleheaders, the 81–49 St. Louis Cardinals (who sweep the Cincinnati Reds) increase their National League lead to 2½ games over the 78–51 Brooklyn Dodgers (who split with the Philadelphia Phillies). Meanwhile, in the American League, the 94–40 Boston Red Sox sweep the second-place, 77–54 New York Yankees to move 15½ games out in front; they're coasting to the club's first AL pennant since 1918.
- September 3 – Detroit Tigers starting pitcher Virgil Trucks goes 151/3 innings at Comiskey Park against the Chicago White Sox, but leaves with a 3–2 lead and the tying run on third in the home half of the 16th. Reliever Stubby Overmire then allows back-to-back doubles to Whitey Platt and Taffy Wright, and the ChiSox come away with a 4–3 come-from-behind triumph.
- September 7 – Future Hall-of-Fame catcher Ernie Lombardi's second-inning solo homer is the only hit allowed by starter Kirby Higbe, and the Brooklyn Dodgers defeat Lombardi's New York Giants, 4–1, at Ebbets Field to tighten the NL pennant race. The Dodgers now trail the St. Louis Cardinals by 1½ games.
- September 11
  - Two marathon games end in ties in the National League.
    - At Ebbets Field, the Cincinnati Reds and Brooklyn Dodgers battle to a 19-inning, scoreless stalemate before the game is halted by a curfew. The second-division Reds' Johnny Vander Meer throws 15 shutout innings before leaving for reliever Harry Gumbert. It's the second-longest scoreless tie in history. The game will be fully replayed September 20 in Brooklyn, and the pennant-contending Dodgers will win, 5–3.
    - At Braves Field, the Chicago Cubs and Boston play to a 17-inning, 3–3 tie.

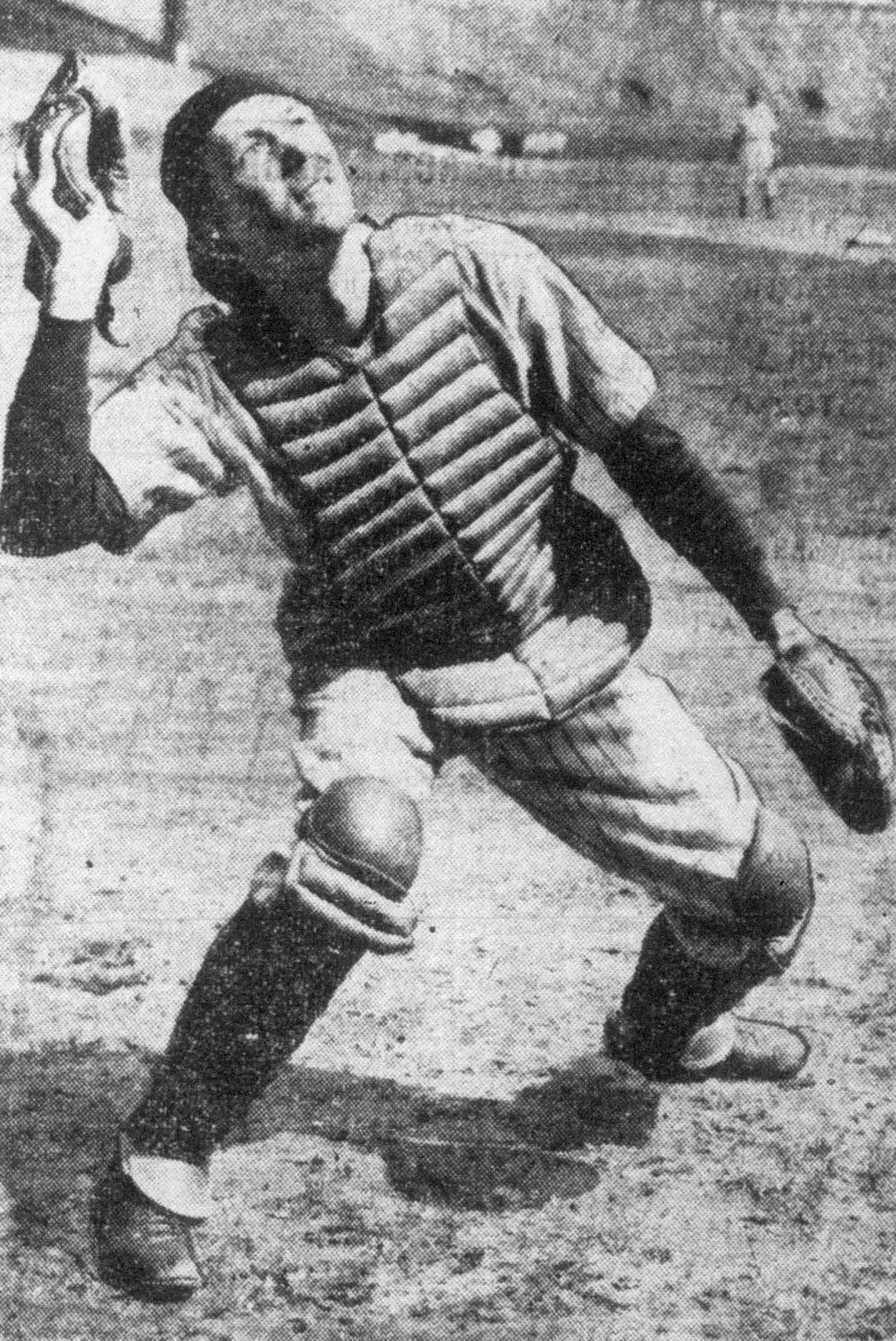
Bill Dickey in 1943

- September 12 – Managerial turmoil, unusual for the normally staid franchise, continues for the New York Yankees, as Bill Dickey informs co-owner and club president Larry MacPhail that he doesn't want to return for 1947. New York is 79–61 and a distant third in American League; they're 57–48 under Dickey. His resignation also ends Dickey's Hall-of-Fame playing career; he has been a pinch hitter for most of his nearly four-month-long managerial stint. He had taken over from legendary skipper Joe McCarthy on May 24 and his departure means the Yanks will have three different managers over the course of 1946.
- September 13
  - The Boston Red Sox clinch the AL pennant, edging the Cleveland Indians, 1–0, at Cleveland's League Park II on Ted Williams' inside-the-park home run, the only one of his career. Williams punches the ball over the shift when Cleveland left fielder Pat Seerey pulls in behind the shortstop position. It is Boston's seventh league title, and first since 1918.
  - Ironically, the arch-rival New York Yankees help the Bosox' cause by eliminating their nearest competitor in the race, the second-place Detroit Tigers, 5–4, at Briggs Stadium in Johnny Neun's first game as the Bombers' interim manager.
- September 14 – The new owners of the Pittsburgh Pirates hire H. Roy Hamey as their general manager, and shift former GM Ray Kennedy to farm system director. Hamey, 44, most recently was president of the Triple-A American Association, but is best known for his long service running the front office of the New York Yankees' Kansas City affiliate.
- September 16 – MLB owners, meeting again in New York only three weeks after their August 27–28 confab, revoke a decision taken at the August sessions to increase the regular season schedule from 154 to 168 games.
- September 21 – Muddy Ruel announces his resignation as assistant to Commissioner Happy Chandler to return to uniform as the field manager of the 1947 St. Louis Browns. Ruel, 50, spent 19 seasons as a catcher for six American League teams and holds a law degree from Washington University in St. Louis.
- September 25
  - Rookie Ralph Kiner, 23, drills his 23rd homer of 1946 to help his Pittsburgh Pirates to an eventual, 16-inning victory at Wrigley Field. His 23 long balls are enough to lead the National League this season, starting a streak in which Kiner will lead or co-lead the NL in home runs for seven consecutive years. Kiner will be elected to the Baseball Hall of Fame in 1975.
  - The Hall-of-Fame managerial career of Bill McKechnie ends just prior to the conclusion of his 25th season, when he and the Cincinnati Reds end their nine-year relationship. Since 1938, McKechnie, 60, has led the formerly hapless Reds to a 744–631–11 (.541) record, consecutive NL pennants (1939–1940), and the 1940 World Series title. Cincinnati is 64–86 today after Bucky Walters shuts out the St. Louis Cardinals 7–0 at Sportsman's Park. Coach Hank Gowdy, a longtime McKechnie aide, will finish 1946 as acting skipper; Johnny Neun, interim pilot of the New York Yankees, will be hired to take the Cincinnati helm for 1947.
- September 27 – The St. Louis Cardinals, sole owners of first place in the National League since August 28, fall into a dead heat with the idle Brooklyn Dodgers by dropping a 7–2 decision to the visiting Chicago Cubs. With two games left in the regular season, each team is 95–57. The Dodgers' record in September, so far, is 20–7; the Cardinals' is 17–9.
- September 28 – The month sees another managerial casualty when Frankie Frisch quits the Pittsburgh Pirates with three games remaining in the Bucs' season. Coach Spud Davis is temporarily handed the team's reins. Frisch, 49, has directed the Pirates to a 539–528 record since Opening Day 1940.
- September 29
  - The end of the regulation National League season results in the first flat-footed tie in the circuit's 71-year history when both the St. Louis Cardinals and Brooklyn Dodgers lose their final games and "finish" the year at 96–58. The teams will meet in an unprecedented, best-of-three tiebreaker series to determine the pennant-winner.
    - When the Dodgers win a coin-toss to determine home-field advantage, their risk-taking manager, Leo Durocher, opts to start the series on the road, in St. Louis, with Game 2 and Game 3 (if needed) to be played at Brooklyn's Ebbets Field. The Cardinals dominated the Dodgers 14–8 during the 154-game "regular" season (8–3 at Sportsman's Park), outscoring them 109–80.
  - Bouncing back from Buck O'Neil's game-trying home run, the Newark Eagles defeat O'Neil's Kansas City Monarchs, 3–2, to capture the 1946 Negro World Series in the seventh and deciding game, played in Newark. The Eagles triumph despite making only three hits, but one of them is Johnny Davis's two-RBI double.
- September 30 – Veteran second baseman Billy Herman, pitcher Elmer Singleton, infielder Whitey Wietelmann and outfielder Stan Wentzel are traded by the Boston Braves to the Pittsburgh Pirates for catcher Hank Camelli and third baseman Bob Elliott. The Pirates' new owners immediately hire the savvy Herman, 37 and a future Hall of Famer, as their player–manager for 1947, but they grossly overpay by giving up Elliott, who'll win the 1947 NL MVP Award and help lead Boston to the 1948 National League pennant.

=== October ===
- October 1
  - The St. Louis Cardinals and the Brooklyn Dodgers meet in the first-ever National League tie-breaker series. The best-of-three showdown is not a "postseason" event: it's an extension of the 154-game NL schedule, with all statistics counting toward regular-season totals.
    - Today's "Game 1" (actually #155 for St. Louis and #156 for Brooklyn) at St. Louis' Sportsman's Park sees Redbird southpaw Howie Pollet notch his 21st triumph of 1946, throwing a complete-game, 4–2 victory; two third-inning runs give the Cardinals an insurmountable 3–1 advantage and they travel to Brooklyn needing only one victory to seal the pennant.
  - Meanwhile, the American League champions, the Boston Red Sox, concerned about the negative impacts of a three-day layoff during the NL tie-breaker, schedule a three-game, "friendly" exhibition series against a team of AL "All-Stars" at Fenway Park, to stay sharp. Their strategy backfires spectacularly today, when, in Game 1, superstar Ted Williams is nicked on the right elbow by a Mickey Haefner curveball; he's taken to a hospital for X-rays and held out of the rest of the series. His sore elbow will be blamed for Williams' poor showing (five for 25, all singles, one run batted in) in the seven games of the 1946 World Series.
- October 3 – After a travel day, the 1946 NL tiebreaker resumes at Ebbets Field for "Game 2". The Cardinals' Murry Dickson spots the Dodgers a run in the bottom of the first, then shuts them out for the next seven innings, while the Redbirds score eight unanswered tallies before Brooklyn's bats awaken, too late, in the final frame. The Cardinals' 8–4 triumph delivers St. Louis's ninth National League flag in 21 years.
- October 4 – At Delorimier Downs, Montréal, the Montreal Royals, champions of the International League, defeat the American Association champion Louisville Colonels, 2–0, to capture the 1946 Junior World Series, four games to two. The Royals are this century's first racially integrated team in "organized" Minor League Baseball and feature Jackie Robinson, who—under tremendous pressure—helped his team post a regular-season record of 100–54 and won the International League's batting title (.349); then he bats .400 in the Junior Series. Robinson is given a hero's send-off by Montréal fans, who lift him to their shoulders and sing "Il a gagné ses épaulettes" ("He earned his laurels") after the game.
- October 11 – High-profile owners Bill Veeck and Larry MacPhail share today's spotlight with Game 5 of the 1946 World Series when Veeck's Cleveland Indians obtain six-time All-Star second baseman Joe Gordon from MacPhail's New York Yankees for starting pitcher Allie Reynolds. Gordon, 31, is a former (1942) AL MVP; he's bound for the Hall of Fame. Reynolds, 29, is only 51–47 (3.31) in all or parts of five years in Cleveland; he'll become a cornerstone of six world-champion pitching staffs and a 5x All-Star during his eight seasons in pinstripes.

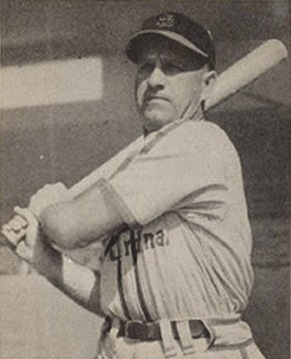
Enos Slaughter (1948)

- October 15 – At Sportsman's Park, the St. Louis Cardinals defeat the Boston Red Sox, 4–3, in Game 7 of the World Series to win their sixth World Series, four games to three. Harry Walker's eighth-inning double scores Enos Slaughter from first base with the decisive run, and Harry Brecheen's pitching continues to baffle the Bosox; previously the author of two, complete-game triumphs, "the Cat" wins today's game in relief and posts a dominant 3–0 (0.45) record in the Fall Classic, allowing only one run in three games and 20 innings of work. The Red Sox will not appear in a World Series for another 21 years, which, coincidentally, will be a rematch with the Cardinals.
- October 23 – At the Evangeline League (Class D) owners meeting, allegations are made that players from the Houma Indians and Abbeville Athletics had conspired with bookies to throw games during the league's final series.
- October 24 – The New York Yankees trade right-hander Tiny Bonham to the Pittsburgh Pirates for southpaw Cookie Cuccurullo. Bonham, 33, won 21 games for the 1942 Yankees but slumped to a 5–8 (3.70) mark in 18 games for the 1946 Bombers.
- October 26 – In his nationally syndicated newspaper column, influential journalist and commentator Westbrook Pegler alleges that Leo Durocher is associating with known gamblers and racketeers through his close friendship with actor George Raft. In a series of columns in the coming weeks, Pegler will continue to attack the Brooklyn Dodgers' manager (and Raft) as "threats to society."

=== November ===
- November 1 – Among the selections in the Rule 5 draft is first baseman Ferris Fain, 25, a future two-time batting champion, acquired by the Philadelphia Athletics from the San Francisco Seals of the Pacific Coast League.
- November 5 – After weeks of speculation, Bucky Harris is formally announced as manager of the 1947 Yankees. Harris, 49, the long-ago "Boy Wonder" as playing skipper of the 1924–1925 Washington Senators, has been serving as an aide to Yankees' co-owner, president and general manager Larry MacPhail since mid-September. His imminent hiring had been expected since then, but conflicting reports indicating that MacPhail secretly wanted to lure Leo Durocher away from the Brooklyn Dodgers had led to rumors and intrigue in baseball circles, a backdrop to the soon-to-happen public feud that ranges MacPhail against Durocher and Dodger boss Branch Rickey.
- November 14 – Ted Williams wins his first-ever BBWAA American League MVP Award. The 28-year-old "Splendid Splinter" helped his Boston Red Sox capture their first AL flag since 1918—the year of Williams' birth—leading his circuit in runs scored (142), bases on balls received (156), on-base percentage (.497), slugging percentage (.667), OPS (1.164), total bases (343) and bWAR (10.4); and coming in second to Mickey Vernon in batting average (.342), and second to Hank Greenberg in both home runs (38) and runs batted in (123). Williams receives nine of 24 first-place votes, and outdistances Hal Newhouser (three first-place votes), and teammate Bobby Doerr (five).
- November 22
  - Stan Musial, who turned 26 yesterday, wins the second National League MVP Award of his five-year career. He takes 22 of 24 first-place votes, with Enos Slaughter, his teammate on the world champion St. Louis Cardinals, collecting the other two top nods. Musial led the Senior Circuit in runs scored (124), hits (228), doubles (50), triples (20), batting (.365), slugging percentage (.587), OPS (1.021), total bases (366) and bWAR (9.3). Musial previously was 1943's NL MVP.
  - Commissioner of Baseball Happy Chandler meets one on one with Leo Durocher at an Oakland country club to warn the Brooklyn Dodgers' manager to avoid George Raft and gambling and underworld figures such as Bugsy Siegel and Joe Adonis, or face discipline. Durocher agrees to comply with Chandler's warning; however, he reveals that he's romantically involved with Hollywood starlet Laraine Day—who is married to another man. Two weeks later, their adulterous affair hits the headlines when, during her divorce hearing, Day's estranged husband publicly accuses Durocher of stealing his wife's affections.

=== December ===
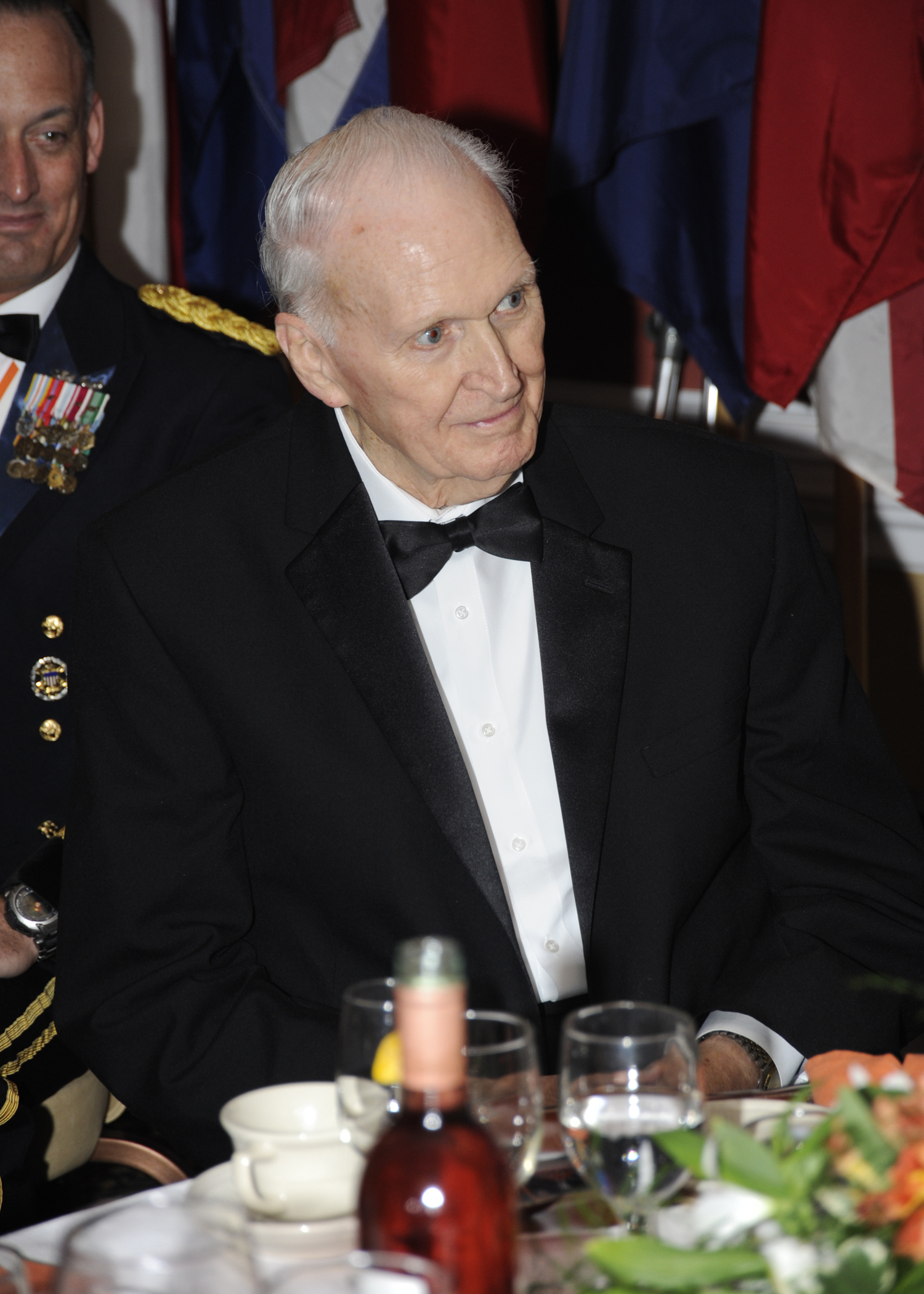
Lou Brissie in 2009

- December 4
  - The Brooklyn Dodgers deal outfielder Augie Galan to the Cincinnati Reds for pitcher Ed Heusser. Galan, 34, shared Brooklyn's left-field job with Pete Reiser during 1946 and batted .310 in 99 games.
  - George Trautman, 56, general manager (GM) of the Detroit Tigers for only 11 months, succeeds William G. Bramham as president of the National Association of Professional Baseball Leagues, the governing body of minor league baseball. Billy Evans, 62, former umpire and GM of the Cleveland Indians (1927–1935) replaces Trautman in Detroit's front office on December 16.
- December 5 – The Chicago White Sox sign pitcher Red Ruffing as a free agent. Future Hall of Famer Ruffing, 41, was released by the New York Yankees on September 20 after going 321–124 (3.47) in 15 seasons in the Bronx.
- December 6 – The Yankees and Cleveland Indians make another off-season trade, with the Bombers sending pitchers Gene Bearden and Al Gettel and outfielder Hal Peck to Cleveland for catcher Sherm Lollar and second baseman Ray Mack. Bearden will become key to the Indians' 1948 world-championship season.
- December 7 – Cleveland remains active in the trade market, obtaining veteran catcher Al López from the Pittsburgh Pirates for young outfielder Gene Woodling. López, 38, is a former National League All-Star who has caught 1,861 games in the Senior Circuit since 1928.
- December 9
  - The St. Louis Cardinals sell the contract of right-hander Red Barrett to the Boston Braves. Barrett, 31, had won 23 games for the 1945 Cardinals after St. Louis had acquired him from Boston in a May 23, 1945 trade.
  - The Philadelphia Phillies purchase the contract of knuckleball hurler Dutch Leonard from the Washington Senators.
- December 11 – The New York Yankees sign veteran National League slugger Joe Medwick, now a spare outfielder and pinch hitter, as a free agent. Medwick, 35, had been released by the Brooklyn Dodgers on October 9. The Yankees will release the future Hall of Famer on April 29, 1947, without using him in any American League games.
- December 15 – The Philadelphia Athletics sign amateur free agent pitcher and war veteran Lou Brissie. During his World War II service, the 22-year-old southpaw was badly wounded in action during the Italian campaign on December 7, 1944; he required 40 blood transfusions and 23 operations, including the insertion of a metal plate in his left leg, to repair his injuries. Pitching with the aid of a leg brace, Brissie will win 23 games for Savannah of the Sally League in 1947 and make his MLB debut on September 28. He'll appear in 234 games over his seven-season big-league career and be selected to the 1949 AL All-Star team.
- December 16 – The St. Louis Browns send Frank Mancuso to the Washington Senators for fellow catcher Jake Early.
- December 26 – Catcher Clyde Kluttz joins his fourth NL club of calendar year 1946 when the St. Louis Cardinals sell his contract to the Pittsburgh Pirates. Future MLB scout and executive Kluttz, 29, started the season with the New York Giants and on May 1 was briefly the property of the Philadelphia Phillies.

== Births ==
=== January ===
- January 2 – Sonny Ruberto (d. 2014)
- January 3 – Archie Reynolds
- January 7 – Joe Keough (d. 2019)
- January 10:
  - Vern Geishert
  - George Korince
- January 15 – Tom Robson (d. 2021)
- January 18 – Billy Grabarkewitz
- January 21 – Johnny Oates (d. 2004)
- January 29 – Tony Pierce (d. 2013)

=== February ===
- February 5:
  - Vic Correll
  - Norm Miller
- February 8:
  - Oscar Brown (d. 2020)
  - Larry Burchart
- February 10 – Bob Spence
- February 23 – Ken Boswell
- February 28 – Marty Perez

=== March ===
- March 4 – Danny Frisella (d. 1977)
- March 5 – Les Rohr (d. 2020)
- March 14 – Ron Law (d. 1994)
- March 15 – Bobby Bonds (d. 2003)
- March 18 – Van Kelly
- March 21:
  - Rickey Clark
  - Al Fitzmorris (d. 2024)
- March 27:
  - Mike Jackson
  - Bill Sudakis (d. 2021)
- March 31:
  - Bill Denehy (d. 2025)
  - Gonzalo Márquez (d. 1984)

=== April ===
- April 3 – Rod Gaspar
- April 8 – Catfish Hunter (d. 1999)
- April 9 – Nate Colbert (d. 2023)
- April 10:
  - Phil Hennigan (d. 2016)
  - Leroy Stanton (d. 2019)
  - Bob Watson (d. 2020)
- April 16 – Sergio Robles
- April 18 – Gerry Janeski
- April 20:
  - Chuck Machemehl
  - Tom Hutton
- April 29 – Don Buschhorn

=== May ===
- May 10:
  - Miguel Fuentes (d. 1970)
  - Ray Jarvis (d. 2020)
- May 17 – Dan Monzon (d. 1996)
- May 18 – Reggie Jackson
- May 20:
  - Jim Lyttle
  - Bobby Murcer (d. 2008)
- May 22:
  - Jim Colborn
  - Dave Robinson
- May 24 – Ellie Rodriguez (d. 2026)
- May 25 – Mike Corkins (d. 2023)
- May 28 – Skip Jutze
- May 29 – Dyar Miller
- May 30 – Mike Sadek (d. 2021)

=== June ===
- June 2 – Roger Freed (d. 1996)
- June 6 – Gaylen Pitts (d. 2024)
- June 8 – Jack Lind
- June 9 – Tom Egan
- June 11 – Danny Morris (d. 2023)
- June 12 – Jim Strickland
- June 15:
  - Ken Henderson
  - Champ Summers (d. 2012)
- June 16 – Tom Ragland
- June 19 – Ozzie Osborn
- June 28 – Greg Sims

=== July ===
- July 4 – Joe Henderson
- July 7 – Rick Kester
- July 9 – George Stone
- July 13 – Jerry Terrell
- July 15 – Ron Diorio
- July 20 – John Lamb
- July 22 – Bill Zepp
- July 27 – Larry Biittner (d. 2022)
- July 29 – Harvey Shank

=== August ===
- August 4 – Kevin Collins (d. 2016)
- August 9 – Jerry Moses (d. 2018)
- August 11:
  - Mike Hedlund
  - Eddie Leon
- August 15:
  - Joe Lis (d. 2010)
  - Ernie McAnally
- August 17 – Skip Lockwood
- August 18:
  - Derryl Cousins (d. 2020)
  - Jim Magnuson (d. 1991)
- August 22 – Gary Boyd (d. 2025)
- August 25 – Rollie Fingers
- August 27:
  - Ed Herrmann (d. 2013)
  - Ray Peters (d. 2019)
- August 28 – Mike Torrez
- August 29:
  - Bill McNulty
  - John Sipin

=== September ===
- September 1 – Monty Montgomery
- September 4:
  - Sal Artiaga (d. 2019)
  - Ken Wright (d. 2017)
- September 6 – Fran Healy
- September 7:
  - Willie Crawford (d. 2004)
  - Joe Rudi
- September 8:
  - Ken Forsch
  - Jeff Pentland
- September 18 – Dave Sells
- September 19:
  - Joe Ferguson
  - Ron Lolich
- September 20 – Roric Harrison (d. 2023)
- September 22 – Larry Dierker
- September 24:
  - Lou Camilli
  - Kōichi Tabuchi

=== October ===
- October 1 – Jon Warden
- October 2 – Bob Robertson
- October 6:
  - Gene Clines (d. 2022)
  - Gary Gentry
- October 8:
  - Ralph Gagliano
  - Paul Splittorff (d. 2011)
  - Mike Wegener (d. 2023)
- October 9 – Jim Qualls
- October 10 – Gene Tenace
- October 11 – Jarvis Tatum (d. 2003)
- October 13 – John Strohmayer (d. 2019)
- October 14:
  - Frank Duffy
  - Al Oliver
- October 15 – Scott Northey
- October 17 – Rich Folkers
- October 18 – George Greer
- October 19 – Warren Bogle
- October 25:
  - Don Eddy (d. 2018)
  - Koji Yamamoto
- October 27 – Rick Austin
- October 29 – Frank Baker

=== November ===
- November 1:
  - Dick Baney
  - Jim Kennedy
- November 2 – Tom Paciorek
- November 3:
  - Tom Heintzelman
  - Garry Hill (d. 2017)
- November 4 – Danny Godby
- November 5:
  - Jim Bethke (d. 2025)
  - Jim Evans
- November 13 – George Theodore
- November 22:
  - Cy Acosta
  - Rich McKinney
- November 25:
  - Wenty Ford (d. 1980)
  - Don Leshnock (d. 2012)

=== December ===
- December 2 – Pedro Borbón (d. 2012)
- December 3 – Greg Washburn
- December 8 – Alan Foster
- December 9 – Rick Bladt
- December 10 – Bobby Fenwick
- December 15 – Art Howe
- December 17 – Michiyo Arito
- December 25 – Gene Lamont
- December 28 – Spaceman Bill Lee
- December 29 – Ken Rudolph

== Deaths ==
=== January ===
- January 13 – Kid Speer, 59, Canadian pitcher who played for the Detroit Tigers during the 1909 season.
- January 18
  - Reeve McKay, 64, pitcher who played briefly for the 1915 St. Louis Browns of the American League.
  - Dave Wright, 70, pitcher who played with the Pittsburgh Pirates in 1895 and the Chicago Colts in 1897.
- January 23 – William Matthews, 68, pitcher for the 1909 Boston Red Sox.
- January 28 – Pat Flaherty, 79, third baseman who played for the 1894 Louisville Colonels of the National League.
- January 29 – Ed Merrill, 85, second baseman for the Louisville Eclipse, Worcester Ruby Legs and Indianapolis Hoosiers in span of two seasons from 1882 to 1884.

=== February ===
- February 1 – Dad Hale, 65, pitched 11 games for the Boston Beaneaters and Baltimore Orioles in 1902.
- February 6 – Charlie Knepper, 74, pitcher for the 1899 Cleveland Spiders of the National League.
- February 13 – Marc Campbell, 61, shortstop in two games for the 1907 Pittsburgh Pirates.
- February 14 – Woody Wagenhorst, 82, third baseman in two games for the 1888 Philadelphia Quakers of the National League who later became head coach of the University of Pennsylvania football team from 1888 to 1891.
- February 15 – George Starnagle, 72, played one game at catcher for the Cleveland Bronchos in the 1902 season.
- February 21 – Bill Cunningham, 59, second baseman for the Washington Senators from 1910–1912.

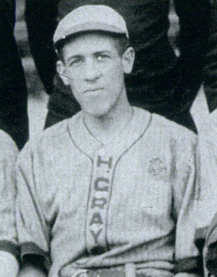
Cumberland Posey

=== March ===
- March 3 – Hick Cady, 60, backup catcher for the Boston Red Sox from 1912 to 1917 and the Philadelphia Phillies in 1919.
- March 6 – Claude Thomas, 55, pitched briefly for the Washington Senators in the 1916 season.
- March 9 – Tom Nagle, 80, catcher for the Chicago Colts of the National League for parts of two seasons from 1890 to 1891.
- March 11 – Ed McDonald, 59, third baseman for parts of three seasons with the Boston Rustlers/Braves and Chicago Cubs from 1911 to 1913.
- March 16 – John Kerin, 71, American League umpire who officiated from 1908 to 1910.
- March 21 – George Wheeler, 76, switch pitcher for the Philadelphia Phillies from 1896 to 1899.
- March 25 – Hack Schumann, 61, pitched briefly for the 1906 Philadelphia Athletics.
- March 28
  - Chick Fullis, 45, center fielder who played from 1928 to 1936 for the New York Giants, Philadelphia Phillies and St. Louis Cardinals, and a member of the 1934 World Series champions.
  - Cumberland Posey, 55, Hall-of-Fame outfielder, manager, executive, and the principal owner of the Homestead Grays, who built a strong barnstorming circuit that made the Grays a perennially powerful and profitable team, one of the best in Negro leagues history.

=== April ===
- April 1 – George Strief, 89, utility man who played all infield and outfield positions for several clubs between 1879 and 1885.
- April 4 – Harry Cross, 64, one of the most accomplished sports journalists in New York City for more than three decades.
- April 5 – Wally Rehg, 57, right fielder for the Boston Red Sox, Boston Braves and Cincinnati Reds between 1912 and 1919, later a minor league player and manager from 1910 to 1930
- April 13 – Billy Gumbert, 80, pitcher who played for the Pittsburgh Alleghenys/Pirates and Louisville Colonels in part of three seasons spanning 1890–1893.
- April 15 – Pete Allen, 77, backup catcher for the Cleveland Spiders in the 1893 season.
- April 17 – John Picus "Jack" Quinn, 62, Slovakia-born pitcher who won 247 games with eight different teams from 1909 to 1933, winning his last game when he was 50 years old; setting a record as the oldest Major League pitcher to win a game until Jamie Moyer broke it on April 17, 2012.
- April 23
  - Joe Birmingham, 61, center fielder and manager for the Cleveland Naps in the early 1900s.
  - Jack Rothfuss, 74, first baseman for the 1897 Pittsburgh Pirates.

=== May ===
- May 6 – Bill Deitrick, 44, outfielder and shortstop for the Philadelphia Phillies in 1927 and 1928.
- May 7
  - Bill Fincher, 51, pitcher for the 1916 St. Louis Browns of the American League.
  - Bill Fox, 74, second baseman for the Washington Senators in 1897 and the Cincinnati Reds in 1901, who also spent 13 seasons in the minor leagues as a player/manager between 1894 and 1915.
- May 10 – Harry Swan, 58, who made one pitching appearance for the Kansas City Packers of the "outlaw" Federal League in 1914.
- May 15 – Ed Mayer, 80, third baseman in 188 games for the Philadelphia Phillies from 1890 to 1891.
- May 17 – Billy Stage, 77, National League umpire in 1894–1895 who later became an attorney and politician in Cleveland, Ohio.
- May 19
  - Jack Stafford, 66 or 67, Canadian umpire who worked one game in the National League (1906) and 131 contests in American League (1907).
  - John K. Tener, 82, Ireland-born pitcher and outfielder who played from 1888 through 1890 for the Baltimore Orioles, Chicago White Stockings and Pittsburgh Burghers before becoming president of the National League from 1913 to 1918.
- May 22 – Harry Betts, 64, who pitched one game in 1903 with the St. Louis Cardinals, and then came back to the majors ten years later in 1913 to pitch one more game for the Cincinnati Reds in 1913.
- May 23 – Johnny Grabowski, 46, catcher who played for three teams in a span of seven seasons from 1924 to 1931, and a member of the Murderers' Row New York Yankees clubs that clinched the World Series in 1927 and 1928.
- May 30 – Billy Earle, 78, catcher for five major league teams in five seasons from 1889 to 1894, who continued playing and managing in the minors until 1906, and also managed the Almendares BBC in 1901 to become the first American manager in Cuban Winter League history.

=== June ===
- June 2 – Malcolm MacDonald, 74, outfielder for the New York Giants in 1902.
- June 4 – Tom Barry, 67, pitcher for the 1904 Philadelphia Phillies.
- June 17 – James Isaminger, 65, sportswriter for Philadelphia newspapers from 1905 to 1940, who played a major role in breaking the story of the Black Sox Scandal.
- June 26 – Chris Hartje, 31, catcher who played with the Brooklyn Dodgers in the 1939 season; Hartje was one of nine members of the Spokane Indians of the Class B Western International League who died as the result of a June 24, 1946, bus crash on the Snoqualmie Pass Highway in the Cascade Mountains, the worst transit accident in baseball history.
- June 30 – Sam Hope, 67, pitcher for the 1907 Philadelphia Athletics.

=== July ===
- July 1 – Hub Knolls, 62, pitched two games for the 1906 Brooklyn Superbas.
- July 17
  - John Fluhrer, 52, played briefly in left field for the Chicago Cubs during the 1915 season.
  - Tom Forster, 87, second baseman for the 1882 Detroit Wolverines and from 1884–1886 for the Pittsburgh Alleghenys and New York Metropolitans of the American Association.
- July 18 – James Lehan, 90, played briefly in the outfield for the 1884 Washington Nationals of the Union Association.
- July 22 – Elmer Foster, 84, outfielder for all or parts of five seasons for the New York Metropolitans of the American Association, and the New York Giants and Chicago Cubs of the National League between 1886 and 1891, including the 1888 Giants National League Championship team.

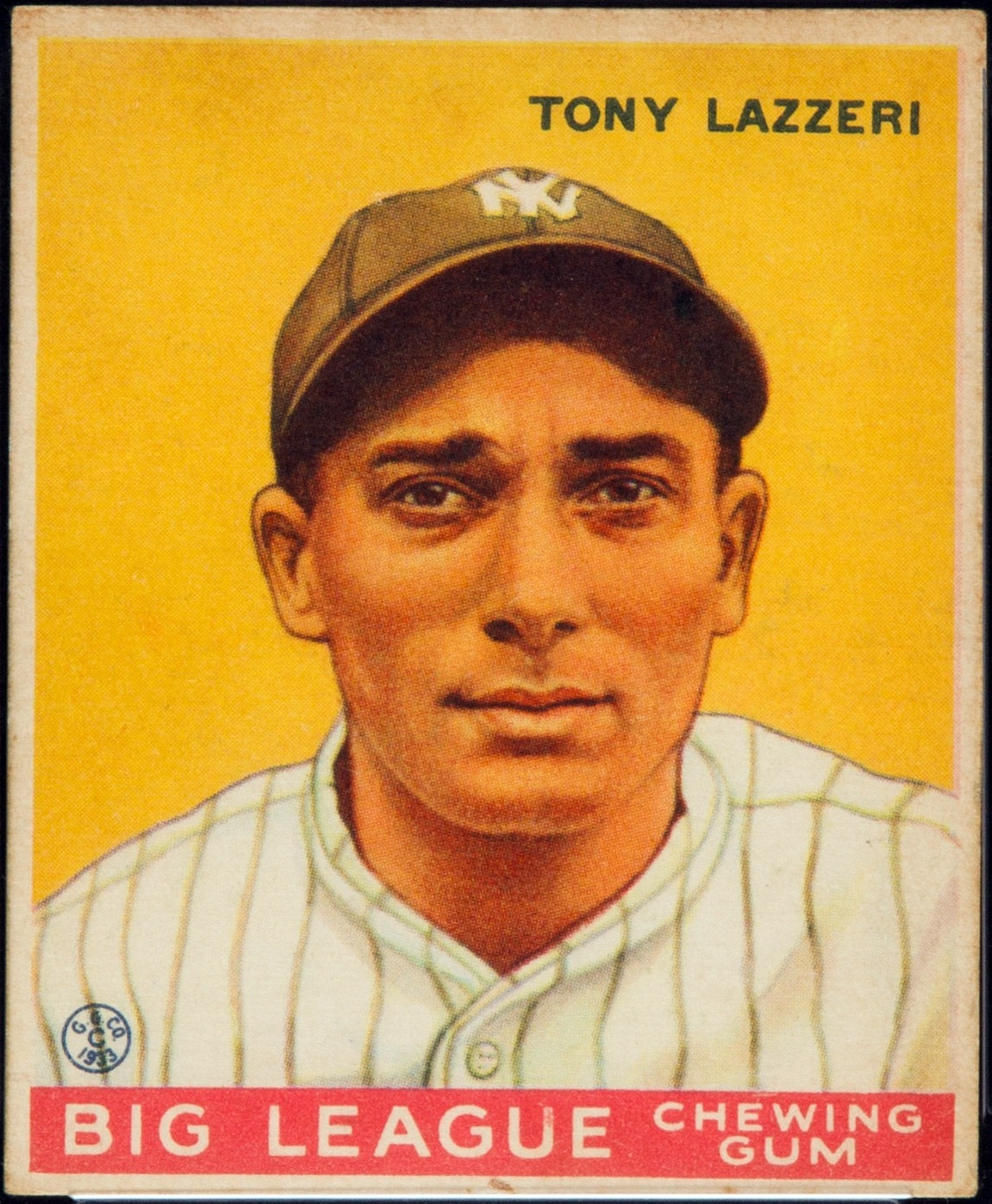
Tony Lazzeri

=== August ===
- August 1 – Bert Sincock, 58, pitched one game for the 1908 Cincinnati Reds.
- August 2 – Carl Lind, 42, second baseman from 1927 to 1930 for the Cleveland Indians who led the American League in at-bats in 1928 (659).
- August 6 – Tony Lazzeri, 42, Hall-of-Fame and All-Star second baseman for the 1926–1937 New York Yankees, who won six AL pennants and five World Series; batted .300 five times and collected seven 100-RBI seasons; hit two grand slams and drove in 11 RBI in a single game on May 24, 1936; posted a .400 average in the 1937 World Series.
- August 7 – Tad Quinn, 64, played parts of two seasons on the mound for the Philadelphia Athletics from 1902 to 1903.
- August 16 – Billy Rhiel, 46, infielder for the Brooklyn Robins, Boston Braves, and Detroit Tigers from 1929 to 1933.
- August 19 – Bob McKinney, 70, played briefly in the infield for the 1901 Philadelphia Athletics.

=== September ===
- September 11 – Cy Morgan, 50, pitcher for parts of two seasons for the Boston Braves in 1921–1922.
- September 13 – Ed Gagnier, 64, French shortstop who played in the Federal League for the Brooklyn Tip-Tops and Buffalo Blues from 1914 to 1915.
- September 15 – Tex Wilson, 45, pitched two games for the 1924 Brooklyn Robins.
- September 16 – Emil Bildilli, 34, southpaw pitcher for five seasons for the St. Louis Browns from 1937 to 1941.
- September 17
  - Frank Burke, 66, played parts of two seasons at outfielder for the 1906 New York Giants and the 1907 Boston Doves of the National League.
  - Chief Chouneau, 57, Chippewa pitcher who played in one game for the Chicago White Sox in 1910.
- September 20 – Wiley Piatt, 72, pitcher for six seasons from 1898 to 1903 for the Philadelphia Phillies, Philadelphia Athletics, Chicago White Sox, and Boston Beaneaters, who holds the dubious distinction of being the only pitcher in the 20th century to hurl two complete games in a single day and lose them both.
- September 24 – Jeff Tesreau, 58, spitball ace for the New York Giants from 1912 to 1918 who won three pennants with them (1912, 1913, and 1917), and led the National League in ERA in 1912 and shutouts in 1914, ending his career with a 115–72 record, 2.43 ERA, and 880 strikeouts.
- September 27
  - Benjamin Minor, 81, co-owner or owner of the Washington Senators from 1904 to 1919.
  - Eddie Tiemeyer, 61, infielder/pitcher during three seasons with the Cincinnati Reds and New York Highlanders spanning 1906 to 1909.

=== October ===
- October 4 – John Woods, 48, pitched one game for the 1924 Boston Red Sox.
- October 10
  - Walter Clarkson, 67, pitcher in five seasons with the New York Highlanders and Cleveland Naps from 1904 to 1908.
  - Bill Jones, 59, outfielder who played two seasons with the Boston Rustlers/Braves in 1911–1912.
- October 18 – Jack McCallister, 67, minor league player who became a major league manager and coach; piloted 1927 Cleveland Indians to a 66–87 record, good for sixth in the American League.

=== November ===
- November 3 – Ben Taylor, 57, pitcher for the 1912 Cincinnati Reds.
- November 4 – John Barthold, 64, pitcher who played for the Philadelphia Athletics during the 1904 season.
- November 5 – Alejandro Oms, 51, Cuban center fielder who played in the Negro leagues.
- November 7 – Tom Daly, 54, Canadian catcher for the Chicago White Sox, Cleveland Indians and Chicago Cubs during eight seasons spanning 1913–1921, who later managed the Toronto Maple Leafs of the International League, and coached for the Boston Red Sox in 14 seasons (1933–1946), to set the longest consecutive-year coaching tenure in Bosox history.
- November 11 – Art Reinhart, 47, pitcher who played for the St. Louis Cardinals in a span of five seasons from 1919 to 1928.
- November 18 – Johnny Lush, 61, pitcher for the Philadelphia Phillies and St. Louis Cardinals from 1904 through 1910, who no-hit the Brooklyn Superbas in 1906, which was the last no-hitter by a Phillies pitcher in 57 years until Jim Bunning hurled a perfect game in 1964.
- November 27 – Arlie Tarbert, 42, reserve outfielder for the 1927–1928 Boston Red Sox.
- November 28 – Bill DeLancey, 35, catcher for the Gashouse Gang 1934 St. Louis Cardinals, whose promising career was cut short by tuberculosis.
- November 30 – Pete McShannic, 82, third baseman for the Pittsburgh Alleghenys of the National League in the 1888 season.

Walter Johnson

=== December ===
- December 10
  - Walter Johnson, 59, Hall-of-Fame pitcher who played from 1907 through 1927 for the Washington Senators, whose 417 career victories ranks second to the 511 achieved by Cy Young, while setting an all-time record with 110 shutouts, and collecting 3,509 strikeouts, twelve 20-win seasons, including two 30-win seasons, as well as 11 seasons with an earned run average below 2.00, 5,914 innings pitched, and 531 complete games in 666 starts; managed Washington (1929–1932) and the Cleveland Indians (1933–1935) to a 529–432 record.
  - Walter Moser, 65, pitcher for the Philadelphia Athletics, Boston Red Sox and St. Louis Browns in a span of three seasons from 1906 to 1911.
  - Damon Runyon, 66, famed New York sportswriter and author.
- December 14 – Tom Dowse, 80, Irish catcher/outfielder who played in the 1890s for the Cleveland Spiders/Solons, Louisville Colonels, Cincinnati Reds, Philadelphia Phillies and Washington Senators.
- December 16 – Walter Ball, 68, pitcher in Black baseball who appeared for the 1920–1921 Chicago Giants of the Negro National League; also played on integrated amateur teams in Minnesota and the Dakotas during the turn of the century.
- December 21 – Bill Evans, 53, pitcher for the Pittsburgh Pirates in three seasons from 1916 to 1919.
- December 30 – Pat McGehee, 58, pitcher who played for the 1912 Detroit Tigers.
