= Florence Dreyfuss =

American baseball executive and owner

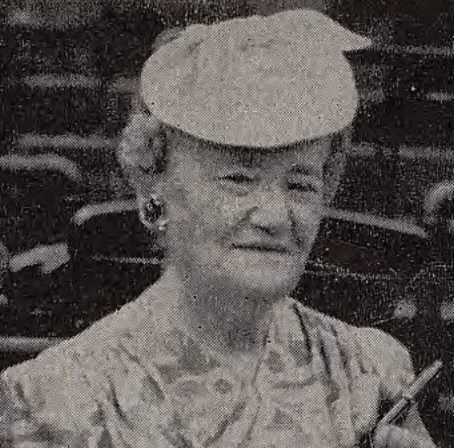
- Dreyfuss in 1944
- Born: Florence Edith Wolf; March 31, 1872; Louisville, Kentucky, US
- Died: May 12, 1950 (aged 78); Pittsburgh, Pennsylvania, US
- Occupation: Baseball owner
- Spouse: Barney Dreyfuss (m. 1895)
- Children: 2
- Relatives: William Benswanger (son-in-law)
- Baseball career

Teams
- As Owner: Pittsburgh Pirates (1932–1946)

Florence Edith Wolf Dreyfuss (March 31, 1872 – May 12, 1950) was an American executive in Major League Baseball who owned the Pittsburgh Pirates franchise from 1932 to 1946.

== Personal life ==
Florence Edith Wolf, a native of Louisville, Kentucky, met Barney Dreyfuss on a train to Cincinnati in 1892. They married in 1895. The couple had two children: Samuel and Eleanor Dreyfuss. In the late 19th century, Barney bought into the Louisville Colonels baseball team, eventually moving into ownership of Pittsburgh. It was intended for Samuel to inherit the Pirates upon his death. However, Samuel died in 1931, a year before his father. Florence, now majority owner of the Pirates, urged her son-in-law, William Benswanger, to take over as president and operating head of the franchise. Benswanger ran the team until it was sold in 1946, ending the Dreyfuss-Benswanger family's half-century in baseball. During her tenure as majority owner, the Pirates did not win a pennant, twice finishing second in the National League.

== Death ==
Dreyfuss died on May 12, 1950.

== See also ==
- Women in baseball
- List of female Major League Baseball principal owners
