= William Benswanger =

- Born: February 22, 1892; New York City, U.S.
- Died: January 15, 1972 (aged 79); Pittsburgh, Pennsylvania, U.S.
- Occupation: Baseball executive
- Spouse: Eleanor "Fanny" Dreyfuss (m. 1925)
- Children: 1
- Relatives: Barney Dreyfuss (father-in-law)

William Edward Benswanger (February 22, 1892 – January 15, 1972) was an American businessman who served for almost 15 years as president and chief executive of the Pittsburgh Pirates Major League Baseball franchise, from 1932 through 1946.

Born in New York City, Benswanger moved with his family to Pittsburgh when he was five years of age. Upon adulthood, he entered his family's insurance business, then served in the United States Army's balloon corps during World War I. He also was an accomplished pianist and musician and served on the board of the Pittsburgh Symphony Orchestra for two decades.

== Son-in-law of Pirates' owners ==
Benswanger became involved in baseball through his marriage to Eleanor "Fanny" Dreyfuss, daughter of longtime Pirates owner Barney Dreyfuss. The elder Dreyfuss was grooming his son, Samuel, to succeed him as club president, but Samuel Dreyfuss died suddenly in 1931 from pneumonia at age 35. The following year, Barney Dreyfuss died as well. Dreyfuss' widow, Florence, inherited the team. She successfully prevailed upon Benswanger, her son-in-law, to become president and operating head of the franchise.

He would lead the team from 1932 through the 1946 season. During that time, the Pirates boasted a number of star players, including Baseball Hall of Fame members Paul Waner, Lloyd Waner, Pie Traynor, Arky Vaughan and Ralph Kiner. But, apart from four second-place finishes, they resided in the middle- to lower-rung of the National League and were late in developing a farm system, the surest method at the time of attaining sustained success in baseball. On the plus side, Benswanger kept the team going through the Great Depression and brought back all-time great Honus Wagner to serve as a coach.

== Fought players' union in 1946 ==
Benswanger's last year as president, 1946, was especially tumultuous.

Robert Murphy, a Boston labor lawyer, organized the American Baseball Guild, a players' union and predecessor of the Major League Baseball Players Association. Early demands included a minimum salary, standardization of player contracts, and an increase in per-diem expense reimbursements (amending or abolishing the reserve clause was not yet on the table). Murphy targeted the Pirates as the testing ground for signing members of the Guild because of Pittsburgh's reputation as a union stronghold. The majority of the Pirates joined the Guild, with the notable exception of veteran pitcher Rip Sewell. Benswanger, as point man for the Major League owners, would not negotiate with the Guild, and Murphy threatened a strike for the Pirates' June 7 game with the New York Giants. In a pre-game players-only meeting, a majority voted in favor of striking. However, due to Sewell's forceful opposition, the vote fell short of the required two-thirds majority, and the threat evaporated. The failure of the strike vote fatally wounded the Guild; the owners made minor concessions to players, and staved off the effective creation of a union until the MLBPA was formed in 1966.

At the same time Benswanger was fending off the American Baseball Guild, the Dreyfuss family's 46-year ownership of the team was coming to a close. In August 1946, the Pirates were purchased by an ownership group headed by Indianapolis businessman Frank E. McKinney, and which included entertainer Bing Crosby, Pittsburgh attorney Thomas P. Johnson, and Columbus, Ohio-based real estate magnate John W. Galbreath. Benswanger stepped down as club president upon completion of the sale on August 8. He died in Pittsburgh at the age of 79.

Prior to Branch Rickey's efforts with the Brooklyn Dodgers, Benswanger was one of the few owners and executives who vocally challenged Major League Baseball's color barrier and its major proponent, Commissioner of Baseball Kenesaw Mountain Landis.
