= Barney Dreyfuss =

German-born American baseball executive and owner (1865–1932)

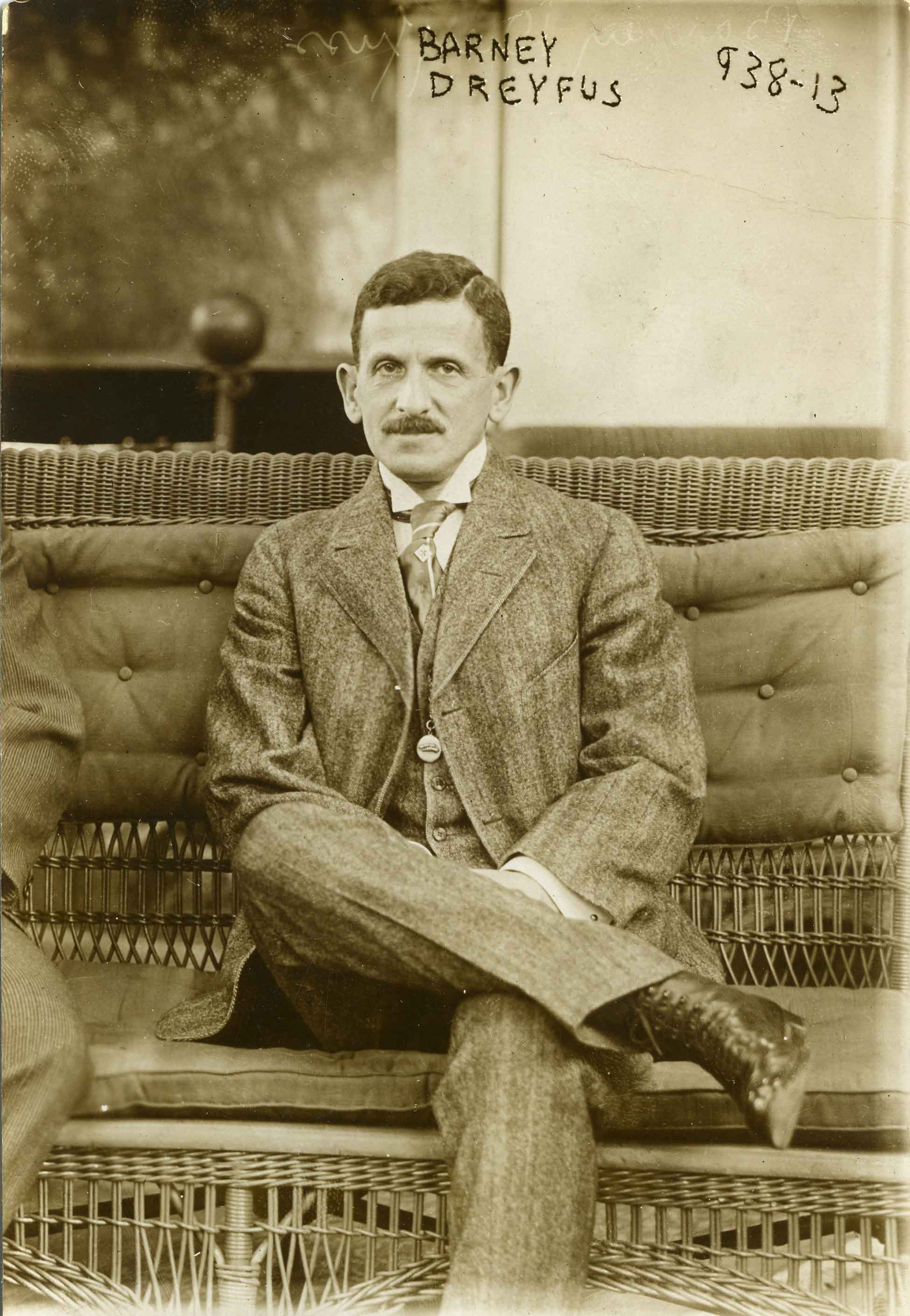
- Dreyfuss, c. 1909
- Born: February 23, 1865; Freiburg, Grand Duchy of Baden
- Died: February 5, 1932 (aged 66); New York City, New York, U.S.
- Occupations: Baseball executive; Distillery owner
- Spouse: Florence Wolf (m. 1895)
- Children: 2
- Relatives: William Benswanger (son-in-law)
- Baseball career

Teams
- As Owner: Louisville Colonels (1890–1899); Pittsburgh Pirates (1900–1932)

Career highlights and awards
- 2x World Series champion (1909, 1925); 6x NL champion (1901, 1902, 1903, 1909, 1925, 1927); AA champion (1890); Founder of the World Series (1903); Oversaw the completion of Forbes Field (1909)

Member of the National

Baseball Hall of Fame
- Induction: 2008
- Vote: 83.3%
- Election method: Veterans Committee

Bernhard "Barney" Dreyfuss (February 23, 1865 – February 5, 1932) was an executive in Major League Baseball who owned the Pittsburgh Pirates franchise from 1900 to his death in 1932. He was inducted into the National Baseball Hall of Fame in 2008.

Dreyfuss is often credited with the creation of the modern baseball World Series. He also built one of baseball's first modern steel and concrete baseball parks, Forbes Field, in 1909. During his period of ownership, the Pirates won six National League pennants, plus World Series titles in 1909 and 1925; only the New York Giants won more NL championships (10) during the same period.

== Early years ==
Dreyfuss was born in Freiburg, Grand Duchy of Baden in 1865. He attended school in Freiburg and later worked in a bank in nearby Karlsruhe. At the age of 16, he emigrated, in 1881, to the US to escape conscription into the German Army. At the time, his prospects of being drafted into the military were high but, as a young Jew, his potential for advancement there was low. Dreyfuss's father, Samuel Dreyfuss (1832–1896), became an American citizen in 1861, but returned to Germany at the outbreak of the Civil War. Samuel Dreyfuss allegedly made a fortune selling spirits to Native Americans.

In America Barney Dreyfuss lived and worked with the Bernheim family in Paducah, Kentucky. The Bernheims were relatives of his father's sister, Friedericke who married Leon Bernheim, the father of Isaac Wolf Bernheim. In 1888, he moved with the Bernheim family to Louisville, Kentucky. Dreyfuss arrived knowing little English, but he was a quick learner (though to the day he died, his English had a marked German accent). In a few years, he rose from being a clerk to an officer of Bernheim Brothers, the creator of I. W. Harper bourbon.

== Louisville Colonels ==
Dreyfuss enjoyed the game of baseball. He fueled his interest by organizing amateur baseball teams first for the distillery workers, then for semi-pro clubs around Louisville. In 1889 the distillery moved to larger quarters in Louisville. Dreyfuss used growing profits to buy a piece of the Louisville Colonels of baseball's American Association. The team won the league pennant in 1890, and played to a 3-3-1 draw in the pre-modern World Series against the Brooklyn Bridegrooms, which became today's Los Angeles Dodgers. The American Association fell apart in 1891, prompting Dreyfuss to move the Colonels into the National League.

One of his best decisions was hiring a local city editor and educated lawyer, Harry Clay Pulliam, to serve as his club secretary; he later appointed Pulliam president. When Dreyfuss immigrated to America, it was Pulliam who taught him how to speak English (though to the day he died, he spoke with a marked German accent). However Pulliam's greatest contribution to the Colonels occurred when he convinced Dreyfuss to sign future Hall of Famer Honus Wagner to the team.

For much of the 1890s, the Colonels were in last place in the National League. In 1899, Dreyfuss paid $50,000 to acquire full ownership of the Colonels. By this time, however, the National League contracted several teams after the 1899 season and Dreyfuss purchased a half-interest in the Pittsburgh Pirates. As part of the deal, he negotiated the transfer of the best Louisville players, namely Wagner, Fred Clarke, Tommy Leach, Deacon Phillippe, and Rube Waddell to Pittsburgh. To pull off this deal, Dreyfuss accepted an option to purchase an interest in the Pirates, then traded the best of the Colonel's players to the Pirates; he then used this leverage to buy out his partners. The Colonels' president, Harry Pulliam, also left for the Pirates with Dreyfuss and became the team's president.

== Pittsburgh Pirates ==
In Pittsburgh, Honus Wagner emerged as the National League's biggest star. The Pirates then won NL pennants in 1901, 1902, and 1903.

=== World Series ===
However, a bidding war was taking place between the National League and the upstart American League. Dreyfuss was victorious in an attempt to keep the new league out of Pittsburgh. However, he knew that the bidding war needed to end for the leagues to be prosperous. In 1903, Dreyfuss brokered the peace treaty that recognized two major leagues. It also instituted a single set of rules, established agreements with the minor leagues, set up cooperative scheduling, and recognized each league's rights to its own players. To cash in on the peace between the leagues, an agreement with terms was created by Dreyfuss and Boston Americans' (today's Boston Red Sox) owner Henry Killilea to create the modern World Series. Although his Pirates would lose to the Boston Americans 5 games to 3, the games proved to be a success. Dreyfuss further cemented his reputation by adding his own share of the gate receipts to the players' winnings.

=== Forbes Field ===
At the end of the 1908 season, Dreyfuss decided it was time that Pittsburgh had a new, larger stadium for its growing fan base and winning team. The team's current field, Exposition Park, was made of wood and so close to the banks of the Allegheny River that the outfield regularly flooded after heavy rains. Meanwhile, across the state in Philadelphia, Philadelphia Athletics owners Ben Shibe and Connie Mack had decided to build a steel and concrete venue for their team. Dreyfuss, with no intention of being one-upped, began the construction of Forbes Field.

The new stadium was built in the city's Oakland district and was named after John Forbes, the French and Indian War general who captured Fort Duquesne in 1758 and renamed it Fort Pitt. Dreyfuss purchased seven acres of land near the Carnegie Library of Pittsburgh, adjacent to Schenley Park, with assistance from his friend, industrialist Andrew Carnegie. The low-priced land was selected so Dreyfuss could spend more on the stadium itself. Dreyfuss signed a contract that he would "make the ballpark ... of a design that would harmonize with the other structures in the Schenley Park district." The site was initially labeled "Dreyfuss's Folly" due to its long distance—a 10-minute trolley ride—from downtown Pittsburgh; however, the land around the park developed and criticisms were dropped. Official Pirates' records show that Forbes Field cost $1 million for site acquisition and construction, but some estimates place the cost at twice that amount.

The new park opened on June 30, 1909, and Dreyfuss shook hands with the fans as they entered through the gates. The crowd for the stadium's inaugural game included Pittsburgh Mayor William A. Magee, Harry Pulliam (now the National League President), and Congressman John K. Tener, a former Major League player who was soon to become the Governor of Pennsylvania. While Pirates did lose their first game at Forbes to the Chicago Cubs, they did go on to win the 1909 World Series later that year, over the Detroit Tigers.

=== 1910–1932 ===
In 1912, Dreyfuss became one of the major stockholders of Welte & Sons Inc. However, he was still involved in every decision made involving the Pirates. Under his leadership, the Pirates won two more National League pennants and the 1925 World Series over the Washington Senators. He successfully helped fight off the Federal League in 1914 and 1915, and then helped form the commission that investigated the 1919 Black Sox Scandal. He also worked to abolish the three-man commission that ran the National League in favor of appointing a baseball commissioner, a post to be occupied by Judge Kenesaw Mountain Landis. He also worked to outlaw "freak" pitches such as the spitball, and he was a force in ridding the game of gambling.

== Pittsburgh Stars ==
In 1902, Dreyfuss and Pittsburgh Pirates minority owner William Chase Temple were suspected of being the secret owners to the Pittsburgh Stars, a professional American football team in the first National Football League. Both men denied any connection to the Stars' finances, as well as being the team's true owners. While the team's owner on paper, David Berry, insisted that he was the team's sole owner, it was impossible for him to afford the money to finance the team without the backing of Temple or Dreyfuss. The Stars would go on to win the 1902 NFL championship.

== Death ==
Dreyfuss died on February 5, 1932, at age 66 in New York City. He was buried in West View Cemetery in Pittsburgh, Pennsylvania. At the time of his death, he was vice president of the National League. Landis, the presidents of both the National and American Leagues, club executives from competing teams, and players such as Honus Wagner and Deacon Phillippe, served as honorary pallbearers at his funeral.

== Legacy ==
On June 30, 1934, the 25th anniversary of the opening of Forbes Field, a small stone monument to Dreyfuss was installed in straightaway center field at Forbes. When the Pirates moved to Three Rivers Stadium in 1970, the monument was brought along and displayed in the stadium concourse. The monument has since been moved to the Pirates' current field, PNC Park, located on the concourse behind home plate.

Dreyfuss met Florence Edith Wolf, a native of Louisville, Kentucky on a train to Cincinnati in 1892. They married in 1895. The couple had two children: Samuel and Eleanor Dreyfuss. Dreyfuss had groomed his son, Samuel, to inherit the Pirates upon his death. However, Samuel died in 1931, a year before his father. Florence, now majority owner of the Pirates, urged her son-in-law, William Benswanger, to take over as president and operating head of the franchise. Benswanger ran the team until it was sold in 1946, ending the Dreyfuss-Benswanger family's half-century in baseball.

Dreyfuss was named to the Honor Rolls of Baseball in 1946 and inducted into the National Baseball Hall of Fame in 2008 following his election by the Veterans Committee.
