= American Baseball Guild =

Former trade union of the United States

- Founded: April 14, 1946
- Dissolved: 1946
- Location: United States
- Key people: Robert F. Murphy; F. X. Doherty

The American Baseball Guild was an American trade union that attempted to organize Major League Baseball (MLB) players into a collective bargaining unit in 1946. Created by Robert Francis Murphy, a Harvard-educated labor lawyer from Boston, it failed to take root when Murphy could not convince a two-thirds majority of the Pittsburgh Pirates' active players to authorize a strike before a National League game on June 7, 1946. That summer, MLB owners — also shaken by the Mexican League raids that enticed a handful of American players to "jump" their contracts for higher salaries in Mexico — made minor concessions to players and the Guild perished. It was the fourth and last unsuccessful attempt to unionize big-league players before the formation of the Major League Baseball Players Association, founded in 1953 and recognized as their official bargaining unit in 1966.

== Background ==
The post-World War II era was a tumultuous period for baseball. In 1946, the first full season after the war ended in August 1945, many players who had been serving in the military resumed, or tried to resume, their pre-war baseball careers. The resulting surplus of talent necessitated a temporary expansion of teams' playing rosters: instead of the normal 25-man quota, teams were permitted to carry 36 players before June 15, and 30 thereafter. Attendance would nearly double 1945's wartime totals, reversing a period of declining turnstile counts that had begun with the advent of The Great Depression in 1930 and kicking off a four-year "baseball boom" in both the majors and in minor league baseball.

But player salaries remained stagnant. The sudden surplus of players and the expanded rosters simultaneously depressed individual salaries and inflated the payrolls of the 16 clubs. In addition, the impact and duration of the attendance spike could not be foreseen, and several MLB teams (such as the Chicago White Sox, Philadelphia Athletics and Washington Senators) were still owned by budget-constrained former players or their families who had no income sources outside their turnstile receipts. Furthermore, the reserve clause in the standard player contract perpetually bound signees to their respective teams. Capitalizing on this situation, the Mexican League, operating outside the "Organized Baseball" sphere and dominated by Jorge Pasquel, its president and most powerful club owner, convinced 18 MLB players to abandon their teams to play in Mexico for higher wages. Some of the exiles, such as Brooklyn Dodgers catcher Mickey Owen and undefeated St. Louis Cardinals starting pitcher Max Lanier, were considered top-flight players; moreover, Pasquel set his sights on future Baseball Hall of Famers Joe DiMaggio, Bob Feller, Stan Musial and Ted Williams, and MLB stars like hard-hitting St. Louis Browns shortstop Vern Stephens. Meanwhile, Owen, Lanier and the other "contract jumpers" were suspended by Commissioner of Baseball Happy Chandler.

Outside baseball, labor disputes broke out in multiple industries, resulting in a wave of strikes. Prominent among these job actions were walkouts by steel and coal workers in Pittsburgh early in 1946.

== Formation of the Guild ==
This confluence of events led Murphy, a former examiner for the National Labor Relations Board, to form the American Baseball Guild on April 14, 1946, saying: "I could talk for three days on some of the injustices done to ballplayers by the club owners." The Guild announced six stated goals:

- Players whose contracts are sold from team to team should receive 50 percent of the purchase price
- Players may take salary disputes and other grievances to arbitration
- Owners may not institute a maximum salary
- A minimum salary of $7,500 per year should be established
- Contracts may not be “one-sided”
- Provisions should be made for bonuses and insurance.

The reference to "one-sided" contracts was an early shot across the reserve clause's bow; however, Murphy declined to make a frontal assault on the provision because he feared "over-reaching." Wrote The Harvard Crimson in August 1946: "[Murphy] doesn't believe that the much discussed reserve clause can be completely done away with without benefiting the more affluent clubs. Murphy does not feel, however, that the contract, in its present form, would stand up in a court of law, since it is completely one-sided, binding a player to one team for life, while the club must give him only ten days notice before releasing him."

== Failed strike vote ==
Early in 1946, Murphy began to approach players from some of the 16 major league teams about joining the Guild. He focused on the Pittsburgh Pirates, who played in a union stronghold, as his initial organizing target. His early efforts seemed to point towards success when, according to The Sporting News 1947 Baseball Guide & Record Book, 95 percent of the Pirates' playing roster took out Guild cards. However, after an initial meeting, Murphy attempted unsuccessfully to bargain with Pirates' president William Benswanger, who was in the process of selling the family-owned team. Benswanger pled with his players to put off bargaining with ownership until the end of the 1946 season. In response, Murphy called for a strike vote on Friday, June 7, when the Pirates were scheduled to play a night game at Forbes Field against the New York Giants. The Guild needed a two-thirds supermajority (24 of the 36 Pittsburgh players voting yes) to authorize the strike.

But in a lengthy players-only meeting before the Giants' game, support for the Guild collapsed in the face of the forceful opposition of pitcher Rip Sewell and infielder Jimmy Brown. The strike authorization received 20 yes votes, still a majority, but short by four men of the required 67 percent mandate and indicative of a fatal erosion of the union's early-season strength. The Pirates ignored Murphy as they exited their clubhouse and took the field, where they handily defeated their opponents, 10–5. Said third baseman Lee Handley: "We played a dirty trick on Murphy. We let him down, and I was one of those who did it." Fans in the stands, many of them trade union members, booed the home side for repudiating the Guild. On leaving Forbes Field that night, Brown was roughed up by pro-union fans in retaliation.

== Aftermath ==
The defeat of the strike vote in Pittsburgh dealt the Guild a death blow. Two months later, major league owners offered concessions to players: a minimum salary of $5,500, the beginnings of a pension plan, the ability for one elected player representative from each league to appear before them to discuss issues and grievances, and a spring training per diem the players nicknamed "Murphy Money." Murphy decried the formation of what he called a "company union", but by the end of the year, the Guild would pass out of existence and Murphy would pass out of public life, saying that the players, having gratefully taken an "apple" from MLB owners, "could have had an orchard." Murphy was able to appeal the June 7 matter before the Pennsylvania Labor Relations Board, but when the Pirates were polled again on August 20, they voted 15–3 against the Guild, with one ballot invalidated and 12 abstentions.

The owners and MLB hierarchy ultimately rewarded the two players who led the fight against the Guild. Sewell, still an effective pitcher and a National League All-Star in 1946, received a gold watch from the Commissioner, and was employed by the Pirates as a minor-league manager after he retired from the field in 1949. Brown, in his final year as a big-league player in 1946, managed high-level farm teams in the Pirates' organization in 1947 and 1948, spent three years on the Boston Braves' coaching staff (1949–1951), and then returned to the minors to spend 13 more years as a manager for multiple organizations from 1952 through 1964.

Following the formation of the MLBPA and its 1966 recognition as the players' collective bargaining representative, the first successful players' strike occurred during spring training in 1969. A second strike shortened the 1972 regular season. The reserve clause, famously challenged by former Cardinals' outfielder Curt Flood in 1970, would survive the Guild by almost three decades until a December 1975 arbitrator's ruling dismantled it and ushered in the era of free agency in Major League Baseball. Since then, MLB experienced lengthy players' strikes in 1981 and 1994–1995, and owner lockouts in 1973, 1976, 1990 and 2022.

== See also ==
- The Brotherhood of Professional Base-Ball Players
- Major League Baseball Players Association
- Flood v. Kuhn
- Seitz decision
