= Red Jones (umpire) =

American baseball umpire (1905-1987)

- Born: Nicholas Ittner Jones; April 16, 1905; Charlotte, North Carolina, U.S.
- Died: March 19, 1987 (aged 81); Miami, Florida, U.S.
- Occupation: Umpire
- Years active: 1944–1949
- Employer: American League

Nicholas Ittner "Red" Jones (April 16, 1905 – March 19, 1987) was an American baseball umpire in the American League between 1944 and 1949. Jones worked in 889 major league games during that stretch.

== Umpiring career ==
From 1936 to 1943, Jones was a minor league umpire with the South Atlantic League, Piedmont League and Southern Association. In 1942, Jones had an opportunity to get a pay raise by moving the American Association, but he turned it down, saying that he liked it when fans heckled him with a southern accent. He made his major league debut as third base umpire in a twelve-inning game between Philadelphia and Washington on April 18, 1944.

In a 1946 game at Fenway Park, Jones was behind the plate when he received heckling from the Chicago White Sox bench. Jones was called a "meathead" and someone made "whoopee-cushion noises". Unable to pinpoint the culprits, Jones ejected fourteen from the Chicago bench. For many years, legend had it that the razzing came from a ventriloquist in the stands, but at least one player has identified Chicago coach Mule Haas as the source.

Jones umpired his last MLB game in 1949. Umpire Bill McKinley described him as a good umpire but one who was easily distracted by comments from players and fans. "He heard everything," McKinley said. "It took his concentration off the game. It bothered him so much that they finally had to fire him after six years."

== Later life ==
In 1950, Jones left umpiring and took a post in sales with the Pfeiffer Brewing Company in Detroit. He later worked in public relations for the Associated Brewing Company and briefly as a television commentator for the Cleveland Indians. Jones also co-hosted a sports interview show with Al Ackerman of WWJ-TV (NBC affiliate) in Detroit.

== Death ==
Jones died on March 19, 1987, in Miami, Florida.
