= Eephus pitch =

Very low-speed baseball pitch

This image depicts the path of an eephus pitch thrown by pitcher Rip Sewell in the 1946 MLB All-Star Game, which was hit for a home run by Ted Williams.

An eephus pitch (also spelled ephus) in baseball is a very high-arcing off-speed pitch. The delivery from the pitcher has very low velocity and often catches the hitter off-guard. The eephus pitch is thrown overhand like most pitches, but is characterized by an unusual, high-arcing trajectory. The corresponding slow velocity bears more resemblance to a slow-pitch softball delivery than to a traditional baseball pitch. It is considered a trick pitch because, in comparison to normal baseball pitches, which run from 70 to 100 miles per hour (110 to 160 km/h), an eephus pitch appears to move in slow motion at 55 mph (89 km/h) or less, sometimes as low as 35 mph (56 km/h).

Its invention is attributed to Rip Sewell of the Pittsburgh Pirates in the 1940s, although according to historians John Thorn and John Holway, the first pitcher to throw a big blooper pitch was Bill Phillips, who played in the National League on and off from 1890 through 1903. The practice then lay dormant for nearly 40 years until Sewell resurrected it. According to manager Frankie Frisch, the pitch was named by outfielder Maurice Van Robays. When asked what it meant, Van Robays replied, "'Eephus ain't nothing, and that's a nothing pitch." Although the origin is not known for certain, "eephus" may come from the Hebrew word אפס (pronounced EF-ess), meaning "zero".

== Development and use in Major League Baseball ==
Sewell's earliest recorded use of the pitch came in a game against the Boston Braves at Forbes Field in Pittsburgh on June 1, 1943, although as early as the spring training season of 1942 Sewell may have been experimenting with the pitch. Sewell went on to win 20 games with the pitch in 1943.

After appearing in over 300 major-league games, Rip Sewell gave up only one career home run off the eephus, to Ted Williams in the 1946 MLB All-Star Game. Williams challenged Sewell to throw the eephus. Sewell obliged, and Williams fouled off the pitch. However, Sewell then announced that he was going to throw the pitch again, and Williams clobbered it for a home run. When describing the mechanics of the pitch and why he was able to succeed where others had failed, Williams remarked "A little girl could hit that pitch, but you had to provide all the power yourself." Years later, however, Williams admitted that he had been running towards the pitcher's mound as he hit the ball, and photographs reveal that he was in fact a few feet in front of the batter's box when he made contact. Since under Rule 6.06(a) of the Official Baseball Rules, a batter is out for illegal action when he hits a ball with one or both feet on the ground entirely outside the batter's box, Williams could have been ruled out had it been spotted by the home plate umpire.

Bill "Spaceman" Lee often threw a version of the eephus pitch, referred to as the "Leephus", "spaceball" or "moon ball". Lee was largely successful with the pitch; a notable exception came when he was pitching for the Boston Red Sox against the Cincinnati Reds in Game 7 of the 1975 World Series. The Red Sox were up 3–0 when, on a 1–0 count, Lee threw an eephus pitch to Tony Pérez with a runner on base. The pitch resulted in a towering two-run home run over the Green Monster that Lee often said afterward "is still rising". The Red Sox were still leading 3-2 when Lee left the game, but they went on to lose the game, 4–3. (Had they won, it would have been their first World Series championship since 1918.)

Utility player Brock Holt used a few eephus pitches during a relief appearance for the Texas Rangers on August 7, 2021, one registering the slowest MLB pitch for a called strike since at least 2008 (the pitch-tracking era) at 31.1 miles per hour (50.1 km/h).

Other pitchers known to have employed the eephus pitch include: Fernando Abad (the "super changeup"), Al McBean (the McBean ball), Luis Tiant, Pedro Borbón, Yu Darvish, Casey Fossum (called the "Fossum Flip"), Steve Hamilton (the folly floater), Liván Hernández, Phil Niekro, Orlando Hernández, Dave LaRoche (LaLob), Carlos Zambrano, Vicente Padilla (dubbed the "soap bubble" by Vin Scully), Satchel Paige, Pascual Pérez (the Pascual Pitch), Kazuhito Tadano, Bob Tewksbury, Carlos Villanueva, Alfredo Simón, Clayton Kershaw, (Note: Kershaw later said the pitch was not what he had intended to throw.) Rich Hill, Zack Greinke and unique wind-mill windup 1930s to 1950s pitcher Bobo Newsom.

The eephus pitch has also been employed by various position players on the rare occasion that they take the mound. Examples include Chicago Cubs catcher Tucker Barnhart, who threw a 39-mph eephus pitch for a strike during a one-inning appearance to close the game against the Boston Red Sox on July 16, 2023, and threw only six pitches — all of them eephus pitches, ranging from 34 to 42 mph—for a single and three outs when he pitched the ninth inning of the Cubs' 8–0 loss to the Atlanta Braves on August 4, 2023. In the ninth inning of an April 6, 2026 game between the Los Angeles Dodgers and the Toronto Blue Jays, both teams put eephus-throwing position players on the mound. Tyler Heineman threw eephus pitches ranging from 39 to 53 mph, allowing no hits, and then in the bottom of the inning Miguel Rojas threw a series of 55-mph eephus pitches, hitting a batter and allowing one run as the Dodgers beat the Blue Jays 14-2.

Other nicknames for the eephus pitch include the balloon ball, blooper ball, gondola, parachute, rainbow pitch—distinct from the rainbow curve—gravity curve, The Monty Brewster (a reference to the titular character in Brewster's Millions), and the Bugs Bunny curve, a reference to the 1946 Bugs Bunny cartoon Baseball Bugs in which several batters in a row swing and miss at a very slow pitch before the ball reaches the plate.

The eephus is sometimes used as part of strategy to confuse batters. On September 20, 2022, Philadelphia Phillies position player Garrett Stubbs, on a rare pitching assignment, used a series of four eephus pitches to put Toronto Blue Jays catcher Danny Jansen behind in the count. The last Stubbs eephus registered 36.9 mph and his next pitch was an 83.8 mph fastball which earned a strikeout against the unprepared Jansen, who saw four consecutive pitches at slow speeds before the faster pitch that struck him out.

== In popular culture ==
The 2024 sports film Eephus, directed by Carson Lund, takes its name from the eephus pitch.
