= Rip Sewell =

American baseball player (1907–1989)

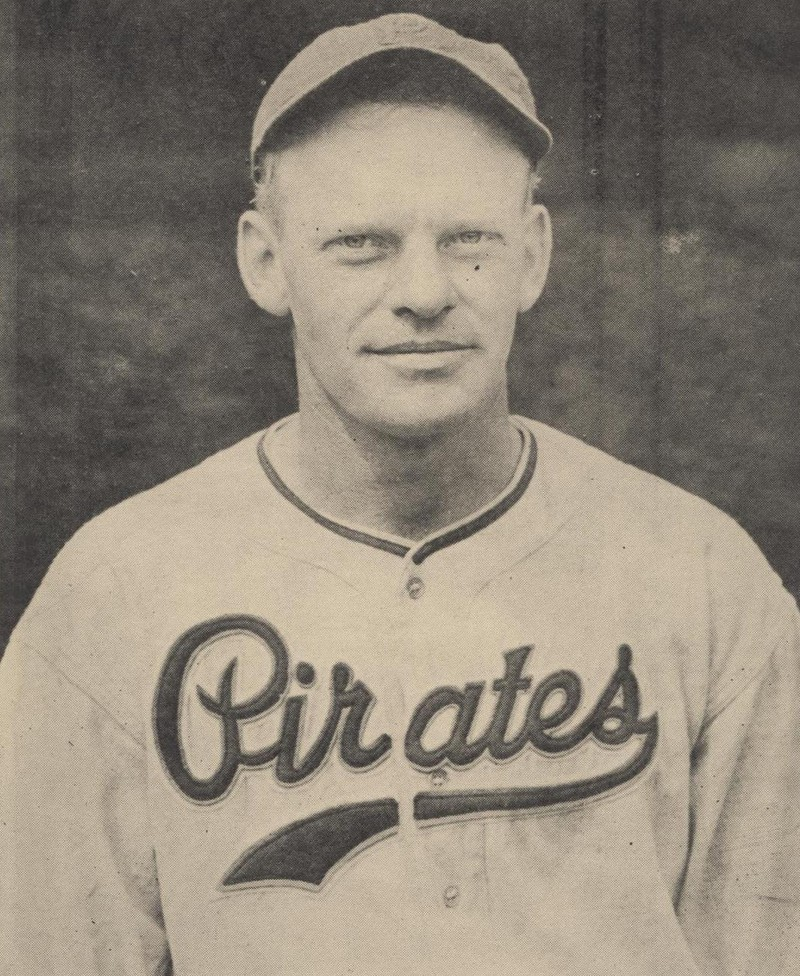
- Sewell, circa 1946
- Pitcher
- Born: May 11, 1907; Decatur, Alabama, U.S.
- Died: September 3, 1989 (aged 82); Plant City, Florida, U.S.
- Batted: Left Threw: Right

MLB debut
- June 14, 1932, for the Detroit Tigers

Last MLB appearance
- September 19, 1949, for the Pittsburgh Pirates

MLB statistics
- Win–loss record: 143–97
- Earned run average: 3.48
- Strikeouts: 636
- Stats at Baseball Reference

Teams
- Detroit Tigers (1932); Pittsburgh Pirates (1938–1949)

Career highlights and awards
- 4× All-Star (1943–1946); NL wins leader (1943)

Truett Banks "Rip" Sewell (May 11, 1907 – September 3, 1989) was an American right-handed starting pitcher in Major League Baseball who played 13 years in the major leagues with the Detroit Tigers (1932) and Pittsburgh Pirates (1938–1949). Sewell was selected four times to the National League All-Star team (1943–1946) and is credited with inventing the "Eephus pitch."

== Early years ==
Born in Decatur, Alabama, Sewell attended Vanderbilt University in the 1930–31 school year, where he played college football on scholarship for coach Dan McGugin. However, Sewell only played on the freshman team and left because of the academic requirements. He signed with the Nashville Vols, who then sold his contract to the Detroit Tigers for $10,000. He played only one season (1932) with the Tigers, appearing mostly in relief. Sewell later recalled that he was shipped to the minor leagues in Toronto the day after Jimmie Foxx hit one of Sewell's best pitches over the left field wall.

== The fight with Greenberg ==
In 1934, he got a second chance with the Tigers, attending spring training with the team. However, he got into a fight with Hank Greenberg in Lakeland, Florida. According to Sewell, Greenberg made a comment about Sewell's southern heritage, and Sewell responded with a comment about Greenberg's Jewish heritage. The fight was eventually broken up by the police, and the next day, Sewell was called in by manager Mickey Cochrane, who told him: "Rip, don't think I feel any less about you for it; in fact, I think more of you, but we've got thirty pitchers and only one first baseman. What do you think I'm going to do?"

Greenberg, however, gave a different account of the fight in his autobiography. According to Greenberg, Sewell kept mouthing off, even after Greenberg asked to be left alone. Greenberg described the fight as follows: "As we got off the bus, I grabbed Sewell and started pummeling him. He couldn't fight, so he grabbed me around the knees. . . . I was embarrassed for him." Tigers pitcher Elden Auker also wrote about the Sewell-Greenberg fight in his autobiography. Auker's account is consistent with Greenberg's. According to Auker, Greenberg "slapped Sewell across the face and pretty near busted his skin open."

== Eephus pitch ==
Sewell threw the blooper pitch by holding onto the seam and flipping it off three fingers to get backspin. Sewell's blooper reached an arc of 25 feet. The first time Sewell threw the blooper in a game was in an exhibition match against the Detroit Tigers. Sewell described the reaction of the Detroit batter, Dick Wakefield: "He started to swing, he stopped, he started again, he stopped, and then he swung and missed it by a mile. I thought everybody was going to fall off the bench, they were laughing so hard."

Perhaps Sewell's most famous blooper pitch came in the 1946 All Star game against Ted Williams. Sewell warned Williams before the game he was going to throw him the blooper. With the American League ahead 8–0, Williams came to bat, and Sewell nodded, indicating the blooper was coming. Williams fouled off the first blooper. Sewell nodded again, and threw another blooper and then another. With the count 1–2, Williams hit the blooper for a home run, the only home run ever hit off Sewell's blooper pitch. As Williams rounded the bases, Sewell followed him, saying, "the only reason you hit it was because I told you it was coming." Williams laughed, the fans loved it, and Sewell received a standing ovation when he walked off the mound.

== Critic of the players' union ==
Sewell was a critic of the American Baseball Guild, the players' union that attempted to organize after World War II. In June 1946, he led Pirate players against the union, and was reported as saying that he was "glad the owners had finally told these ungrateful players where to get off. First they wanted the hamburger, then filet mignon, eventually the cow and the entire pasture."

== See also ==
- List of Major League Baseball annual wins leaders
- Eephus pitch – Very low-speed baseball pitch
