= List of Minnesota Twins owners and executives =

== Owners ==
- Ban Johnson & Fred Postal
- Thomas C. Noyes
- Clark Griffith
- Calvin Griffith
- Carl Pohlad
- Jim Pohlad

== General Managers ==
- Calvin Griffith
- Howard Fox
- Andy MacPhail (1985-1994; Won WS in 1987 and 1991)
- Terry Ryan (1995-2007, again from 2012)
- Bill Smith (2008-2011)
- Terry Ryan (after first stint 1995–2007, 2012 - 2016)
- Rob Antony (interim 2016)
- Thad Levine (2016–2024)
- Jeremy Zoll (2025–present)

== Presidents ==
- Calvin Griffith
- Howard Fox
- Jerry Bell
- Dave St. Peter
- Derek Falvey - President of Baseball Operations

== Other executives ==
- Ossie Bluege
- George Brophy
- Derek Falvey
- Bob Gebhard
- Joe Haynes
- Wayne Krivsky
- Kevin Malone
- Jim Rantz
