= Pohlad =

Pohlad is a surname. Notable people with the surname include:

- Bill Pohlad, American film producer and director
- Carl Pohlad (1915–2009), American financier from Minnesota
- Eloise O'Rourke Pohlad (1917–2003), American benefactor
- Jim Pohlad (born 1953), American businessman
