= Sherry Robertson =

Canadian baseball player

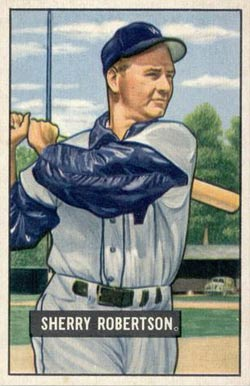
- Utility player
- Born: January 1, 1919; Montreal, Quebec, Canada
- Died: October 23, 1970 (aged 51); Houghton, South Dakota, U.S.
- Batted: Left Threw: Right

MLB debut
- September 8, 1940, for the Washington Senators

Last MLB appearance
- September 21, 1952, for the Philadelphia Athletics

MLB statistics
- Batting average: .230
- Home runs: 26
- Runs batted in: 151
- Stats at Baseball Reference

Teams
- Washington Senators (1940–1941, 1943, 1946–1952); Philadelphia Athletics (1952)

Member of the Canadian

Baseball Hall of Fame
- Induction: 2007

Sherrard Alexander Robertson (January 1, 1919 – October 23, 1970) was a Canadian-American utility player, front office executive, and coach in Major League Baseball (MLB). He played three outfield and three infield positions over his MLB career for the Washington Senators and Philadelphia Athletics, including 109 games as a second baseman, 104 as a right fielder and 98 as a third baseman.

== Member of Griffith baseball dynasty ==
The nephew of Baseball Hall of Fame pitcher, manager and club owner Clark Griffith, Robertson was part of an extended family that operated the Washington Senators/Minnesota Twins franchise of the American League for 72 years. Robertson was a native of Montreal, Quebec, the son of a minor league player; his father was Griffith's brother-in-law. Robertson moved to the Washington, D.C., area with his widowed mother and six siblings when he was a child. He attended the University of Maryland.

Robertson's brother Calvin was raised by Clark Griffith, took his uncle's last name and succeeded him as the Senators' president. Calvin Griffith controlled 52 percent of the team's stock (his 26 percent share in addition to sister Thelma Griffith Haynes' equal stake) and operated the Senators as majority owner from 1955 to 1960. He then moved the club to Minneapolis–St. Paul after the 1960 season, and led the renamed Twins until he sold them in August 1984.

Sherry Robertson was the longtime director of the team's farm system, while Thelma and two other brothers, Jimmy and Billy Robertson, were also club executives. In addition, brother-in-law Joe Haynes, a former Washington pitcher, was an executive vice president of the Senators and Twins; another brother-in-law, Joe Cronin, was a Hall of Fame shortstop who was player-manager of the Senators in 1933–34 (leading them to the 1933 AL pennant), manager and then general manager of the Boston Red Sox (1935–58), and president of the American League (1959–73); and at least two nephews, Clark Griffith II and Bruce Haynes, took active roles in managing the Twins' affairs.

== Career ==
Robertson batted left-handed, threw right-handed, and was listed as 6 feet (1.8 m) tall 180 pounds (82 kg). His playing career extended from 1939 to 1952, with time out for service in the United States Navy Reserve during World War II. He played for his brother Calvin with the Class B Charlotte Hornets in both 1939 and 1940 during Griffith's apprenticeship as a minor league manager.

Robertson saw MLB action with the Senators (1940–41, 1943 and 1946–52) and Philadelphia Athletics (1952). His contract was sold by the Senators to the Athletics on May 13, 1952. In ten seasons he played in 597 games and had 1,507 at bats, scored 200 runs, and compiled 346 hits, 55 doubles, 18 triples, 26 home runs, 151 runs batted in, 32 stolen bases, 202 walks, with a .230 batting average, .323 on-base percentage, .342 slugging percentage, 515 total bases and 14 sacrifice hits.

Robertson succeeded Ossie Bluege as the Senators' farm system director in 1958, then moved to Minnesota along with the franchise after the 1960 season. In his dozen years in that role, the organization produced four Hall of Famers: second baseman and seven-time batting champion Rod Carew, outfielder and three-time batting champ Tony Oliva, southpaw pitcher Jim Kaat, who won 283 games over his 25-year MLB career, and right-hander Bert Blyleven, whose 287-win, 22-year career (1970–90, 1992) began in Robertson's minor league system in 1969. The organization also developed 1965 American League Most Valuable Player Zoilo Versalles, 1959 Rookie of the Year Bob Allison, and other players who turned the Twins into pennant contenders for much of the 1960s. In 1970, Robertson returned to uniform as bench coach for Twins' manager Bill Rigney as the team won the American League West Division championship. Robertson was killed from multiple skull fractures in a single-vehicle accident on October 23, 1970 when his car left the roadway on Highway 10 and struck a tree in Houghton, South Dakota.

He was elected to the Canadian Baseball Hall of Fame in the Class of 2007.

Robertson was the first Major League Baseball player to inadvertently kill a spectator at a baseball game, and the only one ever to do so with a thrown ball. During a 1943 game at Griffith Stadium against the Cleveland Indians, Robertson fielded a grounder hit by Ken Keltner. His throw to first baseman Mickey Vernon was high, and went into the front row of the stands, where it struck 32-year-old Clarence Stagemyer, who, after shaking his head a few times, said he was all right. Nevertheless, the Senators' team doctor looked him over and told him to go to the hospital. Stagemyer did, and died there the following day of concussion and a skull fracture.

=== Navy service ===
Robertson joined the Navy Reserve in 1944. On October 25, 1944, he reported aboard the Naval Air Station Kaneohe Bay, Hawaii as a Specialist (Physical Training Instructor) 1st Class Petty Officer. He played baseball for the NAS Kaneohe Bay Klippers and the Navy All-Stars in 1945.
