= Midwest Federal Savings & Loan =

American bank in Minneapolis, Minnesota, US

- Company type: Savings and loan
- Industry: Financial services
- Founded: 1890
- Defunct: 1989
- Fate: Collapsed as part of the savings and loan crisis and mismanagement
- Headquarters: Minneapolis, Minnesota, United States
- Area served: Minnesota
- Key people: Hal Greenwood, Jr (Chairman convicted for criminal mismanagement)
- Products: Retail banking

Midwest Federal Savings and Loan was an American bank headquartered in Minneapolis, Minnesota that starting in the mid-1960s and collapsed in 1989. Its headquarters were located at 801 Nicollet Mall in what would later be called McGladrey Plaza. Midwest Federal was in business for ninety-nine years until its failure in 1989.

Its collapse was due mostly to bad real estate loans. On April 22, 1991, the St. Paul Pioneer Press called the bank's failure the "largest financial disaster in Minnesota history" and was part of the savings and loan crisis of the 1980s. Midwest Federal had assets of US$3.5 billion (equivalent to $8.1 billion in 2024), was liquidated by the government at a cost of US$1 billion to taxpayers ($2.3 billion in 2024). Midwest was US$1 billion in debt when it was seized by regulators in February 1989.

The former chairman, Harold W. Greenwood, Jr, Donald J. Snede, Charlotte E. Masica, and Robert A. Mampel were indicted on Federal fraud and conspiracy charges involving financial losses at the failed institution. After its collapse, Midwest Savings was eventually placed under the "conservatorship" of the Resolution Trust Corporation (RTC) until its deposits were sold to various parties. The largest share of Midwest's deposits – $638 million – went to Minneapolis banker Carl Pohlad, whose Marquette Bank Minneapolis bought the deposits of eight branches for US$3.2 million.

== History ==
=== Causes of failure ===
The bank was involved with a series of secured and unsecured loans. A primary source of losses was the purchase of the servicing rights to manufactured home loans that were originated by Green Tree, a subsidiary of Midwest Federal's. Midwest then subcontracted with Green Tree to service these loans. It is speculative, but it is believed that Green Tree actively solicited the borrowers of the serviced loan portfolio to refinance. The accelerated prepayment of a significant portion of the servicing portfolio caused the assumptions made about the transaction to not be met and caused a significant loss to Midwest Federal.

On the opposite scale were the unsecured loans to The Jockey Club of Miami, a resort in Miami, Florida, beginning with a US$6 million loan in 1975 ($35.1 million in 2024). The bank continued unsecured loans to the resort until its collapse in 1990.

=== Timeline ===
- March 1988 – Midwest Federal Savings executives lend US$6.5 million (equivalent to $17.3 million in 2024) more to the money losing resort, The Jockey Club of Miami in Miami, after withholding an analysis of the value of the resort from federal examiners.
- February 1989 – Midwest Federal declared insolvent. Chairman Greenwood resigns. The Federal Deposit Insurance Corporation takes control of Midwest Federal.
- May 1989 – Carl Pohlad buys bank deposits.
- March 1990 – Susan Greenwood Olson, a former officer with Midwest Federal Savings and Loan, indicted. The indictment focuses on unsecured loans extended to The Jockey Club of Miami and an inflated appraisal of its value.
- June 1990 – Bank Chairman and Executives indicted on charges of racketeering.
- August 1991 – Bank Chairman Hal Greenwood, Jr is convicted on 27 felony counts arising from criminal mismanagement.
- February 1992 – Hal Greenwood, Jr is sentenced to 46 months in prison and ordered to forfeit US$3.6 million (equivalent to $8.1 million in 2024) for racketeering involving the bank's collapse.
