= Smiley v. Citibank (South Dakota), N. A. =

Smiley v. Citibank
- Supreme Court of the United States

Argued April 24, 1996 Decided June 3, 1996
- Full case name: Barbara Smiley v. Citibank (South Dakota), N. A.
- Citations: 517 U.S. 735 (more) 116 S. Ct. 1730; 135 L. Ed. 2d 25; 1996 U.S. LEXIS 3594

Case history
- Prior: Class action complaint dismissed, Superior Court of California, affirmed by Court of Appeal, 26 Cal. App. 4th 1767, 32 Cal. Rptr. 2d 562 (1994); judgment affirmed, Supreme Court of California, 11 Cal. 4th 138, 900 P.2d 690 (1995); certiorari granted, 516 U.S. ___, (1995)

Holding
- Comptroller of Currency regulation including credit card late fees and other penalties within the definition of interest was reasonable enough that Court defers to its expertise, thus individual states cannot limit them when charged by nationally-chartered banks

Court membership
- Chief Justice William Rehnquist Associate Justices John P. Stevens · Sandra Day O'Connor; Antonin Scalia · Anthony Kennedy; David Souter · Clarence Thomas; Ruth Bader Ginsburg · Stephen Breyer

Case opinion
- Majority: Scalia, joined by unanimous

Laws applied
- National Banking Act

Smiley v. Citibank, 517 U.S. 735 (1996), is a United States Supreme Court decision upholding a regulation of the Comptroller of Currency which included credit card late fees and other penalties within the definition of interest and thus prevented individual states from limiting them when charged by nationally-chartered banks. Justice Antonin Scalia wrote for a unanimous court that the regulation was reasonable enough under the Court's own Chevron standard for the justices to defer to the Comptroller.

The decision, which had begun as a class action in California, was seen as a victory for banks and credit-card issuers, who could mostly charge late fees as they pleased. For that same reason consumer advocates were displeased, warning that late fees could rise to previously unseen levels. They did, and one of the Citibank attorneys has expressed regret for his involvement.

== The case ==
=== Background ===
In its 1978 Marquette Bank decision, the court had unanimously held that the National Banking Act of 1863, which created nationally-chartered banks in addition to the state ones that had previously existed, barred states from enforcing their anti-usury laws, which set caps on interest rates, against any national bank based in another state. In 1980, Citibank took advantage of that decision and moved its money-losing credit-card operations to South Dakota, after persuading that state's legislature and governor to repeal its anti-usury law. Other states and banks followed the example, and by 1990 the number of credit cards in circulation had doubled, while the average household's revolving balance increased more than fivefold. At the time late fees were bringing in $2 billion annually to the industry.

The increased use of more freely available credit changed the American economy, but not without creating some backlash. Consumer advocates complained that some issuers were using late fees of $5 or $10, charged if a single month's payment was even one day overdue, to gouge extra profits from customers who might otherwise be borrowing and spending responsibly. Laws in some states limited those fees, yet companies and banks continued to charge above those limits, claiming the late fees were a form of interest and thus not subject to the laws of those states as long as they were headquartered elsewhere.

=== Litigation and regulation ===
Activist lawyers were challenging this notion in lawsuits across the country, mostly in state courts, with different degrees of success at different levels. In Pennsylvania, Michael Donovan, Michael Malakoff and Ann Miller had filed one of their own, with the intent of taking it to the Supreme Court and forcing a resolution of the issue. Barbara Smiley was a California woman who had filed a class action against Citibank's South Dakota subsidiary in her state's courts in 1992 alleging that the $15 late fee she was charged for her Citibank Classic card violated California law. After reading about the Pennsylvania lawyers in Business Week, she had contacted them to represent her.

Citibank responded to Smiley's original filing with a motion to dismiss on the grounds that late fees were interest covered by the National Banking Act. California's Superior Court in Los Angeles County denied the motion, but after Citibank appealed that denial, the Second District of the California Courts of Appeal ordered the lower court to either grant the motion or explain why it wasn't. The Superior Court granted the motion and dismissed the case, a decision upheld on appeal.

On March 3, 1995, after the Superior Court had dismissed the complaint, the Office of the Comptroller of Currency (OCC), the official charged by the National Banking Act with regulating national banks, issued a proposed regulation defining "interest" under the Act as including "any payment compensating a creditor or prospective creditor ... [for] any default or breach by a borrower of a condition upon which credit was extended." It specifically included late fees, among many others that had been criticized as unfair and misleading to consumers. It was formally adopted a year later.

Later in 1995, the California Supreme Court agreed to review Smiley's case, and did so. It affirmed the lower courts, but with two justices dissenting. Since New Jersey's Supreme Court had reached the opposite conclusion in a similar case, the Supreme Court granted Smiley's certiorari petition.

== Before the Court ==
Donovan argued Smiley's case before the justices. Late fees, he said, were not interest whatever the Comptroller's regulation said since they were fixed amounts and did not vary based on the money owed or schedule of payments. He also pointed to two previous documents from OCC suggesting that, in the past, it did not consider penalty fees of any kind to be interest. For more than a hundred years, he noted, OCC had not seen fit to define specifically what kind of payments were considered interest. Yet, coincidentally, only when a case turning on that issue appeared headed to the Supreme Court did it see a need to do so.

He claimed that it was not entitled to the deference the Court accorded agencies of the executive branch. It was not, he said, a reasonable interpretation of the National Banking Act and thus, per the rule it had established in the 1984 Chevron U.S.A., Inc. v. Natural Resources Defense Council, Inc. case, the Court should review it afresh and rule on whether it was the best interpretation of the statute.

Richard Kendall of the Los Angeles firm Shearman & Sterling argued the case for Citibank. He was joined by Irving Gornstein on behalf of the government as amicus curiae. Both argued for the Court to defer to the Comptroller's statutory interpretation.

== Decision ==
Two months after oral argument, the Court ruled unanimously in Citibank's favor. Antonin Scalia wrote for the Court.

The cases from New Jersey and California, he uncharacteristically agreed, made it "difficult indeed to contend that the word 'interest' in the National Bank Act is unambiguous with regard to the point at issue here." Nevertheless, he rejected all of Donovan's arguments.

The Court did not find the timing of the regulation to be fatal. "[N]either antiquity nor contemporaneity with the statute is a condition of validity." It was "irrelevant" that it was issued in advance of a case to be heard by the Supreme Court. He also found the regulation to be rational. "It seems to us perfectly possible to draw a line, as the regulation does, between [penalties] and ... all other payments." Nor did he find the prior documents in which representatives of the Comptroller's office had said that they did not consider late fees could be considered as interest payments adequately controlling since they did not fully represent an official agency position. "What these statements show, if anything, is that there was good reason for the Comptroller to promulgate the new regulation, in order to eliminate uncertainty and confusion."

After dealing with another issue Donovan raised, that the regulation was not entitled to deference because it pre-empted state laws, by saying two issues had been confused and thus that question was moot, Scalia said "[T]he question before us is not whether it represents the best interpretation of the statute, but whether it represents a reasonable one. The answer is obviously yes." Legal dictionaries of the late 19th century, as well as the Court's own jurisprudence of that era, did not define interest so narrowly, and indeed such flat fees were often intended to evade state anti-usury laws, as state courts of that era had ruled. Finally, he rejected an argument that penalties were inherently separate from interest by suggesting the petitioner had misread the case they were relying on and citing cases he considered more appropriate. The section of the National Banking Act at issue, he noted, did not distinguish between interest and penalties.

== Reaction ==
Lawyers and lobbyists for the credit-card industry, who had feared costly litigation and a myriad of state laws if the Court ruled against OCC, praised the decision. "It's a big victory for the 97 percent or so of cardholders who pay their bills on time," said a Citibank spokeswoman. "There's no reason why those of us who pay on time should subsidize those who do not", said Kendall. That's not equity."

On the other side, Donovan described the result as "an unfortunate interpretation ... that will allow small states to override the longstanding consumer protection laws of more heavily populated ... states." His co-counsel Ann Miller called the decision "incorrect and shortsighted ... I don't think that the answer the U.S. Supreme Court came up with is going to be the long-term resolution of the problems posed by old laws trying to deal with new and very changed banking practices."

Donovan was especially critical of the role played by the OCC. "We got tackled by a player standing on the sideline as we were sprinting toward the goal line". However, it did show him that he'd underestimated the role played by a regulatory body that, as Chief Justice Rehnquist had said during oral argument, had never come before the Court with a regulation that wasn't favorable to the banking industry. "We should have focused more on the appropriateness of an executive agency defining what Congress meant by a law as opposed to a court defining what Congress meant by a law."

== Aftermath ==
Duncan McDonald, formerly general counsel for Citibank's credit-card division, said he and others had merely hoped to have the freedom to set the fees at the $15 they had calculated as a fair market rate, but afterwards some cards late fees went as high as $39.

"I certainly didn't imagine that someday we might've ended up creating Frankenstein," he told PBS's Frontline a decade later. "Millions and millions of people are being excessively charged late fees and bad-check fees and over-the-limit fees and then these 25 percent APRs to make the profits for the industry, so that they can keep the rates lower for people who are rate sensitive, who can in fact shop the system."

On May 22, 2009, the Credit Card Accountability Responsibility and Disclosure Act of 2009 (the Credit CARD Act) was signed into law.

== See also ==
- List of class action lawsuits
- List of United States Supreme Court cases, volume 517
- List of United States Supreme Court cases
- Lists of United States Supreme Court cases by volume
- List of United States Supreme Court cases by the Rehnquist Court
