= Marquette National Bank of Minneapolis v. First of Omaha Service Corp. =

Seminal 1978 U.S. Supreme Court banking-law case

Marquette Bank of Minneapolis v. First of Omaha Service Corp.
- Supreme Court of the United States

Argued October 31, 1978 Decided December 18, 1978
- Full case name: Marquette Nat. Bank v. First of Omaha Svc. Corp.,
- Citations: 439 U.S. 299 (more) 99 S. Ct. 540; 58 L. Ed. 2d 534

Case history
- Prior: State action refiled in district court, then remanded to state court, 422 F. Supp. 1346 (D. Minn. 1976).; injunction in state court overturned by Minnesota Supreme Court on appeal, 262 N.W.2d 358 (Minn. 1977); certiorari granted, 436 U.S. 916 (1978).

Holding
- State anti-usury laws cannot be enforced on nationally chartered banks based in other states; only laws of state in which banks are located apply, and regulation of interest rates on national banks making interstate loans can only be enacted by Congress or the appropriate state legislature

Court membership
- Chief Justice Warren E. Burger Associate Justices William J. Brennan Jr. · Potter Stewart; Byron White · Thurgood Marshall; Harry Blackmun · Lewis F. Powell Jr. William Rehnquist · John P. Stevens

Case opinion
- Majority: Brennan, joined by unanimous

Laws applied
- National Banking Act

Marquette Nat. Bank of Minneapolis v. First of Omaha Service Corp., 439 U.S. 299 (1978), is a unanimous U.S. Supreme Court decision holding that state anti-usury laws regulating interest rates cannot be enforced against nationally chartered banks based in other states. Justice William Brennan wrote that it was clearly the intent of Congress when it passed the National Banking Act that nationally chartered banks would be subject only to federal regulation by the Comptroller of Currency and the laws of the state in which they were chartered, and that only Congress or the appropriate state legislature could pass laws regulating them.

The case has been called one of the most important of the late 20th century, since it freed nationally chartered banks to offer credit cards to anyone in the U.S. they deemed qualified, and more specifically because it allowed them to export credit card interest rates to states with stricter regulations, opening up a race between states in an effort to attract lending institutions to set up shop in their states and offer a wider variety of consumer credit products. Over the next decade, the states accelerated a process that had already begun of repealing or loosening their anti-usury laws, allowing state-chartered banks to compete more equally with national ones. As a result, the use of credit cards has vastly increased, and the mortgage industry soon followed suit.

== Background of the case ==
=== U.S. banking system and anti-usury laws ===
During the Civil War, Congress enacted the National Bank Act, which allowed for nationally chartered banks as well as state-chartered ones and encouraged many existing banks to become national ones. It led to the standardization of U.S. currency and created a dual banking system that has existed ever since.

National banks were subject to regulation by the Comptroller of Currency but had to follow the laws of the states in which they were located. Among these statutes were anti-usury laws, which capped the rates at which banks were allowed to lend money, usually between 10 and 20 percent.

In the late 1970s, these created problems for some banks as the high inflation of that period resulted in them borrowing money at higher rates than they could lend it. In response to this asset–liability mismatch, libertarians and free-market advocates called for interest rate caps to be increased or repealed entirely as an unreasonable restriction on market forces. Bills to do so were introduced in Congress and some state legislatures. Some succeeded in the former goal, but those that sought to eliminate interest rate caps entirely failed.

=== Credit cards ===
The term "credit card" had been used and proposed by utopian author Edward Bellamy in his 1887 book Looking Backward. The first realizations of this model came during the Depression with Chargaplate, meant to encourage customers to spend money by introducing an alternative to cash and checks. Diners Club evolved in the early 50s as the first credit card company; what it provided, however, was a charge card, intended to be paid in full every month, rather than a credit card, designed to entail longer-term lending.

In 1958, Bank of America had introduced BankAmeriCard (today's Visa), the first credit card on a revolving credit model, in which cardholders did not have to pay the full balance each month but merely a minimum payment if they so chose. It, like other banks in those days, tried to promote use of them by mailing cards, unsolicited, to multiple, sometimes randomly chosen, customers in a particular area.

=== Fisher v. First of Omaha Service Corp. ===
In 1969, one of these unsolicited cards, First National Bank of Omaha, came to Iowa resident Fred Fisher. He filed suit in the Southern District of Iowa against the Omaha bank on September 3, 1971, for exporting Nebraska's higher interest rates to his state. He alleged that since that state's legislature had fixed the usury ceiling at nine percent, First National was breaking the law by charging him twice that for an advance of up to $500.

On February 22, 1972, the court ordered the Fisher case be transferred to the U.S. District Court of Nebraska because the Omaha bank had "not waived its privilege of being sued in the district where it was established." In an opinion filed on June 24, 1975, the Nebraska court ruled that the interest rate which First National may legally charge in Iowa is governed by the usury laws of the state "where the extension of credit occurs" and that since the credit was extended in Omaha where the 18 percent interest rate was not usurious, it was entirely within the legal bounds in Iowa as well.

On November 1, 1974, the Iowa attorney general, Richard C. Turner, filed a petition with the District Court, requesting a permanent injunction enjoining the Omaha bank and a Des Moines bank from assessing or collecting a finance charge in excess of the amount permitted by the Iowa Consumer Credit Code. The court ruled in favor of the defendants. In 1977, the United States Court of Appeals for the Eighth Circuit affirmed the judgment of the District Court in the Fisher case, saying that First National's card program should not be restrained or restricted in any way because it "promotes and facilitates, rather than limits or inhibits, interstate trade and commerce.

In Iowa, on August 30, 1978, the Iowa Supreme Court threw out the lower court decisions and ruled in favor of both Fisher and the attorney general. As a result, First National filed an appeal with the U.S. Supreme Court on September 11 and hired Robert H. Bork to argue its Minnesota case before the justices.

=== Marquette Bank ===
At the same time, some residents of Minnesota were being offered cards by First National of Omaha, at similar terms. Marquette National Bank of Minneapolis, which was chartered in the state and also offering credit cards, confronted First National Bank of Omaha and informed them that what they were doing with the interest rate was illegal, since Minnesota's capped interest rates at 12 percent (without specifying what kind of debt). Marquette threatened to take the Omaha bank to the U.S. Supreme Court if necessary if their practice continued.

Marquette began to lobby for the passage of a state law designed to put a 12 percent ceiling on all bank credit card outstandings. In May 1976, about one month after that measure was signed into law, Marquette filed a suit in Hennepin County court to enjoin First Omaha from offering credit cards at the higher interest rate in Minnesota. It was first removed to federal court, where the judge sent it back to state court, which ruled in favor of Marquette. The Minnesota Supreme Court overturned that ruling on appeal.

== Before the Court ==
During oral argument, Justice Thurgood Marshall gave his analysis of the case. He asked the Marquette attorney if he was correct in stating that the citizens of Minnesota can go to their bank and get a credit card at 12 percent. The attorney agreed. Justice Marshall again asked the Marquette attorney if he was correct in stating that First National Bank of Omaha is sending mailing solicitations into his territory and signing up a large number of citizens. The attorney agreed. Finally, Justice Marshall asked the Marquette attorney, "You're claiming that the Omaha bank is taking customers away from Marquette?" The attorney agreed. Justice Marshall concluded that the bank does not have a legal problem, but that they have a marketing problem.

== Decision ==
On December 18, 1978, the high court, fully agreeing with Marshall's analysis, ruled unanimously in First National Bank's favor. The decision maintained that the 115-year-old National Bank Act takes precedence over usury statutes in individual states. Justice William Brennan wrote that the 1863 law permitted a national bank to charge interest at the rate allowed by the regulations of the state in which the lending institution is located.

Brennan rejected Marquette National's argument that just because First National was soliciting credit card customers in Minnesota, it was "located" in that state for purposes of the credit card program. "Minnesota residents were always free to visit Nebraska and receive loans in that state." It hadn't been suggested that Minnesota's laws would apply in that instance, he added. Therefore, they shouldn't be applied just because "the convenience of modern mail" allowed Minnesotans to get credit without having to visit Nebraska. He dismissed another of the plaintiffs' arguments, that the National Banking Act had also intended to preserve "competitive equality", between state and national banks by citing language from the original adoption of the statute and supporting documents to demonstrate that it was always Congress's intent to create a national banking system. The Court itself had taken notice of interstate lending as early as 1839, and the 1863 Congress, Brennan said, was equally aware of such transactions and did not wish to discourage them.

In the closing paragraph, he conceded one of the plaintiffs' arguments, that a ruling in First of Omaha's favor would make it difficult or impossible for states to enforce their anti-usury laws. But, he said, that had been the case since the National Banking Act was passed. "This impairment may in fact be accentuated by the ease with which interstate credit is available by mail through the use of modern credit cards," he allowed. "But the protection of state usury laws is an issue of legislative policy, and any plea to alter [the law] to further that end is better addressed to the wisdom of Congress than to the judgment of this Court."

On July 25, 1979, the Iowa Supreme Court overturned the decision they made on August 30, 1978.

== Aftermath ==
The decision attracted little notice at the time. Two years later, the possibilities it opened up became clearer when Citibank, squeezed by interest rate caps, decided to move its credit-card operations out of New York City. The company persuaded Bill Janklow, then governor of South Dakota, whose agricultural economy was struggling at the time due to high fuel prices, to persuade that state's legislature to formally invite the bank there, as required by federal law before a national bank can do business from a state. He then successfully lobbied the legislators to pass a bill drafted by the bank that repealed the state's cap on interest rates, something a small group of legislators were already trying to do. Citibank quickly moved the 300 white-collar jobs in its credit-card division to Sioux Falls, where it has been ever since.

South Dakota lured a few more large credit operators, such as Wells Fargo, before corporation-friendly Delaware repealed its anti-usury laws as well. Several other states also repealed their interest-rate caps, more lenders entered the credit-card field and introduced newer products and by 1990 the amount of credit cards in use in the U.S. had more than doubled. Credit cards, once a loss leader for the banks that issued them, became a major profit center as banks aggressively marketed them to "revolvers", customers who carried large balances but rarely paid more than the monthly minimum, resulting in large interest payments to the bank.

In the 1990s, Citibank's South Dakota operations would figure in a related Supreme Court case, Smiley v. Citibank. This time state regulations on the late fees charged by credit-card issuers were challenged, and again the court ruled unanimously that they were also pre-empted by the National Banking Act, as interpreted by the Comptroller of Currency.

== Criticism ==
Critics and defenders of the credit-card industry have agreed that Marquette Bank opened the door for vast changes in how it does business. The former have often criticized the Court's ruling in the process.

"[W]e effectively engaged in the single biggest policy change in the credit area, the whole consumer credit area, through an obscure Supreme Court decision interpreting some ambiguous language," Massachusetts senator and former Harvard Law professor Elizabeth Warren, a frequent critic of the consumer-credit industry. "In terms of changing our lives", says Chicago labor lawyer Thomas Geoghegan, "it may be the biggest case of our lifetimes."

"The effect was to gut every state law on usury", he says. The 1863 Congress, Geoghegan complains, couldn't have imagined credit cards when it passed the National Banking Act. He conceded that Brennan's opinion is technically right, but speculates that the justice thought Congress would step into the gap afterwards and enact a national credit-card rate cap, although that was politically unlikely at the time. In 1991 New York Senator Al D'Amato, a harsh critic of the credit-card industry, introduced a bill that would have capped credit card interest rates at 14% in response to a suggestion by President George H. W. Bush. His colleagues passed it overwhelmingly after half an hour of debate; the stock market fell, though the cause is disputed. It was never voted on in the House, and soon Congress focused on studying the industry's lending practices rather than capping interest rates.

Defenders of Marquette Bank point to increased competition in the credit card market as a positive result. "Contrary to the conventional wisdom, Marquette did not lay a foundation for runaway bank profits and consumer suffering," says George Mason University School of Law professor Todd Zywicki. "Rather, by eliminating archaic and largely ineffective usury restrictions, Marquette increased efficiency and competition in the credit card industry, made the market more responsive to consumer demand, and provided large benefits to consumers." Specifically, he cites the shift from retailer-issued credit to third-party bank credit as the biggest component of this change made possible.

On May 22, 2009, the Credit Card Accountability Responsibility and Disclosure Act of 2009 (the Credit CARD Act), which limited the ways that banks could charge credit card customers, was signed into law.
