= Thelma Griffith Haynes =

Canadian-American sports team owner

- Born: Thelma Mae Robertson; July 25, 1913; Montreal, Quebec, Canada
- Died: October 15, 1995 (aged 82); Orlando, Florida, U.S.
- Occupation: Major League Baseball team owner (Minnesota Twins)
- Years active: 1955–1984

Thelma Mae Griffith Haynes (July 25, 1913 – October 15, 1995) was a Canadian–American club owner (1955–84) in Major League Baseball.

Born Thelma Mae Robertson to Scottish parents in Montréal, Québec, she was the niece of Clark Griffith, a former star pitcher who became manager (1912–20) and then principal owner and president of the Washington Senators (1920 until his death in 1955). The Senators relocated to Minneapolis–Saint Paul in the autumn of 1960 and have been known as the Minnesota Twins since 1961.

Haynes' father, James Robertson, was a Canadian minor league baseball player who died in 1922, leaving behind a widow and seven young children. Clark Griffith's wife, Anne ("Addie"), James Robertson's sister, took Thelma and eldest son Calvin Robertson into her Washington, D.C., home, and although Thelma and Calvin were never formally adopted, both assumed the Griffith surname. Their mother and siblings also relocated from Montréal to the Washington suburb of Takoma Park. Calvin Griffith was groomed to succeed his uncle, who was childless, as the Senators' owner, president and de facto general manager.

In October 1955, Clark Griffith died at age 85, leaving his 52 percent majority interest in the Senators evenly split between Calvin and Thelma. She served as treasurer and executive vice president of the Senators/Twins and allowed her brother to vote her shares as well as his own. This ensured that the team remained in the hands of the Griffith–Robertson family until it was purchased on August 15, 1984, by Carl Pohlad; the family's share of the Twins reportedly was sold for $32 million.

Thelma wed a former Washington pitcher, Joe Haynes of the Chicago White Sox, in 1941. Joe would later return to the Senators/Twins as a player, coach and front office executive until his death in January 1967. Their son, Bruce Haynes, also was an executive with the Twins' franchise. The family also included brother-in-law Joe Cronin, like Clark Griffith a Baseball Hall of Fame player (and later a manager, general manager and American League president), brother Sherry Robertson, who played, coached and served as farm system director for the Senators/Twins franchise, and two other brothers, Jimmy and Billy Robertson, who were also team executives.

Thelma Griffith Haynes relocated from Minnesota to Florida in 1982 and died at 82 on October 15, 1995, in Orlando, the team's longtime spring training home, after suffering a stroke.
