= Joe Cronin Award =

The Joe Cronin Award was an award issued by the American League from 1973 through 1999. It was not issued every year within that period but, in some years, was issued more than once. The award was named for Joe Cronin who served as a player, manager, and general manager in the American League and was later elected league president. It was created to recognize and reward players for significant achievement during the year.

Nolan Ryan became the first recipient of the award in 1973. He, George Brett, Cal Ripken Jr., and Roger Clemens are the only players to win the award more than once, each earning the honor on two occasions.

== Winners ==
Season	Winner	Team
1973	Nolan Ryan	California Angels
1974	Al Kaline	Detroit Tigers
1975	Rod Carew	Minnesota Twins
1976	Jim Palmer	Baltimore Orioles
1977	Brooks Robinson	Baltimore Orioles
1978	Jim Rice	Boston Red Sox
1978	Ron Guidry	New York Yankees
1979	Carl Yastrzemski	Boston Red Sox
1980	George Brett	Kansas City Royals
1981	Rollie Fingers	Milwaukee Brewers
1982	Rickey Henderson	Oakland Athletics
1983	Dan Quisenberry	Kansas City Royals
1984	No Winner Chosen	N/A
1985	No Winner Chosen	N/A
1986	Roger Clemens	Boston Red Sox
1987	Paul Molitor	Milwaukee Brewers
1988	Jose Canseco	Oakland Athletics
1989	Nolan Ryan	Texas Rangers
1990	Dave Stewart	Oakland Athletics
1991	Cal Ripken Jr.	Baltimore Orioles
1992	George Brett	Kansas City Royals
1992	Robin Yount	Milwaukee Brewers
1993	Dave Winfield	Minnesota Twins
1994	No Winner Chosen	N/A
1995	Cal Ripken Jr.	Baltimore Orioles
1996	No Winner Chosen	N/A
1997	No Winner Chosen	N/A
1998	Roger Clemens	Toronto Blue Jays
1999	Wade Boggs	Tampa Bay Rays
