= 1956 Baseball Hall of Fame balloting =

Elections to the Baseball Hall of Fame

National Baseball

Hall of Fame and Museum
- New inductees: 2
- via BBWAA: 2
- Total inductees: 81
- Induction date: July 23, 1956

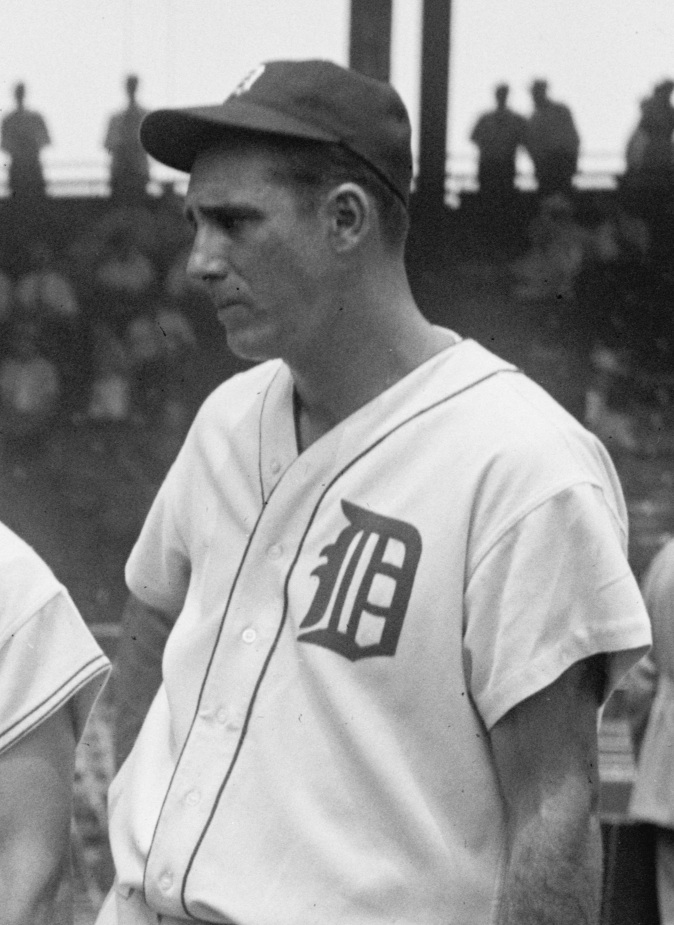
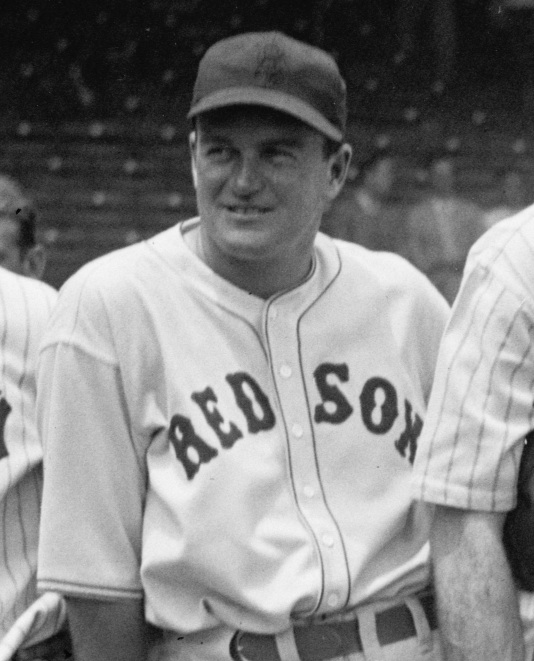
1956 inductees Hank Greenberg (left) and Joe Cronin

Elections to the Baseball Hall of Fame for 1956 followed a system that had been the object of criticism and reform in recent years, which would continue that summer. The Veterans Committee was meeting only in odd-number years to consider older major league players as well as managers, umpires, and executives. The Baseball Writers' Association of America (BBWAA) voted by mail to select from recent players and elected two, Joe Cronin and Hank Greenberg. A formal induction ceremony was held in Cooperstown, New York, on July 23, 1956, with Commissioner of Baseball Ford Frick presiding.

== Criticism and reform ==
Following the election, complaints by the writers that the electees were not up to the standards of previous choices, and that the eligible players included few strong candidates, led to a number of changes in the rules. Foremost among the alterations was the decision to hold future BBWAA elections only in alternating years with the Veterans Committee, and also the elimination of the rule which required writers to vote for 10 candidates; thereafter, they would be advised only to vote for up to 10.

Various factors over the previous few years had led to the voters' complaints regarding the strength of the eligible candidates. Among these were the decision in the early 1950s to extend the waiting period for eligibility following a player's retirement from one year to five years; as a result, many players who retired in the early 1950s and would otherwise have been eligible were temporarily taken out of contention. Also, many of the players who retired in the late 1940s and early 1950s had careers which were interrupted by military service during World War II, depriving them of accomplishments during those seasons which might have enhanced their qualifications in the eyes of voters. Some players returned from the war with their skills in decline after the long layoff, and retired within a few years when they might otherwise have enjoyed several productive seasons if not for the interruption in their play; in other cases, similar players who might have become more distinct with a few added seasons ended up with careers which were more difficult to distinguish. Perhaps most significantly, the Hall of Fame had instituted a rule at the beginning of the decade which was designed to ensure that the honor of selection was not exploited for profit as a mere gate attraction, and that players who were selected were not put into games long after their playing ability had waned simply to sell tickets; as a result, any individual who was still in uniform as a manager or coach – even at the minor league level – had been ruled ineligible for selection. (At the time, managers and coaches were widely regarded as being full members of the roster; playing managers and coaches were still very common, and even minor league managers not generally thought of as playing managers often inserted themselves into games in emergency situations.)

== BBWAA election ==
The BBWAA was authorized to elect players active in 1926 or later, but not after 1950. All 10-year members of the BBWAA were eligible to vote.

Any candidate receiving votes on at least 75% of the ballots would be honored with induction to the Hall. Votes were cast for 106 players; a total of 193 ballots were cast, with 145 votes required for election. A total of 1,599 individual votes were cast, an average of 8.28 per ballot.

The two candidates who received 75% of the vote and were elected are indicated in bold italics; candidates who have since been elected in subsequent elections are indicated in italics.

Player	Votes	Percent	Change
**Hank Greenberg**	164	85.0	▲22.5%
**Joe Cronin**	152	78.8	▲25.0%
Red Ruffing	97	50.3	▲26.4%
Edd Roush	91	47.2	▲8.6%
Lefty Gomez	89	46.1	▲17.8%
Hack Wilson	74	38.3	▲6.0%
Max Carey	65	33.7	▼13.7%
Tony Lazzeri	64	33.2	▲6.9%
Kiki Cuyler	55	28.5	▲14.6%
Hank Gowdy	49	25.4	▼10.5%
Sam Rice	45	23.3	▲12.1%
Chuck Klein	44	22.8	▲12.8%
Jim Bottomley	42	21.8	▲11.4%
Waite Hoyt	37	19.2	▲6.1%
Red Faber	34	17.6	▲6.8%
Joe Medwick	31	16.1	-
Eppa Rixey	27	14.0	▲10.8%
Zack Wheat	26	13.5	▼6.8%
Goose Goslin	26	13.5	▲10.7%
Burleigh Grimes	25	13.0	▲11.8%
Ross Youngs	19	13.0	▼9.3%
Lloyd Waner	18	9.3	-
Jimmie Wilson	17	8.8	▲3.6%
Chick Hafey	16	8.3	▲6.7%
Muddy Ruel	16	8.3	▲3.9%
Dave Bancroft	15	7.8	▲0.2%
Luke Appling	14	7.3	▲6.1%
Earle Combs	14	7.3	▲6.9%
Jesse Haines	14	7.3	▲3.3%
Travis Jackson	14	7.3	▲5.3%
Heinie Manush	13	6.7	-
Paul Derringer	12	6.2	▲5.8%
Babe Herman	11	5.7	▲3.7%
Cy Williams	11	5.7	▲4.5%
Arky Vaughan	9	4.7	▲3.1%
Howard Ehmke	8	4.1	-
Ernie Lombardi	8	4.1	-
Wes Ferrell	7	3.6	-
Pepper Martin	7	3.6	-
Bobby Doerr	5	2.6	-
Lefty O'Doul	5	2.6	-
Bucky Walters	5	2.6	-
Doc Cramer	4	2.1	-
Joe Gordon	4	2.1	▲1.7%
Earl Averill	3	1.6	▲0.8%
Tommy Bridges	3	1.6	-
George Earnshaw	3	1.6	▲0.8%
Freddie Fitzsimmons	3	1.6	-
Freddie Lindstrom	3	1.6	-
Frank McCormick	3	1.6	-
Red Rolfe	3	1.6	-
Joe Sewell	3	1.6	▲1.2%
Johnny Vander Meer (Note: Vander Meer received votes despite being ineligible, as he last played in the major leagues in 1951.)	3	1.6	-
Glenn Wright	3	1.6	Steady
Ossie Bluege	2	1.0	-
Lou Boudreau	2	1.0	-
Guy Bush	2	1.0	-
Mort Cooper	2	1.0	-
Hughie Critz	2	1.0	-
Lew Fonseca	2	1.0	-
Tommy Henrich	2	1.0	-
Billy Herman	2	1.0	-
Joe Judge	2	1.0	▲0.2%
Charlie Keller	2	1.0	-
George Kelly	2	1.0	-
Hal Schumacher	2	1.0	▲0.6%
Riggs Stephenson	2	1.0	-
Jim Tobin	2	1.0	-
Nick Altrock	1	0.5	-
Wally Berger	1	0.5	-
Max Bishop	1	0.5	▲0.1%
Dolph Camilli	1	0.5	-
Spud Chandler	1	0.5	-
Frankie Crosetti	1	0.5	-
Tony Cuccinello	1	0.5	-
Bill Dinneen	1	0.5	-
Joe Dugan	1	0.5	-
Leo Durocher	1	0.5	-
Jimmy Dykes	1	0.5	▲0.1%
Rick Ferrell	1	0.5	-
Mule Haas	1	0.5	▲0.1%
Stan Hack	1	0.5	-
Bill Hallahan	1	0.5	-
Bob Johnson	1	0.5	-
Sam Jones	1	0.5	▲0.1%
Joe Kuhel	1	0.5	-
Al López	1	0.5	-
Dolf Luque	1	0.5	-
Marty Marion	1	0.5	-
Bob Meusel	1	0.5	▼0.3%
Johnny Mostil	1	0.5	-
Jack Quinn	1	0.5	-
Allie Reynolds	1	0.5	-
Phil Rizzuto	1	0.5	-
Al Schacht	1	0.5	-
Wally Schang	1	0.5	-
Everett Scott	1	0.5	▼2.7%
Bill Sherdel	1	0.5	▲0.1%
Earl Smith	1	0.5	-
Gus Suhr	1	0.5	-
Jim Turner	1	0.5	-
George Uhle	1	0.5	-
Bill Wambsganss	1	0.5	▼1.5%
Burgess Whitehead	1	0.5	-
Earl Whitehill	1	0.5	-
Ken Williams	1	0.5	-

Key to colors
Elected to the Hall. These individuals are also indicated in **bold italics**.
Players who were elected in future elections. These individuals are also indicated in plain italics.
