= Howard Fox (baseball executive) =

American baseball executive

- Born: September 4, 1920; Emporia, Virginia, U.S.
- Died: June 28, 2011 (aged 90); Orlando, Florida, U.S.
- Occupation: Baseball executive

Howard Tall Fox Jr. (September 4, 1920 – June 28, 2011) was an American Major League Baseball front office executive. He was a member of the Minnesota Twins organization for more than 60 years, and served as president of the club in 1985 and 1986, following its sale by longtime owner Calvin Griffith to Carl Pohlad.

A native of Emporia, Virginia, Fox attended Virginia Polytechnic Institute and served in the United States Army during World War II, rising to the rank of captain.

Fox joined the franchise that would become the Twins in the late 1940s, when the team was still known as the Washington Senators, as business manager of its Emporia Nationals farm club in the Class D Virginia League. He then moved to the parent team in Washington as publicity director and traveling secretary, and accompanied the Senators to Minneapolis–St. Paul when the franchise relocated after the 1960 season. Fox was promoted to executive vice president of the Twins in the 1970s, and, after his term as club president, he became chairman of the Twins' executive committee, serving into 2011, the year of his death. During his tenure, the Twins won three American League pennants and the 1987 and 1991 World Series.

He died at age 90 in Orlando, Florida, which served as the spring training home of the Senators and Twins during the Griffith era.
