= Calvin Griffith =

American baseball team owner (1911–1999)

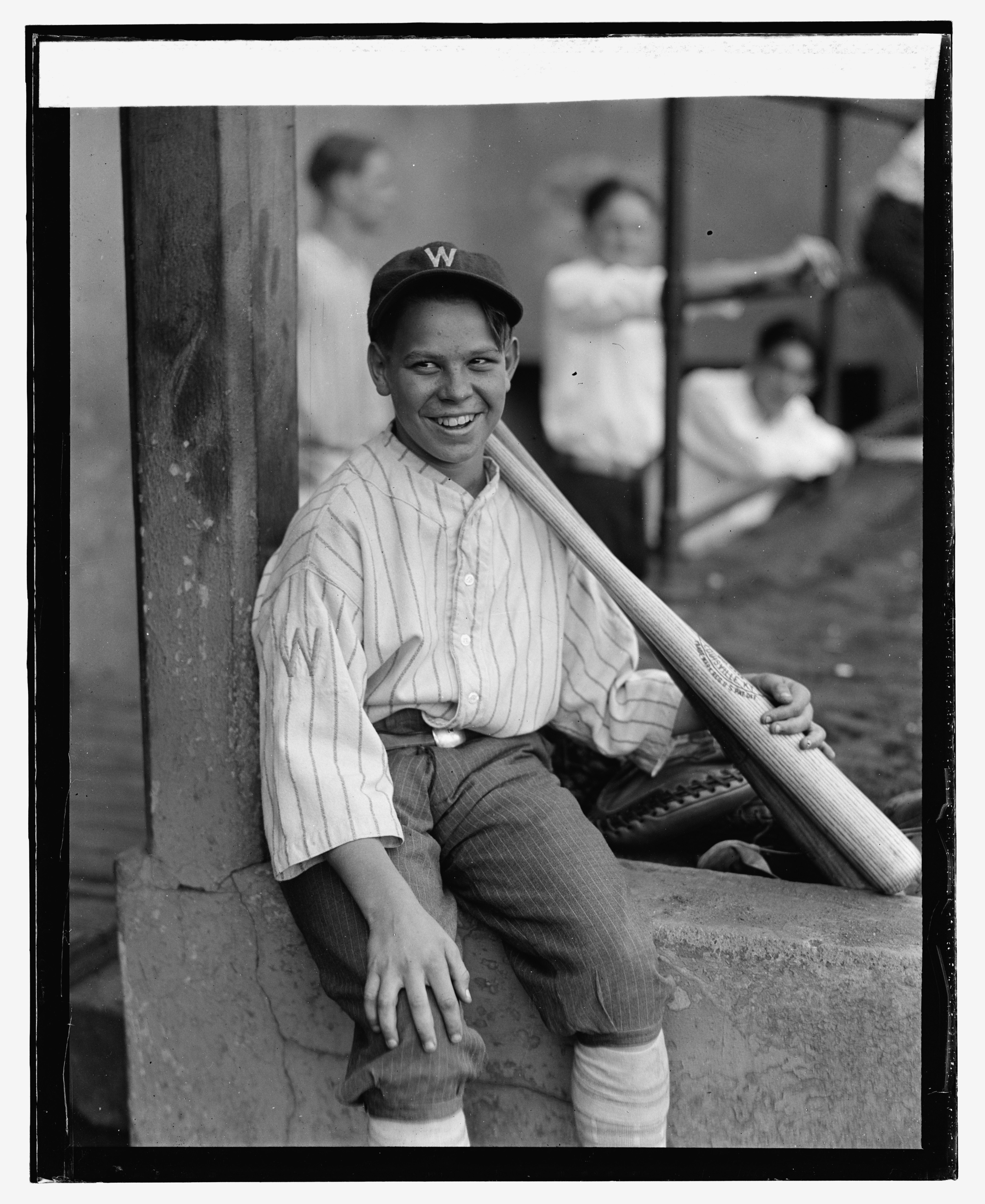
- Thirteen-year-old Griffith as a batboy for the Washington Senators in 1925
- Born: Calvin Griffith Robertson; December 1, 1911; Montreal, Quebec, Canada
- Died: October 20, 1999 (aged 87); Melbourne, Florida, U.S.
- Occupation: Major League Baseball team owner
- Years active: 1955–1984
- Known for: Owner of the Washington Senators/Minnesota Twins
- Notable work: Relocated the Senators to Minneapolis–Saint Paul to create the Twins (1960)
- Baseball career

Member of the Canadian

Baseball Hall of Fame
- Induction: 2010

Calvin Robertson Griffith (December 1, 1911 – October 20, 1999), born Calvin Griffith Robertson, was a Canadian-born American Major League Baseball team owner. As president, majority owner and de facto general manager of the Washington Senators/Minnesota Twins franchise of the American League from 1955 through 1984, he orchestrated the transfer of the Senators after 60 years in Washington, D.C., to Minneapolis–Saint Paul in the autumn of 1960 to create the Twins. He was famous for his devotion to the game and for his sayings. He was the last MLB owner who had no income apart from his franchise.

On June 19, 2020, the Minnesota Twins removed his statue from Target Field regarding what the Twins called "racist comments he made in Waseca in 1978", admitting a racial motivation to moving the Senators from Washington D.C.

== Early life ==
He was born in Montreal, Quebec, as Calvin Griffith Robertson, the son of James A. Robertson and the former Jane Barr Davies. His father was a native of the Shetland Islands who emigrated to Canada and became a minor league baseball player. Robertson had a tryout with the Montreal Royals of the high minors before his career washed out and he became a newspaper distributor. Troubled by alcoholism, he died in 1922, leaving a widow and seven young children in Montreal in dire circumstances. But a sister, Anne ("Addie") Robertson, had moved to the United States, where in 1900 she married Clark Griffith, a future Hall of Fame pitcher who became a manager (Chicago White Sox, New York Highlanders, Cincinnati Reds and Washington Senators) during the first two decades of the 20th century, and then president and chief stockholder of the Senators after 1920.

Clark and Addie Griffith had been concerned for some time about James' alcoholism. After he died, the childless Griffiths took Calvin and a sister, Thelma, into their Washington home in 1923, when Calvin was 11 years old. The two children both assumed the Griffith surname, even though they were never formally adopted. Their mother and siblings moved to nearby Takoma Park, Maryland.

Griffith was a batboy for the Senators, including during their 1924 World Series championship. During the 1925 World Series, United Press published short articles written by Griffith and the batboy for the opposing team, the Pittsburgh Pirates (who won the series).

== Baseball club ownership and operations ==
=== Washington (1955–1960) ===
The senior Griffith owned the Senators until his death at age 85 in October 1955; the team then passed into the hands of Calvin, 43, who had worked his way up through a variety of positions since the 1920s. After starting as a batboy, he attended Staunton Military Academy in Virginia and George Washington University in the U.S. capital. Then, he was a minor league player and manager (serving a brief stint under Joe Engel and the Chattanooga Lookouts at Engel Stadium) before he joined the Washington front office in 1941, eventually becoming executive vice president. Calvin and his sister, now Thelma Griffith Haynes, each inherited half of their uncle's 52 percent stake in the Senators. For the next 29 years, Thelma voted her shares along with her brother's, giving Calvin effective control of the team.

Other Robertson children also assumed important positions with the Senators. Three of Calvin's brothers — Sherry, Jimmy and Billy Robertson — became team executives, as did Thelma's husband, former pitcher Joe Haynes. Meanwhile, brother-in-law Joe Cronin, a Hall of Fame shortstop married to sister Mildred Robertson, served as playing manager of the Senators and then the Boston Red Sox. Cronin eventually became general manager of the Red Sox and then president of the American League. Calvin's son Clark Griffith II and nephews Bruce Haynes and Tom Cronin held executive posts in the Twins' front office.

==== On the field: Sluggers and struggles ====
Under Calvin's ownership, the left-field dimensions of cavernous Griffith Stadium were immediately shortened. Although the distance along the left-field foul line decreased by only 14 feet (4.3 m) to 388 feet (118 m) in 1956, the left-center-field power alley was reduced to 360 feet (110 m); a 6 ft (1.8 m)-high inner fence made the new contour even friendlier to right-handed power hitters. The original dimensions were favored by the late Clark Griffith, who, as a former moundsman, built his successful early 20th-century teams on pitching, speed, gap-to-gap hitting, and defense. The pennant-contending 1945 Senators, who fell short of the AL championship by 11/2 games, hit only one home run—an inside-the-park blow by Joe Kuhel on September 7—in 2,601 home at bats all season. The 1955 Senators hit 20 home runs at Griffith Stadium during their 77-game home schedule.

The 1956 club, with the new dimensions in place, slugged 63 long balls at their home park, and Washington clubs of the late 1950s featured powerful right-handed hitters like Roy Sievers, Jim Lemon, Bob Allison and Hall of Famer Harmon Killebrew. Sievers (1957) and Killebrew (1959) established a new Senators' single-season home run record with 42 blasts to lead (or, in Killebrew's case, co-lead) the American League in that category.

However, the Washington pitching staff bore the immediate brunt of the changes to the ballpark. The 1955 Senators posted a 4.62 staff earned run average—4.01 at Griffith Stadium. One year later, the staff ERA jumped to 5.33—with an abysmal 5.55 ERA at home. To Griffith's credit, however, his pitching staff (led by ace right-hander Camilo Pascual) began to post respectable earned run averages beginning in 1958 and by 1960, the Senators' ERA was down to 3.77 (3.88 at Griffith Stadium).

Calvin Griffith also invested in Washington's traditionally weak farm system and scouting operations. In 1946, The Sporting News' Official Baseball Guide showed only three full-time scouts on the Senators' org chart, although one of them was Joe Cambria, who established a pipeline of playing talent from Cuba to the franchise that endured until his death in 1962. The 1951 TSN Baseball Guide listed eight scouts on the Senators' staff. But by 1960, the team's last year in Washington, the same annual listed 23 full-time talent hunters working on the Senators' behalf. The changes to the farm system were less dramatic. Historically, Clark Griffith's farm system was concentrated on low-level minor league teams. For most of Clark's tenure as owner, Double-A Chattanooga—on paper, two rungs below the majors—was Washington's top farm team, and the Senators' only other farm teams were Class A Charlotte and Class D (equivalent to a Rookie-level team in today's system) Orlando. Calvin added Triple-A affiliates, first in 1956 and then, for good, in 1960. Even then, the team usually fielded 6–8 affiliates throughout the 1950s, and the 1960 Senators actually sponsored one fewer team than the 1951 club.

Griffith also began to invest, cautiously, in bonus babies, with Killebrew a notable success. The proof of his endeavors was in the pudding: by 1960, his Senators featured home-grown players like Killebrew, Allison, Pascual, Pedro Ramos, Jim Kaat (elected to the Hall of Fame in 2021) and Zoilo Versalles. He also obtained young talent like Earl Battey, who was the team's starting catcher from 1960 to 1967, and power-hitting prospect Don Mincher, both acquired for Sievers in April 1960, and starting pitcher Jack Kralick, signed as a minor league free agent the previous season. The trio came to Washington from the White Sox.

==== Off the field: Relocation efforts ====
But the results of Griffith's efforts were initially hard to detect. The 1956–59 Senators averaged 95 losses each season, with three last place finishes in a row (1957–59). Attendance hovered below 500,000 until 1959, when it improved to 615,000. The 1954 move of the St. Louis Browns to nearby Baltimore as the Orioles (a move Calvin had adamantly opposed) dampened the Senators' regional appeal, even though the Orioles of the 1950s were also mainstays in the American League's second division.

Even before his uncle's death, Calvin had doubts about whether the Senators could survive in Washington. Not only was Griffith Stadium the smallest stadium in the majors, but the surrounding neighborhood had already gone to seed. At the 1956 World Series, Griffith, not even a year into his tenure as the Senators' president and majority owner, began preliminary talks with Los Angeles city and county officials about a potential transfer to the West Coast. Brooklyn Dodgers' owner Walter O'Malley, learning of Griffith's interest and thwarted by New York City officials in his plans to replace his decaying ballpark, Ebbets Field, soon supplanted Griffith as Los Angeles' prime target. The Senators also attracted other suitors: The Washington Post reported in the autumn of 1956 that the club's board of directors had received (and rejected) feelers from San Francisco, Louisville — and Minneapolis. The Senators still owned their home ballpark, but Washington was considering building a new, publicly financed facility in a location Griffith disliked, saying it was too far from the team's traditional fan base in the District's northwest suburbs. Under the plan, Griffith's main tenants, the Washington Redskins of the National Football League, would abandon Griffith Stadium for the new District of Columbia Stadium (which they did upon its completion in the fall of 1961). While the new facility was intended for the Senators as well, Griffith and the District could not agree on rental terms.

By this time, it was an open secret that the Senators were a candidate for relocation. Like his uncle before him, Griffith had no income apart from the Senators. However, American League owners were reluctant to antagonize the United States Congress (and jeopardize baseball's exemption from antitrust laws) by moving the Senators out of town without a suitable succession plan. Indeed, Griffith himself publicly testified that he intended to keep the Senators in the capital as long as he could make ends meet.

Even then, however Griffith had begun to seriously discuss moving his club to the Twin Cities of Minneapolis–Saint Paul in September 1959, but talks stalled. The area's hole card was Metropolitan Stadium in Bloomington, roughly halfway between Minneapolis and St. Paul. While it had opened in 1956 for the Triple-A Minneapolis Millers, its real purpose was to attract a major league team to the Twin Cities. It had been built to major league specifications, and could easily be doubled in size to 40,000 seats in order to accommodate a major league team. Griffith had initially been skeptical of moving the Senators there because of Minnesota's harsh winters, but was sold on the area when the Senators played an exhibition against the Philadelphia Phillies shortly after the 1958 Major League Baseball All-Star Game. Years later, he offered another reason for moving to the state: "I’ll tell you why we came to Minnesota, it was when I found out you only had 15,000 blacks here. Black people don’t go to ball games, but they’ll fill up a rassling ring and put up such a chant it’ll scare you to death. It’s unbelievable. We came here because you’ve got good, hard-working, white people here.”

At the same time, Twin Cities-based owners won a franchise in the new Continental League, which served in part to turn the spotlight on Griffith's financial struggles in Washington. However, when he sought permission to move there for the 1959 season, the other American League owners turned him down again.

As the Senators' future was being debated off the field, the 1960 team enjoyed new on-field success thanks to its young talent base. Although it was still a below-.500 outfit (at 73–81), the Senators rose from eighth and last place to fifth in the league, and attendance exceeded 743,000. But when the 1960 season ended, Griffith was able to come to terms with Minnesota public officials. At the same time, the American League seemingly solved the potential antitrust issue (and helped to scuttle the Continental League) by voting to add two new teams for 1961, including an expansion team in Washington that would take on the Senators' name. This cleared the way for Griffith to move his franchise to Minnesota. The new Senators started at square one with players discarded from the eight original AL teams; the club lost 100 games in 1961, and had only one winning season (in 1969). In 1972, it moved to Dallas–Fort Worth as the Texas Rangers. Meanwhile, Griffith took his young talent, along with the heritage of the 1901–60 Senators, to the Twin Cities.

=== Minnesota (1961–1984) ===
==== 1961–1970: Contenders and a championship ====
Just five years after his uncle's death, Calvin Griffith moved the Senators to Minneapolis–Saint Paul in 1961. Well aware of the bitter century-long rivalry between Minneapolis and St. Paul, Griffith was determined not to offend fans on either side of the Mississippi River. Rather than name the team after either city, he made the then-unprecedented decision to name the team after its home state, christening it the Minnesota Twins.

At first the Twins took a step backward, winning only 70 of 160 games in 1961's new, longer American League schedule. But they drew 1.26 million fans to Metropolitan Stadium, 200,000 more than their most successful season in Washington. (Meanwhile, the Twins' second-largest shareholder, Washington businessman H. Gabriel Murphy, filed suit in federal court seeking to block the franchise shift; his legal battle with Griffith lasted for eight years.)

Despite the poor debut of the Twins on the field, Griffith's farm system continued to bear fruit. In 1962 rookie infielders Rich Rollins and Bernie Allen joined the maturing core of the team as the Twins vaulted into second place with 91 wins, only five games behind the New York Yankees. The 1963 edition also won 91 games, but fell further behind the Yankees, placing third, 13 games out, then the 1964 Twins slumped to a below-.500 season (79–83) and seventh place in the ten-team AL. But during both 1963 and 1964, Griffith continued to add young players to the Twins' lineup: center fielder Jimmie Hall, first baseman Mincher, and in 1964, AL rookie of the year and batting champion—and future Hall of Famer—Tony Oliva. Griffith also shrewdly acquired two starting pitchers, Jim Perry and Mudcat Grant, in separate transactions with the Cleveland Indians.

Griffith's efforts came together when the 1965 Twins broke the Yankees' stranglehold and won 102 games and the American League pennant. It was the franchise's first league title since 1933 (and was Calvin Griffith's only pennant-winner as owner). Versalles was the AL Most Valuable Player, Grant won 21 games and Oliva captured his second straight batting title. Griffith was named Major League Executive of the Year by The Sporting News. In the 1965 World Series, the Twins and the Los Angeles Dodgers split the first six games, with the home club winning every contest. But in Game 7 at Metropolitan Stadium, the Dodgers' Sandy Koufax shut out the Twins, 2–0, to deny Griffith a world championship. The 102 wins are still the most the franchise has ever won in either Washington or Minnesota.

The Twins won 89 or more games for four of the next five seasons. Only the injury-plagued 1968 Twins failed to contend or finish in the first division. In 1967, sparked by Griffith's off-season trade for 20-game-winner Dean Chance, 1965 acquisition César Tovar, and another brilliant rookie, Rod Carew, who became the team's starting second baseman at Griffith's insistence, the Twins narrowly missed the pennant by dropping the season's final two games to the eventual league champion Red Sox. They also drew 1.48 million fans to Metropolitan Stadium, the high-water mark for their first two decades in Minnesota. Perry, the versatile Tovar, who finished seventh in the AL MVP balloting for 1967 and played all nine positions in a single game on September 22, 1968, and Carew, a future Hall of Famer and seven-time AL batting champion, also figured heavily in the Twins' successful 1969 and 1970 editions. In 1969, the American League expanded to 12 teams and two divisions, and the Twins promptly won the first two American League West Division championships ever contested. But, on both occasions, the Twins fell to the AL East's Orioles, going winless in ALCS competition.

==== 1971–1984: Decline and rebuilding ====
With the exception of future Hall of Famer Bert Blyleven, who debuted as a teenager in 1970, the team's supply of elite minor league talent began to ebb during the 1970s. Oliva and Killebrew battled injuries and age, and the Twins sank back in the standings for the rest of the decade. The striking down of the reserve clause in 1976 meant the family-owned Twins had to compete with wealthier teams to keep their stars. Griffith was known for being a penny-pincher, as his uncle had been, and was either unable or unwilling to compete with owners who had access to more money. Some of the club's best young players, such as relief pitcher Bill Campbell and outfielder Lyman Bostock, departed as free agents. Blyleven, only 25, was traded to the Rangers for prospects and cash in June 1976 as he approached free agency. Then, in 1979, facing Carew's imminent free agency—and after the Lions Club debacle (below), when the Twins' owner's racist remarks enraged the star player—Griffith traded Carew to the California Angels for a package of prospects. Carew downplayed the significance of Griffith's remarks in later years, stating that he "saw no signs racism whatsoever" when he played for the Twins under Griffith and that he and Griffith did in fact agree that he should play for a bigger market team which had enough money to pay him what he was worth.

Additionally, Metropolitan Stadium, which had been the biggest factor in Griffith's move west, was already obsolete despite being just over 20 years old. However, there weren't enough revenue streams available to extend its useful life. There were only bleacher seats along the third base line, but the Twins couldn't afford to replace them with permanent seats. Talk of a new stadium began as early as 1970. Finally, the Metrodome opened in downtown Minneapolis in 1982. However, Griffith initially balked at signing a 30-year lease at the new stadium, instead opting for a provision that allowed the Twins to break the lease if average attendance fell below 1.4 million or the average attendance for the American League as a whole, whichever was lesser.

The last five full seasons of Griffith's ownership (1979–83) witnessed only two .500 or better teams, and attendance fell below one million fans at both Metropolitan Stadium and the Metrodome. Behind the scenes, however, the Twins' farm system was stepping up its development of young talent. Griffith's roster in 1984, the year during which he sold the Twins, included Hall of Famer Kirby Puckett, Kent Hrbek, Gary Gaetti, Tim Laudner and Frank Viola, all key members of the Twins' 1987 world championship team.

==== Sale to Pohlad ====
In 1973, as one of the Junior Circuit's longest-serving owners, Griffith was elected vice president of the American League, a post once held by his late uncle Clark; he served in the position into the 1980s. However, by the 1980s, the changes in baseball brought about by free agency proved too much for Griffith; by this time, he was the last MLB owner who had no income apart from his baseball team. In 1984, Griffith sold the Twins to Minneapolis banker Carl Pohlad on August 15. Calvin and Thelma's controlling 52 percent stake reportedly fetched $32 million, a handsome return on their uncle's purchase of a stake in the then-Senators in 1912 for $27,000 (he effectively acquired controlling interest in 1919). Pohlad then acquired Murphy's 40.4 percent interest through the Tampa Bay Baseball Group for a reported $11.5 million. The transaction ended almost 65 years of Griffith family ownership. He stayed on for a time as chairman of the board.

== Legacy ==
=== Quotable comments ===
Griffith became well known for his public statements. Wrote Sports Illustrated in 1983: "Griffith long ago established himself as one of sport's most accessible and quotable owners. Reporters could rap on his door, enter and fill their note pads with sentences so coarse in honesty and so magnificently mangled in syntax that some began to enjoy him. He was quoted last year as saying that rookie center fielder Jim Eisenreich was 'doomed to be an All-Star'."

"He'll either be the best manager in baseball—or the worst", he said when he gave a young Billy Martin his first manager job after the 1968 season. A year later, Griffith became the first owner to fire Martin, despite Martin's having led the Twins to 97 victories and the 1969 American League West Division title. The firing—which stemmed from Martin's well-publicized, alcohol-fueled assaults on 20-game-winning pitcher Dave Boswell and team executive Howard Fox—was highly unpopular with many Twins' fans. However, even before then, a number of Twins executives had received complaints about Martin's heavy drinking on road trips. When he was asked who would replace Martin as the Twins' 1970 manager, Griffith replied, "I guarantee you one thing. I won't do anything rational."

=== Allegations of racism ===
Griffith's off-the-cuff remarks landed him in more serious trouble in September 1978, and drew charges of racism. Speaking at a Lions Club dinner in Waseca, Minnesota, Griffith was unaware that Minneapolis Tribune staff writer Nick Coleman was attending the gathering. The meeting proceeded in a question and answer format. Griffith began to make comments about specific players and about race in general. Coleman is quoted as saying, "I was wincing the whole time thinking, you don't want to say that." At that point, Griffith interrupted himself, lowered his voice and asked if there were any blacks around. After he looked around the room and assured himself that his audience was white, Griffith resumed his answer stating:

"I'll tell you why we came to Minnesota. It was when we found out you only had 15,000 blacks here. Black people don't go to ballgames, but they'll fill up a rassling ring and put up such a chant it'll scare you to death. We came here because you've got good, hardworking white people here."

He went on to call Carew a "damn fool" for accepting a below-market $170,000 annual salary when he was actually worth "a lot more than that." Griffith denied charges of bigotry, but his Waseca remarks allegedly spurred Carew's trade before the 1979 season and "haunted Calvin for the rest of his life."

Upon hearing the comments for the first time before a game, Carew stated: "I will not ever sign another contract with this organization. I don't care how much money or how many options Calvin Griffith offers me. I definitely will not be back next year. I will not come back and play for a bigot," further stating, "He respects nobody and expects nobody to respect him. Spit on Calvin Griffith." Carew's anger seemed to lessen by 1991 when he was inducted into the Baseball Hall of Fame and called Griffith to thank him for jump-starting his career. Carew claimed that Griffith was "the first person" he called after being inducted.

In June 2020, Carew issued a response to the removal of Griffith's statue that acknowledged that the controversial comments Griffith made were “irresponsible, wrong and hurtful.” However, Carew also downplayed the public remarks he made in 1978 regarding his departure from the Twins, and stated that a basis for his trade to the Angels was that both he and Griffith agreed that he should play a team which could pay him better, stating, "When he traded me prior to the 1979 season, Calvin told me he wanted me to be paid what I was worth. Later that year the Angels made me the highest paid player in baseball. A racist wouldn't have done that." Carew went on to say he had forgiven Griffith for his mistake and did not believe that he was a racist, noting he believed Griffith's "thoughts on race evolved over time". While Carew always supported the statue of Griffith, he stated that he understood and respected the Twins' decision to remove it.

== Death ==
Griffith died in Melbourne, Florida, on October 20, 1999, at the age of 87 from complications related to pneumonia, a kidney infection and a high fever. He was buried in Washington, D.C., a city he rarely visited after moving the Senators to Minnesota.

Griffith was inducted into the Canadian Baseball Hall of Fame in 2010.

Preceded by Clark Griffith; 1920–1955	Owner of the Washington Senators (I)/Minnesota Twins; 1955–1984	Succeeded by Carl Pohlad; 1984–2009
