= Eloise O'Rourke Pohlad =

American philanthropist (1917–2003)

- Born: Mary Eloise O'Rourke; January 26, 1917; Dubuque, Iowa, U.S.
- Died: November 20, 2003 (aged 86); Minnesota, U.S.
- Resting place: Lakewood Cemetery
- Education: Mundelein College
- Known for: Carl and Eloise Pohlad Family Foundation
- Spouse: Carl Pohlad (m. 1947)
- Children: 3, including Jim and Bill

Eloise O'Rourke Pohlad (January 26, 1917 – November 20, 2003) was an American benefactor of many charities in the Twin Cities area of Minnesota.

== Early life ==
Eloise O'Rourke was born on January 26, 1917, in Dubuque, Iowa, the youngest of 10 children.

== Education and career ==
Eloise attended Catholic schools for her primary and secondary education. She pursued higher education in Chicago at Mundelein College (a private, Roman Catholic, women's college later purchased by Loyola University Chicago) where she studied home economics for two years.

After college, she worked as a teller, receptionist, and bookkeeper for the American Trust and Savings Bank in Dubuque.

== Personal life ==
Mary Eloise O'Rourke met Carl Pohlad on a blind date at a football game between University of Iowa and University of Minnesota. They married on April 22, 1947, at St. Joseph's Catholic Church in Key West, Iowa. They had three sons during their 56-year marriage: James ("Jim" Pohlad, an American baseball executive), Robert (Bob), and William ("Bill" Pohlad, a film producer and director).

== Philanthropic work ==
Eloise and her husband established the Carl and Eloise Pohlad Family Foundation in 1994. The foundation has given more than $100 million to community charities; their present focus is funding racial justice and housing stability efforts. The organization was renamed the Pohlad Family Foundation in 2017.

Eloise is also noted as one of the founders of the Minnesota Twins Community Fund, established after the team won the 1991 World Series. The foundation was created with the mission of providing opportunities for recreation and education in the Upper Midwest for young people.

== Death ==
Eloise died at her home on November 20, 2003. She was buried in Lakewood Cemetery.
