= Jim Pohlad =

American baseball executive

James Pohlad
- Born: March 10, 1953 (age 72)
- Occupation: Businessman
- Known for: Chairman and part-owner of the Minnesota Twins
- Title: Chairman of the Minnesota Twins
- Term: 2009–2022
- Predecessor: Carl Pohlad
- Successor: Joe Pohlad
- Parents: Carl Pohlad (father); Eloise O'Rourke Pohlad (mother)

James Pohlad (born March 10, 1953) is an American businessman who is the chairman and part-owner of the Minnesota Twins in Major League Baseball (MLB). He is the son of Eloise O'Rourke Pohlad and businessman Carl Pohlad, who made the family's fortune and originally purchased the Minnesota Twins in the 1980s.

While ownership of the Twins is collectively vested in the Pohlad family, Jim is operating head of the franchise.

== Chairman and part-owner of the Minnesota Twins ==
Since Carl's death on January 5, 2009, Jim and his two brothers, Bill (a film director and producer) and Bob, inherited the Twins franchise; all three are on the team's executive board. The Twins front-office directory lists the Pohlad family as a whole as the owner of the team, but Jim is the ownership group's public face, handling day-to-day operations and representing the Twins at owners meetings. This structure is roughly analogous to that of the NFL's Kansas City Chiefs since the death of founding owner Lamar Hunt in 2006; ownership is vested collectively in his family, but eldest son Clark is CEO and operating head of the franchise.

On November 29, 2022, Pohlad transitioned control of the Twins to his nephew, Joe Pohlad.

== See also ==
- List of Minnesota Twins owners and executives
