= Joe Cronin =

American baseball player and manager (1906–1984)

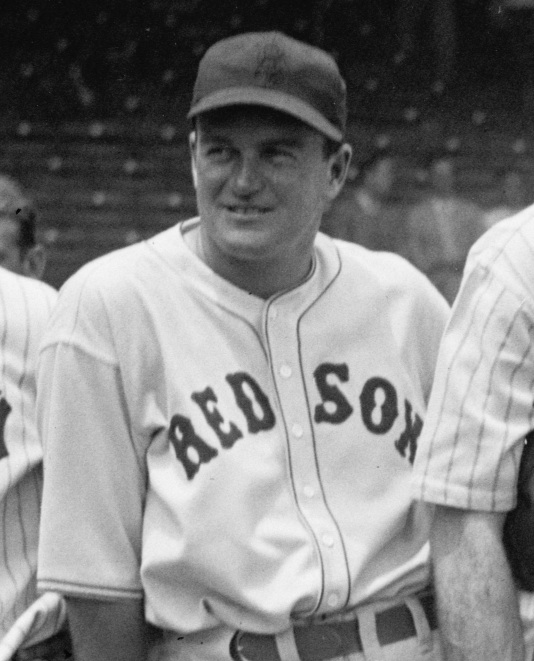
- Cronin with the Boston Red Sox in 1937
- Shortstop / Manager
- Born: October 12, 1906; San Francisco, California, U.S.
- Died: September 7, 1984 (aged 77); Osterville, Massachusetts, U.S.
- Batted: Right Threw: Right

MLB debut
- April 29, 1926, for the Pittsburgh Pirates

Last MLB appearance
- April 19, 1945, for the Boston Red Sox

MLB statistics
- Batting average: .301
- Hits: 2,285
- Home runs: 170
- Runs batted in: 1,424
- Managerial record: 1,236–1,055
- Winning %: .540
- Stats at Baseball Reference
- Managerial record at Baseball Reference

Teams
- As player: Pittsburgh Pirates (1926–1927); Washington Senators (1928–1934); Boston Red Sox (1935–1945); As manager: Washington Senators (1933–1934); Boston Red Sox (1935–1947)

Career highlights and awards
- 7× All-Star (1933–1935, 1937–1939, 1941); Boston Red Sox No. 4 retired; Boston Red Sox Hall of Fame; Washington Nationals Ring of Honor

Member of the National

Baseball Hall of Fame
- Induction: 1956
- Vote: 78.8% (tenth ballot)

Joseph Edward Cronin (October 12, 1906 – September 7, 1984) was an American professional baseball player, manager and executive. He played in Major League Baseball (MLB) as a shortstop, most notably as a member of the Boston Red Sox. Cronin spent over 48 years in baseball, culminating with 14 years as president of the American League (AL).

During his 20-year playing career (1926–1945), Cronin played for the Pittsburgh Pirates, Washington Senators and the Boston Red Sox; he was a player-manager for 13 seasons (1933–1945), and served as manager for two additional seasons (1946–1947). A seven-time All-Star, Cronin became the first American League player to become an All-Star with two teams; he was elected to the Baseball Hall of Fame in 1956.

== Early life ==
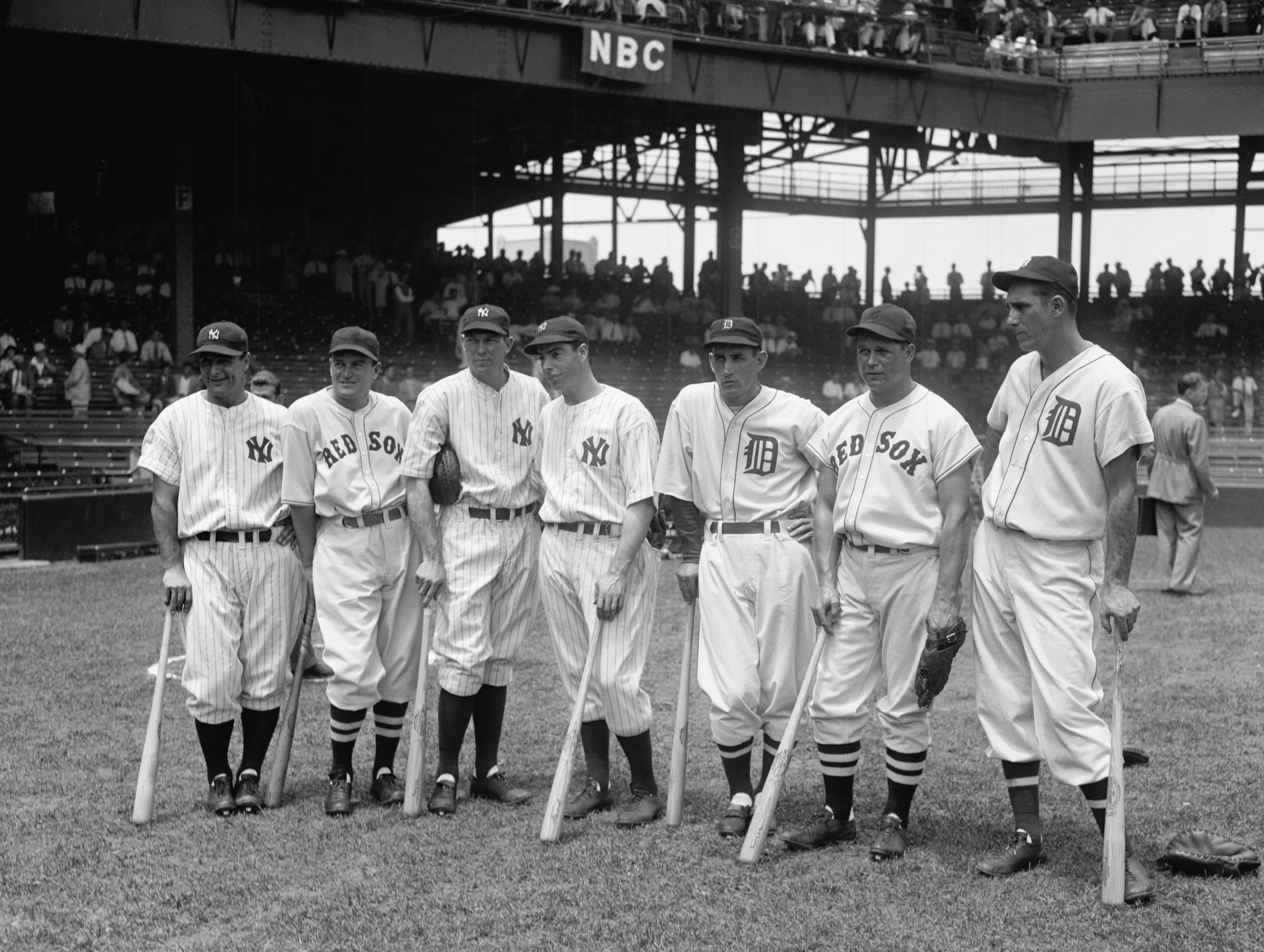
Seven of the American League's 1937 All-Star players, from left to right Lou Gehrig, Joe Cronin, Bill Dickey, Joe DiMaggio, Charlie Gehringer, Jimmie Foxx, and Hank Greenberg. All seven would be elected to the Hall of Fame.

Cronin was born in the Excelsior District of San Francisco, California. His parents lost almost all of their possessions in the 1906 San Francisco earthquake. Cronin attended Sacred Heart High School. He played several sports as a child and he won a city tennis championship for his age group when he was 14. As he was not greatly interested in school, Cronin's grades improved only when the San Francisco Seals of the Pacific Coast League began giving away tickets to students with good conduct and attendance. At the time, the nearest MLB team was nearly 2,000 miles (3,200 km) from San Francisco.

== Major league career ==
=== As a player ===
Cronin began his major league baseball career playing for the Pittsburgh Pirates in 1926 and 1927.

Baseball promoter Joe Engel, who scouted for the Washington Senators and managed the Chattanooga Lookouts at Engel Stadium, signed Cronin to the Senators in 1928, after spotting Cronin play in Kansas City.

In 1930, Cronin ranked 26th in the league for batting average at .346, 35th for home runs with 13, and 13th for RBI with 126. Cronin won both the AL Writers' MVP (the forerunner of the BBWAA MVP, established in 1931) and the AL Sporting News MVP. In his 1931 season, he posted a .306 average, 12 home runs, and 126 RBIs. Cronin led the Senators to the 1933 World Series and later married Mildred Robertson, the niece of Senators' owner Clark Griffith.

=== As a player-manager and manager ===
Cronin was named player-manager of the Senators in 1933, a post he would hold for two years. In his first year, he led the Senators to what would be their last pennant in Washington.

While Cronin was on his honeymoon with Mildred in his hometown of San Francisco, he received a telegram from Griffith informing him that the Boston Red Sox had offered the Senators their starting shortstop, Lyn Lary, in return for Cronin and $250,000. Red Sox owner Tom Yawkey also offered Cronin a five-year contract as player-manager. Well aware of the Senators' perennial financial problems (Griffith had no income apart from the Senators), Cronin accepted the trade. Cronin remained as player-manager of the Red Sox until 1945, then continued solely as manager until 1947.

As early as 1938, it was apparent to the Red Sox that Cronin's playing career was nearly over. Red Sox farm system director Billy Evans thought he had found Cronin's successor in Pee Wee Reese, the star shortstop for the Louisville Colonels of the Triple-A American Association. He was so impressed by Reese that he was able to convince Yawkey to buy the Colonels and make them the Red Sox' top farm club. However, when Yawkey and Evans asked Cronin to scout Reese, Cronin realized he was scouting his potential replacement. Believing he still had enough left to be a regular player, Cronin deliberately downplayed Reese's talent and suggested the Red Sox trade him. Reese was eventually traded to the Brooklyn Dodgers, where he had a Hall of Fame career. As it turned out, Evans and Yawkey's concerns about Cronin were valid. His last year as a full-time player was 1941; after that season he never played more than 76 games per season.

Even when World War II saw many young players either enlist or drafted in the armed services, Cronin limited his playing appearances to cameo roles as a utility infielder and pinch-hitter. On June 17, 1943, Cronin sent himself to pinch hit in both games of a doubleheader and hit a home run each time.

In April 1945, he broke his leg in a game against the Yankees. He sat out the remainder of the season and retired as a player at the end of the year.

Over his career, Cronin batted .300 or higher eight times, as well as driving in 100 runs or more eight times. He retired with a career .301 average, with 2,285 hits, 515 doubles, 118 triples, 170 home runs, and 1,424 RBIs.

As a manager, he compiled a 1,236–1,055 record and won two American League pennants (in 1933 and 1946). His 1933 Senators lost the 1933 World Series to the New York Giants, and his 1946 Red Sox–the franchise's first pennant winner in 28 years–lost the 1946 World Series to the St. Louis Cardinals.

=== As a general manager ===
At the end of the 1947 season, Cronin succeeded Eddie Collins as general manager of the Red Sox and held the post for over 11 years, through mid-January 1959. With Cronin as general manager, the Red Sox competed for the AL pennant in 1948 and 1949, finishing second by a single game each season, thanks to Cronin's aggressive trades.

In his first off-season, he acquired shortstop Vern Stephens and pitchers Ellis Kinder and Jack Kramer from the St. Louis Browns; all played major roles for the 1948 Red Sox, who finished the season tied for first place with the Cleveland Indians but lost a tie-breaking playoff game against the Indians for the AL pennant. Kinder and Stephens were centerpieces of the Red Sox' 1949–1950 contenders as well. In the former year, they were edged out by the Yankees during the regular season's final weekend; in the latter, they finished third but came within four games of the league-leading Yanks.

With the exception of Ted Williams (who missed most of the 1952–1953 seasons while serving in the Korean War), the core of the 1946–1950 team aged quickly and the Red Sox faced a significant rebuilding job starting in 1952. Cronin's acquisition of future American League Most Valuable Player Jackie Jensen from Washington in 1954 represented a coup, but the club misfired on several "bonus babies" who never lived up to their potential. The Red Sox posted winning season records for all but two of Cronin's 11 seasons as general manager, but from 1951 through 1958 they lagged behind the AL pennant-winners (except for 1954, the Yankees) by an average of almost 18 games. In January of 1959, Cronin left the team and became American League president.

By the end of Cronin's eleven-year term as general manager, the Red Sox were the only major-league team that had not fielded a black player. During this time, he reportedly made unsuccessful efforts to integrate the team, including attempts to sign or trade for Bill Greason, Larry Doby and Charlie Neal. At the minor-league level, Cronin made some attempts to sign black players. Notably, in 1949, he sent scout Larry Woodall to evaluate an 18-year-old Willie Mays of the Birmingham Black Barons of the Negro American League. But Woodall and Cronin passed on Mays and instead signed Lorenzo "Piper" Davis, 32, who was Mays’ player-manager and a five-time All-star shortstop. Davis became the first black player to sign with the Red Sox organization in 1949, but he was released after one season, which included 15 games played with the 1950 Scranton Red Sox of the Eastern League.

During the 1950s, Cronin's farm system signed pitcher Earl Wilson in 1953 and purchased infielder Pumpsie Green in 1955. Wilson rose through the Red Sox' system until he was called to military service in the U.S. Marines for two years. Finally, in the middle of 1959, both were promoted from the Triple-A Minneapolis Millers by Cronin's successor, Bucky Harris: Green became the first African-American to play in a major league game for the Red Sox on July 21; one week later, Wilson became the second, and their first black pitcher.

=== As AL president ===
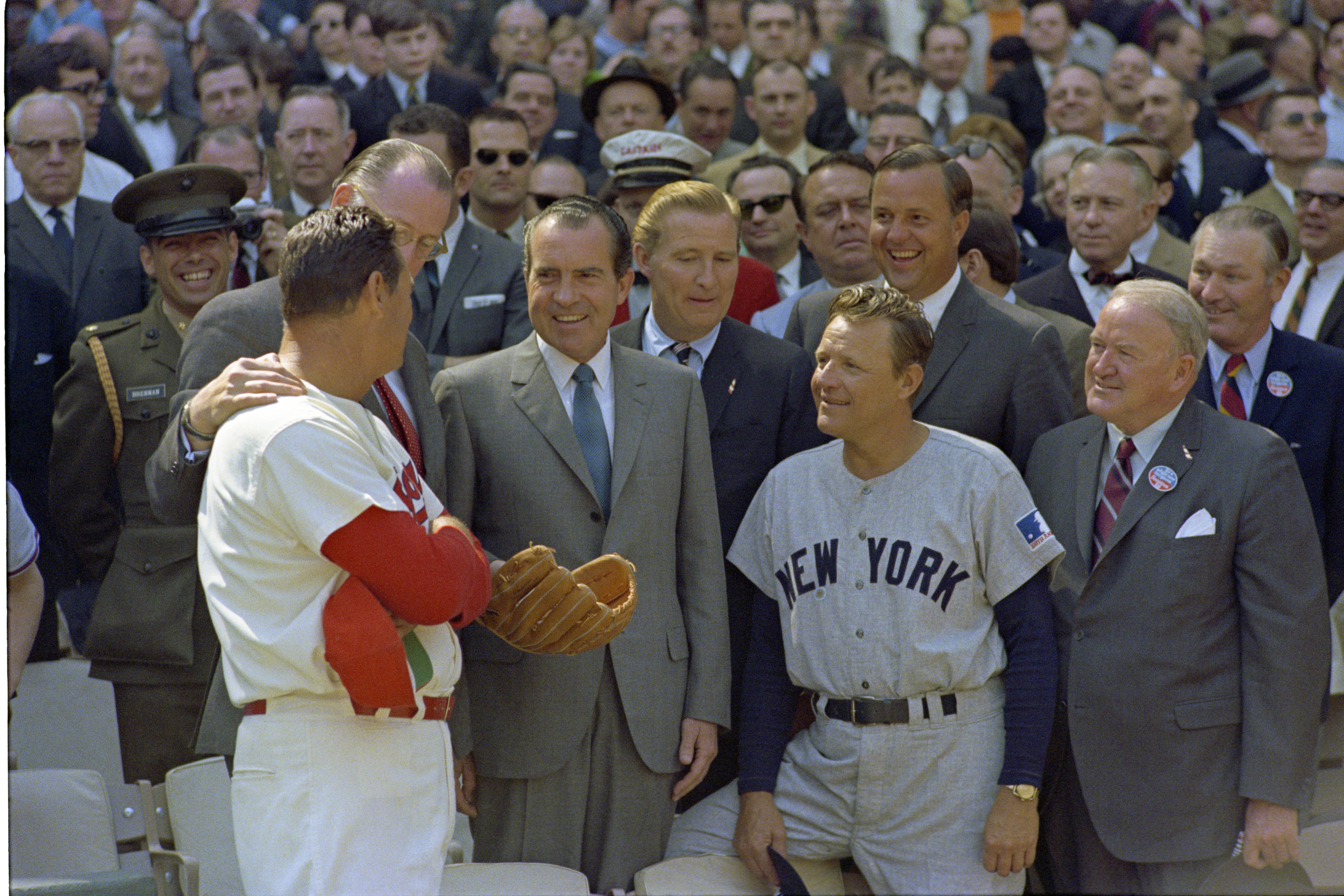
Joe Cronin (far right, with button on jacket) with Richard Nixon on April 7, 1969; managers Ted Williams, left, red sleeves, and Ralph Houk, right, flank Nixon

In January 1959, Cronin was elected president of the American League, the first former player to be so elected and the fourth full-time chief executive in the league's history. When he replaced the retiring Will Harridge, who became board chairman, Cronin moved the league's headquarters from Chicago to Boston. Cronin served as AL president until December 31, 1973, when he was succeeded by Lee MacPhail.

During Cronin's 15 years in office, the Junior Circuit expanded from eight to 12 teams, adding the Los Angeles Angels and expansion Washington Senators in 1961 and the Kansas City Royals and Seattle Pilots in 1969.

The league also underwent four franchise shifts: the relocation of the original Senators club (now owned by Cronin's brother-in-law and sister-in-law, Calvin Griffith and Thelma Griffith Haynes) to Minneapolis–Saint Paul, creating the Minnesota Twins (1961); the shift of the Athletics from Kansas City to Oakland (1968); the transfer of the Pilots after only one season in Seattle to Milwaukee as the Brewers (1970); and the transplantation of the expansion Senators after 11 seasons in Washington, D.C., to Dallas–Fort Worth as the Texas Rangers (1972). The Angels also moved from Los Angeles to adjacent Orange County in 1966 and adopted a regional identity, in part because of the dominance of the National League Dodgers, who were the Angels' landlords at "Chavez Ravine" (Dodger Stadium) from 1962–1965. Of the four expansion teams that joined the league beginning in 1961, three abandoned their original host cities within a dozen years (the Pilots after only one season), and only one team—the Royals—remained in its original municipality. Two of the charter members of the old eight-team league, the Chicago White Sox and Cleveland Indians, also suffered significant attendance woes and were targets of relocation efforts by other cities.

In addition, the AL found itself at a competitive disadvantage compared with the National League during Cronin's term. With strong teams in larger markets and a host of new stadiums, the NL outdrew the AL for 33 consecutive years (1956–1988). In 1973, Cronin's final season as league president, the NL attracted 55 percent of total MLB attendance, 16.62 million vs. 13.38 million total fans, despite the opening of Royals Stadium in Kansas City and the American League's adoption of the designated hitter rule, which was designed to spark scoring and fan interest. While the National League held only an 8–7 edge in World Series play during the Cronin era, it dominated the Major League Baseball All-Star Game, going 15–3–1 in the 19 games played from 1959 to 1973.

In 1966, while American League president, Cronin hired the first black major league umpire, Emmett Ashford. In an interview with Larry Gerlach, Ashford stated, “Jackie Robinson had his Branch Rickey, I had my Joe Cronin.”

After the 1968 season, Cronin drew headlines when he fired AL umpires Al Salerno and Bill Valentine, ostensibly for poor performance; however, it later surfaced that the two officials were fired for attempting to organize an umpires' union. Neither man was reinstated (Valentine became a successful minor league front-office executive), but the Major League Umpires Association was formed anyway, two years later.

Joe Cronin's number 4 was retired by the Boston Red Sox in 1984.

=== Hall of Fame ===
Joe Cronin was inducted into the Baseball Hall of Fame (with Hank Greenberg) in 1956.

== Career statistics ==
G	AB	R	H	2B	3B	HR	RBI	BB	AVG	OBP	SLG	FLD%
2,124	7,579	1,233	2,285	515	118	170	1,424	1,059	.301	.390	.468	.953

== Managerial record ==
Team	Year	Regular season					Postseason			
Team	Year	Games	Won	Lost	Win %	Finish	Won	Lost	Win %	Result
WAS	1933	152	99	53	.651	1st in AL	1	4	.200	Lost World Series (NYG)
WAS	1934	152	66	86	.434	7th in AL	–	–	–	–
WAS total		304	165	139	.543		1	4	.200	
BOS	1935	153	78	75	.510	4th in AL	–	–	–	–
BOS	1936	154	74	80	.481	6th in AL	–	–	–	–
BOS	1937	152	80	72	.526	5th in AL	–	–	–	–
BOS	1938	149	88	61	.591	2nd in AL	–	–	–	–
BOS	1939	151	89	62	.589	2nd in AL	–	–	–	–
BOS	1940	154	82	72	.532	5th in AL	–	–	–	–
BOS	1941	154	84	70	.545	2nd in AL	–	–	–	–
BOS	1942	152	93	59	.612	2nd in AL	–	–	–	–
BOS	1943	152	68	84	.447	7th in AL	–	–	–	–
BOS	1944	154	77	77	.500	4th in AL	–	–	–	–
BOS	1945	154	71	83	.461	7th in AL	–	–	–	–
BOS	1946	154	104	50	.675	1st in AL	3	4	.429	Lost World Series (STL)
BOS	1947	154	83	71	.539	3rd in AL	–	–	–	–
BOS total		1987	1071	916	.539		3	4	.429	
Total		2291	1236	1055	.540		4	8	.333	

== Death ==
In the last months of his life, Cronin struggled with cancer that had invaded his prostate and bones; he suffered a great deal of bone pain as a result. Cronin came to Fenway Park for one of his last public appearances when his jersey number 4 was retired by the Red Sox on May 29, 1984. He died at the age of 77 on September 7, 1984, at his home in Osterville, Massachusetts. He is buried in St. Francis Xavier Cemetery in nearby Centerville.

== Legacy ==
At the number retirement ceremony shortly before Cronin's death, teammate Ted Williams commented on how much he respected Cronin as a father and a man. Cronin was also remembered as a clutch hitter. Manager Connie Mack once commented, "With a man on third and one out, I'd rather have Cronin hitting for me than anybody I've ever seen, and that includes Cobb, Simmons and the rest of them."

In 1999, he was a nominee for the Major League Baseball All-Century Team.

The Joe Cronin Award was established in 1973 to reward American League players for significant achievement.

== See also ==
- Boston Red Sox Hall of Fame
- Bay Area Sports Hall of Fame
- List of Major League Baseball career hits leaders
- List of Major League Baseball career doubles leaders
- List of Major League Baseball career triples leaders
- List of Major League Baseball career runs scored leaders
- List of Major League Baseball career runs batted in leaders
- List of Major League Baseball annual doubles leaders
- List of Major League Baseball annual triples leaders
- List of Major League Baseball players to hit for the cycle
- List of Major League Baseball player-managers
- List of Major League Baseball managerial wins and winning percentage leaders

== Notes ==
Achievements
Preceded by Ski Melillo; Buddy Rosar	Hitting for the cycle September 2, 1929; August 2, 1940	Succeeded by Freddie Lindstrom; Joe Gordon
