= National Bank Act =

Primary federal legislation in the US

National Bank Act of 1863
- Long title: An Act to provide a national currency, secured by a pledge of United States stocks, and to provide for the circulation and redemption thereof.
- Enacted by: the 37th United States Congress
- Effective: February 25, 1863

Citations
- Statutes at Large: 12 Stat. 665, Chap. 58

Legislative history
- Introduced in the Senate as S. 486 by John Sherman (R–OH) on January 26, 1863; Passed the Senate on February 12, 1863 (23–21); Passed the House on February 20, 1863 (78-64); Signed into law by President Abraham Lincoln on February 25, 1863

National Bank Act of 1864
- Long title: An Act to provide a national currency, secured by a pledge of United States bonds, and to provide for the circulation and redemption thereof.
- Enacted by: the 38th United States Congress
- Effective: June 3, 1864

Citations
- Statutes at Large: 13 Stat. 99, Chap. 106

Legislative history
- Introduced in the House as H.R. 395 by Samuel Hooper (R–MA) on April 11, 1864; Passed the House on April 18, 1864 (80-66); Passed the Senate on May 10, 1864 (30–9); Agreed to by the House on May 24, 1864 (66–52); Signed into law by President Abraham Lincoln on June 3, 1864

The National Banking Acts of 1863 and 1864 were two United States federal banking acts that established a system of national banks chartered at the federal level, and created the United States National Banking System. They encouraged development of a national fiat currency backed by bank holdings of U.S. Treasury securities and established the Office of the Comptroller of the Currency as part of the United States Department of the Treasury. The acts shaped today's national banking system and its support of a uniform U.S. banking policy.

== Background ==
=== Antebellum Period ===
At the end of the Second Bank of the United States in 1836, the control of banking regimes devolved mostly to the states. Different states adopted policies including a total ban on banking (as in Wisconsin), a single state-chartered bank (as in Indiana and Illinois), limited chartering of banks (as in Ohio), and free entry (as in New York). While the relative success of New York's "free banking" laws led several states also to adopt a free-entry banking regime, the system remained poorly integrated across state lines. Though all banknotes were uniformly denominated in dollars, notes would often circulate at a steep discount in states beyond their issue.

In the end, well-publicized frauds arose in states like Michigan, which had adopted free entry regimes but did not require the redeemability of bank issues for specie. The perception of dangerous "wildcat banking”, along with the poor integration of the U.S. banking system, led to increasing public support for a uniform national banking regime.

The United States government, on the other hand, still had limited taxation capabilities and so had an interest in the seigniorage potential of a national bank. In 1846, the Polk Administration created a United States Treasury system that moved public funds from private banks to Treasury branches to fund the Mexican–American War. However, the revenue generated this way was limited without a national currency.

=== Civil War ===
This became more urgent during the Civil War, when Congress and Lincoln were struggling to finance the war efforts. Without a national mechanism for issuing currency other than metal coinage, the Lincoln administration could not exploit the powers and loopholes that, for example, Britain could with its central bank, in order to finance the high expenses involved. Previously, the damage that would be done to state banks by national competition was sufficient to prevent significant national bank chartering. But using the war crisis, Lincoln was able to expand this effort.

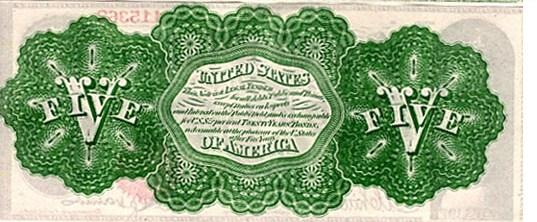
A "greenback" note issued during the Civil War

One of the first attempts to issue a national currency came in the early days of the Civil War when Congress approved the Legal Tender Act of 1862, allowing the issue of $150 million in national notes known as greenbacks and mandating that paper money be issued and accepted in lieu of gold and silver coins. The bills were fiat money backed only by the national government's promise to redeem them and their value was dependent on public confidence in the government as well as the ability of the government to give out specie in exchange for the bills in the future. Many thought this promise backing the bills was about as good as the green ink printed on one side, hence the name "greenbacks."

The Second Legal Tender Act, enacted July 11, 1862, a Joint Resolution of Congress, and the Third Legal Tender Act, enacted March 3, 1863, expanded the limit to $450 million. The largest amount of greenbacks outstanding at any one time was calculated as $447,300,203.10.

The National Bank Act (ch. 58, 12 Stat. 665; February 25, 1863), originally known as the National Currency Act, was passed in the Senate by a 23–21 vote, and was supplemented a year later by the National Banking Act of 1864. The goals of these acts was to create a single national currency, a nationalized bank chartering system, and to raise money for the Union war effort. The Act established national banks that could issue National Bank Notes which were backed by the United States Treasury and printed by the government itself. The quantity of notes that a bank was allowed to issue was proportional to the bank's level of capital deposited with the Comptroller of the Currency at the Treasury. To further control the currency, the Act taxed notes issued by state and local banks, essentially pushing non-federally issued paper currency out of circulation.

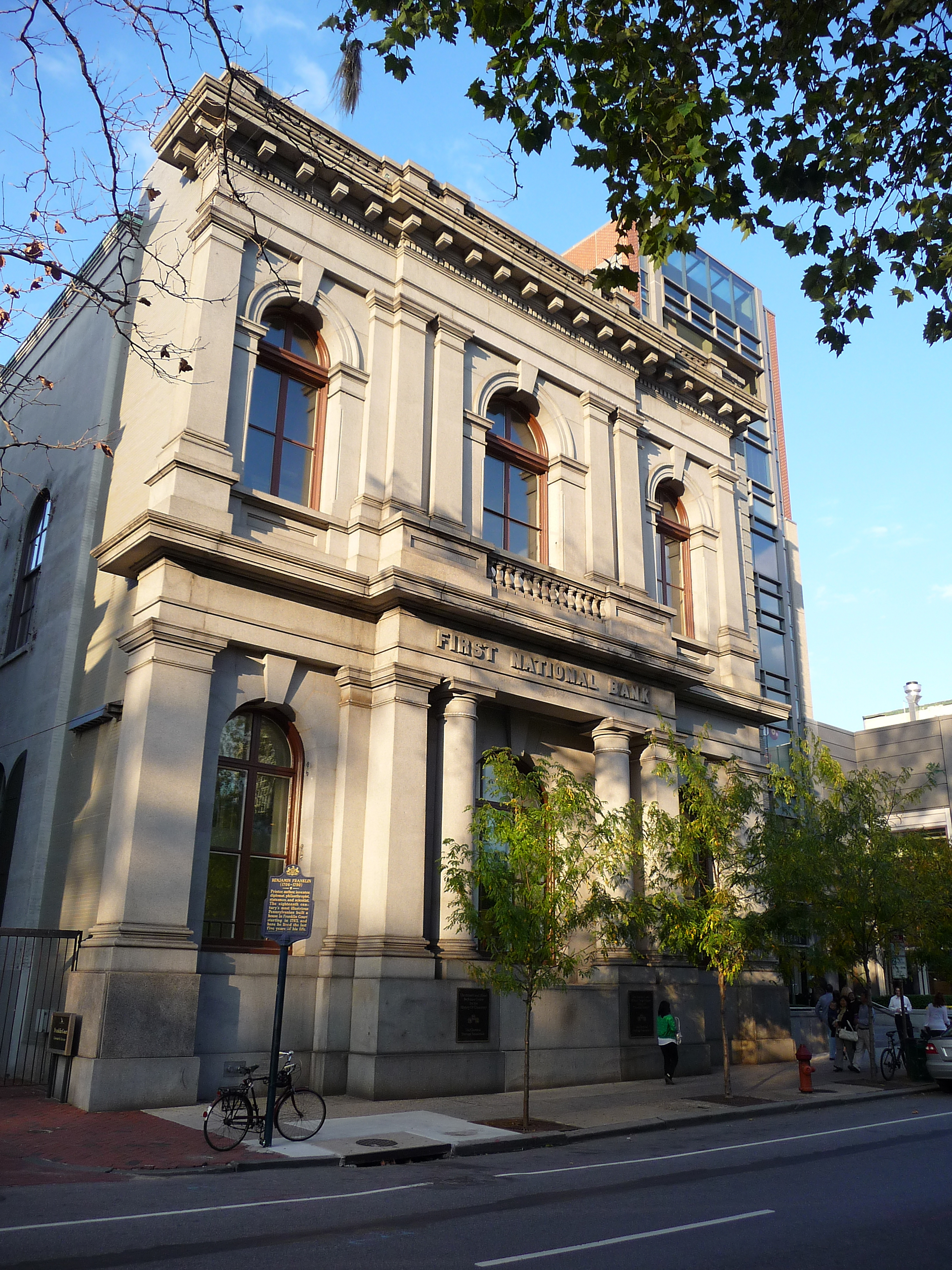
The First National Bank in Philadelphia

Since the establishment of the Republic, state governments had held authority to regulate banks. Before the act, state legislatures typically issued bank charters on a case-by-case basis, taking into consideration whether the area needed a new bank, and if the applicant was of good moral standing. As this system could be subject to corruption, states began passing "free banking" laws in 1837, which meant that any applicant who filled out the correct paperwork and deposited an in-kind payment to the state would be granted a charter. By the 1860s, over half of states had such a law on the books. However, the National Banking Act of 1864 (ch. 106, 13 Stat. 99; June 3, 1864) brought a close to the issue by establishing federally-issued bank charters, which took banking out of the hands of state governments. The first bank to receive a national charter was the First National Bank of Philadelphia, Pennsylvania (Charter #1). The first new national bank to open was The First National Bank of Davenport, Iowa (Charter #15). Additionally, more than 1,500 state banks converted themselves to national banks.

== National Bank Acts ==
=== National Bank Act of 1863 ===
The National Bank Act of 1863, also known as the National Currency Act of 1863, was passed on February 25, 1863, and was the first attempt to establish a federal banking system after the failures of the First and Second Banks of the United States, and served as the predecessor to the Federal Reserve Act of 1913. The act allowed the creation of national banks, set out a plan for establishing a national currency backed by government securities held by other banks, and gave the federal government the ability to sell war bonds and securities (in order to help the war effort). National banks were chartered by the federal government, and were subject to stricter regulation, particularly the requirement that no less than 1/3 of the bank's capital had to take the form of US Government bonds, which were held in the vault of the Office of the Comptroller of the Currency. A high tax on state banks was levied to discourage competition, and by 1865 most state banks had either received national charters or collapsed.

=== National Bank Act of 1864 ===
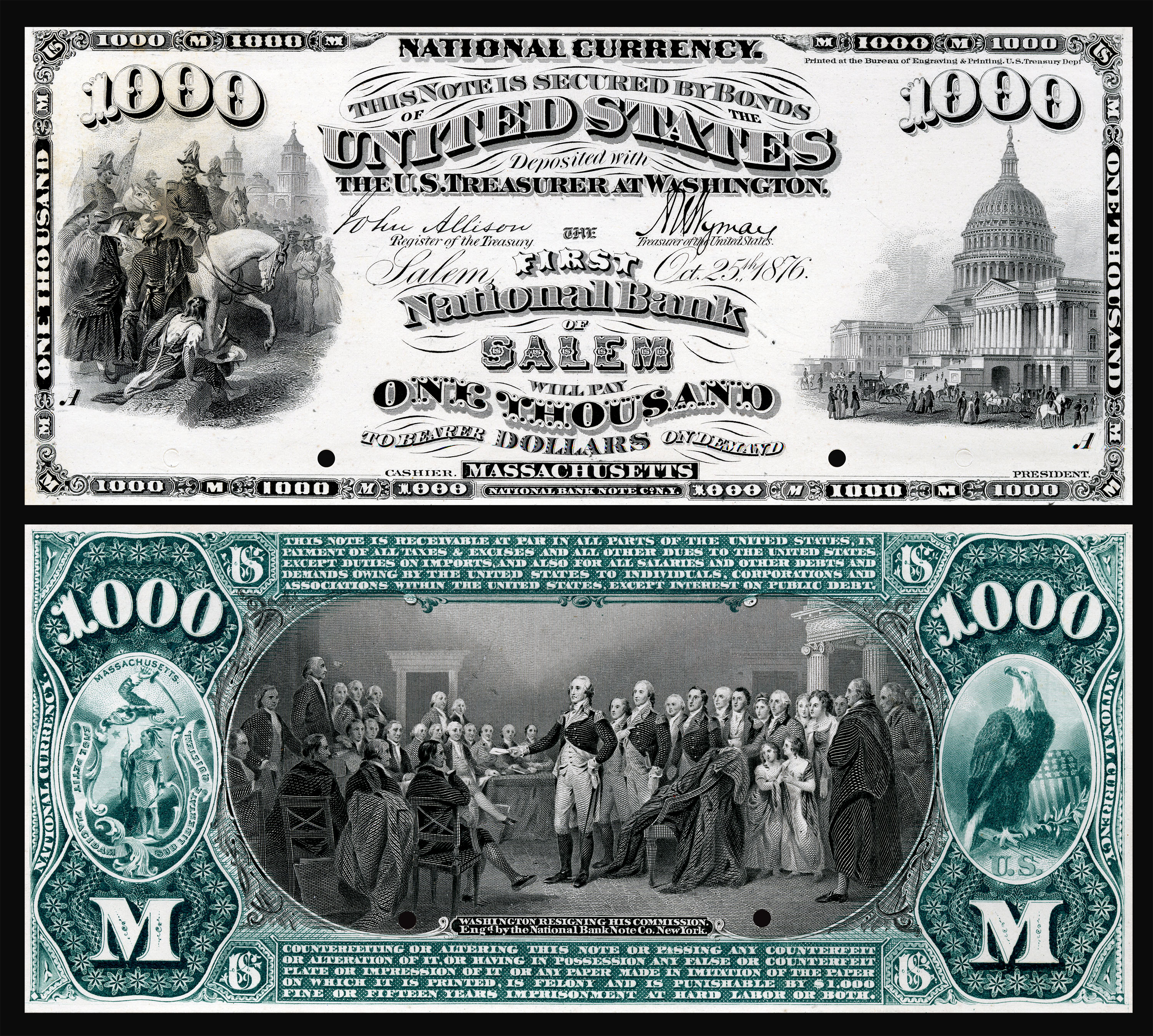
$1000 National Bank Note from 1875

The 1864 act, based on a New York State law, brought the federal government into active supervision of commercial banks.

=== National Bank Acts of 1865 and 1866 ===
Further acts passed in 1865 and 1866 imposed a tax to speed the adoption of the system. All banks (national or otherwise) had to pay a 10 percent tax on payments that they made in currency notes other than national bank notes. The tax rate was intentionally set so high as to effectively prohibit further circulation of state bank and private notes. By this time the conversion from state banks to national banks was well underway. The constitutionality of the tax came before the Supreme Court in Veazie Bank v. Fenno, a case by a state-chartered Maine bank and the collector of internal revenue. The Court ruled 7–2 in favor of the government. State banks declined until the 1870s, when the growing popularity of checks and the declining profitability of national bank currency issues caused a resurgence.

== Resurgence of state banks ==
The granting of charters led to the creation of many national banks and a national banking system which grew at a fast pace. The number of national banks rose from 66 immediately after the Act to 7,473 in 1913. Initially, this rise in national banking came at the expense of state banking—the number of state banks dwindled from 1,466 in 1863 to 247 in 1868. Though state banks were no longer allowed to issue notes, local bankers took advantage of less strict capital requirements ($10,000 for state banks vs. $50,000–200,000 for national banks) and opened new branches en masse. These new state banks then served as competition for national banks, growing to 15,526 in number by 1913.

Hugh McCulloch originally opposed the National Banking Act but it grew on him and he organized the Currency Bureau. Part of his plans to revamp this portion of the banking system included hiring a new staff, being hands-on with several aspects such as "personally evaluating applications for bank charters and consoled prospective bankers", and "assisting in the design of the new national bank notes, and arranged for their engraving, printing, and distribution." As a result of McCulloch's efforts, many banks were just not willing to conform to his system of operations. This prompted Congress to pass "a 10 percent tax on the notes of state banks, signaling its determination that national banks would triumph and the state banks would fade away".

A later act, passed on March 3, 1865, imposed a tax of 10 percent on the notes of state banks to take effect on July 1, 1866. Similar to previous taxes, this effectively forced all non-federal currency from circulation. It also resulted in the creation of demand deposit accounts, and encouraged banks to join the national system, increasing the number of national banks substantially.

== Legacy ==
The National Banking Acts served to create the (federal-state) dual structure that is now a defining characteristic of the U.S. banking system and economy. The Comptroller of the Currency continues to have significance in the U.S. economy and is responsible for administration and supervision of national banks as well as certain activities of bank subsidiaries (per the Gramm-Leach-Bliley Act of 1999). In 2004, the Act was used by John D. Hawke, Jr., Comptroller of the Currency, to effectively bar state attorneys general from national bank oversight and regulatory roles. Many blame the resulting lack of oversight and regulation for the late-2000s recession, the bailout of the U.S. financial system and the subprime mortgage crisis.

== See also ==
- Cuomo v. Clearing House Ass'n, L.L.C.
- Marquette National Bank of Minneapolis v. First of Omaha Service Corp.
