= Bill Pohlad =

American film producer and director

- Occupations: Film producer, film director
- Years active: 1990–present
- Known for: River Road Entertainment
- Notable work: Love & Mercy (2014)

Bill Pohlad is an American film producer and director. He is the son of Mary Eloise (O'Rourke) and billionaire financier Carl Pohlad, who owned the Minnesota Twins baseball franchise from 1984 until his death in 2009. He has two brothers: Jim Pohlad, who took over as the team's principal owner upon their father's death; and Bob Pohlad, owner of NorthMarq Capital.

== Life and career ==
Pohlad was the executive producer of the movies Brokeback Mountain, A Prairie Home Companion, and Food, Inc., and a producer of Into the Wild and 12 Years a Slave. On January 24, 2012, he was nominated for an Academy Award (as producer) for the film The Tree of Life.

Almost 25 years after his directorial debut with Old Explorers (1990), Pohlad's biopic of Brian Wilson, Love & Mercy, was screened at the 2014 Toronto Film Festival. It stars Paul Dano as the younger Wilson and John Cusack as the older Wilson, along with Paul Giamatti as Dr. Eugene Landy and Elizabeth Banks as Wilson's second wife, Melinda Ledbetter. Shooting on the film wrapped on August 27, 2013. It was distributed internationally by Lions Gate Entertainment and in the United States by Roadside Attractions on June 5, 2015.

Pohlad is the President of the River Road Entertainment company, which he founded in 1987.

Pohlad supported Democratic candidate Hillary Clinton in the run-up for the 2016 U.S. presidential election.

== Filmography ==
=== Film ===
- Old Explorers (1990) – director, writer, producer
- Brokeback Mountain (2005) – executive producer
- Fur (2006) – producer
- Chicago 10 (2007) – executive producer
- Into the Wild (2007) – producer
- Food, Inc. (2008) – executive producer
- The Runaways (2010) – producer
- Fair Game (2010) – producer
- The Tree of Life (2011) – producer
- 12 Years a Slave (2013) – producer
- Wild (2014) – producer
- Love & Mercy (2014) – director, producer
- Time Out of Mind (2014) – producer
- A Monster Calls (2016) – executive producer
- American Utopia (2020) – executive producer
- Dreamin' Wild (2022) – director, writer, producer
- Unicorns (2023) – producer
- Miles & Juliette (TBA) – director, producer
