= Marquette Bank Minneapolis =

Defunct Minneapolis bank that was party to a US Supreme Court decision

- Formerly: Marquette National Bank (1920–1982)
- Type: Subsidiary
- Industry: Banking
- Founded: 1920; 106 years ago in Minneapolis, Minnesota as Marquette National Bank
- Defunct: December 31, 1992; 33 years ago
- Fate: Acquired by First Bank System
- Successor: First Bank System
- Headquarters: Minneapolis, Minnesota
- Number of locations: 22
- Area served: Minneapolis–Saint Paul
- Key people: Carl Pohlad
- Parent: Bank Shares, Inc.

Marquette Bank Minneapolis, formerly named the Marquette National Bank, was a bank in Minneapolis, Minnesota. It was party to Marquette National Bank of Minneapolis v. First of Omaha Service Corp., an important decision by the Supreme Court of the United States which regulated the banking industry.

== History ==
Originally named the Marquette National Bank, it was chartered in 1920 and was named for Marquette Avenue, the financial center of Minneapolis, Minnesota.

The bank was eventually acquired by Carl Pohlad and had $350 million in assets in 1982 when it acquired the failing Farmers and Mechanics Savings Bank of Minneapolis (F&M) and had nearly $1 billion of assets prior to sale which was arranged by the Federal Deposit Insurance Corporation. After the acquisition, the name was changed to Marquette Bank Minneapolis and it had the fourth most assets in the state. The bank was owned by the Bank Shares, Inc. holding company which was controlled by the Pohlad family and which owned several other banks in the Minneapolis area using the Marquette name.

Bank Shares announced the sale to First Bank System (now US Bank) in January 1992 with the deal finally closing in December 1992 for $200 million in stock.

== Interest rate battle ==
Marquette was involved in lengthy credit card interest rate litigation with the First National Bank of Omaha which resulted in an important US Supreme Court ruling regulating the banking industry. Marquette brought suit against First National, claiming the interest rate charged Minnesotan customers using First National credit card services (VISA), though legal in Nebraska, exceeded the interest rate allowed under Minnesota state law. Marquette was also issuing cards but did not exceed the interest rate permitted by the law in the cardholder's state. The court ruled in 1978 that a federally chartered bank like First National could offer credit card services nationwide and the maximum interest rate to cardholders was that allowed by the state the bank was located in and not the customer's state. This ruling prompted some US states (South Dakota, Delaware, Utah, Virginia, New Hampshire) to repeal their maximum interest rate laws. Banks offering credit card services quickly established offices and cardholder services in those States to take advantage of the "no cap" interest rates allowed by the state.
