= Joe Haynes (baseball) =

American baseball player (1917–1967)

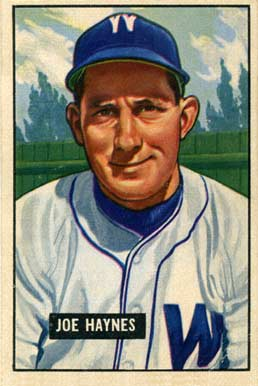
- Pitcher
- Born: September 21, 1917; Lincolnton, Georgia, U.S.
- Died: January 6, 1967 (aged 49); Hopkins, Minnesota, U.S.
- Batted: Right Threw: Right

MLB debut
- April 24, 1939, for the Washington Senators

Last MLB appearance
- August 30, 1952, for the Washington Senators

MLB statistics
- Win–loss record: 76–82
- Earned run average: 4.01
- Strikeouts: 475
- Stats at Baseball Reference

Teams
- Washington Senators (1939–1940); Chicago White Sox (1941–1948); Washington Senators (1949–1952)

Career highlights and awards
- All-Star (1948); AL ERA leader (1947)

Joseph Walton Haynes (September 21, 1917 – January 6, 1967) was an American professional baseball player, coach and front office executive. A right-handed pitcher, he logged 14 seasons in Major League Baseball as a member of the Washington Senators (1939–40; 1949–52) and Chicago White Sox (1941–48). He married Thelma Mae Robertson Griffith, niece of Washington owner Clark Griffith, in October 1941, ten months after he had been traded to Chicago by his fiancée's uncle.

== Pitching career ==
Born in Lincolnton, Georgia, Haynes stood 6 feet 2 inches (188 cm) tall and weighed 190 pounds (86 kg).

He began his pro career in 1937, and made his MLB debut on April 24, 1939, at Fenway Park. Coming into the game in the eighth inning with one out and Washington leading the Boston Red Sox 9–7, he allowed Boston to tie the score in the bottom of the ninth, but held the Red Sox off the scoreboard in the tenth after the Senators had forged ahead in the top of that frame. Haynes was credited with the 10–9 triumph in his first major-league appearance. After two years with Washington, however, Haynes sported a poor 11–18 record and 5.67 earned-run average. Senators owner Griffith sold Haynes' contract to the Chicago White Sox on January 4, 1941.

Of Haynes' 379 MLB appearances, 218 came with the White Sox, where he won 55 of 98 decisions (.561) and posted a 3.14 ERA. He was named to the 1948 American League All-Star team (although he did not appear in the game itself) and led the league in games pitched (40) and games finished (35) in 1942 and in earned run average (2.42) in 1947.

The White Sox traded Haynes after the 1948 season, sending him to the Cleveland Indians for catcher Joe Tipton on November 24. But, just three weeks later, on December 14, 1948, he returned to the Senators when the Indians dealt Haynes, pitcher Ed Klieman, and first baseman Eddie Robinson to Washington for first-sacker Mickey Vernon and future Hall-of-Fame hurler Early Wynn. During his second stint with the Senators Haynes went 10–21 with a 5.42 ERA in 112 games over four seasons. His MLB career ended at age 35 on October 7, 1952, when he was released.

In 379 big-league games pitched, including 147 games started, Haynes compiled a 76–82 win-loss record, 53 complete games, five shutouts, 159 games finished and 21 saves in 1,581 innings pitched. He allowed 1,672 hits, 823 runs, 704 earned runs, 95 home runs and 620 walks, with 475 strikeouts, 26 hit batsmen, 35 wild pitches, 6,890 batters faced, four balks and a 4.01 ERA.

Haynes had a career .213 batting average (111-for-521) with 48 runs, 1 home run and 39 RBI. Defensively he recorded a .966 fielding percentage.

== Coach and executive ==
As a member of the Griffith family whose wife inherited 26 percent of the franchise's stock in 1955, Haynes remained in the Washington organization after his playing career ended.

He served as the Senators' pitching coach from 1953 to 1955, coached in their farm system, then moved into the front office as executive vice president, working with his brother-in-law, club president Calvin Griffith, in Washington and after the team moved to Minneapolis–St. Paul as the Minnesota Twins in 1961. Haynes died in Hopkins, Minnesota, of a heart attack suffered while shoveling snow at the age of 49.

== See also ==
- List of Major League Baseball annual ERA leaders
