= Carl Pohlad =

American financier (1915–2009)

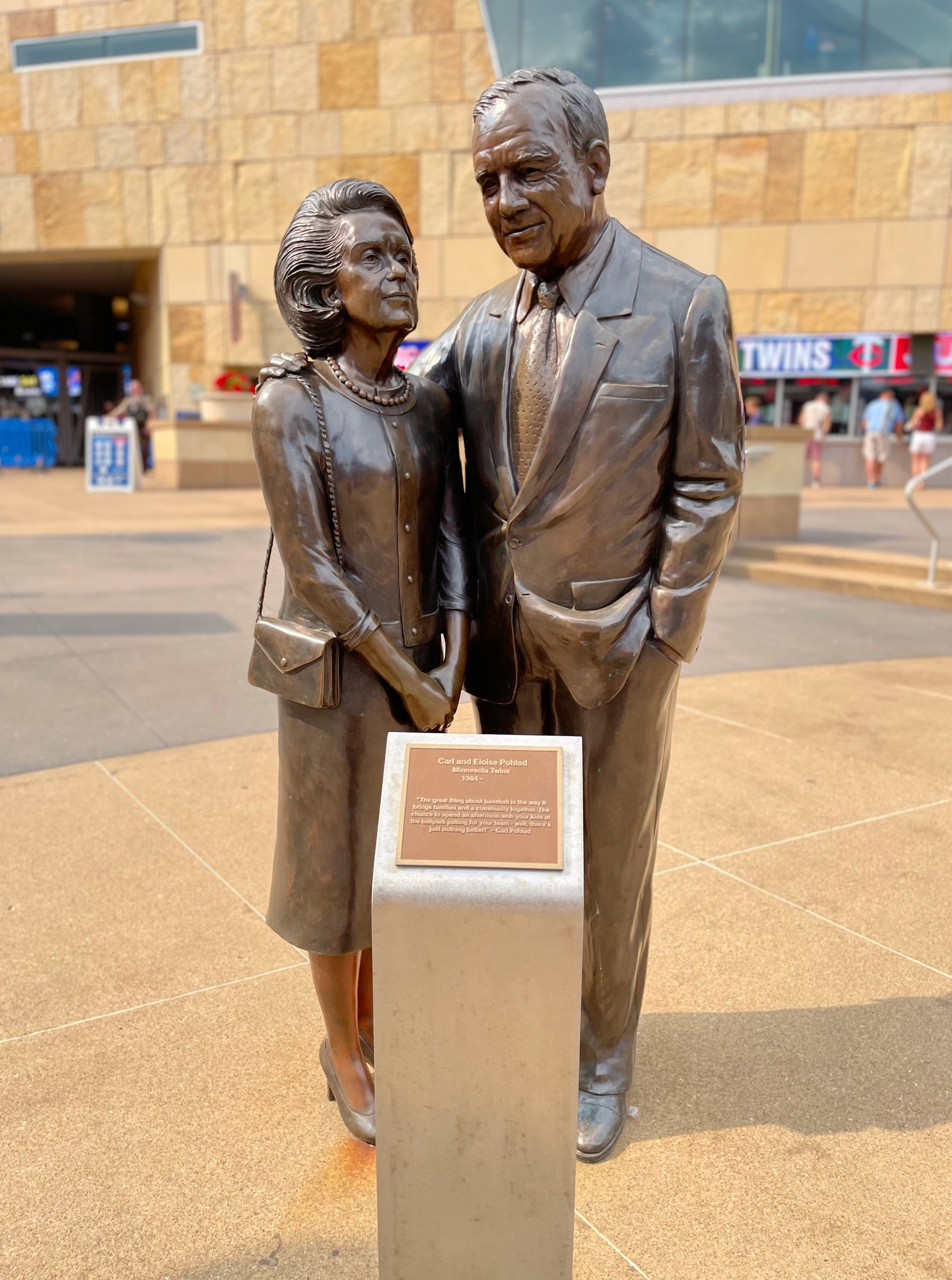
- Statue of Carl Pohlad and Eloise O'Rourke Pohlad at Target Field.
- Born: August 23, 1915; Valley Junction, Iowa, U.S.
- Died: January 5, 2009 (aged 93); Edina, Minnesota, U.S.
- Education: Gonzaga University
- Known for: Owner of the Minnesota Twins (1984–2009)
- Spouse: Mary Eloise O'Rourke (m. 1947; died 2003)
- Children: 3 (including Jim and Bill Pohlad)
- Awards: 1987 World Series and 1991 World Series Champion

Carl Ray Pohlad (August 23, 1915 – January 5, 2009) was an American financier from Minnesota. Pohlad is best known as the owner of the Minnesota Twins baseball franchise from 1984 (succeeding Calvin Griffith) until his death in 2009.

In 2009, Pohlad had an estimated net worth of $3.6 billion, placing him 102nd on the annual Forbes 400 list of the wealthiest Americans.

== Early life and education ==
Carl Pohlad was born on August 23, 1915, in Valley Junction, Iowa, to poor parents of Slovak descent, Mary M. (Sodak) and Michael Pohlad. He grew up in West Des Moines, Iowa and graduated from Valley High School in West Des Moines in 1934. He attended and played football for Compton Junior College in Southern California for a short time. Bing Crosby saw him play football and recruited him to play for his alma mater, Gonzaga University in Washington. Pohlad attended Gonzaga but dropped out after the football season of his senior year.

Pohlad was drafted in World War II and served from 1943 to 1946. During his service, he fought in Europe, spending time in France, Germany, and Austria. Pohlad was scheduled to participate in the Normandy Invasion (D-Day), but a case of poison oak kept him out of the invasion's early stages. He was wounded in battle, and was awarded the Purple Heart and a Bronze Star Medal.

After the war, Pohlad returned to Iowa and met Mary Eloise O'Rourke. They married and later moved to Edina, Minnesota. Eloise died in 2003. They had three sons during their 56-year marriage: James, Robert, and William, who all serve as Executive Board Members of the Minnesota Twins.

== Career ==
Pohlad got his start in the banking business by foreclosing farms during the Great Depression. After the Depression, he began investing in community banks. Over several decades, he built a banking empire. He bought deposits from The Midwest Federal Savings & Loan after its collapse in 1989. In late 1991 he sold his bank, Marquette Bank, which was owned by the Bank Shares, Inc. holding company, to First Bank System (now US Bank), with the deal finally closing in 1993. In 2006 Forbes ranked him tied for the 107th richest person in the United States, with a net worth of $2.6 billion.

Pohlad became president of the Twin City Rapid Transit (the Minneapolis St. Paul bus and streetcar company), saving it from Fred A. Ossanna (who was convicted in 1960 of illegally taking personal profit from the company). Pohlad was also the Vice President of Pohlad Companies, which owns several companies large and small, including Marquette Financial Companies, United Properties, River Road Entertainment, Stanton Group Holdings, Arcadia Solutions, KTWN FM (96.3 FM) Radio Station (through Northern Lights Broadcasting, a holding company), and JB Hudson's Jewelers in the Twin Cities, as well as a controlling interest in PepsiAmericas, the second-largest bottling group in the United States.

=== Minnesotan sports ===
Pohlad purchased the Minnesota Twins baseball franchise in 1984. The franchise and its predecessor, the original Washington Senators, had been in the hands of the Griffith family since 1919. Calvin Griffith inherited the team from uncle and family patriarch Clark Griffith in 1956 and moved it to the Twin Cities in 1961. Pohlad bought the team for $43.5 million—$32 million for the controlling 52% stake held by Calvin and his sister, Thelma Griffith Haynes, and $11.5 million for minority owner H. Gabriel Murphy's 40.4% interest.

The Twins won their first World Series in Minnesota (and the franchise's second overall) in 1987, and another World Series in 1991. Pohlad claimed he was close to selling the Twins in 1997 to North Carolina businessman Don Beaver, who would have moved the team to the Piedmont Triad area of the state. The defeat of a referendum for a stadium in that area and a lack of interest in a move to Charlotte killed the deal.

In 2001, Pohlad offered to sell the Twins to Major League Baseball for a reported $150 million as part of a contraction plan by the league, which would have effectively folded the team. The deal was not completed due to a court order binding the Twins to their lease with the Metrodome, and the team continued to play.

Pohlad also owned a part of the Minnesota Vikings from the mid-1980s to 1991.

== Death ==
Pohlad died of natural causes on January 5, 2009, at the age of 93. His funeral was held at the Basilica of Saint Mary, Minneapolis. His son Jim took over day-to-day operations of the Twins organization.

A bronze statue of Pohlad and his wife was installed at Target Field in 2010. It includes a plaque quoting Pohlad: "The great thing about baseball is the way it brings families and a community together. The chance to spend an afternoon with your kids at the ballpark pulling for your team—well, there's nothing better!"

== Honors ==
- 1984, Golden Plate Award of the American Academy of Achievement
- 2005, Minnesota Twins Hall of Fame

Preceded by Calvin Griffith; 1956–1984	Owner of the Minnesota Twins; 1984–2009	Succeeded by Jim Pohlad; 2009-present
