= North Loop =

North Loop refers to:

== Places ==
- North Loop, Minneapolis
- North Loop, Austin, Texas
- North Loop, El Paso, Texas

== See also ==
- South Loop
- West Loop
