= Hennepin Energy Recovery Center =

Waste-to-energy power station in Minneapolis, Minnesota

Coordinates: 44.9832°N 93.2800°W

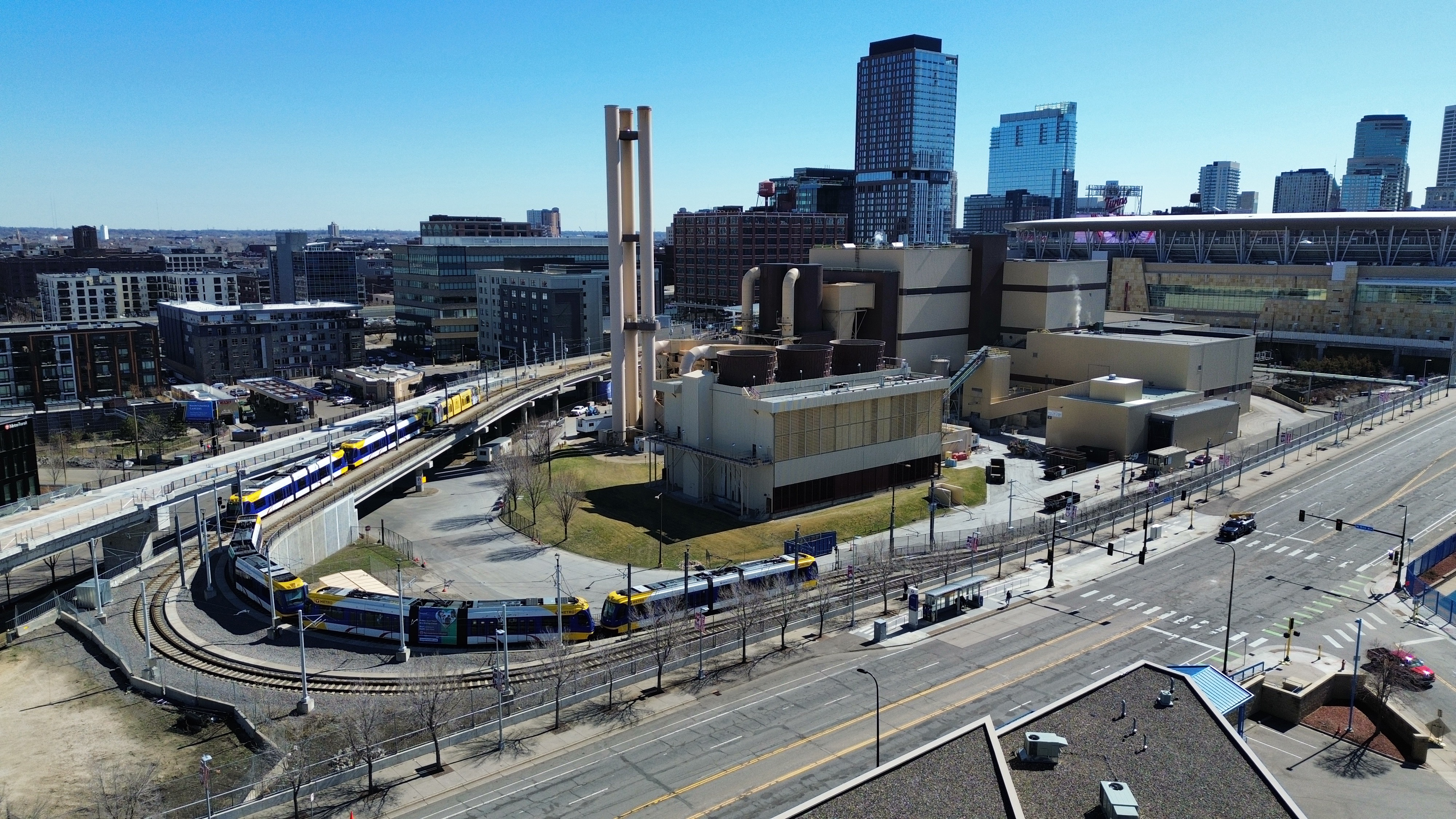
The Hennepin Energy Recovery Center with Target Field in the background and light rail tracks in the foreground.

The Hennepin Energy Recovery Center also called HERC is a waste-to-energy plant in Minneapolis, Minnesota. Following changes to state law in 1980 that prioritized incinerating garbage over directly filling landfills, HERC was developed and began generating electricity in 1989. Located in the North Loop neighborhood near Target Field, the facility replaced a Greyhound Lines bus maintenance facility. The facility which is owned by Hennepin County, collects almost half of all waste generated in the county.

Operation of the facility has been controversial with proposals to burn more trash or close the facility both proposed since 2009. Proposals to burn more trash cite the need to deal with an increasing amount of trash generated and to avoid filling landfills as quickly while proposals to close the facility cite the pollution generated and impact on surrounding neighborhoods.

In 2023 the Minnesota state legislature required 100% of electricity in the state to be generated by green energy by 2040 and reclassified waste-to-energy power generation as no longer being considered green. The Hennepin County board voted to develop a plan to close the facility between 2028 and 2040 with activists advocating for an earlier closure.

== Facility ==
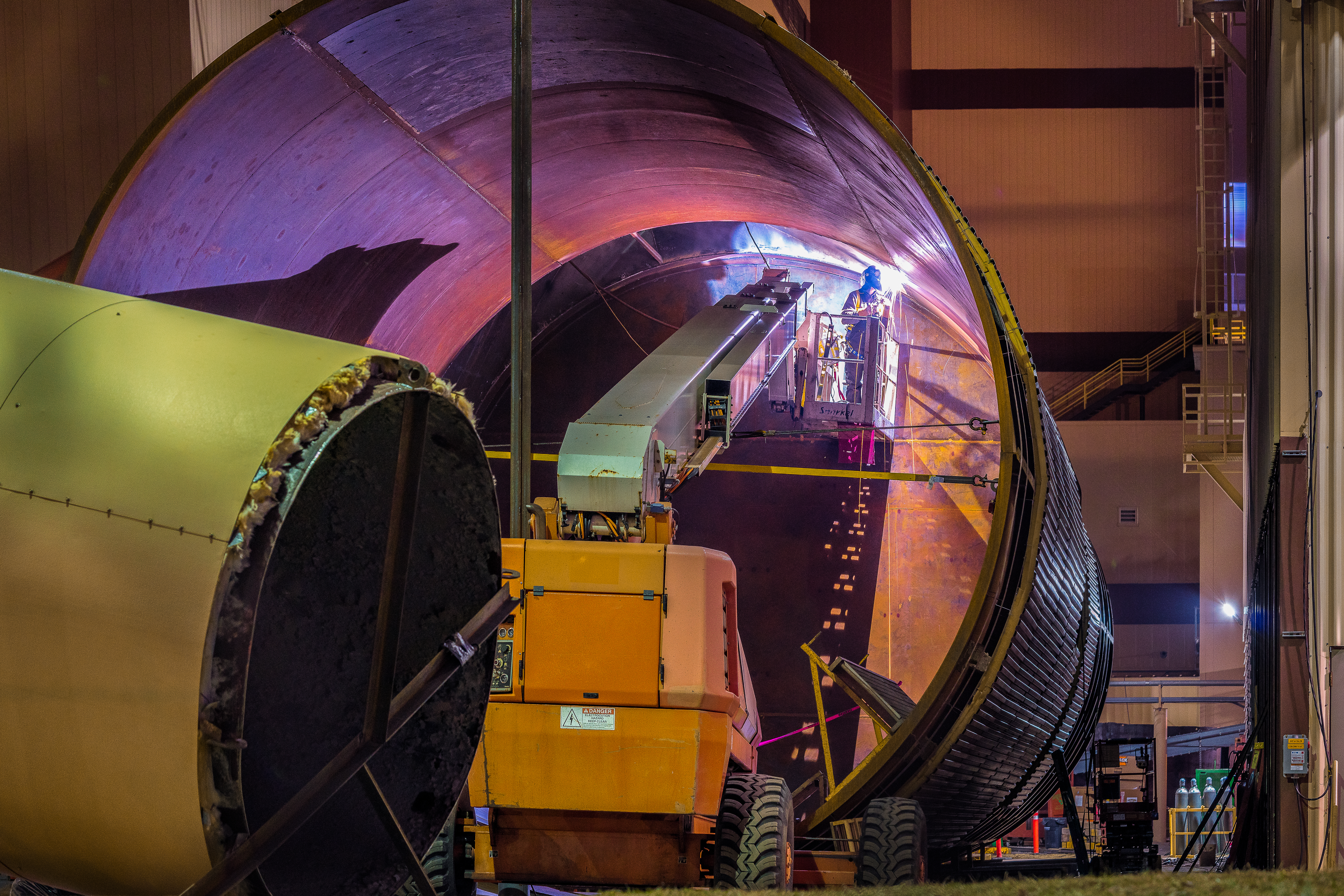
A water tank for the facility being worked on at night

Almost half of Hennepin County's waste is incinerated at the facility. The facility earns money from charging trash haulers to dump their waste, from selling the steam generated from burning the waste, from selling scrap metal left over from burning the waste and from selling the generated electricity. In 2023, the facility was expected to earn over $25 million from garbage haulers dumping their waste at the facility. The facility is one of the largest emitters of greenhouse gases in Minnesota, emitting the 31st most in the state but generates only 0.2% of air pollution in Hennepin County as most air pollution in Hennepin County is created by vehicles. The facility is managed by Great River Energy.

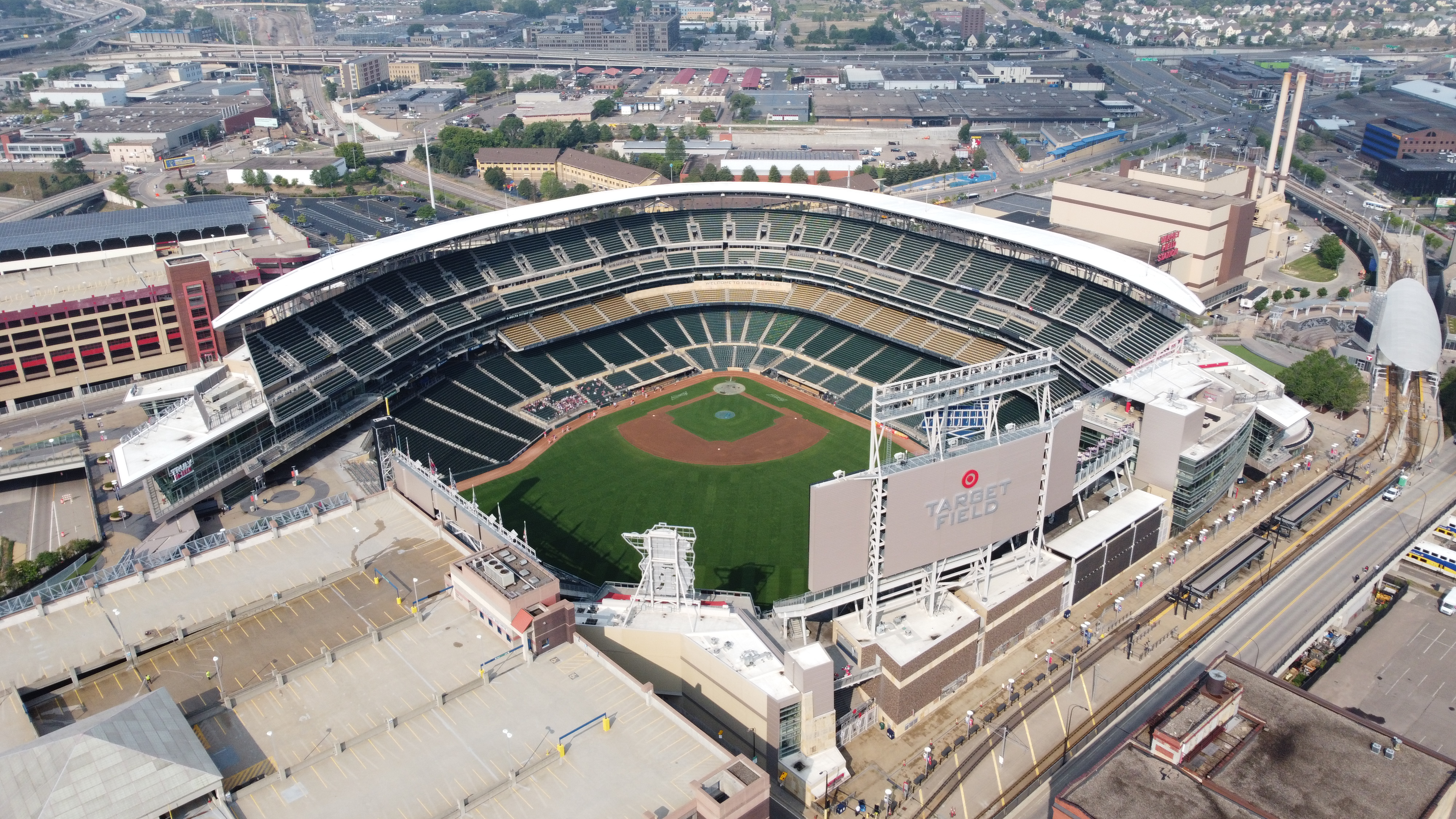
The Hennepin Energy Recovery Center is located in the upper right portion of this aerial image of Target Field.

Heat from the facility is used to melt snow on sidewalks near Target Field station. A portion of excess rain and snow runoff from Target Field station is used by the center. Heat is also used to melt snow in the infield of Target Field and encourage grass growth.

== History ==
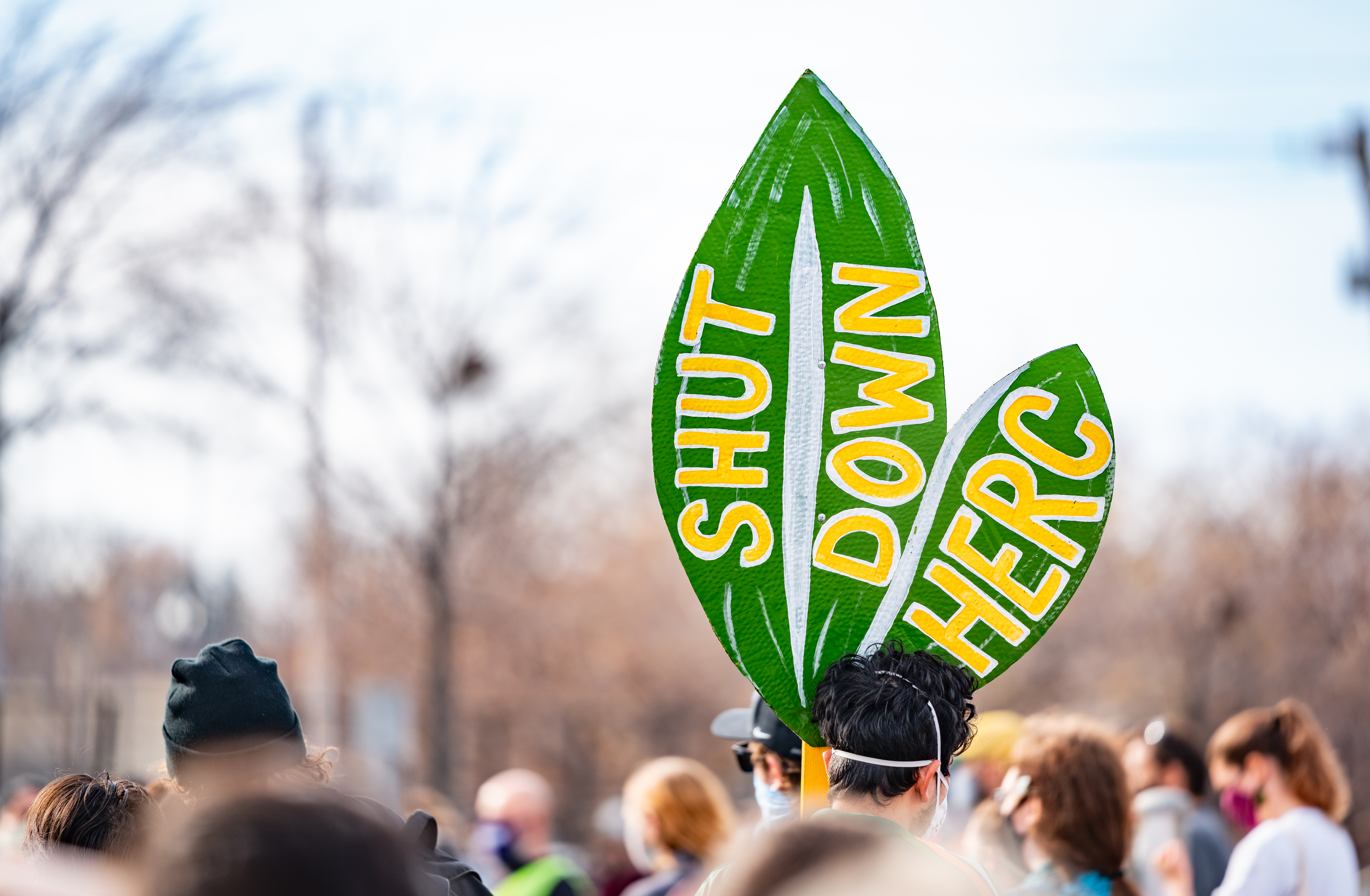
Protest in Minneapolis against HERC in November 2020

A 1980 Minnesota state law prioritized waste incineration over filling landfills. HERC was developed following that law and was one of more than 10 waste incinerators opened in Minnesota. The center replaced a Greyhound Lines bus maintenance facility and at the time there were few people living nearby. The center cost $189 million to construct. HERC first started generating electricity in 1989 and is one of seven garbage incinerators in Minnesota. The facility was bought by General Electric in 1988 and sold to Hennepin County in 2003. Covanta Energy operated the facility from opening in 1989 until 2018 when Great River Energy began managing the center.

The future of HERC has been controversial with competing ideas to expand or close the facility. Since 2009 there has been discussion about expanding use of the facility or even closing it. Environmental justice advocates are concerned about the pollution generated near local neighborhoods. In 2009 Hennepin County failed to get approval to burn more waste at the facility.

After attempting to increase the amount of garbage burned in the facility by 20% in 2013, Hennepin County decided that instead of attempting to gain approval to burn more garbage, that the county would push Minneapolis to collect organic waste. Environmental activists had fought against expanding the amount of trash incinerated and 2013 mayoral candidates had been divided on their opinion on whether to approve increase burning.

When Hennepin County's climate action plan was approved in 2021, it did not plan for the closure of HERC. Environmental justice organizers criticized the climate action plan and the decision to continue to operate HERC.

== Future ==
A law passed during the 2023 Minnesota legislative session required Hennepin County to develop a plan to close the facility in order to receive $26 million in funding for an organic waste processing facility. Legislation required 100% of electricity in Minnesota to be generated by green energy by 2040 and waste incineration was not categorized as green energy. In October, the Hennepin County board voted to close the facility at some point between 2028 and 2040. Environmental justice advocates had argued for closure by 2025.
