= Target Field =

Baseball stadium in Minneapolis, Minnesota

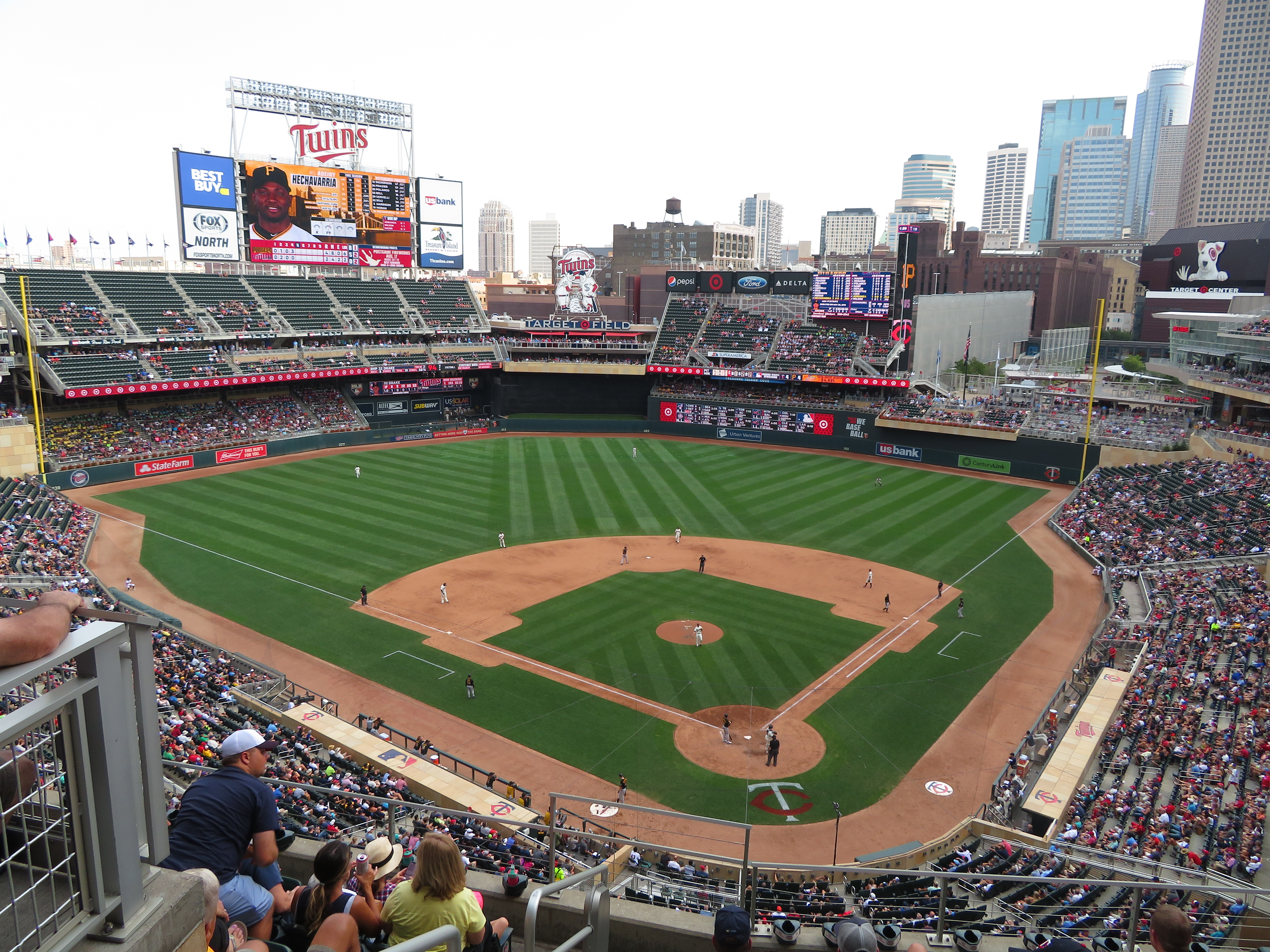
- Target Field in 2018

- Location in Minnesota Location in the United States
- Address: 1 Twins Way
- Location: Minneapolis, Minnesota, U.S.
- Coordinates: 44°58′54″N 93°16′42″W
- Owner: Minnesota Ballpark Authority
- Operator: Twins Ballpark LLC
- Capacity: 39,504 (2010–2012); 39,021 (2013–2015); 38,871 (2016); 38,885 (2017); 38,649 (2018); 38,544 (2019–present)
- Surface: Kentucky Bluegrass
- Record attendance: 45,000+ (P!nk, August 10, 2023)
- Field size: Left Field – 339 feet (103 m); Left-Center – 377 feet (115 m); Center Field left corner – 411 feet (125 m); Center Field right corner – 403 feet (123 m); Right-Center – 367 feet (112 m); Right Field – 328 feet (100 m)
- Public transit: Blue Line; Green Line at Target Field station

Construction
- Groundbreaking: August 30, 2007
- Opened: April 12, 2010
- Cost: US$555 million
- Architects: Populous (formerly HOK Sport); Hammel, Green and Abrahamson
- Project managers: International Facilities Group, LLC.
- Structural engineer: Walter P Moore Engineers and Consultants
- Services engineers: M-E Engineers, Inc.
- General contractor: Mortenson/Thor

Tenants
- Minnesota Twins (MLB) (2010–present); Minnesota Golden Gophers (NCAA) (2011)

Website
- mlb.com/twins/ballpark

Target Field is a baseball stadium in the historic warehouse district of downtown Minneapolis. Since its opening in 2010, the stadium has been the ballpark of Major League Baseball's Minnesota Twins. It is named for Target Corporation, which is headquartered in Minneapolis. The stadium hosted the 2014 Major League Baseball All-Star Game. It has also served as the home of other local and regional baseball events.

The ballpark is open-air; though originally designed for baseball, it has also hosted football, soccer, hockey games, and concerts.

In 2010, ESPN The Magazine ranked Target Field as the number one baseball stadium experience in North America.

== Summary ==
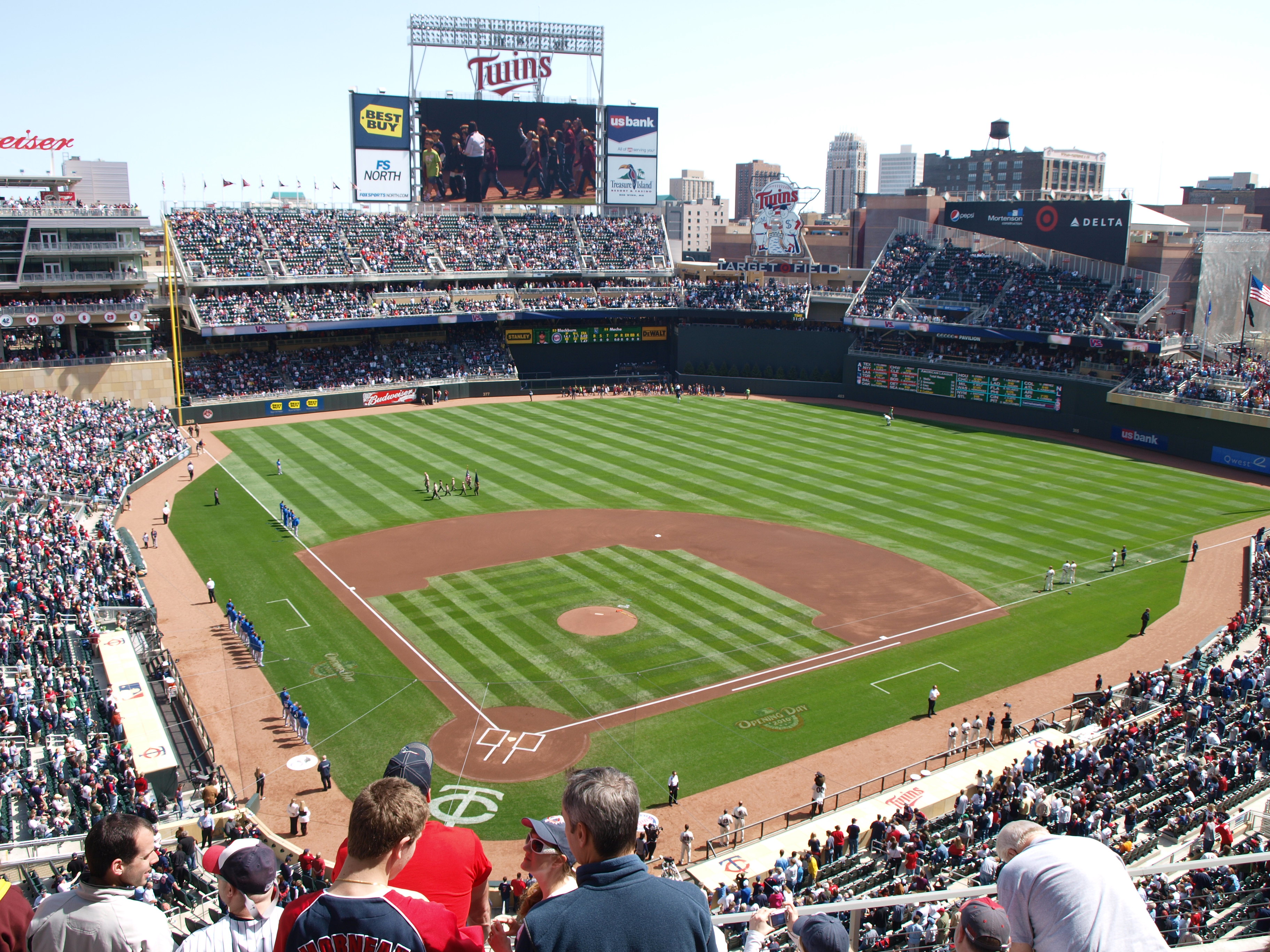
Target Field during a game vs. Kansas City in 2010

Target Field is the Twins/Senators sixth ballpark, and the franchise's third in Minnesota. The Twins had played 28 seasons at the Hubert H. Humphrey Metrodome, and before that 21 seasons at Metropolitan Stadium. The Twins shared both facilities with the Minnesota Vikings, and the Metrodome with the University of Minnesota Golden Gophers football team.

The final budget for construction was $435 million, of which $175 million was paid by the Twins and $260 million was paid by Hennepin County by way of a 0.15% county-wide sales tax. An additional $120 million in infrastructure costs were split between the county ($90 million), the team ($20 million), Target Corporation ($4.5 million), the Minnesota Department of Transportation ($3.5 million) and the Minnesota Ballpark Authority ($2 million) bringing the project's total cost to US$555 million.

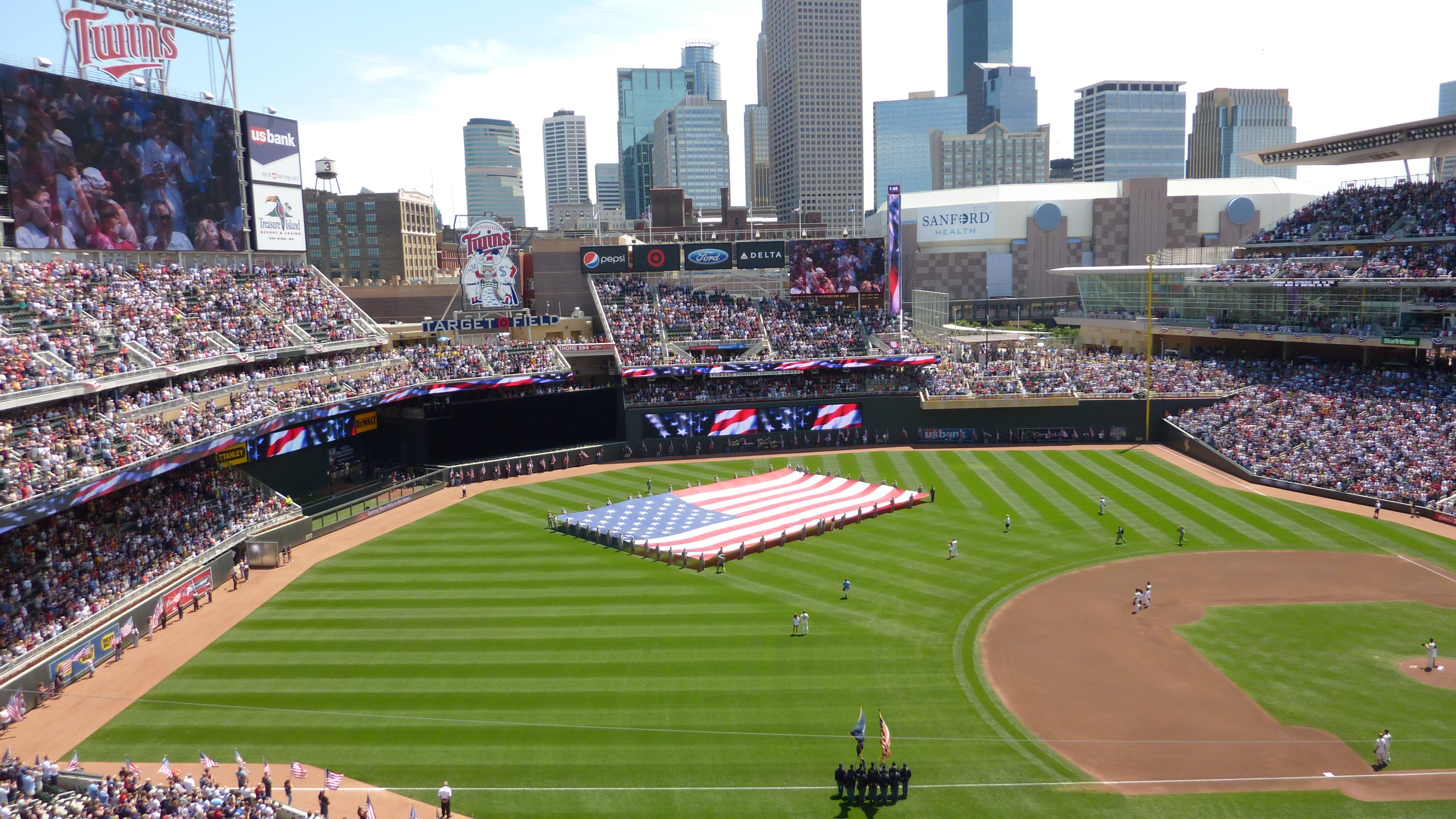
Armed Services Appreciation Day, on July 3, 2011. The Twins set a three-game series attendance record (123,385) against the Milwaukee Brewers.

== History ==
=== Background ===
The Twins were in their 13th season in the Metrodome when they formally declared their desire to find a new home on July 18, 1994. Carl Pohlad, owner of the Twins, told the Metropolitan Sports Facilities Commission (owners of the Metrodome) the current facility was "economically obsolete" due to changes in the economy of Major League Baseball. This declaration started a process which would culminate nearly 16 years later with the opening of Target Field. In the intervening years, many ideas, financing plans and possible locations came and went. The long process included threats of relocation, infighting between the Twin Cities of Minneapolis and St. Paul, and numerous pieces of legislation (both passed and not passed) at various levels of government. The process spanned the terms of three Minnesota governors, five mayors of Minneapolis or St. Paul, and even two long-tenured Twins managers.

=== Timeline ===
- 1961 – The original Washington Senators become the Minnesota Twins, and move to Metropolitan Stadium
- 1982 – Twins move to HHH Metrodome
- 1984 – Calvin Griffith sells Twins to Carl Pohlad
- 1994 – Pohlad declares Metrodome "economically obsolete"
- 1996 – First new ballpark plan fails to win support
- 1997 – Second new ballpark plan fails to win support; Minneapolis stadium contributions capped by referendum
- 1998 – Referendum to build ballpark in Greensboro, North Carolina fails
- 1999 – Referendum to build ballpark in St. Paul, Minnesota fails
- 2000 – Eventual site of Target Field identified
- 2001 – Twins are targeted for contraction by MLB
- 2002 – Hennepin County makes its first financing proposal; St. Paul options eliminated
- 2005 – Twins and Hennepin County reach financing agreement
- 2006 – Ballpark legislation enacted
- 2007 – Construction begins, land dispute settled
- 2010 – Twins move to Target Field

Source: Minnesota Legislative Reference Library

=== Early plans (1994–1999) ===
Immediately following Pohlad's 1994 declaration of intent, the Twins began making plans to build a new, retractable-roof stadium on a site just north of the Metrodome. Extensive conceptual work went into the site and stadium. At that time, the desired site was largely underused as surface parking, despite being adjacent to the Mississippi River, and located in the city's historic milling district. It included land which would be used for the Guthrie Theater (2006), Gold Medal Park (2007), and high-end housing.

==== 1996 ====
The riverfront plan formed the basis for all of the early discussions, and was first presented to the Minnesota Legislature during the 1996 session. It did not pass, largely due to widespread public sentiment that Pohlad, Minnesota's second most wealthy citizen, should pay for a new facility himself.

==== 1997 ====
After that failure, private negotiations between Pohlad and Governor Arne Carlson yielded a deal which was brought to the 1997 legislative session. The Twins had agreed to make an up-front financial contribution to kick-start the project, as well as sell 49% of team ownership to the state. This plan unraveled when local media reported that the complicated "contribution" to be made by the team amounted to a loan from Pohlad which was to be repaid with interest. Public outrage made passing this plan impossible.

Later that same year, the voters in Minneapolis overwhelmingly approved a referendum which prevented the city of Minneapolis from ever spending more than $10 million on a professional sports facility without approval from voters. This effectively removed the city from consideration as a financial partner for a new Twins ballpark.

==== 1998 ====
Meanwhile, the Twins’ Metrodome lease was set to expire in 1998. Governor Carlson felt the issue pressing enough that he called a special session of the Minnesota Legislature for that fall. In advance of the session, Pohlad announced he had signed a letter of intent to sell the team to a potential ownership group in North Carolina (Piedmont Triad) led by Don Beaver. The sale would be nullified if either a new stadium was approved in Minnesota, or a referendum to build a new stadium in Greensboro failed.

The Minnesota legislature not only defeated the stadium bill, but passed a resolution urging Congress to intervene in what it saw to be the worst practices of professional sports. Then, on May 5, 1998, voters in Greensboro rejected the ballpark referendum by a wide margin and the sale of the team was cancelled. Meanwhile, the public had come to view Pohlad very unfavorably.

==== 1999 ====
St. Paul mayor Norm Coleman jumped into this void with an enthusiastic pitch to move the Twins to his city. Several downtown locations were offered, the most likely option being adjacent to the new Xcel Energy Center (though another site considered was in the Lowertown neighborhood, a location which eventually became CHS Field, home of the St. Paul Saints). A referendum was scheduled to ask St. Paul voters to approve a sales tax increase for the city's contribution to the project, which would have been an open-air ballpark. Once again, Pohlad agreed to "sell" the team contingent upon the outcome of a referendum. This sale would have been to a group led by Minnesota-based billionaires Glen Taylor and Robert Naegele. Because Pohlad was so unpopular, it was thought that removing him from the transaction might help the prospects of the referendum, but it did not. On November 2, 1999, St. Paul voters rejected the plan by a large margin and the concept quickly evaporated.

=== Warehouse District site identified (2000) ===
The threat of the Twins moving to St. Paul had caught the attention of the business community in Minneapolis, which, up to this point, had been largely silent on the issue. During the run-up to the St. Paul referendum in 1999, an independent working group was formed by Minneapolis businessmen Bruce Lambrecht and Rich Pogin, representatives of a group of investors which owned the Rapid Park parking lot in the historic warehouse district on the northern edge of downtown Minneapolis. This group, initially known as Minnesota Urban Ballpark, and later as MN Twinsville, formed with the express purpose of bringing their land into the discussion about sites for a new Twins ballpark.

At first, the 8-acre site appeared to be an extremely unlikely location for a modern professional baseball facility. Besides being far smaller than most MLB sites (modern facilities typically require 16–20 acres (6.5–8.1 ha)), it was hemmed in by railroad tracks, a freeway, and two city streets passing on bridges. Though very near to Target Center, it was also adjacent to the Hennepin Energy Recovery Center (HERC), more commonly known as the city's "garbage burner," considered by some to be an undesirable neighbor for a ballpark.

But the site's perceived liabilities were easily offset by significant assets. Careful measurements were made by Lambrecht and local architect David Albersman, which proved that there was enough room for a baseball field and the amenities associated with a Major League ballpark. The site was adjacent to three large, underused parking ramps, and at the potential nexus of a light rail line then being planned (ultimately the Metro Transit Blue Line), and a commuter rail line also under consideration (the eventual Northstar Line). It was also controlled by a single owner who would be a willing seller. This fact alone would significantly simplify the process of acquisition by a governmental entity for a large-scale project. Owing largely to these logistical advantages, as well as an expansive view of the Minneapolis skyline, and the persistence of Lambrecht and Pogin's group, this site would eventually come to house Target Field.

In early 2000, Lambrecht's group commissioned a visit by Earl Santee of Populous (then known as HOK Sport) to evaluate whether the site had the potential to house Major League Baseball. His visit, independent of the Twins and all government entities, happened with no publicity whatsoever. Santee reviewed the site and reacted with skepticism, but saw no fatal flaws, nothing that made a ballpark impossible. He agreed to provide the working group with a concept drawing of a ballpark on that site, an image which was first published in August 2000, and quickly became the center of their ultimately successful campaign.

As Santee's dramatic drawing became more widely published, and Lambrecht and Pogin ramped up their lobbying efforts, others began to realize the advantages of the site. This included Mark Oyaas, founder of New Ballpark, Inc., a separate group of downtown Minneapolis business leaders, who sought to create a private financing plan for a stadium. They quickly settled on Rapid Park as their preferred ballpark site, which enhanced its visibility significantly. The Twins, however, completely ignored Rapid Park, and kept their distance from all of the ad hoc working groups. They would eventually go on record as believing that the Rapid Park site was too small and constrained to house the type of facility they sought to build.

=== Committees, contraction and competition (2000–2002) ===
==== 2000 ====
No fewer than three committees were created in 2000 to offer recommendations on how to proceed.

The city of Minneapolis created a panel of citizens known as C-17 to consider various financing models. Their final report, issued in February 2001, while not specifically recommending a site, heavily featured the concept drawing of the Rapid Park site on multiple pages. The committee recommended that the city continue its discussions with New Ballpark, Inc., in the hopes of finding a private financing solution. Even before the work of the C-17 was complete, another (unnamed) group of staff analysts within city government, working with the Metropolitan Community Development Agency (MCDA), formally recommended the Rapid Park site to the City Council.

Simultaneously, the Twins assembled a 130-member advisory group, dubbed Minnesotans for Major League Baseball, which met to discuss possible stadium alternatives. Their deliberations included a meeting with Bud Selig, commissioner of baseball, to discuss economic issues within the sport. Their final report did not recommend a site (and did not even mention Rapid Park), but did provide advice to the team on how to proceed in winning public approval for any plan.

Late in 2000, Twins CEO Chris Clouser proposed playing three games in a temporary outdoor stadium to be built adjacent to the Mall of America in Bloomington. He hoped to demonstrate the pleasures of outdoor baseball as a way of jump-starting the political process. The proposal ran into problems from insurance companies, the Minnesota Vikings (who stood to lose Metrodome revenue) and Major League Baseball. It was ultimately scrapped.

==== 2001 ====
During the 2001 legislative session, the Twins pushed for a new financing plan based on ideas gleaned from their advisory committee. The $300 million site-neutral plan would have featured a $150 million contribution from the Pohlads, $50 million from private enterprises, and the remaining $100 million in the form of an interest-free loan from the state of Minnesota. Many viewed the deal as significantly better for taxpayers than the 1997 plan, but the details of the financial arrangements once again were very complicated. Ultimately, the proposal fell victim to a political climate filled with distaste for the economics of baseball, general anti-stadium sentiments, and an unrelated budget standoff which nearly shut down the Minnesota government.

Despite that legislative misfire, in the summer of 2001 the city of Minneapolis became quite serious about the warehouse district site for a ballpark, after selecting the Twins' preferred riverfront site to house the new Guthrie Theater. Though no deal was struck to purchase the Rapid Park land at that time, an initial valuation of $10 million was assumed by the city for a roughly 10-acre (4.0 ha) parcel. Though not a realistic amount, it did fall conveniently within the restrictions of the 1997 referendum. The Twins were not involved in these discussions, and still exhibited no public interest whatsoever in the warehouse district location.

The Twins, stung by the repeated rejections, and feeling that they had no real prospects for a new ballpark in the Twin Cities, next became officially associated with Major League Baseball's long-rumored contraction plans. On November 6, 2001, MLB owners voted 28–2 to authorize the elimination of two teams, the Twins and the Montreal Expos (though the teams were not named publicly). The Pohlads were reportedly offered a $250 million check to fold their franchise.

This attempt at placing more pressure on decision-makers ultimately failed—spectacularly and quickly—when, a mere 10 days later, Hennepin County District Court Judge Harry Crump ruled that the Twins, by virtue of Major League Baseball's federal anti-trust exemption, could not act as a typical business and simply buy out their Metrodome lease. Their standing as a community asset meant that they had an obligation to honor the lease and continue playing. His decision was upheld by the Minnesota Court of Appeals on January 21, 2002, and the Minnesota Supreme Court refused to hear an appeal on February 5, 2002, effectively ending contraction as a negotiating tactic (though its echoes would remain until a new labor agreement between MLB and the MLBPA was reached on August 30, 2002).

==== 2002 ====
Even as the Twins were forced to continue playing in late 2001, the seeds of the eventual financing solution were sown when Hennepin County, in which the city of Minneapolis is located, began to express interest in being a financial partner in a ballpark. Unfortunately for the Twins, Minnesota governor Jesse Ventura wanted to foster competition between the various localities, thinking it would spur more creativity in the structure of any deal. Instead, St. Paul legislators, led by new mayor Randy Kelly, and aided by Hennepin County legislators wanting to keep their constituents off the hook, played hardball, and amended the ballpark bill so that only cities—not counties—could become financial partners in a ballpark. They knew that this move would eliminate both Hennepin County and Minneapolis (by virtue of the $10 million cap on any contribution), and leave only St. Paul as a viable partner. The bill passed, and Ventura signed it, but the strategy backfired. The Twins investigated and quickly rejected St. Paul as an implausible place to build. Nothing came of the bill, and it effectively ended any serious talk of the team moving to St. Paul.

As 2002 ended, the Twins proclaimed publicly their dissatisfaction with the Rapid Park site. Twins president Dave St. Peter was quoted as saying that the site was "set off to the side of Downtown, and [has] the garbage incinerator issue."

=== Evolving deals (2003–2005) ===
==== 2003 ====
With the 2003 Minnesota Legislature locked in bitter budget issues, the ballpark was never a central focus. No ballpark bill was passed during the session.

New governor Tim Pawlenty, who, as a legislator, had been against public spending on stadiums, created the 20-member Stadium Screening Committee to "solve Minnesota's stadium conundrum." The committee was notable primarily for focusing equally on facilities for the Vikings and the Twins. They requested proposals from anyone, anywhere, who had a compelling idea for a stadium, and received 26, some more serious than others. Serious baseball proposals were received from Hennepin County/City of Minneapolis, and the City of St. Paul. The Twins, though they did not either send or endorse a proposal, did premiere a new design and scale model for the committee. Football proposals were received from the cities of Blaine and Eden Prairie. In the end, the recommendations in their final report (issued on February 2, 2004) were so general that they added nothing new to the debate, and the committee was dismissed as being for appearances only.

Separately, Bruce Lambrecht and Rich Pogin reframed the discussion of their site with a proposal to create "Twinsville" as a neighborhood anchored by the new Twins ballpark. Concept drawings showed apartment buildings, commercial buildings and townhouses flanking the ballpark to the north and south, all clustered around a newly daylighted Bassett Creek (which runs in a deep culvert beneath the land). In a nod to Pawlenty's football focus, one provocative drawing included a football stadium to the west (on the current HERC site), sharing a retractable roof with the baseball facility. But this concept also hinted at the possibility that the land might have more valuable uses than as a home for the Twins, an idea which would play a significant role later. Nevertheless, their reframing succeeded in jump-starting interest in the project as plans began to form for bringing about action during the forthcoming 2004 legislative session.

The year ended with Minneapolis officially authorizing negotiations with Land Partners II (the investment group which owned the Rapid Park site) to gain control of the land.

==== 2004 ====
Early in 2004 the Twins unveiled a new vision of a stadium which could be built on any site with a footprint of at least four square blocks. Two concept drawings, with and without a retractable roof, were accompanied by a scale model (with roof) which was displayed at TwinsFest in January at the Metrodome.

The report of Gov. Pawlenty's Stadium Screening Committee set off what the Star Tribune described as "bitter financing competition between St. Paul and Hennepin County." Though never seriously in the running, St. Paul's efforts effectively sabotaged Hennepin County again. Pawlenty advanced a plan that could build up to three stadiums (Twins, Vikings, and Gophers) albeit with uncertain financing. That uncertainty, combined with dollar amounts now in the billions, and intense partisan bickering over unrelated budget issues, meant that the stadium bill took a back seat and was not passed during the 2004 session.

Behind the scenes in 2004, Hennepin County, led by commissioner Mike Opat, continued negotiations with the Twins, settling on the rough framework for financing which was ultimately used.

And the city of Minneapolis, acting on the recommendation of its own advisory committee, worked out an option (assignable to Hennepin County) to purchase the Rapid Park land. They agreed to pay $12.95 million plus 5 acres (2.0 ha) of adjacent land in exchange for the rights to purchase the 8-acre (3.2 ha) main ballpark site, effectively agreeing to pay $4.3 million per acre. This agreement expired at the end of 2004 when no stadium bill was passed, but it would play a key role in the later condemnation proceedings.

==== 2005 ====
On April 26, 2005, Hennepin County and the Twins announced that they had reached a deal on financing. It closely matched what would be the eventual funding solution. In it, the Twins essentially relinquished their desire to put a roof on any new facility, accepting that it was not a financial possibility.

Though the ballpark was a subject of sometimes intense discussion in the 2005 Minnesota Legislative session, it fell victim to a political climate which resulted in a lengthy shutdown of Minnesota government due to a budget impasse. No action was taken in either the regular session or the special session which resolved the budget dispute. Until the very end of the year, proponents held out hope that Pawlenty would call a second special session just for the purpose of dealing with the stadium issue, but he did not.

=== Success (2006) ===
With the entire Minnesota Legislature up for reelection in 2006, the session began with no expectation that a ballpark bill could pass. All parties were now committed to both the Hennepin County financing plan and the Rapid Park site, meaning all of the building blocks were in place for a deal, but optimism among the stakeholders was almost impossible to find.

On April 18, 2006, Hennepin County formally approved a plan to contribute $392 million to a Twins ballpark on the Rapid Park site. The funds would be raised through a county-wide 0.15% sales tax which would also raise funds to support the Hennepin County Libraries and youth sports activities within the county. The plan was exempted from any public referendum.

Final deliberations in the legislature centered on whether a referendum either was or should be required for any portion of the financing. All sides recognized that such a requirement would kill the project, and thus it became a proxy for deciding whether a ballpark should be built at all.

On May 20, 2006, the Minnesota Legislature approved a bill authorizing a new Twins ballpark on the Rapid Park site at an initial budgeted cost of $522 million. The cost was to be split between the Minnesota Twins (25%) and Hennepin County (75%). The Twins agreed to a total contribution of $130 million. A public referendum was not required.

On May 26, 2006, Governor Tim Pawlenty signed the legislation in front of a large crowd at the Metrodome before the start of a Twins game.

Several procedural votes were still necessary by the Hennepin County Board, any of which had the potential to derail the project. The final of these was held on August 29, 2006, officially authorizing the imposition of the sales tax, effective January 1, 2007. With the success of this vote, all legislative pieces were in place to formally authorize the ballpark, though acquisition of the Rapid Park land remained.

Construction of Target Field began on May 21, 2007.

=== Land dispute (2007) ===
As work began on the ballpark, a final major snag threatened to derail the entire project for almost a year.

The bill authorizing the financing of Target Field specified a cap of $90 million for onsite infrastructure costs, which included land acquisition. Surprisingly, even though they were now authorized, Hennepin County did not take any action to acquire the land until very late in 2006.

Eventually, it was revealed that the county had budgeted $13.5 million for the land, or about $1.7 million per acre for 8 acres (3.2 ha), mistakenly assuming they could acquire it for roughly the dollar amount of the 2004 option agreement between the city of Minneapolis and Land Partners II (the investment group which owned Rapid Park). The dollar amount on that deal had been $12.9 million, though the deal had also included 5 acres (2.0 ha) of adjacent land. Effectively, it would have paid for only three acres of the 8-acre (3.2 ha) site that Hennepin County now needed to acquire, at a proposed price of $4.3 million per acre.

In addition to those numbers being far apart, much had changed since the 2004 deal expired. The Hiawatha Light Rail (later Blue Line) had opened and become a huge success. Funding for the Northstar commuter rail line had been approved. As anticipated, these two lines would eventually converge on the northwest corner of the Rapid Park Site, now the likely location for a future multi-modal transportation hub. The site itself had been rezoned in 2005, allowing its development into high end commercial and residential space. Land Partners II had entered into a development agreement with Hines Corporation for this purpose, as a backup in the event that the land was not chosen as home for the Twins. Given the scarcity of land available in downtown Minneapolis, the land owners had multiple reasons to believe that the land's value had, in fact, increased substantially since 2004, with or without a ballpark.

Still, Lambrecht and Pogin, now acting as spokesmen for Land Partners II and Hines, had long been on record as "willing sellers" of the land for a ballpark, stipulating only that their investment group would expect "fair market value." Eventually, they admitted that they fully expected the transaction to take place in eminent domain (condemnation) proceedings, but accepted that inevitability because it would likely result in a fair purchase price, which they had reason to believe would be at least as much as the per-acre amount of the 2004 deal, or $4.3 million per acre (approximately $34 million for the entire 8-acre site), and perhaps significantly more due to market changes.

Hennepin County claimed that accepting the price set by an eminent domain judge was not an option for them, due to the infrastructure cap. Any additional money needed for the land would have to come out of some other piece of infrastructure. If the price set by a judge came in over their budget, they would have no funds to pay, and the project could collapse. But eminent domain did offer them the advantage of getting started on construction while working out the details of the land price later.

On September 19, 2006, Hennepin County officially authorized acquisition of the land, including doing so under eminent domain proceedings, if necessary. In late October the initial county appraisal of the land came in at the same $13.5 million that had been budgeted. Eminent domain proceedings were then initiated on November 1, 2006, as a precaution in case no agreement on land value could be reached by the time construction needed to start. The county set March 1, 2007 as the target date for finalizing acquisition of the Rapid Park site. There had still been no negotiations between the county and the land owners.

After months passed without an agreement, a harsh war of words erupted in the media in February 2007. The Twins angrily cancelled a planned unveiling of the ballpark design scheduled for February 15, declaring that the entire project was in jeopardy. Jerry Bell of the Twins and Mike Opat of Hennepin County gave multiple interviews in which they described the land owners as being "unwilling sellers," "greedy," "lawyered-up," painted them as "greedy landowners in black hats," and as not negotiating in good faith. Lambrecht and Pogin continued to insist that they had an obligation to their investors to secure nothing more than "fair market value" for the land. They repeatedly said that they would accept whatever valuation was determined in eminent domain proceedings, while media reports would later reveal their internal valuation (required by eminent domain laws) to be $65 million.

In early April 2007 Hennepin County received assurances that the Twins would provide additional funds, if necessary, to cover cost overruns on infrastructure, including the land acquisition. This allowed the initiation of "quick take" proceedings, and the county gained control of the site effective May 1, 2007, with a final sale price to be determined later. This effectively mitigated the problem of the infrastructure cap and allowed the unveiling of the ballpark design on April 12, and construction to begin on May 21, 2007.

Despite the beginning of construction, the land stalemate dragged on for months, as did the harsh rhetoric in the media. Some members of the media and public placed blame on Hennepin County for not securing the land before getting authorization to build the ballpark, while others laid the blame on the sellers for allegedly increasing their price once the legislation passed.

On August 19, 2007, a three-member condemnation panel set the value of the land at $23.8 million by a vote of 2–1. The next day, a separate opinion valuing the land at $33.2 million was filed by the dissenting judge. The landowners immediately announced that they would appeal the condemnation ruling, and a court date was set for November.

Ten days later, on August 30, 2007, the ceremonial groundbreaking took place, despite the ongoing land dispute (the event had been scheduled for August 2, but was postponed in the aftermath of the I-35W bridge collapse).

Eventually, after exchanging divergent values for several weeks, both parties agreed to mediation, and with the November court date fast approaching, the final agreement was reached on October 12, 2007, with a negotiated price of $29 million. To make the deal possible, the Twins had agreed to make up the $15 million difference between that price and what Hennepin County had originally budgeted. In exchange, they received the right to develop several acres near the ballpark. Land Partners II received property and air rights over Dock Street, which was to be created for access to the ballpark from the north.

With the establishment of the land value, the final potential obstacle to the completion of Target Field was resolved.

=== Naming ===
On September 15, 2008, the Twins and Minneapolis-based Target Corporation announced that the ballpark would be named Target Field. Financial terms of the naming rights agreement were not disclosed. The company's investment also funded a pedestrian bridge from the ballpark to downtown, Target Plaza, more seating, canopies and public art.

=== Design ===
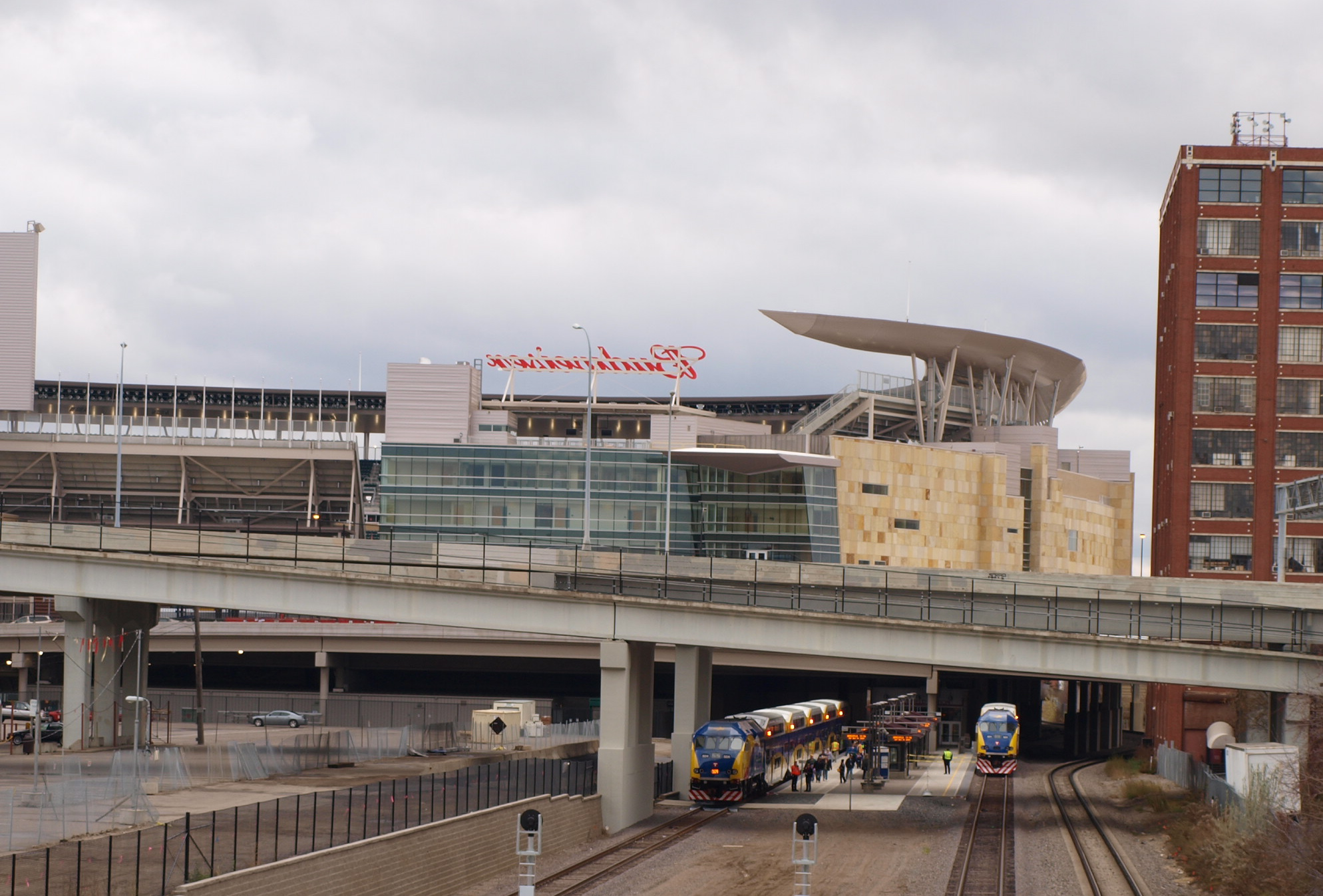
Exterior of Target Field, including a view of the commuter platform at Target Field station.

Designed by Populous with Bruce Miller as principal lead, Target Field is a modern take on other Populous-designed stadiums such as Oriole Park at Camden Yards in Baltimore, PNC Park in Pittsburgh, and Oracle Park in San Francisco.

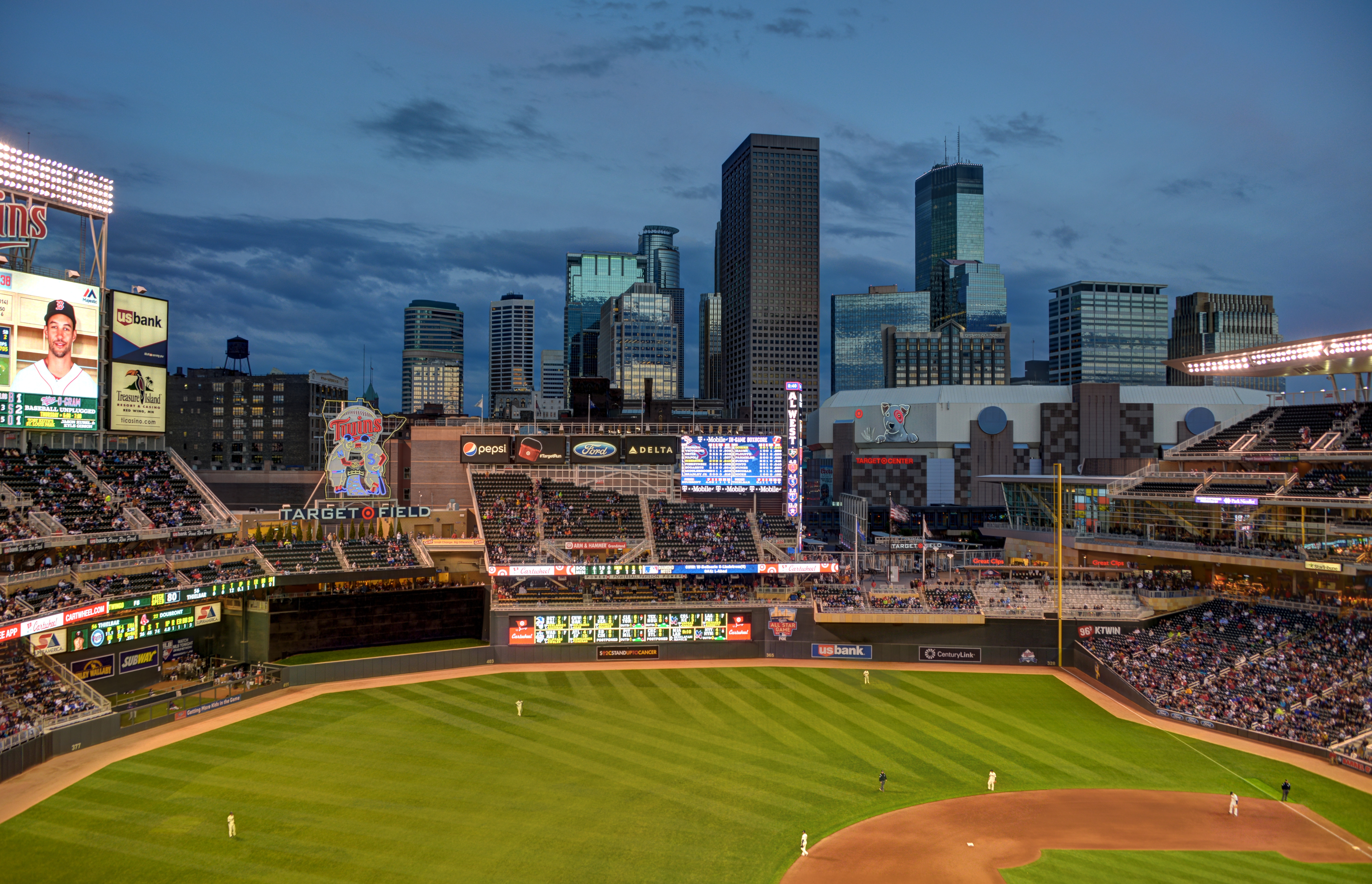
View of downtown Minneapolis from Target Field, May 14, 2014, with the Target Center in background

The architects tried to avoid creating a replica of the old-style brick Camden Yards or modern urban design of the new Nationals Park (both also designed by Populous). Instead, the design for the stadium employs local limestone, heated viewing areas and a heated field. The stadium does not have a roof, but there is a canopy above the top deck. The stadium is integrated with Target Field station, which is the north/western terminus of the Metro Blue and Green Line light rail services. It previously also served as the Minneapolis terminus of the Northstar commuter rail line from the northwest. Walter P Moore served as the structural engineer for the stadium and canopy.

The stadium does not have a retractable roof, though one was considered initially. Such a roof was cited to add $100 million to the total budget and none of the parties (Twins, Hennepin County, or Minnesota Legislature) were willing to pay for that cost. Much like other northern cities with outdoor professional baseball (i.e. Chicago, Detroit, Boston, Cleveland, New York), the weather in Minneapolis during a 162-game baseball season and playoffs can vary from early-spring snow to rain and hot, humid weather. The Metrodome was climate-controlled, and thus, protected the baseball schedule during the entire time that it had been the venue for the Minnesota Twins. However, many Twins fans and baseball purists argue that this same sterile, climate-controlled environment creates a less-than-desirable atmosphere for watching baseball. The architect also tested the feasibility of heated seats.

The site is about the same size as that of Fenway Park, and the ballpark holds roughly the same number of seats. The site is bounded by 3rd Avenue (southeast, right field, across from Target Center); 5th Street North (northeast, left field); 7th Street North (southwest, first base); Hennepin Environmental Recovery Center [garbage incinerator] and 6th Avenue North (northwest, third base). 3rd Avenue is a westbound one-way street which dips down under the right field seats and serves as a ramp to I-394 westbound. A separate, small westbound segment of 3rd Avenue, connecting 7th Street North with Glenwood Avenue, was renamed "Twins Way". The ballpark's street address, "1 Twins Way", is at the "foot" of the renamed street.

=== Construction ===
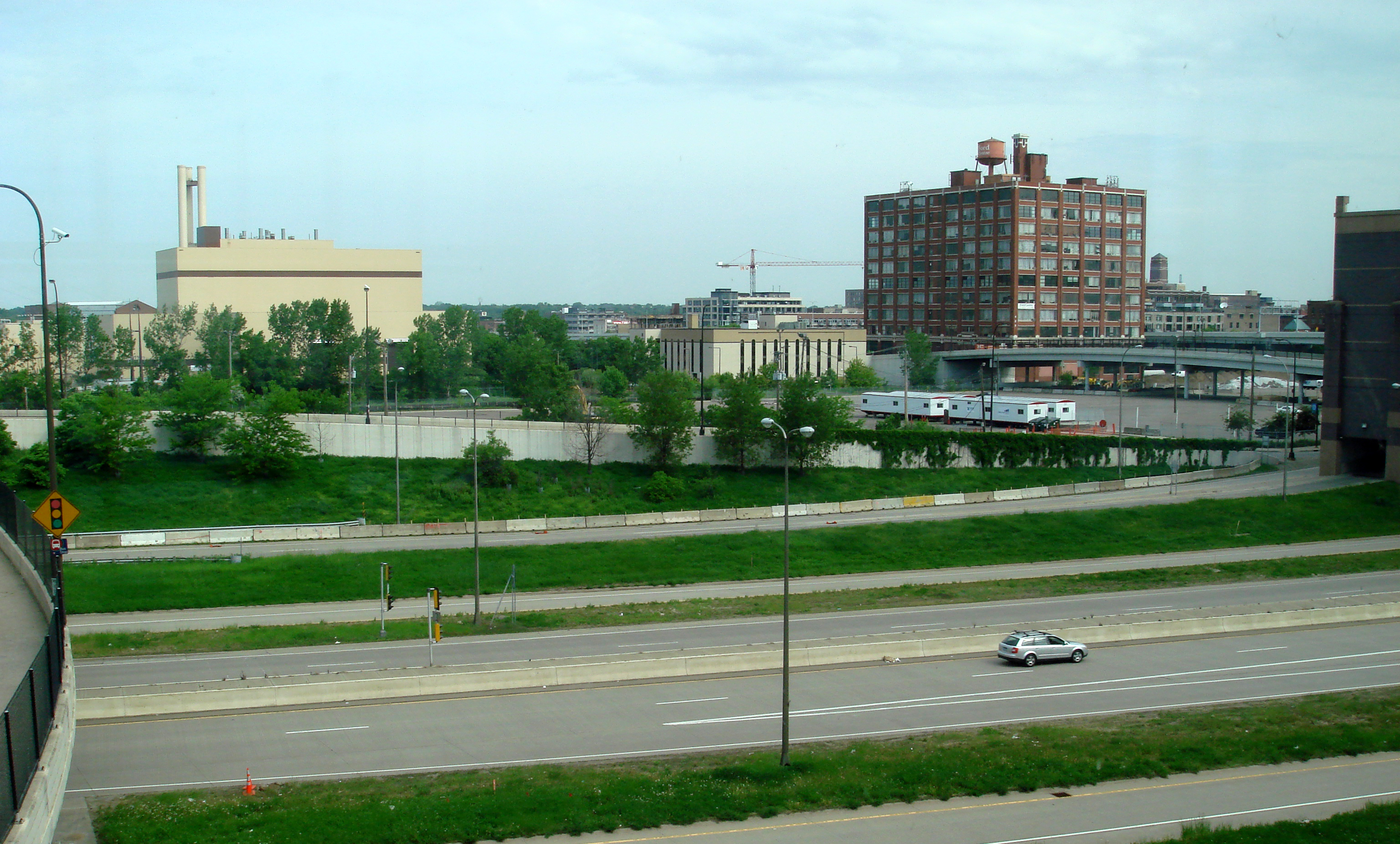
The site of Target Field, two days before construction commenced on May 21, 2007. The location is bordered by 7th St. N (overpass on left), the Hennepin Energy Recovery Center, 5th St. N (overpass on the right side), and the 394 exits and downtown parking ramp (foreground). The tall red building is the Ford Centre.

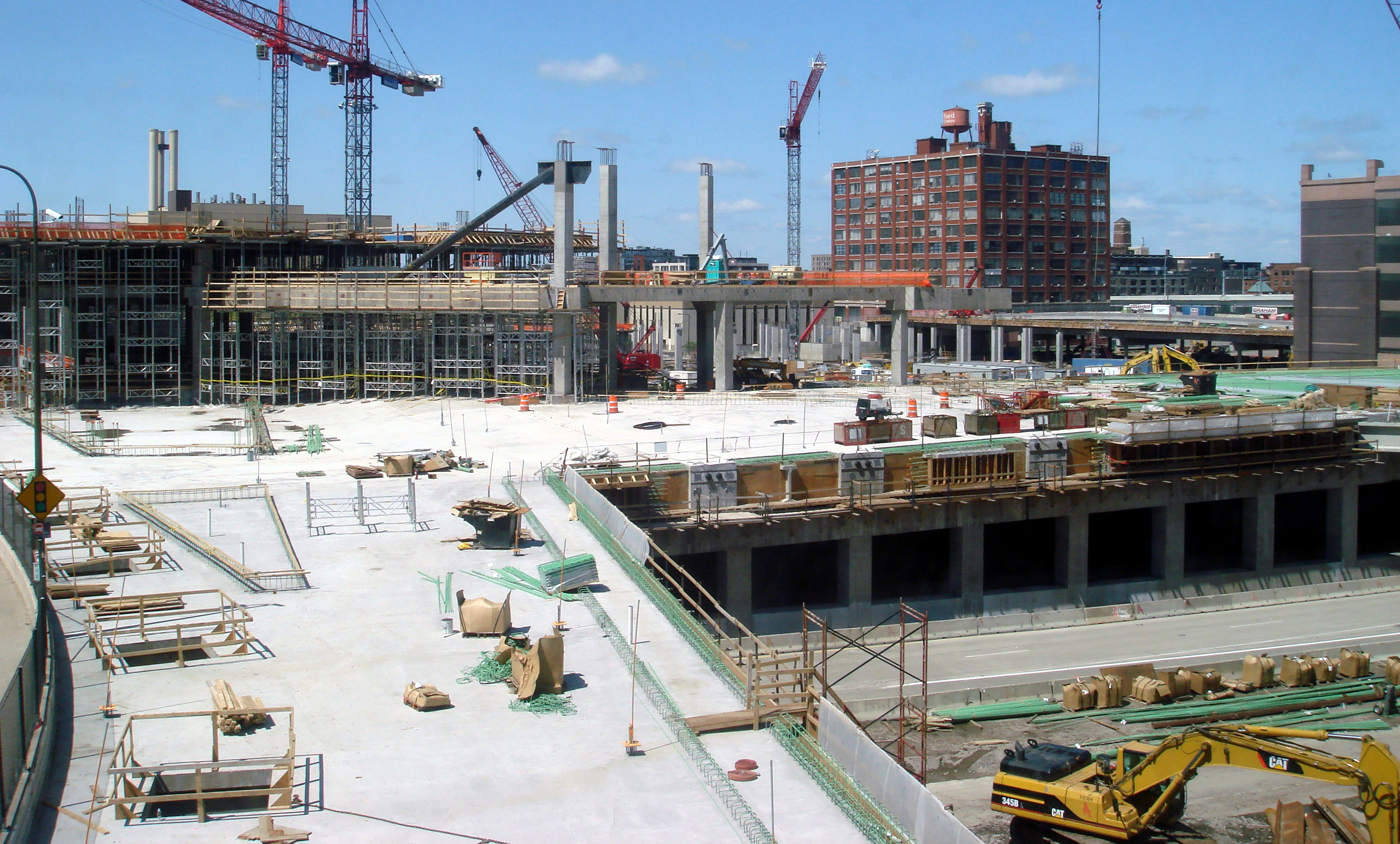
The same site as above, approximately one year later (357 days)

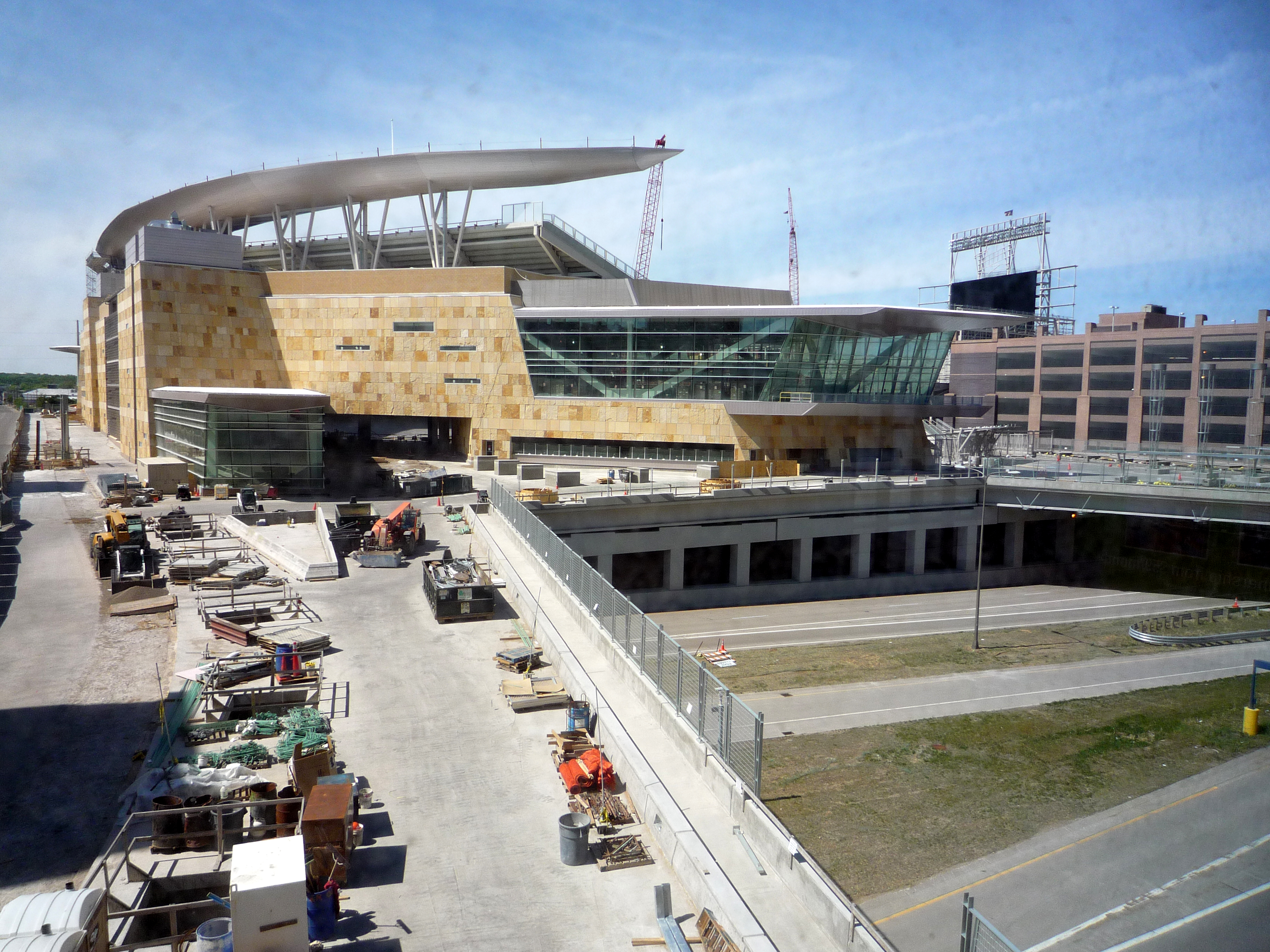
The same site as above, 378 days after the previous photo and approximately two years (733 days) since construction commenced

Mortenson Construction of Minneapolis built the stadium. Metropolitan Mechanical Contractors completed the mechanical contracting. Danny's Construction Company erected the structural steel. Subcontractors involved in the concrete work include CECO Concrete Construction, Gephart Electric, E&J Rebar, Ambassador Steel Corporation, Amsysco Inc., and Nordic Construction/Cemstone.

The first concrete slab was poured on December 17, 2007. The concrete portion of construction was completed in November 2008 with a roof deck pour for the Twins administration building. In March 2009 Tekna Kleen (commercial cleaning company), started doing the finishing cleaning touches to Target Field. In late August, 2009, the playing field was installed.

The Twins received the certificate of occupancy from Mortenson Construction on December 22, 2009. The Twins staff moved in on January 4, 2010.

=== LEED Certification ===
Target Field was initially awarded LEED Silver Certification by the U.S. Green Building Council, the second LEED-certified professional sports stadium in the United States, after Oracle Park. It is one of 3 baseball stadiums with LEED certification (the other being Nationals Park). In 2017, Target Field was recertified LEED Gold, the first sports site in the nation to be so designated.

=== Upgrades ===
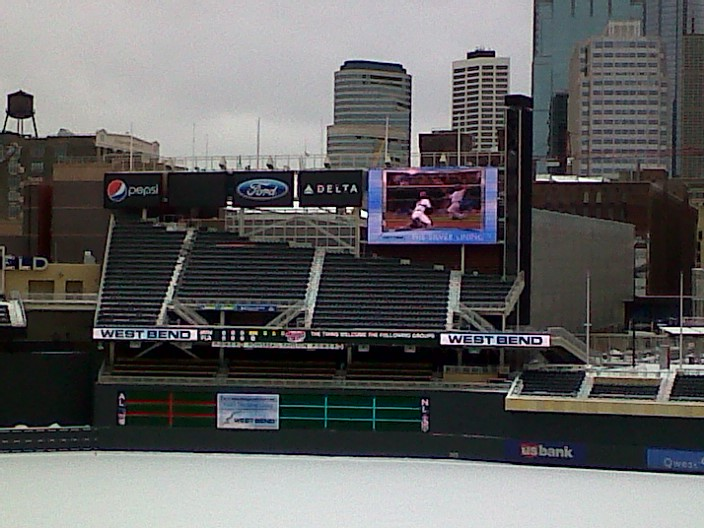
The right field scoreboard, photo taken March 2011.

On February 12, 2008, the Twins announced $22.4 million in upgrades to the original design, and increased the Twins ownership stake in the ballpark to $167.4 million, bringing the total ballpark cost to $412 million. The upgrades were mainly based around increasing fan experience and comfort. The upgrades included an enlarged canopy soffit (the largest in baseball), protecting fans further from the elements, in light of the stadium not having a roof. The Twins also upgraded the scoreboard – the fourth-largest in Major League Baseball – from standard definition to a high definition display from Daktronics measuring 101 feet (31 m) long and 57 feet (17 m) high. Other upgrades included warming shelters, changing 100,000 square feet (9,300 m^{2}) of the exterior surface to Kasota stone, and increasing the number of restrooms and concession areas. The park features a modernized version of the original "Minnie and Paul Shaking Hands" logo used on the team's original uniforms from 1961 until 1986 (the logo has also been on the home uniforms since 2001). When a Twins player hits a home run, the Minnie and Paul sign lights up with strobe lights surrounding the Minnesota state outline and Minnie and Paul shake hands, akin to the Liberty Bell used at Citizens Bank Park in Philadelphia. The original flagpole from Metropolitan Stadium – completely restored – is located on the right field plaza. The flagpole was located at the American Legion post in Richfield after Metropolitan Stadium's closing, and was donated back to the Twins by the Legion as a gesture of goodwill.

On November 10, 2010, the Twins announced a number of upgrades to Target Field, all of which were completed in time for the 2011 season. Highlights among the upgrades included a scoreboard in right-center field and the "Twins Tower" (a 100-foot (30 m) tall illuminated tower), next to the new scoreboard. Other changes include free Wi-Fi service for fans, expanded concession stand menus, and the addition of more radiant heaters and artwork around the ballpark. In total, the changes were expected to cost the Twins $4–6 million.

Additionally, the 14 black spruce trees located in the batter's eye were removed, following hitters' complaints that the trees interfered with the ability to see pitches as they would sometimes sway in the wind. The batter's eye wall itself was covered in a black material designed to reduce glare.

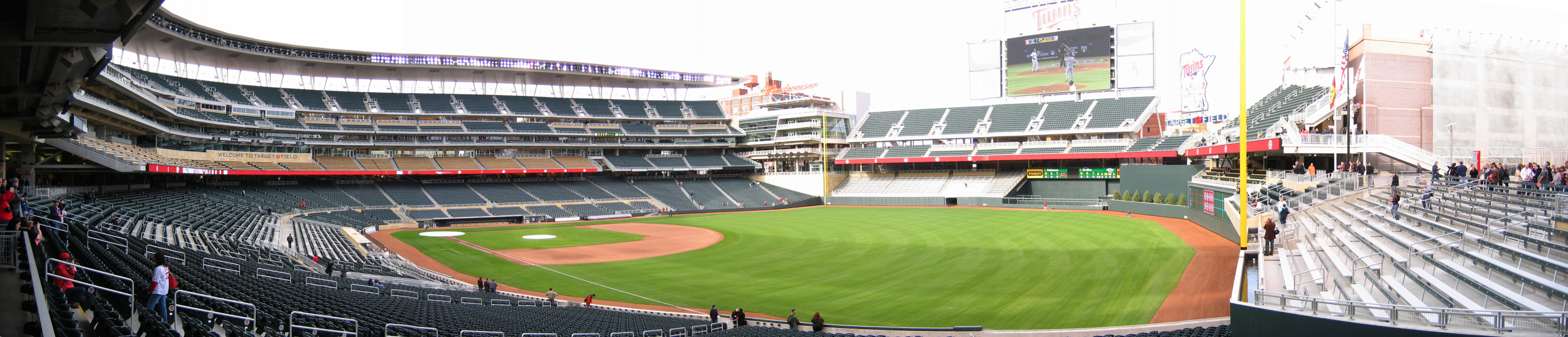
Panorama of Target Field, taken from the concourse inside Gate 29.

== Non-baseball events ==
=== Concerts ===
This is not a complete list of every concert hosted at Target Field.

Date	Artist	Opening act(s)	Tour / Concert name	Attendance	Revenue	Notes
July 8, 2012	Kenny Chesney; Tim McGraw	Grace Potter and the Nocturnals; Jake Owen	Brothers of the Sun Tour	42,524 / 42,524	$4,483,461	Tickets sold out in four hours
July 12, 2013	Kenny Chesney; Zac Brown Band	Eli Young Band; Kacey Musgraves	No Shoes Nation Tour	43,940 / 43,940	$4,979,216	
August 2, 2014	Paul McCartney	—	Out There Tour	43,143 / 43,143	$4,949,623	Dropped a possible concert at the stadium in 2011 due to scheduling conflicts. It was his fifth solo concert in Minnesota, which managed to encompass all the Twins' ballparks, given McCartney performed in the Metrodome in 1993 as well as Metropolitan Stadium with The Beatles in 1965. Tickets were sold out in 20 minutes.
July 18–19, 2015	Kenny Chesney; Jason Aldean	Brantley Gilbert; Cole Swindell; Old Dominion	The Big Revival Tour	84,479 / 84,479	$7,816,355	
May 28, 2016	Zac Brown Band	Drake White & The Big Fire	Black Out the Sun Tour	28,839 / 39,077	$2,330,737	
July 28, 2017	Billy Joel	Gavin DeGraw	Billy Joel in Concert	38,964 / 38,964	$4,753,087	
July 29, 2017	Florida Georgia Line	Backstreet Boys; Nelly; Chris Lane	Smooth Tour	37,592 / 37,592	$3,109,656	
June 30, 2018	Eagles	Jimmy Buffett	An Evening with the Eagles 2018	42,185 / 42,185	TBA	
July 21, 2018	Luke Bryan	Sam Hunt; Jon Pardi; Morgan Wallen	What Makes You Country Tour	36,078 / 36,385	$2,921,581	
July 27, 2018	Def Leppard; Journey	Cheap Trick	Def Leppard & Journey 2018 Tour	37,960 / 37,960	$3,333,263	
August 10, 2018	Zac Brown Band	OneRepublic	Down the Rabbit Hole Live	TBA	TBA	
August 23, 2021	Green Day; Fall Out Boy; Weezer	The Interrupters	Hella Mega Tour	36,520 / 36,520	$3,702,376	Originally scheduled for August 11, 2020.
July 14, 2023	The Killers; Death Cab for Cutie; The Flaming Lips	Cannons, Yam Haus	TC Summerfest	TBD / 36,520		
July 15, 2023	Imagine Dragons; AJR; Chelsea Cutler	Em Beihold, Talk	TC Summerfest	TBD / 36,520		
August 10, 2023	P!nk	Pat Benatar Neil Giraldo Grouplove	Summer Carnival Tour	TBD / 36,520		Biggest single-day attendance (44,152+)
July 28, 2024	Foo Fighters	The Pretenders L7	Everything or Nothing At All	TBD / 36,520		
August 17, 2024	Green Day; The Smashing Pumpkins	Rancid; The Linda Lindas	The Saviors Tour			
August 19, 2024	Def Leppard; Journey	Steve Miller Band	The Summer Stadium Tour			
August 5, 2026	Noah Kahan	Gigi Perez Annabelle Dinda	The Great Divide Tour			
August 23, 2026	Tim McGraw	The Chicks, Lady A, 49 Winchester, Timothy Wayne	Pawn Shop Guitar Tour			
August 24, 2026	My Chemical Romance	Sleater-Kinney	The Black Parade 2026			

Skyline Music Festival

In 2013, Target Field hosted its first music festival, the Skyline Music Festival, named so because its seating, with only the seats around third base in an amphitheatre-like manner, allows for extensive views of the Minneapolis skyline. The inaugural edition was held on July 26, 2013, featuring three of four bands in a package tour – Soul Asylum, Matthew Sweet and Big Head Todd and the Monsters, each of whom played one of their past albums in their entirety – along with Minnesota band Gear Daddies. The 6,752 tickets allowed by the section were sold out. The 2014 edition was extended to two nights. August 8 featured an indie rock night sponsored by KCMP, featuring Andrew Bird, The New Pornographers, Thao and the Get Down Stay Down, S. Carey and Dosh. The following night was headlined by Melissa Etheridge, accompanied by the returning Gear Daddies, along with The Honeydogs, O.A.R. and The Rembrandts. Attendance was 2,500 for the first night and 5,500 for the second.

Concerts During Games

In 2014, pop rock group Panic! At The Disco performed on the field during the 2014 All Star Game.

In 2022, country music star Thomas Rhett performed a short set during the NHL Winter Classic. He performed in –5-degree weather, quite possibly the coldest concert in Minnesota history.

Beginning in 2022, post-game concerts would take place on the field. The first being Cole Swindell on August 4. In 2023, postgame concerts included T-Pain on June 15 and Carly Pearce on August 24. Flo Rida performed a post-game concert in 2024. 2025's concerts feature Nelly on July 11 and Chris Young on September 13.

=== College football ===
Date	Winning Team	Result	Losing Team	Attendance
September 23, 2017	University of St. Thomas	20-17	St. John's (MN)	37,355
August 31, 2019	North Dakota State	57-10	Butler	34,544
September 16, 2023	South Dakota State	70-7	Drake	18,174

=== Soccer ===
Date	Winning Team	Result	Losing Team	Tournament	Spectators
June 25, 2016	(Mexico) Club León	4-2	(United States) Minnesota United FC	Club Friendly	18,505

=== Hockey ===
Target Field was scheduled to host the 2021 NHL Winter Classic on January 1, 2021, but the event was postponed due to the COVID-19 pandemic. The 2022 NHL Winter Classic was held at the stadium on January 1, 2022. The St. Louis Blues defeated the Minnesota Wild 6-4. During the game, the temperature recorded was a high -3 degrees to a low -9.

== Features ==
=== The stadium ===
- The popular left-field Budweiser roof deck features mostly standing room and the only bonfire in the Majors.
- The bullpens are "double-decker" style in left-center field. The Twins' pen is farthest from the field, with the opposing team's pen below it, closest to the field.
- The batter's eye featured 14 young black spruce trees (each about 6 feet high) the first year. After criticism from Twins and opposing players concerning the shadows that they cast, the trees were removed prior to the second year. Some were auctioned to fans and ticket holders while the rest were donated to Minnesota state parks.
- Kasota limestone is used in much of the stadium and is from Kasota, near Mankato.
- The admission gates are numbered according to former Twins legends and roughly located near to the positions that they played;
  - Left field gate is #6 honoring Tony Oliva (with his bronze statue nearby)
  - Centerfield gate is #3 for Harmon Killebrew
  - Target Plaza gate (in right field) is #34 in tribute to Kirby Puckett
  - Right field gate is #29 in tribute to Rod Carew
  - Home plate gate is #14 in honor of Kent Hrbek (featuring his bronze statue)

=== Target Plaza ===
Target Plaza is the gathering area behind the right field gate (Gate 34). On the wall of the adjacent parking garage facing the ballpark is a wind veil that makes waves as the wind blows. At night, color-changing lights add to the effect. Near the wind veil there are nine topiary frames each 40 feet (12 m) high shaped like baseball bats with hops growing on them. They are lit up every night with the same color changing scheme as the veil, however, during games they are lit up red, in sequential order, to denote the current inning. In this plaza are statues of former players Kirby Puckett, Rod Carew, Kent Hrbek and Harmon Killebrew, as well as former owner Carl Pohlad, his wife Eloise Pohlad, and Twins mascot TC Bear. Following protests over the murder of George Floyd, a statue of former owner Calvin Griffith was removed in June 2020 because of his history of racist comments.

A large "Golden Glove" sits in the plaza in recognition of all Twins players to win the Gold Glove Award. The statue can be sat on and is a popular photo attraction. It is located exactly 520 feet (160 m) from home plate, the distance of Harmon Killebrew's longest home run at Met Stadium (although his was hit into the left field upper deck).

There is also a monument that shows all the venues that Minnesota-based baseball teams played in. On the rails of the pedestrian skybridge are pennants that contain the rosters of all the Twins teams, and pennants of players, coaches, front office people, and other contributors who have been elected to the Twins Hall of Fame.

=== The field ===
The main flagpoles are in right field near the Plaza. The largest pole, which flies the American Flag and POW/MIA Flag, is the original pole used at Metropolitan Stadium. It was relocated to the Richfield Legion Post 435 after the Met was demolished, and, after being cut in half and refurbished, was re-installed for baseball at Target Field. The first flags—both US and POW/MIA—donated by Post 435 were raised at the first Twins exhibition game by veteran and flagpole historian B.W. McEvers of Bloomington. On September 6, Jim Thome hit a solo home run against the Kansas City Royals that hit the flag pole.

The championship banners fly on small flagpoles located on the upper rim of the stadium beyond left field. Each pole recognizes each division, league, and world championship since the team's arrival in 1961. On the stadium's upper rim in right-center field are small flagpoles that fly the flag for all the teams (including the Twins) in the division. The order that the flags fly are determined by the divisional standings.

Home plate is the same one used at the Metrodome. After the Twins' final dome game (Game 3 of the 2009 ALDS), the plate was dug up and later installed at Target Field. In addition, several handfuls of dirt were taken from the sliding pit and pitcher's mound areas from the Metrodome and scattered near their counterparts at Target Field. The diamond is aligned east (home plate to center field) at an approximate elevation of 850 feet (260 m) above sea level.

=== Twins bars and restaurants ===
At Target Field, there are four prominent bars and restaurants:

- The Town Ball Tavern is located on the upper concourse by the left field corner, and is famous for serving the Jucy Lucy burger. The wood flooring is the same used on the basketball court at the Minneapolis Armory during the NBA Minneapolis Lakers stay, before leaving for Los Angeles.
- Hrbek's is located on the main concourse behind home plate, and is named after former Twins first baseman Kent Hrbek.
- There are two bars located on the upper concourse behind home plate, collectively called the Two Gingers Pubs. In one of these bars, fans can watch the Target Field organist, Sue Nelson, perform during games. Out of these three bars and restaurants, the Two Gingers Pub (formerly known as the Twins Pub) is the only one that does not serve food, however it is the only one in which the field is visible from inside.
- The former Metropolitan Club (reserved for season ticket holders) was renovated prior to the 2019 season as restaurant Bat & Barrel, along with expansion of Target Plaza by moving Gate 34 further toward 1st Ave.

Concessions throughout also include several Minnesota favorites like walleye, wild rice soup, Kramarczuk's sausages, as well as a "State Fair Foods" stand where many items are served "on a stick", such as the J.D. Hoyt's pork chop. Target Field sells Killebrew Root Beer at concessions locations in cans and in root beer floats.

In 2018, PETA declared Target Field number one on its annual list of vegan-friendly ballparks, thanks to the availability of foods like tofu vindaloo, vegan Sriracha Brats and Italian Sausages, Daiya cheese pizza, and Field Roast burgers and dogs. In 2026, Target Field was ranked fourth among MLB ballparks for the 9-9-9 challenge in a Bovada Sportsbook analysis.

=== Minnie and Paul logo ===
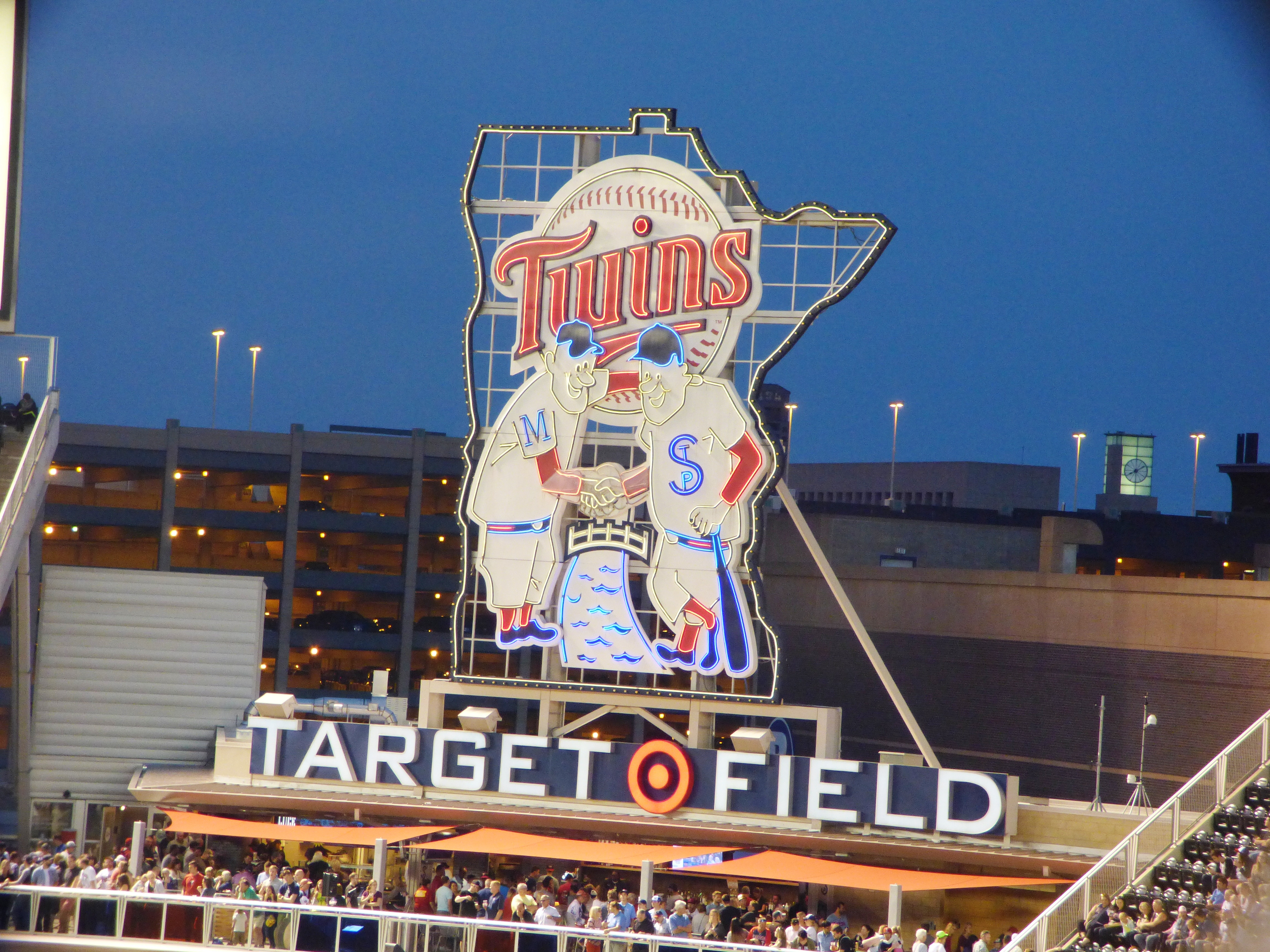
Minnie and Paul, representing the Twin Cities, is the logo for the Minnesota Twins.

The large original version of the Twins' original "Minnie and Paul" logo (designed by local artist, Ray Barton) stands in center field. It shows two players wearing the uniforms of the two minor-league teams that played in the Twin Cities before the Twins' arrival, the Minneapolis Millers and St. Paul Saints, shaking hands across the Mississippi River. During various points in the game, the strobe lights surrounding the logo flash. This sign was a concept designed and illustrated by RipBang Studios but built by others.

When the Twins score a run by any means other than a home run, the strobe lights trace the border from the bottom-left corner for each Twins player that crosses home plate, symbolizing that a Twins player rounded the bases. For each strikeout, the corners of the sign flash to portray the strike zone. The strobe lights will flash at the end of the top of an inning if the Twins do not surrender a run during the inning. After a Twins home run, the strobe lights flash, Minnie and Paul shake hands, and the Mississippi River flows. After a Twins victory, the "T" and "s" in "Twins" will blink to show the message "Twins win" in addition to the animation shown following a Twins home run. The Sign was updated for the 2023 season now including more LED lights with "Twins Win" being the words above Minnie and Paul. Minnie and Paul's hands physically shake up and down as well instead of the use of neon lights.

== METRO connections ==
The stadium is well-connected to the city's transit network, being immediately adjacent to the "A" and "B" parking ramps of the large ABC Ramps complex at the end of Interstate 394, which include two major transit bus terminals and link to the rest of downtown Minneapolis via skyway. Over 8,000 people typically arrive to each game via the Metro Blue Line and Metro Green Line, both of which terminate at Target Field Station, just 10 yards from the park's Gate 6.

== Park firsts ==
The first "soft event" at Target Field was an open house held for season ticket holders on March 20 and 21, 2010.

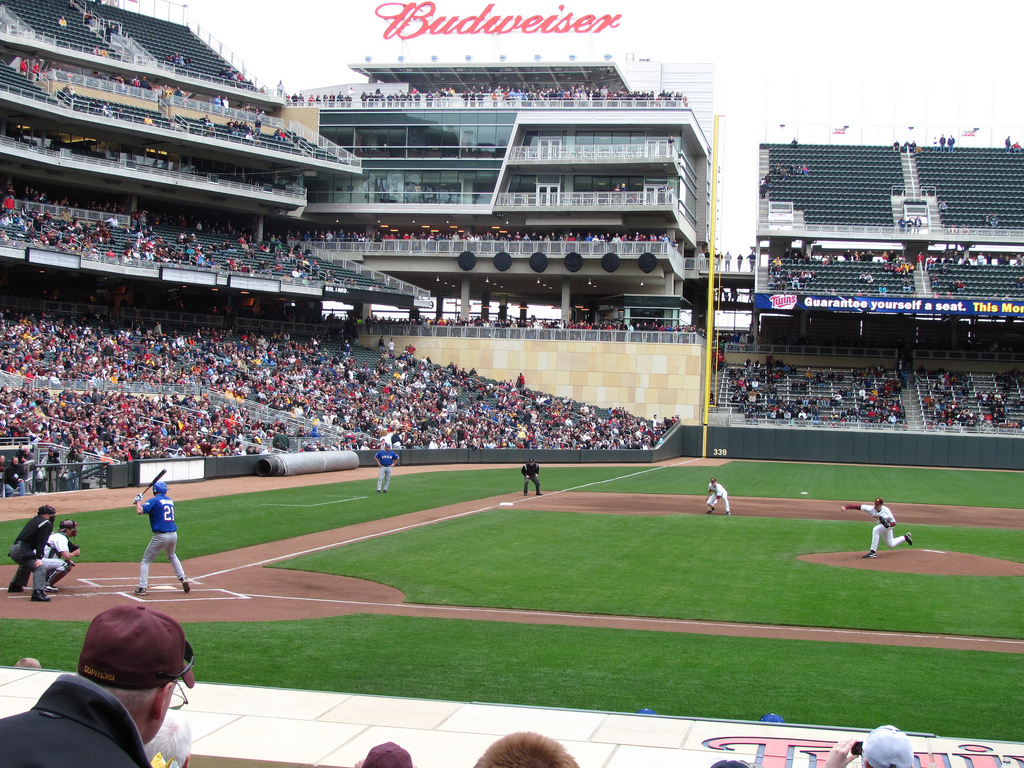
First Pitch at Target Field, thrown by Jordan, Minnesota native T.J. Oakes of the University of Minnesota Golden Gophers on March 27, 2010.

The first baseball game at the new ballpark took place on March 27, 2010, with a college baseball game between the University of Minnesota and Louisiana Tech attended by 37,757 fans.

The Twins played two preseason games against the St. Louis Cardinals on April 2 and 3, while the stadium's inaugural regular season game was on April 12, 2010 against the Red Sox.

=== Opening day (April 12, 2010) ===
Statistic	Player(s)/Team
Score	Minnesota Twins 5, Boston Red Sox 2
First Pitch	Carl Pavano (Twins)
First Batter	Marco Scutaro (Red Sox)
First Hit	Marco Scutaro (Red Sox)
First Double	Dustin Pedroia (Red Sox)
First Triple	Justin Morneau (Twins)
First Run	Denard Span (Twins)
First RBI(s)	Michael Cuddyer (Twins)
First Strikeout	David Ortiz (Red Sox) by Carl Pavano (Twins)
First Home Run	Jason Kubel (Twins) (off Scott Atchison, Red Sox, bottom 7th)
First Twins Batter	Denard Span
First Stolen Base	Denard Span (Twins)
First Double Play	4-6-3: Orlando Hudson to J. J. Hardy to Justin Morneau (Twins)
First Win	Carl Pavano (Twins)
First Save	Jon Rauch (Twins)
First Loss	Jon Lester (Red Sox)
First Walk	Denard Span (Twins)

=== Other firsts ===
Statistic	Date
First Pinch-Hitter	Jim Thome (Twins) April 14, 2010 vs. Boston Red Sox
Suspended Game	May 25, 2010 vs. New York Yankees
Inside The Park Home Run	August 21, 2011 vs. New York Yankees by Curtis Granderson
Twins Grand Slam	September 27, 2011 vs. Kansas City Royals by Rene Tosoni
Rainout	May 7, 2010 (scheduled vs. Baltimore Orioles)
Doubleheader	May 8, 2010 (Day-Night DH vs. Orioles)
Extra Inning Game	May 22, 2010 vs. Milwaukee Brewers (12 innings)
Walk-Off Hit	July 18, 2010 vs. Chicago White Sox by Delmon Young
Walk-Off Home Run	August 17, 2010 vs. Chicago White Sox by Jim Thome
Postseason Game	October 6, 2010 vs. New York Yankees
All-Star Game Hosted	July 15, 2014 – National League @ American League
Soccer Match Hosted	June 25, 2016 – Minnesota United FC vs Club León
Football Game Hosted	September 23, 2017 – St. Thomas Tommies vs St. John's Johnnies
Walk-off Grand Slam	July 15, 2018 vs. Tampa Bay Rays by Brian Dozier
Cycle	July 12, 2025 vs. Pittsburgh Pirates by Byron Buxton

== Comparison to the Metrodome ==
Characteristic	Target Field	H.H.H. Metrodome
Seats	38,544*	46,564**
Lower Deck Seats	19,000	21,621
Private Suites	54	115***
Group Party Suites	12	1
Club Level Seats	7,000	—
Upper Deck Seats	13,468	28,779
Disabled Seating	820	190
Lower/Club Seats between 1st and 3rd Base	about 12,037	6,679
Outfield Seats	about 6,748	18,594
Seats with Obstructed Views	< 200	1,392
Main Concourse	40 feet (12 m), open to field	22 feet (6.7 m), closed to field
Total Restrooms	34	16

*This is the official capacity. However, Standing Room Only (SRO) tickets are available that can increase this capacity by approximately 2,500+.
**6,000 seats were covered by a curtain; these and others made the stadium expandable to 55,883 during baseball playoffs and certain games in the last homestand and one-game playoff in October 2009.
***Controlled by the Minnesota Vikings football team.

Field dimensions are roughly comparable, with the left field area being a few feet closer to the plate, and the center field area being bounded by a 45° facet instead of a quarter-circle.

The Twins' previous homes in the Twin Cities, Metropolitan Stadium and the Metrodome, were friendly to hitters. The team intended to build Target Field as a "neutral" park, favoring neither hitters nor pitchers. However, following the 2010 regular season, statistics seemed to show that the park played more to the favor of pitchers than hitters. It became known as a "pitcher's park" in that it is difficult for batters to hit home runs and the pitcher has an advantage. Twins star Justin Morneau spoke for many of the players' concerns by calling "right-center to left-center... ridiculous" and that it is "almost impossible for a right-handed hitter to [homer to the] opposite field and very difficult for lefties". Since 2010, further studies indicated both the Twins and their opponents fared much better in other offensive categories in spite of the lack of home runs and runs scored. Target Field doesn't come off as being primarily a pitcher's park anymore. In particular, the low left-field wall is an attractive target for right-handed power hitters; however the high wall in right field still converts many hits that would be home runs in other parks into long doubles and loud singles.

== See also ==
- List of NCAA Division I baseball venues

Events and tenants
Preceded by Hubert H. Humphrey Metrodome	Home of the Minnesota Twins; 2010 – present	Succeeded by Current
Preceded by Citi Field	Host of the Major League Baseball All-Star Game; 2014	Succeeded by Great American Ball Park
Preceded by Cotton Bowl	Host of the NHL Winter Classic; 2021	Succeeded by Fenway Park
