= Theatre de la Jeune Lune =

Theater company based in Minneapolis, Minnesota

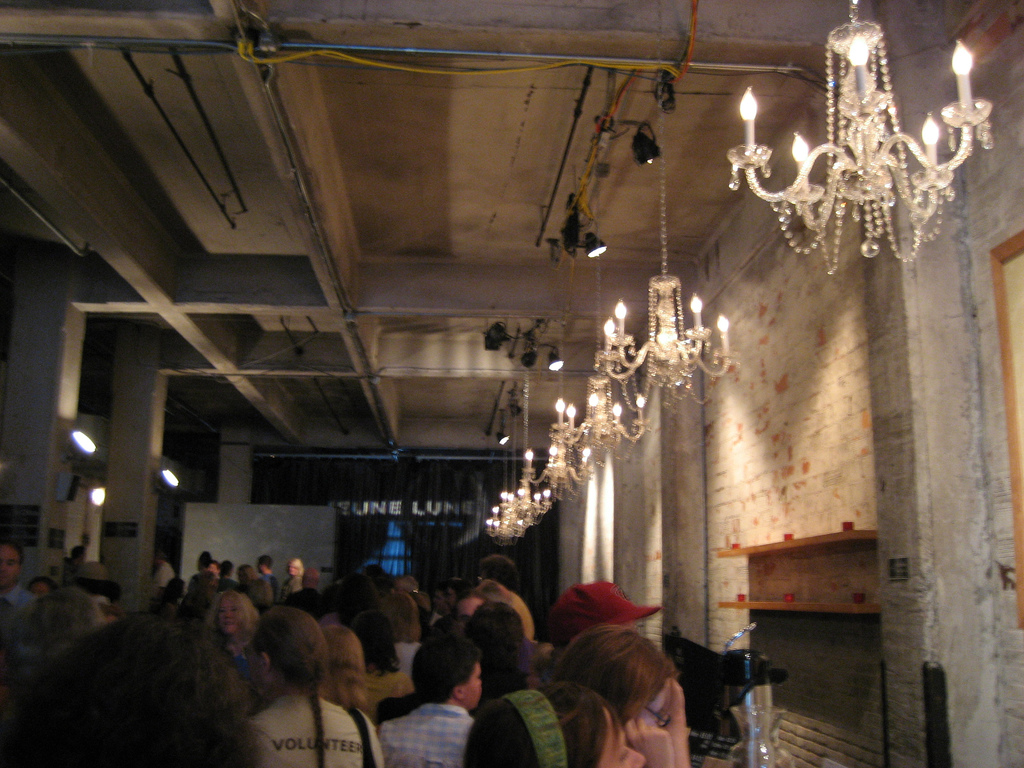
The interior of the building

The Theatre de la Jeune Lune was a celebrated theater company based in Minneapolis, Minnesota. The company, in operation from 1978 to 2008, was known for its visually rich, highly physical style of theatre, derived from clown, mime, dance and opera. The theatre's reputation also stemmed from their reinvented classics and their productions of highly ambitious original work.

== History ==
Theatre de la Jeune Lune (French for Theater of the New Moon) was founded in France in 1978 by Dominique Serrand, Vincent Gracieux and Barbra Berlovitz, who were later joined by Robert Rosen, all graduates of the École Internationale de Théâtre Jacques Lecoq school in Paris. Actors Steven Epp,Christopher Bayes and Felicity Jones joined Jeune Lune in 1983. Bayes left the company in 1989. The company's name was inspired by the verses of a poem by Bertolt Brecht which reads, "As the people say, at the moon's change of phases / The new moon holds for one night long / The old moon in its arms". Serrand recalls starting the company as being "complete chaos, and that's what was great... We wanted to change theater but we didn't have a clue how to do it."

For the first years of operation, Jeune Lune split its time between performing between Paris and in Minneapolis. The company permanently settled in Minneapolis in 1985 and, in 1992, moved into the renovated Allied Van Lines building in Minneapolis' Warehouse District. In 2001, the five original members officially took on duties as co-artistic directors. This collaborative style of direction made it possible for everyone to have an equal say of what goes onstage.

They were very well known for their theatrical trademark of incorporating what they learned under Jacques Lecoq into the works of Moliere, Shakespeare and D’Artagnan. They would also use a rather inventive style of mise en scene in shows, as well as comedic acting very similar to Charlie Chaplin, Marcel Marceau and Commedia dell’arte. Epp explained their approach for producing shows saying, "We dissect the body in its movement, power and playfulness, and glean from that ways to apply that physicality to whatever material we're working with, to galvanize the role and find what's pertinent to a contemporary audience."

Jeune Lune was highly notable for its productions of original works. Their most notable example was in 1992, when the company wrote and produced a Brecht stylized play titled "Children of Paradise: Shooting a Dream". The show is a fictionalized portrayal of the making of the acclaimed French film, Les Enfants du Paradis. The team used Brecht's trademark of episodic style in plays by doubling the actions from the film's setting in the 1830s and the shooting of the movie in the 1940s. The audience was also encouraged to participate in the show as they were seated directly on the stage for the prologue, serving as witnesses to the events portrayed in the movie. This was done to represent the mixed ambiguity of the film's meaning that the public felt upon release, leaving it to the spectators to decide its moral message. The production was met with critical praise, going on to win the American Theatre Critics Association's award for best new play.

In 2005, the Theatre de la Jeune Lune was awarded the Regional Theatre Tony Award. They have also received international praise when both Serrand and Gracieux were knighted by the French government for their contributions to the country's culture. However, despite critical acclaim, the company struggled in its later years to find an audience.

By 2007, the company faced a crisis. Four of the original five members had either left the company or stepped down from their co-artistic director positions, with Dominique Serrand remaining as the sole director. Over the years, the company had also accumulated a debt load exceeding $1 million, even as it attempted restructuring and budget cuts in order to remain solvent.

In June 2008, the Theatre de la Jeune Lune board of directors announced it would sell the theater building and "shut down the arts group as currently organized." Serrand said in a statement that the artists "are exploring ways to reinvent an agile, nomadic, entrepreneurial theatre with a new name" that will be "coming soon to a theatre near you." He mentioned his hopes for the closing to be viewed as a way of reflecting on what he sees as systemic problems with how art is funded in the United States.

Shortly after the closing, Dominique Serrand and Steven Epp began a collaboration with Nathan Keepers and Christina Baldwin, to open a new theatre in the area called "The Moving Company", where they continue to work as artistic directors.

The theatre now operates as a converted wedding venue under the name "Aria at the Jeune Lune."

A coverage of the activities of the group during the spring and summer of 1980 in Paris, when they were performing "Cirque de Molière", was produced by Ateliers Varan as "Le Théatre de la Jeune Lune", directed by Panamanian filmmaker Edgar Soberón Torchia. The film shows the group performing fragments of Molière's plays on the street at the Centre Georges Pompidou and on an improvised stage in a market place. The 13 minute-movie is part of the film archive of Ateliers Varan, founded by Jean Rouch.

== Shows ==
1978: A Midsummer Night's Dream
1979: Cirque de Molière; A French Christmas; Ubu for President
1980: 1929; Antoine et August; The Nitty Gritty; The Tinker's Dam
1982: Snow Business
1983: Heroes; The Caprices of Marianne; Goodbye Paradis Can-Can
1984: The Fantastic Adventures of the Count of St. Germain; The Kitchen; The Cloudkeeper
1985: Yang Zen Frogs; Lulu; The Bourgeois Gentleman; Christopher Columbus;
1986: Splendid; Place de Breteuil; August, August, August; Circus; Exit the King
1987: Romeo and Juliet; N'yawk, N'yawk, Who's There?; Lorenzaccio; Cafe Under the Earth
1988: Red Noses; The 7 Dwarves
1989: 1789: The French Revolution; Holiday in Kerflooey; Cyrano; The Force of Habit
1990: Some People's Kids; Il Campiello
1991: Puntilla and His Chauffeur Matti; Crusoe, Friday, and the Island of Hope; The Nightingale
1992: Children of Paradise — Shooting a Dream; The Ballroom
1993: Scapin; Le Creation du Monde; Facade; The Green Bird
1994: Germinal; Don Juan Giovanni; Conversations After Burial; The Juniper Tree
1995: Pelleas and Melisande; Yang Zen Froggs; The Hunchback of Notre-Dame
1996: Honeymoon China; The Impresario; The 3 Musketeers
1997: The Kitchen; The Pursuit of Happiness; Cinemamerica & LifeLiberty
1998: Twelfth Night; Red Harviest; ... Queen
1999: Cyrano; Tartuffe; The Golem; Furthest from the Sun
2000: The Magic Flute; The Government Inspector; Chez Pierre
2001: The Magic Flute; Gulliver, A Swift Journey; Hamlet; The Description of the World; The Green Bird
2002: Medea; Cosi fan Tutte; The Nuns
2003: The Seagull; Carmen; Figaro; The Man Who Laughs; Circus of Tales
2004: The Ballroom; The Golem; The Miser; Carmina Burana
2005: Maria de Buenos Aires; Antigone; Lettice and Lovage; The Little Prince; Tartuffe
2006: Amerika, or The Disappearance; Mefistofele; Tartuffe; The Miser
2007: The Deception; Don Juan Giovanni; Figaro
2008: Fishtank; Figaro
