= North Loop, Minneapolis =

North Loop Market Square, Market District
- Neighborhood
- Nickname: The Warehouse District
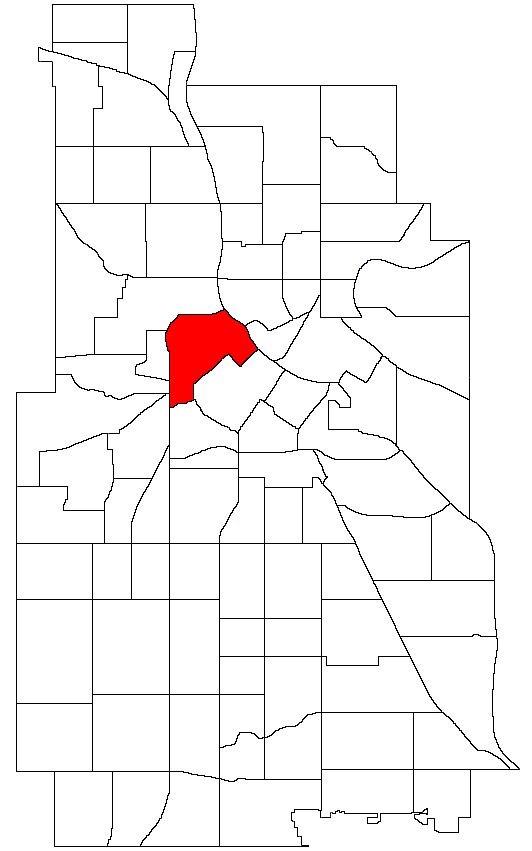
- Location of North Loop within the U.S. city of Minneapolis
- Interactive map of North Loop
- Country: United States
- State: Minnesota
- County: Hennepin
- City: Minneapolis
- Community: Central
- City Council Wards: 3, 5

Government
  - Council Member: Michael Rainville
  - Council Member: Pearll Warren

Area
  - Total: 0.837 sq mi (2.17 km^{2})

Population (2020)
  - Total: 7,540
  - Density: 9,010/sq mi (3,480/km^{2})
- Time zone: UTC-6 (CST)
  - Summer (DST): UTC-5 (CDT)
- ZIP code: 55401, 55403, 55405, 55411
- Area code: 612

Historical population
Census	Pop.	Note	%±
1980	338		—
1990	647		91.4%
2000	1,515		134.2%
2010	4,291		183.2%
2020	7,540		75.7%

The North Loop is a neighborhood in the Central community of Minneapolis.

Commonly referred to as The Warehouse District, the neighborhood was Minneapolis's main commercial district during the city's years as a midwestern shipping hub. Although only a little commercial shipping is still done in the neighborhood, the historic warehouses still dominate the neighborhood. Some of these buildings have been repurposed into restaurants, shops, and apartments.

The neighborhood features the Minneapolis Warehouse Historic District, which is listed on the National Register of Historic Places.

== Geography ==
The North Loop is located northwest of the central business district between downtown Minneapolis and the Mississippi River. Streets in the North Loop are oriented to be parallel to the river, which means that they run at a 45-degree angle relative to the grid of the rest of the city. It is split between wards 3 and 5 of the Minneapolis City Council, currently represented by Michael Rainville and Pearll Warren, respectively. It also sits in state legislative district 59B.

Although the neighborhood technically extends further to the south, the main residential and commercial area of the North Loop is roughly a rectangle bounded by the railroad tracks as Cedar Lake Trail (in the southeast), Plymouth Avenue (in the northwest), the elevated 4th street freeway entrance/exit in the southwest, and the Mississippi River in the northeast. Washington Avenue is the main thoroughfare through the neighborhood.

The James I. Rice Park, which is in the northeast portion of the neighborhood along the river, is popular with residents during the summer months. The bike trail and West River Parkway that runs through the park are part of the Grand Rounds Scenic Byway. The park added a playground in 2010 located where 4th Ave North intersects with West River Parkway.

== History ==
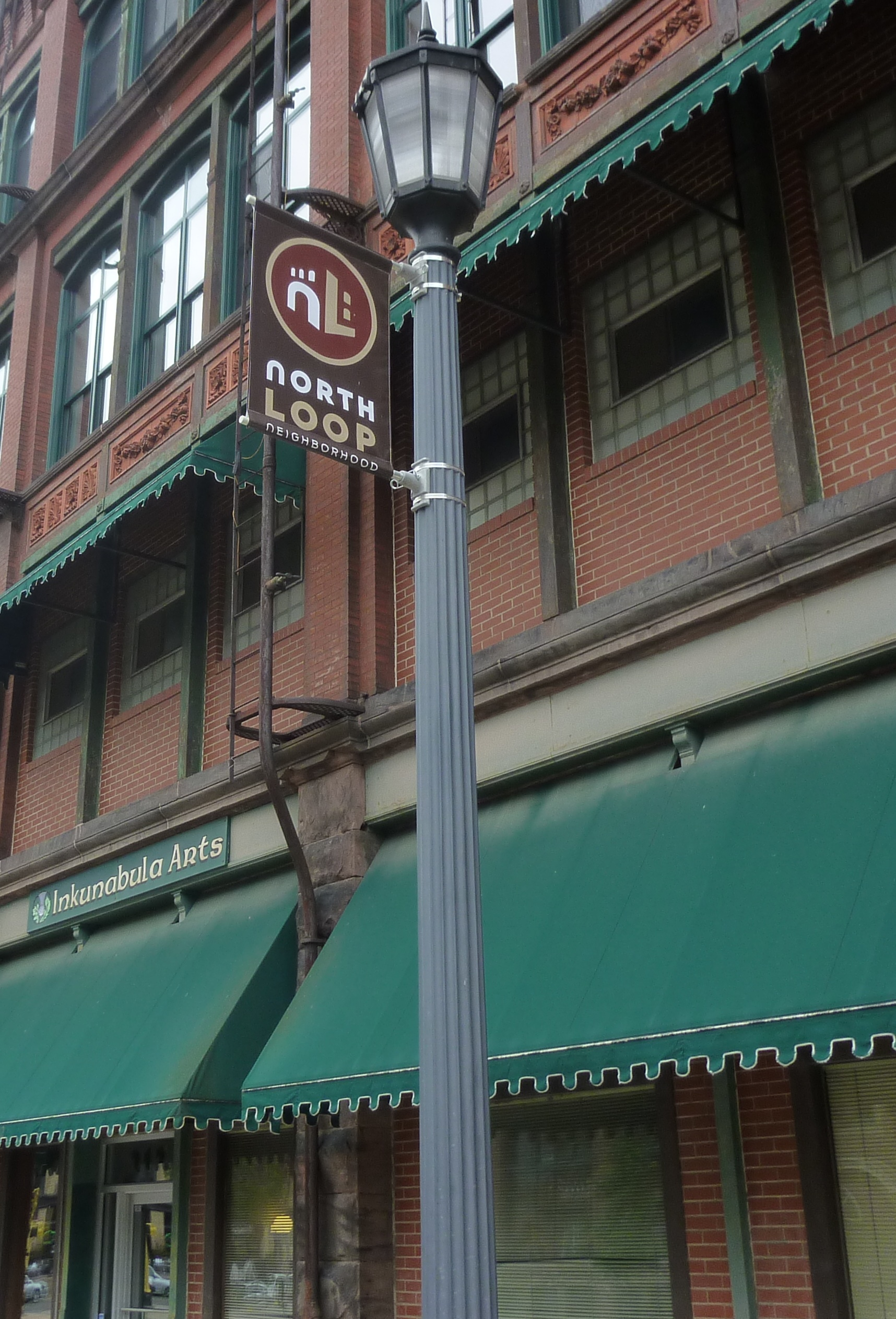
Inkunabula Arts, an example of a building spared demolition

- Minneapolis Warehouse Historic District
- U.S. National Register of Historic Places
- U.S. Historic district
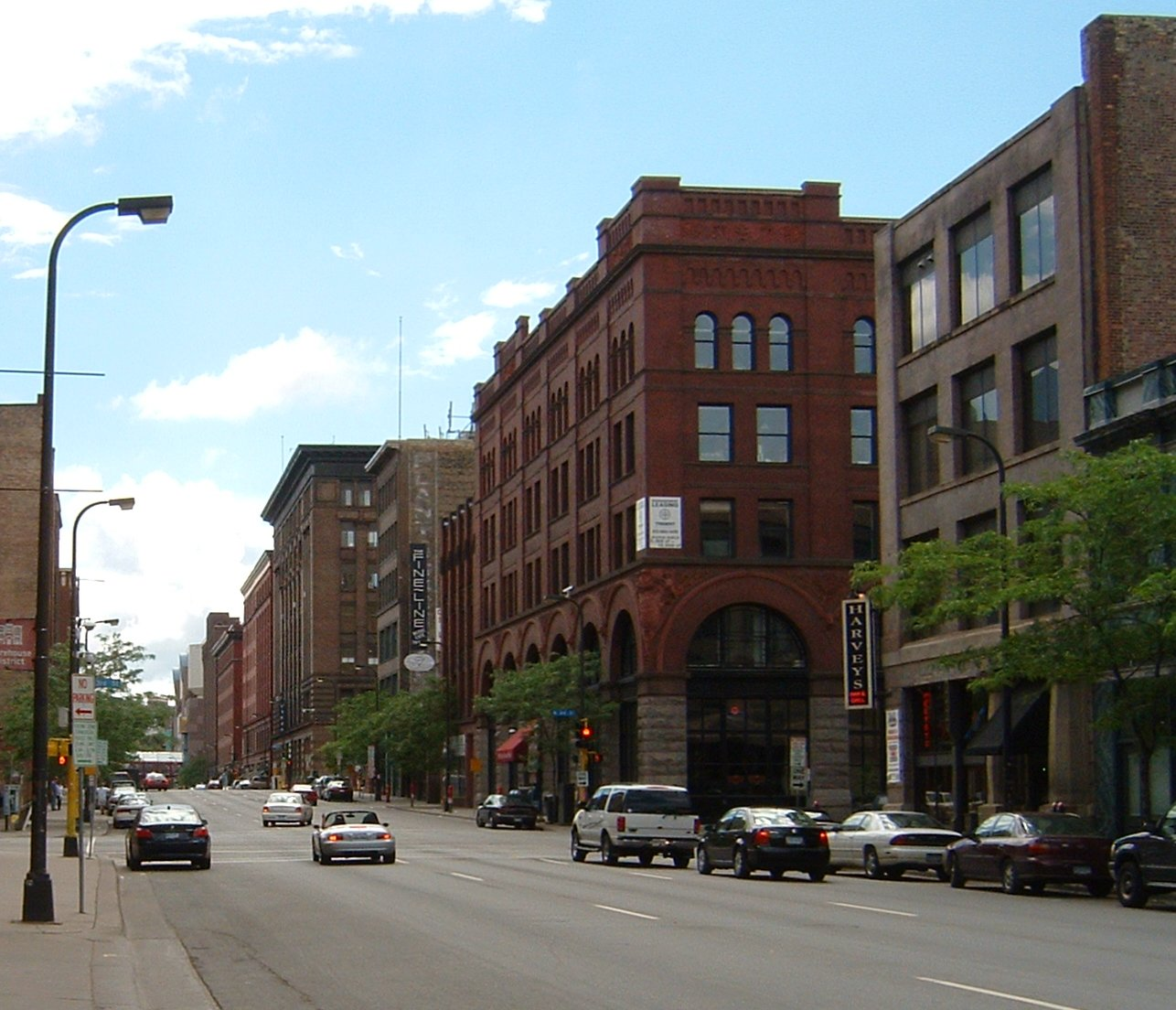
- A look down First Avenue in the Warehouse District.

- Location within Minnesota Location within the United States
- Location: Minneapolis, Minnesota
- Coordinates: 44°59′13″N 93°16′35″W
- Architect: Multiple
- Architectural style: Classical Revival, Other, Romanesque
- NRHP reference No.: 89001937
- Added to NRHP: November 3, 1989

For most of its history, the North Loop was an industrial area. It was home to a large railroad yard and numerous warehouses and factories. Much of the warehouse district (very roughly bounded by Second Street North, First Avenue North, Sixth Street North, and the BNSF Railway tracks, except for the Interstate 394 and Interstate 94 ramps) is listed on the National Register of Historic Places.

The warehouses that characterize the district are mostly six to eight stories high, and about 62 structures on seven square blocks contribute to the district. The predominant form of design is the Chicago Commercial style, but many other styles were built, including Italianate, Queen Anne style, Richardsonian Romanesque, Classical Revival, and early 20th century commercial styles. The warehouse district was in turn associated with the railroad transportation network that was under development at the time, which connected Minneapolis with the rest of the Midwest and the rest of the country. These warehouses were used for wholesale and storage of goods related to milling and manufacturing. The nomination for the National Register of Historic Places states that the district, as a whole, comprises a cohesive district of buildings with a common physical appearance, as well as a common age and original use.

In July 1969, at the 600 block of Second Avenue North, the Locker Room, one of the first gay bathhouses in Minneapolis opened, attracting gay men locally and from neighboring states. The site was used as a commercial sex establishment, but also for testing for HIV and other sexually transmitted infections. The bathhouse was a safe space in Minneapolis, and welcomed Black gay men, which was uncommon at other gay bars. Some patrons lived at the site to escape domestic violence and persecution. In 1975, the Locker Room moved to 315 First Ave N in Loring Park, where it would be targeted in raids by the Minneapolis Police Department and shut down by the city government in 1988. The Locker Room and its competitor, Big Daddy's bathhouse, were raided by the Minneapolis Police Department multiple times in the 1970s and 1980s. 116 and 102 Locker Room men were ticketed for disorderly house, in the 1979 and 1980 raids, respectively. In the 1979 raid, nine men were also arrested for sodomy charges. During the HIV/AIDS crisis in 1988, Minneapolis banned the operation of establishments that engaged in "high-risk sexual conduct", including Warehouse district bathhouses.

In the 1980s, the Warehouse district was the epicenter of the Minneapolis art scene until the area's buildings became more commercially desirable in the 1990s. At its peak, the Wyman Building, 400 First Avenue North, was home to more than twenty contemporary art galleries. No Name Gallery was formerly located in the eastern part of the neighborhood, before it moved out of the district and became the Soap Factory.

=== 21st century ===
While some industrial tenants remain (particularly in the area southwest of 4th Street), many of the old factories and warehouses have been converted to commercial space or loft condominiums and apartments. The area still retains some feel of its industrial past, as many newer buildings have attempted to replicate the style of the old warehouses. The Hennepin Energy Recovery Center opened in 1989 as a waste-to-energy plant and Metro Transit has two bus garages nearby including the North Loop Bus Garage which opened in 2023.

Since the mid-1990s, when the gentrification of the neighborhood accelerated, thousands of people have moved into the North Loop. The neighborhood is particularly popular with people who work in downtown Minneapolis, whose proximity allows residents to walk, bike, or take a short bus or METRO ride to work. Coffee shops, restaurants, bars, art galleries, and small retail stores have also moved into the neighborhood in recent years.

The Tony Award-winning Theatre de la Jeune Lune (Closed and building sold) and the Traffic Zone Center for Visual Art, a prominent artist cooperative and gallery space, are located in the eastern part of the neighborhood. The largest employer is the Federal Reserve Bank of Minneapolis, which is located at the southwest end of the Hennepin Avenue Bridge.

In 2005, the North Loop Neighborhood Association launched a re-branding project led by committee members Lisa Goldson Armstrong and Marybeth George. With the design talents from agency Little & Co, they launched a new logo and style guide for the North Loop which supported the neighborhood transformation.

In September 2006, the North Loop Neighborhood Association received funding to build a dog park for North Loop residents. A temporary dog park has been built on N 3rd St and N 7th Ave.

Target Field, home of the Minnesota Twins, opened in 2010, is on the southwest edge of the neighborhood. Plans call for the construction of condominiums and apartments for several thousand new residents near the stadium. The area is also served by Target Field Station, the terminus of the Metro Transit Blue and Green light rail lines and the former Northstar commuter rail route.

== Demographics ==
Race/ethnicity
Race/ethnicity	2000		2010		2020	
Race/ethnicity	Number	%	Number	%	Number	%
White alone	885	58.42	3,064	71.41	5,768	76.50
Black alone	373	24.62	600	13.98	656	8.70
Hispanic or Latino (any race)	96	6.34	232	5.41	326	4.32
Native American alone	68	4.49	59	1.37	82	1.09
Asian alone	40	2.64	221	5.15	374	4.96
Other race alone	2	0.13	3	0.07	41	0.54
Pacific Islander alone	1	0.07	0	0.00	3	0.04
Two or more races	50	3.30	112	2.61	290	3.85
Total	1,515	100.0	4,291	100.0	7,540	100.0

== Notable residents ==
- Dane Rauschenberg, author; long-distance runner

== See also ==
- Interstate 335
- Neighborhoods of Minneapolis
- West Loop, Chicago
